= 2023 World Rowing Championships – Women's quadruple sculls =

Women's quadruple sculls at the 2023 World Rowing Championships
- Venue: Lake Sava
- Location: Belgrade, Serbia
- Dates: 4 September – 9 September
- Competitors: 52 from 13 nations
- Winning time: 6:29.70

Medalists
gold medal	Lauren Henry; Hannah Scott; Lola Anderson; Georgina Brayshaw	Great Britain
silver medal	Roos de Jong; Tessa Dullemans; Laila Youssifou; Bente Paulis	Netherlands
bronze medal	Chen Yunxia; Zhang Ling; Lü Yang; Cui Xiaotong	China

The women's quadruple sculls competition at the 2023 World Rowing Championships took place at Lake Sava, in Belgrade.

== Schedule ==
The schedule was as follows:

Date	Time	Round
Monday 4 September 2023	11:24	Heats
Tuesday 5 September 2023	12:29	Repechages
Thursday 7 September 2023	11:35	Semifinals A/B
Saturday 9 September 2023	12:10	Final B
Saturday 9 September 2023	15:10	Final A

All times are Central European Summer Time (UTC+2)

== Results ==
=== Heats ===
The fastest three boats in each heat advanced directly to the AB semifinals. The remaining boats were sent to the repechages.

==== Heat 1 ====
Rank	Rower	Country	Time	Notes
1	Chen Yunxia; Zhang Ling; Lü Yang; Cui Xiaotong	China	6:30.75	SA/B
2	Fabienne Schweizer; Lisa Lötscher; Pascale Walker; Celia Dupre	Switzerland	6:32.39	SA/B
3	Rowena Meredith; Caitlin Cronin; Harriet Hudson; Kathryn Rowan	Australia	6:33.89	SA/B
4	Lauren O'Connor; Molly Reckford; Grace Joyce; Emily Kallfelz	United States	6:39.34	R
5	Markéta Nedělová; Alžběta Zavadilová; Eliška Podrazilová; Simona Pašková	Czech Republic	7:05.61	R

==== Heat 2 ====
Rank	Rower	Country	Time	Notes
1	Roos de Jong; Tessa Dullemans; Laila Youssifou; Bente Paulis	Netherlands	6:42.00	SA/B
2	Sarah Wibberenz; Frauke Hundeling; Pia Greiten; Tabea Schendekehl	Germany	6:43.51	SA/B
3	Shannon Kennedy; Grace Vandenbroek; Elisa Bolinger; Carling Zeeman	Canada	6:45.68	SA/B
4	Valentina Iseppi; Alessandra Montesano; Laura Meriano; Stefania Gobbi	Italy	6:51.79	R

==== Heat 3 ====
Rank	Rower	Country	Time	Notes
1	Lauren Henry; Hannah Scott; Lola Anderson; Georgina Brayshaw	Great Britain	6:33.47	SA/B
2	Ioana-Madalina Morosan; Andrada-Maria Moroşanu; Cristina Druga; Patricia Cires	Romania	6:38.91	SA/B
3	Daryna Verkhogliad; Nataliya Dovhodko; Anastasiya Kozhenkova; Kateryna Dudchenko	Ukraine	6:43.71	SA/B
4	Audrey Feutrie; Hélène Lefebvre; Violaine Aernoudts; Jeanne Roche	France	6:50.47	R

=== Repechages ===
The three fastest boats advanced to the AB semifinals.

Rank	Rower	Country	Time	Notes
1	Valentina Iseppi; Alessandra Montesano; Laura Meriano; Stefania Gobbi	Italy	6:25.91	SA/B
2	Lauren O'Connor; Molly Reckford; Grace Joyce; Emily Kallfelz	United States	6:27.10	SA/B
3	Audrey Feutrie; Hélène Lefebvre; Violaine Aernoudts; Jeanne Roche	France	6:32.41	SA/B
4	Markéta Nedělová; Alžběta Zavadilová; Eliška Podrazilová; Simona Pašková	Czech Republic	6:40.38	

=== Semifinals A/B ===
The fastest three boats in each Semifinal advanced to the A final. The remaining boats were sent to the B final.

==== Semifinal 1 ====
Rank	Rower	Country	Time	Notes
1	Roos de Jong; Tessa Dullemans; Laila Youssifou; Bente Paulis	Netherlands	7:04.10	FA
2	Chen Yunxia; Zhang Ling; Lü Yang; Cui Xiaotong	China	7:05.19	FA
3	Emanuela-Ioana Ciotău; Andrada-Maria Moroşanu; Cristina Druga; Patricia Cires	Romania	7:12.49	FA
4	Shannon Kennedy; Grace Vandenbroek; Elisa Bolinger; Carling Zeeman	Canada	7:17.46	FB
5	Audrey Feutrie; Hélène Lefebvre; Violaine Aernoudts; Jeanne Roche	France	7:24.69	FB
6	Valentina Iseppi; Alessandra Montesano; Laura Meriano; Stefania Gobbi	Italy	7:27.46	FB

==== Semifinal 2 ====
Rank	Rower	Country	Time	Notes
1	Lauren Henry; Hannah Scott; Lola Anderson; Georgina Brayshaw	Great Britain	7:01.33	FA
2	Fabienne Schweizer; Lisa Lötscher; Pascale Walker; Celia Dupre	Switzerland	7:07.48	FA
3	Rowena Meredith; Caitlin Cronin; Harriet Hudson; Kathryn Rowan	Australia	7:10.34	FA
4	Daryna Verkhogliad; Nataliya Dovhodko; Anastasiya Kozhenkova; Kateryna Dudchenko	Ukraine	7:13.65	FB
5	Sarah Wibberenz; Frauke Hundeling; Pia Greiten; Tabea Schendekehl	Germany	7:14.14	FB
6	Lauren O'Connor; Molly Reckford; Grace Joyce; Emily Kallfelz	United States	7:33.03	FB

=== Finals ===
The A final determined the rankings for places 1 to 6. Additional rankings were determined in the other finals.

==== Final B ====
Rank	Rower	Country	Time	Total rank
1	Sarah Wibberenz; Lisa Gutfleisch; Frauke Hundeling; Tabea Schendekehl	Germany	6:27.26	7
2	Daryna Verkhogliad; Nataliya Dovhodko; Anastasiya Kozhenkova; Kateryna Dudchenko	Ukraine	6:29.88	8
3	Valentina Iseppi; Alessandra Montesano; Laura Meriano; Stefania Gobbi	Italy	6:31.44	9
4	Shannon Kennedy; Grace Vandenbroek; Elisa Bolinger; Carling Zeeman	Canada	6:31.90	10
5	Lauren O'Connor; Molly Reckford; Grace Joyce; Emily Kallfelz	United States	6:33.41	11
6	Audrey Feutrie; Hélène Lefebvre; Violaine Aernoudts; Jeanne Roche	France	6:36.74	12

==== Final A ====
Rank	Rower	Country	Time
1st place, gold medalist(s)	Lauren Henry; Hannah Scott; Lola Anderson; Georgina Brayshaw	Great Britain	6:29.70
2nd place, silver medalist(s)	Roos de Jong; Tessa Dullemans; Laila Youssifou; Bente Paulis	Netherlands	6:30.37
3rd place, bronze medalist(s)	Chen Yunxia; Zhang Ling; Lü Yang; Cui Xiaotong	China	6:35.05
4	Fabienne Schweizer; Lisa Lötscher; Pascale Walker; Celia Dupre	Switzerland	6:38.49
5	Rowena Meredith; Caitlin Cronin; Harriet Hudson; Kathryn Rowan	Australia	6:40.06
6	Emanuela-Ioana Ciotău; Andrada-Maria Moroşanu; Cristina Druga; Patricia Cires	Romania	6:42.69
