= 2022 World Rowing Championships – Women's quadruple sculls =

Women's quadruple sculls at the 2022 World Rowing Championships
- Venue: Labe aréna
- Location: Račice, Czech Republic
- Dates: 19 September – 24 September
- Competitors: 56 from 14 nations
- Winning time: 6:17.49

Medalists
gold medal	Chen Yunxia; Zhang Ling; Lü Yang; Cui Xiaotong	China
silver medal	Nika Johanna Vos; Tessa Dullemans; Ilse Kolkman; Bente Paulis	Netherlands
bronze medal	Jessica Leyden; Lola Anderson; Georgina Brayshaw; Lucy Glover	Great Britain

The women's quadruple sculls competition at the 2022 World Rowing Championships took place at the Račice regatta venue.

== Schedule ==
The schedule was as follows:

Date	Time	Round
Monday 19 September 2022	12:23	Heats
Tuesday 20 September 2022	11:58	Repechages
Thursday 22 September 2022	12:25	Semifinals A/B
Saturday 24 September 2022	11:04	Final C
Saturday 24 September 2022	12:36	Final B
Saturday 24 September 2022	15:10	Final A

All times are Central European Summer Time (UTC+2)

== Results ==
=== Heats ===
The three fastest boats in each heat advanced directly to the AB semifinals. The remaining boats were sent to the repechages.

==== Heat 1 ====
Rank	Rower	Country	Time	Notes
1	Daryna Verkhogliad; Nataliya Dovhodko; Kateryna Dudchenko; Yevheniya Dovhodko	Ukraine	6:21.85	SA/B
2	Nika Johanna Vos; Tessa Dullemans; Ilse Kolkman; Bente Paulis	Netherlands	6:23.63	SA/B
3	Silvia Terrazzi; Alessandra Montesano; Valentina Iseppi; Clara Guerra	Italy	6:25.86	SA/B
4	Elena Logofătu; Cristina Druga; Ioana-Madalina Morosan; Patricia Cires	Romania	6:28.21	R
5	Katarzyna Boruch; Joanna Dittmann; Marta Wieliczko; Katarzyna Zillmann	Poland	6:33.07	R

==== Heat 2 ====
Rank	Rower	Country	Time	Notes
1	Chen Yunxia; Zhang Ling; Lü Yang; Cui Xiaotong	China	6:19.19	SA/B
2	Harriet Hudson; Rowena Meredith; Amanda Bateman; Kathryn Rowan	Australia	6:20.30	SA/B
3	Viktorija Senkutė; Ieva Adomavičiūtė; Donata Karalienė; Dovile Rimkutė	Lithuania	6:24.61	SA/B
4	Sophia Krause; Sarah Wibberenz; Tabea Kuhnert; Sophie Leupold	Germany	6:29.76	R
5	Barbora Podrazilová; Anna Šantručková; Alžběta Zavadilová; Eliška Podrazilová	Czech Republic	6:44.54	R

==== Heat 3 ====
Rank	Rower	Country	Time	Notes
1	Jessica Leyden; Lola Anderson; Georgina Brayshaw; Lucy Glover	Great Britain	6:21.51	SA/B
2	Salome Ulrich; Lisa Lötscher; Pascale Walker; Celia Dupre	Switzerland	6:24.84	SA/B
3	Margaret Fellows; Savannah Brija; Emily Delleman; Emily Kallfelz	United States	6:28.11	SA/B
4	Stella Clayton-Greene; Kirstyn Goodger; Hannah Osborne; Kate Haines	New Zealand	6:33.17	R

=== Repechage ===
The three fastest boats advanced to the semifinals A/B. The remaining boats were sent to the Final C.

Rank	Rower	Country	Time	Notes
1	Stella Clayton-Greene; Kirstyn Goodger; Hannah Osborne; Kate Haines	New Zealand	6:27.88	SA/B
2	Sophia Krause; Sarah Wibberenz; Tabea Kuhnert; Sophie Leupold	Germany	6:28.28	SA/B
3	Katarzyna Boruch; Joanna Dittmann; Marta Wieliczko; Katarzyna Zillmann	Poland	6:29.60	SA/B
4	Elena Logofătu; Cristina Druga; Ioana-Madalina Morosan; Patricia Cires	Romania	6:30.56	FC
5	Barbora Podrazilová; Anna Šantručková; Alžběta Zavadilová; Eliška Podrazilová	Czech Republic	6:37.13	FC

=== Semifinals A/B ===
The three fastest boats in each semi advanced to the A final. The remaining boats were sent to the B final.

==== Semifinal 1 ====
Rank	Rower	Country	Time	Notes
1	Chen Yunxia; Zhang Ling; Lü Yang; Cui Xiaotong	China	6:28.87	FA
2	Daryna Verkhogliad; Nataliya Dovhodko; Kateryna Dudchenko; Yevheniya Dovhodko	Ukraine	6:31.52	FA
3	Salome Ulrich; Lisa Lötscher; Pascale Walker; Celia Dupre	Switzerland	6:31.97	FA
4	Viktorija Senkutė; Ieva Adomavičiūtė; Donata Karalienė; Dovile Rimkutė	Lithuania	6:37.64	FB
5	Katarzyna Boruch; Joanna Dittmann; Marta Wieliczko; Katarzyna Zillmann	Poland	6:41.88	FB
6	Stella Clayton-Greene; Kirstyn Goodger; Hannah Osborne; Kate Haines	New Zealand	6:49.13	FB

==== Semifinal 2 ====
Rank	Rower	Country	Time	Notes
1	Jessica Leyden; Lola Anderson; Georgina Brayshaw; Lucy Glover	Great Britain	6:29.60	FA
2	Harriet Hudson; Rowena Meredith; Amanda Bateman; Kathryn Rowan	Australia	6:32.11	FA
3	Nika Johanna Vos; Tessa Dullemans; Ilse Kolkman; Bente Paulis	Netherlands	6:32.55	FA
4	Margaret Fellows; Savannah Brija; Emily Delleman; Emily Kallfelz	United States	6:38.80	FB
5	Silvia Terrazzi; Alessandra Montesano; Valentina Iseppi; Clara Guerra	Italy	6:40.14	FB
6	Sophia Krause; Sarah Wibberenz; Tabea Kuhnert; Sophie Leupold	Germany	6:43.70	FB

=== Finals ===
The A final determined the rankings for places 1 to 6. Additional rankings were determined in the other finals

==== Final C ====
Rank	Rower	Country	Time	Total rank
1	Elena Logofătu; Cristina Druga; Ioana-Madalina Morosan; Patricia Cires	Romania	6:34.17	13
2	Barbora Podrazilová; Anna Šantručková; Alžběta Zavadilová; Eliška Podrazilová	Czech Republic	6:39.97	14

==== Final B ====
Rank	Rower	Country	Time	Total rank
1	Viktorija Senkutė; Ieva Adomavičiūtė; Donata Karalienė; Dovile Rimkutė	Lithuania	6:31.40	7
2	Silvia Terrazzi; Alessandra Montesano; Valentina Iseppi; Clara Guerra	Italy	6:33.34	8
3	Margaret Fellows; Savannah Brija; Emily Delleman; Emily Kallfelz	United States	6:34.25	9
4	Stella Clayton-Greene; Kirstyn Goodger; Hannah Osborne; Kate Haines	New Zealand	6:39.49	10
5	Katarzyna Boruch; Joanna Dittmann; Marta Wieliczko; Katarzyna Zillmann	Poland	6:40.16	11
6	Sophia Krause; Sarah Wibberenz; Tabea Kuhnert; Sophie Leupold	Germany	6:44.95	12

==== Final A ====
Rank	Rower	Country	Time	Notes
1st place, gold medalist(s)	Chen Yunxia; Zhang Ling; Lü Yang; Cui Xiaotong	China	6:17.49	
2nd place, silver medalist(s)	Nika Johanna Vos; Tessa Dullemans; Ilse Kolkman; Bente Paulis	Netherlands	6:18.68	
3rd place, bronze medalist(s)	Jessica Leyden; Lola Anderson; Georgina Brayshaw; Lucy Glover	Great Britain	6:21.05	
4	Daryna Verkhogliad; Nataliya Dovhodko; Kateryna Dudchenko; Yevheniya Dovhodko	Ukraine	6:24.05	
5	Salome Ulrich; Lisa Lötscher; Pascale Walker; Celia Dupre	Switzerland	6:26.01	
6	Harriet Hudson; Rowena Meredith; Amanda Bateman; Kathryn Rowan	Australia	6:26.02	
