= Rowing at the 2024 Summer Olympics – Women's quadruple sculls =

Women's quadruple sculls at the Games of the XXXIII Olympiad
- Venue: Stade nautique de Vaires-sur-Marne, National Olympic Nautical Stadium of Île-de-France, Vaires-sur-Marne
- Dates: 27–31 July 2024
- Competitors: 9 from 9 nations
- Winning time: 6:16.31

Medalists
1st place, gold medalist(s)		Lauren Henry; Hannah Scott; Lola Anderson; Georgina Brayshaw	Great Britain
2nd place, silver medalist(s)		Laila Youssifou; Bente Paulis; Roos de Jong; Tessa Dullemans	Netherlands
3rd place, bronze medalist(s)		Maren Völz; Tabea Schendekehl; Leonie Menzel; Pia Greiten	Germany

The women's quadruple sculls event at the 2024 Summer Olympics took place from 27 to 31 July 2024 at the Stade nautique de Vaires-sur-Marne, National Olympic Nautical Stadium of Île-de-France, Vaires-sur-Marne.

== Background ==
This was the 13th appearance of the event, which was first held at the 1976 Olympics.

== Qualification ==
Each National Olympic Committee (NOC) was limited to a single boat (one rower) in the event since 1912.

== Competition format ==
This rowing event is a quadruple scull event, meaning that each boat is propelled by four rowers. The "scull" portion means that the rower uses two oars, one on each side of the boat; this contrasts with sweep rowing in which each rower has one oar and rows on only one side. The competition consists of two rounds. Finals are held to determine the placing of each boat. The course used the 2000 metres distance that became the Olympic standard in 1912.

During the first round two heats were held. The first two boats in each heat advanced to final A, while all others were relegated to the repechages.

The repechage offered rowers a second chance to qualify for Final A. The top two boats in the repechage moved on to Final A, with the remaining boats sent to Final B.

There are two finals. Final A determined the medalists and the places through 6th. Final B determined places seven through nine.

== Schedule ==
The competition was held over six days.

All times are Central European Summer Time (UTC+2)

Date	Time	Round
Saturday, 27 July 2024	12:50	Heats
Monday, 29 July 2024	11:30	Repechage
Wednesday, 31 July 2024	12:14	Final B
Wednesday, 31 July 2024	12:38	Final A

== Results ==
=== Heats ===
The first two of each heat qualified for the final, while the remainder went to the repechage.

==== Heat 1 ====
Rank	Lane	Rower	Nation	Time	Notes
1	1	Laila Youssifou; Bente Paulis; Roos de Jong; Tessa Dullemans	Netherlands	6:17.12	Q
2	5	Yevheniya Dovhodko; Kateryna Dudchenko; Daryna Verkhohliad; Anastasiya Kozhenkova	Ukraine	6:20.09	Q
3	2	Chen Yunxia; Zhang Ling; Lü Yang; Cui Xiaotong	China	6:22.29	R
4	3	Ioana Madalina Morosan; Emanuela Ioana Ciotau; Alexandra Ungureanu; Patricia Cires	Romania	6:24.74	R
5	4	Ria Thompson; Rowena Meredith; Laura Gourley; Caitlin Cronin	Australia	6:25.88	R

==== Heat 2 ====
Rank	Lane	Rower	Nation	Time	Notes
1	4	Lauren Henry; Hannah Scott; Lola Anderson; Georgina Brayshaw	Great Britain	6:13.35	Q
2	3	Maren Völz; Tabea Schendekehl; Leonie Menzel; Pia Greiten	Germany	6:15.28	Q
3	2	Fabienne Schweizer; Celia Dupre; Pascale Walker; Lisa Lötscher	Switzerland	6:16.91	R
4	1	Grace Joyce; Emily Delleman; Teal Cohen; Lauren O'Connor	United States	6:27.35	R

=== Repechage ===
The first two qualified for the final, while the remainder went to the B final and were out of medal contention.

Rank	Lane	Rower	Nation	Time	Notes
1	3	Fabienne Schweizer; Celia Dupre; Pascale Walker; Lisa Lötscher	Switzerland	6:26.82	FA
2	2	Chen Yunxia; Zhang Ling; Lü Yang; Cui Xiaotong	China	6:28.72	FA
3	5	Ria Thompson; Rowena Meredith; Laura Gourley; Caitlin Cronin	Australia	6:32.65	FB
4	4	Ioana Madalina Morosan; Emanuela Ioana Ciotau; Alexandra Ungureanu; Patricia Cires	Romania	6:33.84	FB
5	1	Grace Joyce; Emily Delleman; Teal Cohen; Lauren O'Connor	United States	6:34.04	FB

=== Finals ===
==== Final B ====
Rank	Lane	Rower	Nation	Time	Notes
7	1	Ioana Madalina Morosan; Emanuela Ioana Ciotau; Alexandra Ungureanu; Patricia Cires	Romania	6:29.64	
8	2	Ria Thompson; Rowena Meredith; Laura Gourley; Caitlin Cronin	Australia	6:30.85	
9	3	Grace Joyce; Emily Delleman; Teal Cohen; Lauren O'Connor	United States	6:31.71	

==== Final A ====
Rank	Lane	Rower	Nation	Time	Notes
1st place, gold medalist(s)	4	Lauren Henry; Hannah Scott; Lola Anderson; Georgina Brayshaw	Great Britain	6:16.31	
2nd place, silver medalist(s)	3	Laila Youssifou; Bente Paulis; Roos de Jong; Tessa Dullemans	Netherlands	6:16.46	
3rd place, bronze medalist(s)	5	Maren Völz; Tabea Schendekehl; Leonie Menzel; Pia Greiten	Germany	6:19.70	
4	6	Fabienne Schweizer; Celia Dupre; Pascale Walker; Lisa Lötscher	Switzerland	6:20.12	
5	2	Yevheniya Dovhodko; Kateryna Dudchenko; Daryna Verkhohliad; Anastasiya Kozhenkova	Ukraine	6:23.05	
6	1	Chen Yunxia; Zhang Ling; Lü Yang; Cui Xiaotong	China	6:27.08	
