= Netherlands at the 2024 Summer Olympics =

Netherlands at the Games of the XXXIII Olympiad in Paris

- Flag of the Netherlands
- IOC code: NED
- NOC: Dutch Olympic Committee*; Dutch Sports Federation
- Website: www.nocnsf.nl (in Dutch)

in Paris, France 26 July 2024 – 11 August 2024
- Competitors: 273 (110 men and 163 women) in 26 sports
- Flag bearers (opening): Worthy de Jong & Lois Abbingh
- Flag bearers (closing): Harrie Lavreysen & Femke Bol
- Officials: Pieter van den Hoogenband (chef de mission)
- Medals Ranked 6th: Gold 15 Silver 7 Bronze 12 Total 34

Summer Olympics appearances (overview)
- 1900; 1904; 1908; 1912; 1920; 1924; 1928; 1932; 1936; 1948; 1952; 1956; 1960; 1964; 1968; 1972; 1976; 1980; 1984; 1988; 1992; 1996; 2000; 2004; 2008; 2012; 2016; 2020; 2024; 2028

Other related appearances
- 1906 Intercalated Games

The Netherlands competed at the 2024 Summer Olympics in Paris from 26 July to 11 August 2024. Dutch athletes have appeared in every edition of the Summer Olympic Games, with the exception of the sparsely attended 1904 Summer Olympics in St. Louis and 1956 Summer Olympics in Melbourne (except the equestrian events in Stockholm), which the Netherlands boycotted because of the Soviet invasion of Hungary.

The Netherlands left Paris with 34 medals (15 gold, 7 silver, and 12 bronze), this was the country's highest number of gold medals in a single Olympics, beating the 2000 Summer Olympics record of 12.

== Medalists ==
Medal	Name	Sport	Event	Date
Gold	Lennart van Lierop; Finn Florijn; Tone Wieten; Koen Metsemakers	Rowing	Men's quadruple sculls	31 July
Gold	Benthe Boonstra; Hermijntje Drenth; Tinka Offereins; Marloes Oldenburg	Rowing	Women's coxless four	1 August
Gold	Ymkje Clevering; Veronique Meester	Rowing	Women's coxless pair	2 August
Gold	Odile van Aanholt; Annette Duetz	Sailing	Women's 49er FX	2 August
Gold	Karolien Florijn	Rowing	Women's single sculls	3 August
Gold	Isaya Klein Ikkink; Lieke Klaver; Eugene Omalla; Cathelijn Peeters; Femke Bol	Athletics	Mixed 4 × 400 metres relay	3 August
Gold	Worthy de Jong; Arvin Slagter; Jan Driessen; Dimeo van der Horst	Basketball	Men's 3x3 tournament	5 August
Gold	Roy van den Berg; Jeffrey Hoogland; Harrie Lavreysen	Cycling	Men's team sprint	6 August
Gold	Marit Bouwmeester	Sailing	ILCA 6	7 August
Gold	Sharon van Rouwendaal	Swimming	10 km open water	8 August
Gold	Men's national field hockey team: Seve van Ass Lars Balk Koen Bijen Pirmin Blaak Justen Blok Thierry Brinkman Jorrit Croon Thijs van Dam Jonas de Geus Tjep Hoedemakers Jip Janssen Floris Middendorp Joep de Mol Tijmen Reyenga Duco Telgenkamp Derck de Vilder Floris Wortelboer	Field hockey	Men's tournament	8 August
Gold	Harrie Lavreysen	Cycling	Men's sprint	9 August
Gold	Women's national field hockey team: Felice Albers Joosje Burg Pien Dicke Luna Fokke Yibbi Jansen Marleen Jochems Sanne Koolen Renée van Laarhoven Frédérique Matla Freeke Moes Laura Nunnink Lisa Post Pien Sanders Marijn Veen Anne Veenendaal Maria Verschoor Xan de Waard	Field hockey	Women's tournament	9 August
Gold	Sifan Hassan	Athletics	Women's marathon	11 August
Gold	Harrie Lavreysen	Cycling	Men's keirin	11 August
Silver	Laila Youssifou; Bente Paulis; Roos de Jong; Tessa Dullemans	Rowing	Women's quadruple sculls	31 July
Silver	Stef Broenink; Melvin Twellaar	Rowing	Men's double sculls	1 August
Silver	Manon Veenstra	Cycling	Women's BMX	2 August
Silver	Ralf Rienks; Olav Molenaar; Sander de Graaf; Ruben Knab; Gert-Jan van Doorn; Jacob van de Kerkhof; Jan van der Bij; Mick Makker; Dieuwke Fetter (cox)	Rowing	Men's eight	3 August
Silver	Marianne Vos	Cycling	Women's individual road race	4 August
Silver	Hetty van de Wouw	Cycling	Women's keirin	8 August
Silver	Lisanne de Witte; Lieke Klaver; Eveline Saalberg; Myrte van der Schoot; Femke Bol; Cathelijn Peeters	Athletics	Women's 4 × 400 metres relay	10 August
Bronze	Caspar Corbeau	Swimming	Men's 200 metre breaststroke	31 July
Bronze	Tes Schouten	Swimming	Women's 200 metre breaststroke	1 August
Bronze	Simon van Dorp	Rowing	Men's single sculls	3 August
Bronze	Luuc van Opzeeland	Sailing	Men's IQFoil	3 August
Bronze	Sifan Hassan	Athletics	Women's 5000 metres	5 August
Bronze	Maikel van der Vleuten	Equestrian	Individual jumping	6 August
Bronze	Annelous Lammerts	Sailing	Women's Formula Kite	8 August
Bronze	Femke Bol	Athletics	Women's 400 metres hurdles	8 August
Bronze	Lisa van Belle; Maike van der Duin	Cycling	Women's madison	9 August
Bronze	Sifan Hassan	Athletics	Women's 10,000 metres	9 August
Bronze	Women's water polo team: Laura Aarts Nina ten Broek Sarah Buis Kitty-Lynn Joustra Maartje Keuning Simone van de Kraats Lola Moolhuijzen Bente Rogge Lieke Rogge Vivian Sevenich Brigitte Sleeking Sabrina van der Sloot Iris Wolves	Water polo	Women's tournament	10 August
Bronze	Bregje de Brouwer; Noortje de Brouwer	Artistic swimming	Women's duet	10 August

Medals by sport
Sport	1st place, gold medalist(s)	2nd place, silver medalist(s)	3rd place, bronze medalist(s)	Total
Athletics	2	1	3	6
Artistic swimming	0	0	1	1
Basketball	1	0	0	1
Cycling	3	3	1	7
Equestrian	0	0	1	1
Field hockey	2	0	0	2
Rowing	4	3	1	8
Sailing	2	0	2	4
Swimming	1	0	2	3
Water polo	0	0	1	1
Total	15	7	12	34

Medals by day
Day	Date	1st place, gold medalist(s)	2nd place, silver medalist(s)	3rd place, bronze medalist(s)	Total
1	July 27	0	0	0	0
2	July 28	0	0	0	0
3	July 29	0	0	0	0
4	July 30	0	0	0	0
5	July 31	1	1	1	3
6	August 1	1	1	1	3
7	August 2	2	1	0	3
8	August 3	2	1	2	5
9	August 4	0	1	0	1
10	August 5	1	0	1	2
11	August 6	1	0	1	2
12	August 7	1	0	0	1
13	August 8	2	1	2	5
14	August 9	2	0	2	4
15	August 10	0	1	2	3
16	August 11	2	0	0	2
Total		15	7	12	34

Medals by gender
Gender	1st place, gold medalist(s)	2nd place, silver medalist(s)	3rd place, bronze medalist(s)	Total
Female	8	5	8	21
Male	6	2	4	12
Mixed	1	0	0	1
Total	15	7	12	34

Multiple medalists
Name	Sport	1st place, gold medalist(s)	2nd place, silver medalist(s)	3rd place, bronze medalist(s)	Total
Harrie Lavreysen	Cycling	3	0	0	3
Femke Bol	Athletics	1	1	1	3
Lieke Klaver	Athletics	1	1	0	2
Cathelijn Peeters	Athletics	1	1	0	2
Sifan Hassan	Athletics	1	0	2	3

== Competitors ==
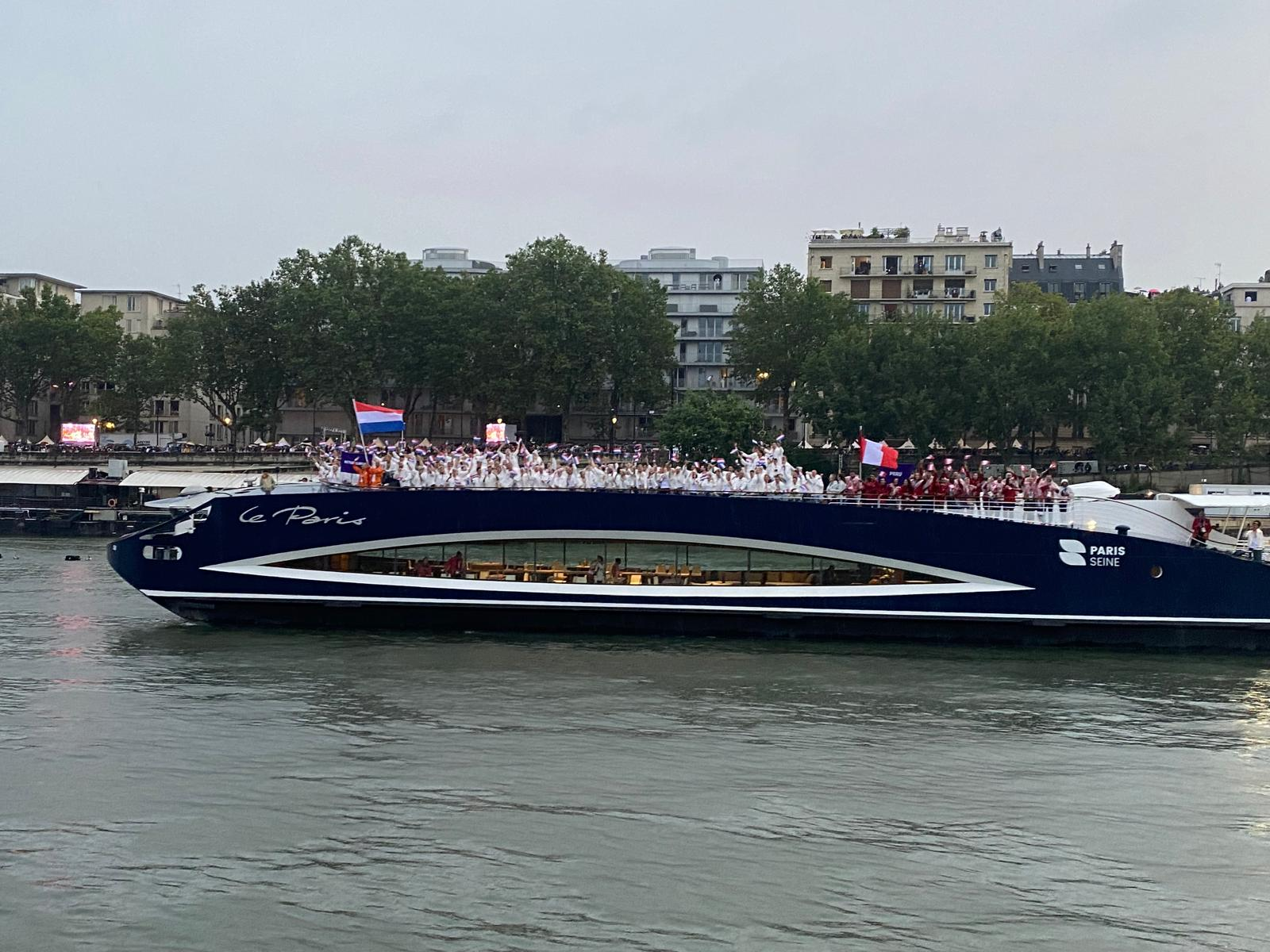
The Dutch delegation on boat the Le Paris during the Parade of Nations.

The following is the list of number of competitors in the Games.

Sport	Men	Women	Total
Archery	1	3	4
Artistic swimming	0	2	2
Athletics	17	23	40
Badminton	1	1	2
Basketball	4	0	4
Boxing	0	1	1
Breaking	2	1	3
Canoeing	1	4	5
Cycling	10	14	24
Diving	0	1	1
Equestrian	4	5	9
Fencing	1	0	1
Field hockey	17	17	34
Golf	0	1	1
Gymnastics	5	5	10
Handball	0	14	14
Judo	5	5	10
Rowing	19	14	33
Sailing	5	6	11
Skateboarding	0	2	2
Swimming	8	12	20
Table tennis	0	1	1
Tennis	4	2	6
Triathlon	2	2	4
Volleyball	4	14	18
Water polo	0	13	13
Total	110	163	273

== Archery ==
The Netherlands qualified four archers to the games through the 2024 European Continental Qualification Tournament and 2024 European Championships in Essen, Germany.

Athlete	Event	Ranking round		Round of 64	Round of 32	Round of 16	Quarterfinals	Semifinals	Final / BM	
Athlete	Event	Score	Seed	Opposition Score	Opposition Score	Opposition Score	Opposition Score	Opposition Score	Opposition Score	Rank
Steve Wijler	Men's individual	668	23	Dror (ISR); W 6–2	Tümer (TUR); L 2–6	Did not advance				
Quinty Roeffen	Women's individual	625	55	Straka (AUT); W 6–4	Kumari (IND); L 2–6	Did not advance				
Gaby Schloesser	Women's individual	649	35	Barbelin (FRA); L 2–6	Did not advance					
Laura van der Winkel	Women's individual	623	59	Choirunisa (INA); L 1–7	Did not advance					
Quinty Roeffen; Gaby Schloesser; Laura van der Winkel	Women's team	1897	12	—N/a		France; W 6–0	India; W 6–0	South Korea; L 4–5	Mexico; L 2–6	4
Steve Wijler; Gaby Schloesser	Mixed team	=1317 SO SO score: L 18–19	17	—N/a		Did not advance				17

== Artistic swimming ==
The Netherlands fielded a pair of artistic swimmers to compete in the women's duet as the top three highest-ranked nations, eligible for qualification at the 2024 World Aquatics Championships in Doha, Qatar.

Athlete	Event	Technical routine		Free routine		Total	Rank
Athlete	Event	Points	Rank	Points	Rank	Total	Rank
Bregje de Brouwer; Noortje de Brouwer	Duet	264.7066	3	293.6897	2	558.3963	3rd place, bronze medalist(s)

== Athletics ==
Dutch track and field athletes achieved the entry standards for Paris 2024, either by passing the direct qualifying mark (or time for track and road races) or by world ranking, in the following events (a maximum of 3 athletes each):

Key

- Note–Ranks given for track events are within the athlete's heat only
- Q = Qualified for the next round
- q = Qualified for the next round as a fastest loser or, in field events, by position without achieving the qualifying target
- qR = Advanced to the next round by referee
- AR = Area (continental) record
- NR = National record
- N/A = Round not applicable for the event
- Bye = Athlete not required to compete in round

Track and road events
Men

Athlete	Event	Heat		Repechage		Semifinal		Final	
Athlete	Event	Result	Rank	Result	Rank	Result	Rank	Result	Rank
Liemarvin Bonevacia	400 m	Withdrew							
Ryan Clarke	800 m	1:45.56	5	1:44.70	5	Did not advance			
Niels Laros	1500 m	3:35.38	4 Q	Bye		3:32.22	4 Q	3:29.54 NR	6
Stefan Nillessen	1500 m	3:36.77	1 Q	Bye		3:32.73 PB	5 Q	3:30.75 PB	9
Mike Foppen	5000 m	14:37.34	19 qR	—N/a				13:21.56	13
Nick Smidt	400 m hurdles	48.64	6 q	Bye		49.61	6	Did not advance	
Khalid Choukoud	Marathon	—N/a						2:25:25	58
Abdi Nageeye	Marathon	—N/a						DNF	
Onyema Adigida; Elvis Afrifa; Taymir Burnet; Nsikak Ekpo	Men's 4 × 100 m relay	38.48	8	—N/a				Did not advance	

Women

Athlete	Event	Heat		Repechage		Semifinal		Final	
Athlete	Event	Result	Rank	Result	Rank	Result	Rank	Result	Rank
Tasa Jiya	200 m	22.74	2 Q	Bye		22.81	6	Did not advance	
Lieke Klaver	400 m	49.96	2 Q	Bye		50.44	4	Did not advance	
Sifan Hassan	5000 m	14:57.65	2 Q	—N/a				14:30.61	3rd place, bronze medalist(s)
Sifan Hassan	10,000 m	—N/a						30:44.12	3rd place, bronze medalist(s)
Sifan Hassan	Marathon	—N/a						2:22:55 OR	1st place, gold medalist(s)
Maureen Koster	5000 m	15:03.66	10	—N/a				Did not advance	
Diane van Es	10,000 m	—N/a						31:25.51	16
Maayke Tjin-A-Lim	100 m hurdles	12.98	7	12.87	2 Q	13.03	7	Did not advance	
Nadine Visser	100 m hurdles	12.53	=1 Q	Bye		12.43	2 Q	12.43	4
Femke Bol	400 m hurdles	53.38	1 Q	Bye		52.57	1 Q	52.15	3rd place, bronze medalist(s)
Cathelijn Peeters	400 m hurdles	54.84	4 q	Bye		55.20	7	Did not advance	
Anne Luijten	Marathon	—N/a						2:33:42	50
Minke Bisschops; Tasa Jiya; Isabel van den Berg; Marije van Hunenstijn	4 × 100 metres relay	42.64	5 q	—N/a				42.74	7
Lisanne de Witte; Lieke Klaver; Eveline Saalberg; Myrte van der Schoot; Femke Bol; Cathelijn Peeters	4 × 400 metres relay	3:25.03	2 Q	—N/a				3:19.50 NR	2nd place, silver medalist(s)

Mixed

Athlete	Event	Heat		Final	
Athlete	Event	Result	Rank	Result	Rank
Isaya Klein Ikkink; Lieke Klaver; Eugene Omalla; Cathelijn Peeters; Femke Bol	4 × 400 metres relay	3:10.81	2 Q	3:07.43 AR	1st place, gold medalist(s)

Field events
Men

Athlete	Event	Qualification		Final	
Athlete	Event	Result	Rank	Result	Rank
Denzel Comenentia	Hammer throw	74.31	9	Did not advance	
Menno Vloon	Pole vault	5.75	6 Q	5.70	11

Women

Athlete	Event	Qualification		Final	
Athlete	Event	Result	Rank	Result	Rank
Pauline Hondema	Long jump	6.55	14	Did not advance	
Alida van Daalen	Shot put	16.53	26	Did not advance	
Jorinde van Klinken	Shot put	16.35	28	Did not advance	
Jessica Schilder	Shot put	18.92	4 q	18.91	6
Alida van Daalen	Discus throw	62.19	16	Did not advance	
Jorinde van Klinken	Discus throw	64.81	5 Q	63.35	7

Combined events – Men's decathlon

Athlete	Event	100 m	LJ	SP	HJ	400 m	110H	DT	PV	JT	1500 m	Total	Rank
Sven Roosen	Result	10.52	7.56 PB	15.10 PB	1.87	46.40 PB	13.99	46.88 PB	4.70	63.72	4:18.55	8607 NR	4
Sven Roosen	Points	970	950	796	687	988	976	806	819	794	821	8607 NR	4
Rik Taam	Result	10.64	7.27	14.27	1.93	47.73	14.78	39.31	4.70	57.08	4:24.82	8046	16
Rik Taam	Points	942	878	745	740	922	876	651	819	694	779	8046	16

Combined events – Women's heptathlon

Athlete	Event	100H	HJ	SP	200 m	LJ	JT	800 m	Total	Rank
Anouk Vetter	Result	13.49	1.74	15.07	24.36	6.12	DNS	–	DNF	
Anouk Vetter	Points	1052	903	866	946	887	0	–	DNF	
Emma Oosterwegel	Result	13.41	1.74	14.54 PB	24.35	5.68	52.39	2:08.67 PB	6386	=7
Emma Oosterwegel	Points	1063	903	830	947	753	906	984	6386	=7
Sofie Dokter	Result	13.57	1.86	13.97 PB	23.73	6.26	42.46	2:13.52	6452 PB	6
Sofie Dokter	Points	1040	1054	792	1007	930	715	914	6452 PB	6

== Badminton ==
Netherlands entered two badminton players into the Olympic tournament based on the BWF Race to Paris Rankings.

Athlete	Event	Group stage				Quarter-final	Semi-final	Final / BM	
Athlete	Event	Opposition Score	Opposition Score	Opposition Score	Rank	Opposition Score	Opposition Score	Opposition Score	Rank
Robin Tabeling; Selena Piek	Mixed doubles	Puavaranukroh / Taerattanachai (THA); L 14–21, 16–21	Seo S-j / Chae Y-j (KOR); L 16–21, 12–21	Mammeri / Mammeri (ALG); W 21–18, 21–9	3	Did not advance			

== Basketball ==
=== 3×3 basketball ===
Summary

Team	Event	Group stage								Play-in	Semifinal	Final / BM	
Team	Event	Opposition Score	Opposition Score	Opposition Score	Opposition Score	Opposition Score	Opposition Score	Opposition Score	Rank	Opposition Score	Opposition Score	Opposition Score	Rank
Netherlands men's	Men's tournament	China; W 21–16	Latvia; L 12–21	Serbia; L 19–21	France; W 20–13	Poland; W 21–17	Lithuania; W 19–18	United States; W 21–6	2 Q	Bye	Lithuania; W 20–9	France; W 18–17^{OT}	1st place, gold medalist(s)

==== Men's tournament ====
The Netherlands men's 3x3 team qualified by winning the FIBA Universality-driven Olympic Qualifying Tournament 2 in Japan.

Team roster

The roster was announced on 3 July 2024.

- Worthy de Jong
- Arvin Slagter
- Jan Driessen
- Dimeo van der Horst

Group play

Pos	Team	Pld	W	L	PF	PA	PD	Qualification
1	Latvia	7	7	0	147	103	+44	Semifinals
2	Netherlands	7	5	2	133	112	+21	Semifinals
3	Lithuania	7	4 (Note: Lithuania 20–18 Serbia)	3	134	125	+9	Play-ins
4	Serbia	7	4	3	129	123	+6	Play-ins
5	France (H)	7	3	4	131	132	−1	Play-ins
6	Poland	7	2 (Note: United States 17–19 Poland)	5	116	139	−23	Play-ins
7	United States	7	2	5	116	138	−22	
8	China	7	1	6	107	141	−34	

Source: FIBA
Rules for classification: 1) Wins; 2) Head-to-head record; 3) Points scored.
(H) Hosts
Notes:

30 July 2024
19:05
v

Boxscore

China	16–21	Netherlands
Pts: Zhang 7		Pts: De Jong 9

Place de la Concorde, Paris
Referees: Markos Michaelides (SUI), Najib Chajiddine (FRA)

31 July 2024
18:35
v

Boxscore

Latvia	21–12	Netherlands
Pts: Lasmanis 8		Pts: De Jong 7

Place de la Concorde, Paris
Referees: Brigitta Csabai-Kaskötő (HUN), Deanna Jackson (USA)

1 August 2024
10:05
v

Boxscore

Netherlands	19–21	Serbia
Pts: Van der Horst, De Jong 8		Pts: Branković 9

Place de la Concorde, Paris
Referees: Markos Michaelides (SUI), Brigitta Csabai-Kaskötő (HUN)

1 August 2024
14:05
v

Boxscore

Netherlands	20–13	France
Pts: van der Horst 8		Pts: Dussoulier 6

Place de la Concorde, Paris
Referees: Jasmina Juras (SRB), Brigitta Csabai-Kaskötő (HUN)

2 August 2024
10:35
v

Boxscore

Poland	17–21	Netherlands
Pts: Zamojski 8		Pts: three players 6

Place de la Concorde, Paris
Referees: Deanna Jackson (USA), Jasmina Juras (SRB)

2 August 2024
13:25
v

Boxscore

Netherlands	19–18	Lithuania
Pts: De Jong 6		Pts: Pukelis 7

Place de la Concorde, Paris
Referees: Deanna Jackson (USA), Jasmina Juras (SRB)

4 August 2024
19:05
v

Boxscore

United States	6–21	Netherlands
Pts: three players 2		Pts: De Jong 11

Place de la Concorde, Paris
Referees: Edmond Ho (HKG), Jasmina Juras (SRB)

Semifinal

5 August 2024
18:00
v

Boxscore

Netherlands	20–9	Lithuania
Pts: De Jong 8		Pts: Pukelis 4

Place de la Concorde, Paris
Referees: Markos Michaelides (SUI), Deanna Jackson (USA)

Gold medal game

5 August 2024
22:30
v

Report

France	17–18 (OT)	Netherlands
Pts: Dussoulier, Seguela 5		Pts: De Jong 7

Place de la Concorde, Paris
Referees: Vlad Ghizdareanu (ROU), Jasmina Juras (SRB)

== Boxing ==
The Netherlands entered one boxer into the Olympic tournament. Chelsey Heijnen (women's lightweight) qualified to Paris after advancing to the final round, and obtained one of three eligible spots, in her own division, at the 2024 World Boxing Olympic Qualification Tournament 1 in Busto Arsizio, Italy.

Athlete	Event	Round of 32	Round of 16	Quarterfinals	Semifinals	Final	
Athlete	Event	Opposition Result	Opposition Result	Opposition Result	Opposition Result	Opposition Result	Rank
Chelsey Heijnen	Women's 60 kg	Bye	Won (PRK); W 4–1	Ferreira (BRA); L 0–5	Did not advance		

== Breaking ==
The Netherlands entered three breakdancers to compete in the B-Boy and B-Girl dual battles for Paris 2024. India Sardjoe (India) outlasted the female breakdancers from Europe through all rounds to successfully win a gold medal and secure an outright berth at the 2023 European Games in Kraków, Poland. Later on, Lee-Lou Demierre (Lee) and Menno van Gorp (Menno) outlasted the male breakdancers from 2024 Olympic Qualifier Series in Shanghai, China and Budapest, Hungary.

Athlete	Nickname	Event	Pre-qualifier	Round robin				Quarterfinal	Semifinal	Final / BM	
Athlete	Nickname	Event	Opposition Result	Opposition Result	Opposition Result	Opposition Result	Rank	Opposition Result	Opposition Result	Opposition Result	Rank
Lee-Lou Demierre	Lee	B-Boys	—N/a	Hongten (KOR); W 2–0	Jeffro (USA); L 0–2	Lagaet (FRA); W 2–0	2 Q	Phil Wizard (CAN); L 0–3	Did not advance		
Menno van Gorp	Menno	B-Boys	—N/a	Amir (KAZ); W 2–0	Quake (TPE); W 2–0	Billy (MAR); W 2–0	1 Q	Shigekix (JPN); L 0–3	Did not advance		
India Sardjoe	India	B-Girls	Talash (EOR); W 3–0	Vanessa (POR); W 2–0	Sunny (USA); W 2–0	671 (CHN); W 2–0	1 Q	Ayumi (JPN); W 2–1	Ami (JPN); L 1–2	671 (CHN); L 1–2	4

== Canoeing ==
=== Slalom ===
Netherlands entered one boat into the slalom competition for the Games through the 2023 ICF Canoe Slalom World Championships in London, Great Britain.

C-1 and K-1

Athlete	Event	Preliminary						Semifinal		Final	
Athlete	Event	Run 1	Rank	Run 2	Rank	Best	Rank	Time	Rank	Time	Rank
Joris Otten	Men's C-1	101.92	8	110.93	17	101.92	17	Did not advance			
Lena Teunissen	Women's C-1	115.51	18	105.33	4	105.33	8 Q	122.82	16	Did not advance	
Martina Wegman	Women's K-1	98.00	10	100.61	19	98.00	16 Q	102.38	13	Did not advance	

Kayak cross

Athlete	Event	Time trial		Round 1	Repechage	Heats	Quarterfinal	Semifinal	Final	
Athlete	Event	Time	Rank	Position	Position	Position	Position	Position	Position	Rank
Joris Otten	Men's KX-1	75.95	29	3 R	3	Did not advance				35
Lena Teunissen	Women's KX-1	74.24	14	2 Q	Bye	3	Did not advance			19
Martina Wegman	Women's KX-1	78.64	29	2 Q	Bye	3	Did not advance			21

=== Sprint ===
The Netherlands canoeists qualified one boat in the following distance for the Games through the 2024 European Qualifiers in Szeged, Hungary.

Athlete	Event	Heats		Quarterfinals		Semifinals		Final	
Athlete	Event	Time	Rank	Time	Rank	Time	Rank	Time	Rank
Selma Konijn	Women's K-1 500 metres	1:49.28	2 SF	Bye		1:52.50	5 FC	1:50.56	17
Ruth Vorsselman	Women's K-1 500 metres	1:56.88	4 QF	1:52.35	2 SF	1:54.91	8	Did not advance	
Selma Konijn; Ruth Vorsselman	Women's K-2 500 metres	1:43.91	4 QF	1:40.93	1 SF	1:39.49	3 FA	1:41.26	8

== Cycling ==
=== Road ===
Netherlands entered seven riders (three men and four women) to compete in the respective events by virtue of the establishment of the UCI World Rankings and the nation's result at the 2023 UCI Road World Championships in Glasgow, Scotland.

Men

Athlete	Event	Time	Rank
Daan Hoole	Road race	6:41:17	72
Dylan van Baarle	Road race	6:23:16	36
Mathieu van der Poel	Road race	6:21:23	12
Daan Hoole	Time trial	38:06.68	17

Women

Athlete	Event	Time	Rank
Ellen van Dijk	Road race	4:08:14	58
Demi Vollering	Road race	4:04:23	34
Marianne Vos	Road race	4:00:21	2nd place, silver medalist(s)
Lorena Wiebes	Road race	4:02:54	11
Ellen van Dijk	Time trial	42:21.76	11
Demi Vollering	Time trial	41:29.80	5

=== Track ===
The Netherlands riders obtained full spots for the men's and women's individual sprint, team sprint, keirin, madison, and omnium events based on their country's results in the final UCI Olympic rankings.

Sprint

Athlete	Event	Qualification		Round 1	Repechage 1	Round 2	Repechage 2	Round 3	Repechage 3	Quarterfinals	Semifinals	Finals / BM	
Athlete	Event	Time Speed (km/h)	Rank	Opposition Time Speed (km/h)	Opposition Time Speed (km/h)	Opposition Time Speed (km/h)	Opposition Time Speed (km/h)	Opposition Time Speed (km/h)	Opposition Time Speed (km/h)	Opposition Result	Opposition Result	Opposition Result	Rank
Harrie Lavreysen	Men's sprint	9.098 WR; 79.225	1 Q	Dörnbach (GER); W 9.953; 72.340	Bye	Helal (FRA); W 9.902; 72.713	Bye	Obara (JPN); W 9.845; 73.134	Bye	Rudyk (POL); W, W	Carlin (GBR); W, W	Richardson (AUS); W, W	1st place, gold medalist(s)
Jeffrey Hoogland	Men's sprint	9.293; 77.478	6 Q	Lendel (LTU); W 9.933; 72.486	Bye	Rudyk (POL); W 9.790; 73.544	Bye	Awang (MAL); W 9.772; 73.680	Bye	Turnbull (GBR); L, W, W	Richardson (AUS); L, L	Carlin (GBR); W, L, L	4
Steffie van der Peet	Women's sprint	10.471; 68.709	14 Q	Clonan (AUS); L	Bao (CHN); Verdugo (MEX); W 11.155; 64.545	Finucane (GBR); L	Mitchell (CAN); L	Did not advance					
Hetty van de Wouw	Women's sprint	10.263; 70.155	8 Q	Gaxiola (MEX); W 10.883; 66.158	Bye	Fulton (NZL); W 10.769; 66.859	Bye	Gros (FRA); W 10.732; 67.089	Bye	Capewell (GBR); W, W	Friedrich (GER); W, L, L	Finucane (GBR); L, L	4

Team sprint

Athlete	Event	Qualification		Semifinals		Final	
Athlete	Event	Time Speed (km/h)	Rank	Opposition Time Speed (km/h)	Rank	Opposition Time Speed (km/h)	Rank
Harrie Lavreysen; Jeffrey Hoogland; Roy van den Berg	Men's team sprint	41.279 OR; 65.409	1 Q	Canada; W 41.191 WR; 65.548	1 FA	Great Britain; W 40.949 WR; 65.936	1st place, gold medalist(s)
Steffie van der Peet; Hetty van de Wouw; Kyra Lamberink	Women's team sprint	46.086; 58.586	4 Q	China; W 45.798; 58.955	1 FB	Germany; L 45.690; 59.471	4

Qualification legend: FA=Gold medal final; FB=Bronze medal final

Keirin

Athlete	Event	Round 1	Repechage	Quarterfinals	Semifinals	Final
Athlete	Event	Rank	Rank	Rank	Rank	Rank
Harrie Lavreysen	Men's keirin	1 Q	Bye	1 Q	2 FA	1st place, gold medalist(s)
Jeffrey Hoogland	Men's keirin	2 Q	Bye	5	Did not advance	
Steffie van der Peet	Women's keirin	3 R	2 Q	4 Q	4 FB	10
Hetty van de Wouw	Women's keirin	1 Q	Bye	1 Q	1 FA	2nd place, silver medalist(s)

Qualification legend: Q=Qualified for next round; R=Advanced to repechage

Omnium

Athlete	Event	Scratch race		Tempo race		Elimination race		Points race		Total	
Athlete	Event	Rank	Points	Rank	Points	Rank	Points	Rank	Points	Points	Rank
Jan-Willem van Schip	Men's omnium	4	34	13	16	21	1	15	0	51	15
Maike van der Duin	Women's omnium	4	34	20	2	7	28	2	40	106	6

Madison

Athlete	Event	Points	Laps	Rank
Yoeri Havik; Jan-Willem van Schip	Men's madison	DSQ		
Lisa van Belle; Maike van der Duin	Women's madison	28	20	3rd place, bronze medalist(s)

=== Mountain biking ===
Netherlands mountain bikers secured two women's quotas through the release of the final Olympic mountain biking rankings.

Athlete	Event	Time	Rank
Puck Pieterse	Women's cross-country	1:29:25	4
Anne Terpstra	Women's cross-country	1:31:35	9

=== BMX ===
Race

Riders from the Netherlands secured five quota places (two men's and three women's) race for Paris 2024 through the allocations of final Olympic BMX ranking.

Athlete	Event	Quarterfinal		Repechage		Semifinal		Final	
Athlete	Event	Points	Rank	Result	Rank	Points	Rank	Result	Rank
Jaymio Brink	Men's	17	17 q	34.253	4 Q	17	10	Did not advance	
Dave van der Burg	Men's	16	15 q	34.818	5	Did not advance			
Laura Smulders	Women's	8	6 Q	Bye		9	4 Q	35.745	4
Merel Smulders	Women's	11	10 Q	Bye		19	12	Did not advance	
Manon Veenstra	Women's	7	5 Q	Bye		9	3 Q	34.954	2nd place, silver medalist(s)

== Diving ==
Dutch divers secured one quota place for Paris 2024 by virtue of the top twelve individuals of the women's individual platform, not yet qualified, at the 2024 World Aquatics Championships in Doha, Qatar.

Athlete	Event	Preliminary		Semifinal		Final	
Athlete	Event	Points	Rank	Points	Rank	Points	Rank
Else Praasterink	Women's 10 m platform	281.60	15 Q	292.80	12 Q	250.35	12

== Equestrian ==
The Netherlands entered a full squad of equestrian riders each to the team dressage and jumping competitions through the 2022 FEI World Championships in Herning, Denmark. The Netherlands entered a full squad of equestrian riders to the eventing competition by finishing 8th at the 2023 European Eventing Championships in Le Pin-au-Haras, France, picking up one of the two qualifying spots on offer for the Paris 2024 Olympic Games.

=== Dressage ===
Athlete	Horse	Event	Grand Prix		Grand Prix Special		Grand Prix Freestyle		Overall	
Athlete	Horse	Event	Score	Rank	Score	Rank	Technical	Artistic	Score	Rank
Dinja van Liere	Hermes	Individual	77.764	2 Q	—N/a		88.432	4	88.432	4
Emmelie Scholtens	Indian Rock	Individual	74.581	1 Q	—N/a		81.750	11	81.750	11
Hans-Peter Minderhoud	Toto Jr.	Individual	72.578	3	—N/a		Did not advance			
Dinja van Liere; Emmelie Scholtens; Hans-Peter Minderhoud	See above	Team	224.923	4 Q	221.048	4	—N/a		221.048	4

Qualification Legend: Q = Qualified for the final based on position in group; q = Qualified for the final based on overall position

=== Eventing ===
Athlete	Horse	Event	Dressage		Cross-country			Jumping						Total	
Athlete	Horse	Event	Dressage		Cross-country			Qualifier			Final			Total	
Athlete	Horse	Event	Penalties	Rank	Penalties	Total	Rank	Penalties	Total	Rank	Penalties	Total	Rank	Penalties	Rank
Janneke Boonzaaijer	Champ de Tailleur	Individual	31.90	29	–	31.90	16	–	31.90	10	–	31.90	9	31.90	9
Raf Kooremans	Radar Love	Individual	27.00	16	5.60	32.60	18	12.8	45.40	26	Did not advance				26
Sanne de Jong	Enjoy	Individual	34.80	40	48.20	83.00	53	5.2	88.20	47	Did not advance				47
Janneke Boonzaaijer; Raf Kooremans; Sanne de Jong	See above	Team	93.70	9	53.80	147.50	10	18.0	165.50	10	—N/a			165.50	10

=== Jumping ===
Athlete	Horse	Event	Qualification			Final			Jump-off		
Athlete	Horse	Event	Penalties	Time	Rank	Penalties	Time	Rank	Penalties	Time	Rank
Harrie Smolders	Uricas van de Kattevennen	Individual	0	74.02	4 Q	6	85.75	14	Did not advance		
Kim Emmen	Imagine	Individual	0	75.33	9 Q	12	83.52	23	Did not advance		
Maikel van der Vleuten	Beauville Z	Individual	4	70.94	22 Q	0	82.06	=1	4	39.12	3rd place, bronze medalist(s)
Harrie Smolders; Kim Emmen; Maikel van der Vleuten	See above	Team	8	233.31	5 Q	7	238.69	4	—N/a		

== Fencing ==
The Netherlands entered one fencer into the Olympic competition. Tristan Tulen qualified for the games by winning the gold medal in the men's individual épée event, at the 2024 Europe Zonal Qualifying Tournament in Differdange, Luxembourg.

Athlete	Event	Round of 64	Round of 32	Round of 16	Quarterfinal	Semifinal	Final / BM	
Athlete	Event	Opposition Score	Opposition Score	Opposition Score	Opposition Score	Opposition Score	Opposition Score	Rank
Tristan Tulen	Men's épée	Bye	Vismara (ITA); L 11–15	Did not advance				

== Field hockey ==
Summary

Key:

- FT – After full-time.
- P – Match decided by penalty-shootout.

Team	Event	Group stage						Quarterfinal	Semifinal	Final / BM	
Team	Event	Opposition Score	Opposition Score	Opposition Score	Opposition Score	Opposition Score	Rank	Opposition Score	Opposition Score	Opposition Score	Rank
Netherlands men's	Men's tournament	South Africa; W 5–3	France; W 4–0	Great Britain; D 2–2	Germany; L 0–1	Spain; W 5–3	2 Q	Australia; W 2–0	Spain; W 4–0	Germany; W 3–1^{P} FT: 1–1	1st place, gold medalist(s)
Netherlands women's	Women's tournament	France; W 6–2	Germany; W 2–1	China; W 3–0	Belgium; W 3–1	Japan; W 5–1	1 Q	Great Britain; W 3–1	Argentina; W 3–0	China; W 3–1^{P} FT: 1–1	1st place, gold medalist(s)

=== Men's tournament ===
Netherlands men's national field hockey team qualified for the Olympics following the triumph of the nation's gold medal results at the 2023 EuroHockey Championship in Mönchengladbach, Germany.

Team roster

Netherlands announced their squad on 19 June 2024.

Head coach: Jeroen Delmee

No.	Pos.	Player	Date of birth (age)	Caps	Club
2	DF	Jip Janssen	14 October 1997 (aged 26)	108	(Netherlands) Kampong
4	DF	Lars Balk	26 February 1996 (aged 28)	134	(Netherlands) Kampong
6	MF	Jonas de Geus	29 April 1998 (aged 26)	139	(Netherlands) Kampong
7	FW	Thijs van Dam	5 January 1997 (aged 27)	107	(Netherlands) Rotterdam
8	FW	Thierry Brinkman (Captain)	19 March 1995 (aged 29)	176	(Netherlands) Bloemendaal
9	MF	Seve van Ass	10 April 1992 (aged 32)	228	(Netherlands) HGC
10	MF	Jorrit Croon	9 August 1998 (aged 25)	144	(Netherlands) Bloemendaal
12	DF	Justen Blok	27 September 2000 (aged 23)	67	(Netherlands) Rotterdam
14	MF	Derck de Vilder	23 November 1998 (aged 25)	63	(Netherlands) Kampong
16	DF	Floris Wortelboer	4 August 1996 (aged 27)	110	(Netherlands) Bloemendaal
19	FW	Tjep Hoedemakers	14 October 1999 (aged 24)	48	(Netherlands) Rotterdam
22	FW	Koen Bijen	27 July 1998 (aged 26)	58	(Netherlands) Den Bosch
23	DF	Joep de Mol	10 December 1995 (aged 28)	149	(Netherlands) Oranje-Rood
26	GK	Pirmin Blaak	8 March 1988 (aged 36)	146	(Netherlands) Oranje-Rood
29	DF	Tijmen Reyenga	10 October 1999 (aged 24)	46	(Netherlands) Oranje-Rood
51	FW	Duco Telgenkamp	17 July 2002 (aged 22)	21	(Netherlands) Kampong
77	FW	Floris Middendorp	4 June 2001 (aged 23)	31	(Netherlands) Amsterdam

Group play

Pos	Team	Pld	W	D	L	GF	GA	GD	Pts	Qualification
1	Germany	5	4	0	1	16	6	+10	12	Advance to quarter-finals
2	Netherlands	5	3	1	1	16	9	+7	10	Advance to quarter-finals
3	Great Britain	5	2	2	1	11	7	+4	8	Advance to quarter-finals
4	Spain	5	2	1	2	11	12	−1	7	Advance to quarter-finals
5	South Africa	5	1	1	3	11	17	−6	4	
6	France (H)	5	0	1	4	8	22	−14	1	

Source: FIH
Rules for classification: 1) points; 2) matches won; 3) goal difference; 4) goals for; 5) head-to-head result; 6) field goals scored.
(H) Hosts

27 July 2024
12:45
v

Netherlands	5–3	South Africa
Janssen 2', 30'; De Geus 10'; Hoedemakers 16'; Telgenkamp 33'	Report	M. Cassiem 7'; Kok 34'; Guise-Brown 44'

Pitch 1
Umpires:
David Tomlinson (NZL)
Lim Hong Zhen (SGP)

28 July 2024
19:45
v

Netherlands	4–0	France
Reyenga 7'; Bijen 28'; De Geus 31'; Telgenkamp 54'	Report

Pitch 1
Umpires:
Sean Rapaport (RSA)
Irene Presenqui (ARG)

30 July 2024
12:45
v

Great Britain	2–2	Netherlands
Morton 56', 58'	Report	Wortelboer 45'; Van Dam 52'

Pitch 1
Umpires:
Gabriel Labate (ARG)
Ben Göntgen (GER)

31 July 2024
17:30
v

Germany	1–0	Netherlands
Wellen 3'	Report

Pitch 2
Umpires:
Martin Madden (GBR)
David Tomlinson (NZL)

2 August 2024
10:30
v

Netherlands	5–3	Spain
Janssen 19', 53'; Hoedemakers 40', 48'; Wortelboer 43'	Report	Basterra 7'; Reyné 15'; Miralles 48'

Pitch 2
Umpires:
Dan Barstow (GBR)
Sean Rapaport (RSA)

Quarterfinal

4 August 2024
17:30
v

Netherlands	2–0	Australia
Telgenkamp 35'; Van Dam 52'	Report

Pitch 1
Umpires:
Dan Barstow (GBR)
Gareth Greenfield (NZL)

Semifinal

6 August 2024
14:00
v

Netherlands	4–0	Spain
Janssen 12'; Brinkman 20' van Dam 32'; Telgenkamp 50'	Report

Pitch 1
Umpires:
Ben Göntgen (GER)
Martin Madden (GBR)

Gold medal match

8 August 2024
19:00
v

(silver) Germany	1–1	Netherlands (gold)
Prinz 50'	Report; Shootout report	Brinkman 46'
Penalties
Wellen (penalty shoot-out missed); H. Müller (penalty shoot-out missed); Prinz (penalty shoot-out missed); Weigand (penalty shoot-out scored)	1–3	(penalty shoot-out missed) De Geus; (penalty shoot-out missed) De Mol; (penalty shoot-out scored) Brinkman; (penalty shoot-out scored) Van Dam; (penalty shoot-out scored) Telgenkamp

Stade Yves-du-Manoir
Attendance: 15,000
Umpires:
Martin Madden (GBR)
Steve Rogers (AUS)

=== Women's tournament ===
Netherlands women's national field hockey team qualified for the Olympics following the triumph of the nation's gold medal results at the 2023 EuroHockey Championship in Mönchengladbach, Germany.

Team roster

The squad was announced on 28 May 2024.

Head Coach: Paul van Ass

No.	Pos.	Player	Date of birth (age)	Caps	Goals	Club
1	GK	Anne Veenendaal	7 September 1995 (aged 28)	118	0	(Netherlands) Amsterdam
2	MF	Luna Fokke	9 March 2001 (aged 23)	35	6	(Netherlands) Kampong
4	FW	Freeke Moes	29 November 1998 (aged 25)	62	21	(Netherlands) Amsterdam
5	DF	Lisa Post	27 January 1999 (aged 25)	44	0	(Netherlands) SCHC
7	MF	Xan de Waard (Captain)	8 November 1995 (aged 28)	209	20	(Netherlands) SCHC
8	MF	Yibbi Jansen	18 November 1999 (aged 24)	73	60	(Netherlands) SCHC
9	DF	Renée van Laarhoven	15 October 1997 (aged 26)	62	3	(Netherlands) SCHC
10	MF	Felice Albers	27 December 1999 (aged 24)	66	26	(Netherlands) Amsterdam
11	MF	Maria Verschoor	22 April 1994 (aged 30)	205	29	(Netherlands) Amsterdam
14	DF	Sanne Koolen	23 March 1996 (aged 28)	111	1	(Netherlands) Den Bosch
15	FW	Frédérique Matla	28 December 1996 (aged 27)	130	94	(Netherlands) Den Bosch
16	FW	Joosje Burg	29 July 1997 (aged 26)	42	22	(Netherlands) Den Bosch
17	DF	Marleen Jochems	24 January 2000 (aged 24)	21	0	(Netherlands) Hurley
18	DF	Pien Sanders	11 June 1998 (aged 26)	123	6	(Netherlands) Den Bosch
19	FW	Marijn Veen	18 November 1996 (aged 27)	48	23	(Netherlands) Amsterdam
20	MF	Laura Nunnink	26 January 1995 (aged 29)	188	2	(Netherlands) Den Bosch

Group play

Pos	Team	Pld	W	D	L	GF	GA	GD	Pts	Qualification
1	Netherlands	5	5	0	0	19	5	+14	15	Quarter-finals
2	Belgium	5	4	0	1	13	4	+9	12	Quarter-finals
3	Germany	5	3	0	2	12	7	+5	9	Quarter-finals
4	China	5	2	0	3	15	10	+5	6	Quarter-finals
5	Japan	5	1	0	4	2	15	−13	3	
6	France (H)	5	0	0	5	4	24	−20	0	

Source: FIH
Rules for classification: 1) points; 2) matches won; 3) goal difference; 4) goals for; 5) head-to-head result; 6) field goals scored.
(H) Hosts

27 July 2024
20:15
v

Netherlands	6–2	France
Matla 29'; Jansen 32', 35', 45', 48'; Burg 50'	Report	Lhopital 35'; Le Nindre 46'

Pitch 2
Umpires:
Ayanna McClean (TTO)
Cookie Tan (SGP)

29 July 2024
19:45
v

Germany	1–2	Netherlands
Stapenhorst 44'	Report	Jansen 50'; Veen 54'

Pitch 1
Umpires:
Amber Church (NZL)
Aleisha Neumann (AUS)

31 July 2024
20:15
v

Netherlands	3–0	China
Moes 3'; Veen 15'; Verschoor 46'	Report

Pitch 2
Umpires:
Laurine Delforge (BEL)
Irene Presenqui (ARG)

2 August 2024
12:45
v

Belgium	1–3	Netherlands
Ballenghien 35'	Report	Sanders 6'; Jansen 13'; Verschoor 30'

Pitch 1
Umpires:
Hannah Harrison (GBR)
Liu Xiaoying (CHN)

3 August 2024
10:30
v

Netherlands	5–1	Japan
Jansen 4'; Matla 9', 40'; Burg 14'; Veen 53'	Report	Kobayakawa 23'

Pitch 2
Umpires:
Rachel Williams (GBR)
Sarah Wilson (GBR)

Quarterfinal

5 August 2024
17:30
v

Netherlands	3–1	Great Britain
De Waard 1'; Fokke 30', 46'	Report	French 20'

Pitch 1
Umpires:
Liu Xiaoying (CHN)
Irene Presenqui (ARG)

Semifinal

7 August 2024
14:00
v

Netherlands	3–0	Argentina
Fokke 21'; Nunnink 26'; Jansen 35'	Report

Pitch 1
Umpires:
Laurine Delforge (BEL)
Sarah Wilson (GBR)

Final

9 August 2024
20:00
v

(gold) Netherlands	1–1	China (silver)
Jansen 51'	Report; Penalty shootout report	Chen Yi 6'
Penalties
Sanders (penalty shoot-out scored); Verschoor (penalty shoot-out scored); Moes (penalty shoot-out missed); Veen (penalty shoot-out scored)	3–1	(penalty shoot-out missed) He; (penalty shoot-out missed) Zou; (penalty shoot-out scored) Zhong; (penalty shoot-out missed) Ma

Stade Yves-du-Manoir
Attendance: 14,000
Umpires:
Sarah Wilson (GBR)
Laurine Delforge (BEL)

== Golf ==
Based on the IGF World Rankings, four golfers from the Netherlands were qualified. However, the Netherlands Olympic Committee (NOC*NSF) has additional requirements that were only met by Anne van Dam, hence the remaining positions were forfeited. Dutch golfer Joost Luiten was one of the athletes that did not meet NOC*NSF requirements and as a result was excluded from competing. Luiten successfully appealed this decision in Dutch court, but did not take the case to the CAS because it was too late to enter the tournament. The other golfers that qualified but were not allowed into the competition by NOC*NSF were Darius van Driel and Dewi Weber.

Athlete	Event	Round 1	Round 2	Round 3	Round 4	Total		
Athlete	Event	Score	Score	Score	Score	Score	Par	Rank
Anne van Dam	Women's	75	74	78	72	299	+11	T44

== Gymnastics ==
=== Artistic ===
The Netherlands fielded a full squad of male and female gymnasts for Paris after advancing to the final round of team all-around and obtained one of nine available team spots for nations not yet qualified at the 2023 World Championships in Antwerp, Belgium.

Men
Team

Athlete	Event	Qualification								Final							
Athlete	Event	Apparatus						Total	Rank	Apparatus						Total	Rank
Athlete	Event	F	PH	R	V	PB	HB	Total	Rank	F	PH	R	V	PB	HB	Total	Rank
Jermain Grünberg	Team	13.533	~~11.800~~	13.000	13.833	~~13.000~~	~~11.766~~	76.932	43	Did not advance							
Loran de Munck	Team	—N/a	14.766 Q	—N/a		14.133	—N/a			Did not advance							
Frank Rijken	Team	13.600	13.400	~~12.933~~	~~13.300~~	14.600	13.400	81.233	23 Q	Did not advance							
Casimir Schmidt	Team	13.700	13.300	13.766	13.900	14.066	13.366	82.098	17 Q	Did not advance							
Martijn de Veer	Team	~~13.333~~	—N/a	13.200	14.266	—N/a	13.466	—N/a		Did not advance							
Total	Team	40.833	41.466	39.966	41.999	42.799	40.232	247.295	10	Did not advance							

Individual finals

Athlete	Event	Final							
Athlete	Event	Apparatus						Total	Rank
Athlete	Event	F	PH	R	V	PB	HB	Total	Rank
Loran de Munck	Pommel horse	—N/a	13.733	—N/a				13.733	8
Frank Rijken	All-around	13.433	12.733	12.733	13.733	14.266	13.400	80.298	22
Casimir Schmidt	All-around	13.666	13.900	13.833	14.400	13.633	13.066	82.498	13

Women
Team

Athlete	Event	Qualification						Final					
Athlete	Event	Apparatus				Total	Rank	Apparatus				Total	Rank
Athlete	Event	V	UB	BB	F	Total	Rank	V	UB	BB	F	Total	Rank
Tisha Volleman	Team	13.133	12.766	12.5	12.566	50.965	42	Did not advance					
Sanna Veerman	Team	13.6	14.4	—N/a	DNS	—N/a		Did not advance					
Naomi Visser	Team	13.233	14.266	13.3	12.233	53.032	21 Q	Did not advance					
Lieke Wevers	Team	13.3	12.566	13.366	12.3	51.532	32 R2	Did not advance					
Sanne Wevers	Team	—N/a		13.766	—N/a			Did not advance					
Total	Team	40.133	41.432	40.432	37.099	159.096	9	Did not advance					

Individual finals

Athlete	Event	Final					
Athlete	Event	Apparatus				Total	Rank
Athlete	Event	V	UB	BB	F	Total	Rank
Naomi Visser	All-around	12.966	14.266	13.333	13.400	53.965	10

== Handball ==
Summary

Key:

- ET: After extra time
- P – Match decided by penalty-shootout.

Team	Event	Group Stage						Quarterfinal	Semifinal	Final / BM	
Team	Event	Opposition Score	Opposition Score	Opposition Score	Opposition Score	Opposition Score	Rank	Opposition Score	Opposition Score	Opposition Score	Rank
Netherlands women's	Women's tournament	Angola; W 34–31	France; L 28–32	Spain; W 29–24	Brazil; W 31–24	Hungary; W 30–26	2 Q	Denmark; L 25–29	Did not advance		5

=== Women's tournament ===
Netherlands women's national handball team qualified for the Olympics by securing a top two spot at the Tournament 2 of the 2024 IHF Women's Olympic Qualification Tournaments in Torrevieja, Spain.

Team roster

The squad was announced on 8 July 2024. On 20 July, Zoë Sprengers was replaced by Judith van der Helm due to an injury.

Head coach: (Sweden) Per Johansson

No.	Pos.	Name	Date of birth (age)	Height	App.	Goals	Club
6	RB	Laura van der Heijden	27 June 1990 (aged 34)	1.73 m	280	850	(France) Chambray Touraine Handball
8	LB	Lois Abbingh	13 August 1992 (aged 31)	1.78 m	205	857	(Norway) Vipers Kristiansand
9	CB	Larissa Nüsser	8 February 2000 (aged 24)	1.75 m	71	124	(Norway) Vipers Kristiansand
12	LW	Bo van Wetering	5 October 1999 (aged 24)	1.71 m	76	292	(Hungary) Győri ETO KC
14	LB	Judith van der Helm	13 January 2005 (aged 19)	1.82 m	3	1	(Netherlands) OTTO Work Force/VOC Amsterdam
16	P	Tamara Haggerty	29 April 1996 (aged 28)	1.78 m	32	22	(Hungary) DVSC Schaeffler
17	LB	Kim Molenaar	28 April 2002 (aged 22)	1.78 m	26	21	(Denmark) København Håndbold
18	LB	Kelly Dulfer	21 March 1994 (aged 30)	1.85 m	185	308	(Hungary) Győri ETO KC
26	RW	Angela Malestein	31 January 1993 (aged 31)	1.73 m	208	629	(Hungary) Ferencvárosi TC
30	GK	Rinka Duijndam	6 August 1997 (aged 26)	1.78 m	85	1	(Romania) CS Rapid București
38	GK	Yara ten Holte	23 November 1999 (aged 24)	1.75 m	50	4	(Denmark) Odense Håndbold
44	P	Nikita van der Vliet	14 March 2000 (aged 24)	1.73 m	48	82	(Denmark) Odense Håndbold
48	RB	Dione Housheer	26 September 1999 (aged 24)	1.80 m	88	257	(Hungary) Győri ETO KC
79	CB	Estavana Polman	5 August 1992 (aged 31)	1.74 m	182	621	(Romania) CS Rapid București

Group play

Pos	Team	Pld	W	D	L	GF	GA	GD	Pts	Qualification
1	France (H)	5	5	0	0	159	124	+35	10	Quarterfinals
2	Netherlands	5	4	0	1	152	137	+15	8	Quarterfinals
3	Hungary	5	2	1	2	137	140	−3	5	Quarterfinals
4	Brazil	5	2	0	3	127	119	+8	4	Quarterfinals
5	Angola	5	1	1	3	131	154	−23	3	
6	Spain	5	0	0	5	111	143	−32	0	

Source: Olympics Paris 2024 rankings
Rules for classification: 1) Points; 2) Head-to-head points; 3) Head-to-head goal difference; 4) Head-to-head goals scored; 5) Goal difference; 6) Goals scored; 7) Draw.
(H) Hosts

25 July 2024; 11:00	Netherlands	34–31	Angola	Paris Expo Porte de Versailles, Paris; Attendance: 5,686; Referees: Kuttler, Merz (GER)
25 July 2024; 11:00	Malestein, Polman 8	(19–18)	Nenganga, H. Paulo 6	Paris Expo Porte de Versailles, Paris; Attendance: 5,686; Referees: Kuttler, Merz (GER)
25 July 2024; 11:00	1× (yellow card) 1× (suspension)	Report	3× (suspension)	Paris Expo Porte de Versailles, Paris; Attendance: 5,686; Referees: Kuttler, Merz (GER)

28 July 2024; 21:00	France	32–28	Netherlands	Paris Expo Porte de Versailles, Paris; Attendance: 5,748; Referees: Lah, Sok (SLO)
28 July 2024; 21:00	Valentini 10	(17–14)	Malestein 7	Paris Expo Porte de Versailles, Paris; Attendance: 5,748; Referees: Lah, Sok (SLO)
28 July 2024; 21:00	2× (suspension)	Report	2× (suspension)	Paris Expo Porte de Versailles, Paris; Attendance: 5,748; Referees: Lah, Sok (SLO)

30 July 2024; 14:00	Netherlands	29–24	Spain	Paris Expo Porte de Versailles, Paris; Attendance: 5,834; Referees: Hansen, Madsen (DEN)
30 July 2024; 14:00	Van Wetering 5	(14–12)	Arcos 6	Paris Expo Porte de Versailles, Paris; Attendance: 5,834; Referees: Hansen, Madsen (DEN)
30 July 2024; 14:00	1× (yellow card) 1× (suspension)	Report	1× (yellow card) 2× (suspension)	Paris Expo Porte de Versailles, Paris; Attendance: 5,834; Referees: Hansen, Madsen (DEN)

1 August 2024; 09:00	Netherlands	31–24	Brazil	Paris Expo Porte de Versailles, Paris; Attendance: 5,653; Referees: A. Konjičanin, D. Konjičanin (BIH)
1 August 2024; 09:00	Van Wetering 6	(17–13)	Bitolo 7	Paris Expo Porte de Versailles, Paris; Attendance: 5,653; Referees: A. Konjičanin, D. Konjičanin (BIH)
1 August 2024; 09:00	1× (suspension)	Report	3× (suspension) 1× (red card)	Paris Expo Porte de Versailles, Paris; Attendance: 5,653; Referees: A. Konjičanin, D. Konjičanin (BIH)

3 August 2024; 09:00	Hungary	26–30	Netherlands	Paris Expo Porte de Versailles, Paris; Attendance: 5,841; Referees: C. Bonaventura, J. Bonaventura (FRA)
3 August 2024; 09:00	Győri-Lukács, Klujber 5	(16–19)	Abbingh 7	Paris Expo Porte de Versailles, Paris; Attendance: 5,841; Referees: C. Bonaventura, J. Bonaventura (FRA)
3 August 2024; 09:00	1× (yellow card) 4× (suspension)	Report	3× (suspension)	Paris Expo Porte de Versailles, Paris; Attendance: 5,841; Referees: C. Bonaventura, J. Bonaventura (FRA)

Quarterfinals

6 August 2024; 09:30	Denmark	29–25	Netherlands	Stade Pierre-Mauroy, Lille; Attendance: 20,372; Referees: Kurtagic, Wetterwik (SWE)
6 August 2024; 09:30	Friis, Hansen 6	(11–10)	Housheer, Van Wetering 7	Stade Pierre-Mauroy, Lille; Attendance: 20,372; Referees: Kurtagic, Wetterwik (SWE)
6 August 2024; 09:30	5× (suspension) 1× (red card)	Report	5× (suspension)	Stade Pierre-Mauroy, Lille; Attendance: 20,372; Referees: Kurtagic, Wetterwik (SWE)

== Judo ==
The Netherlands has qualified ten judokas via the IJF World Ranking List and continental quotas in Europe.

Athlete	Event	Round of 64	Round of 32	Round of 16	Quarterfinals	Semifinals	Repechage	Final / BM	
Athlete	Event	Opposition Result	Opposition Result	Opposition Result	Opposition Result	Opposition Result	Opposition Result	Opposition Result	Rank
Tornike Tsjakadoea	Men's −60 kg	—N/a	Smetov (KAZ); L 00–10	Did not advance					
Frank de Wit	Men's −81 kg	Bye	Cumbo (VAN); W 10–00	Makhmadbekov (TJK); L 00–01	Did not advance				
Noël van 't End	Men's −90 kg	—N/a	Macedo (BRA); L 00–10	Did not advance					
Michael Korrel	Men's −100 kg	—N/a	Bye	Kostoev (UAE); W 01–00	Turoboyev (UZB); L 00–11	Did not advance	Paltchik (ISR); L 00–10	Did not advance	=7
Jelle Snippe	Men's +100 kg	—N/a	Krpálek (CZE); L 00–10	Did not advance					
Julie Beurskens	Women's −57 kg	—N/a	Starke (GER); L 01–11	Did not advance					
Joanne van Lieshout	Women's −63 kg	—N/a	Bye	Kim (KOR); L 00–01	Did not advance				
Sanne van Dijke	Women's −70 kg	—N/a	Bye	Samardžić (BIH); W 10–00	Niizoe (JPN); W 01–00	Matić (CRO); L 00–10	Bye	Willems (BEL); L 00–01	=5
Guusje Steenhuis	Women's −78 kg	—N/a	Bye	Pacut-Kłoczko (POL); W 01–00	Lanir (ISR); L 00–10	Did not advance	Takayama (JPN); L 00–10	Did not advance	=7
Marit Kamps	Women's +78 kg	—N/a	Homan (UKR); W 10–00	Hershko (ISR); L 00–10	Did not advance				

Mixed

Athlete	Event	Round of 32	Round of 16	Quarterfinals	Semifinals	Repechage	Final / BM	
Athlete	Event	Opposition Result	Opposition Result	Opposition Result	Opposition Result	Opposition Result	Opposition Result	Rank
Julie Beurskens; Tornike Tsjakadoea; Joanne van Lieshout; Noël van 't End; Marit Kamps; Michael Korrel	Team	Bye	Serbia; L 2–4	Did not advance				

== Rowing ==
Dutch rowers qualified boats in each of the following classes through the 2023 World Rowing Championships in Belgrade, Serbia.

Men

Athlete	Event	Heats		Repechage		Quarterfinals		Semifinals		Final	
Athlete	Event	Time	Rank	Time	Rank	Time	Rank	Time	Rank	Time	Rank
Simon van Dorp	Single sculls	6:49.93	1 QF	Bye		6:49.96	1 SA/B	6:42.39	1 FA	6:44.72	3rd place, bronze medalist(s)
Stef Broenink; Melvin Twellaar	Double sculls	6:14.13	1 SA/B	Bye		—N/a		6:13.60	1 FA	6:13.92	2nd place, silver medalist(s)
Finn Florijn; Koen Metsemakers; Lennart van Lierop; Tone Wieten	Quadruple sculls	5:41.69	1 FA	Bye		—N/a				5:42.00	1st place, gold medalist(s)
Eli Brouwer; Guus Mollee; Rik Rienks; Nelson Ritsema	Coxless four	6:08.75	4 R	5:56.68	4 FB	—N/a				5:56.35	7
Sander de Graaf; Ruben Knab; Mick Makker; Olav Molenaar; Ralf Rienks; Jacob van de Kerkhof; Jan van der Bij; Dieuwke Fetter (c)	Eight	5:31.82	2 R	5:27.58	1 FA	—N/a				5:23.92	2nd place, silver medalist(s)

Women

Athlete	Event	Heats		Repechage		Quarterfinals		Semifinals		Final	
Athlete	Event	Time	Rank	Time	Rank	Time	Rank	Time	Rank	Time	Rank
Karolien Florijn	Single sculls	7:36.90	1 QF	Bye		7:29.07	1 SA/B	7:21.26	1 FA	7:17.28	1st place, gold medalist(s)
Lisa Scheenaard; Martine Veldhuis	Double sculls	7:04.56	4 R	7:08.42	1 SA/B	—N/a		6:50.20	2 FA	6:54.24	4
Roos de Jong; Tessa Dullemans; Bente Paulis; Laila Youssifou	Quadruple sculls	6:17.12	1 FA	Bye		—N/a				6:16.46	2nd place, silver medalist(s)
Ymkje Clevering; Veronique Meester	Coxless pair	7:17.81	1 SA/B	Bye		—N/a		7:10.16	1 FA	6:58.67	1st place, gold medalist(s)
Benthe Boonstra; Hermijntje Drenth; Tinka Offereins; Marloes Oldenburg	Coxless four	6:43.71	1 FA	Bye		—N/a				6:27.13	1st place, gold medalist(s)

Qualification Legend: FA=Final A (medal); FB=Final B (non-medal); FC=Final C (non-medal); FD=Final D (non-medal); FE=Final E (non-medal); FF=Final F (non-medal); SA/B=Semifinals A/B; SC/D=Semifinals C/D; SE/F=Semifinals E/F; QF=Quarterfinals; R=Repechage

== Sailing ==
Dutch sailors qualified one boat in each of the following classes through the 2023 Sailing World Championships in The Hague, Netherlands.

Elimination events
Windfoiling

Athlete	Event	Opening rounds																Quarterfinal	Semifinal	Final	Final rank
Athlete	Event	1	2	3	4	5	6	7	8	9	10	11	12	13	14	Net points	Rank	Quarterfinal	Semifinal	Final	Final rank
Luuc van Opzeeland	Men's IQFoil	~~25~~	9	2	1	6	1	3	~~24~~	11	14	16	1	6	—N/a	70	5 QF	1 SF	1 F	3	3rd place, bronze medalist(s)
Sara Wennekes	Women's IQFoil	10.3	12	~~21~~	15	4	10	19	16	8	15	~~20~~	12	17	16	154.3	16	Did not advance			16

Kitesurfing

Athlete	Event	Opening rounds								Semifinals						Final						Final rank
Athlete	Event	1	2	3	4	5	6	Net points	Rank	SF1	SF2	SF3	SF4	SF5	SF6	F1	F2	F3	F4	F5	F6	Final rank
Annelous Lammerts	Women's Formula Kite	~~14~~	4	5	5	7	2	23	4 SF	1 F	—N/a					4	2	—N/a				3rd place, bronze medalist(s)

Medal race events

Athlete	Event	Race													Net points	Final rank
Athlete	Event	1	2	3	4	5	6	7	8	9	10	11	12	M*	Net points	Final rank
Duko Bos	Men's ILCA 7	1	20	~~29~~	27	14	16	4	28	—N/a				EL	110	15
Marit Bouwmeester	Women's ILCA 6	4	1	2	4	2	3	3	11	~~20~~	—N/a			8	38	1st place, gold medalist(s)
Bart Lambriex; Floris van de Werken	Men's 49er	13	1	7	16	7	11	~~19~~	6	7	13	1	13	14	99	6
Odile van Aanholt; Annette Duetz	Women's 49er FX	5	1	1	10	8	5	~~19~~	3	2	15	4	14	6	74	1st place, gold medalist(s)
Bjarne Bouwer; Laila van der Meer	Mixed Nacra 17	4	~~20~~	9	7	8	8	6	7	3	2	11	5	8	78	6

M = Medal race; EL = Eliminated – did not advance into the medal race

== Skateboarding ==
The Netherlands entered two female skateboarders to compete in the following event at the Games.

Athlete	Event	Qualification		Final	
Athlete	Event	Score	Rank	Score	Rank
Roos Zwetsloot	Women's street	233.71	10	Did not advance	
Keet Oldenbeuving	Women's street	210.78	15	Did not advance	

== Swimming ==
Dutch swimmers achieved the entry standards in the following events for Paris 2024 (a maximum of two swimmers under the Olympic Qualifying Time (OST) and potentially at the Olympic Consideration Time (OCT)):

Men

Athlete	Event	Heat		Semifinal		Final	
Athlete	Event	Time	Rank	Time	Rank	Time	Rank
Kenzo Simons	50 m freestyle	22.15	27	Did not advance			
Renzo Tjon-A-Joe	50 m freestyle	22.10	23	Did not advance			
Sean Niewold	100 m freestyle	48.82	=23	Did not advance			
Kai van Westering	100 m backstroke	54.21	=21	Did not advance			
Kai van Westering	200 m backstroke	1:58.99	23	Did not advance			
Caspar Corbeau	100 m breaststroke	59.04	1 Q	59.24	5 Q	59.98	8
Arno Kamminga	100 m breaststroke	59.39	=4 Q	59.12	3 Q	59.32	6
Caspar Corbeau	200 m breaststroke	2:09.78	4 Q	2:09.52	4 Q	2:07.90	3rd place, bronze medalist(s)
Arno Kamminga	200 m breaststroke	2:10.53	12 Q	WD		Did not advance	
Nyls Korstanje	100 m butterfly	51.17	8 Q	50.59	4 Q	50.83	6
Nyls Korstanje; Caspar Corbeau; Kai van Westering; Stan Pijnenburg	4 × 100 m medley relay	3:31.80	4 Q	—N/a		3:32.52	8

Women

Athlete	Event	Heat		Semifinal		Final	
Athlete	Event	Time	Rank	Time	Rank	Time	Rank
Kim Busch	50 m freestyle	24.87	=18	Did not advance			
Valerie van Roon	50 m freestyle	24.72	=15 Q	24.67	12	Did not advance	
Marrit Steenbergen	100 m freestyle	53.22	4 Q	52.86	5 Q	52.83	7
Kira Toussaint	100 m backstroke	59.84	10 Q	1:00.37	14	Did not advance	
Maaike de Waard	100 m backstroke	1:00.12	13 Q	1:00.22	13	Did not advance	
Tes Schouten	100 m breaststroke	1:06.69	14 Q	1:06.55	10	Did not advance	
Tes Schouten	200 m breaststroke	2:23.08	2 Q	2:22.74	3 Q	2:21.05	3rd place, bronze medalist(s)
Tessa Giele	100 m butterfly	57.89	15 Q	57.91	15	Did not advance	
Marrit Steenbergen	200 m individual medley	2:13.21	20	Did not advance			
Kim Busch; Tessa Giele; Marrit Steenbergen; Sam van Nunen	4 × 100 m freestyle relay	3:36.78	9	—N/a		Did not advance	
Imani de Jong; Silke Holkenborg; Janna van Kooten; Marrit Steenbergen	4 × 200 m freestyle relay	7:57.58	12	—N/a		Did not advance	
Marrit Steenbergen; Maaike de Waard; Tes Schouten; Tessa Giele	4 × 100 m medley relay	3:57.48	8 Q	—N/a		3:59.52	8
Sharon van Rouwendaal	10 km open water	—N/a				2:03:34.2	1st place, gold medalist(s)

Mixed

Athlete	Event	Heat		Final	
Athlete	Event	Time	Rank	Time	Rank
Kai van Westering; Caspar Corbeau; Tessa Giele; Marrit Steenbergen; Nyls Korstanje; Kira Toussaint	4 × 100 m medley relay	3:43.60	4 Q	3:43.12	6

== Table tennis ==
The Netherlands entered one athlete into the table tennis competition. Britt Eerland qualified for the games by winning the second available spot for the women's singles event at the 2024 European Qualification Tournament in Sarajevo, Bosnia and Herzegovina.

Athlete	Event	Round of 64	Round of 32	Round of 16	Quarterfinals	Semifinals	Final / BM	
Athlete	Event	Opposition Result	Opposition Result	Opposition Result	Opposition Result	Opposition Result	Opposition Result	Rank
Britt Eerland	Women's singles	Goda (EGY); W 4–0	Matelová (CZE); W 4–3	Chen (CHN); L 1–4	Did not advance			

== Tennis ==
The Netherlands entered six tennis players (four men and two women) into the Olympic tournament. Tallon Griekspoor has guaranteed his participation as one of the top-56 eligible players in the ATP World Rankings, while Arantxa Rus did the same as the top-56 eligible players in the WTA World Rankings, which were completed on 10th June 2024. Additionally, two pairs of male players and one pair of female players also secured a spot in the men's doubles event as one of the top 32 players in the doubles ranking.

Men

Athlete	Event	Round of 64	Round of 32	Round of 16	Quarterfinals	Semifinals	Final / BM	
Athlete	Event	Opposition Score	Opposition Score	Opposition Score	Opposition Score	Opposition Score	Opposition Score	Rank
Tallon Griekspoor	Singles	P. Tsitsipas (GRE); W 6–2, 6–3	Alcaraz (ESP); L 1–6, 6–7^{(3–7)}	Did not advance				
Robin Haase	Singles	Ofner (AUT); L 5–7, 2–6	Did not advance					
Tallon Griekspoor; Wesley Koolhof	Doubles	—N/a	Fucsovics / Marozsán (HUN); W 6–2, 6–3	Alcaraz / Nadal (ESP); L 4–6, 7–6^{(7–2)}, [2–10]	Did not advance			
Jean-Julien Rojer; Robin Haase	Doubles	—N/a	Etcheverry / Navone (ARG); W 7–6^{(7–3)}, 7–6^{(7–4)}	Fritz / Paul (USA); L 3–6, 4–6	Did not advance			

Women

Athlete	Event	Round of 64	Round of 32	Round of 16	Quarterfinals	Semifinals	Final / BM	
Athlete	Event	Opposition Score	Opposition Score	Opposition Score	Opposition Score	Opposition Score	Opposition Score	Rank
Arantxa Rus	Singles	Gadecki (AUS); W 6–4, 6–1	Zheng (CHN); L 2–6, 4–6	Did not advance				
Arantxa Rus; Demi Schuurs	Doubles	—N/a	Garcia / Parry (FRA); L 7–6^{(7–2)}, 3–6, [4–10]	Did not advance				

Mixed

Athlete	Event	Round of 16	Quarterfinals	Semifinals	Final / BM	
Athlete	Event	Opposition Score	Opposition Score	Opposition Score	Opposition Score	Rank
Demi Schuurs; Wesley Koolhof	Mixed doubles	Sakkari / S. Tsitsipas (GRE); W 6–4, 7–6^{(7–3)}	Errani / Vavassori (ITA); W 6–7^{(4–7)}, 6–3, [11–9]	Xin Wang / Zhang (CHN); L 6–2, 4–6, [4–10]	Dabrowski / Auger-Aliassime (CAN); L 3–6, 6–7^{(2–7)}	4

== Triathlon ==
The Netherlands confirmed four quota places (two per gender) in the triathlon events for Paris by virtue of winning one of two available spots at the 2024 World Triathlon Mixed Relay Qualification Event in Huatulco, Mexico.

Individual

Athlete	Event	Time						Rank
Athlete	Event	Swim (1.5 km)	Trans 1	Bike (40 km)	Trans 2	Run (10 km)	Total	Rank
Mitch Kolkman	Men's	20:39	0:46	51:58	0:27	33:31	1:47:21	26
Richard Murray	Men's	22:43	0:50	54:48	0:23	32:11	1:50:55	44
Maya Kingma	Women's	22:20	0:59	58:25	0:27	34:42	1:56:53	7
Rachel Klamer	Women's	23:30	1:00	58:15	0:29	34:25	1:57:39	14

Relay

Athlete	Event	Time						Rank
Athlete	Event	Swim (300 m)	Trans 1	Bike (7 km)	Trans 2	Run (2 km)	Total	Rank
Mitch Kolkman	Mixed relay	4:17	1:01	9:35	0:22	5:03	20:18	—N/a
Maya Kingma	Mixed relay	4:59	1:14	10:26	0:25	5:55	22:59	—N/a
Richard Murray	Mixed relay	4:43	1:02	9:37	0:25	5:15	21:02	—N/a
Rachel Klamer	Mixed relay	5:11	1:12	10:34	0:27	5:54	23:18	—N/a
Total	Mixed relay	—N/a					1:27:37	10

== Volleyball ==
=== Beach ===
The Netherlands men's and women's pairs qualified for Paris based on the FIVB Beach Volleyball Olympic Ranking. Another women's pair qualified through winning the 2024 CEV Continental Cup Final in Jūrmala, Latvia, but no athletes met the NOC requirement and the quota was forfeited.

Athletes	Event	Preliminary round				Round of 16	Quarterfinal	Semifinal	Final / BM	
Athletes	Event	Opposition Score	Opposition Score	Opposition Score	Rank	Opposition Score	Opposition Score	Opposition Score	Opposition Score	Rank
Stefan Boermans; Yorick de Groot	Men's	Herrera / Gavira (ESP); W 21–15, 21–15	Evans / Budinger (USA); W 21–13, 21–15	Krou / Gauthier-Rat (FRA); W 21–15, 21–16	1 Q	Perušič / Schweiner (CZE); W 21–18, 21–16	Ehlers / Wickler (GER); L 20–22, 15–21	Did not advance		5
Matthew Immers; Steven van de Velde	Men's	Ranghieri / Carambula (ITA); L 20–22, 21–19, 13–15	M. Grimalt / E. Grimalt (CHI); W 21–19, 21–16	Mol / Sørum (NOR); L 16–21, 19–21	2 Q	Evandro / Arthur (BRA); L 16–21, 16–21	Did not advance			9
Katja Stam; Raïsa Schoon	Women's	Paulikienė / Raupelytė (LTU); W 21–19, 21–17	Akiko / Ishii (JPN); W 21–16, 21–14	Carol / Bárbara (BRA); L 21–16, 17–21, 17–19	2 Q	Álvarez M / Moreno (ESP); L 21–18, 19–21, 13–15	Did not advance			9

Selection of convicted child rapist

The Dutch Olympic Committee, NOC*NSF, selected Steven van de Velde to represent them in beach volleyball. Van de Velde pleaded guilty in 2016 to three counts of raping a 12-year-old child in the United Kingdom. The British judge said that he should not be able to continue his Olympic ambitions. He had initially fled to the Netherlands after the rapes, which took place in 2014, before being extradited back to the UK in 2016.

When asked about the decision to select Van de Velde, Michel Everaert, the head of Nederlandse Volleybalbond (NeVoBo; Dutch Volleyball Federation), said that "[Van de Velde] was convicted at the time according to English law and he has served his sentence. [...He] has now been fully reintegrated into the Dutch volleyball community" and "[is] an exemplary professional and human being". Sentenced on 21 March 2016 to four years in prison, he was transferred to the Netherlands due to an extradition treaty, where he was re-sentenced under Dutch law and subsequently released on 17 March 2017. Comments he made upon his release were criticized by the British child protection charity NSPCC as showing no remorse and being full of self-pity.

In June 2024, NeVoBo described the conviction as a "black period" and said Van de Velde was "obviously not happy" about it being brought up ahead of his appearance at the Olympics. NeVoBo said that they have a professionally guided process for convicted criminals to partake in sport, and that Van de Velde met all their conditions and followed all guidelines for Olympic participation. The IOC refused to comment. There was significant criticism directed at NOC*NSF for the selection. Advisors on safety in sport said the Dutch nonchalance towards the selection was concerning, and that Van de Velde's participation "sends a dangerous message that medals and money mean more than [the] safety [of minors in sports]." A non-profit that supports survivors of sexual abuse criticized Dutch sports media for a lack of attention on Van de Velde, especially when compared to how much the same media reported on inconsequential news, like footballer Memphis Depay's choice of headwear.

The British Olympic Association "raised serious concerns" when Van de Velde was confirmed, and the Australian Olympic Committee later said that a convicted rapist would never be allowed to be involved with their team, due to their safeguarding rules. The Dutch Olympic Committee faced international criticism. In a statement on their website, NeVoBo criticized foreign media outlets for "rekindl[ing] the past". A petition on the online platform Change.org called for the convicted athlete to be disqualified from the Paris Games. The petition had been signed more than 90,000 times before Van de Velde's first match. On 17 July, NOC*NSF said that Van de Velde would not stay in the Olympic Village but would be provided alternative accommodation and security elsewhere. In the statement, the NOC*NSF stated that it regretted "the impact of the unforeseen renewed attention to anyone facing trauma from sexual offences and cross-border behaviour." On 25 July, leaders of anti-violence organizations called for the IOC to investigate how Van de Velde was allowed to be selected. When he debuted at the Games on 28 July, his name being announced was met with audible booing from the crowd as well as typical announcement applause. Fans at the stadium asked about him by the BBC were largely disapproving that he was allowed to compete, with the exception of Dutch fans, many of whom opined that he had served his sentence.

=== Indoor ===
Summary

Team	Event	Group stage				Quarterfinal	Semifinal	Final / BM	
Team	Event	Opposition Score	Opposition Score	Opposition Score	Rank	Opposition Score	Opposition Score	Opposition Score	Rank
Netherlands women's	Women's tournament	Turkey; L 2–3	Italy; L 0–3	Dominican Republic; L 1–3	4	Did not advance			10

==== Women's tournament ====
Netherlands women's volleyball team qualified for the Olympics by virtue of their rank in the World Ranking qualification.

Team roster

The roster was announced on 6 July 2024.

Head coach: (Germany) Felix Koslowski

- 4 Celeste Plak OP
- 5 Jolien Knollema OH
- 7 Juliët Lohuis MB
- 10 Sarah van Aalen S
- 11 Anne Buijs OH
- 12 Britt Bongaerts S
- 16 Indy Baijens MB
- 18 Marrit Jasper OH
- 19 Nika Daalderop (c) OH
- 23 Eline Timmerman MB
- 25 Florien Reesink L
- 26 Elles Dambrink OP

Group play

Pos	Team	Pld	W	L	Pts	SW	SL	SR	SPW	SPL	SPR	Qualification
1	Italy	3	3	0	9	9	1	9.000	253	199	1.271	Quarter-finals
2	Turkey	3	2	1	5	6	6	1.000	250	262	0.954	Quarter-finals
3	Dominican Republic	3	1	2	3	5	7	0.714	264	284	0.930	Quarter-finals
4	Netherlands	3	0	3	1	3	9	0.333	260	282	0.922	

Source: Olympics
Rules for classification: Tiebreakers

29 July 2024; 09:00	Turkey	3–2	Netherlands	South Paris Arena 1, Paris; Attendance: 9,471; Referees: Denny Cespedes (DOM), Stefano Cesare (ITA)
29 July 2024; 09:00	(19–25, 19–25, 25–22, 25–22, 15–13); P2 Report			South Paris Arena 1, Paris; Attendance: 9,471; Referees: Denny Cespedes (DOM), Stefano Cesare (ITA)

1 August 2024; 17:00	Italy	3–0	Netherlands	South Paris Arena 1, Paris; Attendance: 9,400; Referees: Angela Grass (BRA), Sumie Myoi (JPN)
1 August 2024; 17:00	(29–27, 25–18, 25–19); P2 Report			South Paris Arena 1, Paris; Attendance: 9,400; Referees: Angela Grass (BRA), Sumie Myoi (JPN)

3 August 2024; 09:00	Netherlands	1–3	Dominican Republic	South Paris Arena 1, Paris; Attendance: 9,433; Referees: Scott Dziewirz (CAN), Ivaylo Ivanov (BUL)
3 August 2024; 09:00	(25–22, 21–25, 17–25, 26–28); P2 Report			South Paris Arena 1, Paris; Attendance: 9,433; Referees: Scott Dziewirz (CAN), Ivaylo Ivanov (BUL)

== Water polo ==
Summary

Key:
- P – Match decided by penalty-shootout.

Team	Event	Group stage					Quarterfinal	Semifinal	Final / BM	
Team	Event	Opposition Score	Opposition Score	Opposition Score	Opposition Score	Rank	Opposition Score	Opposition Score	Opposition Score	Rank
Netherlands women's	Women's tournament	Hungary; W 10–8	China; W 15–11	Australia; L 14–15^{P}	Canada; W 20–11	2 Q	Italy; W 11–8	Spain; L 18–19^{P}	United States; W 11–10	3rd place, bronze medalist(s)

=== Women's tournament ===
Netherlands women's national water polo team qualified for the Olympics by advancing to the final match and securing an outright berth at the 2023 World Aquatics Championships in Fukuoka, Japan.

Team roster

The roster was announced on 19 June 2024.

Head coach: (Greece) Evangelos Doudesis

- 1 Laura Aarts GK
- 2 Iris Wolves CF
- 3 Brigitte Sleeking D
- 4 Sabrina van der Sloot (c) D
- 5 Maartje Keuning W
- 6 Simone van de Kraats W
- 7 Bente Rogge CB
- 8 Vivian Sevenich CF
- 9 Kitty-Lynn Joustra CF
- 10 Lieke Rogge D
- 11 Lola Moolhuijzen D
- 12 Nina ten Broek CB
- 13 Sarah Buis GK

Group play

Pos	Team	Pld	W	PSW	PSL	L	GF	GA	GD	Pts	Qualification
1	Australia	4	2	2	0	0	33	28	+5	10 (Note: Netherlands 14–15 Australia)	Quarterfinals
2	Netherlands	4	3	0	1	0	52	37	+15	10	Quarterfinals
3	Hungary	4	2	0	1	1	46	37	+9	7	Quarterfinals
4	Canada	4	1	0	0	3	37	49	−12	3	Quarterfinals
5	China	4	0	0	0	4	34	51	−17	0	

Source: Olympics
Rules for classification: 1) Points; 2) Head-to-head points; 3) Head-to-head goal difference; 4) Head-to-head goals scored; 5) Goal difference.
Notes:

27 July 2024; 14:00 v	Report	Netherlands	10–8	Hungary	Paris Aquatic Centre, Paris; Referees: Alessia Ferrari (ITA), Sébastien Dervieux (FRA)
27 July 2024; 14:00 v	Report	Score by quarters: 4–2, 0–1, 2–3, 4–2			Paris Aquatic Centre, Paris; Referees: Alessia Ferrari (ITA), Sébastien Dervieux (FRA)
27 July 2024; 14:00 v	Report	B. Rogge 3	Goals	Vályi 3	Paris Aquatic Centre, Paris; Referees: Alessia Ferrari (ITA), Sébastien Dervieux (FRA)

29 July 2024; 18:30 v	Report	China	11–15	Netherlands	Paris Aquatic Centre, Paris; Referees: Alessia Ferrari (ITA), Chisato Kurosaki (JPN)
29 July 2024; 18:30 v	Report	Score by quarters: 4–1, 4–4, 1–5, 2–5			Paris Aquatic Centre, Paris; Referees: Alessia Ferrari (ITA), Chisato Kurosaki (JPN)
29 July 2024; 18:30 v	Report	three players 2	Goals	Keuning, Van der Sloot 3	Paris Aquatic Centre, Paris; Referees: Alessia Ferrari (ITA), Chisato Kurosaki (JPN)

31 July 2024; 14:00 v	Report	Netherlands	14–15 (PSO)	Australia	Paris Aquatic Centre, Paris; Referees: Jennifer McCall (USA), Natalia Markopoulou (GRE)
31 July 2024; 14:00 v	Report	Score by quarters: 3–1, 1–2, 1–3, 2–1 PSO: 7–8			Paris Aquatic Centre, Paris; Referees: Jennifer McCall (USA), Natalia Markopoulou (GRE)
31 July 2024; 14:00 v	Report	Van de Kraats, Van der Sloot 2	Goals	Green, Williams 2	Paris Aquatic Centre, Paris; Referees: Jennifer McCall (USA), Natalia Markopoulou (GRE)

4 August 2024; 18:30 v	Report	Canada	11–20	Netherlands	Paris Aquatic Centre, Paris; Referees: Jennifer McCall (USA), Aurélie Blanchard (FRA)
4 August 2024; 18:30 v	Report	Score by quarters: 4–5, 2–6, 3–4, 2–5			Paris Aquatic Centre, Paris; Referees: Jennifer McCall (USA), Aurélie Blanchard (FRA)
4 August 2024; 18:30 v	Report	Bakoc 3	Goals	L. Rogge 5	Paris Aquatic Centre, Paris; Referees: Jennifer McCall (USA), Aurélie Blanchard (FRA)

Quarterfinals

6 August 2024; 15:35 v	Report	Netherlands	11–8	Italy	Paris La Défense Arena, Paris; Referees: Jennifer McCall (USA), Nóra Debreceni (HUN)
6 August 2024; 15:35 v	Report	Score by quarters: 2–2, 3–2, 1–1, 5–3			Paris La Défense Arena, Paris; Referees: Jennifer McCall (USA), Nóra Debreceni (HUN)
6 August 2024; 15:35 v	Report	four players 2	Goals	Marletta 3	Paris La Défense Arena, Paris; Referees: Jennifer McCall (USA), Nóra Debreceni (HUN)

Semifinals

8 August 2024; 14:35 v	Report	Netherlands	18–19 (PSO)	Spain	Paris La Défense Arena, Paris; Referees: Boris Margeta (SLO), Alessia Ferrari (ITA)
8 August 2024; 14:35 v	Report	Score by quarters: 1–6, 4–4, 6–1, 3–3 PSO: 4–5			Paris La Défense Arena, Paris; Referees: Boris Margeta (SLO), Alessia Ferrari (ITA)
8 August 2024; 14:35 v	Report	Van de Kraats 4	Goals	Forca 5	Paris La Défense Arena, Paris; Referees: Boris Margeta (SLO), Alessia Ferrari (ITA)

Bronze medal match

10 August 2024; 10:35 v	Report	United States	10–11	Netherlands	Paris La Défense Arena, Paris; Referees: Marta Cabañas (ESP), Rafaele Colombo (ITA)
10 August 2024; 10:35 v	Report	Score by quarters: 3–2, 4–1, 2–3, 1–5			Paris La Défense Arena, Paris; Referees: Marta Cabañas (ESP), Rafaele Colombo (ITA)
10 August 2024; 10:35 v	Report	three players 2	Goals	Van der Sloot 6	Paris La Défense Arena, Paris; Referees: Marta Cabañas (ESP), Rafaele Colombo (ITA)

== See also ==
- Netherlands at the 2024 Winter Youth Olympics
