= Georgina Brayshaw =

British rower (born 1993)

Georgina Brayshaw MBE
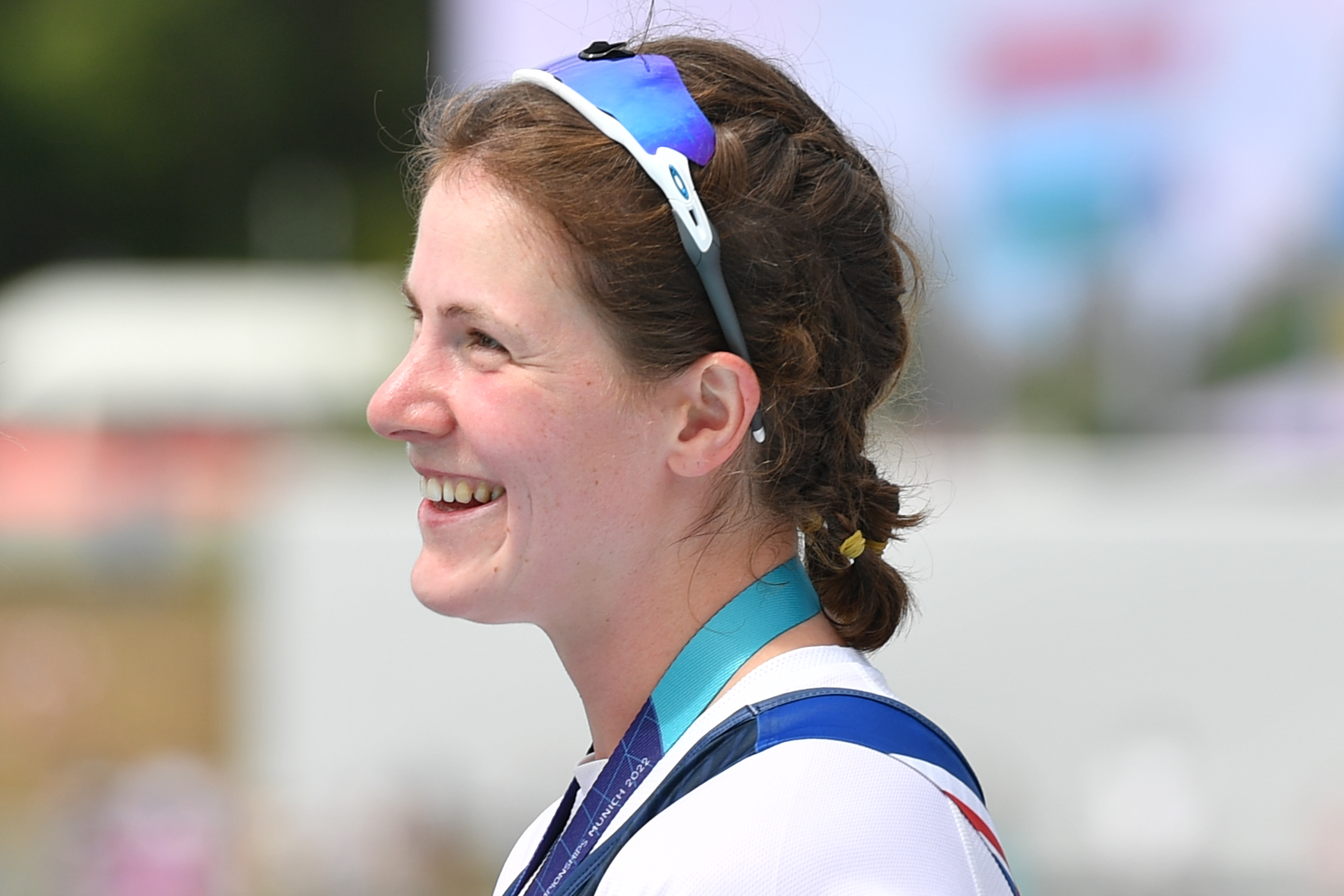
- Brayshaw at the 2022 European Championships

Personal information
- Full name: Georgina Megan Brayshaw
- Nickname: Georgie
- Born: 14 October 1993 (age 33) Leeds, England

Sport
- Country: Great Britain
- Sport: Rowing
- Club: Leander Club
Medal record
Women's rowing
Representing Great Britain
Olympic Games
Gold medal – first place	2024 Paris	Quadruple sculls
World Championships
Gold medal – first place	2023 Belgrade	Quadruple sculls
Bronze medal – third place	2022 Račice	Quadruple sculls
European Championships
Gold medal – first place	2022 Oberschleißheim	Quadruple sculls
Gold medal – first place	2024 Szeged	Quadruple sculls
Bronze medal – third place	2023 Bled	Quadruple sculls

Georgina Megan Brayshaw (born 14 October 1993) is a British professional rower and a member of the Great Britain Rowing Team. She is a double European champion, World champion and Olympic gold medallist.

== Serious accident ==
At the age of 15, Georgina was involved in a serious horse-riding accident that left her in a coma for nine days and resulted in paralysis on her left side. The accident occurred while she was galloping through a field, and she has no memory of the incident itself. Despite the severity of her injuries, which required her to relearn how to use the left side of her body, Georgina regained most bodily functions after a year and fueled her characteristic resilient attitude. "I just love proving people wrong" has since become her catchphrase and went on to drive her athletic aspirations.

== Career ==
=== Outset ===
Originally from Leeds, Brayshaw's introduction to rowing came during her second year at the University of Northampton. Despite not initially making the cut for the GB Start project, she continued to pursue the sport, joining Leeds Rowing Club after graduation and eventually securing a place in the GB Start Olympic Pathway Programme in 2014. Georgina quickly showed an aptitude for the sport and began climbing the ranks, moving to Leander Club in 2017, and joining the British Rowing Women's Squad in 2020.

=== Major competitions ===
Brayshaw won her first major gold medal in the quadruple sculls at the 2022 European Rowing Championships in Munich, Germany.

At the 2023 World Rowing Championships in Belgrade, she won the World Championship gold medal in the Stroke (position) seat of the Quadruple sculls with Lauren Henry, Hannah Scott and Lola Anderson. The same crew continued to win Gold's with the same crew for the 2024 European Rowing Championships in Szeged, Hungary and 2024 World Rowing Cup II in Lucerne, Switzerland.

At the 2024 Paris Summer Olympics, Georgina and her team won Great Britain’s first-ever Olympic gold medal in the Women’s Quadruple Sculls boat class.

=== Other accolades ===
In February 2023, Brayshaw won the openweight women's single (W1X) category of GB Rowing open senior trials in Boston Lincolnshire. As a result she was ranked no.1 in the senior women's team at this time.

Georgina currently holds the world record for the 5 km distance on the RP3 rowing machine (Female, Open Category, Open Weight)

== Major achievements ==
2024

- 1st - Olympic Championships, Paris, France
- 1st - European Championships, Szeged, Hungary
- 1st - World Rowing Cup, Lucerne, Switzerland

2023

- 1st - World Championships, Belgrade, Serbia
- 3rd - European Championships, Bled, Slovenia
- 2nd - World Rowing Cup, Lucerne, Switzerland
- 2nd - World Rowing Cup, Varese, Italy

2022

- 3rd - World Championships, Racice, Czech Republic
- 1st - European Championships, Munich, Germany
- 2nd - World Rowing Cup, Lucerne, Switzerland.

== Awards ==
In April 2024, Brayshaw was named Great Britain Rowing Team Women's Olympic Athlete of the Year

She was awarded an MBE in the 2025 New Year Honours for services to rowing.
