= 2024 European Rowing U23 Championships =

- Venue: Meriç River
- Location: Edirne, Turkey
- Dates: 7–8 September 2024

The 2024 European Rowing U23 Championships took place on the Meriç River in Edirne, Turkey, from 7–8 September 2024.

== Medal table ==
* Host nation (Turkey)

Rank	Nation	Gold	Silver	Bronze	Total
1	Romania (ROU)	9	0	0	9
2	Turkey (TUR)*	3	2	2	7
3	Poland (POL)	2	4	1	7
4	Switzerland (SUI)	2	1	0	3
–	Individual Neutral Athletes	1	4	0	5
5	Greece (GRE)	1	0	5	6
6	Portugal (POR)	1	0	1	2
7	Italy (ITA)	0	2	1	3
8	Croatia (CRO)	0	2	0	2
9	Hungary (HUN)	0	1	1	2
10	Denmark (DEN)	0	1	0	1
11	Belgium (BEL)	0	0	1	1
11	Czech Republic (CZE)	0	0	1	1
11	Lithuania (LTU)	0	0	1	1
11	Spain (ESP)	0	0	1	1
Totals (14 entries)		19	17	15	51

== Medalists ==
=== Men ===
Event	Gold		Silver		Bronze	
Lightweight Single Sculls (BLM1x)	Halil Kaan Köroğlu; Turkey	7:09.47	Mikita Karneyeu; Individual Neutral Athletes	7:14.84	Duarte Castro; Portugal	7:16.59
Lightweight Double (BLM2x)	Portugal (b) João Santos (s) Andre Ferreira	6:27.48	Hungary (b) Balázs Szőllősi (s) Ferenc Szigeti	6:29.22	Italy (b) Paolo Gregori (s) Nicolò Demiliani	6:30.28
Single Sculls (BM1x)	Cevdet Ege Mutlu; Turkey	6:46.62	Aleksandr Kovalskii; Individual Neutral Athletes	6:49.52	Panagiotis Makrygiannis; Greece	6:49.82
Pair (BM2-)	Romania (b) Andrei Mandrila (s) Leontin Nutescu	6:36.63	Individual Neutral Athletes (b) Anton Kupalau (s) Dzianis Klimiato	6:37.99	Greece (b) Zissis Boukouvalas (s) Apostolos Lykomitros	6:39.38
Double Sculls (BM2x)	Poland (b) Jakub Woźniak (s) Konrad Domanski	6:22.17	Croatia (b) Davor Poljancic (s) Ivan Talaja	6:24.37	Czech Republic (b) Miroslav Vokalek (s) Hynek Lambl	6:24.74
Four (BM4-)	Switzerland (b) Seric Critchley (2) Donat Vonder Mühll (3) Noah von Tavel (s) Nicolas Chambers	6:06.26	Croatia (b) Dominiko Ivo Arnerich (2) Roko Bošković (3) Fran Suk (s) Marine Antony Arnerich	6:08.56	Turkey (b) Alper Şevket Eren (2) Kaan Aydin (3) Aytimur Selçuk (s) Ahmet Ali Kabadayi	6:10.78
Coxed Four (BM4+)	Romania (b) Cristian-Vasile Nicoară (2) Ionut Pavel (3) Andrei Vatamaniuc (s) Sergiu Anfimov (c) Maria-Antonia Iancu	6:23.40	Denmark (b) Elias Ellehammer (2) Lukas Obel (3) Søren Meldgaard Madsen (s) Tobias Kramer Bosnes (c) Anna Kramer Bosnes	6:25.84	Turkey (b) Berat Kopal (2) Gökmen Kaan Sezer (3) Eren Akbas (s) Yasin Sen (c) Mehmet Eralp Aktaş	6:29.94
Quadruple Sculls (BM4x)	Poland (b) Mikołaj Kulka (2) Michał Rańda (3) Cezary Litka (s) Daniel Gałęza	6:01.59	Switzerland (b) Gian Luca Egli (2) Alexander Bannwart (3) Shamall Suero Santana (s) Nicolas Berger	6:03.79	Belgium (b) Mil Blommaert (2) Dean Laureyns (3) Boris Taeldeman (s) Savin Rodenburg	6:04.19
Eight (BM8+)	Romania (b) Costi-Daniel Neagoe (2) Andrei Hemen (3) Cristian-Vasile Nicoară (4) Ionuț Pavel (5) Andrei Vatamaniuc (6) Sergiu Anfimov (7) Andrei Mandrila (s) Leontin Nutescu (c) Maria-Antonia Iancu	5:44.15	Turkey (b) Onur Sönmez (2) Bilal Sarılar (3) Eymen Ervin Kay (4) Yusuf Ziya Ateş (5) Yiğit Yaşar Doğruok (6) Enver Erman (7) Kaan Efe Aktop (s) Enes Biber (c) Selin Aboz	5:47.24	Spain (b) Iker Castiñeira (2) Aleix Rangel Sanguesa (3) Igor Teixidor Buch (4) Pau Sánchez Batlle (5) Juan Kaulani Martínez Fonseca (6) Sergi Olid Fabra (7) Joan Bel Arnau (s) Bruno Eder Blanco (c) Hugo Diaz Herrera	5:47.68

=== Women ===
Event	Gold		Silver		Bronze	
Lightweight Single Sculls (BLW1x)	Mariia Zhovner; Individual Neutral Athletes	7:49.02	Deniznur Baykara; Turkey	7:52.39	Eszter Fehérvári; Hungary	7:57.20
Lightweight Pair (BLW2-)	Turkey (b) Simla Suay Alinci (s) Irmak Fertug	7:36.52	Italy (b) Emma Tosi (s) Arianna Tosi	7:41.01	Not awarded only three entries	
Lightweight Double (BLW2x)	Greece (b) Dimitra Kontou (s) Evangelia Anastasiadou	7:02.18	Italy (b) Elena Sali (s) Alice Ramella	7:11.17	Poland (b) Maria Taczek (s) Amelia Pawlowska	7:15.55
Single Sculls (BW1x)	Aurelia-Maxima Janzen; Switzerland	7:28.56	Marina Matveeva; Individual Neutral Athletes	7:38.21	Evangelia Fragkou; Greece	7:39.00
Pair (BW2-)	Romania (b) Daria-Ioana Dinulescu (s) Georgiana Blanariu	7:24.39	Poland (b) Kinga Stalega (s) Wiktoria Lewandowska	7:34.12	Greece (b) Nefeli Ntara (s) Nikoleta Drogala	7:41.40
Double Sculls (BW2x)	Romania (b) Andrada Maria Morosanu (s) Iulia-Liliana Balauca	7:04.35	Poland (b) Julia Rogiewicz (s) Barbara Stepien	7:10.78	Greece (b) Gavriela Lioliou (s) Varvara Lykomitrou	7:14.71
Four (BW4-)	Romania (b) Beatrice Piseru (2) Denisa Cristina Alincai (3) Petruta-Ionela Popa (s) Georgelia Stoica	6:52.92	Poland (b) Dominika Gałka (2) Martyna Jankowska (3) Weronika Ludwiczak (s) Julia Hakobyan	6:54.89	Not awarded only three entries	
Coxed Four (BW4+)	Romania (b) Delia Mirabela Gradinaciuc (2) Iuliana Isabela Boldea (3) Estera Vilceanu (s) Larisa Bogdan (c) Rucsandra-Ioana Bucsa	7:16.35	Not awarded only two entries			
Quadruple Sculls (BW4x)	Romania (b) Mariana-Laura Dumitru (2) Manuela-Gabriela Lungu (3) Emanuela-Ioana Ciotau (s) Patricia Cireș	6:39.35	Poland (b) Kinga Kusiowska (2) Rozalia Linowska (3) Ana Khlibenko (s) Gabriela Stefaniak	6:41.27	Lithuania (b) Gabija Stankevičiūtė (2) Saule Kryzeviciute (3) Ugnė Juzėnaitė (s) Ugne Rudaityte	6:43.21
Eight (BW8+)	Romania (b) Daria-Ioana Dinulescu (2) Andreea Nicoleta Dinu (3) Ana-Maria Matran (4) Larisa Bogdan (5) Delia Mirabela Gradinaciuc (6) Georgiana Blănariu (7) Estera Vîlceanu (s) Elena-Diana Suta (c) Rucsandra-Ioana Bucsa	6:34.68	Not awarded only two entries			
