= Cui Xiaotong =

Chinese rower (born 1994)

Personal information
- Nationality: Chinese
- Born: November 21, 1994 (age 31) Dandong, China
- Height: 1.82 m (6 ft 0 in)
- Weight: 79 kg (174 lb)

Sport
- Country: China
- Sport: Rowing
- Event: Quadruple sculls
Medal record
Women's rowing
Representing China
Olympic Games
Gold medal – first place	2020 Tokyo	Quadruple sculls
World Championships
Gold medal – first place	2019 Ottensheim	Quadruple sculls
Gold medal – first place	2022 Račice	Quadruple sculls
Bronze medal – third place	2014 Amsterdam	Eight
Bronze medal – third place	2023 Belgrade	Quadruple sculls
Asian Games
Gold medal – first place	2022 Hangzhou	Quadruple sculls

Cui Xiaotong (Chinese: 崔晓桐; born November 21, 1994) is a Chinese rower.

She won a medal at the 2019 World Rowing Championships.

On July 28, 2021, she and three teammates won the gold medal in women's quadruple sculls at the 2020 Summer Olympics in Tokyo with 6:05.13, setting the new WB. It was the second time China won the Olympic gold medal in this event.

She also competed in the 2024 Summer Olympics in women's quadruple sculls, placing 6th with her team.
