= Tessa Dullemans =

Dutch rower (born 1997)

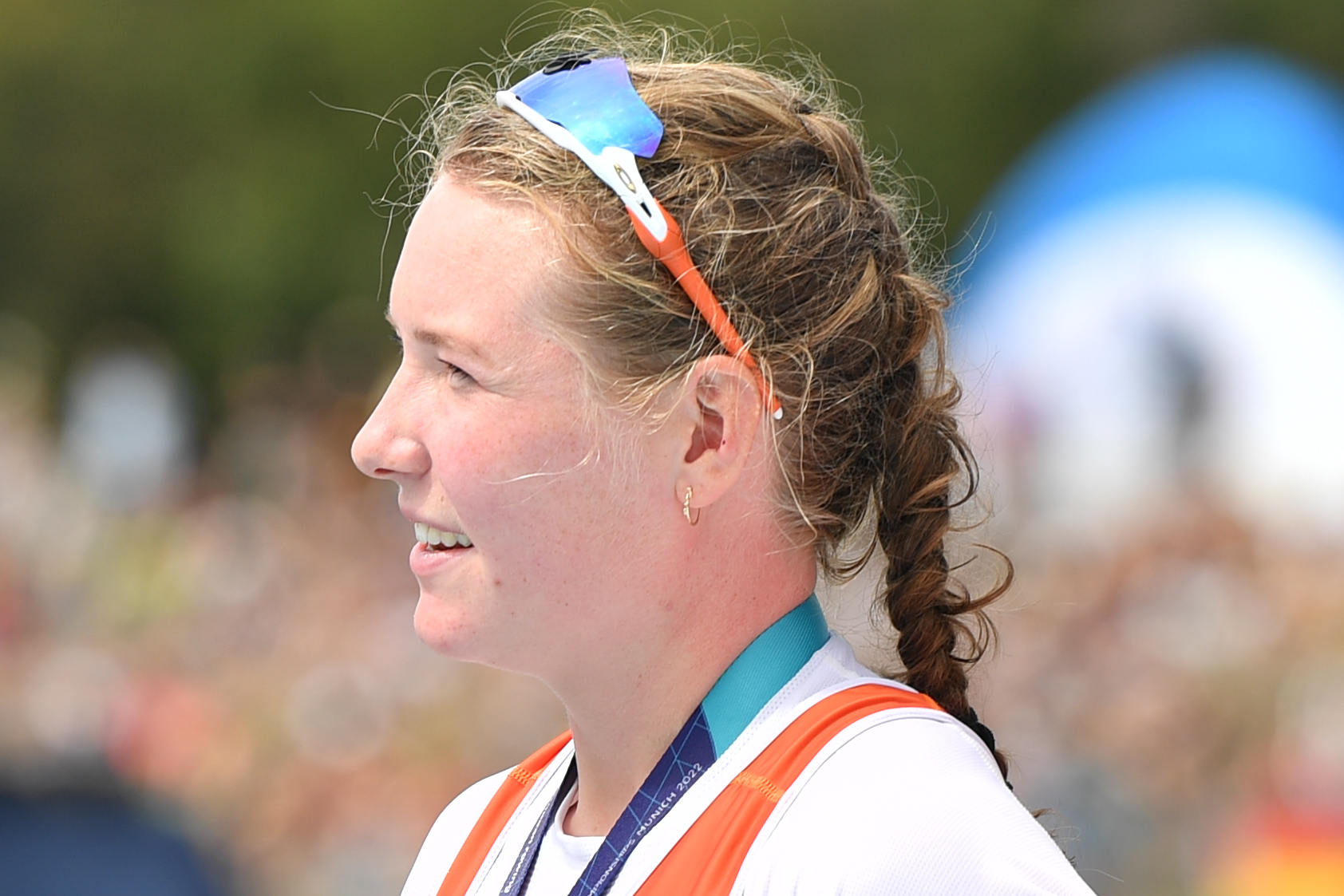
- Dullemans in 2022

Personal information
- Nationality: Dutch
- Born: 2 July 1997 (age 29) Rotterdam, Netherlands

Sport
- Sport: Rowing
Medal record
Women's rowing
Representing the Netherlands
Olympic Games
Silver medal – second place	2024 Paris	Quadruple sculls
World Championships
Gold medal – first place	2025 Shanghai	Quadruple sculls
Gold medal – first place	2026 Amsterdam	Quadruple sculls
Silver medal – second place	2023 Belgrade	Quadruple sculls
Silver medal – second place	2022 Račice	Quadruple sculls
European Championships
Gold medal – first place	2025 Plovdiv	Double sculls
Silver medal – second place	2022 Oberschleißheim	Quadruple sculls
Silver medal – second place	2023 Bled	Quadruple sculls
Bronze medal – third place	2020 Poznań	Eight

Tessa Dullemans (born 2 July 1997) is a Dutch rower. She was a silver medalist in the quadruple sculls at the 2024 Paris Olympics.

== Career ==
She won bronze in the woman's eight at the 2020 European Rowing Championships in Poznań.

At the 2022 European Rowing Championships in Munich, she won a silver medal in the women's quadruple sculls. At the 2022 World Rowing Championships held in the Czech Republic, she again won a silver medal.

The following year, Dullemans won silver in the quadruple sculls at the 2023 European Rowing Championships in Bled, Slovenia. She won silver again at the 2023 World Rowing Championships in Belgrade.

She was part of the Dutch four that placed second at the first two World Cup events of 2024. She was selected for the 2024 Paris Olympics.

She won gold in the women's double sculls alongside Roos de Jong at the 2025 European Rowing Championships in Plovdiv.
