= Tabea Schendekehl =

German rower

Personal information
- Nationality: German
- Born: 29 November 1998 (age 27) Lünen, Germany

Sport
- Sport: Rowing
Medal record
Women's rowing
Representing Germany
Olympic Games
Bronze medal – third place	2024 Paris	Quad sculls

Tabea Schendekehl (born 29 November 1998) is a German rower.

== Life ==
She competed in the women's quadruple sculls event at the 2024 Summer Olympics, where she won a bronze medal with the German team.

Schendekehl outed herself as a lesbian sportswoman.
