= Zhang Ling (rower) =

Chinese rower (born 1997)

Personal information
- Nationality: Chinese
- Born: 27 February 1997 (age 29) Shanghai, China
- Height: 1.82 m (6 ft 0 in)
- Weight: 75 kg (165 lb)

Sport
- Country: China
- Sport: Rowing
- Event: Quadruple sculls
Medal record
Women's rowing
Representing China
Olympic Games
Gold medal – first place	2020 Tokyo	Quadruple sculls
World Championships
Gold medal – first place	2019 Ottensheim	Quadruple sculls
Gold medal – first place	2022 Račice	Quadruple sculls
Silver medal – second place	2025 Shanghai	Double sculls
Bronze medal – third place	2023 Belgrade	Quadruple sculls
Asian Games
Gold medal – first place	2022 Hangzhou	Quadruple sculls

Zhang Ling (Chinese: 张灵; pinyin: Zhāng Líng; born 27 February 1997) is a Chinese rower. She competed in the women's quadruple sculls event at the 2016 Summer Olympics.

On 28 July 2021, she and three teammates won the gold medal in women's quadruple sculls at the 2020 Summer Olympics in Tokyo with 6:05.13, setting the new WB. It was the second time that China won the Olympic gold medal in the event.
