= Bente Paulis =

Dutch rower (born 1997)

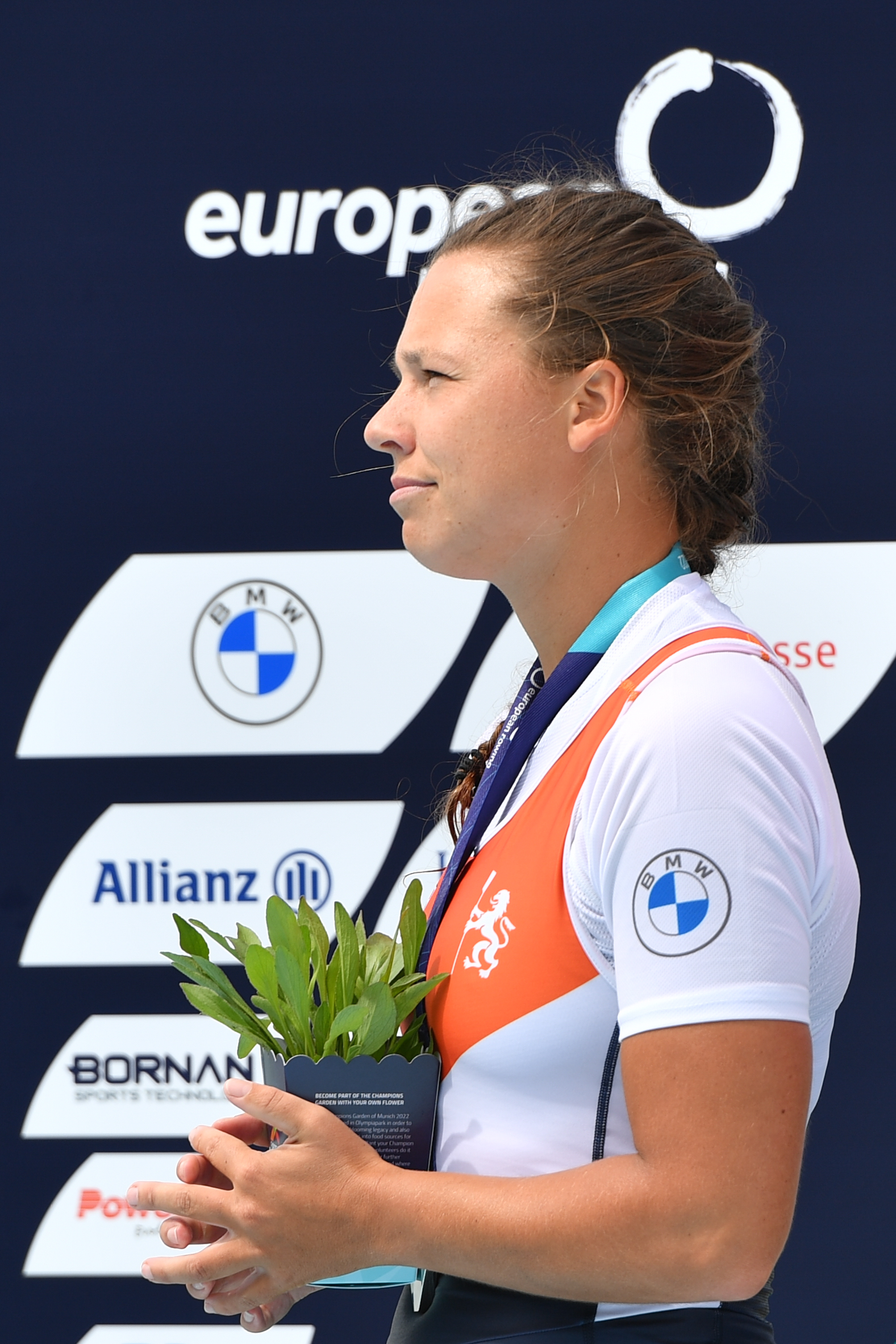

Personal information
- Nationality: Dutch
- Born: 14 February 1997 (age 29) Leiderdorp, Netherlands

Sport
- Sport: Rowing
Medal record
Women's rowing
Representing the Netherlands
Olympic Games
Silver medal – second place	2024 Paris	Quadruple sculls
World Championships
Silver medal – second place	2023 Belgrade	Quadruple sculls
Silver medal – second place	2022 Račice	Quadruple sculls
European Championships
Silver medal – second place	2022 Oberschleißheim	Quadruple sculls

Bente Paulis (born 14 February 1997) is a Dutch rower. She won a silver medal at the 2024 Summer Olympics in the quadruple sculls.

== Career ==
At the 2022 European Rowing Championships in Munich, she won a silver medal in the women's quadruple sculls. At the 2022 World Rowing Championships held in the Czech Republic, she also won a silver medal.

The following year, in 2023, Paulis also won silver in the quadruple sculls at the 2023 World Rowing Championships in Belgrade.

She was part of the Dutch four that placed second at the first two World Cup events of 2024. She was selected for the 2024 Paris Olympics.

== Personal life ==
She is the younger sister of rower and former Olympic champion Ilse Paulis. Their youngest sister Femke is also a rower and has competed in three junior world championships.
