= Pia Greiten =

German rower (born 1997)

Personal information
- Born: 18 February 1997 (age 29) Ostercappeln, Lower Saxony, Germany
Medal record
Women's rowing
Representing Germany
Olympic Games
Bronze medal – third place	2024 Paris	Quadruple sculls
World Championships
Bronze medal – third place	2025 Shanghai	Quadruple sculls
European Championships
Silver medal – second place	2025 Plovdiv	Quadruple sculls
Silver medal – second place	2026 Varese	Coxless four
Bronze medal – third place	2024 Szeged	Quadruple sculls

Pia Greiten (born 18 February 1997) is a German rower. She competed in the women's quadruple sculls event at the 2024 Summer Olympics, where she won a bronze medal with the German team.

== Career ==
She won bronze at the 2024 European Rowing Championships in the women's quadruple sculls in Szeged.

She was selected for her Olympic debut to compete at the 2024 Summer Olympics in Paris in the women's quadruple sculls. Her German boat proceeded through the preliminary heats and won bronze in the final on 31 July 2024.

== Personal life ==
She is from Ostercappeln in Lower Saxony. She studied engineering at the University of Bochum.
