= Chen Yunxia =

Chinese rower (born 1995)

Personal information
- Nationality: Chinese
- Born: 5 December 1995 (age 30) Tongliao, China

Sport
- Country: China
- Sport: Rowing
- Event: Quadruple sculls
Medal record
Women's rowing
Representing China
Olympic Games
Gold medal – first place	2020 Tokyo	Quadruple sculls
World Championships
Gold medal – first place	2019 Ottensheim	Quadruple sculls
Gold medal – first place	2022 Račice	Quadruple sculls
Silver medal – second place	2025 Shanghai	Double sculls
Bronze medal – third place	2023 Belgrade	Quadruple sculls
Asian Games
Gold medal – first place	2018 Jakarta–Palembang	Single sculls
Gold medal – first place	2022 Hangzhou	Quadruple sculls

Chen Yunxia (simplified Chinese: 陈云霞; traditional Chinese: 陳雲霞; pinyin: Chén Yúnxiá; born 5 December 1995) is a Chinese rower.

She won a medal at the 2019 World Rowing Championships.

On 28 July 2021, she and three teammates won the gold medal in women's quadruple sculls at the 2020 Summer Olympics in Tokyo with 6:05.13, setting the new WB. It is the second time China won the Olympic gold medal in this event.
