= Laila Youssifou =

Dutch rower (born 1996)

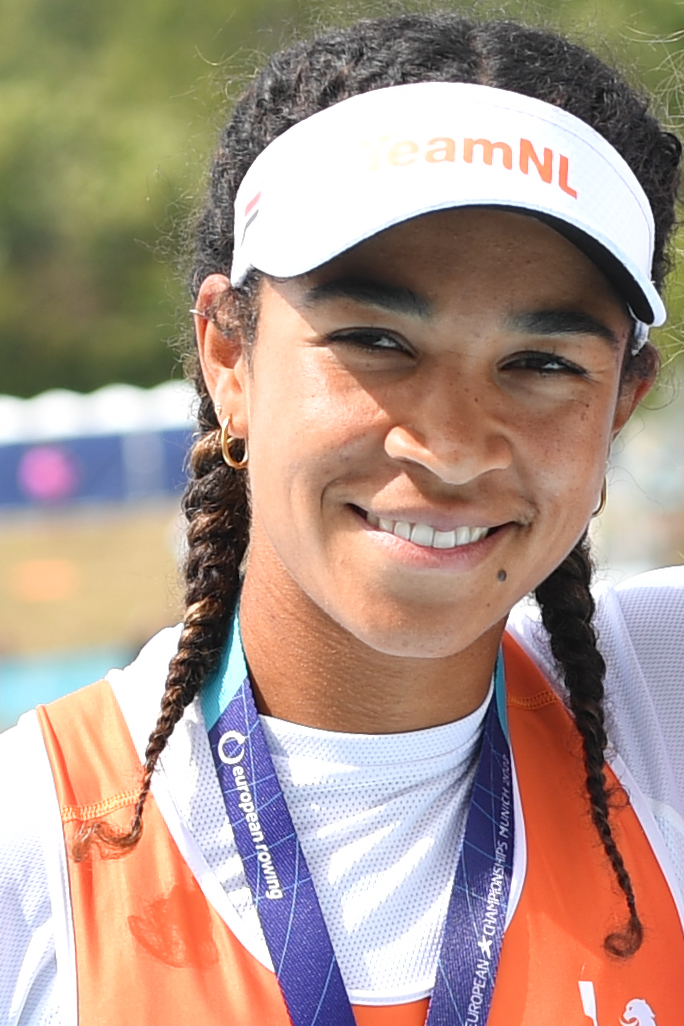
- Youssifou in 2022

Personal information
- Nationality: Dutch
- Born: 2 January 1996 (age 30) Amsterdam, Netherlands

Sport
- Sport: Rowing

Achievements and titles
- Olympic finals: Tokyo 2020 W4X
Medal record
Women's rowing
Representing the Netherlands
Olympic Games
Silver medal – second place	2024 Paris	Quadruple sculls
World Championships
Silver medal – second place	2022 Račice	Double sculls
Silver medal – second place	2022 Račice	Eight
Silver medal – second place	2023 Belgrade	Quadruple sculls
European Championships
Gold medal – first place	2020 Poznań	Quadruple sculls
Gold medal – first place	2021 Varese	Quadruple sculls
Silver medal – second place	2018 Glasgow	Coxless pair
Silver medal – second place	2022 Munich	Double sculls
Bronze medal – third place	2022 Munich	Eight
Bronze medal – third place	2023 Bled	Double sculls

Laila Youssifou (born 2 January 1996) is a Dutch rower and Olympic silver medallist in the women's quadruple sculls event at the 2024 Olympics. She also competed in the same event at the 2020 Olympics.

== Personal life ==
Youssifou was born in the Netherlands to a Ghanaian father and Dutch mother. She studies Engineering and Policy Analysis at the Delft University of Technology.
