= Lisa Lötscher =

Swiss rower (born 2000)

Personal information
- Born: 11 July 2000 (age 26)
- Height: 1.80 m (5 ft 11 in)
- Weight: 70 kg (154 lb)

Sport
- Country: Switzerland
- Sport: Rowing
Medal record
Women's rowing
Representing Switzerland
European Championships
Gold medal – first place	2026 Varese	W4x

Lisa Lötscher (born 11 July 2000) is a Swiss rower. She represented Switzerland at the 2024 Summer Olympics.

== Career ==
Loetscher represented Switzerland at the 2024 Summer Olympics and finished in fourth place in the women's quadruple sculls event, missing the bronze medal by 0.42 seconds.

She competed at the 2026 European Rowing Championships and won a gold medal in the women's quadruple sculls. This marked Switzerland's first ever women's medal in a large boat at the European Rowing Championships.

== Personal life ==
Lötscher's younger sister, Flavia, is also a rower.
