= Alessandra Montesano =

Italian rower

Personal information
- Nationality: Italian
- Born: 13 June 1998 (age 26); Casalmaggiore, Italy

Sport
- Sport: Rowing

Achievements and titles
- Olympic finals: Tokyo 2020 W4X

Alessandra Montesano (born 13 June 1998) is an Italian rower. She competed in the women's quadruple sculls event at the 2020 Summer Olympics.
