= Emily Kallfelz =

American rower (born 1997)

Personal information
- Nationality: American
- Born: 5 April 1997 (age 29)

Sport
- Country: United States
- Sport: Rowing
Medal record
World Championships
Bronze medal – third place	2026 Amsterdam	Quadruple sculls

Emily Kallfelz (/ˈkɑːlfɛlz/ KAHL-felz; born 5 April 1997) is an American rower. She represented the United States at the 2024 Summer Olympics.
