= Patricia Cireș =

Romanian rower (born 2002)

Personal information
- Born: 11 June 2002 (age 24) Romania

Sport
- Sport: Rowing
Medal record
Women's rowing
Representing Romania
World U23 Championships
Gold medal – first place	2024 St. Catharines	W4x
Silver medal – second place	2022 Varese	W4x
European U23 Championships
Gold medal – first place	2024 Edirne	W4x
World Junior Championships
Bronze medal – third place	2019 Tokyo	JW4+

Patricia Cireș (born 11 June 2002) is a Romanian rower. She won a silver medal in the coxless four at the World U23 Championships in 2022 and a bronze medal in the quadruple sculls at the World Junior Championships in 2019. She will compete in the 2024 Summer Olympics.
