= Kateryna Dudchenko =

Ukrainian rower (born 1996)

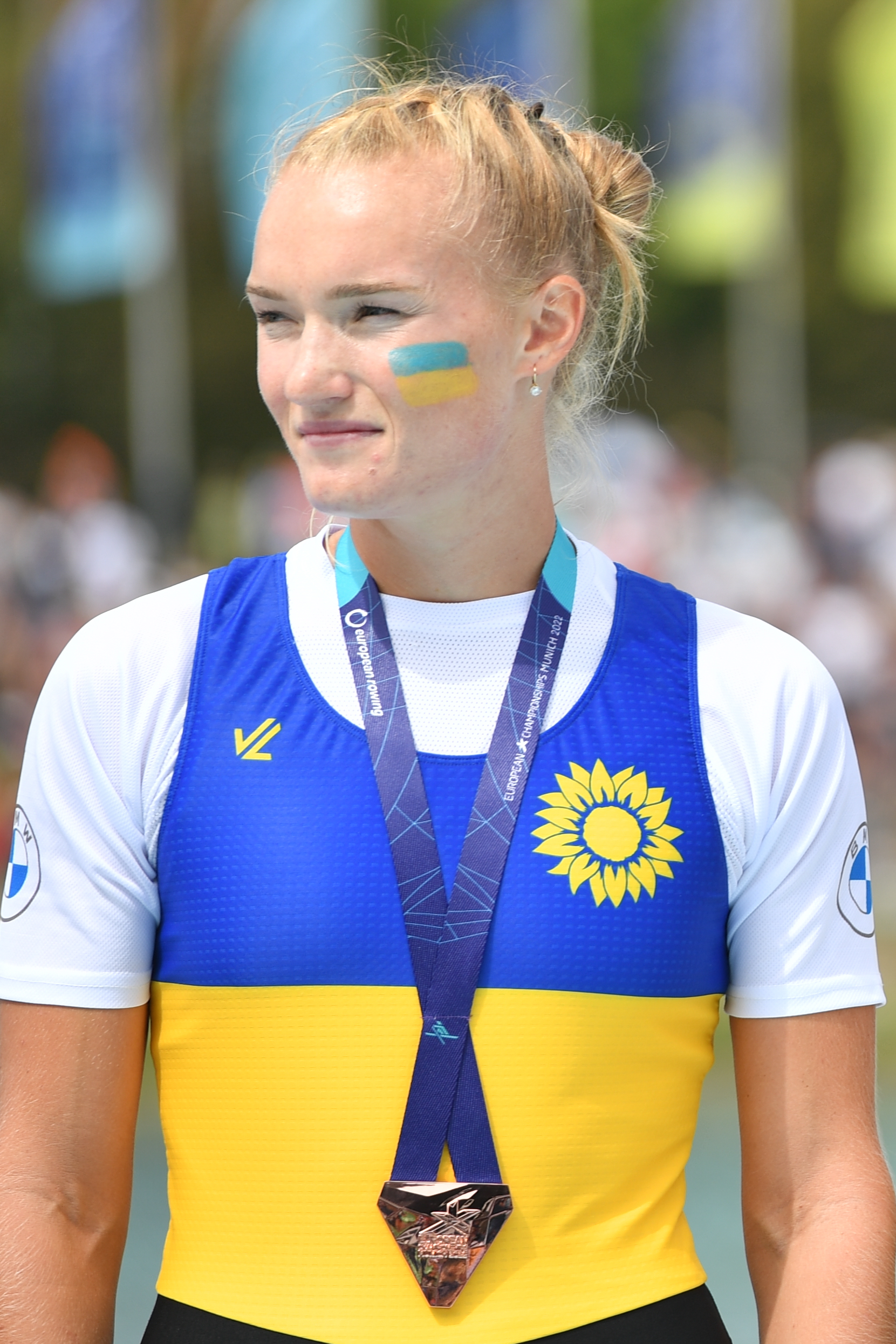
- Dudchenko at the 2022 European Championships

Personal information
- Born: 14 October 1996 (age 29) Ukraine
- Height: 184 cm (6 ft 0 in)
- Weight: 79 kg (174 lb)
Medal record
Women's rowing
Representing Ukraine
European Championships
Gold medal – first place	2023 Bled	Quadruple sculls
Silver medal – second place	2024 Szeged	Quadruple sculls
Bronze medal – third place	2022 Oberschleißheim	Quadruple sculls
European U23 Championships
Silver medal – second place	2018 Brest	Single sculls

Kateryna Dudchenko (Ukrainian: Катерина Вікторівна Дудченко; born 14 October 1996 in Ukraine) is a Ukrainian rower. She won a bronze medal at the 2022 European Championships where she finished third in women's quadruple sculls in team with Daryna Verkhohliad, Nataliya Dovhodko, and Yevheniya Dovhodko.
