= List of Olympic medallists for Ukraine =

This is a list of all Olympic champions of Ukraine (since Ukraine has taken part in the Games as a separate representation). As of February 24, 2014 there are 41 Olympic champions which represented Ukraine (5 at Winter Games and 36 at Summer). Athletes are sorted by number of gold medals and then by surname.

The first Olympic champion of separate Ukrainian representation was figure skater Oksana Baiul at the 1994 Winter Olympics in Lillehammer; the first of a Summer Olympic Games was wrestler Vyacheslav Oleynyk at the 1996 Games in Atlanta. The first Ukraine-born gold medal winner was Bobbie Rosenfeld (a Canadian athlete) at the 1928 Summer Olympics in Amsterdam. Data as of end of 2016 Olympics.

== Summer Olympic Games ==
=== Gold ===
Athlete	Photo	Sport	Number of gold medals	Years	Note
Yana Klochkova (Яна Клочкова)	Yana Klochkova	Swimming	4	2000 (2), 2004 (2)	
Vasyl Lomachenko (Василь Ломаченко)	Vasyl Lomachenko	Boxing	2	2008, 2012	
Lilia Podkopayeva (Лілія Подкопаєва)	Lilia Podkopayeva	Artistic gymnastics	2	1996	
Artur Ayvazyan (Артур Айвазян)		Shooting	1	2008	
Yevhen Braslavets (Євген Браславець)		Sailing	1	1996	Team effort with Ihor Matviyenko
Yuri Cheban (Юрій Чебан)	Yuri Cheban	Canoe racing	2	2012, 2016	
Yana Dementyeva (Яна Дементьєва)	Yana Dementyeva	Rowing	1	2012	Team effort
Natalya Dobrynska (Наталя Добринська)	Nataliya Dobrynska	Athletics	1	2008	
Nataliya Dovgodko (Наталія Довгодько)	Nataliya Dovgodko	Rowing	1	2012	Team effort
Valeriy Honcharov (Валерій Гончаров)	Valeriy Honcharov	Artistic gymnastics	1	2004	
Olga Kharlan (Ольга Харлан)	Olha Kharlan	Fencing	1	2008	Team effort
Olena Khomrova (Олена Хомрова)	Olena Khomrova	Fencing	1	2008	Team effort
Wladimir Klitschko (Володимир Кличко)	Wladimir Klitschko	Boxing	1	1996	
Olena Kostevych (Олена Костевич)	Olena Kostevych	Shooting	1	2004	
Anastasiya Kozhenkova (Анастасія Коженкова)	Anastasiya Kozhenkova	Rowing	1	2012	Team effort
Inesa Kravets (Інеса Кравець)		Athletics	1	1996	
Ihor Matviyenko (Ігор Матвієнко)		Sailing	1	1996	Team effort with Yevhen Braslavets
Iryna Merleni (Ірина Мерлені)	Iryna Merleni	Wrestling	1	2004	
Mykola Milchev (Микола Мільчев)	Milchev at the center	Shooting	1	2000	
Yuriy Nikitin (Юрій Нікітін)	Yuri Nikitin	Trampoline	1	2004	
Vyacheslav Oleynyk (В'ячеслав Олійник)		Wrestling	1	1996	
Inna Osypenko-Radomska (Інна Осипенко-Радомська)	Inna Osypenko-Radomska	Canoe racing	1	2008	
Oleksandr Petriv (Олександр Петрів)		Shooting	1	2008	
Halyna Pundyk (Галина Пундик)	Halyna Pundyk	Fencing	1	2008	Team effort
Viktor Ruban (Віктор Рубан)	Viktor Ruban	Archery	1	2008	
Ekaterina Serebryanskaya (Катерина Серебрянська)	Ekaterina Serebryanskaya	Rhythmic gymnastics	1	1996	
Rustam Sharipov (Рустам Шаріпов)	Rustam Sharipov	Artistic gymnastics	1	1996	Also an Olympic champion in 1992 as member of the Unified Team
Yana Shemyakina (Яна Шемякіна)	Yana Shemyakina	Fencing	1	2012	
Nataliya Skakun (Наталія Скакун)		Weightlifting	1	2004	
Kateryna Tarasenko (Катерина Тарасенко)	Kateryna Tarasenko	Rowing	1	2012	Team effort
Timur Taymazov (Тимур Таймазов)		Weightlifting	1	1996	
Elbrus Tedeyev (Ельбрус Тедеєв)	Elbrus Tedeyev	Wrestling	1	2004	
Oleksiy Torokhtiy (Олексій Торохтій)	Oleksiy Torokhtiy	Weightlifting	1	2012	
Oleksandr Usyk (Олександр Усик)	Oleksandr Usyk	Boxing	1	2012	
Olha Zhovnir (Ольга Жовнір)	Olha Zhovnir	Fencing	1	2008	Team effort
Zhan Beleniuk (Жан Беленюк)	Zhan Beleniuk	Greco-Roman wrestling	1	2020	

=== Silver ===
Athlete	Photo	Sport	Number of silver medals	Years	Note
Yana Klochkova (Яна Клочкова)	Yana Klochkova	Swimming	1	2000	
Olga Kharlan (Ольга Харлан)	Olha Kharlan	Fencing	1	2016	Team effort
Lilia Podkopayeva (Лілія Подкопаєва)	Lilia Podkopayeva	Artistic gymnastics	1	1996	
Inna Osypenko-Radomska (Інна Осипенко-Радомська)	Inna Osypenko-Radomska	Canoe racing	2	2012 (2)	
Zhan Beleniuk (Жан Беленюк)	Zhan Beleniuk	Greco-Roman wrestling	1	2016	
Valeriy Honcharov (Валерій Гончаров)	Valeriy Honcharov	Artistic gymnastics	1	2000	

== Winter Olympic Games ==
Athlete	Photo	Sport	Number of gold medals	Years	Note
Oksana Baiul (Оксана Баюл)	Oksana Baiul	Figure skating	1	1994	The first Olympic champion of independent Ukraine
Juliya Dzhyma (Юлія Джима)	Oksana Baiul	Biathlon	1	2014	Team effort.
Olena Pidhrushna (Олена Підгрушна)	Olena Pidhrushna	Biathlon	1	2014	Team effort.
Valentyna Semerenko (Валентина Семеренко)	Valentyna Semerenko	Biathlon	1	2014	Team effort.
Vita Semerenko (Віта Семеренко)	Vita Semerenko	Biathlon	1	2014	Team effort.
