= New Zealand at the 2012 Summer Olympics =

- IOC code: NZL
- NOC: New Zealand Olympic Committee
- Website: www.olympic.org.nz

in London
- Competitors: 184 in 16 sports
- Flag bearers: Nick Willis (opening); Mahé Drysdale (closing)
- Medals Ranked 15th: Gold 6 Silver 2 Bronze 5 Total 13

Summer Olympics appearances (overview)
- 1908; 1912; 1920; 1924; 1928; 1932; 1936; 1948; 1952; 1956; 1960; 1964; 1968; 1972; 1976; 1980; 1984; 1988; 1992; 1996; 2000; 2004; 2008; 2012; 2016; 2020; 2024; 2028

Other related appearances
- Australasia (1908–1912)

New Zealand competed at the 2012 Summer Olympics in London, from 27 July to 12 August 2012. This was the nation's twenty-fourth appearance at the Olympics. The New Zealand Olympic Committee sent 184 athletes, 97 men, and 87 women to the Games to compete in 16 sports, the nation's largest ever delegation.

New Zealand left London with a total of thirteen medals (six gold, two silver, and five bronze), finishing fifteenth in the overall medal standings. This was considered one of the nation's most successful Olympics, winning the second-largest number of gold medals behind eight at the 1984 Summer Olympics, and tying with the 1988 Summer Olympics for the largest number of medals. Five of these medals were awarded to the team in rowing, three in cycling, two in sailing, and one each in athletics, canoeing, and equestrian. Among the nation's medallists were rower Mahé Drysdale, who won gold in the men's single sculls, and track cyclists Sam Bewley, Marc Ryan, and Jesse Sergent, who managed to repeat the bronze from Beijing in men's team pursuit. New Zealand also ranked highly in medal tables adjusted for country populations, placing fourth for total medals per capita, gold medals per capita and weighted medals per capita.

During the Games, New Zealand achieved its one hundredth overall Olympic medal. The gold medal was won by kayaker Lisa Carrington in the women's K-1 200 metres. However, if the three medals won by New Zealand athletes in 1908 and in 1912 as part of Australasia were included, the one hundredth medal would be the silver claimed by sailors Peter Burling and Blair Tuke from the open skiff class.

Originally, New Zealand won five gold medals: three in rowing, one in sailing, and the last canoeing. On 13 August 2012, however, the International Olympic Committee stripped Belarusian shot putter Nadzeya Ostapchuk of her gold medal after testing positive for anabolic steroid metenolone. On 19 September 2012, silver medallist Valerie Adams was subsequently awarded and received her gold medal at a public ceremony in Auckland.

== Medal tables ==
Medal	Name	Sport	Event	Date
Gold	Nathan Cohen; Joseph Sullivan	Rowing	Men's double sculls	2 August
Gold	Hamish Bond; Eric Murray	Rowing	Men's pair	3 August
Gold	Mahé Drysdale	Rowing	Men's single sculls	3 August
Gold	Valerie Adams	Athletics	Women's shot put	6 August
Gold	Jo Aleh; Polly Powrie	Sailing	Women's 470 class	10 August
Gold	Lisa Carrington	Canoeing	Women's K-1 200 m	11 August
Silver	Peter Burling; Blair Tuke	Sailing	49er class	8 August
Silver	Sarah Walker	Cycling	Women's BMX	10 August
Bronze	Andrew Nicholson; Jonathan Paget; Caroline Powell; Jonelle Richards; Mark Todd	Equestrian	Team eventing	31 July
Bronze	Juliette Haigh; Rebecca Scown	Rowing	Women's pair	1 August
Bronze	Sam Bewley; Aaron Gate; Westley Gough; Marc Ryan; Jesse Sergent	Cycling	Men's team pursuit	3 August
Bronze	Peter Taylor; Storm Uru	Rowing	Men's lightweight double sculls	4 August
Bronze	Simon van Velthooven	Cycling	Men's keirin	7 August

Medals by sport
Sport	1st place, gold medalist(s)	2nd place, silver medalist(s)	3rd place, bronze medalist(s)	Total
Rowing	3	0	2	5
Sailing	1	1	0	2
Athletics	1	0	0	1
Canoeing	1	0	0	1
Cycling	0	1	2	3
Equestrian	0	0	1	1
Total	6	2	5	13

Medals by date
Sport	1st place, gold medalist(s)	2nd place, silver medalist(s)	3rd place, bronze medalist(s)	Total
28 July	0	0	0	0
29 July	0	0	0	0
30 July	0	0	0	0
31 July	0	0	1	1
1 August	0	0	1	1
2 August	1	0	0	1
3 August	2	0	1	3
4 August	0	0	1	1
5 August	0	0	0	0
6 August	1	0	0	1
7 August	0	0	1	1
8 August	0	1	0	1
9 August	0	0	0	0
10 August	1	1	0	2
11 August	1	0	0	1
12 August	0	0	0	0
Total	6	2	5	13

Medals by gender
Gender	Gold medal	Silver medal	Bronze medal	Total
Male	3	1	3.6	7.6
Female	3	1	1.4	5.4
Total	6	2	5	13

== Delegation ==
The New Zealand Olympic Committee selected a team of 184 athletes, 97 men and 87 women, to compete in sixteen sports. It was the nation's largest delegation sent to the Olympics, surpassing the 182 athletes at the 2008 Summer Olympics in Beijing. Field hockey and football were the only team-based sports in which New Zealand had representatives at the Games. For the first time in Olympic history, New Zealand did not qualify teams in basketball since its official debut in 2000. There was only a single competitor in judo, shooting, tennis, and weightlifting.

The New Zealand team featured past Olympic medallists, including the defending champion Valerie Adams in the women's shot put event. Equestrian eventing rider Mark Todd, at age 56, the oldest member of the team, became the first New Zealand athlete to compete in eight Olympic games. Todd's compatriot Andrew Nicholson was at his seventh appearance, having participated in the Olympics since 1984 (except the 2000 Summer Olympics in Sydney, where he was not selected). Meanwhile, football player Cameron Howieson, at age 17, was the youngest member of the team. Other notable New Zealand athletes featured rower and five-time world champion Mahé Drysdale in men's singles sculls, triathlete and double Olympic medallist Bevan Docherty, BMX rider Sarah Walker, who missed out of the medal standings in Beijing, and sailors Hamish Pepper and Peter Burling. Middle-distance runner Nick Willis, who won New Zealand's first Olympic track medal in Beijing since 1976, was the nation's flag bearer at the opening ceremony.

Originally, New Zealand officiated a total of 185 athletes to compete at the Olympics. On 20 July, middle-distance runner Adrian Blincoe, however, withdrew from the games because of an ankle injury.

The following is the list of number of competitors participating in the Games. Note that reserves in fencing, field hockey, football, and handball are not counted as athletes:

Sport	Men	Women	Total
Athletics	4	4	8
Boxing	0	2	2
Canoeing	4	4	8
Cycling	13	9	22
Equestrian	3	3	6
Field hockey	16	16	32
Football	18	18	36
Judo	0	1	1
Rowing	15	11	26
Sailing	9	6	15
Shooting	1	0	1
Swimming	8	8	16
Taekwondo	2	1	3
Tennis	0	1	1
Triathlon	3	3	6
Weightlifting	1	0	1
Total	97	87	184

== Athletics ==
Men
Track & road events

Athlete	Event	Heat		Semifinal		Final	
Athlete	Event	Result	Rank	Result	Rank	Result	Rank
Quentin Rew	50 km walk	—N/a				3:55:03	30
Nick Willis	1500 m	3:40.92	1 Q	3:34.70	3 Q	3:36.94	9

Field events

Athlete	Event	Qualification		Final	
Athlete	Event	Distance	Position	Distance	Position
Stuart Farquhar	Javelin throw	82.32	3 Q	80.22	9

Combined events – Decathlon

Athlete	Event	100 m	LJ	SP	HJ	400 m	110H	DT	PV	JT	1500 m	Final	Rank
Brent Newdick	Result	11.10	7.36	15.09	1.96	50.22	15.02	46.15	4.70	59.82	4:38.20	7988	12
Brent Newdick	Points	838	900	795	767	804	847	791	819	735	692	7988	12

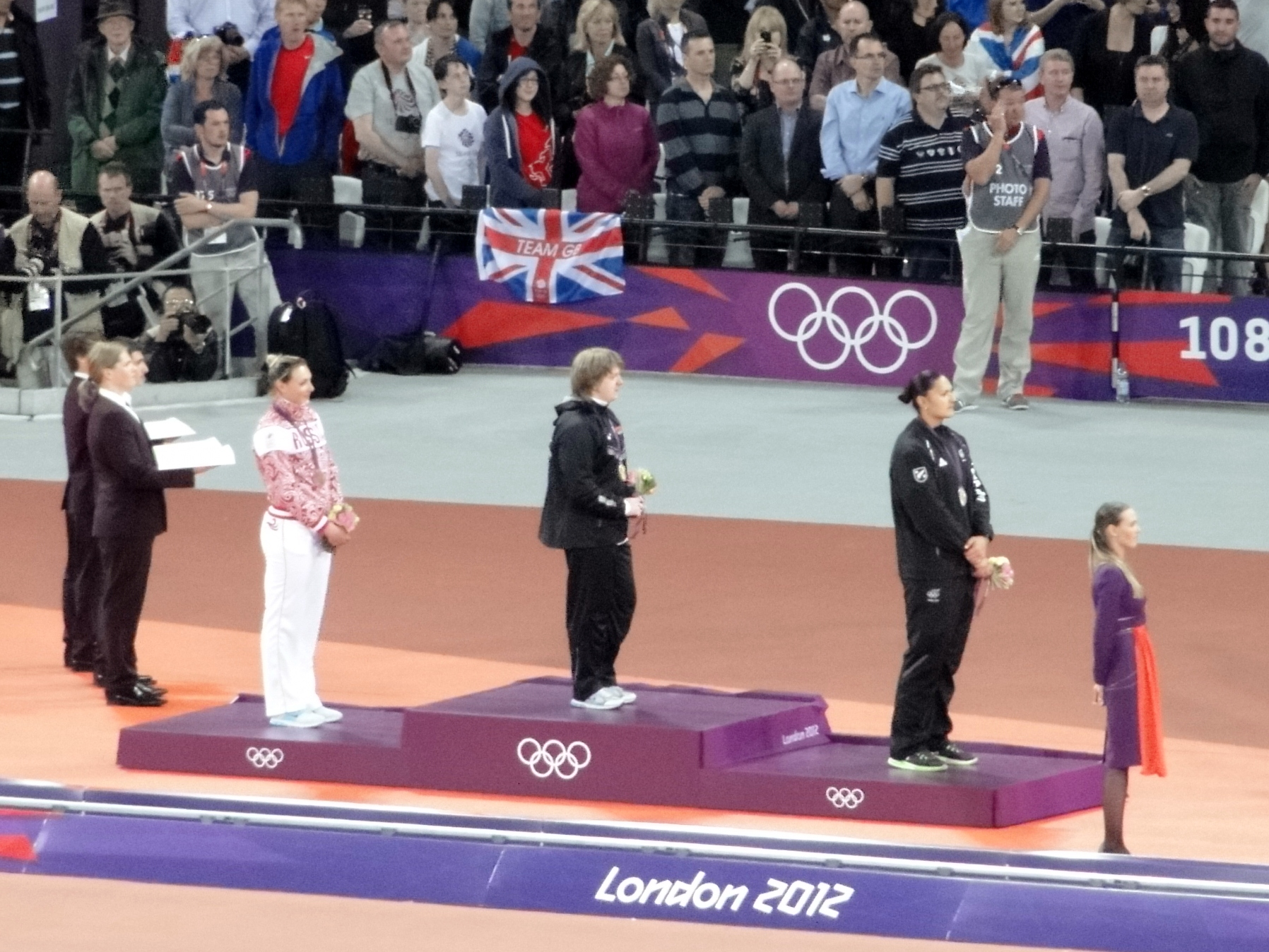
Shot put medal ceremony (l-r) Yevgeniya Kolodko, Nadzeya Ostapchuk, Valerie Adams

Women
Track & road events

Athlete	Event	Heat		Semifinal		Final	
Athlete	Event	Result	Rank	Result	Rank	Result	Rank
Lucy van Dalen	1500 m	4:07.04	8 q	4:06.97	11	Did not advance	
Kim Smith	Marathon	—N/a				2:26:59	15

Field events

Athlete	Event	Qualification		Final	
Athlete	Event	Distance	Position	Distance	Position
Valerie Adams	Shot put	20.40	1 Q	20.70	1st place, gold medalist(s)

Combined events – Heptathlon

Athlete	Event	100H	HJ	SP	200 m	LJ	JT	800 m	Final	Rank
Sarah Cowley	Result	13.95	1.80	12.37	25.60	6.00	41.90	2:19.01	5873	26
Sarah Cowley	Points	985	978	686	833	850	704	837	5873	26

Key

- Note–Ranks given for track events are within the athlete's heat only
- Q = Qualified for the next round
- q = Qualified for the next round as a fastest loser or, in field events, by position without achieving the qualifying target
- NR = National record
- N/A = Round not applicable for the event
- Bye = Athlete not required to compete in round

== Boxing ==
Women

Athlete	Event	Round of 16	Quarterfinals	Semifinals	Final	
Athlete	Event	Opposition Result	Opposition Result	Opposition Result	Opposition Result	Rank
Siona Fernandes	Flyweight	Petrova (BUL); L 11–23	Did not advance			
Alexis Pritchard	Lightweight	Jouini (TUN); W 15–10	Ochigava (RUS); L 4–22	Did not advance		

== Canoeing ==
=== Slalom ===
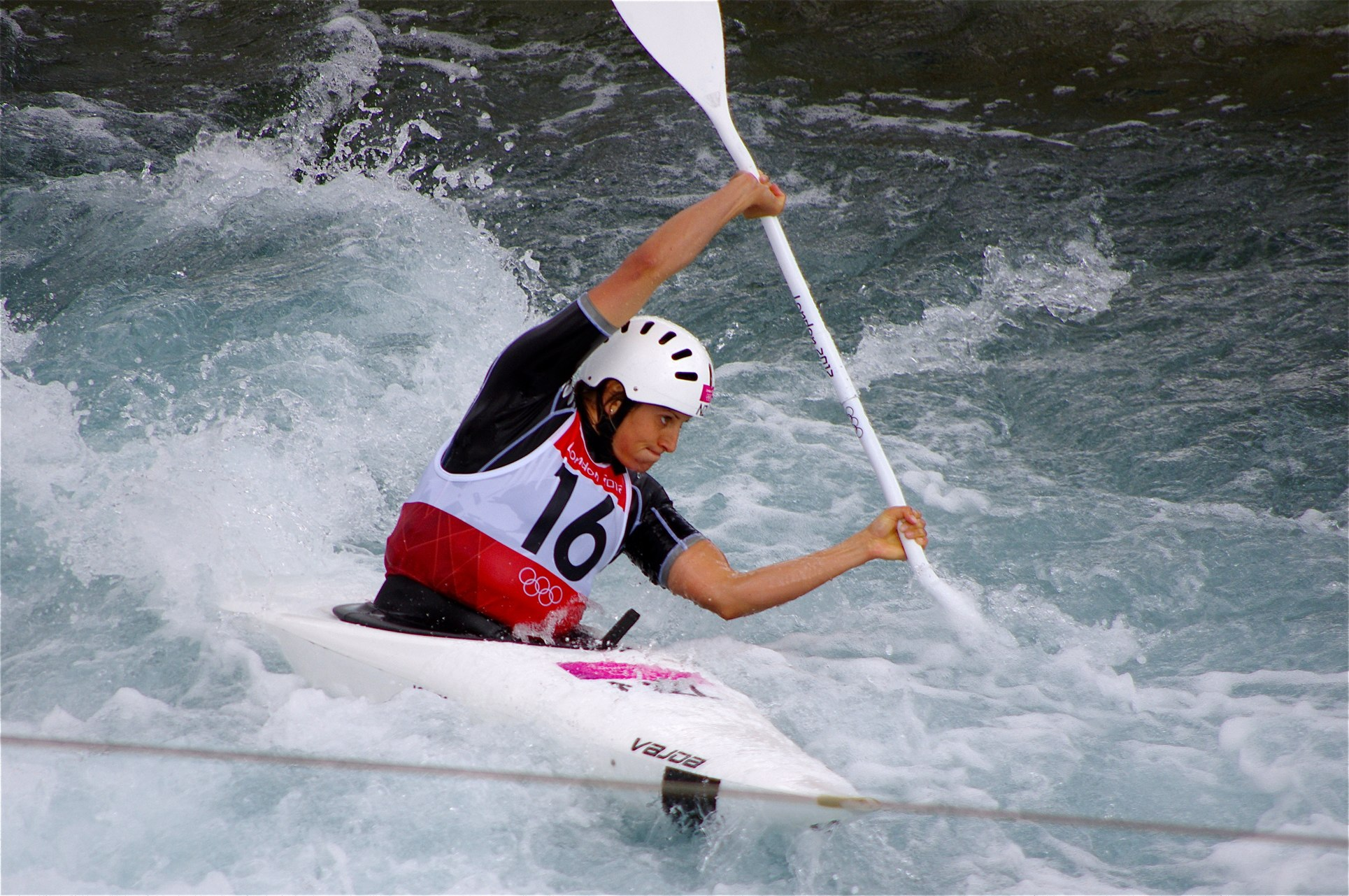
Luuka Jones

New Zealand has qualified boats for the following events

Athlete	Event	Preliminary						Semifinal		Final	
Athlete	Event	Run 1	Rank	Run 2	Rank	Best	Rank	Time	Rank	Time	Rank
Michael Dawson	Men's K-1	90.12	8	88.58	6	88.58	8 Q	207.63	15	Did not advance	
Luuka Jones	Women's K-1	109.23	10	258.69	20	109.23	15 Q	121.41	14	Did not advance	

=== Sprint ===
Men

Athlete	Event	Heats		Semifinals		Finals	
Athlete	Event	Time	Rank	Time	Rank	Time	Rank
Ben Fouhy	K-1 1000 m	3:35.610	2 Q	3:32.572	6 FB	3:34.710	14
Steven Ferguson; Darryl Fitzgerald	K-2 1000 m	3:16.608	4 Q	3:15.307	3 FA	3:12.117	7

Women

Athlete	Event	Heats		Semifinals		Finals	
Athlete	Event	Time	Rank	Time	Rank	Time	Rank
Lisa Carrington	K-1 200 m	41.401	2 Q	40.528 OB	1 FA	44.638	1st place, gold medalist(s)
Teneale Hatton	K-1 500 m	1:56.741	6 Q	1:54.504	5 FB	1:56.103	15
Lisa Carrington; Erin Taylor	K-2 500 m	1:44.870	3 Q	1:42.764	4 FA	1:46.290	7

Qualification Legend: FA=Final A; FB=Final B; OB=Olympic best

== Cycling ==
=== Road ===
Athlete	Event	Time	Rank
Jack Bauer	Men's road race	5:46:05	10
Jack Bauer	Men's time trial	54:54.16	19
Greg Henderson	Men's road race	Did not finish	
Linda Villumsen	Women's road race	3:35:56	18
Linda Villumsen	Women's time trial	37:59.18	4

=== Track ===
Sprint

Athlete	Event	Qualification		Round 1	Repechage 1	Round 2	Repechage 2	Quarterfinals	Semifinals	Final	
Athlete	Event	Time Speed (km/h)	Rank	Opposition Time Speed (km/h)	Opposition Time Speed (km/h)	Opposition Time Speed (km/h)	Opposition Time Speed (km/h)	Opposition Time Speed (km/h)	Opposition Time Speed (km/h)	Opposition Time Speed (km/h)	Rank
Eddie Dawkins	Men's sprint	10.201; 70.581	9	Phillip (TRI); L	Canelón (VEN); L	Did not advance					
Natasha Hansen	Women's sprint	11.241; 64.051	9	Shulika (UKR); L	Gaviria (COL); Gnidenko (RUS); W 11.882; 60.595	Guo S (CHN); L	Panarina (BLR); Sullivan (CAN); W 11.443; 62.920	Did not advance		9th place final Kanis (NED); Lee W S (HKG); Sullivan (CAN); L	12

Team sprint

Athlete	Event	Qualification		Semifinals		Final	
Athlete	Event	Time Speed (km/h)	Rank	Opposition Time Speed (km/h)	Rank	Opposition Time Speed (km/h)	Rank
Eddie Dawkins; Ethan Mitchell; Simon van Velthooven	Men's team sprint	44.175; 61.120	7 Q	France; L 43.495; 62.076	5	Did not advance	

Pursuit

Athlete	Event	Qualification		Semifinals		Final	
Athlete	Event	Time	Rank	Opponent Results	Rank	Opponent Results	Rank
Sam Bewley; Aaron Gate; Westley Gough; Marc Ryan; Jesse Sergent	Men's team pursuit	3:57.607	3 Q	Australia; 3:56.442	3	Russia; 3:55.952	3rd place, bronze medalist(s)
Rushlee Buchanan; Lauren Ellis; Jaime Nielsen; Alison Shanks	Women's team pursuit	3:20.421	5 Q	Belarus; 3:18.514	5	Netherlands; 3:19.351	5

Keirin

Athlete	Event	1st round	Repechage	2nd round	Final
Athlete	Event	Rank	Rank	Rank	Rank
Simon van Velthooven	Men's keirin	2 Q	Bye	2 Q	3rd place, bronze medalist(s)
Natasha Hansen	Women's keirin	3 R	2 Q	5	11

R=Repechage

Omnium

Athlete	Event	Flying lap		Points race		Elimination race	Individual pursuit		Scratch race	Time trial		Total points	Rank
Athlete	Event	Time	Rank	Points	Rank	Rank	Time	Rank	Rank	Time	Rank	Total points	Rank
Shane Archbold	Men's omnium	13.112	2	3	15	6	4:26.581	6	13	1:03.290	6	48	7
Jo Kiesanowski	Women's omnium	14.924	16	22	7	7	3:44.971	11	7	36.360	7	55	7

=== Mountain biking ===
Athlete	Event	Time	Rank
Sam Bewley	Men's cross-country	DNS	
Karen Hanlen	Women's cross-country	1:37:54	18

=== BMX ===
Athlete	Event	Seeding		Quarterfinal		Semifinal		Final	
Athlete	Event	Result	Rank	Points	Rank	Points	Rank	Result	Rank
Kurt Pickard	Men's BMX	39.057	16	31	7	Did not advance			
Marc Willers	Men's BMX	38.687	10	4	1 Q	26	8	Did not advance	
Sarah Walker	Women's BMX	38.644	2	—N/a		12	4 Q	38.133	2nd place, silver medalist(s)

== Equestrian ==
=== Dressage ===
Athlete	Horse	Event	Grand Prix		Grand Prix Special		Grand Prix Freestyle		Overall	
Athlete	Horse	Event	Score	Rank	Score	Rank	Technical	Artistic	Score	Rank
Louisa Hill	Bates Antonello	Individual	65.258	48	Did not advance					

=== Eventing ===
Athlete	Horse	Event	Dressage		Cross-country			Jumping						Total	
Athlete	Horse	Event	Dressage		Cross-country			Qualifier			Final			Total	
Athlete	Horse	Event	Penalties	Rank	Penalties	Total	Rank	Penalties	Total	Rank	Penalties	Total	Rank	Penalties	Rank
Andrew Nicholson	Nereo	Individual	45.00	21	0.00	45.00	9	0.00	45.00	6 Q	4.00	49.00	4	49.00	4
Jock Paget	Clifton Promise	Individual	44.10	=17	4.80	48.90	14	4.00	52.90	13 Q	1.00	53.90	10	53.90	10
Caroline Powell	Lenamore	Individual	52.20 #	=43	1.60	53.80 #	=24	4.00	57.80 #	23	Did not advance			57.80	23
Jonelle Richards	Flintstar	Individual	56.70 #	55	6.00	62.70 #	31	9.00	71.70 #	=30	Did not advance			71.70	=30
Mark Todd	Campino	Individual	39.10	3	0.40	39.50	3	7.00	46.50	7 Q	8.00	54.50	12	54.50	12
Andrew Nicholson; Jock Paget; Caroline Powell; Jonelle Richards; Mark Todd	See above	Team	128.20	4	5.20	133.40	4	11.00	144.40	3	—N/a			144.40	3rd place, bronze medalist(s)

"#" indicates that the score of this rider does not count in the team competition, since only the best three results of a team are counted.

== Field hockey ==
As per regulations, each team was made up of 16 players, plus an additional two reserves travelling with the team but not participating.

=== Men's tournament ===
Roster

The following is the New Zealand roster in the men's field hockey tournament of the 2012 Summer Olympics.

Head Coach: Shane McLeod

4. Nicholas Haig
5. Andy Hayward
6. Simon Child
7. Blair Hopping
8. Dean Couzins (C)
9. Blair Hilton
10. Ryan Archibald
12. Bradley Shaw
17. Kyle Pontifex (GK)
18. Phil Burrows
25. Shea McAleese
27. Stephen Jenness
28. Richard Petherick
29. Hugo Inglis
31. Steve Edwards
32. Nick Wilson

Reserves:

- Hamish McGregor (GK)
- Arun Panchia

Group play

Pos	Team	Pld	W	D	L	GF	GA	GD	Pts	Qualification
1	Netherlands	5	5	0	0	18	7	+11	15	Semi-finals
2	Germany	5	3	1	1	14	11	+3	10	Semi-finals
3	Belgium	5	2	1	2	8	7	+1	7	Fifth place game
4	South Korea	5	2	0	3	9	8	+1	6	Seventh place game
5	New Zealand	5	1	2	2	10	14	−4	5	Ninth place game
6	India	5	0	0	5	6	18	−12	0	Eleventh place game

Source: FIH

30 July 2012
08:30

South Korea	2–0	New Zealand
You 20', 34'	Report

Umpires:
Hamish Jamson (GBR)
German Montes de Oca (ARG)

1 August 2012
13:45

New Zealand	3–1	India
Hayward 13'; Burrows 24'; Wilson 29'	Report	San. Singh 2'

Umpires:
Ged Curran (GBR)
Colin Hutchinson (IRL)

3 August 2012
10:45

Netherlands	5–1	New Zealand
Weusthof 16'; Van der Weerden 27'; Bakker 29', 56'; Kemperman 67'	Report	Child 5'

Umpires:
Ged Curran (GBR)
Nathan Stagno (GIB)

5 August 2012
08:30

New Zealand	1–1	Belgium
Wilson 54'	Report	Boon 48'

Umpires:
German Montes de Oca (ARG)
Roel van Eert (NED)

7 August 2012
21:15

Germany	5–5	New Zealand
Deecke 10'; Fuchs 27'; Stralkowski 47'; Zeller 51', 69'	Report	Wilson 4'; Petherick 6'; Jenness 21'; Child 30', 36'

Umpires:
David Gentles (AUS)
Hamish Jamson (GBR)

9th/10th place game

9 August 2012
08:30

Argentina	1–3	New Zealand
Ibarra 59'	Report	Jenness 4'; Petherick 21'; Wilson 29'

Umpires:
Marcin Grochal (POL)
Tim Pullman (AUS)

=== Women's tournament ===
Roster

The following is the New Zealand roster in the women's field hockey tournament of the 2012 Summer Olympics.

Head Coach: Mark Hager

1. Kayla Sharland
2. Emily Naylor (C)
3. Krystal Forgesson
5. Katie Glynn
9. Alana Millington
12. Ella Gunson
13. Samantha Charlton
16. Clarissa Eshuis
20. Samantha Harrison
21. Cathryn Finlayson
22. Gemma Flynn
28. Charlotte Harrison
29. Melody Cooper
30. Bianca Russell (GK)
31. Stacey Michelsen
32. Anita Punt

Reserves:

- Julia King
- Sally Rutherford (GK)

Group play

Pos	Team	Pld	W	D	L	GF	GA	GD	Pts	Qualification
1	Argentina	5	3	1	1	12	4	+8	10	Semi-finals
2	New Zealand	5	3	1	1	9	5	+4	10	Semi-finals
3	Australia	5	3	1	1	5	2	+3	10	
4	Germany	5	2	1	2	6	7	−1	7	
5	South Africa	5	1	0	4	9	14	−5	3	
6	United States	5	1	0	4	4	13	−9	3	

Source: FIH
Rules for classification: 1) Points; 2) Matches won; 3) Goal difference; 4) Goals for; 5) Head-to-head result.

29 July 2012
08:30

New Zealand	1–0	Australia
Finlayson 3'	Report

Umpires:
Elena Eskina (RUS)
Carolina de la Fuente (ARG)

31 July 2012
10:45

South Africa	1–4	New Zealand
Coetzee 52'	Report	C. Harrison 2'; Eshuis 22'; Sharland 29', 61'

Umpires:
Chieko Soma (JPN)
Amy Hassick (USA)

2 August 2012
21:15

New Zealand	1–2	Argentina
C. Harrison 62'	Report	Rebecchi 3', 45'

Umpires:
Lisa Roach (AUS)
Carol Metchette (IRL)

4 August 2012
19:00

United States	2–3	New Zealand
O'Donnell 16'; Laubach 34'	Report	Sharland 3'; Flynn 19'; Eshuis 64'

Umpires:
Carolina de la Fuente (ARG)
Kang Hyun-young (KOR)

6 August 2012
08:30

New Zealand	0–0	Germany
	Report

Umpires:
Soledad Iparraguirre (ARG)
Lisa Roach (AUS)

Semi-final

8 August 2012
15:30

Netherlands	2–2 (a.e.t.)	New Zealand
Paumen 32', 53'	Report	Sharland 7'; Forgesson 49'
Penalties
Van As (penalty shoot-out scored); Paumen (penalty shoot-out missed); De Goede (penalty shoot-out scored); Van Geffen (penalty shoot-out missed); Hoog (penalty shoot-out scored)	3–1	(penalty shoot-out missed) Sharland; (penalty shoot-out scored) Michelsen; (penalty shoot-out missed) Flynn; (penalty shoot-out missed) Punt

Umpires:
Soledad Iparraguirre (ARG)
Julie Ashton-Lucy (AUS)

Bronze final

10 August 2012
15:30

New Zealand	1–3	Great Britain (bronze)
Michelsen 68'	Report	Danson 45'; Cullen 59'; Thomas 63'

Umpires:
Soledad Iparraguirre (ARG)
Chieko Soma (JPN)

== Football ==
=== Men's tournament ===
Team roster

The following is the New Zealand roster in the men's football tournament of the 2012 Summer Olympics.

Coach: (United Kingdom) Neil Emblen

No.	Pos.	Player	Date of birth (age)	Caps	Goals	2012 club
1	GK	Jake Gleeson	26 June 1990 (aged 22)	3	0	(United States Soccer Federation) Portland Timbers
2	DF	Tim Payne	10 January 1994 (aged 18)	0	0	(The Football Association) Blackburn Rovers
3	DF	Ian Hogg	15 December 1989 (aged 22)	9	0	(New Zealand Football) Auckland City
4	DF	Tim Myers	17 September 1990 (aged 21)	2	0	(New Zealand Football) Waitakere United
5	DF	Tommy Smith	31 March 1990 (aged 22)	0	0	(The Football Association) Ipswich Town
6	DF	Ryan Nelsen* (c)	18 October 1977 (aged 34)	2	0	(The Football Association) Queens Park Rangers
7	FW	Kosta Barbarouses	19 February 1990 (aged 22)	5	4	(Hellenic Football Federation) Panathinaikos
8	MF	Michael McGlinchey*	7 January 1987 (aged 25)	0	0	(Football Australia) Central Coast Mariners
9	FW	Shane Smeltz*	29 September 1981 (aged 30)	5	7	(Football Australia) Perth Glory
10	FW	Chris Wood	7 December 1991 (aged 20)	0	0	(The Football Association) West Bromwich Albion
11	MF	Marco Rojas	5 November 1991 (aged 20)	0	0	(Football Australia) Melbourne Victory
12	DF	Adam Thomas	1 April 1992 (aged 20)	4	0	(New Zealand Football) Waikato
13	MF	Alex Feneridis	13 November 1989 (aged 22)	4	0	(New Zealand Football) Auckland City
14	DF	James Musa	1 April 1992 (aged 20)	4	2	(New Zealand Football) Team Wellington
15	MF	Cameron Howieson	22 December 1994 (aged 17)	0	0	(The Football Association) Burnley
16	FW	Dakota Lucas	26 June 1991 (aged 21)	4	0	(Football Australia) Sunshine Coast
17	MF	Adam McGeorge	30 March 1989 (aged 23)	3	0	(New Zealand Football) Auckland City
18	GK	Michael O'Keeffe	9 August 1990 (aged 21)	1	0	(United States Soccer Federation) Fairfield University

* Over-aged player.

Group play

Pos	Team	Pld	W	D	L	GF	GA	GD	Pts	Qualification
1	Brazil	3	3	0	0	9	3	+6	9	Advance to knockout stage
2	Egypt	3	1	1	1	6	5	+1	4	Advance to knockout stage
3	Belarus	3	1	0	2	3	6	−3	3	
4	New Zealand	3	0	1	2	1	5	−4	1	

Source: FIFA
Rules for classification: Group stage tiebreakers
26 July 2012
19:45

Belarus	1–0	New Zealand
Baha 45+1'	Report

City of Coventry Stadium, Coventry
Attendance: 14,457
Referee: Bakary Gassama (Gambia)

29 July 2012
12:00

Egypt	1–1	New Zealand
Salah 40'	Report	Wood 17'

Old Trafford, Manchester
Attendance: 50,050
Referee: Mark Clattenburg (Great Britain)

1 August 2012
14:30

Brazil	3–0	New Zealand
Danilo 23'; Damião 29'; Sandro 52'	Report

St James' Park, Newcastle
Attendance: 25,201
Referee: Bakary Gassama (Gambia)

=== Women's tournament ===
Team roster

Head coach: (United Kingdom) Tony Readings

New Zealand named a squad of 18 players and 4 alternates for the tournament.

No.	Pos.	Player	Date of birth (age)	Caps	Goals	Club
1	GK	Jenny Bindon	25 February 1973 (aged 39)	69	0	(New Zealand Football) Hibiscus Coast
2	DF	Ria Percival	7 December 1989 (aged 22)	70	8	(German Football Association) FFC Frankfurt
3	DF	Anna Green	20 August 1990 (aged 21)	50	6	(German Football Association) Lokomotive Leipzig
4	MF	Katie Hoyle	1 February 1988 (aged 24)	62	1	(German Football Association) Bad Neuenahr
5	DF	Abby Erceg	20 November 1989 (aged 22)	72	4	(New Zealand Football) Fencibles United
6	DF	Rebecca Smith (captain)	17 June 1981 (aged 31)	68	4	(German Football Association) VfL Wolfsburg
7	DF	Ali Riley	30 October 1987 (aged 24)	61	1	(Swedish Football Association) Malmö
8	MF	Hayley Moorwood	13 February 1984 (aged 28)	80	10	(The Football Association) Chelsea
9	FW	Amber Hearn	28 November 1984 (aged 27)	59	30	(German Football Association) FF USV Jena
10	FW	Sarah Gregorius	6 August 1987 (aged 24)	28	15	(German Football Association) Bad Neuenahr
11	MF	Kirsty Yallop	4 November 1986 (aged 25)	59	11	(Swedish Football Association) Vittsjö
12	MF	Betsy Hassett	4 August 1990 (aged 21)	38	4	(United States Soccer Federation) California Golden Bears
13	FW	Rosie White	6 June 1993 (aged 19)	35	9	(United States Soccer Federation) UCLA Bruins
14	DF	Kristy Hill	1 July 1979 (aged 33)	19	0	(New Zealand Football) Eastern Suburbs
15	DF	Rebekah Stott	17 July 1993 (aged 19)	3	0	(Football Australia) Melbourne Victory
16	MF	Annalie Longo	1 July 1991 (aged 21)	42	0	(New Zealand Football) Three Kings United
17	FW	Hannah Wilkinson	28 May 1992 (aged 20)	33	12	(New Zealand Football) Glenfield Rovers
18	GK	Rebecca Rolls	22 August 1975 (aged 36)	14	0	(New Zealand Football) Fencibles United

Group play

Pos	Team	Pld	W	D	L	GF	GA	GD	Pts	Qualification
1	Great Britain	3	3	0	0	5	0	+5	9	Qualified for the quarter-finals
2	Brazil	3	2	0	1	6	1	+5	6	Qualified for the quarter-finals
3	New Zealand	3	1	0	2	3	3	0	3	Qualified for the quarter-finals
4	Cameroon	3	0	0	3	1	11	−10	0	

Source: IOC
25 July 2012
16:00

Great Britain	1–0	New Zealand
Houghton 64'	Report

Millennium Stadium, Cardiff
Attendance: 24,445
Referee: Kari Seitz (United States)

28 July 2012
14:30

New Zealand	0–1	Brazil
	Report	Cristiane 86'

Millennium Stadium, Cardiff
Attendance: 30,103
Referee: Bibiana Steinhaus (Germany)

31 July 2012
19:45

New Zealand	3–1	Cameroon
Smith 43'; Sonkeng 49' (o.g.); Gregorius 62'	Report	Onguéné 75'

City of Coventry Stadium, Coventry
Attendance: 11,425
Referee: Christina Pedersen (Norway)

Quarter-final

3 August 2012
14:30

United States	2–0	New Zealand
Wambach 27'; Leroux 87'	Report

St James' Park, Newcastle
Attendance: 10,441
Referee: Salomé di Iorio (Argentina)

== Judo ==
Athlete	Event	Round of 32	Round of 16	Quarterfinals	Semifinals	Repechage	Final / BM	
Athlete	Event	Opposition Result	Opposition Result	Opposition Result	Opposition Result	Opposition Result	Opposition Result	Rank
Moira de Villiers	Women's −70 kg	Thiele (GER); L 0002–0010	Did not advance					

== Rowing ==
Men

Athlete	Event	Heats		Repechage		Quarterfinals		Semifinals		Final	
Athlete	Event	Time	Rank	Time	Rank	Time	Rank	Time	Rank	Time	Rank
Mahé Drysdale	Single sculls	6:49.69	1 QF	Bye		6:54.86	1 SA/B	7:18.11	1 FA	6:57.82	1st place, gold medalist(s)
Hamish Bond; Eric Murray	Pair	6:08.50 WR	1 SA/B	Bye		—N/a		6:48.11	1 FA	6:16.65	1st place, gold medalist(s)
Nathan Cohen; Joseph Sullivan	Double sculls	6:11.30 OR	1 SA/B	Bye		—N/a		6:19.79	3 FA	6:31.67	1st place, gold medalist(s)
Peter Taylor; Storm Uru	Lightweight double sculls	6:37.02	2 SA/B	Bye		—N/a		6:36.71	3 FA	6:40.86	3rd place, bronze medalist(s)
Chris Harris; Sean O'Neill; Jade Uru; Tyson Williams	Four	5:51.84	4 R	6:03.66	2 SA/B	—N/a		6:06.36	4 FB	6:11.97	11
Michael Arms; Robbie Manson; John Storey; Matthew Trott	Quadruple sculls	5:41.62	4 R	5:43.82	1 SA/B	—N/a		6:10.95	4 FB	5:58.88	7

Women

Athlete	Event	Heats		Repechage		Quarterfinals		Semifinals		Final	
Athlete	Event	Time	Rank	Time	Rank	Time	Rank	Time	Rank	Time	Rank
Emma Twigg	Single sculls	7:40.24	4 QF	Bye		7:39.07	5 SA/B	7:46.71	3 FA	8:01.76	4
Juliette Haigh; Rebecca Scown	Pair	7:06.93	2 FA	Bye		—N/a				7:30.19	3rd place, bronze medalist(s)
Fiona Paterson; Anna Reymer	Double sculls	6:49.44	2 FA	Bye		—N/a				7:09.82	5
Louise Ayling; Julia Edward	Lightweight double sculls	7:02.78	3 R	7:21.29	2 SA/B	—N/a		7:15.06	5 FB	7:22.78	9
Fiona Bourke; Sarah Gray; Eve Macfarlane; Louise Trappitt	Quadruple sculls	6:20.22	3 R	6:48.71	6 FB	—N/a				6:56.46	7

Qualification Legend: FA=Final A (medal); FB=Final B (non-medal); FC=Final C (non-medal); FD=Final D (non-medal); FE=Final E (non-medal); FF=Final F (non-medal); SA/B=Semifinals A/B; SC/D=Semifinals C/D; SE/F=Semifinals E/F; QF=Quarterfinals; R=Repechage

== Sailing ==
Men

Athlete	Event	Race											Net points	Final rank
Athlete	Event	1	2	3	4	5	6	7	8	9	10	M*	Net points	Final rank
JP Tobin	RS:X	15	4	3	7	8	8	12	6	~~17~~	17	16	96	7
Andrew Murdoch	Laser	12	8	17	~~18~~	1	7	13	15	3	3	8	87	5
Dan Slater	Finn	7	11	1	6	~~17~~	11	6	15	8	14	4	83	7
Paul Snow-Hansen; Jason Saunders	470	~~28~~; ~~DSQ~~	3	5	4	16	3	7	9	13	12	14	86	5
Hamish Pepper; Jim Turner	Star	~~15~~	7	1	13	6	5	9	8	8	9	4	70	5

Women
Fleet racing

Athlete	Event	Race											Net points	Final rank
Athlete	Event	1	2	3	4	5	6	7	8	9	10	M*	Net points	Final rank
Sara Winther	Laser Radial	31	23	21	15	35	31	9	11	~~42~~; ~~BFD~~	9	EL	185	20
Jo Aleh; Polly Powrie	470	2	6	2	5	10	4	1	1	2	~~18~~	2	35	1st place, gold medalist(s)

Match racing

Athlete	Event	Round Robin											Rank	Knockouts			Rank
Athlete	Event	NED	SWE	ESP	DEN	POR	AUS	USA	GBR	FRA	FIN	RUS	Rank	Q-final	S-final	Final	Rank
Jenna Hansen; Steph Hazard; Susannah Pyatt	Elliott 6m	L	W	L	W	W	L	L	W	L	L	L	9	Did not advance			

Open

Athlete	Event	Race																Net points	Final rank
Athlete	Event	1	2	3	4	5	6	7	8	9	10	11	12	13	14	15	M*	Net points	Final rank
Peter Burling; Blair Tuke	49er	9	7	1	7	3	5	9	11	7	2	1	2	~~15~~	6	6	4	80	2nd place, silver medalist(s)

M = Medal race; EL = Eliminated – did not advance into the medal race;

== Shooting ==
New Zealand has qualified 1 quota place.

Men

Athlete	Event	Qualification		Final	
Athlete	Event	Points	Rank	Points	Rank
Ryan Taylor	50 m rifle prone	592	25	Did not advance	

== Swimming ==
Men

Athlete	Event	Heat		Semifinal		Final	
Athlete	Event	Time	Rank	Time	Rank	Time	Rank
Daniel Bell	100 m backstroke	55.53	37	Did not advance			
Daniel Bell	100 m butterfly	53.76	37	Did not advance			
Gareth Kean	100 m backstroke	54.26	14 Q	54.00	13	Did not advance	
Gareth Kean	200 m backstroke	2:00.54	29	Did not advance			
Glenn Snyders	100 m breaststroke	59.78 NR	5 Q	1:00.15	15	Did not advance	
Glenn Snyders	200 m breaststroke	2:10.55 NR	10 Q	2:11.14	14	Did not advance	
Matthew Stanley	200 m freestyle	1:48.19	18	Did not advance			
Matthew Stanley	400 m freestyle	3:49.44	15	—N/a		Did not advance	
Dylan Dunlop-Barrett; Steven Kent; Andrew McMillan; Matthew Stanley	4 × 200 m freestyle relay	7:17.18	15	—N/a		Did not advance	
Daniel Bell; Gareth Kean; Andrew McMillan; Carl O'Donnell; Glenn Snyders; Matthew Stanley	4 × 100 m medley relay	3:34.52	9	—N/a		Did not advance	

Women

Athlete	Event	Heat		Semifinal		Final	
Athlete	Event	Time	Rank	Time	Rank	Time	Rank
Lauren Boyle	400 m freestyle	4:03.63 NR	4 Q	—N/a		4:06.25	8
Lauren Boyle	800 m freestyle	8:25.91 NR	5 Q	—N/a		8:22.72 NR	4
Melissa Ingram	100 m backstroke	1:01.94	30	Did not advance			
Melissa Ingram	200 m backstroke	2:10.63	17	Did not advance			
Hayley Palmer	50 m freestyle	25.47	23	Did not advance			
Natalie Wiegersma	200 m individual medley	2:16.24	26	Did not advance			
Natalie Wiegersma	400 m individual medley	4:44.78	19	—N/a		Did not advance	
Amaka Gessler; Natasha Hind; Penelope Marshall; Hayley Palmer	4 × 100 m freestyle relay	3:42.55	14	—N/a		Did not advance	
Lauren Boyle; Amaka Gessler; Natasha Hind; Melissa Ingram; Samantha Lucie-Smith; Penelope Marshall	4 × 200 m freestyle relay	7:55.92	11	—N/a		Did not advance	

== Taekwondo ==
Athlete	Event	Round of 16	Quarterfinals	Semifinals	Repechage	Bronze Medal	Final	
Athlete	Event	Opposition Result	Opposition Result	Opposition Result	Opposition Result	Opposition Result	Opposition Result	Rank
Logan Campbell	Men's −68 kg	Husarov (UKR); L 6–10	Did not advance					
Vaughn Scott	Men's −80 kg	Crismanich (ARG); L 5–9	Did not advance		Bahave (AFG); L 6–11	Did not advance		
Robin Cheong	Women's −57 kg	Wahba (EGY); L 6–17	Did not advance					

== Tennis ==
Athlete	Event	Round of 64	Round of 32	Round of 16	Quarterfinals	Semifinals	Final / BM	
Athlete	Event	Opposition Score	Opposition Score	Opposition Score	Opposition Score	Opposition Score	Opposition Score	Rank
Marina Erakovic	Women's singles	Wozniak (CAN); L 2–6, 1–6	Did not advance					

== Triathlon ==
New Zealand has a total of 6 quota places – 3 each for both the men's and women's triathlon.

Athlete	Event	Swim (1.5 km)	Trans 1	Bike (40 km)	Trans 2	Run (10 km)	Total Time	Rank
Bevan Docherty	Men's	17:26	0:37	58:51	0:29	31:12	1:48:35	12
Kris Gemmell	Men's	17:26	0:37	58:48	0:30	31:31	1:48:52	15
Ryan Sissons	Men's	18:05	0:37	59:45	0:29	31:31	1:50:27	33
Andrea Hewitt	Women's	19:28	0:42	1:05:26	0:30	34:30	2:00:36	6
Kate McIlroy	Women's	19:31	0:41	1:05:26	0:36	35:14	2:01:28	10
Nicky Samuels	Women's	19:46	0:40	1:07:00	0:32	36:50	2:04:48	35

== Weightlifting ==
Athlete	Event	Snatch		Clean & Jerk		Total	Rank
Athlete	Event	Result	Rank	Result	Rank	Total	Rank
Richie Patterson	Men's −85 kg	150	=13	186	14	336	14

== Officials ==
- Dave Currie – Chef De Mission
- Gary Hurring – Swim team coach

== See also ==
- New Zealand at the Olympics
- New Zealand Olympic medallists
- New Zealand at the 2012 Summer Paralympics
