= Carina Bär =

German rower (born 1990)

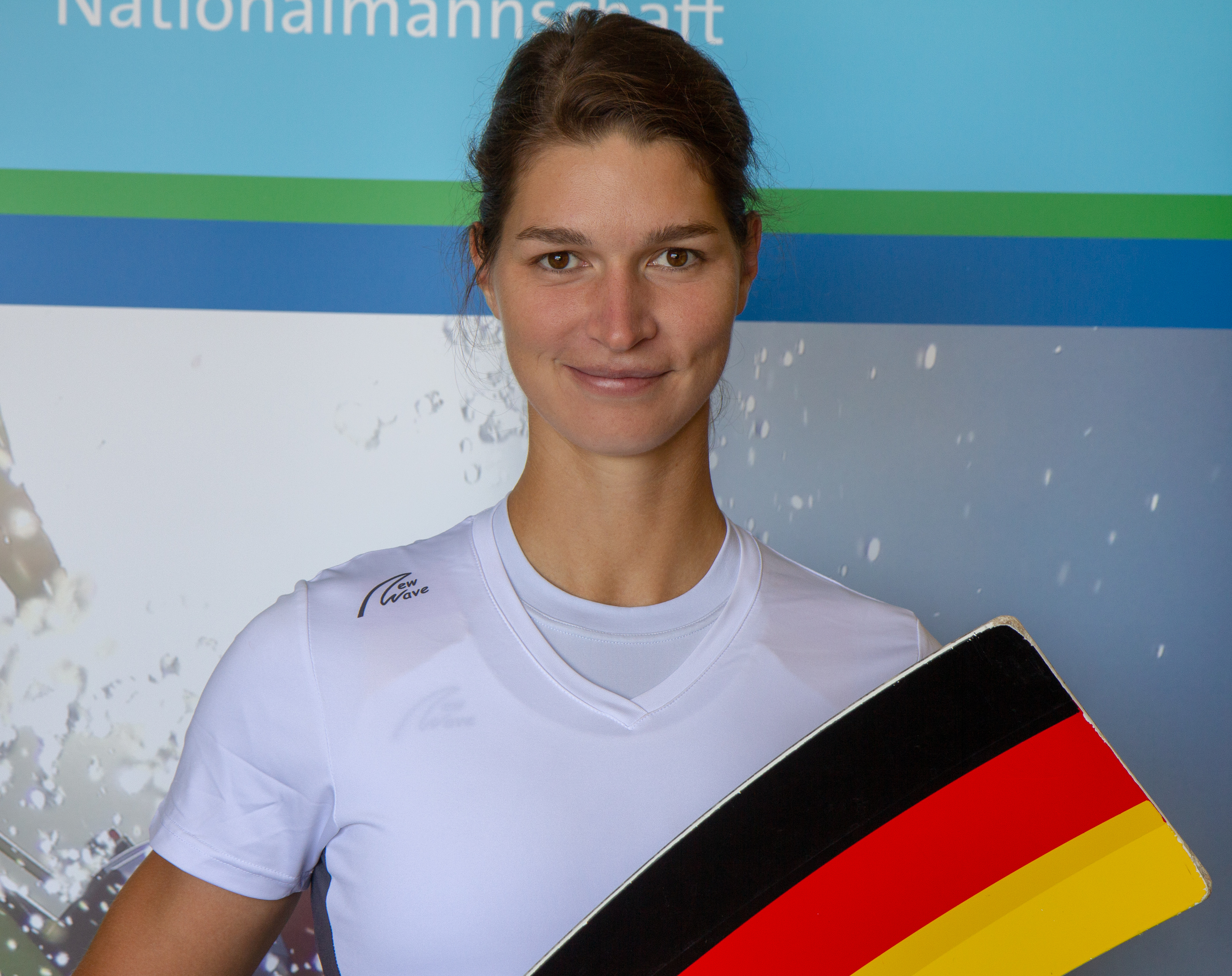
- Bär in 2018
Medal record
Women's rowing
Representing Germany
Olympic Games
Gold medal – first place	2016 Rio de Janeiro	Quadruple sculls
Silver medal – second place	2012 London	Quadruple sculls
World Championships
Gold medal – first place	2013 Chungjiu	Quadruple sculls
Gold medal – first place	2014 Amsterdam	Quadruple sculls
Silver medal – second place	2015 Aiguebelette	Quadruple sculls
Bronze medal – third place	2010 Karapiro	Quadruple sculls
European Championships
Gold medal – first place	2013 Seville	Quadruple sculls
Gold medal – first place	2015 Poznan	Quadruple sculls
Gold medal – first place	2016 Brandenburg	Quadruple sculls
Silver medal – second place	2010 Montemor-o-velho	Quadruple sculls

Carina Bär (also spelled Baer; born 23 January 1990 in Heilbronn) is a German rower. At the 2016 Summer Olympics in Rio de Janeiro she competed in the women's quadruple sculls competition in which the German team (Bär, Annekatrin Thiele, Julia Lier and Lisa Schmidla) won the gold medal. She had previous won the silver medal in the same event at the 2012 Summer Olympics.

At the World level, Bär won the 2013 title with Thiele, Julia Richter and Britta Oppelt. Bär, Thiele, Schmidla and Lier won the 2014 World Championships in a world's best time (which remains the world's best time in January 2019). The team of Bär, Thiele, Schmidla and Marie-Catherine Arnold won the silver medal at the 2015 World Championship in the women's quadruple sculls. Bär also has a World bronze medal from 2010 (with Oppelt, Richter and Tina Manker).

At the European level, the team of Bär, Thiele, Schmidla and Arnold won the 2015 and 2016 European Championship in the women's quadruple sculls, the latter on home water in Brandenburg. Bär had previous won the European title with Thiele, Richter and Oppelt in 2013. In 2010 she was part of the German women's quadruple sculls team that finished second.

At Junior level, Bär won a silver in the single sculls at the 2011 World Under 23 Championships, having won a bronze in 2009. She also won the women's Junior Single Sculls World title in 2008.
