= Fiona Albert =

Australian rower (born 1990)

Personal information
- Born: 12 December 1990 (age 35) Pittsburgh, Pennsylvania, U.S.
- Home town: Brisbane, Australia
- Height: 174 cm (5 ft 9 in)
- Weight: 70 kg (154 lb)

Sport
- Country: Australia
- Sport: Rowing
- Events: Women's eight (W8+); Women's coxless four (W4-)
- Club: Mercantile Rowing Club
- Coached by: Thomas Westgarth
Medal record
Women's rowing
Representing Australia
U23 World Championships
Gold medal – first place	U23 2013 Linz	W4-

Fiona Albert (born 12 December 1990) is an Australian rower. She competed in the women's eight event at the 2016 Summer Olympics.

== Club and state rowing ==
Raised in Brisbane, Albert was educated at Brisbane Girls Grammar School where she took up rowing. She attended the University of Queensland, studying Arts/Law. She later relocated to Victoria and rowed from the Mercantile Rowing Club.

Albert was first selected to represent Queensland in the women's youth eight in 2009 contesting the Bicentennial Cup at the Interstate Regatta within the Australian Rowing Championships. She rowed again in the Queensland Youth Eight in 2010. From 2011 to 2016 she rowed in Queensland's senior women's eights who contested the Queen's Cup at the Interstate Regatta within the Australian Rowing Championships. The Queensland eights took the silver medal in five of those six years.

== International representative rowing ==
Albert was first selected for Australian representation in a coxless four contesting the 2012 World Rowing U23 Championships in Trakai, Lithuania. That four rowed to a silver medal.

Albert attempted for three years to be selected as a senior athlete. She was the travelling reserve for two years for the women's quad scull. She rowed in a double scull at the 2014 World Rowing Cup I in Sydney with Rhiannon Hughes and as a single sculler at the WRC III that year in Lucerne in her role as travelling reserve.

In 2015 she again contested single sculls at both World Rowing Cups in Europe role as travelling reserve. Kim Crow was a sculler at that time and the crewed boats were made up by Olympia Aldersey, Sally Kehoe, Jessica Hall, Kerry Hore, Madeleine Edmunds and Jennifer Cleary.

Albert was in the bow seat of the Australian women's eight who missed qualification for the 2016 Rio Olympics but received a late call up following the Russian drug scandal. WADA had discovered Russian state sponsored drug testing violations and the IOC acted to protect clean athletes and set strict entry guidelines for Russian athletes resulting in most of their rowers and nearly all of their crews being withdrawn from the Olympic regatta.

The crew had dispersed two months earlier after their failure to qualify but reconvened, travelled at the last minute to Rio and borrowed a shell. They finished last in their heat, last in the repechage and were eliminated.

Albert was one of nine Australia athletes arrested in Rio as part of the 'ticket-gate' scandal. The athletes were arrested after tampering with their passes to gain access to a basketball semi-final. They were charged with falsifying a document. AOC officials needed to drive interstate to pay the R$90,000 fine ($36,000 AUD) before passports would be returned to the athletes so they can leave the country. The fine was paid to prevent imprisonment. Officials from Australia said it was an innocent mistake however it is common practice for athletes to tamper with accreditation.
