= Rowing at the 2016 Summer Olympics – Women's quadruple sculls =

Women's quadruple sculls at the Games of the XXXI Olympiad
- Venue: Rodrigo de Freitas Lagoon
- Date: 6–11 August 2016
- Competitors: 28 from 7 nations
- Winning time: 6:49:39

Medalists
1st place, gold medalist(s)		Annekatrin Thiele; Carina Bär; Julia Lier; Lisa Schmidla	Germany
2nd place, silver medalist(s)		Chantal Achterberg; Nicole Beukers; Inge Janssen; Carline Bouw	Netherlands
3rd place, bronze medalist(s)		Maria Springwald; Joanna Leszczyńska; Agnieszka Kobus; Monika Ciaciuch	Poland

The women's quadruple sculls competition at the 2016 Summer Olympics in Rio de Janeiro was held on 6–11 August at the Lagoon Rodrigo de Freitas.

The medals for the competition were presented by Irena Szewińska, Poland, member of the International Olympic Committee, and the gifts were presented by Lenka Wech, Germany, Member of the Executive Committee of the International Rowing Federation.

== Results ==
=== Heats ===
Winners of each heat qualify to final, remainder goes to the repechage.

==== Heat 1 ====
Rank	Rower	Country	Time	Notes
1	Daryna Verkhohliad; Olena Buryak; Anastasiya Kozhenkova; Ievgeniia Nimchenko	Ukraine	6:35.48	FA
2	Jessica Hall; Kerry Hore; Jennifer Cleary; Madeleine Edmunds	Australia	6:37.43	R
3	Chantal Achterberg; Nicole Beukers; Inge Janssen; Carline Bouw	Netherlands	6:38.58	R
4	Zhang Ling; Jiang Yan; Wang Yuwei; Zhang Xinyue	China	6:40.21	R

==== Heat 2 ====
Rank	Rower	Country	Time	Notes
1	Annekatrin Thiele; Carina Bär; Julia Lier; Lisa Schmidla	Germany	6:30.86	FA
2	Maria Springwald; Joanna Leszczyńska; Agnieszka Kobus; Monika Ciaciuch	Poland	6:33.43	R
3	Grace Latz; Tracy Eisser; Megan Kalmoe; Adrienne Martelli	United States	6:40.78	R

=== Repechage ===
First four of heat qualify to Final.

Rank	Rower	Country	Time	Notes
1	Chantal Achterberg; Nicole Beukers; Inge Janssen; Carline Bouw	Netherlands	6:24.61	FA
2	Maria Springwald; Joanna Leszczyńska; Agnieszka Kobus; Monika Ciaciuch	Poland	6:25.49	FA
3	Zhang Ling; Jiang Yan; Wang Yuwei; Zhang Xinyue	China	6:28.49	FA
4	Grace Latz; Tracy Eisser; Megan Kalmoe; Adrienne Martelli	United States	6:28.54	FA
5	Jessica Hall; Kerry Hore; Jennifer Cleary; Madeleine Edmunds	Australia	6:28.60	

=== Final ===
Rank	Rower	Country	Time	Notes
1st place, gold medalist(s)	Annekatrin Thiele; Carina Bär; Julia Lier; Lisa Schmidla	Germany	6:49:39	Lane 4
2nd place, silver medalist(s)	Chantal Achterberg; Nicole Beukers; Inge Janssen; Carline Bouw	Netherlands	6:50:33	Lane 5
3rd place, bronze medalist(s)	Maria Springwald; Joanna Leszczyńska; Agnieszka Kobus; Monika Ciaciuch	Poland	6:50:86	Lane 2
4	Daryna Verkhohliad; Olena Buryak; Anastasiya Kozhenkova; Ievgeniia Nimchenko	Ukraine	6:56:09	Lane 3
5	Grace Latz; Tracy Eisser; Megan Kalmoe; Adrienne Martelli	United States	6:57:67	Lane 1
6	Zhang Ling; Jiang Yan; Wang Yuwei; Zhang Xinyue	China	6:59:45	Lane 6
