= Rowing at the 2014 Asian Games – Women's quadruple sculls =

Women's quadruple sculls at the 2014 Asian Games
- Venue: Tangeum Lake
- Date: 21–25 September 2014
- Competitors: 36 from 9 nations

Medalists
gold medal	China; Wang Min, Shen Xiaoxing, Wang Yuwei, Zhang Xinyue
silver medal	South Korea; Kim Seul-gi, Ma Se-rom, Jeon Seo-yeong, Kim A-rum
bronze medal	Vietnam; Lê Thị An, Phạm Thị Huệ, Phạm Thị Thảo, Phạm Thị Hài

The women's quadruple sculls competition at the 2014 Asian Games in Chungju, South Korea was held from 21 September to 25 September at the Tangeum Lake International Rowing Center.

== Schedule ==
All times are Korea Standard Time (UTC+09:00)

Date	Time	Event
Sunday, 21 September 2014	11:20	Heats
Tuesday, 23 September 2014	10:40	Repechage
Thursday, 25 September 2014	10:30	Finals

== Results ==
Legend

- DSQ — Disqualified

=== Heats ===
- Qualification: 1–2 → Final A (FA), 3–5 → Repechage (R)

==== Heat 1 ====
Rank	Team	Time	Notes
1	China (CHN); Wang Min; Shen Xiaoxing; Wang Yuwei; Zhang Xinyue	6:49.05	FA
2	South Korea (KOR); Kim Seul-gi; Ma Se-rom; Jeon Seo-yeong; Kim A-rum	6:53.20	FA
3	Chinese Taipei (TPE); Pai Chien-yu; Lin Yu-hsun; Lee Pei-chen; Chiu Pei-yu	7:07.36	R
4	North Korea (PRK); Kil Won-sim; O Yong-mi; Ri Sol-gyong; Kim Un-sil	7:18.69	R
5	India (IND); Amanjot Kaur; Sanjukta Dungdung; Narengbam Lakshmi Devi; Navneet Kaur	7:26.50	R

==== Heat 2 ====
Rank	Team	Time	Notes
1	Vietnam (VIE); Lê Thị An; Phạm Thị Huệ; Phạm Thị Thảo; Phạm Thị Hài	6:55.75	FA
2	Kazakhstan (KAZ); Yekaterina Artemyeva; Svetlana Germanovich; Mariya Vassilyeva; Viktoriya Chepikova	6:58.19	FA
3	Thailand (THA); Tippaporn Pitukpaothai; Mattika Maneekaew; Matinee Raruen; Sawittree Laksoongnoen	7:11.60	R
4	Iran (IRI); Maryam Saeidi; Nazanin Rahmani; Mahsa Javer; Nazanin Malaei	7:15.70	R

=== Repechage ===
- Qualification: 1–2 → Final A (FA), 3–5 → Final B (FB)

Rank	Team	Time	Notes
1	Chinese Taipei (TPE); Pai Chien-yu; Lin Yu-hsun; Lee Pei-chen; Chiu Pei-yu	7:01.52	FA
2	Iran (IRI); Maryam Saeidi; Nazanin Rahmani; Mahsa Javer; Nazanin Malaei	7:05.87	FA
3	North Korea (PRK); Kil Won-sim; O Yong-mi; Ri Sol-gyong; Kim Un-sil	7:09.71	FB
4	Thailand (THA); Tippaporn Pitukpaothai; Mattika Maneekaew; Matinee Raruen; Sawittree Laksoongnoen	7:10.97	FB
5	India (IND); Amanjot Kaur; Sanjukta Dungdung; Narengbam Lakshmi Devi; Navneet Kaur	7:51.39	FB

=== Finals ===
==== Final B ====
Rank	Team	Time
1	Thailand (THA); Tippaporn Pitukpaothai; Mattika Maneekaew; Matinee Raruen; Sawittree Laksoongnoen	7:01.18
2	India (IND); Amanjot Kaur; Sanjukta Dungdung; Narengbam Lakshmi Devi; Navneet Kaur	7:10.55
—	North Korea (PRK); Kil Won-sim; O Yong-mi; Ri Sol-gyong; Kim Un-sil	DSQ

==== Final A ====
Rank	Team	Time
1st place, gold medalist(s)	China (CHN); Wang Min; Shen Xiaoxing; Wang Yuwei; Zhang Xinyue	6:40.55
2nd place, silver medalist(s)	South Korea (KOR); Kim Seul-gi; Ma Se-rom; Jeon Seo-yeong; Kim A-rum	6:46.54
3rd place, bronze medalist(s)	Vietnam (VIE); Lê Thị An; Phạm Thị Huệ; Phạm Thị Thảo; Phạm Thị Hài	6:51.38
4	Kazakhstan (KAZ); Yekaterina Artemyeva; Svetlana Germanovich; Mariya Vassilyeva; Viktoriya Chepikova	6:56.84
5	Chinese Taipei (TPE); Pai Chien-yu; Lin Yu-hsun; Lee Pei-chen; Chiu Pei-yu	7:03.84
6	Iran (IRI); Maryam Saeidi; Nazanin Rahmani; Mahsa Javer; Nazanin Malaei	7:08.89
