= Joanna Leszczyńska =

Polish rower (born 1988)

Medal record

Women's rowing

Representing Poland
Event	1st	2nd	3rd
Olympic Games	0	0	1
World Championships	0	0	2
European Championships	0	2	1
Total	0	2	3

Olympic Games
Bronze medal – third place	2016 Rio de Janeiro	Quadruple sculls

World Championships
Bronze medal – third place	2013 Chungjiu	W4x

European Championships
Silver medal – second place	2012 Varese	W4x
Silver medal – second place	2016 Brandenburg	W4x
Bronze medal – third place	2015 Poznań	W4x

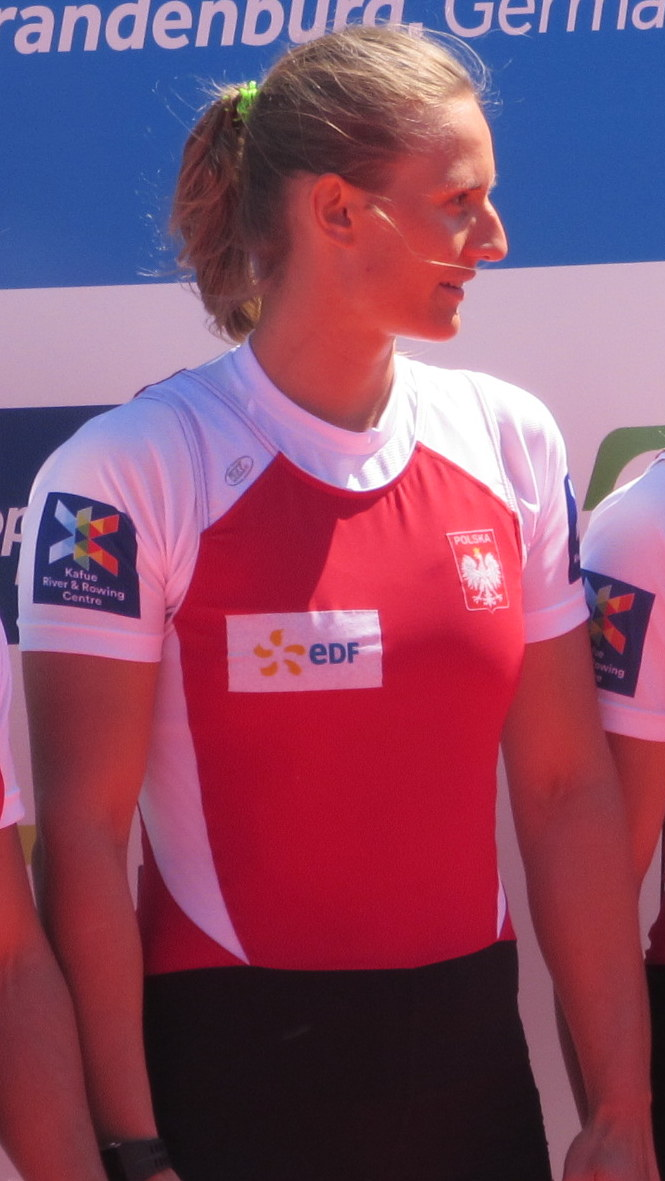
Leszczyńska in 2016

Joanna Leszczyńska (Polish pronunciation: [jɔˈanna lɛʂˈt͡ʂɨj̃ska]; born 18 December 1988 in Warsaw) is a Polish rower. At the 2012 Summer Olympics, she competed in the women's quadruple sculls. She won bronze medal in quadruple sculls at the 2016 Summer Olympics, with Maria Springwald, Agnieszka Kobus and Monika Ciaciuch. That was also the team that won silver at the 2016 European Championships and bronze at the 2015 European Championships on home water in Poznan.

Leszczyńska had previously won bronze in the women's quadruple sculls at the 2013 World Championships with Sylwia Lewandowska, Magdalena Fularczyk and Natalia Madaj.

She had previously won European silver in 2012 in the quadruple sculls with Kamila Socko, Sylwia Lewandowska and Natalia Madaj.

== See also ==
- Joanna Leszczyńska at World Rowing
