= Sylwia Lewandowska =

Polish rower (born 1991)

Medal record

Women's rowing

Representing Poland

World Championships
Bronze medal – third place	2013 Chungjiu	W4x

European Championships
Silver medal – second place	2011 Plovdiv	W4x
Silver medal – second place	2012 Varese	W4x

Sylwia Lewandowska (born 4 January 1991 in Toruń) is a Polish rower. She is a World and Olympic medallist. At the 2012 Summer Olympics, she competed in the Women's quadruple sculls.

== Career ==
Lewandowska was part of the Polish quadruple sculls team that won the silver medal at the 2011 European Rowing Championships, alongside Agnieszka Kobus, Karolina Gniadek and Natalia Madaj. She won the silver in the event again in 2012, but that time the team consisted of Lewandowska, Madaj, Kamila Socko and Joanna Leszczynska. This was the same team that competed at the 2012 Olympics.

In 2013, the team of Lewandowska, Leszczynska, Madaj and Magdalena Fularczyk won the bronze medal at the World Championships.
