= Zoe Stevenson =

New Zealand rower

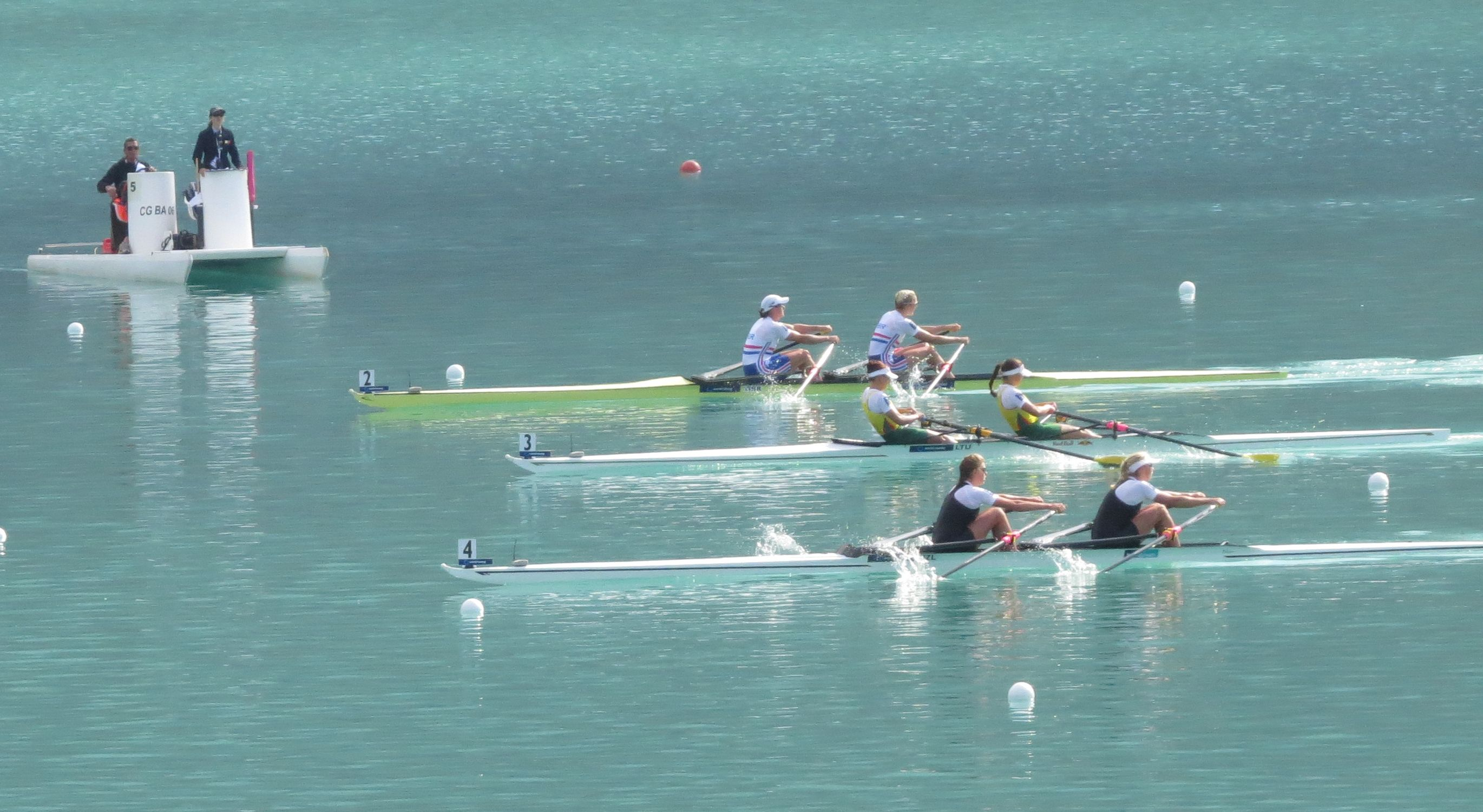
- MacFarlane and Stevenson on the way to gold in 2015

Personal information
- Born: 19 June 1991 (age 35) Tauranga, New Zealand
- Education: Tauranga Girls' College; University of Waikato

Sport
- Club: Tauranga
Medal record
Women's rowing
Representing New Zealand
World Championships
Gold medal – first place	2014 Amsterdam	Double scull
Gold medal – first place	2015 Aiguebelette	Double scull
Silver medal – second place	2013 Chungju	Double scull
World U23 Championships
Silver medal – second place	2010 Brest	U23 eight
Silver medal – second place	2011 Amsterdam	U23 eight
World Junior Championships
Silver medal – second place	2009 Brive-la-Gaillarde	Junior eight

Zoe Stevenson (born 19 June 1991) is a New Zealand rower. She won gold in the women's double sculls with Fiona Bourke at the 2014 World Rowing Championships.

Stevenson was born in 1991. She obtained her secondary education at Tauranga Girls' College, and then obtained a Bachelor of Science (BSc) from the University of Waikato. As of 2017 she is a stay at home mother to son 'Ted'.

Stevenson took up rowing in 2007. She first competed internationally at the 2009 World Rowing Junior Championships in Brive-la-Gaillarde, France, where she won silver with the junior women's eight.

At regattas in Varese (Italy) and Lucerne (Switzerland) in 2015, she competed in the double sculls with Eve MacFarlane, winning gold in both finals. The pair went to the 2015 World Rowing Championships held at Lac d'Aiguebelette in Aiguebelette, France, and again won gold. Stevenson and MacFarlane qualified for the 2016 Summer Olympics, but were beaten in the semi-finals by the US by 5/100 into fourth place, thus missing the A final. In November 2016, she announced that she would take 2017 off from rowing. She did not return to rowing for the 2018 season either, but has not announced her retirement from rowing.

Zoe is the daughter of retired NZ rower Andrew Stevenson.
