= Eve Macfarlane =

New Zealand rower

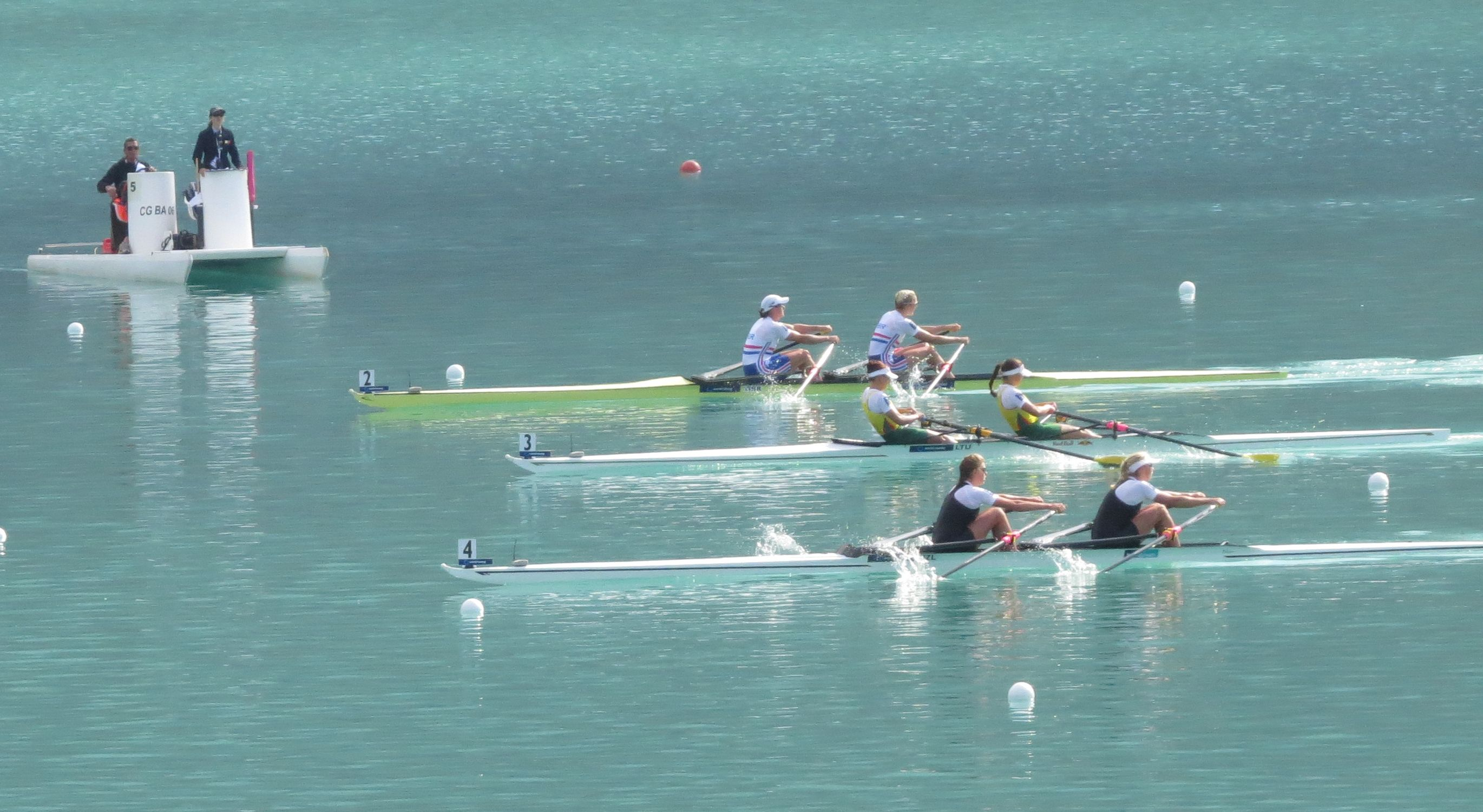
- Macfarlane and Stevenson on the way to gold in 2015

Personal information
- Nationality: New Zealand
- Born: 27 September 1992 (age 34)
- Home town: Cambridge, New Zealand
- Education: Rangi Ruru Girls' School
- Height: 183 cm (6 ft 0 in)
- Weight: 72 kg (159 lb)

Sport
- Club: Canterbury
Medal record
Women's rowing
Representing New Zealand
World Championships
Gold medal – first place	2015 Aiguebelette	W2x
Bronze medal – third place	2011 Bled	W4x

Eve Macfarlane (born 27 September 1992) is a retired New Zealand rower. Described as a "natural rower", she went to the 2009 World Rowing Junior Championships within a few months of having taken up rowing and won a silver medal. She represented New Zealand at the 2012 Summer Olympics in London as the country's youngest Olympian at those games. She was the 2015 world champion in the women's double sculls with Zoe Stevenson. At the 2016 Summer Olympics, they came fourth in the semi-finals and thus missed the A final.

== Junior rowing ==
Macfarlane was born in 1992 and grew up in Parnassus, just north of Cheviot. She was educated at Rangi Ruru Girls' School in Christchurch where she was into many sports, including "netball, basketball, athletics, volleyball, touch, cross-country running". She excelled at any sport she tried and Rex Farrelly, Rangi Ruru's long-term rowing coach, asked her if she wanted to try rowing, which she started in 2009. Farrelly says that "there's very few natural rowers. Eve was one." Gary Hay, one of the other rowing coaches at Rangi Ruru, describes her as a natural rower:

She possessed the natural timing and rhythm you look for in a rower. She had all the obvious physical attributes, the length of her arms and legs, incredible reach and she's strong. She was made to row really, in terms of her physique.

— Gary Hay, rowing coach

Macfarlane competed for Rangi Ruru in the 2009 and 2010 Maadi Cup national secondary school rowing championships, and was a member of the crews that won the Levin 75th Jubilee Cup (girls under-18 eights) and Dawn Cup (girls under-18 coxed fours) for the school in both years. Her 2009 Maadi Cup appearance guaranteed her a place in the junior women's eight that went to the World Rowing Junior Championships in August 2009 in Brive-la-Gaillarde, France; within months of having taken up rowing, she won a silver medal at a World Rowing Junior Championship. Zoe Stevenson and Francie Turner were also in the boat.

Macfarlane changed to a women's four and with Beatrix Heaphy-Hall, Jennifer Storey, and Grace Prendergast, she won gold at the 2010 World Rowing Junior Championships in Račice, Czech Republic. At the 2010 Summer Youth Olympics in Singapore, she won the B Final with Beatrix Heaphy-Hall in the junior women's pair.

== Elite rowing ==
She changed to the elite class in 2011, having skipped the under 23 class, and came under the guidance of national coach Dick Tonks. Tonks changed her from a sweep rower to a sculler and placed her in a women's quadruple scull. The four, which included Sarah Gray, Fiona Bourke and Louise Trappitt, surprised themselves by winning bronze at the regattas in Hamburg (Germany) and Lucerne (Switzerland). They maintained their form and won a bronze at the 2011 World Rowing Championships at Lake Bled in Bled, Slovenia.

In 2012, Macfarlane competed with the women's quad at regattas in Lucerne (Switzerland; fourth place) and Munich (Germany; fifth place). The quad then went to the 2012 Summer Olympics in London with a strong expectation for a medal when Trappitt "caught a crab" and snapped an oar at the 1500 m mark in the repechage. This cost the team their place in the final (they would have had to be within the first four but came last in the repechage), and they subsequently came first in the B final. Macfarlane was New Zealand's youngest representative in London.

In 2013, Macfarlane was part of the women's eight. At regattas in Sydney (Australia) and Lucerne (Switzerland), they came fifth and sixth, respectively. At the 2013 World Rowing Championships held at Tangeum Lake in Chungju, South Korea, the eight came first in the B final.

Macfarlane did not race in 2014. At regattas in Varese (Italy) and Lucerne (Switzerland) in 2015, she competed in the double sculls with Zoe Stevenson, winning gold in both finals. The pair went to the 2015 World Rowing Championships held at Lac d'Aiguebelette in Aiguebelette, France, and again won gold. Stevenson and Macfarlane qualified for the 2016 Summer Olympics, but were beaten in the semi-finals by the US by 5/100 into fourth place, thus missing the A final. In November 2016, both Macfarlane and Stevenson announced that they would take the 2017 rowing season off. Macfarlane announced her retirement from elite Rowing on 26 October 2021.

== Private life ==
Macfarlane lives in Cambridge to be close to Lake Karapiro for her rowing training. She holds a Diploma in Art and Creativity with honours, obtained through extramural study at the Learning Connexion in Wellington.
