= Rowing at the 2012 Summer Olympics – Women's quadruple sculls =

Women's quadruple sculls at the Games of the XXX Olympiad
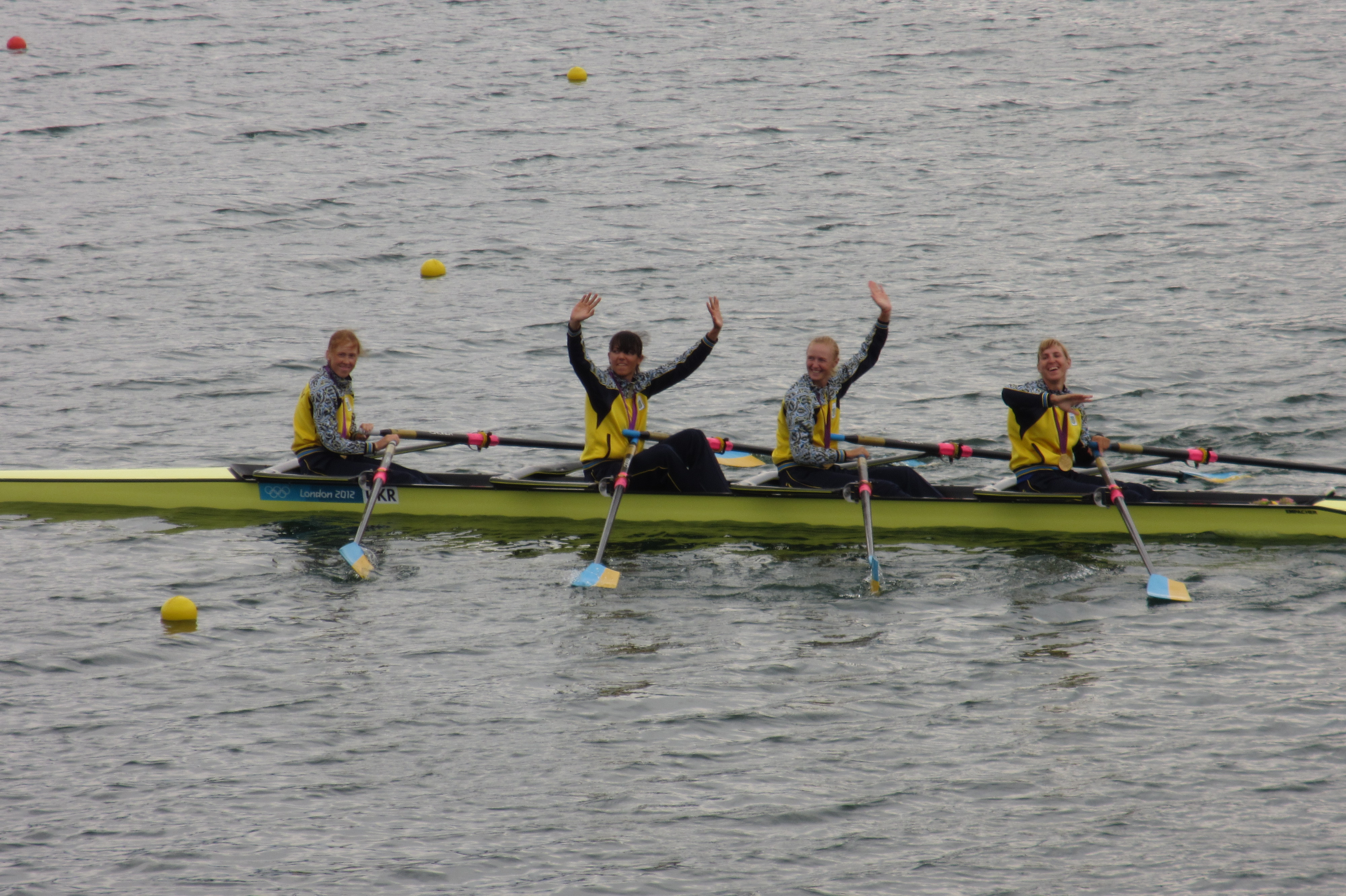
- Ukrainian team celebrating with their gold medals
- Venue: Eton Dorney
- Date: 28 July – 3 August 2012
- Competitors: 32 from 8 nations
- Winning time: 6:35.93

Medalists
1st place, gold medalist(s)		Kateryna Tarasenko; Nataliya Dovhodko; Anastasiya Kozhenkova; Yana Dementyeva	Ukraine
2nd place, silver medalist(s)		Annekatrin Thiele; Carina Bär; Julia Richter; Britta Oppelt	Germany
3rd place, bronze medalist(s)		Natalie Dell; Kara Kohler; Megan Kalmoe; Adrienne Martelli	United States

The Women's quadruple sculls competition at the 2012 Summer Olympics in London took place are at Dorney Lake which, for the purposes of the Games venue, is officially termed Eton Dorney.

== Schedule ==
All times are British Summer Time (UTC+1)

Date	Time	Round
Saturday, 28 July 2012	09:50	Heats
Monday, 30 July 2012	09:40	Repechage
Wednesday, 1 August 2012	10:20	Final B
Wednesday, 1 August 2012	12:10	Final

== Results ==
=== Heats ===
First team of each heat qualify to the final, remainder goes to the repechage.

==== Heat 1 ====
Rank	Rowers	Country	Time	Notes
1	Thiele, Bär, Richter, Oppelt	Germany	6:13.62	Q
2	Dell, Kohler, Kalmoe, Martelli	United States	6:15.76	R
3	Soćko, Leszczyńska, Lewandowska, Madaj	Poland	6:21.44	R
4	Tang, Tian, Jin, Zhang	China	6:24.32	R

==== Heat 2 ====
Rank	Rowers	Country	Time	Notes
1	Kateryna Tarasenko, Nataliya Dovhodko, Anastasiya Kozhenkova, Yana Dementyeva	Ukraine	6:14.82	Q
2	Faletic, Hore, Frasca, Clay	Australia	6:17.52	R
3	Gray, Trappitt, Bourke, Macfarlane	New Zealand	6:20.22	R
4	Wilson, Flood, Houghton, Rodford	Great Britain	6:20.71	R

=== Repechage ===
First four qualify to the final.

Rank	Rowers	Country	Time	Notes
1	Faletic, Hore, Frasca, Clay	Australia	6:18.80	Q
2	Dell, Kohler, Kalmoe, Martelli	United States	6:19.49	Q
3	Wilson, Flood, Houghton, Rodford	Great Britain	6:21.65	Q
4	Tang, Tian, Jin, Zhang	China	6:21.98	Q
5	Soćko, Leszczyńska, Lewandowska, Madaj	Poland	6:23.19	
6	Gray, Trappitt, Bourke, Macfarlane	New Zealand	6:48.71	"caught a crab"

=== Finals ===
Note: Strong headwinds

==== Final B ====
Rank	Rowers	Country	Time	Notes
1	Gray, Trappitt, Bourke, Macfarlane	New Zealand	6:56.46	
2	Soćko, Leszczyńska, Lewandowska, Madaj	Poland	6:57.20	

==== Final A ====
Rank	Rowers	Country	Time	Notes
1st place, gold medalist(s)	Kateryna Tarasenko, Nataliya Dovhodko, Anastasiya Kozhenkova, Yana Dementyeva	Ukraine	6:35.93	
2nd place, silver medalist(s)	Annekatrin Thiele, Carina Bär, Julia Richter, Britta Oppelt	Germany	6:38.09	
3rd place, bronze medalist(s)	Natalie Dell, Kara Kohler, Megan Kalmoe, Adrienne Martelli	United States	6:40.63	
4	Faletic, Hore, Frasca, Clay	Australia	6:41.67	
5	Tang, Tian, Jin, Zhang	China	6:44.19	
6	Wilson, Flood, Houghton, Rodford	Great Britain	6:51.54	
