= Natalie Dell =

American rower

Medal record

Women's rowing

Representing United States

Olympic Games
Bronze medal – third place	2012 London	Quadruple sculls

World Rowing Championships
Silver medal – second place	2011 Bled	Quadruple sculls

Natalie Dell O'Brien (born February 20, 1985), formerly known as Natalie Dell, is an American female crew rower. She won the bronze medal at the 2012 Summer Olympics in the quadruple sculls event. Natalie won a silver medal at the 2011 World Rowing Championships in Bled, Slovenia in the Women's quadruple sculls event. She is a three-time American national team member.

Born in Silver Spring, Maryland, she graduated from Everett High School in Everett, Pennsylvania. She attended the Pennsylvania State University from 2003–2007, where she learned to row as a walk-on to the university's club rowing team. She attended Boston University for graduate school and trained at the Riverside Boat Club from 2007–2010 until she was named as a Team USA member in September 2010.

== See also ==
- List of Pennsylvania State University Olympians
