= Sarah Gray =

New Zealand rower

Personal information
- Born: 28 October 1990 (age 36) New Zealand
Medal record
Women's rowing
Representing New Zealand
World Championships
Bronze medal – third place	2011 Bled	W4x

Sarah Gray (born 28 October 1990, Cambridge, New Zealand) is a New Zealand rower.

Under national coach Dick Tonks, Gray was placed in a women's quadruple scull with Fiona Bourke, Eve MacFarlane, and Louise Trappitt. They surprised themselves by winning bronze at the regattas in Hamburg (Germany) and Lucerne (Switzerland). They maintained their form and won a bronze at the 2011 World Rowing Championships at Lake Bled in Bled, Slovenia.

At the 2012 Summer Olympics, she competed in the women's quadruple sculls.

She is also an equine veterinarian at the University of California's William R. Pritchard Veterinary Medical Teaching Hospital in Davis. There, among her patients, she successfully treated a Western Classic Barrel racing champion for extensive lacerations, and aided his return to top form. Her work with horses has been featured in literary works like Equine ER: Stories from a Year in the Life of an Equine Veterinary Hospital by Leslie Guttman.
