= Louise Trappitt =

New Zealand rower

Personal information
- Nationality: New Zealand
- Born: 15 October 1985 (age 41)
- Height: 175 cm (5 ft 9 in)
- Weight: 68 kg (150 lb)
Medal record
Women's rowing
Representing New Zealand
World Championships
Bronze medal – third place	2011 Bled	W4x
Bronze medal – third place	2014 Amsterdam	W2−

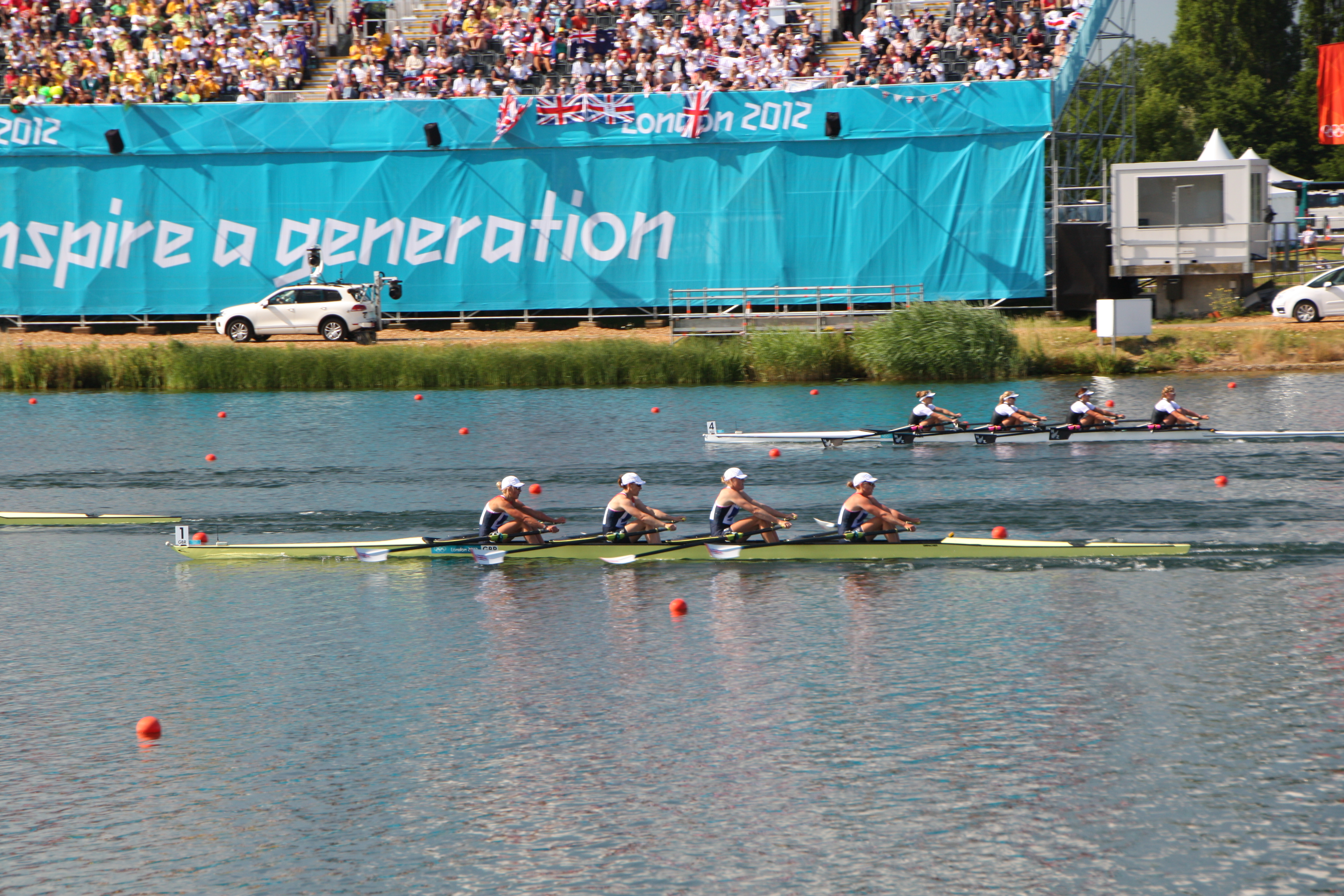
Trappitt competed at the 2012 Summer Olympics (on the right boat, second from left to right)

Louise Trappitt (born 15 October 1985) is a New Zealand rower. She has won bronze medals at World Rowing Championships in the women's quadruple scull in 2011, and in the women's pair in 2014.

== Family and private life ==
Trappitt was born in 1985 in Dunedin, but raised in Wellington. She holds a degree in physical education from the University of Otago (2004–2007), and later studied extramurally post graduate studies in rehabilitation through the same university (2010–2012). Trappitt did her undergraduate degree before she started concentrating on rowing. She now lives in Cambridge and is married to Olympic rower John Storey.

== Rowing career ==
National coach Dick Tonks placed her in a women's quadruple scull for the 2011 season, together with Sarah Gray, Fiona Bourke and Eve MacFarlane. The four surprised themselves by winning bronze at the regattas in Hamburg (Germany) and Lucerne (Switzerland). They maintained their form and won a bronze at the 2011 World Rowing Championships at Lake Bled in Bled, Slovenia.

In 2012, Trappitt competed with the women's quad at regattas in Lucerne (Switzerland; fourth place) and Munich (Germany; fifth place). The quad then went to the 2012 Summer Olympics in London with a strong expectation for a medal when Trappitt "caught a crab" and snapped an oar at the 1500 m mark in the repechage. This cost the team their place in the final (they would have had to be within the first four but came last in the repechage), and they subsequently came first in the B final. Trappitt took the 2013 rowing season off.

At the 2014 World Rowing Championships held at Bosbaan in Amsterdam, the Netherlands, Trappitt won a bronze medal in the women's pair partnering with Rebecca Scown.
