= Magdalena Fularczyk =

Polish rower

Magdalena Fularczyk-Kozłowska
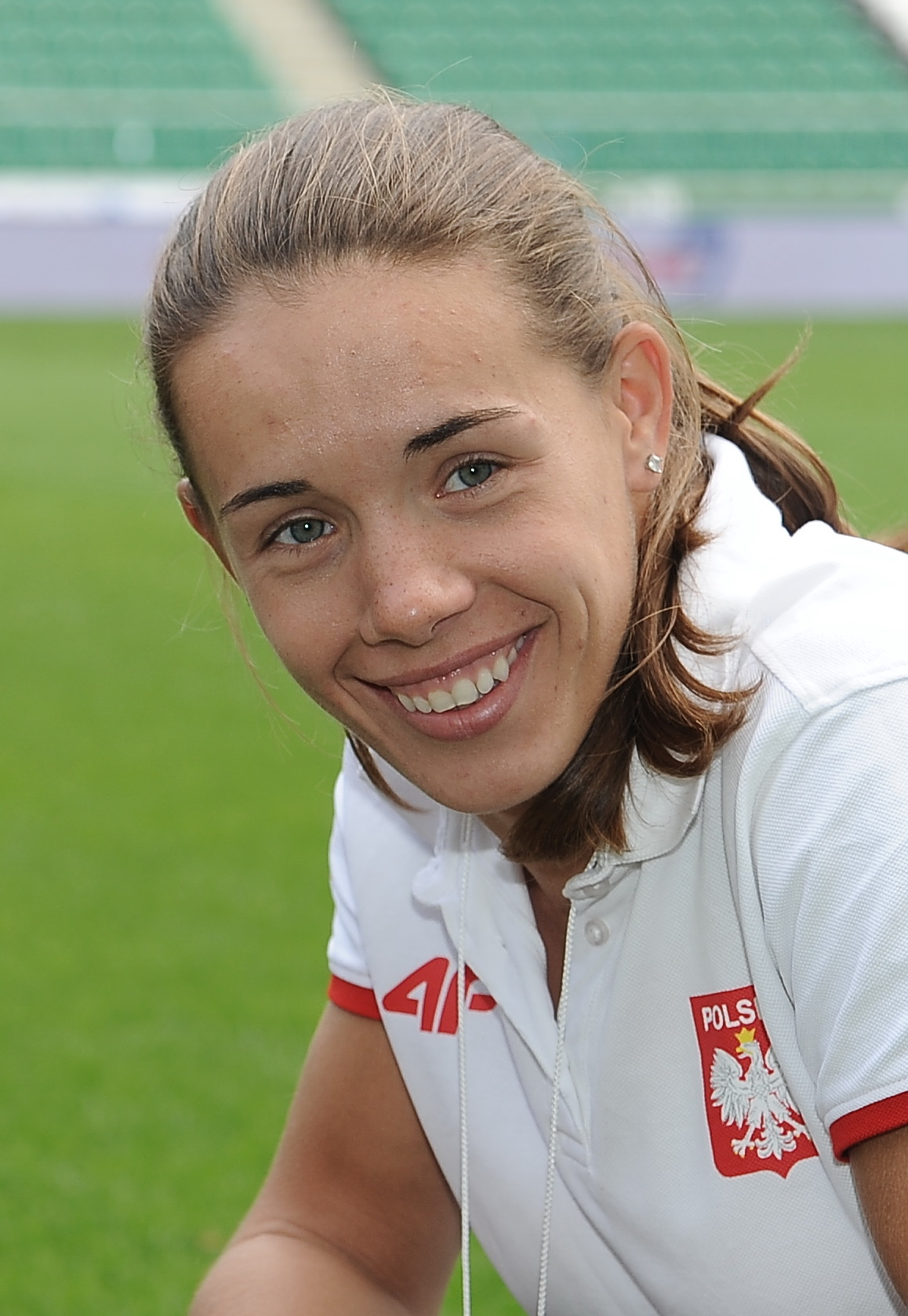

Personal information
- National team: Poland
- Born: 16 September 1986 (age 39) Wąbrzeźno, Kujawsko-Pomorskie, Poland
- Height: 173 cm (5 ft 8 in)
- Weight: 72 kg (159 lb)

Sport
- Sport: Rowing
- Club: RTW Lotto Bydgostia
Medal record
Women's rowing
Representing Poland
Event	1st	2nd	3rd
Olympic Games	1	0	1
World Championships	1	1	2
European Championships	2	4	0
Total	4	5	3
Olympic Games
Gold medal – first place	2016 Rio de Janeiro	Double sculls
Bronze medal – third place	2012 London	Double sculls
World Championships
Gold medal – first place	2009 Poznań	W2x
Silver medal – second place	2014 Amsterdam	W2x
Bronze medal – third place	2010 Karapiro	W2x
Bronze medal – third place	2013 Chungjiu	W4x
European Championships
Gold medal – first place	2014 Belgrade	W2x
Gold medal – first place	2015 Poznan	W2x
Silver medal – second place	2008 Athens	W2x
Silver medal – second place	2010 Montemor-o-Velho	W2x
Silver medal – second place	2011 Plovdiv	W4x
Silver medal – second place	2013 Sevilla	W2x

Magdalena Fularczyk-Kozłowska (Polish pronunciation: [maɡdaˈlɛna fularˈt͡ʂɨk kɔzˈwɔfska]; born 16 September 1986) is a Polish rower. She is the 2016 Olympic double sculls champion with rowing partner Natalia Madaj. From 2009 to 2012, she rowed with Julia Michalska.

== Career ==
Fularczyk took up rowing after the persistent encouragement of one of her schoolteachers. At national level, she was initially coached by Martin Witkowski. Her first international success came at the 2002 Junior World Rowing Championships, where she and teammate Patrycja Pytel won the silver medal. With Kamila Socko, she won the bronze medal at the 2007 U-23 World Championships.

At the 2008 European Championships, she and Natalia Madaj won the silver medal in the double sculls; it was Fularczyk's first senior medal. She then teamed up with Julia Michalska.

When she won the gold medal at the 2009 World Championships with Julia Michalska, she was part of the first female Polish team to win a World Championship gold in an Olympic boat class. Because of her achievements at the World Championships, Fularczyk was awarded the Knight's Cross of the Order of Polonia Restituta.

Fularczyk's preparation for the 2012 Summer Olympics was disrupted by a family tragedy and injury, but the team of Fularczyk and Michalska still won the bronze medal. After this event, she returned to sculling with Madaj.

She also has a World Championship medal in the women's quadruple sculls (from the 2013 World Championships), with Sylwia Lewandowska, Joanna Leszczynska and Natalia Madaj.

As well as her international titles, she has also won four Polish national championships (single sculls 2009, double sculls 2006, 2007 and 2009, all with Julia Michalska).

At 2016 Summer Olympics Fularczyk-Kozłowska won her second Olympic and first gold medal in women's double sculls, in partnership with Natalia Madaj.

== See also ==
- Poland at the 2016 Summer Olympics
