= Lisa Schmidla =

German rower

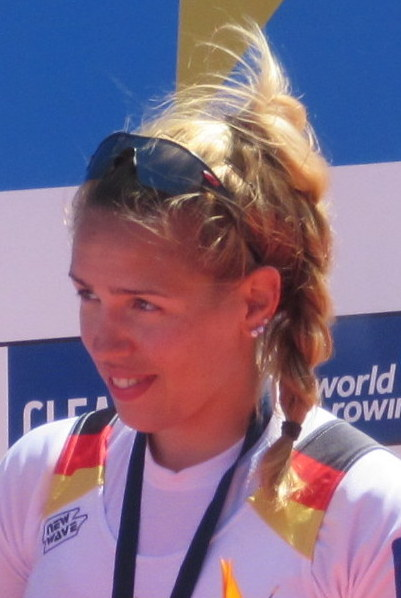
Medal record
Women's rowing
Representing Germany
Olympic Games
Gold medal – first place	2016 Rio de Janeiro	Quadruple sculls
World Championships
Gold medal – first place	2014 Amsterdam	Quadruple sculls
Silver medal – second place	2015 Aiguebelette	Quadruple sculls
World U23 Championships
Gold medal – first place	2010 Brest	Double sculls
Gold medal – first place	2011 Amsterdam	Quadruple sculls
Gold medal – first place	2013 Linz	Single sculls

Lisa Schmidla (born 5 June 1991, in Krefeld) is a German rower. She won a total of three gold medals at the World U23 Championships. At the 2016 Summer Olympics in Rio de Janeiro, she competed in women's quadruple sculls competition in which the German team won the gold medal.
