= Kateryna Tarasenko =

Ukrainian rower

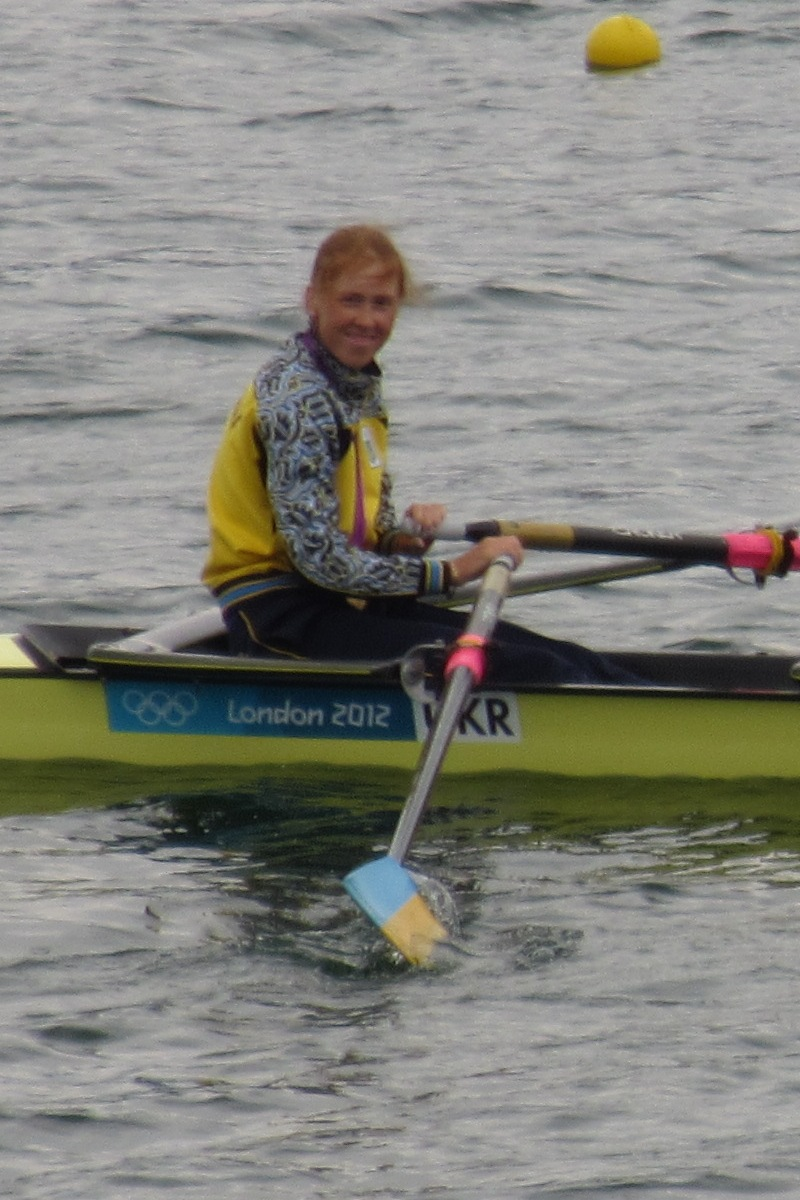
- Tarasenko in 2012

Medal record

Women's rowing

Representing Ukraine

Olympic Games
Gold medal – first place	2012 London	W4x

World Rowing Championships
Silver medal – second place	2010 Karapiro	W4x

European Rowing Championships
Gold medal – first place	2008 Marathon	W2x
Gold medal – first place	2010 Montemor-o-Velho	W4x
Gold medal – first place	2011 Plovdiv	W4x
Bronze medal – third place	2009 Brest	W8x

Kateryna Tarasenko (Ukrainian: Катерина Тарасенко; born 6 August 1987 in Dnipropetrovsk) is a Ukrainian rower. Along with Yana Dementyeva, she finished 7th in the women's double sculls at the 2008 Summer Olympics. Both of them won a gold medal at the 2012 Summer Olympics in the quadruple sculls event with Nataliya Dovgodko and Anastasiya Kozhenkova.

Tarasenko received Order of Merit in 2012.

Tarasenko is married to Ivan Futryk, an academic rower and European championship winner. They have two children.
