= Nataliya Dovhodko =

Ukrainian rower (born 1991)

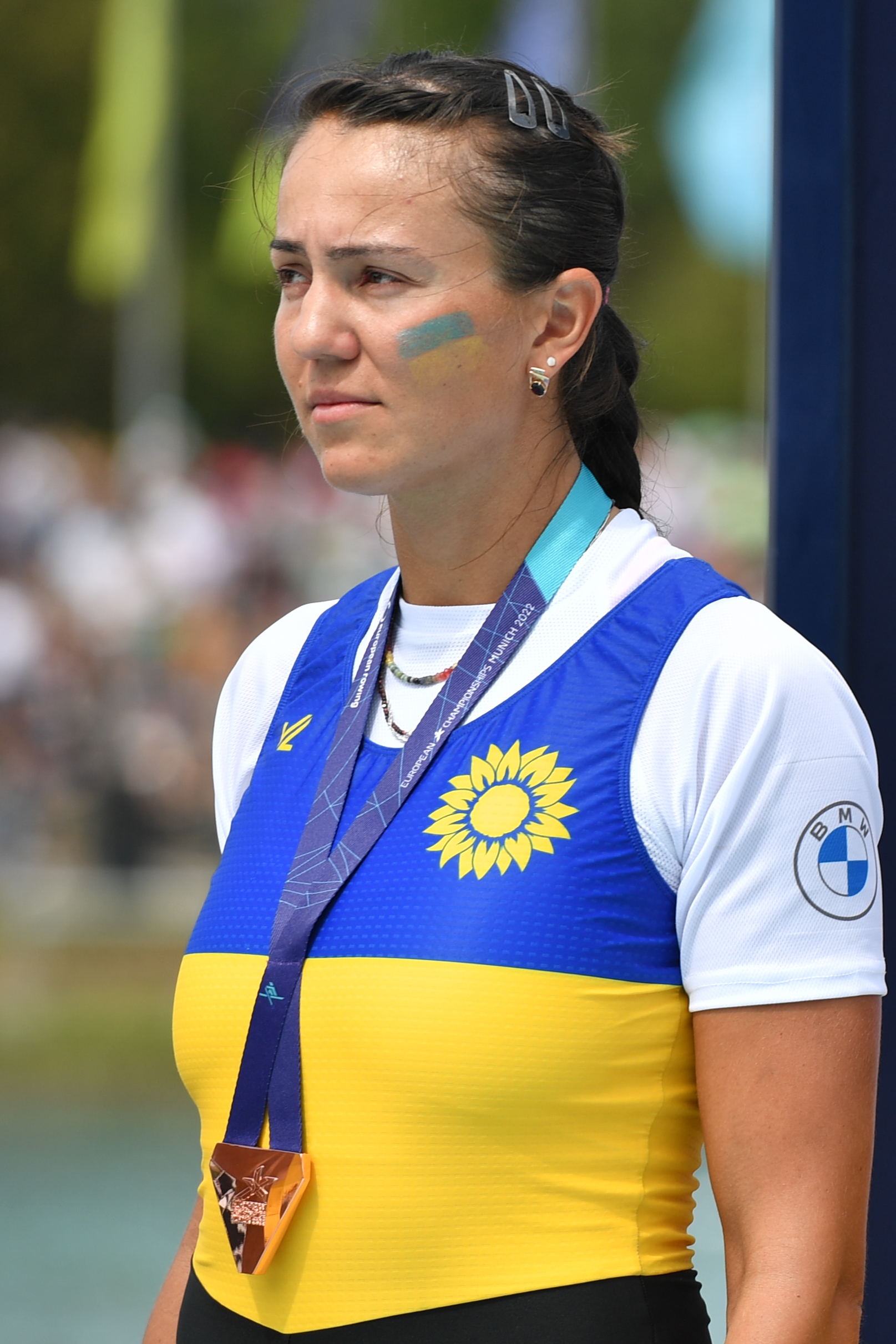
- Dovhodko in 2022

Medal record

Women's rowing

Representing Ukraine

Olympic Games
Gold medal – first place	2012 London	Quadruple sculls

European Championships
Gold medal – first place	2012 Varese	Quadruple sculls
Gold medal – first place	2023 Bled	Quadruple sculls
Silver medal – second place	2024 Szeged	Quadruple sculls
Bronze medal – third place	2022 Oberschleißheim	Quadruple sculls

Universiade
Gold medal – first place	2013 Kazan	Single sculls
Gold medal – first place	2015 Gwangju	Coxless four
Silver medal – second place	2015 Gwangju	Single sculls

Nataliya Dovhodko (Ukrainian: Наталія Довгодько; born 7 February 1991 in Kyiv) is a Ukrainian female crew rower. She won a gold medal at the 2012 Summer Olympics in the quadruple sculls event with Kateryna Tarasenko, Anastasiya Kozhenkova, and Yana Dementyeva. Dovhodko was recognised the Merited Master of Sports for her 2012 Olympic feat. That year, the team of Dovhodko, Tarasenko, Olga Hurkovska and Dementyeva also won the gold medal at the European Championships.

She represented the Central Sports Club of the Armed Forces of Ukraine (CSK ZSU).
