= Annekatrin Thiele =

German rower (born 1984)

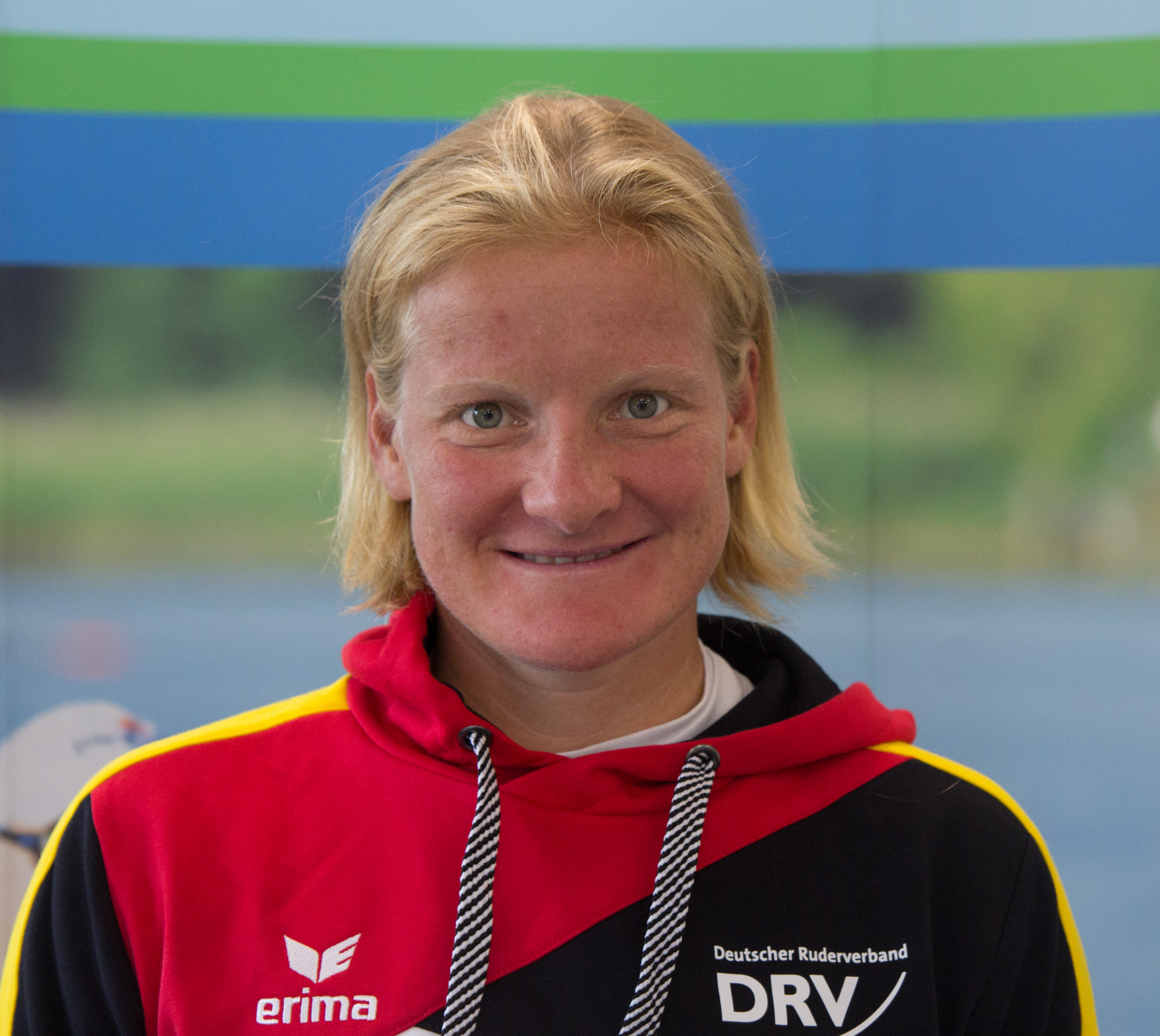
Medal record
Women's rowing
Representing Germany
Olympic Games
| Gold medal – first place | 2016 Rio de Janeiro | Quadruple sculls |
| Silver medal – second place | 2008 Beijing | Double sculls |
| Silver medal – second place | 2012 London | Quadruple sculls |
World Championships
| Gold medal – first place | 2013 Chungjiu | W4x |
| Gold medal – first place | 2014 Amsterdam | W4x |
| Silver medal – second place | 2015 Aiguebelette | W4x |

Annekatrin Thiele (born 18 October 1984 in Sangerhausen) is a German rower, who competed at three Olympic Games.

== Biography ==
Thiele competed at the 2008 Summer Olympics, where she won a silver medal in double sculls with Christiane Huth. At the 2012 Summer Olympics, she again won a silver medal, this time in the women's quadruple sculls. She has also twice won World Championship gold, both times in the women's quadruple sculls. At the 2016 Summer Olympics in Rio de Janeiro she competed in women's quadruple sculls competition in which the German team won the gold medal.

In 2017, Thiele won the Princess Royal Challenge Cup (the premier women's singles sculls event) at the Henley Royal Regatta, rowing for SC DHfK Leipzig e.V. She studied sports science at Leipzig University, and after retirement worked as a control officer and sports director in Leipzig.
