= Wang Yuwei =

Chinese rower

Personal information
- Born: 16 July 1991 (age 35) Hulunbeier, China

Sport
- Sport: Rowing
Medal record
Women's rowing
Representing China
Olympic Games
Bronze medal – third place	2020 Tokyo	Eight

Wang Yuwei (born 16 July 1991) is a Chinese rower. She competed in the women's quadruple sculls event at the 2016 Summer Olympics.
