= Madeleine Edmunds =

Australian rower

Personal information
- Nationality: Australian
- Born: 3 January 1992 (age 34)

Sport
- Sport: Rowing
- Club: Commercial Rowing Club
Medal record
Women's rowing
Representing Australia
World Championships
Bronze medal – third place	2017 Sarasota	Double sculls

Madeleine Edmunds (born 3 January 1992) is an Australian rower. She is a five-time national champion and a 2016 Olympian.

== Club and state rowing ==
Raised in Brisbane, Edmunds' is the daughter of 1984 Olympic bronze medal winning rower Ian Edmunds. Madeleine was educated at St Margaret's Anglican Girls School at Ascot and her senior rowing has been from the Commercial Rowing Club in Brisbane.

Edmunds' first state representative selection came at aged sixteen in 2008 in the Queensland youth eight who contested and won the Bicentennial Cup at the Interstate Regatta within the Australian Rowing Championships. In 2009, 2010 and 2011 Edmunds made three further appearances in the Queensland youth eight for three further wins. On six occasions from 2012 to 2018 Edmunds was selected in Queensland senior women's eights competing for the Queen's Cup at the Interstate Regatta. In 2018 she was Queensland's representative contesting and winning the interstate single-sculls championship for the Nell Slatter Trophy.

In 2017 in Commercial colours she won the national double scull title at the Australian Rowing Championships with Olympia Aldersey. In 2018 crewed a composite Australian selection eight which won the women's eight title at the Australian Rowing Championships.

== International representative rowing ==
Edmunds first represented Australia aged sixteen at the 2008 Junior World Rowing Championships in Linz, Austria in a coxless pair which placed seventh. The following year at the Junior World Rowing Championships in 2009 in Brive-La Gaillarde, Edmunds won a silver medal in a quad scull. She again rowed at Junior World Championships in 2010 placing fourth in a double scull at Racice with Jessica Hall.

In 2011 she stepped up to the U23 representative level and contested the World Rowing U23 Championships in Amsterdam finishing in ninth place as Australia's single sculls representative. In 2012 at the U23 World Championships in Trakai she won gold in Australia's quad scull with Hall, Olympia Aldersey and Rebekah Cooper. That same quad stayed together as a senior crew in 2013. They raced in three World Rowing Cups that year and then went to the 2013 World Rowing Championships in Chungju, Korea where they bowed out in the repechage. With Aldersey and Cooper changed out for Kerry Hore and Jennifer Cleary they contested two World Rowing Cups and they placed fourth at the 2014 World Rowing Championships. Edmunds moved to the stroke seat of that same crew in 2015 and they again went to World Championships - Aiguebelette 2015, and placed fifth.

That crew carried on together into the 2016 Olympic year, rowing at two World Rowing Cups in Europe in the lead-up (and winning a silver medal) before contesting the women's quadruple sculls event at Rio 2016. They made a shock exit from the games in the repechage finishing fifth in a tightly fought race and missing out on a spot in the A-Final. The crew powered out from the start up against crews from Netherlands, Poland, Australia, USA and China. With Poland and the Netherlands taking the lead it was a battle between the rest for the remaining two spots in A Final. As they approached the final 500 m, they upped their rate but as did the USA and China and with 100 metres to go the three crews were bow ball to bow ball, and so close at the finish it resulted in a photo to decide who would join Poland and the Netherlands in the A-Final. The photos showed that Australia had finished fifth, a mere 0.06 seconds behind China, and 0.11 seconds behind USA, who'd nabbed the final two qualification spots. A visibly distraught crew spoke to the media post-race. "Yes we are pretty devastated, we threw everything at it, with the field so good in this event in particular, and at the Olympic Games, and all it took was a few strokes, that weren’t as good as we can produce, for the result to happen", said Hall.

Edmunds continued to row at the highest world level into 2017 but moved into a double scull with Olympia Aldersey. They contested two World Rowing Cups in Europe before finally, Edmunds won a senior world championship medal - a bronze - at the 2017 World Rowing Championships in Sarasota, Florida. In 2018 at the World Rowing Cup II in Linz, Edmunds was Australia's entrant for the women's single scull and placed fifth. At the 2018 Henley Royal Regatta Edmunds was the runner-up to Jeannine Gmelin of Switzerland in the Princess Royal Challenge Cup for the women's single scull.
