= Adrienne Martelli =

American rower

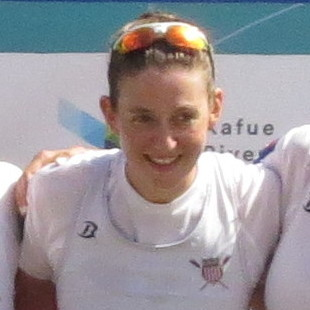
- Martelli in 2015 at Aiguebelette

Personal information
- Full name: Adrienne Elisabeth Martelli
- Born: December 3, 1987 (age 38) Glendale, California, U.S.
Medal record
Women's rowing
Representing the United States
Olympic Games
Bronze medal – third place	2012 London	Quadruple sculls
World Championships
Gold medal – first place	2015 Aiguebelette	W4−
Silver medal – second place	2014 Amsterdam	W4−
Bronze medal – third place	2010 Karapiro	W4-

Adrienne Elizabeth Martelli (born December 3, 1987) is an American female crew rower from University Place, Washington. She took an Olympic bronze medal in 2012 and a gold medal in the 2015 World Championships.

== Early life ==
Born in Glendale, California, Martelli graduated from Curtis Senior High School in University Place, Washington, and the University of Washington.

== Rowing career ==
Martelli won a bronze medal at the 2012 Summer Olympics in the quadruple sculls event.

In 2015 Martelli, Kristine O'Brien, Grace Latz and Grace Luczak took the gold medal at the 2015 – World Championships.

== Coaching career ==
Martelli became an assistant rowing coach for Northeastern Huskies in 2016, and the California Golden Bears in 2020. She was then hired as the head rowing coach for the Clemson Tigers in 2024.

== Personal life ==
She is married to her husband Joe Mallen.
