= Jessica Hall (rower) =

Australian rower (born 1992)

Personal information
- Born: 13 July 1992 (age 33)

Sport
- Sport: Rowing
Medal record
Women's Rowing
Representing Australia
U23 World Championships
Gold medal – first place	2012 U23 Trakai	W4x
Bronze medal – third place	2011 U23 Amsterdam	W4x
Junior World Championships
Silver medal – second place	2009 U23 Brive-La Gaillarde	W4x

Jessica Hall (born 13 July 1992) is an Australian rower. She competed in the women's quadruple sculls event at the 2016 Summer Olympics. She is a former U23 World Champion and World Record Holder in the Quad Sculls in 2012.

== Club and state rowing ==
Raised in Corinda, Queensland, Hall's senior rowing career has stemmed from the Brisbane and GPS Rowing Club.

Hall's first state representative selection came at aged sixteen in 2009 in the Queensland youth eight who contested and won the Bicentennial Cup at the Interstate Regatta within the Australian Rowing Championships. In 2010 and 2011 Edmunds made further appearances in the Queensland youth eight for two further wins. On six occasions from 2012 to 2017 Hall was selected in Queensland senior women's eights competing for the Queen's Cup at the Interstate Regatta. She stroked those eights in 2013, 2014 and 2015

== International representative rowing ==
Hall made her Australian representative debut at the Junior World Rowing Championships in 2009 in Brive-La Gaillarde, where she won a silver medal in a quad scull. She again rowed at Junior World Championships in 2010 placing fourth in a double scull at Racice with Madeleine Edmunds. In 2011 Hall was in the Australian quad scull who won a bronze medal at the World Rowing U23 Championships in Amsterdam.

In 2012 at the World Rowing U23 Championships in Trakai she won gold in Australia's quad scull with Edmunds, Olympia Aldersey and Rebekah Cooper. That same quad stayed together as a senior crew in 2013. They raced in three World Rowing Cups that year and then went to the 2013 World Rowing Championships in Chungju, Korea where they bowed out in the repechage. With Aldersey and Cooper changed out for Kerry Hore and Jennifer Cleary they contested two World Rowing Cups and they placed fourth at the 2014 World Rowing Championships. Hall rowed in the bow seat of that same crew in 2015 and they again went to the World Championships - Aiguebelette 2015 and placed fifth.

That crew carried on together into the 2016 Olympic year, rowing at two World Rowing Cups in Europe in the lead-up (and winning a silver medal) before contesting the women's quadruple sculls event at Rio 2016. They made a shock exit from the games in the repechage finishing fifth in a tightly fought repechage and missing out on a spot in the A-Final. The crew powered out the start up against crews from Netherlands, Poland, USA and China. With Poland and the Netherlands taking the lead it was a battle between the rest for the remaining two spots in the A Final. As they approached the final 500 m, they upped their rate but as did the USA and China and with 100 metres to go the three crews were bow ball to bow ball, and so close at the finish it resulted in a photo to decide who would join Poland and the Netherlands in the A-Final. The photos showed that Australia had finished fifth, a mere 0.06 seconds behind China, and 0.11 seconds behind USA, who'd nabbed the final two qualification spots. A visibly distraught crew spoke to the media post-race. "Yes we are pretty devastated, we threw everything at it, with the field so good in this event in particular, and at the Olympic Games, and all it took was a few strokes, that weren’t as good as we can produce, for the result to happen", said Hall.
