= Jennifer Cleary =

Australian rower (born 1993)

Jennifer Bolland
Personal information
- Born: Jennifer Cleary; 22 June 1993 (age 33)
- Years active: 2009 - 2016

Sport
- Sport: Rowing
- Club: Mercantile Rowing Club

Jennifer Cleary (born 22 June 1993) is an Australian rower. She competed in the women's quadruple sculls event at the 2016 Summer Olympics.

== Club and state rowing ==
Raised in Victoria, Cleary took up school rowing at Geelong College. Her senior club rowing has been from the Mercantile Rowing Club in Melbourne.

Cleary's first state representative selection came in 2012 in the Victorian youth eight who contested the Bicentennial Cup at the Interstate Regatta within the Australian Rowing Championships. On four occasions from 2013 to 2017 Cleary was selected in Victoria's senior women's eights competing for the Queen's Cup at the Interstate Regatta. Those Victorian eights were victorious in 2013, 2015 and 2017. In 2014 she was Victoria's representative contesting and winning the interstate single-sculls championship for the Nell Slatter Trophy.

== International representative rowing ==
Cleary made her Australian representative debut at the World Rowing Cup I in Sydney in 2013 rowing in a double scull with Rebekah Hooper to a sixth placing. That year she competed at both the World Rowing U23 Championships in Linz in the Australian U23 eight and also at the 2013 World Rowing Championships in Chungju Korea where she was called into the Australian senior quad scull to race the B final when Madeleine Edmunds fell ill.

In 2014 Cleary and Kerry Hore joined Edmunds and Jessica Hall in the Australian quad scull. They contested two World Rowing Cups and they placed fourth at the 2014 World Rowing Championships. Cleary rowed in the two seat of that same crew in 2015 and they again went to World Championships - Aiguebelette 2015 and placed fifth.

That crew carried on together into the 2016 Olympic year, rowing at two World Rowing Cups in Europe in the lead-up (and winning a silver medal) before contesting the women's quadruple sculls event at Rio 2016. They made a shock exit from the games in the repechage finishing fifth in a tightly fought repechage and missing out on a spot in the A-Final. The crew powered out the start up against crews from Netherlands, Poland, Australia, USA and China. With Poland and the Netherlands taking the lead it was a battle between the rest for the remaining two spots in A Final. As they approached the final 500 m, they upped their rate but as did the USA and China and with 100 metres to go the three crews were bow ball to bow ball, and so close at the finish it resulted in a photo to decide who would join Poland and the Netherlands in the A-Final. The photos showed that Australia had finished fifth, a mere 0.06 seconds behind China, and 0.11 seconds behind USA, who'd nabbed the final two qualification spots. A visibly distraught crew spoke to the media post-race. "Yes we are pretty devastated, we threw everything at it, with the field so good in this event in particular, and at the Olympic Games, and all it took was a few strokes, that weren’t as good as we can produce, for the result to happen", said Hall.
