= Julia Lier =

German rower

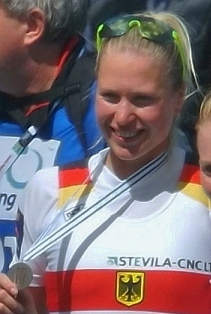

Personal information
- Born: 11 November 1991 (age 34) Ludwigsfelde, Germany
Medal record
Women's rowing
Representing Germany
Olympic Games
Gold medal – first place	2016 Rio de Janeiro	Quadruple sculls
World Championships
Gold medal – first place	2014 Amsterdam	Quadruple sculls
Bronze medal – third place	2015 Aiguebelette	Double sculls
European Championships
Gold medal – first place	2019 Lucerne	Quadruple sculls
Silver medal – second place	2014 Belgrade	Quadruple sculls
Silver medal – second place	2016 Brandenburg	Double sculls

Julia Lier (born 11 November 1991) is a German rower. She competed at the 2014 World Rowing Championships in Amsterdam winning a gold medal.

== Career ==
Before the 2016 Summer Olympics in Rio de Janeiro Lier posed together with swimmer Isabelle Härle, cyclist Nadja Pries, table tennis player Petrissa Solja, and not starting from injury reasons in Rio pole vaulter Katharina Bauer for the German edition of Playboy. In Rio, she won the gold medal.

On 9 January 2020 28-year-old Lier announced her retirement from competitive rowing as a result of a persistent rib injury which plagued her since November 2018 and didn't allow strenuous training sessions anymore. She partly blamed the German Rowing Federation (DRV), in particular the coach of the Berlin training base Marcin Witkowski, for aggravating her injury by not letting her reduce her training load and rejecting alternative training methods.
