= Yana Dementyeva =

Ukrainian rower

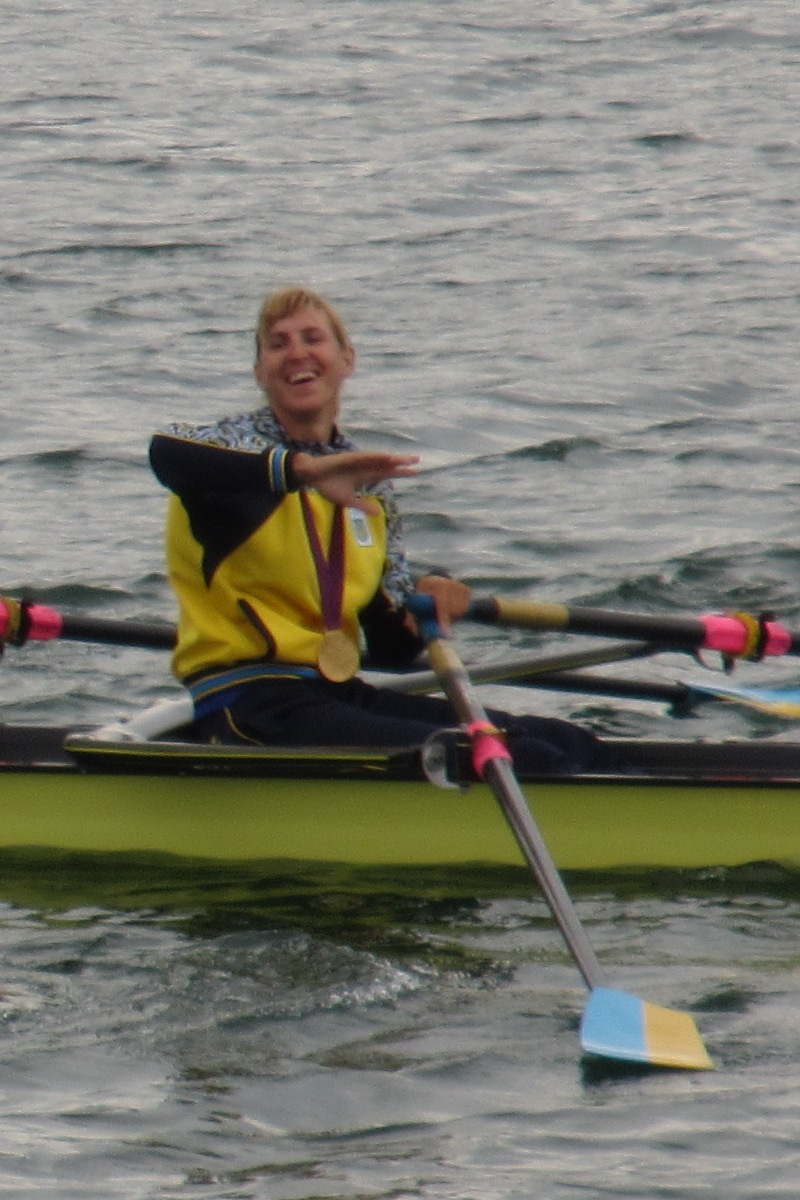
- Dementieva in 2012

Medal record

Women's rowing

Representing Ukraine

Olympic Games
Gold medal – first place	2012 London	Quadruple sculls
Disqualified	2004 Athens	Quadruple sculls

World Championships
Gold medal – first place	2009 Poznań	Quadruple sculls
Silver medal – second place	2010 Karapiro	Quadruple sculls

European Championships
Gold medal – first place	2008 Marathon	Double sculls
Gold medal – first place	2009 Brest	Quadruple sculls
Gold medal – first place	2010 Montemor-o-Velho	Quadruple sculls
Gold medal – first place	2011 Plovdiv	Double sculls
Gold medal – first place	2012 Varese	Quadruple sculls
Bronze medal – third place	2019 Lucerne	Quadruple sculls

Yana Mykhailivna Dementieva (Ukrainian: Яна Михайлівна Дементьєва; born 23 October 1978 in Kharkiv) is a Ukrainian rower. At the 2012 Summer Olympics Dementyeva won the gold medal in the quadruple sculls event with Kateryna Tarasenko, Anastasiya Kozhenkova and Nataliya Dovhodko. She is also a World and European champion in the quadruple sculls, as well as being a European champion in the double sculls.

At the 2004 Olympics, she was disqualified with her team after one of her teammates, Olena Olefirenko, tested positive for ethamivan. At the 2008 Summer Olympics, she reached the B final in the women's double sculls.
