= Zhang Xinyue =

Chinese rower (born 1993)

Personal information
- Born: 5 May 1993 (age 32) Shandong, China

Sport
- Sport: Rowing

Zhang Xinyue (born 5 May 1993) is a Chinese rower. She competed in the women's quadruple sculls event at the 2016 Summer Olympics.
