= Kamila Soćko =

Polish rower

Medal record

Women's rowing

Representing Poland

European Championships
Silver medal – second place	2012 Varese	W4x

Kamila Soćko (born 12 November 1988 in Warsaw) is a Polish rower. At the 2012 Summer Olympics, she competed in the Women's quadruple sculls.
