= Natalia Madaj =

Polish rower

Personal information
- Born: 25 January 1988 (age 38) Piła, Poland
Medal record
Women's rowing
Representing Poland
Event	1st	2nd	3rd
Olympic Games	1	0	0
World Championships	0	1	1
European Championships	2	4	1
Total	3	5	2
Olympic Games
Gold medal – first place	2016 Rio de Janeiro	Double sculls
World Championships
Silver medal – second place	2014 Amsterdam	W2x
Bronze medal – third place	2013 Chungjiu	W4x
European Championships
Gold medal – first place	2014 Belgrade	W2x
Gold medal – first place	2015 Poznań	W2x
Silver medal – second place	2008 Athens	W2x
Silver medal – second place	2011 Plovdiv	W4x
Silver medal – second place	2012 Varese	W4x
Silver medal – second place	2013 Sevilla	W2x
Bronze medal – third place	2009 Brest	W2x

Natalia Madaj (Polish pronunciation: [naˈtalja ˈmadaj]; born 25 January 1988) is a Polish rower. At the 2012 Summer Olympics, she finished 8th in the women's quadruple sculls. At 2016 Summer Olympics Madaj won her first gold medal in women's double sculls, competing in partnership with Magdalena Fularczyk.

== See also ==
- Poland at the 2016 Summer Olympics
