= Anastasiya Kozhenkova =

Ukrainian rower (born 1986)

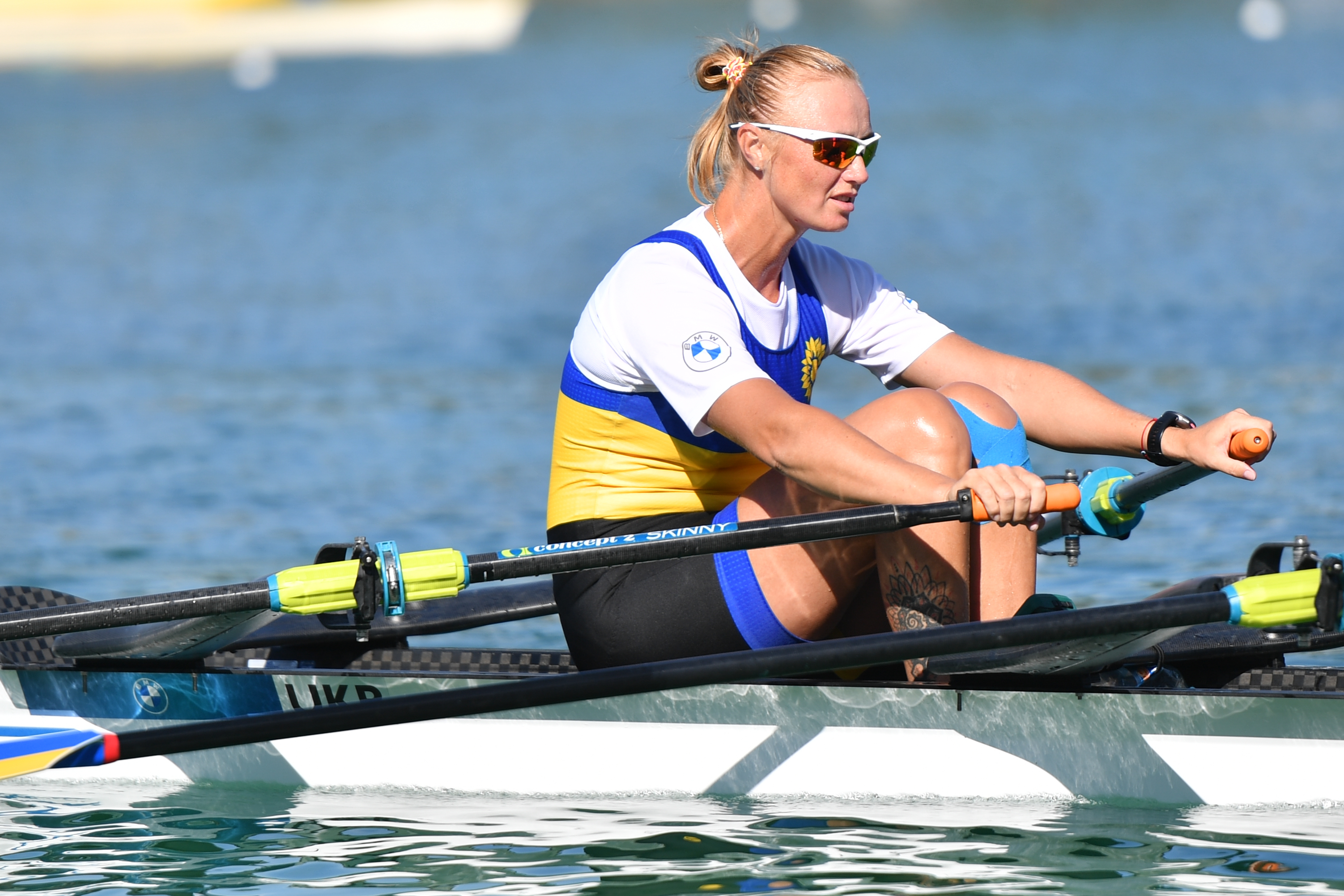
- Kozhenkova in 2022

Personal information
- Nationality: Ukrainian
- Born: 19 January 1986 (age 40) Kovel, Volyn Oblast, Ukrainian SSR, Soviet Union
- Height: 186 cm (6 ft 1 in)
- Weight: 75 kg (165 lb)
Medal record
Women's rowing
Representing Ukraine
Olympic Games
Gold medal – first place	2012 London	Quadruple sculls
World Championships
Gold medal – first place	2009 Poznań	Quadruple sculls
Silver medal – second place	2010 Cambridge	Quadruple sculls
European Championships
Gold medal – first place	2009 Brest	Quadruple sculls
Gold medal – first place	2010 Montemor-o-Velho	Quadruple sculls
Gold medal – first place	2011 Plovdiv	Double sculls
Gold medal – first place	2023 Bled	Quadruple sculls
Silver medal – second place	2018 Glasgow	Quadruple sculls
Silver medal – second place	2024 Szeged	Quadruple sculls
Bronze medal – third place	2016 Brandenburg an der Havel	Quadruple sculls
Bronze medal – third place	2019 Lucerne	Quadruple sculls

Anastasiya Kozhenkova (Ukrainian: Анастасія Коженкова; born 19 January 1986 in Kovel, Volyn Oblast) is a Ukrainian rower. She won a gold medal at the 2012 Summer Olympics in the quadruple sculls event with Kateryna Tarasenko, Nataliya Dovhodko, and Yana Dementyeva.
