= Fiona Bourke =

New Zealand rower

Personal information
- Born: 16 October 1988 (age 37)
Medal record
Women's rowing
Representing New Zealand
World Championships
Gold medal – first place	2014 Amsterdam	W2x
Silver medal – second place	2013 Chungju	W2x
Bronze medal – third place	2011 Bled	W4x

Fiona Bourke (born 16 October 1988, Dannevirke) is a New Zealand rower. She won the 2014 World Championship in the women's double sculls with Zoe Stevenson, having won the silver medal in the same team the year before. At the 2012 Summer Olympics, she competed in the Women's quadruple sculls. She was also part of the New Zealand women's quadruple sculls team that won bronze at the 2011 World Championships. Bourke only took up rowing when she started university in 2007, at the University of Otago.
