= 2019 World Rowing Championships – Women's double sculls =

Women's double sculls at the 2019 World Rowing Championships
- Venue: Linz-Ottensheim
- Location: Ottensheim, Austria
- Dates: 26 August – 1 September
- Competitors: 42 from 21 nations
- Winning time: 6:47.17

Medalists
gold medal	Brooke Donoghue; Olivia Loe	New Zealand
silver medal	Nicoleta-Ancuţa Bodnar; Simona Radiș	Romania
bronze medal	Roos de Jong; Lisa Scheenaard	Netherlands

The women's double sculls competition at the 2019 World Rowing Championships took place at the Linz-Ottensheim regatta venue. A top-eleven finish ensured qualification for the Tokyo Olympics.

== Schedule ==
The schedule was as follows:

Date	Time	Round
Monday 26 August 2019	10:56	Heats
Wednesday 28 August 2019	15:30	Repechages
Thursday 29 August 2019	15:50	Semifinals C/D
Friday 30 August 2019	12:00	Semifinals A/B
Saturday 31 August 2019	09:48	Final D
Sunday 1 September 2019	10:56	Final C
Sunday 1 September 2019	11:54	Final B
Sunday 1 September 2019	13:40	Final A

All times are Central European Summer Time (UTC+2)

== Results ==
=== Heats ===
Heat winners advanced directly to the A/B semifinals. The remaining boats were sent to the repechages.

==== Heat 1 ====
Rank	Rowers	Country	Time	Notes
1	Roos de Jong; Lisa Scheenaard	Netherlands	6:58.53	SA/B
2	Nicoleta-Ancuţa Bodnar; Simona Radiș	Romania	6:59.85	R
3	Tatsiana Klimovich; Krystsina Staraselets	Belarus	7:04.32	R
4	Leonie Menzel; Pia Greiten	Germany	7:06.04	R
5	Martyna Radosz; Krystyna Lemańczyk-Dobrzelak	Poland	7:09.07	R
6	Aspasia Christodoulidis; Anneta Kyridou	Greece	7:32.75	R

==== Heat 2 ====
Rank	Rowers	Country	Time	Notes
1	Amanda Bateman; Genevieve Horton	Australia	7:00.21	SA/B
2	Hélène Lefebvre; Élodie Ravera-Scaramozzino	France	7:01.55	R
3	Lu Shiyu; Wang Yuwei	China	7:03.77	R
4	Ruth Siddorn; Kyra Edwards	Great Britain	7:11.07	R
5	Vivien Preil; Zoltana Gadanyi	Hungary	7:40.40	R

==== Heat 3 ====
Rank	Rowers	Country	Time	Notes
1	Brooke Donoghue; Olivia Loe	New Zealand	7:03.15	SA/B
2	Lenka Antošová; Kristýna Fleissnerová	Czech Republic	7:08.95	R
3	Milica Slijepčević; Jovana Arsić	Serbia	7:14.03	R
4	Aimee Hernandez; Yariulvis Cobas	Cuba	7:19.30	R
5	Pascale Walker; Sofia Meakin	Switzerland	7:22.22	R

==== Heat 4 ====
Rank	Rowers	Country	Time	Notes
1	Cicely Madden; Genevra Stone	United States	6:56.36	SA/B
2	Gabrielle Smith; Andrea Proske	Canada	6:58.63	R
3	Stefania Buttignon; Stefania Gobbi	Italy	7:01.22	R
4	Milda Valčiukaitė; Ieva Adomavičiūtė	Lithuania	7:02.85	R
5	Daryna Verkhohliad; Nataliya Dovhodko	Ukraine	7:20.58	R

=== Repechages ===
The two fastest boats in each repechage advanced to the A/B semifinals. The remaining boats were sent to the C/D semifinals.

==== Repechage 1 ====
Rank	Rowers	Country	Time	Notes
1	Nicoleta-Ancuţa Bodnar; Simona Radiș	Romania	6:56.41	SA/B
2	Lu Shiyu; Wang Yuwei	China	6:58.43	SA/B
3	Daryna Verkhohliad; Nataliya Dovhodko	Ukraine	7:08.48	SC/D
4	Aspasia Christodoulidis; Anneta Kyridou	Greece	7:11.44	SC/D
5	Aimee Hernandez; Yariulvis Cobas	Cuba	7:15.28	SC/D

==== Repechage 2 ====
Rank	Rowers	Country	Time	Notes
1	Milda Valčiukaitė; Ieva Adomavičiūtė	Lithuania	6:56.41	SA/B
2	Hélène Lefebvre; Élodie Ravera-Scaramozzino	France	6:56.99	SA/B
3	Martyna Radosz; Krystyna Lemańczyk-Dobrzelak	Poland	6:58.21	SC/D
4	Milica Slijepčević; Jovana Arsić	Serbia	7:22.11	SC/D

==== Repechage 3 ====
Rank	Rowers	Country	Time	Notes
1	Stefania Buttignon; Stefania Gobbi	Italy	6:59.22	SA/B
2	Lenka Antošová; Kristýna Fleissnerová	Czech Republic	7:01.39	SA/B
3	Leonie Menzel; Pia Greiten	Germany	7:02.02	SC/D
4	Vivien Preil; Zoltana Gadanyi	Hungary	7:26.70	SC/D

==== Repechage 4 ====
Rank	Rowers	Country	Time	Notes
1	Gabrielle Smith; Andrea Proske	Canada	7:02.65	SA/B
2	Tatsiana Klimovich; Krystsina Staraselets	Belarus	7:03.78	SA/B
3	Ruth Siddorn; Kyra Edwards	Great Britain	7:08.80	SC/D
4	Pascale Walker; Sofia Meakin	Switzerland	7:12.17	SC/D

=== Semifinals C/D ===
The three fastest boats in each semi were sent to the C final. The remaining boats were sent to the D final.

==== Semifinal 1 ====
Rank	Rowers	Country	Time	Notes
1	Leonie Menzel; Pia Greiten	Germany	6:52.91	FC
2	Daryna Verkhohliad; Nataliya Dovhodko	Ukraine	6:55.55	FC
3	Milica Slijepčević; Jovana Arsić	Serbia	6:59.55	FC
4	Pascale Walker; Sofia Meakin	Switzerland	7:01.42	FD
5	Aimee Hernandez; Yariulvis Cobas	Cuba	7:07.31	FD

==== Semifinal 2 ====
Rank	Rowers	Country	Time	Notes
1	Martyna Radosz; Krystyna Lemańczyk-Dobrzelak	Poland	6:53.41	FC
2	Ruth Siddorn; Kyra Edwards	Great Britain	6:59.27	FC
3	Aspasia Christodoulidis; Anneta Kyridou	Greece	7:05.92	FC
4	Vivien Preil; Zoltana Gadanyi	Hungary	7:06.81	FD

=== Semifinals A/B ===
The three fastest boats in each semi advanced to the A final. The remaining boats were sent to the B final.

==== Semifinal 1 ====
Rank	Rowers	Country	Time	Notes
1	Brooke Donoghue; Olivia Loe	New Zealand	6:54.49	FA
2	Gabrielle Smith; Andrea Proske	Canada	6:55.81	FA
3	Roos de Jong; Lisa Scheenaard	Netherlands	6:55.86	FA
4	Lu Shiyu; Wang Yuwei	China	6:59.26	FB
5	Milda Valčiukaitė; Ieva Adomavičiūtė	Lithuania	7:03.37	FB
6	Lenka Antošová; Kristýna Fleissnerová	Czech Republic	7:04.94	FB

==== Semifinal 2 ====
Rank	Rowers	Country	Time	Notes
1	Nicoleta-Ancuţa Bodnar; Simona Radiș	Romania	6:56.60	FA
2	Hélène Lefebvre; Élodie Ravera-Scaramozzino	France	6:57.92	FA
3	Cicely Madden; Genevra Stone	United States	6:58.53	FA
4	Amanda Bateman; Genevieve Horton	Australia	6:59.14	FB
5	Tatsiana Klimovich; Krystsina Staraselets	Belarus	7:00.78	FB
6	Stefania Buttignon; Stefania Gobbi	Italy	7:03.89	FB

=== Finals ===
The A final determined the rankings for places 1 to 6. Additional rankings were determined in the other finals.

==== Final D ====
Rank	Rowers	Country	Time
1	Pascale Walker; Sofia Meakin	Switzerland	7:09.01
2	Aimee Hernandez; Yariulvis Cobas	Cuba	7:11.43
3	Vivien Preil; Zoltana Gadanyi	Hungary	7:14.13

==== Final C ====
Rank	Rowers	Country	Time
1	Martyna Radosz; Krystyna Lemańczyk-Dobrzelak	Poland	7:00.05
2	Ruth Siddorn; Kyra Edwards	Great Britain	7:01.79
3	Leonie Menzel; Pia Greiten	Germany	7:02.10
4	Daryna Verkhohliad; Nataliya Dovhodko	Ukraine	7:06.89
5	Milica Slijepčević; Jovana Arsić	Serbia	7:08.76
6	Aspasia Christodoulidis; Anneta Kyridou	Greece	7:13.57

==== Final B ====
Rank	Rowers	Country	Time
1	Stefania Buttignon; Stefania Gobbi	Italy	6:57.08
2	Lenka Antošová; Kristýna Fleissnerová	Czech Republic	6:57.12
3	Milda Valčiukaitė; Ieva Adomavičiūtė	Lithuania	6:57.83
4	Lu Shiyu; Wang Yuwei	China	6:58.04
5	Amanda Bateman; Genevieve Horton	Australia	6:58.11
6	Tatsiana Klimovich; Krystsina Staraselets	Belarus	6:58.60

==== Final A ====
Rank	Rowers	Country	Time
1st place, gold medalist(s)	Brooke Donoghue; Olivia Loe	New Zealand	6:47.17
2nd place, silver medalist(s)	Nicoleta-Ancuţa Bodnar; Simona Radiș	Romania	6:48.55
3rd place, bronze medalist(s)	Roos de Jong; Lisa Scheenaard	Netherlands	6:49.22
4	Gabrielle Smith; Andrea Proske	Canada	6:49.85
5	Cicely Madden; Genevra Stone	United States	6:49.86
6	Hélène Lefebvre; Élodie Ravera-Scaramozzino	France	6:52.09
