= 2018 World Rowing Championships – Women's double sculls =

Women's double sculls at the 2018 World Rowing Championships
- Venue: Plovdiv Regatta Venue
- Location: Plovdiv, Bulgaria
- Dates: 10–16 September
- Competitors: 36 from 18 nations
- Winning time: 6:44.15

Medalists
gold medal	Milda Valčiukaitė; Ieva Adomavičiūtė	Lithuania
silver medal	Brooke Donoghue; Olivia Loe	New Zealand
bronze medal	Meghan O'Leary; Ellen Tomek	United States

The women's double sculls competition at the 2018 World Rowing Championships in Plovdiv took place at the Plovdiv Regatta Venue.

== Schedule ==
The schedule was as follows:

Date	Time	Round
Monday 10 September 2018	11:05	Heats
Wednesday 12 September 2018	12:13	Repechages
Friday 14 September 2018	09:35	Semifinals A/B
Sunday 16 September 2018	10:02	Final C
Sunday 16 September 2018	11:02	Final B
Sunday 16 September 2018	13:00	Final A

All times are Eastern European Summer Time (UTC+3)

== Results ==
=== Heats ===
The two fastest boats in each heat advanced directly to the A/B semifinals. The remaining boats were sent to the repechages.

==== Heat 1 ====
Rank	Rowers	Country	Time	Notes
1	Charlotte Hodgkins-Byrne; Anna Thornton	Great Britain	6:53.28	SA/B
2	Meghan O'Leary; Ellen Tomek	United States	6:55.11	SA/B
3	Hélène Lefebvre; Élodie Ravera-Scaramozzino	France	6:57.76	R
4	Kristýna Fleissnerová; Lenka Antošová	Czech Republic	7:00.91	R
5	Krystyna Lemańczyk-Dobrzelak; Martyna Mikołajczak	Poland	7:02.07	R
6	Aikaterini Nikolaidou; Sofia Asoumanaki	Greece	7:08.08	R

==== Heat 2 ====
Rank	Rowers	Country	Time	Notes
1	Gabrielle Smith; Andrea Proske	Canada	6:54.02	SA/B
2	Roos de Jong; Lisa Scheenaard	Netherlands	6:55.57	SA/B
3	Chen Yunxia; Jiang Yan	China	6:57.45	R
4	Carina Bär; Michaela Staelberg	Germany	7:04.50	R
5	Pascale Walker; Valerie Rosset	Switzerland	7:07.22	R
6	Monika Dukarska; Aileen Crowley	Ireland	7:08.79	R

==== Heat 3 ====
Rank	Rowers	Country	Time	Notes
1	Brooke Donoghue; Olivia Loe	New Zealand	6:52.14	SA/B
2	Milda Valčiukaitė; Ieva Adomavičiūtė	Lithuania	6:57.79	SA/B
3	Antonia Abraham; Melita Abraham	Chile	6:57.79	R
4	Valentina Iseppi; Kiri Tontodonati	Italy	7:04.31	R
5	Nataliya Dovhodko; Yana Dementyeva	Ukraine	7:04.31	R
6	Larisa Elena Rosu; Nicoleta-Ancuța Bodnar	Romania	7:04.31	R

=== Repechages ===
The three fastest boats in each repechage advanced to the A/B semifinals. The remaining boats were sent to the C final.

==== Repechage 1 ====
Rank	Rowers	Country	Time	Notes
1	Chen Yunxia; Jiang Yan	China	6:58.82	SA/B
2	Hélène Lefebvre; Élodie Ravera-Scaramozzino	France	7:00.75	SA/B
3	Aikaterini Nikolaidou; Sofia Asoumanaki	Greece	7:00.88	SA/B
4	Valentina Iseppi; Kiri Tontodonati	Italy	7:02.65	FC
5	Pascale Walker; Valerie Rosset	Switzerland	7:07.32	FC
6	Larisa Elena Rosu; Nicoleta-Ancuța Bodnar	Romania	7:09.14	FC

==== Repechage 2 ====
Rank	Rowers	Country	Time	Notes
1	Kristýna Fleissnerová; Lenka Antošová	Czech Republic	7:00.07	SA/B
2	Carina Bär; Michaela Staelberg	Germany	7:00.30	SA/B
3	Krystyna Lemańczyk-Dobrzelak; Martyna Mikołajczak	Poland	7:00.48	SA/B
4	Antonia Abraham; Melita Abraham	Chile	7:01.19	FC
5	Monika Dukarska; Aileen Crowley	Ireland	7:03.48	FC
6	Nataliya Dovhodko; Yana Dementyeva	Ukraine	7:05.18	FC

=== Semifinals ===
The three fastest boats in each semi advanced to the A final. The remaining boats were sent to the B final.

==== Semifinal 1 ====
Rank	Rowers	Country	Time	Notes
1	Gabrielle Smith; Andrea Proske	Canada	6:50.80	FA
2	Milda Valčiukaitė; Ieva Adomavičiūtė	Lithuania	6:51.01	FA
3	Charlotte Hodgkins-Byrne; Anna Thornton	Great Britain	6:53.05	FA
4	Krystyna Lemańczyk-Dobrzelak; Martyna Mikołajczak	Poland	6:53.21	FB
5	Kristýna Fleissnerová; Lenka Antošová	Czech Republic	6:54.04	FB
6	Hélène Lefebvre; Élodie Ravera-Scaramozzino	France	6:54.85	FB

==== Semifinal 2 ====
Rank	Rowers	Country	Time	Notes
1	Meghan O'Leary; Ellen Tomek	United States	6:51.28	FA
2	Brooke Donoghue; Olivia Loe	New Zealand	6:51.60	FA
3	Roos de Jong; Lisa Scheenaard	Netherlands	6:53.10	FA
4	Chen Yunxia; Jiang Yan	China	6:53.68	FB
5	Carina Bär; Michaela Staelberg	Germany	6:57.20	FB
6	Aikaterini Nikolaidou; Sofia Asoumanaki	Greece	7:09.02	FB

=== Finals ===
The A final determined the rankings for places 1 to 6. Additional rankings were determined in the other finals.

==== Final C ====
Rank	Rowers	Country	Time
1	Monika Dukarska; Aileen Crowley	Ireland	6:54.55
2	Antonia Abraham; Melita Abraham	Chile	6:57.29
3	Valentina Iseppi; Kiri Tontodonati	Italy	6:58.17
4	Pascale Walker; Valerie Rosset	Switzerland	7:01.04
5	Nataliya Dovhodko; Yana Dementyeva	Ukraine	7:06.34
6	Larisa Elena Rosu; Nicoleta-Ancuța Bodnar	Romania	7:09.23

==== Final B ====
Rank	Rowers	Country	Time
1	Kristýna Fleissnerová; Lenka Antošová	Czech Republic	6:49.84
2	Krystyna Lemańczyk-Dobrzelak; Martyna Mikołajczak	Poland	6:51.97
3	Chen Yunxia; Jiang Yan	China	6:55.21
4	Carina Bär; Michaela Staelberg	Germany	6:56.14
5	Aikaterini Nikolaidou; Sofia Asoumanaki	Greece	6:57.10
6	Hélène Lefebvre; Élodie Ravera-Scaramozzino	France	7:00.19

==== Final A ====
Rank	Rowers	Country	Time
1st place, gold medalist(s)	Milda Valčiukaitė; Ieva Adomavičiūtė	Lithuania	6:44.15
2nd place, silver medalist(s)	Brooke Donoghue; Olivia Loe	New Zealand	6:46.28
3rd place, bronze medalist(s)	Meghan O'Leary; Ellen Tomek	United States	6:47.75
4	Charlotte Hodgkins-Byrne; Anna Thornton	Great Britain	6:51.59
5	Roos de Jong; Lisa Scheenaard	Netherlands	6:52.69
6	Gabrielle Smith; Andrea Proske	Canada	6:56.01
