= 2017 World Rowing Championships – Women's double sculls =

Women's double sculls at the 2017 World Rowing Championships
- Venue: Nathan Benderson Park
- Location: Sarasota, United States
- Dates: 25 September – 1 October
- Competitors: 28 from 14 nations
- Winning time: 6:45.08

Medalists
gold medal	Brooke Donoghue; Olivia Loe	New Zealand
silver medal	Meghan O'Leary; Ellen Tomek	United States
bronze medal	Olympia Aldersey; Madeleine Edmunds	Australia

The women's double sculls competition at the 2017 World Rowing Championships in Sarasota took place in Nathan Benderson Park.

== Schedule ==
The schedule was as follows:

Date	Time	Round
Monday 25 September 2017	11:46	Heats
Wednesday 27 September 2017	11:45	Repechage
Thursday 28 September 2017	13:46	Final C
Friday 29 September 2017	10:25	Semifinals A/B
Sunday 1 October 2017	09:05	Final B
Sunday 1 October 2017	10:27	Final A

All times are Eastern Daylight Time (UTC-4)

== Results ==
=== Heats ===
The three fastest boats in each heat advanced directly to the A/B semifinals. The remaining boats were sent to the repechage.

==== Heat 1 ====
Rank	Rowers	Country	Time	Notes
1	Milda Valčiukaitė; Ieva Adomavičiūtė	Lithuania	6:58.28	SA/B
2	Olympia Aldersey; Madeleine Edmunds	Australia	7:02.10	SA/B
3	Kristýna Fleissnerová; Lenka Antošová	Czech Republic	7:03.69	SA/B
4	Anna Malvina Svennung; Lovisa Claesson	Sweden	7:07.06	R
5	Carlotta Nwajide; Julia Leiding	Germany	7:17.70	R

==== Heat 2 ====
Rank	Rowers	Country	Time	Notes
1	Brooke Donoghue; Olivia Loe	New Zealand	6:54.08	SA/B
2	Kiri Tontodonati; Stefania Gobbi	Italy	6:57.39	SA/B
3	Aikaterini Nikolaidou; Anneta Kyridou	Greece	6:58.00	SA/B
4	Anne Larsen; Mette Petersen	Denmark	6:59.10	R
5	Glory Semidara; Favour Bewei	Nigeria	8:48.86	R

==== Heat 3 ====
Rank	Rowers	Country	Time	Notes
1	Meghan O'Leary; Ellen Tomek	United States	6:52.08	SA/B
2	Wang Fei; Lü Yang	China	6:54.10	SA/B
3	Hélène Lefebvre; Élodie Ravera-Scaramozzino	France	6:54.89	SA/B
4	Marloes Oldenburg; Roos de Jong	Netherlands	6:56.20	R

=== Repechage ===
The three fastest boats advanced to the A/B semifinals. The remaining boats were sent to the C final.

Rank	Rowers	Country	Time	Notes
1	Marloes Oldenburg; Roos de Jong	Netherlands	7:03.53	SA/B
2	Anna Malvina Svennung; Lovisa Claesson	Sweden	7:04.59	SA/B
3	Carlotta Nwajide; Julia Leiding	Germany	7:05.02	SA/B
4	Anne Larsen; Mette Petersen	Denmark	7:11.44	FC
5	Glory Semidara; Favour Bewei	Nigeria	8:50.61	FC

=== Semifinals ===
The three fastest boats in each semi advanced to the A final. The remaining boats were sent to the B final.

==== Semifinal 1 ====
Rank	Rowers	Country	Time	Notes
1	Meghan O'Leary; Ellen Tomek	United States	6:55.29	FA
2	Milda Valčiukaitė; Ieva Adomavičiūtė	Lithuania	6:57.86	FA
3	Hélène Lefebvre; Élodie Ravera-Scaramozzino	France	6:59.81	FA
4	Kiri Tontodonati; Stefania Gobbi	Italy	7:02.83	FB
5	Carlotta Nwajide; Julia Leiding	Germany	7:02.92	FB
6	Anna Malvina Svennung; Lovisa Claesson	Sweden	7:09.79	FB

==== Semifinal 2 ====
Rank	Rowers	Country	Time	Notes
1	Brooke Donoghue; Olivia Loe	New Zealand	6:54.38	FA
2	Olympia Aldersey; Madeleine Edmunds	Australia	6:57.16	FA
3	Wang Fei; Lü Yang	China	6:59.32	FA
4	Marloes Oldenburg; Roos de Jong	Netherlands	7:04.73	FB
5	Kristýna Fleissnerová; Lenka Antošová	Czech Republic	7:04.84	FB
6	Aikaterini Nikolaidou; Anneta Kyridou	Greece	7:17.12	FB

=== Finals ===
The A final determined the rankings for places 1 to 6. Additional rankings were determined in the other finals.

==== Final C ====
Rank	Rowers	Country	Time
1	Anne Larsen; Mette Petersen	Denmark	7:10.93
2	Glory Semidara; Favour Bewei	Nigeria	8:46.95

==== Final B ====
Rank	Rowers	Country	Time
1	Kristýna Fleissnerová; Lenka Antošová	Czech Republic	7:05.30
2	Marloes Oldenburg; Roos de Jong	Netherlands	7:05.94
3	Kiri Tontodonati; Stefania Gobbi	Italy	7:07.52
4	Carlotta Nwajide; Julia Leiding	Germany	7:13.10
5	Anna Malvina Svennung; Lovisa Claesson	Sweden	7:16.20
6	Aikaterini Nikolaidou; Anneta Kyridou	Greece	7:28.29

==== Final A ====
Rank	Rowers	Country	Time
1st place, gold medalist(s)	Brooke Donoghue; Olivia Loe	New Zealand	6:45.08
2nd place, silver medalist(s)	Meghan O'Leary; Ellen Tomek	United States	6:46.57
3rd place, bronze medalist(s)	Olympia Aldersey; Madeleine Edmunds	Australia	6:49.76
4	Milda Valčiukaitė; Ieva Adomavičiūtė	Lithuania	6:51.30
5	Wang Fei; Lü Yang	China	6:52.86
6	Hélène Lefebvre; Élodie Ravera-Scaramozzino	France	6:54.65
