= Rowing at the 2020 Summer Olympics – Women's double sculls =

Olympic rowing event

Women's double sculls at the Games of the XXXII Olympiad
- Olympic rowing
- Venue: Sea Forest Waterway
- Dates: 23–28 July 2021
- Competitors: 26 from 13 nations

Medalists
1st place, gold medalist(s)		Nicoleta-Ancuța Bodnar; Simona Radiș	Romania
2nd place, silver medalist(s)		Brooke Donoghue; Hannah Osborne	New Zealand
3rd place, bronze medalist(s)		Roos de Jong; Lisa Scheenaard	Netherlands

The women's double sculls event at the 2020 Summer Olympics is scheduled took place from 23 to 28 July 2021 at the Sea Forest Waterway. 26 rowers from 13 nations competed.

== Background ==
This was the 12th appearance of the event, which has been held every year since women's rowing was introduced in 1976.

The reigning Olympic medalists were Poland, Great Britain, and Lithuania. Lithuania was the only team to qualify.

== Qualification ==
Each National Olympic Committee (NOC) was limited to a single boat in the event. There were 13 qualifying places in the women's single sculls:

- 11 from the 2019 World Championship
- 2 from the final qualification regatta

The COVID-19 pandemic delayed many of the events for qualifying for rowing.

== Competition format ==
This rowing event is a double scull event, meaning that each boat is propelled by two rowers. The "scull" portion means that the rower uses two oars, one on each side of the boat; this contrasts with sweep rowing in which each rower has one oar and rows on only one side. The competition consists of multiple rounds. The competition continues to use the three-round format. Finals are held to determine the placing of each boat. The course uses the 2000 metres distance that became the Olympic standard in 1912.

During the first round three heats were held. The first three boats in each heat advanced to the semifinals, with the others relegated to the repechage.

The repechage offered rowers a second chance to qualify for the semifinals. Placing in the repechage determined which semifinal the boat would race in. The top three boats in the repechage moved on to the semifinals, with the remaining boats eliminated.

Two semifinal heats were held, each with 6 boats. The top three boats from each heat advanced to Final A and competed for a medal. The remaining boats advanced to Final B.

The third and final round is the finals. Each final determined a set of rankings. The A final determined the medals, along with the rest of the places through 6th, while the B final gave rankings from 7th to 12th.

== Schedule ==
The competition was held over six days.

All times are Japan Standard Time (UTC+9)

Date	Time	Round
Friday, 23 July 2021	11:00	Heats
Saturday, 24 July 2021	9:00	Repechage
Sunday, 25 July 2021	12:20	Semifinals A/B
Wednesday, 28 July 2021	8:10	Final B
Wednesday, 28 July 2021	9:18	Final A

== Results ==
=== Heats ===
The first three of each heat qualified for the semifinals, while the remainder went to the repechage.

==== Heat 1 ====
Rank	Lane	Rower	Nation	Time	Notes
1	3	Brooke Donoghue; Hannah Osborne	New Zealand	6:53.62	Q
2	1	Kristina Wagner; Genevra Stone	United States	6:55.65	Q
3	4	Helene Lefebvre; Elodie Ravera-Scaramozzino	France	6:57.83	Q
4	2	Shuangmei Shen; Xiaoxin Liu	China	7:03.78	R
5	5	Kristyna Fleissnerova; Lenka Antosova	Czech Republic	7:05.56	R

==== Heat 2 ====
Rank	Lane	Rower	Nation	Time	Notes
1	3	Nicoleta-Ancuța Bodnar; Simona Radis	Romania	6:49.79	Q
2	4	Gabrielle Smith; Jessica Sevick	Canada	6:57.69	Q
3	1	Alessandra Patelli; Chiara Ondoli	Italy	6:59.58	Q
4	2	Ekaterina Pitirimova; Ekaterina Kurochkina	ROC	7:03.96	R

==== Heat 3 ====
Rank	Lane	Rower	Nation	Time	Notes
1	4	Roos de Jong; Lisa Scheenaard	Netherlands	6:49.90	Q
2	3	Donata Karalienė; Milda Valciukaite	Lithuania	6:50.38	Q
3	1	Amanda Bateman; Tara Rigney	Australia	6:53.30	Q
4	2	Annekatrin Thiele; Leonie Menzel	Germany	6:59.61	R

=== Repechage ===
The first three pairs in the repechage qualified for the semifinals, while the fourth pair was eliminated.

Rank	Lane	Rower	Nation	Time	Notes
1	4	Ekaterina Pitirimova; Ekaterina Kurochkina	ROC	7:13.77	Q
2	2	Annekatrin Thiele; Leonie Menzel	Germany	7:14.92	Q
3	3	Kristyna Fleissnerova; Lenka Antosova	Czech Republic	7:16.96	Q
4	1	Shuangmei Shen; Xiaoxin Liu	China	7:21.93	

=== Semifinals ===
The first three of each heat qualify to the Final A, other to Final B

==== Semifinal A/B 1 ====
Rank	Lane	Rower	Nation	Time	Notes
1	3	Nicoleta-Ancuța Bodnar; Simona Radis	Romania	7:04.31	FA
2	5	Brooke Donoghue; Hannah Osborne	New Zealand	7:09.05	FA
3	2	Donata Karalienė; Milda Valciukaite	Lithuania	7:11.29	FA
4	4	Alessandra Patelli; Chiara Ondoli	Italy	7:19.25	FB
5	6	Kristyna Fleissnerova; Lenka Antosova	Czech Republic	7:24.22	FB
6	1	Ekaterina Pitirimova; Ekaterina Kurochkina	ROC	7:24.37	FB

==== Semifinal A/B 2 ====
Rank	Lane	Rower	Nation	Time	Notes
1	3	Roos de Jong; Lisa Scheenaard	Netherlands	7:08.09	FA
2	2	Gabrielle Smith; Jessica Sevick	Canada	7:09.44	FA
3	4	Kristina Wagner; Genevra Stone	United States	7:11.14	FA
4	1	Helene Lefebvre; Elodie Ravera-Scaramozzino	France	7:12.68	FB
5	5	Amanda Bateman; Tara Rigney	Australia	7:15.25	FB
6	6	Annekatrin Thiele; Leonie Menzel	Germany	7:20.44	FB

== Finals ==
=== Final B ===
Rank	Lane	Rower	Nation	Time	Notes
7	2	Amanda Bateman; Tara Rigney	Australia	6:57.71	
8	3	Helene Lefebvre; Elodie Ravera-Scaramozzino	France	6:58.52	
9	4	Alessandra Patelli; Chiara Ondoli	Italy	6:58.88	
10	5	Kristyna Fleissnerova; Lenka Antosova	Czech Republic	6:59.19	
11	1	Annekatrin Thiele; Leonie Menzel	Germany	7:01.21	
12	6	Ekaterina Pitirimova; Ekaterina Kurochkina	ROC	7:01.83	

=== Final A ===
Rank	Lane	Rower	Nation	Time	Notes
1st place, gold medalist(s)	4	Nicoleta-Ancuța Bodnar; Simona Radiș	Romania	6:41.03	OB
2nd place, silver medalist(s)	5	Brooke Donoghue; Hannah Osborne	New Zealand	6:44.82	
3rd place, bronze medalist(s)	3	Roos de Jong; Lisa Scheenaard	Netherlands	6:45.73	
4	1	Donata Karalienė; Milda Valciukaite	Lithuania	6:47.44	
5	6	Kristina Wagner; Genevra Stone	United States	6:52.98	
6	2	Gabrielle Smith; Jessica Sevick	Canada	6:53.19	
