= Rowing at the 2013 Summer Universiade – Women's single sculls =

The women's single sculls competition at the 2013 Summer Universiade in Kazan took place the Kazan Rowing Centre.

== Results ==
=== Heats ===
==== Heat 1 ====
Rank	Rower	Country	Time	Notes
1	Jitka Antosova	Czech Republic	8:09.74	Q
2	Monika Dukarska	Ireland	8:11.43	Q
3	Iulia Volgina	Russia	8:14.16	R
4	Ieva Adomaviciute	Lithuania	8:20.47	R
5	Agnieszka Kobus	Poland	8:25.93	R

==== Heat 2 ====
Rank	Rower	Country	Time	Notes
1	Nataliya Dovhodko	Ukraine	8:10.72	Q
2	Elza Gulbe	Latvia	8:15.35	Q
3	Kaisa Pajusalu	Estonia	8:27.09	R
4	Virginia Rivas	Spain	8:45.79	R
5	Karen Belsby	Norway	9:08.02	R

=== Repechage ===
Rank	Rower	Country	Time	Notes
1	Agnieszka Kobus	Poland	9:13.76	Q
2	Iulia Volgina	Russia	9:14.77	Q
3	Ieva Adomaviciute	Lithuania	9:20.24	FB
4	Virginia Rivas	Spain	9:40.76	FB
5	Karen Belsby	Norway	9:54.65	FB
	Kaisa Pajusalu	Estonia	DNS	

=== Finals ===
==== Final B ====
Rank	Rower	Country	Time	Notes
1	Ieva Adomaviciute	Lithuania	8:19.40	
2	Virginia Rivas	Spain	8:34.10	
3	Karen Belsby	Norway	8:50.78	

==== Final A ====
Rank	Rower	Country	Time	Notes
1st place, gold medalist(s)	Nataliya Dovhodko	Ukraine	8:16.68	
2nd place, silver medalist(s)	Jitka Antosova	Czech Republic	8:17.01	
3rd place, bronze medalist(s)	Elza Gulbe	Latvia	8:23.32	
4	Monika Dukarska	Ireland	8:36.51	
5	Agnieszka Kobus	Poland	8:40.78	
6	Iulia Volgina	Russia	8:48.90	
