= Brooke Francis =

New Zealand rower (born 1995)

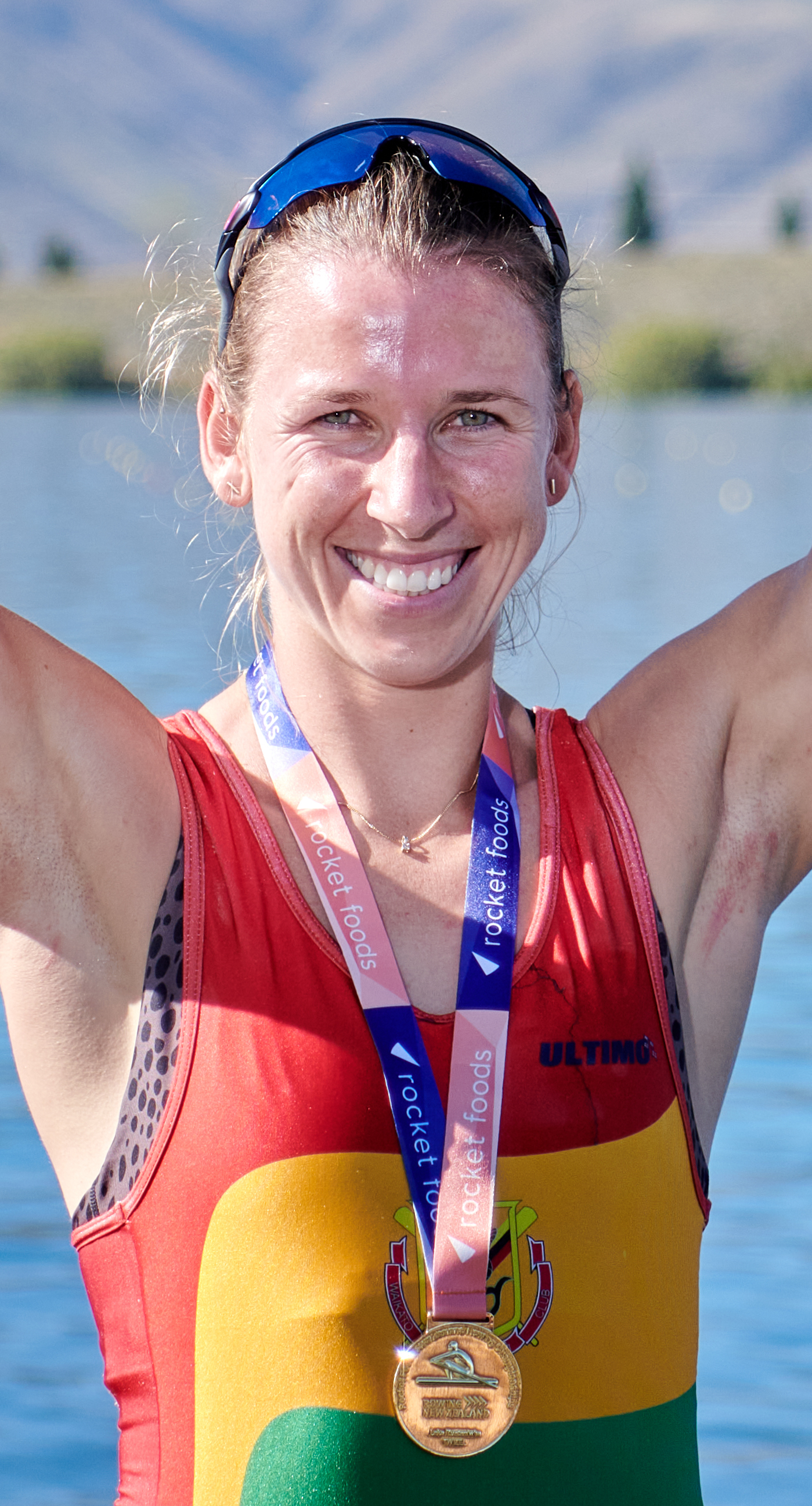
- Francis in 2021

Personal information
- Born: 6 January 1995 (age 31) Waikato, New Zealand

Sport
- Country: New Zealand
- Sport: Rowing
- Event: Double sculls
Medal record
Women's Rowing
Representing New Zealand
Olympic Games
Gold medal – first place	2024 Paris	Double sculls
Silver medal – second place	2020 Tokyo	Double sculls
World Championships
Gold medal – first place	2017 Sarasota	Double sculls
Gold medal – first place	2019 Ottensheim	Double sculls
Silver medal – second place	2018 Plovdiv	Double sculls

Brooke Francis (née Donoghue, born 6 January 1995) is a New Zealand rower. She has twice won the world championship in the double scull alongside Olivia Loe, is the incumbent world champion, and won a silver medal in this class at the 2020 Tokyo Olympics with rowing partner Hannah Osborne, followed by a gold medal at the 2024 Paris Olympics with Lucy Spoors. As of 2021, she has won ten premier national rowing championships.

== Early life ==
Donoghue was born in 1995 and grew up in Te Kauwhata in the Waikato. She received her secondary education at Te Kauwhata College and started rowing in 2010 while at that school.

== Career ==
Te Kauwhata College is one of the schools linked to the Mercer Rowing Club based in Mercer at the Waikato River, with Donoghue rowing for both her school and Mercer. She went to her first New Zealand Rowing Championships in February 2012, held at Lake Karapiro, where she came eighths in the senior women's single scull. At the February 2013 New Zealand rowing championships at Lake Ruataniwha, she won her first national medals. She came fifths in the U20 single sculls, won bronze in the U20 double scull, and silver in the U22 eight.

For the 2013/14 summer season, she changed to the Waikato Rowing Club and joined the Waikato Rowing Performance Centre. At the February 2014 New Zealand rowing championships, she first rowed with a premier women's crew and they came fourth in the eight. She gained three gold medals in the age group boat classes that she competed in: U20 single scull, U20 double scull, and U22 quad scull. This gained her selection to the New Zealand junior women's quad and at the August 2013 World Rowing Junior Championships in Trakai, Lithuania, her team came fifth; Zoe McBride was in the boat with her. At the February 2015 New Zealand rowing championships, she won medals in all four boat classes that she competed in, including her first medals with premier women's crews. She came third with the premier women's eight and second with the premier women's quad scull. In the U22 classes, she won gold in the quad scull (the same team that competed in the premier women's quad) and won silver in the single scull. These results gained her selection to New Zealand U23 team and at the 2015 World Rowing U23 Championships in Plovdiv, Bulgaria, she won silver in the double scull partnered with Claudia Hyde, beaten by the Romanian team of Viviana Iuliana Bejinariu and Ioana Vrînceanu.

At the February 2016 New Zealand rowing championships, she took out her first national title with a premier women's crew. She won silver with Hyde in the double scull and became national champion with the quad scull. In March 2016, Donoghue was announced as a member of the New Zealand Rowing Team, with a seat in the women's quad (alongside Georgia Perry, Lucy Spoors, and Sarah Gray) that had yet to qualify for the 2016 Summer Olympics. She competed at the Final Qualification regatta at the Rotsee near Lucerne, Switzerland, in May 2016 where they failed to qualify in third place as only two boats advanced to the Olympics.

At the February 2017 New Zealand rowing championships, she competed in three premier women boat classes and she won two national titles. In the single scull, she won bronze, beaten by McBride and Olivia Loe. She took out national titles in the double scull with Hannah Osborne and in the quad scull. For the New Zealand Rowing Team, she was paired with Loe to compete in the double scull. They competed at World Rowing Cups in Poland and Switzerland, and they won gold in both races. They then won the Stonor Challenge Trophy at the Henley Royal Regatta. At the 2017 World Rowing Championships in Sarasota, Florida, they continued their unbeaten run and became world champion in the women's double scull.

At the February 2018 New Zealand rowing championships, she competed in three premier women boat classes and she won two national titles. In the eight, she came fourth. She won national titles in the single scull and the double scull teamed with Perry. Again teamed up with Loe for international competitions, they competed at World Rowing Cups in Poland and the Netherlands, and they won gold in both races. At the 2018 World Rowing Championships, they were beaten by Milda Valčiukaitė and Ieva Adomavičiūtė from Lithuania to second place.

At the February 2019 New Zealand rowing championships, she competed in four boat classes, won medals in all four and won two national titles. With the eight, she won bronze. In the single scull, she came second behind Emma Twigg. She took out gold medals in the double and quad scull. Once again teamed up with Loe for international competitions, they won the 2019 World Rowing Cup II in Poznań, Poland. They then competed at Henley and took out the Stonor Challenge Trophy. They regained the world championship title at the 2019 World Rowing Championships in Ottensheim near Linz in Austria, which qualified this boat class for New Zealand for the 2020 Tokyo Olympics.

At the February 2020 New Zealand rowing championships, she competed in two boat classes. She retained her national championship title in the double scull, this time teamed up with Twigg. In the single scull, she came fourth, beaten by Twigg, Osborne and Loe for a medal. Due to the COVID-19 pandemic, there was no international rowing during 2020.

At the February 2021 New Zealand rowing championships, she competed in three boat classes. She retained her national championship title in the double scull, this time teamed up with Osborne, and regained the single scull title. In the quad scull, she came sixth. When New Zealand Rowing announced the female elite team later that month, Donoghue and Loe were nominated for the double scull. When the Olympic rowing team for the Tokyo Olympics got nominated in June 2021, it came as a surprise that Osborne had displaced Loe to join Donoghue in the double scull; Loe is instead going to join the quad scull. Stuff's rowing commentator Ian Anderson considers the women's double scull "to be among NZ's leading medal contenders in Tokyo". Osborne and Donoghue won their heat, placed second in the semi-final and took the silver medal in the Olympic final behind Romania.

=== National titles ===
National titles for senior rowers are known as Red Coats in New Zealand. As of 2021, Donoghue has won ten Red Coats.

Red Coats – New Zealand premier national titles
Single scull	2018, 2021
Double scull	2017, 2018, 2019, 2020, 2021
Quad scull	2016, 2017, 2019
