= Lithuania at the 2016 Summer Olympics =

- IOC code: LTU
- NOC: Lithuanian National Olympic Committee
- Website: www.ltok.lt (in Lithuanian and English)

in Rio de Janeiro
- Competitors: 67 in 15 sports
- Flag bearers: Gintarė Scheidt (opening); Edvinas Ramanauskas (closing)
- Medals Ranked 64th: Gold 0 Silver 1 Bronze 3 Total 4

Summer Olympics appearances (overview)
- 1924; 1928; 1932–1988; 1992; 1996; 2000; 2004; 2008; 2012; 2016; 2020; 2024

Other related appearances
- Russian Empire (1908–1912); Soviet Union (1952–1988)

Lithuania competed at the 2016 Summer Olympics in Rio de Janeiro, Brazil, from 5 to 21 August 2016. This was the nation's seventh consecutive appearance at the Games in the post-Soviet era and ninth overall in Summer Olympic history.

The National Olympic Committee of Lithuania (Lithuanian: Lietuvos tautinis olimpinis komitetas, LTOK) fielded a team of 67 athletes, 48 men and 19 women, across 15 sports at the Games. It was the nation's second-largest delegation sent to the Olympics, just four athletes short of the record achieved in Beijing 2008 (71). As usual, the men's basketball was the only team-based sport in which Lithuania qualified for the Games. Lithuania marked its Olympic debut in tennis and women's judo, as well as its return to weightlifting after missing out of the previous Games.

The Lithuanian squad featured three Olympic medalists from London 2012, namely light welterweight boxer Evaldas Petrauskas, breaststroke swimmer and world record holder Rūta Meilutytė, and defending champion Laura Asadauskaitė in the women's modern pentathlon. Track cyclist Simona Krupeckaitė topped the list of experienced Lithuanian athletes to make her fourth Olympic appearance, while Laser Radial sailor and Beijing 2008 silver medalist Gintarė Scheidt was selected to lead the Lithuanian delegation as the flag bearer in the opening ceremony at her third Games, a historic first by a female in the nation's Olympic history. Other notable Lithuanian athletes included NBA players Jonas Valančiūnas and Domantas Sabonis (son of basketball legend and three-time Olympian Arvydas Sabonis), multiple-time European rowing medalist Mindaugas Griškonis, and swimming stalwarts Simonas Bilis and Giedrius Titenis.

Lithuania left Rio de Janeiro with four medals (one silver and three bronze), failing to collect a gold for the third time in its Olympic history. Three of these medals were awarded to the Lithuanian team in weightlifting and rowing for the first time in 16 years, including a silver-medal feat from Griskonis and his new partner Saulius Ritter in the men's double sculls. Meanwhile, Aurimas Lankas and Edvinas Ramanauskas continued to add canoeing medals for Lithuania with a bronze in the men's K-2 200 m, following Jevgenijus Šuklinas' runner-up finish at London 2012. Once again, the men's basketball squad failed to reach the medal rounds for the second straight time, losing to Australia in the quarterfinals.

== Medalists ==
| Medal | Name | Sport | Event | Date |
|---|---|---|---|---|
| Silver | Mindaugas Griškonis; Saulius Ritter | Rowing | Men's double sculls | 11 August |
| Bronze | Milda Valčiukaitė; Donata Vištartaitė | Rowing | Women's double sculls | 11 August |
| Bronze | Aurimas Didžbalis | Weightlifting | Men's 94 kg | 13 August |
| Bronze | Aurimas Lankas; Edvinas Ramanauskas | Canoeing | Men's K-2 200 m | 18 August |

Medals by sport
| Sport | 1st place, gold medalist(s) | 2nd place, silver medalist(s) | 3rd place, bronze medalist(s) | Total |
| Rowing | 0 | 1 | 1 | 2 |
| Weightlifting | 0 | 0 | 1 | 1 |
| Canoeing | 0 | 0 | 1 | 1 |
| Total | 0 | 1 | 3 | 4 |

Medals by gender
| Gender | 1st place, gold medalist(s) | 2nd place, silver medalist(s) | 3rd place, bronze medalist(s) | Total |
| Male | 0 | 1 | 2 | 3 |
| Female | 0 | 0 | 1 | 1 |
| Total | 0 | 1 | 3 | 4 |

== Competitors ==
| Sport | Men | Women | Total |
|---|---|---|---|
| Athletics | 7 | 9 | 16 |
| Basketball | 12 | 0 | 12 |
| Boxing | 2 | 0 | 2 |
| Canoeing | 6 | 0 | 6 |
| Cycling | 2 | 2 | 4 |
| Gymnastics | 1 | 0 | 1 |
| Judo | 0 | 1 | 1 |
| Modern pentathlon | 1 | 2 | 3 |
| Rowing | 7 | 3 | 10 |
| Sailing | 1 | 1 | 2 |
| Shooting | 1 | 0 | 1 |
| Swimming | 5 | 1 | 6 |
| Tennis | 1 | 0 | 1 |
| Weightlifting | 1 | 0 | 1 |
| Wrestling | 1 | 0 | 1 |
| Total | 48 | 19 | 67 |

== Athletics ==
Lithuanian athletes have so far achieved qualifying standards in the following athletics events (up to a maximum of 3 athletes in each event):

Key

- Note–Ranks given for track events are within the athlete's heat only
- Q = Qualified for the next round
- q = Qualified for the next round as a fastest loser or, in field events, by position without achieving the qualifying target
- NR = National record
- N/A = Round not applicable for the event
- Bye = Athlete not required to compete in round

Track & road events
Men

| Athlete | Event | Final | |
| Athlete | Event | Result | Rank |
|---|---|---|---|
| Valdas Dopolskas | Marathon | 2:28:21 | 111 |
| Remigijus Kančys | Marathon | 2:21:10 | 75 |
| Arturas Mastianica | 50 km walk | DNF | |
| Marius Šavelskis | 20 km walk | 1:29:26 | 59 |
| Tadas Šuškevičius | 50 km walk | 4:04:10 | 33 |
| Marius Žiūkas | 20 km walk | 1:22:27 SB | 26 |

Women

| Athlete | Event | Heat | | Semifinal | | Final | |
| Athlete | Event | Result | Rank | Result | Rank | Result | Rank |
|---|---|---|---|---|---|---|---|
| Neringa Aidietytė | 20 km walk | —N/a | | | | DNF | |
| Eglė Balčiūnaitė | 800 m | 2:02.98 SB | 6 | Did not advance | | | |
| Rasa Drazdauskaitė | Marathon | —N/a | | | | 2:35:50 | 37 |
| Diana Lobačevskė | Marathon | —N/a | | | | 2:30:48 | 17 |
| Živilė Vaiciukevičiūtė | 20 km walk | —N/a | | | | 1:41:28 | 56 |
| Brigita Virbalytė-Dimšienė | 20 km walk | —N/a | | | | 1:35:11 | 29 |
| Vaida Žūsinaitė | Marathon | —N/a | | | | 2:35:53 | 38 |

Field events

| Athlete | Event | Qualification | | Final | |
| Athlete | Event | Distance | Position | Distance | Position |
|---|---|---|---|---|---|
| Andrius Gudžius | Men's discus throw | 65.18 SB | 4 q | 60.66 | 12 |
| Airinė Palšytė | Women's high jump | 1.94 | 11 Q | 1.88 | 13 |
| Zinaida Sendriūtė | Women's discus throw | 60.79 | 11 q | 61.89 SB | 10 |

== Basketball ==
=== Men's tournament ===
The Lithuanian men's basketball team qualified for the Olympics by attaining a top two finish after the final match of the EuroBasket 2015 in France.

Team roster

The following is the Lithuania roster in the men's basketball tournament of the 2016 Summer Olympics.

Lithuania men's national basketball team – 2016 Summer Olympics roster
Players
Coaches

| Pos. | No. | Name | Age – Date of birth | Height | Club | Ctr. |
|---|---|---|---|---|---|---|
| PG | 5 | Mantas Kalnietis | 29 – 6 September 1986 | 1.95 m (6 ft 5 in) | Olimpia Milano | (Italy) |
| G | 7 | Adas Juškevičius | 27 – 3 January 1989 | 1.94 m (6 ft 4 in) | Lietuvos Rytas | (Lithuania) |
| SF | 8 | Jonas Mačiulis | 31 – 10 February 1985 | 1.98 m (6 ft 6 in) | Real Madrid | (Spain) |
| SG | 10 | Renaldas Seibutis | 31 – 23 July 1985 | 1.96 m (6 ft 5 in) | Žalgiris | (Lithuania) |
| F/C | 11 | Domantas Sabonis | 20 – 3 May 1996 | 2.11 m (6 ft 11 in) | Gonzaga Bulldogs | (United States) |
| C | 12 | Antanas Kavaliauskas | 31 – 19 September 1984 | 2.08 m (6 ft 10 in) | Lietuvos Rytas | (Lithuania) |
| PF | 13 | Paulius Jankūnas | 32 – 29 April 1984 | 2.05 m (6 ft 9 in) | Žalgiris | (Lithuania) |
| C | 15 | Robertas Javtokas (C) | 36 – 20 March 1980 | 2.11 m (6 ft 11 in) | Žalgiris | (Lithuania) |
| C | 17 | Jonas Valančiūnas | 24 – 6 May 1992 | 2.13 m (7 ft 0 in) | Toronto Raptors | (Canada) |
| SF | 19 | Mindaugas Kuzminskas | 26 – 19 October 1989 | 2.05 m (6 ft 9 in) | Unicaja Málaga | (Spain) |
| G/F | 40 | Marius Grigonis | 22 – 26 April 1994 | 1.98 m (6 ft 6 in) | ICL Manresa | (Spain) |
| G | 93 | Vaidas Kariniauskas | 22 – 16 November 1993 | 1.97 m (6 ft 6 in) | Kymis B.C. | (Greece) |

Head coach

- (Lithuania) Jonas Kazlauskas

Assistant coach(es)

- (Lithuania) Darius Maskoliūnas
- (Lithuania) Gintaras Krapikas

Legend

- Club – describes last
  club before the tournament
- Age – describes age
  on 6 August 2016

Group play

| Pos | Team | Pld | W | L | PF | PA | PD | Pts | Qualification |
|---|---|---|---|---|---|---|---|---|---|
| 1 | Croatia | 5 | 3 | 2 | 400 | 407 | −7 | 8 (Note: In games among the four teams at 3–2, Croatia and Spain were 2–1 while Argentina and Lithuania were 1–2. Croatia beat Spain 72–70, and Lithuania beat Argentina 81–73.) | Quarterfinals |
| 2 | Spain | 5 | 3 | 2 | 432 | 357 | +75 | 8 | Quarterfinals |
| 3 | Lithuania | 5 | 3 | 2 | 392 | 428 | −36 | 8 | Quarterfinals |
| 4 | Argentina | 5 | 3 | 2 | 441 | 428 | +13 | 8 | Quarterfinals |
| 5 | Brazil (H) | 5 | 2 | 3 | 411 | 407 | +4 | 7 | |
| 6 | Nigeria | 5 | 1 | 4 | 392 | 441 | −49 | 6 | |

Source: FIBA
Rules for classification: 1) points; 2) head-to-head points; 3) head-to-head points difference; 4) head-to-head number of points scored.
(H) Hosts
Notes:

7 August 2016
14:15

Boxscore

| Brazil | 76–82 | Lithuania |
Scoring by quarter: 17–27, 12–31, 23–12, 24–12
| Pts: Barbosa 21; Rebs: Nenê 8 Asts: Huertas 3 | | Pts: Kalnietis 16; Rebs: Jankūnas 7 Asts: Kalnietis 8 |

Carioca Arena 1, Rio de Janeiro
Attendance: 7,990
Referees: Eddie Viator (FRA), Steven Anderson (USA), José Reyes (MEX)

9 August 2016
19:00

Boxscore

| Lithuania | 89–80 | Nigeria |
Scoring by quarter: 13–16, 23–25, 29–13, 24–26
| Pts: Mačiulis 21; Rebs: Sabonis 7 Asts: Kalnietis 12 | | Pts: Diogu 19; Rebs: Diogu 7 Asts: Ere 4 |

Carioca Arena 1, Rio de Janeiro
Attendance: 5,785
Referees: Stephen Seibel (CAN), Robert Lottermoser (GER), Anne Panther (GER)

11 August 2016
22:30

Boxscore

| Lithuania | 81–73 | Argentina |
Scoring by quarter: 16–15, 14–12, 27–22, 24–24
| Pts: Kuzminskas 23; Rebs: Valančiūnas 10; Asts: Kalnietis 7 | | Pts: Ginóbili 22; Rebs: Nocioni, Scola 7 Asts: Scola 4 |

Carioca Arena 1, Rio de Janeiro
Attendance: 11,093
Referees: Ilija Belošević (SRB), Damir Javor (SLO), Eddie Viator (FRA)

13 August 2016
19:00

Boxscore

| Spain | 109–59 | Lithuania |
Scoring by quarter: 26–11, 22–18, 36–16, 25–14
| Pts: Gasol 23; Rebs: Reyes 9 Asts: Llull 6 | | Pts: Kuzminskas 17; Rebs: Valančiūnas 10; Asts: Mačiulis 2 |

Carioca Arena 1, Rio de Janeiro
Attendance: 11,045
Referees: Ilija Belošević (SRB), Roberto Vázquez (PUR), Oļegs Latiševs (LAT)

15 August 2016
22:30

Boxscore

| Lithuania | 81–90 | Croatia |
Scoring by quarter: 21–13, 20–34, 14–28, 26–15
| Pts: Kalnietis 26; Rebs: Valančiūnas 6 Asts: Kalnietis 11 | | Pts: Bogdanović 22; Rebs: Simon 10; Asts: Simon 6 |

Carioca Arena 1, Rio de Janeiro
Attendance: 7,809
Referees: Borys Ryzhyk (UKR), Steven Anderson (USA), Piotr Pastusiak (POL)

Quarterfinal

17 August 2016
11:00

Boxscore

| Australia | 90–64 | Lithuania |
Scoring by quarter: 26–17, 22–13, 22–13, 20–21
| Pts: Mills 24; Rebs: Bogut 7 Asts: Bogut 6 | | Pts: Kalnietis, Kavaliauskas 12; Rebs: Valančiūnas 8 Asts: Kalnietis 5 |

Carioca Arena 1, Rio de Janeiro
Attendance: 9,348
Referees: Steven Anderson (USA), Stephen Seibel (CAN), Piotr Pastusiak (POL)

== Boxing ==
Lithuania has entered two boxers to compete in each of the following weight classes into the Olympic boxing tournament. London 2012 bronze medalist Evaldas Petrauskas and European champion Eimantas Stanionis had claimed their Olympic spots at the 2016 European Qualification Tournament in Samsun, Turkey.

| Athlete | Event | Round of 32 | Round of 16 | Quarterfinals | Semifinals | Final | |
| Athlete | Event | Opposition Result | Opposition Result | Opposition Result | Opposition Result | Opposition Result | Rank |
|---|---|---|---|---|---|---|---|
| Evaldas Petrauskas | Men's light welterweight | Kumar (IND); L 1–2 | Did not advance | | | | |
| Eimantas Stanionis | Men's welterweight | Liu W (CHN); W 3–0 | Giyasov (UZB); L 0–3 | Did not advance | | | |

== Canoeing ==
=== Sprint ===
Lithuanian canoeists have qualified a total of four boats in each of the following distances for the Games through the 2015 ICF Canoe Sprint World Championships. The sprint canoeing roster was named to the Olympic squad at the conclusion of the 2016 European Sprint Qualifier in Duisburg, Germany.

| Athlete | Event | Heats | | Semifinals | | Final | |
| Athlete | Event | Time | Rank | Time | Rank | Time | Rank |
|---|---|---|---|---|---|---|---|
| Ignas Navakauskas | Men's K-1 200 m | 35.144 | 4 Q | 35.168 | 5 FB | 37.075 | 9 |
| Henrikas Žustautas | Men's C-1 200 m | 40.048 | 2 Q | 41.187 | 6 FB | 40.230 | 11 |
| Aurimas Lankas; Edvinas Ramanauskas | Men's K-2 200 m | 31.755 | 1 FA | Bye | | 32.382 | 3rd place, bronze medalist(s) |
| Ričardas Nekriošius; Andrej Olijnik | Men's K-2 1000 m | 3:24.246 | 3 Q | 3:18.526 | 2 FA | 3:14.748 | 5 |

Qualification Legend: FA = Qualify to final (medal); FB = Qualify to final B (non-medal)

== Cycling ==
=== Road ===
Lithuanian riders qualified for a maximum of two quota places in the men's Olympic road race by virtue of their top 15 final national ranking in the 2015 UCI Europe Tour. One additional spot was awarded to the Lithuanian cyclist in the women's road race by virtue of her top 100 individual placement in the 2016 UCI World Rankings.

| Athlete | Event | Time | Rank |
|---|---|---|---|
| Ignatas Konovalovas | Men's road race | OTL | |
| Ramūnas Navardauskas | Men's road race | 6:22:23 | 35 |
| Daiva Tušlaitė | Women's road race | 3:58:34 | 34 |

=== Track ===
Following the completion of the 2016 UCI Track Cycling World Championships, Lithuania has entered one rider to compete only in both women's sprint and keirin at the Olympics, by virtue of her final individual UCI Olympic rankings in those events.

Sprint

| Athlete | Event | Qualification | | Round 1 | Repechage 1 | Round 2 | Repechage 2 | Quarterfinals | Semifinals | Final | |
| Athlete | Event | Time Speed (km/h) | Rank | Opposition Time Speed (km/h) | Opposition Time Speed (km/h) | Opposition Time Speed (km/h) | Opposition Time Speed (km/h) | Opposition Time Speed (km/h) | Opposition Time Speed (km/h) | Opposition Time Speed (km/h) | Rank |
|---|---|---|---|---|---|---|---|---|---|---|---|
| Simona Krupeckaitė | Women's sprint | 10.978; 65.585 | 10 Q | Meares (AUS); W 11.308; 63.671 | Bye | Ligtlee (NED); L | Cueff (FRA); Hansen (NZL); W 11.614; 61.994 | Marchant (GBR); L, L | Did not advance | 5th place final Zhong (CHN); Lee W S (HKG); Voynova (RUS); L | 7 |

Keirin

| Athlete | Event | 1st round | Repechage | 2nd round | Final |
| Athlete | Event | Rank | Rank | Rank | Rank |
|---|---|---|---|---|---|
| Simona Krupeckaitė | Women's keirin | 2 Q | Bye | 5 | 12 |

== Gymnastics ==
=== Artistic ===
Lithuania has entered one artistic gymnast into the Olympic competition. Robert Tvorogal had claimed his Olympic spot in the men's apparatus and all-around events at the Olympic Test Event in Rio de Janeiro.

Men

| Athlete | Event | Qualification | | | | | | | | Final | | | | | | | |
| Athlete | Event | Apparatus | | | | | | Total | Rank | Apparatus | | | | | | Total | Rank |
| Athlete | Event | F | PH | R | V | PB | HB | Total | Rank | F | PH | R | V | PB | HB | Total | Rank |
|---|---|---|---|---|---|---|---|---|---|---|---|---|---|---|---|---|---|
| Robert Tvorogal | All-around | 13.866 | 13.366 | 13.466 | 14.113 | 13.500 | 14.166 | 82.497 | 42 | Did not advance | | | | | | | |

== Judo ==
Lithuania has qualified one judoka for the women's heavyweight category (+78 kg) at the Games. Santa Pakenytė earned a continental quota spot from the European region as the highest-ranked Lithuanian judoka in the IJF World Ranking List of 30 May 2016.

| Athlete | Event | Round of 32 | Round of 16 | Quarterfinals | Semifinals | Repechage | Final / BM | |
| Athlete | Event | Opposition Result | Opposition Result | Opposition Result | Opposition Result | Opposition Result | Opposition Result | Rank |
|---|---|---|---|---|---|---|---|---|
| Santa Pakenytė | Women's +78 kg | Bye | Yamabe (JPN); L 000–100 | Did not advance | | | | |

== Modern pentathlon ==
Lithuania has qualified three modern pentathletes for the following events at the Games. Reigning London 2012 champion Laura Asadauskaitė sought an opportunity to defend her Olympic title in the women's event, after being crowned the 2015 UIPM World Cup champion in Minsk, Belarus. Meanwhile, Justinas Kinderis and Ieva Serapinaitė were ranked among the top 10 modern pentathletes, not yet qualified, in their respective events based on the UIPM World Rankings as of 1 June 2016.

| Athlete | Event | Fencing (épée one touch) | | | | Swimming (200 m freestyle) | | | Riding (show jumping) | | | Combined: shooting/running (10 m air pistol)/(3200 m) | | | Total points | Final rank |
| Athlete | Event | RR | BR | Rank | MP points | Time | Rank | MP points | Penalties | Rank | MP points | Time | Rank | MP Points | Total points | Final rank |
|---|---|---|---|---|---|---|---|---|---|---|---|---|---|---|---|---|
| Justinas Kinderis | Men's | 18–17 | 3 | 18 | 211 | 2:06.84 | 30 | 320 | EL | =33 | 0 | 11:27.33 | 15 | 613 | 1144 | 34 |
| Laura Asadauskaitė | Women's | 19–16 | 2 | 11 | 216 | 2:21.01 | 28 | 277 | EL | =31 | 0 | 12:01.01 OR | 1 | 579 | 1072 | 30 |
| Ieva Serapinaitė | Women's | 15–20 | 0 | 26 | 190 | 2:14.43 | 10 | 297 | 35 | 26 | 265 | 14:29.68 | 35 | 431 | 1183 | 28 |

== Rowing ==
Lithuania has qualified a total of five boats for each of the following classes into the Olympic regatta. Rowers competing in the single and double sculls (both men and women), as well as the men's quadruple sculls, had confirmed Olympic places for their boats at the 2015 FISA World Championships in Lac d'Aiguebelette, France.

Men

| Athlete | Event | Heats | | Repechage | | Quarterfinals | | Semifinals | | Final | |
| Athlete | Event | Time | Rank | Time | Rank | Time | Rank | Time | Rank | Time | Rank |
|---|---|---|---|---|---|---|---|---|---|---|---|
| Armandas Kelmelis | Single sculls | 7:34.59 | 5 R | 7:13.36 | 1 QF | 7:04.67 | 5 SC/D | 7:20.72 | 4 FD | 7:00.72 | 19 |
| Mindaugas Griškonis; Saulius Ritter | Double sculls | 6:29.11 | 1 SA/B | Bye | | —N/a | | 6:14.61 | 1 FA | 6:51.39 | 2nd place, silver medalist(s) |
| Aurimas Adomavičius; Martynas Džiaugys; Dominykas Jančionis; Dovydas Nemeravičius | Quadruple sculls | 5:58.70 | 5 R | 5:55.78 | 3 FB | —N/a | | | | 6:15.16 | 9 |

Women

| Athlete | Event | Heats | | Repechage | | Quarterfinals | | Semifinals | | Final | |
| Athlete | Event | Time | Rank | Time | Rank | Time | Rank | Time | Rank | Time | Rank |
|---|---|---|---|---|---|---|---|---|---|---|---|
| Lina Šaltytė | Single sculls | 8:35.92 | 3 QF | Bye | | 7:38.39 | 5 SC/D | 7:55.57 | 1 FC | 7:30.38 | 14 |
| Milda Valčiukaitė; Donata Vištartaitė | Double sculls | 7:04.82 | 1 SA/B | Bye | | —N/a | | 6:52.46 | 2 FA | 7:43.76 | 3rd place, bronze medalist(s) |

Qualification Legend: FA=Final A (medal); FB=Final B (non-medal); FC=Final C (non-medal); FD=Final D (non-medal); FE=Final E (non-medal); FF=Final F (non-medal); SA/B=Semifinals A/B; SC/D=Semifinals C/D; SE/F=Semifinals E/F; QF=Quarterfinals; R=Repechage

== Sailing ==
Lithuanian sailors have qualified one boat in each of the following classes through the 2014 ISAF Sailing World Championships, the individual fleet Worlds, and European qualifying regattas.

| Athlete | Event | Race | | | | | | | | | | | | | Net points | Final rank |
| Athlete | Event | 1 | 2 | 3 | 4 | 5 | 6 | 7 | 8 | 9 | 10 | 11 | 12 | M* | Net points | Final rank |
|---|---|---|---|---|---|---|---|---|---|---|---|---|---|---|---|---|
| Juozas Bernotas | Men's RS:X | 19 | 23 | 17 | 29 | ~~DNF~~ | 14 | 26 | DNF | 21 | UFD | 26 | 29 | EL | 278 | 26 |
| Gintarė Scheidt | Women's Laser Radial | ~~UFD~~ | 1 | 8 | 8 | 12 | 5 | 12 | 21 | 4 | 11 | —N/a | | 8 | 90 | 7 |

M = Medal race; DNF = Did not finish; UFD = "U" flag disqualification; EL = Eliminated – did not advance into the medal race;

== Shooting ==
Lithuania has received an invitation from ISSF to send Ronaldas Račinskas in the men's skeet to the Olympics, as long as the minimum qualifying score (MQS) was fulfilled by 31 March 2016.

| Athlete | Event | Qualification | | Semifinal | | Final | |
| Athlete | Event | Points | Rank | Points | Rank | Points | Rank |
|---|---|---|---|---|---|---|---|
| Ronaldas Račinskas | Men's skeet | 112 | 30 | Did not advance | | | |

Qualification Legend: Q = Qualify for the next round; q = Qualify for the bronze medal (shotgun)

== Swimming ==
Lithuanian swimmers have so far achieved qualifying standards in the following events (up to a maximum of 2 swimmers in each event at the Olympic Qualifying Time (OQT), and potentially 1 at the Olympic Selection Time (OST)):

Men

| Athlete | Event | Heat | | Semifinal | | Final | |
| Athlete | Event | Time | Rank | Time | Rank | Time | Rank |
|---|---|---|---|---|---|---|---|
| Simonas Bilis | 50 m freestyle | 22.01 NR | 14 Q | 21.71 NR | 6 Q | 22.08 | 8 |
| Simonas Bilis | 100 m freestyle | 49.16 | 30 | Did not advance | | | |
| Danas Rapšys | 100 m backstroke | 54.40 | 24 | Did not advance | | | |
| Danas Rapšys | 200 m backstroke | 1:59.58 | 21 | Did not advance | | | |
| Andrius Šidlauskas | 100 m breaststroke | 1:00.59 | 23 | Did not advance | | | |
| Giedrius Titenis | 100 m breaststroke | 59.90 | 12 Q | 59.80 | 10 | Did not advance | |
| Giedrius Titenis | 200 m breaststroke | 2:12.13 | 22 | Did not advance | | | |
| Simonas Bilis; Deividas Margevičius; Danas Rapšys; Giedrius Titenis | 4 × 100 m medley relay | 3:35.90 | 14 | —N/a | | Did not advance | |

Women

| Athlete | Event | Heat | | Semifinal | | Final | |
| Athlete | Event | Time | Rank | Time | Rank | Time | Rank |
|---|---|---|---|---|---|---|---|
| Rūta Meilutytė | 100 m breaststroke | 1:06.35 | 4 Q | 1:06.44 | 4 Q | 1:07.32 | 7 |

== Tennis ==
Lithuania has entered one tennis player for the first time into the Olympic tournament. Ričardas Berankis (world no. 54) qualified directly for the men's singles as one of the top 56 eligible players in the ATP World Rankings as of 6 June 2016.

| Athlete | Event | Round of 64 | Round of 32 | Round of 16 | Quarterfinals | Semifinals | Final / BM | |
| Athlete | Event | Opposition Score | Opposition Score | Opposition Score | Opposition Score | Opposition Score | Opposition Score | Rank |
|---|---|---|---|---|---|---|---|---|
| Ričardas Berankis | Men's singles | Millman (AUS); L 0–6, 0–6 | Did not advance | | | | | |

== Weightlifting ==
Lithuania has qualified one male weightlifter for the Olympics by virtue of his top 15 individual finish, among those who had not secured any quota places through the World or European Championships, in the IWF World Rankings as of 20 June 2016, signifying the nation's return to the sport after an eight-year hiatus. The place was awarded to rookie Aurimas Didžbalis in the men's middle-heavyweight division (94 kg).

| Athlete | Event | Snatch | | Clean & Jerk | | Total | Rank |
| Athlete | Event | Result | Rank | Result | Rank | Total | Rank |
|---|---|---|---|---|---|---|---|
| Aurimas Didžbalis | Men's −94 kg | 177 | =2 | 215 | 3 | 392 | 3rd place, bronze medalist(s) |

== Wrestling ==
Lithuania has qualified one wrestler for the men's Greco-Roman 66 kg into the Olympic competition as a result of his wrestle-off triumph at the initial meet of the World Qualification Tournament in Ulaanbaatar.

Key:

- VT – Victory by Fall.
- PP – Decision by Points – the loser with technical points.
- PO – Decision by Points – the loser without technical points.
- ST – Decision by points – the loser without technical points and a margin of victory of at least 8 (Greco-Roman) or 10 (freestyle) points.

Men's Greco-Roman

| Athlete | Event | Qualification | Round of 16 | Quarterfinal | Semifinal | Repechage 1 | Repechage 2 | Final / BM | |
| Athlete | Event | Opposition Result | Opposition Result | Opposition Result | Opposition Result | Opposition Result | Opposition Result | Opposition Result | Rank |
|---|---|---|---|---|---|---|---|---|---|
| Edgaras Venckaitis | −66 kg | Bye | Stäbler (GER); L 1–3 ^{PP} | Did not advance | | | | | 11 |

== See also ==
- Lithuania at the 2016 Summer Paralympics
