= Rowing at the 2016 Summer Olympics – Women's double sculls =

Women's double sculls at the Games of the XXXI Olympiad
- Venue: Rodrigo de Freitas Lagoon
- Date: 6–11 August 2016
- Competitors: 26 from 13 nations
- Winning time: 7:40.10

Medalists
1st place, gold medalist(s)		Magdalena Fularczyk-Kozłowska; Natalia Madaj	Poland
2nd place, silver medalist(s)		Victoria Thornley; Katherine Grainger	Great Britain
3rd place, bronze medalist(s)		Donata Vištartaitė; Milda Valčiukaitė	Lithuania

The women's double sculls competition at the 2016 Summer Olympics in Rio de Janeiro was held on 6–11 August at the Lagoon Rodrigo de Freitas.

The medals for the competition were presented by Nenad Lalović, Serbia, member of the International Olympic Committee, and the gifts were presented by Lenka Dientsbach-Wech, Germany, Member of the Executive Committee of the International Rowing Federation.

== Results ==
=== Heats ===
First three of each heat qualify to the semifinals, remainder goes to the repechage.

==== Heat 1 ====
Rank	Rower	Country	Time	Notes
1	Donata Vištartaitė; Milda Valčiukaitė	Lithuania	7:04.82	SF
2	Victoria Thornley; Katherine Grainger	Great Britain	7:05.32	SF
3	Hélène Lefebvre; Elodie Ravera-Scaramozzino	France	7:05.65	SF
4	Marie-Cathérine Arnold; Mareike Adams	Germany	7:13.49	R
5	Lisbet Jakobsen; Nina Hollensen	Denmark	7:18.92	R

==== Heat 2 ====
Rank	Rower	Country	Time	Notes
1	Magdalena Fularczyk-Kozłowska; Natalia Madaj	Poland	7:16.16	SF
2	Lü Yang; Zhu Weiwei	China	7:25.19	SF
3	Yuliya Bichyk; Tatsiana Kukhta	Belarus	7:27.22	SF
4	Meghan O'Leary; Ellen Tomek	United States	7:46.92	R

==== Heat 3 ====
Rank	Rower	Country	Time	Notes
1	Eve Macfarlane; Zoe Stevenson	New Zealand	7:14.31	SF
2	Sally Kehoe; Genevieve Horton	Australia	7:17.34	SF
3	Aikaterini Nikolaidou; Sofia Asoumanaki	Greece	7:20.64	SF
4	Kristýna Fleissnerová; Lenka Antošová	Czech Republic	7:35.85	R

=== Repechage ===
First three of heat qualify to the semifinals.

==== Heat 1 ====
Rank	Rower	Country	Time	Notes
1	Marie-Cathérine Arnold; Mareike Adams	Germany	7:00.54	SF
2	Meghan O'Leary; Ellen Tomek	United States	7:00.60	SF
3	Kristýna Fleissnerová; Lenka Antošová	Czech Republic	7:03.68	SF
4	Lisbet Jakobsen; Nina Hollensen	Denmark	7:04.35	

=== Semifinals ===
First three of each heat qualify to the Final A, remainder goes to the Final B.

==== Semifinal 1 ====
Rank	Rower	Country	Time	Notes
1	Aikaterini Nikolaidou; Sofia Asoumanaki	Greece	6:51.99	FA
2	Donata Vištartaitė; Milda Valčiukaitė	Lithuania	6:52.46	FA
3	Meghan O'Leary; Ellen Tomek	United States	6:52.92	FA
4	Eve Macfarlane; Zoe Stevenson	New Zealand	6:52.97	FB
5	Marie-Cathérine Arnold; Mareike Adams	Germany	6:58.70	FB
6	Lü Yang; Zhu Weiwei	China	7:05.31	FB

==== Semifinal 2 ====
Rank	Rower	Country	Time	Notes
1	Magdalena Fularczyk-Kozłowska; Natalia Madaj	Poland	6:50.63	FA
2	Victoria Thornley; Katherine Grainger	Great Britain	6:52.47	FA
3	Hélène Lefebvre; Elodie Ravera-Scaramozzino	France	6:54.34	FA
4	Sally Kehoe; Genevieve Horton	Australia	6:55.37	FB
5	Yuliya Bichyk; Tatsiana Kukhta	Belarus	6:57.64	FB
6	Kristýna Fleissnerová; Lenka Antošová	Czech Republic	7:03.79	FB

=== Final ===
==== Final B ====
Rank	Rower	Country	Time	Notes
1	Marie-Cathérine Arnold; Mareike Adams	Germany	7:39.82	
2	Yuliya Bichyk; Tatsiana Kukhta	Belarus	7:40.48	
3	Sally Kehoe; Genevieve Horton	Australia	7:42.30	
4	Kristýna Fleissnerová; Lenka Antošová	Czech Republic	7:43.77	
5	Lü Yang; Zhu Weiwei	China	7:45.68	
6	Eve Macfarlane; Zoe Stevenson	New Zealand	7:50.74	

==== Final A ====
Rank	Rower	Country	Time	Notes
1st place, gold medalist(s)	Magdalena Fularczyk-Kozłowska; Natalia Madaj	Poland	7:40.10	
2nd place, silver medalist(s)	Victoria Thornley; Katherine Grainger	Great Britain	7:41.05	
3rd place, bronze medalist(s)	Donata Vištartaitė; Milda Valčiukaitė	Lithuania	7:43.76	
4	Aikaterini Nikolaidou; Sofia Asoumanaki	Greece	7:48.62	
5	Hélène Lefebvre; Elodie Ravera-Scaramozzino	France	7:52.03	
6	Meghan O'Leary; Ellen Tomek	United States	8:06.18	
