= Olivia Loe =

New Zealand rower

Personal information
- Born: 15 January 1992 (age 34)
- Height: 1.70 m (5 ft 7 in)
- Weight: 74 kg (163 lb)
- Relative: Richard Loe (father)

Sport
- Country: New Zealand
- Sport: Rowing
- Event(s): Double sculls, Quadruple sculls, Coxless four
Medal record
Women's rowing
Representing New Zealand
World Championships
Gold medal – first place	2017 Sarasota	Double sculls
Gold medal – first place	2019 Ottensheim	Double sculls
Silver medal – second place	2018 Plovdiv	Double sculls
World Championships (U23)
Silver medal – second place	2014 Varese	Coxless four
Bronze medal – third place	2012 Trakai	Quadruple sculls

Olivia Loe (born 15 January 1992) is a former New Zealand representative rower. She is a two-time world champion in the double scull and was world champion winning gold at the 2019 World Rowing Championships with Brooke Donoghue. She was selected in the New Zealand senior squad for the 2020 Summer Olympics but in a surprise move at the final crew selections Loe was replaced in the double scull by Hannah Osborne and was selected, instead, to race in the New Zealand women's quad-scull.

== Early life and sporting pedigree ==
Loe was born in 1992 in New Zealand. Her father is Richard Loe, a prominent rugby union player with 49 appearances for the All Blacks. Olivia's elder sister Jessica (born 1989) has also represented New Zealand internationally in rowing. After Jessica took up rowing in 2004, Olivia followed her in 2006. The sisters' club rowing has been with the Avon Rowing Club in Christchurch and both attended St Margaret's College. Apart from rowing, Olivia Loe plays rugby union.

== International rowing career ==
Loe first competed in rowing internationally in 2010, when she attended the World Rowing Junior Championships in Račice, Czech Republic. She came 11th with the junior women's quadruple sculls. In the 2011 trials at Lake Karapiro to determine the country's squad, she teamed up with Jennifer Storey, the younger sister of John Storey. At the 2011 World Rowing U23 Championships in Amsterdam in the Netherlands, she came fourth with the U23 women's quadruple sculls. At the 2012 World Rowing U23 Championships in Trakai, Lithuania, she won a bronze medal with the U23 women's quadruple sculls. At the 2013 World Rowing U23 Championships in Linz, Austria, she came fifth with the U23 women's quadruple sculls. At the 2014 World Rowing U23 Championships in Varese, Italy, she won a silver medal with the U23 women's four.

In the 2015 season, Loe competed at World Rowing Cups in Italy and Switzerland in the women's single sculls, but she did not compete at the 2015 World Rowing Championships. In the 2016 season, Loe competed at World Rowing Cups in Switzerland and Poland in the women's pair as New Zealand's reserve boat to Genevieve Behrent and Rebecca Scown. This being an Olympic year, her class was not raced at the 2016 World Rowing Championships, but she did not qualify for the Olympics either; Behrent and Scown won Olympic silver for New Zealand in that class.

In the 2017 season, Loe competed at World Rowing Cups in Poland and Switzerland in the women's double sculls with Brooke Donoghue, and they won gold in both races. At the 2017 World Rowing Championships in Sarasota, Florida, she became world champion in the women's double sculls partnered with Donoghue. She regained that title with Donoghue at the 2019 World Rowing Championships in Linz. Loe announced her retirement from elite Rowing on 19 April 2022.
