= Marie-Cathérine Arnold =

German rower (born 1991)

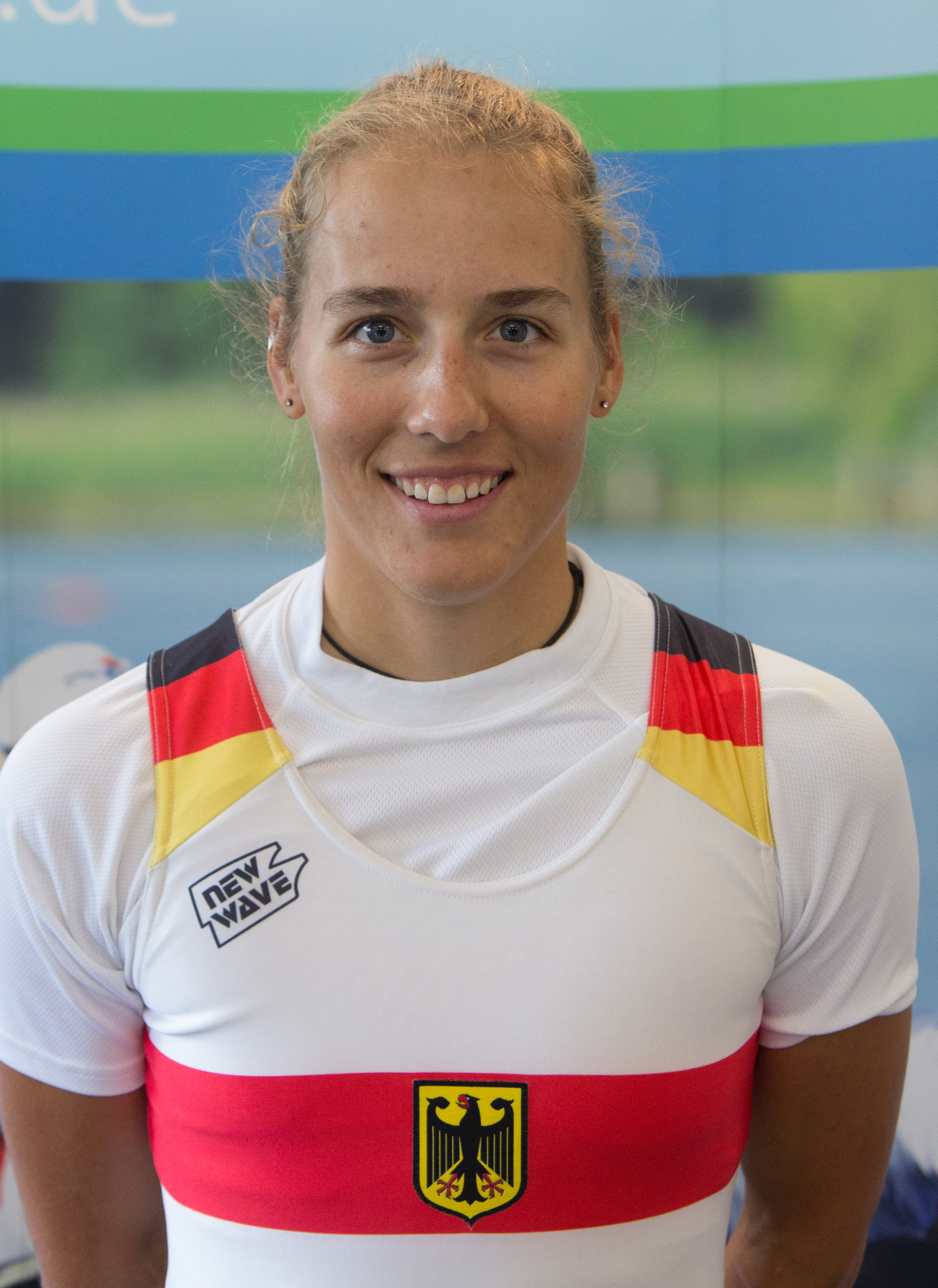

Personal information
- Born: 7 November 1991 (age 34) Ahlten, Germany
Medal record
Women's rowing
Representing Germany
World Championships
Silver medal – second place	2018 Plovdiv	W4x
Silver medal – second place	2015 Aiguebelette	W4x
European Championships
Silver medal – second place	2020 Poznań	W8+
Gold medal – first place	2016 Brandenburg	W4x
Gold medal – first place	2015 Poznań	W4x
Silver medal – second place	2014 Belgrade	W4x

Marie-Cathérine Arnold (born 7 November 1991) is a German rower. She competed in the 2015 European Rowing Championships in Poznań winning a gold medal. At the 2016 Summer Olympics in Rio de Janeiro, she competed in the women's double sculls with teammate Mareike Adams. They finished in 7th place.
