= Rowing at the 2014 Asian Games – Women's double sculls =

Women's double sculls at the 2014 Asian Games
- Venue: Tangeum Lake
- Date: 20–24 September 2014
- Competitors: 8 from 4 nations

Medalists
gold medal	Duan Jingli; Lü Yang	China
silver medal	Mariya Vassilyeva; Svetlana Germanovich	Kazakhstan
bronze medal	Rojjana Raklao; Phuttharaksa Neegree	Thailand

The women's double sculls competition at the 2014 Asian Games in Chungju, South Korea was held from 20 September to 24 September at the Tangeum Lake International Rowing Center.

== Schedule ==
All times are Korea Standard Time (UTC+09:00)

Date	Time	Event
Saturday, 20 September 2014	10:30	Heat
Wednesday, 24 September 2014	11:15	Final

== Results ==
=== Heat ===
- Qualification: 1–4 → Final (FA)

Rank	Team	Time	Notes
1	China (CHN); Duan Jingli; Lü Yang	7:21.42	FA
2	Kazakhstan (KAZ); Mariya Vassilyeva; Svetlana Germanovich	7:24.88	FA
3	Thailand (THA); Rojjana Raklao; Phuttharaksa Neegree	7:27.73	FA
4	Chinese Taipei (TPE); Lee Pei-chen; Chiu Pei-yu	7:33.14	FA

=== Final ===
Rank	Team	Time
1st place, gold medalist(s)	China (CHN); Duan Jingli; Lü Yang	7:33.23
2nd place, silver medalist(s)	Kazakhstan (KAZ); Mariya Vassilyeva; Svetlana Germanovich	7:46.71
3rd place, bronze medalist(s)	Thailand (THA); Rojjana Raklao; Phuttharaksa Neegree	7:58.78
4	Chinese Taipei (TPE); Lee Pei-chen; Chiu Pei-yu	8:03.51
