= Tontodonati =

Tontodonati is an Italian surname, primarily associated with the provinces of Pescara and L'Aquila in south-central Italy. Notable people with the surname include:

- Federico Tontodonati (born 1989), Italian racewalker
- Giuseppe Tontodonati (1917–1989), Italian poet
- Kiri Tontodonati (born 1994), Italian rower
- Letizia Tontodonati (born 1999), Italian rower
- Mario Tontodonati (1923–2009), Italian footballer
- Valentino Tontodonati (born 1959), Italian rower
