= Lisbet Jakobsen =

Danish rower (born 1987)

Medal record

Women's rowing

Representing Denmark

World Rowing Championships
Bronze medal – third place	2008 Linz	W4-

Lisbet Jakobsen (born 21 January 1987 in Nexø) is a Danish rower.

Jacobsen competed at the 2016 Summer Olympics in the double sculls event. She also won a bronze medal at the 2008 World Rowing Championships.
