= Mareike Adams =

German rower

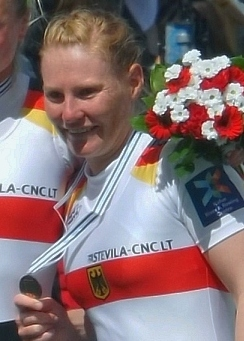

Personal information
- Born: 27 February 1990 (age 36) Wetzlar, West Germany
Medal record
Women's rowing
Representing Germany
World Championships
Bronze medal – third place	2015 Aiguebelette	W2x

Mareike Adams (born 27 February 1990) is a German rower. She competed in the 2015 World Rowing Championships winning a bronze medal. At the 2016 Summer Olympics in Rio de Janeiro, she competed in the women's double sculls with teammate Marie-Cathérine Arnold. They finished in 7th place.
