= Kiri Tontodonati =

Italian rower

Kiri English-Hawke
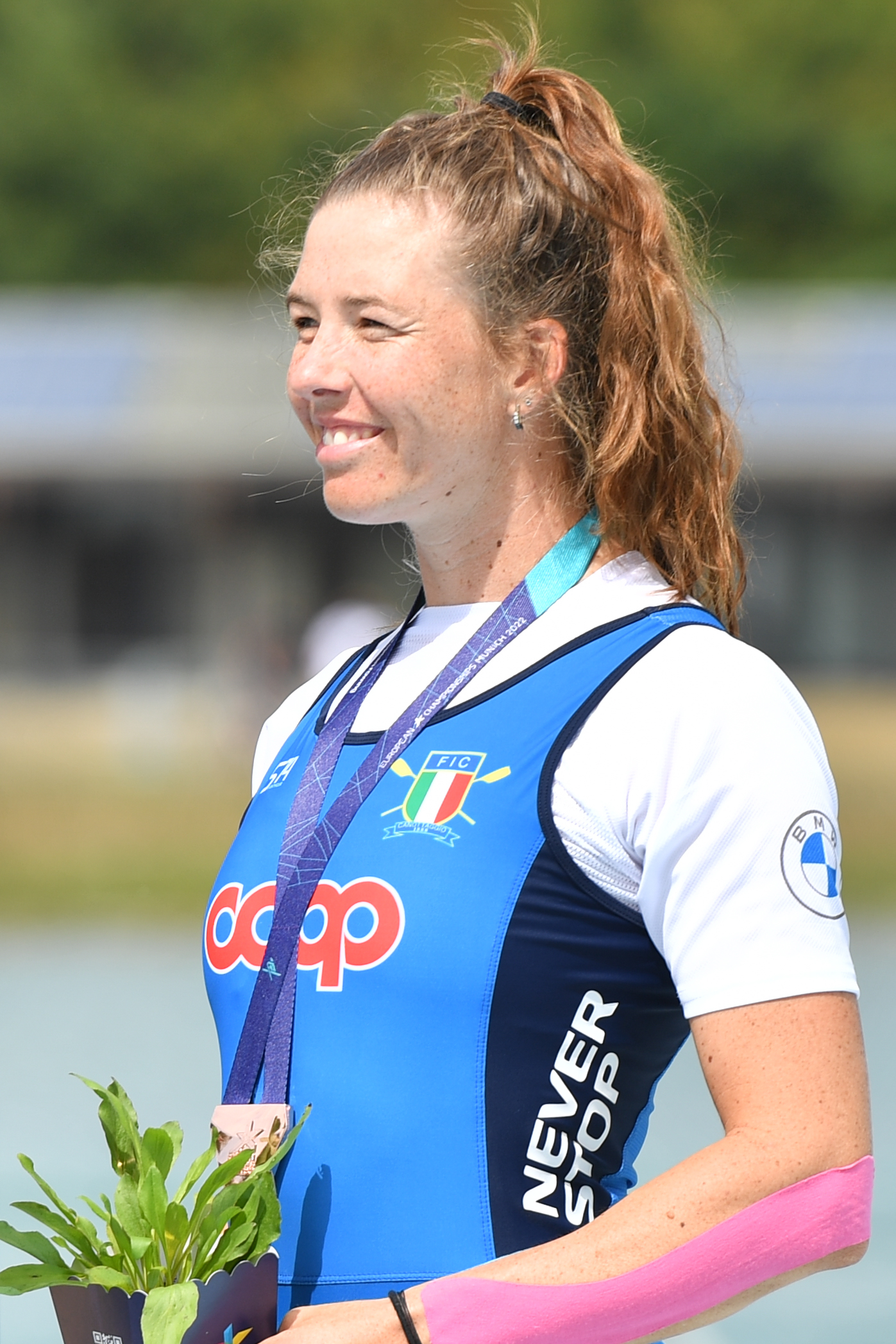
- English-Hawke in 2022.

Personal information
- National team: Italy
- Born: 4 September 1994 (age 31) Canberra, Australia
- Height: 178 cm (5 ft 10 in)
- Weight: 68 kg (150 lb)

Sport
- Sport: Rowing
- Club: CUS Torino; Fiamme Oro
- Coached by: Mauro Tontodonati, Valter Molea
Medal record
Women's rowing
Representing Italy
European Championships
Bronze medal – third place	2022 Munich	Double sculls
Event	1st	2nd	3rd
European Championships	0	1	3
Mediterranean Games	0	1	0
Total	0	2	3

Kiri English-Hawke (born 4 September 1994), previously known as Kiri Tontodonati, is an Italian rower three times bronze medal winner and once silver medal winner at senior level at the European Rowing Championships. She competed at the 2020 Summer Olympics, in the Pair.

== Biography ==
Kiri, an Australian by birth, became an Italian citizen in 2018. She competed at the Tokyo Olympics in the pair and has competed at a number of world rowing championships in the pair and double.

== Achievements ==
Year	Competition	Venue	Rank	Event	Time
2017	World Championships	(United States) Sarasota	9th	Double skulls	7:07.52
2018	European Junior Championships	(Bulgaria) Plovdiv	15th	Coxeless four	6:58.17
2019	European Championships	(Switzerland) Lucerne	3rd	Coxless pair	7:16.22
2019	World Championships	(Japan) Tokyo	6th	Coxless pair	7:40.35

== See also ==
- Tontodonati
