= Stefania Buttignon =

Italian female rower

Personal information
- National team: Italy
- Born: 7 July 1997 (age 28) Monfalcone, Italy

Sport
- Sport: Rowing
- Club: Timavo S.C.
- Start activity: 2012
Medal record
Event	1st	2nd	3rd
European Championships	0	0	1

Stefania Buttignon (born 7 July 1997) is an Italian female rower, bronze medal winner at senior level at the European Rowing Championships.
