= Genevra Stone =

American rower

Personal information
- Full name: Genevra Lea Stone
- Born: July 11, 1985 (age 40)
- Height: 6 ft 0 in (183 cm)

Sport
- Country: United States of America
- Sport: Rowing
- Event: Women's single sculls
- Club: Cambridge Boat Club
- Coached by: Gregg Stone
Medal record
Women's rowing
Representing United States
Olympic Games
Silver medal – second place	2016 Rio de Janeiro	Single sculls
World Rowing Cup
Silver medal – second place	2016 World Rowing Cup II	Single sculls
Bronze medal – third place	2015 World Rowing Cup III	Single sculls
Silver medal – second place	2015 World Rowing Cup II	Single sculls

Genevra Lea 'Gevvie' Stone (born July 11, 1985) is an Olympic American rower from Newton, Massachusetts. She is a graduate of Princeton University and Tufts University School of Medicine.

== Biography ==
Stone was born on July 11, 1985, and grew up in Newton, Massachusetts. She began rowing in 2001 at the Winsor School. Stone graduated from Winsor in 2003, and she continued to row at Princeton University where she graduated in 2007. She attended Tufts University School of Medicine while training for the London 2012 and Rio 2016 Olympic Games, graduating with her M.D. in 2014. She is currently an emergency medicine resident at Beth Israel Deaconess Medical Center.

== Family ==
Her mother, Lisa Hansen, was also an Olympic rower, competing in the women's coxed quadruple sculls at the 1976 Olympics in Montreal. Her father, Gregg Stone, was the top U.S. single sculler in 1980 and would have been an Olympian himself if the U.S. had not boycotted the 1980 Olympics in Moscow. Both of her parents were members of the U.S. National Rowing Team. When Stone was in high school, her mother Lisa coached her along with her high school team at the Winsor School, and Lisa continues to be Winsor's rowing coach today. Her father Gregg is now her coach.

== Olympic Games ==
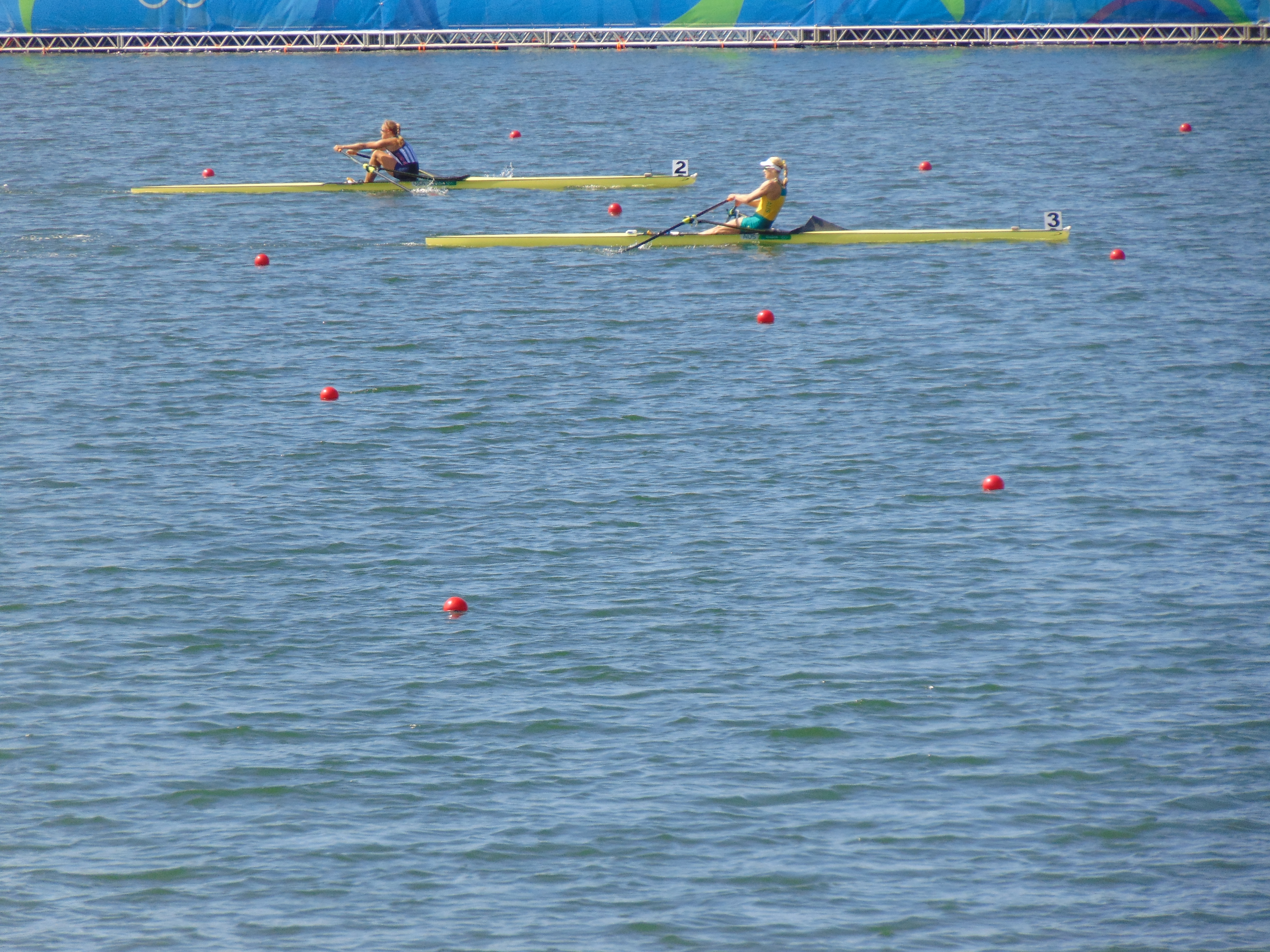
At the 2016 Olympics (left)

At the 2016 Summer Olympics, Stone won the silver medal in the single sculls. She also competed in the single sculls at the 2012 Summer Olympics, where she placed 1st in Final B and 7th overall. She qualified for the 2020 Olympics in the double sculls.

== World Championships ==
In 2011, Stone placed 13th in women's single sculls at the World Rowing Cup III and 11th in the women's single sculls at the World Rowing Championships. In 2012, she placed 3rd in women's quadruple sculls at the Final Olympic Qualification Regatta and 8th in women's single sculls at the World Rowing Cup II. Two years later in 2014, Stone placed 4th in the World Rowing Championship. In 2015, she placed 2nd in the World Rowing Cup II, 3rd in the World Rowing Cup III, and 4th in the World Rowing Championships all for women's single sculls. In 2016, she placed 2nd in the World Rowing Cup II for women's single sculls before winning silver in Rio.

== Head of the Charles ==
In 2018, Stone won the women's Championship Singles race at the Head of the Charles Regatta for the ninth time and the fifth year in a row. Several years earlier in the 2002 Head of the Charles, she and her boat from the Winsor School won the women's Youth 4+. In 2005 and 2006 her Princeton boat won the women's Championship 8+ in the Head of the Charles, and in 2017 she rowed in the winning composite crew formed of international scullers.

== See also ==
- List of Princeton University Olympians
