= Lü Yang =

Chinese rower (born 1993)

Personal information
- Nationality: Chinrese
- Born: 26 November 1993 (age 32) Luohe, China
- Height: 1.83 m (6 ft 0 in)
- Weight: 77 kg (170 lb)

Sport
- Country: China
- Sport: Rowing
- Event(s): Double sculls, Quadruple sculls
Medal record
Women's rowing
Representing China
Olympic Games
Gold medal – first place	2020 Tokyo	Quadruple sculls
World Championships
Gold medal – first place	2019 Ottensheim	Quadruple sculls
Gold medal – first place	2022 Račice	Quadruple sculls
Silver medal – second place	2014 Amsterdam	Quadruple sculls
Bronze medal – third place	2023 Belgrade	Quadruple sculls
Asian Games
Gold medal – first place	2014 Incheon	Double sculls
Gold medal – first place	2022 Hangzhou	Quadruple sculls
Asian Championships
Gold medal – first place	2015 Beijing	Quadruple sculls

Lü Yang (Chinese: 吕扬; pinyin: Lǚ Yáng; born 26 November 1993) is a Chinese rower. She competed in the women's double sculls event at the 2016 Summer Olympics.

On 28 July 2021, she and three teammates won the gold medal in women's quadruple sculls at the 2020 Summer Olympics in Tokyo with 6:05.13, setting the new WB. It was the second time that China won the Olympic gold medal in the event.
