= Aikaterini Nikolaidou =

Greek rower (born 1992)

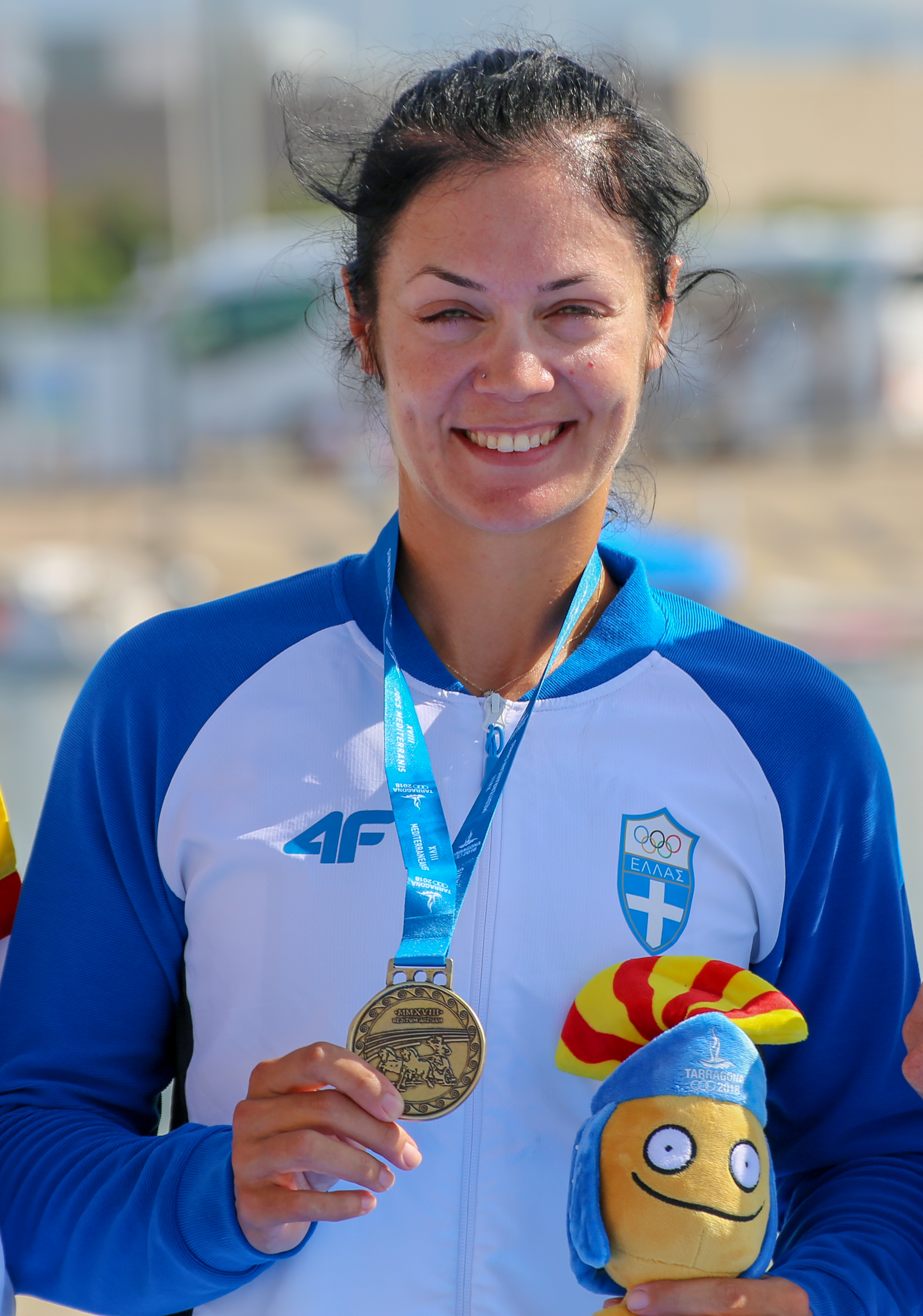
- Nikolaidou in 2018

Personal information
- Born: 22 October 1992 (age 33) Katerini, Greece
- Height: 1.80 m (5 ft 11 in)
- Weight: 70 kg (154 lb)

Sport
- Country: Greece
- Sport: Rowing
- Events: Women's lightweight single sculls, Women's single sculls, Women's double sculls, Women's quadruple sculls
- Club: Nautical Club of Katerini (NOKAT)
Medal record
Women's rowing
Representing Greece
World Championships
Silver medal – second place	2013 Chungju	LW1x
Silver medal – second place	2014 Amsterdam	LW1x
Silver medal – second place	2015 Aiguebelette	W2x
European Championships
Gold medal – first place	2013 Seville	LW1x
Gold medal – first place	2014 Belgrade	LW1x
World Rowing U23 Championships
Gold medal – first place	2013 Linz-Ottensheim	BLW1x
Silver medal – second place	2012 Trakai	BW2x
Silver medal – second place	2014 Varese	BLW1x
World Rowing Junior Championships
Bronze medal – third place	2010 Racice	JW1x
Mediterranean Games
Gold medal – first place	2013 Mersin	LW1x
Gold medal – first place	2018 Tarragona	W1x

Aikaterini "Katerina" Nikolaidou (Greek: Αικατερίνη "Κατερίνα" Νικολαΐδου; born 22 October 1992) is a Greek rower. Nikolaidou represented Greece, along with Sofia Asoumanaki at the 2016 Summer Olympics in Rio de Janeiro, Brazil, finishing in the 4th place (double sculls). She also won a silver medal, in the lightweight single sculls at the 2013 World Rowing Championships and 2014 World Rowing Championships, and in the lightweight double sculls along with Sofia Asoumanaki at the 2015 World Rowing Championships. She won the gold medal in the lightweight single sculls at the 2014 European Champion and 2013 European Champion. She won the gold medal in the single sculls, at the 2018 Mediterranean Games in Tarragona, and at the 2013 Mediterranean Games in Mersin.

Before joining the Greek National Team of Rowing, she was a swimming athlete. In 2007 as a rower athlete member she joined Nautical Club of Katerini (NOKAT), in Katerini. Her father Yiannis Nikolaidis was a rower athlete.

In 2016, she was admitted to the School of Physical Education and Sports Science (TEFAA) of the Aristotle University of Thessaloniki. In 2021, she started studying at the private institute of vocational training IEK ALFA for the 2-year sports coaching programme.

Katerina Nikolaidou was awarded the Best (Top) Greek Female Athlete Award for 2014 on 15 December 2014, the Best (Top) Greek Female Athlete Award for 2013 on 16 December 2013, which they from the Panhellenic Association of Sports Journalists (PSAT) at its annual awards event PSAT Sports Awards took place in the Melina Mercouri Hall of the Peace and Friendship Stadium in Piraeus.

== Personal life ==
She married on 19 February 2023 in Katerini.
