= Jitka Antošová =

Czech rower (born 1987)

Personal information
- Born: 13 March 1987 (age 39) Děčín, Czech Republic
- Height: 175 cm (5 ft 9 in)
- Weight: 73 kg (161 lb)
- Relatives: Lenka Antošová (sister)

Sport
- Sport: Rowing
Medal record
Women's rowing
Representing the Czech Republic
European Rowing Championships
Gold medal – first place	2007 Poznań	Double scull
Silver medal – second place	2009 Brest	Double scull

Jitka Antošová (born 13 March 1987) is a Czech rower. She competed at the 2008 Summer Olympics in Beijing with the women's double sculls where they came sixth. At the 2012 Summer Olympics in London, she competed in the women's double sculls with her sister Lenka as rowing partner.
