= Leonie Menzel =

German rower (born 1999)

- Leonie Menzel (3rd left) at Paris 2024

Personal information
- Nationality: German
- Born: 19 May 1999 (age 27) Mettmann, North Rhine-Westphalia, Germany

Sport
- Sport: Rowing
Medal record
Women's rowing
Representing Germany
European Championships
Bronze medal – third place	2024 Szeged	Quadruple sculls

Leonie Menzel (born 19 May 1999) is a German rower. She competed in the women's double sculls event at the 2020 Summer Olympics.
