= Meghan O'Leary =

American rower

Personal information
- Born: August 24, 1984 (age 42) Tulsa, Oklahoma, United States
- Education: University of Virginia (Jefferson Scholar)
- Height: 6 ft (183 cm)
- Weight: 162 lb (73 kg)

Sport
- Sport: Rowing
Medal record
Women's rowing
Representing United States
World Championships
| Silver medal – second place | 2017 Sarasota | Double sculls |

Meghan O'Leary (born August 24, 1984 in Tulsa, Oklahoma) is an American Olympic rower. Having represented the United States twice at Rio 2016 Summer Olympic Games, and at Tokyo 2020, O'Leary is a three-time World Cup medalist. She currently serves on the USRowing Board of Directors.

She attended the University of Virginia as a Jefferson Scholar, where she played volleyball and softball.

She competed at the 2016 Summer Olympics in Rio de Janeiro, in the women's double sculls.

She has qualified to represent the United States at the 2020 Summer Olympics.
