= Lisa Scheenaard =

Dutch rower (born 1988)

Personal information
- Nationality: Dutch
- Born: 5 September 1988 (age 37) Weert, Netherlands
- Height: 1.79 m (5 ft 10 in)
- Weight: 70 kg (154 lb)

Sport
- Country: Netherlands
- Sport: Rowing
- Event: Double sculls
Medal record
Women's Rowing
Representing Netherlands
Olympic Games
Bronze medal – third place	2020 Tokyo	Double sculls
World Championships
Bronze medal – third place	2019 Ottensheim	Double sculls
European Championships
Silver medal – second place	2023 Bled	Quadruple sculls
Silver medal – second place	2020 Poznan	Double sculls
Silver medal – second place	2018 Glasgow	Double sculls
Silver medal – second place	2017 Račice	Double sculls
Silver medal – second place	2013 Seville	Quadruple sculls

Lisa Scheenaard (born 5 September 1988) is a Dutch rower, who competed at the Olympic Games.

== Rowing ==
In 2016, Scheenaard won the Princess Royal Challenge Cup (the premier women's singles sculls event) at the Henley Royal Regatta, rowing for the Hollandia Roeiclub.

Scheenaard won a bronze medal at the 2019 World Rowing Championships and a silver medal at the 2020 European Rowing Championships.

She won the bronze medal at the 2020 Summer Olympics in the double sculls event together with Roos de Jong.

== Cycling ==
In 2018, 2020, and 2022 she was the champion at the Dutch Headwind Cycling Championships, held in storm conditions at Oosterscheldekering over an 8.5 km course against the North Sea wind on upright single-speed bikes. In 2018 she battled "Moderate gale" force 7 winds to complete the distance in 20 minutes 28 seconds. In 2020 she completed the course in 23 minutes 8 seconds while facing "Fresh gale" force 8 (code orange) winds. In 2022 she battled "Moderate gale" force 7 winds to complete the distance in 22 minutes 53 seconds.
