= Ellen Tomek =

American rower

Medal record

Women's rowing

Representing United States

World Championships
Silver medal – second place	2017 Sarasota	Double sculls
Bronze medal – third place	2018 Plovdiv	Double sculls

Ellen Tomek (born May 1, 1984, in Flint, Michigan) is an American rower. Along with Megan Kalmoe she finished 5th in the women's double sculls at the 2008 Summer Olympics.

She has qualified to represent the United States at the 2020 Summer Olympics. She is openly lesbian.
