= Anneta Kyridou =

Greek rower (born 1998)

Personal information
- Nationality: Greek
- Born: 30 October 1998 (age 27) Thessaloniki, Greece
- Height: 1.80 m (5 ft 11 in)

Sport
- Sport: Rowing
Medal record
Women's rowing
Representing Greece
European Championships
Bronze medal – third place	2020 Poznan	Single sculls
World Rowing U23 Championships
Gold medal – first place	2019 Sarasota	BW2X
Bronze medal – third place	2017 Plovdiv	BW2X
European Rowing U23 Championships
Gold medal – first place	2019 Ioannina	BW1X
Gold medal – first place	2020 Duisburg	BW1X
Silver medal – second place	2018 Brest	BW2X
World Rowing Junior Championships
Silver medal – second place	2016 Rotterdam	JW2X
European Rowing Junior Championships
Silver medal – second place	2016 Trakai	JW2X

Anneta Kyridou (Greek: Αννέτα Κυρίδου; born 30 October 1998) is a Greek rower from Thessaloniki. She competed in the 2020 Summer Olympics, taking the 10th place. She is the sister of Maria Kyridou.
