= Donata Karalienė =

Lithuanian rower (born 1989)

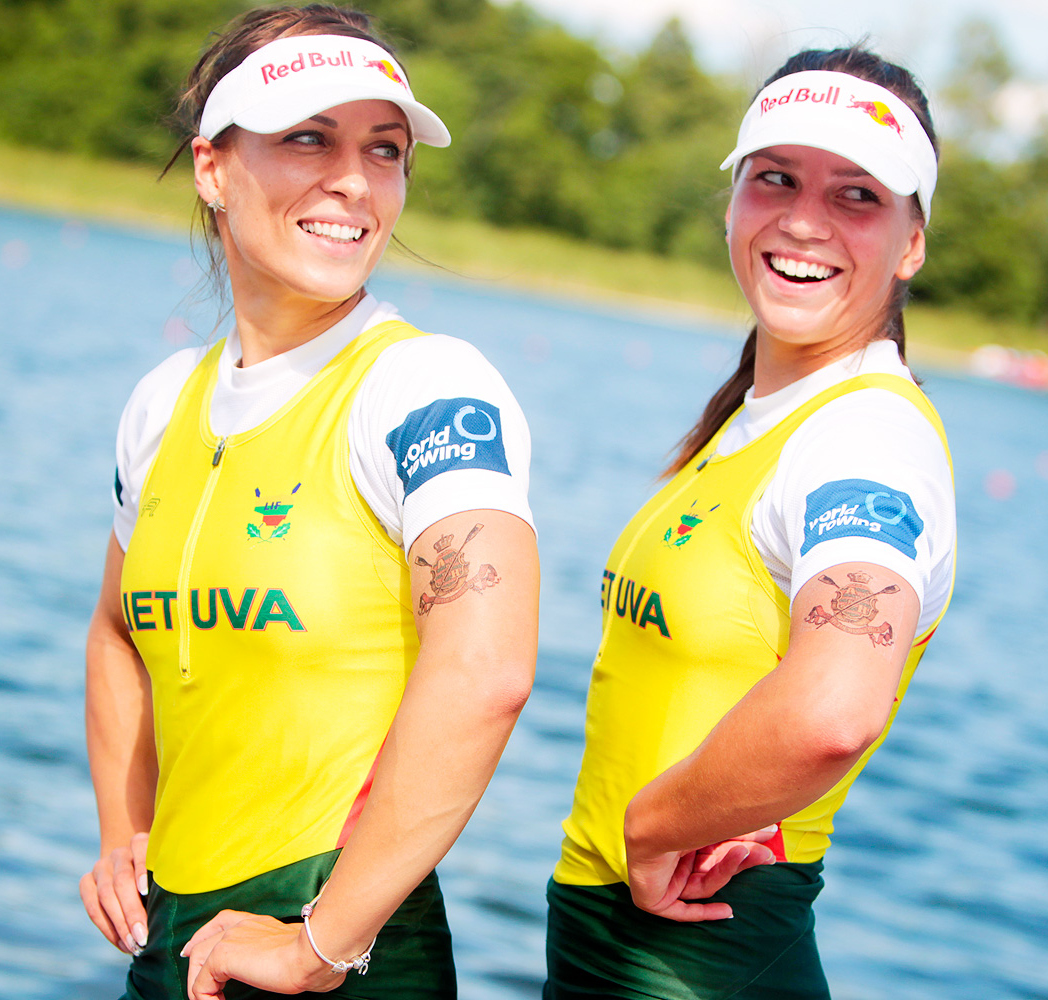
- Karalienė (left) and Milda Valčiukaitė

Personal information
- Born: Donata Vištartaitė; 11 June 1989 (age 37) Gūbriai, Lithuania
- Height: 171 cm (5 ft 7 in)
- Weight: 65 kg (143 lb)

Sport
- Country: Lithuania
- Sport: Rowing
Medal record
Women's rowing
Representing Lithuania
Olympic Games
Bronze medal – third place	2016 Rio de Janeiro	Double sculls
World Championships
Gold medal – first place	2013 Chungju	W2x
Silver medal – second place	2023 Belgrade	W2x
European Championships
Gold medal – first place	2012 Varese	W1x
Gold medal – first place	2013 Sevilla	W2x
Silver medal – second place	2014 Belgrade	W2x
Silver medal – second place	2021 Varese	W2x
Silver medal – second place	2023 Bled	W2x
Silver medal – second place	2024 Szeged	W2x
Bronze medal – third place	2011 Plovdiv	W1x
World U23 Championships
Gold medal – first place	2010 Brest	W1x
Gold medal – first place	2011 Amsterdam	W1x
Summer Universiade
Gold medal – first place	2015 Gwangju	W2x

Donata Karalienė (née Vištartaitė, born 11 June 1989) is a Lithuanian rower and Olympic bronze medalist at the Rio 2016 Games. She is also known for winning gold medals at the 2013 World Rowing Championships, and the 2012 and 2013 European Rowing Championships.

== Career ==
Karalienė, competing under her maiden name Vištartaitė, had a successful junior career, finishing 6th at her first Junior World Championships in 2006, and following that by winning a bronze medal at the 2007 World Junior Championships and gold at the 2010 and 2011 Under 23 World Championships.

Karalienė won the women's single sculls at the 2012 European Championships, having won bronze the year before.

Switching to the double sculls, Karalienė teamed up with Milda Valčiukaitė. The pair went unbeaten in their first season, winning the 2013 World Championships and the 2013 European Championships. Following this, the team narrowly missed out on a medal at the 2014 World Championships, but won the silver medal at the 2014 and 2015 European Championships.

At the 2016 Summer Olympics, Karalienė and Valčiukaitė won the bronze medal in the women's double sculls, Lithuania's first women's rowing medal since 2000.

== Biography ==
Karalienė was originally a track athlete, competing in the middle-distance events. When her coach stopped coaching, she continued without support. A rowing coach visited her home town looking for talented athletes with the potential to become rowers. He convinced her to take up rowing. She was very successful, winning the Lithuanian junior championships after only one year of rowing training. Because of this success, she was invited to attend a sports boarding school in Kaunas.

Studying in Lithuanian Academy of Physical Education. She lives in Kaunas.
