= Sofia Asoumanaki =

Greek rower (born 1997)

Personal information
- Born: 25 May 1997 (age 29) Rethymno, Greece
- Height: 190 cm (6 ft 3 in)
- Weight: 85 kg (187 lb)

Sport
- Country: Greece
- Sport: Rowing
Medal record
Women's rowing
Representing Greece
World Championships
Silver medal – second place	2015 Aiguebelette-le-Lac	W2x
World Junior Championships
Silver medal – second place	2015 Rio de Janeiro	JW1x

Sofia Asoumanaki (Greek: Σοφία Ασουμανάκη; born 25 May 1997) is a Greek rower. She was born in Athens, Greece, and was involved in swimming between the ages of 2.5 until 16. During that time, she competed many times on the national level. At the age of 16, she decided to engage herself in rowing. Within her first year in the sport, she achieved fourth place at the World Rowing Junior Championships, but also received distinctions and medals in National, Balkan, European, and World Championships. In September 2015, she qualified for the 2016 Summer Olympics in Rio de Janeiro, where she represented Greece, along with Katerina Nikolaidou, in the double sculls, finishing in fourth place. She also won a silver medal in the double sculls at the 2015 World Rowing Championships and in the single sculls at the 2015 World Rowing Junior Championships. Asoumanaki holds the World Indoor Rowing record for 2,000 m in the female heavyweight 17–18 age category. After the 2016 Summer Olympics, she studied at the University of Washington.
