= Roos de Jong =

Dutch rower (born 1993)

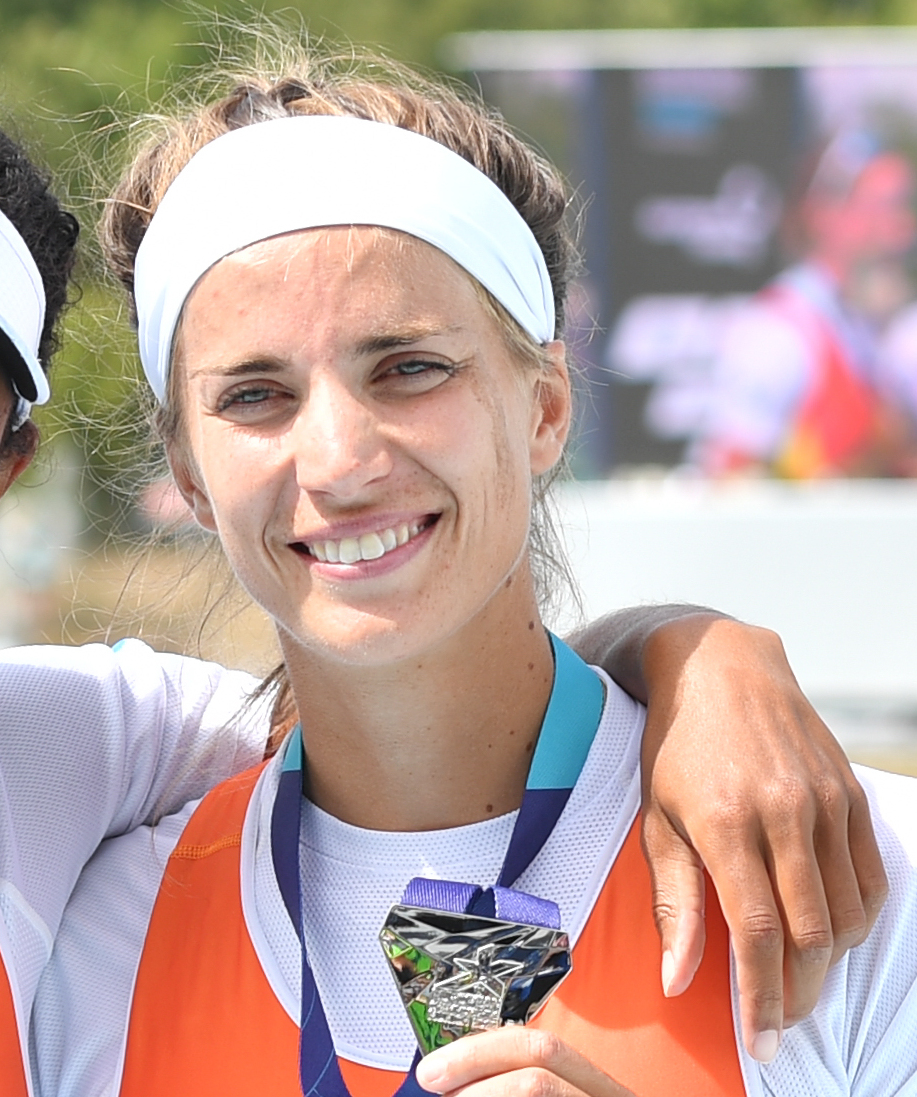
- De Jong in 2022

Personal information
- Nationality: Dutch
- Born: 23 August 1993 (age 33) Haarlem, Netherlands
- Height: 1.76 m (5 ft 9 in)

Sport
- Country: Netherlands
- Sport: Rowing
- Event: Double sculls
- Club: DSR Proteus-Eretes
Medal record
Women's rowing
Representing the Netherlands
Olympic Games
Silver medal – second place	2024 Paris	Quadruple sculls
Bronze medal – third place	2020 Tokyo	Double sculls
World Championships
Gold medal – first place	2025 Shanghai	Double sculls
Gold medal – first place	2026 Amsterdam	Mixed double sculls
Silver medal – second place	2022 Račice	Double sculls
Silver medal – second place	2022 Račice	Eight
Silver medal – second place	2023 Belgrade	Quadruple sculls
Silver medal – second place	2025 Shanghai	Mixed double sculls
Silver medal – second place	2026 Amsterdam	Double sculls
Bronze medal – third place	2019 Ottensheim	Double sculls
European Championships
Gold medal – first place	2025 Plovdiv	Double sculls
Silver medal – second place	2018 Glasgow	Double sculls
Silver medal – second place	2019 Lucerne	Quadruple sculls
Silver medal – second place	2020 Poznań	Double sculls
Silver medal – second place	2022 Munich	Double sculls
Bronze medal – third place	2022 Munich	Eight
Bronze medal – third place	2023 Bled	Double sculls

Roos de Jong (born 23 August 1993) is a Dutch rower. She won the bronze medal at the 2020 Summer Olympics in the double sculls event together with Lisa Scheenaard, whom she has rowed with since 2017. She has also won a medal at the 2019 World Rowing Championships.

In addition to rowing, De Jong also has a passion for design. She, along with Bjorn van den Ende, designed the rowing unisuit worn by the Dutch national team at the 2020 Tokyo Olympic Games. She went into isolation, after a coach and teammate tested positive for COVID-19.
