= Amanda Bateman =

Australian rower (born 1996)

Personal information
- Born: 3 July 1996 (age 30) Greensborough, Victoria, Australia
- Education: Firbank Girl's Grammar
- Years active: 2013-current
- Height: 185 cm (6 ft 1 in)

Sport
- Sport: Rowing
- Club: Melbourne University Boat Club
- Coached by: Ellen Randell

Achievements and titles
- National finals: Queen's Cup 2018 & 2021; Aust Champion W1X 2021; Aust Champion W2X 2021

Amanda Bateman (born 3 July 1996) is an Australian representative rower. She is a national champion, has represented at underage and senior world championships and is a 2021 Tokyo Olympian where she competed in the Australian women's double-scull.

== Club and state rowing ==
Born in Melbourne, Bateman was educated at Firbank Girls' Grammar School. Her senior club rowing has been from the Mercantile Rowing Club in Melbourne. She is the younger sister of Katrina Bateman who is also an elite rower who has competed for Mercantile, her state of Victoria and Australia.

Amanda's state representative debut for Victoria came in 2016 in the women's youth eight which contested and placed second in the Bicentennial Cup at the Interstate Regatta. In 2018 she rowed in the four seat of the Victorian women's eight which won the Queen's Cup at the Interstate Regatta. In 2021 and 2023 she raced to further Queen's Cup victories in the Victorian women's eight.

Bateman raced in Mercantile colours contesting the women's eight event at the 2017 Australian Rowing Championships. In 2018 and 2019 she raced in Mercantile quad sculls for the women's quad scull title. In 2021 she won Australian Championship titles in the women's single scull and in a double scull with Tara Rigney. In that same regatta in a quad scull she finished in second place contesting the 2021 women's quad title. At the 2023 Australian Rowing Championships she won the quad scull national title in a composite crew.

== International representative rowing ==
Bateman made her Australian representative debut at the 2013 Junior World Rowing Championships in Trakai Lithuania where she rowed in the Australian quad scull to a seventh placing. In 2014 she again raced at the Junior World Rowing Championships in Hamburg where she rowed the single scull to a sixteenth placing.

In 2017 she was picked for the World Rowing U23 Championships in Plovdiv where she rowed in the three seat of the coxless four to an eighth placing.

In 2019 Bateman moved into Australia's senior women's squad for the international season. Rowing with Genevieve Horton she rowed the Australian women's double scull to a bronze medal at the World Rowing Cup II in Poznan and to a silver medal at WRC III in Rotterdam. Bateman and Horton were selected to race Australia's double scull at the 2019 World Rowing Championships in Linz, Austria. The double were looking for a top eleven finish at the 2019 World Championships to qualify for the Tokyo Olympics. They won their heat and placed fourth in their semi-final. They finished fifth in the B-final for an overall eleventh world place and qualified the boat for Tokyo 2020.

By the time of national team selections in 2021 for the delayed Tokyo Olympics, Bateman's strong performances in all three sculling boats at the 2021 Australian Championships saw her hold her seat in the double she'd qualified two years earlier. She was partnered with Tara Rigney a national U23 representative of 2019, who dominated the NSW state championships in 2021. Bateman and Rigney placed third in their heat, fifth in the semi-final and won the petite final for an overall seventh place finish at the Olympic regatta. They were coached by Ellen Randall.

Bateman was selected in the Australian sculling squad for the 2022 international season and the 2022 World Rowing Championships. At the 2022 World Rowing Championships at Racize, she rowed in the Australian quad scull to an overall sixth place finish.

In March 2023 Bateman was again selected in the Australian women's sculling squad for the 2023 international season. At the Rowing World Cup II in Varese Italy, Bateman raced as Australia's W2X entrant with Laura Gourley. They made the A final and finished in fourth place. At 2023's WRC III in Lucerne, Gourley and Bateman again raced the W2X. They made the A final and in a tight finish at the back of that field they again finished in fourth place. Bateman and Gourley were selected to race Australia's double scull at 2023 World Rowing Championships in Belgrade, Serbia. They placed third in their heat but then won their repechage to qualify through to the A/B semi in which they finished fifth. In the B final they finished 2nd, earnt an 8th place world ranking from the regatta and qualified the boat for Paris 2024.
