= Andrea Proske =

Canadian rower (born 1986)

Personal information
- Born: June 27, 1986 (age 40) Vancouver, British Columbia, Canada
- Height: 185 cm (6 ft 1 in)
- Weight: 79 kg (174 lb)
Medal record
Women's Rowing
Representing Canada
Olympic Games
Gold medal – first place	2020 Tokyo	Eight

Andrea Proske (born June 27, 1986) is a Canadian rower.

== Career ==
In 2018 and 2019, Proske competed with Gabrielle Smith in the double sculls boat at the World Rowing Championships. In 2018, they finished in sixth and in 2019 fourth, and qualifying Canada the boat for the 2020 Summer Olympics.

In June 2021, Proske was named to Canada's 2020 Olympic team in the women's eights boat. At the Olympics, the boat won the gold medal, Canada's first in the event since 1992.

Proske is the Vice President and President Elect of AthletesCAN, a non-profit organization which advocates for athlete-centered sporting policies, gender equity, parental rights, and abuse-free sport.

Proske has maintained her ties to competitive sport as an international sports commentator for key events on the rowing and canoe sprint calendar, including the 2024 Summer Olympics, World Rowing Championships, RCA National Rowing Championships, Henley Royal Regatta, Head of the Charles Regatta, and ICF Canoe Sprint World Championships.
