= Lenka Lukšová =

Czech rower (born 1991)

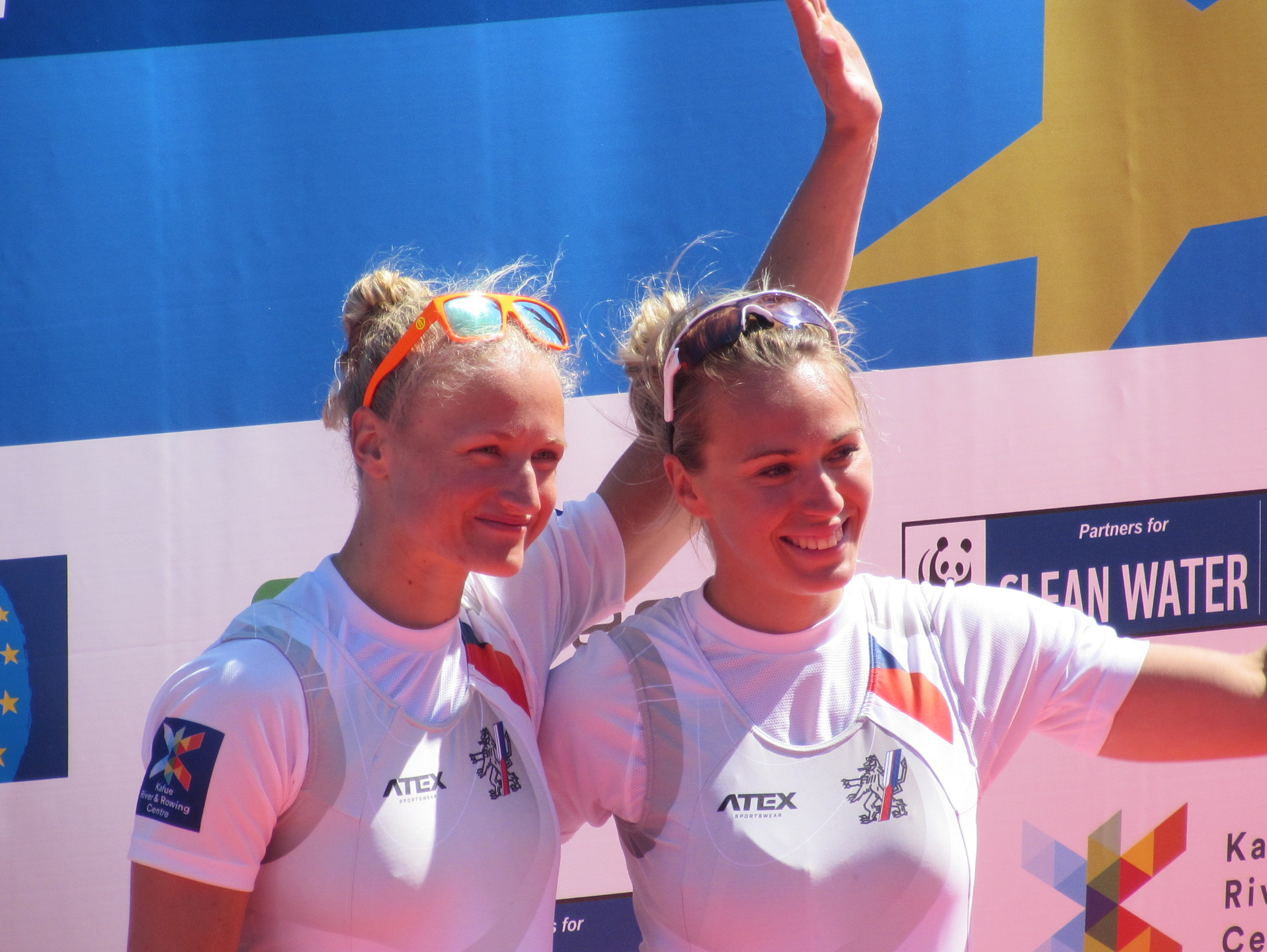
- Lukšová (left) with Kristýna Fleissnerová

Personal information
- Born: Lenka Antošová; 27 September 1991 (age 34) Děčín, Czechoslovakia
- Relatives: Jitka Antošová (sister)

Sport
- Sport: Rowing
Medal record
Women's rowing
Representing the Czech Republic
European Rowing Championships
Gold medal – first place	2017 Račice	Double scull
Silver medal – second place	2009 Brest	Double scull
Bronze medal – third place	2011 Plovdiv	Double scull
Bronze medal – third place	2016 Brandenburg	Double scull

Lenka Lukšová (née Lenka Antošová; born 27 September 1991) is a Czech rower. She competed at four Olympic Games (2012, 2016, 2020, 2024) in the double sculls, once with her sister Jitka as rowing partner, twice with Kristýna Fleissnerová and once with Anna Šantrůčková. With Fleissnerová, she was the 2017 European Rowing Champion in double scull.

== Biography ==
Lenka Antošová was born on 27 September 1991 in Děčín. Her sister and former rowing partner is Jitka Antošová.

At the Junior World Championships, Antošová won two silver medals together with Denisa Čvančarová. After that, she teamed with her sister. The Antošová sisters won the silver medal at the 2009 European Championships, and bronze at the 2011 European Championships. The team then competed at the 2012 Olympics, winning the B final.

In 2016, teaming with Kristýna Fleissnerová, Lenka Antošová won the bronze medal at the European Championships. The team won the European Olympic Qualification regatta, securing a place at the 2016 Olympics, where they again reached the B final.

In 2017, Antošová and Fleissnerová won the European Championships which were held in Račice in the Czech Republic. The team also competed at the 2020 Summer Olympics, reaching the B final.

In 2022, Antošová started competing in single sculls. In 2023, she married and took the name Lukšová.

In 2024, she teamed with Anna Šantrůčková. They narrowly missed out on the A final at the 2024 Olympics in Paris, eventually finishing 8th, after being runners-up in the B-final.
