= Gabrielle Smith =

Canadian rower (born 1994)

Personal information
- Born: October 24, 1994 (age 31) Toronto, Ontario, Canada
- Height: 180 cm (5 ft 11 in)
- Weight: 80 kg (176 lb)

Sport
- Country: Canada
- Sport: Rowing
- Event: Double Sculls
- University team: McGill University, University of Oxford
Medal record
Women's rowing
Representing Canada
World Championships
Bronze medal – third place	2022 Račice	Eight

Gabrielle Smith (born October 24, 1994) is a Canadian rower from Unionville, Ontario.

== Career ==
At the 2019 World Rowing Championships, Smith along with partner Andrea Proske finished fourth in the women's double sculls, qualifying the boat for the 2020 Olympics.

Smith took part in the 2021 edition of The Boat Race as a member of the Oxford crew. She completed a MSc in Water Science, Policy and Management at Oxford, having previously studied at McGill University.

In June 2021, Smith was named to Canada's 2020 Olympic team in the women's double sculls with partner Jessica Sevick. Andrea Proske, her partner from 2019, was instead named to the eights boat.
