= Élodie Ravera-Scaramozzino =

French rower (born 1995)

Élodie Ravera
- Ravera with Hélène Lefebvre in 2015

Personal information
- Full name: Élodie Ravera-Scaramozzino
- Born: 19 September 1995 (age 31) Nice, France
- Height: 1.70 m (5 ft 7 in)
- Weight: 71 kg (157 lb)

Sport
- Country: France
- Sport: Rowing
- Club: Club Nautique de Nice
Medal record
European Championships
Bronze medal – third place	2020 Poznań	Double sculls

Élodie Ravera-Scaramozzino (born 19 September 1995) is a French rower. She competed in the women's double sculls event at the 2016 Summer Olympics. Ravera-Scaramozzino rowed collegiately for the Ohio State Buckeyes.
