= Ieva Adomavičiūtė =

Lithuanian rower (born 1994)

Personal information
- Born: 3 December 1994 (age 31) Kaunas, Lithuania

Sport
- Country: Lithuania
- Sport: Rowing
- College team: Washington State Cougars (2012–2016)
Medal record
Representing Lithuania
Women's Rowing
World Championships
Gold medal – first place	2018 Plovdiv	W2x
European Championships
Bronze medal – third place	2018 Glasgow	W2x
World Under 23 Championships
Gold medal – first place	2015 Plovdiv	W1x
Gold medal – first place	2016 Rotterdam	W1x
World Junior Championships
Gold medal – first place	World Juniors 2011	W2x
Gold medal – first place	World Juniors 2012	W2x
European Junior Championships
Gold medal – first place	2011	W2x

Ieva Adomavičiūtė (born 3 December 1994) is a Lithuanian national representative rower. She won the women's double scull title alongside Milda Valčiukaitė at the 2018 World Rowing Championships in Plovdiv. She was four-times an underage world champion (twice junior, twice under 23). She studied at Washington State University.
