= Kristýna Fleissnerová =

Czech rower (born 1992)

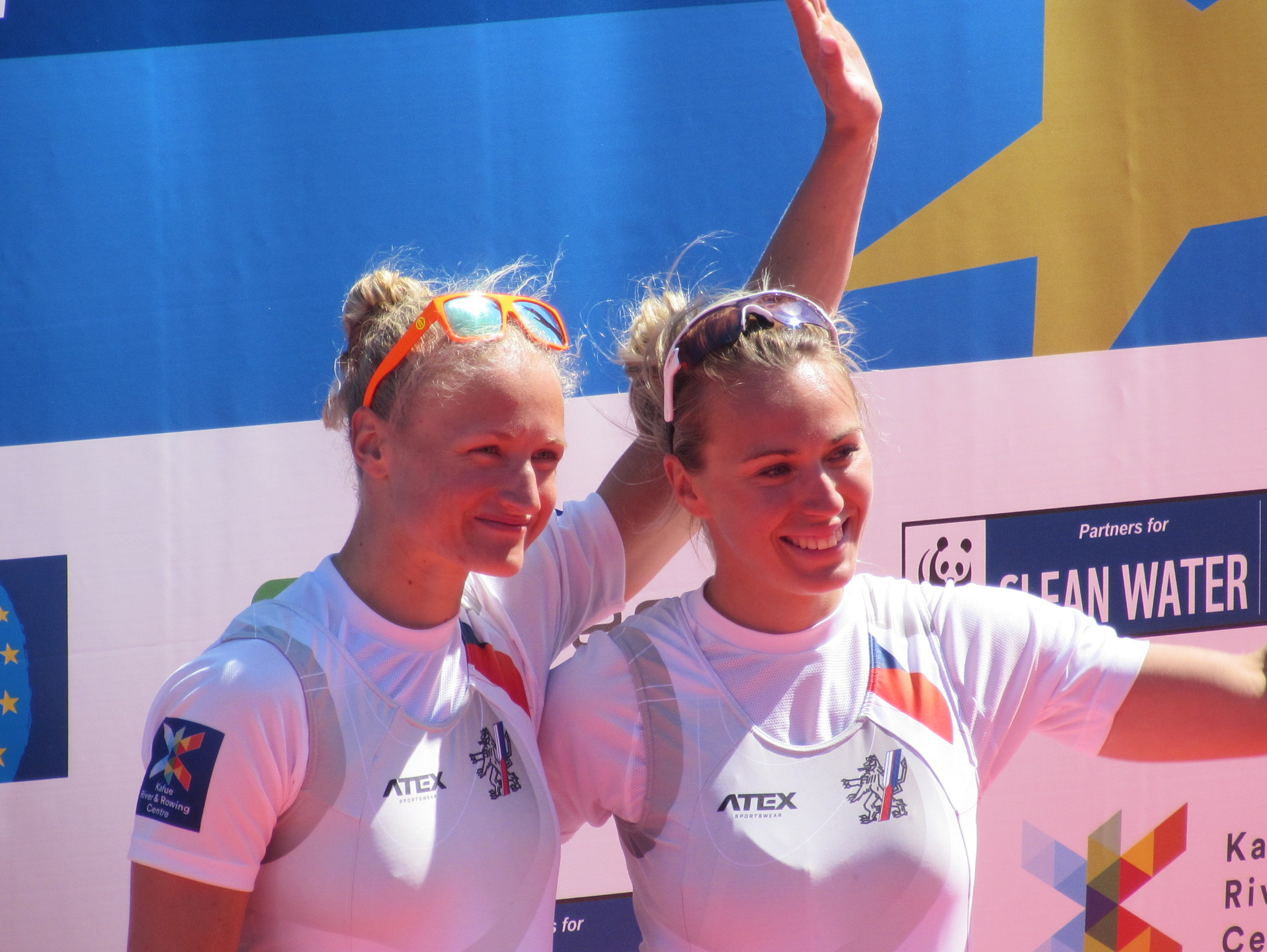

Personal information
- Born: 18 August 1992 (age 33)

Sport
- Sport: Rowing

Kristýna Fleissnerová (born 18 August 1992) is a Czech rower. She competed in the women's double sculls event at the 2016 Summer Olympics.
