= Hélène Lefebvre =

French rower

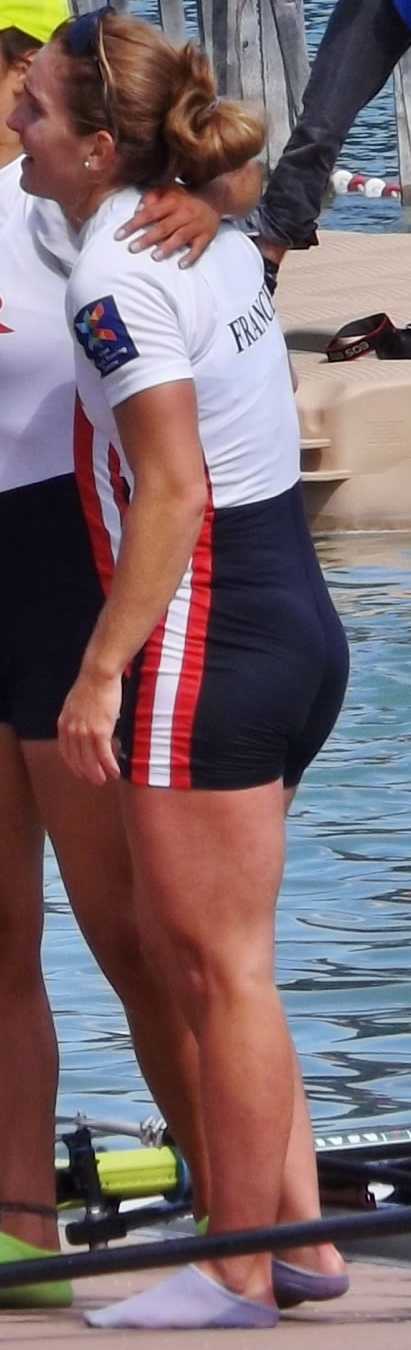

Personal information
- Nationality: French
- Born: 26 February 1991 (age 35)

Sport
- Sport: Rowing
Medal record
European Championships
Bronze medal – third place	2020 Poznan	Double sculls

Hélène Lefebvre (born 26 February 1991) is a French rower. She competed in the women's double sculls event at the 2016 Summer Olympics and finished 5th.
