= Milda Valčiukaitė =

Lithuanian rower (born 1994)

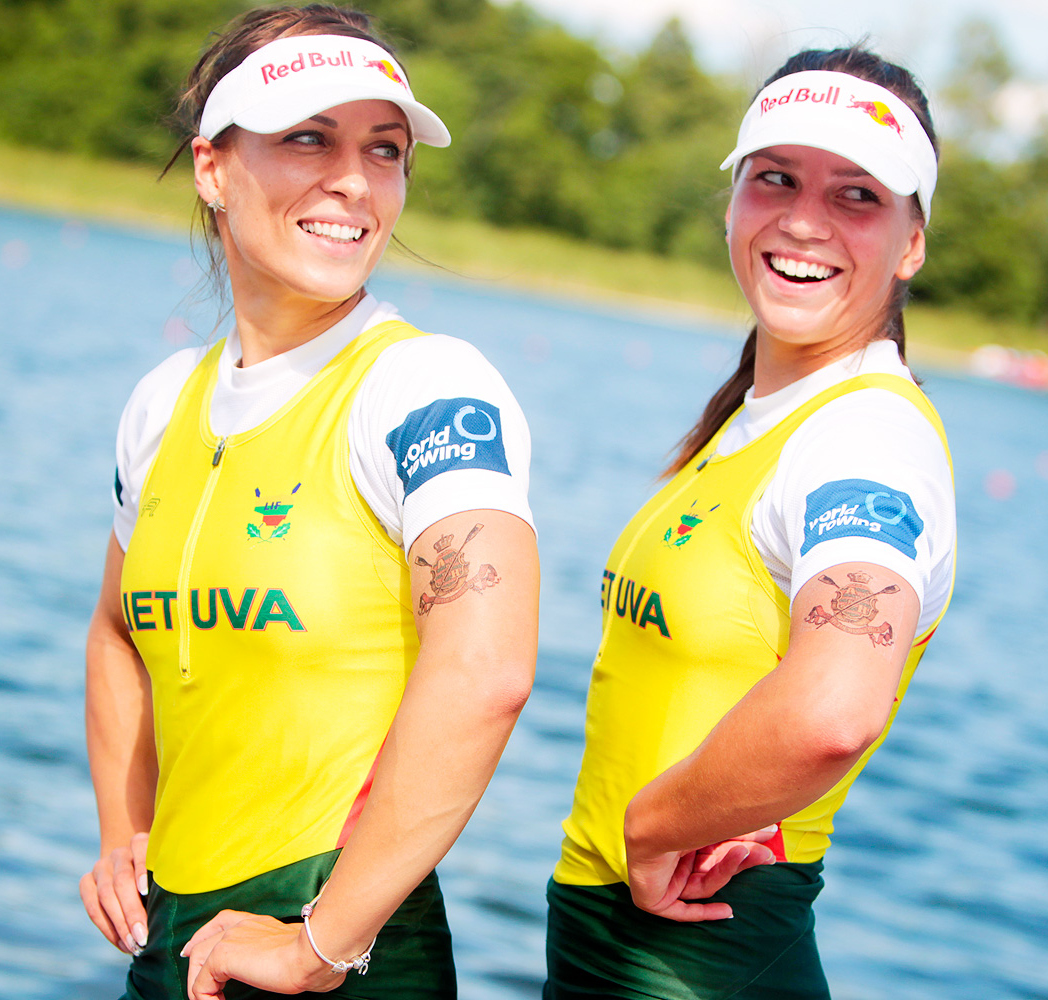
- Valčiukaitė (right) and Donata Karalienė

Personal information
- Born: 24 May 1994 (age 32) Vilnius, Lithuania
Medal record
Women's rowing
Representing Lithuania
Olympic Games
Bronze medal – third place	2016 Rio de Janeiro	Double sculls
World Championships
Gold medal – first place	2013 Chungju	Double sculls
Gold medal – first place	2018 Plovdiv	Double sculls
World Junior Championships
Gold medal – first place	2011 Dorney	Double sculls
Gold medal – first place	2012 Plovdiv	Double sculls
European Championships
Gold medal – first place	2013 Sevilla	Double sculls
Silver medal – second place	2014 Belgrade	Double sculls
Silver medal – second place	2021 Varese	Double sculls
Bronze medal – third place	2018 Glasgow	Double sculls
European Junior Championships
Gold medal – first place	2011 Kruszwica	Double sculls
Summer Universiade
Gold medal – first place	2015 Gwangju	Double sculls

Milda Valčiukaitė (born 24 May 1994) is a Lithuanian national representative rower, an Olympian and dual world champion. She won the women's double scull title alongside Ieva Adomavičiūtė at the 2018 World Rowing Championships in Plovdiv. She won gold medals at the 2013 World Rowing Championships and the 2013 European Rowing Championships and was a bronze medallist at the 2016 Summer Olympics.

Valčiukaitė is coached by Tomas Valčiukas, and has won two world junior championships with Ieva Adomavičiūtė. In 2013, Valčiukaitė started to compete with Donata Karalienė. She currently studies Business Information management at Vilnius University.

== Personal life ==
Valčiukaitė is engaged to another Lithuanian rower Saulius Ritter.
