= 2023 World Rowing Championships – Women's double sculls =

2023 Women's World Rowing Championships

Women's double sculls at the 2023 World Rowing Championships
- Venue: Lake Sava
- Location: Belgrade, Serbia
- Dates: 4 September – 10 September
- Competitors: 38 from 19 nations
- Winning time: 6:46.94

Medalists
gold medal	Ancuța Bodnar; Simona Radiș	Romania
silver medal	Donata Karalienė; Dovile Rimkutė	Lithuania
bronze medal	Kristina Wagner; Sophia Vitas	United States

The women's double sculls competition at the 2023 World Rowing Championships took place at Lake Sava, in Belgrade.

== Schedule ==
The schedule was as follows:

Date	Time	Round
Monday 4 September 2023	10:22	Heats
Wednesday 6 September 2023	11:12	Repechages
Thursday 7 September 2023	17:05	Semifinals C/D
Friday 8 September 2023	10:55	Semifinals A/B
Sunday 10 September 2023	10:01	Final D
Sunday 10 September 2023	10:39	Final C
Sunday 10 September 2023	11:37	Final B
Sunday 10 September 2023	13:54	Final A

All times are Central European Summer Time (UTC+2)

== Results ==
=== Heats ===
The two fastest boats in each heat advanced directly to the semifinals A/B. The remaining boats were sent to the repechages.

==== Heat 1 ====
Rank	Rower	Country	Time	Notes
1	Zoe Hyde; Alison Bergin	Ireland	6:59.39	SA/B
2	Donata Karalienė; Dovile Rimkutė	Lithuania	7:02.26	SA/B
3	Thea Helseth; Jenny Marie Rorvik	Norway	7:07.90	R
4	Saskia Budgett; Kyra Edwards	Great Britain	6:15.68	R
5	Salome Ulrich; Sofia Meakin	Switzerland	7:14.49	R

==== Heat 2 ====
Rank	Rower	Country	Time	Notes
1	Kristina Wagner; Sophia Vitas	United States	6:58.91	SA/B
2	Stefania Buttignon; Silvia Crosio	Italy	7:00.56	SA/B
3	Amanda Bateman; Laura Gourley	Australia	7:02.48	R
4	Marilou Duvernay-Tardif; Katie Clark	Canada	7:03.56	R
5	Paige Badenhorst; Katherine Williams	South Africa	7:08.33	R

==== Heat 3 ====
Rank	Rower	Country	Time	Notes
1	Brooke Francis; Lucy Spoors	New Zealand	7:03.74	SA/B
2	Lu Shiyu; Shen Shuangmei	China	7:06.07	SA/B
3	Nika Johanna Vos; Lisa Scheenaard	Netherlands	7:07.98	R
4	Wiktoria Kalinowska; Jessika Sobocinska	Poland	7:14.21	R
5	Michala Pospíšilová; Kristýna Neuhortová	Czech Republic	7:19.04	R

==== Heat 4 ====
Rank	Rower	Country	Time	Notes
1	Ancuța Bodnar; Simona Radiș	Romania	6:55.41	SA/B
2	Margaux Bailleul; Emma Lunatti	France	7:02.74	SA/B
3	Leonie Menzel; Maren Völz	Germany	7:14.60	R
4	Sofia Dalidou; Evangelia Fragkou	Greece	7:21.49	R

=== Repechages ===
The two fastest boats in each heat advanced directly to the semifinals A/B. The remaining boats were sent to the semifinals C/D.

==== Repechage 1 ====
Rank	Rower	Country	Time	Notes
1	Amanda Bateman; Laura Gourley	Australia	7:02.27	SA/B
2	Thea Helseth; Jenny Marie Rorvik	Norway	7:03.74	SA/B
3	Wiktoria Kalinowska; Jessika Sobocinska	Poland	7:09.01	SC/D
4	Salome Ulrich; Sofia Meakin	Switzerland	7:09.41	SC/D
5	Michala Pospíšilová; Kristýna Neuhortová	Czech Republic	7:15.64	SC/D
6	Sofia Dalidou; Evangelia Fragkou	Greece	7:16.92	SC/D

==== Repechage 2 ====
Rank	Rower	Country	Time	Notes
1	Nika Johanna Vos; Lisa Scheenaard	Netherlands	7:00.76	SA/B
2	Paige Badenhorst; Katherine Williams	South Africa	7:01.25	SA/B
3	Leonie Menzel; Maren Völz	Germany	7:01.87	SC/D
4	Marilou Duvernay-Tardif; Katie Clark	Canada	7:09.00	SC/D
5	Saskia Budgett; Kyra Edwards	Great Britain	7:10.70	SC/D

=== Semifinals C/D ===
The two fastest boats in semifinal 1 and three fastest boats in semifinal 2 advanced to the C final. The remaining boats were sent to the D final.

==== Semifinal 1 ====
Rank	Rower	Country	Time	Notes
1	Marilou Duvernay-Tardif; Katie Clark	Canada	7:32.04	FC
2	Wiktoria Kalinowska; Jessika Sobocinska	Poland	7:37.02	FC
3	Michala Pospíšilová; Kristýna Neuhortová	Czech Republic	7:47.60	FD

==== Semifinal 2 ====
Rank	Rower	Country	Time	Notes
1	Saskia Budgett; Kyra Edwards	Great Britain	7:20.77	FC
2	Leonie Menzel; Maren Völz	Germany	7:21.15	FC
3	Salome Ulrich; Sofia Meakin	Switzerland	7:26.48	FC
4	Sofia Dalidou; Evangelia Fragkou	Greece	7:30.94	FD

=== Semifinals A/B ===
The three fastest boats in each semi advanced to the A final. The remaining boats were sent to the B final.

==== Semifinal 1 ====
Rank	Rower	Country	Time	Notes
1	Kristina Wagner; Sophia Vitas	United States	7:01.76	FA
2	Zoe Hyde; Alison Bergin	Ireland	7:02.22	FA
3	Margaux Bailleul; Emma Lunatti	France	7:06.03	FA
4	Lu Shiyu; Shen Shuangmei	China	7:08.14	FB
5	Amanda Bateman; Laura Gourley	Australia	7:12.88	FB
6	Paige Badenhorst; Katherine Williams	South Africa	7:16.62	FB

==== Semifinal 2 ====
Rank	Rower	Country	Time	Notes
1	Ancuța Bodnar; Simona Radiș	Romania	7:04.97	FA
2	Donata Karalienė; Dovile Rimkutė	Lithuania	7:09.09	FA
3	Brooke Francis; Lucy Spoors	New Zealand	7:12.62	FA
4	Nika Johanna Vos; Lisa Scheenaard	Netherlands	7:16.17	FB
5	Thea Helseth; Jenny Marie Rorvik	Norway	7:21.55	FB
6	Stefania Buttignon; Silvia Crosio	Italy	7:22.93	FB

=== Finals ===
The A final determined the rankings for places 1 to 6. Additional rankings were determined in the other finals.

==== Final D ====
Rank	Rower	Country	Time	Total rank
1	Michala Pospíšilová; Markéta Nedělová	Czech Republic	7:11.27	18
	Sofia Dalidou; Evangelia Fragkou	Greece	DNS	

==== Final C ====
Rank	Rower	Country	Time	Total rank
1	Saskia Budgett; Kyra Edwards	Great Britain	6:59.20	13
2	Leonie Menzel; Maren Völz	Germany	7:00.70	14
3	Marilou Duvernay-Tardif; Katie Clark	Canada	7:00.78	15
4	Salome Ulrich; Sofia Meakin	Switzerland	7:04.24	16
5	Wiktoria Kalinowska; Jessika Sobocinska	Poland	7:04.54	17

==== Final B ====
Rank	Rower	Country	Time	Total rank
1	Stefania Buttignon; Silvia Crosio	Italy	6:53.71	7
2	Amanda Bateman; Laura Gourley	Australia	6:53.76	8
3	Thea Helseth; Jenny Marie Rorvik	Norway	6:53.78	9
4	Lu Shiyu; Shen Shuangmei	China	6:55.11	10
5	Nika Johanna Vos; Lisa Scheenaard	Netherlands	6:55.72	11
6	Paige Badenhorst; Katherine Williams	South Africa	6:56.30	12

==== Final A ====
Rank	Rower	Country	Time
1st place, gold medalist(s)	Ancuța Bodnar; Simona Radiș	Romania	6:46.94
2nd place, silver medalist(s)	Donata Karalienė; Dovile Rimkutė	Lithuania	6:50.34
3rd place, bronze medalist(s)	Kristina Wagner; Sophia Vitas	United States	6:50.45
4	Zoe Hyde; Alison Bergin	Ireland	6:52.21
5	Brooke Francis; Lucy Spoors	New Zealand	6:54.99
6	Margaux Bailleul; Emma Lunatti	France	7:06.45
