= 1966 NSWRFL season =

Rugby league competition

1966 New South Wales Rugby Football League
- Teams: 10
- Premiers: St. George (13th title)
- Minor premiers: St. George (12th title)
- Matches played: 95
- Points scored: 2715
- Total attendance: 1293261
- Top points scorer: Bob Lanigan (185)
- Wooden spoon: Eastern Suburbs (4th spoon)
- Top try-scorer: Johnny King (15)

The 1966 New South Wales Rugby Football League premiership was the 59th season of the rugby league competition based in Sydney. Ten clubs from across the city competed for the J.J. Giltinan Shield and the WD & HO Wills Cup during the season, which culminated in a replay of the 1964 grand final between St. George and Balmain.

== Season summary ==
1966 was the last season played under the unlimited tackle rule. Balmain, with their talented raw rookie recruit Arthur Beetson, appeared to be about to topple the Dragons from their long-held perch when the Tigers won eleven consecutive regular season games. However a late season slump saw them pegged back to the rest of the field and an eventual second place on the minor-premiership ladder behind the Dragons, who were being led by new captain-coach Ian Walsh.

Eastern Suburbs did not win a single match in 1966, continuing a losing streak that started in round 14, 1965 and which would run till round 2, 1967. This marked the second-most consecutive losses in NSWRFL premiership history at 25 behind University’s 42 in the middle 1930s. Their winless streak ran a total of 29 games between their 11–9 win over Canterbury in Round 12, 1965 and beating North Sydney 17–11 in Round 6 of 1967. This remains the last time any team would go through an Australian rugby league season winless.

No team would finish a season on zero points again until the Melbourne Storm finished last in the 2010 NRL season as punishment for gross salary cap breaches uncovered by the NRL in April that year.

=== Teams ===
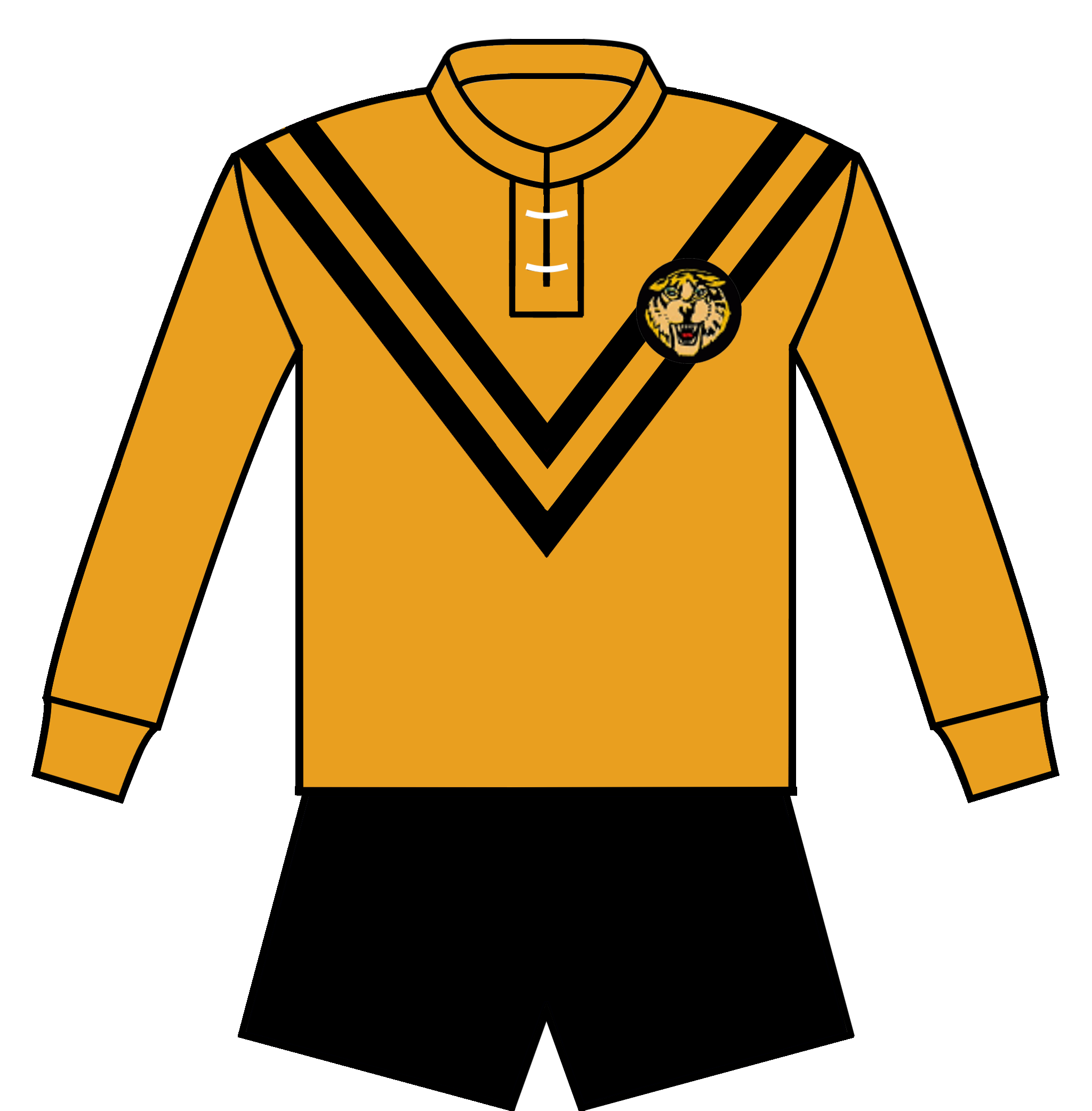
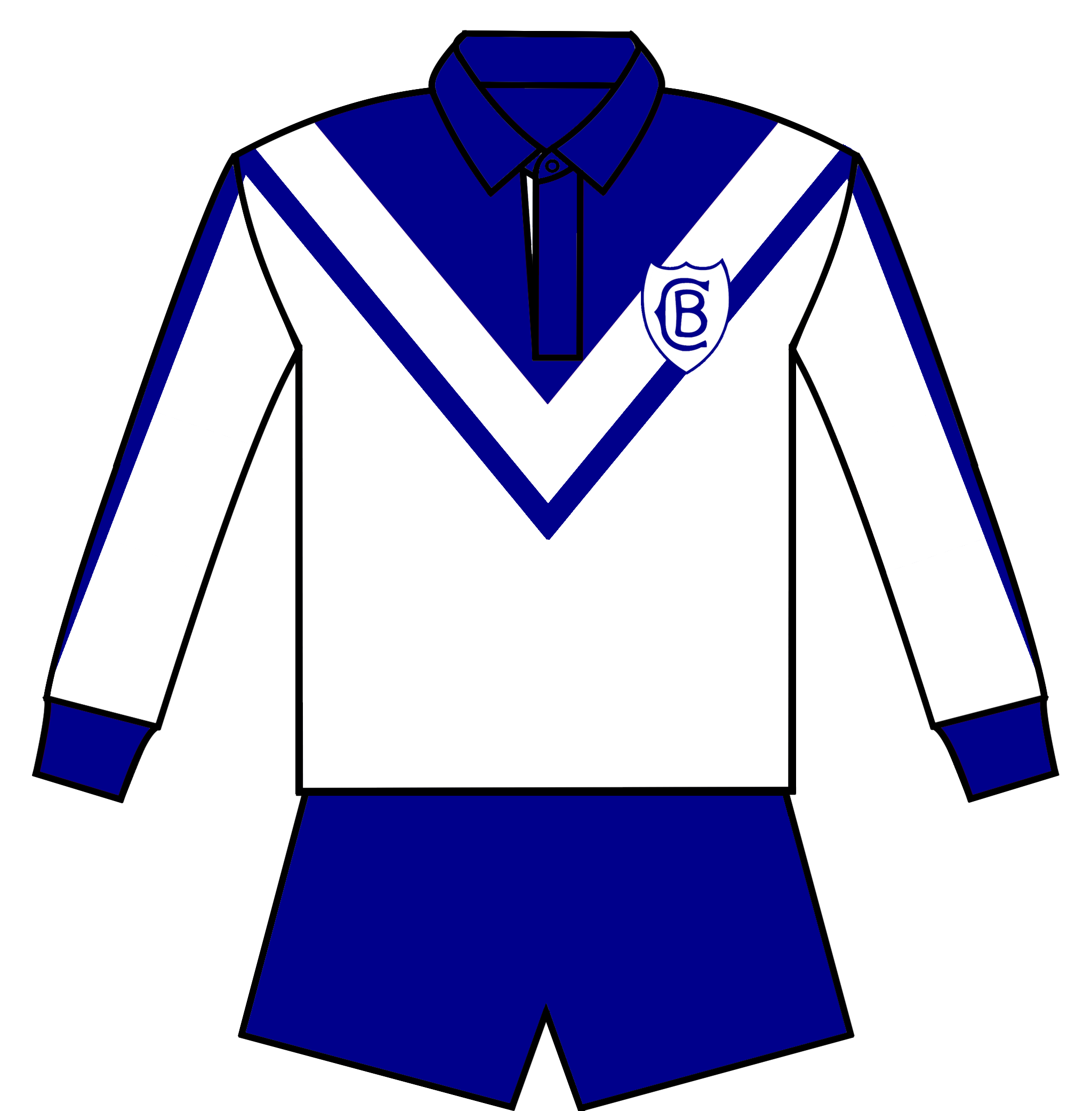
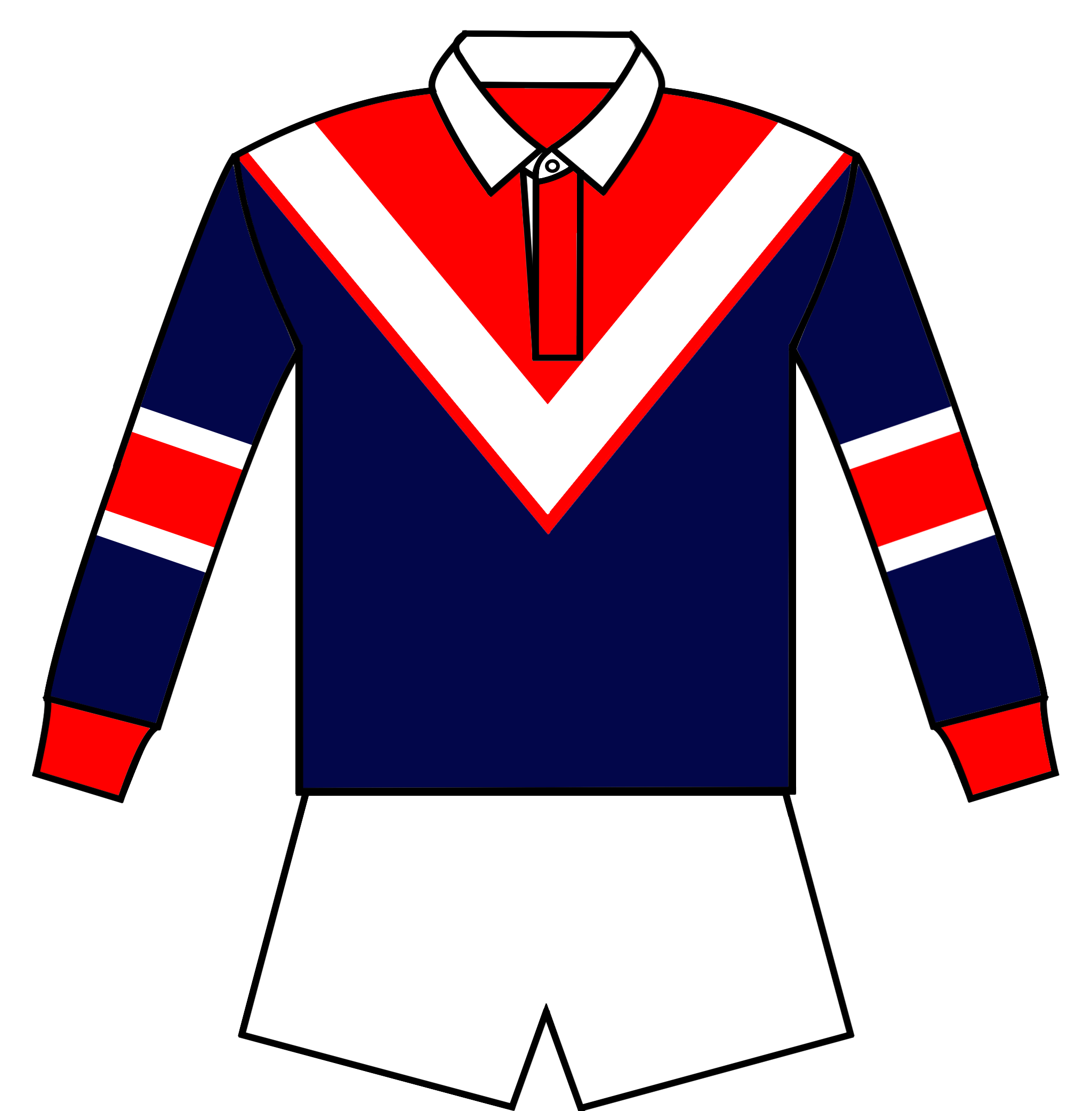
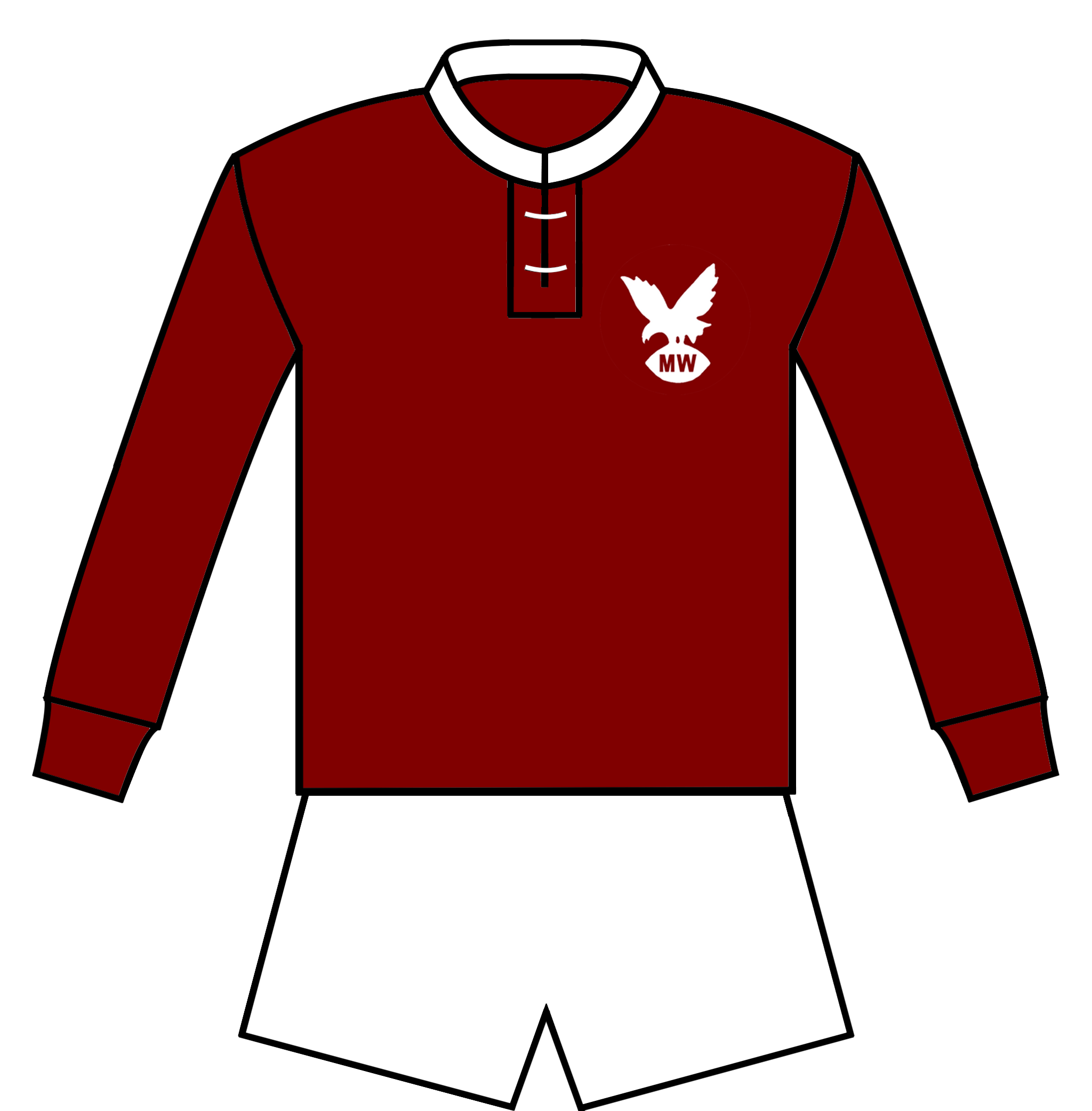
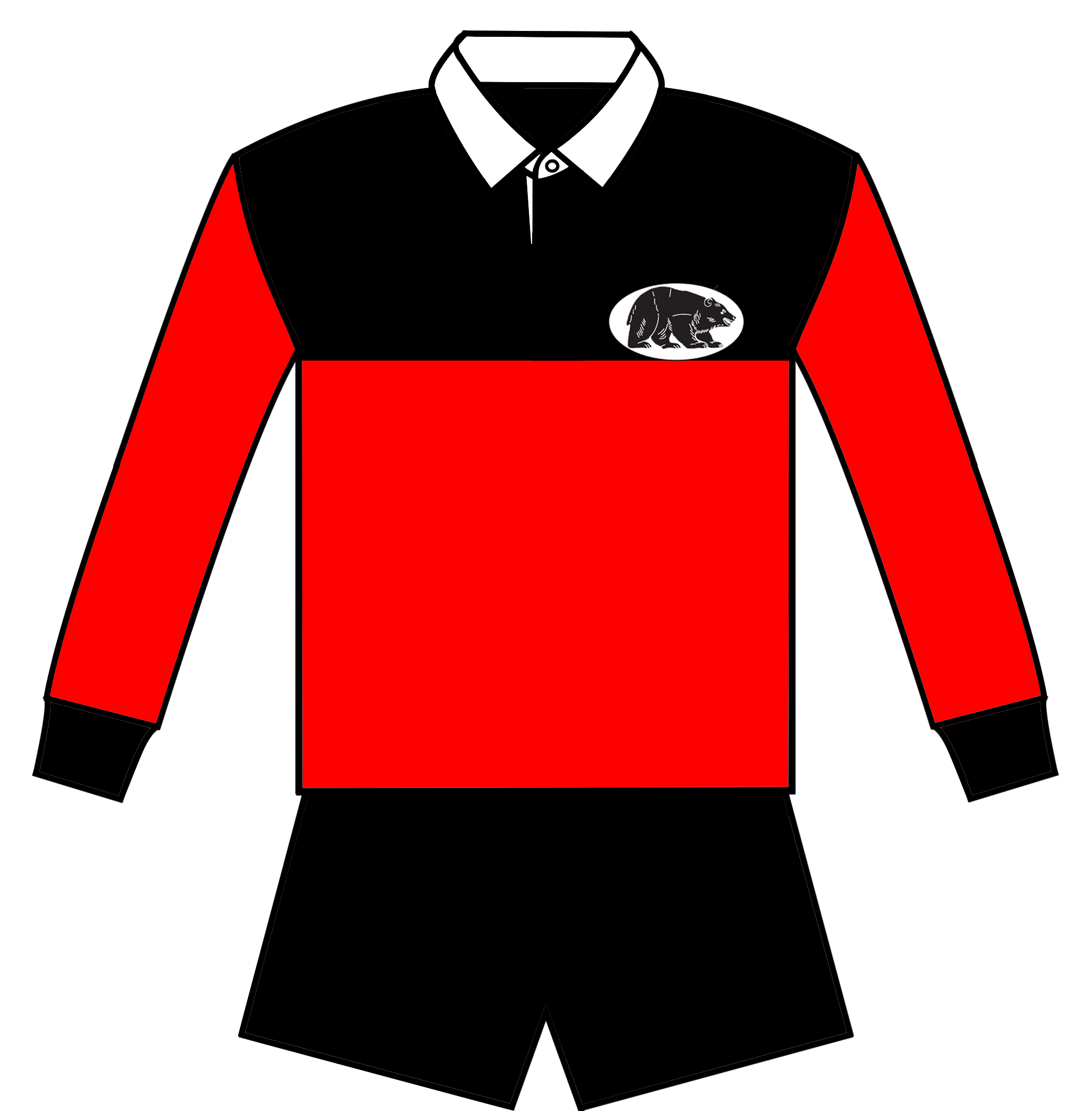
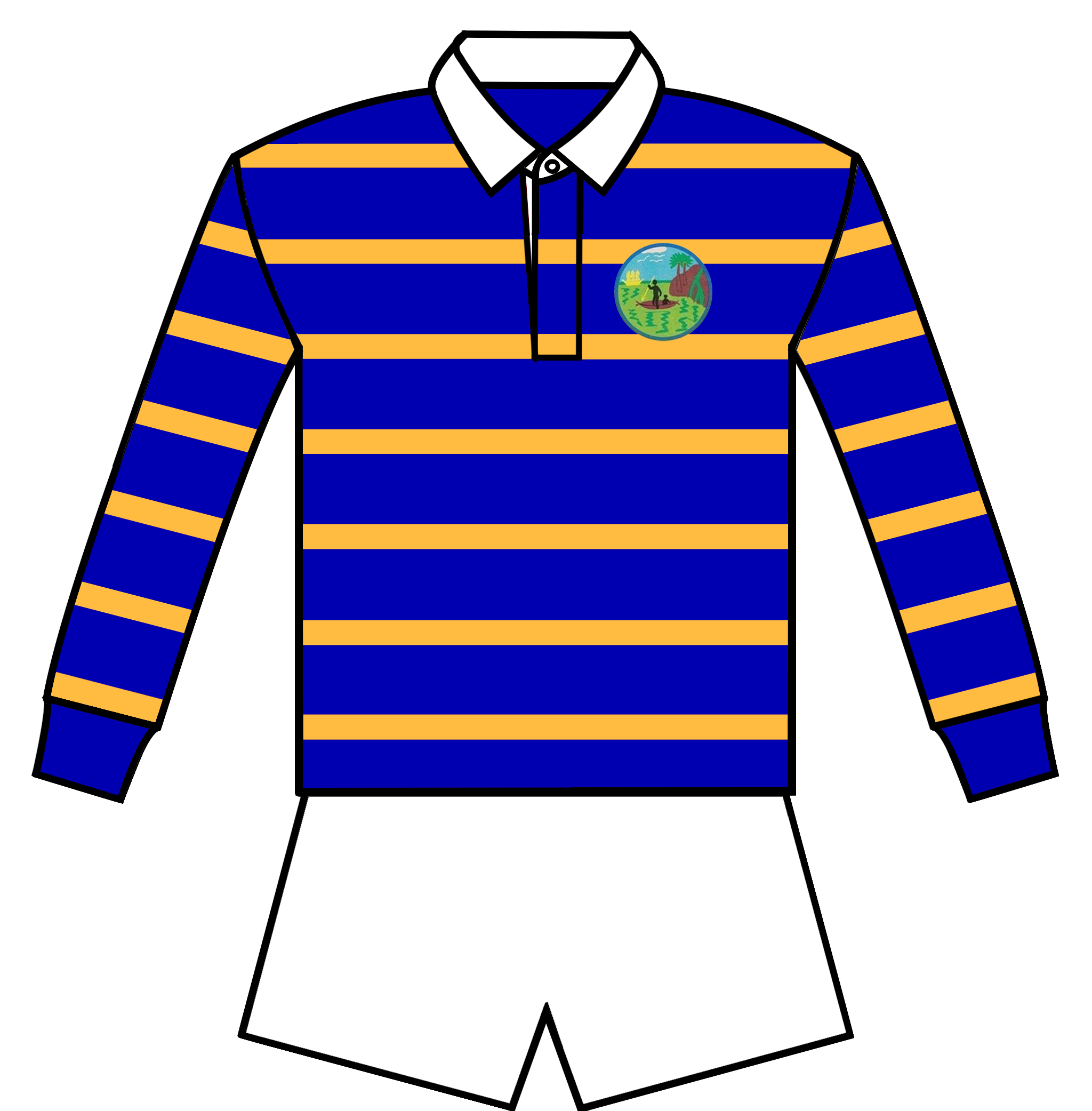
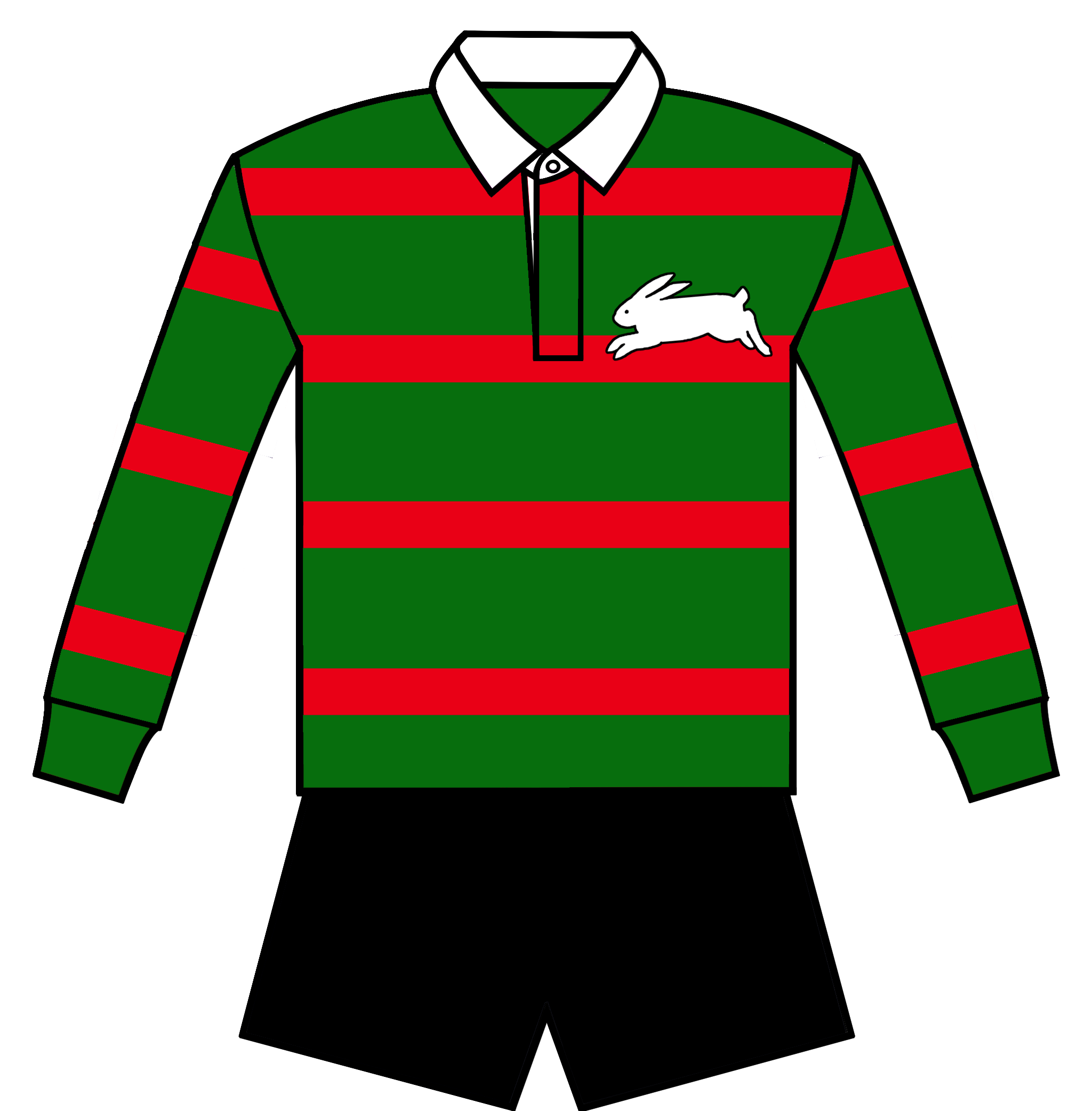
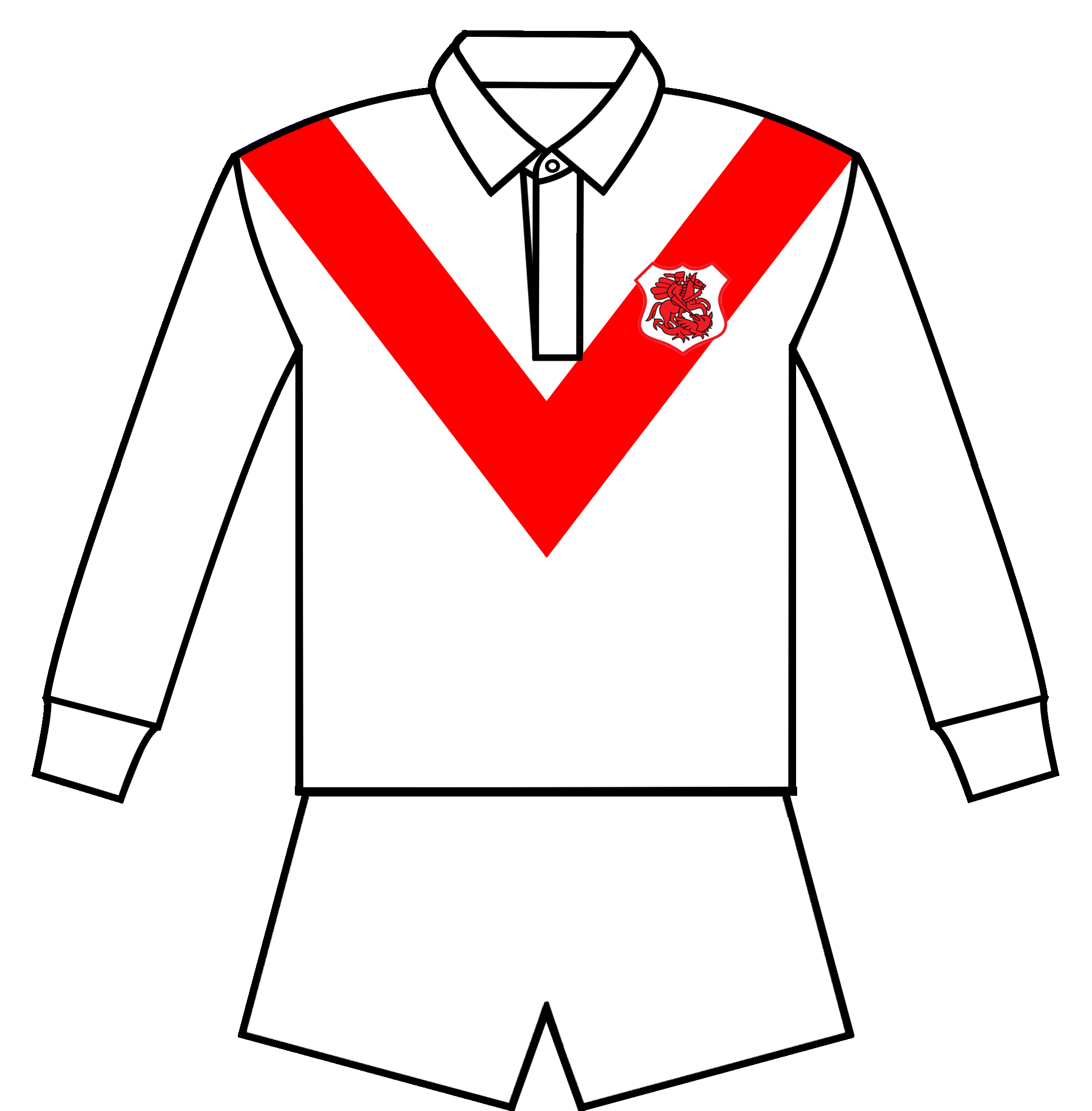
Balmain 59th season Ground: Leichhardt Oval; Coach: Harry Bath; Captain: Keith Barnes	Canterbury-Bankstown 32nd season Ground: Belmore Sports Ground; Captain-coach: Roger Pearman→George Taylforth	Eastern Suburbs 59th season Ground: Sydney Sports Ground; Coach: Bert Holcroft; Captains: Ron Saddler / Ken Ashcroft	Manly-Warringah 20th season Ground: Brookvale Oval; Coach: Wally O'Connell; Captains: Frank Stanton / Ken Day	Newtown 59th season Ground: Henson Park; Coach: Dick Poole; Captain: Paul Quinn
North Sydney 59th season Ground: North Sydney Oval; Coach: Fred Griffiths; Captain: Billy Wilson	Parramatta 20th season Ground: Cumberland Oval; Captain-coach: Ken Thornett	South Sydney 59th season Ground: Redfern Oval; Coach: Bernie Purcell; Captain(s): Jim Lisle / Bob Moses	St. George 46th season Ground: Jubilee Oval; Captain-coach: Ian Walsh	Western Suburbs 59th season Ground: Pratten Park; Captain-Coach: Noel Kelly

== Regular season ==
Team	1	2	3	4	5	6	7	8	9	10	11	12	13	14	15	16	17	18	19	F1	F2	F3	F4	GF
Balmain	**STG** **+3**	EAS +6	**CBY** **+4**	**MAN** **+5**	SOU +4	**PAR** **+9**	**NOR** **+20**	**NEW** **+3**	**WES** **+5**	**STG** **+7**	**EAS** **+23**	CBY −4	**MAN** **+13**	**SOU** **−8**	X	PAR −2	NOR −5	NEW −2	WES −5	X	X	STG −8	**MAN** **+3**	STG −19
Canterbury-Bankstown	**WES** **−10**	**NEW** **−7**	BAL −4	EAS +15	**STG** **−2**	MAN −23	**SOU** **+4**	NOR −9	**PAR** **+2**	**WES** **+3**	NEW +5	**BAL** **+4**	**EAS** **+2**	STG −2	X	**MAN** **−4**	SOU −19	**NOR** **+6**	PAR −12					
Eastern Suburbs	**NEW** **−7**	**BAL** **−6**	STG −26	**CBY** **−15**	MAN −17	**SOU** **−7**	PAR −12	WES −9	NOR −18	NEW −6	BAL −23	**STG** **−15**	CBY −2	**MAN** **−53**	**NOR** **−13**	SOU −30	**PAR** **−9**	**WES** **−31**	X					
Manly-Warringah	**NOR** **+10**	WES −7	NEW −8	BAL −5	**EAS** **+17**	**CBY** **+23**	STG −19	**PAR** **−7**	SOU −11	NOR +6	**WES** **+21**	**NEW** **+16**	BAL −13	EAS +53	X	CBY +4	STG +2	PAR +4	**SOU** **+6**	X	**NEW** **+1**	X	BAL −3	
Newtown	EAS +7	CBY +7	**MAN** **+8**	**SOU** **+4**	PAR +7	NOR +8	**WES** **−1**	BAL −3	STG −17	**EAS** **+6**	**CBY** **−5**	MAN −16	SOU +10	**PAR** **−7**	X	**NOR** **+9**	WES −5	**BAL** **+2**	**STG** **−2**	**WES** **+15**	MAN −1			
North Sydney	MAN −10	**SOU** **+5**	**PAR** **+8**	**STG** **−1**	WES −5	**NEW** **−8**	BAL −20	**CBY** **+9**	**EAS** **+18**	**MAN** **−6**	SOU −22	PAR; 0	**STG** **−11**	**WES** **+9**	EAS +13	NEW −9	**BAL** **+5**	CBY −6	X					
Parramatta	**SOU** **−10**	**STG**; **0**	NOR −8	**WES** **+11**	**NEW** **−7**	BAL −9	**EAS** **+12**	MAN +7	CBY −2	SOU −16	STG −10	**NOR**; **0**	WES +10	NEW +7	X	**BAL** **+2**	EAS +9	**MAN** **−4**	**CBY** **+12**					
South Sydney	PAR +10	NOR −5	**WES** **+6**	NEW −4	**BAL** **−4**	EAS +7	CBY −4	**STG** **−28**	**MAN** **+11**	**PAR** **+16**	**NOR** **+22**	WES −4	**NEW** **−10**	BAL +8	X	**EAS** **+30**	**CBY** **+19**	**STG** **−29**	MAN −6					
St. George	BAL −3	PAR; 0	**EAS** **+26**	NOR +1	CBY +2	WES +28	**MAN** **+19**	SOU +28	**NEW** **+17**	BAL −7	**PAR** **+10**	EAS +15	NOR +11	**CBY** **+2**	X	**WES** **−3**	**MAN** **−2**	SOU +29	NEW +2	X	X	**BAL** **+8**	X	**BAL** **+19**
Western Suburbs	CBY +10	**MAN** **+7**	SOU −6	PAR −11	**NOR** **+5**	**STG** **−28**	NEW +1	**EAS** **+9**	BAL −5	CBY −3	MAN −21	**SOU** **+4**	**PAR** **−10**	NOR −9	X	STG +3	**NEW** **+5**	EAS +31	**BAL** **+5**	NEW −15				
Team	1	2	3	4	5	6	7	8	9	10	11	12	13	14	15	16	17	18	19	F1	F2	F3	F4	GF

Bold – Home game
X – Bye
Opponent for round listed above margin

=== Ladder ===
	Team	Pld	W	D	L	PF	PA	PD	Pts
1	St. George	18	13	1	4	331	156	+175	27
2	Balmain	18	12	0	6	279	203	+76	24
3	Manly	18	11	0	7	348	256	+92	22
4	Newtown	18	10	0	8	261	249	+12	20
5	Western Suburbs	18	10	0	8	228	241	-13	20
6	South Sydney	18	9	0	9	263	228	+35	18
7	Parramatta	18	8	2	8	236	232	+4	18
8	Canterbury	18	8	0	10	244	295	-51	16
9	North Sydney	18	7	1	10	282	313	-31	15
10	Eastern Suburbs	18	0	0	18	147	446	-299	0

=== Ladder progression ===
- Numbers highlighted in green indicate that the team finished the round inside the top 4.
- Numbers highlighted in blue indicates the team finished first on the ladder in that round.
- Numbers highlighted in red indicates the team finished last place on the ladder in that round.
- Underlined numbers indicate that the team had a bye during that round.

	Team	1	2	3	4	5	6	7	8	9	10	11	12	13	14	15	16	17	18	19
1	St. George	0	1	3	5	7	9	11	13	15	15	17	19	21	23	23	23	23	25	27
2	Balmain	2	4	6	8	10	12	14	16	18	20	22	22	24	24	24	24	24	24	24
3	Manly-Warringah	2	2	2	2	4	6	6	6	6	8	10	12	12	14	14	16	18	20	22
4	Newtown	2	4	6	8	10	12	12	12	12	14	14	14	16	16	16	18	18	20	20
5	Western Suburbs	2	4	4	4	6	6	8	10	10	10	10	12	12	12	12	14	16	18	20
6	South Sydney	2	2	4	4	4	6	6	6	8	10	12	12	12	14	14	16	18	18	18
7	Parramatta	0	1	1	3	3	3	5	7	7	7	7	8	10	12	12	14	16	16	18
8	Canterbury-Bankstown	0	0	0	2	2	2	4	4	6	8	10	12	14	14	14	14	14	16	16
9	North Sydney	0	2	4	4	4	4	4	6	8	8	8	9	9	11	13	13	15	15	15
10	Eastern Suburbs	0	0	0	0	0	0	0	0	0	0	0	0	0	0	0	0	0	0	0

== Finals ==
Home	Score	Away	Match Information
Home	Score	Away	Date and Time	Venue	Referee	Crowd
Playoff
Newtown	20–5	Western Suburbs	23 August 1966	Sydney Sports Ground	W.Kelly	10,724
Semi-finals
Manly-Warringah	10–9	Newtown	27 August 1966	Sydney Cricket Ground	Col Pearce	31,803
St. George	10–2	Balmain	3 September 1966	Sydney Cricket Ground	Col Pearce	46,531
Preliminary Final
Balmain	8–5	Manly-Warringah	10 September 1966	Sydney Cricket Ground	Col Pearce	39,461
Grand Final
St. George	23–4	Balmain	18 September 1966	Sydney Cricket Ground	Col Pearce	61,129

== Grand Final ==
1966 NSWRFL Grand Final

St. George	Balmain
23	4
	1	2	Total
STG	14	9	23
BAL	4	0	4
- Date: 17 September 1966
- Stadium: Sydney Cricket Ground
- Location: Sydney
- Man of the Match: John Raper (STG)
- Referee: Col Pearce
- Attendance: 61,129

Broadcast partners
- Broadcasters: ABC, Network Ten

=== Teams ===
Balmain had to replace John Spencer (broken hand) and George Piper (knee) in the days before the match after they suffered injuries in their win over Manly the previous week. Ken Maddison, Dick Huddart, and Trevor Levin made their Grand Final debuts for St. George. Brian Clay equalled Norm Provan's record of ten Grand Final appearances, having played two with Newtown before joining St. George.

Team details
St. George		Position	Balmain
Name	Number	Position	Number	Name
Graeme Langlands	1	FB	1	Keith Barnes (c)
Eddie Lumsden	2	WG	3	Paul Cross
Bruce Pollard	3	CE	2	Kevin Yow Yeh
Ken Maddison	4	CE	4	Laurie Moraschi
Johnny King	5	WG	5	Bob Mara
Brian Clay	6	FE	6	Peter Jones
Billy Smith	7	HB	7	Dave Bolton
Kevin Ryan	13	PR	13	Gary Leo
Ian Walsh (captain-coach)	12	HK	12	Bob Boland
Robin Gourley	11	PF	11	Brian Sullivan
Elton Rasmussen	10	SR	10	Dennis Tutty
Dick Huddart	9	SR	9	Arthur Beetson
Johnny Raper	8	LK	8	Peter Provan
Trevor Levin	21	Replacement	15	Dave Cooper
		Replacement	16	Sid Williams
		Coach		Harry Bath

=== Match details ===
Balmain had beaten St. George twice in the regular season and in their coach Harry Bath, who had helped design the Dragons win, had a tactician well placed to counter it. They had a number of young players in Arthur Beetson, Kevin Yow Yeh and Dennis Tutty who could trouble the Dragons, plus the experience of Dave Bolton, Peter Provan and the goal-kicking expertise of captain Keith Barnes.

The opening skirmishes on the day of the decider were balanced. Balmain took an early lead when Barnes kicked a penalty goal, while Graeme Langlands levelled the scores with a penalty goal a few minutes later following an injury break when Balmain halfback Dave Bolton needed medical attention. Bolton limped back into position, but was hampered by a leg injury. A couple of minutes later St. George's Billy Smith struck back when he set up a run around movement with Brian Clay, which led to a try to Bruce Pollard. Langlands kicked the conversion from the sideline to take the Dragons lead to 7–2.

The turning point of the match came soon after when the Dragons' English import Dick Huddart and Ian Walsh put on a set move as the Tigers' defence rushed up too early. Walsh bust through the line and with only the fullback to beat and passed the ball to Huddart who raced 30 yards to score. Due to the injury he sustained earlier in the match, Balmain halfback Dave Bolton left the field following the Huddart try receiving a pain-killing injection, but did return with bandages around his leg a few minutes later.

Trevor Levin came on after halftime for St. George in place of Robin Gourley, while for Balmain Sid Williams and Dave Cooper came on for Bolton and Brian Sullivan.

After about 12 minutes of the second half, Dragons halfback Billy Smith sliced through and found Johnny Raper who got to the Balmain 25-yard line before finding prop Kevin Ryan in support. It was a spectacular run from the evergreen forward who out-raced his pursuers and dived through the air to score and put the match beyond doubt.

Balmain had tried to slow down the Dragons with stifling tactics but this backfired and resulted in a lopsided penalty count. Classy Dragons fullback Graeme Langlands capitalised on this, kicking seven goals from 13 attempts, including 10 penalty goal attempts.

Huddart was dominant for the clinical Saints who did not concede a try for a staggering seventh time in eight grand final victories. He had been niggled early in the game by the Balmain forwards and responded by running freely all match and crashing the Tigers with fiery tackles.

With the full-time siren St George had won their 11th successive Grand Final, setting a record that is unlikely to be ever broken in first grade rugby league. It was their most convincing Grand Final win since 1961.

It was the last game played for the club by Dragons enforcer Kevin Ryan after seven Grand Final wins and also the farewell match for wing Eddie Lumsden who had appeared in nine of the victories.

After the match Balmain coach Harry Bath said "I knew we were gone after 15 minutes. Lack of experience... was a big factor."

=== Scoreboard ===
1966 NSWRFL Grand Final

Saturday, 17 September
15:00 AEST (UTC+10)

St. George	23 – 4	Balmain
Tries: 3 Pollard 12'; Huddart 19'; Ryan 54'; Goals: 7 Langlands pen 6', 13', 20', pen 32', pen 51', 55', pen 78' (7/13)	1st: 14-4; 2nd: 9-0	Goals: 2 Barnes pen 3', pen 38' (2/2)

Sydney Cricket Ground
Attendance: 61,129 (Note: Originally published as 60,079 during the television broadcast, but published sources state 61,129.)
Referee: Col Pearce
Player of the Match: John Raper

=== Other matches ===
South Sydney won the reserve grade Grand Final 12–5 against Balmain. Souths scored two converted tries and a penalty goal, while Balmain scored one converted try. It was Souths first reserve grade premiership in 10 years.

In the third grade Grand Final, St. George convincingly defeated South Sydney 12–4, scoring two tries in the first half.

== Player statistics ==
The following statistics are as of the conclusion of Round 18.

Top 5 point scorers

Points	Player	Tries	Goals	Field Goals
168	Bob Lanigan	2	81	0
167	Bob Batty	5	76	0
120	Keith Barnes	0	60	0
113	Fred Griffiths	3	52	0
110	Graeme Langlands	6	46	0

Top 5 try scorers

Tries	Player
13	Ken Irvine
11	Johnny King
11	Alec Tennant
11	Michael Cleary
10	John Mowbray
10	Fred Pickup

Top 5 goal scorers

Goals	Player
81	Bob Lanigan
76	Bob Batty
60	Keith Barnes
52	Fred Griffiths
48	George Taylforth
