= Rowing at the 2024 Summer Olympics – Women's double sculls =

Women's double sculls at the Games of the XXXIII Olympiad
- Olympic rowing
- Venue: Stade nautique de Vaires-sur-Marne, National Olympic Nautical Stadium of Île-de-France, Vaires-sur-Marne
- Dates: 27 July – 1 August 2024
- Competitors: 13 from 13 nations

Medalists
1st place, gold medalist(s)		Brooke Francis; Lucy Spoors	New Zealand
2nd place, silver medalist(s)		Ancuța Bodnar; Simona Radiș	Romania
3rd place, bronze medalist(s)		Mathilda Hodgkins-Byrne; Rebecca Wilde	Great Britain

The women's double sculls event at the 2024 Summer Olympics took place from 27 July to 1 August 2024 at the Stade nautique de Vaires-sur-Marne, National Olympic Nautical Stadium of Île-de-France, Vaires-sur-Marne.

== Background ==
This is the 13th appearance of the event, which was introduced at the 1976 Games.

== Qualification ==
Each National Olympic Committee (NOC) was limited to a single boat (one rower) in the event since 1912.

== Competition format ==
This rowing event is a double scull event, meaning that each boat is propelled by two rowers. The "scull" portion means that the rower uses two oars, one on each side of the boat; this contrasts with sweep rowing in which each rower has one oar and rows on only one side. The competition consists of multiple rounds. The competition continues to use the three-round format. Finals are held to determine the placing of each boat. The course uses the 2000 metres distance that became the Olympic standard in 1912.

During the first round three heats were held. The first three boats in each heat advanced to the semifinals, with the others relegated to the repechages.

The repechage is a round which offered rowers a second chance to qualify for the semifinals. Placing in the repechage determined which semifinal the boat would race in. The top three boats in the repechage move on to the semifinals, with the remaining boats being eliminated.

Two semifinals were held, each with 6 boats. The top three boats from each heat advanced to Final A and compete for a medal. The remaining boats advanced to Final B.

The third and final round was the finals. Each final determines a set of rankings. The A final determined the medals, along with the rest of the places through 6th, while the B final gives rankings from 7th to 12th.

== Schedule ==
The competition is being held over six days.

All times are Central European Summer Time (UTC+2)

Date	Time	Round
Saturday, 27 July 2024	12:00	Heats
Sunday, 28 July 2024	10:10	Repechage
Tuesday, 30 July 2024	10:50	Semifinals A/B
Thursday, 1 August 2024	10:30	Final B
Thursday, 1 August 2024	11:18	Final A

== Results ==
=== Heats ===
The first three of each heat qualified for the semifinals, while the remainder went to the repechage.

==== Heat 1 ====
Rank	Lane	Rower	Nation	Time	Notes
1	2	Brooke Francis; Lucy Spoors	New Zealand	6:51.68	Q
2	5	Mathilda Hodgkins-Byrne; Rebecca Wilde	Great Britain	6:52.31	Q
3	4	Sophia Vitas; Kristi Wagner	United States	6:56.47	Q
4	1	Lisa Scheenaard; Martine Veldhuis	Netherlands	6:58.65	R
5	3	Clara Guerra; Stefania Gobbi	Italy	7:15.51	R

==== Heat 2 ====
Rank	Lane	Rower	Nation	Time	Notes
1	3	Elodie Ravera; Emma Lunatti	France	6:48.89	Q
2	2	Amanda Bateman; Harriet Hudson	Australia	6:49.21	Q
3	1	Zoe Hyde; Alison Bergin	Ireland	6:52.61	Q
4	4	Donata Karalienė; Dovilė Rimkutė	Lithuania	6:59.62	R

==== Heat 3 ====
Rank	Lane	Rower	Nation	Time	Notes
1	3	Ancuța Bodnar; Simona Radiș	Romania	6:48.49	Q
2	4	Anna Šantrůčková; Lenka Lukšová	Czech Republic	6:55.16	Q
3	1	Shen Shuangmei; Lu Shiyu	China	6:58.85	Q
4	2	Thea Helseth; Inger Kavlie	Norway	7:00.78	R

=== Repechage ===
The first three doubles in the repechage qualified for the semifinals, while the fourth was eliminated.

==== Repechage heat 1 ====
Rank	Lane	Rower	Nation	Time	Notes
1	2	Lisa Scheenaard; Martine Veldhuis	Netherlands	7:08.42	Q
2	3	Thea Helseth; Inger Kavlie	Norway	7:10.39	Q
3	4	Clara Guerra; Stefania Gobbi	Italy	7:10.41	Q
4	1	Donata Karalienė; Dovilė Rimkutė	Lithuania	7:15.00	

=== Semifinals ===
The first three of each heat qualify to the Final A, other to Final B

==== Semifinal A/B 1 ====
Rank	Lane	Rower	Nation	Time	Notes
1	3	Brooke Francis; Lucy Spoors	New Zealand	6:49.49	FA
2	1	Lisa Scheenaard; Martine Veldhuis	Netherlands	6:50.20	FA
3	4	Elodie Ravera; Emma Lunatti	France	6:51.30	FA
4	2	Anna Šantrůčková; Lenka Lukšová	Czech Republic	6:54.76	FB
5	5	Zoe Hyde; Alison Bergin	Ireland	6:55.08	FB
6	6	Clara Guerra; Stefania Gobbi	Italy	6:58.08	FB

==== Semifinal A/B 2 ====
Rank	Lane	Rower	Nation	Time	Notes
1	4	Ancuța Bodnar; Simona Radiș	Romania	6:51.41	FA
2	5	Mathilda Hodgkins-Byrne; Rebecca Wilde	Great Britain	6:51.82	FA
3	1	Thea Helseth; Inger Kavlie	Norway	6:52.47	FA
4	3	Amanda Bateman; Harriet Hudson	Australia	6:52.69	FB
5	2	Sophia Vitas; Kristi Wagner	United States	7:04.12	FB
6	6	Shen Shuangmei; Lu Shiyu	China	7:09.75	FB

=== Finals ===
==== Final B ====
Rank	Lane	Rower	Nation	Time
7	4	Amanda Bateman; Harriet Hudson	Australia	6:47.66
8	3	Anna Šantrůčková; Lenka Lukšová	Czech Republic	6:49.92
9	5	Sophia Vitas; Kristi Wagner	United States	6:50.74
10	2	Zoe Hyde; Alison Bergin	Ireland	6:55.62
11	1	Clara Guerra; Stefania Gobbi	Italy	6:56.87
12	6	Shen Shuangmei; Lu Shiyu	China	7:00.71

==== Final A ====
Rank	Lane	Rower	Nation	Time
1st place, gold medalist(s)	3	Brooke Francis; Lucy Spoors	New Zealand	6:50.45
2nd place, silver medalist(s)	4	Ancuța Bodnar; Simona Radiș	Romania	6:50.69
3rd place, bronze medalist(s)	2	Mathilda Hodgkins-Byrne; Rebecca Wilde	Great Britain	6:53.22
4	5	Lisa Scheenaard; Martine Veldhuis	Netherlands	6:54.24
5	6	Elodie Ravera; Emma Lunatti	France	6:57.35
6	1	Thea Helseth; Inger Kavlie	Norway	6:58.41
