= 2022 World Rowing Championships – Women's double sculls =

Women's double sculls at the 2022 World Rowing Championships
- Venue: Labe aréna
- Location: Račice, Czech Republic
- Dates: 19 September – 25 September
- Competitors: 35 from 17 nations
- Winning time: 6:47.77

Medalists
gold medal	Nicoleta-Ancuța Bodnar; Simona Radiș	Romania
silver medal	Roos de Jong; Laila Youssifou	Netherlands
bronze medal	Sanita Pušpure; Zoe Hyde	Ireland

The women's double sculls competition at the 2022 World Rowing Championships took place at the Račice regatta venue.

== Schedule ==
The schedule was as follows:

Date	Time	Round
Monday 19 September 2022	10:50	Heats
Wednesday 21 September 2022	12:00	Repechages
Friday 23 September 2022	12:16	Semifinals A/B
Sunday 25 September 2022	11:40	Final C
Sunday 25 September 2022	12:36	Final B
Sunday 25 September 2022	13:54	Final A

All times are Central European Summer Time (UTC+2)

== Results ==
=== Heats ===
The two fastest boats in each heat advanced directly to the semifinals. The remaining boats were sent to the repechages.

==== Heat 1 ====
Rank	Rower	Country	Time	Notes
1	Sanita Pušpure; Zoe Hyde	Ireland	6:54.49	SA/B
2	Katharina Lobnig; Magdalena Lobnig	Austria	6:59.51	SA/B
3	Xu Yingying; Shen Shuangmei	China	6:32.81	R
4	Elisa Bolinger; Marilou Duvernay Tardif	Canada	7:01.35	R
5	Stefania Gobbi; Kiri Tontodonati	Italy	6:52.61	R
6	Violaine Aernoudts; Margaux Bailleul	France	7:02.77	R

==== Heat 2 ====
Rank	Rower	Country	Time	Notes
1	Roos de Jong; Laila Youssifou	Netherlands	6:53.58	SA/B
2	Kristina Wagner; Sophia Vitas	United States	6:55.45	SA/B
3	Frauke Hundeling; Pia Greiten	Germany	6:58.96	R
4	Thea Helseth; Jenny Marie Rorvik	Norway	7:03.05	R
5	Markéta Nedělová; Alice Prokešová	Czech Republic	7:15.30	R
6	Yariulvis Cobas; Milena Venega	Cuba	7:25.10	R

==== Heat 3 ====
Rank	Rower	Country	Time	Notes
1	Nicoleta-Ancuța Bodnar; Simona Radiș	Romania	6:51.82	SA/B
2	Kyra Edwards; Saskia Budgett	Great Britain	7:00.62	SA/B
3	Anastasiia Kozhenkova; Diana Serebrianska	Ukraine	7:03.26	R
4	Nina Wettstein; Fabienne Schweizer	Switzerland	7:05.53	R
5	Evangelia Fragkou; Styliani Natsioula	Greece	7:19.08	R

=== Repechages ===
The three fastest boats in repechage advanced to the semifinals. The remaining boats sent to the Final C.

==== Repechage 1 ====
Rank	Rower	Country	Time	Notes
1	Anastasiia Kozhenkova; Diana Serebrianska	Ukraine	7:08.74	SA/B
2	Thea Helseth; Jenny Marie Rorvik	Norway	7:10.20	SA/B
3	Xu Yingying; Shen Shuangmei	China	7:12.30	SA/B
4	Violaine Aernoudts; Margaux Bailleul	France	7:12.37	FC
5	Evangelia Fragkou; Styliani Natsioula	Greece	7:17.17	FC
6	Yariulvis Cobas; Milena Venega	Cuba	7:28.57	FC

==== Repechage 2 ====
Rank	Rower	Country	Time	Notes
1	Frauke Hundeling; Pia Greiten	Germany	7:07.91	SA/B
2	Nina Wettstein; Fabienne Schweizer	Switzerland	7:10.09	SA/B
3	Elisa Bolinger; Marilou Duvernay Tardif	Canada	7:10.39	SA/B
4	Stefania Gobbi; Kiri Tontodonati	Italy	7:12.67	FC
5	Markéta Nedělová; Alice Prokešová	Czech Republic	7:17.58	FC

=== Semifinals A/B ===
The three fastest boats in each semi advanced to the A final. The remaining boats were sent to the B final.

==== Semifinal 1 ====
Rank	Rower	Country	Time	Notes
1	Roos de Jong; Laila Youssifou	Netherlands	6:52.40	FA
2	Sanita Pušpure; Zoe Hyde	Ireland	6:53.82	FA
3	Frauke Hundeling; Pia Greiten	Germany	6:56.21	FA
4	Thea Helseth; Jenny Marie Rorvik	Norway	6:59.97	FB
5	Kyra Edwards; Saskia Budgett	Great Britain	7:02.33	FB
6	Elisa Bolinger; Marilou Duvernay Tardif	Canada	7:04.85	FB

==== Semifinal 2 ====
Rank	Rower	Country	Time	Notes
1	Nicoleta-Ancuța Bodnar; Simona Radiș	Romania	6:46.97	FA
2	Katharina Lobnig; Magdalena Lobnig	Austria	6:50.17	FA
3	Kristina Wagner; Sophia Vitas	United States	6:51.53	FA
4	Anastasiia Kozhenkova; Diana Serebrianska	Ukraine	6:51.65	FB
5	Xu Yingying; Shen Shuangmei	China	7:04.85	FB
6	Nina Wettstein; Fabienne Schweizer	Switzerland	7:07.43	FB

=== Finals ===
The A final determined the rankings for places 1 to 6. Additional rankings were determined in the other finals

==== Final C ====
Rank	Rower	Country	Time	Total rank
1	Violaine Aernoudts; Margaux Bailleul	France	7:03.13	13
2	Stefania Gobbi; Kiri Tontodonati	Italy	7:08.67	14
3	Evangelia Fragkou; Styliani Natsioula	Greece	7:13.09	15
4	Yariulvis Cobas; Milena Venega	Cuba	7:20.50	16
5	Markéta Nedělová; Veronika Činková	Czech Republic	7:24.78	17

==== Final B ====
Rank	Rower	Country	Time	Total rank
1	Anastasiia Kozhenkova; Diana Serebrianska	Ukraine	6:57.46	7
2	Kyra Edwards; Saskia Budgett	Great Britain	6:59.66	8
3	Xu Yingying; Shen Shuangmei	China	7:01.03	9
4	Thea Helseth; Jenny Marie Rorvik	Norway	7:02.68	10
5	Elisa Bolinger; Marilou Duvernay Tardif	Canada	7:06.00	11
6	Nina Wettstein; Fabienne Schweizer	Switzerland	7:08.85	12

==== Final A ====
Rank	Rower	Country	Time	Notes
1st place, gold medalist(s)	Nicoleta-Ancuța Bodnar; Simona Radiș	Romania	6:47.77	
2nd place, silver medalist(s)	Roos de Jong; Laila Youssifou	Netherlands	6:51.02	
3rd place, bronze medalist(s)	Sanita Pušpure; Zoe Hyde	Ireland	6:52.81	
4	Katharina Lobnig; Magdalena Lobnig	Austria	6:54.62	
5	Kristina Wagner; Sophia Vitas	United States	7:00.49	
6	Frauke Hundeling; Pia Greiten	Germany	7:04.29	
