= Scott Gourley =

Australian rugby league and rugby union footballer

- Born: Scott Robert Gourley; 18 July 1968 (age 58) Hornsby, New South Wales, Australia
- University: University of Sydney
- Notable relative(s): Robin Gourley (father); Laura Gourley (niece)

Rugby union career
- Position: Lock
Amateur team(s)
Years	Team	Apps	(Points)
1987–1988	Eastwood RUFC		
International career
Years	Team	Apps	(Points)
1988–89	Australia	5	
- Rugby league career

Playing information
- Position: Second-row
Club
Years	Team	Pld	T	G	FG	P
1990–96	St George	128				116
1997–98	Sydney Roosters	45				40
	Total	173	0	0	0	156
Representative
Years	Team	Pld	T	G	FG	P
1991	Australia	1				0
1993	New South Wales	1				0

Scott Robert Gourley (born 18 July 1968) is an Australian former rugby league and rugby union footballer who played from 1986 to 1998 and achieved the status of a dual-code international representing his country in both sports. He made five Test appearances for the Wallabies and switched to rugby league in 1990 playing for the St George Dragons, the Sydney Roosters and making one Test appearance for the Kangaroos.

== Background ==
Gourley was born in Hornsby, New South Wales, Australia, raised in Narrabri and attended Narrabri High School. He studied economics at the University of Sydney. He is of Irish descent through his father, the former Irish rugby union international Robin Gourley, who played in the St George rugby league premiership winning sides of 1965 and 1966.

== Rugby union career ==
Before moving to Sydney, Gourley captained the Australian Schoolboys rugby union side on their 1986 tour of New Zealand. His Sydney club rugby was played with the Eastwood RUFC. He was selected for the 1988 Australia rugby union tour of England, Scotland and Italy and made his Test debut for the Wallabies against Scotland at Murrayfield scoring a try on debut. He played a Test against Italy on that same tour. He earned five international rugby union Test caps between 1988 and 1989 as a flanker. He was a prominent member of the side, with some fearsome displays of running against the touring British Lions in 1989. Gourley is remembered for a magnificent try scored in the first Test of that series at the Sydney Football Stadium, running through several tacklers to cross the line at the northern end of the ground.

== Rugby league career ==
Switching to rugby league in 1990, Gourley joined the St George Dragons where his father had played. Scott played 128 games for the Dragons from 1990 to 1996 including being in three losing grand final sides: 1992 and 1993 against the Brisbane Broncos, and 1996 against Manly. In 1997, he joined the Sydney Roosters and played 45 matches in his two seasons at the club.

Gourley represented Australia in 1991 in a Test series against Papua New Guinea. His international rugby league debut in the first Test against PNG in Goroka saw him become Australia's 39th dual-code rugby international, following Ricky Stuart and preceding Andrew Walker. He is the last Australian dual-code international to have debuted in rugby league following a rugby union representative career. All others since have made the converse switch.

In addition to representing Australia, he was selected for New South Wales in one State of Origin match in 1993.

== Personal ==
Following his retirement in 1998, Gourley became a private investor. In a 2011 interview he confirmed that due to his wife's business career he had chosen to be a stay-at-home father for his three children whilst managing personal share market and real estate investments.

== Sources ==
- Andrews, Malcolm (2006) The ABC of Rugby League Austn Broadcasting Corpn, Sydney
