= 1966 Eastern Suburbs season =

← 1965	1967 →

Eastern Suburbs (now known as the Sydney Roosters) competed in their 59th New South Wales Rugby League season in 1966.

== Eastern Suburbs line-up ==
- Gwyl Barnes
- Kevin Junee
- Ron Saddler
- J. Mathews
- T. Gallagher
- Kevin Ashley
- C. Boyd
- R. Henspy
- G. Morgan
- Terry Mathews
- D. McCraig
- Ken McMullen
- T. Higham
- Ken Ashcroft
- J. Bissett
- G. Mayhew

== Season summary ==
- This was Eastern Suburbs' worst ever season, failing to win a single match and finishing with the wooden spoon - the fourth in the club's history and its last until 2009. As of 2026, this remains the last time any team would go through an Australian rugby league season winless, and no team would finish a season on zero points again until the Melbourne Storm finished last in the 2010 NRL season as punishment for gross salary cap breaches uncovered by the NRL in April that year.

Preceded by 1965	Season; 1966	Succeeded by 1967
