= Trevor Levin =

Australian rugby league footballer

Personal information
- Full name: Trevor Levin
- Born: Sydney, New South Wales, Australia

Playing information
- Position: Forward
Club
Years	Team	Pld	T	G	FG	P
1966	St. George	4	0	0	0	0
1967–69	Cronulla-Sutherland	15	0	0	0	0
	Total	19	0	0	0	0

Trevor Levin is an Australian former rugby league footballer who played in the 1960s.

== Playing career ==
Levin was a reserve grade prop-forward with St. George.Levin won a reserve grade premiership with St.George in 1964. He is remembered as the replacement for Robin Gourley in the victorious team that won the 1966 Grand Final.

He left Saints the following year to join Cronulla-Sutherland. Levin played at Cronulla for three years between 1967 and 1969.
