= England at the European Championships =

- WA code: ENG
- Medals: Gold 0 Silver 0 Bronze 0 Total 0

European Championships appearances (overview)
- 2018; 2022

A team representing England has competed in the European Championships since the second event in 2022.

Competitors in table tennis events are listed as representing England as each home nation of the United Kingdom has separate membership of the European Table Tennis Union which organises the table tennis competition at the European Championships. In all other sports, competitors from England compete as part of the Great Britain and Northern Ireland team.

== Medal count ==
Games	Athletes	Gold	Silver	Bronze	Total
(United Kingdom) / (Germany) 2018 Glasgow and Berlin	Did not participate				
(Germany) 2022 Munich (details)	5	0	0	0	0
Total		0	0	0	0

== See also ==
- Great Britain at the European Championships
- Sport in England
- England at the Commonwealth Games
- Table Tennis England
