= Great Britain at the European Championships =

- WA code: GBR
- NOC: British Olympic Association
- Website: https://www.teamgb.com/
- Medals Ranked 1st: Gold 50 Silver 45 Bronze 39 Total 134

European Championships appearances (overview)
- 2018; 2022

The United Kingdom, under the designation Great Britain and Northern Ireland, has competed in the European Championships since the inaugural event in 2018. Great Britain is the most successful country at the European Championships, winning 50 gold medals and 134 overall. The country finished second in the medal table in both 2018 and 2022, but by total medals finished first in 2018 and joint first in 2022.

Competitors in table tennis events are listed as representing their home nation rather than Great Britain as England, Scotland and Wales each have their own membership of the European Table Tennis Union which organises the table tennis competition at the European Championships.

== Medal count ==
Games	Athletes	Gold	Silver	Bronze	Total
(United Kingdom) / (Germany) 2018 Glasgow and Berlin (details)	313	26	26	22	74
(Germany) 2022 Munich (details)	236	24	19	17	60
Total		50	45	39	134

== See also ==
- England at the European Championships
- Great Britain at the Olympics
- Great Britain at the European Games
