= England at the 2022 European Championships =

in (Germany) Munich 11 August 2018 – 21 August 2018
- Competitors: 5 in 1 sport
- Medals: Gold 0 Silver 0 Bronze 0 Total 0

European Championships appearances (overview)
- 2018; 2022

A team of five competitors listed as representing England competed at the 2022 European Championships in Munich, Germany, from 11 to 21 August 2022 in table tennis events. In all other sports, competitors from England competed as part of the Great Britain and Northern Ireland team.

== Competitors ==
The following is the list of number of competitors in the Championships:

Sport	Men	Women	Total
Table tennis	3	2	5

== Table Tennis ==
Men

- Tom Jarvis
- Liam Pitchford
- Sam Walker

Women

- Charlotte Bardsley
- Tin-Tin Ho

=== Singles ===
Athletes	Event	Group stage			Round of 64	Round of 32	Round of 16	Quarterfinal	Semifinal	Final / BM	
Athletes	Event	Opposition Score	Opposition Score	Rank	Opposition Score	Opposition Score	Opposition Score	Opposition Score	Opposition Score	Opposition Score	Rank
Tom Jarvis	Men's singles	Putuntica (MDA); W 3–2	Glod (LUX); W 3–0	1 Q	Jancarik (CZE); L 3–4	did not advance					
Liam Pitchford	Men's singles	Bye			Polansky (CZE); W 4–1	Apolónia (POR); L 2–4	did not advance				
Sam Walker	Men's singles	Jevtovic (SRB); W 3–1	Yiğenler (TUR); W 3–0	1 Q	Persson (SWE); L 2–4	did not advance					
Charlotte Bardsley	Women's singles	Arlia (ITA); W 3–2	Hanson (EST); W 3–0	1 Q	Shao (POR); L 0–4	did not advance					
Tin-Tin Ho	Women's singles	De Loop (NED); W 3–0	Wegrzyn (POL); W 3–0	1 Q	De Nutte (LUX); W 4–3	Polcanova (AUT); L 1–4	did not advance				

=== Doubles ===
Athletes	Event	Preliminary Round 1	Preliminary Round 2	Round of 32	Round of 16	Quarterfinal	Semifinal	Final / BM	
Athletes	Event	Opposition Score	Opposition Score	Opposition Score	Opposition Score	Opposition Score	Opposition Score	Opposition Score	Rank
Tom Jarvis; Sam Walker	Men's doubles	Bye		Andersen & Rasmussen (DEN); L 0–3	did not advance				
Liam Pitchford; Jonathan Groth (DEN)	Men's doubles	Bye	Karabaxhak (KOS) & Mladenovski (MKD); W 3–0	Karakašević (SRB) & Pištej (SVK); L 2–3	did not advance				
Tin-Tin Ho; Karoline Mischek (AUT)	Women's doubles	Bye		Brateyko (UKR) & Malobabic (CRO); W 3–2	Matelova (CZE) & Balazova (SVK); L 0–3	did not advance			
Tom Jarvis; Charlotte Bardsley	Mixed doubles	Bye	Konstantinopoulos & Toliou (GRE); W 3–0	Gardos & Polcanova (AUT); L 1–3	did not advance				
Liam Pitchford; Tin-Tin Ho	Mixed doubles	Bye		Kulczycki & Wegrzyn (POL); L 2–3	did not advance				

== See also ==
- Great Britain and Northern Ireland at the 2022 European Championships
