= Rowing at the 2026 Asian Games – Women's double sculls =

Women's double sculls at the 2026 Asian Games
- Venue: Nagaragawa International Regatta Course
- Date: 23–24 September 2026
- Competitors: 12 from 6 nations

Medalists
gold medal	Wang Sixuan; Shen Shuangmei	China
silver medal	Kimia Zareei; Zeinab Norouzi	Iran
bronze medal	Trần Thị Tú Uyên; Phạm Thị Bích Ngọc	Vietnam

The women's double sculls competition at the 2026 Asian Games was held from 23 to 24 September 2026 at the Nagaragawa International Regatta Course, Gifu, Japan.

== Schedule ==
All times are Japan Standard Time (UTC+09:00)

Date	Time	Event
Wednesday, 23 September 2026	14:20	Preliminary race
Thursday, 24 September 2026	14:30	Final

== Results ==
=== Preliminary race ===
- Qualification: All → Final (FA)

Rank	Team	Time	Notes
1	China (CHN); Wang Sixuan; Shen Shuangmei	7:17.90	FA
2	Iran (IRI); Kimia Zareei; Zeinab Norouzi	7:31.68	FA
3	South Korea (KOR); Kim Seung-hyeon; Park Ji-youn	7:34.80	FA
4	Vietnam (VIE); Trần Thị Tú Uyên; Phạm Thị Bích Ngọc	7:40.80	FA
5	Japan (JPN); Sachino Inoue; Chiharu Aizawa	7:46.20	FA
6	Chinese Taipei (TPE); Chang Chu; Wang Ming-xuan	7:53.01	FA

=== Final ===
Rank	Team	Time
1st place, gold medalist(s)	China (CHN); Wang Sixuan; Shen Shuangmei	6:45.99
2nd place, silver medalist(s)	Iran (IRI); Kimia Zareei; Zeinab Norouzi	6:55.78
3rd place, bronze medalist(s)	Vietnam (VIE); Trần Thị Tú Uyên; Phạm Thị Bích Ngọc	7:02.68
4	South Korea (KOR); Kim Seung-hyeon; Park Ji-youn	7:05.82
5	Japan (JPN); Sachino Inoue; Chiharu Aizawa	7:08.45
6	Chinese Taipei (TPE); Chang Chu; Wang Ming-xuan	7:16.54
