= Paige Badenhorst =

South African rower (born 1998)

Personal information
- Nationality: South African
- Born: 14 August 1998 (age 28) Durban, South Africa

Sport
- Sport: Rowing

Paige Badenhorst (born 14 August 1998) is a South African rower. She competed in The Boat Race 2022 and the 2024 Paris Olympics.

== Early and personal life ==
From Benoni in South Africa, she studied for a MPhil in management at Magdalene College, Cambridge, having previously completed a degree in organisational studies and environment at the University of Michigan.

== Career ==
She was part of a South African crew of eight at the Junior World Championships in Rotterdam. She competed for Cambridge in The Boat Race 2022.

In May 2023, alongside Katherine Williams, she won bronze at the first Rowing World Cup in Zagreb, Croatia, in May 2023. She competed in the double sculls at the 2023 World Rowing Championships in Belgrade.

She competed alongside Katherine Williams in the double sculls in 2024. She later also beat Williams in a race-off to gain a place in the single sculls at the 2024 Paris Olympics.

She placed eighth overall in the single sculls at the 2025 World Rowing Championships in Shanghai, China.
