= Tommy Ramdhan =

British sprinter (born 1996)

Personal information
- Nationality: Great Britain
- Born: 28 November 1996 (age 29) Greenwich, South East London

Sport
- Sport: Track and Field
- Event(s): 100 m, 200 m
Medal record
European Championships
Gold medal – first place	2022 Munich	4 × 100 m relay
European Junior Championships
Gold medal – first place	2015 Eskilstuna	200 m

Tommy Ramdhan (born 28 November 1996) is a British track and field athlete who competes in 100 m, 200 m, and 4 × 100 m relay races.

== Early life ==
Ramdhan was born in Greenwich, southeast London, and attended Hurstmere School in Sidcup, Kent. Ramdhan was a rugby union player on the books at the academy of Saracens RFC before concentrating on athletics. He completed a BTEC Extended Diploma in Sport Coaching & Fitness at Oaklands College in Hertfordshire, and also attended Loughborough College.

== Career ==
Ramdhan won gold in the 200 m at the 2015 European Athletics Junior Championships, winning in a wind assisted time of 20.57 seconds ahead of compatriot Elliott Powell in Eskilstuna, Sweden.

In June 2019 Ramdhan competed at the Oslo Diamond League event finishing seventh behind then world leader Christian Coleman. In September 2020, Ramdhan won bronze at the British national championships 100 m race, running 10.44 seconds in Manchester.

Ramdhan was part of the British team 2022 European Athletics Championships. He ran 4th leg of the 4 × 100 metres relay that won their semi-final to qualify for the final where the team went on to win gold in the final.
