= Great Britain and Northern Ireland at the 2022 European Championships =

Great Britain at the 2022 European Championships

in (Germany) Munich 11 August 2022 – 22 August 2022
- Competitors: 252 in 9 sports
- Medals Ranked 2nd: Gold 24 Silver 19 Bronze 17 Total 60

European Championships appearances (overview)
- 2018; 2022

The United Kingdom, designated as Great Britain and Northern Ireland, will compete at the 2022 European Championships in Munich from August 11 to August 22, 2022. In table tennis, the five British competitors were listed as representing England.

== Medallists ==
Medal	Name	Sport	Event	Date
Gold	Non Stanford	Triathlon	Women's	12 August
Gold	Heidi Long; Rowan McKellar; Samantha Redgrave; Rebecca Shorten	Rowing	Women's coxless four	13 August
Gold	William Stewart; Sam Nunn; Matthew Aldridge; Freddie Davidson	Rowing	Men's coxless four	13 August
Gold	Jessica Leyden; Lola Anderson; Georgina Megan Brayshaw; Lucy Glover	Rowing	Women's quadruple sculls	13 August
Gold	Rory Gibbs; Morgan Bolding; David Bewicke-Copley; Sholto Carnegie; Charles Elwes; Thomas Digby; James Rudkin; Tom Ford; Harry Brightmore	Rowing	Men's eight	13 August
Gold	Francesca Allen; Giedrė Rakauskaitė; Edward Fuller; Oliver Stanhope; Erin Kennedy	Rowing	Mixed PR3 coxed four	14 August
Gold	Emily Craig; Imogen Grant	Rowing	Women's lightweight double sculls	14 August
Gold	Jessica Gadirova	Gymnastics	Women's floor exercise	14 August
Gold	Matthew Hudson-Smith	Athletics	Men's 400 metres	17 August
Gold	Joe Fraser	Gymnastics	Men's individual all-around	18 August
Gold	Charlotte Henshaw	Canoeing	Women's VL3 200 metres	19 August
Gold	Jack Eyers	Canoeing	Men's VL3 200 metres	19 August
Gold	Emma Wiggs	Canoeing	Women's VL2 200 metres	19 August
Gold	Tom Pidcock	Cycling mountain bike	Men's cross-country	19 August
Gold	Laura Muir	Athletics	Women's 1500 metres	19 August
Gold	Zharnel Hughes	Athletics	Men's 200 metres	19 August
Gold	Joe Fraser; James Hall; Jake Jarman; Giarnni Regini-Moran; Courtney Tulloch	Gymnastics	Men's team all-around	20 August
Gold	Keely Hodgkinson	Athletics	Women's 800 metres	20 August
Gold	Matthew Hudson-Smith; Charlie Dobson; Lewis Davey; Alex Haydock-Wilson (Ran in heat); Joe Brier; Rio Mitcham	Athletics	Men's 4 × 400 metres relay	20 August
Gold	Laura Sugar	Canoeing	Women's KL3 200 metres	21 August
Gold	Emma Wiggs	Canoeing	Women's KL2 200 metres	21 August
Gold	Jeremiah Azu; Zharnel Hughes; Jona Efoloko; Nethaneel Mitchell-Blake; Harry Aikines-Aryeetey; Tommy Ramdhan	Athletics	Men's 4 × 100 metres relay	21 August
Gold	Joe Fraser	Gymnastics	Men's parallel bars	21 August
Gold	Jake Jarman	Gymnastics	Men's vault	21 August
Silver	Alice Kinsella	Gymnastics	Women's individual all-around	11 August
Silver	Jessica Roberts	Cycling track	Women's scratch	12 August
Silver	Emily Ford; Esme Booth	Rowing	Women's coxless pair	13 August
Silver	Oliver Wynne-Griffith; Tom George	Rowing	Men's coxless pair	13 August
Silver	Ondine Achampong; Georgia-Mae Fenton; Jennifer Gadirova; Jessica Gadirova; Alice Kinsella	Gymnastics	Women's team all-around	13 August
Silver	Kieran Reilly	Cycling BMX	Men's BMX freestyle	13 August
Silver	Pfeiffer Georgi	Cycling track	Women's elimination race	13 August
Silver	Rebecca Edwards; Lauren Irwin; Emily Ford; Esme Booth; Samantha Redgrave; Rebecca Shorten; Rowan McKellar; Heidi Long; Morgan Baynham-Williams	Rowing	Women's eight	14 August
Silver	Ondine Achampong	Gymnastics	Women's balance beam	14 August
Silver	Jack Carlin	Cycling track	Men's sprint	14 August
Silver	Eilish McColgan	Athletics	Women's 10,000 metres	15 August
Silver	Zharnel Hughes	Athletics	Men's 100 metres	16 August
Silver	Jake Heyward	Athletics	Men's 1500 metres	18 August
Silver	Hope Gordon	Canoeing	Women's VL3 200 metres	19 August
Silver	Jeanette Chippington	Canoeing	Women's VL2 200 metres	19 August
Silver	Nethaneel Mitchell-Blake	Athletics	Men's 200 metres	19 August
Silver	Dina Asher-Smith	Athletics	Women's 200 metres	19 August
Silver	Charlotte Henshaw	Canoeing	Women's KL2 200 metres	21 August
Silver	Jake Wightman	Athletics	Men's 800 metres	21 August
Bronze	Rhys Britton; Oliver Wood; Charlie Tanfield; Kian Emadi; Will Tidball	Cycling track	Men's team pursuit	12 August
Bronze	Alistair Fielding; Jack Carlin; Hamish Turnbull	Cycling track	Men's team sprint	12 August
Bronze	Benjamin Pritchard	Rowing	Men's PR1 single sculls	13 August
Bronze	Jeremiah Azu	Athletics	Men's 100 metres	16 August
Bronze	Daryll Neita	Athletics	Women's 100 metres	16 August
Bronze	Alex Haydock-Wilson	Athletics	Men's 400 metres	17 August
Bronze	Eilish McColgan	Athletics	Women's 5000 metres	18 August
Bronze	Jazmin Sawyers	Athletics	Women's long jump	18 August
Bronze	Lawrence Okoye	Athletics	Men's discus throw	19 August
Bronze	Victoria Ohuruogu; Ama Pipi; Jodie Williams; Nicole Yeargin (Ran in heat); Zoey Clark; Laviai Nielsen	Athletics	Women's 4 × 400 metres relay	20 August
Bronze	Lizzie Bird	Athletics	Women's 3000 metres steeplechase	20 August
Bronze	Hope Gordon	Canoeing	Women's KL3 200 metres	21 August
Bronze	Jonny Young	Canoeing	Men's KL3 200 metres	21 August
Bronze	David Phillipson	Canoeing	Men's KL2 200 metres	21 August
Bronze	Jake Jarman	Gymnastics	Men's floor	21 August
Bronze	Giarnni Regini-Moran	Gymnastics	Men's parallel bars	21 August
Bronze	Courtney Tulloch	Gymnastics	Men's rings	21 August

== Competitors ==
The following is the list of number of competitors in the Championships:

Sport	Men	Women	Total
Athletics	54	60	114
Canoe sprint	14	16	30
Cycling BMX	3	2	5
Cycling mountain bike	2	1	3
Cycling track	8	8	16
Gymnastics (men and women)	5	5	10
Rowing	27	23	50
Sport climbing	6	7	13
Table tennis	0	0	0
Triathlon	7	4	11
Total	126	126	252

== Athletics ==
Great Britain entered the following athletes.

Key

- Q = Qualified for the next round
- q = Qualified for the next round as a fastest loser or, in field events, by position without achieving the qualifying target
- NR = National record
- PB = Personal best
- SB = Season best
- N/A = Round not applicable for the event

=== Men ===
Track & road events

Athlete	Event	Heat		Semifinal		Final	
Athlete	Event	Result	Rank	Result	Rank	Result	Rank
Jeremiah Azu	100 m	Bye		10.17	2 Q	10.13	3rd place, bronze medalist(s)
Ojie Edoburun	100 m	Bye		10.25	6	Did not advance	
Zharnel Hughes	100 m	Bye		10.03	1 Q	9.99	2nd place, silver medalist(s)
Reece Prescod	100 m	Bye		10.10	1 Q	10.18	7
Charlie Dobson	200 m	Bye		20.21	1 Q	20.34	4
Zharnel Hughes	200 m	Bye		20.19	1 Q	20.07	1st place, gold medalist(s)
Nethaneel Mitchell-Blake	200 m	Bye		20.34	2 Q	20.17	2nd place, silver medalist(s)
Joe Brier	400 m	46.06	5	Did not advance			
Alex Haydock-Wilson	400 m	Bye		45.45	2 Q	45.17	3rd place, bronze medalist(s)
Matthew Hudson-Smith	400 m	Bye		44.98	1 Q	44.53	1st place, gold medalist(s)
Ben Pattison	800 m	1:47.64	2 Q	1:46.95	4 q	1:45.63	6
Daniel Rowden	800 m	1:47.67	3 Q	1:48.80	5	Did not advance	
Jake Wightman	800 m	1:45.94	1 Q	1:46.61	2 Q	1:44.91	2nd place, silver medalist(s)
Neil Gourley	1500 m	3:38.07	4 Q	—N/a		3:38.40	8
Jake Heyward	1500 m	3:39.30	5 q	—N/a		3:34.44	2nd place, silver medalist(s)
Matthew Stonier	1500 m	3:38.37	5 q	—N/a		3:35.97	5
Sam Atkin	5000 m	—N/a				13:32.35	9
Andrew Butchart	5000 m	—N/a				13:31.47	7
Patrick Dever	5000 m	—N/a				13:45.89	21
Sam Atkin	10000 m	—N/a				DNF	–
Emile Cairess	10000 m	—N/a				28:07.37	11
Marc Scott	10000 m	—N/a				28:07.72	12
David King	110 m hurdles	13.63	2 Q	13.73	5	Did not advance	
Miguel Perera	110 m hurdles	13.72	3 Q	13.58	4	Did not advance	
Andrew Pozzi	110 m hurdles	Bye		13.48	3 q	13.66	6
Seamus Derbyshire	400 m hurdles	50.08	3 Q	49.63	4	Did not advance	
Joshua Faulds	400 m hurdles	51.21	5	Did not advance			
Jacob Paul	400 m hurdles	49.40	2 Q	49.48	5	Did not advance	
Jamaine Coleman	3000 m steeplechase	8:39.22	10	—N/a		Did not advance	
Phil Norman	3000 m steeplechase	8:32.00	3 Q	—N/a		8:33.05	9
Zak Seddon	3000 m steeplechase	8:46.74	11	—N/a		Did not advance	
Jeremiah Azu; Zharnel Hughes; Jona Efoloko; Nethaneel Mitchell-Blake (Ran in heat); Harry Aikines-Aryeetey; Tommy Ramdhan	4 × 100 m relay	38.41	1 Q	—N/a		37.67	1st place, gold medalist(s)
Matthew Hudson-Smith; Charlie Dobson; Lewis Davey; Alex Haydock-Wilson (Ran in heat); Joe Brier; Rio Mitcham (Did not run); Ben Higgins; Kevin Metzger	4 × 400 m relay	3:02.36	3 Q	—N/a		2:59.35	1st place, gold medalist(s)
Callum Wilkinson	20 km walk	—N/a				DQ	–
Mohamud Aadan	Marathon	—N/a				2:17.34	30
Luke Caldwell	Marathon	—N/a				DNF	–
Andrew Davies	Marathon	—N/a				2:18.23	35
Andrew Heyes	Marathon	—N/a				2:19.47	44
Philip Sesemann	Marathon	—N/a				2:15.17	17

Field Events

Athlete	Event	Qualification		Final	
Athlete	Event	Distance	Rank	Distance	Rank
Reynold Banigo	Long jump	7.75	9 q	7.66	10
Jacob Fincham-Dukes	Long jump	7.86	5 q	7.97	5
Jack Roach	Long jump	7.35	18	Did not advance	
Ben Williams	Triple jump	16.47	8 q	16.66	6
Joel Clarke-Khan	High jump	2.21	13 q	NM	–
David Smith	High jump	2.17	18	Did not advance	
Harry Coppell	Pole vault	NM	–	Did not advance	
Scott Lincoln	Shot put	20.64	5 q	19.90	10
Lawrence Okoye	Discus throw	62.56	8 q	67.14	3rd place, bronze medalist(s)
Nick Percy	Discus throw	61.26	14	Did not advance	
Nick Miller	Hammer throw	76.09	9 q	77.29	8

=== Women ===
Track & road events

Athlete	Event	Heat		Semifinal		Final	
Athlete	Event	Result	Rank	Result	Rank	Result	Rank
Dina Asher-Smith	100 m	Bye		11.15	1 Q	16.03	8
Imani-Lara Lansiquot	100 m	Bye		11.23	3 q	11.21	5
Daryll Neita	100 m	Bye		10.95	1 Q	11.00	3rd place, bronze medalist(s)
Ashleigh Nelson	100 m	11.41	3 Q	11.47	6	Did not advance	
Dina Asher-Smith	200 m	Bye		22.53	1 Q	22.43	2nd place, silver medalist(s)
Beth Dobbin	200 m	DQ	-	Did not advance			
Daryll Neita	200 m	Bye		DNS	–	Did not advance	
Jodie Williams	200 m	22.92	1 Q	23.03	2 Q	22.85	4
Laviai Nielsen	400 m	51.60	1 Q	51.53	6	Did not advance	
Victoria Ohuruogu	400 m	Bye		50.50	2 Q	50.51	4
Nicole Yeargin	400 m	Bye		52.09	5	Did not advance	
Alex Bell	800 m	2:02.43	2 Q	2:00.53	3 Q	2:00.68	6
Keely Hodgkinson	800 m	2:03.72	1 Q	2:00.67	1 Q	1:59.04	1st place, gold medalist(s)
Jemma Reekie	800 m	2:02.36	1 Q	2:00.30	2 Q	2:00.31	5
Ellie Baker	1500 m	4:04.90	8 q	—N/a		4:05.83	8
Melissa Courtney-Bryant	1500 m	4:09.11	10	—N/a		Did not advance	
Laura Muir	1500 m	4:06.40	1 Q	—N/a		4:01.08	1st place, gold medalist(s)
Katie Snowden	1500 m	4:03.76	5 q	—N/a		4:04.97	4
Amy-Eloise Markovc	5000 m	—N/a				15:08.75	5
Eilish McColgan	5000 m	—N/a				14:59.34	3rd place, bronze medalist(s)
Calli Thackery	5000 m	—N/a				15:08.79	6
Samantha Harrison	10000 m	—N/a				31:46.87	6
Jessica Judd	10000 m	—N/a				32:23.98	10
Eilish McColgan	10000 m	—N/a				30:41.05	2nd place, silver medalist(s)
Jessica Hunter	100 m hurdles	13.27	1 Q	13.43	8	Did not advance	
Cindy Sember	100 m hurdles	Bye		12.62	1 Q	13.16	8
Jessie Knight	400 m hurdles	Bye		55.39	4	Did not advance	
Hayley McLean	400 m hurdles	56.64	3 Q	56.20	5	Did not advance	
Lina Nielsen	400 m hurdles	Bye		57.19	5	Did not advance	
Lizzie Bird	3000 m steeplechase	9:40.05	3 Q	—N/a		9:23.18	3rd place, bronze medalist(s)
Aimee Pratt	3000 m steeplechase	9:39.22	4 Q	—N/a		9:35.31	7
Elise Thorner	3000 m steeplechase	10:08.46	14	—N/a		Did not advance	
Asha Philip; Imani-Lara Lansiquot; Ashleigh Nelson; Dina Asher-Smith (Ran in heat); Bianca Williams	4 × 100 m relay	42.83	1 Q	—N/a		DNF	–
Victoria Ohuruogu; Ama Pipi; Jodie Williams; Nicole Yeargin (Ran in heat); Zoey Clark; Laviai Nielsen (Did not run); Hannah Williams	4 × 400 m relay	3:23.79	1 Q	—N/a		3:21.74	3rd place, bronze medalist(s)
Heather Lewis	20 km walk	—N/a				1:35.36	13
Bethan Davies	35 km walk	—N/a				2:59.38	11
Becky Briggs	Marathon	—N/a				2:39.02	31
Rosie Edwards	Marathon	—N/a				2:40.47	35
Naomi Mitchell	Marathon	—N/a				2:36.44	25
Alice Wright	Marathon	—N/a				2:35.33	22

Field Events

Athlete	Event	Qualification		Final	
Athlete	Event	Distance	Rank	Distance	Rank
Abigail Irozuru	Long jump	6.15	20	Did not advance	
Jazmin Sawyers	Long jump	6.60	6 q	6.80	3rd place, bronze medalist(s)
Jahisha Thomas	Long jump	6.57	10 q	6.37	10
Naomi Metzger	Triple jump	14.24	4 q	14.33	6
Morgan Lake	High jump	1.87	9 q	1.90	7
Laura Zialor	High jump	NM	–	Did not advance	
Molly Caudery	Pole vault	4.50	8 q	4.55	7
Sophie Cook	Pole vault	4.50	9 q	4.40	9
Sophie McKinna	Shot put	17.33	12 q	16.29	12
Divine Oladipo	Shot put	17.16	16	Did not advance	
Amelia Strickler	Shot put	17.20	15	Did not advance	
Jade Lally	Discus throw	57.68	11 q	57.08	9
Kirsty Law	Discus throw	54.83	21	Did not advance	
Jessica Mayho	Hammer throw	63.90	22	Did not advance	
Charlotte Payne	Hammer throw	NM	–	Did not advance	
Anna Purchase	Hammer throw	NM	–	Did not advance	
Bekah Walton	Javelin throw	54.20	19	Did not advance	

Combined events – Heptathlon

Athlete	Event	100H	HJ	SP	200 m	LJ	JT	800 m	Final	Rank
Holly Mills	Result	13.74	1.74	13.23	25.11	5.72	DNS	–	DNF	
Holly Mills	Points	1015	903	743	877	765	–	–	DNF	
Jade O'Dowda	Result	13.72	1.80	12.98	24.80	6.27	41.21	2:12.03	6187	7
Jade O'Dowda	Points	1018	978	726	905	934	691.	935	6187	7

Key

- Q = Qualified for the next round
- q = Qualified for the next round as a fastest loser or, in field events, by position without achieving the qualifying target
- N/A = Round not applicable for the event
- Bye = Athlete not required to compete in round

== Canoe sprint ==
Men

Athlete	Event	Heats		Semifinals		Final	
Athlete	Event	Time	Rank	Time	Rank	Time	Rank
Trevor Thomson	K-1 500 m	1:45.816	8	did not advance			
Lewis Fletcher; Thomas Lusty	K-2 500 m	1:39.708	8	did not advance			
Noah Dembele; Lewis Fletcher; Thomas Lusty; Trevor Thomson	K-4 500 m	1:24.412	7 SF	1:25.934	9	did not advance	
Daniel Johnson	K-1 1000 m	3:37.305	2 SF	3:36.139	2 FA	3:37.839	8
Daniel Johnson; Matthew Johnson	K-2 1000 m	3:21.436	3 F	Bye		3:19.455	6
Matthew Johnson	K-1 5000 m	—N/a				DNF	–
Jonathan Jones; Ben Phillips	C-2 500 m	1:52.953	7 SF	1:46.336	8	did not advance	

Women

Athlete	Event	Heats		Semifinals		Final	
Athlete	Event	Time	Rank	Time	Rank	Time	Rank
Emily Lewis	K-1 500 m	1:58.855	4 SF	1:54.903	4 FB	1:58.632	12
Deborah Kerr; Emma Russell	K-2 500 m	1:50.712	3 SF	1:44.084	2 FA	1:45.172	7
Deborah Kerr; Emily Lewis; Emma Russell; Rebeka Simon	K-4 500 m	1:35.815	2 F	Bye		1:38.592	6
Grace Anderson	K-1 1000 m	4:24.926	8 SF	4:27.215	7	did not advance	
Muriel Johnson	K–1 5000 m	—N/a				KO	14
Katie Reid	C-1 200 m	50.636	4 SF	49.970	4	did not advance	
Isabel Evans; Katie Reid	C-2 200 m	—N/a				46.024	6
Afton Fitzhenry; Beth Gill	C-2 500 m	—N/a				2:04.474	6
Anna Palmer	C-1 5000 m	—N/a				28:14.092	6

Qualification Legend: FA = Qualify to final (medal); FB = Qualify to final B (non-medal)

=== Paracanoeing ===
Athlete	Event	Heats		Semifinal		Final	
Athlete	Event	Time	Rank	Time	Rank	Time	Rank
David Phillipson	Men's KL2	44.074	3 F	Bye		42.698	3rd place, bronze medalist(s)
Jon Tarrant	Men's KL3	—N/a				42.816	5
Jonny Young	Men's KL3	—N/a				42.006	3rd place, bronze medalist(s)
Stewart Clark	Men's VL2	—N/a				59.471	7
Jack Eyers	Men's VL3	48.836	1 F	Bye		47.214	1st place, gold medalist(s)
Martin Tweedie	Men's VL3	54.076	6 SF	50.182	3 F	50.942	7
Jeanette Chippington	Women's KL1	—N/a				56.786	4
Jeanette Chippington	Women's VL2	—N/a				1:01.034	2nd place, silver medalist(s)
Charlotte Henshaw	Women's KL2	—N/a				49.887	2nd place, silver medalist(s)
Charlotte Henshaw	Women's VL3	—N/a				57.020	1st place, gold medalist(s)
Emma Wiggs	Women's KL2	—N/a				47.845	1st place, gold medalist(s)
Emma Wiggs	Women's VL2	—N/a				56.036	1st place, gold medalist(s)
Hope Gordon	Women's KL3	—N/a				48.264	3rd place, bronze medalist(s)
Hope Gordon	Women's VL3	—N/a				57.190	2nd place, silver medalist(s)
Laura Sugar	Women's KL3	—N/a				47.443	1st place, gold medalist(s)

== Cycling ==
=== Track ===
==== Sprint ====
Athlete	Event	Qualification		Round 1		Quarterfinals	Semifinals	Final	
Athlete	Event	Time	Rank	Opposition Time	Rank	Opposition	Opposition	Opposition Time	Rank
Jack Carlin	Men's sprint	9.604	1 Q	Bianchi (ITA); W	—N/a	Szalontay (HUN); W 2–0	Helal (FRA); W 2–0	Vigier (FRA); L 1–2	2nd place, silver medalist(s)
Hamish Turnbull	Men's sprint	9.876	10 Q	Jurczyk (GER); W	—N/a	Rudyk (POL); W 2–0	Vigier (FRA); L 1–2	Helal (FRA); L 0–2	4
Jack Carlin; Alistair Fielding; Hamish Turnbull	Men's team sprint	35.638	2 Q	Spain (ESP); W 35.196	3 FB	—N/a		Poland (POL); W 35.173	3rd place, bronze medalist(s)
Lauren Bell	Women's sprint	10.933	14 Q	van Riessen (NED); L	—N/a	did not advance			
Sophie Capewell	Women's sprint	10.697	7 Q	Degrendele (BEL); W	—N/a	Hinze (GER); L 0–2	did not advance		
Lauren Bell; Sophie Capewell; Emma Finucane	Women's team sprint	38.960	4 Q	DNF^^	–	—N/a		did not advance	

Qualification legend: FA, Gold medal final; FB, Bronze medal final
^^Based on the qualification results, and taking into consideration the short length of the track, it was decided that the teams in the wonen's sprint would compete alone on the track to determine who would compete for the medals based on times.

==== Keirin ====
Athlete	Event	1st Round	Repechage	Semifinals	Final
Athlete	Event	Rank	Rank	Rank	Rank
Hamish Turnbull	Men's keirin	5 R	2 Q	5 FB	8
Lauren Bell	Women's keirin	6 R	4	did not advance	
Sophie Capewell	Women's keirin	4 R	2 Q	3 FA	6

==== Time trial ====
Athlete	Event	Qualification		Final	
Athlete	Event	Time	Rank	Time	Rank
Kian Emadi	Men's time trial	1:01.910	12	did not advance	
Lauren Bell	Women's time trial	34.112	9	did not advance	

==== Omnium ====
Athlete	Event	Qualifying Points Race		Scratch race		Tempo race		Elimination race		Points race		Total	
Athlete	Event	Points	Rank	Rank	Points	Rank	Points	Rank	Points	Rank	Points	Points	Rank
Oliver Wood	Men's omnium	11	2 Q	9	24	6	30	2	38	13	0	92	8
Pfeiffer Georgi	Women's omnium	—N/a		10	22	6	30	3	36	8	36	124	7

==== Pursuit ====
Athlete	Event	Qualification		Semifinals		Final	
Athlete	Event	Time	Rank	Opponent Results	Rank	Opponent Results	Rank
Charlie Tanfield	Men's individual pursuit	4:12.600	3 QB	—N/a		Moro (ITA); L 4:15.503	4
Rhys Britton; Kian Emadi; Charlie Tanfield; Oliver Wood; Will Tidball	Men's team pursuit	3:55.998	4 Q	France (FRA); L 3:55.413	FB	Germany (GER); W 3:54.373	3rd place, bronze medalist(s)
Josie Knight	Women's individual pursuit	3:25.231	4 QB	—N/a		Guazzini (ITA); L 3:27.523	4
Anna Morris	Women's individual pursuit	3:26.307	5	—N/a		did not advance	
Neah Evans; Josie Knight; Anna Morris; Jess Roberts	Women's team pursuit	4:19.800	4 Q	Germany (GER); L 4:18.455	FB	France (FRA); L OVL	4

Qualification legend: FA, Gold medal final; FB, Bronze medal final; OVL, Overlapped

==== Points race ====
Athlete	Event	Qualification		Final	
Athlete	Event	Points	Rank	Points	Rank
Will Tidball	Men's points race	—N/a		–60	18
Neah Evans	Women's points race	—N/a		25	5

==== Scratch race ====
Athlete	Event	Qualification	Final
Rhys Britton	Men's scratch race	—N/a	14
Jess Roberts	Women's scratch race	—N/a	2nd place, silver medalist(s)

==== Elimination race ====
Athlete	Event	Qualification	Final
Will Tidball	Men's elimination race	—N/a	5
Pfeiffer Georgi	Women's elimination race	—N/a	2nd place, silver medalist(s)

==== Madison ====
Athlete	Event	Points	Laps	Rank
Rhys Britton; Will Tidball	Men's madison	DNF		–
Neah Evans; Pfeiffer Georgi	Women's madison	16	20	4

=== BMX ===
Freestyle Park

Athlete	Event	Qualification				Final		
Athlete	Event	Run 1	Run 2	Average	Rank	Run 1	Run 2	Rank
Declan Brooks	Men's freestyle	29.40	DNS	14.70	28	did not advance		
Shaun Gornall	Men's freestyle	84.20	81.40	82.80	2 Q	78.30	30.80	7
Kieran Reilly	Men's freestyle	81.40	82.90	82.15	3 Q	87.20	92.10	2nd place, silver medalist(s)
Sasha Pardoe	Women's freestyle	55.40	62.60	59.00	6 Q	64.60	63.30	6
Charlotte Worthington	Women's freestyle	80.80	83.80	82.30	1 Q	12.80	13.10	8

=== Mountain biking ===
Athlete	Event	Time	Rank
Cameron Orr	Men's cross-country	1:19.08	12
Tom Pidcock	Men's cross-country	1:18.09	1st place, gold medalist(s)
Isla Short	Women's cross-country	–1 Lap	31

== Gymnastics ==
Great Britain has entered five male and five female athletes.

=== Men ===
Team & Individual All-around Finals

Athlete	Event	Team Qualification & Individual All-around Final								Team Final							
Athlete	Event	Apparatus						Total	Rank	Apparatus						Total	Rank
Athlete	Event	F	PH	R	V	PB	HB	Total	Rank	F	PH	R	V	PB	HB	Total	Rank
Joe Fraser	Team	13.633	14.600 Q	14.266	~~14.300~~	15.066 Q	13.700	85.565	1st place, gold medalist(s)	13.700	14.433	14.100	–	15.166	13.900	—N/a	
James Hall	Team	–	13.933	13.533	–	14.133	13.900 Q	55.499	–	–	13.766	13.433	–	14.300	14.066	—N/a	
Jake Jarman	Team	14.466 Q	~~13.033~~	~~12.800~~	14.833	~~14.133~~	13.200	82.465	8	14.500	13.266	–	15.200	–	12.966	—N/a	
Giarnni Regini-Moran	Team	14.266 Q	13.133	–	14.966 Q	14.666 Q	~~9.900~~	66.931	–	14.233	–	–	14.900	13.133	–	—N/a	
Courtney Tulloch	Team	~~12.733~~	–	14.733 Q	14.800 Q	–	–	42.266	–	–	–	14.633	14.600	–	–	—N/a	
Total	Team	42.365	41.666	42.532	44.599	43.865	40.800	255.827	1 Q	42.433	41.465	42.166	44.700	42.599	40.932	254.295	1st place, gold medalist(s)

Individual Apparatus Finals

Athlete	Apparatus	Score	Rank
Jake Jarman	Floor	14.433	3rd place, bronze medalist(s)
Giarnni Regini-Moran	Floor	12.933	7
Joe Fraser	Pommel horse	13.900	8
Courtney Tulloch	Rings	14.866	3rd place, bronze medalist(s)
Jake Jarman^^	Vault	14.983	1st place, gold medalist(s)
Courtney Tulloch	Vault	14.100	7
Joe Fraser	Parallel bars	15.333	1st place, gold medalist(s)
Giarnni Regini-Moran	Parallel bars	14.866	3rd place, bronze medalist(s)
James Hall	Horizontal bar	13.933	4

^^ Giarnni Regini-Moran withdrew from the individual vault final in favour of his teammate Jake Jarman.

=== Women ===
Team & Individual All-around Finals

Athlete	Event	Team Qualification & Individual All-around Final						Team Final					
Athlete	Event	Apparatus				Total	Rank	Apparatus				Total	Rank
Athlete	Event	V	UB	BB	F	Total	Rank	V	UB	BB	F	Total	Rank
Ondine Achampong	Team	13.933	~~12.233~~	13.266 Q	~~12.666~~	52.098	13	13.900	12.433	13.700	-	—N/a	
Georgia-Mae Fenton	Team	–	13.900 Q	–	–	13.900	-	-	13.700	-	-	—N/a	
Jennifer Gadirova	Team	–	–	12.900	13.533 Q	26.433	-	-	-	12.500	13.133	—N/a	
Jessica Gadirova	Team	13.866 Q	12.833	~~12.233~~	13.766 Q	52.698	10	14.000	-	-	13.233	—N/a	
Alice Kinsella	Team	13.600	13.966 Q	13.033	13.533	54.132	2nd place, silver medalist(s)	13.466	14.000	13.733	12.766	—N/a	
Total	Team	41.399	40.699	39.199	40.832	162.129	2 Q	41.366	40.133	39.933	39.132	160.564	2nd place, silver medalist(s)

Individual Apparatus Finals

Athlete	Apparatus	Score	Rank
Jessica Gadirova	Vault	13.433	5
Georgia-Mae Fenton	Uneven bars	13.633	6
Alice Kinsella	Uneven bars	11.666	8
Ondine Achampong	Balance beam	13.400	2nd place, silver medalist(s)
Jennifer Gadirova	Floor	13.466	5
Jessica Gadirova	Floor	14.000	1st place, gold medalist(s)

== Rowing ==
Men

Athlete	Event	Heats		Repechage		Semifinals		Final	
Athlete	Event	Time	Rank	Time	Rank	Time	Rank	Time	Rank
Graeme Thomas	Single sculls	8:17.09	2 SA/B	—N/a		7:12.80	1 FA	7:25.32	5
Harry Leask; George Bourne; Matthew Haywood; Tom Barras	Quadruple sculls	6:22.99	2 SA/B	—N/a		6:15.77	3 FA	6:11.04	4
Oliver Wynne-Griffith; Tom George	Coxless pair	7:02.55	1 SA/B	—N/a		6:55.85	1 FA	6:46.52	2nd place, silver medalist(s)
William Stewart; Sam Nunn; Matthew Aldridge; Freddie Davidson	Coxless four	6:32.26	1 FA	—N/a				6:15.43	1st place, gold medalist(s)
Rory Gibbs; Morgan Bolding; David Bewicke-Copley; Sholto Carnegie; Charles Elwes; Thomas Digby; James Rudkin; Tom Ford; Harry Brightmore (cox)	Eight	5:59.29	1 FA	—N/a				5:49.67	1st place, gold medalist(s)
Dale Flockhart; Jamie Copus	Lightweight double sculls	7:18.52	4 R	6:58.07	3 FB	—N/a		6:55.55	7
Benjamin Pritchard	PR1 single sculls	10:13.44	2 R	10:33.93	1 FA	—N/a		9:53.75	3rd place, bronze medalist(s)

Women

Athlete	Event	Heats		Repechage		Semifinals		Final	
Athlete	Event	Time	Rank	Time	Rank	Time	Rank	Time	Rank
Kyra Edwards; Saskia Budgett	Double sculls	7:39.49	2 SA/B	—N/a		7:24.36	3 FA	7:33.40	5
Jessica Leyden; Lola Anderson; Georgina Megan Brayshaw; Lucy Glover	Quadruple sculls	7:09.73	1 FA	—N/a				6:49.21	1st place, gold medalist(s)
Emily Ford; Esme Booth	Coxless pair	7:44.93	1 FA	—N/a				7:36.20	2nd place, silver medalist(s)
Heidi Long; Rowan McKellar; Samantha Redgrave; Rebecca Shorten	Coxless four	7:11.95	1 FA	—N/a				6:50.92	1st place, gold medalist(s)
Rebecca Edwards; Lauren Irwin; Emily Ford; Esme Booth; Samantha Redgrave; Rebecca Shorten; Rowan McKellar; Heidi Long; Morgan Baynham-Williams (cox)	Eight	6:43.52	2 FA	—N/a				6:28.02	2nd place, silver medalist(s)
Maddie Arlett	Lightweight single sculls	8:51.26	5 R	DNS		—N/a		did not advance	
Emily Craig; Imogen Grant	Lightweight double sculls	7:42.44	1 FA	—N/a				7:27.82	1st place, gold medalist(s)

Mixed

Athlete	Event	Heats		Final	
Athlete	Event	Time	Rank	Time	Rank
Francesca Allen; Giedrė Rakauskaitė; Edward Fuller; Oliver Stanhope; Erin Kennedy (cox)	PR3 coxed four	7:23.21	1 FA	7:06.73	1st place, gold medalist(s)

== Sport climbing ==
Boulder

Athlete	Event	Qualification		Semifinal		Final	
Athlete	Event	Result	Rank	Result	Rank	Result	Rank
Hamish McArthur	Men's boulder	3T 4z 7 6	9 Q	0T 2z 0 10	18	did not advance	
Maximillian Milne	Men's boulder	2T 5z 9 11	25	did not advance			
Nathan Phillips	Men's boulder	2T 3z 6 12	35	did not advance			
James Pope	Men's boulder	2T 3z 3 3	17 Q	0T 2z 0 6	14	did not advance	
Toby Roberts	Men's boulder	2T 4z 8 6	31	did not advance			
Erin McNeice	Women's boulder	0T 3z 0 7	31	did not advance			
Emily Phillips	Women's boulder	0T 4z 0 11	29	did not advance			
Molly Thompson-Smith	Women's boulder	0T 2z 0 5	44	did not advance			
Holly Toothill	Women's boulder	1T 2z 3 6	25	did not advance			

Lead

Athlete	Event	Qualification		Semifinal		Final		
Athlete	Event	Score	Rank	Score	Rank	Hold	Time	Rank
Hamish McArthur	Men's lead	7.25	8 Q	DNS		did not advance		
Maximillian Milne	Men's lead	23.98	27	did not advance				
James Pope	Men's lead	19.44	18 Q	21	24	did not advance		
Toby Roberts	Men's lead	13.19	12 Q	36	13	did not advance		
Thea Cameron	Women's lead	39.95	42	did not advance				
Erin McNeice	Women's lead	31.82	36	did not advance				
Joanna Neame	Women's lead	43.25	44	did not advance				
Molly Thompson-Smith	Women's lead	16.31	17 Q	24	13	did not advance		
Jennifer Wood	Women's lead	39.50	41	did not advance				

Speed

Athlete	Event	Qualification		Round of 16	Quarterfinal	Semifinal	Final	
Athlete	Event	Time	Rank	Opposition Time	Opposition Time	Opposition Time	Opposition Time	Rank
Matthew Fall	Men's	6.587	18	did not advance				

== Table tennis ==
The following five competitors were listed as representing England.

Men

- Tom Jarvis
- Liam Pitchford
- Sam Walker

Women

- Charlotte Bardsley
- Tin-Tin Ho

Singles

Athletes	Event	Group stage			Round of 64	Round of 32	Round of 16	Quarterfinal	Semifinal	Final / BM	
Athletes	Event	Opposition Score	Opposition Score	Rank	Opposition Score	Opposition Score	Opposition Score	Opposition Score	Opposition Score	Opposition Score	Rank
Tom Jarvis	Men's singles	Putuntica (MDA); W 3–2	Glod (LUX); W 3–0	1 Q	Jancarik (CZE); L 3–4	did not advance					
Liam Pitchford	Men's singles	Bye			Polansky (CZE); W 4–1	Apolónia (POR); L 2–4	did not advance				
Sam Walker	Men's singles	Jevtovic (SRB); W 3–1	Yiğenler (TUR); W 3–0	1 Q	Persson (SWE); L 2–4	did not advance					
Charlotte Bardsley	Women's singles	Arlia (ITA); W 3–2	Hanson (EST); W 3–0	1 Q	Shao (POR); L 0–4	did not advance					
Tin-Tin Ho	Women's singles	De Loop (NED); W 3–0	Wegrzyn (POL); W 3–0	1 Q	De Nutte (LUX); W 4–3	Polcanova (AUT); L 1–4	did not advance				

Doubles

Athletes	Event	Preliminary Round 1	Preliminary Round 2	Round of 32	Round of 16	Quarterfinal	Semifinal	Final / BM	
Athletes	Event	Opposition Score	Opposition Score	Opposition Score	Opposition Score	Opposition Score	Opposition Score	Opposition Score	Rank
Tom Jarvis; Sam Walker	Men's doubles	Bye		Andersen & Rasmussen (DEN); L 0–3	did not advance				
Liam Pitchford; Jonathan Groth (DEN)	Men's doubles	Bye	Karabaxhak (KOS) & Mladenovski (MKD); W 3–0	Karakašević (SRB) & Pištej (SVK); L 2–3	did not advance				
Tin-Tin Ho; Karoline Mischek (AUT)	Women's doubles	Bye		Brateyko (UKR) & Malobabic (CRO); W 3–2	Matelova (CZE) & Balazova (SVK); L 0–3	did not advance			
Tom Jarvis; Charlotte Bardsley	Mixed doubles	Bye	Konstantinopoulos & Toliou (GRE); W 3–0	Gardos & Polcanova (AUT); L 1–3	did not advance				
Liam Pitchford; Tin-Tin Ho	Mixed doubles	Bye		Kulczycki & Wegrzyn (POL); L 2–3	did not advance				

== Triathlon ==
=== Men ===
Athlete	Event	Swim (1.5 km)	Trans 1	Bike (40 km)	Trans 2	Run (10 km)	Total Time	Rank
Daniel Dixon	Men's	18.38	0.36	51.12	0.26	38.20	1:49.10	48
Harry Leleu	Men's	18.15	0.36	51.34	0.26	34.13	1:45.01	29
Barclay Izzard	Men's	19.01	0.32	53.39	0.22	31.36	1:45.08	30
Grant Sheldon	Men's	18.29	0.36	51.20	0.26	32.13	1:43.04	15
Jack Willis	Men's	18.15	0.36	51.29	0.26	33.35	1:44.20	24

=== Women ===
Athlete	Event	Swim (1.5 km)	Trans 1	Bike (40 km)	Trans 2	Run (10 km)	Total Time	Rank
Sophie Alden	Women's	19.21	0.36	DNF				–
Iona Miller	Women's	19.43	0.36	1:00.04	0.30	40.01	2:00.53	36
Issy Morris	Women's	20.17	0.37	59.27	0.27	37.21	1:58.08	27
Non Stanford	Women's	19.27	0.35	57.19	0.27	34.24	1:52.10	1st place, gold medalist(s)

=== Mixed ===
Athlete	Event	Swim (300 m)	Trans 1	Bike (6.8 km)	Trans 2	Run (2 km)	Total Group Time	Rank
Hamish Reilly	Mixed relay	3.42	0.43	11.11	0.24	4.51	20.51	—N/a
Iona Miller	Mixed relay	4.04	0.47	12.45	0.29	5.30	23.35	—N/a
Ben Dijkstra	Mixed relay	3.48	0.45	11.16	0.23	4.38	20.50	—N/a
Non Stanford	Mixed relay	4.07	0.48	12.43	0.30	5.50	23.58	—N/a
Total	Mixed relay	—N/a					1:29.14	12
