= Inger Kavlie =

Norwegian rower (born 1993)

Inger Seim Kavlie
Personal information
- Nationality: Norwegian
- Born: 8 September 1993 (age 32)
- Home town: Oslo, Norway
- Height: 177 cm (5 ft 10 in)
- Weight: 80 kg (176 lb)

Sport
- Sport: Rowing
- Club: Christiania RK
Medal record
Women's rowing
Representing Norway
European Championships
Gold medal – first place	2024 Szeged	Double sculls

Inger Seim Kavlie (born 8 September 1993) is a Norwegian competitive rower. Her achievements include winning a gold medal in double scull at the 2024 European Rowing Championships, and winning the overall double scull World Rowing Cup for 2024.

== Career ==
Kavlie won a gold medal in double scull at the 2024 European Rowing Championships, along with Thea Helseth. In May 2024 she was selected rower of the month by the World Rowing Federation. Along with Helseth she won the double scull overall World Rowing Cup in the 2024 season.

She was selected to compete in double sculls at the 2024 Summer Olympics, along with Helseth, the duo managed to qualify for the final, where they placed sixth.
