= Peter Jones (rugby, born 1942) =

Australia international rugby union & league footballer

Personal information
- Full name: Peter Anthony Jones
- Born: 15 August 1942 (age 84) Gundagai, New South Wales, Australia

Playing information

Rugby union
Club
| Years | Team | Pld | T | G | FG | P |
|---|---|---|---|---|---|---|
| 196?–63 | Randwick DRUFC |
Representative
| Years | Team | Pld | T | G | FG | P |
| 1963–63 | Australia | 2 | 1 | 0 | 0 | 3 |

Rugby league
- Position: Five-eighth
Club
| Years | Team | Pld | T | G | FG | P |
|---|---|---|---|---|---|---|
| 1964–70 | Balmain | 74 | 10 | 0 | 0 | 30 |
Representative
| Years | Team | Pld | T | G | FG | P |
| 1965 | New South Wales | 2 | 1 | 0 | 0 | 3 |
| 1966 | NSW City | 1 | 0 | 0 | 0 | 0 |
- Source: As of 2 May 2019

Peter Jones is an Australian former rugby league footballer who played in the 1950s and 1960s. He played for Balmain in the New South Wales Rugby League (NSWRL) competition.

== Background ==
Jones played rugby union for Randwick DRUFC before being selected to play for Australia against England in 1963. Jones then toured South Africa with the Australian side. Soon after this, Jones switched codes to play rugby league for Balmain.

== Playing career ==
Jones made his first grade debut for Balmain in 1964. In 1965, Jones was selected for New South Wales and featured in 2 games against Queensland scoring a try in one of the matches. In 1966, Balmain finished second on the table and reached the grand final against St George. Jones played at five-eighth for Balmain who were comprehensively beaten in the final 23-4 which was played at the Sydney Cricket Ground in front of 61,000 people. The grand final victory for St George was their 11th consecutive premiership victory.

In 1969, Jones chose to sit out the entire season because of the way player transfer payments were handled by the NSWRL board. Two other players who played for Balmain Dennis Tutty and Laurie Moraschi also sat out the season in protest. Balmain would then go on to win the 1969 grand final against South Sydney in a massive upset. The premiership victory was the club's 11th and last as a stand-alone entity before merging with Western Suburbs at the end of 1999. Jones returned the following season in 1970 for one last season before retiring.
