= Robin Gourley =

Australian rugby league footballer (1935–2021)

Personal information
- Full name: Robin Edward Atchison Gourley
- Born: 19 November 1935 County Tyrone, Northern Ireland
- Died: 19 July 2021 (aged 85)

Playing information
Club
Years	Team	Pld	T	G	FG	P
1962	Wagga
1963–66	St George	37	7	0	0	21
1967	Narrabri
	Total	37	7	0	0	21
Representative
Years	Team	Pld	T	G	FG	P
1962	New South Wales	1	0	0	0	0
1967	Country New South Wales	2	0	0	0	0
- Source: Whiticker/Hudson
- Relatives: Scott Gourley (son); Laura Gourley (granddaughter)

Robin Edward Gourley (19 November 1935 – 19 July 2021) was a Northern Irish-Australian professional rugby league and rugby union footballer who played in the 1950s and 1960s. A New South Wales representative front row forward, he played in the NSWRFL Premiership for Sydney club St George with which he won the 1965 and 1966 grand finals.

== Early career ==
Gourley was born in County Tyrone, Northern Ireland, on 19 November 1935. After initially playing rugby union in his native country, he moved to Australia in 1958 when he was 23 years of age, taking up rugby league football.

While living and playing in Wagga Wagga, New South Wales, Gourley was selected to play for the New South Wales rugby league team. This brought him to the attention of Frank Facer, administrator for Sydney club St George, who signed Gourley to the premiers for the following season.

== St. George Dragons career ==
Gourley temporarily ended his career as a farmer and moved to Sydney, where he played from 1963 to 1966 as a front-row forward for St George, including the team's grand final wins in 1965 and 1966. He also won a Reserve Grade premiership with St. George in his first year in grade in 1963.

Gourley returned to country farmer and while playing for his local Narrabri, New South Wales, rugby league club in 1967 he also represented the Country New South Wales team.

Gourley is the father of fellow past Dragon, Scott Gourley and the grandfather of Australian representative rower Laura Gourley.
