= Kyra Edwards =

British rower

Personal information
- Born: 12 August 1997 (age 28) Nottingham, England
- Education: University of California, Los Angeles

Sport
- Country: United Kingdom
- Sport: Rowing
- College team: University of California, Los Angeles
Medal record
Rowing
Representing Great Britain
World Rowing U23 Championships
Bronze medal – third place	2018 Poznan	Women's Quadruple Sculls

Kyra Edwards (born 12 August 1997) is a British sculler.

She holds a degree in statistics from the University of California, Los Angeles. Edwards is outspoken about being a role model for black and LGBTQ athletes and advocates for improved diversity in rowing. She has criticized British Rowing's recruiting system and the high cost of equipment and coaching for contributing to limited inclusion of ethnic minorities. She is in a relationship with Saskia Budgett, another British rower. Edwards and Budgett competed together at the 2022 European Championships and 2022 World Rowing Championship.
