= Saskia Budgett =

British rower

Personal information
- Born: 21 September 1996 (age 29)

Sport
- Club: Tideway Scullers School
Medal record
Women's rowing
Representing Great Britain
European Championships
Bronze medal – third place	2021 Varese	Double sculls

Saskia Budgett (born 21 September 1996) is a British rower. In 2021, she won a European bronze medal (with Holly Nixon) in the double sculls in Varese, Italy. She has been selected as a reserve for the 2020 Summer Olympics. She is openly lesbian and is in a relationship with Kyra Edwards, also a British rower. Budgett and Edwards competed together at the 2022 European Championships and 2022 World Rowing Championship.
