= Dave Cooper (rugby league) =

Australian rugby league footballer

Personal information
- Full name: Dave Cooper
- Born: Sydney, New South Wales, Australia

Playing information
- Position: Second-row, Prop
Club
Years	Team	Pld	T	G	FG	P
1962–66	Balmain	40	0	0	0	0
1967–72	Cronulla-Sutherland	56	13	0	0	39
1973	North Sydney	18	2	0	0	6
	Total	114	15	0	0	45

Dave Cooper is an Australian former professional rugby league footballer who played in the 1960s and 1970s. He played for the Balmain Tigers, Cronulla-Sutherland Sharks and the North Sydney Bears in the NSWRL Competition. He was an inaugural player for Cronulla and played in the club's first ever game.

== Playing career ==
Cooper began his first grade career for Balmain in 1962. Cooper played 5 seasons for the club. He did not feature in the 1964 grand final loss against St George but played in the second half of the 1966 grand final loss also against St George.

In 1967, Cooper joined newly admitted side Cronulla and played in the club's first ever game, an 11-5 victory over Eastern Suburbs at Sydney Sports Ground. Cronulla went on to finish last in their inaugural season winning only 2 more games. Cooper stayed with Cronulla until the end of 1972, in that time Cronulla continued to struggle in the NSWRL competition and finished last a second time in 1969.

The year after Cooper departed the club, Cronulla went on to make their first ever grand final against Manly. In 1973, Cooper joined North Sydney and played one season for the club before retiring.

After retiring, he started The Athlete’s Foot shoe stores in Australia.
