= Laura Gourley =

Australian rower (born 2002)

Personal information
- Born: 28 May 2002 (age 23); Narrabri, New South Wales, Australia
- Height: 178 cm (5 ft 10 in)

Sport
- Country: Australia
- Sport: Rowing
- Club: UTS Haberfield Rowing Club
- Coached by: Tom Westgarth

Laura Gourley (born 28 May 2002) is an Australian representative rower. She is a three-time Australian underage champion, has represented at U23 World Championships and in 2023 made the Australian senior squad.

== Club and state rowing ==
Gourley, who is from Narrabri in north-western NSW, attended school at Loreto Normanhurst where she took up rowing. Her senior club rowing has been from the UTS Haberfield Rowing Club in Sydney.

Gourley first made NSW state selection in the 2020 women's youth eight, which didn't race at the Interstate Regatta due to the pandemic. In 2021, she was again selected in the NSW women's youth eight, placing 3rd in the race for the Bicentennial Cup at the Interstate Regatta within the Australian Rowing Championships.

She made senior state selection for New South Wales in 2022 when picked in the senior women's eight to contest the Queen's Cup at the Interstate Regatta (2nd place). She rowed again in the NSW Queen's Cup eight of 2023 again to 2nd place.

In UTS Haberfield colours Gourley won the U21 women's single scull title at the Australian Rowing Championships in 2021. In 2022 and 2023 she won the U23 single scull Australian championship titles.

== International representative rowing ==
Gourley's Australian representative debut came in 2022 when she was selected as Australia's U23 single sculler to compete at the 2022 U23 World Rowing Championships in Varese where she finished in 8th place.

In March 2023 Gourley was selected in the Australian senior women's sculling squad for the 2023 international season. At the Rowing World Cup II in Varese, Italy Gourley raced as Australia's W2X entrant with Amanda Bateman. They made the A final and finished in fourth place. At 2023's WRC III in Lucerne, Gourley and Bateman again raced the W2X. They made the A final and in a tight finish at the back of that field they finished in fourth place. Gourley and Bateman were selected to race Australia's double scull at 2023 World Rowing Championships in Belgrade, Serbia. They placed third in their heat but then won their repechage to qualify through to the A/B semi in which they finished fifth. In the B final they finished 2nd, earnt a 7th place world ranking from the regatta and qualified the boat for Paris 2024.

== Sporting family ==
Laura is the granddaughter of Northern Irish-Australian professional rugby league and rugby union footballer Robin Gourley who played in the 1950s and 1960s and won two premierships with the St George Dragons. Laura is the niece of dual-code rugby international, Scott Gourley. Her father Ian is Robin's son, Scott's brother.
