= Sophia Vitas =

American rower (born 1992)

Personal information
- Born: December 22, 1992 (age 33) Franklin, Wisconsin, U.S.

Sport
- Country: United States
- Sport: Rowing
Medal record
World Championships
Bronze medal – third place	2023 Belgrade	Double sculls
Bronze medal – third place	2026 Amsterdam	Quadruple sculls
Bronze medal – third place	2026 Amsterdam	Mixed double sculls

Sophia Vitas (born 22 December 1992) is an American rower. She competed at the 2024 Paris Olympics in the double sculls.

== Early life ==
She is from Franklin, Wisconsin, born to Kelly and Mark Vitas. She attended Franklin High School. She was a basketball player at the University of Milwaukee and only took up rowing after she transferred to the University of Wisconsin.

== Career ==
She won a bronze medal at the 2023 World Rowing Championships in Belgrade, alongside Kristina Wagner in the double sculls.

They won their first international event as a pair at the Rowing World Cup in Lucerne in May 2024. She was selected for the double sculls alongside Wagner for the 2024 Summer Olympics.
