= Laurie Moraschi =

Australian rugby league footballer

Personal information
- Full name: Laurie Moraschi
- Born: 22 December 1942; Ingham, Queensland, Australia
- Died: 12 August 2018 (aged 75); Sydney, New South Wales, Australia

Playing information
- Position: Fullback, Centre
Club
Years	Team	Pld	T	G	FG	P
1966–68	Balmain	34	1	0	0	3
1970–72	North Sydney	38	7	0	0	21
	Total	72	8	0	0	24
Representative
Years	Team	Pld	T	G	FG	P
1965	New South Wales	1	1	0	0	3
1965	NSW Country	1	0	0	0	0

Laurie Moraschi (/ˈmɔːræskɪ/;) (1942-2018) was an Australian rugby league footballer who played in the 1960s and 1970s. He played in the NSWRFL premiership for North Sydney and Balmain.

== Early life ==
Moraschi was born in Ingham, Queensland but moved to Sydney and then Griffith at a young age. Moraschi played his junior rugby league with Griffith and starred in the local competition winning the NSW Country Player of the Year Award in 1965. In the same year, Moraschi also represented New South Wales and Country New South Wales before gaining the attention of Balmain and signed with them in 1966.

== Playing career ==
Moraschi made his debut for Balmain in the 1966 season and in the same year was a member of the clubs losing grand final side against St George. Moraschi played a total of 34 games for Balmain but chose to sit out the entire 1969 season because of the way player transfer payments were handled by the NSWRL board. Two other players who played for Balmain Dennis Tutty and Peter Jones also sat out the season. In the same year, Balmain went on to win their 11th and final premiership as a club when they upset Souths in the grand final.

In 1970, Moraschi chose to return to play rugby league and joined North Sydney. Moraschi spent 3 years at the club before retiring in 1972.
