= Thea Helseth =

Norwegian rower (born 1996)

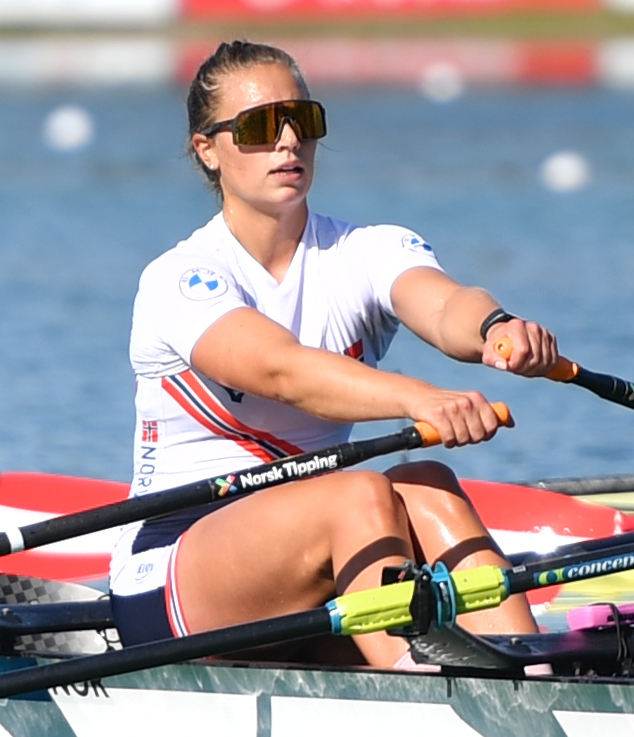

Personal information
- Born: 10 June 1996 (age 30) Ålesund, Norway

Sport
- Sport: Rowing
- Club: Aalesund Roklub
Medal record
Women's rowing
Representing Norway
European Championships
Gold medal – first place	2024 Szeged	Double sculls

Thea Helseth (born 10 June 1996) is a Norwegian competitive rower. Her achievements include winning several national titles, and a gold medal in double scull at the 2024 European Rowing Championships.

== Personal life ==
Helseth was born in Ålesund on 10 June 1996. She is a sister of Olympic rower Martin Helseth.

== Career ==
Helseth has won several national titles in single scull, in 2016, 2017, 2018 and 2021.

She won a gold medal in double scull at the 2024 European Rowing Championships, along with Inger Kavlie. Along with Kavlie she won the double scull overall World Rowing Cup in the 2024 season.

She qualified and was selected to compete at the 2024 Summer Olympics. Along with inger Kavlie, she placed sixth in double sculls at the Olympics.
