= Zoe Hyde =

Irish rower (born 1997)

Personal information
- Nationality: Irish
- Born: 31 January 1997 (age 29) Ireland
- Home town: Killorglin, County Kerry, Ireland

Sport
- Country: Ireland
- Sport: Rowing
- Event: Double sculls
- Club: Tralee Rowing Club
Medal record
Women's rowing
Representing Ireland
World Championships
Gold medal – first place	2026 Amsterdam	Double sculls
Bronze medal – third place	2022 Račice	Double sculls

Zoe Hyde (born 31 January 1997) is an Irish rower. She was a gold medalist at the 2026 World Rowing Championships in 2026 in the double sculls having previously won the bronze medal at the 2022 World Championships and represented Ireland at the 2024 Paris Olympics.

== Career ==
From Killorglin in County Kerry, Hyde started rowing when she was 13 years-old.

Competing alongside Sanita Pušpure, Hyde won the bronze medal at the World Rowing Championships in 2022 in the double sculls. Alongside Alison Bergin she was a heat winner at the 2023 World Rowing Championships, before placing fourth overall in the double sculls.

Hyde was selected for the 2024 Paris Olympics with Bergin for the double sculls. She teamed up with Margaret Cremen for the double sculls at the 2025 European Rowing Championships in Plovdiv, placing fourth overall.

In May 2026, Hyde and Margaret Cremen won the medal bronze in the Women's Double Sculls at the 2026 Rowing World Cup I event in Seville, Spain. Alongside Cremen, she won the gold medal at the 2026 World Rowing Championships in Amsterdam in August, in the women's double sculls.
