= Ron Saddler =

Australian RL coach and Australia international rugby league footballer

Personal information
- Full name: Ronald William Saddler
- Born: 14 March 1942 Lake Cargelligo, New South Wales, Australia
- Died: 12 May 2016 (aged 74)

Playing information
- Position: Centre
Club
Years	Team	Pld	T	G	FG	P
1963–71	Eastern Suburbs		22	13	0	92
Representative
Years	Team	Pld	T	G	FG	P
1967–68	New South Wales	6	2	5	0	16
1967–68	Australia
1969	NSW City Firsts	1	0	0	0	0

Coaching information
Representative
Years	Team	Gms	W	D	L	W%
1967	New South Wales	1	1	0	0	100
- As of 13 April 2021

Ronald William Saddler was an Australian rugby league footballer who played in the 1960s and 1970s. A New South Wales and Australian international representative three-quarter back, he played in Sydney's NSWRFL Premiership for the Eastern Suburbs club.

Originally from Euabalong, New South Wales, and of Wiradjuri descent, Ron first played rugby league for Tweed Heads. Saddler also played for the Sydney club Eastern Suburbs from 1963 to 1964 and 1966–71.

An Aboriginal centre, Saddler was selected for the 1967/68 Kangaroo Tour, playing in 12 matches, but no tests. Saddler has been allocated Eastern Suburbs player number 529.

He was the first indigenous player to captain New South Wales, six years before Arthur Beetson.

Ron Saddler's former Sydney Roosters teammate Kevin Junee, another 1967–68 Kangaroo, said "Saddler got the nod as the Blues' captain in 1967 because he was respected by teammates and opponents alike".

Upon his retirement from Sydney, he captain-coached Murwillumbah Brothers for a number of years in the 1970s. He resided in the Murwillumbah Area until his death in May 2016.

== Sources ==
- Whiticker, Alan & Hudson, Glen (2006) The Encyclopedia of Rugby League Players, Gavin Allen Publishing, Sydney

Sporting positions
Preceded by Reg Gasnier; 1967	Coach New South Wales; 1967	Succeeded by Harry Bath; 1968–1972
