= Ken Ashcroft =

Australian rugby league footballer (born 1938)

Personal information
- Born: 25 April 1938 (age 86); Sydney, New South Wales, Australia

Playing information
- Position: hooker
Club
Years	Team	Pld	T	G	FG	P
1957–67	Eastern Suburbs	146	5	0	0	15

Ken Ashcroft is an Australian former rugby league footballer who played in the 1950s and 1960s. He played in Australia's major competition – the New South Wales Rugby League (NSWRL) premiership.

Ashcroft, a hooker, played 151 matches for Eastern Suburbs during the years (1957–67) his 11 seasons at the club. Ashcroft was a member of the Eastern Suburbs side that was beaten by the St George Dragons in the 1960 premiership decider.

== Sources ==
- Whiticker, Alan & Hudson, Glen (2006) The Encyclopedia of Rugby League Players, Gavin Allen Publishing, Sydney
