= Kristi Wagner =

American rower (born 1993)

Kristina Wagner
Personal information
- Born: January 25, 1993 (age 33) Boston, Massachusetts, U.S.
- Height: 1.83 m (6 ft 0 in)

Sport
- Country: United States
- Sport: Rowing
Medal record
World Championships
Bronze medal – third place	2023 Belgrade	Double sculls
Bronze medal – third place	2026 Amsterdam	Quadruple sculls

Kristina Wagner (born January 25, 1993) is an American rower. She competed in the 2020 Summer Olympics and 2024 Summer Olympics.
