= Shen Shuangmei =

Chinese rower

Personal information
- Nationality: China
- Born: 2 May 1998 (age 28)

Sport
- Sport: Rowing
Medal record
Women's rowing
Representing China
Asian Games
Gold medal – first place	2022 Hangzhou	Double sculls
Gold medal – first place	2026 Aichi–Nagoya	Double sculls

Shen Shuangmei (born 2 May 1998) is a Chinese rower. She competed in the 2020 Summer Olympics.
