= List of flag bearers for Togo at the Olympics =

Togo at the Olympics
- IOC code: TOG
- NOC: Comité National Olympique Togolais
- Medals: Gold 0 Silver 0 Bronze 1 Total 1

Summer appearances
- 1972; 1976–1980; 1984; 1988; 1992; 1996; 2000; 2004; 2008; 2012; 2016; 2020; 2024

Winter appearances
- 2014; 2018; 2022; 2026

This is a list of flag bearers who have represented Togo at the Olympics.

Flag bearers carry the national flag of their country at the opening ceremony of the Olympic Games.

| # | Event year | Season | Flag bearer | Sport |
|---|---|---|---|---|
| 1 | 1972 | Summer | Roger Kangni | Cycling |
| 2 | 1984 | Summer | Denou Koffi | Athletics |
| 3 | 1988 | Summer | Akossi Gnalo | Athletics |
| 4 | 1996 | Summer | Téko Folligan | Athletics |
| 5 | 2000 | Summer | Kouami Sacha Denanyoh | Judo |
| 6 | 2004 | Summer | Jan Sekpona | Athletics |
| 7 | 2008 | Summer | Benjamin Boukpeti | Canoe slalom |
| 8 | 2012 | Summer | Benjamin Boukpeti | Canoe slalom |
| 9 | 2014 | Winter | Mathilde-Amivi Petitjean | Cross-country skiing |
| 10 | 2016 | Summer | Adzo Kpossi | Swimming |
| 11 | 2018 | Winter | Mathilde-Amivi Petitjean | Cross-country skiing |
| 12 | 2020 | Summer | Claire Ayivon | Rowing |
| 12 | 2020 | Summer | Dodji Fanny | Table tennis |
| 13 | 2024 | Summer | Eloi Adjavon | Triathlon |
| 13 | 2024 | Summer | Naomi Akakpo | Athletics |

== See also ==
- Togo at the Olympics
