= 2017 World Rowing Championships – Women's single sculls =

Women's single sculls at the 2017 World Rowing Championships
- Venue: Nathan Benderson Park
- Location: Sarasota, United States
- Dates: 25 September – 1 October
- Competitors: 22 from 22 nations
- Winning time: 7:22.58

Medalists
gold medal	Jeannine Gmelin	Switzerland
silver medal	Victoria Thornley	Great Britain
bronze medal	Magdalena Lobnig	Austria

The women's single sculls competition at the 2017 World Rowing Championships in Sarasota took place in Nathan Benderson Park.

== Schedule ==
The schedule was as follows:

Date	Time	Round
Monday 25 September 2017	12:11	Heats
Wednesday 27 September 2017	11:50	Repechages
Thursday 28 September 2017	09:50	Semifinals C/D
Friday 29 September 2017	11:13	Semifinals A/B
Friday 29 September 2017	13:45	Final D
Friday 29 September 2017	14:25	Final C
Sunday 1 October 2017	09:20	Final B
Sunday 1 October 2017	10:57	Final A

All times are Eastern Daylight Time (UTC-4)

== Results ==
=== Heats ===
Heat winners advanced directly to the A/B semifinals. The remaining boats were sent to the repechages.

==== Heat 1 ====
Rank	Rower	Country	Time	Notes
1	Fie Udby Erichsen	Denmark	7:30.00	SA/B
2	Carling Zeeman	Canada	7:30.03	R
3	Annekatrin Thiele	Germany	7:42.89	R
4	Virginia Diaz	Spain	7:46.84	R
5	Olha Hurkovska	Ukraine	8:10.32	R
6	Alejandra Alonso	Paraguay	8:24.80	R

==== Heat 2 ====
Rank	Rower	Country	Time	Notes
1	Victoria Thornley	Great Britain	7:30.09	SA/B
2	Lisa Scheenaard	Netherlands	7:33.10	R
3	Felice Mueller	United States	7:35.33	R
4	Lucie Žabová	Czech Republic	7:48.06	R
5	Eeva Karppinen	Finland	7:55.49	R
6	Kim Ye-ji	South Korea	8:03.37	R

==== Heat 3 ====
Rank	Rower	Country	Time	Notes
1	Magdalena Lobnig	Austria	7:36.43	SA/B
2	Duan Jingli	China	7:49.70	R
3	Marianne Madsen	Norway	7:52.70	R
4	Felice Chow	Trinidad and Tobago	7:59.62	R
5	Sarah Fraincart	Morocco	8:42.85	R

==== Heat 4 ====
Rank	Rower	Country	Time	Notes
1	Jeannine Gmelin	Switzerland	7:26.22	SA/B
2	Sanita Pušpure	Ireland	7:27.11	R
3	Hannah Osborne	New Zealand	7:47.33	R
4	Elza Gulbe	Latvia	8:11.56	R
5	Emily Morley	Bahamas	8:38.57	R

=== Repechages ===
The two fastest boats in each repechage advanced to the A/B semifinals. The remaining boats were sent to the C/D semifinals.

==== Repechage 1 ====
Rank	Rower	Country	Time	Notes
1	Sanita Pušpure	Ireland	7:36.16	SA/B
2	Lucie Žabová	Czech Republic	7:45.98	SA/B
3	Marianne Madsen	Norway	7:56.03	SC/D
4	Olha Hurkovska	Ukraine	8:03.98	SC/D

==== Repechage 2 ====
Rank	Rower	Country	Time	Notes
1	Felice Mueller	United States	7:34.48	SA/B
2	Virginia Diaz	Spain	7:48.22	SA/B
3	Duan Jingli	China	7:57.77	SC/D
4	Emily Morley	Bahamas	8:33.01	SC/D

==== Repechage 3 ====
Rank	Rower	Country	Time	Notes
1	Lisa Scheenaard	Netherlands	7:35.68	SA/B
2	Annekatrin Thiele	Germany	7:39.35	SA/B
3	Elza Gulbe	Latvia	7:57.06	SC/D
4	Kim Ye-ji	South Korea	8:07.40	SC/D
5	Sarah Fraincart	Morocco	8:52.33	SC/D

==== Repechage 4 ====
Rank	Rower	Country	Time	Notes
1	Carling Zeeman	Canada	7:39.47	SA/B
2	Hannah Osborne	New Zealand	7:45.09	SA/B
3	Eeva Karppinen	Finland	7:53.11	SC/D
4	Felice Chow	Trinidad and Tobago	7:59.64	SC/D
5	Alejandra Alonso	Paraguay	8:27.64	SC/D

=== Semifinals C/D ===
The three fastest boats in each semi were sent to the C final. The remaining boats were sent to the D final.

==== Semifinal 1 ====
Rank	Rower	Country	Time	Notes
1	Marianne Madsen	Norway	7:52.54	FC
2	Eeva Karppinen	Finland	7:57.07	FC
3	Kim Ye-ji	South Korea	7:59.47	FC
4	Alejandra Alonso	Paraguay	8:23.52	FD
5	Emily Morley	Bahamas	8:32.01	FD

==== Semifinal 2 ====
Rank	Rower	Country	Time	Notes
1	Elza Gulbe	Latvia	7:46.57	FC
2	Duan Jingli	China	7:47.34	FC
3	Felice Chow	Trinidad and Tobago	7:48.41	FC
4	Olha Hurkovska	Ukraine	7:56.43	FD
5	Sarah Fraincart	Morocco	8:47.92	FD

=== Semifinals A/B ===
The three fastest boats in each semi advanced to the A final. The remaining boats were sent to the B final.

==== Semifinal 1 ====
Rank	Rower	Country	Time	Notes
1	Victoria Thornley	Great Britain	7:31.72	FA
2	Lisa Scheenaard	Netherlands	7:34.09	FA
3	Carling Zeeman	Canada	7:34.53	FA
4	Fie Udby Erichsen	Denmark	7:36.49	FB
5	Lucie Žabová	Czech Republic	7:51.06	FB
6	Virginia Diaz	Spain	7:59.97	FB

==== Semifinal 2 ====
Rank	Rower	Country	Time	Notes
1	Jeannine Gmelin	Switzerland	7:26.90	FA
2	Sanita Pušpure	Ireland	7:26.93	FA
3	Magdalena Lobnig	Austria	7:27.79	FA
4	Felice Mueller	United States	7:27.89	FB
5	Annekatrin Thiele	Germany	7:39.39	FB
6	Hannah Osborne	New Zealand	7:48.04	FB

=== Finals ===
The A final determined the rankings for places 1 to 6. Additional rankings were determined in the other finals.

==== Final D ====
Rank	Rower	Country	Time
1	Olha Hurkovska	Ukraine	8:01.89
2	Alejandra Alonso	Paraguay	8:15.43
3	Emily Morley	Bahamas	8:17.17
4	Sarah Fraincart	Morocco	8:30.33

==== Final C ====
Rank	Rower	Country	Time
1	Duan Jingli	China	7:39.10
2	Marianne Madsen	Norway	7:40.88
3	Elza Gulbe	Latvia	7:43.22
4	Eeva Karppinen	Finland	7:45.58
5	Felice Chow	Trinidad and Tobago	7:51.23
6	Kim Ye-ji	South Korea	7:52.13

==== Final B ====
Rank	Rower	Country	Time
1	Felice Mueller	United States	7:32.24
2	Hannah Osborne	New Zealand	7:40.57
3	Fie Udby Erichsen	Denmark	7:40.89
4	Annekatrin Thiele	Germany	7:43.90
5	Virginia Diaz	Spain	7:52.38
6	Lucie Žabová	Czech Republic	7:57.43

==== Final A ====
Rank	Rower	Country	Time
1st place, gold medalist(s)	Jeannine Gmelin	Switzerland	7:22.58
2nd place, silver medalist(s)	Victoria Thornley	Great Britain	7:24.50
3rd place, bronze medalist(s)	Magdalena Lobnig	Austria	7:26.56
4	Sanita Pušpure	Ireland	7:26.91
5	Lisa Scheenaard	Netherlands	7:32.69
6	Carling Zeeman	Canada	7:35.93
