= Togo at the 2020 Summer Olympics =

- IOC code: TOG
- NOC: Togolese National Olympic Committee
- Website: olympics.com/ioc/togo (in English)

in Tokyo, Japan July 23, 2021 – August 8, 2021
- Competitors: 4 in 4 sports
- Flag bearers (opening): Claire Ayivon; Dodji Fanny
- Flag bearer (closing): Claire Ayivon
- Medals: Gold 0 Silver 0 Bronze 0 Total 0

Summer Olympics appearances (overview)
- 1972; 1976–1980; 1984; 1988; 1992; 1996; 2000; 2004; 2008; 2012; 2016; 2020; 2024

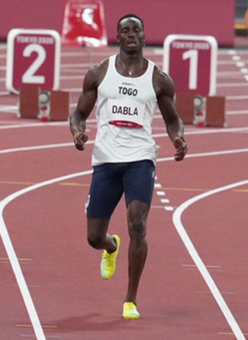
Sprinter Fabrice Dabla during the 2020 Summer Olympics

Togo competed at the 2020 Summer Olympics in Tokyo. Originally scheduled to take place from 24 July to 9 August 2020, the Games were postponed to 23 July to 8 August 2021, due to the COVID-19 pandemic. Since the nation made its debut in 1972, Togolese athletes participated in every edition of the Summer Olympic Games, except for two occasions, the 1976 Summer Olympics in Montreal, and the 1980 Summer Olympics in Moscow because of the African and the US-led boycotts, respectively.

Togo stood with four athletes in four sports. The Togolese athletes did not win any medals, marking the third consecutive Olympiad without any Togolese medals. Togo had previously won a single medal; Benjamin Boukpeti at the 2008 Summer Olympics.

== Competitors ==
The following is the list of number of competitors in the Games.

Sport	Men	Women	Total
Athletics	1	0	1
Rowing	0	1	1
Swimming	1	0	1
Table tennis	1	0	1
Total	3	1	4

== Athletics ==
Togo received a universality slot from the World Athletics to send a male track and field athlete to the Olympics.

Key

- Note–Ranks given for track events are within the athlete's heat only
- Q = Qualified for the next round
- q = Qualified for the next round as a fastest loser or, in field events, by position without achieving the qualifying target
- NR = National record
- N/A = Round not applicable for the event
- Bye = Athlete not required to compete in round

Track & road events

Athlete	Event	Heat		Quarterfinal		Semifinal		Final	
Athlete	Event	Result	Rank	Result	Rank	Result	Rank	Result	Rank
Fabrice Dabla	Men's 100 m	10.57	2 Q	DSQ		did not advance			

== Rowing ==
Togo qualified one boat in the women's single sculls for the Games by finishing second in the B-final and securing the fourth of five berths available at the 2019 FISA African Olympic Qualification Regatta in Tunis, Tunisia.

Athlete	Event	Heats		Repechage		Quarterfinals		Semifinals		Final	
Athlete	Event	Time	Rank	Time	Rank	Time	Rank	Time	Rank	Time	Rank
Claire Ayivon	Women's single sculls	8:48.07	5 R	9:04.23	4 SE/F	Bye		9:15.29	4 FF	8:44.42	31

Qualification Legend: FA=Final A (medal); FB=Final B (non-medal); FC=Final C (non-medal); FD=Final D (non-medal); FE=Final E (non-medal); FF=Final F (non-medal); SA/B=Semifinals A/B; SC/D=Semifinals C/D; SE/F=Semifinals E/F; QF=Quarterfinals; R=Repechage

== Swimming ==
Togo received a universality invitation from FINA to send a male top-ranked swimmer in his respective individual event to the Olympics, based on the FINA Points System of June 28, 2021.

Athlete	Event	Heat		Semifinal		Final	
Athlete	Event	Time	Rank	Time	Rank	Time	Rank
Mawupemon Otogbe	Men's 50 m freestyle	25.68	57	did not advance			

== Table tennis ==
Togo received an invitation from the Tripartite Commission to compete in the men's singles event, signifying the nation's return to the sport for the first time since London 2012.

Athlete	Event	Preliminary	Round 1	Round 2	Round 3	Round of 16	Quarterfinals	Semifinals	Final / BM	
Athlete	Event	Opposition Result	Opposition Result	Opposition Result	Opposition Result	Opposition Result	Opposition Result	Opposition Result	Opposition Result	Rank
Dodji Fanny	Men's singles	Bye	Gaćina (CRO); L 0–4	did not advance						
