= Togo at the 2012 Summer Olympics =

- IOC code: TOG
- NOC: Comité National Olympique Togolais

in London
- Competitors: 6 in 5 sports
- Flag bearers: Benjamin Boukpeti (opening); Kouami Sacha Denanyoh (closing)
- Medals: Gold 0 Silver 0 Bronze 0 Total 0

Summer Olympics appearances (overview)
- 1972; 1976–1980; 1984; 1988; 1992; 1996; 2000; 2004; 2008; 2012; 2016; 2020; 2024

Togo competed at the 2012 Summer Olympics in London, held from July 27 to 12 August 2012. This was the nation's ninth appearance at the Olympics, except the 1976 Summer Olympics in Montreal, and the 1980 Summer Olympics in Moscow because of the African and the United States boycott.

The Togo National Olympic Committee (French: Comité National Olympique Togolais) sent the nation's largest delegation to the Games after the 1992 Summer Olympics in Barcelona. A total of six athletes, four men and two women, competed in five different sports, including the nation's debut in swimming and table tennis. Freestyle swimmer Adzo Kpossi, at age 13, became the youngest athlete ever to compete in these Olympic games. Meanwhile, judoka Kouami Sacha Denanyoh, at age 32. was the oldest of the team, and competed at his third Olympics since 2000 (except the 2004 Summer Olympics in Athens, where he was not selected). Slalom kayaker Benjamin Boukpeti was Togo's greatest highlight to these games. He set several distinctions: the inaugural Togolese athlete to win an Olympic medal (a bronze), achieved in Beijing, to compete in his third consecutive Olympic Games, and to reprise his role to bear the national flag for the second time at the opening ceremony.

Togo did not achieve any medals at these Games, although Boukpeti placed last in the men's slalom kayak finals.

== Athletics ==
Key

- Note–Ranks given for track events are within the athlete's heat only
- Q = Qualified for the next round
- q = Qualified for the next round as a fastest loser or, in field events, by position without achieving the qualifying target
- NR = National record
- N/A = Round not applicable for the event
- Bye = Athlete not required to compete in round

Men

Athlete	Event	Heat		Semifinal		Final	
Athlete	Event	Result	Rank	Result	Rank	Result	Rank
Lankantien Lamboni	400 m hurdles	DSQ		did not advance			

Women

Athlete	Event	Heat		Quarterfinal		Semifinal		Final	
Athlete	Event	Result	Rank	Result	Rank	Result	Rank	Result	Rank
Bamab Napo	100 m	12.24	3 q	12.35	8	did not advance			

== Canoeing ==
=== Slalom ===
Togo was given a tripartite invitation.

Athlete	Event	Preliminary						Semifinal		Final	
Athlete	Event	Run 1	Rank	Run 2	Rank	Best	Rank	Time	Rank	Time	Rank
Benjamin Boukpeti	Men's K-1	95.28	17	90.52	10	90.52	14 Q	98.13	6 Q	152.23	10

== Judo ==
Togo has had 1 judoka invited.

Athlete	Event	Round of 32	Round of 16	Quarterfinals	Semifinals	Repechage	Final / BM	
Athlete	Event	Opposition Result	Opposition Result	Opposition Result	Opposition Result	Opposition Result	Opposition Result	Rank
Kouami Sacha Denanyoh	Men's −81 kg	Bozbayev (KAZ); L 0000–0200	did not advance					

== Swimming ==
Women

Athlete	Event	Heat		Semifinal		Final	
Athlete	Event	Time	Rank	Time	Rank	Time	Rank
Adzo Kpossi	50 m freestyle	37.55	72	did not advance			

== Table tennis ==
Togo has been given a wild card.

Athlete	Event	Preliminary round	Round 1	Round 2	Round 3	Round 4	Quarterfinals	Semifinals	Final / BM	
Athlete	Event	Opposition Result	Opposition Result	Opposition Result	Opposition Result	Opposition Result	Opposition Result	Opposition Result	Opposition Result	Rank
Mawussi Agbetoglo	Men's singles	Han (AUS); L 2–4	did not advance							
