= Togo at the 2014 Winter Olympics =

- IOC code: TOG
- NOC: Comité National Olympique Togolais

in Sochi, Russia 7–23 February 2014
- Competitors: 2 in 2 sports
- Flag bearer (opening): Mathilde-Amivi Petitjean
- Flag bearer (closing): Alessia Afi Dipol
- Medals: Gold 0 Silver 0 Bronze 0 Total 0

Winter Olympics appearances (overview)
- 2014; 2018; 2022–2026

The West African country of Togo competed at the 2014 Winter Olympics held in Sochi, Russia, from 7 to 23 February 2014. It was the nation's first appearance at the Winter Olympics. The Togolese delegation consisted of two women athletes in two sports: Alessia Afi Dipol in alpine skiing and Mathilde-Amivi Petitjean in cross-country skiing. Petitjean was the flag bearer for the opening ceremony, while Dipol was the flag bearer for the closing ceremony. Neither athlete was able to secure a medal in their Olympic debut.

== Background ==
Togo made its first appearance at the Summer Olympics in 1972, but it had never sent a delegation to the Winter Olympics prior to 2014. Kelani Bayor, the then vice president of the Togo Olympic Committee, emphasised the importance of the Togolese diaspora in making Togo's debut at the Winter Games possible, as the country has no snow. Togo has a tropical climate and a temperature range of 22 to 32 °C (72 to 90 °F). Accordingly, neither of the two Togolese athletes grew up or trained in the country.

Alessia Afi Dipol was naturalised as a Togolese citizen just prior to the Games. Born and raised in Pieve di Cadore, in Veneto, Italy, Dipol had only been to Togo once before her Olympic debut. She explained that she chose to represent Togo because her father owns a sport clothing factory in the country.

Mathilde-Amivi Petitjean, meanwhile, was born in Niger to a Togolese mother and spent the majority of her life in Haute-Savoie, France, where she learned to ski. Petitjean's maternal lineage allowed her the opportunity to compete for Togo. The Togolese Ski Federation contacted Petitjean via Facebook in March 2013 and asked her to compete for the country at the Winter Olympics, to which she agreed.

Both athletes qualified through the Olympic quota allocation system. Petitjean was selected as the flag bearer for the opening ceremony, while Dipol was selected as the flag bearer for the closing ceremony.

== Alpine skiing ==
Dipol was 18 years old at the time of her Olympic debut in Sochi. In the first run of the women's giant slalom race, held on 18 February, Dipol placed 60th with a time of 1 minute and 31.66 seconds. In her second run, she placed 53rd with a time of 1 minute and 31.14 seconds. She ultimately finished 55th out of 74 competitors in the event, with a total time of 3 minutes and 2.8 seconds. She did not finish the women's slalom race, held on 21 February, after starting the first run.

Athlete	Event	Run 1		Run 2		Total	
Athlete	Event	Time	Rank	Time	Rank	Time	Rank
Alessia Afi Dipol	Women's giant slalom	1:31.66	60	1:31.14	53	3:02.80	55
Alessia Afi Dipol	Women's slalom	DNF					

== Cross-country skiing ==
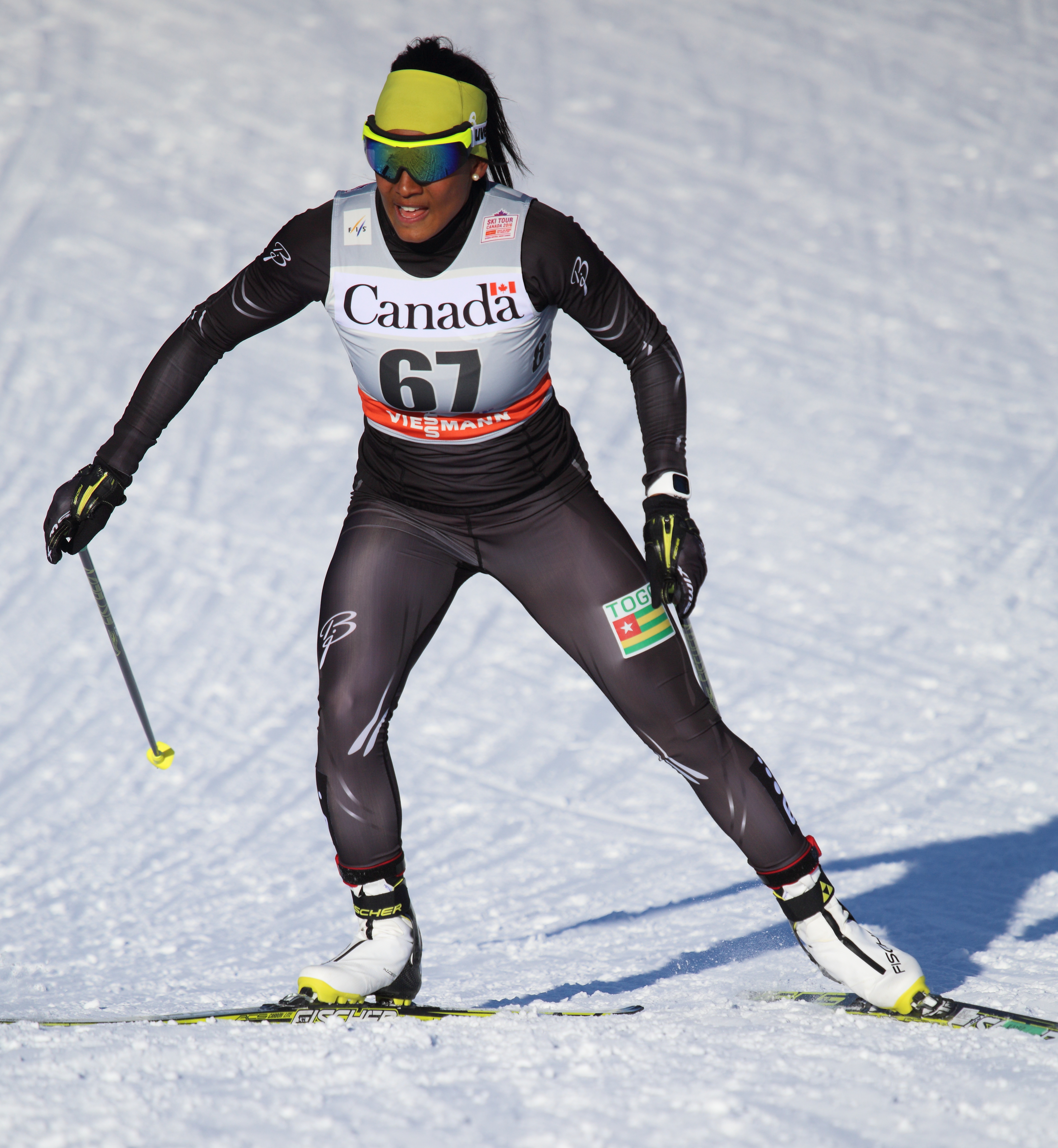
Mathilde-Amivi Petitjean competing at the 2016 Ski Tour Canada

Petitjean was 19 years old at the time of her Olympic debut in Sochi. She competed in the women's 10 kilometre classical race on 13 February and finished 68th (Note: Later changed to 65th due to the retroactive disqualification of three athletes.) out of 75 competitors with a time of 37 minutes and 26.7 seconds, nearly ten minutes behind the winner, Justyna Kowalczyk of Poland. Petitjean expressed hope that her appearance at the Games would inspire other African youth to participate in winter sports.

Athlete	Event	Final		
Athlete	Event	Time	Deficit	Rank
Mathilde-Amivi Petitjean	Women's 10 km classical	37:26.7	+9:08.9	68

== See also ==
- Tropical nations at the Winter Olympics
