= Rowing at the 2016 Summer Olympics – Women's single sculls =

Women's single sculls at the Games of the XXXI Olympiad
- Venue: Rodrigo de Freitas Lagoon
- Date: 6–13 August 2016
- Competitors: 32 from 32 nations
- Winning time: 7:21.54

Medalists
1st place, gold medalist(s)		Kim Brennan	Australia
2nd place, silver medalist(s)		Genevra Stone	United States
3rd place, bronze medalist(s)		Duan Jingli	China

The women's single sculls competition at the 2016 Summer Olympics in Rio de Janeiro was held on 6–13 August at the Lagoon Rodrigo de Freitas.

== Results ==
=== Heats ===
First three of each heat qualify to the quarterfinals, remainder goes to the repechage.

==== Heat 1 ====
Rank	Rower	Country	Time	Notes
1	Kenia Lechuga	Mexico	8:11.44	QF
2	Micheen Thornycroft	Zimbabwe	8:18.88	QF
3	Kim Brennan	Australia	8:22.82	QF
4	Kim Ye-ji	South Korea	8:24.79	R
5	Anna Malvina Svennung	Sweden	8:48.46	R
6	Emily Morley	Bahamas	9:22.12	R

==== Heat 2 ====
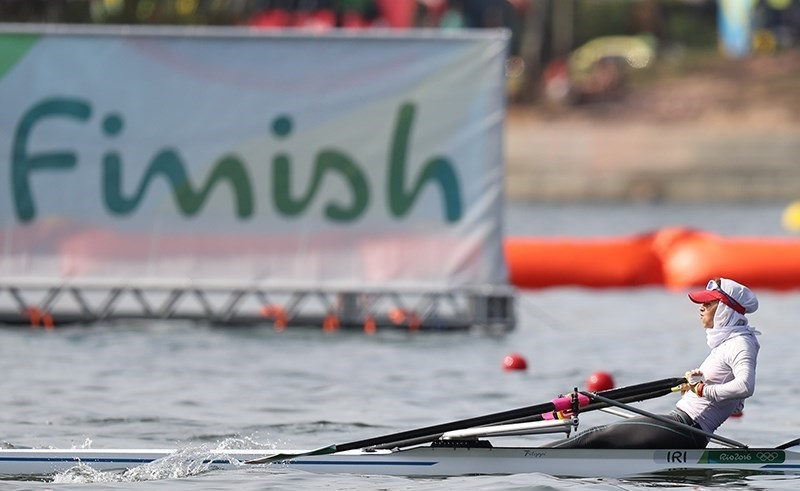
Iran's Mahsa Javar

Rank	Rower	Country	Time	Notes
1	Genevra Stone	United States	8:29.67	QF
2	Fie Udby Erichsen	Denmark	8:30.07	QF
3	Lina Šaltytė	Lithuania	8:35.92	QF
4	Mahsa Javar	Iran	8:39.28	R
5	Lucia Palermo	Argentina	8:47.01	R
6	Dewi Yuliawati	Indonesia	9:36.10	R

==== Heat 3 ====
Rank	Rower	Country	Time	Notes
1	Carling Zeeman	Canada	8:41:12	QF
2	Sanita Pušpure	Ireland	9:11:45	QF
3	Nadia Negm	Egypt	9:14:55	QF
4	Phuttharaksa Neegree	Thailand	9:17:95	R
5	Camila Valle	Peru	9:30:60	R

==== Heat 4 ====
Rank	Rower	Country	Time	Notes
1	Duan Jingli	China	8:18.57	QF
2	Jeannine Gmelin	Switzerland	8:28.10	QF
3	Saiyidah Aisyah	Singapore	8:44.71	QF
4	Huang Yi-ting	Chinese Taipei	8:51.74	R
5	Svetlana Germanovich	Kazakhstan	9:34.15	R

==== Heat 5 ====
Rank	Rower	Country	Time	Notes
1	Magdalena Lobnig	Austria	8:26.83	QF
2	Miroslava Knapková	Czech Republic	8:28.90	QF
3	Chierika Ukogu	Nigeria	8:35.34	QF
4	Amina Rouba	Algeria	8:55.09	R
5	Claire Akossiwa	Togo	9:56.43	R

==== Heat 6 ====
Rank	Rower	Country	Time	Notes
1	Emma Twigg	New Zealand	8:17.02	QF
2	Ekaterina Karsten	Belarus	8:21.21	QF
3	Michelle Pearson	Bermuda	8:22.15	QF
4	Gabriela Mosqueira	Paraguay	8:27.39	R
5	Felice Chow	Trinidad and Tobago	8:31.83	R

=== Repechage ===
First two qualify to the quarterfinals.

==== Repechage 1 ====
Rank	Rower	Country	Time	Notes
1	Amina Rouba	Algeria	8:04.21	QF
2	Felice Chow	Trinidad and Tobago	8:04.91	Q
3	Mahsa Javar	Iran	8:06.57	SE/F
4	Emily Morley	Bahamas	8:22.77	SE/F
5	Camila Valle	Peru	8:32.66	SE/F

==== Repechage 2 ====
Rank	Rower	Country	Time	Notes
1	Kim Ye-ji	South Korea	7:59.59	QF
2	Lucia Palermo	Argentina	8:00.59	QF
3	Huang Yi-ting	Chinese Taipei	8:01.27	SE/F
4	Claire Akossiwa	Togo	9:04.76	SE/F

==== Repechage 3 ====
Rank	Rower	Country	Time	Notes
1	Anna Malvina Svennung	Sweden	7:46.35	QF
2	Gabriela Mosqueira	Paraguay	7:59.32	QF
3	Svetlana Germanovich	Kazakhstan	8:00.42	SE/F
4	Phuttharaksa Neegree	Thailand	8:07.92	SE/F
5	Dewi Yuliawati	Indonesia	8:14.81	SE/F

=== Quarterfinals ===
==== Quarterfinals 1 ====
9 August, 08:10

Rank	Rower	Country	Time	Notes
1	Emma Twigg	New Zealand	7:31.79	SA/B
2	Miroslava Knapková	Czech Republic	7:37.04	SA/B
3	Kenia Lechuga	Mexico	7:44.11	SA/B
4	Kim Ye-ji	South Korea	7:51.80	SC/D
5	Gabriela Mosqueira	Paraguay	7:54.49	SC/D
6	Saiyidah Aisyah	Singapore	7:56.00	SC/D

==== Quarterfinals 2 ====
9 August, 08:20

Rank	Rower	Country	Time	Notes
1	Genevra Stone	United States	7:27.04	SA/B
2	Jeannine Gmelin	Switzerland	7:29.66	SA/B
3	Magdalena Lobnig	Austria	7:35.37	SA/B
4	Anna Malvina Svennung	Sweden	7:38.07	SC/D
5	Felice Chow	Trinidad and Tobago	8:02.53	SC/D
6	Nadia Negm	Egypt	8:25.75	SC/D

==== Quarterfinals 3 ====
9 August, 08:30

Rank	Rower	Country	Time	Notes
1	Fie Udby Erichsen	Denmark	7:33.24	SA/B
2	Micheen Thornycroft	Zimbabwe	7:34.38	SA/B
3	Carling Zeeman	Canada	7:34.52	SA/B
4	Michelle Pearson	Bermuda	7:34.90	SC/D
5	Chierika Ukogu	Nigeria	7:54.44	SC/D
6	Amina Rouba	Algeria	8:21.06	SC/D

==== Quarterfinals 4 ====
9 August, 08:40

Rank	Rower	Country	Time	Notes
1	Kim Brennan	Australia	7:26.86	SA/B
2	Duan Jingli	China	7:27.88	SA/B
3	Ekaterina Karsten	Belarus	7:28.03	SA/B
4	Sanita Pušpure	Ireland	7:28.68	SC/D
5	Lina Šaltytė	Lithuania	7:38.39	SC/D
6	Lucia Palermo	Argentina	7:56.61	SC/D

Notes:

- R: Repechage
- Q: Quarterfinals
- S: Semifinals

=== Semifinals A/B ===
First three of each heat qualify to the final A.

==== Semifinals A/B 1 ====
Rank	Rower	Country	Time	Notes
1	Kim Brennan	Australia	7:47.88	FA
2	Emma Twigg	New Zealand	7:48.20	FA
3	Jeannine Gmelin	Switzerland	7:49.83	FA
4	Carling Zeeman	Canada	7:54.07	FB
5	Micheen Thornycroft	Zimbabwe	8:00.53	FB
6	Kenia Lechuga	Mexico	8:14.76	FB

==== Semifinals A/B 2 ====
Rank	Rower	Country	Time	Notes
1	Duan Jingli	China	7:43.97	FA
2	Genevra Stone	United States	7:44.56	FA
3	Magdalena Lobnig	Austria	7:45.48	FA
4	Miroslava Knapková	Czech Republic	7:47.53	FB
5	Ekaterina Karsten	Belarus	7:48.89	FB
6	Fie Udby Erichsen	Denmark	8:08.65	FB

=== Semifinals C/D ===
First three of each heat qualify to the final C.

==== Semifinals C/D 1 ====
Rank	Rower	Country	Time	Notes
1	Lina Šaltytė	Lithuania	7:55.57	FC
2	Anna Malvina Svennung	Sweden	8:00.41	FC
3	Kim Ye-ji	South Korea	8:12.58	FC
4	Chierika Ukogu	Nigeria	8:18.55	FD
5	Amina Rouba	Algeria	8:22.34	FD
6	Saiyidah Aisyah	Singapore	8:22.45	FD

==== Semifinals C/D 2 ====
Rank	Rower	Country	Time	Notes
1	Sanita Pušpure	Ireland	7:53.48	FC
2	Michelle Pearson	Bermuda	8:05.78	FC
3	Lucia Palermo	Argentina	8:15.42	FC
4	Felice Chow	Trinidad and Tobago	8:20.07	FD
5	Gabriela Mosqueira	Paraguay	8:22.84	FD
6	Nadia Negm	Egypt	8:39.50	FD

=== Semifinals E/F ===
First three qualify to Final E, remainder to Final F.

==== Semifinals E/F 1 ====
Rank	Rower	Country	Time	Notes
1	Huang Yi-ting	Chinese Taipei	8:38.21	FE
2	Mahsa Javar	Iran	8:45.54	FE
3	Phuttharaksa Neegree	Thailand	8:51.99	FE
4	Camila Valle	Peru	9:11.91	FF

==== Semifinals E/F 2 ====
Rank	Rower	Country	Time	Notes
1	Svetlana Germanovich	Kazakhstan	8:29.81	FE
2	Dewi Yuliawati	Indonesia	8:39.95	FE
3	Emily Morley	Bahamas	8:46.09	FE
4	Claire Akossiwa	Togo	9:25.60	FF

=== Finals ===
==== Final F ====
Rank	Rower	Country	Time	Notes
1	Camila Valle	Peru	9:18.24	
2	Claire Akossiwa	Togo	9:54.54	

==== Final E ====
Rank	Rower	Country	Time	Notes
1	Huang Yi-ting	Chinese Taipei	8:34.53	
2	Svetlana Germanovich	Kazakhstan	8:38.25	
3	Phuttharaksa Neegree	Thailand	8:41.34	
4	Mahsa Javar	Iran	8:43.34	
5	Dewi Yuliawati	Indonesia	8:44.54	
6	Emily Morley	Bahamas	8:56.36	

==== Final D ====
Rank	Rower	Country	Time	Notes
1	Gabriela Mosqueira	Paraguay	7:44.62	
2	Chierika Ukogu	Nigeria	7:44.76	
3	Amina Rouba	Algeria	7:46.55	
4	Felice Chow	Trinidad and Tobago	7:50.23	
5	Saiyidah Aisyah	Singapore	7:55.73	
6	Nadia Negm	Egypt	8:09.47	

==== Final C ====
Rank	Rower	Country	Time	Notes
1	Sanita Pušpure	Ireland	7:27.60	
2	Lina Šaltytė	Lithuania	7:30.38	
3	Anna Malvina Svennung	Sweden	7:32.54	
4	Michelle Pearson	Bermuda	7:34.41	
5	Lucia Palermo	Argentina	7:50.59	
6	Kim Ye-ji	South Korea	7:52.68	

==== Final B ====
Rank	Rower	Country	Time	Notes
1	Miroslava Knapková	Czech Republic	7:22.86	
2	Ekaterina Karsten	Belarus	7:25.03	
3	Fie Udby Erichsen	Denmark	7:25.13	
4	Carling Zeeman	Canada	7:28.62	
5	Micheen Thornycroft	Zimbabwe	7:30.57	
6	Kenia Lechuga	Mexico	7:40.39	

==== Final A ====
Rank	Rower	Country	Time	Notes
1st place, gold medalist(s)	Kim Brennan	Australia	7:21.54	
2nd place, silver medalist(s)	Genevra Stone	United States	7:22.92	
3rd place, bronze medalist(s)	Duan Jingli	China	7:24.13	
4	Emma Twigg	New Zealand	7:24.48	
5	Jeannine Gmelin	Switzerland	7:29.69	
6	Magdalena Lobnig	Austria	7:34.86	
