= Togo at the Olympics =

- IOC code: TOG
- NOC: Comité National Olympique Togolais
- Medals Ranked 151st: Gold 0 Silver 0 Bronze 1 Total 1

Summer appearances
- 1972; 1976–1980; 1984; 1988; 1992; 1996; 2000; 2004; 2008; 2012; 2016; 2020; 2024

Winter appearances
- 2014; 2018; 2022–2026

Togo has sent athletes to every Summer Olympic Games held since 1972 except for 1976 and 1980, which they boycotted, winning their first Olympic medal at the 2008 Summer Olympics when Benjamin Boukpeti won bronze in the K1 kayak slalom event.

Togo made its Winter Olympic Games debut at the 2014 Winter Olympics in Sochi, where it sent two skiers to compete. Cross-country skier and Togolese flagbearer Mathilde-Amivi Petitjean was born in Togo to a Togolese mother and raised in France, while alpine skier Alessia Afi Dipol is an Italian-born Togolese citizen. The nation also participated in the 2018 Winter Olympics.

== Medal tables ==
=== Medals by Summer Games ===
Games	Athletes	Gold	Silver	Bronze	Total	Rank
1972 Munich	7	0	0	0	0	–
1976 Montreal	boycotted					
1980 Moscow	boycotted					
1984 Los Angeles	6	0	0	0	0	–
1988 Seoul	6	0	0	0	0	–
1992 Barcelona	6	0	0	0	0	–
1996 Atlanta	5	0	0	0	0	–
2000 Sydney	3	0	0	0	0	–
2004 Athens	3	0	0	0	0	–
2008 Beijing	4	0	0	1	1	80
2012 London	6	0	0	0	0	–
2016 Rio de Janeiro	5	0	0	0	0	–
2020 Tokyo	4	0	0	0	0	–
2024 Paris	5	0	0	0	0	–
2028 Los Angeles	future event					
2032 Brisbane	future event					
Total		0	0	1	1	151

=== Medals by Winter Games ===
Games	Athletes	Gold	Silver	Bronze	Total	Rank
2014 Sochi	2	0	0	0	0	–
2018 Pyeongchang	1	0	0	0	0	–
2022 Beijing	did not participate					
2026 Milano Cortina	did not participate					
2030 French Alps	future event					
2034 Utah	future event					
Total		0	0	0	0	–

=== Medals by summer sport ===
Sport	Gold	Silver	Bronze	Total
Canoeing	0	0	1	1
Totals (1 entries)	0	0	1	1

== List of medalists ==
Medal	Name	Games	Sport	Event
Bronze	Benjamin Boukpeti	2008 Beijing	Canoeing	Men's slalom K-1

== See also ==
- List of flag bearers for Togo at the Olympics
- Tropical nations at the Winter Olympics
- Togo at the Commonwealth Games
