= Togo at the 2018 Winter Olympics =

- Flag of Togo
- IOC code: TOG
- NOC: Comité National Olympique Togolais

in Pyeongchang, South Korea 9–25 February 2018
- Competitors: 1 in 1 sport
- Flag bearers: Mathilde-Amivi Petitjean (opening & closing)
- Medals: Gold 0 Silver 0 Bronze 0 Total 0

Winter Olympics appearances (overview)
- 2014; 2018; 2022–2026

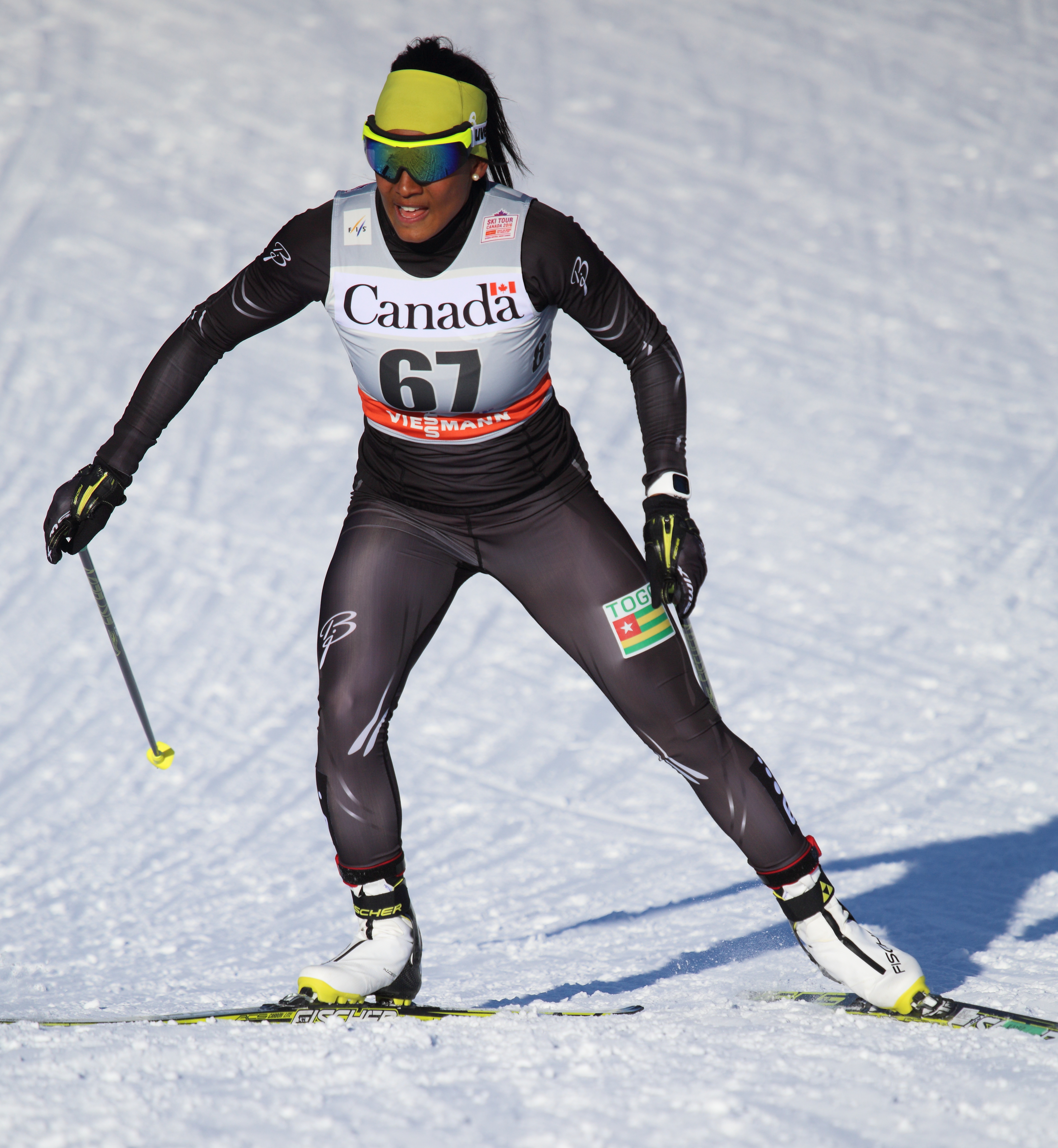
Mathilde-Amivi Petitjean competing at 2016 Ski Tour Canada.

The West African country of Togo competed at the 2018 Winter Olympics in Pyeongchang, South Korea, held from 9 to 25 February 2018. It was the nation's second appearance at the Winter Olympics. The Togolese delegation consisted only of Mathilde-Amivi Petitjean, who competed in cross-country skiing, in the Women's 10 km freestyle and Women's sprint events.

== Background ==
Togo made its first appearance at the Summer Olympics in 1972, but had never sent a delegation to the Winter Olympics prior to 2014. Alessia Afi Dipol and Mathilde-Amivi Petitjean competed for Togo in 2014, and both qualified again through the Olympic quota allocation system for the 2018 Winter Olympics, however Dipol did not ultimately compete. Petitjean was the flag bearer for both the opening and closing ceremonies.

Petitjean was born in Niger to a Togolese mother and spent the majority of her life in Haute-Savoie, France, where she learned to ski. Petitjean's maternal lineage allowed her the opportunity to compete for Togo.

== Cross-country skiing ==
Mathilde-Amivi Petitjean placed 59th in the Women's sprint event, and 83rd in the Women's 10 km freestyle. Petijean joined a record number of Africans attending the Winter Olympics. After competing, she said that she would like to see winter sports taken up by more Africans.

Distance

Athlete	Event	Final		
Athlete	Event	Time	Deficit	Rank
Mathilde-Amivi Petitjean	Women's 10 km freestyle	32:35.2	+7:34.7	83

Sprint

Athlete	Event	Qualification		Quarterfinal		Semifinal		Final	
Athlete	Event	Time	Rank	Time	Rank	Time	Rank	Time	Rank
Mathilde-Amivi Petitjean	Women's sprint	3:45.93	59	did not advance					
