= Togo at the 2016 Summer Olympics =

- IOC code: TOG
- NOC: Comité National Olympique Togolais

in Rio de Janeiro
- Competitors: 5 in 3 sports
- Flag bearer: Adzo Kpossi
- Medals: Gold 0 Silver 0 Bronze 0 Total 0

Summer Olympics appearances (overview)
- 1972; 1976–1980; 1984; 1988; 1992; 1996; 2000; 2004; 2008; 2012; 2016; 2020; 2024

Togo competed at the 2016 Summer Olympics in Rio de Janeiro, Brazil, from 5 to 21 August 2016. This was the nation's tenth appearance at the Summer Olympics.

The Togo National Olympic Committee (French: Comité National Olympique Togolais, CNOT) sent a team of five athletes, two men and three women, to compete only in athletics, swimming, and rowing at the Games. All of them made their Olympic debut in Rio de Janeiro, except for freestyle swimmer Adzo Kpossi, who established history for Togo by becoming the youngest athlete of the Games four years earlier. The lone returning Olympian from London 2012, Kpossi led the delegation as Togo's flag bearer in the opening ceremony.

Togo, however, left Rio de Janeiro without a single medal for the second consecutive time, failing to reproduce it from the 2008 Summer Olympics in Beijing, where slalom kayaker Benjamin Boukpeti bagged the bronze.

== Athletics ==
Togo has received universality slots from IAAF to send two athletes (one male and one female) to the Olympics.

Key

- Note–Ranks given for track events are within the athlete's heat only
- Q = Qualified for the next round
- q = Qualified for the next round as a fastest loser or, in field events, by position without achieving the qualifying target
- NR = National record
- N/A = Round not applicable for the event
- Bye = Athlete not required to compete in round

Track & road events

Athlete	Event	Heat		Quarterfinal		Semifinal		Final	
Athlete	Event	Result	Rank	Result	Rank	Result	Rank	Result	Rank
Fabrice Dabla	Men's 200 m	21.36	7	—		Did not advance			
Prénam Pesse	Women's 100 m	12.38	4	Did not advance					

== Rowing ==
Togo has received an invitation from the Tripartite Commission to send a rower in the women's single sculls to the Rio regatta, signifying the nation's Olympic debut in the sport.

Athlete	Event	Heats		Repechage		Quarterfinals		Semifinals		Final	
Athlete	Event	Time	Rank	Time	Rank	Time	Rank	Time	Rank	Time	Rank
Claire Akossiwa	Women's single sculls	9:56.43	5 R	9:04.76	4 SE/F	Bye		9:25.60	4 FF	9:54.54	32

Qualification Legend: FA=Final A (medal); FB=Final B (non-medal); FC=Final C (non-medal); FD=Final D (non-medal); FE=Final E (non-medal); FF=Final F (non-medal); SA/B=Semifinals A/B; SC/D=Semifinals C/D; SE/F=Semifinals E/F; QF=Quarterfinals; R=Repechage

== Swimming ==
Togo has received a Universality invitation from FINA to send two swimmers (one male and one female) to the Olympics.

Athlete	Event	Heat		Semifinal		Final	
Athlete	Event	Time	Rank	Time	Rank	Time	Rank
Eméric Kpegba	Men's 50 m freestyle	27.67	80	Did not advance			
Adzo Kpossi	Women's 50 m freestyle	33.44	79	Did not advance			
