= Kangni =

Kangni is both a Togolese masculine given name and surname. Notable people with the name include:

== Given name ==
- Kangni Alem (born 1966), Togolese writer, translator and literary critic
- Kangni Frederic Ananou (born 1997), German footballer

== Surname ==
- Roger Kangni (1944–2021), Togolese middle-distance runner
- Sandrine Thiébaud-Kangni (born 1976), French-Togolese sprinter
