= Togo at the 1992 Summer Olympics =

- IOC code: TOG
- NOC: Togolese National Olympic Committee

in Barcelona
- Competitors: 6 men in 2 sports
- Medals: Gold 0 Silver 0 Bronze 0 Total 0

Summer Olympics appearances (overview)
- 1972; 1976–1980; 1984; 1988; 1992; 1996; 2000; 2004; 2008; 2012; 2016; 2020; 2024

Togo was represented at the 1992 Summer Olympics in Barcelona, Catalonia, Spain by the Togolese National Olympic Committee.

In total, six athletes – all men – represented Togo in two different sports including athletics and cycling.

== Competitors ==
In total, six athletes represented Togo at the 1992 Summer Olympics in Barcelona, Catalonia, Spain across two different sports.

Sport	Men	Women	Total
Athletics	4	0	4
Cycling	2	0	2
Total	6	0	6

== Athletics ==
In total, four Togolese athletes participated in the athletics events – Kouami Aholou, Kossi Akoto, Kokou Franck Amegnigan and Boevi Lawson.

The heats for the men's 100 m took place on 31 July 1992. Lawson finished fourth in his heat in a time of 10.69 seconds which was ultimately not fast enough to advance to the quarter-finals.

The heats for the men's 400 m took place on 1 August 1992. Akoto finished sixth in his heat in a time of 46.97 seconds and did not to advance to the semi-finals.

The heats for the men's 200 m took place on 3 August 1992. Lawson finished third in his heat in a time of 21.05 seconds as he advanced to the quarter-finals. The quarter-finals took place later the same day. Lawson finished eighth in his quarter-final in a time of 21.47 seconds and he did not advance to the semi-finals.

The heats for the men's 4 x 100 m relay took place on 7 August 1992. Togo finished fifth in their heat in a time of 39.77 and they advanced to the semi-finals as one of the fastest losers. The semi-finals took place later the same day. Togo finished seventh in their semi-final in a time of 39.84 seconds and they did not advance to the final.

Athlete	Event	Heat		Quarterfinal		Semifinal		Final	
Athlete	Event	Result	Rank	Result	Rank	Result	Rank	Result	Rank
Kossi Akoto	400 m	46.97	6	did not advance					
Boevi Lawson	100 m	10.69	4	did not advance					
Boevi Lawson	200 m	21.05	3 Q	21.47	8	did not advance			
Kouami Aholou; Boevi Lawson; Kokou Franck Amegnigan; Kossi Akoto	4 × 100 m relay	39.77	10 q	—		39.84	7	did not advance	

== Cycling ==
In total, two Togolese athletes participated in the cycling events – Koku Ahiaku and Komi Moreira in the men's road race.

The men's road race took place on 2 August 1992. Ahiaku and Moreira did not finish.

Athlete	Event	Time	Rank
Koku Ahiaku	Men's road race	DNF	
Komi Moreira	Men's road race	DNF	
