= Togo at the 2008 Summer Olympics =

- IOC code: TOG
- NOC: Comité National Olympique Togolais

in Beijing
- Competitors: 4 in 4 sports
- Flag bearer: Benjamin Boukpeti
- Medals Ranked 80th: Gold 0 Silver 0 Bronze 1 Total 1

Summer Olympics appearances (overview)
- 1972; 1976–1980; 1984; 1988; 1992; 1996; 2000; 2004; 2008; 2012; 2016; 2020; 2024; 2028

Togo competed in the 2008 Summer Olympics held in Beijing, China from August 8 to August 24, 2008. At the men's slalom K-1 event, Benjamin Boukpeti won a bronze medal in canoeing, the first Olympic medal for the country.

== Medalists ==
Medal	Name	Sport	Event
Bronze	Benjamin Boukpeti	Canoeing	Men's slalom K-1

== Athletics ==
Women

Athlete	Event	Heat		Semifinal		Final	
Athlete	Event	Result	Rank	Result	Rank	Result	Rank
Sandrine Thiébaud-Kangni	400 m	54.16	7	Did not advance			

Key

- Note–Ranks given for track events are within the athlete's heat only
- Q = Qualified for the next round
- q = Qualified for the next round as a fastest loser or, in field events, by position without achieving the qualifying target
- NR = National record
- N/A = Round not applicable for the event
- Bye = Athlete not required to compete in round

== Canoeing ==
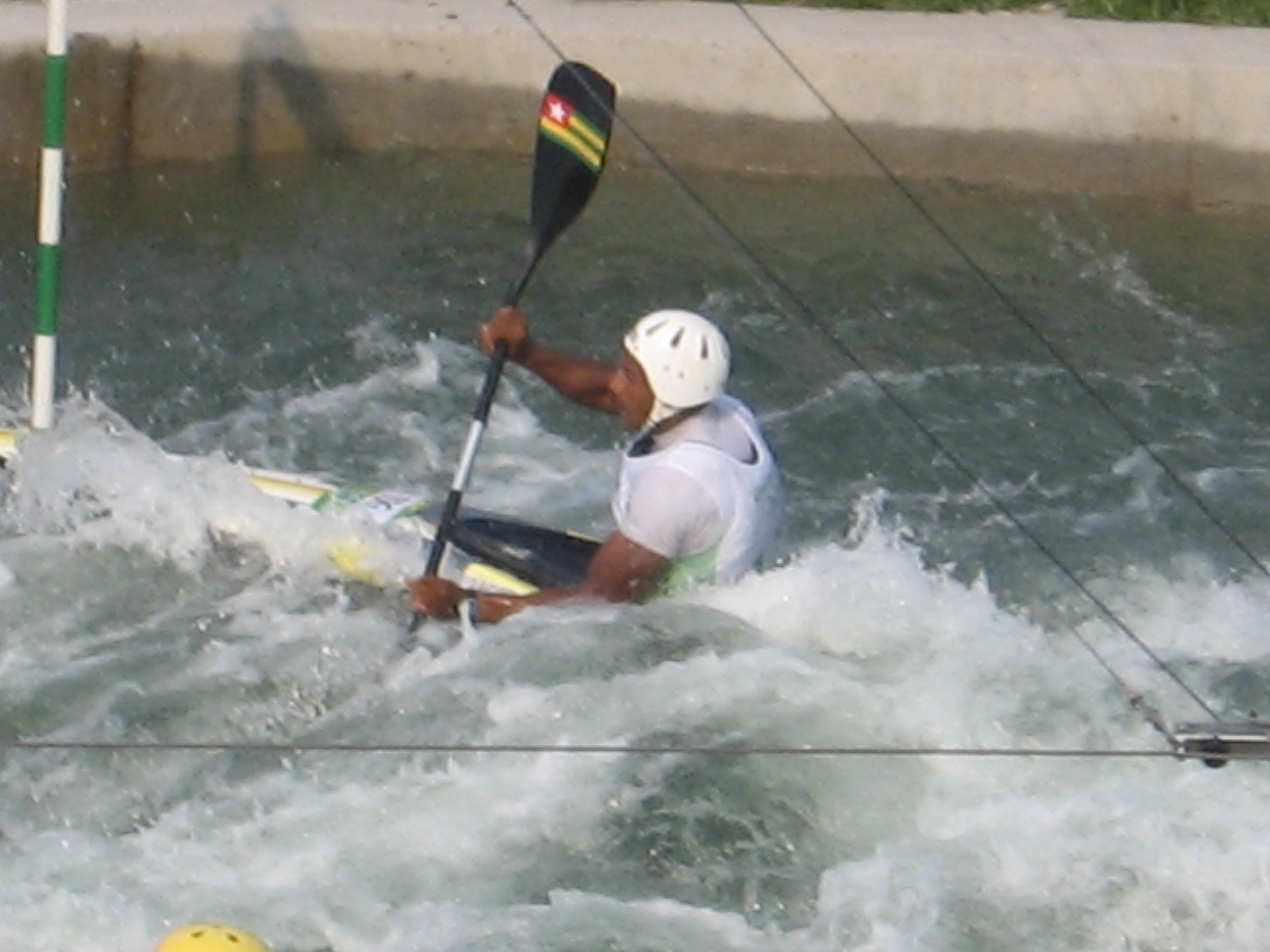
Boukpeti competing at the 2008 Summer Olympics.

=== Slalom ===
Athlete	Event	Preliminary						Semifinal		Final			
Athlete	Event	Run 1	Rank	Run 2	Rank	Total	Rank	Time	Rank	Time	Rank	Total	Rank
Benjamin Boukpeti	Men's K-1	90.17	20	82.09	1	172.26	8 Q	86.08	1 Q	87.37	3	173.45	3rd place, bronze medalist(s)

== Judo ==
Athlete	Event	Preliminary	Round of 32	Round of 16	Quarterfinals	Semifinals	Repechage 1	Repechage 2	Repechage 3	Final / BM	
Athlete	Event	Opposition Result	Opposition Result	Opposition Result	Opposition Result	Opposition Result	Opposition Result	Opposition Result	Opposition Result	Opposition Result	Rank
Kouami Sacha Denanyoh	Men's −81 kg	Bozorov (TJK); W 0011–0010	Gontiuk (UKR); L 0001–1010	Did not advance							

== Tennis ==
Athlete	Event	Round of 64	Round of 32	Round of 16	Quarterfinals	Semifinals	Final / BM	
Athlete	Event	Opposition Score	Opposition Score	Opposition Score	Opposition Score	Opposition Score	Opposition Score	Rank
Komlavi Loglo	Men's singles	Anderson (RSA); L 3–6, 2–6	Did not advance					
