= Togo at the 2004 Summer Olympics =

- IOC code: TOG
- NOC: Comité National Olympique Togolais

in Athens
- Competitors: 3 in 2 sports
- Flag bearer: Jan Sekpona
- Medals: Gold 0 Silver 0 Bronze 0 Total 0

Summer Olympics appearances (overview)
- 1972; 1976–1980; 1984; 1988; 1992; 1996; 2000; 2004; 2008; 2012; 2016; 2020; 2024; 2028

Togo competed at the 2004 Summer Olympics in Athens, Greece, from 13 to 29 August 2004. The country's participation at Athens marked its seventh appearance in the Summer Olympics since its debut at the 1972 Summer Games in Munich, West Germany. The delegation included two track and field athletes and a single canoeist; Jan Sekpona in the men's 800 metres, Sandrine Thiébaud-Kangni in the women's 400 metres, and Benjamin Boukpeti in the men's K-1. Both Sekpona and Thiébaud-Kangni were eliminated in the first round of their competitions, while Boukpeti progressed to the semi-finals.

== Background ==
Togo participated in seven Summer Olympics between its debut at the 1972 Summer Games in Munich, West Germany, and the 2004 Summer Olympics in Athens, Greece. The only occasions in that period which they did not attend was at the 1976 Summer Olympics in Montreal, Canada, and the 1980 Summer Olympics in Moscow, Soviet Union. On both occasions, it was because they had joined with international boycotts of the events. In 1976, they joined with other African nations in a boycott following the inclusion of the New Zealand team at the Games despite the breach of the international sports boycott of South Africa by the nation's rugby union team shortly prior. In 1980, Togo joined with the United States led boycott over the 1979 invasion of Afghanistan during the Soviet–Afghan War.

As of 2004, the highest number of Togolese participating at any one Games was seven at the nation's debut games in 1972. As of the 2004 Games, Togo had not yet won a medal. The first medal was won by Benjamin Boukpeti at the 2008 Summer Olympics in Beijing, China.

The Togolese team for the 2004 Athens Games featured canoeist Boukpeti competing in the men's K-1. This was his debut at an Olympic Games, although he would later return for both the 2008 and 2012 Games. Boukpeti had competed for France as a junior, but switched allegiance in adulthood to Togo since his father was born there. Boukpeti had only ever visited the country once, as a child. Boukpeti had changed his national allegiance in order to make Olympic qualification easier. He was the only competitor for an African national at the 2004 Games in the events held at the Deodoro Olympic Whitewater Stadium.

In athletics, Togo entered one male and one female athlete. Jan Sekpona made his only Olympic appearance, competing in the men's 800 metres, and Sandrine Thiébaud-Kangni made the first of two Olympic appearances for Togo, in the women's 400 metres. The two runners each qualified for the 2004 Games through the use of wildcard places, since their season best time fell outside of the "B" qualifying standards. Sekpona was Togo's flag bearer during the opening ceremony.

== Athletics ==
Jan Sekpona competed in the men's 800 metres on 25 August in the third heat. He finished in one minute and 54.25 seconds, resulting in him finishing last of the eight competitors in the heat, behind Bosnia and Herzegovina's Jasmin Salihović (one minute and 49.59 seconds). The top two athletes automatically qualified for the following round, along with Jean-Patrick Nduwimana from Burundi (one minute and 45.38 seconds) and Brazil's Osmar dos Santos (one minute and 45.90 seconds), who each qualified as some of the fastest runners-up across all heats. Sekpona did not advance and was eliminated from Olympic competition after the first heat.

The sole female Togolese athlete at the 2004 Games, Sandrine Thiébaud-Kangni, competed in the 400 metres. She ran in the fifth heat on 21 August, finishing in a time of 52.87 seconds in seventh position. This was only ahead of Sri Lanka's Damayanthi Dharsha (54.58 seconds), but was outside the time of Mireille Nguimgo from Cameroon (51.90 seconds), who was the slowest qualifier from the heat. Thiébaud-Kangni did not progress to the following round.

Key

- Note–Ranks given for track events are within the athlete's heat only
- Q = Qualified for the next round
- q = Qualified for the next round as a fastest loser or, in field events, by position without achieving the qualifying target
- NR = National record
- N/A = Round not applicable for the event
- Bye = Athlete not required to compete in round

Track & Road events

Athlete	Event	Heat		Semifinal		Final	
Athlete	Event	Result	Rank	Result	Rank	Result	Rank
Jan Sekpona	Men's 800 m	1:54.25	8	Did not advance			
Sandrine Thiébaud-Kangni	Women's 400 m	52.87	7	Did not advance			

== Canoeing ==
The sole Togolese canoeist, Benjamin Boukpeti competed in the men's K-1 competition. He competed in the qualifying round on 19 August, finishing in 9th place during the first run with a time of 96.99 seconds. He finished his second run in 101.93 seconds, placing him in 21st place. This gave him an overall total of 198.92 seconds, which put him in 15th place. Since the top 20 finishers qualified for the semi-final, Boukpeti made his way into the next round. There was a single run for the semi-final on 20 August, with Boukpeti's time of 102.42 seconds resulting in him finishing in 18th position out of the 20 canoeists. This was ahead of Pierpaolo Ferrazzi of Italy (103.07 seconds) and Switzerland's Michael Kurt (103.20 seconds). Only the top ten competitors qualified for the final, ending Boukpeti's competition.

Slalom

Athlete	Event	Preliminary						Semifinal		Final			
Athlete	Event	Run 1	Rank	Run 2	Rank	Total	Rank	Time	Rank	Time	Rank	Total	Rank
Benjamin Boukpeti	Men's K-1	96.99	9	101.93	21	198.92	15 Q	102.42	18	Did not advance			
