= Casa natale di Tiziano Vecellio =

Historic house museum in Italy

Coordinates: 46°25′40.62″N 12°22′31.01″E

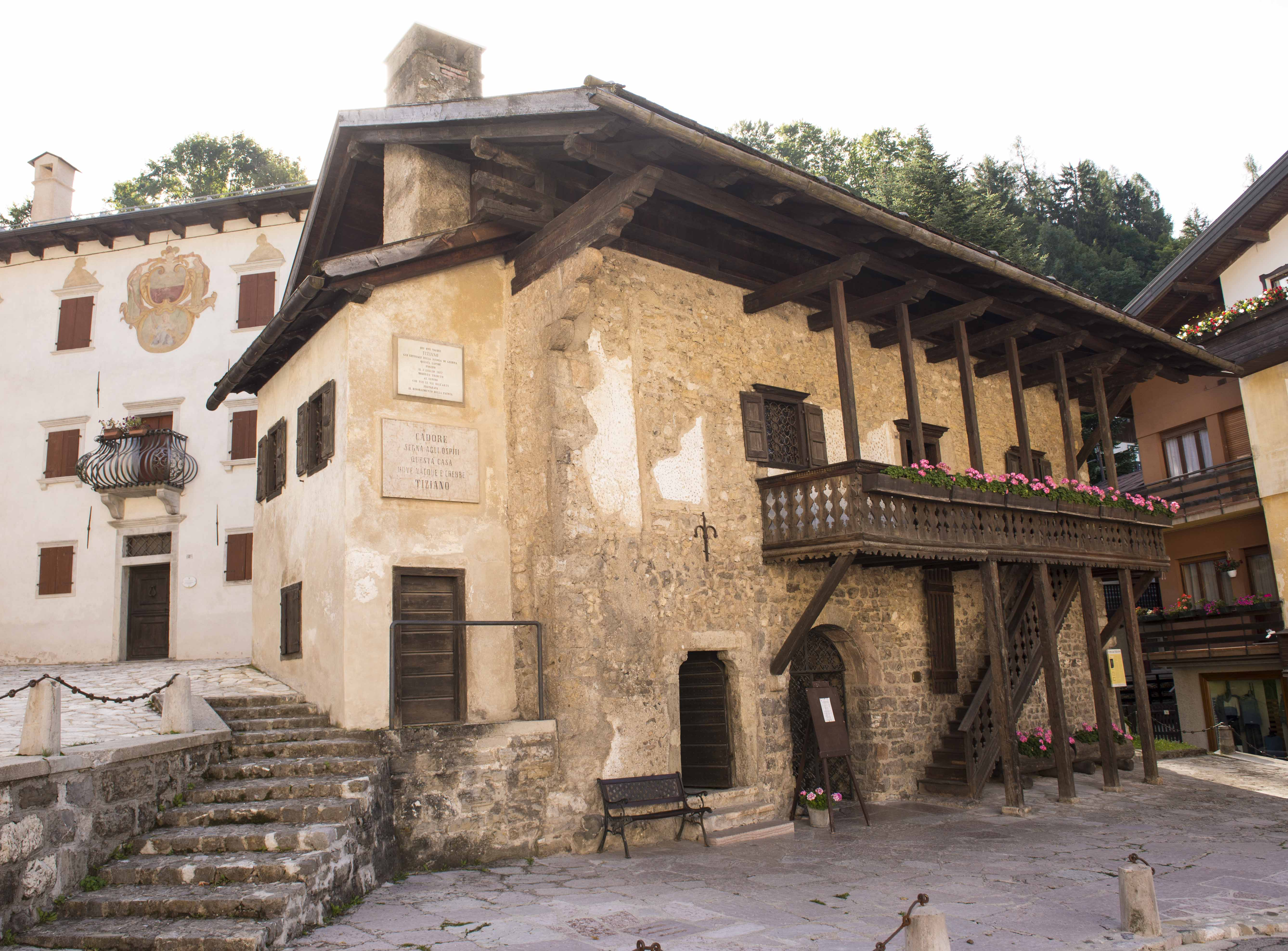
Casa natale di Tiziano Vecellio, in Pieve di Cadore

The Casa natale di Tiziano Vecellio (English: Birthplace of Tiziano Vecellio) is an historic house museum dedicated to Italian artist Titian, in Pieve di Cadore, in the province of Belluno.

== History and description ==
The house was originally built in the 15th century as a family residence, which was at the time a typical home of a distinguished local family. The more recent renovation works where commissioned in 1926 by the Magnifica Comunità di Cadore. The house museum was inaugurated, in the current form, in 1932.

The house where Titian was born, in the late 15th century, possibly c. 1488–1490, has been rebuilt and restored several times over the ages, but it still maintains the look of an ancient house in the style of that region. Some walls are entirely covered in wood, the furniture is rustic and the atmosphere welcomes the visitor into the world of the painter remembered for his great works.

This house-museum can be visited entirely and comprises two floors connected by a wooden staircase. On the ground floor there is a living room, where the visitors can admire reproductions of works of art and copies of autographed letters of Titian. It constitutes the starting point for the visitor, who can then visit more five characteristic rooms on the first floor. The kitchen does have a traditional fireplace.

== See also ==
- List of single-artist museums
