= Davide Minuzzo =

- Professional bodybuilder

Personal info
- Full name: Davide Minuzzo
- Born: December 30, 1974; Pieve di Cadore, Italy

Best statistics
- Height: 6 ft 0 in / 183cm
- Weight: 180lb / 82kg

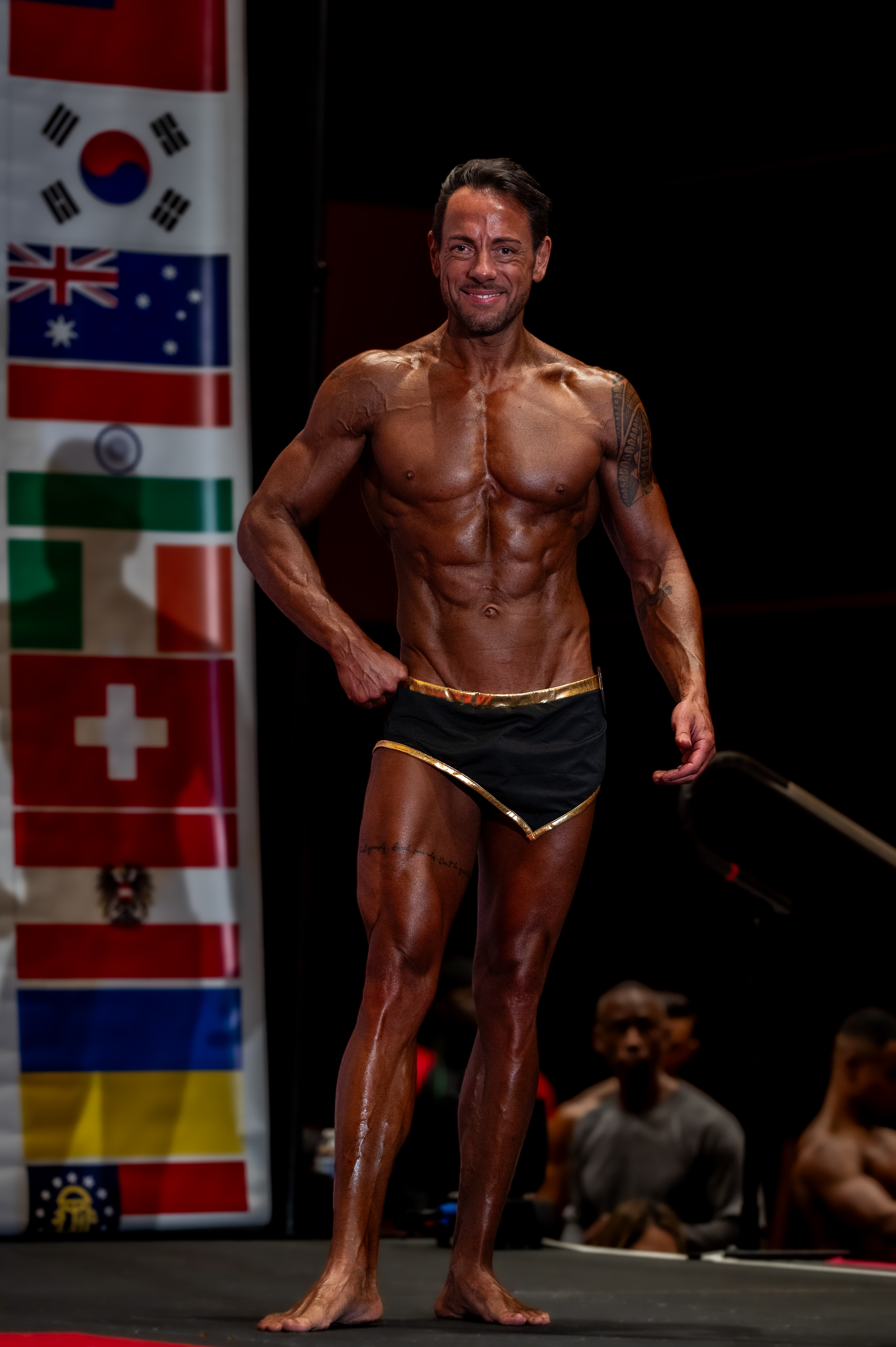
Davide Minuzzo at Natural Olympia XXVI in Las Vegas

Davide Minuzzo (Pieve di Cadore, December 30, 1974), also known as The Dolomites Master, is an Italian natural bodybuilder, fitness professional, wellness advocate, writer, and manager of EssilorLuxottica.

== Background and career ==
Minuzzo was born on December 31, 1974, in Pieve di Cadore, Italy. He started working at an apparel company, Safilo, and as a fitness trainer in the evening. At 28, his company asked him to move to Hong Kong, where he continued to pursue bodybuilding. Later he moved to New York and studied to become a professional nutritionist technician, health-life-mental coach, and Personal and athletic trainer. He is currently a North America Environment, Health and Safety Senior Manager at EssilorLuxottica.

He has won several bodybuilding competitions across aesthetic categories and became the first worldwide athlete over 45 years of age able to win seven gold medals in only one INBA/PNBA World Cup edition and the first Italian over 45 able to win 8 Natural Olympia gold medals through 4 different categories in only three INBA Natural Olympia editions.In 2025 he became a multiple World Champion, winning 4 gold medals in the various divisions of the Sport Model aesthetic category.. In October 2025, in Atlantic City, he won the Mr. America AM title in the Men's Physique category, becoming the first Italian in the 86-year history of the competition to win, thus establishing himself among the most prominent Italian natural bodybuilders at the international level.

== Main contest history ==
- 2020: OCB NY State Championship (Syracuse, US) Physique Master -- 1st (Pro Card)
- 2021: OCB World Championships (Pittsburgh, US) Physique Master -- Silver Medal
- 2021: WNBF Natural-mania (Westchester, US) Physique Master -- 2nd
- 2021: WNBF World Championship (Las Vegas, US) Physique Open -- 9th
- 2022: INBA Iron Man Magazine (Hermosa Beach, US) -- 4 times 1st (Pro Card)
- 2022: INBA Natural Olympia (Las Vegas, US) -- 2 Gold; 1 Silver; 2 Bronze (2 Pro Card)
- 2023: INBA World Cup (El Segundo, US) -- 7 times 1st Place (2 Pro Card)
- 2023: INBA Natural Olympia (Las Vegas, US) -- 2 Gold; 1 Bronze
- 2024: INBA Natural Olympia (Las Vegas, US) -- 4 Gold medals
- 2025: NPC Arnold Classic Amateur (Columbus, US) -- Physique Master 50 -- 1st
- 2025: INBA World Championship (Salou, ESP) -- 4 Gold Medals (Pro Card); 2 Silver
- 2025: Mr. America (Atlantic City, US) Physique Open, Master 40 -- 2 times 1st Place
- 2025: NPC Ben Weider Natural (Alexandria, US) Physique Master 50 -- 1st Place
- 2026: PNBA Natural Universe (Singapore) -- 3 times 1st Pro; 1st Classic Master Am (Pro Card)
