= Michelle Pearson (rower) =

Bermudian rower (born 1991)

Michelle Pearson (born April 16, 1991) is a Bermudian rower. She placed 16th in the women's single sculls event at the 2016 Summer Olympics. She graduated from Harvard University
