= Swimming at the 2015 African Games – Women's 50 metre butterfly =

Women's 50 metre butterfly at the 2015 African Games
- Venue: Kintele Aquatic Complex
- Date: September 7, 2015
- Competitors: 16 from 12 nations

Medalists
gold medal	Farida Osman	Egypt
silver medal	Vanessa Mohr	South Africa
bronze medal	Jessica Ashley Cooper	South Africa

The women's 50 metre butterfly event at the 2015 African Games took place on 7 September 2015 at Kintele Aquatic Complex.

== Schedule ==
All times are Congo Standard Time (UTC+01:00)

Date	Time	Event
Monday, 7 September 2015	10:33	Heat 1
Monday, 7 September 2015	10:35	Heat 2
Monday, 7 September 2015	18:00	Final

== Records ==
Prior to the competition, the existing world and championship records were as follows.

	Name	Nation	Time	Location	Date
World record	Sarah Sjöström	Sweden	24.43	Borås	5 July 2014
African record	Farida Osman	Egypt	25.78	Kazan	8 August 2015
Games record	Farida Osman	Egypt	27.08	Maputo	6 September 2011

The following new records were set during this competition.

Date	Event	Name	Nation	Time	Record
7 September	Heat	Farida Osman	Egypt	26.27	GR

== Results ==
=== Heats ===
Rank	Heat	Athlete	Time	Notes
1	2	Farida Osman (EGY)	26.27	Q, GR
2	2	Vanessa Mohr (RSA)	26.62	Q
3	1	Jessica Ashley Cooper (RSA)	27.36	Q
4	1	Heather Arseth (MRI)	28.31	Q
5	1	Maii Atif (EGY)	28.61	Q
6	1	Emily Muteti (KEN)	28.79	Q
7	2	Asma Sammoud (TUN)	28.98	Q
8	1	Tarryn Rennie (ZIM)	29.08	Q
9	2	Sylvia Brunlehner (KEN)	29.25	
10	2	Ana Nobrega (ANG)	29.65	
11	1	Gessica Stagno (MOZ)	30.28	
12	2	Avice Meya (UGA)	33.63	
13	1	Rahel Fseh Gebreselassie (ETH)	33.97	
14	2	Adzo Kpossi (TOG)	40.84	
15	2	Jannah Sonnenshein (MOZ)	NS	
16	1	Fatoumata Samassekou (MLI)	ABA	

=== Final ===
Rank	Athlete	Time	Notes
1st place, gold medalist(s)	Farida Osman (EGY)	26.31	
2nd place, silver medalist(s)	Vanessa Mohr (RSA)	26.39	
3rd place, bronze medalist(s)	Jessica Ashley Cooper (RSA)	27.02	
4	Heather Arseth (MRI)	28.53	
5	Asma Sammoud (TUN)	28.60	
6	Emily Muteti (KEN)	28.62	
7	Maii Atif (EGY)	28.73	
8	Tarryn Rennie (ZIM)	28.81	
