= Saiyidah Aisyah =

Singaporean rower

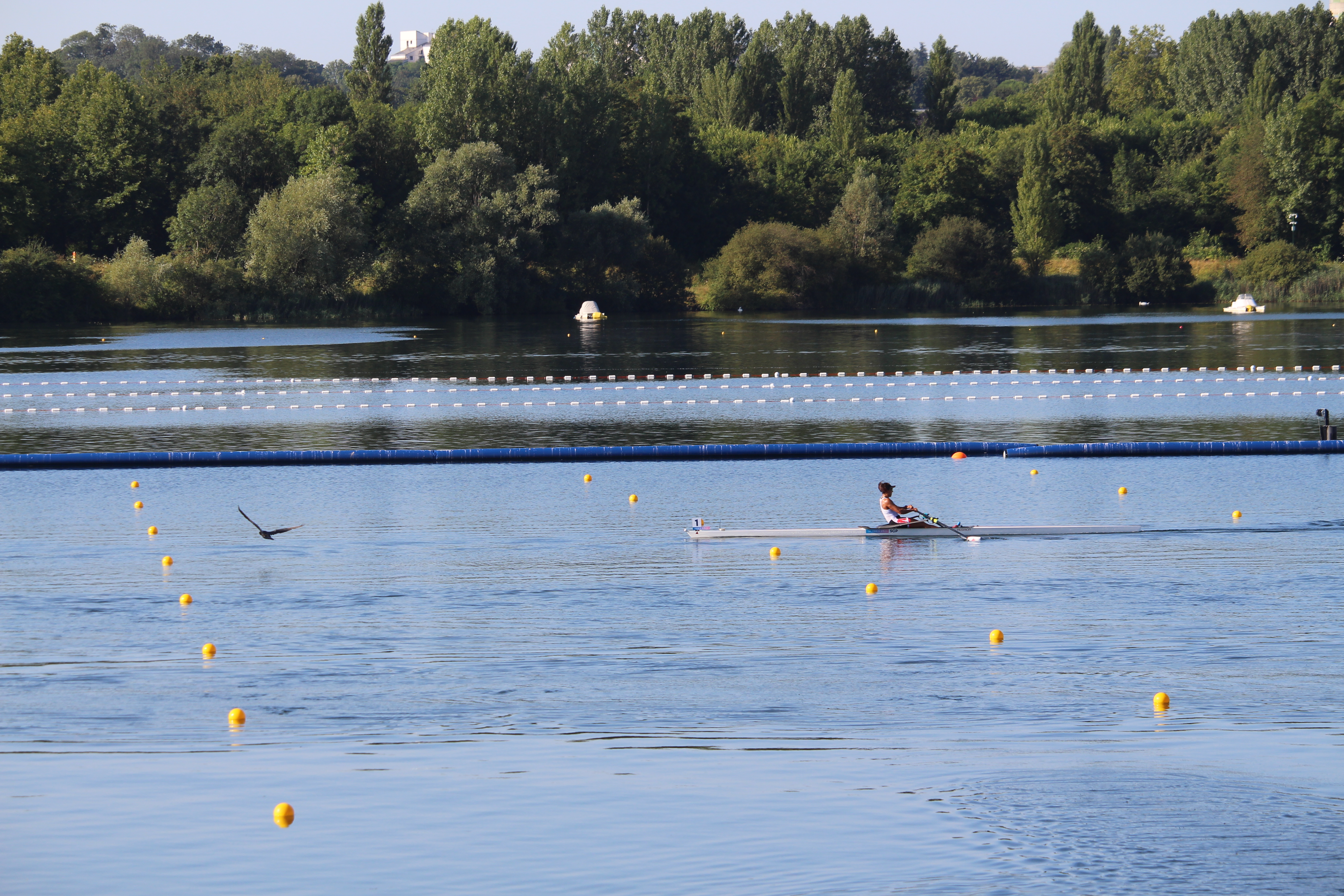
- Aisyah at the 2024 Summer Olympics

Personal information
- Full name: Saiyidah Aisyah Mohamed Rafa’ee
- Born: 20 April 1988 (age 38) Singapore
- Height: 173 cm (5 ft 8 in)
- Weight: 68 kg (150 lb)
Medal record
Southeast Asian Games
Gold medal – first place	2013 Myanmar	Single sculls
Bronze medal – third place	2007 Nakhon Ratchasima	Single sculls
Bronze medal – third place	2011 Jakarta	Single sculls
Bronze medal – third place	2011 Jakarta	Double sculls
Bronze medal – third place	2015 Singapore	Single sculls 500m
Bronze medal – third place	2015 Singapore	Single sculls 1000m

Saiyidah Aisyah binte Mohamed Rafa’ee (born 20 April 1988), commonly known as Aisyah, is a Singaporean rower. She placed 23rd in the women's single sculls event at the 2016 Summer Olympics, making her Singapore's first Olympic rower.

== Early life and career ==
Saiyidah Aisyah binte Mohamed Rafa'ee was born on 20 April 1988 in Singapore. Of Malay ethnicity, she played netball in her youth and was in Netball Singapore's 15 and Under National Squad in 2003. Aisyah was a Student Development Officer at Ngee Ann Polytechnic which she resigned in August 2015 to train full time for the Olympics Games.

== Rowing career ==
In 2013, Aisyah won the gold medal in the women's single sculls event at the 2013 SEA Games, the first rowing gold medal for Singapore.

=== 2016 Olympics ===
In 2015, Aisyah moved to Sydney, Australia, to train to qualify for the women's single sculls event at the 2016 Summer Olympics. However she failed to secure Team Singapore's Sports Excellence Scholarship and had to rely on her savings to fund her training. In February 2016, Aisyah turned to crowdfunding for her training and raised S$12,500. Aisyah would later received the Sports Excellence Scholarship in March.

In April, Aisyah won the B final of the 2,000 metres women's single sculls event at the 2016 Fisa Asia and Oceania Continental Olympic Qualification Regatta and became the first Singaporean rower to qualify for the Olympic Games. In June, Singaporean fried chicken restaurant chain 4Fingers Crispy Chicken, sponsored Aisyah for three months with a total of S$6,000 and part of the proceeds from sales of its burgers.

During the 2016 Olympics Games, Saiyidah qualified from her heats for the quarterfinals. Despite improving on her time, she was placed last in the quarterfinals. In the semifinals, Saiyidah was placed last again and competed in the D finals. She finished fifth out of six rowers and was placed 23rd overall. In end 2017, Aisyah announced her retirement.

=== 2024 Olympics ===
In October 2023, after meeting other Olympians during an Olympics Broadcast Training Programme, Aisyah decided to make a comeback for the 2024 Summer Olympics.

In April 2024, Aisyah competed at the women’s 2,000m lightweight single sculls at the Asian and Oceania Continental Qualification Regatta in Chungju, South Korea, to qualify for the 2024 Summer Olympics. To qualify for the Olympics Games, she had to finish in the first five out of six competitors but she finished sixth. Due to qualification rules, the second placed Japanese rower was denied qualification as Japan had maximised their quota with wins in the men's and women's double sculls events. As a result, Aisyah was given the last qualification spot and qualified for the Olympics.

== Personal life ==
She moved to Boston, Massachusetts, United States, in June 2019 and married American Ross Zuckerman in October.

== Sporting achievements ==
- 2015 SEA Games, Women's Lightweight Single Sculls (LW1X) 1000m - Bronze
- 2015 SEA Games, Women's Lightweight Single Sculls (LW1X) 500m - Bronze
- 2013 Myanmar SEA Games, Women's Lightweight Single Sculls – Gold
- 2011 Jakarta SEA Games, Women's Single Sculls – Bronze
- 2011 Jakarta SEA Games, Women's Pair – Bronze
- 2007 Jakarta SEA Games, Women's Lightweight Single Sculls – Bronze
