= Togo at the 1996 Summer Olympics =

- IOC code: TOG
- NOC: Comité National Olympique Togolais

in Atlanta
- Competitors: 5 in 1 sport
- Flag bearer: Téko Folligan
- Medals: Gold 0 Silver 0 Bronze 0 Total 0

Summer Olympics appearances (overview)
- 1972; 1976–1980; 1984; 1988; 1992; 1996; 2000; 2004; 2008; 2012; 2016; 2020; 2024

Togo competed at the 1996 Summer Olympics in Atlanta, United States. The flag bearer was Téko Folligan.

== Competitors ==
The following is the list of number of competitors in the Games.

| Sport | Men | Women | Total |
|---|---|---|---|
| Athletics | 5 | 0 | 5 |
| Total | 5 | 0 | 5 |

== Athletics ==
Men
Track & road events

| Athlete | Event | Heat | | Quarterfinal | | Semifinal | | Final | |
| Athlete | Event | Result | Rank | Result | Rank | Result | Rank | Result | Rank |
|---|---|---|---|---|---|---|---|---|---|
| Kossi Akoto | 400 metres | 46.94 | 45 | did not advance | | | | | |
| Koukou Franck Amégnigan | 100 metres | 10.51 | 55 | did not advance | | | | | |
| Boevi Lawson | 200 metres | 20.99 | 49 | did not advance | | | | | |
| Téko Folligan; Boevi Lawson; Justin Ayassou; Kossi Akoto (Note: Kossi Casimir Akoto (born 3 March 1969), the Togolese record-holder in three events, also competed at the 1992 Summer Olympics in two events.) | 4 x 100 metres relay | 39.56 | 17 | —N/a | | did not advance | | | |
