= Anna Malvina Svennung =

Swedish rower

Personal information
- Nationality: Swedish
- Born: October 24, 1984 (age 41)

Sport
- Sport: Rowing
- Event: women's single sculls

Achievements and titles
- Olympic finals: 2016 Summer Olympics

Anna Malvina Svennung (born 24 October 1984) is a Swedish rower. She placed 15th in the women's single sculls event at the 2016 Summer Olympics.
