= Togo at the 2024 Summer Olympics =

- IOC code: TOG
- NOC: Togolese National Olympic Committee
- Website: olympics.com/ioc/togo (in English)

in Paris, France 26 July 2024 – 11 August 2024
- Competitors: 5 (2 men and 3 women) in 4 sports
- Flag bearers (opening): Eloi Adjavon & Naomi Akakpo
- Flag bearer (closing): Akoko Komlanvi
- Medals: Gold 0 Silver 0 Bronze 0 Total 0

Summer Olympics appearances (overview)
- 1972; 1976–1980; 1984; 1988; 1992; 1996; 2000; 2004; 2008; 2012; 2016; 2020; 2024

Togo competed at the 2024 Summer Olympics in Paris from 26 July to 11 August 2024. Since the nation made its debut in 1972, Togolese athletes participated in every edition of the Summer Olympic Games, except for two occasions, the 1976 Summer Olympics in Montreal, and the 1980 Summer Olympics in Moscow because of the African and the US-led boycotts, respectively.

== Competitors ==
The following is the list of number of competitors in the Games.

Sport	Men	Women	Total
Athletics	0	1	1
Rowing	0	1	1
Swimming	1	1	2
Triathlon	1	0	1
Total	2	3	5

== Athletics ==
Togo sent one sprinter to compete at the 2024 Summer Olympics.

Key

- Note–Ranks given for track events are within the athlete's heat only
- Q = Qualified for the next round
- q = Qualified for the next round as a fastest loser or, in field events, by position without achieving the qualifying target
- NR = National record
- N/A = Round not applicable for the event
- Bye = Athlete not required to compete in round

Track events

Athlete	Event	Preliminary		Heat		Semifinal		Final	
Athlete	Event	Result	Rank	Result	Rank	Result	Rank	Result	Rank
Naomi Akakpo	Women's 100 m	12.34	5	Did not advance					

== Rowing ==
Togolese rowers qualified one boat in the women's single sculls for the Games through the 2023 African Qualification Regatta in Tunis, Tunisia.

Athlete	Event	Heats		Repechage		Semifinals		Final	
Athlete	Event	Time	Rank	Time	Rank	Time	Rank	Time	Rank
Akoko Komlanvi	Women's single sculls	8:44.88	5 R	8:43.11	5 SE/F	9:16.28	4 FF	8:46.73	32

Qualification Legend: FA=Final A (medal); FB=Final B (non-medal); FC=Final C (non-medal); FD=Final D (non-medal); FE=Final E (non-medal); FF=Final F (non-medal); SA/B=Semifinals A/B; SC/D=Semifinals C/D; SE/F=Semifinals E/F; QF=Quarterfinals; R=Repechage

== Swimming ==
Togo sent two swimmers to compete at the 2024 Paris Olympics.

Athlete	Event	Heat		Semifinal		Final	
Athlete	Event	Time	Rank	Time	Rank	Time	Rank
Jordano Daou	Men's 50 m freestyle	26.56	58	Did not advance			
Adèle Gaïtou	Women's 50 m freestyle	32.50	72	Did not advance			

Qualifiers for the latter rounds (Q) of all events were decided on a time only basis, therefore positions shown are overall results versus competitors in all heats.

== Triathlon ==
Togo entered one male triathlete. Eloi Adjavon qualified for the games after receiving the tripartite commission quota, marking the country's debut in the sport.

Individual

Athlete	Event	Time						Rank
Athlete	Event	Swim (1.5 km)	Trans 1	Bike (40 km)	Trans 2	Run (10 km)	Total	Rank
Eloi Adjavon	Men's	25:43	Lapped					
