= Mariama Sow =

Guinean swimmer

Personal information
- Nationality: Guinean
- Born: 19 May 2000 (age 26)

Sport
- Sport: Swimming

Mariama Sow (born 19 May 2000) is a Guinean swimmer. She competed in the women's 50 metre freestyle event at the 2016 Summer Olympics, where she ranked 87th with a time of 39.85 seconds. She did not advance to the semifinals.

Sow competed at the 2015 African Games in the 50 metre freestyle event. She placed 20th in the heats with a time of 43.44 seconds and did not qualify for the finals. She also competed at the 2015 World Aquatics Championships in the 50 metre freestyle, where she placed 111th with a time of 44.59 seconds and did not qualify for the semifinals.
