= Togo at the 2000 Summer Olympics =

- IOC code: TOG
- NOC: Comité National Olympique Togolais

in Sydney
- Competitors: 3 in 2 sports
- Flag bearer: Kouami Sacha Denanyoh
- Medals: Gold 0 Silver 0 Bronze 0 Total 0

Summer Olympics appearances (overview)
- 1972; 1976–1980; 1984; 1988; 1992; 1996; 2000; 2004; 2008; 2012; 2016; 2020; 2024; 2028

Togo competed at the 2000 Summer Olympics in Sydney, Australia. They were awarded no medals.

== Competitors ==
The following is the list of number of competitors in the Games.

Sport	Men	Women	Total
Athletics	1	1	2
Judo	1	0	1
Total	2	1	3

== Athletics ==
Men
Fields events

Athlete	Event	Heat		Final	
Athlete	Event	Result	Rank	Result	Rank
Georges Téko Folligan	Long jump	7.40	41	did not advance	

Women
Track & road events

Athlete	Event	Heat		Quarterfinal		Semifinal		Final	
Athlete	Event	Result	Rank	Result	Rank	Result	Rank	Result	Rank
Direma Banasso	800 m	2:13.67	32	did not advance					

== Judo ==
Men

Athlete	Event	Preliminary	Round of 32	Round of 16	Quarterfinals	Semifinals	Repechage 1	Repechage 2	Repechage 3	Final / BM	
Athlete	Event	Opposition Result	Opposition Result	Opposition Result	Opposition Result	Opposition Result	Opposition Result	Opposition Result	Opposition Result	Opposition Result	Rank
Kouami Sacha Denanyoh	−73 kg	BYE	Noureddine Yagoubi (ALG); L 0000-1001	did not advance							
