= Nadia Negm =

Egyptian rower

Nadia Negm (born July 23, 1998) is an Egyptian rower. She placed 24th in the women's single sculls event at the 2016 Summer Olympics.
