= Camila Valle =

Peruvian rower

Camila Valle (born July 7, 1995) (full name: Camila Lucero VALLE GRANADOS) is a Peruvian rower. She placed 31st in the women's single sculls event at the 2016 Summer Olympics. Categories: Senior and light weight.

She is an activist for the interests of Peruvian athletes. She is the chairperson of the Asociación de Deportistas del Perú (Association of Athletes of Peru), an advocacy group for athletes who have represented Peru internationally, which was registered in February 2021.
