= Adzo Kpossi =

Togolese swimmer (born 1999)

Personal information
- Full name: Adzo Rebecca Kpossi
- Nationality: Togolese
- Born: 25 January 1999 (age 27)
- Height: 1.58 m (5 ft 2 in) (2016)
- Weight: 53 kg (117 lb) (2016)

Sport
- Sport: Swimming
- Strokes: Butterfly; Freestyle

Adzo Rebecca Kpossi (born 25 January 1999) is a Togolese swimmer who specialises in butterfly and freestyle. Kpossi competed in both the 2012 and 2016 Summer Olympics. At both of her Olympics, she competed in the 50 metre freestyle. She has also competed in two World Championships, a World Short Course Championship and an African Games.

== Competition ==
Kpossi's debut at an international swimming competition was at the 2011 World Aquatics Championships, where she competed in both the 50 metre butterfly and 50 metre freestyle. In the 50 metre butterfly event, she finished last in her heat in a time of 55.17 seconds, around 25 seconds slower than the heat winner. Overall, her time was the slowest out of 51 athletes. In the 50 metre freestyle, Kpossi swam a time of 44.60 seconds in her heat and did not progress to the semi-finals.

=== 2012 Summer Olympics ===
At the 2012 Summer Olympics in London, United Kingdom, Kpossi competed in the 50 metre freestyle. By doing so at the age of 13 years and 191 days, she became the youngest ever Togolese Olympian. She was also the youngest competitor from any country at the 2012 Games. In her competition, she swam a time 37.55 seconds to finish second in her three-swimmer heat. Her time was the second slowest overall, with only Masempe Theko (Lesotho) slower. Kpossi did not qualify for the semi-finals, and, therefore, her competition was over.

=== Other competitions between 2012 and 2016 ===
At the 2012 World Short Course Championships, Kpossi competed in three events; the 50 metre butterfly, the 50 metre freestyle and the 100 metre individual medley. In the butterfly race, Kpossi swam a time of 43.00 seconds, a time that was the 77th quickest from the 79 competitors in the heat round. Kpossi was disqualified from both of her other events. At the 2015 World Aquatics Championships, Kpossi competed in the 50 metre freestyle. She swam a heat time of 34.26 seconds to finish 103rd overall out of 113 swimmers and not qualify for the semi-finals. Kpossi's next major competition was the 2015 African Games. In her heat of the 50 metre freestyle, she swam a time of 33.62 seconds to finish 17 overall and not qualify for the semi-finals.

=== 2016 Summer Olympics ===
At the 2016 Summer Olympics, Kpossi competed in the 50 metre freestyle. She was Togo's flag bearer at both the opening and closing ceremonies. For her event, Kpossi was drawn in heat three, a heat containing seven other athletes alongside Kpossi. In the race on 12 August 2016, Kpossi swam a time of 33.44 seconds to finish sixth in her heat. Kpossi's time was the 79th quickest out off 88 finishing athletes. She did not progress to the next round.

== Major results ==
=== Individual ===
==== Long course ====
Year	Competition	Venue	Position	Event	Notes
Representing Togo
2011	World Championships	Shanghai, China	86th (h)	50 m freestyle	44.60
2011	World Championships	Shanghai, China	51st (h)	50 m butterfly	55.17
2012	Olympic Games	(United Kingdom) London, Great Britain	72nd (h)	50 m freestyle	37.55
2015	World Championships	Kazan, Russia	103rd (h)	50 m freestyle	34.46
2015	African Games	(Republic of the Congo) Brazzaville, Congo	17th (h)	50 m freestyle	33.62
2015	African Games	(Republic of the Congo) Brazzaville, Congo	14th (h)	50 m butterfly	40.84
2016	Olympic Games	Rio de Janeiro, Brazil	79th (h)	50 m freestyle	33.44
2017	World Championships	Budapest, Hungary	80th (h)	50 m freestyle	32.26

==== Short course ====
Year	Competition	Venue	Position	Event	Notes
Representing Togo
2012	World Championships	Istanbul, Turkey	-	50 m freestyle	DSQ
2012	World Championships	Istanbul, Turkey	77th (h)	50 m butterfly	43.00
2012	World Championships	Istanbul, Turkey	-	100 m medley	DSQ
2016	World Championships	Windsor, Canada	-	50 m freestyle	DNS

Olympic Games
Preceded by Mathilde-Amivi Petitjean	Flagbearer for Togo; Rio de Janeiro 2016	Succeeded by Claire Ayivon; Dodji Fanny
