= Mathilde-Amivi Petitjean =

French-Togolese cross-country skier (born 1994)

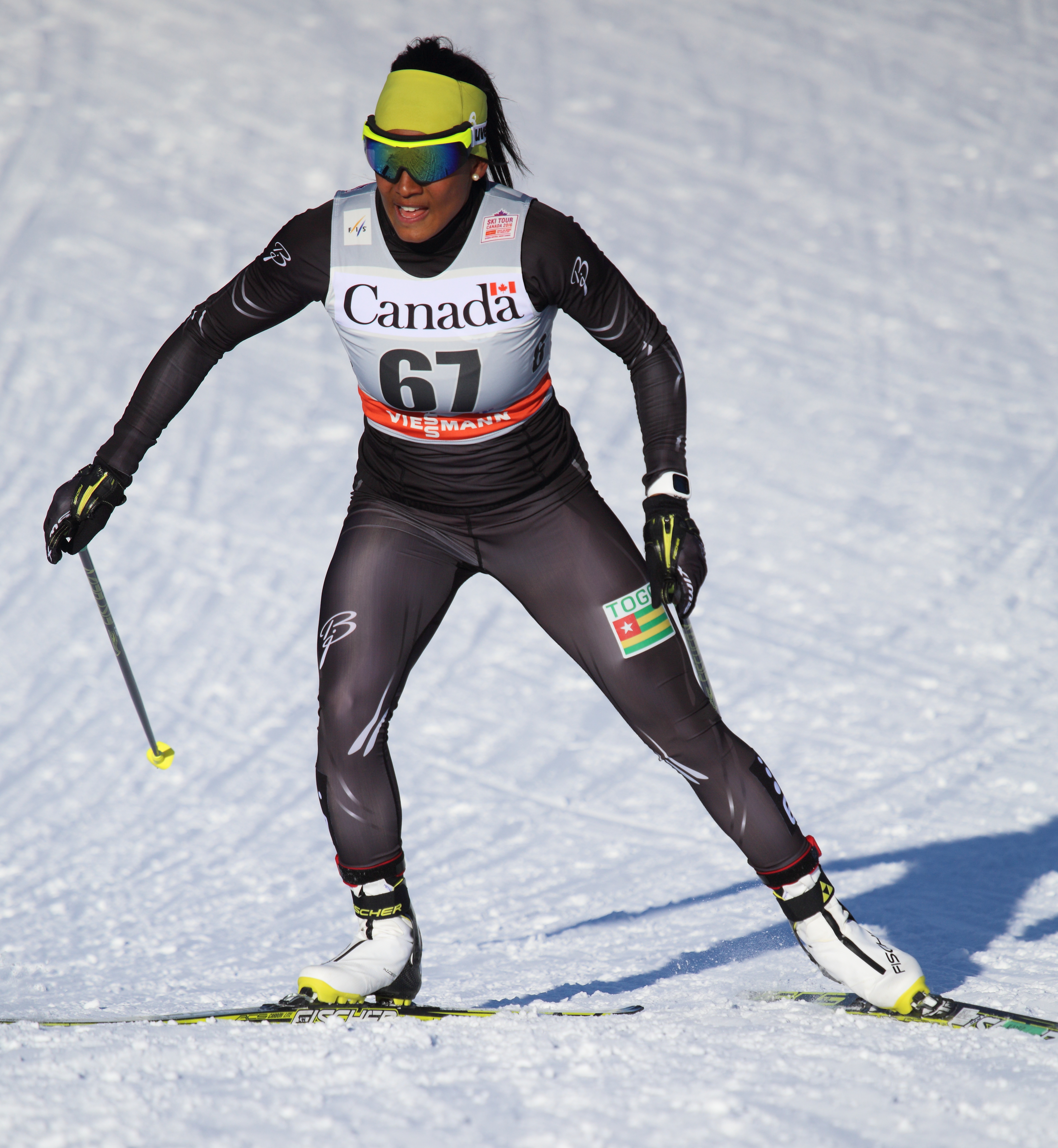
- Petitjean in 2016

Personal information
- Nationality: France; Togo
- Born: 19 February 1994 (age 32) Kpalimé, Togo

Sport
- Sport: Skiing

World Cup career
- Seasons: 3 – (2016–2018)
- Indiv. starts: 9
- Indiv. podiums: 0
- Team starts: 0
- Overall titles: 0
- Discipline titles: 0

Mathilde-Amivi Petitjean (born 19 February 1994) is a French-Togolese cross-country skier. She competed for Togo at the 2014 Winter Olympics in the 10 km classical race. Petitjean finished in 68th place in her only race out of 75 competitors, nearly ten minutes behind the winner Justyna Kowalczyk of Poland. Petitjean hopes that her appearance will help to inspire the youth of Africa to participate in winter sports.

Petitjean was born in Togo, to a Togolese mother which allowed her the opportunity to compete for the country. She was contacted by Togolese Ski Federation in March 2013 via Facebook to compete for the country at the Winter Olympics. Petitjean has lived the majority of her life in Haute-Savoie, France, where she learned to ski.

She carried the Togolese flag at the opening ceremony. She competed for France until her switch to compete for Togo.

== Cross-country skiing results ==
All results are sourced from the International Ski Federation (FIS).

=== Olympic Games ===
Year	Age	10 km individual	15 km skiathlon	30 km mass start	Sprint	4 × 5 km relay	Team sprint
2014	20	66	—	—	—	—	—
2018	24	83	—	—	59	—	—

=== World Championships ===
Year	Age	10 km individual	15 km skiathlon	30 km mass start	Sprint	4 × 5 km relay	Team sprint
2017	23	—	—	—	49	—	—

=== World Cup ===
==== Season standings ====
Season	Age	Discipline standings			Ski Tour standings			
Season	Age	Overall	Distance	Sprint	Nordic Opening	Tour de Ski	World Cup Final	Ski Tour Canada
2016	22	NC	NC	NC	—	—	—N/a	DNF
2017	23	NC	—	NC	—	—	DNF	—N/a
2018	24	NC	NC	NC	—	—	—	—N/a

== See also ==
- Togo at the 2014 Winter Olympics
- Togo at the 2018 Winter Olympics

Olympic Games
Preceded by Benjamin Boukpeti	Flag bearer for Togo; 2014 Sochi	Succeeded by Adzo Kpossi
