= Duan Jingli =

Chinese rower (born 1989)

Personal information
- Nationality: Chinese
- Born: 8 March 1989 (age 37)

Sport
- Sport: Rowing
Medal record
Women's rowing
Representing China
Olympic Games
Bronze medal – third place	2016 Rio de Janeiro	Single sculls
World Championships
Bronze medal – third place	2014 Amsterdam	Single sculls
Bronze medal – third place	2015 Aiguebelette	Single sculls

Duan Jingli (born 8 March 1989) is a Chinese competitive rower.

Duan was born in 1989. Initially a volleyball player, she did not grow tall enough to make China's national team and on advice by her parents, she took up rowing in 2003 instead.

Duan competes in the single sculls. She first competed at World Championship level in 2010 on Lake Karapiro in New Zealand, where she came in eights place. She won a bronze medal at the 2014 World Rowing Championships at Bosbaan, Amsterdam in the Netherlands. At the 2015 World Rowing Championships at Lac d'Aiguebelette, Aiguebelette in France, she achieved the same result.

She competed at the 2016 Summer Olympics in Rio de Janeiro, in the women's single sculls, and again won bronze. She was portrayed as FISA's Athlete of the Month in October 2017.

Duan got engaged during 2017.
