= Chierika Ukogu =

Nigerian rower (born 1992)

Personal information
- Nickname: Coco
- National team: Nigeria
- Born: 2 October 1992 (age 33) Philadelphia, U.S
- Education: Stanford University; Icahn School of Medicine at Mount Sinai
- Occupation: sculler
- Years active: 2012–2016

Sport
- Country: Nigeria
- Sport: Rowing
- Women's single sculls: Sculling
- Updated on 16:07, 24 July 2016 (UTC)

Chierika "Coco" Ukogu (born 2 October 1992) is an American-born Nigerian professional rower. During the 2015 FISA African Olympic Qualification Regatta, she qualified to represent Nigeria at the 2016 Summer Olympics in Rio de Janeiro, Brazil, making her the first Nigerian to achieve such feat. In order to compete in Rio, she raised $15,000 through her GoFundMe page and went on to reach the semi-finals C/D, a non-medal contention round; after placing 5th in her group.
