= Fie Udby Erichsen =

Danish rower (born 1985)

Personal information
- Born: 23 April 1985 (age 41) Hobro, Mariagerfjord, Denmark
- Height: 184 cm (6 ft 0 in)
- Weight: 79 kg (174 lb)
Medal record
Women's rowing
Representing Denmark
Olympic Games
Silver medal – second place	2012 London	Single sculls

Fie Udby Erichsen (born 23 April 1985) is a Danish rower. She set the indoor rowing world record for female rowers in the under 12 years old category in 1998 with a time of 7:30.3. She won the silver medal in the single sculls at the 2012 Summer Olympics.

Erichsen competed for Denmark at the 2016 Summer Olympics, finish 9th in the women's single sculls event. She also competed for Denmark at the 2020 Summer Olympics, finish 8th in the women's coxless pair event.
