= Dodji Fanny =

Togolese table tennis player (born 1987)

Kokou Dodji Fanny (born 17 April 1987 in Lomé) is a Togolese table tennis player. He represented Togo at the 2020 Summer Olympics and was one of the Togolese flag bearers at the Parade of Nations.

== Career ==
Fanny lost four sets to nil to Andrej Gacina in the first round of the men's singles table tennis at the 2020 Summer Olympics.

Olympic Games
Preceded by Adzo Kpossi	Flag bearer for Togo; Tokyo 2020 with Claire Ayivon	Succeeded by Eloi Adjavon; Naomi Akakpo
