= Elza Gulbe =

Latvian rower

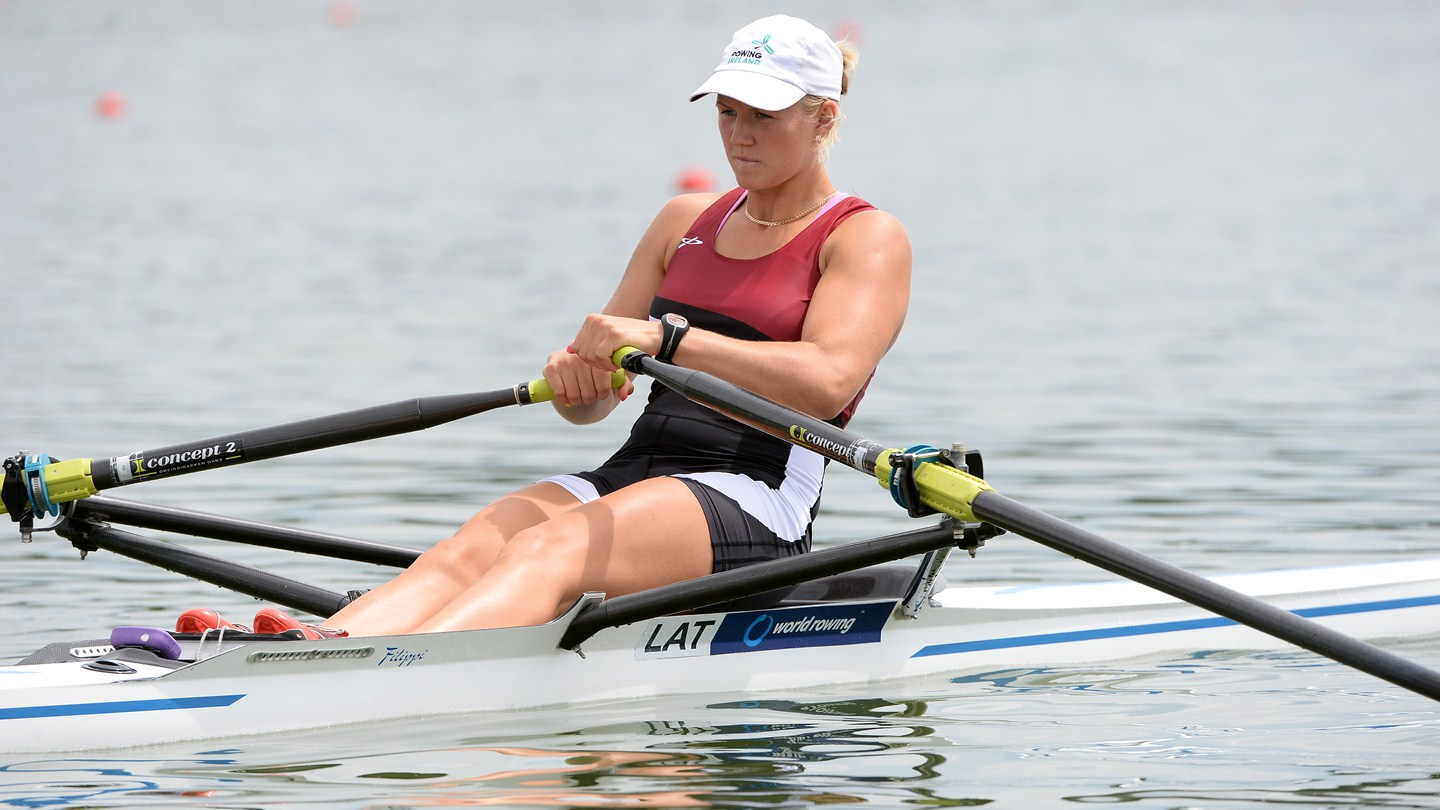

Personal information
- Born: 13 June 1993 (age 33) Vāne Parish, Latvia

Sport
- Sport: Rowing
Medal record
Representing Latvia
World Junior Championships
Bronze medal – third place	2011 Dorney	Single sculls
European Championships
Silver medal – second place	2016 Brandenburg	Single sculls
Summer Universiade
Bronze medal – third place	2013 Kazan	Single sculls

Elza Gulbe (born 13 June 1993) is a Latvian rower. She is a World Junior bronze medalist and European silver medalist in the single sculls.
