= Togo at the 1984 Summer Olympics =

- IOC code: TOG
- NOC: Comité National Olympique Togolais

in Los Angeles
- Competitors: 6 in 2 sports
- Flag bearer: Denou Koffi
- Medals: Gold 0 Silver 0 Bronze 0 Total 0

Summer Olympics appearances (overview)
- 1972; 1976–1980; 1984; 1988; 1992; 1996; 2000; 2004; 2008; 2012; 2016; 2020; 2024

Togo competed at the 1984 Summer Olympics in Los Angeles, United States. The nation returned to the Olympic Games after missing both the 1976 and 1980 Games. It was the nation's second time at the Olympics.

== Athletics ==
Men
Track & road events

| Athlete | Event | Heat | | Quarterfinal | | Semifinal | | Final | |
| Athlete | Event | Result | Rank | Result | Rank | Result | Rank | Result | Rank |
|---|---|---|---|---|---|---|---|---|---|
| Adjé Adjeoda Vignon | 400 m | 47.43 | 6 | did not advance | | | | | |

Field events

| Athlete | Event | Qualification | | Final | |
| Athlete | Event | Distance | Position | Distance | Position |
|---|---|---|---|---|---|
| Bilanday Bodjona | Long jump | 6.82 | 26 | did not advance | |
| Denou Koffi | Triple jump | 14.44 | 26 | did not advance | |

== Boxing ==
Men

| Athlete | Event | 1 Round | 2 Round | 3 Round | Quarterfinals | Semifinals | Final | |
| Athlete | Event | Opposition Result | Opposition Result | Opposition Result | Opposition Result | Opposition Result | Opposition Result | Rank |
|---|---|---|---|---|---|---|---|---|
| Yao Gaitor | Bantamweight | Jarmo Eskelinen (FIN); L 0-5 | did not advance | | | | | |
| Avi Sodogah | Featherweight | BYE | Mohamed Hegazy (EGY); L 0-5 | did not advance | | | | |
| Ama Sodogah | Lightweight | BYE | Geoffrey Nyeko (UGA); L 0-5 | did not advance | | | | |
