= Jan Sekpona =

Togolese middle-distance runner

Personal information
- Nationality: Togo
- Born: 20 June 1987 (age 39) Lomé, Togo
- Height: 1.70 m (5 ft 7 in)
- Weight: 61 kg (134 lb)

Sport
- Sport: Athletics
- Event: Middle distance running

Achievements and titles
- Personal best: 800 m: 1:52.40 (2008)

Jan Sekpona (born 20 June 1987, in Lomé) is a retired Togolese middle-distance runner, who specialized in the 800 metres. Sekpona qualified for the Togolese squad in the men's 800 metres at the 2004 Summer Olympics in Athens by attaining an entry time and a personal best of 1:52.40. Running against seven other athletes in heat three, Sekpona crossed the finish line by nearly ten minutes behind leader Wilson Kipketer of Denmark with an eighth-place time in 1:54.25. Sekpona failed to advance into the semifinals as he placed farther from two automatic slots for the next round and ranked no. 70 overall in the prelims. Sekpona was also appointed as the Togolese flag bearer by the National Olympic Committee (French: Comité National Olympique Togolais) in the opening ceremony.

== 2004 Summer Olympics ==
=== Racing ===
Sekpona's qualifying time for the men's 800m race was 1:52.40 (a personal best). He qualified through the use of wildcard places, since their season best time fell outside of the "B" qualifying standards.

Sekpona's heat time for the men's 800m race was 1:54.25 (eighth place in an eight-person heat). The heat winner, Wilson Kipketer of Denmark, finished nearly ten minutes quicker. Sekpona finished behind Bosnia and Herzegovina's Jasmin Salihović (1:49.59), Jean-Patrick Nduwimana from Burundi (1:45.38) and Brazil's Osmar dos Santos (1:45.90), who each advanced to the semifinals.

Sekpona failed to advance into the semifinals. He was ranked no. 70 overall in the prelims.

=== Flag bearer ===
Sekpona was the Togolese flag bearer in the opening ceremony, appointed by the National Olympic Committee (French: Comité National Olympique Togolais).

=== Youngest competitor ===
At just 17, Sekpona was one of the youngest in history to compete in the men's 800m race at the Olympics. Along with Ali Mohamed Al-Balooshi of UAE and Majed Saeed Sultan of QAT, the 2004 heats featured three of the six youngest competitors to attempt 800m at an Olympic level.

=== Team ===
In 2004 Togo entered a team of three into the Olympics, two track and field athletes and a single canoeist; Jan Sekpona in the men's 800 metres, Sandrine Thiébaud-Kangni in the women's 400 metres, and Benjamin Boukpeti in the men's K-1. The 2004 Togo team did not win any medals.

The country's participation at Athens marked its seventh appearance in the Summer Olympics since its debut at the 1972 Summer Games in Munich, West Germany.

Togo did not win their first medal until Benjamin Boukpeti at the 2008 Summer Olympics in Beijing, China. They have never had more than seven participants in any one Games.

Olympic Games
| Preceded by Kouami Sacha Denanyoh | Flag bearer for Togo; 2004 Athens | Succeeded by Benjamin Boukpeti |
