= Emily Morley =

Bahamian rower

Emily Morley (born December 6, 1993) is a Bahamian rower who competed at the 2016 Summer Olympics held in Rio de Janeiro, Brazil.

== Personal life ==
Morley is from Nassau, Bahamas and studied at Ithaca College in Ithaca, New York, United States. She grew up in the Bahamas until the age of fifteen when she moved to attend boarding school at the Emma Willard School in Troy, New York. Her father David Morley is a swimmer who competed for the Bahamas at the 1984 Summer Olympics.

== Rowing ==
She took up rowing while at Emma Willard after friends encouraged her to try out for the crew team. She rowed throughout her time at high school and was a team captain as a senior.

In 2014, she took up sculling. At Ithaca she is coached by Becky Robinson and sculling coach Beth Greene. In 2015, she finished third in the women’s double at the head of the Schyulkill event in Philadelphia. Alongside her doubles partner Jennie Peterson she then placed fourth at the small boat collegiate championships held at Mercer Lake, New Jersey.

In November 2015 she started a new training programme with the aim of qualifying for the 2016 Summer Olympics in Rio de Janeiro, Brazil. In March 2016 attended the 2016 FISA America’s Olympic Qualification Regatta held at Laguna de Curauma in Valparaíso, Chile. In order to qualify for the Olympics she needed to finish in the top six of the W1x (women’s single sculls) event. She failed to qualify directly to the semifinals from her heat, and had to take part in the repechage in which she finished second. She finished fifth in her semifinal and progressed to the B Final, in which she finished fourth, to take tenth position overall. She was later granted a wildcard qualification position for the women's single sculls in Rio by the World Rowing Federation after a qualified athlete did not take up her place, making Morley the first Bahamian rower to qualify for the Olympic Games.
