= Togo at the 1988 Summer Olympics =

- IOC code: TOG
- NOC: Comité National Olympique Togolais

in Seoul
- Competitors: 6 in 2 sports
- Flag bearer: Akossi Gnalo
- Medals: Gold 0 Silver 0 Bronze 0 Total 0

Summer Olympics appearances (overview)
- 1972; 1976–1980; 1984; 1988; 1992; 1996; 2000; 2004; 2008; 2012; 2016; 2020; 2024

Togo competed at the 1988 Summer Olympics in Seoul, South Korea. It was their third appearance at the Olympics, after debuting in 1972 and missing the Olympic Games from 1976-1980.

== Competitors ==
The following is the list of number of competitors in the Games.

Sport	Men	Women	Total
Athletics	3	0	3
Boxing	3	–	3
Total	6	0	6

== Athletics ==
Men
Track & road events

Athlete	Event	Heat		Quarterfinal		Semifinal		Final	
Athlete	Event	Result	Rank	Result	Rank	Result	Rank	Result	Rank
Akossi Gnalo	400 m	51.46	6	did not advance					
Boevi Lawson	100 m	10.59	5	did not advance					

Field events

Athlete	Event	Qualification		Final	
Athlete	Event	Distance	Position	Distance	Position
Toyi Simklina	Triple jump	13.92	41	did not advance	

== Boxing ==
Men

Athlete	Event	1 Round	2 Round	3 Round	Quarterfinals	Semifinals	Final	
Athlete	Event	Opposition Result	Opposition Result	Opposition Result	Opposition Result	Opposition Result	Opposition Result	Rank
Ayewoubo Akomatsri	Bantamweight	BYE	Shahuraj Birajdor (IND); L 0-5	did not advance				
Anoumou Aguiar	Light-Welterweight	Jonas Bade (PNG); W DSQ-2	Anthony Mwamba (ZAM); L RSC-1	did not advance				
Abdoukerim Hamidou	Welterweight	BYE	Francisc Vaştag (ROU) 'W 'DSQ-3	Khristo Furnigov (BUL); L 0-5	did not advance			
