= Togo at the 1972 Summer Olympics =

- IOC code: TOG
- NOC: Comité National Olympique Togolais

in Munich
- Competitors: 7 in 3 sports
- Flag bearer: Roger Kangni
- Medals: Gold 0 Silver 0 Bronze 0 Total 0

Summer Olympics appearances (overview)
- 1972; 1976–1980; 1984; 1988; 1992; 1996; 2000; 2004; 2008; 2012; 2016; 2020; 2024

Togo competed in the Olympic Games for the first time at the 1972 Summer Olympics in Munich, West Germany. Seven competitors, all men, took part in five events in three sports.

== Athletics ==
Men
Track & road events

Athlete	Event	Heat		Quarterfinal		Semifinal		Final	
Athlete	Event	Result	Rank	Result	Rank	Result	Rank	Result	Rank
Roger Kangni	800 m	1:52.1	7	did not advance					

Field events

Athlete	Event	Qualification		Final	
Athlete	Event	Distance	Position	Distance	Position
Martin Adouna	Long jump	7.25	31	did not advance	

== Boxing ==
Men

Athlete	Event	1 Round	2 Round	3 Round	Quarterfinals	Semifinals	Final	
Athlete	Event	Opposition Result	Opposition Result	Opposition Result	Opposition Result	Opposition Result	Opposition Result	Rank
Guy Segbaya	Featherweight	BYE	Salah Mohamed Amin (EGY); L 0–5	did not advance				
Kolman Kalipe	Welterweight	Jesse Valdez (USA); L 0–5	did not advance					

== Cycling ==
Three cyclists represented Togo in 1972.

=== Road ===
Athlete	Event	Time	Rank
Gbedikpe Emmanuel Amouzou	Men's road race	DNF	
Charles Leodo	Men's road race	DNF	
Tompson Mensah	Men's road race	DNF	
