= Kim Ye-ji (rower) =

South Korean rower (born 1994)

Kim Ye-Ji (Korean: 김예지; born 17 November 1994) is a South Korean rower. She competed in the single sculls race at the 2012 Summer Olympics and placed 1st in Final D and 19th overall. She also competed in the 2016 Summer Olympics.
