= Alessia Dipol =

Italian-Togolese alpine skier (born 1995)

Personal information
- Full name: Alessia Afi Dipol
- Born: 1 August 1995 (age 31) Pieve di Cadore, Veneto, Italy
- Height: 168 cm (5 ft 6 in)

Skiing career
- Sport: Alpine skiing
- Club: Scuola Sci Cortina
- Disciplines: Slalom, giant slalom
- World Cup debut: 6 January 2018 (age 22)

Olympics
- Teams: 1 – (2014)
- Medals: 0

World Cup
- Seasons: 1 – (2018)
- Wins: 0
Medal record
Women's alpine skiing
Representing Togo

Alessia Afi Dipol (born 1 August 1995) is an Italian-Togolese alpine skier who competed for Togo at the Sochi 2014 Winter Olympics in the slalom and giant slalom. Dipol also originally competed for India between 2011 and 2013, but she later switched to compete for Togo even though she has no familial connections to the country, so she could qualify to compete at the 2014 Winter Olympics. She also chose to represent the country because her father owns a clothing factory in Togo.

== Personal life ==
Dipol was born in Pieve di Cadore, Belluno to Italian parents in the region of Veneto in Italy and lives with her family in San Vito di Cadore. She attended the Liceo Linguistico Europeo school in Auronzo di Cadore.

Dipol works as a ski instructor for the Italian ski club Scuola Sci Cortina.

== Career ==
=== Italy ===
Dipol started her youth career while registered with the Italian Winter Sports Federation between 2009 and 2010.

=== India ===
Dipol joined the Winter Games Federation of India making her debut for India in 2011. She took part in FIS competitions and the Italian Championships representing India until 2013.

=== Togo ===
Dipol decided to compete as part of Togo's first Winter Olympics team at the 2014 Winter Olympics at Sochi. Although she has no family ties to Togo, Dipol became a naturalized citizen in order to take part in the Winter Olympics.

Dipol on making her debut for the Togo national team:

My father has a factory in Togo that specialises in sports clothes. He has a feeling for the nation, and I have an opportunity to run for Togo, and I am proud of this. Even though I was born in Italy and I live and train in Italy, now I will always stay with Togo, which is like a new family that has adopted me.

On 18 February Dipol finished the giant slalom race in 55th position out of 74 competitors who finished, with a total time of 3 minutes 2.80 seconds. She did not finish the slalom race after starting the first run. She carried the Togolese flag at the closing ceremony.

She also participated in 2015 FIS Alpine Ski Europa Cup and 2018 FIS Alpine Ski World Cup.

== Alpine skiing results ==
All results are sourced from the International Ski Federation (FIS).

=== Olympic results ===
Year
Year	Age	Slalom	Giant; Slalom	Super-G	Downhill	Combined	Team Event
2014	18	DNF	55	—	—	—	—

=== World Cup results ===
Season
Season	Age	Overall	Slalom	Giant; Slalom	Super G	Downhill	Combined
2018	22	NC	DNF1	DNF1	—	—	—

=== European Cup results ===
Season	Age	Overall	Slalom	Giant Slalom	Super-G	Downhill	Combined
2015	19	—	—	DNF1	—	—	—

== See also ==
- Togo at the 2014 Winter Olympics
