= Claire Ayivon =

Togolese competitive rower (born 1996)

Personal information
- Nationality: Togolese
- Born: 11 August 1996 (age 29) Togoville, Togo

Sport
- Sport: Rowing

Claire Akossiwa Ayivon (born 11 August 1996) is a Togolese competitive rower.

She competed at the 2016 Summer Olympics in Rio de Janeiro, in the women's single sculls.

She represented Togo at the 2020 Summer Olympics.

Olympic Games
Preceded by Adzo Kpossi	Flag bearer for Togo; Tokyo 2020 with Dodji Fanny	Succeeded by Eloi Adjavon; Naomi Akakpo
