= Franck Amégnigan =

Togolese sprinter (born 1971)

Koukou Franck Amégnigan (born 16 June 1971) is a former Togolese sprinter who competed in the men's 100m competition at the 1996 Summer Olympics. He recorded a 10.51, not enough to qualify for the next round past the heats. His personal best is 10.30, set in 1996. He was also a part of the Togolese men's 4 × 100 m relay team in both the 1992 and 1996 Olympics. The team finished 7th and 5th in their first heats, respectively.
