= Kouami Sacha Denanyoh =

Togolese judoka (born 1979)

Personal information
- Born: 29 September 1979 (age 45)
- Occupation: Judoka
- Height: 1.76 m (5 ft 9 1/2 in)
- Weight: 81 kg (179 lb)

Sport
- Country: Togo
- Sport: Judo
- Event: -81kg

Profile at external databases
- JudoInside.com: 12819
- Updated on 23 July 2012

Kouami Sacha Denanyoh (born 29 September 1979) is a Togolese judoka. He competed at the 2000 Summer Olympics, the 2008 Summer Olympics, and the 2012 Summer Olympics. At the 2008 Summer Olympics, he was choked unconscious with a clock choke by Sherali Bozorov in the preliminaries.

At the 2012 Summer Olympics, he lost in the second round to Islam Bozbayev.

He is now a teacher in a high school Gymnase intercantonal de la Broye and also gives judo classes for the University of Fribourg.

== Achievements ==
Year	Tournament	Place	Weight class
2007	All-Africa Games	7th	Half middleweight (81 kg)

Olympic Games
Preceded by Boevi Lawson	Flag bearer for Togo; 2000 Sydney	Succeeded by Jan Sekpona
