= Pieve di Cadore =

Comune in Veneto, Italy

- Comune
- Comune di Pieve di Cadore
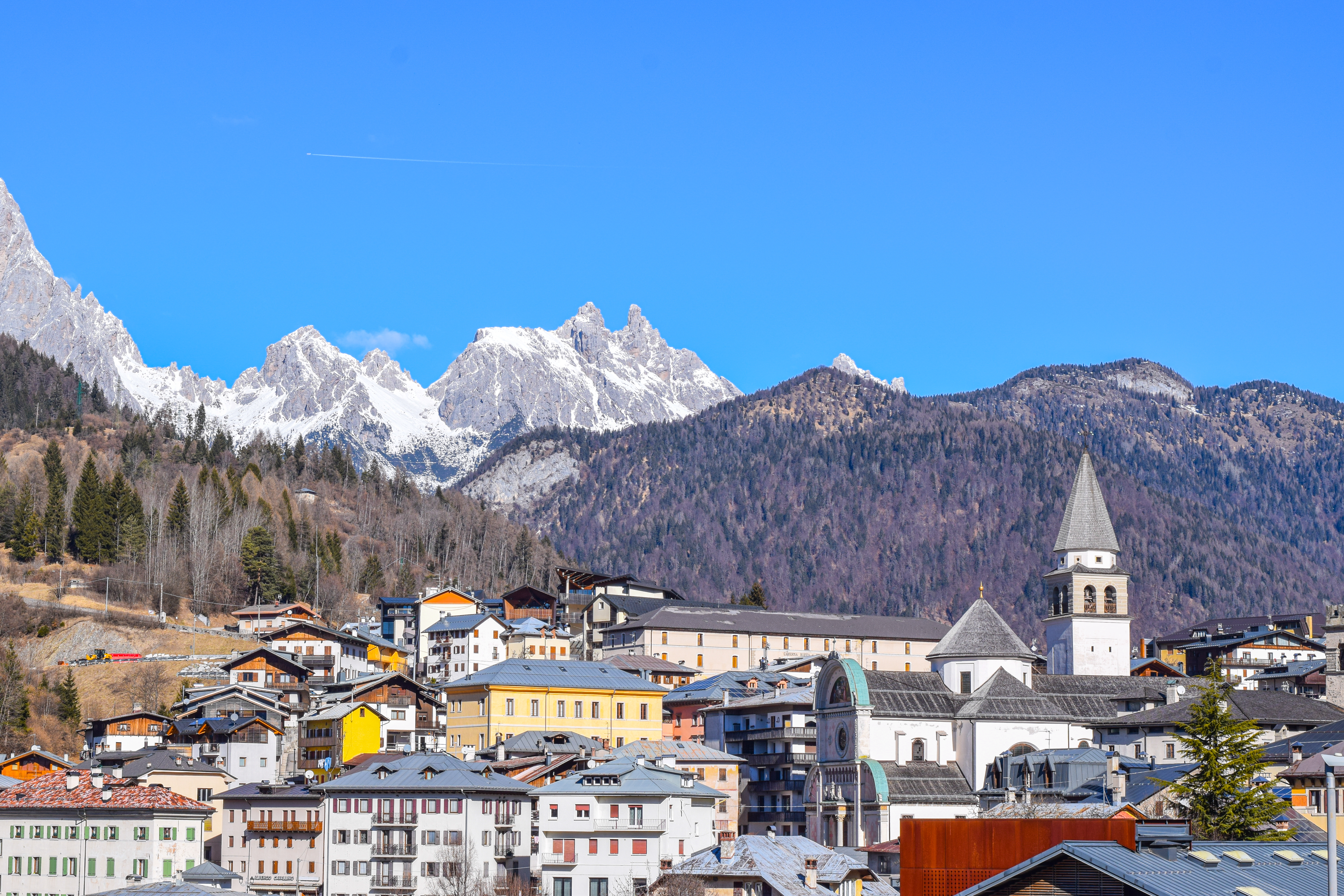

- Coat of arms

- Location within Italy Location within Veneto
- Coordinates: 46°26′N 12°22′E
- Country: Italy
- Region: Veneto
- Province: Belluno (BL)
- Frazioni: Damos, Nebbiù, Pozzale, Sottocastello, Tai

Government
  - Mayor: Sindi Manushi

Area
  - Total: 66.6 km^{2} (25.7 sq mi)
- Elevation: 878 m (2,881 ft)

Population (31 December 2016)
  - Total: 3,796
  - Density: 57.0/km^{2} (148/sq mi)
- Demonym: Pievani
- Time zone: UTC+1 (CET)
  - Summer (DST): UTC+2 (CEST)
- Postal code: 32044
- Dialing code: 0435
- Patron saint: Nativity of the Virgin
- Saint day: September 8
- Website: Official website

Pieve di Cadore is a comune (municipality) in the province of Belluno in the Italian region of Veneto, about 110 kilometres (68 miles) north of Venice and about 35 km (22 miles) northeast of Belluno. "Pieve" means "Parish church". It is the birthplace of the Italian painter Titian; the house where he was born remains largely intact, and is a small museum.

With its strategic location, the town was a medieval stronghold with fortifications, called the "walled city of the Veneto." The main sight is the Palazzo della Magnifica Comunità ("Palace of the Magnificent Community"), built in 1447 by the eponymous council which then ruled the city. It has a merloned tower which was completed in 1491.

== History ==
Pieve di Cadore is in Alpine forest country, very close to the border with Austria. As part of the terrafirma or mainland territories of the Republic of Venice, it was important for its timber, needed both for domestic Venetian architecture and the large Venetian navy. By the Renaissance, mature pines for ship masts were becoming scarce.

Titian's family were in timber, like most of the population. Sheila Hale describes the house where he was born as "a modest cottage of a kind that has mostly disappeared, it was rediscovered behind a later extension in the early nineteenth century by scholar detectives who identified it from its description in a sale document of 1580.

== Transport ==
A highway, SS51, connects the town with other communities in the Cadore Dolomite region.

== Sport and tourism ==
=== Sport facilities ===
The town has a swimming pool, tennis club, ice hockey arena, a bocce stadium, soccer fields and a bike path called Ciclabile delle Dolomiti offering views of the neighbourhood.

=== Giro d'Italia ===
The route of the 2013 Giro d'Italia passed through Calalzo di Cadore during Stage 11.

== Notable people ==
- Titian - Renaissance painter, born in Pieve di Cadore (c.1488-1576)
- Lisa Vittozzi - biathlete
- Luca De Carlo - politician
- Alessia Dipol - Italian-born naturalized Togolese alpine skier
- Stefania Constantini – Italian Olympic curler
- Giulia Zardini Lacedelli – curler
- Manuel Gava - politician

== Gallery ==
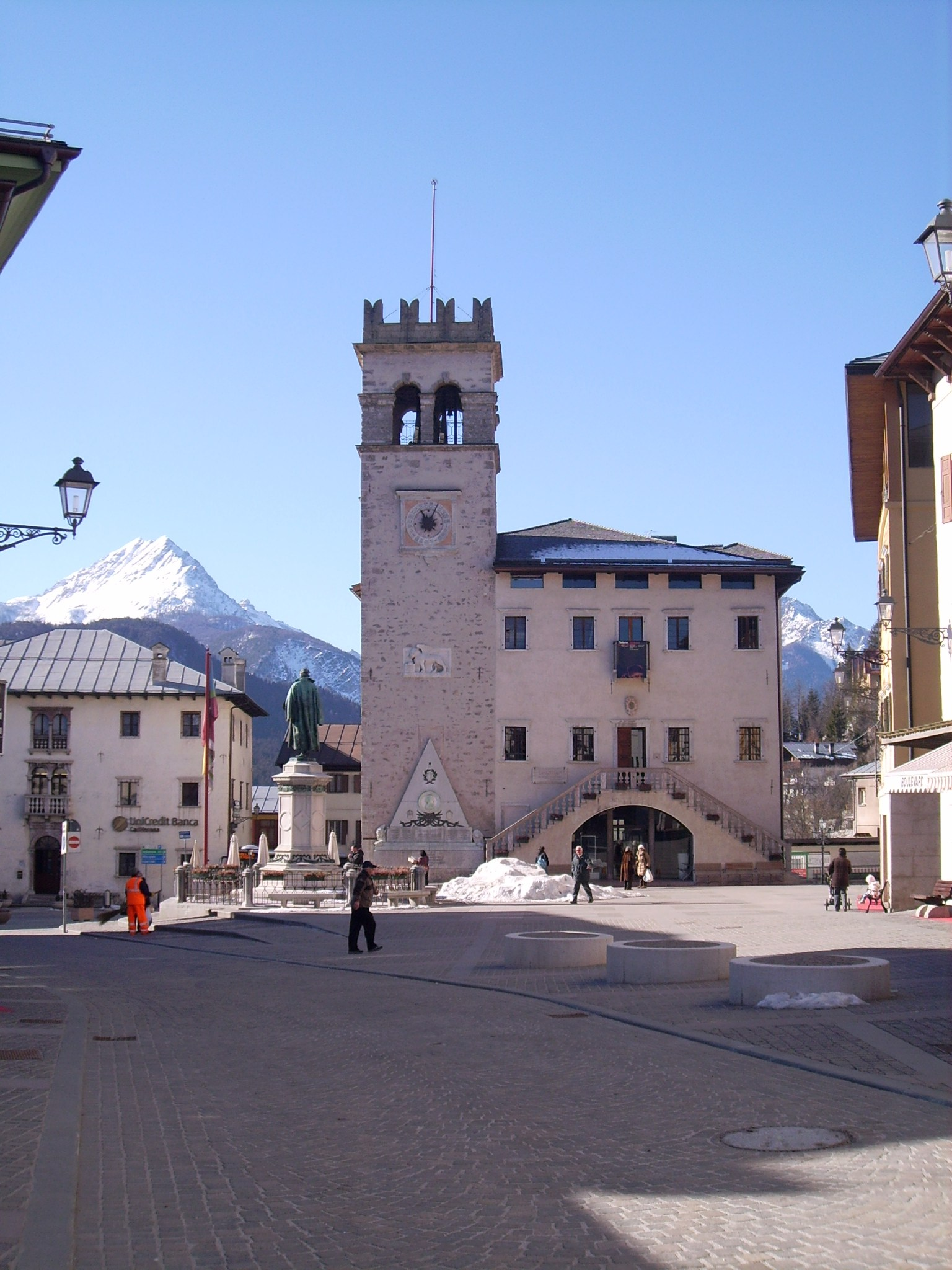
The piazza

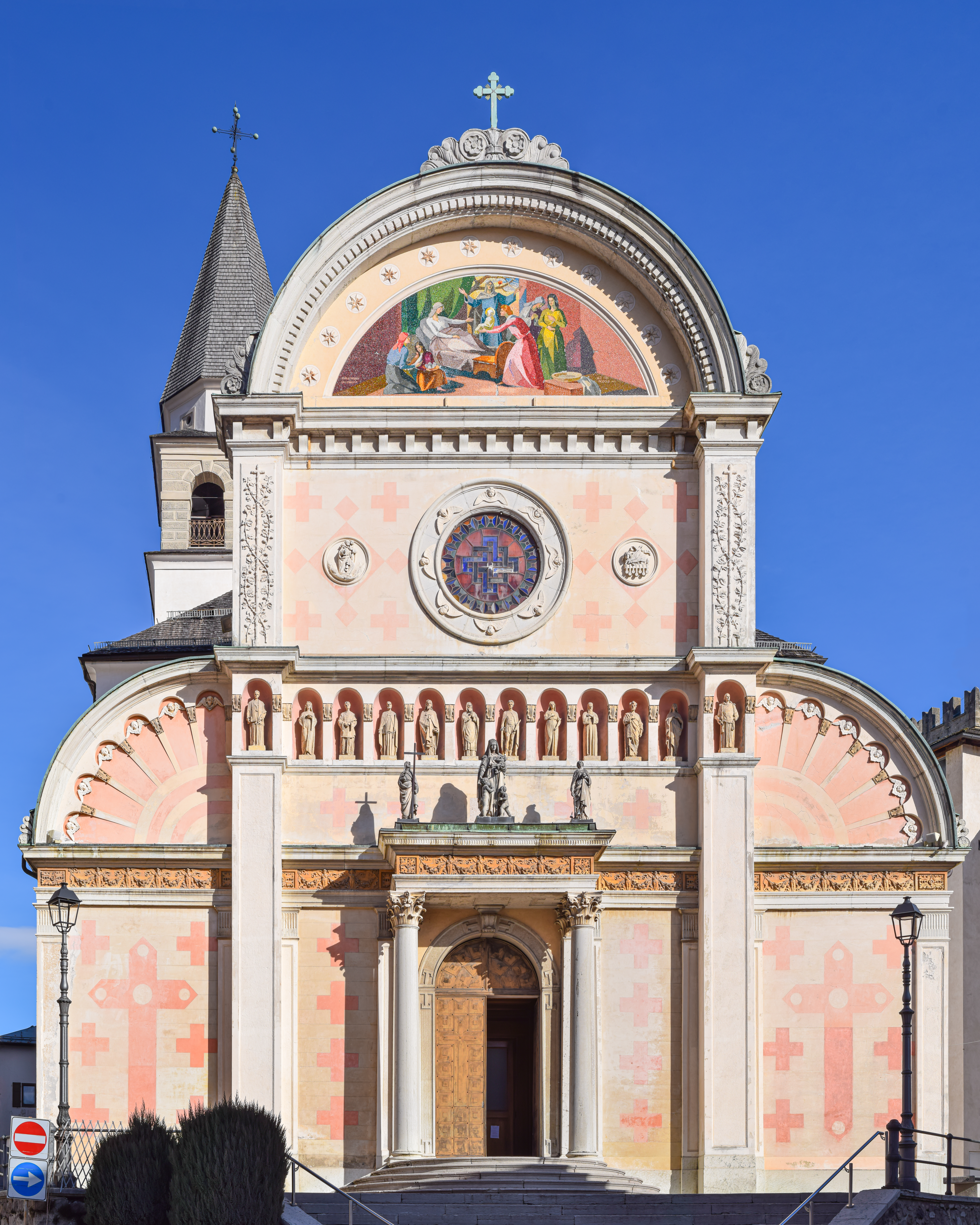
Chiesa di Santa Maria Nascente
