= Roger Kangni =

Togolese middle-distance runner (1944–2021)

Personal information
- Nationality: Togolese
- Born: 1944
- Died: 10 September 2021 (aged 77)

Sport
- Sport: Middle-distance running
- Event: 800 metres

Roger Messau Kangni (1944 – 10 September 2021) was a Togolese middle-distance runner. He competed in the men's 800 metres at the 1972 Summer Olympics.
