= Togolese National Olympic Committee =

National Olympic Committee

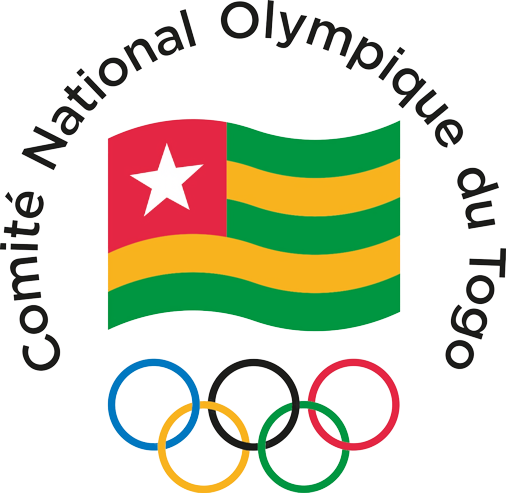
- Country: Togo
- Code: TOG
- Created: 1963
- Recognized: 1965
- Continental Association: ANOCA
- President: Deladem Akpaki
- Secretary General: Essossannéyou N’dadiya
- Website: cnodutogo.org

The Togolese National Olympic Committee (French: Comité National Olympique du Togo) (IOC code: TOG) is the National Olympic Committee representing Togo.
