= Benjamin Boukpeti =

French-born Togolese slalom canoeist

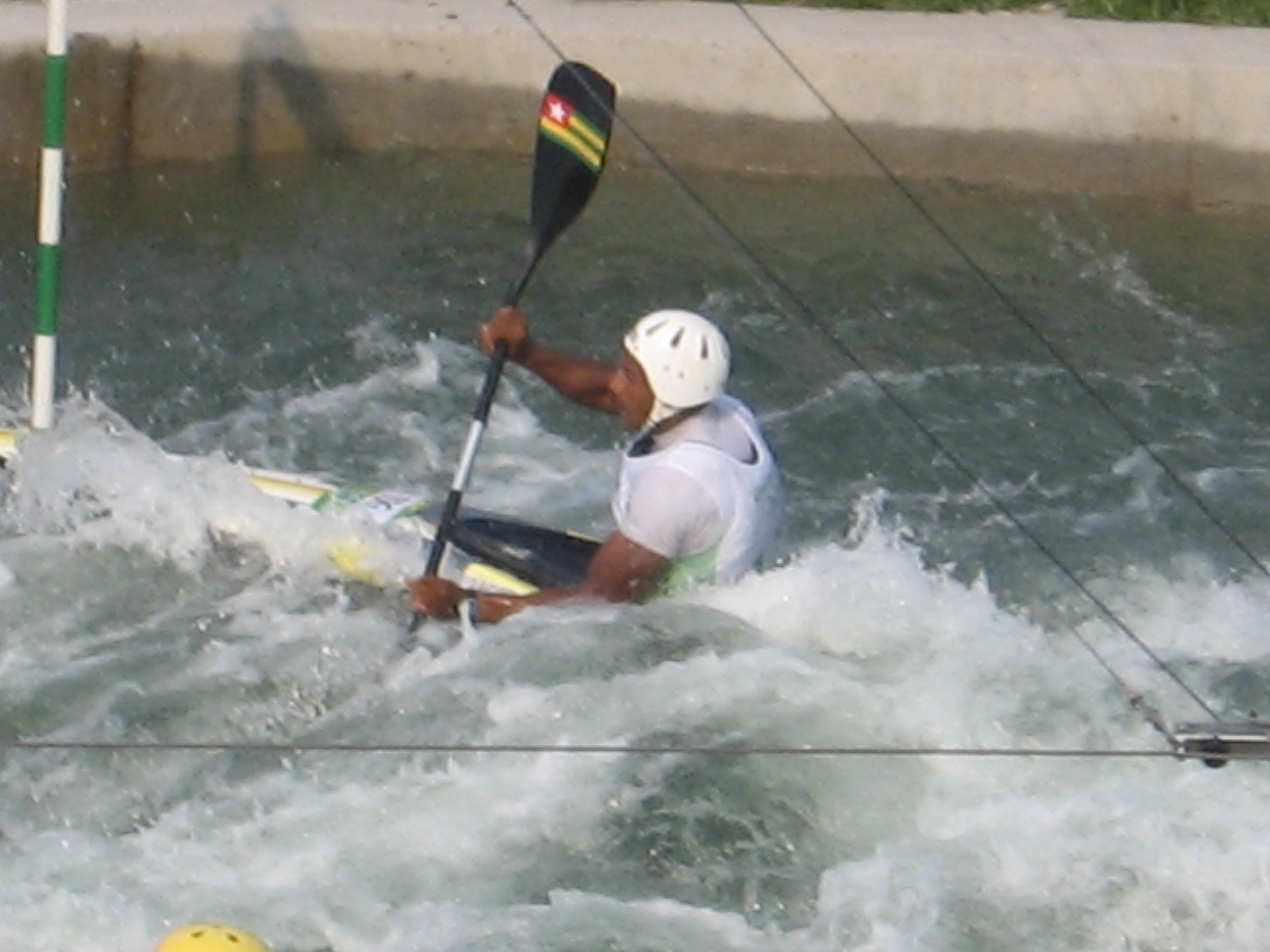
- Benjamin Boukpeti in 2008

Personal information
- Full name: Benjamin Kudjow Thomas Boukpeti
- Nickname: Bouk
- Citizenship: France / Togo
- Born: August 4, 1981 (age 44) Lagny-sur-Marne, France
- Height: 1.77 m (5 ft 9 1/2 in)
- Weight: 76 kg (168 lb)

Sport
- Country: Togo
- Sport: Canoe slalom
- Event: K1
- Coached by: Jean-Jérôme Perrin

Achievements and titles
- Olympic finals: 2004 K1, 15th; 2008 K1, Bronze; 2012 K1, 10th
Medal record
Men's canoe slalom
Representing Togo
Olympic Games
Bronze medal – third place	2008 Beijing	K1

Benjamin Kudjow Thomas Boukpeti (born August 4, 1981) is a French-born Togolese slalom canoeist who competed at the international level from 2003 to 2012. Competing in three Summer Olympics, Boukpeti won a bronze medal in the K1 event in Beijing in 2008, and remains Togo's first and only Olympic medalist.

== Early life ==
Born in Lagny-sur-Marne, France to a French mother, he holds dual Togolese-French citizenship and chose to represent Togo, the country of his father, in Olympic competition. He began kayaking at age 10. His elder brother Olivier is a member of the French flatwater canoeing team.

== Canoeing career ==
Competing in the 2004 Olympics in Athens, Greece, he placed fifteenth in the first heat of the Men's K1 event to become the first Togolese to reach an Olympic semifinal, but only ranked eighteenth in the semifinal run and did not advance to the final.

In January 2008, Boukpeti placed first at the African Championships.

In the 2008 Olympics in Beijing, China, Boukpeti led after the semifinal, eventually claiming the Bronze medal in the K1 event, the first ever Olympic medal for Togo. After clinching his medal Boukpeti snapped his paddle over his kayak in celebration.

Following his Olympic success, Togolese Olympics fans expressed an interest in meeting him, as he was mostly unknown in Togo, only having visited that nation once, during his childhood.

Boukpeti failed to qualify for the 2012 Summer Olympics in London after he was beaten by Jonathan Akinyemi at the African Championships. However, Boukpeti received a wild card and was able to enter the event. Once again he managed to qualify for the final run of the K1 event where he finished in 10th place.

He recently completed management studies in Toulouse, France, where he lives.

== World Cup individual podiums ==
Season	Date	Venue	Position	Event
2008	27 Jan 2008	Sagana	1st	K1^{1}

^{1} African Championship counting for World Cup points

== Commitment ==
Boukpeti is a member of the 'Champions for Peace' club, a group of more than 90 famous elite created by Peace and Sport, a Monaco-based international organization placed under the High Patronage of H.S.H Prince Albert II. This group of top level champions, wish to make sport a tool for dialogue and social cohesion. http://www.peace-sport.org/our-champions-of-peace/

Olympic Games
Preceded by Jan Sekpona	Flagbearer for Togo; Beijing 2008; London 2012	Succeeded by Mathilde-Amivi Petitjean
