= Mauritania at the 2020 Summer Olympics =

- IOC code: MTN
- NOC: Comité National Mauritanien

in Tokyo, Japan 23 July 2021 – 8 August 2021
- Competitors: 2 in 1 sport
- Flag bearers (opening): Houlèye Ba; Abidine Abidine
- Flag bearer (closing): N/A
- Medals: Gold 0 Silver 0 Bronze 0 Total 0

Summer Olympics appearances (overview)
- 1984; 1988; 1992; 1996; 2000; 2004; 2008; 2012; 2016; 2020; 2024

Mauritania competed at the 2020 Summer Olympics in Tokyo which were held from 23 July to 8 August 2021. Originally scheduled to take place from 24 July to 9 August 2020, the Games were postponed due to the COVID-19 pandemic. It was the nation's tenth appearance at the Summer Olympics since its debut in 1984. The delegation consisted of two athletes, one man and one woman, competing in two athletic events. Sprinters Abidine Abidine and Houlèye Ba represented Mauritania in the men's 5000 metres and women's 800 metres event, respectively. For the first time, in an effort to promote gender equality, two flagbearers, one male and one female were allowed at the Olympics. Abidine and Houlèye lead the Mauritanian squad as the flagbearers in the opening ceremony. As of 2023, Mauritania, however, has yet to win its first ever Olympic medal.

== Background ==
Mauritania, officially the Islamic Republic of Mauritania, is a country located in Northwest Africa between the Atlantic Ocean and Mali. As of 2023 the country had a population of approximately 4,244,878. Formerly a French colony within French West Africa (1904–1960), Mauritania gained independence on 1960. The Mauritanian National Olympic and Sports Committee was formed in 1962, and was recognized by the International Olympic Committee in 1979. Mauritania has participated in every Summer Olympics since its debut in the 1984 Summer Olympics in Los Angeles. The highest number of Mauritanians participating at any single Summer Games was six at the 1988 Games in Seoul, South Korea and the 1992 Games in Barcelona, Spain. As of 2023, no Mauritanian has ever won a medal at the Olympics.

The 2020 Summer Olympics were originally due to be held from 24 July to 9 August 2020, but were delayed to 23 July to 8 August 2021 due to the COVID-19 pandemic. For the 2020 Summer Olympics, Mauritania sent a delegation of two athletes. Sprinter Houlèye Ba, participating in the women's 100 metres was making her second appearance at the Olympic Games having previously competed in the 2016 Summer Olympics in Rio de Janeiro, Brazil. Long distance runner Abidine Abidine, made his Olympics debut competing in the men's 5000 metres event. Houlèye and Abidine were chosen to be the flagbearers for Mauritania during the parade of nations of the opening ceremony. No athletes from Mauritania were present for the closing ceremony due to COVID-19 related protocols that required athletes to leave Japan within 48 hours from completion of their final event.

== Athletics ==
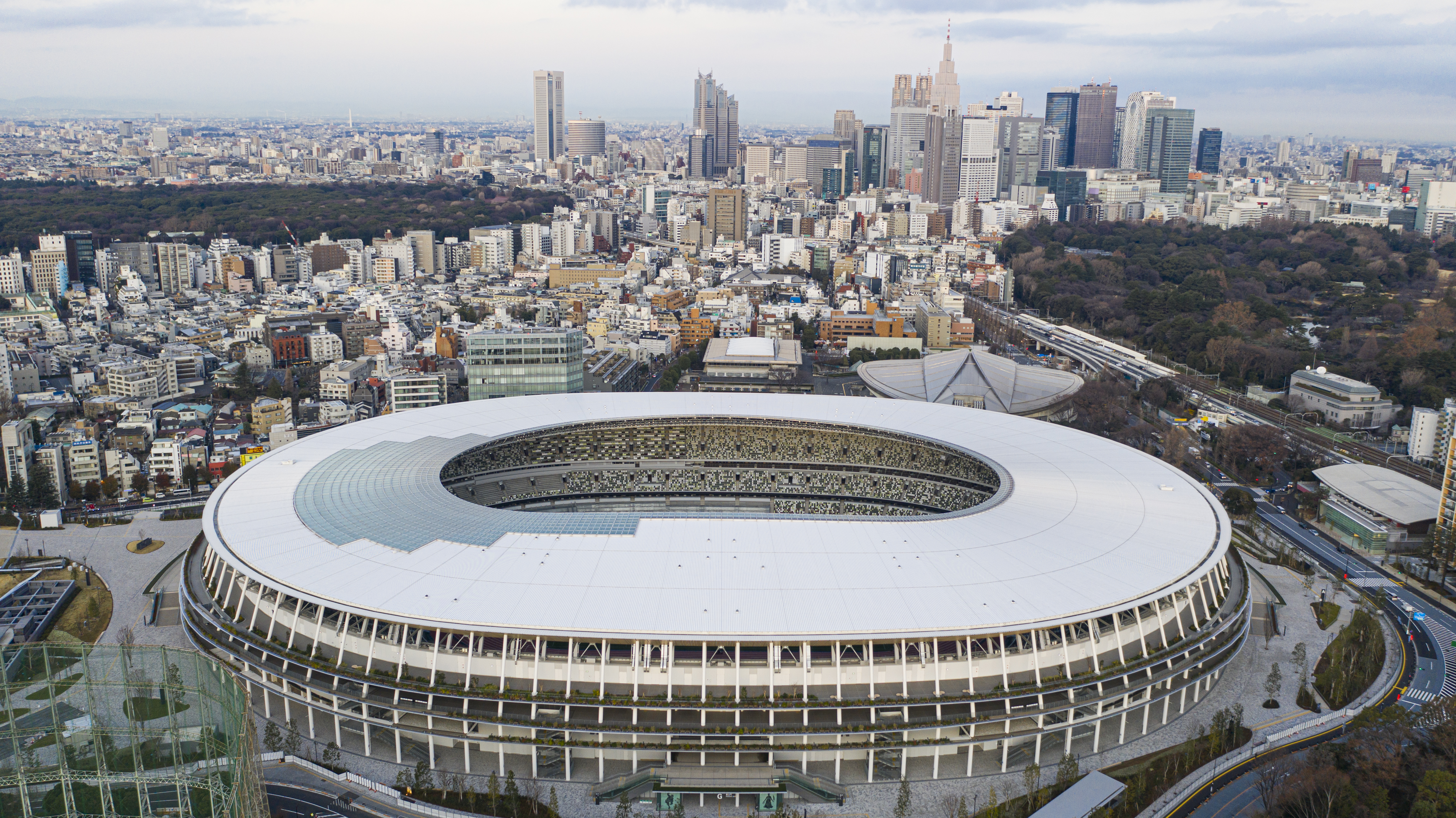
The Japan National Stadium, where the track and field events took place.

Abidine Abidine was 28 years old at the time of these Olympics and was making his first appearance at the games. Abidine competed in the men's 5000 metres event, held on 3 August 2021. He was drawn in heat one in round one. Abidine finished last out of 19 athletes that finished the race with a time of 14 minutes and 54.80 seconds, attaining a personal best but failing to qualify for the final round. (Note: One athlete, Mike Foppen, did not finish.) He finished directly behind Nursultan Keneshbekov of Kyrgyzstan (14 minutes 07.79 seconds). The leaders of Abidine's heat were Kenya's Nicholas Kimeli (13 minutes 38.87 seconds) and eventual silver medalist Mohammed Ahmed of Canada (13 minutes 38.96 seconds). Overall, Abidine placed 37th out of the 40 athletes who participated in the qualification round. (Note: One athlete, Mike Foppen, did not finish. Two athletes, Samwel Masai and Patrick Tiernan, did not start.)

Competing at her second Summer Olympics, Houlèye Ba competed in the women's 100 metres. She had previously competed in the women's 800 metres event at the 2016 Summer Olympics. In the women's 100 metres event held on 30 July 2021, Houlèye was drawn in heat three of the preliminary round. She emerged last from the nine runners in her heat with a time of 15.26. She failed to qualify for the next round but achieved a personal best. Her heat was led by Antigua and Barbuda's Joella Lloyd who finished 3.71 seconds ahead of Houlèye with a time of 11.55 second. The medals from the event went to athletes from Jamaica.

Key

- Note–Ranks given for track events are within the athlete's heat only
- Q = Qualified for the next round
- q = Qualified for the next round as a fastest loser or, in field events, by position without achieving the qualifying target
- NR = National record
- N/A = Round not applicable for the event
- Bye = Athlete not required to compete in round

Track & road events

Athlete	Event	Heat		Quarterfinal		Semifinal		Final	
Athlete	Event	Result	Rank	Result	Rank	Result	Rank	Result	Rank
Abidine Abidine	Men's 5000 m	14:54.80 PB	19	—N/a				Did not advance	
Houlèye Ba	Women's 100 m	15.26 PB	9	Did not advance					

== See also ==
- Mauritania at the Olympics
- List of Mauritanian records in athletics
