= Mauritania at the 2000 Summer Olympics =

- IOC code: MTN
- NOC: Comité National Olympique et Sportif Mauritanien

in Sydney, Australia 15 September – 1 October
- Competitors: 2 in 1 sport
- Flag bearer: Sidi Mohamed Ould Bidjel
- Medals: Gold 0 Silver 0 Bronze 0 Total 0

Summer Olympics appearances (overview)
- 1984; 1988; 1992; 1996; 2000; 2004; 2008; 2012; 2016; 2020; 2024

Mauritania sent a delegation to compete at the 2000 Summer Olympics in Sydney, Australia from 15 September to 1 October 2000. This was the African nation's fifth time competing at the Summer Olympic Games. The Mauritanian delegation consisted of two track and field athletes, Sidi Mohamed Ould Bidjel and Fatou Dieng. Neither advanced beyond the first round of their respective events.

== Background ==
The Comité National Olympique et Sportif Mauritanien (The National Olympic Committee (NOC) of Mauritania) was recognised by the International Olympic Committee on 1 January 1979. Mauritania made their Olympic debut at the 1984 Los Angeles Olympics, and have sent a delegation to every Summer Olympic Games since; they have yet to make their first appearance at the Winter Olympic Games. These Sydney Olympics were the nation's fifth appearance at a Summer Olympiad. The 2000 Summer Olympics were held from 15 September to 1 October 2000; a total of 10,651 athletes represented 199 NOCs. The Mauritanian delegation consisted of two track and field athletes, Sidi Mohamed Ould Bidjel and Fatou Dieng. Ould Bidjel was selected as the flag-bearer for the opening ceremony.

== Competitors ==
The following is the list of number of competitors in the Games.

Sport	Men	Women	Total
Athletics	1	1	2
Total	1	1	2

== Athletics ==
Fatou Dieng was 16 years old at the time of the Sydney Olympics, and was making her only Olympic appearance. She was the first female competitor ever sent to the Olympics by Mauritania. On 23 September, she took part in the first round of the women's 100 metres, and was drawn into heat seven. She finished the race in 13.69 seconds, ninth and last in her heat, and over two seconds behind the heat's winner, Chandra Sturrup of the Bahamas. In the event overall, the gold medal is vacant due to original gold medalist Marion Jones of the United States admitting to steroid use and forfeiting her medals and results from the Sydney Games. Officially, the medals in the event are held by Ekaterini Thanou of Greece and Tayna Lawrence (the original bronze medalist) of Jamaica sharing silver, and Merlene Ottey, also of Jamaica, the original fourth-place finisher, being awarded a bronze. Gold was left vacant because Thanou, the original silver medalist, had her own issue with missing a drug test at the 2004 Summer Olympics

Sidi Mohamed Ould Bidjel was 18 years old at the time of these Games, and was likewise making his only Olympic appearance. On 25 September, he participated in the first round of the men's 1500 metres, and was assigned the third heat. He finished his race in a time of 4 minutes and 3.74 seconds, 14th and last in his heat, and he was eliminated. The gold medal was eventually won in Olympic-record time of 3 minutes and 32.07 seconds by Noah Ngeny of Kenya, the silver medal was earned by Hicham El Guerrouj of Morocco, and the bronze medal was taken by fellow Kenyan Bernard Lagat.

Key

- Note–Ranks given for track events are within the athlete's heat only
- N/A = Round not applicable for the event

Athlete	Event	Heat		Quarterfinal		Semifinal		Final	
Athlete	Event	Result	Rank	Result	Rank	Result	Rank	Result	Rank
Fatou Dieng	Women's 100 m	13.69	9	Did not advance					
Sidi Mohamed Ould Bidjel	Men's 1500 m	4:03.74	14	N/A		Did not advance			

== See also ==
- Mauritania at the 2000 Summer Paralympics
