= Mauritania at the 2016 Summer Olympics =

- IOC code: MTN
- NOC: Comité National Mauritanien

in Rio de Janeiro
- Competitors: 2 in 1 sport
- Flag bearer: Jidou El Moctar
- Medals: Gold 0 Silver 0 Bronze 0 Total 0

Summer Olympics appearances (overview)
- 1984; 1988; 1992; 1996; 2000; 2004; 2008; 2012; 2016; 2020; 2024

Mauritania competed at the 2016 Summer Olympics in Rio de Janeiro, Brazil, which was held from 5 to 21 August 2016. The country's participation at Rio de Janeiro marked its ninth appearance in the Summer Olympics since its debut at the 1984 Summer Olympics in Los Angeles.

The Mauritanian delegation featured only two athletes, resulting the country to have one of the smallest delegations at the Games. Among them were sprinters Jidou El Moctar and Houleye Ba, that were selected via universality slots from the IAAF, as the country had no athletes that met the time standards for any events. Moctar reprised his London 2012 role as flag bearer for the opening ceremony, whilst a volunteer carried it for the closing ceremony. Ultimately, neither Moctar nor Ba progressed beyond the heats of their events, leaving the Games without a single medal for the Mauritanians at these Games.

== Athletics (track and field) ==
Mauritania has received universality slots from IAAF to send two athletes (one male and one female) to the Olympics.

Key

- Note–Ranks given for track events are within the athlete's heat only
- Q = Qualified for the next round
- q = Qualified for the next round as a fastest loser or, in field events, by position without achieving the qualifying target
- NR = National record
- N/A = Round not applicable for the event
- Bye = Athlete not required to compete in round
- NM = No mark

Track & road events

Athlete	Event	Heat		Quarterfinal		Semifinal		Final	
Athlete	Event	Result	Rank	Result	Rank	Result	Rank	Result	Rank
Jidou El Moctar	Men's 100 m	11.44	7	did not advance					
Houleye Ba	Women's 800 m	2:43.52	8	—		did not advance			
