= Mauritania at the 2024 Summer Olympics =

- IOC code: MTN
- NOC: Comité National Mauritanien

in Paris, France 26 July 2024 – 11 August 2024
- Competitors: 2 (1 man and 1 woman) in 2 sports
- Flag bearers: Camil Doua & Salam Bouha Ahamdy
- Medals: Gold 0 Silver 0 Bronze 0 Total 0

Summer Olympics appearances (overview)
- 1984; 1988; 1992; 1996; 2000; 2004; 2008; 2012; 2016; 2020; 2024

Mauritania competed at the 2024 Summer Olympics in Paris which took place from 26 July to 11 August 2024. It was the nation's eleventh appearance at the Summer Olympics since its debut in 1984. The delegation consisted of two athletes: sprinter Salam Bouha Ahamdy, who competed in the women's 100 m event, and swimmer Camil Doua, who competed in the men's 50 m freestyle.

Ahamdy and Doua led the Mauritanian squad as the flagbearers in the opening ceremony, and the flag was held by a volunteer in the closing ceremony. Ahamdy ran a time of 13.71 and did not advance past her heat. Doua swam a time of 26.02 in his event, which was also not fast enough to advance to the next round; he finished 54th overall. Thus, Mauritania had yet to win an Olympic medal.

== Background ==
Mauritania, officially the Islamic Republic of Mauritania, is a country located in Northwest Africa between the Atlantic Ocean and Mali. In 2023 the country had an estimated population of 4,245,000. Formerly a French colony within French West Africa, Mauritania gained independence in 1960. The Mauritanian National Olympic and Sports Committee was formed in 1962 and was recognized by the International Olympic Committee in 1979. Mauritania had participated in every Summer Olympics since its debut in the 1984 Summer Olympics in Los Angeles. No Mauritanian had won a medal at the Olympics.

The 2024 Summer Olympics took place from 26 July to 11 August 2024. Sprinter Salam Bouha Ahamdy made her debut in the women's 100 metres, and swimmer Camil Doua made his Olympic debut in the men's 50 m freestyle event. Ahamdy and Doua served as flagbearers during the parade of nations at the opening ceremony, and the flag was held by a volunteer in the closing ceremony.

== Competitors ==
Doua was 22 years old at the time of the Olympics. He qualified via a universality place, which were reserved for athletes from under-represented nations, and was Mauritania's debut Olympic swimmer. He had previously attempted to qualify for the 2020 Summer Olympics but said that he was unable to do so without abandoning his French citizenship due to Mauritanian law at the time. By 2023, this situation had changed, and he was able to obtain dual citizenship and represent Mauritania in international competitions. At the time, Camil held several Mauritanian national records, including in the 50 m freestyle, 100 m freestyle, 50 m butterfly, and 50 m backstroke events. In preparation for the Olympics, he was trained by French Olympic medalist Grégory Mallet.

Ahamdy was 23 years old at the time of the Olympics. She was making her first appearance at the games. She qualified via universality place.

Sport	Men	Women	Total
Athletics	0	1	1
Swimming	1	0	1
Total	1	1	2

== Athletics ==
Mauritania sent one sprinter to compete at the 2024 Paris Olympics. She competed in the women's 100 m event, held on 2 August. She was drawn in heat one in the preliminaries. Ahamdy finished eighth out of nine athletes in her heat with a time of 13.71 seconds, failing to qualify for the heats round. After the race, Ahamdy went to help Lucia Moris of South Sudan, who had fallen due to a leg injury and was unable to finish.

Track and road events

Athlete	Event	Preliminary		Heat		Semifinal		Final	
Athlete	Event	Result	Rank	Result	Rank	Result	Rank	Result	Rank
Salam Bouha Ahamdy	Women's 100 m	13.71	8 in heat	Did not advance					

== Swimming ==
Mauritania sent one swimmer to compete at the 2024 Paris Olympics. In preparation for the Games, Doua was trained by French Olympic medalist Grégory Mallet. Doua was making his first appearance at the games and had qualified via universality place. He competed in the men's 50 m freestyle event, held on 1 August. He was drawn in heat four in the heats. Doua finished last out of eight athletes in his heat and 54th overall with a time of 26.02 seconds, failing to qualify for the semifinal round.

Athlete	Event	Heat		Semifinal		Final	
Athlete	Event	Time	Rank	Time	Rank	Time	Rank
Camil Doua	Men's 50 m freestyle	26.02	54	Did not advance			
