= Mauritania at the 1996 Summer Olympics =

- IOC code: MTN
- NOC: Comité National Mauritanien

in Atlanta
- Competitors: 4 in 1 sport
- Flag bearer: Noureddine Ould Ménira
- Medals: Gold 0 Silver 0 Bronze 0 Total 0

Summer Olympics appearances (overview)
- 1984; 1988; 1992; 1996; 2000; 2004; 2008; 2012; 2016; 2020; 2024

Mauritania competed at the 1996 Summer Olympics in Atlanta, United States.

== Competitors ==
The following is the list of number of competitors in the Games.

Sport	Men	Women	Total
Athletics	4	0	4
Total	4	0	4

== Results by event ==
=== Athletics ===
==== Men ====
Track and road events

Athletes	Events	Heat Round 1		Heat Round 2		Semifinal		Final	
Athletes	Events	Time	Rank	Time	Rank	Time	Rank	Time	Rank
Noureddine Ould Ménira	100 metres	10.95	92	did not advance					
Mohamed Ould Brahim	200 metres	22.71	77	did not advance					
Chérif Baba Aidara	800 metres	1:56.20	53	N/A		did not advance			
Sid'Ahmed Ould Mohamedou	5000 metres	15:29.16	37	N/A		did not advance			
