= 2024 Summer Olympics Parade of Nations =

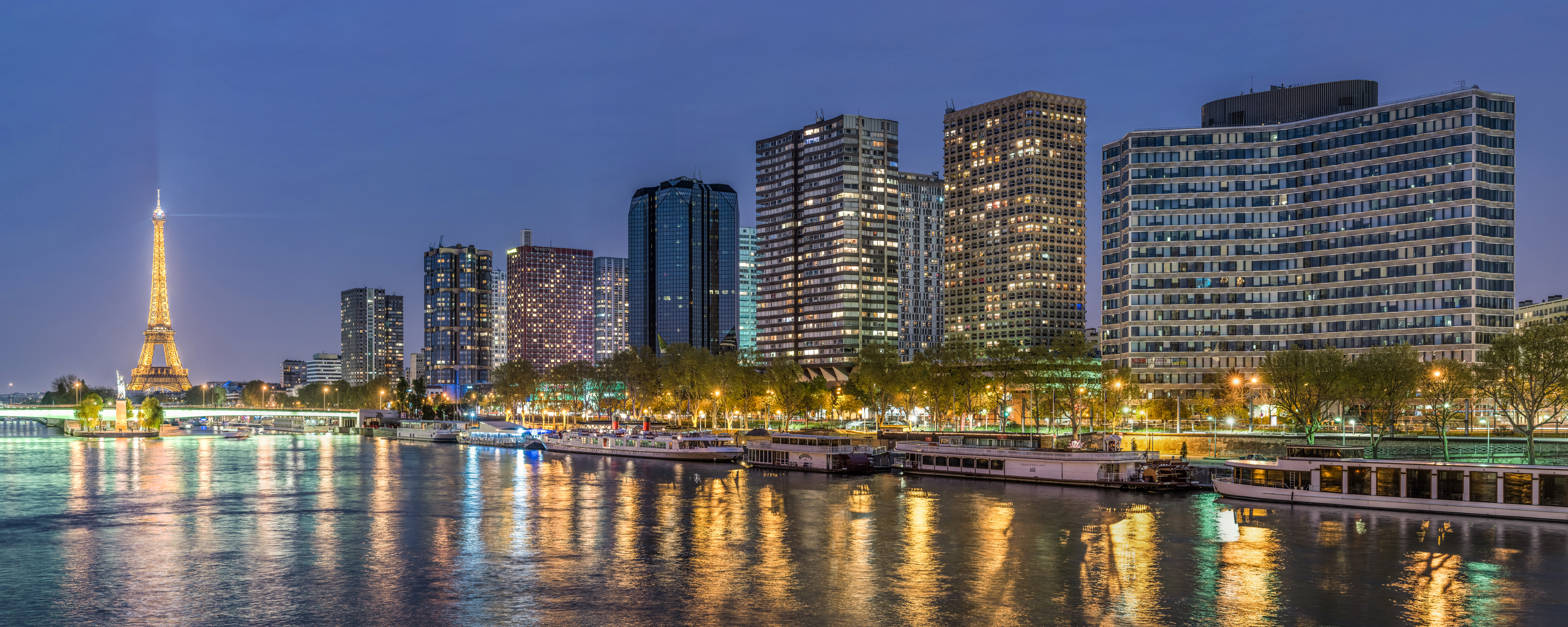
Teams entered in boats along the Seine river as part of the Parade of Nations

The 2024 Summer Olympics Parade of Nations within the 2024 Summer Olympics opening ceremony took place on 26 July 2024 on the Seine river in Paris, France. Athletes and officials from each participating team marched into the Jardins du Trocadéro preceded by their flag and placard bearer. Each flag bearer was chosen either by the team's National Olympic Committee or by the athletes themselves. On 13 December 2021, it was announced that the opening ceremony would feature athletes being transported by boat from Pont d'Austerlitz to Pont d'Iéna along the Seine river. The 6 kilometres (3.7 mi) route passed landmarks such as the Louvre, Notre-Dame de Paris, and Place de la Concorde, and feature cultural presentations. The official protocol took place at a 30,000-seat "mini-stadium" at the Trocadéro. For the first time in Olympic history, the parade procedure was not held during a separate portion of the opening ceremony, with the parade being integrated during the artistic programme, which simultaneously allowed for the athletes to sail on their boats during the artistic portion.

Organizers stated that the ceremony would be the most "spectacular and accessible opening ceremony in Olympic history", with Estanguet stating that it would be free to attend, and estimating that it could attract as many as 300,000 spectators. In addition, similar to the 2020 Summer Olympics, each team had the option of having a male flag bearer and a female flag bearer in an effort to promote gender equality.

== Parade order ==
Greece sailed out first, as the nation of the ancient and first modern Olympic Games, followed by the IOC Refugee Olympic Team, composed of refugees from several countries. Per the revised protocol introduced at the 2020 Summer Olympics, Australia was antepenultimate as the host of the 2032 Summer Olympics in Brisbane, the United States was penultimate as the host of the 2028 Summer Olympics in Los Angeles, and host nation France entered last. The United States being penultimate and France entering last also served as a preview of how the parade of nations will end during the opening ceremony of the 2030 Winter Olympics; two days before the opening ceremony, the IOC awarded the French Alps the 2030 games and the United States got the 2034 Winter Olympics in Salt Lake City.

Other teams sailed in alphabetical order in the language of the host country (French), according to tradition and IOC guidelines. Interestingly, the name boards had the English names of the delegations on the port side, from which the parading athletes and officials waved to the cameras; the French names faced the starboard side, as briefly seen when the Refugee Team's boat passed by one camera on that side behind the athletes.

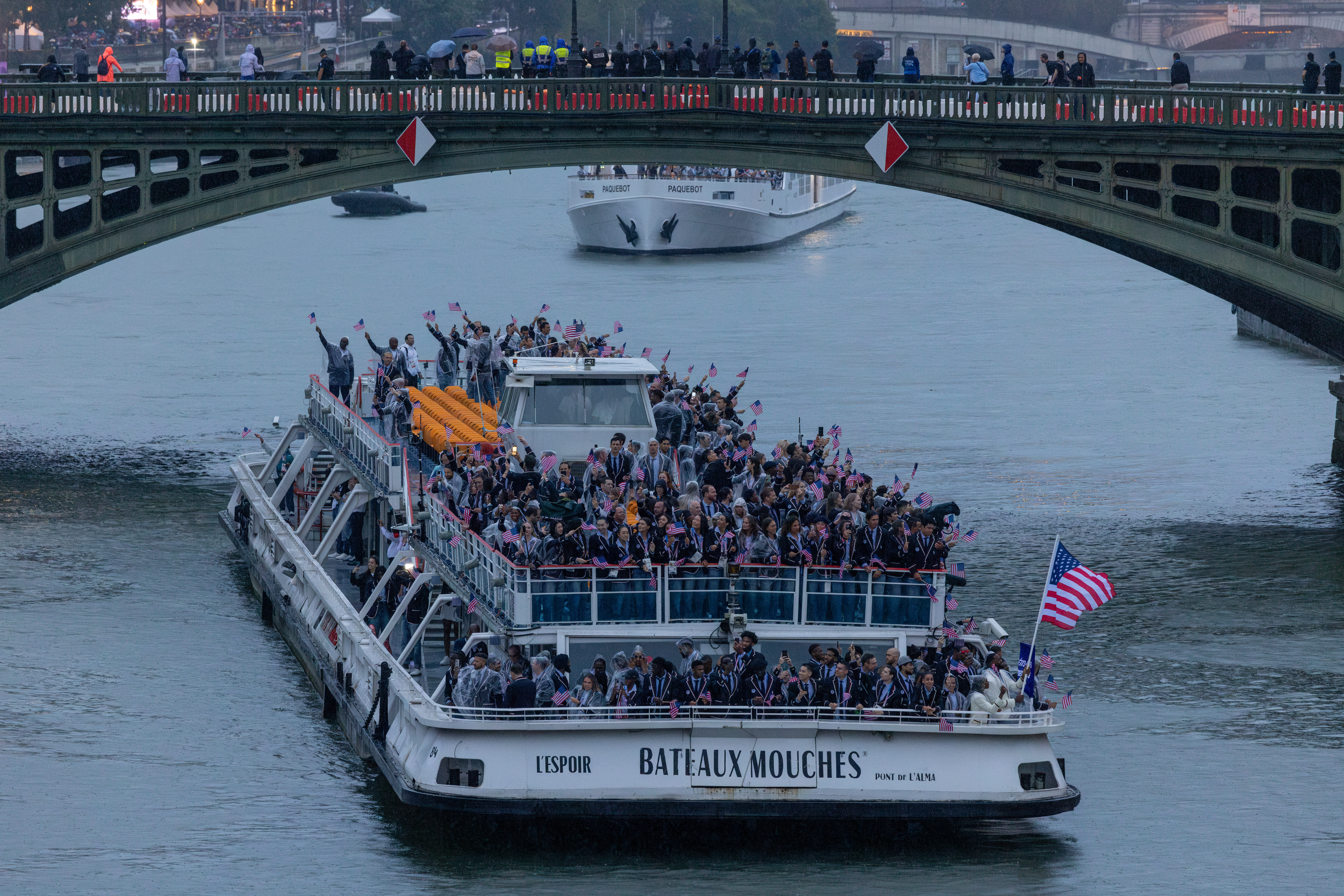
The United States Olympic team waves to onlookers during the opening ceremonies as its boat cruises along the River Seine.

While most countries entered teams under their short names, several entered under more formal or alternative names, sometimes due to political or naming disputes or for historical reasons. The People's Republic of China (commonly known as China), entered as the "People's Republic of China" (République populaire de Chine) under C. The Republic of the Congo entered as just "Congo", right before the Democratic Republic of the Congo, which entered under its full name (République démocratique du Congo). Similarly, South Korea entered as "Republic of Korea" (République de Corée) under C while North Korea entered as "Democratic People's Republic of Korea" (République populaire démocratique de Corée). The team from the United Kingdom entered as Great Britain (Grande-Bretagne), for historical reasons, and the team from Taiwan as "Chinese Taipei" (Chinese Taipei). Additionally, Brunei, the United States, East Timor, Hong Kong, Iran, Laos, Moldova, Syria, and Tanzania all entered under their formal names, respectively "Brunei Darussalam" (Brunei Darussalam), "United States of America" (États-Unis d'Amérique), "Democratic Republic of Timor-Leste" (République démocratique du Timor-Leste), "Hong Kong, China" (Hong Kong, Chine), "Islamic Republic of Iran" (République islamique d' Iran), "Lao People's Democratic Republic" (République populaire démocratique Lao), "Republic of Moldova" (République de Moldova), "Syrian Arab Republic" (République arabe syrienne), and "United Republic of Tanzania" (République-Unie de Tanzanie).

This is the first Olympics where the delegations of Cape Verde, the Czech Republic and Turkey were introduced under the names Cabo Verde, Czechia (Tchéquie) and Türkiye respectively.

=== Participation of Russian and Belarusian athletes ===
The potential participation of Russian and Belarusian athletes has remained controversial amid the Russian invasion of Ukraine. In February 2022, the International Olympic Committee (IOC) recommended sports federations to ban Russian and Belarusian athletes and officials from participating in international tournaments, citing the violation of the Olympic Truce.

In July 2023, the IOC stated that while Russia and Belarus would not be formally invited, their athletes would be allowed to compete as neutrals in a similar manner to Wimbledon after it reversed its ban of Russians and Belarusians that year. This was confirmed by the IOC in December 2023, with Russian and Belarusian athletes allowed to compete as neutrals without anthems or flags for the upcoming Games. As individual athletes, the delegation did not take part in the parade of nations during the opening ceremony.

== Teams and flagbearers ==
Below is a list of parading teams, the boats on which they travelled, and their announced flag bearer(s), in the same order as the parade. This is sortable by team name, flag bearer's name, and flag bearer's sport. The IOC named the final list of flagbearers on 26 July 2024.

| Order | Team | French | Flag bearer(s) | Sport(s) | Boat | Ref. |
|---|---|---|---|---|---|---|
| 1 | Greece | Grèce | Giannis Antetokounmpo | Basketball | Don Juan II | |
| 1 | Greece | Grèce | Antigoni Drisbioti | Athletics | Don Juan II | |
| 2 | Refugee Olympic Team | Équipe olympique des réfugiés | Yahya Al Ghotany | Taekwondo | Le Gavroche | |
| 2 | Refugee Olympic Team | Équipe olympique des réfugiés | Cindy Ngamba | Boxing | Le Gavroche | |
| 3 | Afghanistan | Afghanistan | Sha Mahmood Noor Zahi | Athletics | La Flûte | |
| 3 | Afghanistan | Afghanistan | Fariba Hashimi | Cycling (road) | La Flûte | |
| 4 | South Africa | Afrique du Sud | Akani Simbine | Athletics | La Flûte | |
| 4 | South Africa | Afrique du Sud | Caitlin Rooskrantz | Gymnastics (artistic) | La Flûte | |
| 5 | Albania | Albanie | Zelimkhan Abakarov | Wrestling | La Flûte | |
| 5 | Albania | Albanie | Kaltra Meca | Swimming | La Flûte | |
| 6 | Algeria | Algérie | Yasser Triki | Athletics | La Flûte | |
| 6 | Algeria | Algérie | Amina Belkadi | Judo | La Flûte | |
| 7 | Germany | Allemagne | Dennis Schröder | Basketball | La Flûte | |
| 7 | Germany | Allemagne | Anna-Maria Wagner | Judo | La Flûte | |
| 8 | Andorra | Andorre | Nahuel Carabaña | Athletics | Tivano | |
| 8 | Andorra | Andorre | Mònica Dòria | Canoeing (slalom) | Tivano | |
| 9 | Angola | Angola | Edmilson Pedro | Judo | Tivano | |
| 9 | Angola | Angola | Azenaide Carlos | Handball | Tivano | |
| 10 | Antigua and Barbuda | Antigua-et-Barbuda | Cejhae Greene | Athletics | Isabelle Adjani | |
| 10 | Antigua and Barbuda | Antigua-et-Barbuda | Joella Lloyd | Athletics | Isabelle Adjani | |
| 11 | Saudi Arabia | Arabie saoudite | Ramzy Al-Duhami | Equestrian (jumping) | Isabelle Adjani | |
| 11 | Saudi Arabia | Arabie saoudite | Donia Abu Talib | Taekwondo | Isabelle Adjani | |
| 12 | Argentina | Argentine | Luciano De Cecco | Volleyball | Isabelle Adjani | |
| 12 | Argentina | Argentine | Rocío Sánchez Moccia | Field hockey | Isabelle Adjani | |
| 13 | Armenia | Arménie | Davit Chaloyan | Boxing | Isabelle Adjani | |
| 13 | Armenia | Arménie | Varsenik Manucharyan | Swimming | Isabelle Adjani | |
| 14 | Aruba | Aruba | Mikel Schreuders | Swimming | Isabelle Adjani | |
| 14 | Aruba | Aruba | Chloë Farro | Swimming | Isabelle Adjani | |
| 15 | Austria | Autriche | Felix Oschmautz | Canoeing (slalom) | Tennessee | |
| 15 | Austria | Autriche | Michaela Polleres | Judo | Tennessee | |
| 16 | Azerbaijan | Azerbaïdjan | Mahammad Abdullayev | Boxing | Tennessee | |
| 16 | Azerbaijan | Azerbaïdjan | Gultaj Mammadaliyeva | Judo | Tennessee | |
| 17 | Bahamas | Bahamas | Steven Gardiner | Athletics | Tennessee | |
| 17 | Bahamas | Bahamas | Devynne Charlton | Athletics | Tennessee | |
| 18 | Bahrain | Bahreïn | Saud Ghali | Swimming | Riverlounge | |
| 18 | Bahrain | Bahreïn | Amani Al-Obaidli | Swimming | Riverlounge | |
| 19 | Bangladesh | Bangladesh | Sagor Islam | Archery | Paris Yacht 1 | |
| 19 | Bangladesh | Bangladesh | Mst Sonia Khatun | Swimming | Paris Yacht 1 | |
| 20 | Barbados | Barbade | Jack Kirby | Swimming | Paris Montparnasse | |
| 20 | Barbados | Barbade | Sada Williams | Athletics | Paris Montparnasse | |
| 21 | Belgium | Belgique | Jérôme Guery | Equestrian (jumping) | Paris Montparnasse | |
| 21 | Belgium | Belgique | Emma Meesseman | Basketball | Paris Montparnasse | |
| 22 | Belize | Belize | Shaun Gill | Athletics | Paris Montparnasse | |
| 23 | Benin | Bénin | Valentin Houinato | Judo | Paris Montparnasse | |
| 23 | Benin | Bénin | Noélie Yarigo | Athletics | Paris Montparnasse | |
| 24 | Bermuda | Bermudes | Jah-Nhai Perinchief | Athletics | Paris Montparnasse | |
| 24 | Bermuda | Bermudes | Adriana Penruddocke | Sailing | Paris Montparnasse | |
| 25 | Bhutan | Bhoutan | Sangay Tenzin | Swimming | The Murano | |
| 25 | Bhutan | Bhoutan | Kinzang Lhamo | Athletics | The Murano | |
| 26 | Bolivia | Bolivie | Héctor Garibay | Athletics | Le Martin Pêcheur | |
| 26 | Bolivia | Bolivie | María José Ribera | Swimming | Le Martin Pêcheur | |
| 27 | Bosnia and Herzegovina | Bosnie-Herzégovine | Mesud Pezer | Athletics | Le Martin Pêcheur | |
| 27 | Bosnia and Herzegovina | Bosnie-Herzégovine | Larisa Cerić | Judo | Le Martin Pêcheur | |
| 28 | Botswana | Botswana | Letsile Tebogo | Athletics | Le Martin Pêcheur | |
| 28 | Botswana | Botswana | Maxine Egner | Swimming | Le Martin Pêcheur | |
| 29 | Brazil | Brésil | Isaquias Queiroz | Canoeing (sprint) | Bel Ami | |
| 29 | Brazil | Brésil | Raquel Kochhann | Rugby sevens | Bel Ami | |
| 30 | Brunei | Brunéi Darussalam | Zeke Chan | Swimming | Melody Blues | |
| 30 | Brunei | Brunéi Darussalam | Hayley Wong | Swimming | Melody Blues | |
| 31 | Bulgaria | Bulgarie | Lyubomir Epitropov | Swimming | Melody Blues | |
| 31 | Bulgaria | Bulgarie | Stanimira Petrova | Boxing | Melody Blues | |
| 32 | Burkina Faso | Burkina Faso | Hugues Fabrice Zango | Athletics | Melody Blues | |
| 32 | Burkina Faso | Burkina Faso | Marthe Koala | Athletics | Melody Blues | |
| 33 | Burundi | Burundi | Belly-Cresus Ganira | Swimming | Melody Blues | |
| 33 | Burundi | Burundi | Ange Ciella Niragira | Judo | Melody Blues | |
| 34 | Cape Verde | Cabo Verde | Daniel Varela de Pina | Boxing | Melody Blues | |
| 34 | Cape Verde | Cabo Verde | Djamila Silva | Judo | Melody Blues | |
| 35 | Cayman Islands | Îles Caïmans | Jordan Crooks | Swimming | Farö | |
| 35 | Cayman Islands | Îles Caïmans | Charlotte Webster | Sailing | Farö | |
| 36 | Cambodia | Cambodge | Chhun Bunthorn | Athletics | Corto | |
| 36 | Cambodia | Cambodge | Apsara Sakbun | Swimming | Corto | |
| 37 | Cameroon | Cameroun | Emmanuel Eseme | Athletics | Coche D'Eau | |
| 37 | Cameroon | Cameroun | Richelle Anita Soppi Mbella | Judo | Coche D'Eau | |
| 38 | Canada | Canada | Andre De Grasse | Athletics | Coche D'Eau | |
| 38 | Canada | Canada | Maude Charron | Weightlifting | Coche D'Eau | |
| 39 | Central African Republic | République centrafricaine | Terence Tengue | Swimming | Coche D'Eau | |
| 39 | Central African Republic | République centrafricaine | Nadia Matchiko Guimendego | Judo | Coche D'Eau | |
| 40 | Chile | Chili | Nicolás Jarry | Tennis | Coche D'Eau | |
| 40 | Chile | Chili | Antonia Abraham | Rowing | Coche D'Eau | |
| 41 | China | République populaire de Chine | Ma Long | Table tennis | Coche D'Eau | |
| 41 | China | République populaire de Chine | Feng Yu | Artistic swimming | Coche D'Eau | |
| 42 | Cyprus | Chypre | Milan Trajkovic | Athletics | L'Hydraseine | |
| 42 | Cyprus | Chypre | Elena Kulichenko | Athletics | L'Hydraseine | |
| 43 | Colombia | Colombie | Kevin Quintero | Cycling (track) | L'Hydraseine | |
| 43 | Colombia | Colombie | Flor Ruiz | Athletics | L'Hydraseine | |
| 44 | Comoros | Comores | Hachim Maaroufou | Athletics | L'Hydraseine | |
| 44 | Comoros | Comores | Maesha Saadi | Swimming | L'Hydraseine | |
| 45 | Republic of the Congo | Congo | Freddy Mayala | Swimming | Victoria 1 | |
| 45 | Republic of the Congo | Congo | Natacha Ngoye Akamabi | Athletics | Victoria 1 | |
| 46 | Democratic Republic of the Congo | République démocratique du Congo | Dominique Lasconi Mulamba | Athletics | Excellence | |
| 46 | Democratic Republic of the Congo | République démocratique du Congo | Brigitte Mbabi | Boxing | Excellence | |
| 47 | Cook Islands | Îles Cook | Alex Beddoes | Athletics | Excellence | |
| 47 | Cook Islands | Îles Cook | Lanihei Connolly | Swimming | Excellence | |
| 48 | South Korea | République de Corée | Woo Sang-hyeok | Athletics | Excellence | |
| 48 | South Korea | République de Corée | Kim Seo-yeong | Swimming | Excellence | |
| 49 | Costa Rica | Costa Rica | Gerald Drummond | Athletics | Excellence | |
| 49 | Costa Rica | Costa Rica | Milagro Mena | Cycling (road) | Excellence | |
| 50 | Ivory Coast | Côte d'Ivoire | Cheick Sallah Cissé | Taekwondo | Excellence | |
| 50 | Ivory Coast | Côte d'Ivoire | Marie-Josée Ta Lou | Athletics | Excellence | |
| 51 | Croatia | Croatie | Giovanni Cernogoraz | Shooting | Rivoli | |
| 51 | Croatia | Croatie | Barbara Matić | Judo | Rivoli | |
| 52 | Cuba | Cuba | Julio César La Cruz | Boxing | Paris Montmartre | |
| 52 | Cuba | Cuba | Idalys Ortiz | Judo | Paris Montmartre | |
| 53 | Denmark | Danemark | Niklas Landin Jacobsen | Handball | Paris Montmartre | |
| 53 | Denmark | Danemark | Anne-Marie Rindom | Sailing | Paris Montmartre | |
| 54 | Djibouti | Djibouti | Mohamed Ismail | Athletics | Paris Montmartre | |
| 54 | Djibouti | Djibouti | Samiyah Hassan Nour | Athletics | Paris Montmartre | |
| 55 | Dominican Republic | République dominicaine | Audrys Nin Reyes | Gymnastics (artistic) | Dauphine | |
| 55 | Dominican Republic | République dominicaine | Marileidy Paulino | Athletics | Dauphine | |
| 56 | Dominica | Dominique | Dennick Luke | Athletics | Paris Étoile | |
| 56 | Dominica | Dominique | Thea LaFond-Gadson | Athletics | Paris Étoile | |
| 57 | Egypt | Égypte | Ahmed El-Gendy | Modern pentathlon | Paris Étoile | |
| 57 | Egypt | Égypte | Sara Ahmed | Weightlifting | Paris Étoile | |
| 58 | El Salvador | El Salvador | Uriel Canjura | Badminton | Paris Étoile | |
| 58 | El Salvador | El Salvador | Celina Márquez | Swimming | Paris Étoile | |
| 59 | United Arab Emirates | Émirats arabes unis | Omar Al Marzouqi | Equestrian | Le Henri IV | |
| 59 | United Arab Emirates | Émirats arabes unis | Safia Al-Sayegh | Cycling (road) | Le Henri IV | |
| 60 | Ecuador | Équateur | Julio Mendoza Loor | Equestrian (dressage) | Le Henri IV | |
| 60 | Ecuador | Équateur | Neisi Dájomes | Weightlifting | Le Henri IV | |
| 61 | Eritrea | Érythrée | Biniam Girmay | Cycling (road) | Le Henri IV | |
| 61 | Eritrea | Érythrée | Christina Rach | Swimming | Le Henri IV | |
| 62 | Spain | Espagne | Marcus Cooper Walz | Canoeing (sprint) | Pierre Belon | |
| 62 | Spain | Espagne | Támara Echegoyen | Sailing | Pierre Belon | |
| 63 | Estonia | Estonie | Klen Kristofer Kaljulaid | Judo | Pierre Belon | |
| 63 | Estonia | Estonie | Reena Pärnat | Archery | Pierre Belon | |
| 64 | Eswatini | Eswatini | Chadd Ng Chiu Hing Ning | Swimming | Vernazza | |
| 64 | Eswatini | Eswatini | Hayley Hoy | Swimming | Vernazza | |
| 65 | Ethiopia | Éthiopie | Misgana Wakuma | Athletics | Mistinguett | |
| 65 | Ethiopia | Éthiopie | Lina Alemayehu Selo | Swimming | Mistinguett | |
| 66 | Fiji | Fidji | Viliame Ratulu | Sailing | Mistinguett | |
| 66 | Fiji | Fidji | Raijieli Daveua | Rugby sevens | Mistinguett | |
| 67 | Finland | Finlande | Eetu Kallioinen | Shooting | Mistinguett | |
| 67 | Finland | Finlande | Sinem Kurtbay | Sailing | Mistinguett | |
| 68 | Gabon | Gabon | Wissy Frank Hoye Yenda Moukoula | Athletics | Kaïros | |
| 68 | Gabon | Gabon | Noelie Annette Lacour | Swimming | Kaïros | |
| 69 | The Gambia | Gambie | Faye Njie | Judo | Joséphine | |
| 69 | The Gambia | Gambie | Gina Mariam Bass Bittaye | Athletics | Joséphine | |
| 70 | Georgia | Géorgie | Lasha Talakhadze | Weightlifting | Joséphine | |
| 70 | Georgia | Géorgie | Nino Salukvadze | Shooting | Joséphine | |
| 71 | Ghana | Ghana | Joseph Paul Amoah | Athletics | Marinella | |
| 71 | Ghana | Ghana | Rose Amoanimaa Yeboah | Athletics | Marinella | |
| 72 | Great Britain | Grande-Bretagne | Tom Daley | Diving | Jeanne Moreau | |
| 72 | Great Britain | Grande-Bretagne | Helen Glover | Rowing | Jeanne Moreau | |
| 73 | Grenada | Grenade | Lindon Victor | Athletics | Jeanne Moreau | |
| 73 | Grenada | Grenade | Tilly Collymore | Swimming | Jeanne Moreau | |
| 74 | Guam | Guam | Joseph Green | Badminton | Jeanne Moreau | |
| 74 | Guam | Guam | Rckaela Aquino | Wrestling | Jeanne Moreau | |
| 75 | Guatemala | Guatemala | Kevin Cordón | Badminton | Jeanne Moreau | |
| 75 | Guatemala | Guatemala | Waleska Soto | Shooting | Jeanne Moreau | |
| 76 | Guinea | Guinée | Naby Keïta | Football | Le Chansonnier | |
| 76 | Guinea | Guinée | Fatoumata Sylla | Archery | Le Chansonnier | |
| 77 | Guinea-Bissau | Guinée-Bissau | Diamantino Iuna Fafé | Wrestling | Le Chansonnier | |
| 78 | Equatorial Guinea | Guinée équatoriale | Sefora Ada Eto | Athletics | Le Chansonnier | |
| 78 | Equatorial Guinea | Guinée équatoriale | Higinio Ndong Obama | Swimming | Le Chansonnier | |
| 79 | Guyana | Guyana | Emanuel Archibald | Athletics | Le Chansonnier | |
| 79 | Guyana | Guyana | Chelsea Edghill | Table tennis | Le Chansonnier | |
| 80 | Haiti | Haïti | Phillipe Metellus | Judo | Caïpirinha | |
| 80 | Haiti | Haïti | Lynnzee Brown | Gymnastics (artistic) | Caïpirinha | |
| 81 | Honduras | Honduras | Kevin Mejía | Wrestling | Europa | |
| 81 | Honduras | Honduras | Julimar Ávila | Swimming | Europa | |
| 82 | Hong Kong | Hong Kong, Chine | Cheung Ka Long | Fencing | Europa | |
| 82 | Hong Kong | Hong Kong, Chine | Siobhán Haughey | Swimming | Europa | |
| 83 | Hungary | Hongrie | Krisztián Tóth | Judo | Europa | |
| 83 | Hungary | Hongrie | Blanka Bíró | Handball | Europa | |
| 84 | India | Inde | Sharath Kamal | Table tennis | Le Jean-Bruel | |
| 84 | India | Inde | P. V. Sindhu | Badminton | Le Jean-Bruel | |
| 85 | Indonesia | Indonésie | Maryam March Maharani | Judo | Le Jean-Bruel | |
| 86 | Iran | République islamique d'Iran | Mahdi Olfati | Gymnastics (artistic) | Le Jean-Bruel | |
| 86 | Iran | République islamique d'Iran | Neda Shahsavari | Table tennis | Le Jean-Bruel | |
| 87 | Iraq | Iraq | Ali Rubaiawi | Weightlifting | Evasion | |
| 88 | Ireland | Irlande | Shane Lowry | Golf | Evasion | |
| 88 | Ireland | Irlande | Sarah Lavin | Athletics | Evasion | |
| 89 | Iceland | Islande | Hákon Svavarsson | Shooting | Le Mulet Coureau | |
| 89 | Iceland | Islande | Edda Hannesdóttir | Triathlon | Le Mulet Coureau | |
| 90 | Israel | Israël | Peter Paltchik | Judo | Le Mulet Coureau | |
| 90 | Israel | Israël | Andrea Murez | Swimming | Le Mulet Coureau | |
| 91 | Italy | Italie | Gianmarco Tamberi | Athletics | Le Mulet Coureau | |
| 91 | Italy | Italie | Arianna Errigo | Fencing | Le Mulet Coureau | |
| 92 | Jamaica | Jamaïque | Josh Kirlew | Swimming | Le Mulet Coureau | |
| 92 | Jamaica | Jamaïque | Shanieka Ricketts | Athletics | Le Mulet Coureau | |
| 93 | Japan | Japon | Shigeyuki Nakarai | Breaking | La Galiote | |
| 93 | Japan | Japon | Misaki Emura | Fencing | La Galiote | |
| 94 | Jordan | Jordanie | Saleh El-Sharabaty | Taekwondo | La Galiote | |
| 94 | Jordan | Jordanie | Rama Abu Al-Rub | Taekwondo | La Galiote | |
| 95 | Kazakhstan | Kazakhstan | Aslanbek Shymbergenov | Boxing | La Galiote | |
| 95 | Kazakhstan | Kazakhstan | Olga Safronova | Athletics | La Galiote | |
| 96 | Kenya | Kenya | Ferdinand Omanyala | Athletics | La Galiote | |
| 96 | Kenya | Kenya | Triza Atuka | Volleyball | La Galiote | |
| 97 | Kyrgyzstan | Kirghizistan | Erlan Sherov | Judo | Le Rhône | |
| 97 | Kyrgyzstan | Kirghizistan | Elizaveta Pecherskikh | Swimming | Le Rhône | |
| 98 | Kiribati | Kiribati | Kaimauri Erati | Weightlifting | Le Buci | |
| 98 | Kiribati | Kiribati | Nera Tiebwa | Judo | Le Buci | |
| 99 | Kosovo | Kosovo | Nora Gjakova | Judo | Arletty | |
| 99 | Kosovo | Kosovo | Akil Gjakova | Judo | Arletty | |
| 100 | Kuwait | Koweït | Youssef Al-Shamlan | Fencing | Arletty | |
| 100 | Kuwait | Koweït | Saud Al-Faqaan | Rowing | Arletty | |
| 101 | Laos | République démocratique populaire lao | Steven Insixiengmay | Swimming | Arletty | |
| 101 | Laos | République démocratique populaire lao | Silina Pha Aphay | Athletics | Arletty | |
| 102 | Lesotho | Lesotho | Tebello Ramakongoana | Athletics | Arletty | |
| 102 | Lesotho | Lesotho | Michelle Tau | Taekwondo | Arletty | |
| 103 | Latvia | Lettonie | Nauris Miezis | 3x3 basketball | Le Montebello | |
| 103 | Latvia | Lettonie | Tīna Graudiņa | Beach volleyball | Le Montebello | |
| 104 | Lebanon | Liban | Simon Doueihy | Swimming | Le Montebello | |
| 104 | Lebanon | Liban | Laetitia Aoun | Taekwondo | Le Montebello | |
| 105 | Liberia | Libéria | Emmanuel Matadi | Athletics | Le Montebello | |
| 105 | Liberia | Libéria | Thelma Davies | Athletics | Le Montebello | |
| 106 | Libya | Libye | Ahmed Abuzriba | Weightlifting | Le Montebello | |
| 106 | Libya | Libye | Mek Almukhtar | Swimming | Le Montebello | |
| 107 | Liechtenstein | Liechtenstein | Romano Püntener | Cycling | Loceynius | |
| 108 | Lithuania | Lituanie | Justina Vanagaitė | Equestrian | Loceynius | |
| 108 | Lithuania | Lituanie | Rytis Jasiūnas | Sailing | Loceynius | |
| 109 | Luxembourg | Luxembourg | Bob Bertemes | Athletics | Le Rocca II | |
| 109 | Luxembourg | Luxembourg | Ni Xia Lian | Table tennis | Le Rocca II | |
| 110 | North Macedonia | Macédoine du Nord | Dario Ivanovski | Athletics | Le Rocca II | |
| 110 | North Macedonia | Macédoine du Nord | Miljana Reljiḱ | Taekwondo | Le Rocca II | |
| 111 | Madagascar | Madagascar | Fabio Rakotoarimanana | Table tennis | Le Rocca II | |
| 111 | Madagascar | Madagascar | Rosina Randafiarison | Weightlifting | Le Rocca II | |
| 112 | Malaysia | Malaisie | Bertrand Rhodict Lises | Diving | JS Mouche | |
| 112 | Malaysia | Malaisie | Nur Shazrin Mohd Latif | Sailing | JS Mouche | |
| 113 | Malawi | Malawi | Filipe Gomes | Swimming | JS Mouche | |
| 113 | Malawi | Malawi | Asimenye Simwaka | Athletics | JS Mouche | |
| 114 | Maldives | Maldives | Ibadulla Adam | Athletics | JS Mouche | |
| 114 | Maldives | Maldives | Fathimath Dheema Ali | Table tennis | JS Mouche | |
| 115 | Mali | Mali | Alexien Kouma | Swimming | Paris Iéna | |
| 115 | Mali | Mali | Marine Camara | Boxing | Paris Iéna | |
| 116 | Malta | Malte | Gianluca Chetcuti | Shooting | Paris Iéna | |
| 116 | Malta | Malte | Sasha Gatt | Swimming | Paris Iéna | |
| 117 | Morocco | Maroc | Yessin Rahmouni | Equestrian (dressage) | Paris Iéna | |
| 117 | Morocco | Maroc | Ines Laklalech | Golf | Paris Iéna | |
| 118 | Marshall Islands | Îles Marshall | William Reed | Athletics | Le Black Swan | |
| 118 | Marshall Islands | Îles Marshall | Mathlynn Sasser | Weightlifting | Le Black Swan | |
| 119 | Mauritius | Maurice | Jean Gaël Laurent L'Entete | Triathlon | Cachemire | |
| 119 | Mauritius | Maurice | Aurelie Halbwachs | Cycling | Cachemire | |
| 120 | Mauritania | Mauritanie | Camil Doua | Swimming | Senang | |
| 120 | Mauritania | Mauritanie | Salam Bouha Ahamdy | Athletics | Senang | |
| 121 | Mexico | Mexique | Emiliano Hernández | Modern pentathlon | La Patache | |
| 121 | Mexico | Mexique | Alejandra Orozco | Diving | La Patache | |
| 122 | Federated States of Micronesia | États fédérés de Micronésie | Tasi Limtiaco | Swimming | La Patache | |
| 122 | Federated States of Micronesia | États fédérés de Micronésie | Kestra Kihleng | Swimming | La Patache | |
| 123 | Moldova | République de Moldova | Dan Olaru | Archery | La Patache | |
| 123 | Moldova | République de Moldova | Alexandra Mîrca | Archery | La Patache | |
| 124 | Monaco | Monaco | Théo Druenne | Swimming | La Patache | |
| 124 | Monaco | Monaco | Lisa Pou | Swimming | La Patache | |
| 125 | Mongolia | Mongolie | Bat-Ochiryn Ser-Od | Athletics | Jean Marais | |
| 125 | Mongolia | Mongolie | Oyuntsetseg Yesügen | Boxing | Jean Marais | |
| 126 | Montenegro | Monténégro | Milivoj Dukić | Sailing | Jean Marais | |
| 126 | Montenegro | Monténégro | Danka Kovinić | Tennis | Jean Marais | |
| 127 | Mozambique | Mozambique | Matthew Lawrence | Swimming | Jean Marais | |
| 127 | Mozambique | Mozambique | Alcinda Panguana | Boxing | Jean Marais | |
| 128 | Myanmar | Myanmar | Phone Pyae Han | Swimming | Jean Marais | |
| 128 | Myanmar | Myanmar | Thet Htar Thuzar | Badminton | Jean Marais | |
| 129 | Namibia | Namibie | Alexander Miller | Cycling (Mountain bike) | Deborah | |
| 129 | Namibia | Namibie | Vera Looser | Cycling (road) | Deborah | |
| 130 | Nauru | Nauru | Winzar Kakiouea | Athletics | Deborah | |
| 131 | Nepal | Népal | Santu Shrestha | Table tennis | Deborah | |
| 131 | Nepal | Népal | Manita Shrestha Pradhan | Judo | Deborah | |
| 132 | Nicaragua | Nicaragua | Gerald Hernández | Swimming | Cosmopolitan | |
| 132 | Nicaragua | Nicaragua | Izayana Marenco | Judo | Cosmopolitan | |
| 133 | Niger | Niger | Abdoul Razak Issoufou | Taekwondo | Le Diamant Bleu | |
| 133 | Niger | Niger | Samira Awali Boubacar | Athletics | Le Diamant Bleu | |
| 134 | Nigeria | Nigéria | Tobi Amusan | Athletics | Le Diamant Bleu | |
| 134 | Nigeria | Nigéria | Anuoluwapo Juwon Opeyori | Badminton | Le Diamant Bleu | |
| 135 | Norway | Norvège | Christian Sørum | Volleyball (beach) | Le Diamant Bleu | |
| 135 | Norway | Norvège | Katrine Lunde | Handball | Le Diamant Bleu | |
| 136 | New Zealand | Nouvelle-Zélande | Aaron Gate | Cycling (track) | Boreas | |
| 136 | New Zealand | Nouvelle-Zélande | Jo Aleh | Sailing | Boreas | |
| 137 | Oman | Oman | Ali Anwar Al-Balushi | Athletics | Boreas | |
| 137 | Oman | Oman | Mazoon Al-Alawi | Athletics | Boreas | |
| 138 | Uganda | Ouganda | Charles Kagimu | Cycling (road) | Boreas | |
| 138 | Uganda | Ouganda | Gloria Muzito | Swimming | Boreas | |
| 139 | Uzbekistan | Ouzbékistan | Abdumalik Khalokov | Boxing | Boreas | |
| 139 | Uzbekistan | Ouzbékistan | Zaynab Dayibekova | Fencing | Boreas | |
| 140 | Pakistan | Pakistan | Arshad Nadeem | Athletics | Boreas | |
| 140 | Pakistan | Pakistan | Jehanara Nabi | Swimming | Boreas | |
| 141 | Palau | Palaos | Jion Hosei | Swimming | Cuba Libre | |
| 141 | Palau | Palaos | Sydney Francisco | Athletics | Cuba Libre | |
| 142 | Palestine | Palestine | Wasim Abusal | Boxing | Le Canotier | |
| 142 | Palestine | Palestine | Valerie Tarazi | Swimming | Le Canotier | |
| 143 | Panama | Panama | Franklin Archibold | Cycling (road) | Le Canotier | |
| 143 | Panama | Panama | Hillary Heron | Gymnastics (artistic) | Le Canotier | |
| 144 | Papua New Guinea | Papouasie-Nouvelle-Guinée | Gibson Mara | Taekwondo | Le Canotier | |
| 144 | Papua New Guinea | Papouasie-Nouvelle-Guinée | Georgia-Leigh Vele | Swimming | Le Canotier | |
| 145 | Paraguay | Paraguay | Fabrizio Zanotti | Golf | Le Canotier | |
| 145 | Paraguay | Paraguay | Alejandra Alonso | Rowing | Le Canotier | |
| 146 | Netherlands | Pays-Bas | Worthy de Jong | 3x3 basketball | Le Paris | |
| 146 | Netherlands | Pays-Bas | Lois Abbingh | Handball | Le Paris | |
| 147 | Peru | Pérou | Juan Postigos | Judo | Le Paris | |
| 147 | Peru | Pérou | María Luisa Doig | Fencing | Le Paris | |
| 148 | Philippines | Philippines | Carlo Paalam | Boxing | Parisis | |
| 148 | Philippines | Philippines | Nesthy Petecio | Boxing | Parisis | |
| 149 | Poland | Pologne | Przemysław Zamojski | 3x3 basketball | Parisis | |
| 149 | Poland | Pologne | Anita Włodarczyk | Athletics | Parisis | |
| 150 | Puerto Rico | Porto Rico | Sebastian Rivera | Wrestling | Parisis | |
| 150 | Puerto Rico | Porto Rico | Jasmine Camacho-Quinn | Athletics | Parisis | |
| 151 | Portugal | Portugal | Fernando Pimenta | Canoeing (sprint) | Clipper Paris | |
| 151 | Portugal | Portugal | Ana Cabecinha | Athletics | Clipper Paris | |
| 152 | Qatar | Qatar | Mutaz Essa Barshim | Athletics | Clipper Paris | |
| 152 | Qatar | Qatar | Shahad Mohamed | Athletics | Clipper Paris | |
| 153 | North Korea | République populaire démocratique de Corée | Im Yong-myong | Diving | Clipper Paris | |
| 153 | North Korea | République populaire démocratique de Corée | Mun Song-hui | Judo | Clipper Paris | |
| 154 | Romania | Roumanie | Marius Cozmiuc | Rowing | Le Capitaine Fracasse | |
| 154 | Romania | Roumanie | Ionela Cozmiuc | Rowing | Le Capitaine Fracasse | |
| 155 | Rwanda | Rwanda | Eric Manizabayo | Cycling (road) | Le Capitaine Fracasse | |
| 155 | Rwanda | Rwanda | Clementine Mukandanga | Athletics | Le Capitaine Fracasse | |
| 156 | Saint Kitts and Nevis | Saint-Kitts-et-Nevis | Naquille Harris | Athletics | Petrus III | |
| 156 | Saint Kitts and Nevis | Saint-Kitts-et-Nevis | Zahria Allers-Liburd | Athletics | Petrus III | |
| 157 | Saint Lucia | Sainte-Lucie | Michael Joseph | Athletics | Joséphine | |
| 158 | San Marino | Saint-Marin | Loris Bianchi | Swimming | Joséphine | |
| 158 | San Marino | Saint-Marin | Alessandra Gasparelli | Athletics | Joséphine | |
| 159 | Saint Vincent and the Grenadines | Saint-Vincent-et-les-Grenadines | Alex Joachim | Swimming | Joséphine | |
| 159 | Saint Vincent and the Grenadines | Saint-Vincent-et-les-Grenadines | Shafiqua Maloney | Athletics | Joséphine | |
| 160 | Solomon Islands | Îles Salomon | Sharon Firisua | Athletics | Chardonnay | |
| 160 | Solomon Islands | Îles Salomon | Isabella Millar | Swimming | Chardonnay | |
| 161 | Samoa | Samoa | Don Opeloge | Weightlifting | Escapade | |
| 161 | Samoa | Samoa | Iuniarra Sipaia | Weightlifting | Escapade | |
| 162 | American Samoa | Samoa américaines | Micah Masei | Swimming | Escapade | |
| 162 | American Samoa | Samoa américaines | Filomenaleonisa Iakopo | Athletics | Escapade | |
| 163 | São Tomé and Príncipe | Sao Tomé-et-Principe | Roldeney de Oliveira | Judo | Escapade | |
| 163 | São Tomé and Príncipe | Sao Tomé-et-Principe | Gorete Semedo | Athletics | Escapade | |
| 164 | Senegal | Sénégal | Louis François Mendy | Athletics | Escapade | |
| 164 | Senegal | Sénégal | Combe Seck | Canoeing | Escapade | |
| 165 | Serbia | Serbie | Dušan Mandić | Water polo | Victoria | |
| 165 | Serbia | Serbie | Maja Ognjenović | Volleyball | Victoria | |
| 166 | Seychelles | Seychelles | Dylan Sicobo | Athletics | Victoria | |
| 166 | Seychelles | Seychelles | Khema Elizabeth | Swimming | Victoria | |
| 167 | Sierra Leone | Sierra Leone | Joshua Wyse | Swimming | Victoria | |
| 167 | Sierra Leone | Sierra Leone | Mariama Koroma | Judo | Victoria | |
| 168 | Singapore | Singapour | Ryan Lo | Sailing | Le Singapour | |
| 168 | Singapore | Singapour | Shanti Pereira | Athletics | Le Singapour | |
| 169 | Slovakia | Slovaquie | Jakub Grigar | Canoeing (slalom) | Le Signature | |
| 169 | Slovakia | Slovaquie | Zuzana Paňková | Canoeing (slalom) | Le Signature | |
| 170 | Slovenia | Slovénie | Benjamin Savšek | Canoeing (slalom) | Le Signature | |
| 170 | Slovenia | Slovénie | Ana Gros | Handball | Le Signature | |
| 171 | Somalia | Somalie | Ali Idow Hassan | Athletics | Le Signature | |
| 172 | Sudan | Soudan | Yaseen Abdalla | Athletics | Vagor | |
| 172 | Sudan | Soudan | Rana Saadeldin | Swimming | Vagor | |
| 173 | South Sudan | Soudan du Sud | Kuany Kuany | Basketball (5x5) | Paris Trocadero | |
| 173 | South Sudan | Soudan du Sud | Lucia Moris | Athletics | Paris Trocadero | |
| 174 | Sri Lanka | Sri Lanka | Viren Nettasinghe | Badminton | Paris Trocadero | |
| 174 | Sri Lanka | Sri Lanka | Dilhani Lekamge | Athletics | Paris Trocadero | |
| 175 | Sweden | Suède | Peder Fredricson | Equestrian (jumping) | Paris Trocadero | |
| 175 | Sweden | Suède | Josefin Olsson | Sailing | Paris Trocadero | |
| 176 | Switzerland | Suisse | Nino Schurter | Cycling (Mountain bike) | Isolite | |
| 176 | Switzerland | Suisse | Nina Christen | Shooting | Isolite | |
| 177 | Suriname | Suriname | Irvin Hoost | Swimming | Sam | |
| 177 | Suriname | Suriname | Kaelyn Djoparto | Swimming | Sam | |
| 178 | Syria | République arabe syrienne | Amre Hamcho | Equestrian | Froufrou | |
| 178 | Syria | République arabe syrienne | Alisar Youssef | Athletics | Froufrou | |
| 179 | Tajikistan | Tadjikistan | Temur Rakhimov | Judo | Marcel Carné | |
| 179 | Tajikistan | Tadjikistan | Mijgona Samadova | Boxing | Marcel Carné | |
| 180 | Chinese Taipei | Chinese Taipei | Sun Chen | Breaking | Marcel Carné | |
| 180 | Chinese Taipei | Chinese Taipei | Tai Tzu-ying | Badminton | Marcel Carné | |
| 181 | Tanzania | République-Unie de Tanzanie | Andrew Thomas Mlugu | Judo | Marcel Carné | |
| 181 | Tanzania | République-Unie de Tanzanie | Sophia Latiff | Swimming | Marcel Carné | |
| 182 | Chad | Tchad | Israel Madaye | Archery | Marcel Carné | |
| 182 | Chad | Tchad | Demos Memneloum | Judo | Marcel Carné | |
| 183 | Czech Republic | Tchéquie | Lukáš Krpálek | Judo | Odeon | |
| 183 | Czech Republic | Tchéquie | Marie Horáčková | Archery | Odeon | |
| 184 | Thailand | Thaïlande | Puripol Boonson | Athletics | L'Ivoire | |
| 184 | Thailand | Thaïlande | Vareeraya Sukasem | Skateboarding | L'Ivoire | |
| 185 | Timor-Leste | République démocratique du Timor-Leste | Jolanio Guterres | Swimming | Acajou | |
| 185 | Timor-Leste | République démocratique du Timor-Leste | Ana da Costa da Silva Pinto Belo | Taekwondo | Acajou | |
| 186 | Togo | Togo | Eloi Adjavon | Triathlon | Acajou | |
| 186 | Togo | Togo | Naomi Akakpo | Athletics | Acajou | |
| 187 | Tonga | Tonga | Maleselo Fufofuka | Athletics | Acajou | |
| 187 | Tonga | Tonga | Noelani Day | Swimming | Acajou | |
| 188 | Trinidad and Tobago | Trinité-et-Tobago | Dylan Carter | Swimming | Acajou | |
| 188 | Trinidad and Tobago | Trinité-et-Tobago | Michelle-Lee Ahye | Athletics | Acajou | |
| 189 | Tunisia | Tunisie | Salim Jemai | Canoeing (slalom) | Sans-Souci | |
| 189 | Tunisia | Tunisie | Khadija Krimi | Rowing | Sans-Souci | |
| 190 | Turkey | Türkiye | Mete Gazoz | Archery | Sans-Souci | |
| 190 | Turkey | Türkiye | Busenaz Sürmeneli | Boxing | Sans-Souci | |
| 191 | Turkmenistan | Turkménistan | Serdar Rahimov | Judo | Paris en Scène | |
| 191 | Turkmenistan | Turkménistan | Maysa Pardayeva | Judo | Paris en Scène | |
| 192 | Tuvalu | Tuvalu | Karalo Maibuca | Athletics | Paris en Scène | |
| 192 | Tuvalu | Tuvalu | Temalini Manatoa | Athletics | Paris en Scène | |
| 193 | Ukraine | Ukraine | Mykhailo Romanchuk | Swimming | Paris en Scène | |
| 193 | Ukraine | Ukraine | Elina Svitolina | Tennis | Paris en Scène | |
| 194 | Uruguay | Uruguay | Emiliano Lasa | Athletics | Paris en Scène | |
| 194 | Uruguay | Uruguay | María Sara Grippoli | Taekwondo | Paris en Scène | |
| 195 | Vanuatu | Vanuatu | Hugo Cumbo | Judo | Imagine | |
| 195 | Vanuatu | Vanuatu | Priscilla Tommy | Table tennis | Imagine | |
| 196 | Venezuela | Venezuela | Julio Mayora | Weightlifting | La Guêpe Buissonnière | |
| 196 | Venezuela | Venezuela | Anriquelis Barrios | Judo | La Guêpe Buissonnière | |
| 197 | Virgin Islands | Îles Vierges américaines | Kruz Schembri | Fencing | Ivre | |
| 197 | Virgin Islands | Îles Vierges américaines | Natalia Kuipers | Swimming | Ivre | |
| 198 | British Virgin Islands | Îles Vierges britanniques | Thad Lettsome | Sailing | Ivre | |
| 198 | British Virgin Islands | Îles Vierges britanniques | Adaejah Hodge | Athletics | Ivre | |
| 199 | Vietnam | Vietnam | Lê Đức Phát | Badminton | Ivre | |
| 199 | Vietnam | Vietnam | Nguyễn Thị Thật | Cycling | Ivre | |
| 200 | Yemen | Yémen | Samer Al-Yafaee | Athletics | Ivre | |
| 201 | Zambia | Zambie | Muzala Samukonga | Athletics | Le Zouave de l'Alma | |
| 201 | Zambia | Zambie | Margaret Tembo | Boxing | Le Zouave de l'Alma | |
| 202 | Zimbabwe | Zimbabwe | Makanakaishe Charamba | Athletics | Le Zouave de l'Alma | |
| 202 | Zimbabwe | Zimbabwe | Paige van der Westhuizen | Swimming | Le Zouave de l'Alma | |
| 203 | Australia | Australie | Eddie Ockenden | Field hockey | Le Zouave de l'Alma | |
| 203 | Australia | Australie | Jessica Fox | Canoeing (slalom) | Le Zouave de l'Alma | |
| 204 | United States | États-Unis d'Amérique | LeBron James | Basketball | L'Espoir | |
| 204 | United States | États-Unis d'Amérique | Coco Gauff | Tennis | L'Espoir | |
| 205 | France | France | Florent Manaudou | Swimming | Paquebot | |
| 205 | France | France | Mélina Robert-Michon | Athletics | Paquebot | |

Notes

- Countries between Greece and Bahrain were presented on the Enchanté segment, then continued between Bangladesh and People's Republic of China
- Countries between Cyprus and Gabon were presented on the Fraternité segment, then continued between Gambia and Jamaica
- Countries between Japan and Norway were presented on the Sportivité segment
- Countries between New Zealand and the host nation France were presented on the Festivité segment

| Preceded by Tokyo | Summer Olympics Parade of Nations; Paris; XXXIII Olympics Summer Games (2024) | Succeeded by Los Angeles |
