= Mauritania at the 1992 Summer Olympics =

- IOC code: MTN
- NOC: Comité National Mauritanien

in Barcelona
- Competitors: 6 in 1 sport
- Medals: Gold 0 Silver 0 Bronze 0 Total 0

Summer Olympics appearances (overview)
- 1984; 1988; 1992; 1996; 2000; 2004; 2008; 2012; 2016; 2020; 2024

Mauritania competed at the 1992 Summer Olympics in Barcelona, Spain.

== Competitors ==
The following is the list of number of competitors in the Games.

Sport	Men	Women	Total
Athletics	6	0	6
Total	6	0	6

== Athletics ==
=== Key ===
- Note–Ranks given for track events are within the athlete's heat only
- Q = Qualified for the next round
- q = Qualified for the next round as a fastest loser or, in field events, by position without achieving the qualifying target
- NR = National record
- N/A = Round not applicable for the event
- Bye = Athlete not required to compete in round
- DNF = Did not finish

=== Men ===
Athlete	Event	Heat		Quarterfinal		Semifinal		Final	
Athlete	Event	Result	Rank	Result	Rank	Result	Rank	Result	Rank
Noureddine Ould Ménira	100 m	11.22	7	did not advance					
Boubout Dieng (Note: Boubout Dieng (Arabic: بوبوت دينغ; born 19 November 1961), competing in the ninth 200m heat, finished seventh and failed to advance, but his time was a personal best.)	200 m	22.75	7	did not advance					
Samba Fall (Note: Samba Fall (Arabic: سامبا فال; born 7 September 1964), competing in the eighth 400m heat, failed to advance with a time of 50.91; he set a personal best of 49.02 at a different competition that year.)	400 m.	50.91	7	did not advance					
Chérif Baba Aidara	800 m	1:56.41	6	n/a		did not advance			
Sid'Ahmed Ould Mohamedou	10000 m	DNF		n/a				did not advance	
Mohamed Ould Khalifa	marathon	n/a						DNF	

== Sources ==
- Official Olympic Reports
