= Mohamed Ould Khalifa =

Mauritanian long-distance runner (born 1968)

Personal information
- Nationality: Mauritanian
- Born: Mohamed Ould Khalifa; 6 May 1968 (age 58)

Sport
- Sport: Long-distance running

Mohamed Ould Khalifa (Arabic: محمد ولد خليفة; born 6 May 1968) is a Mauritanian long-distance runner. Khalifa would compete at the 1988 Summer Olympics, representing Mauritania in men's athletics. He competed in the heats of the men's 5000 metres. There, he finished seventeenth overall, setting a Mauritanian national record though did not advance further.

In 1991, Khalifa ran a marathon personal best of 3:04:33 hours and later qualified for the 1992 Summer Olympics, again representing the nation. He competed and started in the men's marathon but did not finish the course.

== Early life ==
Mohamed Ould Khalifa was born on 6 May 1968.

== Career ==
Khalifa would compete at the 1988 Summer Olympics in Seoul, South Korea, representing Mauritania in men's athletics.

At the 1988 Summer Games, Khalifa competed in the heats of the men's 5000 metres on 28 September against seventeen other competitors in his round. There, he recorded a time of 15:18.64 and placed seventeenth in his round and did not advance to the semifinals held the following day. Although he did not advance further, he had set a Mauritanian national record in the event which remained unbroken until it was broken by Abidine Abidine in 2020.

Three years later in 1991, Khalifa set a personal best in the men's marathon with a time of 3:04:33. A year later, he again represented Mauritania at the Olympics, competing at the 1992 Summer Olympics in Barcelona, Spain, in men's athletics. At the Summer Games, he competed in the men's marathon on 9 August against 109 other competitors. In the event, he did not finish the marathon and was unranked in the event.
