= Mauritania at the 2004 Summer Olympics =

- IOC code: MTN
- NOC: Comité National Mauritanien

in Athens
- Competitors: 2 in 1 sport
- Flag bearer: Youba Hmeida
- Medals: Gold 0 Silver 0 Bronze 0 Total 0

Summer Olympics appearances (overview)
- 1984; 1988; 1992; 1996; 2000; 2004; 2008; 2012; 2016; 2020; 2024

Mauritania competed at the 2004 Summer Olympics in Athens, Greece, from 13 to 29 August 2004. The country's participation at Athens marked its sixth appearance in the Summer Olympics since its debut in the 1984 Summer Olympics. The delegation included two track and field athletes, Youba Hmeida and Aminata Kamissoko, who were both selected by wildcards after both failed to meet either the "A" or "B" qualifying standards. Hmeida was selected as the flag bearer for the opening ceremony. Neither of the Mauritanians progressed beyond the heats.

== Background ==
Mauritania participated in six Summer Olympic games between its debut in the 1984 Summer Olympics in Los Angeles, United States and the 2004 Summer Olympics in Athens. The Mauritania National Olympic Committee (NOC) selected two athletes via wildcards. Usually, an NOC would be able to enter up to 3 qualified athletes in each individual event as long as each athlete met the "A" standard, or 1 athlete per event if they met the "B" standard. However, since Mauritania had no athletes that met either standard, they were allowed to select two athletes, one of each gender, as wildcards. The two athletes that were selected to compete in the Athens games were Youba Hmeida in the Men's 400 meters and Aminata Kamissoko in the Women's 100 meters. Hmeida was flag bearer for the opening ceremony.

== Athletics ==
Making his Summer Olympics debut, Youba Hmeida was notable for carrying the Mauritania flag at the opening ceremony. He qualified for the Summer Olympics via a wildcard place, as his best time, 47.87 seconds at the 2001 World Championships in Athletics 400 meters, was 1.92 seconds slower than the "B" standard required. He competed on 20 August in Heat 3 against seven other athletes. He ran a time of 49.18 seconds, finishing seventh after Russia's Anton Galkin was disqualified. El Salvador's Takeshi Fujiwara placed ahead of him (46.70 seconds), in a heat led by Cuba's Yeimer López (45.44 seconds). Out of 63 athletes, Hmeida ranked 57 and was 3.30 seconds behind the slowest athlete that progressed to the semi-finals. Therefore, that was the end of his competition. Competing at her first Summer Olympics, Aminata Kamissoko qualified after being granted a wildcard as her best time, 13.70 seconds in the 2003 World Championships in Athletics 100 meters, was 2.30 seconds slower than the "B" qualifying standard. She competed on August 20 in Heat 3 against seven other athletes, finishing last with a time of 13.49 seconds. Palau's Ngerak Florencio ranked ahead of her (12.76 seconds), in a heat led by United States' Lauryn Williams. Overall, Kamissoko was 2.06 seconds behind the slowest athlete that progressed, therefore not advancing to the quarter-finals.

Key

- Note–Ranks given for track events are within the athlete's heat only
- Q = Qualified for the next round
- q = Qualified for the next round as a fastest loser or, in field events, by position without achieving the qualifying target
- NR = National record
- N/A = Round not applicable for the event
- Bye = Athlete not required to compete in round

Men

| Athlete | Event | Heat | | Semifinal | | Final | |
| Athlete | Event | Result | Rank | Result | Rank | Result | Rank |
|---|---|---|---|---|---|---|---|
| Youba Hmeida | 400 m | 49.18 | 7 | did not advance | | | |

Women

| Athlete | Event | Heat | | Quarterfinal | | Semifinal | | Final | |
| Athlete | Event | Result | Rank | Result | Rank | Result | Rank | Result | Rank |
|---|---|---|---|---|---|---|---|---|---|
| Aminata Kamissoko | 100 m | 13.49 | 8 | did not advance | | | | | |

== See also ==
- Mauritania at the 2004 Summer Paralympics
