= Mauritania at the 1988 Summer Olympics =

- IOC code: MTN
- NOC: Comité National Mauritanien

in Seoul
- Competitors: 6 in 2 sports
- Flag bearer: Oumar Samba Sy
- Medals: Gold 0 Silver 0 Bronze 0 Total 0

Summer Olympics appearances (overview)
- 1984; 1988; 1992; 1996; 2000; 2004; 2008; 2012; 2016; 2020; 2024

Mauritania competed at the 1988 Summer Olympics in Seoul, South Korea.

== Competitors ==
The following is the list of number of competitors in the Games.

Sport	Men	Women	Total
Athletics	2	0	2
Wrestling	4	–	4
Total	6	0	6

== Athletics ==
Key

- Note–Ranks given for track events are within the athlete's heat only
- Q = Qualified for the next round
- q = Qualified for the next round as a fastest loser or, in field events, by position without achieving the qualifying target
- NR = National record
- N/A = Round not applicable for the event
- Bye = Athlete not required to compete in round

Men

Athlete	Event	Heat		Semifinal		Final	
Athlete	Event	Result	Rank	Result	Rank	Result	Rank
Mohamed Ould Khayar	1500 m	4:12.18	15	did not advance			
Mohamed Ould Khalifa	5000 m	15:18.64	17	did not advance			

== Wrestling ==
Key:

- VT - Victory by Fall.
- PP - Decision by Points - the loser with technical points.
- PO - Decision by Points - the loser without technical points.

Men's freestyle

Athlete	Event	Elimination Pool					Final / BM	
Athlete	Event	Opposition Result	Opposition Result	Opposition Result	Opposition Result	Rank	Opposition Result	Rank
Salem Ould Habib	−74 kg	Holmes (CAN); L 0-4	Enkhbayar (MGL); L 0-4	—		11	did not advance	
Samba Adama	-90 kg	Deskoulidis (GRE); L 0-4	English (GBR); L 0-4	—		12	did not advance	
Babacar Sar	-100 kg	Sione (ASA); W 4-0	Obwoge (KEN); W 4-0	Robotka (HUN); L 0-4	Karadushev (BUL); L 0-4	6	did not advance	

Men's Greco-Roman

Athlete	Event	Elimination Pool				Final / BM	
Athlete	Event	Opposition Result	Opposition Result	Opposition Result	Rank	Opposition Result	Rank
Samba Adama	−90 kg	Poikilidis (GRE); L 0-4	Komshev (BUL); L 0-4	—	8	did not advance	
Oumar Samba Sy	-100 kg	Obwoge (KEN); W 4-0	Sören Claeson (SWE); L 0-4	Withdrew	6	did not advance	
