= Mauritania at the 2012 Summer Olympics =

- IOC code: MTN
- NOC: Comité National Mauritanien

in London
- Competitors: 2 in 1 sport
- Flag bearer: Jidou El Moctar
- Medals: Gold 0 Silver 0 Bronze 0 Total 0

Summer Olympics appearances (overview)
- 1984; 1988; 1992; 1996; 2000; 2004; 2008; 2012; 2016; 2020; 2024

Mauritania competed at the 2012 Summer Olympics in London, which was held from 27 July to 12 August 2012. The country's participation at London marked its eighth appearance in the Summer Olympics since its debut in the 1984 Summer Olympics. The delegation included two track and field athletes, Jidou El Moctar and Aicha Fall, who were selected to the team by wildcard places, as the nation had no athletes that met either the "A" or "B" qualifying standards. Moctar was selected as flag bearer for the opening ceremony while a LOCOG Games Maker carried it for the closing ceremony. Neither of the two athletes progressed beyond the heats.

== Background ==
Mauritania participated in eight Summer Olympic Games between its debut in the 1984 Summer Olympics in Los Angeles, United States and the 2012 Summer Olympics in London. Mauritania would participate in the Summer Olympics from 27 July to 12 August 2012. The Mauritania National Olympic Committee (NOC) selected two athletes via wildcards. Usually, an NOC would be able to enter up to 3 qualified athletes in each individual event as long as each athlete met the "A" standard, or 1 athlete per event if they met the "B" standard. However, since Mauritania had no athletes that met either standard, they were allowed to select two athletes, one of each gender, as wildcards. The two athletes that were selected to compete in the London games were Jidou El Moctar, in the men's 200 meters and Aicha Fall in the women's 800 meters. Moctar was flag bearer for the opening ceremony and a LOCOG Games Maker held it for the closing ceremony.

== Athletics ==
Making his Summer Olympics debut, Jidou El Moctar was notable for carrying the Mauritania flag at the opening ceremony. He qualified for the Summer Olympics via a wildcard, as his best time, 23.16 seconds, was 2.51 seconds slower than the "B" qualifying standard for his event, the 200 meters. He competed on 7 August in Heat 1 against seven other athletes. He ran a time of 22.94 seconds, finishing last but achieving a personal best time. Kazakhstan's Vyacheslav Muravyev ranked ahead of him with a time of 21.75 seconds in a heat led by eventual gold medalist of the event, Jamaica's Usain Bolt (20.39 seconds). Overall, Moctar ranked 53rd out of 55 athletes competing and was 2.31 seconds behind the slowest athlete that progressed to the semi-finals. Therefore, that was the end of his competition.

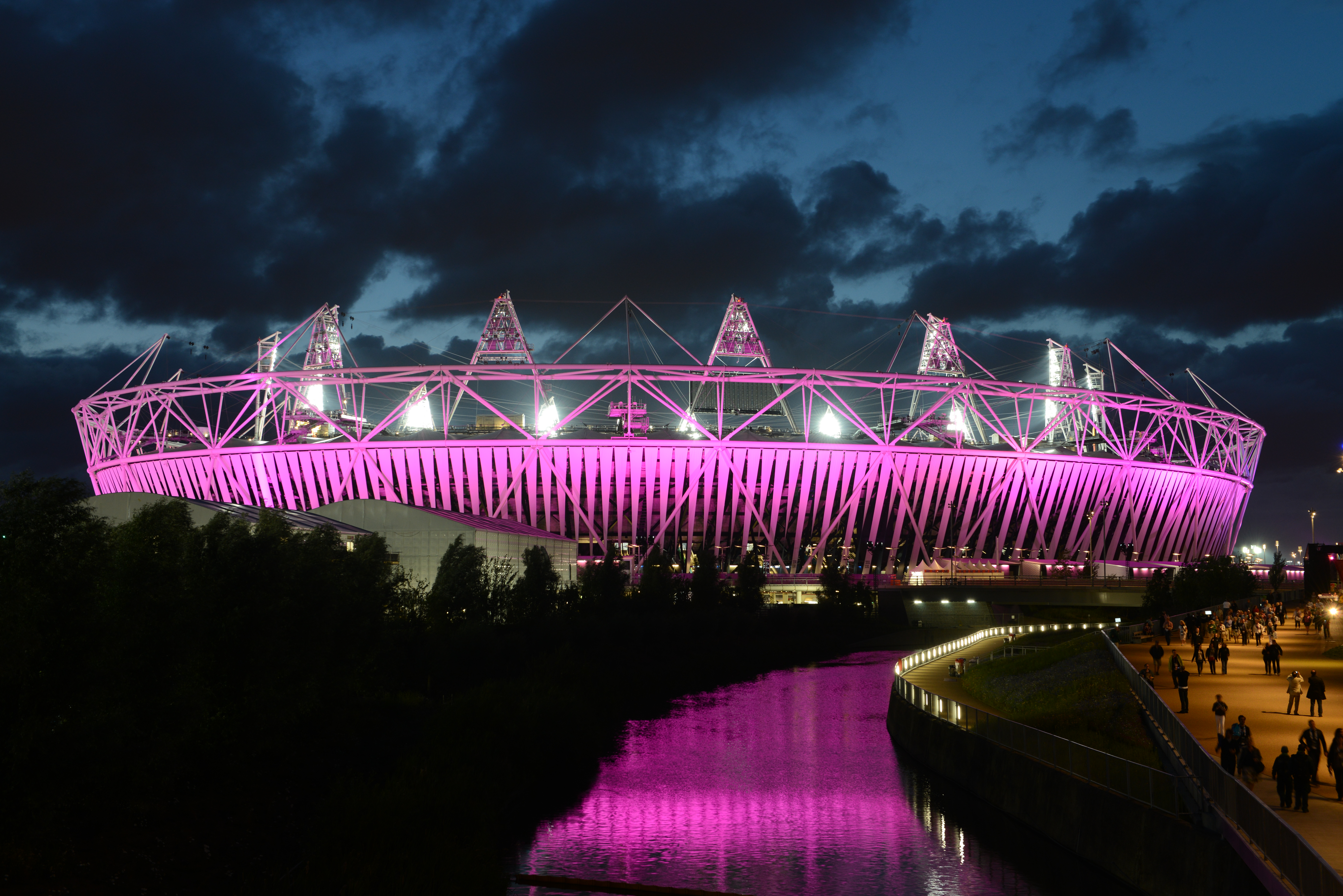
The London Olympic Stadium, where Moctar and Fall competed in track and field events

Competing at her first Summer Olympics, Aicha Fall qualified for the London Games as a wildcard, as she had set no time for her event, the 800 meters. She was to compete in the 2012 World Junior Championships in Athletics 800 meters but did not start the event. She competed on August 8 in Heat 5 against seven other athletes. She posted a time of 2 minutes and 27.97 seconds, finishing sixth and setting a national record in the process. She placed ahead of Palestine's Woroud Sawalha (2 minutes and 29.16 seconds) and behind Canada's Melissa Bishop (2 minutes and 09.33 seconds) in a heat led by Ukraine's Nataliia Lupu (2 minutes and 8.35 seconds). Overall, Fall was 24.12 seconds behind the slowest athlete that progressed to the semi-finals and therefore did not advance.

Key

- Note–Ranks given for track events are within the athlete's heat only
- Q = Qualified for the next round
- q = Qualified for the next round as a fastest loser or, in field events, by position without achieving the qualifying target
- NR = National record
- N/A = Round not applicable for the event
- Bye = Athlete not required to compete in round

Men

Athlete	Event	Heat		Semifinal		Final	
Athlete	Event	Result	Rank	Result	Rank	Result	Rank
Jidou El Moctar	200 m	22.94 PB	8	Did not advance			

Women

Athlete	Event	Heat		Semifinal		Final	
Athlete	Event	Result	Rank	Result	Rank	Result	Rank
Aicha Fall	800 m	2:27.97 NR	6	Did not advance			
