= Mauritania at the 2008 Summer Olympics =

- IOC code: MTN
- NOC: Comité National Mauritanien

in Beijing
- Competitors: 2 in 1 sports
- Flag bearer: Souleymane Ould Chebal
- Medals: Gold 0 Silver 0 Bronze 0 Total 0

Summer Olympics appearances (overview)
- 1984; 1988; 1992; 1996; 2000; 2004; 2008; 2012; 2016; 2020; 2024; 2028

Mauritania competed at the 2008 Summer Olympics which was held in Beijing, China. The country's participation at Beijing marked its seventh appearance in the Summer Olympics since its debut in the 1984 Summer Olympics. The delegation included two track and field athletes, Souleymane Ould Chebal and Bounkou Camara, who were both selected by wildcards after both failed to meet either the "A" or "B" qualifying standards. Chebal was selected as the flag bearer for the opening ceremony. Neither of the Mauritanians progressed beyond the heats.

== Background ==
Mauritania participated in seven Summer Olympic games between its debut in the 1984 Summer Olympics in Los Angeles, United States and the 2008 Summer Olympics in Beijing. Two athletes from Mauritania were selected to compete in the Beijing games; Souleymane Ould Chebal in the track and field 800 meters and Bounkou Camara in the track and field 100 meters. Both were selected by wildcard places as neither achieved the "A" or "B" qualifying standards for their respective events. Chebal was the flag bearer for the opening ceremony.

== Athletics ==
Souleymane Ould Chebal competed at the 2008 Summer Olympics in the 800 meters. He was notable for carrying the Mauritania flag at the opening ceremony. Making his debut at the Summer Olympics, he qualified via a wildcard place as his best time, 1:56.45 in the 2007 World Championships in Athletics 800 meters, was 9.45 seconds slower than the "B" qualifying standard required. He competed on 20 August against seven other athletes in heat five, finishing last out of the seven that finished with a time of 1 minute 57.43 seconds. He was 11.25 seconds slower than the winner of his heat Manuel Olmedo. Overall he finished 61st out of 65 athletes, (Note: Three athletes, Antar Zerguelaine, Bayron Piedra and Nicholas Willis did not start.) and was 10.91 seconds behind the slowest athlete that progressed to the next round and, therefore, that was the end of his competition.

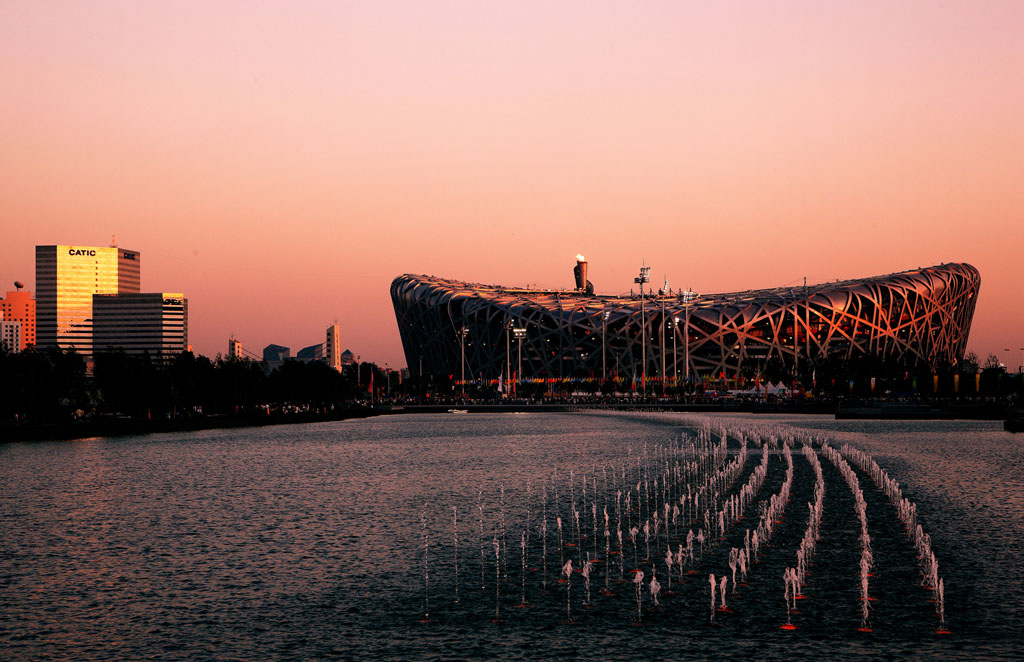
The Beijing National Stadium, where Chebal and Camara competed in track and field events

Competing at her first Olympics, Bounkou Camara qualified for the Summer Olympics via a wildcard place as her best time, 13.93 seconds in the 2007 World Championships in Athletics Women's 100 meters, was 2.51 seconds slower than the "B" qualifying standard required. She competed on August 16 in the third heat against eight other athletes, finishing last with a time of 13.69 seconds. She was 2.36 seconds slower than the winner of her heat Muna Lee. Overall Camara finished 79th out of 85 athletes and was 2.08 seconds behind the slowest athlete that progressed to the quarter-finals. Therefore, she did not advance.

Key

- Note–Ranks given for track events are within the athlete's heat only
- Q = Qualified for the next round
- q = Qualified for the next round as a fastest loser or, in field events, by position without achieving the qualifying target
- NR = National record
- N/A = Round not applicable for the event
- Bye = Athlete not required to compete in round

Men

Athlete	Event	Heat		Semifinal		Final	
Athlete	Event	Result	Rank	Result	Rank	Result	Rank
Souleymane Ould Chebal	800 m	1:57.43	7	did not advance			

Women

Athlete	Event	Heat		Quarterfinal		Semifinal		Final	
Athlete	Event	Result	Rank	Result	Rank	Result	Rank	Result	Rank
Bounkou Camara	100 m	13.69	6	did not advance					
