= Fatou Dieng =

Fatou Dieng may refer to:

- Fatou Dieng (athlete) (born 1983), Mauritanian sprint athlete
- Fatou Dieng (basketball) (born 1983), Senegalese basketball player
