= Mauritania at the 1984 Summer Olympics =

- IOC code: MTN
- NOC: Mauritanian National Olympic and Sports Committee

in Los Angeles
- Competitors: 2 in 1 sport
- Flag bearer: Oumar Samba Sy
- Medals: Gold 0 Silver 0 Bronze 0 Total 0

Summer Olympics appearances (overview)
- 1984; 1988; 1992; 1996; 2000; 2004; 2008; 2012; 2016; 2020; 2024

Mauritania was represented at the 1984 Summer Olympics in Los Angeles, California, United States by the Mauritanian National Olympic and Sports Committee. It was the nation's first appearance at the Olympics.

In total, two athletes – both men – represented Mauritania in one sport: wrestling.

== Background ==
A provisional Olympic committee for Mauritania was formed in 1962 before the Mauritanian National Olympic and Sports Committee was founded in 1977. It was full recognised by the International Olympic Committee in 1980 but, as they took part in the United States-led boycott of the 1980 Summer Olympics in Moscow, Russian Soviet Federative Socialist Republic, Soviet Union, Mauritania would not make its Olympic debut until the 1984 Summer Olympics in Los Angeles, California, United States.

== Competitors ==
In total, two athletes represented Mauritania at the 1984 Summer Olympics in Los Angeles, California, United States in one sport.

Sport	Men	Women	Total
Wrestling	2	—	2
Total	2	0	2

== Wrestling ==
In total, two Mauritanian athletes participated in the wrestling events – Mamadou Diallo in the freestyle –90 kg category and Oumar Samba Sy in the freestyle –100 kg category.

The wrestling events took place at the Anaheim Convention Center in Anaheim, California from 30 July to 11 August 1984.

Athlete	Event	Elimination Pool				Quarterfinal	Semifinal	Final / BM	
Athlete	Event	Opposition Result	Opposition Result	Opposition Result	Rank	Opposition Result	Opposition Result	Opposition Result	Rank
Mamadou Diallo	−90 kg	Appah (NGR); L 1-3	Loban (GBR); L 0-4	—N/a	8	did not advance			
Oumar Samba Sy	-100 kg	Poikilidis (GRE); L 0-3	Withdrew						

== Aftermath ==
Following their Olympic debut, Mauritania became a regular competitor at the Olympics. They sent a record delegation of six athletes to the subsequent two games – the 1988 Summer Olympics in Seoul, South Korea and the 1992 Summer Olympics in Barcelona, Spain. As of the 2024 Summer Olympics in Paris, France, Mauritania has not won an Olympic medal.
