= Mauritania at the 2012 Summer Paralympics =

- IPC code: MTN
- NPC: Fédération Mauritanienne de Sport pour Handicapés

in London
- Competitors: 2 in 1 sport
- Flag bearer: Lehbib Yehdiha
- Medals: Gold 0 Silver 0 Bronze 0 Total 0

Summer Paralympics appearances (overview)
- 2000; 2004; 2008; 2012; 2016–2024

Mauritania competed at the 2012 Summer Paralympics in London, United Kingdom from August 29 to September 9, 2012. Two track and field athletes, one male and one female, took part in shot put and javelin throw events respectively.

== Athletics ==
Athlete	Event	Mark	Points	Rank
Sidi Mohamed Bilal	Men's shot put F57-58	5.63	115	18
Fatimetou Mbodj	Women's javelin throw F57-58	7.59	23	18

== See also ==
- Mauritania at the Paralympics
- Mauritania at the 2012 Summer Olympics
