= Mauritania at the Olympics =

- IOC code: MTN
- NOC: Comité National Mauritanien
- Medals: Gold 0 Silver 0 Bronze 0 Total 0

Summer appearances
- 1984; 1988; 1992; 1996; 2000; 2004; 2008; 2012; 2016; 2020; 2024

Mauritania has sent athletes to compete in every Summer Olympic Games since 1984, and has yet to win an Olympic medal. The nation hasn’t participated in any Winter Olympic Games.

The National Olympic Committee was formed in 1962 and recognized by the International Olympic Committee in 1979. Mauritania's debut female Olympian was Fatou Dieng, who competed in the 2000 Summer Olympics.

== Medal tables ==
=== Medals by Summer Games ===
Games	Athletes	Gold	Silver	Bronze	Total	Rank
1984 Los Angeles	2	0	0	0	0	–
1988 Seoul	6	0	0	0	0	–
1992 Barcelona	6	0	0	0	0	–
1996 Atlanta	4	0	0	0	0	–
2000 Sydney	2	0	0	0	0	–
2004 Athens	2	0	0	0	0	–
2008 Beijing	2	0	0	0	0	–
2012 London	2	0	0	0	0	–
2016 Rio de Janeiro	2	0	0	0	0	–
2020 Tokyo	2	0	0	0	0	–
2024 Paris	2	0	0	0	0	–
2028 Los Angeles	future event					
2032 Brisbane	future event					
Total		0	0	0	0	–

== Flag bearers ==
This is a list of flag bearers who have represented Mauritania at the Olympics.

Flag bearers carry the national flag of their country at the opening ceremony of the Olympic Games.

#	Event year	Season	Flag bearer	Sport
1	1984	Summer	Oumar Samba Sy	Wrestling
2	1988	Summer	Oumar Samba Sy	Wrestling
3	1992	Summer		
4	1996	Summer	Noureddine Ould Ménira (Note: Ménira claimed he never actually got to hold the flag, as national officials gave it to another unidentified individual.)	Athletics
5	2000	Summer	Sidi Mohamed Ould Bidjel	Athletics
6	2004	Summer	Youba Ould H'Meïde	Athletics
7	2008	Summer	Souleymane Ould Chebal	Athletics
8	2012	Summer	Jidou El Moctar	Athletics
9	2016	Summer	Jidou El Moctar	Athletics
10	2020	Summer	Abidine Abidine	Athletics
10	2020	Summer	Houlèye Ba	Athletics
11	2024	Summer	Salam Bouha Ahamdy	Athletics
11	2024	Summer	Camil Doua	Swimming

== See also ==
- Mauritania at the Paralympics
