= Athletics at the 2020 Summer Olympics – Men's 5000 metres =

Men's 5000 metres at the Games of the XXXII Olympiad
- Olympic Athletics
- Venue: Japan National Stadium
- Dates: 3 August 2021 (heats); 6 August 2021 (final)
- Competitors: 38 from 23 nations
- Winning time: 12:58.15

Medalists
1st place, gold medalist(s)		Joshua Cheptegei	Uganda
2nd place, silver medalist(s)		Mohammed Ahmed	Canada
3rd place, bronze medalist(s)		Paul Chelimo	United States

Official Video Highlights

The men's 5000 metres event at the 2020 Summer Olympics took place on 3 and 6 August 2021 at the Japan National Stadium. Approximately 45 athletes competed; the exact number was dependent on how many nations use universality places to enter athletes in addition to the 42 qualifying through time or ranking (6 universality places were used in 2016). The winning margin was 0.46 seconds.

== Summary ==
After setting the world record in what was practically a time trial in 2020, Joshua Cheptegei was the clear favorite. Mo Farah, the London 2012 and Rio 2016 Olympic champion, had failed to meet the Olympic qualifying standard. Bronze medalist Hagos Gebrhiwet also did not return, but silver medalist Paul Chelimo was back for another go. None of the Ethiopian medalists from the World Championships attended, but the Canadian World Championship bronze medalist, Mohammed Ahmed, did take part. A further potential contendor was the find of the season, Mohamed Katir, who ran historic times in the 1500, 3000 and 5000 in the lead-up to the Olympics.

From the start of the final, Cheptegei took the lead, marked by Milkesa Mengesha while several other contenders took their looks at the leader. After two laps, Jacob Kiplimo worked his way through the pack and Cheptegei gave way to his teammate. Cheptegei dropped back a few places while Chelimo took Kiplimo seriously and moved into marking position just ahead of Mengesha. The lead group of Kiplimo, Chelimo, Mengesha, Nicholas Kimeli and Cheptegei stayed in order for four laps, while the rest of the field was in single file behind them. Half way through the race, Kiplimo's pace slowed slightly and Cheptegei moved back up to the front to keep pushing. After another lap, the pack began to bunch up again, half the field moving into lane 2 to have room to maneuver, Kimeli immediately to Cheptegei's right side. After a half lap to think about it, Kimeli moved ahead, then marked by Mengesha. Just before three laps to go, Chelimo ran around the crowd to take the lead, which only lasted for half a lap before Kimeli and Mengesha restored order. The lead group was down to 9, the runners packed so tight there was some jostling and pushing, Chelimo losing his balance but staying on his feet. Out of the jostling, Cheptegei was back on point with 500m to go. Kimeli made a rush at the bell to be second over the line ahead of Chelimo. The front six had dropped the others, Kiplimo, Ahmed and Birhanu Balew. Balew fell off on the backstretch, and as Chelimo and Ahmed cued up behind Kimeli, Kiplimo was off the back in the turn. Kimeli went wide off the turn, possibly thinking he can run down Cheptegei. Chelimo saw the opportunity and passed on the inside, Ahmed on his heels. Then Ahmed passed Chelimo on the inside and went off in chase of Cheptegei. But there was not enough real estate before Cheptegei crossed the finish line, followed by Ahmed. Behind them, Kimeli came back on Chelimo. Both were racing side by side for the bronze. First Kimeli had a few inches, then Chelimo regained the edge. Five metres out from the finish, the exhausted Chelimo stumbled, the quick steps causing him to get ahead of Kimeli. He managed two more steps falling forward across the line before crashing to the track, Chelimo's off balance angle crossing the line the difference to give him the bronze.

== Background ==
This was the 25th time the event was held, having appeared at every Olympics since 1912.

== Qualification ==
A National Olympic Committee (NOC) could enter up to 3 qualified athletes in the men's 5000 metres event if all athletes meet the entry standard or qualify by ranking during the qualifying period. (The limit of 3 has been in place since the 1930 Olympic Congress.) The qualifying standard is 13:13.50. This standard was "set for the sole purpose of qualifying athletes with exceptional performances unable to qualify through the IAAF World Rankings pathway." The world rankings, based on the average of the best five results for the athlete over the qualifying period and weighted by the importance of the meet, will then be used to qualify athletes until the cap of 42 is reached.

The qualifying period was originally from 1 May 2019 to 29 June 2020. Due to the COVID-19 pandemic, the period was suspended from 6 April 2020 to 30 November 2020, with the end date extended to 29 June 2021. The world rankings period start date was also changed from 1 May 2019 to 30 June 2020; athletes who had met the qualifying standard during that time were still qualified, but those using world rankings would not be able to count performances during that time. The qualifying time standards could be obtained in various meets during the given period that have the approval of the IAAF. Both indoor and outdoor meets were eligible for qualifying. The most recent Area Championships may be counted in the ranking, even if not during the qualifying period.

NOCs can also use their universality place—each NOC can enter one male athlete regardless of time if they had no male athletes meeting the entry standard for an athletics event—in the 5000 metres.

=== Men's 5000 m ===
Entry number: 42. 4 withdrew after qualification ended, 2 universality places.

Qualification standard	No. of athletes	NOC	Nominated athletes
Entry standard – 13:13.50	3	Canada	Mohammed Ahmed; Luc Bruchet; Justyn Knight
Entry standard – 13:13.50	3	Ethiopia	Nibret Melak; Milkesa Mengesha; Getnet Wale
Entry standard – 13:13.50	3	Kenya	Samuel Chebole; Daniel Ebenyo; Nicholas Kimeli
Entry standard – 13:13.50	3	Uganda	Oscar Chelimo; Joshua Cheptegei; Jacob Kiplimo
Entry standard – 13:13.50	3	United States	Paul Chelimo; Grant Fisher; Woody Kincaid
Entry standard – 13:13.50	2	Australia	David McNeill; Patrick Tiernan
Entry standard – 13:13.50	2	Bahrain	Birhanu Balew; Dawit Fikadu
Entry standard – 13:13.50	2	France	Jimmy Gressier; Hugo Hay
Entry standard – 13:13.50	2	Great Britain	Andrew Butchart; Marc Scott
Entry standard – 13:13.50	0	Norway	~~Jakob Ingebrigtsen~~
Entry standard – 13:13.50	1	Belgium	Isaac Kimeli
Entry standard – 13:13.50	1	Guatemala	Luis Grijalva
Entry standard – 13:13.50	1	Italy	Yemaneberhan Crippa
Entry standard – 13:13.50	1	South Africa	Lesiba Precious Mashele
Entry standard – 13:13.50	1	Spain	Mohamed Katir
World ranking	2	Japan	Yuta Bando; Hiroki Matsueda
World ranking	1	Morocco	Soufiyan Bouqantar; ~~Zouhair Talbi~~
World ranking	1	Switzerland	Jonas Raess; ~~Julien Wanders~~
World ranking	1	Australia	Morgan McDonald
World ranking	1	Belgium	Robin Hendrix
World ranking	1	Germany	Mohamed Mohumed
World ranking	1	Netherlands	Mike Foppen
World ranking	1	Norway	Narve Gilje Nordås
World ranking	0	Spain	~~Carlos Mayo~~
Universality Places	1	Kyrgyzstan	Nursultan Keneshbekov
Universality Places	1	Mauritania	Abidine Abidine
Invitational Places	1	Refugee Olympic Team	Jamal Abdelmaji Eisa Mohammed
Total	40		

== Competition format ==
The event continued to use the two-round format introduced in 2012.

== Records ==
Prior to this competition, the existing global and area records were as follows:

World record	Joshua Cheptegei (UGA)	12:35.36	Fontvieille, Monaco	14 August 2020
Olympic record	Kenenisa Bekele (ETH)	12:57.82	Beijing, China	23 August 2008
World Leading	Jakob Ingebrigtsen (NOR)	12:48.45	Florence, Italy	10 June 2021

Area
Area	Time (s)	Athlete	Nation
Africa (records)	12:35.36 WR	Joshua Cheptegei	Uganda
Asia (records)	12:51.96	Albert Rop	Bahrain
Europe (records)	12:48.45	Jakob Ingebrigtsen	Norway
North, Central America and Caribbean (records)	12:47.20	Mohammed Ahmed	Canada
Oceania (records)	12:55.76	Craig Mottram	Australia
South America (records)	13:19.43	Marilson dos Santos	Brazil

The following national records were established during the competition:

Country	Athlete	Round	Time	Notes
Guatemala	Luis Grijalva (GUA)	Final	13:10.09	

== Schedule ==
All times are Japan Standard Time (UTC+9)

The men's 5000 metres took place over two separate days.

Date	Time	Round
Tuesday, 3 August 2021	19:00	Round 1
Friday, 6 August 2021	19:50	Final

== Results ==
=== Round 1 ===
Qualification Rules: First 5 in each heat (Q) and the next 5 fastest (q) advance to the Final.

==== Heat 1 ====
Rank	Athlete	Nation	Time	Notes
1	Nicholas Kimeli	Kenya	13:38.87	Q
2	Mohammed Ahmed	Canada	13:38.96	Q
3	Woody Kincaid	United States	13:39.04	Q
4	Oscar Chelimo	Uganda	13:39.07	Q
5	Birhanu Balew	Bahrain	13:39.42	Q
6	Marc Scott	Great Britain	13:39.61	
7	Hugo Hay	France	13:39.95	
8	David McNeill	Australia	13:39.97	
9	Getnet Wale	Ethiopia	13:41.13	
10	Daniel Ebenyo	Kenya	13:41.64	
11	Jonas Raess	Switzerland	13:43.52	
12	Soufiyan Bouqantar	Morocco	13:43.97	
13	Lucas Bruchet	Canada	13:44.08	
14	Nibret Melak	Ethiopia	13:45.81	
15	Yemaneberhan Crippa	Italy	13:47.12	
16	Robin Hendrix	Belgium	13:58.37	
17	Yuta Bando	Japan	14:05.80	
18	Nursultan Keneshbekov	Kyrgyzstan	14:07.79	
19	Abidine Abidine	Mauritania	14:54.80	PB
	Mike Foppen	Netherlands	DNF	

==== Heat 2 ====
Rank	Athlete	Nation	Time	Notes
1	Mohamed Katir	Spain	13:30.10	Q
2	Paul Chelimo	United States	13:30.15	Q
3	Justyn Knight	Canada	13:30.22	Q
4	Jacob Kiplimo	Uganda	13:30.40	Q
5	Joshua Cheptegei	Uganda	13:30.61	Q
6	Milkesa Mengesha	Ethiopia	13:31.13	q
7	Andrew Butchart	Great Britain	13:31.23	q
8	Grant Fisher	United States	13:31.80	q
9	Jimmy Gressier	France	13:33.47	q
10	Luis Grijalva	Guatemala	13:34.11	q
11	Morgan McDonald	Australia	13:37.36	
12	Narve Gilje Nordås	Norway	13:41.82	
13	Jamal Abdelmaji Eisa Mohammed	Refugee Olympic Team	13:42.98	PB
14	Dawit Fikadu	Bahrain	13:44.03	SB, qR
15	Lesiba Precious Mashele	South Africa	13:48.25	
16	Mohamed Mohumed	Germany	13:50.46	
17	Isaac Kimeli	Belgium	13:57.36	
18	Hiroki Matsueda	Japan	14:15.54	
	Samwel Masai	Kenya		DNS
	Patrick Tiernan	Australia		DNS

=== Final ===
Rank	Athlete	Nation	Time	Notes
1st place, gold medalist(s)	Joshua Cheptegei	Uganda	12:58.15	
2nd place, silver medalist(s)	Mohammed Ahmed	Canada	12:58.61	
3rd place, bronze medalist(s)	Paul Chelimo	United States	12:59.05	SB
4	Nicholas Kipkorir Kimeli	Kenya	12:59.17	SB
5	Jacob Kiplimo	Uganda	13:02.40	
6	Birhanu Balew	Bahrain	13:03.20	
7	Justyn Knight	Canada	13:04.38	
8	Mohamed Katir	Spain	13:06.60	
9	Grant Fisher	United States	13:08.40	
10	Milkesa Mengesha	Ethiopia	13:08.50	
11	Andrew Butchart	Great Britain	13:09.97	SB
12	Luis Grijalva	Guatemala	13:10.09	NR
13	Jimmy Gressier	France	13:11.33	
14	Woody Kincaid	United States	13:17.20	SB
15	Dawit Fikadu	Bahrain	13:20.24	SB
16	Oscar Chelimo	Uganda	13:44.45	
