= Mauritania at the Paralympics =

- IPC code: MTN
- NPC: Fédération Mauritanienne de Sport pour Handicapés
- Medals: Gold 0 Silver 0 Bronze 0 Total 0

Summer appearances
- 2000; 2004; 2008; 2012; 2016–2024

Mauritania made its Paralympic Games début at the 2000 Summer Paralympics in Sydney. It was represented by a female sprinter (Ezouha Mint Mohamed) and a male powerlifter (Mohamed Ould Bahaida). The country competed again in 2004, with runner Ezzouha Edidal as its sole representative.

Mauritania did not take part in the 2008 Summer Paralympics, and has never participated in the Winter Paralympics. No Mauritanian has ever won a Paralympic medal.

== Medal tables ==
Games	Athletes	Gold	Silver	Bronze	Total	Rank
2000 Sydney	2	0	0	0	0	–
2004 Athens	1	0	0	0	0	–
2012 London	2	0	0	0	0	–
Total		0	0	0	0	–

== See also ==
- Mauritania at the Olympics
