= Mauritania at the 2004 Summer Paralympics =

- IPC code: MTN
- NPC: Fédération Mauritanienne de Sport pour Handicapés

in Athens
- Competitors: 1 in 1 sport
- Flag bearer: Ezzouha Edidal
- Medals: Gold 0 Silver 0 Bronze 0 Total 0

Summer Paralympics appearances (overview)
- 2000; 2004; 2008; 2012; 2016–2024

Mauritania competed at the 2004 Summer Paralympics in Athens, Greece. The country's delegation consisted of a single competitor, Ezzouha Edidal. Edidal competed in one track and field athletics event and did not win a medal.

== Athletics ==
=== Women's track ===
Athlete	Event	Heats		Final	
Athlete	Event	Result	Rank	Result	Rank
Ezzouha Edidal	Women's 400 m T54	1:28.75	5	did not advance	

== See also ==
- Mauritania at the Paralympics
- Mauritania at the 2004 Summer Olympics
