= Souleyman Chebal Moctar =

Mauritanian middle-distance runner

Souleyman Chebal Moctar (born 31 December 1986), also spelled Souleyman Ould Chebal, Souleymane Ould Chebal, or Souleymane Ould Chebel, is a track athlete from Mauritania. His specialty is the 800 metres. At the 2008 Beijing Olympics, he was the Mauritania team's flagbearer and finished 7th in his 800 m heat.

Moctar's time of 1:55.65 still stands as a Mauritanian national record in the 800 metres.

Olympic Games
| Preceded by Youba Ould H'Meïde | Flagbearer for Mauritania; 2008 Beijing | Succeeded by Jidou El Moctar |
