= Bouha Sidi =

Mauritanian athlete (born 2000)

Salam Bouha Ahamdy
Personal information
- Nationality: Mauritanian
- Born: 30 August 2000 (age 25)

Sport
- Sport: Athletics
- Event: 100 metres

Salam Bouha Ahamdy Sidi (Arabic: سلم أحمدي بوها / بوها سيدي / سلام بوها أحمدي سيدي; born 30 August 2000), also known as Bouha Sidi, is a Mauritian sprinter. She competed at the 2024 Paris Olympics in the 100 metres.

== Early life ==
Ahamdy was born on 30 August 2000. She trained in Nouakchott at the Nouakchott Olympic Stadium. Ahamdy was coached by 2010 European 200 m champion Myriam Soumaré, who represented France but was also of Mauritanian descent. Soumaré would accompany Ahamdy to the 2024 Olympics. She was overseen by the president of the Mauritanian Olympic Committee, Abdelrahman Othman, who contracted her coach and organized additional training for Ahamdy in France.

== Career ==
Before the Olympics, Ahamdy participated in a competition organized by the Mauritanian National Olympic and Sports Committee to test her preparation.

She was selected for the 2024 Paris Olympics to compete in the 100 metres. She arrived in Paris on 22 July and was also her country's flag bearer at the opening ceremony of the games. Ahamdy was making her first appearance at the games. She qualified via universality place. She competed on 2 August 2024, bring drawn in heat one in the preliminaries. Ahamdy finished eight out of nine athletes in her heat and 33rd overall with a time of 13.71 seconds, failing to qualify for the heats round. During her race, one of her competitors, Lucia Moris of South Sudan, fell to the ground after a leg injury. After Ahamdy finished her race she came over to help Moris.

Ahamdy was dissatisfied with her 100 m Olympic performance.

Olympic Games
Preceded by Abidine Abidine; Houlèye Ba	Flag bearer for Mauritania; Paris 2024 with Camil Doua	Succeeded by Incumbent
