= Lesiba Precious Mashele =

South African long-distance runner

Personal information
- Born: 13 October 1990 (age 35)

Sport
- Country: South Africa
- Sport: Athletics
- Event: Long-distance running

Lesiba Precious Mashele (born 13 October 1990) is a South African long-distance runner.

In 2018, he competed in the men's half marathon at the 2018 IAAF World Half Marathon Championships held in Valencia, Spain. He finished in 44th place.

In 2020, he competed in the men's race at the 2020 World Athletics Half Marathon Championships held in Gdynia, Poland.

He competed in the men's 5000 metres event at the 2020 Summer Olympics held in Tokyo, Japan.
