= Mauritania at the 2000 Summer Paralympics =

- IPC code: MTN
- NPC: Fédération Mauritanienne de Sport pour Handicapés

in Sydney
- Competitors: 2 in 2 sports
- Medals: Gold 0 Silver 0 Bronze 0 Total 0

Summer Paralympics appearances (overview)
- 2000; 2004; 2008; 2012; 2016–2024

There was one female and one male athlete representing Mauritania at the 2000 Summer Paralympics.

== Events ==
=== Athletics ===
Women–track

Athlete	Event	Heats		Final	
Athlete	Event	Result	Rank	Result	Rank
Ezouha Mint Mohamed	100 m T54	21.43	9	did not advance	

=== Powerlifting ===
Men

Athlete	Event	Heats		Final	
Athlete	Event	Result	Rank	Result	Rank
Mohamed Ould Bahaida	+67.5 kg	—		70	16

== See also ==
- 2000 Summer Paralympics

== Bibliography ==
- International Paralympic Committee (2000). "Appendix C: Athlete Numbers - By Delegation". Sydney 2000 Paralympic Games Post Games Report. Sydney.
