= Bounkou Camara =

Mauritanian sprinter

Bounkou Camara (Arabic: بونكو كامارا) also written as Bonko Camara (born February 6, 1988) is a track and field sprint athlete who competes internationally for Mauritania.

Camara competed at the 2007 World Championships in Athletics in Osaka. She competed in the 100 meter event and was eliminated in heat 8 with a time of 13.93 seconds.

Camara represented Mauritania at the 2008 Summer Olympics in Beijing. She competed in the 100 metres sprint and placed 9th in her heat without advancing to the second round. She ran the distance in a time of 13.69 seconds.

At the 2011 World Championships in Athletics in Daegu, South Korea, Camara ran the 100 meters race in 14.05 seconds and was eliminated in the heat, finishing 34th. At the 2011 All-Africa Games in Maputo, she ran her race in 14.20 seconds, finishing 9th in the race and being eliminated in the heats. She afterwards retired from athletics.

In 2025, she became the first female Mauritanian international trainer, receiving her CAF-B certificate.
