= Noureddine Ould Ménira =

Personal information
- Born: May 6, 1968 (age 58)

Achievements and titles
- Personal best: 100 m: 10.4 (1994)

Noureddine Ould Ménira (Arabic: نور الدين ولد منيره; born 6 May 1968) is a Mauritanian Olympic sprinter.

== Biography ==
Ménira competed in two Summer Olympics and one World Championship, breaking the Mauritanian national record several times during his career. At the 1992 Summer Olympics, he competed in the 100 metres, finishing 7th in his heat in a time of 11.22 seconds and failing to advance to the next round.

At the 1993 World Championships in Athletics, Ménira competed in the 100 metres, running 10.96 seconds to place 8th in his heat.

Ménira set his 100 m personal best of 10.4 seconds in 1994. He also competed in the 200 m at the 1994 Francophone Games for Mauritania, he finished 3rd in his heat, missing out on a spot in the semi-finals by just one place.

In 1995, Ménira competed at the West and North African Athletics Championships in Dakar, Senegal, where he qualified for the 200 metres finals.

At the 1996 Summer Olympics in Atlanta, Ménira qualified in both the 100 m and 200 m races. In the 100 m, he ran a time of 10.95 seconds for 8th in his heat and failed to advance. He ran 22.71 seconds in his 200 m heat to place 8th as well.

Ménira was said to have been given resources by the International Olympic Committee, but he did not receive them from his national committee after several years. He was officially designated as the Mauritanian flag-bearer at the 1996 Summer Olympics Parade of Nations, but he claims he never actually got to hold the flag, as it was given to another person. American official Evelyn Marshall encouraged Ménira to file a complaint against his national governing body to address the issues, but he declined to take action.

Olympic Games
Preceded by Unknown	Flagbearer for Mauritania; 1996 Atlanta	Succeeded by Sidi Mohamed Ould Bidjel
