= Houlèye Ba =

Mauritanian middle-distance runner

Houleye Ba
Personal information
- Nationality: Mauritania
- Born: Houleye Ba; 17 July 1992 (age 33)

Sport
- Sport: Athletics
- Event(s): 100 metres, 800 metres

Houleye Ba (born July 17, 1992) is a Mauritanian middle-distance runner.

She competed at the 2016 Summer Olympics in the women's 800 metres race; her time of 2:43.52 in the heats did not qualify her for the semifinals. At the 2020 Summer Games she ran in the 100 metres and ran a time of 15.26 which was a personal best.

Olympic Games
| Preceded by Jidou El Moctar | Flag bearer for Mauritania; Tokyo 2020 with Abidine Abidine | Succeeded by Salam Bouha Ahamdy; Camil Doua |
