= Youba Hmeida =

Mauritanian sprinter

Personal information
- Full name: Youba Mohamed Ould; H'meïde
- Nationality: Mauritania
- Born: 1 January 1976 (age 50) Nouakchott, Mauritania
- Height: 1.79 m (5 ft 10 1/2 in)
- Weight: 67 kg (148 lb)

Sport
- Sport: Athletics
- Event: Sprint

Achievements and titles
- Personal best: 400 m: 47.87 (2001)

Youba Mohamed Ould H'meïde (also Youba Hmeida, Arabic: يوبا محمد ولد حميدة; born January 1, 1976, in Nouakchott) is a retired Mauritanian sprinter, who specialized in the 400 metres. He represented Mauritania at the 2004 Summer Olympics, and also set a national record and a personal best of 47.87 on his sporting debut from the 2001 IAAF World Championships in Edmonton, Alberta, Canada.

Hmeida qualified for the Mauritanian squad in the men's 400 metres at the 2004 Summer Olympics in Athens by receiving a wild card entry slot from IAAF. Running against seven other athletes in heat three, Hmeida crossed the finish line in last place by more than three seconds behind leader Anton Galkin of Russia with a time of 49.18. Hmeida failed to advance into the semifinals as he placed farther from two automatic slots for the next round and ranked no. 58 overall in the prelims. Hmeida was appointed as the Mauritanian flag bearer by the National Olympic Committee (French: Comité National Mauritanien) in the opening ceremony.
