= Abidine Abidine =

Mauritanian long-distance runner (born 1993)

Personal information
- Nationality: Mauritanian
- Born: 31 March 1993 (age 33)

Sport
- Sport: Athletics
- Event: Long-distance running

Abidine Abidine (born 31 March 1993) is a Mauritanian long-distance runner. He competed in the 5000 metres event at the 2020 Summer Olympics.

== Career ==
In 2017, Abidine competed at the 2017 Islamic Solidarity Games, finishing 12th in the 5000 metres final.

In August 2019 at the 2019 African Games, Abidine represented Mauritania in the 5000 metres and finished in 27th place with a time of 15:52.09.

Abidine was the flag bearer for Mauritania during the 2020 Summer Olympics Parade of Nations.

Olympic Games
Preceded by Jidou El Moctar	Flag bearer for Mauritania; Tokyo 2020 with Houlèye Ba	Succeeded by Salam Bouha Ahamdy; Camil Doua
