= List of Mauritanian records in athletics =

The following are the national records in athletics in Mauritania maintained by Mauritania's national athletics federation: Federation d'Athletisme R.I Mauritanie (FARIM).

== Outdoor ==
Key to tables: Awaiting ratification Record not kept by FARIM Not ratified or later rescinded by FARIM

=== Men ===
Event	Record	Athlete	Date	Meet	Place	Ref.
100 m	10.74 (+0.7 m/s)	Cheikh Diagana	11 July 2006		Antony, France	
200 m	21.40 (+1.6 m/s)	Cheikh Diagana	24 June 2006		Hérouville, France	
400 m	47.87	Ould Mohamed Youba	4 August 2001	World Championships	Edmonton, Canada	
800 m	1:55.65	Souleymane Ould Chebel	3 June 2007		Bissau, Guinea-Bissau	
1500 m	3:50.25	Mohamed Elbendir	6 July 2005		Salamanca, Spain	
3000 m	8:17.14	Mohamed Beirouk	7 June 2014		Duffel, Belgium	
5000 m	14:05.58	Mohamed Elbendir Kathari	28 May 2005		Avilés, Spain	
10,000 m	33:04.49	Ismaël Ould Adermaz	5 August 1995	World Championships	Gothenburg, Sweden	
Half marathon	1:19:03	Chérif Ahmed Ould Taleb	5 March 2010	Nouakchott Half Marathon	Nouakchott, Mauritania	
Marathon	2:43:10	Majid Toure	13 April 2008	Rotterdam Marathon	Rotterdam, Netherlands	
110 m hurdles						
400 m hurdles						
3000 m steeplechase	9:07.18	Mohamed Beirouk	16 May 2015	Kampioenschap van Vlaanderen AC	Beveren, Belgium	
High jump	1.90 m	Nama Diarra	7 August 1969		Nouakchott, Mauritania	
Pole vault	3.15 m	Sidy Ould M'Barek	10 May 1968		Nouakchott, Mauritania	
Long jump	6.94 m	Daouda Bâ	1972		Nouakchott, Mauritania	
Triple jump	14.50 m	Sali Fall	7 August 1969		Nouakchott, Mauritania	
Shot put	14.20 m	Abdoulaye Diagana	2004		Nouakchott, Mauritania	
Discus throw	45.00 m	Samba Sy	10 July 1977		Nouakchott, Mauritania	
Hammer throw	32.79	Ibrahim Guaye	24 May 2015		Pontoise, France	
Javelin throw	49.52 m	Abdul Kader	31 October 1989		Kuwait City, Kuwait	
Decathlon						
Decathlon	100m / Long jump / Shot put / High jump / 400m / 110m H / Discus / Pole vault / Javelin / 1500m					
20 km walk (road)						
50 km walk (road)						
4 × 100 m relay	43.45	Mauritania	11 May 2001		Bakau, The Gambia	
4 × 400 m relay	3:20.42	Mauritania; Ould Mohamed Youba; Boubou Gandéga; Housseinou N'Dao; Mohamed Konaté	17 April 2004		Nouakchott, Mauritania	

=== Women ===
Event	Record	Athlete	Date	Meet	Place	Ref.
100 m	12.73	Badia Kamara	11 May 2012		Doha, Qatar	
100 m	11.87 (+0.5 m/s)	Fatou Dieng	21 July 2001	Jeux de la Francophonie	Ottawa, Canada	
200 m	28.78	Aminata Kamissoko	13 April 2003		Bakau, Gambia	
400 m	1:09.6 h	Khoury Keïta	8 May 2008		Nouakchott, Mauritania	
800 m	2:27.97	Aicha Fall	8 August 2012	Olympic Games	London, United Kingdom	
1500 m	5:32.0 h	Magatte Fall	May 2000		Nouakchott, Mauritania	
3000 m	12:50.89	Magatte Fall	25 May 2002		Bakau, The Gambia	
5000 m						
10,000 m						
Marathon						
100 m hurdles						
400 m hurdles						
3000 m steeplechase						
High jump	1.51 m	Badia Kamara	7 February 2012		Sharjah, United Arab Emirates	
Pole vault						
Long jump	5.05 m	Aminata Kamissoko	2004		Nouakchott, Mauritania	
Triple jump						
Shot put	15.83 m	Binta Diagana	11 July 2015	French Championships	Villeneuve d'Ascq, France	
Discus throw	42.30 m	Binta Diagana	1 December 2007		Nice, France	
Hammer throw	38.18 m	Binta Diagana	30 June 2010	Soiree NCAA	Nice, France	
Javelin throw	27.01 m	Binta Diagana	2 June 2010	Soiree NCAA/ASPTT	Nice, France	
Heptathlon						
Heptathlon	100m H / High jump / Shot put / 200m / Long jump / Javelin / 800m					
20 km walk (road)						
50 km walk (road)						
4 × 100 m relay	51.1 h	Mauritania	22 December 1995		Nouakchott, Mauritania	
4 × 400 m relay						

== Indoor ==
=== Men ===
Event	Record	Athlete	Date	Meet	Place	Ref.
60 m	6.92	Cheikh Diagana	11 February 2006		Poitiers, France	
200 m	23.02	Mandiaye Seck	19 January 2002		Orléans, France	
200 m	22.55	Ali Koïta (Note: dual citizenship unclear; French by World Athletics Athlete Profile)	25 February 2024	French U18 Championships	Nantes, France	
400 m	50.34	Mandiaye Seck	13 January 2002		Orléans, France	
800 m	1:58.71	Yeli Sagna Keita	17 January 2015		Sabadell, Spain	
1500 m	3:48.86 (Note: outdoor mark ratified as absolute record)	Mohamed Elbendir	4 February 2006		Zaragoza, Spain	
3000 m	8:08.67 (Note: outdoor mark ratified as absolute record)	Mohamed Elbendir	28 January 2006		Oviedo, Spain	
60 m hurdles						
High jump						
Pole vault						
Long jump						
Triple jump						
Shot put						
Heptathlon						
Heptathlon	60m / Long jump / Shot put / High jump / 60m H / Pole vault / 1000m					
5000 m walk						
4 × 400 m relay						

=== Women ===
Event	Record	Athlete	Date	Meet	Place	Ref.
60 m						
200 m						
400 m						
800 m	2:37.29	Kadijetou Ba	20 December 2008		Eaubonne, France	
1500 m	6:07.90	Kadijetou Ba	11 January 2009		Eaubonne, France	
3000 m						
60 m hurdles						
High jump	1.52 m (Note: outdoor mark ratified as absolute record)	Badia Kamara (Note: Badia Kamara became a Qatari citizen in 2013)	23 January 2012		Doha, Qatar	
Pole vault						
Long jump						
Triple jump						
Shot put	14.89 m	Binta Diagana	27 February 2010	French Championships	Paris, France	
Pentathlon						
Pentathlon	60m H / High jump / Shot put / Long jump / 800m					
3000 m walk						
4 × 400 m relay						
