= Jidou El Moctar =

Mauritanian runner

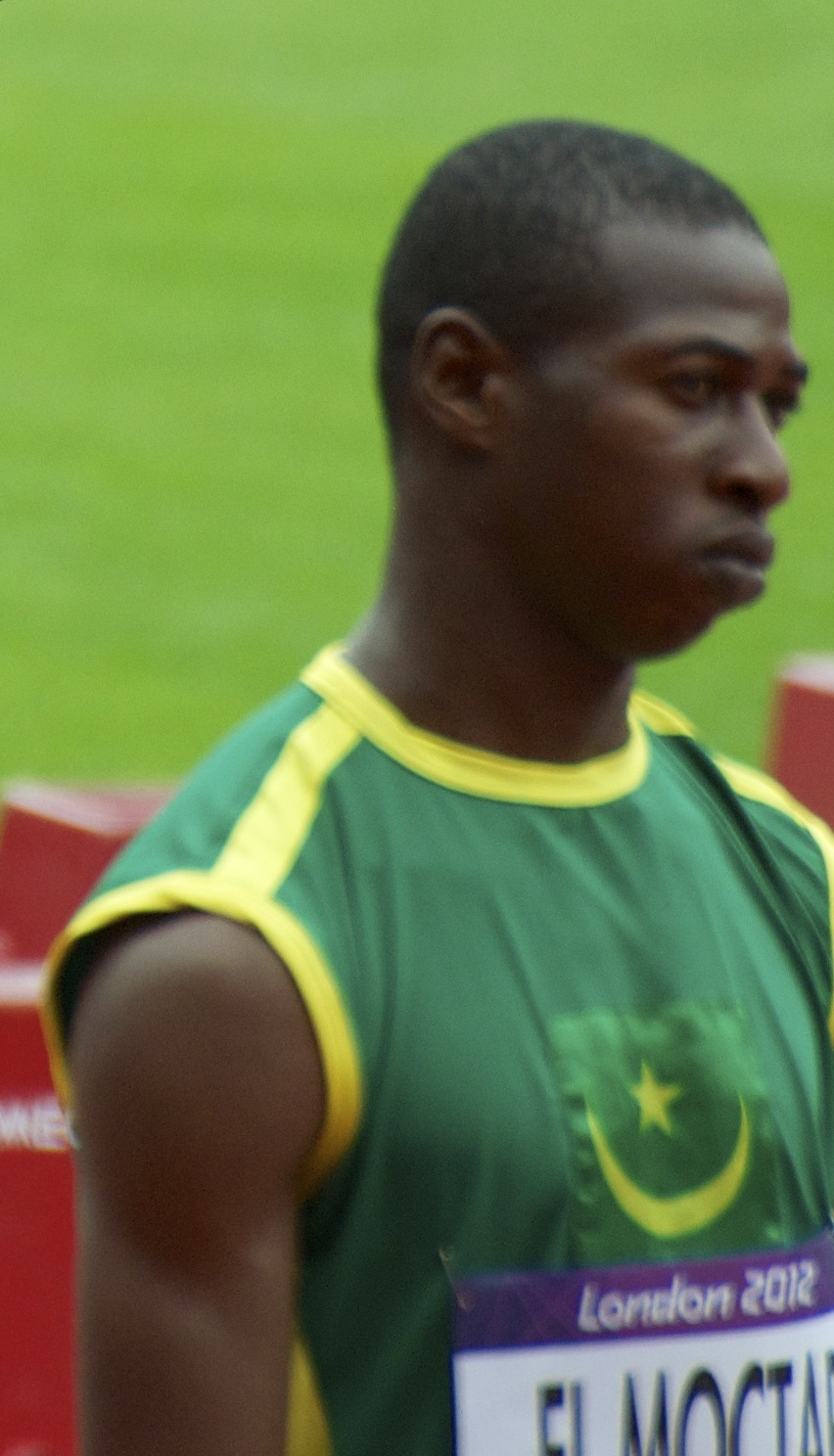
- Moctar at 2012 Olympics - Men's 100 metres

Personal information
- Born: 8 July 1985 (age 41)
- Height: 1.71 m (5 ft 7 1/2 in)
- Weight: 72 kg (159 lb)

Sport
- Country: Mauritania
- Sport: Athletics
- Event: 100 metres

Jidou Ould Khaye El Moctar (born 8 July 1985 in Nouakchott, Mauritania), also known as El Moctar Ould Jidou, is a Mauritanian runner who competed at the 2012 Summer Olympics in the 200 m event. He was the flagbearer of Mauritania at the opening ceremony. El Moctar was eliminated in the first round but finished with a personal best time of 22.94 seconds.

El Moctar set his 100 m personal best of 11.23 seconds at the 2015 African Games, finishing 9th in the first heat.

He competed in the 100 m event at the 2016 Summer Olympics in Rio de Janeiro. He finished 6th in his heat during the preliminary round and did not qualify for the first round of the finals. He was the flagbearer for Mauritania during the Parade of Nations.

Olympic Games
Preceded by Souleymane Ould Chebal	Flagbearer for Mauritania; 2012 London; 2016 Rio de Janeiro	Succeeded by Houlèye Ba Abidine Abidine
