= Camil Doua =

Mauritanian swimmer (born 2002)

Personal information
- Nationality: Mauritanian
- Born: Camil Ould Doua; 23 February 2002 (age 24) Bordeaux, France

Sport
- Sport: Swimming
- Strokes: Butterfly, backstroke, freestyle

Camil Ould Doua (Arabic: كامل ولد الدوه; born 23 February 2002) is a Mauritanian competitive swimmer. He qualified to represent Mauritania at the 2024 Summer Olympics.

== Biography ==
Camil was born on 23 February 2002 in Bordeaux, France; his father is from Mauritania and holds a position as an imam at a French mosque. The third of four children, he grew up in France and began swimming at age four or five. He attended high school at Lycée Vaclav Havel. He attempted to qualify for the 2020 Summer Olympics for his father's home country of Mauritania but was unable to, as the Mauritanian law at the time required him to give up his French citizenship.

In 2020, Camil's club, Cercle des Nageurs de Talence, closed, and he stopped swimming for a time due to the COVID-19 pandemic. He later took up swimming again and joined the club Creps. By 2023, the Mauritanian law had changed and he was able to obtain dual citizenship to represent the country in international competitions. He became a Mauritanian national champion and participated at the 2023 Arab Swimming Championships. Camil has set several national records, including in the 50-metre freestyle, 100-metre freestyle, 50-metre fly and 50-metre backstroke events.

In an interview with Sud Ouest, he described the state of swimming in Mauritania: "In Mauritania, there is only football. Swimming? There is no infrastructure, the only existing swimming pools are those in hotels." He said his goal is to "promote swimming in Mauritania as much as possible", and he partnered with the Mauritanian Swimming Federation on a project to build an Olympic-sized pool in the country. In 2024, he was the sole Mauritanian at the World Aquatics Championships, competing in the 50- and 100-metre freestyle events. He also competed at the 2024 African Games, where he placed fifth in the 100-metre freestyle.

Camil qualified for the 2024 Summer Olympics in the 100m freestyle event and was named Mauritania's flagbearer. In preparation for the Olympics, he was trained by French Olympic medalist Grégory Mallet, who had previously worked with Camil when he was a youth at Talence.

Olympic Games
Preceded by Abidine Abidine; Houlèye Ba	Flag bearer for Mauritania; Paris 2024 with Salam Bouha Ahamdy	Succeeded by Incumbent
