= Fatou Dieng (athlete) =

Mauritanian sprinter

Personal information
- Nationality: Mauritanian
- Born: 14 September 1983 (age 42)

Fatou Ndaga Dieng (born 14 September 1983) is a former Mauritanian sprint athlete, and is now a member of the Mauritania National Olympic and Sports Committee.

In 2000 Dieng became the first female to compete for her country at the Summer Olympics, when she went to the 2000 Summer Olympics held in Sydney. She entered the 100 metres and ran a time of 13.69 seconds; she finished 9th in her heat, Heat 7, which was run on 22 September 2000, so she didn't qualify for the next round. She set a Mauritanian national record for the 100m at 13.29 seconds which she ran at the Jeux de la Francophonie in Ottawa, Canada on 20 July 2001. She ran faster the next day, achieving a time of 11.87 seconds, which still stands as the Mauritanian national record. She was entered into the senior 100m women's sprint event at the 2011 All-Africa Games in Maputo, Mozambique but no result was recorded.
