= Mauritanian National Olympic and Sports Committee =

National Olympic Committee

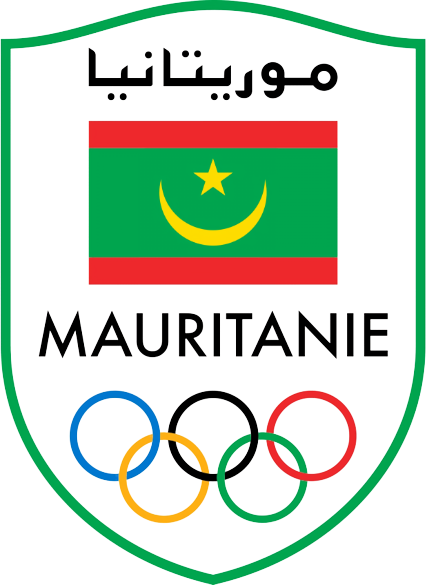
- Country: Mauritania
- Code: MTN
- Recognized: 1979
- Continental Association: ANOCA
- Headquarters: Nouakchott, Mauritania
- President: Abderrahmane Ethmane
- Secretary General: Salem Abeidna
- Website: www.cnosm.mr

The Mauritanian National Olympic and Sports Committee (French: Comité National Olympique et Sportif Mauritanien; Arabic: الوطنية الأولمبية والرياضية الموريتانية; IOC code: MTN) is the National Olympic Committee representing Mauritania.

== See also ==
- Mauritania at the Olympics
