= 2019 World Rowing Championships – Women's single sculls =

Women's single sculls at the 2019 World Rowing Championships
- Venue: Linz-Ottensheim
- Location: Ottensheim, Austria
- Dates: 25 August – 1 September
- Competitors: 37 from 37 nations
- Winning time: 7:17.14

Medalists
gold medal	Sanita Pušpure	Ireland
silver medal	Emma Twigg	New Zealand
bronze medal	Kara Kohler	United States

The women's single sculls competition at the 2019 World Rowing Championships took place at the Linz-Ottensheim regatta venue. A top-nine finish ensured qualification for the Tokyo Olympics.

== Schedule ==
The schedule was as follows:

Date	Time	Round
Sunday 25 August 2019	16:17	Heats
Monday 26 August 2019	15:12	Repechages
Wednesday 28 August 2019	12:53	Quarterfinals
Wednesday 28 August 2019	16:28	Semifinals E/F/G
Thursday 29 August 2019	16:20	Semifinals C/D
Thursday 29 August 2019	17:00	Final G
Thursday 29 August 2019	17:15	Final F
Thursday 29 August 2019	17:40	Final E
Friday 30 August 2019	12:40	Semifinals A/B
Sunday 1 September 2019	10:25	Final D
Sunday 1 September 2019	11:01	Final C
Sunday 1 September 2019	12:18	Final B
Sunday 1 September 2019	14:27	Final A

All times are Central European Summer Time (UTC+2)

== Results ==
=== Heats ===
The two fastest boats in each heat advanced directly to the quarterfinals. The remaining boats were sent to the repechages.

==== Heat 1 ====
Rank	Rower	Country	Time	Notes
1	Magdalena Lobnig	Austria	8:07.31	Q
2	Maike Diekmann	Namibia	8:11.86	Q
3	Marianne Madsen	Norway	8:16.05	R
4	Kenia Lechuga	Mexico	8:31.19	R
5	Viktorija Senkutė	Lithuania	8:39.66	R

==== Heat 2 ====
Rank	Rower	Country	Time	Notes
1	Kara Kohler	United States	8:03.13	Q
2	Diana Dymchenko	Ukraine	8:10.28	Q
3	Felice Chow	Trinidad and Tobago	8:18.54	R
4	Anna Markulinova	Slovakia	8:28.00	R
5	Joan Poh	Singapore	8:42.90	R

==== Heat 3 ====
Rank	Rower	Country	Time	Notes
1	Victoria Thornley	Great Britain	7:48.90	Q
2	Fie Udby Erichsen	Denmark	7:54.27	Q
3	Eeva Karppinen	Finland	8:11.80	R
4	Tala Abujbara	Qatar	8:13.81	R
5	Dareen Mahmoud Mohamed	Egypt	8:47.54	R

==== Heat 4 ====
Rank	Rower	Country	Time	Notes
1	Carling Zeeman	Canada	7:47.03	Q
2	Marie Jacquet	France	7:51.25	Q
3	Phạm Thị Huệ	Vietnam	8:10.18	R
4	Rojjana Raklao	Thailand	8:12.08	R
5	Akossiwa Ayivon	Togo	8:50.93	R

==== Heat 5 ====
Rank	Rower	Country	Time	Notes
1	Emma Twigg	New Zealand	7:43.81	Q
2	Lovisa Claesson	Sweden	7:53.01	Q
3	Verónica Toro Arana	Puerto Rico	8:00.55	R
4	Jelisaveta Simaceva	Latvia	8:10.51	R
5	Kim Ye-ji	South Korea	8:29.50	R

==== Heat 6 ====
Rank	Rower	Country	Time	Notes
1	Jeannine Gmelin	Switzerland	7:52.39	Q
2	Jiang Yan	China	7:56.97	Q
3	Svetlana Germanovich	Kazakhstan	8:15.61	R
4	Alejandra Alonso	Paraguay	8:35.71	R

==== Heat 7 ====
Rank	Rower	Country	Time	Notes
1	Miroslava Knapková	Czech Republic	7:55.39	Q
2	Annekatrin Thiele	Germany	8:03.47	Q
3	Huang Yi-ting	Chinese Taipei	8:19.61	R
4	Sarah Fraincart	Morocco	8:51.66	R

==== Heat 8 ====
Rank	Rower	Country	Time	Notes
1	Sanita Pušpure	Ireland	7:44.41	Q
2	Laila Youssifou	Netherlands	7:55.47	Q
3	Desislava Angelova	Bulgaria	8:22.18	R
4	Aikaterini Nikolaidou	Greece	8:28.66	R

=== Repechages ===
The two fastest boats in each repechage advanced to the quarterfinals. The remaining boats were sent to the E/F/G semifinals.

==== Repechage 1 ====
Rank	Rower	Country	Time	Notes
1	Aikaterini Nikolaidou	Greece	8:18.60	Q
2	Felice Chow	Trinidad and Tobago	8:18.89	Q
3	Eeva Karppinen	Finland	8:19.98	SE/F/G
4	Rojjana Raklao	Thailand	8:31.99	SE/F/G
5	Kim Ye-ji	South Korea	8:38.88	SE/F/G
6	Viktorija Senkutė	Lithuania	8:58.16	SE/F/G

==== Repechage 2 ====
Rank	Rower	Country	Time	Notes
1	Desislava Angelova	Bulgaria	8:15.56	Q
2	Huang Yi-ting	Chinese Taipei	8:18.50	Q
3	Kenia Lechuga	Mexico	8:21.31	SE/F/G
4	Jelisaveta Simaceva	Latvia	8:28.91	SE/F/G
5	Joan Poh	Singapore	8:52.63	SE/F/G

==== Repechage 3 ====
Rank	Rower	Country	Time	Notes
1	Phạm Thị Huệ	Vietnam	8:19.42	Q
2	Verónica Toro Arana	Puerto Rico	8:19.45	Q
3	Anna Markulinova	Slovakia	8:24.63	SE/F/G
4	Alejandra Alonso	Paraguay	8:44.98	SE/F/G
5	Dareen Mahmoud Mohamed	Egypt	9:02.11	SE/F/G

==== Repechage 4 ====
Rank	Rower	Country	Time	Notes
1	Svetlana Germanovich	Kazakhstan	8:11.05	Q
2	Marianne Madsen	Norway	8:15.81	Q
3	Tala Abujbara	Qatar	8:18.46	SE/F/G
4	Sarah Fraincart	Morocco	8:57.65	SE/F/G
5	Akossiwa Ayivon	Togo	9:06.14	SE/F/G

=== Quarterfinals ===
The three fastest boats in each quarter advanced to the A/B semifinals. The remaining boats were sent to the C/D semifinals.

==== Quarterfinal 1 ====
Rank	Rower	Country	Time	Notes
1	Kara Kohler	United States	7:29.00	SA/B
2	Magdalena Lobnig	Austria	7:34.57	SA/B
3	Fie Udby Erichsen	Denmark	7:35.61	SA/B
4	Marie Jacquet	France	7:45.55	SC/D
5	Marianne Madsen	Norway	7:48.13	SC/D
6	Desislava Angelova	Bulgaria	7:50.94	SC/D

==== Quarterfinal 2 ====
Rank	Rower	Country	Time	Notes
1	Victoria Thornley	Great Britain	7:30.69	SA/B
2	Carling Zeeman	Canada	7:33.84	SA/B
3	Jiang Yan	China	7:35.39	SA/B
4	Lovisa Claesson	Sweden	7:43.84	SC/D
5	Phạm Thị Huệ	Vietnam	7:53.19	SC/D
6	Huang Yi-ting	Chinese Taipei	8:00.15	SC/D

==== Quarterfinal 3 ====
Rank	Rower	Country	Time	Notes
1	Emma Twigg	New Zealand	7:28.20	SA/B
2	Jeannine Gmelin	Switzerland	7:32.19	SA/B
3	Laila Youssifou	Netherlands	7:33.90	SA/B
4	Annekatrin Thiele	Germany	7:46.80	SC/D
5	Aikaterini Nikolaidou	Greece	7:51.54	SC/D
6	Verónica Toro Arana	Puerto Rico	7:54.58	SC/D

==== Quarterfinal 4 ====
Rank	Rower	Country	Time	Notes
1	Sanita Pušpure	Ireland	7:21.03	SA/B
2	Miroslava Knapková	Czech Republic	7:36.19	SA/B
3	Diana Dymchenko	Ukraine	7:41.48	SA/B
4	Maike Diekmann	Namibia	7:43.80	SC/D
5	Felice Chow	Trinidad and Tobago	7:53.81	SC/D
6	Svetlana Germanovich	Kazakhstan	7:57.25	SC/D

=== Semifinals E/F/G ===
In each semi, the boats progressed as follows:

The two fastest were sent to the E final.
Any remaining (bar the slowest) were sent to the F final.
The slowest were sent to the G final.

==== Semifinal 1 ====
Rank	Rower	Country	Time	Notes
1	Eeva Karppinen	Finland	7:59.15	FE
2	Viktorija Senkutė	Lithuania	7:59.52	FE
3	Anna Markulinova	Slovakia	8:01.19	FF
4	Joan Poh	Singapore	8:25.73	FF
5	Akossiwa Ayivon	Togo	8:35.54	FG

==== Semifinal 2 ====
Rank	Rower	Country	Time	Notes
1	Tala Abujbara	Qatar	8:00.01	FE
2	Rojjana Raklao	Thailand	8:01.73	FE
3	Jelisaveta Simaceva	Latvia	8:04.36	FF
4	Dareen Mahmoud Mohamed	Egypt	8:33.78	FG

==== Semifinal 3 ====
Rank	Rower	Country	Time	Notes
1	Kenia Lechuga	Mexico	8:01.29	FE
2	Kim Ye-ji	South Korea	8:09.25	FE
3	Alejandra Alonso	Paraguay	8:22.86	FF
4	Sarah Fraincart	Morocco	8:30.87	FG

=== Semifinals C/D ===
The three fastest boats in each semi were sent to the C final. The remaining boats were sent to the D final.

==== Semifinal 1 ====
Rank	Rower	Country	Time	Notes
1	Marie Jacquet	France	7:29.36	FC
2	Lovisa Claesson	Sweden	7:33.21	FC
3	Aikaterini Nikolaidou	Greece	7:33.23	FC
4	Felice Chow	Trinidad and Tobago	7:37.13	FD
5	Desislava Angelova	Bulgaria	7:40.05	FD
6	Verónica Toro Arana	Puerto Rico	7:47.54	FD

==== Semifinal 2 ====
Rank	Rower	Country	Time	Notes
1	Annekatrin Thiele	Germany	7:32.09	FC
2	Maike Diekmann	Namibia	7:35.15	FC
3	Huang Yi-ting	Chinese Taipei	7:36.04	FC
4	Phạm Thị Huệ	Vietnam	7:40.11	FD
5	Marianne Madsen	Norway	7:41.52	FD
6	Svetlana Germanovich	Kazakhstan	7:42.43	FD

=== Semifinals A/B ===
The three fastest boats in each semi advanced to the A final. The remaining boats were sent to the B final.

==== Semifinal 1 ====
Rank	Rower	Country	Time	Notes
1	Kara Kohler	United States	7:33.60	FA
2	Victoria Thornley	Great Britain	7:35.49	FA
3	Jeannine Gmelin	Switzerland	7:36.78	FA
4	Fie Udby Erichsen	Denmark	7:40.22	FB
5	Laila Youssifou	Netherlands	7:44.22	FB
6	Miroslava Knapková	Czech Republic	7:45.92	FB

==== Semifinal 2 ====
Rank	Rower	Country	Time	Notes
1	Sanita Pušpure	Ireland	7:28.53	FA
2	Emma Twigg	New Zealand	7:32.70	FA
3	Carling Zeeman	Canada	7:34.25	FA
4	Jiang Yan	China	7:45.47	FB
5	Magdalena Lobnig	Austria	7:46.59	FB
6	Diana Dymchenko	Ukraine	7:51.47	FB

=== Finals ===
The A final determined the rankings for places 1 to 6. Additional rankings were determined in the other finals.

==== Final G ====
Rank	Rower	Country	Time
1	Sarah Fraincart	Morocco	8:13.38
2	Akossiwa Ayivon	Togo	8:20.67
3	Dareen Mahmoud Mohamed	Egypt	8:23.27

==== Final F ====
Rank	Rower	Country	Time
1	Anna Markulinova	Slovakia	7:55.00
2	Alejandra Alonso	Paraguay	7:58.21
3	Jelisaveta Simaceva	Latvia	7:59.28
4	Joan Poh	Singapore	8:14.51

==== Final E ====
Rank	Rower	Country	Time
1	Kenia Lechuga	Mexico	7:39.24
2	Tala Abujbara	Qatar	7:45.73
3	Eeva Karppinen	Finland	7:47.72
4	Kim Ye-ji	South Korea	7:54.31
5	Viktorija Senkutė	Lithuania	7:56.62
6	Rojjana Raklao	Thailand	7:59.78

==== Final D ====
Rank	Rower	Country	Time
1	Desislava Angelova	Bulgaria	7:46.93
2	Svetlana Germanovich	Kazakhstan	7:48.15
3	Marianne Madsen	Norway	7:48.25
4	Phạm Thị Huệ	Vietnam	7:53.06
5	Felice Chow	Trinidad and Tobago	7:54.01
6	Verónica Toro Arana	Puerto Rico	8:05.49

==== Final C ====
Rank	Rower	Country	Time
1	Annekatrin Thiele	Germany	7:44.54
2	Marie Jacquet	France	7:48.60
3	Lovisa Claesson	Sweden	7:50.03
4	Maike Diekmann	Namibia	7:52.44
5	Huang Yi-ting	Chinese Taipei	7:52.63
6	Aikaterini Nikolaidou	Greece	8:17.16

==== Final B ====
Rank	Rower	Country	Time
1	Jiang Yan	China	7:37.20
2	Laila Youssifou	Netherlands	7:37.37
3	Magdalena Lobnig	Austria	7:38.31
4	Fie Udby Erichsen	Denmark	7:39.17
5	Miroslava Knapková	Czech Republic	7:41.73
6	Diana Dymchenko	Ukraine	7:54.68

==== Final A ====
Rank	Rower	Country	Time
1st place, gold medalist(s)	Sanita Pušpure	Ireland	7:17.14
2nd place, silver medalist(s)	Emma Twigg	New Zealand	7:20.56
3rd place, bronze medalist(s)	Kara Kohler	United States	7:22.21
4	Victoria Thornley	Great Britain	7:25.48
5	Jeannine Gmelin	Switzerland	7:26.93
6	Carling Zeeman	Canada	7:29.70
