= 2018 World Rowing Championships – Women's single sculls =

Women's single sculls at the 2018 World Rowing Championships
- Venue: Plovdiv Regatta Venue
- Location: Plovdiv, Bulgaria
- Dates: 10–16 September
- Competitors: 22 from 22 nations
- Winning time: 7:20.12

Medalists
gold medal	Sanita Pušpure	Ireland
silver medal	Jeannine Gmelin	Switzerland
bronze medal	Magdalena Lobnig	Austria

The women's single sculls competition at the 2018 World Rowing Championships in Plovdiv took place at the Plovdiv Regatta Venue.

== Schedule ==
The schedule was as follows:

Date	Time	Round
Monday 10 September 2018	11:29	Heats
Wednesday 12 September 2018	12:29	Repechages
Thursday 13 September 2018	16:21	Semifinals C/D
Friday 14 September 2018	10:07	Semifinals A/B
Saturday 15 September 2018	16:29	Final D
Sunday 16 September 2018	09:46	Final C
Sunday 16 September 2018	10:46	Final B
Sunday 16 September 2018	12:19	Final A

All times are Eastern European Summer Time (UTC+3)

== Results ==
=== Heats ===
Heat winners advanced directly to the A/B semifinals. The remaining boats were sent to the repechages.

==== Heat 1 ====
Rank	Rower	Country	Time	Notes
1	Sanita Pušpure	Ireland	7:25.78	SA/B
2	Fie Udby Erichsen	Denmark	7:39.93	R
3	Lovisa Claesson	Sweden	7:46.13	R
4	Alice Baatz	Great Britain	7:52.25	R
5	Felice Chow	Trinidad and Tobago	7:57.90	R
6	Nurit Bezdesky	Israel	8:05.43	R

==== Heat 2 ====
Rank	Rower	Country	Time	Notes
1	Kara Kohler	United States	7:30.55	SA/B
2	Magdalena Lobnig	Austria	7:40.13	R
3	Diana Dymchenko	Ukraine	7:43.62	R
4	Ekaterina Kurochkina	Russia	7:46.42	R
5	Eleonora Trivella	Italy	7:56.02	R
6	Tala Abujbara	Qatar	8:07.91	R

==== Heat 3 ====
Rank	Rower	Country	Time	Notes
1	Carling Zeeman	Canada	7:35.40	SA/B
2	Annekatrin Thiele	Germany	7:39.91	R
3	Lina Šaltytė-Masilionė	Lithuania	7:41.74	R
4	Virginia Diaz	Spain	7:47.34	R
5	Milena Viana	Brazil	8:04.44	R

==== Heat 4 ====
Rank	Rower	Country	Time	Notes
1	Jeannine Gmelin	Switzerland	7:33.83	SA/B
2	Madeleine Edmunds	Australia	7:39.68	R
3	Hannah Osborne	New Zealand	7:54.43	R
4	Maike Diekmann	Namibia	7:56.47	R
5	Verónica Toro Arana	Puerto Rico	8:02.17	R

=== Repechages ===
The two fastest boats in each repechage advanced to the A/B semifinals. The remaining boats were sent to the C/D semifinals.

==== Repechage 1 ====
Rank	Rower	Country	Time	Notes
1	Madeleine Edmunds	Australia	7:34.21	SA/B
2	Lina Šaltytė-Masilionė	Lithuania	7:38.46	SA/B
3	Ekaterina Kurochkina	Russia	7:45.20	SC/D
4	Felice Chow	Trinidad and Tobago	7:49.38	SC/D

==== Repechage 2 ====
Rank	Rower	Country	Time	Notes
1	Annekatrin Thiele	Germany	7:39.86	SA/B
2	Diana Dymchenko	Ukraine	7:44.91	SA/B
3	Alice Baatz	Great Britain	7:54.48	SC/D
4	Verónica Toro Arana	Puerto Rico	7:57.97	SC/D

==== Repechage 3 ====
Rank	Rower	Country	Time	Notes
1	Magdalena Lobnig	Austria	7:36.07	SA/B
2	Lovisa Claesson	Sweden	7:39.86	SA/B
3	Maike Diekmann	Namibia	7:49.46	SC/D
4	Milena Viana	Brazil	7:53.85	SC/D
5	Tala Abujbara	Qatar	8:05.50	SC/D

==== Repechage 4 ====
Rank	Rower	Country	Time	Notes
1	Fie Udby Erichsen	Denmark	7:33.85	SA/B
2	Hannah Osborne	New Zealand	7:37.13	SA/B
3	Virginia Diaz	Spain	7:39.52	SC/D
4	Eleonora Trivella	Italy	7:56.69	SC/D
5	Nurit Bezdesky	Israel	8:10.35	SC/D

=== Semifinals C/D ===
The three fastest boats in each semi were sent to the C final. The remaining boats were sent to the D final.

==== Semifinal 1 ====
Rank	Rower	Country	Time	Notes
1	Ekaterina Kurochkina	Russia	7:59.97	FC
2	Maike Diekmann	Namibia	8:04.23	FC
3	Verónica Toro Arana	Puerto Rico	8:10.03	FC
4	Eleonora Trivella	Italy	8:17.97	FD
5	Tala Abujbara	Qatar	8:23.51	FD

==== Semifinal 2 ====
Rank	Rower	Country	Time	Notes
1	Virginia Diaz	Spain	8:00.48	FC
2	Felice Chow	Trinidad and Tobago	8:03.31	FC
3	Alice Baatz	Great Britain	8:03.45	FC
4	Milena Viana	Brazil	8:12.60	FD
5	Nurit Bezdesky	Israel	8:18.38	FD

=== Semifinals A/B ===
The three fastest boats in each semi advanced to the A final. The remaining boats were sent to the B final.

==== Semifinal 1 ====
Rank	Rower	Country	Time	Notes
1	Sanita Pušpure	Ireland	7:23.01	FA
2	Fie Udby Erichsen	Denmark	7:30.73	FA
3	Annekatrin Thiele	Germany	7:32.74	FA
4	Lovisa Claesson	Sweden	7:39.09	FB
5	Carling Zeeman	Canada	7:48.75	FB
6	Lina Šaltytė-Masilionė	Lithuania	7:51.59	FB

==== Semifinal 2 ====
Rank	Rower	Country	Time	Notes
1	Jeannine Gmelin	Switzerland	7:23.93	FA
2	Kara Kohler	United States	7:25.47	FA
3	Magdalena Lobnig	Austria	7:26.73	FA
4	Madeleine Edmunds	Australia	7:26.84	FB
5	Hannah Osborne	New Zealand	7:37.30	FB
6	Diana Dymchenko	Ukraine	7:46.50	FB

=== Finals ===
The A final determined the rankings for places 1 to 6. Additional rankings were determined in the other finals.

==== Final D ====
Rank	Rower	Country	Time
1	Milena Viana	Brazil	7:50.51
2	Eleonora Trivella	Italy	7:55.56
3	Tala Abujbara	Qatar	8:02.64
4	Nurit Bezdesky	Israel	DNS

==== Final C ====
Rank	Rower	Country	Time
1	Ekaterina Kurochkina	Russia	7:34.45
2	Virginia Diaz	Spain	7:39.10
3	Alice Baatz	Great Britain	7:47.45
4	Maike Diekmann	Namibia	7:48.65
5	Felice Chow	Trinidad and Tobago	7:50.37
6	Verónica Toro Arana	Puerto Rico	8:01.50

==== Final B ====
Rank	Rower	Country	Time
1	Madeleine Edmunds	Australia	7:26.85
2	Hannah Osborne	New Zealand	7:31.28
3	Carling Zeeman	Canada	7:33.84
4	Lina Šaltytė-Masilionė	Lithuania	7:37.54
5	Diana Dymchenko	Ukraine	7:42.91
6	Lovisa Claesson	Sweden	7:42.98

==== Final A ====
Rank	Rower	Country	Time
1st place, gold medalist(s)	Sanita Pušpure	Ireland	7:20.12
2nd place, silver medalist(s)	Jeannine Gmelin	Switzerland	7:25.93
3rd place, bronze medalist(s)	Magdalena Lobnig	Austria	7:29.51
4	Kara Kohler	United States	7:30.41
5	Fie Udby Erichsen	Denmark	7:33.15
6	Annekatrin Thiele	Germany	7:41.68
