= Rowing at the 2020 Summer Olympics – Women's single sculls =

Olympic rowing event

Women's single sculls at the Games of the XXXII Olympiad
- Olympic rowing
- Venue: Sea Forest Waterway
- Dates: 23–30 July 2021
- Competitors: 32 from 32 nations
- Winning time: 7:13.97

Medalists
1st place, gold medalist(s)		Emma Twigg	New Zealand
2nd place, silver medalist(s)		Hanna Prakatsen	ROC
3rd place, bronze medalist(s)		Magdalena Lobnig	Austria

The women's single sculls event at the 2020 Summer Olympics took place from 23 to 30 July 2021 at the Sea Forest Waterway. 32 rowers from 32 nations competed.

== Background ==
This was the 12th appearance of the event, which has been held every year since women's rowing was introduced in 1976.

The World Champions since the 2016 Games are Jeannine Gmelin of Switzerland, (2017) and Sanita Pušpure, (2018 and 2019) of Ireland. Both rowers qualified for the 2020 regatta.

== Qualification ==
Each National Olympic Committee (NOC) is limited to a single boat (one rower) in the event. There are 32 qualifying places in the women's single sculls:

- 9 from the 2019 World Championship
- 5 from the Asia & Oceania qualification regatta
- 5 from the Africa qualification regatta
- 5 from the Americas qualification regatta
- 3 from the Europe qualification regatta
- 2 from the final qualification regatta
- 1 host nation place
- 2 invitational places

The COVID-19 pandemic delayed many of the events for qualifying for rowing.

== Competition format ==
This rowing event is a single scull event, meaning that each boat is propelled by a single rower. The "scull" portion means that the rower uses two oars, one on each side of the boat; this contrasts with sweep rowing in which each rower has one oar and rows on only one side (not feasible for singles events). The competition consists of multiple rounds. The competition continues to use the five-round format introduced in 2012. Finals are held to determine the placing of each boat; these finals are given letters with those nearer to the beginning of the alphabet meaning a better ranking. Semifinals are named based on which finals they feed, with each semifinal having two possible finals. The course uses the 2000 metres distance that became the Olympic standard in 1912.

During the first round six heats are held. The first three boats in each heat advance to the quarterfinals, while all others are relegated to the repechages.

The repechage is a round which offers rowers a second chance to qualify for the quarterfinals. Placing in the repechage heats determines which quarterfinal the boat would race in. The top two boats in each repechage heat move on to the quarterfinals, with the remaining boats going to the E/F semifinals.

The four quarterfinals are the second round for rowers still competing for medals. Placing in the quarterfinal heats determines which semifinal the boat would race in. The top three boats in each quarterfinal move on to the A/B semifinals, with the bottom three boats going to the C/D semifinals.

Six semifinals are held, two each of A/B semifinals, C/D semifinals, and E/F semifinals. For each semifinal race, the top three boats move on to the better of the two finals, while the bottom three boats go to the lesser of the two finals possible. For example, a second-place finish in an A/B semifinal would result in advancement to the A final.

The fifth and final round is the finals. Each final determines a set of rankings. The A final determines the medals, along with the rest of the places through 6th. The B final gives rankings from 7th to 12th, the C from 13th to 18th, and so on. Thus, to win a medal rowers have to finish in the top three of their heat (or top two of their repechage heat), top three of their quarterfinal, and top three of their A/B semifinal to reach the A final.

== Schedule ==
The competition is held over eight days. Times given are session start times; multiple rowing events might have races during a session.

All times are Japan Standard Time (UTC+9)

Date	Time	Round
Friday, 23 July 2021	9:30	Heats
Saturday, 24 July 2021	8:00	Repechage
Sunday, 25 July 2021	9:20	Semifinals E/F
Sunday, 25 July 2021	11:00	Quarterfinals
Thursday, 29 July 2021	10:30	Semifinals A/B
Thursday, 29 July 2021	12:00	Semifinals C/D
Friday, 30 July 2021	7:55	Final F
Friday, 30 July 2021	8:15	Final E
Friday, 30 July 2021	8:25	Final D
Friday, 30 July 2021	8:45	Final C
Friday, 30 July 2021	9:05	Final B
Friday, 30 July 2021	9:33	Final A

== Results ==
=== Heats ===
The first three of each heat qualify for the quarterfinals, while the remainder go to the repechage.

==== Heat 1 ====
Rank	Lane	Rower	Nation	Time	Notes
1	2	Kara Kohler	United States	7:49.71	Q
2	1	Tatsiana Klimovich	Belarus	7:51.86	Q
3	6	Nazanin Malaei	Iran	7:59.01	Q
4	4	Alejandra Alonso	Paraguay	8:11.88	R
5	5	Esther Toko	Nigeria	8:58.49	R
6	3	Esraa Khogali	Sudan	10:18.27	R

==== Heat 2 ====
Rank	Lane	Rower	Nation	Time	Notes
1	5	Sanita Pušpure	Ireland	7:46.08	Q
2	6	Kenia Lechuga	Mexico	7:54.21	Q
3	2	Anneta Kyridou	Greece	7:54.28	Q
4	3	Felice Aisha Chow	Trinidad and Tobago	8:02.02	R
5	1	Kathleen Grace Noble	Uganda	8:21.85	R
6	4	Joan Poh	Singapore	8:31.12	R

==== Heat 3 ====
Rank	Lane	Rower	Nation	Time	Notes
1	3	Hanna Prakatsen	ROC	7:48.74	Q
2	5	Jiang Yan	China	7:53.14	Q
3	1	Veronica Toro Arana	Puerto Rico	8:11.57	Q
4	4	Winne Hung	Hong Kong	8:17.79	R
5	2	Sarah Fraincart	Morocco	8:32.78	R

==== Heat 4 ====
Rank	Lane	Rower	Nation	Time	Notes
1	3	Victoria Thornley	Great Britain	7:44.30	Q
2	5	Jeannine Gmelin	Switzerland	7:47.20	Q
3	1	Lovisa Claesson	Sweden	7:58.41	Q
4	2	Evidelia González	Nicaragua	8:25.18	R
5	4	Claire Ayivon	Togo	8:48.07	R

==== Heat 5 ====
Rank	Lane	Rower	Nation	Time	Notes
1	2	Magdalena Lobnig	Austria	7:37.91	Q
2	4	Carling Zeeman	Canada	7:40.72	Q
3	5	Maike Diekmann	Namibia	7:56.37	Q
4	1	Milena Venega	Cuba	8:03.00	R
5	3	Tala Abujbara	Qatar	8:06.29	R

==== Heat 6 ====
Rank	Lane	Rower	Nation	Time	Notes
1	5	Emma Twigg	New Zealand	7:35.22	Q
2	1	Sophie Souwer	Netherlands	7:39.96	Q
3	3	Jovana Arsić	Serbia	7:46.74	Q
4	4	Huang Yi-ting	Chinese Taipei	8:04.59	R
5	2	Jeong Hye-jeong	South Korea	8:12.15	R

=== Repechage ===
The first two in each heat qualify for the quarterfinals; the rest go to Semifinals E/F (out of medal contention).

==== Repechage heat 1 ====
Rank	Lane	Rower	Nation	Time	Notes
1	4	Alejandra Alonso	Paraguay	8:08.91	Q
2	3	Huang Yi-ting	Chinese Taipei	8:11.56	Q
3	2	Tala Abujbara	Qatar	8:16.88	QEF
4	1	Joan Poh	Singapore	8:40.06	QEF
5	5	Sarah Fraincart	Morocco	8:42.78	QEF

==== Repechage heat 2 ====
Rank	Lane	Rower	Nation	Time	Notes
1	2	Felice Chow	Trinidad and Tobago	8:15.94	Q
2	1	Jeong Hye-jeong	South Korea	8:26.73	Q
3	3	Evidelia González	Nicaragua	8:37.55	QEF
4	4	Esther Toko	Nigeria	9:07.54	QEF

==== Repechage heat 3 ====
Rank	Lane	Rower	Nation	Time	Notes
1	3	Milena Venega	Cuba	8:17.30	Q
2	2	Winne Hung	Hong Kong	8:23.58	Q
3	4	Kathleen Grace Noble	Uganda	8:36.01	QEF
4	1	Claire Ayivon	Togo	9:04.23	QEF
5	5	Esraa Khogali	Sudan	10:25.94	QEF

=== Quarterfinals ===
The first three of each heat qualify to Semifinal A/B, while the remainder go to Semifinal C/D (out of medal contention).

==== Quarterfinal 1 ====
Rank	Lane	Rower	Nation	Time	Notes
1	4	Sanita Pušpure	Ireland	7:58.30	SF A/B
2	3	Kara Kohler	United States	7:59.39	SF A/B
3	5	Jiang Yan	China	8:00.01	SF A/B
4	2	Jovana Arsić	Serbia	8:09.37	SF C/D
5	6	Alejandra Alonso	Paraguay	8:29.80	SF C/D
6	1	Winne Hung	Hong Kong	8:36.37	SF C/D

==== Quarterfinal 2 ====
Rank	Lane	Rower	Nation	Time	Notes
1	3	Hanna Prakatsen	ROC	7:49.64	SF A/B
2	5	Carling Zeeman	Canada	7:57.58	SF A/B
3	4	Victoria Thornley	Great Britain	7:59.93	SF A/B
4	2	Lovisa Claesson	Sweden	8:16.99	SF C/D
5	6	Milena Venega	Cuba	8:25.26	SF C/D
6	1	Jeong Hye-jeong	South Korea	8:38.70	SF C/D

==== Quarterfinal 3 ====
Rank	Lane	Rower	Nation	Time	Notes
1	4	Magdalena Lobnig	Austria	7:58.20	SF A/B
2	3	Sophie Souwer	Netherlands	7:59.92	SF A/B
3	2	Anneta Kyridou	Greece	8:02.19	SF A/B
4	5	Tatsiana Klimovich	Belarus	8:09.04	SF C/D
5	1	Felice Chow	Trinidad and Tobago	8:21.23	SF C/D
6	6	Veronica Toro Arana	Puerto Rico	8:35.32	SF C/D

==== Quarterfinal 4 ====
Rank	Lane	Rower	Nation	Time	Notes
1	3	Emma Twigg	New Zealand	7:54.96	SF A/B
2	4	Jeannine Gmelin	Switzerland	8:02.10	SF A/B
3	1	Nazanin Malaei	Iran	8:07.32	SF A/B
4	2	Kenia Lechuga	Mexico	8:09.29	SF C/D
5	5	Maike Diekmann	Namibia	8:21.69	SF C/D
6	6	Huang Yi-ting	Chinese Taipei	8:34.51	SF C/D

=== Semifinals ===
The first three of each heat qualify to the better final (E, C, A) while the remainder go to the lower final (F, D, B).

==== Semifinal A/B 1 ====
Rank	Lane	Rower	Nation	Time	Notes
1	4	Hanna Prakatsen	ROC	7:23.61	FA
2	5	Jeannine Gmelin	Switzerland	7:25.80	FA
3	1	Jiang Yan	China	7:27.30	FA
4	2	Sophie Souwer	Netherlands	7:29.66	FB
5	3	Sanita Pušpure	Ireland	7:34.40	FB
6	6	Anneta Kyridou	Greece	7:40.81	FB

==== Semifinal A/B 2 ====
Rank	Lane	Rower	Nation	Time	Notes
1	4	Emma Twigg	New Zealand	7:20.70	FA
2	6	Victoria Thornley	Great Britain	7:25.12	FA
3	3	Magdalena Lobnig	Austria	7:25.59	FA
4	2	Kara Kohler	United States	7:26.10	FB
5	5	Carling Zeeman	Canada	7:38.28	FB
6	1	Nazanin Malaei	Iran	7:45.52	FB

==== Semifinal C/D 1 ====
Rank	Lane	Rower	Nation	Time	Notes
1	4	Lovisa Claesson	Sweden	7:35.91	FC
2	3	Jovana Arsić	Serbia	7:39.26	FC
3	5	Maike Diekmann	Namibia	7:40.77	FC
4	2	Felice Chow	Trinidad and Tobago	7:45.14	FD
5	1	Veronica Toro Arana	Puerto Rico	7:53.36	FD
6	6	Winne Hung	Hong Kong	7:56.30	FD

==== Semifinal C/D 2 ====
Rank	Lane	Rower	Nation	Time	Notes
1	4	Kenia Lechuga	Mexico	7:33.72	FC
2	3	Tatsiana Klimovich	Belarus	7:33.78	FC
3	5	Milena Venega	Cuba	7:41.18	FC
4	2	Alejandra Alonso	Paraguay	7:43.33	FD
5	6	Huang Yi-ting	Chinese Taipei	7:56.00	FD
6	1	Jeong Hye-jeong	South Korea	8:06.32	FD

==== Semifinal E/F 1 ====
Rank	Lane	Rower	Nation	Time	Notes
1	3	Tala Abujbara	Qatar	8:24.24	FE
2	2	Kathleen Grace Noble	Uganda	8:31.67	FE
3	1	Esther Toko	Nigeria	9:07.70	FE
4	4	Esraa Khogali	Sudan	10:23.52	FF

==== Semifinal E/F 2 ====
Rank	Lane	Rower	Nation	Time	Notes
1	2	Evidelia González	Nicaragua	8:36.99	FE
2	4	Sarah Fraincart	Morocco	8:43.90	FE
3	3	Joan Poh	Singapore	8:47.77	FE
4	1	Claire Ayivon	Togo	9:15.29	FF

=== Finals ===
==== Final F ====
Rank	Lane	Rower	Nation	Time	Notes
31	2	Claire Ayivon	Togo	8:44.42	
32	1	Esraa Khogali	Sudan	10:05.32	

==== Final E ====
Rank	Lane	Rower	Nation	Time	Notes
25	4	Tala Abujbara	Qatar	8:00.22	
26	5	Kathleen Grace Noble	Uganda	8:07.00	
27	3	Evidelia González	Nicaragua	8:10.87	
28	6	Joan Poh	Singapore	8:21.23	
29	2	Sarah Fraincart	Morocco	8:25.38	
30	1	Esther Toko	Nigeria	8:42.78	

==== Final D ====
Rank	Lane	Rower	Nation	Time	Notes
19	3	Felice Chow	Trinidad and Tobago	7:48.06	
20	5	Huang Yi-ting	Chinese Taipei	7:52.18	
21	4	Alejandra Alonso	Paraguay	7:55.63	
22	2	Veronica Toro Arana	Puerto Rico	7:57.22	
23	1	Winne Hung	Hong Kong	8:02.79	
24	6	Jeong Hye-jeong	South Korea	8:06.13	

==== Final C ====
Rank	Lane	Rower	Nation	Time	Notes
13	5	Tatsiana Klimovich	Belarus	7:39.53	
14	4	Lovisa Claesson	Sweden	7:41.07	
15	2	Jovana Arsić	Serbia	7:43.30	
16	3	Kenia Lechuga	Mexico	7:43.55	
17	1	Milena Venega	Cuba	7:47.40	
18	6	Maike Diekmann	Namibia	7:52.17	

==== Final B ====
Rank	Lane	Rower	Nation	Time	Notes
7	3	Sophie Souwer	Netherlands	7:25.96	
8	2	Carling Zeeman	Canada	7:29.59	
9	4	Kara Kohler	United States	7:29.72	
10	6	Anneta Kyridou	Greece	7:36.79	
11	1	Nazanin Malaei	Iran	7:42.57	
12	5	Sanita Pušpure	Ireland	DNS	

==== Final A ====
Rank	Lane	Rower	Nation	Time	Notes
1st place, gold medalist(s)	4	Emma Twigg	New Zealand	7:13.97	OB
2nd place, silver medalist(s)	3	Hanna Prakatsen	ROC	7:17.39	
3rd place, bronze medalist(s)	6	Magdalena Lobnig	Austria	7:19.72	
4	5	Victoria Thornley	Great Britain	7:20.39	
5	2	Jeannine Gmelin	Switzerland	7:20.91	
6	1	Jiang Yan	China	7:21.33	
