= Rowing at the 2022 Asian Games – Women's double sculls =

Women's double sculls at the 2022 Asian Games
- Venue: Fuyang Water Sports Centre
- Date: 20–24 September 2023
- Competitors: 20 from 10 nations

Medalists
gold medal	Lu Shiyu; Shen Shuangmei	China
silver medal	Mahsa Javer; Zeinab Norouzi	Iran
bronze medal	Nuntida Krajangjam; Parisa Chaempudsa	Thailand

The women's double sculls competition at the 2022 Asian Games in Hangzhou, China was held on 20, 21 & 24 September 2023 at the Fuyang Water Sports Centre.

== Schedule ==
All times are China Standard Time (UTC+08:00)

Date	Time	Event
Wednesday, 20 September 2023	09:40	Heats
Thursday, 21 September 2023	09:40	Repechage
Sunday, 24 September 2023	09:50	Finals

== Results ==
=== Heats ===
- Qualification: 1–2 → Final A (FA), 3–5 → Repechage (R)

==== Heat 1 ====
Rank	Team	Time	Notes
1	Iran (IRI); Mahsa Javer; Zeinab Norouzi	7:09.29	FA
2	Vietnam (VIE); Nguyễn Thị Giang; Phạm Thị Thảo	7:12.57	FA
3	South Korea (KOR); Park Ji-youn; Jeong Hye-jeong	7:13.82	R
4	Kazakhstan (KAZ); Svetlana Germanovich; Mariya Chernets	7:18.36	R
5	Sri Lanka (SRI); Maheshi Liyanage; Jayani Hirunika	7:50.29	R

==== Heat 2 ====
Rank	Team	Time	Notes
1	China (CHN); Lu Shiyu; Shen Shuangmei	6:51.31	FA
2	Thailand (THA); Nuntida Krajangjam; Parisa Chaempudsa	7:10.95	FA
3	Indonesia (INA); Julianti; Nurtang	7:25.32	R
4	Hong Kong (HKG); Ko Cho Kiu; Lee Hoi Kiu	7:32.91	R
5	Singapore (SGP); Teo Zhi Xuan; Joan Poh	7:34.47	R

=== Repechage ===
- Qualification: 1–2 → Final A (FA), 3–6 → Final B (FB)

Rank	Team	Time	Notes
1	South Korea (KOR); Park Ji-youn; Jeong Hye-jeong	7:36.62	FA
2	Kazakhstan (KAZ); Svetlana Germanovich; Mariya Chernets	7:38.77	FA
3	Indonesia (INA); Julianti; Nurtang	7:47.27	FB
4	Hong Kong (HKG); Ko Cho Kiu; Lee Hoi Kiu	7:55.20	FB
5	Singapore (SGP); Teo Zhi Xuan; Joan Poh	8:01.01	FB
6	Sri Lanka (SRI); Maheshi Liyanage; Jayani Hirunika	8:20.63	FB

=== Finals ===
==== Final B ====
Rank	Team	Time
1	Indonesia (INA); Julianti; Nurtang	7:34.49
2	Hong Kong (HKG); Ko Cho Kiu; Lee Hoi Kiu	7:42.09
3	Singapore (SGP); Teo Zhi Xuan; Joan Poh	7:46.15
4	Sri Lanka (SRI); Maheshi Liyanage; Jayani Hirunika	8:03.66

==== Final A ====
Rank	Team	Time
1st place, gold medalist(s)	China (CHN); Lu Shiyu; Shen Shuangmei	7:03.41
2nd place, silver medalist(s)	Iran (IRI); Mahsa Javer; Zeinab Norouzi	7:17.08
3rd place, bronze medalist(s)	Thailand (THA); Nuntida Krajangjam; Parisa Chaempudsa	7:21.70
4	Kazakhstan (KAZ); Svetlana Germanovich; Mariya Chernets	7:25.36
5	South Korea (KOR); Park Ji-youn; Jeong Hye-jeong	7:28.41
6	Vietnam (VIE); Nguyễn Thị Giang; Phạm Thị Thảo	7:33.33
