= Rowing at the 2018 Asian Games – Women's single sculls =

Women's single sculls at the 2018 Asian Games
- Venue: Jakabaring Lake
- Date: 19–23 August 2018
- Competitors: 11 from 11 nations

Medalists
gold medal	Chen Yunxia	China
silver medal	Huang Yi-ting	Chinese Taipei
bronze medal	Alexandra Opachanova	Kazakhstan

The women's single sculls competition at the 2018 Asian Games was held on 19–23 August at the JSC Lake.

== Schedule ==
All times are Western Indonesia Time (UTC+07:00)

Date	Time	Event
Sunday, 19 August 2018	09:30	Heats
Tuesday, 21 August 2018	09:20	Repechages
Thursday, 23 August 2018	09:10	Finals

== Results ==
=== Heats ===
- Qualification: 1 → Final A (FA), 2–6 → Repechages (R)

==== Heat 1 ====
Rank	Athlete	Time	Notes
1	Huang Yi-ting (TPE)	8:56.66	FA
2	Alexandra Opachanova (KAZ)	9:08.34	R
3	Tala Abujbara (QAT)	9:28.28	R
4	Winne Hung (HKG)	9:35.94	R
5	Joan Poh (SGP)	9:48.40	R
6	Rabia Rafique (PAK)	12:16.54	R

==== Heat 2 ====
Rank	Athlete	Time	Notes
1	Chen Yunxia (CHN)	8:40.66	FA
2	Haruna Sakakibara (JPN)	8:50.25	R
3	Mahsa Javer (IRI)	9:18.21	R
4	Nguyễn Thị Hải (VIE)	9:43.90	R
5	Dewi Yuliawati (INA)	10:26.20	R

=== Repechages ===
- Qualification: 1–2 → Final A (FA), 3–5 → Final B (FB)

==== Repechage 1 ====
Rank	Athlete	Time	Notes
1	Alexandra Opachanova (KAZ)	8:31.87	FA
2	Mahsa Javer (IRI)	8:40.63	FA
3	Winne Hung (HKG)	8:49.77	FB
4	Dewi Yuliawati (INA)	9:41.15	FB
5	Rabia Rafique (PAK)	11:15.15	FB

==== Repechage 2 ====
Rank	Athlete	Time	Notes
1	Haruna Sakakibara (JPN)	8:40.21	FA
2	Nguyễn Thị Hải (VIE)	8:43.95	FA
3	Tala Abujbara (QAT)	8:54.31	FB
4	Joan Poh (SGP)	9:09.85	FB

=== Finals ===
==== Final B ====
Rank	Athlete	Time
1	Tala Abujbara (QAT)	8:36.79
2	Winne Hung (HKG)	8:41.50
3	Joan Poh (SGP)	9:00.45
4	Dewi Yuliawati (INA)	9:18.55
5	Rabia Rafique (PAK)	10:37.87

==== Final A ====
Rank	Athlete	Time
1st place, gold medalist(s)	Chen Yunxia (CHN)	8:08.21
2nd place, silver medalist(s)	Huang Yi-ting (TPE)	8:16.14
3rd place, bronze medalist(s)	Alexandra Opachanova (KAZ)	8:19.32
4	Haruna Sakakibara (JPN)	8:25.74
5	Nguyễn Thị Hải (VIE)	8:28.84
6	Mahsa Javer (IRI)	8:52.69
