= List of Sudanese records in athletics =

The following are the national records in athletics in Sudan maintained by Sudan Athletic Association (SAA).

== Outdoor ==
Key to tables: Awaiting ratification Record not kept by SAA Not ratified or later rescinded by SAA

=== Men ===
Event	Record	Athlete	Date	Meet	Place	Ref.
100 m	10.27 (+1.2 m/s)	Ahmed Ali	9 April 2016	LSU Battle on the Bayou	Baton Rouge, United States	
100 m	10.1 h	Nagmeldin Ali Abubakr	4 May 2005		Addis Ababa, Ethiopia	
100 m	10.1 h	A. K. Mark	23 June 2010		Dar es Salaam, Tanzania	
200 m	20.16 (+2.0 m/s)	Ahmed Ali	2 April 2016	Florida Relays	Gainesville, United States	
300 m	32.49 A	Ali Babiker Nagmeldin	23 July 2005		Sestriere, Italy	
400 m	44.76	Hassan El Kashief	3 June 1982		Provo, United States	
600 m	1:18.59	Musa Sulimann	18 May 2023	Nationales Auffahrts-Meeting	Langenthal, Switzerland	
800 m	1:42.23	Abubaker Kaki Khamis	4 June 2010	Bislett Games	Oslo, Norway	
1000 m	2:13.62	Abubaker Kaki Khamis	3 July 2010	Prefontaine Classic	Eugene, United States	
1500 m	3:31.76	Abubaker Kaki Khamis	22 July 2011	Herculis	Fontvieille, Monaco	
3000 m	7:48.03	Omer Khalifa	11 July 1987		Formia, Italy	
5000 m	13:27.09 (Note: Outdoor best; indoor mark ratified as absolute record.)	Mohamed Yagoub	23 June 2001		Solihull, United Kingdom	
10,000 m	28:20.26	Ahmed Musa Jouda	3 August 1984	Olympic Games	Los Angeles, United States	
10 km (road)	27:58+	Yaseen Abdalla	25 October 2026	Valencia Half Marathon	Valencia, Spain	
15 km (road)	42:01+	Yaseen Abdalla	25 October 2026	Valencia Half Marathon	Valencia, Spain	
20 km (road)	56:08+	Yaseen Abdalla	25 October 2026	Valencia Half Marathon	Valencia, Spain	
Half marathon	59:12	Yaseen Abdalla	25 October 2026	Valencia Half Marathon	Valencia, Spain	
Marathon	2:11:41	Yaseen Abdalla	10 August 2024	Olympic Games	Paris, France	
110 m hurdles	13.45 (+2.0 m/s)	Todd Matthews-Jouda	7 October 2004	Pan Arab Games	Algiers, Algeria	
400 m hurdles	49.82	Mohamed Adam Shoaib	4 July 2017		Castellón, Spain	
3000 m steeplechase	8:31.20	Abdalla Targan	1 June 2016	Meeting National 2	Montbéliard, France	
High jump	2.28 m	Mohamed Younis Idris	27 May 2015	Atletissima	Namur, Belgium	
Pole vault	4.02 m	Barnaba Mariam	5 November 1964		Khartoum, Sudan	
Long jump	7.61 m (+1.3 m/s)	Rabah Yousif	5 May 2007		London, United Kingdom	
Triple jump	15.56 m	Khaled Ahmed Moussa	15 March 1996		Khartoum, Sudan	
Shot put	14.89 m	Ahmed Duraid	28 May 1988		Freiburg, West Germany	
Discus throw	48.06 m	Ahmed Duraid	14 August 1988		Dortmund, West Germany	
Hammer throw						
Javelin throw	61.82 m	Garang Malong	2 July 1988		Nairobi, Kenya	
Decathlon						
Decathlon	100m (wind) / Long jump (wind) / Shot put / High jump / 400m / 110m H (wind) / Discus / Pole vault / Javelin / 1500m					
20 km walk (road)						
50 km walk (road)						
4 × 100 m relay	41.27	Sudan	26 July 1978	All-Africa Games	Algiers, Algeria	
4 × 400 m relay	3:04.00	Sudan; Rabah Yousif; Ali Babiker Nagmeldin; Ahmad Ismail; Abubaker Kaki Khamis	4 May 2008	African Championships	Addis Ababa, Ethiopia	

=== Women ===
Event	Record	Athlete	Date	Meet	Place	Ref.
100 m	11.75 (+1.2 m/s)	Hiba Mahgoub	22 June 2025	Newham & Essex Beagles "Stratford Speed GP2" Track Open	London, United Kingdom	
200 m	23.75	Nawal El Jack	21 May 2009		Khartoum, Sudan	
200 m	23.62 (+1.1 m/s)	Hiba Saeed	11 August 2022	Islamic Solidarity Games	Konya, Turkey	
200 m	23.46 (+0.9 m/s)	Hiba Saeed	19 April 2024	John McDonnell Invitational	Fayetteville, United States	
200 m	23.25 (+1.2 m/s)	Hiba Mahgoub	29 May 2021	NCAA Division II Championships	Allendale, United States	
400 m	51.19	Nawal El Jack	15 July 2005	World Youth Championships	Marrakesh, Morocco	
800 m	2:02.42	Muna Jabir Adam	23 May 2009		Rabat, Morocco	
1500 m	4:12.01	Ehsan Gibril	3/4 June 2011		Dar Es Salaam, Tanzania	
1500 m	4:08.49 (Note: 2 years ineligibility (29 May 2009 until 28 May 2011) and disqualification of all results from 8 May 2009)	Ehssan Arbab	8 May 2009	Qatar Athletic Super Grand Prix	Doha, Qatar	
3000 m	9:13.77	Durka Mana	1 September 2009		Rovereto, Italy	
5000 m	16:01.25	Hind Roko Musa	24 June 2004		Algiers, Algeria	
10,000 m	33:20.09	Amina Bakhit	23 April 2016	President’s Cup	Dubai, United Arab Emirates	
10 km (road)	40:39+	Shamha Ahmed	17 September 2022	Oslo Half Marathon	Oslo, Norway	
15 km (road)	1:01:18+	Shamha Ahmed	17 September 2022	Oslo Half Marathon	Oslo, Norway	
20 km (road)	1:22:40+	Shamha Ahmed	17 September 2022	Oslo Half Marathon	Oslo, Norway	
Half marathon	1:14:10	Sali Niguse	28 November 2016		Trabzon, Turkey	
Marathon	2:49:52	Chaltu Niguese Shiferaw	22 January 2016	Dubai Marathon	Dubai, United Arab Emirates	
100 m hurdles	14.31	Muna Jabir Adam	31 May 2007		Kampala, Uganda	
400 m hurdles	54.93	Muna Jabir Adam	22 July 2007	All-Africa Games	Algiers, Algeria	
3000 m steeplechase	9:47.41	Muna Durka	19 July 2008		Barcelona, Spain	
High jump	1.85 m	Yamilé Aldama	18 July 2004		London, United Kingdom	
Pole vault						
Long jump	6.34 m (−1.9 m/s)	Yamilé Aldama	18 May 2007		Amman, Jordan	
Triple jump	15.28 m (+0.3 m/s)	Yamilé Aldama	2 August 2004		Linz, Austria	
Shot put	10.60 m	Kassima Ismail	9/10 October 2004		Khartoum, Sudan	
Discus throw	26.60 m	Munika Kosia	9/10 October 2004		Khartoum, Sudan	
Hammer throw						
Javelin throw	39.02 m	Munika Kosia	10 October 2004		Khartoum, Sudan	
Heptathlon	4977 pts	Muna Jabir Adam	15-16 September 2005		Radès, Tunisia	
Heptathlon	100m H (wind) / High jump / Shot put / 200m (wind) / Long jump (wind) / Javelin / 800m; 15.26 / 1.54 m / 9.49 m / 25.06w / 5.23 m / 32.63 m / 2:09.22					
20 km walk (road)						
50 km walk (road)						
4 × 100 m relay	47.43	Sudan; Amina Bakhit; Gubara Asmal; Nawal El Jack; Muna Jabir Adam	23 November 2007	Pan Arab Games	Cairo, Egypt	
4 × 400 m relay	3:34.84	Sudan; Nawal El Jack; Faiza Omar; Hind Musa; Muna Jabir Adam	22 July 2007	All-Africa Games	Algiers, Algeria	

== Indoor ==
=== Men ===
Event	Record	Athlete	Date	Meet	Place	Ref.
60 m	6.82	Ahmed Ali	26 January 2018	Bob Pollock Invitational	Clemson, United States	
60 m	6.79 A	Ahmed Ali	31 January 2015	New Mexico Team Invitational	Albuquerque, United States	
60 m	6.79	Ahmed Ali	6 February 2015	Frank Sevigne Husker Invitational	Lincoln, United States	
200 m	21.24	Ahmed Ali	27 January 2018	Bob Pollock Invitational	Clemson, United States	
300 m	33.19	Rabah Yousif	10 February 2013	Indoor Flanders Meeting	Ghent, Belgium	
400 m	46.24	Rabah Yousif	20 February 2010	Aviva Indoor Grand Prix	Birmingham, United Kingdom	
400 m	46.24	Rabah Yousif	19 February 2011	Aviva Indoor Grand Prix	Birmingham, United Kingdom	
600 m	1:16.12	Ismail Ahmed Ismail	7 February 2010	Russian Winter Meeting	Moscow, Russia	
800 m	1:44.75	Ismail Ahmed Ismail	26 February 2009	Prague Indoor Meeting	Prague, Czech Republic	
1000 m	2:15.77	Abubaker Kaki Khamis	21 February 2008	GE Galan	Stockholm, Sweden	
1500 m	3:42.21	Osman Yahya	7 February 2009		Stuttgart, Germany	
1500 m	3:39.40 X	Osman Yahya	15 February 2009	BW-Bank Meeting	Karlsruhe, Germany	
Mile	3:57.53	Yaseen Abdalla	12 February 2022	David Hemery Valentine Invitational	Boston, United States	
3000 m	7:34.17	Yaseen Abdalla	7 December 2024	Sharon Colyear-Danville Season Opener	Boston, United States	
5000 m	13:09.99	Yaseen Abdalla	14 February 2025	BU David Hemery Valentine Invitational	Boston, United States	
60 m hurdles	7.97	Todd Matthews Jouda	28 February 2004		Clemson, United States	
High jump	2.28 m (Note: outdoor mark ratified as absolute record)	Mohamed Younis Idris	23 February 2014	French Championships	Bordeaux, France	
Pole vault						
Long jump						
Triple jump						
Shot put						
Heptathlon						
Heptathlon	60m / Long jump / Shot put / High jump / 60m H / Pole vault / 1000m					
5000 m walk						
4 × 400 m relay						

=== Women ===
Event	Record	Athlete	Date	Meet	Place	Ref.
60 m						
200 m	23.82	Hiba Mahgoub	13 February 2021	Ichabod Invite	Topeka, United States	
400 m	54.27	Hiba Mahgoub	16 February 2024	Arkansas Qualifier	Fayetteville, United States	
800 m	2:14.28	Muna Jabir Adam	7 February 2004		Sheffield, United Kingdom	
1500 m	4:28.3 h	Hind Musa	15 February 2004		Belfast, United Kingdom	
3000 m	9:35.29	Hind Musa	15 February 2004		Belfast, United Kingdom	
60 m hurdles						
High jump						
Pole vault						
Long jump	6.17 m	Yamilé Aldama	11 February 2006	Reunión Internacional de Atletismo	Valencia, Spain	
Triple jump	14.90 m	Yamilé Aldama	6 March 2004	World Championships	Budapest, Hungary	
Shot put						
Pentathlon						
Pentathlon	60m H / High jump / Shot put / Long jump / 800m					
3000 m walk						
4 × 400 m relay	3:49.56	Sudan	27 September 2005	Women's Islamic Games	Tehran, Iran	
