= Boston University Track and Tennis Center =

Sports venue in Boston Massachusetts

- Location in the United States Location in Massachusetts
- Address: 100 Ashford Street
- Location: Boston Massachusetts, 02215; U.S.
- Coordinates: 42.3546°N 71.1236°W
- Owner: Boston University
- Operator: Boston University
- Capacity: 4,800

Construction
- Opened: 2002
- Renovated: 2023

Tenants
- Boston University Terriers track & field Boston University Terriers tennis

The Boston University Track and Tennis Center is an athletic facility of Boston University that houses a banked, 6-lane, 200-meter indoor track.

== History ==
The Track and Tennis Center (TTC) was constructed in 2002 to house an indoor track and tennis courts. The first track meet at the TTC occurred on December 6, 2002. The first tennis match followed two months later on February 9, 2003. The TTC replaced the Commonwealth Armory, which served as home to the Boston University indoor track team from 1979 through 2002.

== Track ==
The track is known in the running community as one of the fastest indoor tracks in the world due to its banked turns, wooden supports, and general atmosphere. In February 2023, 52 men broke the four-minute mile barrier in the same day at the facility, setting the record for the most sub-4 minute miles at a single meet. On January 28, 2013, Olympic medalist Galen Rupp ran a facility record of 3.50.92 in the mile. On February 9, 2018, Edward Cheserek improved that to 3:49.44, the #2 mark in history at the time. On March 3, 2019, Yomif Kejelcha of Ethiopia improved that to a new world indoor record of 3:47.01. Also during that same race, American Johnny Gregorek Jr. ran a 3:49.98, becoming the second American to break 3:50 in the mile, also marking the first time indoors that two people ran under 3:50 in the same race.

== Records set on the BU indoor track ==
All times from World Athletics profiles. This is an incomplete list.

Date	Athlete / team	Event	Record	Time
February 13, 2009	Mary Teresa Cullen (Republic of Ireland)	3000 m	Irish record	8:43.74
February 11, 2011	Megan Wright (Canada)	5000 m	Canadian record	15:25.15
January 16, 2014	Galen Rupp (United States)	5000 m	Area record	13:01.26
January 16, 2014	Cam Levins (Canada)	5000 m	Canadian record	13:19.16
January 16, 2014	Mary Cain (United States)	1000 m	American junior record	2:39.25
January 24, 2014	Galen Rupp (United States)	2 mile	Area record	8:07.41
January 24, 2014	Mary Cain (United States)	Mile	American U20 record	4:24.11
January 25, 2014	Donald Sanford (Israel)	500 m	Israeli record	1:00.86
February 8, 2014	Donald Sanford (Israel)	400 m	Israeli record	46.46
March 2, 2014	David Torrence (United States)	1000 m	Area record	2:16.76
March 2, 2014	Nathan Brannen (Canada)	1000 m	Canadian record	2:16.87
December 6, 2014	Gemma Acheampong (Ghana)	300 m	Ghanaian record	39.50
December 6, 2014	Sarah Disanza (United States)	5000 m	American U20 record	15:20.57
February 12, 2016	Shanie Landen (Israel)	500 m	Israeli record	1:13.61
January 19, 2017	Gemma Acheampong (Ghana)	300 m	Ghanaian record	39.01
February 26, 2017	Mo Ahmed (Canada)	5000 m	Canadian record	13:04.60
February 26, 2017	Kemoy Campbell (Jamaica)	5000 m	Jamaican record	13:14.45
February 26, 2017	Sampson Laari (Ghana)	Mile	Ghanaian record	3:58.75
January 26, 2018	Natalija Piliušina (Lithuania)	Mile	Lithuanian record	4:32.67
February 9, 2018	Edward Cheserek (Kenya)	Mile	Kenyan record	3:49.44
February 25, 2018	Mobolade Ajomale (Canada)	200 m	NCAA DII record	20.67
February 25, 2018	Agnes Abu (Ghana)	800 m	Ghanaian record	2:02.30
February 25, 2018	Josh Hoey (United States)	800 m	American high school record	1:47.67
February 25, 2018	Sampson Laari (Ghana)	Mile	Ghanaian record	3:58.65
February 25, 2018	Hoka NJNYTC (Joe McAsey (United States) , Kyle Merber (United States) , Chris Giesting (United States) , Jesse Garn (United States) )	4x800 m relay	World record	7:11.30
December 1, 2018	Jessica Pascoe (Australia)	5000 m	Australian record	15:34.76
February 8, 2019	Hygua Endo (Japan)	5000 m	Japanese record	13:27.81
February 8, 2019	Jenna Westaway (Canada)	1000 m	Canadian record	2:37.04
February 8, 2019	Riko Matsuzaki (Japan)	3000 m	Japanese record	9:00.86
February 24, 2019	Jenna Westaway (Canada)	800 m	Canadian record	1:59.87
March 3, 2019	Yomif Kejelcha (Ethiopia)	Mile	World record	3:47.01
March 3, 2019	John Gregorek Jr. (United States)	Mile	Area record	3:49.98
December 7, 2019	Carmela Cardama (Spain)	5000 m	Spanish record	15:25.41
December 7, 2019	Joshua Desouza (Canada)	5000 m	Canadian U20 record	14:09.03
January 24, 2020	Matt Baxter (New Zealand)	5000 m	New Zealand record	13:27.61
January 24, 2020	Laura Galván (Mexico)	Mile	Mexican record	4:31.89
February 1, 2020	Dom Scott (South Africa)	5000 m	South African record	15:20.84
February 1, 2020	Nicole Hutchinson (Canada)	5000 m	Canadian record	15:25.11
February 14, 2020	Eglė Morenaitė (Lithuania)	3000 m	Lithuanian record	9:12.58
February 15, 2020	Fernando Daniel Martínez (Mexico)	3000 m	Mexican record	7:44.31
February 27, 2020	Karissa Schweizer (United States)	3000 m	American record	8:25.70
February 27, 2020	Konstanze Klosterhalfen (Germany)	5000 m	German record	14:30.79
February 27, 2020	Heidi See (Australia)	5000 m	Australian record	15:25.59
February 27, 2020	Eglė Morenaitė (Lithuania)	5000 m	Lithuanian record	16:12.11
February 27, 2020	Joshua Thompson (United States)	1500 m	Area record	3:34.77
February 28, 2020	Matthew Hughes (Canada)	5000 m	Canadian record	13:13.38
February 28, 2020	Justyn Knight (Canada)	1500 m	Canadian record	3:36.13
February 28, 2020	Melany Smart (Australia)	3000 m	Australian U20 record	9:08.57
December 4, 2021	Olli Hoare (Australia)	5000 m	Area record	13:09.96
December 4, 2021	George Beamish (New Zealand)	5000 m	New Zealand record	13:12.53
December 4, 2021	George Kusche (South Africa)	5000 m	South African record	13:28.95
December 4, 2021	Nico Young (United States)	5000 m	American U20 record	13:22.59
December 4, 2021	Katelyn Tuohy (United States)	3000 m	American U20 record	8:54.18
January 28, 2022	Mikuni Yada (Japan)	3000 m	Japanese record	9:06.63
February 11, 2022	Gabriela DeBues-Stafford (Canada)	5000 m	Area record	14:31.38
February 11, 2022	Elise Cranny (United States)	5000 m	American record	14:33.17
February 11, 2022	Roisin Willis (United States)	800 m	American high school record	2:00.06
February 11, 2022	Alma Delia Cortes (Mexico)	Mile	Mexican record	4:27.09
February 11, 2022	Hanna Hermansson (Sweden)	Mile	Swedish Record	4:29.81
February 11, 2022	Berenice Cleyet-Merle (France)	Mile	French record / NCAA DII record	4:31.99
February 11, 2022	Chloe Thomas (Canada)	Mile	Canadian U20 record	4:40.74
February 12, 2022	Grant Fisher (United States)	5000 m	Area record	12:53.73
February 12, 2022	Mo Ahmed (Canada)	5000 m	Canadian record	12:56.87
February 12, 2022	Marc Scott (United Kingdom)	5000 m	Area record	12:57.08
February 12, 2022	Adriaan Wildschutt (South Africa)	5000 m	South African record	13:09.30
February 12, 2022	Jonas Raess (Switzerland)	5000 m	Swiss record	13:07.95
February 12, 2022	Alfredo Santana (Puerto Rico)	5000 m	Puerto Rican record	13:53.80
February 12, 2022	Yared Nuguse (United States)	3000 m	Collegiate record	7:38.13
February 27, 2022	Josh Kerr (United Kingdom)	Mile	British record	3:48.87
February 27, 2022	Cameron Proceviat (Canada)	Mile	Canadian record	3:52.54
February 27, 2022	Mikuni Yada (Japan)	5000 m	Japanese record	15:23.87
February 27, 2022	Christian Noble (United States)	Mile	NCAA DII record	3:56.10
February 27, 2022	Christian Noble (United States)	3000 m	NCAA DII record	7:50.98
December 3, 2022	Amos Bartelsmeyer (Germany)	5000 m	German record	13:17.71
December 3, 2022	Brian Fay (Republic of Ireland)	5000 m	Irish record	13:16.77
December 3, 2022	Zofia Dudek (Poland)	5000 m	Polish record	15:40.41
December 3, 2022	Hilda Chebet (Kenya)	5000 m	Kenyan U20 record	15:17.97
December 3, 2022	Parker Wolfe (United States)	5000 m	American U20 record	13:19.73
January 27, 2023	Yared Nuguse (United States)	3000 m	Area record	7:28.24
January 27, 2023	Sam Atkin (United Kingdom)	3000 m	British record	7:31.97
January 27, 2023	Drew Bosley (United States)	3000 m	Collegiate record	7:36.42
January 27, 2023	Yaseen Abdalla (Sudan)	3000 m	Sudanese record	7:42.23
January 27, 2023	Woody Kincaid (United States)	5000 m	Area record	12:51.61
January 27, 2023	Mike Foppen (Netherlands)	5000 m	Dutch record	13:11.60
January 27, 2023	Sam Parsons (Germany)	5000 m	German record	13:12.78
January 28, 2023	Lucia Stafford (Canada)	1000 m	Area record	2:33.75
February 3, 2023	University of Washington (Sophie O’Sullivan (Republic of Ireland) , Marlena Preigh (United States) , Carley Thomas (Australia) , Anna Gibson (United States) )	DMR	Collegiate record	10:46.62
February 4, 2023	Kazuto Iizawa (Japan)	Mile	Japanese record	3:56.01
February 4, 2023	Alondra Negron (Puerto Rico)	5000 m	Puerto Rican record	16:06.51
February 4, 2023	Carolina Lozano (Argentina)	5000 m	Argentinan record	16:14.03
February 10, 2023	Nozomi Tanaka (Japan)	3000 m	Japanese record	8:45.64
February 10, 2023	Alondra Negron (Puerto Rico)	Mile	Puerto Rican record	4:38.44
February 10, 2023	Brianna Robles (United States)	Mile	NCAA DII record	15:47.88
February 11, 2023	Amos Bartelsmeyer (Germany)	Mile	German record	3:50.45
February 11, 2023	Robin Hendrix (Belgium)	5000 m	Belgian record	13:17.65
February 26, 2023	Rob Napolitano (Puerto Rico)	Mile	Puerto Rican record	3:54.29
December 2, 2023	Kieran Lumb (Canada)	3000 m	Canadian Record	7:38.39
December 2, 2023	Brian Musau (Kenya)	3000 m	World Youth best	7:38.04
December 2, 2023	Parker Valby (United States)	5000 m	Collegiate Record	14:56.11
December 2, 2023	Fiona Smith (United States)	5000 m	NCAA DIII record	15:50.48
December 2, 2023	Graham Blanks (United States)	5000 m	Collegiate Record	13:03.78
December 2, 2023	Habtom Samuel (Eritrea)	5000 m	Eritrean record	13:14.86
December 2, 2023	Joseph O’Brien (United Kingdom)	5000 m	British U20 record	13:51.24
December 2, 2023	Ky Robinson (Australia)	5000 m	Australian record	13:06.42
December 2, 2023	Romain Legendre (France)	5000 m	NCAA DII record	13:24.09
January 26, 2024	George Beamish (New Zealand)	5000 m	New Zealand record	13:04.33
January 26, 2024	Nico Young (United States)	5000 m	Collegiate record	12:57.14
January 26, 2024	Adriaan Wildschutt (South Africa)	5000 m	South African record	12:56.76
January 26, 2024	John Haymans (Belgium)	5000 m	Belgian record	13:03.46
January 26, 2024	Mike Foppen (Netherlands)	5000 m	Dutch record	13:08.60
January 26, 2024	Keita Satoh (Japan)	5000 m	Japanese record	13:09.45
January 26, 2024	Andrew Coscoran (Republic of Ireland)	5000 m	Irish record	13:12.56
January 26, 2024	Noah Baltus (Netherlands)	Mile	Dutch record	3:54.81
January 27, 2024	Senayet Getachew (Ethiopia)	5000 m	World U20 record	14:42.94
January 27, 2024	Marta Garica Alons (Spain)	5000 m	Spanish record	14:46.37
February 3, 2024	Charles Grethen (Luxembourg)	Mile	Luxembourgish record	3:52.67
February 3, 2024	Thomas Vanoppen (Belgium)	Mile	Belgian record	3:53.98
February 3, 2024	Noah Baltus (Netherlands)	Mile	Dutch record	3:54.28
February 9, 2024	Gracie Hyde (United States)	3000 m	NCAA DII record	8:58.33
February 10, 2024	Thomas Vanoppen (Belgium)	Mile	Belgian record	3:52.66
February 10, 2024	Rob Napolitano (Puerto Rico)	Mile	Puerto Rican record	3:54.12
February 10, 2024	Ryoma Aoki (Japan)	Mile	Japanese record	3:54.84
February 10, 2024	Parvej Khan (India)	Mile	Indian record	3:56.64
February 10, 2024	Jack Anstey (Australia)	1000 m	Australian record	2:16.95
February 16, 2024	Parvej Khan (India)	Mile	Indian record	3:55.41
February 16, 2024	University of Washington (Chloe Foerster (United States) , Anna Terrell (United States) , Marlena Preigh (United States) , Carley Thomas (Australia) )	DMR	Collegiate record	10:43.39
December 7, 2024	Ethan Strand (United States)	3000 m	Collegiate record	7:30.15
December 7, 2024	Doris Lemngole (Kenya)	5000 m	Collegiate record	14:52.57
December 7, 2024	Amy Bunnage (Australia)	5000 m	Australian record	15:00.75
December 7, 2024	Yaseen Abdalla (Sudan)	3000 m	Sudanese record	7:34.17
December 7, 2024	Adva Cohen (Israel)	5000 m	Israeli record	15:23.93
February 1, 2025	Ethan Strand (United States)	Mile	Collegiate record	3:48.32
February 1, 2025	Robert Farken (Germany)	Mile	German record	3:49.45
February 1, 2025	Jimmy Gressier (France)	5000 m	French record	13:00.54
February 1, 2025	Romain Legendre (France)	5000 m	NCAA DII record	13:02.08
February 1, 2025	Habtom Samuel (Eritrea)	5000 m	Eritrean record	13:04.92
February 1, 2025	Eduardo Herrera (Mexico)	5000 m	Mexican record	13:06.36
February 14, 2025	Romain Legendre (France)	3000 m	NCAA DII record	7:36.28
February 14, 2025	Gulveer Singh (India)	3000 m	Indian record	7:38.26
February 14, 2025	Grant Fisher (United States)	5000 m	World record	12:44.09
February 14, 2025	Yaseen Abdalla (Sudan)	5000 m	Sudanese record	13:09.99
February 14, 2025	Valentin Soca (Uruguay)	5000 m	Uruguayan record	13:14.09
February 15, 2025	Gabija Galvydyte (Lithuania)	Mile	Lithuanian record	4:22.76
February 15, 2025	Silan Ayyildiz (Turkey)	Mile	Collegiate record Turkish record	4:23.46
February 15, 2025	Lorena Rangel Batres (Mexico)	Mile	Mexican record	4:26.56
February 15, 2025	Nozomi Tanaka (Japan)	5000 m	Japanese record	14:51.26
February 21, 2025	Kieran Lumb (Canada)	Mile	Canadian record	3:52.39
February 21, 2025	Amina Maatoug (Netherlands)	Mile	Dutch record	4:26.39
February 21, 2025	Owen Powell (United States)	Mile	American high school record	3:56.66
February 21, 2025	Jack Rayner (Australia)	5000 m	Australian record	12:59.43
February 21, 2025	Gulveer Singh (India)	5000 m	Indian record	12:59.77
February 21, 2025	Narve Gilje Nordås (Norway)	5000 m	Norwegian record	13:04.85
February 21, 2025	Mohamed Abdilaahi (Germany)	5000 m	German record	13:06.38
March 2, 2025	Sintayehu Vissa (Italy)	Mile	Italian record	4:21.51
March 2, 2025	Maia Ramsden (New Zealand)	Mile	New Zealand record	4:21.56
March 2, 2025	Adva Cohen (Israel)	Mile	Israeli record	4:31.10
March 2, 2025	Adva Cohen (Israel)	1500 m	Israeli record	4:12.44+
March 2, 2025	Valentin Soca (Uruguay)	3000 m	Uruguayan record	7:34.10
March 2, 2025	Adriaan Wildschutt (South Africa)	5000 m	South African record	12:55.02
December 6, 2025	Jane Hedengren (United States)	5000 m	NCAA record USA U20 Record	14:44.79
December 6, 2025	Adisu Guadia (Israel)	5000 m	Israeli record	13:29.58
December 6, 2025	Josh Hoey (United States)	600 m	World record	1:12.84
December 6, 2025	Jaouad Khchina (Morocco)	3000 m	Moroccan U20 Record	7:51.76
January 31, 2025	Hazem Miawad (Egypt)	800 m	Egyptian Record	1:46.62
January 31, 2025	Sam Ruthe (New Zealand)	Mile	New Zealand record World U18 Record	3:48.88
January 31, 2025	Peter Sisk (Belgium)	Mile	Belgian record	3:50.31
January 31, 2025	Foster Malleck (Canada)	Mile	Canadian record	3:51.39
February 13, 2026	Matan Ivri (Israel)	3000 m	Israeli record	7:43.88
February 13, 2026	Riley Chamberlain (United States)	Mile	NCAA record	4:20.61
February 13, 2026	Wilma Neilsen (Sweden)	Mile	Swedish Record	4:21.04
