= Sarah Fraincart =

Moroccan rower and politician

Personal information
- Citizenship: France; Morocco
- Born: 6 July 1999 (age 26) Troyes, France
- Height: 168 cm (5 ft 6 in)
- Weight: 68 kg (150 lb)

Sport
- Country: Morocco
- Sport: Rowing
- Event: Single sculls
- Club: Toulouse

Achievements and titles
- Olympic finals: 2020
- World finals: 2017, 2019
- Regional finals: 2019
Medal record
Representing Morocco
African Games
Bronze medal – third place	2019 Rabat	500 metres single sculls

Sarah Juliette Saidi Fraincart (born 6 July 1999) is a French-Moroccan rower and politician. In rowing, she came third in the 500 metres single sculls event at the 2019 African Games and competed in the single sculls event at the 2020 Summer Olympics. She was a candidate for France's National Assembly in the 2022 legislative elections, but was not elected.

== Personal life ==
Fraincart is a dual French-Moroccan citizen. Fraincart was born in Troyes, France. Her mother is Moroccan and her father French. She studied when she was a teenager in collège Pithou, Troyes in a musical section Classe à horaires aménagés en musique, danse, théâtre ou arts plastiques.

== Rowing career ==
Fraincart started rowing in Troyes, at the Société Nautique Troyenne. In 2017, she chose to represent Morocco after her times were not good enough to qualify for the French team for the 2020 Summer Olympics. In 2018, she started training in Toulouse, France.

Fraincart competed in the single sculls event at the 2017 World Rowing Championships. In the same year, she came second in her event at the Arab Rowing Championship. In 2019, she won an event at the Nouvelle-Aquitaine and Occitanie regional rowing championships. At the 2019 African Games, Fraincart came third in the 500 metres single sculls event. She also competed in the single sculls event at the 2019 World Rowing Championships.

In May 2019, Fraincart was awarded an International Olympic Committee Olympic Solidarity scholarship to assist with her attempts to qualify for the 2020 Summer Olympics. In October 2019, Fraincart qualified for the single sculls event at the Games, after finishing fourth at the African qualification tournament. The qualification standard had been to finish in the top five out of the 15 competitors at the event. At the Games, Fraincart finished last in her heat, and repechage race. She finished second in her E semi-final, and fifth in her E final. She was 29th overall, and the third best African finisher in the event, behind Maike Diekmann and Kathleen Noble.

== Political career ==
On 12 May 2022, the Nouvelle Union Populaire écologique et sociale named Fraincart as its candidate in Aube's 2nd constituency for the 2022 legislative election. She is a member of the La France Insoumise party and a supporter of the left-wing political leader Jean-Luc Mélenchon. Fraincart got 6,165 votes, the third highest in the constituency, and was not elected.
