= Hannah Osborne (disambiguation) =

Hannah Osborne is a New Zealand rower.

Hannah Osborne may also refer to:

- Hannah Osborne (Hollyoaks), fictional character in Hollyoaks
- Hannah Osborne (The Handmaid's Tale), fictional character in The Handmaid's Tale
