= Nawel Chiali =

Algerian rower (born 1991)

Personal information
- Born: 28 June 1991 (age 35)

Sport
- Country: Algeria
Medal record
African Games
Gold medal – first place	2019 Rabat	Single Sculls 500m
Gold medal – first place	2019 Rabat	Single Sculls 1000m

Nawel Chiali (born 28 June 1991) is an Algerian rower.

She competed in the 2018 World Rowing Championships held in Plovdiv, Bulgaria.

She competed in rowing at the 2019 African Games held in Rabat, Morocco. She won the gold medal in the women's single sculls 500 metres event. She also won the gold medal in the women's single sculls 1000 metres event.
