= Esraa Khogali =

Sudanese rower

Personal information
- Full name: Esraa Mohamed Ahmed Mohamed Khogali
- Nationality: Sudan
- Born: 26 April 1992 (age 33)

Sport
- Sport: Rowing

Esraa Mohamed Ahmed Mohamed Khogali (Arabic: اسراء محمد احمد محمد خوجلي; born 26 April 1992) is a Sudanese rower. She earned an invitation to compete for Sudan at the 2020 Summer Olympics in Tokyo, Japan. She was one of the flagbearers for Sudan during the 2020 Summer Olympics Parade of Nations as part of the opening ceremony on 23 July 2021, along with swimmer Abobakr Abass. She competed in the women's single sculls event as a tripartite invitation, and was the first athlete to ever represent Sudan in rowing.

Olympic Games
Preceded by Abdalla Targan	Flag bearer for Sudan; Tokyo 2020 with Abobakr Abass	Succeeded by Yaseen Abdalla; Rana Saadeldin
