= Hannah Osborne =

New Zealand rower

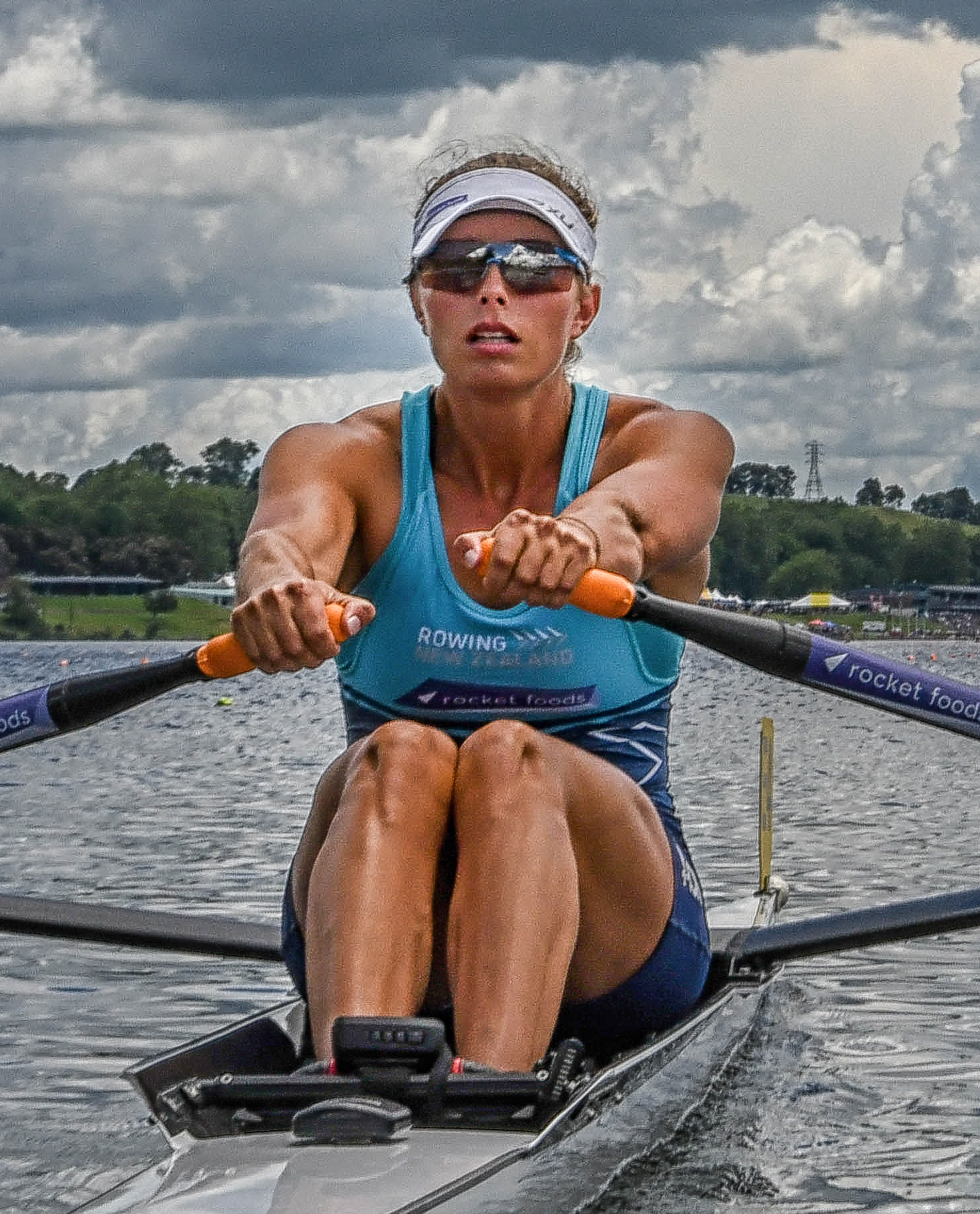
- Osborne in 2018

Personal information
- Born: 10 March 1994 (age 32) Waikato, New Zealand
- Height: 1.75 m (5 ft 9 in)
- Weight: 70 kg (154 lb)

Sport
- Sport: Rowing
- Events: Single scull, Double sculls
Medal record
Women's Rowing
Representing New Zealand
Olympic Games
Silver medal – second place	2020 Tokyo	Double sculls
World Championships (junior)
Bronze medal – third place	2012 Plovdiv	Quadruple sculls

Hannah Osborne (born 10 March 1994) is a New Zealand rower. A member of the national squad, she qualified for the 2020 Summer Olympics. In a surprise move, she was selected in the double scull alongside Brooke Donoghue, displacing the reigning twice world champion Olivia Loe. Osborne and Donoghue raced to a silver medal in Tokyo.

== Early life ==
Osborne was born in 1994, the eldest of four children. Her parents divorced when she was young, and she grew up with her father; her siblings went with her mother. She was raised on a 3,000-acre sheep and beef farm run by her father and grandfather not far from Waitomo Caves. She initially attended Piopio College in the Waitomo District and then switched to Waikato Diocesan School in Hamilton.

== Rowing career ==
While Osborne was at Piopio College, she took up rowing in 2009 and changed to Waikato Diocesan School as that school offered a rowing programme. For the 2011/12 rowing season, she joined the Waikato Rowing Performance Centre and was sent to the 2012 World Rowing Junior Championships in Plovdiv, Bulgaria. Competing in the quad scull, her team (including Ruby Tew and Zoe McBride) won a bronze medal. The following year, she raced the quad scull in the 2013 World Rowing U23 Championships in Ottensheim, Austria, where her team (including Olivia Loe) came fifth. After that season, Osborne transferred to the University of Virginia (UVA) for study and further rowing. In October 2014, Osborne was part of the women's UVA eight that won the Head of the Charles Regatta in Boston, Massachusetts, United States. After problems at UVA, she transferred to the University of California, Berkeley.

Osborne returned to New Zealand in 2015 and competed in the quad scull in the 2016 World Rowing U23 Championships in Rotterdam, Netherlands, where the team came first in the B-final. From the 2016/17 season, she has competed as an elite rower, initially in single scull after single sculler Emma Twigg took time off rowing following the 2016 Summer Olympics. Her first international race as an elite competitor was in the 2017 World Rowing Cup II in Poznań, Poland, where she came fifth. In the 2017 World Rowing Cup III in Lucerne, Switzerland, she came second in the B-final. In her inaugural world championships in 2017 in Sarasota, Florida, she came second in the B-final (eighth overall). She continued in single scull and in the following year, came second in the B-final in the 2018 World Rowing Cup II, fourth in the B-final in the 2018 World Rowing Cup III, and eighth overall in the 2018 World Rowing Championships in Plovdiv. In October 2018, she won the Philadelphia Gold Cup Challenge (single scull) of the Head of the Schuylkill Regatta in Philadelphia, Pennsylvania, United States. She beat Carling Zeeman in a photo finish by 0.06 seconds, with the reigning world champion, Sanita Pušpure, in third place. Twigg had come out of retirement in September 2018, with her eyes set to once again be the nation's representative in single scull.

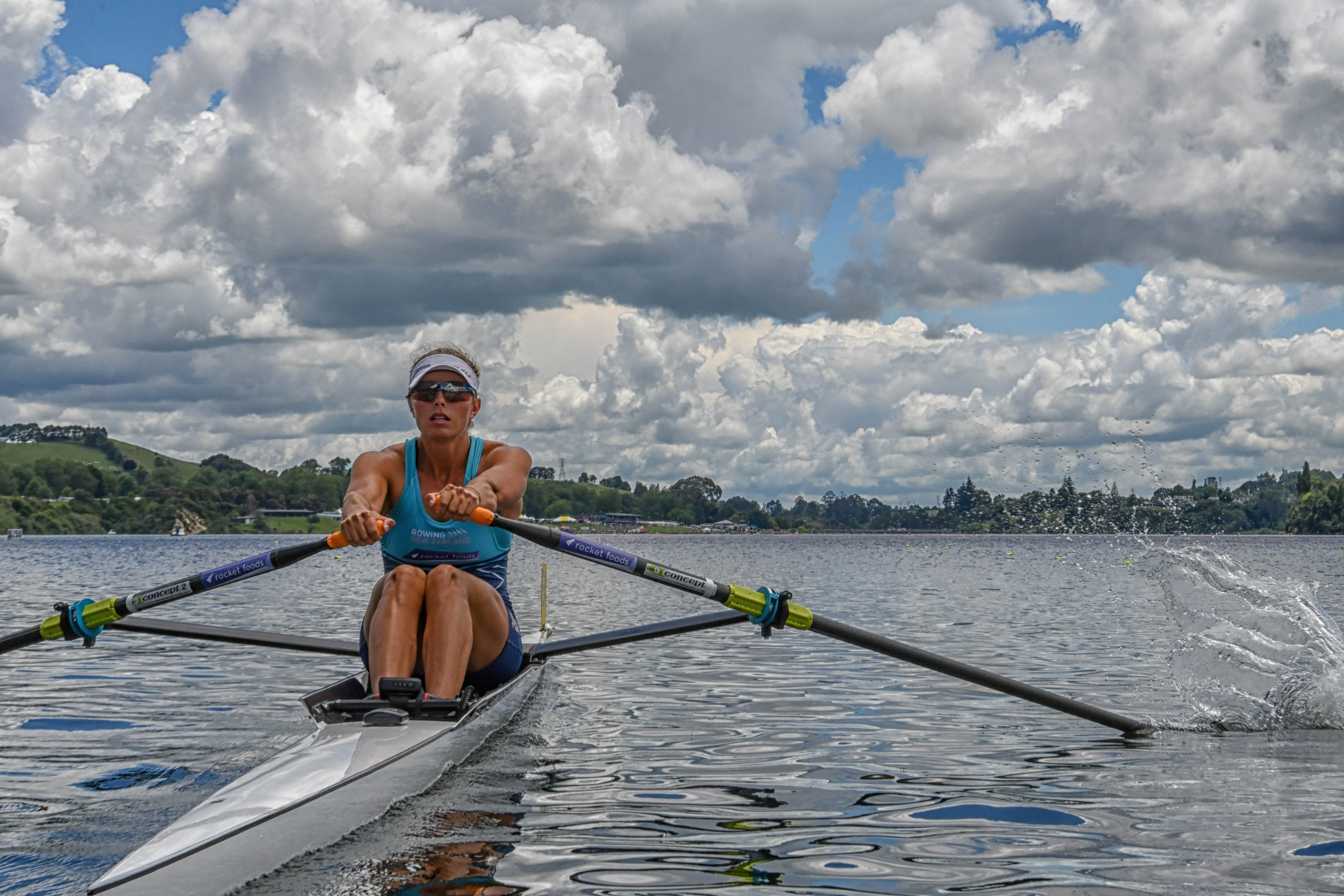
Osborne at the 2018 Christmas Regatta on Lake Karapiro

At the 2019 New Zealand Rowing Championships on Lake Ruataniwha, Twigg regained the national championship in single scull, with Osborne coming eighth. Osborne took out a national title in the quad scull (alongside Twigg, Brooke Donoghue, and Samantha Voss) and the double scull (alongside Donoghue). Osborne initially became a reserve rower for the national team for the 2019 international season. At the 2019 World Rowing Cup II in Poznań, she was called up for the women's four and the team came third in the B-final. In the 2019 World Rowing Championships in Ottensheim, she was called up for a newly formed quad scull and the team gained fifth place in its second event this team was racing in. This fifth place gained New Zealand a quota spot in quad scull for the 2020 Tokyo Olympics. Due to the COVID-19 pandemic, there was no international rowing during 2020.

At the New Zealand Rowing announcement of the female elite team in February 2021, Osborne was part of the quad scull. When the crew selections for Tokyo were made in June 2021, it came as a surprise that Osborne had displaced Olivia Loe, joining Donoghue in the double scull. The Donoghue/Loe duo had been twice world champions in this discipline – 2017 and 2019. Loe was instead selected to the quad scull. Stuff's rowing commentator Ian Anderson considered the women's double scull "to be among NZ's leading medal contenders in Tokyo". Osborne and Donoghue won their heat, placed second in the semi-final and took the silver medal in the Olympic final behind Romania.
