= Rowing at the 2019 African Games =

- Venue: Barrage Mohammed Ben Abdellah
- Location: Salé, Morocco
- Dates: 20–23 August

Rowing at the 2019 African Games was held from 20 to 23 August 2019 in Salé, Morocco.

== Participating nations ==
- Algeria
- Benin
- Djibouti
- Egypt
- Ivory Coast
- Libya
- Morocco
- Nigeria
- Togo
- Tunisia

== Medal table ==
* Host nation (Morocco)

Rank	Nation	Gold	Silver	Bronze	Total
1	Algeria (ALG)	5	1	3	9
2	Tunisia (TUN)	3	3	2	8
3	Egypt (EGY)	1	5	3	9
4	Morocco (MAR)*	0	0	1	1
Totals (4 entries)		9	9	9	27

== Medal summary ==
=== Men ===
Event	Gold	Silver	Bronze
Single sculls 500 metres	Mohamed Taieb; Tunisia	Abdelkhalek El-Banna; Egypt	Oussama Habiche; Algeria
Single sculls 1000 metres	Mohamed Taieb; Tunisia	Abdelkhalek El-Banna; Egypt	Oussama Habiche; Algeria
Lightweight single sculls 500 metres	Mohamed Khalil Mansouri; Tunisia	Sid Ali Boudina; Algeria	Mohamed Kota; Egypt
Lightweight single sculls 1000 metres	Sid Ali Boudina; Algeria	Ahmed Abdelaal; Egypt	Mohamed Khalil Mansouri; Tunisia

=== Women ===
Event	Gold	Silver	Bronze
Single sculls 500 metres	Nawel Chiali; Algeria	Dareen Hegazy; Egypt	Sarah Juliette Saidi Fraincart; Morocco
Single sculls 1000 metres	Nawel Chiali; Algeria	Dareen Hegazy; Egypt	Nour El-Houda Ettaieb; Tunisia
Lightweight single sculls 500 metres	Amina Rouba; Algeria	Khadija Krimi; Tunisia	Maryam Mahmoud; Egypt
Lightweight single sculls 1000 metres	Amina Rouba; Algeria	Khadija Krimi; Tunisia	Maryam Abdellatif; Egypt

=== Mixed ===
Event	Gold	Silver	Bronze
Relay 2 × 500 metres single sculls	Egypt; Abdelkhalek El-Banna; Dareen Hegazy	Tunisia; Khadija Krimi; Mohamed Taieb	Algeria; Kamel Ait Daoud; Nihed Benchadli

== Results ==
=== Single sculls 1000 metres (heats) ===
Rank	Rower	Country	Time	Notes
1	Nawel Chiali	Algeria	3:59.80	
2	Nour El-Houda Ettaieb	Tunisia	3:59.97	
3	Dareen Hegazy	Egypt	4:04.77	
4	Sarah Juliette Saidi Fraincart	Morocco	4:06.31	
5	Glory Abu Semidara	Nigeria	4:24.01	
