= Abobakr Abass =

Sudanese swimmer (born 1998)

Personal information
- Nationality: Sudanese
- Born: 1 November 1998 (age 27)

Sport
- Sport: Swimming
- Strokes: Freestyle, Breaststroke

Abobakr Abass Fadlallah Jalab (born 1 November 1998) is a Sudanese swimmer. He represented Sudan at the 2019 World Aquatics Championships in Gwangju, South Korea. He competed in the men's 50 metre freestyle and men's 100 metre breaststroke events.

He represented Sudan at the 2020 Summer Olympics in Tokyo, Japan. He was one of the flagbearers for Sudan during the 2020 Summer Olympics Parade of Nations as part of the opening ceremony on 23 July 2021, along with rower Esraa Khogali. He competed in the men's 100 metre breaststroke event where he did not advance to compete in the semifinals.

Olympic Games
Preceded by Abdalla Targan	Flag bearer for Sudan; Tokyo 2020 with Esraa Khogali	Succeeded by Yaseen Abdalla; Rana Saadeldin
