= 2004 African Championships in Athletics – Men's 800 metres =

The men's 800 metres event at the 2004 African Championships in Athletics was held in Brazzaville, Republic of the Congo on July 16–17.

== Medalists ==
Gold	Silver	Bronze
William Yiampoy; Kenya	Hezekiél Sepeng; South Africa	Ismail Ahmed Ismail; Sudan

== Results ==
=== Heats ===
Rank	Heat	Name	Nationality	Time	Notes
1	1	Edwin Letting	Kenya	1:47.84	Q
2	1	Ismail Ahmed Ismail	Sudan	1:48.69	Q
3	1	Werner Botha	South Africa	1:49.44	q
4	1	Yassine Bensghir	Morocco	1:50.00	
5	1	Nebse Seyfu	Ethiopia	1:50.17	
6	1	Sidiki Coulibaly	Mali	1:54.54	
1	2	William Yiampoy	Kenya	1:46.27	Q
2	2	Joseph Kagisye	Burundi	1:51.86	Q
3	2	Miakabana Dalien	Republic of the Congo	1:56.62	
4	2	Sonkrea Djongrebele	Chad	1:59.33	
1	3	Hezekiél Sepeng	South Africa	1:48.65	Q
2	3	Khalid Tighazouine	Morocco	1:48.69	Q
3	3	Onalenna Oabona	Botswana	1:49.18	q
4	3	Abdoulaye Wagne	Senegal	1:49.48	
5	3	Fortune Mindonga	Gabon	1:57.58	
6	3	Fofana Sory	Guinea	1:59.83	

=== Final ===
Rank	Name	Nationality	Time	Notes
1st place, gold medalist(s)	William Yiampoy	Kenya	1:45.36	
2nd place, silver medalist(s)	Hezekiél Sepeng	South Africa	1:45.55	
3rd place, bronze medalist(s)	Ismail Ahmed Ismail	Sudan	1:45.55	
4	Edwin Letting	Kenya	1:46.04	
5	Khalid Tighazouine	Morocco	1:46.16	
6	Werner Botha	South Africa	1:48.02	
7	Onalenna Oabona	Botswana	1:51.38	
8	Joseph Kagisye	Burundi	1:51.40	
