= List of flag bearers for Sudan at the Olympics =

Sudan at the Olympics
- IOC code: SUD
- NOC: Sudan Olympic Committee
- Medals: Gold 0 Silver 1 Bronze 0 Total 1

Summer appearances
- 1960; 1964; 1968; 1972; 1976–1980; 1984; 1988; 1992; 1996; 2000; 2004; 2008; 2012; 2016; 2020; 2024

Other related appearances
- South Sudan (2016–pres.)

This is a list of flag bearers who have represented Sudan at the Olympics.

Flag bearers carry the national flag of their country at the opening ceremony of the Olympic Games.

#	Event year	Season	Flag bearer	Sex	Sport
1	1960	Summer			
2	1968	Summer			
3	1972	Summer	Abdel Wahab Abdullah Salih	M	Boxing
4	1984	Summer	Abdul Al-Lalif	M	Official
5	1988	Summer	Omer Khalifa	M	Athletics
6	1992	Summer			
7	1996	Summer	Mahmoud Musa Abdalla	M	Athletics (did not compete)
8	2000	Summer	Mahmoud Kieno	M	Athletics (did not compete)
9	2004	Summer	Todd Matthews Jouda	M	Athletics
10	2008	Summer	Abubaker Kaki Khamis	M	Athletics
11	2012	Summer	Ismail Ahmed Ismail	M	Athletics
12	2016	Summer	Abdalla Targan	M	Athletics
13	2020	Summer	Abobakr Abass	M	Swimming
13	2020	Summer	Esraa Khogali	F	Rowing
14	2024	Summer	Yaseen Abdalla	M	Athletics
14	2024	Summer	Rana Saadeldin	F	Swimming

== See also ==
- Sudan at the Olympics
