= Lu Shiyu =

Chinese rower (born 1999)

Personal information
- Nationality: Chinese
- Born: 3 February 1999 (age 27)

Sport
- Sport: Rowing
Medal record
Women's rowing
Representing China
Asian Games
Gold medal – first place	2022 Hangzhou	Double sculls

Lu Shiyu (born 3 February 1999) is a Chinese rower. She competed in the women's coxless four event at the 2020 Summer Olympics.
