= Ekaterina Kurochkina =

Russian rower

Personal information
- Nationality: Russia
- Born: 25 June 1994 (age 30); Magnitogorsk, Russia

Sport
- Sport: Rowing

Ekaterina Kurochkina (born 25 June 1994) is a Russian rower. She competed in the 2020 Summer Olympics.
