= Lina Šaltytė-Masilionė =

Lithuanian rower (born 1987)

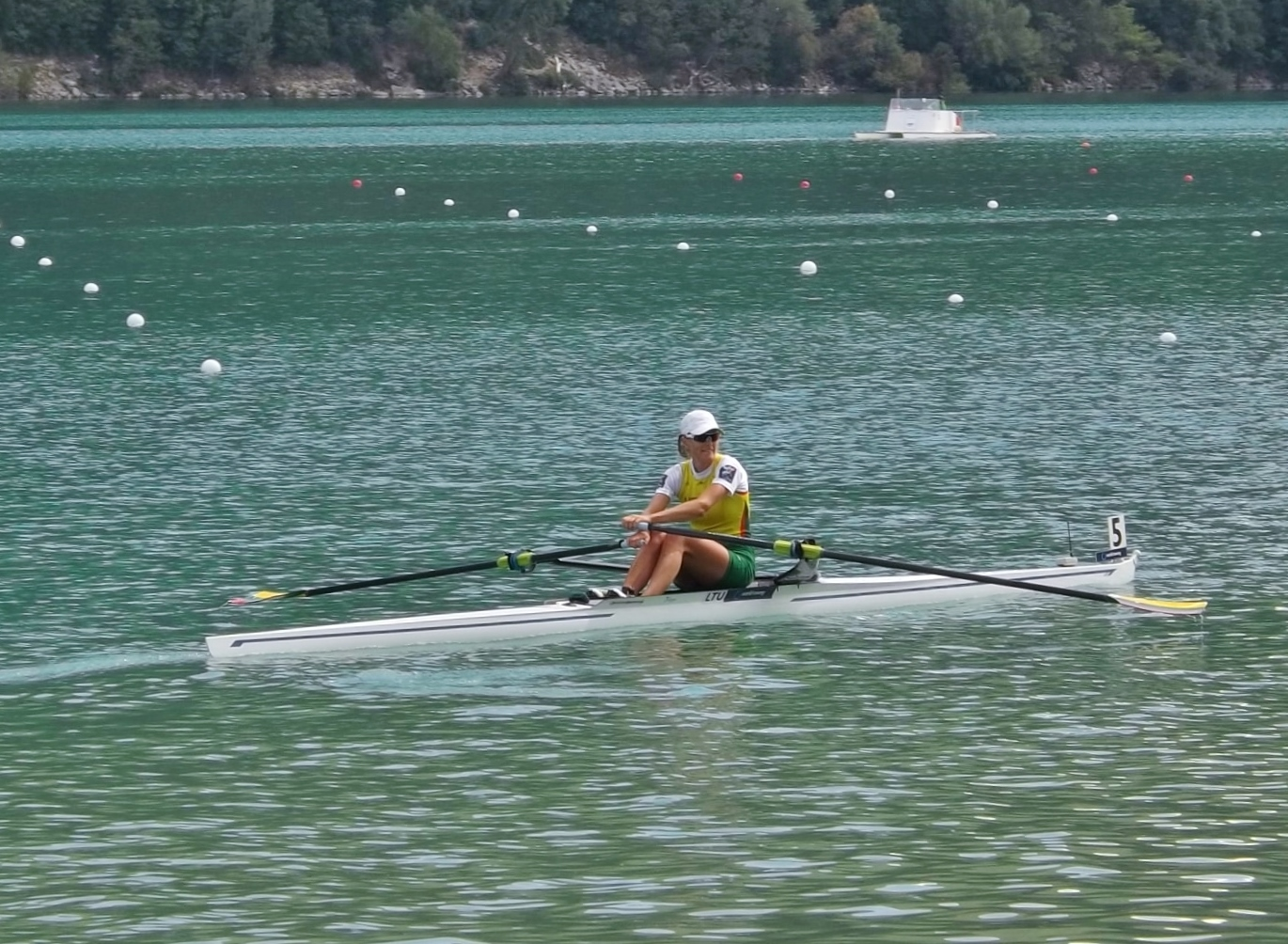
- Šaltytė at 2015 World Championships

Personal information
- Born: 9 February 1987 (age 39)

Lina Šaltytė-Masilionė (born 9 February 1987) is a Lithuanian female rower.

Šaltytė finished 2nd in B final at 2015 World Championships and qualified for the 2016 Summer Olympics.
