= Abdalla Targan =

Sudanese middle-distance runner (born 1996)

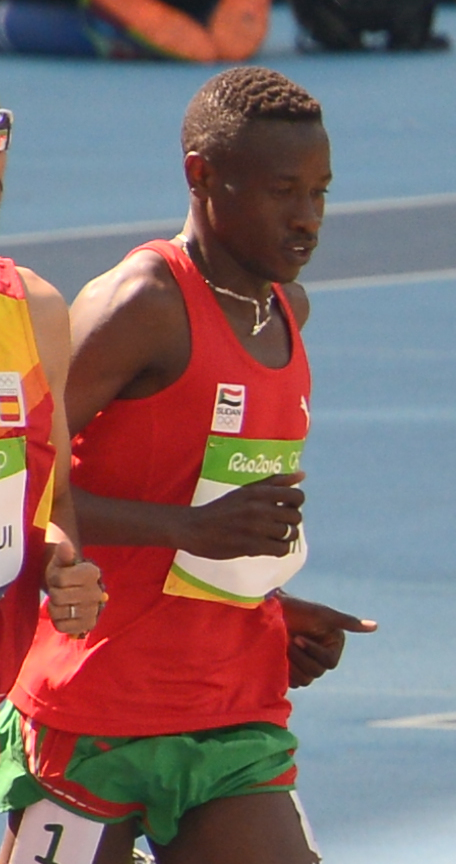
- Targan at the 2016 Olympics

Personal information
- Born: 28 September 1996 (age 29)
- Height: 177 cm (5 ft 10 in)
- Weight: 65 kg (143 lb)

Sport
- Sport: Athletics
- Event(s): 3000 m, steeplechase

Achievements and titles
- Personal best(s): 3000 m – 8:47.31 (2013); 3000 mS – 8:31.20 (2016)

Abdalla Targan, also known as Abdalla Yousif (born 28 September 1996) is a Sudanese middle-distance runner. He competed at the 2016 Summer Olympics in the men's 3000 metres steeplechase; his time of 8:52.20 in the heats did not qualify him for the final. He was the flag bearer for Sudan in the Parade of Nations.

Olympic Games
Preceded by Ismail Ahmed Ismail	Flagbearer for Sudan; Rio de Janeiro 2016	Succeeded by Esraa Khogali; Abobakr Abass
