= Veronica Toro Arana =

Puerto Rican rower (born 1994)

Personal information
- Nationality: Puerto Rico
- Born: 5 August 1994 (age 30); San Juan, Puerto Rico
- Education: Massachusetts Institute of Technology
- Height: 1.78 m (5 ft 10 in)

Sport
- Sport: Rowing

Veronica Toro Arana (born 5 August 1994) is a Puerto Rican rower. She competed in the 2020 Summer Olympics.

Toro Arana went to study at the Massachusetts Institute of Technology in 2012 where she received a BS degree in Biological Engineering in 2016. Subsequently, she is studying for an MD degree at Stanford University School of Medicine.
