= Ismail Ahmed Ismail =

Sudanese runner (born 1984)

Personal information
- Born: 1 November 1984 (age 42)
- Height: 1.91 m (6 ft 3 in)
- Weight: 73 kg (161 lb)

Sport
- Country: Sudan
- Sport: Athletics
- Event: 800 metres
Medal record
Men's athletics
Representing Sudan
Olympic Games
Silver medal – second place	2008 Beijing	800 m
African Championships
Silver medal – second place	2006 Bambous	800 m
Silver medal – second place	2008 Addis Ababa	800 m
Silver medal – second place	2008 Addis Ababa	4×400 m
Bronze medal – third place	2004 Brazzaville	800 m
Afro-Asian Games
Gold medal – first place	2003 Hyderabad	800 m
Pan Arab Games
Silver medal – second place	2011 Doha	800 m
- Updated on 23 July 2012

Ismail Ahmed Ismail (Arabic: اسماعيل احمد اسماعيل, born 1 November 1984) is a Sudanese middle-distance runner who represents Sudan in the 800 metres. He was born in Khartoum. At the 2008 Summer Olympics in Beijing, Ismail won Sudan's first ever Olympic medal, a silver in the men's 800 metres.

== Achievements ==
Year	Competition	Venue	Position	Event	Notes
Representing Sudan
2000	World Junior Championships	Santiago, Chile	21st (h)	800m	1:53.14
2000	World Junior Championships	Santiago, Chile	—	1500m	DQ
2001	World Indoor Championships	Lisbon, Portugal	26th (h)	1500 m	4:02.79
2002	World Junior Championships	Kingston, Jamaica	5th	800 m	1:47.20
2002	African Championships	Radès, Tunisia	10th (h)	800 m	1:49.18
2003	World Championships	Paris, France	18th (h)	800 m	1:47.21
2003	All-Africa Games	Abuja, Nigeria	5th	800 m	1:47.29
2003	Afro-Asian Games	Hyderabad, India	1st	800 m	1:46.92
2004	African Championships	Brazzaville, Republic of the Congo	3rd	800 m	1:45.87
2004	Olympic Games	Athens, Greece	8th	800 m	1:52.49
2004	Pan Arab Games	Algiers, Algeria	2nd	800 m	1:46.24
2005	Islamic Solidarity Games	Mecca, Saudi Arabia	3rd	800 m	1:47.20
2005	Islamic Solidarity Games	Mecca, Saudi Arabia	2nd	4 × 400 m relay	3:08.81
2006	African Championships	Bambous, Mauritius	2nd	800 m	1:46.65
2008	African Championships	Addis Ababa, Ethiopia	2nd	800 m	1:45.41
2008	African Championships	Addis Ababa, Ethiopia	2nd	4 × 400 m relay	3:04.00
2008	Olympic Games	Beijing, China	2nd	800 m	1:44.70
2009	World Championships	Berlin, Germany	24th (sf)	800 m	DNF
2010	World Indoor Championships	Doha, Qatar	4th	800 m	1:46.90
2011	World Championships	Daegu, South Korea	39th (h)	800 m	1:52.33
2011	Pan Arab Games	Doha, Qatar	2nd	800 m	1:46.60
2011	Pan Arab Games	Doha, Qatar	2nd	4 × 400 m relay	3:07.47
2012	World Indoor Championships	Istanbul, Turkey	17th (h)	800 m	1:50.72
2015	African Games	Brazzaville, Republic of the Congo	–	800 m	DNF

=== Personal bests ===
- 800 metres – 1:43.82 min (2009)
- 1500 metres – 3:41.97 min (2005)

Olympic Games
Preceded by Abubaker Kaki Khamis	Flagbearer for Sudan; 2012 London	Succeeded by Abdalla Targan
