= Magdalena Lobnig =

Austrian rower (born 1990)

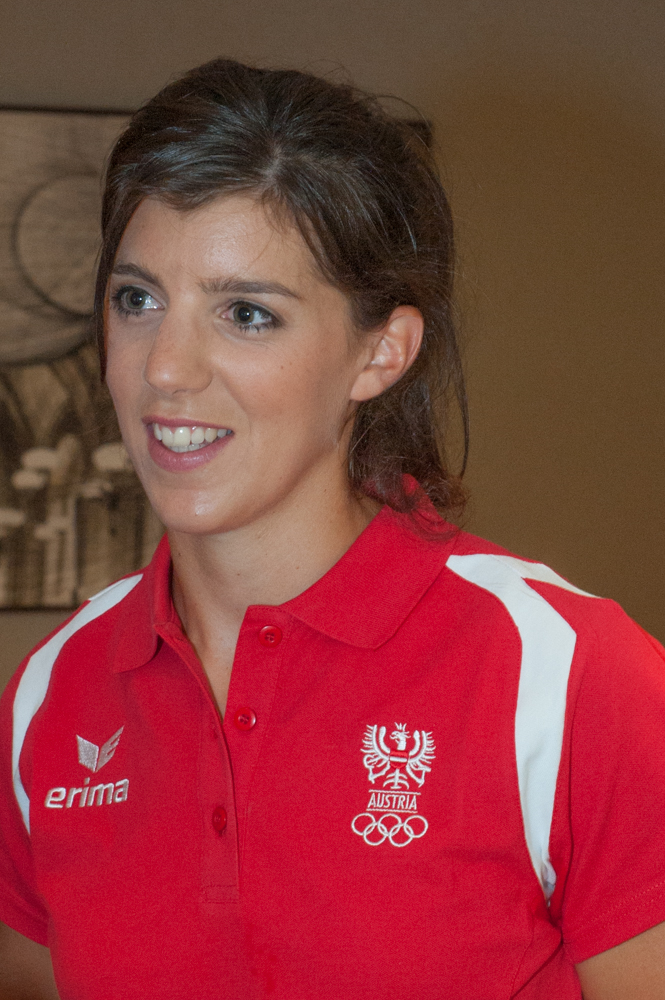
- Lobnig at the 2016 Summer Olympics

Personal information
- Nationality: Austrian
- Born: 19 July 1990 (age 35) Sankt Veit an der Glan, Austria
- Height: 180 cm (5 ft 11 in) (2016)
- Weight: 71 kg (157 lb) (2016)

Sport
- Country: Austria
- Sport: Rowing
Medal record
Women's rowing
Representing Austria
Olympic Games
Bronze medal – third place	2020 Tokyo	Single sculls
World Championships
Bronze medal – third place	2017 Sarasota	Single sculls
Bronze medal – third place	2018 Plovdiv	Single sculls
European Championships
Gold medal – first place	2016 Brandenburg	Single sculls
Silver medal – second place	2013 Seville	Single sculls
Silver medal – second place	2018 Glasgow	Single sculls
Silver medal – second place	2020 Poznan	Single sculls
World Championships (U23)
Gold medal – first place	2012 Trakai	Double sculls
Bronze medal – third place	2011 Amsterdam	Double sculls

Magdalena Lobnig (born 19 July 1990 in Sankt Veit an der Glan) is an Austrian rower. She won the double scull World U23 Championship in 2012 and the singles European Championship in 2016. In 2021, at the 2020 Summer Olympics she won the bronze medal in the Women's single sculls event.
