= Eleonora Trivella =

Italian female rower

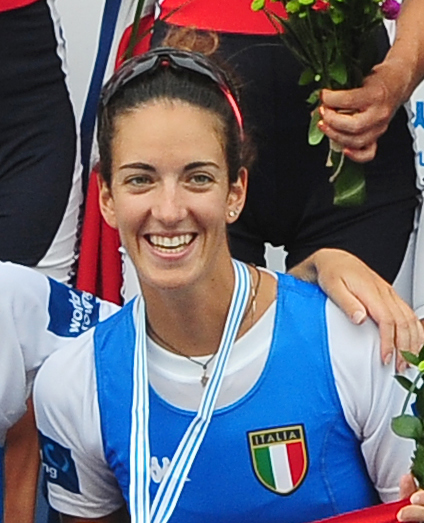
- Trivella in 2013.

Personal information
- National team: Italy
- Born: 30 January 1990 (age 36) Pisa, Italy
- Height: 1.75 m (5 ft 9 in)
- Weight: 60 kg (132 lb)

Sport
- Sport: Rowing
- Club: Licioo Giacomelli S.C.
- Coached by: Lelio Lunardini
Medal record
Event	1st	2nd	3rd
World Championships	0	0	1
World U23 Championships	1	1	0
World Junior Championships	0	0	1
European Championships	1	0	0
Universiade	0	0	2
Total	2	1	4

Eleonora Trivella (born 30 January 1990) is an Italian lightweight rower bronze medal winner at senior level at the World Rowing Championships.

== Achievements ==
Year	Competition	Venue	Rank	Event	Time
2013	World Championships	(South Korea) Chungju	3rd	Lightweight quadruple sculls	6:57.06
