= Yaseen Abdalla =

Sudanese-American long-distance runner

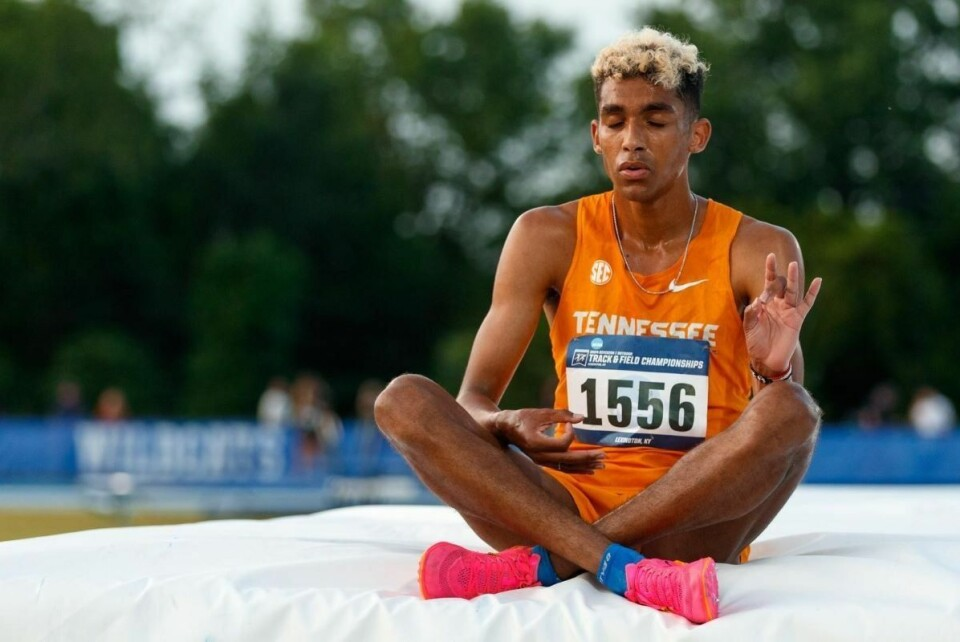
- Abdalla in 2024

Personal information
- Nationality: Sudanese-American
- Born: August 13, 2001 (age 25)
- Home town: Lanham, Maryland, United States

Sport
- Country: Sudan
- Sport: Athletics
- Events: 1500 metres; 3000 metres; 5000 metres; 10,000 metres; Half marathon; Marathon
- University team: Texas Longhorns; Tennessee Volunteers; Arkansas Razorbacks

Achievements and titles
- Personal bests: Mile: 3:55.31i NR (Arkansas, 2025); 3000 m: 7:34.17i NR (Boston, 2024); 5000 m: 13:09.99i NR (Boston, 2025); Half marathon: 59:12 NR (Valencia, 2026); Marathon: 2:11:41 NR (Paris, 2024)

Yaseen Abdalla (born August 13, 2001) is a Sudanese-American long-distance runner who represents Sudan in international competition. He holds Sudanese national records in the half marathon, marathon, indoor mile, 3000 metres and 5000 metres. At the 2026 Valencia Half Marathon, he finished eighth in 59:12, setting a Sudanese record in his debut at the distance.

Abdalla competed collegiately for the Texas Longhorns, Tennessee Volunteers and Arkansas Razorbacks. While at Texas, he won an NCAA national championship as a member of the distance medley relay team at the 2022 NCAA Division I Indoor Track and Field Championships.

== Athletic career ==
=== High school ===
Abdalla attended Lyndon B. Johnson High School in Austin, Texas, from 2016 to 2019. He began running in his sophomore year. By his senior year, he had finished third at the Texas state cross country meet and sixth at the Nike South Regional Championships, where he ran 15:45.64. He also placed 15th at the Foot Locker South Regional Championships in 15:34.0.

=== Collegiate career ===
==== Texas (2019–2022) ====
Abdalla joined the University of Texas at Austin's cross country and track and field programs as a walk-on in 2019. He did not compete in cross country that fall. The 2020 outdoor track season was canceled because of the COVID-19 pandemic.

In the 2020 cross country season, he recorded a time of 24:06.20 over 8 km and finished the Big 12 Championships in 24:38.80 as Texas placed third in the team standings. At the 2021 Big 12 indoor championships, he placed among the top ten in both the 3000 metres (8:13.51) and 5000 metres (14:36.26). He finished tenth in the 10,000 metres at the 2021 Big 12 outdoor championships in 29:51.53.

During the 2021 cross country season, Abdalla recorded an 8 km best of 23:28.20 and finished 20th at the Big 12 Championships. He placed fourth at the NCAA regional meet in 30:18.60 over 10 km and earned All-America honors at the NCAA Cross Country Championships, running 29:28.10.

At the 2022 NCAA Division I Indoor Track and Field Championships, Abdalla ran the anchor leg for Texas's winning distance medley relay team, which finished in 9:25.20. Texas also won the men's overall team championship. Earlier that season, he had won the Big 12 indoor 5000-metre title in a school-record 13:33.26 and finished third in the conference 3000 metres in 7:56.29. He subsequently placed second in the 5000 metres at the Big 12 outdoor championships.

==== Tennessee (2022–2024) ====
Abdalla transferred to the University of Tennessee ahead of the 2022 cross country season. He placed third in the SEC cross country championships in 22:45.57 over 8 km and second at the NCAA regional championship, helping Tennessee win the team title. He finished 33rd at the NCAA Cross Country Championships to earn another All-America honor.

In the 2023 indoor season, Abdalla set a Tennessee school record and Sudanese national record of 7:42.23 in the 3000 metres. He finished second in the 5000 metres at the SEC indoor championships and placed 12th in the 3000 metres at the NCAA indoor championships. Outdoors, he won SEC silver in the 10,000 metres and finished 12th in the 5000 metres at the NCAA championships.

During the 2023 cross country season, he placed fourth at the SEC Championships and third at the NCAA regional championships, helping Tennessee win another regional team title. At the 2024 SEC indoor championships, he was runner-up in the 3000 metres in 7:52.32. He also placed third in the 10,000 metres at the 2024 SEC outdoor championships and competed in the 5000 metres at the NCAA outdoor championships.

==== Arkansas (2024–2025) ====
In July 2024, Abdalla transferred to the University of Arkansas. He finished fifth at the 2024 SEC Cross Country Championships, contributing to Arkansas's team victory. At the 2024 NCAA Cross Country Championships, he finished fourth individually in 28:41.5 over 10 km as Arkansas placed third as a team.

On December 7, 2024, Abdalla set an Arkansas school record in the indoor 3000 metres with a time of 7:34.17 in Boston. He also ran 13:22.29 in the 5000 metres at the same meet, breaking another school record. On February 14, 2025, he lowered the Arkansas indoor 5000-metre record to 13:09.99 at the David Hemery Valentine Invitational in Boston.

=== International career ===
Abdalla represented Sudan in the 5000 metres at the 2022 World Athletics Championships.

In 2024, he was selected to represent Sudan in the men's marathon at the 2024 Summer Olympics in Paris, despite having no previous official marathon result. In his debut at the distance, he finished 33rd in 2:11:41, setting a Sudanese national record.

At the 2025 World Athletics Championships in Tokyo, Abdalla placed 21st in the marathon with a time of 2:13:32.

On October 25, 2026, Abdalla made his half-marathon debut at the Valencia Half Marathon, placing eighth in 59:12. The performance established a Sudanese national record.

== See also ==
- Sudan at the 2024 Summer Olympics
- List of flag bearers for Sudan at the Olympics

Olympic Games
Preceded by Abobakr Abass; Esraa Khogali	Flag bearer for Sudan; Paris 2024 with Rana Saadeldin	Incumbent
