= Svetlana Germanovich =

Kazakhstani rower (born 1986)

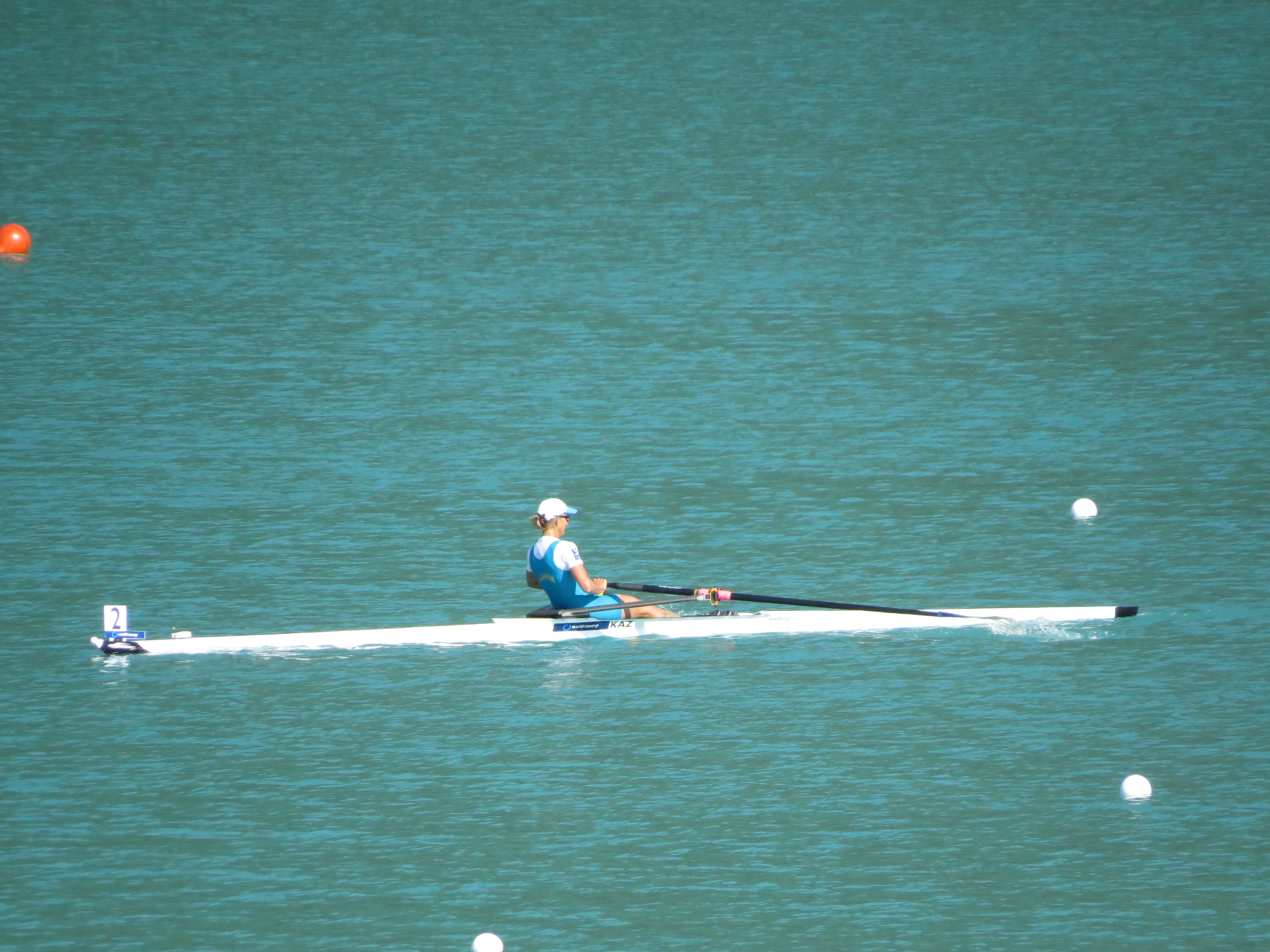

Svetlana Germanovich (born 21 September 1986, in Temirtau) is a Kazakhstani rower. She competed in the single sculls race at the 2012 Summer Olympics and placed 1st in Final E and 25th overall.
