= Kara Kohler =

American rower (born 1991)

Personal information
- Full name: Kara Michelle Kohler
- Born: January 20, 1991 (age 35) Clayton, California, U.S.
- Height: 6 ft 2 in (188 cm)
- Weight: 181 lb (82 kg)

Sport
- Country: United States
- Sport: Rowing
- Events: Single sculls, Quadruple sculls, Coxless four
Medal record
Women's rowing
Representing United States
Olympic Games
| Bronze medal – third place | 2012 London | Quadruple sculls |
World Championships
| Gold medal – first place | 2011 Bled | Coxless four |
| Bronze medal – third place | 2019 Ottensheim | Single sculls |

Kara Michelle Kohler (/ˈkɛərə ˈkoʊlər/ KAIR-ə KOH-lər; born January 20, 1991) is an American female crew rower. She won the bronze medal at the 2012 Summer Olympics in the quadruple sculls event. She also has a World Championship gold medal in the coxless four and a World Championship bronze in the single sculls.

== Career ==
Kohler swam through high school and started rowing at University of California, Berkeley. In 2011, she was named a Division I first team All-American. She was a member of the crew that won the I Eight at the 2013 NCAA Rowing Championships. Within two years of starting to row, she was part of the United States under-23 team, winning a gold medal in the women's eights at the 2010 U-23 World Championship.

In 2011 Kohler was part of the US team that won the coxless four at the World Championships, alongside Sarah Zelenka, Emily Regan and Sara Hendershot.

2012 saw Kohler, Natalie Dell, Megan Kalmoe and Adrienne Martelli win bronze in the women's quadruple sculls at the Olympic Games. She was not selected for the 2016 Summer Olympics, and nearly quit rowing.

After switching to the single sculls in 2018, Kohler won the bronze medal at the 2019 World Championships. That year, she was also named US Rowing's female Rower of the Year.

On February 26, 2021, Kohler won the USA Olympic Trials race for single sculls to qualify for the Tokyo Olympics

In 2022, Kohler won the Princess Royal Challenge Cup (the premier women's singles sculls event) at the Henley Royal Regatta, rowing for the Texas Rowing Center.
