= Jeong Hye-jeong =

South Korean rower

Personal information
- Nationality: South Korea
- Born: 5 January 1997 (age 28)
- Height: 1.70 m (5 ft 7 in)

Sport
- Sport: Rowing

Jeong Hye-jeong (Korean: 정혜정, born 5 January 1997) is a South Korean rower. She competed in the 2020 Summer Olympics.
