= Lovisa Claesson =

Swedish rower

Personal information
- Nationality: Swedish
- Born: 21 February 1995 (age 30)

Sport
- Sport: Rowing

Lovisa Claesson (born 21 February 1995) is a Swedish rower. She competed in the women's single sculls event at the 2020 Summer Olympics.

Her father, Per-Olof, represented Sweden in rowing at the 1988 and 1992 Summer Olympics.
