= Sanita Pušpure =

Latvian-born, Irish rower (born 1981)

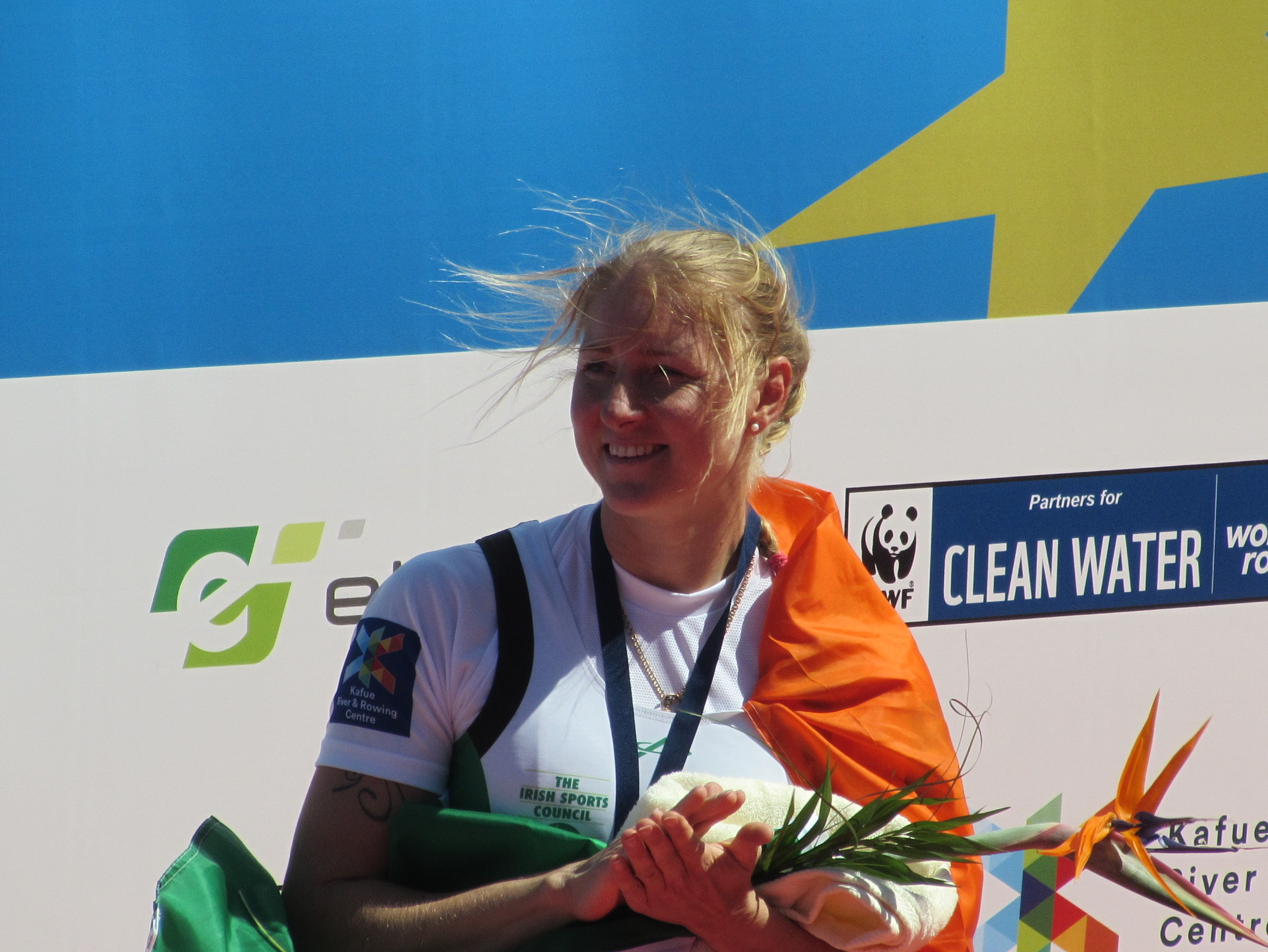

Personal information
- Nationality: Latvia/Irish
- Born: 21 December 1981 (age 44) Latvia, USSR
- Height: 1.79 m (5 ft 10 in)
- Weight: 72 kg (159 lb)

Sport
- Country: Latvia; Ireland
- Sport: Rowing
- Event(s): Single sculls, Double sculls
- Club: Old Collegians
Medal record
Women's rowing
Representing Ireland
World Championships
Gold medal – first place	2018 Plovdiv	Single sculls
Gold medal – first place	2019 Ottensheim	Single sculls
Bronze medal – third place	2022 Račice	Double sculls
European Championships
Gold medal – first place	2019 Lucerne	Single sculls
Gold medal – first place	2020 Poznań	Single sculls
Bronze medal – third place	2014 Belgrade	Single sculls
Bronze medal – third place	2016 Brandenburg	Single sculls
Representing Latvia
World Rowing U23 Regatta
Bronze medal – third place	Amsterdam 2003	Single sculls
World University Championships
Gold medal – first place	2004 Brive-la-Gaillarde	Double sculls

Sanita Pušpure ([ˈsɑn̪it̪ɑ ˈpuʃpure]; born 21 December 1981) is a Latvian-born Irish rower. She was a back-to-back world champion in the women's single scull, winning her title at the 2018 World Rowing Championships in Plovdiv and defending it at the 2019 World Rowing Championships in Ottensheim. She initially competed for Latvia at a junior level, but she moved to Ireland in 2006 and began competing for her adopted country in 2010 before gaining full Irish nationality in 2011. She was selected as the sole rowing competitor for Ireland at the 2012 Summer Olympics. In May 2016, she qualified for the Women's single sculls at the 2016 Summer Olympics. Pušpure is now head coach of UCC Rowing Club in Cork.

== Career ==
She began her rowing career in her native Latvia. In 2003, she placed third in the single scull competition at the World under-23 Championships. In the following year took the gold medal in the double scull at the World Student Games.

She moved to Ireland in 2006, when her husband Kaspar got a job at Dublin Airport, and they initially lived in Cork. In 2009, she won the single sculls event at the Irish Championships, repeating that success at the following year's competition and taking the double sculls title too.

Pušpure began competing for Ireland in World Cup events during 2010 but was only allowed to compete at the World Championships after she gained Irish nationality in 2011. She was in the winning teams in the double and quad sculls at the Henley Women's Regatta in 2011. She initially aimed to qualify for the 2012 Olympics in the double scull, partnered with Lisa Dilleen. The duo finished in twelfth place at the 2011 World Championships, where the top eight teams qualified for the Olympics.

She competed in the single scull event for the first time at a World Cup event in Belgrade in May 2012, finishing in fifth place. At the Olympic qualification event in Lucerne, Switzerland, she placed second in her heat in order to make it through to the semi-final. After finishing third in the semi, she placed fourth in the final, giving Ireland a place in the women's single sculls competition at the 2012 Summer Olympics. She was selected for the Irish team at the Games as the country's only rowing competitor, and their first female single sculler since the 1980 Summer Olympics. She reached the quarter-finals of the event.

In September 2018 she won the single sculls at the world championships in Plovdiv, Bulgaria, her first world title. She defended her title a year later in Linz-Ottensheim, Austria, and also qualified at the event for the 2020 Olympics. Puspure was selected as a 2021 Tokyo Olympian but had to settle for the B final in the women's single scull.

== Personal life ==
She lives with her family in Ballincollig, County Cork. Both of her children were born in Ireland. Pušpure races for Old Collegians Boat Club.
