= Jeannine Gmelin =

Swiss rower

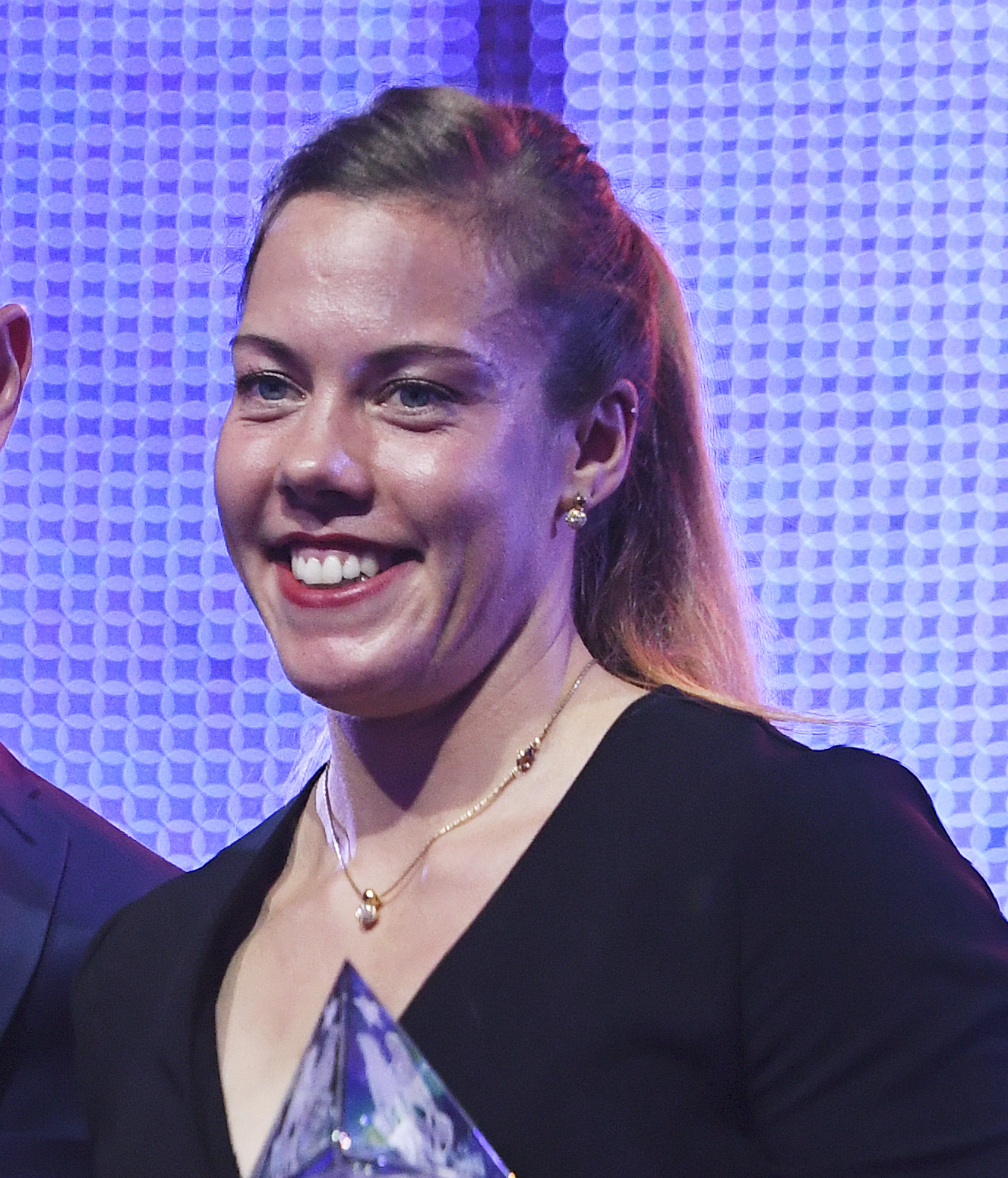
- Gmelin in 2017

Personal information
- Nationality: Swiss
- Born: 20 June 1990 (age 36) Uster

Sport
- Sport: Rowing
Medal record
Women's rowing
Representing Switzerland
World Championships
Gold medal – first place	2017 Sarasota	Single sculls
Silver medal – second place	2018 Plovdiv	Single sculls
European Championships
Gold medal – first place	2018 Glasgow	Single sculls
Silver medal – second place	2015 Poznań	Single sculls
Silver medal – second place	2019 Lucerne	Single sculls
Bronze medal – third place	2021 Varese	Single sculls

Jeannine Gmelin (born 20 June 1990) is a Swiss competitive rower.

== Biography ==
Gmelin competed at the 2016 Summer Olympics in Rio de Janeiro, in the women's single sculls, and went on to win the 2017 World Rowing Championships – Women's single sculls.

In 2018 Gmelin won the Princess Royal Challenge Cup (the premier women's singles sculls event) at the Henley Royal Regatta, rowing for RC Uster.
