= Jiang Yan (rower) =

Chinese rower (born 1989)

Personal information
- Born: 10 January 1989 (age 36); Qingdao, China

Sport
- Sport: Rowing

Jiang Yan (Chinese: 江燕; pinyin: Jiāng Yàn; born 10 January 1989) is a Chinese rower. She competed in the women's quadruple sculls event at the 2016 Summer Olympics.
