= Tala Abujbara =

Qatari rower (born 1992)

Personal information
- Nationality: Qatari
- Born: 22 July 1992 (age 33)
- Education: HEC Paris; Williams College
- Height: 178 cm (5 ft 10 in) (1.78 m)
- Weight: 71 kg (157 lb)

Sport
- Sport: Rowing

Tala Abujbara (Arabic: تالا أبو جبارة, also transliterated as Tala Abu-Jubara, born 22 July 1992) is a Qatari rower. She competed in the women's single sculls event at the 2020 Summer Olympics.

== Career ==
Tala Abujbara learned to row while studying at Williams College, where a coach saw her potential, and she joined the team. Upon returning home to Qatar, she had nobody to pair with, so she switched to the single sculls.

In August 2018, she qualified for Repechages and ranked sixth in Palembang women’s single sculls of rowing at the 2018 Asian Games. Abujbara also represented Qatar in the summer 2020 Tokyo Olympics. She qualified for the Tokyo Olympics after reaching a time of 8:20 minutes at the Asia and Oceania Rowing Qualification Championship.

In July 2021, Abujbara took first place in the semi-final race to qualify for the E final of the Women’s Single Scull event at the Tokyo Olympics, which she won and placed on rank 25 overall.

Tala Abujbara is also graduated from HEC Paris.

== Recognition ==
On 6 July 2021, the Qatar Olympic Committee (QOC) announced that Tala Abujbara was appointed the first Qatari female athlete to represent Qatar in Rowing at the Olympic Games.

On 22 July 2021, the QOC announced that Tala Abujbara, along with Mohammed Al-Rumaihi, would raise Qatar’s flag at the opening of the Tokyo Olympics. The first Olympics edition was where two athletes carried their country’s flag.
