= Felice Chow =

Trinidad and Tobago rower (born 1977)

Personal information
- Nationality: Trinidad and Tobago
- Born: 15 June 1977 (age 49) Port of Spain, Trinidad and Tobago

Sport
- Sport: Rowing
Medal record
Women's rowing
Representing Trinidad and Tobago
Pan American Games
Silver medal – second place	2019 Lima	Single sculls

Felice Aisha Chow (born 15 June 1977 ) is a Trinidad and Tobago competitive rower.

She was the first athlete to ever represent Trinidad and Tobago in rowing at the Olympics and competed at the 2016 Summer Olympics in Rio de Janeiro and at the 2020 Summer Olympics in Tokyo, in the women's single sculls.

She is a 2018 CAC Games silver medalist and 2019 PanAm silver medalist (women's single sculls).
