= Huang Yi-ting =

Taiwanese rower (born 1990)

Personal information
- Nationality: Taiwanese
- Born: 16 January 1990 (age 36)

Sport
- Sport: Rowing

Huang Yi-ting (born 16 January 1990) is a Taiwanese competitive rower.

At the Olympic qualifying events in April 2016 she came first beating Mahsa Javar from Iran.

She competed at the 2016 Summer Olympics in Rio de Janeiro, in the women's single sculls.
