= Joan Poh =

Singaporean rower (born 1991)

Personal information
- National team: Singapore
- Born: 14 April 1991 (age 35) Singapore

Sport
- Sport: Rowing
Medal record
Women's rowing
Southeast Asian Games
Bronze medal – third place	2015 Singapore	1,000m women’s coxless pair

Joan Poh OLY (born 14 April 1991) is a Singaporean rower. She competed in the 2020 Summer Olympics.

== Education ==
Poh studied nursing at Nanyang Polytechnic (NYP) and National University of Singapore (NUS).

== Career ==
Poh works as a staff nurse in the renal unit of Tan Tock Seng Hospital.

=== Sporting career ===
Poh was part of NYP's dragonboat team and was one of the best paddlers. In 2009, she was called up to the national women's team, and represented Singapore at the 2011 Southeast Asian Games in dragon-boating but did not win any medals. Poh then left the national team but joined the NUS's dragonboat team.

The Singapore Sailing Federation and Sport Singapore started a talent scouting programme to find a sailing partner for Dawn Liu in the women's 470 for the 2013 SEA Games held in Myanmar. Initially not chosen as the sailing partner for Liu, after the selected partner failed with Liu, Poh was eventually chosen as Liu's partner. Due to little time left for preparation, they failed to qualify for the Games.

Poh and Liu decided to change to the 49erFX class and attempted to qualify for the 2016 Summer Olympics held at Rio de Janeiro in Brazil. However Liu broke her hand during the International Sailing Federation World Championships in Spain in September 2014, ending their qualification attempt.

Liu ended their partnership eight months before the 2015 SEA Games held in Singapore. Poh failed to find another partner and unsuccessful attempted change to keelboat as the team was already formed. On a friend's suggestion, Poh changed to rowing just before the 2015 Southeast Asian Games. She represented Singapore in the 1,000m women's coxless pair with Joanna Chan where they won the bronze medal.

At the 2021 FISA Asia & Oceania Olympic Qualification Regatta in Tokyo, Japan, Poh placed 12th but Singapore received an invitation from World Rowing to send her to the 2020 Summer Olympics, as the next highest-ranked nation vying for qualification. On her Olympics debut, Poh finished 28th out of 32 athletes in the women's single sculls event.

In 2024, Poh was not selected for the qualification trials for he 2024 Summer Olympics as she failed to emerge as the fastest rower in the national selection trials, losing to Saiyidah Aisyah, who made a comeback from retirement for the Olympics Games.
