= Maike Diekmann =

Namibian rower

Maike Betts OLY
Personal information
- National team: Namibia
- Born: Namibia

Sport
- Sport: Rowing

Maike Betts (née Diekmann) is a Namibian rower. She competed in the women's single sculls event at the 2020 Summer Olympics.

She began rowing during her third year attending Rhodes University in South Africa and represented Namibia for the first time at the 2015 African Olympic Qualification Regatta held in Tunisia.

Olympic Games
Preceded by Jonas Junias	Flag bearer for Namibia; Tokyo 2020 with Jonas Junias	Succeeded by Vera Looser; Alex Miller
