= Carling Zeeman =

Canadian rower

Personal information
- Born: May 27, 1991 (age 35) Hamilton, Ontario, Canada
- Height: 187 cm (6 ft 2 in)
- Weight: 82 kg (181 lb)

Sport
- Sport: Rowing
- Events: Single sculls, quad sculls
- College team: Laurentian University Voyageurs
- Coached by: Dick Tonks
Medal record
Women's rowing
Representing Canada
World Rowing Championships
Silver medal – second place	2013 Chungju	Quadruple sculls
Pan American Games
Gold medal – first place	2015 Toronto	Single sculls
Gold medal – first place	2015 Toronto	Quadruple sculls

Carling Zeeman (born May 27, 1991) is a Canadian rower. She competed at several World cups, international events, along with the 2015 Pan American Games. Zeeman is a former world championships silver medallist in the women's quadruple sculls event. More recently she won gold in the women's single sculls at World Rowing Cup I regatta in Varese, Italy, and a silver at the 2017 World Rowing Cup 3 regatta in Lucerne Switzerland.

In June 2016, she was officially named to Canada's 2016 Olympic team. At the 2016 Summer Olympics Carling placed 10th.

In June 2021, Zeeman was named to her second Olympic team.
