= South Sudan at the 2016 Summer Olympics =

- IOC code: SSD
- NOC: South Sudan National Olympic Committee

in Rio de Janeiro
- Competitors: 3 in 1 sport
- Flag bearer: Guor Marial
- Medals: Gold 0 Silver 0 Bronze 0 Total 0

Summer Olympics appearances (overview)
- 2016; 2020; 2024; 2028

Other related appearances
- Sudan (1960–pres.); Independent Olympic Athletes (2012)

South Sudan competed at the 2016 Summer Olympics in Rio de Janeiro, Brazil, from 5 to 21 August 2016. South Sudan had been an independent nation since 2011, but its civil war had delayed its membership with the International Olympic Committee until 2015, making 2016 its first official appearance at the Olympic Games. The country was offered three universality placements in athletics, as no South Sudanese athletes met the Olympic qualifying standards prior to the Games. Three athletes, two men and one woman, competed in three track and field events, but did not win any medals. The sole woman, Margret Rumat Hassan, was given a spot eight days prior to the start of the Games that had been allotted previously to Mangar Makur Chuot. This change was against the advice of the South Sudan Athletics Federation and was due allegedly to pressure from Samsung, for whom Hassan had appeared in an advertisement. The flagbearer for both the opening and closing ceremony was Guor Marial, a marathon runner who, then unable to represent South Sudan, had competed as an Independent Olympic Athlete in 2012. Five South Sudanese nationals also competed as members of the Refugee Olympic Team.

== Background ==
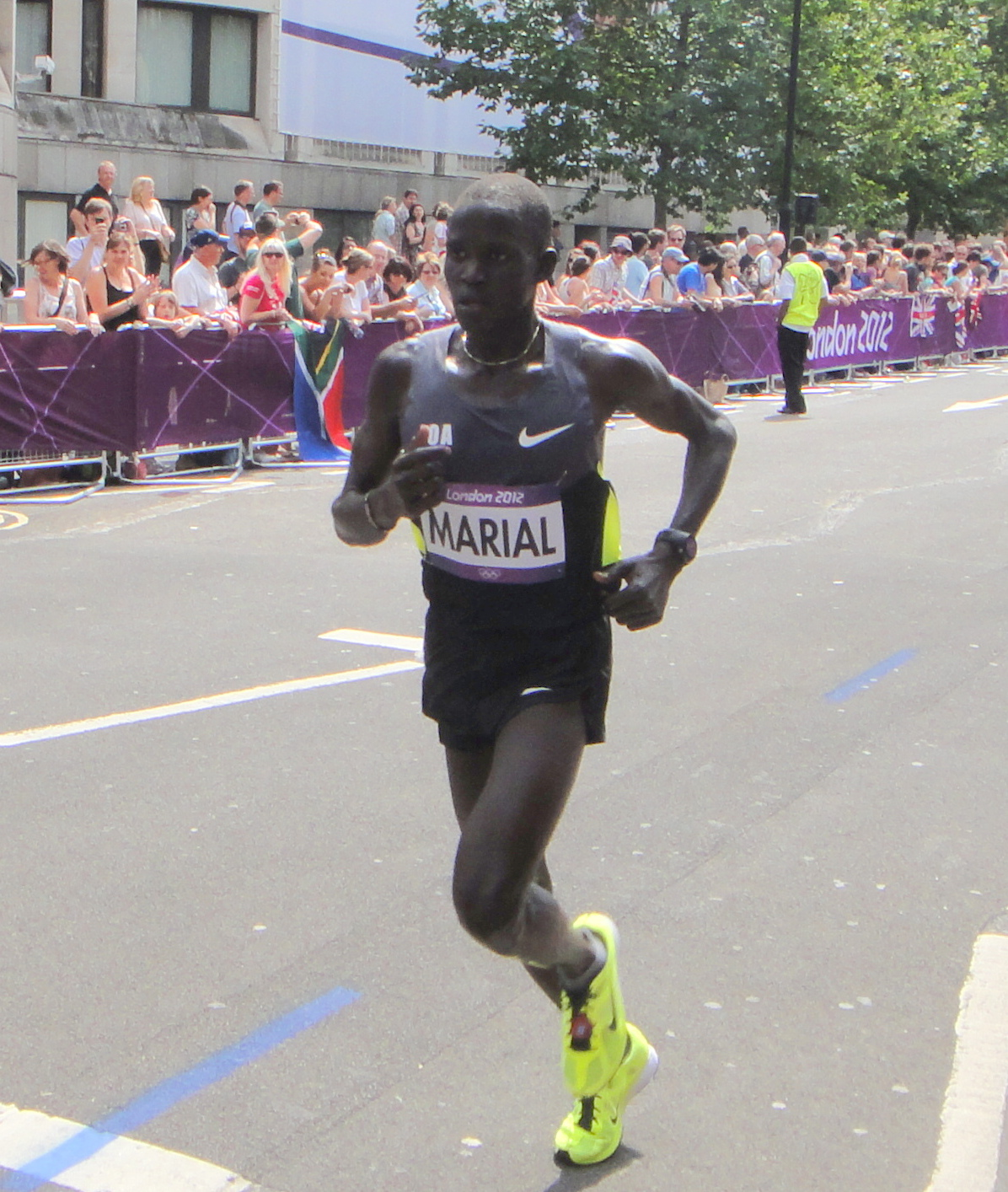
Guor Marial competing in the men's marathon at the 2012 Summer Olympics.

South Sudan gained its independence from Sudan in 2011, but the South Sudanese Civil War made it difficult for the nation to garner the support of five sport federations as required for its National Olympic Committee to gain recognition by the International Olympic Committee. Guor Marial, a South Sudanese refugee living in the United States, competed in the men's marathon at the 2012 Summer Olympics, but did so as an Independent Olympic Athlete after refusing to compete for Sudan. South Sudan became the 206th IOC member in August 2015, with the affiliations of track and field, basketball, association football, handball, judo, table tennis, and taekwondo. The nation chose Marial at its flagbearer for both the opening and closing ceremonies.

In addition to South Sudan's official team, five delegates of the ten-member Refugee Olympic Team, James Chiengjiek, Yiech Biel, Paulo Amotun, Rose Lokonyen, and Anjelina Lohalith, were of South Sudanese origin. All were residents of the Kakuma Refugee Camp in Kenya, who had settled there following violent conflicts in their homeland. Lokonyen served as the team's flagbearer in the opening ceremony.

== Athletics (track and field) ==
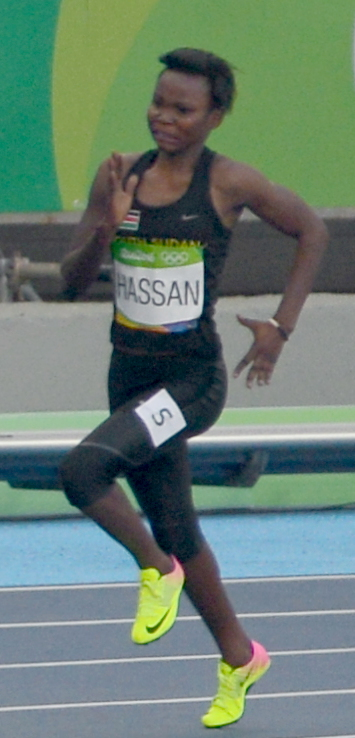
Margret Hassan competing in the women's 200 m at the 2016 Summer Olympics.

No South Sudanese athletes met the Olympic qualifying standards, but the nation was allotted three universality places to compete in track and field events. The South Sudan Athletics Federation nominated Marial, Santino Kenyi, and Mangar Makur Chuot to fill these spots. Eight days prior to the start of the Games, however, the South Sudan National Olympic Committee informed Chuot, who had already been accredited, by email that he had been removed from the team. Chuot was a refugee who had fled the Second Sudanese Civil War after the death of his father and been resettled in Australia in 2008. In 2014 he became the Australian 200 metre champion, but elected to compete for South Sudan rather than Australia at the Games. After his selection for the South Sudanese delegation was confirmed in December 2015, he returned to the country of his birth and became the 2016 South Sudanese 100 and 200 m champion, setting a national record in the latter discipline. The NOC chose Margret Hassan, a competitor in the 200 m event, to take his spot, despite another athlete, national record holder Viola Lado, having posted a better time in the lead up to the Olympics. When the Athletics Federation protested, the NOC claimed that Samsung, who had featured Hassan in one of their advertisements, had pressured the organization to give her one of the spots, an accusation that Samsung denied. When his appeal to the Court of Arbitration for Sport was rejected, Chuot proclaimed his decision to leave the sport.

=== Results ===
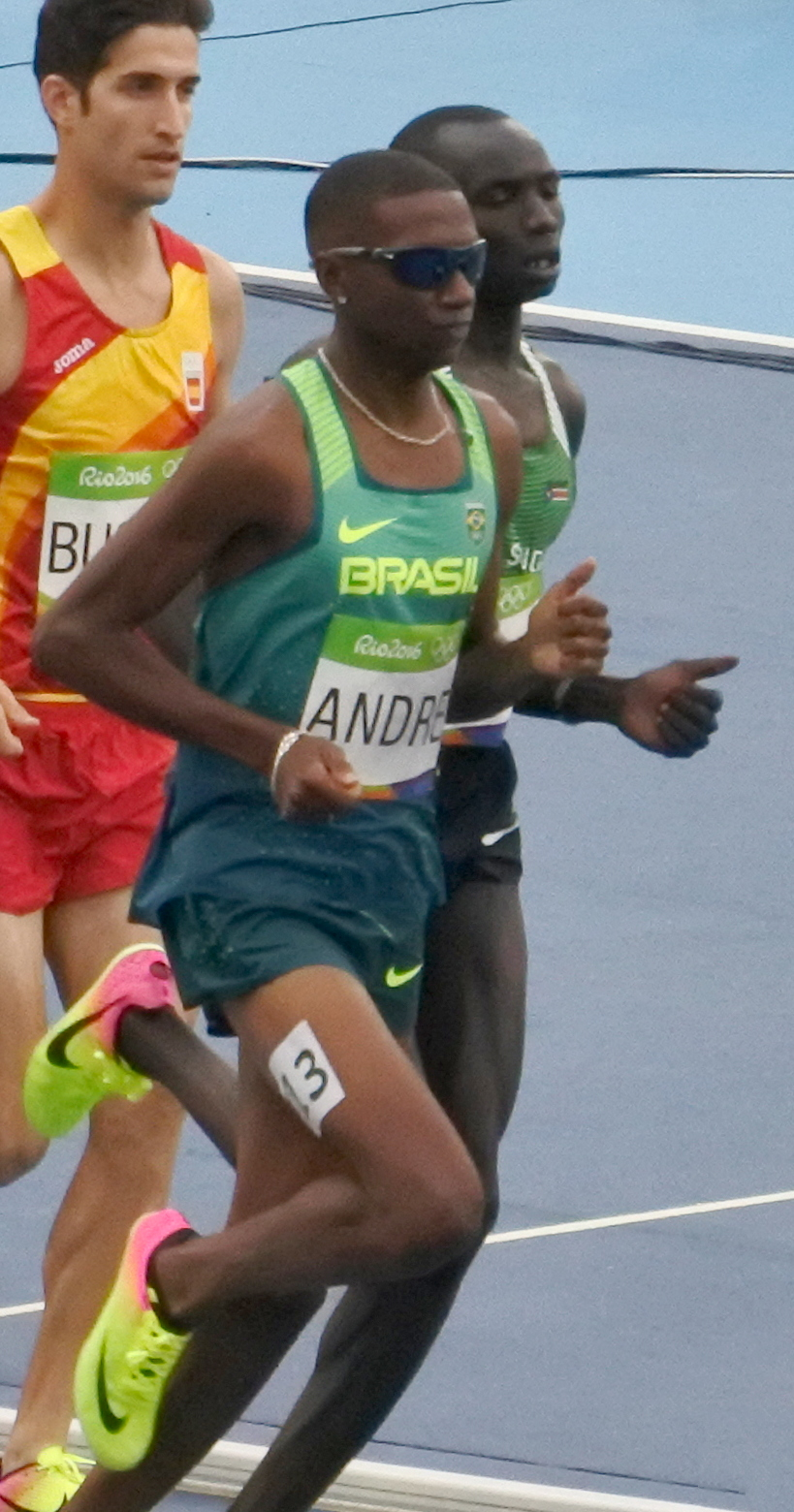
Santino Kenyi (back right) competing in the men's 1500 m at the 2016 Summer Olympics.

Hassan was originally interested in association football before deciding to take up track and field athletics. Despite a lack of training opportunities and facilities, she was given the opportunity to participate in the 2014 Summer Youth Olympics but, since South Sudan was not yet a member of the International Olympic Committee, she competed as an Individual Olympic Athlete. She took part in the 400 m, but did not win a medal. She also attended the 2016 African Championships in Athletics, where she was eliminated in the heats of the 200 m event. For the 2016 Summer Games, she was again entered in the women's 200 m, where she was placed in heat four. This heat contained eventual gold medal-winner Elaine Thompson of Jamaica, although it was won by the Ivory Coast's Marie-Josée Ta Lou. Hassan finished eighth and last, although she set a new personal best of 26.99.

Kenyi took up middle-distance running in 2012 and was a specialist in the 800 and 1500 metre distances. He delayed his final year of high school in order to train for the Olympics. He was selected to represent South Sudan in the men's 1500 m and was placed in heat one, which included Matthew Centrowitz Jr. of the United States, the eventual gold medalist. Kenyi's heat was won by 2008 Olympic Champion Asbel Kiprop of Kenya, while Kenyi himself finished 12th among 14 runners and did not advance.

Marial, who competed in the men's marathon, was the only Olympic veteran among the three. He had fled the Second Sudanese Civil War in 1999 and settled in the United States in 2001, where he took up athletics in high school. He ran for Iowa State University during his college career and was selected as a member of the All-American team. At the 2012 Summer Olympics, he had finished 47th in a field of 105 competitors. He was slated to make South Sudan's debut at the 2015 World Championships in Athletics, but failed to appear for the event. In Rio, he finished 82nd in a field of 155 competitors with a season-best time of 2:22.45.

Key

- Note – Ranks given for track events are within the athlete's heat only
- PB = Personal best
- N/A = Round not applicable for the event

Track & road events

Athlete	Event	Heat		Semifinal		Final	
Athlete	Event	Result	Rank	Result	Rank	Result	Rank
Santino Kenyi	Men's 1500 m	3:45.27	12	did not advance			
Guor Marial	Men's marathon	—N/a				2:22:45	82
Margret Hassan	Women's 200 m	26.99 PB	8	did not advance			
