= List of flag bearers for South Sudan at the Olympics =

South Sudan at the Olympics
- IOC code: SSD
- NOC: South Sudan National Olympic Committee
- Medals: Gold 0 Silver 0 Bronze 0 Total 0

Summer appearances
- 2016; 2020; 2024

Other related appearances
- Sudan (1960–pres.); Independent Olympic Athletes (2012)

This is a list of flag bearers who have represented South Sudan at the Olympics.

Flag bearers carry the national flag of their country at the opening ceremony of the Olympic Games.

#	Event year	Season	Flag bearer	Sex	Sport
1	2016	Summer	Guor Marial	M	Athletics
2	2020	Summer	Abraham Guem	M	Athletics
2	2020	Summer	Lucia Moris	F	Athletics
3	2024	Summer	Kuany Kuany	M	Basketball
3	2024	Summer	Lucia Moris	F	Athletics

== See also ==
- South Sudan at the Olympics
