= South Sudan at the 2024 Summer Olympics =

- IOC code: SSD
- NOC: South Sudan National Olympic Committee

in Paris, France 26 July 2024 – 11 August 2024
- Competitors: 14 (13 men and 1 woman) in 2 sports
- Flag bearers (opening): Kuany Kuany & Lucia Moris
- Flag bearer (closing): Abraham Guem
- Medals: Gold 0 Silver 0 Bronze 0 Total 0

Summer Olympics appearances (overview)
- 2016; 2020; 2024

Other related appearances
- Sudan (1960–pres.); Independent Olympic Athletes (2012)

South Sudan competed at the 2024 Summer Olympics in Paris from 26 July to 11 August 2024. This was the nation's third appearance at the Summer Olympics, since its debut in 2016. The delegation consisted of 14 athletes: Abraham Guem and Lucia Moris in athletics, and a team of 12 basketball players. The South Sudan National Olympic Committee was formed and recognised by the IOC in 2015.

South Sudan did not win any medals during the Paris Olympics. Kuany Kuany and Moris were the flagbearers in the opening ceremony, and Guem was the flagbearer at the closing ceremony.

== Background ==
South Sudan gained its independence from Sudan in 2011, but the South Sudanese Civil War made it difficult for the nation to garner the support of five sport federations as required for its National Olympic Committee to gain recognition by the International Olympic Committee. Guor Marial, a South Sudanese refugee living in the United States, competed in the men's marathon at the 2012 Summer Olympics, but did so as an Independent Olympic Athlete after refusing to compete for Sudan. South Sudan became the 206th IOC member in August 2015, with the affiliations of track and field, basketball, association football, handball, judo, table tennis, and taekwondo.

The 2024 Summer Olympics were held from 26 July to 11 August 2024 in Paris, France. South Sudan sent a delegation of 14 athletes. Kuany Kuany and Lucia Moris served as the team's flagbearers in the 2024 opening ceremony, while Abraham Guem was the sole flagbearer in the closing ceremony.

== Competitors ==
The following is the list of number of competitors in the Games.

Sport	Men	Women	Total
Athletics	1	1	2
Basketball	12	0	12
Total	13	1	14

== Athletics ==
South Sudan was represented by one male and one female athlete at the 2024 Summer Olympics in athletics: Guem in the men's 800 metres run and Moris in the women's 100 metres run. Both qualified via universality place. (Note: Universality places are places awarded to countries that send small delegations to the Olympics. They let the nations' best athlete qualify for the Olympics.) This was Guem's second appearance at the Olympics. On 7 August, he participated in the heats of the men's 800 metre race in heat one. He finished the race in 1:48.74 seconds, last out of nine competitors in his heat, and failed to advanced to the semi-finals, however he did qualify for the repechage round. In the repechage round, which took place on 8 August, Guem was put into heat four. He finished the race with a time of 1:49.45 seconds, eighth out of nine athletes in his heat, and failed to advance to the semifinals. The gold medal was eventually won in 1:41.19 seconds by Emmanuel Wanyonyi of Kenya; the silver was won by Marco Arop of Canada, and the bronze was earned by Djamel Sedjati of Algeria.

Moris also made her second appearance at this Olympics. On 2 August, she participated in the preliminaries of the women's 100 metres race in heat one. She did not finish the race, and failed to advance to the first round. The gold medal was won in 10.72 seconds by Julien Alfred of Saint Lucia, the silver by Sha'Carri Richardson of America, and the bronze by Melissa Jefferson of America.

Key

- Note–Ranks given for track events are within the athlete's heat only
- Q = Qualified for the next round
- q = Qualified for the next round as a fastest loser or, in field events, by position without achieving the qualifying target
- NR = National record
- N/A = Round not applicable for the event
- Bye = Athlete not required to compete in round
- DNF = Did not finish

Track events

Athlete	Event	Heat/Preliminaries		Repechage/Round 1		Semifinal		Final	
Athlete	Event	Result	Rank	Result	Rank	Result	Rank	Result	Rank
Abraham Guem	Men's 800 m	1:48.74	9	1:49.45	8	Did not advance			
Lucia Moris	Women's 100 m	DNF		Did not advance					

== Basketball ==
=== 5×5 basketball ===
The South Sudan men's national basketball team qualified for the men's basketball tournament by being the highest rank from the African zone in 2023 FIBA Basketball World Cup. It was the first time that the nation had qualified for an Olympic basketball competition. In the group stage they defeated Puerto Rico, 90–79 on 28 July, lost to the USA, 86–103 on 31 July, and lost again to Serbia, 85–96 on 3 August. They failed to advance to the quarterfinals. The tournament was won by the USA after beating France in the finals, 98–87.

Summary

Team	Event	Group stage				Quarterfinal	Semifinal	Final / BM	
Team	Event	Opposition Score	Opposition Score	Opposition Score	Rank	Opposition Score	Opposition Score	Opposition Score	Rank
South Sudan men's	Men's tournament	Puerto Rico; W 90–79	United States; L 86–103	Serbia; L 85–96	3	Did not advance			9

Team roster

A 50-player roster was announced on 30 April 2024. It was cut to 25 players on 3 June 2024. The roster was announced on 24 July 2024.

South Sudan men's national basketball team – 2024 Olympics roster
Players
Coaches

Pos.	No.	Name	Age – Date of birth	Height	Club	Ctr.
PG	4	Carlik Jones	26 – 23 December 1997	1.83 m (6 ft 0 in)	Partizan	(Serbia)
F	5	Nuni Omot	29 – 3 October 1994	2.06 m (6 ft 9 in)	Ningbo Rockets	(China)
C	6	Khaman Maluach	17 – 14 September 2006	2.16 m (7 ft 1 in)	Duke Blue Devils	(United States)
SF	7	Bul Kuol	27 – 10 January 1997	2.04 m (6 ft 8 in)	Sydney Kings	(Australia)
SF	8	Kuany Kuany (C)	30 – 8 July 1994	2.01 m (6 ft 7 in)	Free agent
F/C	9	Wenyen Gabriel	27 – 26 March 1997	2.06 m (6 ft 9 in)	Maccabi Tel Aviv	(Israel)
PF	10	JT Thor	21 – 26 August 2002	2.10 m (6 ft 11 in)	Charlotte Hornets	(United States)
SG	11	Marial Shayok	29 – 26 July 1995	1.98 m (6 ft 6 in)	Shandong Hi-Speed Kirin	(China)
PG	12	Jackson Makoi	24 – 3 July 2000	1.93 m (6 ft 4 in)	Cairns Taipans	(Australia)
PF	13	Majok Deng	31 – 1 March 1993	2.05 m (6 ft 9 in)	Tasmania JackJumpers	(Australia)
SG	14	Peter Jok	30 – 30 March 1994	1.98 m (6 ft 6 in)	Ottawa BlackJacks	(Canada)
G	15	Sunday Dech	30 – 1 January 1994	1.95 m (6 ft 5 in)	East Perth Eagles	(Australia)

Head coach

- (United States) Royal Ivey

Assistant coach(es)

- (South Sudan) / (United Kingdom) Luol Deng
- (Nigeria) Fortune Solomon

Legend

- (C) Team captain
- Club – describes last
  club before the tournament
- Age – describes age
  on 27 July 2024

Group play

Pos	Team	Pld	W	L	PF	PA	PD	Pts	Qualification
1	United States	3	3	0	317	253	+64	6	Quarterfinals
2	Serbia	3	2	1	287	261	+26	5	Quarterfinals
3	South Sudan	3	1	2	261	278	−17	4	
4	Puerto Rico	3	0	3	228	301	−73	3	

Source: FIBA
Rules for classification: 1) classification points; 2) head-to-head results; 3) head-to-head game points difference; 4) head-to-head number of game points scored.

28 July 2024
11:00

Boxscore

South Sudan	90–79	Puerto Rico
Scoring by quarter: 20–28, 28–26, 23–15, 19–10
Pts: Jones 19; Rebs: Gabriel 9 Asts: Jones 6		Pts: Alvarado 26; Rebs: Conditt IV, Romero 6 Asts: Alvarado 5

Stade Pierre-Mauroy, Lille
Attendance: 27,021
Referees: Ademir Zurapović (BIH), Takaki Kato (JPN), Martin Vulić (CRO)

31 July 2024
21:00

Boxscore

United States	103–86	South Sudan
Scoring by quarter: 26–14, 29–22, 18–21, 30–29
Pts: Adebayo 18; Rebs: three players 7 Asts: Booker 6		Pts: Omot 24; Rebs: Gabriel 10; Asts: Jones 7

Stade Pierre-Mauroy, Lille
Attendance: 27,056
Referees: Antonio Conde (ESP), Mārtiņš Kozlovskis (LAT), Takaki Kato (JPN)

3 August 2024
21:00

Boxscore

Serbia	96–85	South Sudan
Scoring by quarter: 23–22, 24–22, 25–23, 24–18
Pts: Bogdanović 30; Rebs: Jokić 13; Asts: Bogdanović 8		Pts: Jones, Shayok 17; Rebs: Gabriel 8 Asts: Jones 10

Stade Pierre-Mauroy, Lille
Attendance: 20,916
Referees: Ademir Zurapović (BIH), Yohan Rosso (FRA), Juan Fernández (ARG)
