= South Sudan at the 2020 Summer Olympics =

- IOC code: SSD
- NOC: South Sudan National Olympic Committee

in Tokyo July 23, 2021 – August 8, 2021
- Competitors: 2 in 1 sport
- Flag bearers (opening): Lucia Moris; Abraham Guem
- Flag bearer (closing): Abraham Guem
- Medals: Gold 0 Silver 0 Bronze 0 Total 0

Summer Olympics appearances (overview)
- 2016; 2020; 2024

Other related appearances
- Sudan (1960–); Independent Olympic Athletes (2012)

South Sudan competed at the 2020 Summer Olympics in Tokyo. Originally scheduled for 24 July to 9 August 2020, the Games were postponed because of the COVID-19 pandemic and took place on 23 July to 8 August 2021. After the South Sudan National Olympic Committee's recognition by the International Olympic Committee in 2015, this was the nation's second appearance at the Summer Olympics (after its debut in 2016). The delegation consisted of two athletes: Abraham Guem and Lucia Moris in athletics.

South Sudan did not win any medals during the Paris Olympics. Guem and Moris were the flagbearers in the opening ceremony, and Guem was the flagbearer at the closing ceremony.

== Background ==
South Sudan gained its independence from Sudan in 2011, but the South Sudanese Civil War made it difficult for the nation to garner the support of five sport federations as required for its National Olympic Committee to gain recognition by the International Olympic Committee. Guor Marial, a South Sudanese refugee living in the United States, competed in the men's marathon at the 2012 Summer Olympics, but did so as an Independent Olympic Athlete after refusing to compete for Sudan. South Sudan became the 206th IOC member in August 2015, with the affiliations of track and field, basketball, association football, handball, judo, table tennis, and taekwondo.

The 2020 Summer Olympics were originally scheduled to take place from 24 July to 9 August 2020. The Games were postponed to 23 July to 8 August 2021 because of the COVID-19 pandemic. South Sudan sent a delegation of two athletes. Abraham Guem and Lucia Moris served as the team's flagbearers in the opening ceremony, while Abraham Guem was the sole flagbearer in the closing ceremony.

== Competitors ==
The following is the list of number of competitors in the Games.

Sport	Men	Women	Total
Athletics	1	1	2
Total	1	1	2

== Athletics ==
South Sudan was represented by one male and one female athlete at the 2024 Summer Olympics in athletics: Guem in the men's 1500 metres run and Moris in the women's 200 metres run. Both qualified via universality place. (Note: Universality places are places awarded to countries that send small delegations to the Olympics. They let the nation's best athlete qualify for the Olympics.) This was Guem's debut appearance at the Olympics. He participated in the heats of the men's 1500 metres race in heat one. He finished the race in 3:40.86, 13th out of 16 competitors in his heat, and failed to advanced to the semifinals. The gold medal was eventually won in 3:28.32 seconds by Jakob Ingebrigtsen of Norway, the silver by Timothy Cheruiyot of Kenya, and the bronze by Josh Kerr of Great Britain.

Moris debuted at this Olympics. She participated in round 1 of the women's 200 metres race in heat two. She finished the race in 25.24 seconds, sixth out of seven in her heat, and failed to advance to the semifinals. The gold medal was won in 21.53 seconds by Elaine Thompson-Herah of Jamaica, the silver by Christine Mboma of Namibia, and the bronze by Gabrielle Thomas of America.

Key

- Note–Ranks given for track events are within the athlete's heat only
- NR = National record
- PB = Personal Best

Track & road events

Athlete	Event	Heat		Semifinal		Final	
Athlete	Event	Result	Rank	Result	Rank	Result	Rank
Abraham Guem	Men's 1500 m	3:40.86 PB	13	Did not advance			
Lucia Moris	Women's 200 m	25.24	6	Did not advance			
