= Sudan at the 1992 Summer Olympics =

- IOC code: SUD
- NOC: Sudan Olympic Committee

in Barcelona
- Competitors: 6 men in 3 sports
- Flag bearer: Mahmoud Musa Abdalla
- Medals: Gold 0 Silver 0 Bronze 0 Total 0

Summer Olympics appearances (overview)
- 1960; 1964; 1968; 1972; 1976–1980; 1984; 1988; 1992; 1996; 2000; 2004; 2008; 2012; 2016; 2020; 2024

Other related appearances
- South Sudan (2016–)

Sudan was represented at the 1992 Summer Olympics in Barcelona, Catalonia, Spain by the Sudan Olympic Committee.

In total, six athletes – all men – represented Sudan in three different sports including athletics, judo and weightlifting.

== Competitors ==
In total, six athletes represented Sudan at the 1992 Summer Olympics in Barcelona, Catalonia, Spain across three different sports.

Sport	Men	Women	Total
Athletics	3	0	3
Judo	2	0	2
Weightlifting	1	–	1
Total	6	0	6

== Athletics ==
In total, three Sudanese athletes participated in the athletics events – Stephen Lugor in the men's 400 m, Khalid Mosa in the men's long jump and Adam Hassan Sakak in the men's 100 m and the men's 200 m.

The heats for the men's 100 m took place on 31 July 1992. Hassan Sakak finished seventh in his heat in a time of 11.12 seconds and he did not advance to the quarter-finals.

The heats for the men's 400 m took place on 1 August 1992. Lugor finished eighth in his heat in a time of 48.94 seconds and he did not advance to the quarter-finals.

The heats for the men's 200 m took place on 3 August 1992. Hassan Sakak finished fifth in his heat in a time of 21.96 seconds and he did not advance to the quarter-finals.

Athlete	Event	Heat		Quarterfinal		Semifinal		Final	
Athlete	Event	Result	Rank	Result	Rank	Result	Rank	Result	Rank
Adam Hassan Sakak	100 m	11.12	7	did not advance					
Adam Hassan Sakak	200 m	21.96	5	did not advance					
Stephen Lugor	400 m	48.94	8	did not advance					

The qualifying round for the men's long jump took place on 5 August 1992. Mosa contested qualifying group A. His best jump of 7.03 m was not enough to advance to the final and he finished 42nd overall.

Athlete	Event	Qualification		Final	
Athlete	Event	Distance	Position	Distance	Position
Khalid Mosa	Long jump	7.03	42	did not advance	

== Judo ==
In total, two Sudanese athletes participated in the judo events – Hamid Fadul in the men's −78 kg category and Awad Mahmoud in the men's −71 kg category.

The men's −78 kg category took place on 30 July 1992. In the first round, Fadul lost by ippon to Hidehiko Yoshida of Japan.

The men's −71 kg category took place on 31 July 1992. In the first round, Mahmoud lost by ippon to Meziane Dahmani of Algeria.

Athlete	Event	Preliminary	Round of 32	Round of 16	Quarterfinals	Semifinals	Repechage 1	Repechage 2	Repechage 3	Final / BM	
Athlete	Event	Opposition Result	Opposition Result	Opposition Result	Opposition Result	Opposition Result	Opposition Result	Opposition Result	Opposition Result	Opposition Result	Rank
Awad Mahmoud	−71 kg	Meziane Dahmani (ALG); L 0000–1000	did not advance								
Hamid Fadul	−78 kg	Hidehiko Yoshida (JPN); L 0000–1000	did not advance								

== Weightlifting ==
In total, one Sudanese athlete participated in the weightlifting events – Mubarak Fadl El-Moula in the –75 kg category.

The −75 kg took place on 30 July 1992. El-Moula lifted 90 kg in the snatch but did not compete in the clean and jerk.

Athlete	Event	Snatch		Clean & Jerk		Total	Rank
Athlete	Event	Result	Rank	Result	Rank	Total	Rank
Mubarak Fadl El-Moula	–75 kg	90.0	32	0	DNF	90.0	AC
