= List of South Sudanese records in athletics =

The following are the national records in athletics in South Sudan maintained by its national athletics federation: South Sudan Athletics Federation.

== Outdoor ==
Key to tables: Awaiting ratification Record not kept by South Sudan Athletics Federation

# = not recognised by IAAF

=== Men ===
Event	Record	Athlete	Date	Meet	Place	Ref.
100 m	10.40 A (+0.5 m/s)	Malek Thiep Deng	9 April 2026	Trials For World Athletics Relay Championships	Lang'ata, Kenya	
100 m	10.40 A (+0.6 m/s)	Malek Thiep Deng	22 May 2026	Trials World Athletics U20 Championships	Nairobi, Kenya	
200 m	20.61 A (−0.5 m/s)	Malek Thiep Deng	9 April 2026	Trials For World Athletics Relay Championships	Lang'ata, Kenya	
400 m	45.27	Stephen Dinho Mallual	5 July 2025	BMW L. Louyet Meeting	Huizingen, Belgium	
800 m	1:47.43	Alexander Lomong	13 May 2018		Bloomington, United States	
800 m	1:47.41	Abraham Guem	27 July 2024	On Track Nights:MDC 2024	Tokyo, Japan	
1500 m	3:35.22	Dominic Lokinyomo Lobalu (Note: South Sudanese until 7 September 2023 – eligible to represent Switzerland in National Representative Competitions from 10 May 2024)	4 September 2023	Galà dei Castelli	Bellinzona, Switzerland	
Mile	4:08.84	Dey Tuach Dey	28 April 2018		Des Moines, United States	
2000 m	5:12.20	Dominic Lokinyomo Lobalu (Note: South Sudanese until 7 September 2023 – eligible to represent Switzerland in National Representative Competitions from 10 May 2024)	24 July 2022		Bern, Switzerland	
3000 m	7:49.31	Dominic Lokinyomo Lobalu (Note: South Sudanese until 7 September 2023 – eligible to represent Switzerland in National Representative Competitions from 10 May 2024)	29 May 2021		Meilen, Switzerland	
3000 m	7:29.48	Dominic Lokinyomo Lobalu (Note: South Sudanese until 7 September 2023 – eligible to represent Switzerland in National Representative Competitions from 10 May 2024)	30 June 2022	BAUHAUS-galan	Stockholm, Sweden	
5000 m	12:52.15	Dominic Lokinyomo Lobalu (Note: South Sudanese until 7 September 2023 – eligible to represent Switzerland in National Representative Competitions from 10 May 2024)	2 September 2022	Memorial Van Damme	Brussels, Belgium	
5 km (road)	13:00	Dominic Lokinyomo Lobalu (Note: South Sudanese until 7 September 2023 – eligible to represent Switzerland in National Representative Competitions from 10 May 2024)	7 September 2022	Weltklasse Zürich	Zurich, Switzerland	
10,000 m	28:32.72	Dominic Lokinyomo Lobalu (Note: South Sudanese until 7 September 2023 – eligible to represent Switzerland in National Representative Competitions from 10 May 2024)	4 June 2021		Uster, Switzerland	
10,000 m	27:58.79	Dominic Lokinyomo Lobalu (Note: South Sudanese until 7 September 2023 – eligible to represent Switzerland in National Representative Competitions from 10 May 2024)	10 June 2022	Swiss 10000m Championships	Uster, Switzerland	
10 km (road)	27:09	Domnic Lokinyomo Lobalu (Note: South Sudanese until 7 September 2023 – eligible to represent Switzerland in National Representative Competitions from 10 May 2024)	15 January 2023	10K Valencia Ibercaja	Valencia, Spain	
Half marathon	59:12	Dominic Lokinyomo Lobalu (Note: South Sudanese until 7 September 2023 – eligible to represent Switzerland in National Representative Competitions from 10 May 2024)	18 September 2022	Copenhagen Half Marathon	Copenhagen, Denmark	
Marathon	2:14:32	Guor Marial	2 October 2011		Saint Paul, United States	
Marathon	2:12:55	Guor Marial (Note: before Marial became eligible for South Sudan)	3 June 2012		San Diego, United States	
110 m hurdles						
400 m hurdles	54.08	Joseph Akoon	26 July 2020		Maebashi, Japan	
400 m hurdles	52.42 (Note: before Chol became eligible for South Sudan)	Gatkuath Chol	17 March 2012		Sydney, Australia	
3000 m steeplechase						
High jump	1.96 m	Makuac Leet	4 May 2019		Warrensburg, United States	
Pole vault						
Long jump	6.74 m NWI	Ayup Khoak Khor	19 March 2022	Ugandan Trials	Kampala, Uganda	
Triple jump	16.67 m (+1.0 m/s)	Dawoud Jok	19 June 2026	Doha Diamond League	Doha, Qatar	
Shot put						
Discus throw						
Hammer throw						
Javelin throw	60.55 m A	Atem Deng Alier	13 September 2019		Nairobi, Kenya	
Decathlon						
Decathlon	100m / Long jump / Shot put / High jump / 400m / 110m H / Discus / Pole vault / Javelin / 1500m					
20 km walk (road)						
50 km walk (road)						
4 × 100 m relay	46.4 h	South Sudan	24 August 2017		Gulu, Uganda	
4 × 400 m relay	3:22.50 (Note: by World Athletics, 3:22.56 by official result source)	South Sudan; Mangar Chuot; G. Chol; Santino Kenyi; S. Ukele	26 June 2016	African Championships	Durban, South Africa	

=== Women ===
Event	Record	Athlete	Date	Meet	Place	Ref.
100 m	11.77 (−0.2 m/s)	Lucia Moris	11 April 2026	Trials For World Athletics Relay Championships	Lang'ata, Kenya	
100 m	11.77 (−1.3 m/s)	Lucia Moris	12 May 2026	African Championships	Accra, Ghana	
200 m	23.90 A (+1.2 m/s)	Lucia Moris	11 April 2026	Trials For World Athletics Relay Championships	Lang'ata, Kenya	
400 m	1:01.19 A	Rose Ihisa Uwaro	28 May 2021		Nairobi, Kenya	
800 m	2:11.87	Rose Lokonyen	30 July 2021	Olympic Games	Tokyo, Japan	
1500 m	4:31.65	Anjelina Lohalith	2 August 2021	Olympic Games	Tokyo, Japan	
1500 m	4:23.84	Anjelina Lohalith	15 July 2022	World Championships	Eugene, United States	
2000 m	6:14.79	Cecelia Thalang Juli Ajieth	13 January 2025	Open Meet Tel-Aviv 2	Tel Aviv, Israel	
3000 m	12:21.2 h	Flora Ayen Paul	4 April 2019		Butare, Rwanda	
5000 m	16:34.66 A	Elizabeth Namura	14 March 2026	1st National Trial	Kampala, Uganda	
10,000 m	37:55.31	Falicia Oyo	25 June 2016	African Championships	Durban, South Africa	
10,000 m	33:47.49	Cecelia Thalang Juli Ajieth	27 March 2025	Israeli 10,000m Championships	Tel Aviv, Israel	
10 km (road)	32:06	Elizabeth Namura	18 April 2026	10 km en Ruta Villa de Laredo	Laredo, Spain	
Half marathon	1:11:17	Stella Mami Clement Lokhiri	19 April 2026	Istanbul Half Marathon	Istanbul, Turkey	
Marathon	2:33:22	Atalena Loliha	31 May 2025	Stockholm Marathon	Stockholm, Sweden	
100 m hurdles	13.97 (+2.0 m/s)	Esaba Okwaramoi (Note: double citizenship unclear, US American by World Athletics source)	26 April 2024	Drake Relays	Des Moines, United States	
400 m hurdles						
3000 m steeplechase						
High jump	1.67 m	Nyakat Ezbon	24 March 2018		Canyon, United States	
High jump	1.67 m	Nyakat Ezbon	23 March 2019		Canyon, United States	
Pole vault						
Long jump	5.74 m (±0.0 m/s)	Nyakume Dup	28 April 2018		Winona, United States	
Triple jump	11.83 m (−2.0 m/s)	Nyakume Dup	17 May 2018		La Crosse, United States	
Shot put	8.99 m	Nyajok Tole	27 December 2021		Aweil, South Sudan	
Discus throw	28.25 m	Juan Noel Zakaria	24/25 August 2017		Gulu, Uganda	
Hammer throw						
Javelin throw	28.41 m	Chajen Dang Yien	4 August 2018		Asaba, Nigeria	
Heptathlon						
Heptathlon	100m H / High jump / Shot put / 200m / Long jump / Javelin / 800m					
20 km walk (road)						
4 × 100 m relay	60.4 h	South Sudan; J. D. Clement ?	24 August 2017		Gulu, Uganda	
4 × 400 m relay	4:18.2 h	South Sudan; M. N. Augusto ?	25 August 2017		Gulu, Uganda	

== Indoor ==
=== Men ===
Event	Record	Athlete	Date	Meet	Place	Ref.
60 m						
200 m						
300 m	33.32	Semi Thiel Deng Thiel	10 January 2026	Halowy mityng Dolnośląskiego Związku Lekkiej Atletyki	Wrocław, Poland	
400 m	47.12	Semi Thiel Deng Thiel	18 January 2026	Ogólnopolski mityng lekkoaltetyczny MKL Toruń	Toruń, Poland	
800 m	1:49.23	Alex Lomong	29 January 2022	Razorback Invitational	Fayetteville, United States	
800 m	1:48.52	Alex Lomong	18 February 2022	Arkansas Qualifier	Fayetteville, United States	
800 m	1:48.17 OT	Alex Lomong	26 February 2022	Big 12 Championships	Ames, United States	
800 m	1:48.08	Dey Tuach Dey	11 February 2011	Tyson Invitational	Fayetteville, United States	
1000 m	2:21.75	Alexander Lomong	3 December 2021	Wooo Pig Classic	Fayetteville, United States	
1500 m	3:48.82	Abraham Guem	19 March 2022	World Championships	Belgrade, Serbia	
Mile	4:04.89	Santino Kenyi	6 March 2020	NJCAA Championships	Lynchburg, United States	
3000 m	7:50.59	Domnic Lokinyomo Lobalu (Note: South Sudanese until 7 September 2023 – eligible to represent Switzerland in National Representative Competitions from 10 May 2024)	19 February 2023	Swiss Championships	St. Gallen, Switzerland	
5000 m	14:30.10	Santino Kenyi	2 February 2020	Frank Sevigne Husker Invitational	Lincoln, United States	
5000 m	14:11.09 (Note: before Marial became eligible for South Sudan)	Guor Marial	28 February 2009		College Station, United States	
60 m hurdles						
High jump	2.01 m	Makuac Leet	8 December 2018	Mel Tjeerdsma Classic	Maryville, Missouri	
Pole vault						
Long jump						
Triple jump						
Shot put						
Heptathlon						
Heptathlon	60m / Long jump / Shot put / High jump / 60m H / Pole vault / 1000m					
5000 m walk						
4 × 400 m relay						

=== Women ===
Event	Record	Athlete	Date	Meet	Place	Ref.
60 m						
200 m						
400 m						
800 m						
1500 m						
3000 m						
60 m hurdles	8.58	Esaba Okwaramoi (Note: double citizenship unclear, US American by World Athletics source)	24 February 2024	NSIC Championships	Mankato, United States	
High jump						
Pole vault						
Long jump	5.53 m	Nyakume Dup	11 February 2017	Yellow Jacket Open	Wisconsin, United States	
Triple jump						
Shot put						
Pentathlon						
Pentathlon	60m H / High jump / Shot put / Long jump / 800m					
3000 m walk						
4 × 400 m relay						
