= Sudan at the 1972 Summer Olympics =

- IOC code: SUD
- NOC: Sudan Olympic Committee

in Munich
- Competitors: 26 in 4 sports
- Flag bearer: Abdel Wahab Abdullah Salih
- Medals: Gold 0 Silver 0 Bronze 0 Total 0

Summer Olympics appearances (overview)
- 1960; 1964; 1968; 1972; 1976–1980; 1984; 1988; 1992; 1996; 2000; 2004; 2008; 2012; 2016; 2020; 2024

Other related appearances
- South Sudan (2016–)

Sudan competed at the 1972 Summer Olympics in Munich, West Germany.

== Athletics ==
Men
Track & road events

Athlete	Event	Heat		Quarterfinal		Semifinal		Final	
Athlete	Event	Result	Rank	Result	Rank	Result	Rank	Result	Rank
Ibrahim Saad Abdel Galil	200 m	22.41	6	did not advance					
Moreldin Mohamed Hamdi	110 m hurdles	15.80	7	did not advance					
Angelo Hussein	400 m	47.01	3 Q	47.33	8	did not advance			
Angelo Hussein	800 m	1:48.9	3 Q	—		1:51.1	8	did not advance	
Shaq Musa Medani	10,000 m	29:32.8	13	did not advance					
Shaq Musa Medani	Marathon	—						DNF	
Dafallah Sultan Farah	1500 m	4:02.9	10	did not advance					
Mohamed Musa Gadou; Dafallah Sultan Farah; Ibrahim Saad Abdel Galil; Angelo Hussein	4 × 400 m	3:14.5	21	did not advance					

Alternate members:

- Mashinkok Izielia Alier
- Mohamed Mahagoub Said
- Taha Kamal Eldin Mohamed

== Boxing ==
Men

Athlete	Event	1 Round	2 Round	3 Round	Quarterfinals	Semifinals	Final
Athlete	Event	Opposition Result	Opposition Result	Opposition Result	Opposition Result	Opposition Result	Rank
Abaker Saed Mohamed otherwise Mohamed Abakkar	Flyweight	BYE	Neil McLaughlin (IRL); L 0-5	did not advance			
Kasamiro Kashri Marchlo	Lightweight	BYE	Jan Szczepanski (POL); L 0-5	did not advance			
Timsah Milwal Okalo	Light-Welterweight	Emiliano Villa (COL); L 0-5	did not advance				
Mirgaani Gomaa Rizgalla	Welterweight	BYE	Kerry Devlin (AUS); L TKO-3	did not advance			
Abdalla Abdelwahb Salih	Middleweight	Hans-Joachim Brauske (GDR); L 2-3	did not advance				

Alternate member:

- Ibrahim Abdalhamid Awad
- Mohame Hashim Ahmed
- Mustafa Awad Abbasher
- Obang Fitter Obang

== Football ==
=== Group B ===
Team	Pld	W	D	L	GF	GA	GD	Pts
Soviet Union	3	3	0	0	7	2	+5	6
Mexico	3	2	0	1	3	4	-1	4
Burma	3	1	0	2	2	2	0	2
Sudan	3	0	0	3	1	5	−4	0

28 August 1972
12:00

Mexico	1 – 0	Sudan
Manzo 16'	Report

Nuremberg
Attendance: 500
Referee: Francesco Francescon (Italy)

30 August 1972
12:00

Soviet Union	2 – 1	Sudan
Yevriuzhikin 42' (pen.); Zanazanyan 44'	Report	Jaxa 59'

Olympic Stadium, Munich
Attendance: 25.000
Referee: Ferdinand Biwersi (West Germany)

1 September 1972
12:00

Burma	2 – 0	Sudan
Soe Than 7'; Aung Moe Thin 61'	Report

Passau
Attendance: 2.000
Referee: Marian Srodecki (Poland)
- Roster – Morgan Abdelgadir Mohmed, Ahmed Abdo Mustafa, Musa Awad Nasr, Sanad Bushara Abdelnadief, Ahmed Bushra Wahba, Addelfadiel Elfadil Osman, Elnur Elnur Abdelgadir, Mohamed Elsir Abdalla, Suliman Gaafar Mohmed, Ali Hasabelrasoul Omer, Mohmed Izzeldin Adam, Ahmed Izzeldin Osman, Salim Mahmoud Said, Mohmed Mohmed Abdelfatah, Ahmed Mohmed Elbashir, Attaelmanan Mohsin, Hassan Nagmeldin, Gaksa Nasreldin Abas, and Mohmed Sharafeldin Ahmed

== Weightlifting ==
Men

Athlete	Event	Military Press		Snatch		Clean & Jerk		Total	Rank
Athlete	Event	Result	Rank	Result	Rank	Result	Rank	Total	Rank
Wanni Samson Sabit	67,5 kg	107.5	14	75.0	22	110.0	21	292.5	20

Alternate member:

- Dein Farouk Ahmed
- Mostafa Mohamed Abdelwahab
- Ramadan Mohamed Elmansour
