= South Sudan Athletics Federation =

Sports governing body in South Sudan

- Sport: Athletics
- Jurisdiction: South Sudan
- Abbreviation: SSAF
- Affiliation: World Athletics
- Affiliation date: 2015
- Regional affiliation: Confederation of African Athletics; Eastern Africa Athletic Region (EAAR)
- Headquarters: Juba, South Sudan
- Secretary: Marco Akol Deng

Official website
- athleticssdaf.com

The South Sudan Athletics Federation (SSAF) is the national governing body for the sport of athletics in South Sudan, covering track and field, cross country running, road running, and racewalking. Headquartered in Juba, it is recognised by World Athletics and holds membership in the Confederation of African Athletics and the Eastern Africa Athletic Region (EAAR). The federation was one of the founding member federations that enabled the South Sudan National Olympic Committee to gain recognition from the International Olympic Committee in 2015.

== History ==
South Sudan became an independent country on 9 July 2011. In the years that followed, the country worked to establish national federations for its main Olympic sports, a process complicated by the South Sudanese Civil War. The SSAF states it was recognised as a member federation of what was then the International Association of Athletics Federations (IAAF, now World Athletics) in 2015.

Representatives of athletics and six other sports federations met in Juba on 8–9 June 2015 for the founding general assembly of the South Sudan National Olympic Committee, electing Lieutenant-General Wilson Deng Kuoirot as its first president. This satisfied the Olympic Charter's requirement of at least five internationally recognised national federations, and on 3 August 2015 the IOC granted the South Sudan NOC full recognition at its 128th Session in Kuala Lumpur, making South Sudan the 206th National Olympic Committee.

Even before formal international recognition, South Sudanese-born distance runners had already competed on the world stage. Guor Marial, a marathon runner originally from what is now Unity State, competed at the 2012 Summer Olympics in London as one of only four Independent Olympic Athletes, having refused to compete under the flag of Sudan.

At the 2016 Summer Olympics in Rio de Janeiro, South Sudan's first official Olympic appearance, the SSAF selected Guor Marial, Santino Kenyi, and Australian-based sprinter Mangar Makur Chuot to fill the country's three universality places in track and field. Days before the Games began, the South Sudan National Olympic Committee removed Chuot from the roster and replaced him with sprinter Margret Rumat Hassan, a decision the SSAF and Chuot's camp opposed and unsuccessfully challenged at the Court of Arbitration for Sport; the switch drew scrutiny after it emerged Hassan had recently appeared in an advertisement for Samsung, an IOC sponsor.

== Structure and affiliation ==
The SSAF operates through a network of affiliate member associations across all ten states of South Sudan, which it describes as central to its mission of identifying and developing athletic talent nationwide. Internationally, the federation is affiliated with:

- World Athletics (since 2015)
- Confederation of African Athletics (CAA)
- Eastern Africa Athletic Region (EAAR)

The federation is also one of the founding member federations of the South Sudan National Olympic Committee.

== National teams and athlete development ==
The SSAF selects South Sudan's representatives at continental and global athletics championships, including the Olympic Games, the World Athletics Championships, and the African Games. Many athletes selected by the federation have trained outside South Sudan; more than twenty South Sudanese athletes prepared for the 2016 Games in Kenya with the Tegla Loroupe Peace Foundation, reflecting the country's limited domestic training infrastructure in the years following independence.

Notable athletes who have represented South Sudan under the SSAF include:

- Guor Marial — marathon runner; competed as an Independent Olympic Athlete in 2012, then represented South Sudan at the 2016 and 2020 Olympics, serving as flag bearer at both
- Santino Kenyi — 1,500 m runner; competed at the 2016 Summer Olympics
- Margret Rumat Hassan — 200 m sprinter; competed at the 2016 Summer Olympics
- Rose Lokonyen (Rose Nathike Lokonyen) — 800 m runner; flag bearer for the Refugee Olympic Team at the 2016 Summer Olympics opening ceremony
- Paulo Lokoro (Paulo Amotun Lokoro) — 1,500 m specialist; competed for the Refugee Olympic Team at the 2016 Summer Olympics, trained by Tegla Loroupe
- Abraham Guem — 1,500 m runner; competed at the 2022 and 2023 World Athletics Championships and the 2020 and 2024 Summer Olympics, serving as flag bearer at the latter two
- Lucia Moris — 200 m sprinter; competed at the 2020 and 2024 Summer Olympics, serving as flag bearer at both
- Atalena Loliha (Atalena Napule Gaspore Loliha) — marathon and half-marathon runner; won South Sudan's first-ever medal at a major multi-sport Games, a gold medal in the women's half marathon at the 2023 African Games, and competed in the marathon at the 2025 World Athletics Championships in Tokyo

== Competition appearances ==
South Sudanese athletes selected by the SSAF have competed at every Summer Olympic Games since the country's Olympic debut in 2016, as well as multiple editions of the World Athletics Championships (2017, 2019, 2022, 2023, and 2025) and the African Games.

Year	Competition	Result
2012	Summer Olympics (London)	Guor Marial competed as an Independent Olympic Athlete (South Sudan not yet IOC-recognised)
2016	Summer Olympics (Rio de Janeiro)	South Sudan's first official Olympic appearance; three athletes entered in track and field
2017	World Championships in Athletics (London)	South Sudan entered one athlete
2019	World Championships in Athletics (Doha)	South Sudan entered one athlete
2020 (held 2021)	Summer Olympics (Tokyo)	Two athletes competed: Abraham Guem and Lucia Moris
2022	World Athletics Championships (Eugene)	Abraham Guem competed in the 1,500 m
2023	World Athletics Championships (Budapest)	Abraham Guem set a personal best of 3:37.85 in the 1,500 m
2023–2024	African Games (Accra)	Atalena Loliha won gold in the women's half marathon — South Sudan's first Games medal
2024	Summer Olympics (Paris)	Two athletes competed; Abraham Guem and Lucia Moris served as flag bearers
2025	World Athletics Championships (Tokyo)	Atalena Loliha competed in the marathon

== See also ==
- Sport in South Sudan
- South Sudan at the Olympics
- South Sudan National Olympic Committee
- South Sudan Basketball Federation
- South Sudan Football Association
