= Sudan at the 2008 Summer Olympics =

- IOC code: SUD
- NOC: Sudan Olympic Committee

in Beijing
- Competitors: 9 in 2 sports
- Flag bearer: Abubaker Kaki
- Medals Ranked 70th: Gold 0 Silver 1 Bronze 0 Total 1

Summer Olympics appearances (overview)
- 1960; 1964; 1968; 1972; 1976–1980; 1984; 1988; 1992; 1996; 2000; 2004; 2008; 2012; 2016; 2020; 2024

Other related appearances
- South Sudan (2016–pres.)

Sudan sent a delegation to compete at the 2008 Summer Olympics in Beijing, China. Nine competitors, all from the Darfur region and northern Sudan, represented Sudan at the Beijing games.

The athletes' transport, training and equipment costs were mostly met by the British embassy in Khartoum, and by British charities.

Sudan obtained one medal at the Beijing Games, when Ismail Ahmed Ismail took silver in the men's 800 metres race in athletics. This was Sudan's first and to date only medal at an Olympic Games.

== Medalists ==
Medal	Name	Sport	Event
Silver	Ismail Ahmed Ismail	Athletics	Men's 800 metres

== Athletics ==
=== Men's competition ===
Nagmeldin Ali Abubakr competed in the Beijing Olympics on Sudan's behalf as a runner. He participated in the men's 400 meters dash. Born in the capital city of Khartoum, Abubakr first competed in the Olympics at the age of 18, when he represented Sudan in the same event at the 2004 Summer Olympics in Athens, Greece. He later competed in Beijing at the age of 22. During the course of the event's qualification round, which took place on August 17, Abubakr was placed in the third heat. He finished last of eight athletes after completing the event in 47.12 seconds, immediately behind Kenya's Vincent Mumo Kiilu (46.79 seconds) and Zimbabwe's Lewis Banda (46.76 seconds). The heat was led by Costa Rica's Nery Brenes (45.36 seconds) and Nigeria's Godday James (45.49 seconds). Overall, 55 athletes finished the event's first round. Abubakr placed 50th, and did not advance to later rounds.

Abdalla Abdelgadir represented Sudan at the Beijing Olympics by participating in the men's 1500 meters race. Born in 1987, Abdelgadir was 21 years old at the time of his participation in Beijing. He had not previously competed at any Olympic Games. During the course of the August 15 event, Abdelgadir competed in the 13-person third heat. He finished the event in 3:46.65, placing last in the heat and ahead of 12th place finalist Bayron Piedra of Ecuador (3:45.57) and 11th place finalist Nicholar Kemboi of Kenya (3:41.56) in a heat led by South Africa's Juan van Deventer (3:36.32) and Spain's Arturo Casado (3:36.42). Of the event's 50 competitors and 48 ranking athletes, Abdelgadir ranked 46th. He did not progress to later rounds.

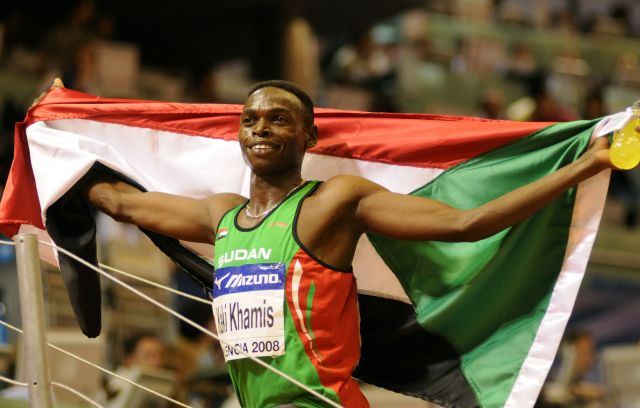
Abubaker Kaki Khamis competed for Sudan in the 800 meters.

Abubaker Kaki Khamis is a runner from the formerly central Sudanese city of El Muglad who represented Sudan at the Beijing Olympics in the men's 800 meters. At the age of 19, Kaki competed in the Olympic Games for the first time during the course of his event. During the event's qualification round, Kaki competed in the second heat against six other athletes. He competed the event in 1:46.98, placing first in the event, placing ahead of Saudi Arabia's Mohammed Obaid A Alsalhi (1:47.02) and Russia's Dmitry Bogdanov (1:47.49). Of the 58 finishing athletes, Kaki ranked 23rd. He advanced to the next round.

Abubaker Kaki Khamis progressed to the three-heat semifinal round, and raced in the third heat against seven other athletes. During this run, he finished the race in 1:49.19 and placed last, immediately behind Uganda's Abraham Chepkirwok (1:49.16) and Great Britain's Michael Rimmer (1:48.07). Of the 24 athletes that advanced to this round, Kaki ranked in 24th place. He did not advance to the final round.

Ismail Ahmed Ismail, a then 23-year-old athlete born in Khartoum, also participated on Sudan's behalf in the men's 800 meters dash during the Beijing Olympics. At age 19, Ismail competed previously in the event while at the 2004 Summer Olympics in Athens, Greece, finishing eighth at the event's finals. During the August 20 qualification round, Ismail competed in the fifth heat against seven other athletes. Of those seven, six others finished. Ismail finished in a time of 1:45.87, placing second behind Spain's Manuel Olmedo (1:45.78) and ahead of Canada's Gary Reed (1:46.02). Overall, 58 people competed in the event and finished; Ismail Ahmed Ismail finished in eighth place, and advanced to the semifinal round.

The semifinal round occurred on August 21, with Ismail competing in the eight-person second heat. He again finished second after completing the race in 1:44.91 ahead of Bahraini athlete Yusuf Saad Kamel (1:44.95) and behind Kenyan Alfred Kirwa Yego (1:44.73). The three athletes respectively placed first, second, and third out of the 24 athletes who advanced to the semifinal round. Ismail advanced to finals on August 23. During this final race, Ismail finished in 1:44.70 and won the silver medal. He placed ahead of bronze medalist Yego (1:44.82) and behind Wilfred Kipkemboi Bungei (1:44.65), another Kenyan athlete. This medal was the first one ever won by any Sudanese athlete at the Olympic Games.

=== Women's competition ===
Malbas Jamous Nawal El-Jack, known more generally as Nawal El Jack, was an athlete who represented Sudan in the women's 400 meters while at the Beijing Olympics. She was born in Khartoum, the Sudanese capital, in October 1988 and was 19 years old at the time of her competitions at the Beijing Olympics. El Jack had not previously competed at any Olympic Games. During the event's qualification round, El Jack competed in the sixth heat against seven other athletes. She finished third in the event with a time of 52.77 seconds, defeating Kineke Alexander of Saint Vincent and the Grenadines (52.87 seconds) but falling behind Great Britain's Nicola Sanders (51.81 seconds). The leader of El Jack's heat was Jamaica's Novlene Williams (51.52 seconds). Of the 50 competing athletes, El Jack ranked 30th. She advanced to the next round.

El Jack competed in the third heat during the semifinal round, facing seven other athletes. During the course of the race, Nawal El Jack finished last with a time of 54.18 seconds; she placed directly behind seventh-place finalist DeeDee Trotter of the United States (51.87 seconds) and sixth-place finalist Folashade Abugan of Nigeria (51.30 seconds) in a heat led by Russia's Yulia Gushchina (50.48 seconds) and Botswana's Amantle Montsho (50.54 seconds). 24 athletes advanced to semifinals; El Jack placed last of them. She did not advance to the final round.

Muna Jabir Adam represented Sudan at the Beijing Olympics by participating in the women's 400 meters hurdles race. Born in Al-Ubayyid, a provincial capital in then-central Sudan, Gabir was 21 years old at the time of participation in the Beijing Olympics. She had not previously competed at any Olympic Games. During the course of the August 17 qualification races, Gabir competed in the fourth heat, which included seven athletes. She finished the race in 57.16 seconds, placing ahead of Trinidad and Tobago's Josanne Lucas (57.76 seconds) and behind Kazakhstan's Tatyana Azarova (56.88 seconds) in a heat led by Russia's Ekaterina Bikert (55.15 seconds) and Poland's Anna Jesień (55.35 seconds). Of the qualification round's 27 participants, Gabir ranked 20th. She did not advance to later rounds.

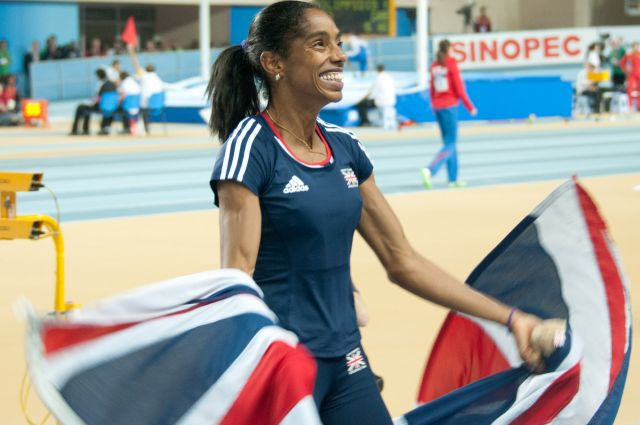
Yamilé Aldama represented Sudan in the triple jump in Beijing.

Muna Kalameya Durka competed for Sudan at the Beijing Olympics in the 3000 meters steeplechase races. Born in 1988, Durka was 20 years old at the time of the Beijing Olympics. She had not previously competed in any Olympic Games. During the course of the August 15 qualification round, Durka competed in the second heat, which included 17 athletes. She finished the obstacle race in 9:53.09, placing ninth between Belgium's tenth place finalist Veerle Dejaeghere (9:54.65) and Ethiopia's eighth place finalist Sofia Assefa Abebe (9:47.02) in a heat led by Russia's Tatiana Petrova (9:28.85) and Ireland's Roisin Mcgettigan (9:28.92). Of the 51 competing athletes and 47 finishing competitors, Muna Kalameya Durka ranked 38th. She did not advance to later rounds.

Yamilé Aldama competed for Sudan at the Beijing Olympics in the women's triple jump. Born in the Cerro neighborhood of Havana, Cuba, the Cuban-British-Sudanese citizen has been affiliated with the Shaftesbury Barnet Harriers sports club in London. She first participated in the Olympics as a 28-year-old at Sydney in 2000, representing Cuba and finishing fourth in the event. In Athens in 2004, Aldama competed for Sudan for the first time as a 31-year-old, finishing fifth. She returned at 35 years of age to the 2008 Olympics. During the August 15 qualifying round, Yamilé Aldama competed in the second heat against 17 other athletes. However, she fouled out on all three attempts, and was one of three athletes who did not rank in her heat (the others were Czech jumper Martina Sestakova and Slovak athlete Dana Veldakova).

=== Summary ===
Key

- Note–Ranks given for track events are within the athlete's heat only
- Q = Qualified for the next round
- q = Qualified for the next round as a fastest loser or, in field events, by position without achieving the qualifying target
- NR = National record
- N/A = Round not applicable for the event
- Bye = Athlete not required to compete in round

Men
Track & road events

Athlete	Event	Heat		Semifinal		Final	
Athlete	Event	Result	Rank	Result	Rank	Result	Rank
Abdalla Abdelgadir	1500 m	3:47.65	13	Did not advance			
Nagmeldin Ali Abubakr	400 m	47.12	8	Did not advance			
Ismail Ahmed Ismail	800 m	1:45.87	2 Q	1:44.91	2 Q	1:44.70	2nd place, silver medalist(s)
Abubaker Kaki	800 m	1:46.98	1 Q	1:49.19	8	Did not advance	

Women
Track & road events

Athlete	Event	Heat		Semifinal		Final	
Athlete	Event	Result	Rank	Result	Rank	Result	Rank
Muna Jabir Adam	400 m hurdles	57.16	5	Did not advance			
Muna Durka	3000 m steeplechase	9:53.09	9	—N/a		Did not advance	
Nawal El Jack	400 m	52.77	3 Q	54.18	8	Did not advance	

Field events

Athlete	Event	Qualification		Final	
Athlete	Event	Distance	Position	Distance	Position
Yamilé Aldama	Triple jump	NM	—	Did not advance	

== Swimming ==
Ahmed Adam represented Sudan at the Beijing Olympics as its only swimmer. He competed in the men's 50 meters freestyle. Born in Sudan in 1987, Adam was 20 years old at the time he competed in the Beijing Olympics. He had not previously participated at any Olympic Games. The preliminary round for his event took place on August 14, where he competed in the fourth heat. Finishing the event in 30.12 seconds, Ahmed placed last of the heat's eight athletes. Uganda's Gilbert Kaburu placed ahead of him at seventh (27.72 seconds), while Nepal's Prasiddha Shah placed ahead of Kaburu at sixth place (27.59 seconds) in a heat led by American Samoa's Stewart Glenister (25.45 seconds) and Palestine's Hamza Abdo (25.60 seconds). Overall, of the 97 participants in the first round, Ahmed placed 93rd. He did not advance to later rounds.

Athlete	Event	Heat		Semifinal		Final	
Athlete	Event	Time	Rank	Time	Rank	Time	Rank
Ahmed Adam	50 m freestyle	30.12	93	Did not advance			
