= Sudan at the 1968 Summer Olympics =

- IOC code: SUD
- NOC: Sudan Olympic Committee

in Mexico City
- Competitors: 5 in 2 sports
- Medals: Gold 0 Silver 0 Bronze 0 Total 0

Summer Olympics appearances (overview)
- 1960; 1964; 1968; 1972; 1976–1980; 1984; 1988; 1992; 1996; 2000; 2004; 2008; 2012; 2016; 2020; 2024

Other related appearances
- South Sudan (2016–)

Sudan competed at the 1968 Summer Olympics in Mexico City, Mexico.

== Athletics ==
Men
Track & road events

Athlete	Event	Heat		Quarterfinal		Semifinal		Final	
Athlete	Event	Result	Rank	Result	Rank	Result	Rank	Result	Rank
Angelo Hussein	400 m	47.80	5	did not advance					
Angelo Hussein	800 m	1:53.4	6	did not advance					
Morgan Gesmalla	100 m	11.09	8	did not advance					
Morgan Gesmalla	200 m	22.70	7	did not advance					

== Boxing ==
Men

Athlete	Event	1 Round	2 Round	3 Round	Quarterfinals	Semifinals	Final
Athlete	Event	Opposition Result	Opposition Result	Opposition Result	Opposition Result	Opposition Result	Rank
Hwad Abdel	Featherweight	Antonio Roldán (MEX); L 5-0	did not advance				
Abdel Sheed	Lightweight	Eugenio Febus (PUR); W 5-0	Pedro Agüero (ARG); L 0-5	did not advance			
Abdalla Abdel	Light-middleweight	Prince Amartey (GHA); L 1-4	did not advance				
