= Sudan at the 1960 Summer Olympics =

- IOC code: SUD
- NOC: Sudan Olympic Committee

in Rome
- Competitors: 10 in 4 sports
- Medals: Gold 0 Silver 0 Bronze 0 Total 0

Summer Olympics appearances (overview)
- 1960; 1964; 1968; 1972; 1976–1980; 1984; 1988; 1992; 1996; 2000; 2004; 2008; 2012; 2016; 2020; 2024

Other related appearances
- South Sudan (2016–)

Sudan competed in the Summer Olympic Games for the first time at the 1960 Summer Olympics in Rome, Italy. Ten competitors, all men, took part in ten events in four sports.

== Athletics ==
Men
Track & road events

Athlete	Event	Heat		Quarterfinal		Semifinal		Final	
Athlete	Event	Result	Rank	Result	Rank	Result	Rank	Result	Rank
Hamdan El-Tayeb	100 m	11.1	6	did not advance					
Isaac Elie	110 m hurdles	DNF		did not advance					

== Boxing ==
Men

Athlete	Event	1 Round	2 Round	3 Round	Quarterfinals	Semifinals	Final
Athlete	Event	Opposition Result	Opposition Result	Opposition Result	Opposition Result	Opposition Result	Rank
Sayed Abdel Gadir	Featherweight	Phil Lundgren (GBR); L	did not advance				
Mohamed Rizgalla	Light-Welterweight	BYE	Sayed El-Nahas (UAR); L	did not advance			
Mohamed Faragalla	Welterweight	BYE	Jimmy Lloyd (GBR); L	did not advance			

== Shooting ==
Three shooters represented Sudan in 1960.

Men

Athlete	Event	Qualification		Final	
Athlete	Event	Score	Rank	Score	Rank
Gibreel Ali	Men's 50 metre rifle three positions	454	36	did not advance	
Gibreel Ali	Men's 50 metre rifle prone	357	40	did not advance	
Omar Anas	Men's 300 metre rifle three positions	812	37	did not advance	
Omar Anas	Men's 50 metre rifle three positions	381	37	did not advance	
Omar Anas	Men's 50 metre rifle prone	351	42	did not advance	
Basha Bakri	Men's 300 metre rifle three positions	421	39	did not advance	

== Weightlifting ==
Men

Athlete	Event	Military Press		Snatch		Clean & Jerk		Total	Rank
Athlete	Event	Result	Rank	Result	Rank	Result	Rank	Total	Rank
Ibrahim Mitwalli	67,5 kg	85.0	29	72.5	28	105.0	27	262.5	25
Mirza Adil	75 kg	90.0	23	85.0	21	115.0	20	290.0	20
