= Sudan at the 2020 Summer Olympics =

- IOC code: SUD
- NOC: Sudan Olympic Committee

in Tokyo, Japan July 23, 2021 – August 8, 2021
- Competitors: 5 in 4 sports
- Flag bearers (opening): Esraa Khogali; Abobakr Abass
- Flag bearer (closing): N/A
- Officials: 0
- Medals: Gold 0 Silver 0 Bronze 0 Total 0

Summer Olympics appearances (overview)
- 1960; 1964; 1968; 1972; 1976–1980; 1984; 1988; 1992; 1996; 2000; 2004; 2008; 2012; 2016; 2020; 2024

Other related appearances
- South Sudan (2016–)

Sudan competed at the 2020 Summer Olympics in Tokyo. Originally scheduled to take place during the summer of 2020, the Games were rescheduled for 23 July to 8 August 2021, due to the COVID-19 pandemic. This was the nation's twelfth appearance at the Summer Olympics.

== Competitors ==
The following is a list of the number of competitors in the Games.

Sport	Men	Women	Total
Athletics	1	0	1
Judo	1	0	1
Rowing	0	1	1
Swimming	1	1	2
Total	3	2	5

== Athletics ==
Sudan received a universality slot from the World Athletics to send a male track and field athlete.

Key

- Note–Ranks given for track events are within the athlete's heat only
- Q = Qualified for the next round
- q = Qualified for the next round as a fastest loser or, in field events, by position without achieving the qualifying target
- NR = National record
- N/A = Round not applicable for the event
- Bye = Athlete not required to compete in round

Track & road events

Athlete	Event	Heat		Semifinal		Final	
Athlete	Event	Result	Rank	Result	Rank	Result	Rank
Sadam Koumi	Men's 400 m	46.26 SB	5	Did not advance			

== Judo ==
Sudan received an invitation from the Tripartite Commission and the International Judo Federation to send Mohamed Abdalarasool in the men's lightweight category (73 kg).

Athlete	Event	Round of 64	Round of 32	Round of 16	Quarterfinals	Semifinals	Repechage	Final / BM	
Athlete	Event	Opposition Result	Opposition Result	Opposition Result	Opposition Result	Opposition Result	Opposition Result	Opposition Result	Rank
Mohamed Abdalarasool	Men's –73 kg	Nourine (ALG); W WO	Butbul (ISR); L FG	Did not advance					

== Rowing ==
Sudan received an invitation from the Tripartite Commission and World Rowing to send a rower in the women's single sculls to the Tokyo regatta, marking the nation's debut in the sport.

Athlete	Event	Heats		Repechage		Quarterfinals		Semifinals		Final	
Athlete	Event	Time	Rank	Time	Rank	Time	Rank	Time	Rank	Time	Rank
Esraa Khogali	Women's single sculls	10:18.27	6 R	10:25.94	5 SE/F	Bye		10:23.52	4 FF	10:05.32	32

Qualification Legend: FA=Final A (medal); FB=Final B (non-medal); FC=Final C (non-medal); FD=Final D (non-medal); FE=Final E (non-medal); FF=Final F (non-medal); SA/B=Semifinals A/B; SC/D=Semifinals C/D; SE/F=Semifinals E/F; QF=Quarterfinals; R=Repechage

== Swimming ==
Sudan received a universality invitation from FINA to send two top-ranked swimmers (one per gender) in their respective individual events, based on the FINA Points System of June 28, 2021.

Athlete	Event	Heat		Semifinal		Final	
Athlete	Event	Time	Rank	Time	Rank	Time	Rank
Abobakr Abass	Men's 100 m breaststroke	1:04.46	45	Did not advance			
Haneen Ibrahim	Women's 50 m freestyle	34.49	80	Did not advance			
