= Sudan at the 2024 Summer Olympics =

- IOC code: SUD
- NOC: Sudan Olympic Committee

in Paris, France 26 July 2024 – 11 August 2024
- Competitors: 4 (3 men and 1 woman) in 3 sports
- Flag bearers (opening): Yaseen Abdalla and Rana Saadeldin
- Flag bearer (closing): Yaseen Abdalla
- Medals: Gold 0 Silver 0 Bronze 0 Total 0

Summer Olympics appearances (overview)
- 1960; 1964; 1968; 1972; 1976–1980; 1984; 1988; 1992; 1996; 2000; 2004; 2008; 2012; 2016; 2020; 2024

Other related appearances
- South Sudan (2016–)

Sudan competed at the 2024 Summer Olympics in Paris, France, from 26 July to 11 August 2024. It was the nation's thirteenth appearances at the Summer Olympics.

== Competitors ==
The following is the list of number of competitors in the Games.

| Sport | Men | Women | Total |
|---|---|---|---|
| Athletics | 1 | 0 | 1 |
| Rowing | 1 | 0 | 1 |
| Swimming | 1 | 1 | 2 |
| Total | 3 | 1 | 4 |

== Athletics ==
One Sudanese runner will compete at Paris 2024, after receiving the direct universality spots in the following event:

Key

- Note–Ranks given for track events are within the athlete's heat only
- Q = Qualified for the next round
- q = Qualified for the next round as a fastest loser or, in field events, by position without achieving the qualifying target
- NR = National record
- N/A = Round not applicable for the event
- Bye = Athlete not required to compete in round

Track and road events

| Athlete | Event | Final | |
| Athlete | Event | Result | Rank |
|---|---|---|---|
| Yaseen Abdalla | Men's marathon | 2:11:41 NR | 33 |

== Rowing ==
Sudan send one rower in the men's single sculls to the Paris regatta.

| Athlete | Event | Heats | | Repechage | | Quarterfinals | | Semifinals | | Final | |
| Athlete | Event | Time | Rank | Time | Rank | Time | Rank | Time | Rank | Time | Rank |
|---|---|---|---|---|---|---|---|---|---|---|---|
| Abdalla Ahmed | Men's single sculls | 7:46.45 | 6 R | 7:55.79 | 5 SE/F | — | | 8:10.68 | 5 FF | 7:38.51 | 33 |

Qualification Legend: FA=Final A (medal); FB=Final B (non-medal); FC=Final C (non-medal); FD=Final D (non-medal); FE=Final E (non-medal); FF=Final F (non-medal); SA/B=Semifinals A/B; SC/D=Semifinals C/D; SE/F=Semifinals E/F; QF=Quarterfinals; R=Repechage

== Swimming ==
Sudan sent two swimmers to compete at the 2024 Paris Olympics.

| Athlete | Event | Heat | | Semifinal | | Final | |
| Athlete | Event | Time | Rank | Time | Rank | Time | Rank |
|---|---|---|---|---|---|---|---|
| Ziyad Saleem | Men's 200 m backstroke | 2:01.44 | 27 | Did not advance | | | |
| Rana Saadeldin | Women's 100 m freestyle | 1:04.72 | 29 | Did not advance | | | |

Qualifiers for the latter rounds (Q) of all events were decided on a time only basis, therefore positions shown are overall results versus competitors in all heats.
