= Sudan at the 2004 Summer Olympics =

- IOC code: SUD
- NOC: Sudan Olympic Committee

in Athens
- Competitors: 5 in 1 sport
- Flag bearer: Todd Matthews Jouda
- Medals: Gold 0 Silver 0 Bronze 0 Total 0

Summer Olympics appearances (overview)
- 1960; 1964; 1968; 1972; 1976–1980; 1984; 1988; 1992; 1996; 2000; 2004; 2008; 2012; 2016; 2020; 2024

Other related appearances
- South Sudan (2016–pres.)

Sudan competed at the 2004 Summer Olympics in Athens, Greece, from 13 to 29 August 2004.

== Athletics ==
Sudanese athletes had achieved qualifying standards in the following athletics events (up to a maximum of 3 athletes in each event at the 'A' Standard, and 1 at the 'B' Standard).

Men
Track & road events

Athlete	Event	Heat		Quarterfinal		Semifinal		Final	
Athlete	Event	Result	Rank	Result	Rank	Result	Rank	Result	Rank
Nagmeldin Ali Abubakr	400 m	46.32	6	—N/a		Did not advance			
Peter Roko Ashak	1500 m	DNS		—N/a		Did not advance			
Ismail Ahmed Ismail	800 m	1:45.17	2 Q	—N/a		1:45.45	2 Q	1:52.49	8
Todd Matthews Jouda	110 m hurdles	13.47 NR	4 Q	13.77	8	Did not advance			

Women
Field events

Athlete	Event	Qualification		Final	
Athlete	Event	Distance	Position	Distance	Position
Yamile Aldama	Triple jump	14.80	3 Q	14.99	5

Key

- Note–Ranks given for track events are within the athlete's heat only
- Q = Qualified for the next round
- q = Qualified for the next round as a fastest loser or, in field events, by position without achieving the qualifying target
- NR = National record
- N/A = Round not applicable for the event
- Bye = Athlete not required to compete in round

== See also ==
- Sudan at the 2004 Summer Paralympics
