= Sudan at the 1984 Summer Olympics =

- IOC code: SUD
- NOC: Sudan Olympic Committee

in Los Angeles
- Competitors: 7 in 2 sports
- Flag bearer: Abdul Al-Lalif
- Medals: Gold 0 Silver 0 Bronze 0 Total 0

Summer Olympics appearances (overview)
- 1960; 1964; 1968; 1972; 1976–1980; 1984; 1988; 1992; 1996; 2000; 2004; 2008; 2012; 2016; 2020; 2024

Other related appearances
- South Sudan (2016–)

Sudan competed at the 1984 Summer Olympics in Los Angeles, United States. The nation returned to the Olympic Games after boycotting both the 1976 and 1980 Games.

== Athletics ==
Men
Track & road events

Athlete	Event	Heat		Quarterfinal		Semifinal		Final	
Athlete	Event	Result	Rank	Result	Rank	Result	Rank	Result	Rank
Hassan El-Kashief	400 m	DNF		did not advance					
Omer Khalifa	800 m	1:45.81	3 Q	1:46.33	2 Q	1:44.87	5	did not advance	
Omer Khalifa	1500 m	3:38.93	2 Q	—		3:36.76	5 Q	3:37.11	8
Ahmed Musa Jouda	5000 m	13:59.41	9	did not advance					
Ahmed Musa Jouda	10,000 m	28:20.26	8 Q	—				28:29.43	10

== Boxing ==
Men

Athlete	Event	1 Round	2 Round	3 Round	Quarterfinals	Semifinals	Final
Athlete	Event	Opposition Result	Opposition Result	Opposition Result	Opposition Result	Opposition Result	Rank
Alego Akomi	Light-Flyweight	BYE	John Lyon (GBR); L 0-5	did not advance			
Tobi Pelly	Featherweight	Paul Fitzgerald (IRL); L 0-5	did not advance				
Abock Shoak	Welterweight	An Young-Su (KOR); L 0-5	did not advance				
Augustino Marial	Light-Middleweight	Fletcher Kapito (MAW); W 3-2	Ahn Dal-Ho (KOR); L 0-5	did not advance			
