= Sudan at the 1988 Summer Olympics =

- IOC code: SUD
- NOC: Sudan Olympic Committee

in Seoul
- Competitors: 8 in 2 sports
- Flag bearer: Omer Khalifa
- Medals: Gold 0 Silver 0 Bronze 0 Total 0

Summer Olympics appearances (overview)
- 1960; 1964; 1968; 1972; 1976–1980; 1984; 1988; 1992; 1996; 2000; 2004; 2008; 2012; 2016; 2020; 2024

Other related appearances
- South Sudan (2016–)

Sudan competed at the 1988 Summer Olympics in Seoul, South Korea.

== Competitors ==
The following is the list of number of competitors in the Games.

Sport	Men	Women	Total
Athletics	3	0	3
Boxing	5	–	5
Total	8	0	8

== Athletics ==
Men
Track & road events

Athlete	Event	Heat		Quarterfinal		Semifinal		Final	
Athlete	Event	Result	Rank	Result	Rank	Result	Rank	Result	Rank
Omer Khalifa	1500 m	3:41.46	14 Q	—		3:38.40	3 Q	3:41.07	12
Abdel Rahman Massad	5000 m	15:50.91	18	did not advance					
Ahmed Musa Jouda	10,000 m	29:03.87	26	did not advance					

== Boxing ==
Men

Athlete	Event	1 Round	2 Round	3 Round	Quarterfinals	Semifinals	Final
Athlete	Event	Opposition Result	Opposition Result	Opposition Result	Opposition Result	Opposition Result	Rank
Peter Anok	Bantamweight	Aleksandar Khristov (BUL); L 1-4	did not advance				
John Mirona	Featherweight	BYE	Ya'acov Shmuel (ISR); L RSC-1	did not advance			
Tobi Pelly	Lightweight	BYE	Kassim Traoré (MLI); L 0-5	did not advance			
Abdullah Ramadan	Light-Middleweight	BYE	Park Si-Hun (KOR); L RSC-2	did not advance			
Mohamed Hammad	Super-Heavyweight	BYE	Kim Yoo-Hyun (KOR); L AB-1	did not advance			
