= Sudan at the 2000 Summer Olympics =

- IOC code: SUD
- NOC: Sudan Olympic Committee

in Sydney
- Competitors: 3 in 2 sports
- Flag bearer: Mahmoud Kieno
- Medals: Gold 0 Silver 0 Bronze 0 Total 0

Summer Olympics appearances (overview)
- 1960; 1964; 1968; 1972; 1976–1980; 1984; 1988; 1992; 1996; 2000; 2004; 2008; 2012; 2016; 2020; 2024

Other related appearances
- South Sudan (2016–)

Sudan competed at the 2000 Summer Olympics in Sydney, Australia.

== Competitors ==
The following is the list of number of competitors in the Games.

| Sport | Men | Women | Total |
|---|---|---|---|
| Athletics | 1 | 1 | 2 |
| Swimming | 1 | 0 | 1 |
| Total | 2 | 1 | 3 |

== Athletics ==
Men
Track & road events

| Athlete | Event | Heat | | Quarterfinal | | Semifinal | | Final | |
| Athlete | Event | Result | Rank | Result | Rank | Result | Rank | Result | Rank |
|---|---|---|---|---|---|---|---|---|---|
| Mohamed Babiker Yagoub | 800 m | DNF | | did not advance | | | | | |
| Mohamed Babiker Yagoub | 1500 m | 3:39.52 | 9 q | — | | 3:50.60 | 12 | did not advance | |

Women
Track & road events

| Athlete | Event | Heat | | Quarterfinal | | Semifinal | | Final | |
| Athlete | Event | Result | Rank | Result | Rank | Result | Rank | Result | Rank |
|---|---|---|---|---|---|---|---|---|---|
| Awmima Mohamed | 400 m | 1:02.94 | 8 | did not advance | | | | | |

== Swimming ==
Men

| Athlete | Event | Heat | | Semifinal | | Final | |
| Athlete | Event | Result | Rank | Result | Rank | Result | Rank |
|---|---|---|---|---|---|---|---|
| Mohamed Abdul Hamid | 50 m freestyle | DQ | | did not advance | | | |
