= Sudan at the 1996 Summer Olympics =

- IOC code: SUD
- NOC: Sudan Olympic Committee

in Atlanta
- Competitors: 4 in 2 sports
- Flag bearer: Mahmoud Musa Abdullah
- Medals: Gold 0 Silver 0 Bronze 0 Total 0

Summer Olympics appearances (overview)
- 1960; 1964; 1968; 1972; 1976–1980; 1984; 1988; 1992; 1996; 2000; 2004; 2008; 2012; 2016; 2020; 2024

Other related appearances
- South Sudan (2016–)

Sudan competed at the 1996 Summer Olympics in Atlanta, United States.

== Competitors ==
The following is the list of number of competitors in the Games.

Sport	Men	Women	Total
Athletics	3	0	3
Table tennis	1	0	1
Total	4	0	4

== Athletics ==
Men
Track & road events

Athlete	Event	Heat		Quarterfinal		Semifinal		Final	
Athlete	Event	Result	Rank	Result	Rank	Result	Rank	Result	Rank
Ahmed Adam	Marathon	—						2:25:12	68
Khamis Abdullah Saifeldin	5000 metres	14:15.21	31	did not advance					
Mohamed Babiker Yagoub	800 m	1:48.50	29	did not advance					

== Table Tennis ==
=== Group A ===
Rank	Athlete	W	L	GW	GL	PW	PL	CHN	TPE	JPN	SUD
1	Kong Linghui (CHN)	3	0	6	0	126	75	X	2–0	2–0	2–0
2	Chiang Peng-lung (TPE)	2	1	4	2	118	89	0–2	X	2–0	2–0
3	Toshio Tasaki (JPN)	1	2	2	4	96	107	0–2	0–2	X	2–0
4	Ahmed Mohamed Osama (SUD)	0	3	0	6	57	126	0–2	0–2	0–2	X
