= Sudan at the 2016 Summer Olympics =

- IOC code: SUD
- NOC: Sudan Olympic Committee

in Rio de Janeiro
- Competitors: 6 in 3 sports
- Flag bearer: Abdalla Targan
- Medals: Gold 0 Silver 0 Bronze 0 Total 0

Summer Olympics appearances (overview)
- 1960; 1964; 1968; 1972; 1976–1980; 1984; 1988; 1992; 1996; 2000; 2004; 2008; 2012; 2016; 2020; 2024

Other related appearances
- South Sudan (2016–pres.)

Sudan competed at the 2016 Summer Olympics in Rio de Janeiro, Brazil, from 5 to 21 August 2016. This was the nation's eleventh appearance at the Summer Olympics.

The Sudan Olympic Committee had selected six athletes, four men and two women, to compete in athletics, swimming, and judo, matching the nation's roster size with London 2012. Five of the athletes made their Olympic debut in Rio de Janeiro, except for middle-distance runner Amina Bakhit (women's 800 m), the lone returning Olympian. Steeplechaser Abdalla Targan led the Sudanese delegation as the nation's team captain and flag bearer in the opening ceremony.

Sudan left Rio de Janeiro without winning a single Olympic medal, failing to replicate its performance from the 2008 Summer Olympics in Beijing, where Ismail Ahmed Ismail earned a silver in the men's 800 metres, which marked the last time the country had won a medal at the Summer Olympics.

== Athletics (track and field) ==
Sudanese athletes achieved qualifying standards in the following athletics events (up to a maximum of 3 athletes in each event):

Key

- Note–Ranks given for track events are within the athlete's heat only
- Q = Qualified for the next round
- q = Qualified for the next round as a fastest loser or, in field events, by position without achieving the qualifying target
- NR = National record
- N/A = Round not applicable for the event
- Bye = Athlete not required to compete in round

Track & road events

Athlete	Event	Heat		Semifinal		Final	
Athlete	Event	Result	Rank	Result	Rank	Result	Rank
Ahmed Ali	Men's 200 m	20.78	=7	did not advance			
Abdalla Targan	Men's 3000 m steeplechase	8:52.20	15	—N/a		did not advance	
Amina Bakhit	Women's 800 m	2:07.65	7	did not advance			

== Judo ==
Sudan received an invitation from the Tripartite Commission to send a judoka competing in the men's middleweight category (90 kg) to the Olympics, signifying the nation's return to the sport for the first time since 1992.

Athlete	Event	Round of 64	Round of 32	Round of 16	Quarterfinals	Semifinals	Repechage	Final / BM	
Athlete	Event	Opposition Result	Opposition Result	Opposition Result	Opposition Result	Opposition Result	Opposition Result	Opposition Result	Rank
Iszlam Monier Suliman	Men's −90 kg	Bye	Brown (USA); L 000–100	did not advance					

== Swimming ==
Sudan received Universality invitations from FINA to send two swimmers (one male and one female).

Athlete	Event	Heat		Semifinal		Final	
Athlete	Event	Time	Rank	Time	Rank	Time	Rank
Abdelaziz Mohamed Ahmed	Men's 50 m freestyle	27.71	81	did not advance			
Haneen Ibrahim	Women's 50 m freestyle	36.23	84	did not advance			
