= Disability in Sudan =

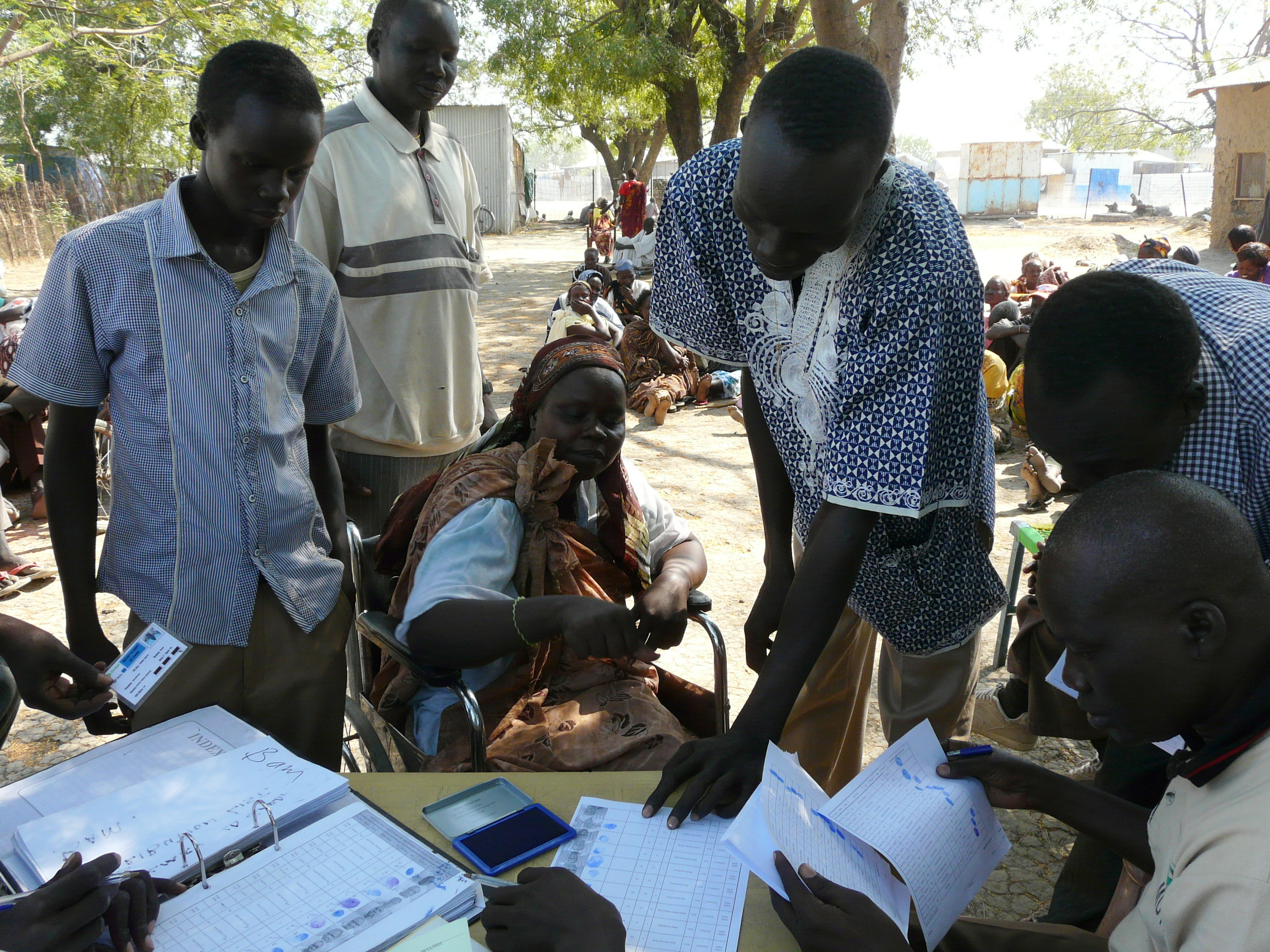
A Sudanese woman in a wheelchair

People with disability in Sudan have certain legal protections, which were laid out in 2017 and 2019 with the Persons with Disability National Act and the new constitution, respectively. Though statistics on it are thought to be underreported, estimates range from 5-15% of the population being disabled.

Though since Sudan ratified the UN Convention on the Rights of persons with Disabilities in 2009, an EU report confirmed the situation for disabled people had improved, the frameworks were seen as shoddy and disabled rights have become threatened once again by the humanitarian crisis that has ensued since the beginning of the civil war.

== Legislation ==
Sudan ratified the UN Convention on the Rights of Persons with Disabilities in 2009. Parties to the convention are required to promote, protect, and ensure the full enjoyment of human rights by persons with disabilities and ensure that persons with disabilities enjoy full equality under the law. As for implementation on these promises, a 2019 review of disability rights in Sudan 10 years on from the ratification of the convention found that though rights had improved in this time, the frameworks surrounding them were weak and work was far from finished.

=== Persons with Disability National Act ===
In 2017, the Sudanese government passed the Persons with Disability National Act, which defined a person with a disability as "any person who was born or sustained deficiency partially or totally affected his physical, mental or sensory capacity permanently that may completely prevent him from dealing with various barriers", and also set the provision for rehabilitation for disabled people, improvements in disability equity and combating discrimination in education and employment against disabled people.

=== Protections in the constitution ===
The 2019 constitution built upon this by codifying it constitutionally, and it guarantees the rights of people with disabilities, saying:

The state guarantees for handicapped persons all the rights and freedoms set forth in this Charter, in particular respect for their human dignity. It makes available appropriate education and work for them, and guarantee their full participation in society.

The document also emphasizes disabled people's rights to education, healthcare, and work opportunities, and says that Sudan is “committed to the respect of human dignity and diversity; and is founded on justice, equality and on the guarantee of human rights and fundamental freedoms.”

== History ==
In 1993, Sudan had a disability rate of 1.6%. This was the first year in which disability had been included as a question on the census. The questions asked where "Is there a person with a disability living in this household", and if answered yes, was followed up with "What type of disability is it?" - of which the options were mobility disability, blindness, deaf/mute, mental disability, or other. In 2008, the census observed an increase to almost 5%.

Before the war, the Sudanese Disability movement was founded, and in 2019 Ashraf Mizo started Nayla Prosthetics, which aimed to work with people with disabilities to make lightweight prosthetic limbs for amputees that were culturally appropriate.

=== Civil war ===
The Sudanese civil war has increased the number of disabled people through conflict, and intensified the difficulty of the lives of people already living with disabilities. Humanity & Inclusion, an NGO operating in Sudan, said in 2014 that people with disabilities were "hardest hit" by the humanitarian crisis caused by the civil war in Sudan. Sources have shown that there are many people with serious disabilities living in refugee camps without adequate healthcare facilities, such as amputees and paraplegics, as well as people with special needs. Institutions for people with disabilities have also been affected, which has in turn affected the living conditions of disabled people. In 2023 a disabled 11-year-old was killed in the shelling of a homeless women's shelter.

== Statistics ==
As of 2008, there were 5% of the population of Sudan had various degrees of disability. Types of disabilities in Sudan are visual impairment (31%) and mental disability (24%). Estimates range differently however, as data is sometimes difficult to come by. The Swedish International Development Cooperation Agency (SIDA) used the worldwide disability rate of 10-15% to estimate that there were between 1.9 and 3.8 million disabled people in Sudan in a report in 2014.

The 2008 census found that 26% of disabled people lived in an urban area, 66.7% lived in a rural area, and the remaining 7% were nomads. The disabilities as listed by the options on the census were -

Type of Disability	Number	Percentage
Limited use of leg(s)	336,517	18.14%
Loss of leg(s)	61,476	3.31%
Limited Use of Arm(s)	105,989	5.71%
Loss of Arm(s)	25,848	1.39%
Difficulty in Hearing	244,462	13.17%
Deaf	63,034	3.39%
Difficulty in Seeing	583,715	31.46%
Blind	92,468	4.98%
Difficulty in Speaking	73,328	3.95%
Mute	43,825	2.36%
Mental Disability	448,451	24.17%
Total	1,854,985	100%

== See also ==
- Sudan at the Paralympics
