= South Sudan National Olympic Committee =

National Olympic Committee

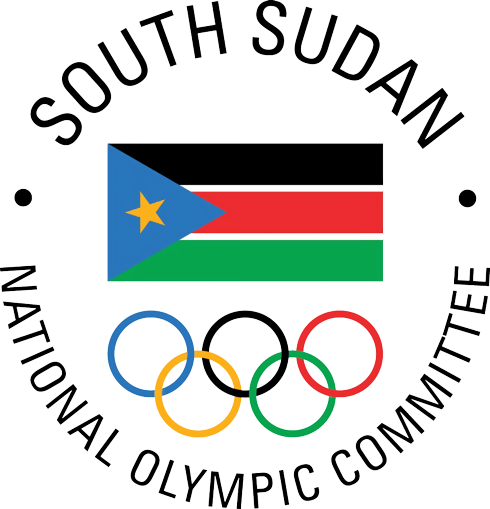
- Country: South Sudan
- Code: SSD
- Created: 8 June 2015
- Recognized: 2 August 2015
- Continental Association: ANOCA
- President: Choul Pal Gai Laam
- Secretary General: Chol Anei Kuot

The South Sudan National Olympic Committee is the National Olympic Committee (NOC) representing South Sudan. It was founded in Juba on 8 June 2015, and became a full member of the International Olympic Committee (IOC) and the Olympic Movement on 2 August 2015. In 2015, South Sudan satisfied the IOC's criterion of five national sports federations recognised by their international sports federations, which included athletics, basketball, association football, handball, judo, table tennis, and taekwondo. The current president has been Juma Stephen Lugga Lemi since 2017. The NOC is a signatory to the World Anti-Doping Code published by the World Anti-Doping Agency.

== History ==
South Sudan gained its independence from Sudan in 2011, but the South Sudanese Civil War made it difficult for the nation to garner the support of five sports federations as required for its National Olympic Committee to gain recognition by the International Olympic Committee. The NOC was founded by representatives on 8 June 2015. South Sudan became the 206th IOC member on 2 August 2015 at its session in Kuala Lumpur by acclamation. It had the affiliations of athletics, basketball, association football, handball, judo, table tennis, and taekwondo.

== Facilities and management ==
Due to the war, many of South Sudan's sporting facilities have broken down. The nation does not have a standard athletics track and relies on international aid for sports infrastructure. South Sudan also has one basketball stadium in Juba where the South Sudan Basketball Championship is played. The first president of the NOC was Lieutenant General Wilson Deng Kuoirot, who was elected in 2015 uncontested and served until 2017. Since the end of Kuoirot's term, the president has been Juma Stephen Lugga Lemi, who was re-elected in 2022. The first and current secretary is Tong Chor Malek Deran. The NOC is a signatory to the World Anti-Doping Code published by the World Anti-Doping Agency.

== Events ==
=== Olympics ===
South Sudan first participated at the Olympic Games in 2016, and have competed in every Summer Olympic Games since then. The country has not competed at the Winter Olympic Games, or ever won a medal. In their first two Olympics, 2016 and 2020, South Sudan competed only in athletics, but in 2024 they also competed in basketball.

In 2016, South Sudan sent three athletes. Santino Kenyi and Margret Hassan participated in the men's 1500 metres and women's 200 metres sprint, respectively. While Guor Marial participated in the men's marathon. The country sent one male and one female athlete to the 2020 Summer Olympics, Abraham Guem and Lucia Moris. They participated in the men's 800 metres and women's 200 metres, respectively. The nation sent two athletes in athletics and a basketball team to the 2024 Summer Olympics. The athletics participants were Guem and Moris. They participated in the men's 1500 metres and women's 200 metres, respectively. The basketball team included 12 players; Junior Madut, Nuni Omot, Carlik Jones, Khaman Maluach, Kuany Kuany, Marial Shayok, Deng Acuoth, Majok Deng, Peter Jok, Koch Bar, Wenyen Gabriel, and Sunday Dech.

== Affiliated sports ==
Sports governing bodies affiliated to the South Sudan National Olympic Committee
Sport	Body	Federation	Refs
Athletics	South Sudan Athletics Federation	IAAF	
Basketball	South Sudan Basketball Federation	FIBA	
Association football	South Sudan Football Association	FIFA	
Handball	South Sudan Handball Federation	IHF	
Judo	South Sudan Judo Federation	IJF	
Table tennis	South Sudan Table Tennis Federation	ITTF	
Taekwondo	South Sudan Taekwondo Federation	WTF	
