= Sudan at the 2012 Summer Olympics =

- IOC code: SUD
- NOC: Sudan Olympic Committee

in London
- Competitors: 6 in 2 sports
- Flag bearers: Ismail Ahmed Ismail (opening); Rabah Yousif (closing)
- Medals: Gold 0 Silver 0 Bronze 0 Total 0

Summer Olympics appearances (overview)
- 1960; 1964; 1968; 1972; 1976–1980; 1984; 1988; 1992; 1996; 2000; 2004; 2008; 2012; 2016; 2020; 2024

Other related appearances
- South Sudan (2016–pres.)

Sudan competed at the 2012 Summer Olympics in London, from 27 July to 12 August 2012. This was the nation's eleventh appearance at the Olympics, since its debut in 1960. Sudan, however, did not attend the 1976 Summer Olympics in Montreal and the 1980 Summer Olympics in Moscow because of the African and the United States boycott.

Six Sudanese athletes were selected to the team, competing only in track and field and in swimming. Middle-distance runner and Olympic silver medalist Ismail Ahmed Ismail was the nation's flag bearer at the opening ceremony. For the first time since 2004, Sudan left the Olympics without winning even a single medal. Double world indoor champion Abubaker Kaki missed out on a podium finish, placing seventh in the final standings of the men's 800-meter event.

== Athletics ==
Sudanese athletes achieved qualifying standards in the following athletics events (up to a maximum of 3 athletes in each event at the 'A' Standard, and 1 at the 'B' Standard):

Key

- Note – Ranks given for track events are within the athlete's heat only
- Q = Qualified for the next round
- q = Qualified for the next round as a fastest loser or, in field events, by position without achieving the qualifying target
- NR = National record
- N/A = Round not applicable for the event
- Bye = Athlete not required to compete in round

Men

Athlete	Event	Heat		Semifinal		Final	
Athlete	Event	Result	Rank	Result	Rank	Result	Rank
Ismail Ahmed Ismail	800 m	1:48.79	6	did not advance			
Abubaker Kaki	800 m	1:45.51	1 Q	1:44.51	1 Q	1:43.32	7
Rabah Yousif	400 m	45.46	3 Q	45.13	4	did not advance	

Women

Athlete	Event	Heat		Semifinal		Final	
Athlete	Event	Result	Rank	Result	Rank	Result	Rank
Amina Bakhit	800 m	2:09.78	4	did not advance			

== Swimming ==
Sudan gained two "Universality places" from the FINA.

Men

Athlete	Event	Heat		Semifinal		Final	
Athlete	Event	Time	Rank	Time	Rank	Time	Rank
Mohamed Elkhedr	50 m freestyle	27.26	50	did not advance			

Women

Athlete	Event	Heat		Semifinal		Final	
Athlete	Event	Time	Rank	Time	Rank	Time	Rank
Mhasin El Nour Fadlalla	50 m freestyle	35.07	70	did not advance			
