= Sudan at the 1980 Summer Paralympics =

- IPC code: SUD
- NPC: Sudan National Paralympic Committee

in Arnhem
- Competitors: 11 in 3 sports
- Medals: Gold 1 Silver 0 Bronze 0 Total 1

Summer Paralympics appearances (overview)
- 1980; 1984–2000; 2004; 2008–2024

The Sudan made its Paralympic début at the 1980 Summer Paralympics in Arnhem. The country was represented by eleven athletes competing in track and field, swimming and table tennis.

The Sudan won a single medal, when Mohamad Basheer Eltigani took gold in the men's shot put, 1B category.

This was to be the Sudan's last participation in the Paralympic Games before 2004.

== See also ==
- Sudan at the Paralympics
