= Sudan at the Paralympics =

- IPC code: SUD
- NPC: Sudan National Paralympic Committee
- Medals: Gold 1 Silver 0 Bronze 0 Total 1

Summer appearances
- 1980; 1984–2000; 2004; 2008–2024

Sudan made its Summer Paralympic Games début at the 1980 Summer Paralympics in Arnhem, sending a delegation of eleven athletes to compete in track and field, swimming and table tennis. The country did not participate again until the 2004 Summer Paralympics in Athens, where it was represented by just two competitors in track and field. Sudan was absent again at the 2008 Games.

Sudan has won one Paralympic medal, a gold won by Mohamad Ahmed Isam in 1980.

Sudan has never participated in the Winter Paralympic Games.

== Medal tables ==
=== Medals by Summer Games ===
Games	Athletes	Gold	Silver	Bronze	Total	Rank
1980 Arnhem	11	1	0	0	1	33
2004 Athens	2	0	0	0	0	–
Total		1	0	0	1	71

=== Medals by Summer sport ===
Sport	Gold	Silver	Bronze	Total
Athletics	1	0	0	1
Totals (1 entries)	1	0	0	1

== List of medalists ==
Medal	Name	Games	Sport	Event
Gold	Mohamad Bashir El Tijani	1980 Arnhem	Athletics	Men's Shot Put 1B

== See also ==
- Sudan at the Olympics
