= Independent Olympic Athletes at the 2014 Summer Youth Olympics =

- IOC code: IOA

in Nanjing
- Competitors: 1 in 1 sport

Summer Youth Olympics appearances
- 2010; 2014; 2018

One Independent Olympic Athlete competed at the 2014 Summer Youth Olympics in Nanjing, China. The athlete was from South Sudan.

== Background ==
South Sudan gained its independence from Sudan in June 2011. As of the 2014 Summer Youth Olympics, it had not formed a National Olympic Committee, implying that athletes from this nation were unable to enter with a National Olympic Committee (NOC). However the International Olympic Committee agreed to allow a runner to compete under the Olympic flag.

== Athletics ==
One athlete was chosen to compete.

Girls
Track & road events

Athlete	Event	Heats		Final	
Athlete	Event	Result	Rank	Result	Rank
Margret Hassan	400 m	1:04.48	19 qC	1:01.72	19
