= Sudan at the 2004 Summer Paralympics =

- IPC code: SUD
- NPC: Sudan National Paralympic Committee

in Athens
- Competitors: 2 in 1 sport
- Flag bearer: El Sadig Ashim Baien
- Medals: Gold 0 Silver 0 Bronze 0 Total 0

Summer Paralympics appearances (overview)
- 1980; 1984–2000; 2004; 2008–2024

The Sudan competed at the 2004 Summer Paralympics in Athens. It was the country's first appearance at the Games since 1980. The Sudan was represented by two athletes, both competing in the discus event; neither of them won a medal.

== Sports ==
=== Athletics ===
==== Men's field ====
Athlete	Class	Event	Final		
Athlete	Class	Event	Result	Points	Rank
El Sadig Ashim Baien	F37	Discus	30.71	-	7

==== Women's field ====
Athlete	Class	Event	Final		
Athlete	Class	Event	Result	Points	Rank
Salma G. Mohamed	F37	Discus	15.51	710	11

== See also ==
- Sudan at the Paralympics
- Sudan at the 2004 Summer Olympics
