= Khaled Ahmed Musa =

Sudanese long jumper

Personal information
- Nationality: Sudanese
- Born: 23 November 1972 (age 53)

Sport
- Sport: Athletics
- Event: Long jump

Khaled Ahmed Musa (born 23 November 1972) is a Sudanese athlete. He competed in the men's long jump at the 1992 Summer Olympics.
