= Stephen Lugor =

Sudanese sprinter

Personal information
- Nationality: Sudanese
- Born: 1967 (age 58–59)

Sport
- Sport: Sprinting
- Event: 400 metres

Stephen Lugor (born 1967) is a Sudanese sprinter. He competed in the men's 400 metres at the 1992 Summer Olympics.
