= Ahmed Adam (swimmer) =

Sudanese swimmer (born 1987)

Personal information
- Born: August 24, 1987 (age 38)

Sport
- Sport: Swimming

Ahmed Adam (Arabic: احمد آدم; born 24 August 1987) is a Sudanese swimmer. He competed at the 2008 Summer Olympics in the Men's 50 metre freestyle, but did not advance.
