= Mirza Adil =

Sudanese weightlifter

Personal information
- Nationality: Sudanese
- Born: 30 March 1943 (age 81); Khartoum, Sudan
- Height: 1.77 m (5 ft 10 in)
- Weight: 73 kg (161 lb)

Sport
- Sport: Weightlifting

Mirza Adil (born 30 March 1943) is a Sudanese weightlifter. He competed in the 1960 Summer Olympics.
