= Kuany Kuany (basketball, born 1994) =

South Sudanese-Australian basketball player

Free Agent
- Position: Forward

Personal information
- Born: 8 July 1994 (age 32) Aweil, South Sudan
- Listed height: 2.01 m (6 ft 7 in)
- Listed weight: 91 kg (201 lb)

Career information
- College: Chaminade (2013–2017)
- NBA draft: 2017: undrafted
- Playing career: 2017–present

Career history
- 2017–2019: Cairns Taipans
- 2019: Ballarat Miners
- 2019: Sydney Kings
- 2021: Sandringham Sabres
- 2021–2022: Vrijednosnice Osijek
- 2022–2023: Kauhajoen Karhu

Kuany Ngor Kuany (born 8 July 1994) is a South Sudanese-Australian basketball player who last played for Kauhajoen Karhu of the Finnish League and FIBA Europe Cup.

== Professional career ==
Born in Aweil, South Sudan, Kuany moved to Melbourne, Australia at age 9. Kuany started his professional career in 2017 with the Cairns Taipans of the NBL. He stayed there for two seasons. On 20 December 2018, Kuany had a career-high 10 points in a home loss to the Sydney Kings. In the 2018–19 season, Kuany played with the Ballarat Miners in the NBL1. There, he averaged 17.7 points, 5.5 rebounds and 2.2 assists per game.

On 15 September 2019, Kuany signed with the Sydney Kings. On 27 November, he was delisted from the roster by the Kings after the team acquired Xavier Cooks.

In 2021, Kuany returned to the NBL1 to play with the Sandringham Sabres, where he averaged 20.2 points per game in 12 games.

In September, 2021, Kuany signed for Vrijednosnice Osijek of the Croatian League and the ABA League Second Division.

== National team career ==
Kuany has played for the South Sudan national basketball team. At AfroBasket 2021, he contributed 11.8 points and 5.5 rebounds as a starter, helping the team reach the quarterfinals in its first major tournament.

In August 2023, Kuany was named in the South Sudan squad for the 2023 FIBA World Cup.

In 2024, Kuany not only was named the captain of the South Sudan national basketball team, but he would also be the co-flag bearer for South Sudan in the 2024 Summer Olympics in Paris, France alongside track and field athlete Lucia Moris.

Olympic Games
Preceded by Abraham Guem; Lucia Moris	Flag bearer for South Sudan; Paris 2024 with Lucia Moris	Succeeded by Incumbent
