= South Sudan Basketball Federation =

National governing body for basketball

- Founded: 2011
- Affiliation: FIBA
- Affiliation date: November 24, 2013
- Regional affiliation: FIBA Africa
- Headquarters: Star Village Gudele Road, Juba
- President: Luol Deng

The South Sudan Basketball Federation (SSBF) is the official national basketball federation of South Sudan. Its headquarters are located at Juba.

== Activities ==
The federation is responsible for the organisation, management and development of the basketball sport in South Sudan. It represents the sport of basketball and is communicating with the national administration as with other national and international sport organisations. The SSBF also advocates the moral and material interests of the local sport. The federation organises the national championship and is also responsible for the South Sudan men's national basketball team and South Sudan woman's national basketball team and their youth.

== History ==
The federation was founded shortly after South Sudan gained its independence in 2011. South Sudan became an affiliated member of the Fédération Internationale de Basketball (FIBA) and also FIBA Africa on November 24, 2013. The SSBF became one of the founding members of the South Sudan National Olympic Committee in 2014.

Luol Deng is the current president of the federation since 2019. he was re-elected in February 2024.

== National teams ==
=== Men ===
- South Sudan men's national basketball team
- South Sudan national under-19 basketball team
- South Sudan national under-17 basketball team

=== Women ===
- South Sudan women's national basketball team
- South Sudan women's national under-19 basketball team
- South Sudan women's national under-17 basketball team
