= Mohamed Elkhedr =

Sudanese Olympic swimmer

Personal information
- Born: February 22, 1988 (age 38) Atbarah, Sudan

Sport
- Sport: Swimming

Mohamed Elkhedr (born 22 February 1988) is a Sudanese Olympic swimmer. He represented Sudan at the 2012 Summer Olympics in the Men's 50 metre freestyle event where he was ranked 50th with a time of 27.26 seconds.
