= Abdel Wahab Abdullah Salih =

Sudanese boxer (born 1946)

Personal information
- Nationality: Sudanese
- Born: 1946 (age 79–80) Khartoum, Sudan
- Height: 1.90 m (6 ft 3 in)
- Weight: 75 kg (165 lb)

Sport
- Sport: Boxing

Abdel Wahab Abdullah Salih (born 1946) is a Sudanese boxer. He competed in the 1968 and 1972 Summer Olympics.
