= Margret Hassan =

South Sudanese sprinter

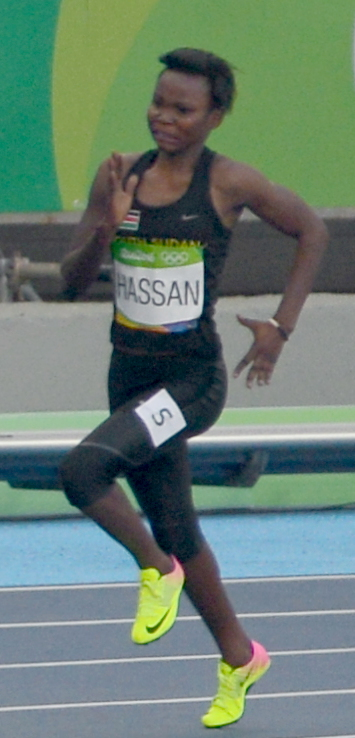
- Hassan at the 2016 Olympics

Personal information
- Nationality: South Sudanese
- Born: 12 August 1997 (age 28)
- Height: 160 cm (5 ft 3 in)
- Weight: 55 kg (121 lb)

Sport
- Sport: Athletics
- Coached by: Joseph Ramadan Jirvasio

Margret Rumat Rumar Hassan (born 12 August 1997), known as Margret Hassan, is a South Sudanese sprinter. She competed at the 2016 Summer Olympics in Rio de Janeiro, in the 200 metres.

== Early life ==
Hassan is originally from Wau, South Sudan. As a child, her family left their home due to the war with Sudan. The war prevented Hassan from getting an education. Hassan was still pursuing her primary education during her training for the 2016 Summer Olympics.

Hassan started as an association football player, and in 2012 changed to athletics. She began running competitively at the urging of a friend.

== Athletics career ==
Hassan was selected to compete as an "Independent Olympic Athlete," a designation for athletes who are unable to compete under their nation's flag, at the 2014 Youth Olympics held in Nanjing, China. Hassan was given the honor of carrying the Olympic flag as a representative of the Independent Olympic Athletes at the opening ceremony. She competed in the 400 metre distance at the games, finishing with a time of 61.72 seconds.

In June 2016, Hassan competed at the African Championship and recorded a time of 27.61 in the 200 metre distance and, later the same year, Hassan was part of South Sudan's first Olympic team. She competed at the 2016 Summer Olympics in the 200 metre distance. She finished last in her round 1 heat with a time of 26.99 seconds, a personal best.

== Corporate sponsorship ==
In June 2016, Samsung began featuring Hassan in advertisements. The deal caused controversy when Hassan was selected to compete for South Sudan Olympics over sprinter Mangar Makur Chuot. The secretary-general of South Sudan's National Olympic Committee, Tong Deran, said he felt "pressure" to pick Hassan due to the advertising contract with Samsung. Samsung denied placing pressure on the committee and the Court of Arbitration for Sport has dismissed a complaint from Chuot.
