= Santino Kenyi =

South Sudanese middle-distance runner

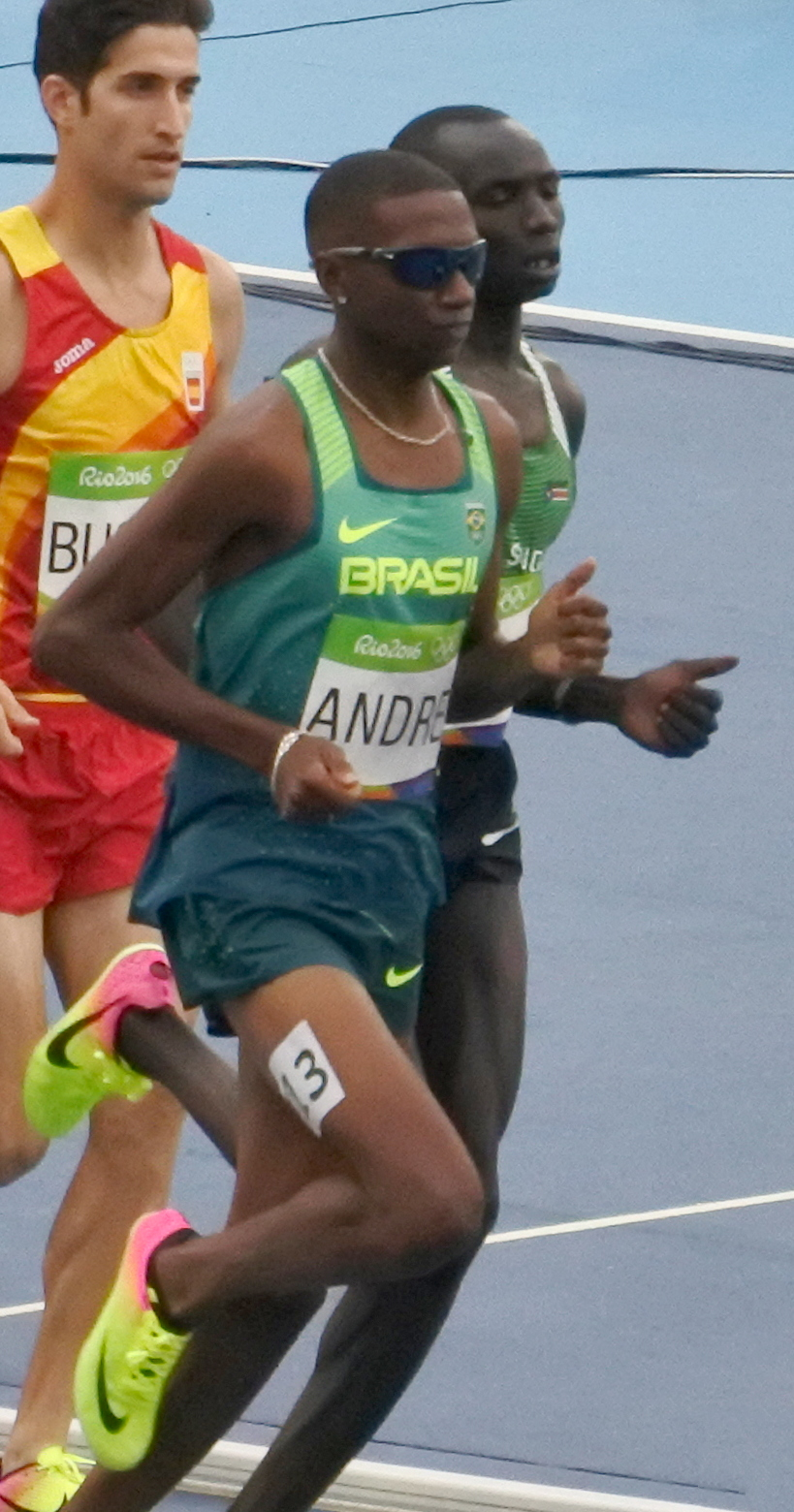
- Kenyi (right) at the 2016 Olympics

Personal information
- Nationality: South Sudanese
- Born: 14 August 1993 (age 32)
- Height: 180 cm (5 ft 11 in)
- Weight: 65 kg (143 lb)

Sport
- Sport: Athletics
- Event: 1500 m

Achievements and titles
- Personal best: 3:45.27 (2016)

Santino Kenyi (born 14 August 1993) is a South Sudanese middle-distance runner. He competed in the 1500 metres event at the 2016 Summer Olympics, but was eliminated in the preliminary round.
