= Abraham Guem =

South Sudanese athlete

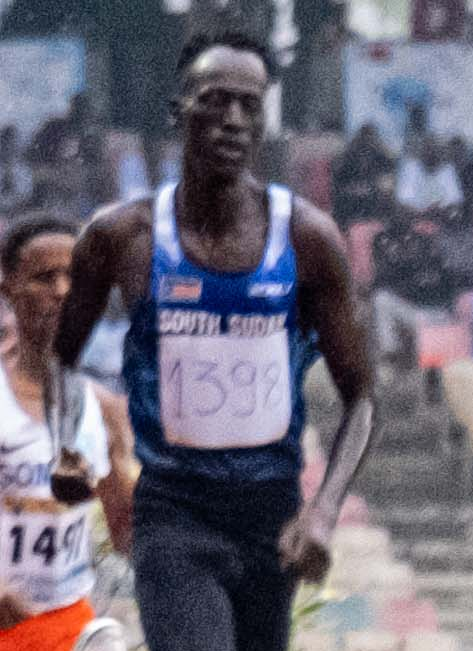

Personal information
- Full name: Abraham Majok Matet Guem
- Nationality: South Sudanese
- Born: 29 April 1999 (age 27) Yirol, South Sudan
- Height: 189 cm (6 ft 2 in)
- Weight: 65 kg (143 lb)

Sport
- Sport: Track and Field
- Event: 1500m

Achievements and titles
- Personal bests: Outdoor; 800 m: 1:47.41 (Tokyo , 2024) NR; 1500m: 3:36.55. (Osaka 2024) NR; Indoor; 1500 meters: 3:48.82 (Beograd 2022) NR 5000 meters 13:26.02 [Yokohama 2025]NR

Abraham Majok Matet Guem (born 29 April 1999) is a middle-distance runner from South Sudan who specializes in the 1500 metres.

In April 2021, he set a new personal best and national record for the 1500 metres of 3:42.99 at the Komazawa Olympic Park Stadium in Tokyo. He was selected for the 2020 Tokyo Olympics and was given the honour of being a flag bearer for his nation in the opening ceremony.

He competed in the 800 metres at the 2024 Summer Olympics in Paris in August 2024, running a personal best time.

Olympic Games
Preceded by Guor Marial	Flag bearer for South Sudan; Tokyo 2020 with Lucia Moris	Succeeded by Incumbent
