= Lucia Moris =

South Sudan athlete (born 2001)

Personal information
- Full name: Lucia William Moris
- Nationality: South Sudanese
- Born: 23 March 2001 (age 25)

Sport
- Sport: Track and Field
- Events: 100m, 200m

Lucia William Moris (born 23 March 2001) is an athlete from South Sudan who specialises in the 100 and 200 metre races.

== Biography ==
In June 2021, under the universality rule within the Olympic qualifying criteria which allows smaller nations with developing sports programs to send representatives to the competition, she was confirmed as being selected for the delayed 2020 Summer Olympics. In November 2019, prior to the original date of the games, Moris was training in Japan with the South Sudan squad in the city of Maebashi in preparation for the event and was able to stay there and train during the COVID-19 pandemic with the city sponsoring their extended stay. Speaking to Vice, Moris was quoted as saying, “It's very different from home, and I miss my family and friends, but I want to compete at the highest level.” At the games she was given the honour of being a flag bearer for her nation in the opening ceremony.

Moris qualified for the 2024 Summer Olympics in Paris, but did not finish the first preliminary heat of the women's 100m after falling injured during the race.

== Games ==
Game	Discipline/Sports	Team	Event	Venue	As
2024 Summer Olympics	Athletics	SSD(South Sudan)	100m women Olympics	Paris, France	Lucia Moris
2020 Summer Olympics	Athletics	SSD (South Sudan)	200m Women Olympics	Tokyo, Paris	Lucia Moris

Other Participations

Game	Role	NOC	As
2024 Summer Olympics	Flagbearer at the Opening Ceremony	SSD (South Sudan)	Lucia Moris
2020 Summer Olympics	Flagbearer at the Opening Ceremony	SSD (South Sudan)	Lucia Moris

Olympic Games
Preceded by Guor Marial	Flag bearer for South Sudan; Tokyo 2020 with Abraham Guem; Paris 2024 with Kuany Kuany	Succeeded by Incumbent
