= Sudan at the Olympics =

- IOC code: SUD
- NOC: Sudan Olympic Committee
- Medals Ranked 137th: Gold 0 Silver 1 Bronze 0 Total 1

Summer appearances
- 1960; 1964; 1968; 1972; 1976–1980; 1984; 1988; 1992; 1996; 2000; 2004; 2008; 2012; 2016; 2020; 2024; 2028

Other related appearances
- South Sudan (2016–pres.)

Sudan first participated at the Olympic Games in 1960, and has sent athletes to compete in most Summer Olympic Games since then. The nation did not attend the 1964 Games in Tokyo, Japan, boycotted the 1976 Summer Olympics along with most African nations, and participated in the American-led boycott of the 1980 Summer Olympics. The nation has never participated in the Winter Olympic Games.

Ismail Ahmed Ismail, who came second in the men's 800 m in 2008, was the first Sudanese athlete to win an Olympic medal.

The National Olympic Committee for Sudan was created in 1956 and recognized by the International Olympic Committee in 1959.

== Timeline of participation ==
Olympic Year/s	Teams	
1960–1968	Sudan	
1972–2008	Sudan	
2012	Sudan	Independent Olympic Athletes
2016–present	Sudan	South Sudan

== Medal tables ==
=== Medals by Summer Games ===
Games	Athletes	Gold	Silver	Bronze	Total	Rank
1960 Rome	10	0	0	0	0	–
1964 Tokyo	did not participate					
1968 Mexico City	5	0	0	0	0	–
1972 Munich	26	0	0	0	0	–
1976 Montreal	boycotted					
1980 Moscow	boycotted					
1984 Los Angeles	5	0	0	0	0	–
1988 Seoul	8	0	0	0	0	–
1992 Barcelona	6	0	0	0	0	–
1996 Atlanta	4	0	0	0	0	–
2000 Sydney	3	0	0	0	0	–
2004 Athens	5	0	0	0	0	–
2008 Beijing	9	0	1	0	1	70
2012 London	6	0	0	0	0	–
2016 Rio de Janeiro	6	0	0	0	0	–
2020 Tokyo	5	0	0	0	0	–
2024 Paris	4	0	0	0	0	–
2028 Los Angeles	future event					
2032 Brisbane	future event					
Total		0	1	0	1	137

=== Medals by sport ===
Sport	Gold	Silver	Bronze	Total
Athletics	0	1	0	1
Totals (1 entries)	0	1	0	1

== List of medalists ==
Medal	Name	Games	Sport	Event
Silver	Ismail Ahmed Ismail	2008 Beijing	Athletics	Men's 800 metres

== See also ==
- List of flag bearers for Sudan at the Olympics
- Category:Olympic competitors for Sudan
