= Guor Marial =

Sudan-born long-distance runner (born 1984)

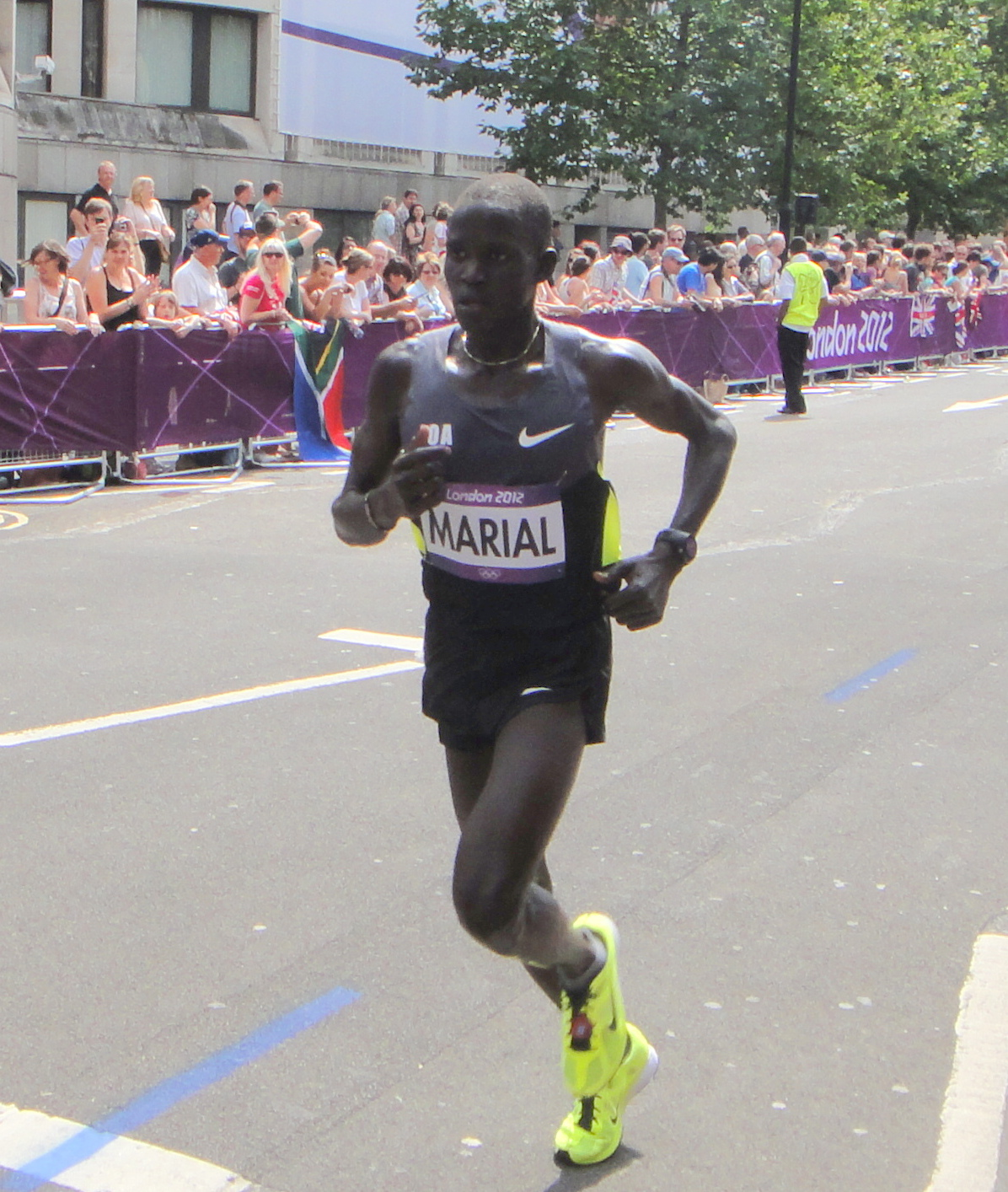
- Guor Marial in the 2012 Summer Olympics Men's marathon in London

Personal information
- Nationality: South Sudanese
- Born: Guor Mading Maker; 15 April 1984 (age 42) Panrieng County, Unity, Sudan (present-day South Sudan)
- Education: Iowa State
- Height: 1.80 m (5 ft 11 in)
- Weight: 60 kg (132 lb)

Sport
- Country: South Sudan
- Sport: Athletics
- Event: Marathon

Achievements and titles
- Olympic finals: 47th (2012); 82nd (2016)
- Personal best: 2:12:55
- Military career
- Maker receives an "Airman's Coin" at the Coin Ceremony February 1, 2018 outside the Pfingston Reception Center at Joint Base San Antonio-Lackland, Texas.
- Allegiance: United States
- Branch: United States Air Force
- Service years: 2018–present
- Rank: Senior Airman
- Unit: 21st Dental Squadron
- Updated on 7 August 2023

Guor Mading Maker (born 15 April 1984), also known as Guor Marial, is a South Sudanese Olympic track and field athlete. He is a Dinka tribesman.

Maker competed in the men's marathon at the 2012 Summer Olympics. Due to the civil war that saw South Sudan split from Sudan, he has refused to compete under the flag of the latter, stating, "It would be betraying my people". He was one of four athletes competing in the 2012 Summer Olympics under the Olympic flag rather than that of an individual country.

Maker competed at the 2016 Summer Olympics for South Sudan, the country's first appearance at an Olympic Games.

A film has been made of his life called Runner.

== Early life ==
Maker left home at the age of seven to live with his uncle in northern Sudan. In 1994, at the age of nine, he fled from a refugee camp during the Sudanese Civil War. While 28 members of his family were killed during the conflict, he was able to escape to Egypt, and then permanently to the United States. He was granted refugee status by the United States when he was 16. Though his parents survived the civil war, at the time of the 2012 Olympics, he had not seen them in 20 years. However, he returned to South Sudan in 2013 and was reunited with his parents. Eight of his brothers and sisters were killed in the war.

He began participating in track and field while attending high school in Concord, New Hampshire, after being encouraged by his gym teacher. He also competed in college at Iowa State, where he was an All-American athlete.

== 2012 Summer Olympics ==
Marial fulfilled the A-qualification standard for the marathon in October 2011, allowing him to participate in the Olympic marathon event at the 2012 Summer Olympics. His case was called "unique" by the IOC, as prior to the games, South Sudan had yet to form a National Olympic Committee and seek full recognition by the International Olympic Committee (IOC), which would have allowed them to send a team and compete under the flag of South Sudan.

Marial holds permanent resident status in the United States, but not citizenship. According to his interview in Runner's World, he applied for naturalization to become a U.S. citizen in 2011 and had his naturalization interview, but his application remains pending: "Technically, I was supposed to be a citizen last June, because I did everything, I did my citizen test, I did my interview, I did my fingerprint, and everything was all set. All I needed to do was go to their office and get my passport and do the ceremony. That was in June 2011, but there has been a security background check...and that's what took everything longer."

The National Olympic Committee of Sudan offered to allow Marial to compete as a member of the Sudanese team, but he rejected this offer, saying, "It's not right for me to do that. It's not right for me to represent the country I refuged from." He went on to say, "If I ran for Sudan, I would be betraying my people. I would be dishonoring the two million people who died for our freedom."

The IOC-executive board announced its decision on 20 July to allow Marial to participate as an Independent Olympic Athlete. However, his travel documentation did not reach him in time, and so he could not march in the opening ceremony on 27 July.

Marial finished 47th in the marathon, with a time of 2:19:32. His personal best is 2:12:55.

In 2013, Marial became a US citizen. He competed at the 2012 Olympics using his adopted name of Marial, which was the surname of his uncle. However, he has since reverted to his birth name.

== 2016 Summer Olympics ==
Marial was selected for the 2016 Olympic Games in the marathon. At the opening ceremony, he was the flag-bearer for South Sudan.

He finished with a season-best of 2:22:45, coming 81st overall.

== Military career ==
Maker became an airman in the United States Air Force on 2 February 2018. He was selected for the United States Air Force World Class Athlete Program. He is currently a dental technician with the 21st Dental Squadron.

Olympic Games
Preceded by First	Flagbearer for South Sudan; 2016 Rio de Janeiro	Succeeded by Lucia Moris; Abraham Guem
