= South Sudan at the Olympics =

- IOC code: SSD
- NOC: South Sudan National Olympic Committee
- Medals: Gold 0 Silver 0 Bronze 0 Total 0

Summer appearances
- 2016; 2020; 2024; 2028

Other related appearances
- Sudan (1960–pres.); Independent Olympic Athletes (2012)

South Sudan first participated at the Olympic Games in 2016, and have competed in every Summer Olympic Games since then. The nation has not competed at the Winter Olympic Games. In their first two Olympics, 2016 and 2020, South Sudan competed only in athletics, but in 2024 they also competed in basketball.

== Timeline of participation ==
Olympic Year/s	Teams	
1960–1968	Sudan	
1972–2008	Sudan	
2012	Sudan	Independent Olympic Athletes
2016–present	Sudan	South Sudan

== History ==
South Sudan was part of Sudan until 2011, when it gained independence after a referendum. Sudan has competed at the Olympics since 1960. Under IOC rules, the South Sudan NOC was not eligible for IOC membership until national sports federations had joined both the NOC and the corresponding international federation of five Olympic sports. Guor Marial competed as an Independent Olympic Athlete at the 2012 Summer Olympics, finishing 47th in the men's marathon. Margret Rumat Rumar Hassan competed as an Independent Olympic Athlete at the 2014 Summer Youth Olympics. By 2015, Sudanese federations were recognised in athletics, basketball, association football, handball, judo, table tennis and taekwondo. The South Sudan NOC was founded by representatives of these sports on 8 June 2015. After a recommendation by its executive board, the IOC admitted the NOC at its session in Kuala Lumpur by acclamation.

== Olympic overview ==
=== 2012 Summer Olympics ===
In 2012, South Sudan was a newly formed country, and had not yet assembled enough national sports federations to satisfy the Olympic requirements to appear as a country; so its athletes instead participated under the flag of Independent Olympic Athletes. Guor Marial competed as an Independent Olympic Athlete at the 2012 Summer Olympics, finishing 47th in the men's marathon.

=== 2016 Summer Olympics ===
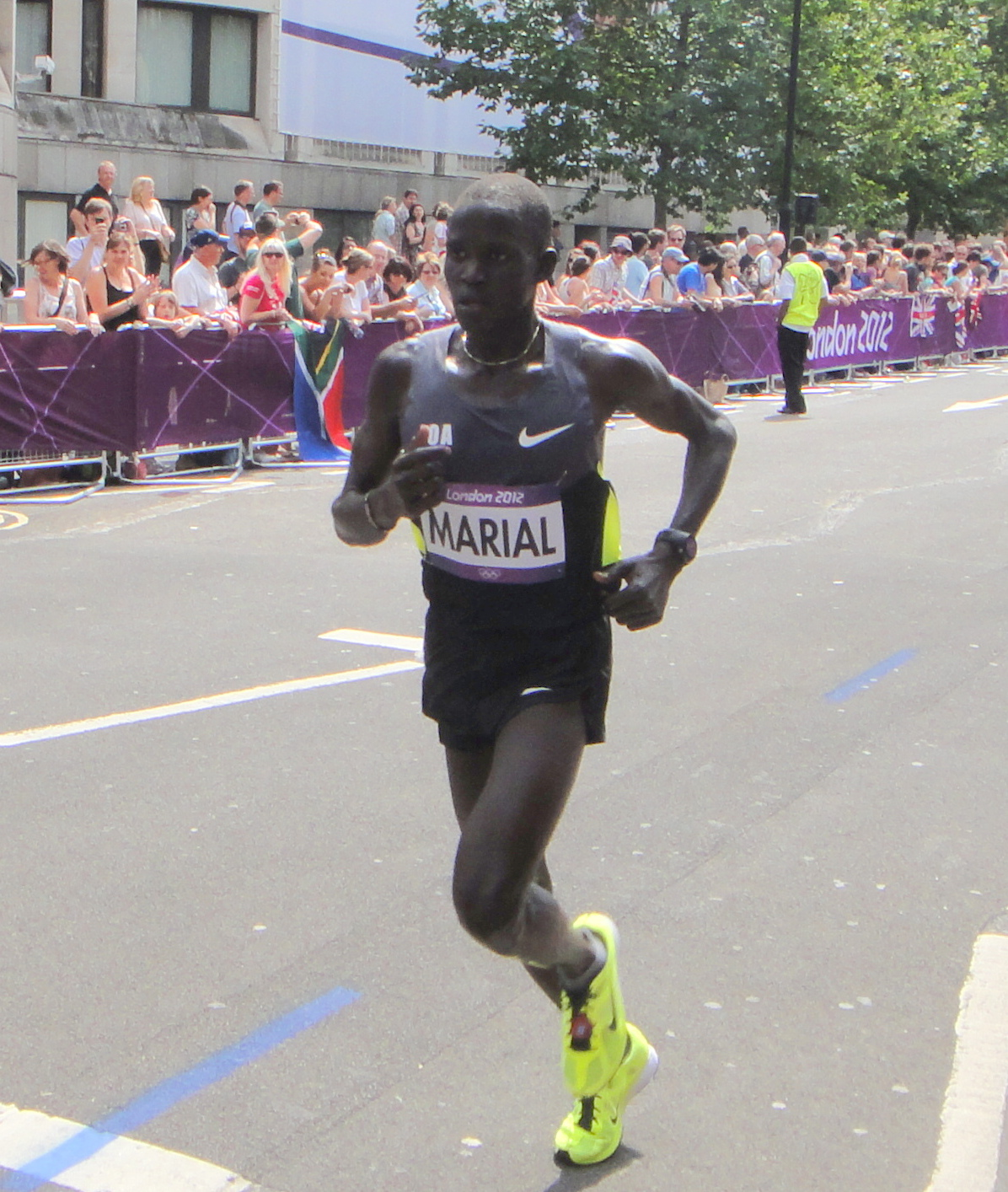
Guor Marial in the 2012 Summer Olympics men's marathon in London

The first year South Sudan competed in the Olympics, they sent three athletes. Santino Kenyi and Margret Hassan participated in the men's 1500 metres and women's 200 metres sprint, respectively. As the men's marathon has only one round, Guor Marial was the only South Sudanese athlete to get to the finals. He placed 82nd with a time of 2:22:45. Kenyi raced in the men's 1500 m and was placed in heat one, which included Matthew Centrowitz Jr. of the United States, the eventual gold medalist. Kenyi himself finished 12th among 14 runners with a time of 3:45.27 and did not advance. Hassan was in the women's 200 m, where she was placed in heat four. This heat contained eventual gold medal-winner Elaine Thompson of Jamaica, although it was won by the Ivory Coast's Marie-Josée Ta Lou. Hassan finished in eighth, which was last in her heat, failing to qualify but setting a new personal best of 26.99.

=== 2020 Summer Olympics ===
South Sudan only sent one male and one female athlete to the 2020 Summer Olympics, Abraham Guem and Lucia Moris. They participated in the men's 800 metres and women's 200 metres. Guem participated in the heats of the men's 1500 metres race in heat one. He finished the race in 13th out of 16 competitors in his heat, with a time 3:40.86, and failed to advance to the semifinals. Moris participated in round one of the women's 200 metres race in heat two. She finished the race in 25.24 seconds, sixth out of seven in her heat, and failed to advance to the semifinals.

=== 2024 Summer Olympics ===
South Sudan sent two athletes in athletics and a basketball team to the 2024 Summer Olympics. The athletics participants were Guem and Moris. They participated in the men's 1500 metres and women's 200 metres, respectively. Guem failed to advance to the semifinals, however he did qualify for the repechage round. Moris did not finish her race, and failed to advance to the first round. The South Sudan men's national basketball team qualified for the men's basketball tournament by being the highest rank from the African zone in 2023 FIBA Basketball World Cup. It was the first time that the nation had qualified for an Olympic basketball competition. They failed to advance to the quarterfinals from the group stage.

== Medal tables ==
=== Medals by Summer Games ===
Games	Athletes	Gold	Silver	Bronze	Total	Rank
1960–2008	as part of Sudan					
2012 London	as part of the Independent Olympic Athletes					
2016 Rio de Janeiro	3	0	0	0	0	–
2020 Tokyo	2	0	0	0	0	–
2024 Paris	14	0	0	0	0	–
2028 Los Angeles	future event					
2032 Brisbane	future event					
Total		0	0	0	0	–

== Flagbearers ==
Summer Olympics
Games	Athlete	Sport
2016 Rio de Janeiro	Guor Marial	Athletics
2020 Tokyo	Abraham Guem	Athletics
2020 Tokyo	Lucia Moris	Athletics
2024 Paris	Kuany Kuany	Basketball
2024 Paris	Lucia Moris	Athletics
