= Sudan Olympic Committee =

National Olympic Committee for Sudan

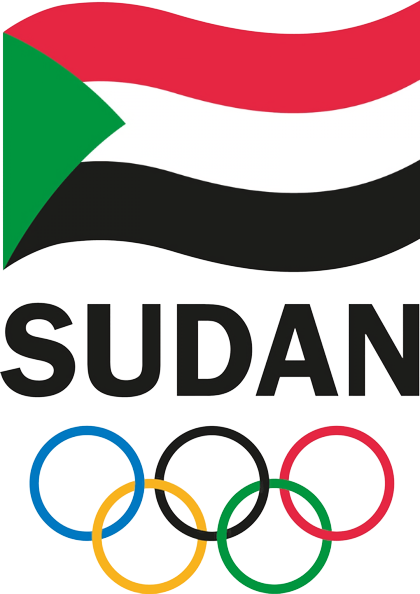
- Country: Sudan
- [[|]]
- Code: SUD
- Created: 1956
- Recognized: 1959
- Continental Association: ANOCA
- Headquarters: International Park; Khartoum
- President: Ahmed Abouelgasim Hashim
- Secretary General: Mahmoud Elsir Mohamed Taha

The Sudan Olympic Committee (Arabic: اللجنة الأولمبية السودانية; IOC code: SUD) is the National Olympic Committee representing Sudan.

== History ==
The Sudanese government has faced scrutiny for claims of interference with the Olympic Committee's operations. In 2024, committee president Elgasim Hashim sought additional resources for the country's athletes in the midst of ongoing regional conflict saying "Despite the extremely dire situation in my country, sport can still play a role in bringing people together." He claimed that their NOC headquarters and athletic infrastructure had been damaged or destroyed in the conflict.

== See also ==
- Sudan at the Olympics
