= Belarus at the 2004 Summer Olympics =

- IOC code: BLR
- NOC: Belarus Olympic Committee
- Website: www.noc.by (in Russian and English)

in Athens
- Competitors: 151 in 22 sports
- Flag bearer: Alexander Medved (coach)
- Medals Ranked 26th: Gold 2 Silver 5 Bronze 6 Total 13

Summer Olympics appearances (overview)
- 1996; 2000; 2004; 2008; 2012; 2016; 2020; 2024

Other related appearances
- Russian Empire (1900–1912); Poland (1924–1936); Soviet Union (1952–1988); Unified Team (1992); Individual Neutral Athletes (2024)

Belarus competed at the 2004 Summer Olympics in Athens, Greece, from 13 to 29 August 2004. This was the nation's fifth appearance at the Summer Olympics in the post-Soviet era. The Belarus Olympic Committee sent a total of 151 athletes to the Games, 82 men and 69 women, to compete in 22 sports.

The Belarusian team featured two defending Olympic champions: discus thrower Ellina Zvereva and single sculls rower Ekaterina Karsten. Along with Zvereva and Karsten, shooters Sergei Martynov, Kanstantsin Lukashyk, and Igor Basinski, and married couple Iryna Yatchenko and Igor Astapkovich competed at their fourth Olympic Games, although they first appeared as part of either the Soviet Union (Martynov and Basinski in 1988) or the Unified Team (Astapkovich, Yatchenko, Lukashyk, and Karsten in 1992). Notable Belarusian athletes featured professional tennis player Max Mirnyi, table tennis star Vladimir Samsonov, gymnast Ivan Ivankov, Russian-born judoka Anatoly Laryukov, and Greco-Roman wrestler Siarhei Lishtvan. Three-time Olympic champion and wrestling coach Alexander Medved became the nation's flag bearer in the opening ceremony.

Belarus left Athens with a total of 13 Olympic medals (2 gold, 5 silver, and 6 bronze), failing only one gold short of the total achieved in Sydney. Three of these medals were awarded to the athletes in weightlifting, and two each in rowing and boxing for the first time. Five Belarusian athletes set the nation's historical record to win Olympic medals for the first time, including judoka Ihar Makarau in the men's half-heavyweight division, track cyclist Natallia Tsylinskaya in the women's time trial, and sprinter Yulia Nestsiarenka, who became the first non-American to claim the Olympic title in the women's 100 metres since 1980.

Originally, Belarus had won a total of fifteen medals at these Games to match its record with Atlanta. On December 5, 2012, hammer thrower Ivan Tsikhan and discus thrower Iryna Yatchenko stripped off their silver and bronze medals respectively as being ordered by the International Olympic Committee, after drug re-testings of their samples were found positive.

== Medalists ==
Medal	Name	Sport	Event	Date
Gold	Ihar Makarau	Judo	Men's 100 kg	August 19
Gold	Yulia Nestsiarenka	Athletics	Women's 100 m	August 21
Silver	Hanna Batsiushka	Weightlifting	Women's 63 kg	August 18
Silver	Ekaterina Karsten	Rowing	Women's single sculls	August 21
Silver	Andrei Rybakou	Weightlifting	Men's 85 kg	August 21
Silver	Viktar Zuyev	Boxing	Heavyweight	August 28
Silver	Magomed Aripgadjiev	Boxing	Light heavyweight	August 29
Bronze	Tatsiana Stukalava	Weightlifting	Women's 63 kg	August 18
Bronze	Natallia Tsylinskaya	Cycling	Women's track time trial	August 20
Bronze	Sergei Martynov	Shooting	Men's 50 m rifle prone	August 20
Bronze	Yuliya Bichyk; Natallia Helakh	Rowing	Women's pair	August 21
Bronze	Viachaslau Makaranka	Wrestling	Men's Greco-Roman 84 kg	August 25
Bronze	Vadzim Makhneu; Raman Piatrushenka	Canoeing	Men's K-2 500 m	August 28

Medals by sport
Sport	1st place, gold medalist(s)	2nd place, silver medalist(s)	3rd place, bronze medalist(s)	Total
Athletics	1	0	0	1
Judo	1	0	0	1
Weightlifting	0	2	1	3
Boxing	0	2	0	2
Rowing	0	1	1	2
Canoeing	0	0	1	1
Cycling	0	0	1	1
Shooting	0	0	1	1
Wrestling	0	0	1	1
Total	2	5	6	13

== Archery ==
Two Belarusian archers (one man and one woman) qualified each for the men's and women's individual archery.

Athlete	Event	Ranking round		Round of 64	Round of 32	Round of 16	Quarterfinals	Semifinals	Final / BM	
Athlete	Event	Score	Seed	Opposition Score	Opposition Score	Opposition Score	Opposition Score	Opposition Score	Opposition Score	Rank
Anton Prylepau	Men's individual	638	45	Fairweather (AUS); W 141–137	Peljor (BHU); W 155–152	Park K-M (KOR); L 166–173	Did not advance			
Hanna Karasiova	Women's individual	588	62	Yun M-J (KOR); L 155–162	Did not advance					

== Athletics ==
Belarusian athletes have so far achieved qualifying standards in the following athletics events (up to a maximum of 3 athletes in each event at the 'A' Standard, and 1 at the 'B' Standard).

On December 5, 2012, hammer thrower Ivan Tsikhan and discus thrower Iryna Yatchenko stripped off their silver and bronze medals respectively as being ordered by the International Olympic Committee, after drug re-testings of their samples were found positive.

Key

- Note–Ranks given for track events are within the athlete's heat only
- Q = Qualified for the next round
- q = Qualified for the next round as a fastest loser or, in field events, by position without achieving the qualifying target
- NR = National record
- N/A = Round not applicable for the event
- Bye = Athlete not required to compete in round

Men
Track & road events

Athlete	Event	Final	
Athlete	Event	Result	Rank
Yevgeniy Misyulya	20 km walk	1:25:10	19
Azat Rakipov	Marathon	DNF	
Andrei Stsepanchuk	50 km walk	3:59:32	19
Andrei Talashko	20 km walk	1:29:36	35
Ivan Trotski	20 km walk	1:25:53	23

Field events

Athlete	Event	Qualification		Final	
Athlete	Event	Distance	Position	Distance	Position
Igor Astapkovich	Hammer throw	76.88	7 q	76.22	9
Yury Bialou	Shot put	20.06	11 q	20.34	5
Leonid Cherevko	Discus throw	57.89	27	Did not advance	
Vadim Devyatovskiy	Hammer throw	76.72	10 q	78.82	4
Aliaksandr Hlavatski	Triple jump	16.18	34	Did not advance	
Vasiliy Kaptyukh	Discus throw	63.04	8 q	65.10	4
Aleksey Lesnichiy	High jump	Disqualified due to doping			
Pavel Lyzhyn	Shot put	19.60	17	Did not advance	
Aliaksandr Malashevich	Discus throw	58.45	23	Did not advance	
Hennazdy Maroz	High jump	2.25	=13	Did not advance	
Andrei Mikhnevich	Shot put	20.11	9 q	20.60	4
Ivan Tsikhan	Hammer throw	80.78	1 Q	~~79.81~~	DSQ
Dmitrij Vaľukevič	Triple jump	16.32	30	Did not advance	

Combined events – Decathlon

Athlete	Event	100 m	LJ	SP	HJ	400 m	110H	DT	PV	JT	1500 m	Final	Rank
Aliaksandr Parkhomenka	Result	11.14	6.61	15.69	2.03	51.04	14.88	41.90	4.80	65.82	4:37.94	7918	20
Aliaksandr Parkhomenka	Points	830	723	832	831	767	864	703	849	826	693	7918	20

Women
Track & road events

Athlete	Event	Heat		Quarterfinal		Semifinal		Final	
Athlete	Event	Result	Rank	Result	Rank	Result	Rank	Result	Rank
Elena Ginko	20 km walk	—N/a						1:30:22	9
Volha Krautsova	5000 m	15:44.01	13	—N/a				Did not advance	
Yulia Nestsiarenka	100 m	10.94 NR	1 Q	10.99	1 Q	10.92 NR	1 Q	10.93	1st place, gold medalist(s)
Natallia Safronnikava	200 m	23.28	4 Q	23.63	8	Did not advance			
Valentina Tsybulskaya	20 km walk	—N/a						1:31:49	15
Ryta Turava	20 km walk	—N/a						1:29:39	4
Sviatlana Usovich	400 m	51.37	2 Q	—N/a		51.42	6	Did not advance	
Aksana Drahun; Yulia Nestsiarenka; Alena Neumiarzhitskaya; Natallia Safronnikava	4 × 100 m relay	43.06	5 q	—N/a				42.94 NR	5
Irina Khlyustova; Natallia Solohub; Ilona Usovich; Sviatlana Usovich	4 × 400 m relay	3:27.36	6	—N/a				Did not advance	

Field events

Athlete	Event	Qualification		Final	
Athlete	Event	Distance	Position	Distance	Position
Nadzeya Astapchuk	Shot put	19.69	1 Q	19.01	3 (without medal)*
Natallia Kharaneka	Shot put	18.52	8 Q	18.96	4
Natallia Safronava	Triple jump	14.52	15 Q	14.22	13
Natallia Shymchuk	Javelin throw	51.23	41	Did not advance	
Maryia Smaliachkova	Hammer throw	65.68	25	Did not advance	
Sviatlana Sudak	Hammer throw	64.42	31	Did not advance	
Volha Tsander	Hammer throw	69.94	9 Q	72.27	6
Iryna Yatchenko	Discus throw	63.04	7 Q	~~66.17~~	DSQ
Ellina Zvereva	Discus throw	60.63	15	Did not advance	

*Nadzeya Astapchuk originally took a fifth place. After a series of doping-related disqualifications she moved up to third place. However as she had been banned for doping offenses since 2004, the IOC decided not to award the bronze medals.

Combined events – Heptathlon

Athlete	Event	100H	HJ	SP	200 m	LJ	JT	800 m	Final	Rank
Natallia Sazanovich	Result	13.73	1.73	DNS	—	—	—	—	DNF	
Natallia Sazanovich	Points	1017	891	0	—	—	—	—	DNF	

== Boxing ==
Belarus entered six boxers in 2004. They won a pair of silver medals, with a combined record of 9-6 in competition. Belarus ranked 6th in the medals chart for boxing.

Athlete	Event	Round of 32	Round of 16	Quarterfinals	Semifinals	Final	
Athlete	Event	Opposition Result	Opposition Result	Opposition Result	Opposition Result	Opposition Result	Rank
Bato-Munko Vankeev	Flyweight	Payano (DOM); L 18–26	Did not advance				
Khavazhi Khatsigov	Bantamweight	López (PUR); W 27–19	Petchkoom (THA); L 18–33	Did not advance			
Mikhail Biarnadski	Featherweight	Ramos (COL); W 32–18	Simion (ROM); L 13–38	Did not advance			
Magomed Aripgadjiev	Light heavyweight	Reducindo (MEX); W 29–10	Muñoz (VEN); W 18–10	Lei Yp (CHN); W 27–18	El Shamy (EGY); W 23–20	Ward (USA); L 13–20	2nd place, silver medalist(s)
Viktar Zuyev	Heavyweight	—N/a	Betti (ITA); W RSC	Vargas (USA); W 36–27	Elsayed (EGY); W WO	Solís (CUB); L 13–22	2nd place, silver medalist(s)
Aliaksandr Apanasionak	Super heavyweight	—N/a	Masikin (UKR); L 5–23	Did not advance			

== Canoeing ==
Belarus sent five canoe teams to Athens. They competed in seven events, earning a bronze medal in the flatwater men's double kayak 500 metre race. This put Belarus in a three-way tie for 17th place in the canoeing medal count.

=== Sprint ===
Men

Athlete	Event	Heats		Semifinals		Final	
Athlete	Event	Time	Rank	Time	Rank	Time	Rank
Aliaksandr Zhukouski	C-1 500 m	1:50.378	4 q	1:50.563	1 Q	1:47.903	4
Aliaksandr Zhukouski	C-1 1000 m	4:02.159	5 q	3:55.456	4	Did not advance	
Aliaksandr Bahdanovich; Aliaksandr Kurliandchyk	C-2 500 m	1:41.576	5 q	1:42.484	3 Q	1:40.858	6
Aliaksandr Bahdanovich; Aliaksandr Kurliandchyk	C-2 1000 m	3:38.391	7 q	3:33.588	4	Did not advance	
Vadzim Makhneu; Raman Piatrushenka	K-2 500 m	1:28.295	1 Q	Bye		1:27.996	3rd place, bronze medalist(s)
Aliaksei Abalmasau; Vadzim Makhneu; Raman Piatrushenka; Dziamyan Turchyn	K-4 1000 m	2:52.170	2 Q	Bye		3:02.419	6

Women

Athlete	Event	Heats		Semifinals		Final	
Athlete	Event	Time	Rank	Time	Rank	Time	Rank
Yelena Bet; Ganna Pushkova-Areshka	K-2 500 m	1:45.279	6 q	1:45.234	3 Q	1:43.729	9

Qualification Legend: Q = Qualify to final; q = Qualify to semifinal

== Cycling ==
=== Road ===
Athlete	Event	Time	Rank
Aliaksandr Usau	Men's road race	Did not finish	
Volha Hayeva	Women's road race	3:33:35	45
Zinaida Stahurskaya	Women's road race	3:25:42	19

=== Track ===
Sprint

Athlete	Event	Qualification		Round 1	Repechage 1	Quarterfinals	Semifinals	Final	
Athlete	Event	Time Speed (km/h)	Rank	Opposition Time Speed (km/h)	Opposition Time Speed (km/h)	Opposition Time Speed (km/h)	Opposition Time Speed (km/h)	Opposition Time Speed (km/h)	Rank
Natallia Tsylinskaya	Women's sprint	11.364; 63.357	2	Meinke (GER); W 11.846; 60.780	Bye	Grankovskaya (RUS); L, L	Did not advance	5th place final Meinke (GER); Krupeckaitė (LTU); Larreal (VEN); W 11.364	5

Pursuit

Athlete	Event	Qualification		Semifinals		Final	
Athlete	Event	Time	Rank	Opponent Results	Rank	Opponent Results	Rank
Vasil Kiryienka	Men's individual pursuit	4:29.005	13	Did not advance			

Time trial

Athlete	Event	Time	Rank
Natallia Tsylinskaya	Women's time trial	34.167	3rd place, bronze medalist(s)

Omnium

Athlete	Event	Points	Laps	Rank
Yauheni Sobal	Men's points race	24	1	12

== Diving ==
Belarusian divers qualified for four individual spots at the 2004 Olympic Games.

Men

Athlete	Event	Preliminaries		Semifinals		Final	
Athlete	Event	Points	Rank	Points	Rank	Points	Rank
Sergei Kuchmasov	3 m springboard	377.61	25	Did not advance			
Aliaksandr Varlamau	3 m springboard	357.09	30	Did not advance			
Andrei Mamontov	10 m platform	338.55	30	Did not advance			
Aliaksandr Varlamau	10 m platform	361.41	27	Did not advance			

== Equestrian ==
=== Dressage ===
Athlete	Horse	Event	Grand Prix		Grand Prix Special		Grand Prix Freestyle		Overall	
Athlete	Horse	Event	Score	Rank	Score	Rank	Score	Rank	Score	Rank
Iryna Lis	Problesk	Individual	67.083	27 Q	66.522	24	Did not advance			

== Fencing ==
Two Belarusian fencers qualified for the following individual spots:

Men

Athlete	Event	Round of 64	Round of 32	Round of 16	Quarterfinal	Semifinal	Final / BM	
Athlete	Event	Opposition Score	Opposition Score	Opposition Score	Opposition Score	Opposition Score	Opposition Score	Rank
Dmitri Lapkes	Individual sabre	Bye	Chen F (CHN); W 15–9	Kaliuzhniy (UKR); W 15–9	Pozdnyakov (RUS); W 15–9	Montano (ITA); L 6–15	Tretiak (UKR); L 11–15	4

Women

Athlete	Event	Round of 32	Round of 16	Quarterfinal	Semifinal	Final / BM	
Athlete	Event	Opposition Score	Opposition Score	Opposition Score	Opposition Score	Opposition Score	Rank
Vita Silchenko	Individual foil	Wuillème (FRA); L 4–15	Did not advance				

== Gymnastics ==
=== Artistic ===
Men

Athlete	Event	Qualification								Final							
Athlete	Event	Apparatus						Total	Rank	Apparatus						Total	Rank
Athlete	Event	F	PH	R	V	PB	HB	Total	Rank	F	PH	R	V	PB	HB	Total	Rank
Ivan Ivankov	Pommel horse	—N/a	9.675	—N/a				9.675	13	Did not advance							
Ivan Ivankov	Rings	—N/a		9.700	—N/a			9.700	13	Did not advance							
Ivan Ivankov	Parallel bars	—N/a				9.762	—N/a	9.762	4 Q	—N/a				9.762	—N/a	9.762	4
Ivan Ivankov	Horizontal bar	—N/a					9.700	9.700	16	Did not advance							
Dzianis Savenkov	All-around	9.512	8.800	9.637	9.500	8.875	7.300	53.624	42	Did not advance							

Women

Athlete	Event	Qualification						Final					
Athlete	Event	Apparatus				Total	Rank	Apparatus				Total	Rank
Athlete	Event	V	UB	BB	F	Total	Rank	V	UB	BB	F	Total	Rank
Yulia Tarasenka	All-around	8.987	7.925	7.837	8.537	33.286	59	Did not advance					

=== Rhythmic ===
Athlete	Event	Qualification						Final					
Athlete	Event	Hoop	Ball	Clubs	Ribbon	Total	Rank	Hoop	Ball	Clubs	Ribbon	Total	Rank
Svetlana Rudalova	Individual	23.925	24.600	24.350	23.050	95.925	10 Q	24.700	25.000	24.125	23.450	97.275	10
Inna Zhukova	Individual	24.575	24.200	25.100	24.700	98.575	8 Q	25.000	25.300	25.200	25.075	100.575	7

Athlete	Event	Qualification				Final			
Athlete	Event	5 ribbons	3 hoops 2 balls	Total	Rank	5 ribbons	3 hoops 2 balls	Total	Rank
Nataliya Aleksandrova; Yenia Burlo; Glafira Martinovich; Zlatislava Nersesyan; Galina Nikandrova; Mariya Poplyko	Team	23.200	22.500	45.700	6 Q	23.500	24.500	48.000	4

=== Trampoline ===
Athlete	Event	Qualification		Final	
Athlete	Event	Score	Rank	Score	Rank
Mikalai Kazak	Men's	52.80	14	Did not advance	
Dmitri Poliaroush	Men's	67.80	5 Q	40.20	4
Tatsiana Piatrenia	Women's	32.90	16	Did not advance	

== Judo ==
Seven Belarusian judoka (six men and one woman) qualified for the 2004 Summer Olympics.

Men

Athlete	Event	Round of 32	Round of 16	Quarterfinals	Semifinals	Repechage 1	Repechage 2	Repechage 3	Final / BM	
Athlete	Event	Opposition Result	Opposition Result	Opposition Result	Opposition Result	Opposition Result	Opposition Result	Opposition Result	Opposition Result	Rank
Siarhei Novikau	−60 kg	Gussenberg (GER); L 0100–1010	Did not advance							
Anatoly Laryukov	−73 kg	Lee W-H (KOR); L 0011–0021	Did not advance			Pedro (USA); L 0000–0001	Did not advance			
Siarhei Shundzikau	−81 kg	Sayidov (UZB); W 1111–0011	Azizov (AZE); L 0001–0010	Did not advance						
Siarhei Kukharenka	−90 kg	Izumi (JPN); L 0000–1000	Did not advance			Iliadis (GRE); W 1021–0000	Costa (ARG); L 0100–1000	Did not advance		
Ihar Makarau	−100 kg	Zhitkeyev (KAZ); W 1010–0010	Peltola (FIN); W 0200–0000	Jikurauli (GEO); W 0011–0001	van der Geest (NED); W 0011–0001	Bye			Jang S (KOR); W 0101–0020	1st place, gold medalist(s)
Yury Rybak	+100 kg	Baccino (ARG); W 1001–0000	Pan S (CHN); W 0210–0000	Suzuki (JPN); L 0010–1011	Did not advance	Bye	Tölzer (GER); L 0000–1000	Did not advance		

Women

Athlete	Event	Round of 32	Round of 16	Quarterfinals	Semifinals	Repechage 1	Repechage 2	Repechage 3	Final / BM	
Athlete	Event	Opposition Result	Opposition Result	Opposition Result	Opposition Result	Opposition Result	Opposition Result	Opposition Result	Opposition Result	Rank
Tatiana Moskvina	−48 kg	Bye	Jossinet (FRA); L 0000–1000	Did not advance		Chervonsky (AUS); W 1000–0000	Gao F (CHN); L 0000–0200	Did not advance		

== Modern pentathlon ==
Three Belarusian athletes qualified to compete in the modern pentathlon event through the European and UIPM World Championships.

Athlete	Event	Shooting (10 m air pistol)			Fencing (épée one touch)			Swimming (200 m freestyle)			Riding (show jumping)			Running (3000 m)			Total points	Final rank
Athlete	Event	Points	Rank	MP Points	Results	Rank	MP points	Time	Rank	MP points	Penalties	Rank	MP points	Time	Rank	MP Points	Total points	Final rank
Dzmitry Meliakh	Men's	186	1	1168	11–20	30	692	2:02.63	5	1332	56	4	1144	9:59.45	15	1004	5340	5
Halina Bashlakova	Women's	156	31	808	14–17	=19	776	2:26.02	18	1168	28	2	1172	11:15.25	16	1020	4944	21
Tatsiana Mazurkevich	Women's	184	2	1144	13–18	=22	748	2:27.64	24	1152	80	10	1120	11:06.21	8	1056	5220	9

== Rowing ==
Belarusian rowers qualified the following boats:

Men

Athlete	Event	Heats		Repechage		Semifinals		Final	
Athlete	Event	Time	Rank	Time	Rank	Time	Rank	Time	Rank
Andrei Pliashkou; Valery Radzevich; Stanislau Shcharbachenia; Pavel Shurmei	Quadruple sculls	5:46.80	3 SA/B	Bye		5:44.70	3 FA	6:09.33	6

Women

Athlete	Event	Heats		Repechage		Semifinals		Final	
Athlete	Event	Time	Rank	Time	Rank	Time	Rank	Time	Rank
Ekaterina Karsten	Single sculls	7:45.22	1 SA/B	Bye		7:31.91	1 FA	7:22.04	2nd place, silver medalist(s)
Yuliya Bichyk; Natallia Helakh	Pair	7:27.73	1 FA	Bye		—N/a		7:09.36	3rd place, bronze medalist(s)
Volha Berazniova; Mariya Brel; Tatsyana Narelik; Mariya Vorona	Quadruple sculls	6:20.72	3 R	6:29.04	6 FB	—N/a		6:54.02	7

Qualification Legend: FA=Final A (medal); FB=Final B (non-medal); FC=Final C (non-medal); FD=Final D (non-medal); FE=Final E (non-medal); FF=Final F (non-medal); SA/B=Semifinals A/B; SC/D=Semifinals C/D; SE/F=Semifinals E/F; R=Repechage

== Sailing ==
Belarusian sailors have qualified one boat for each of the following events.

Women

Athlete	Event	Race											Net points	Final rank
Athlete	Event	1	2	3	4	5	6	7	8	9	10	M*	Net points	Final rank
Tatiana Drozdovskaya	Europe	22	19	19	~~OCS~~	21	5	7	7	20	17	15	152	20

M = Medal race; OCS = On course side of the starting line; DSQ = Disqualified; DNF = Did not finish; DNS= Did not start; RDG = Redress given

== Shooting ==
Nine Belarusian shooters (five men and two women) qualified to compete in the following events:

Men

Athlete	Event	Qualification		Final	
Athlete	Event	Points	Rank	Points	Rank
Igor Basinski	10 m air pistol	580	=11	Did not advance	
Igor Basinski	50 m pistol	554	=15	Did not advance	
Vitali Bubnovich	10 m air rifle	590	=24	Did not advance	
Vitali Bubnovich	50 m rifle 3 positions	1144	=33	Did not advance	
Andrei Kazak	10 m running target	575	9	Did not advance	
Kanstantsin Lukashyk	10 m air pistol	579	=13	Did not advance	
Kanstantsin Lukashyk	50 m pistol	539	37	Did not advance	
Sergei Martynov	50 m rifle prone	596	5 Q	701.6	3rd place, bronze medalist(s)
Sergei Martynov	50 m rifle 3 positions	1152	29	Did not advance	
Yury Shcherbatsevich	50 m rifle prone	591	=24	Did not advance	
Andrei Vasilyeu	10 m running target	569	13	Did not advance	

Women

Athlete	Event	Qualification		Final	
Athlete	Event	Points	Rank	Points	Rank
Yuliya Alipava	10 m air pistol	382	=10	Did not advance	
Yuliya Alipava	25 m pistol	571	25	Did not advance	
Viktoria Chaika	10 m air pistol	380	=16	Did not advance	
Viktoria Chaika	25 m pistol	565	32	Did not advance	

== Swimming ==
Belarusian swimmers earned qualifying standards in the following events (up to a maximum of 2 swimmers in each event at the A-standard time, and 1 at the B-standard time):

Men

Athlete	Event	Heat		Semifinal		Final	
Athlete	Event	Time	Rank	Time	Rank	Time	Rank
Pavel Lagoun	100 m butterfly	53.87	26	Did not advance			
Stanislau Neviarouski	50 m freestyle	23.13	33	Did not advance			
Stanislau Neviarouski	100 m freestyle	50.36	29	Did not advance			
Yahor Salabutau	200 m freestyle	1:53.03	37	Did not advance			

Women

Athlete	Event	Heat		Semifinal		Final	
Athlete	Event	Time	Rank	Time	Rank	Time	Rank
Inna Kapishina	100 m breaststroke	1:10.66	18	Did not advance			
Inna Kapishina	200 m breaststroke	2:31.26	15 Q	DSQ		Did not advance	
Sviatlana Khakhlova	50 m freestyle	25.24	4 Q	25.47	15	Did not advance	
Sviatlana Khakhlova	100 m backstroke	1:03.25	25	Did not advance			
Alena Popchanka	100 m freestyle	55.49	10 Q	54.97	6 Q	55.24	8
Alena Popchanka	200 m freestyle	2:00.67	12 Q	1:59.87	11	Did not advance	
Alena Popchanka	100 m butterfly	59.77	14 Q	58.97	7 Q	59.06	7
Hanna Shcherba	100 m freestyle	56.01	15 Q	55.67	13	Did not advance	
Sviatlana Khakhlova; Iryna Niafedava; Hanna Shcherba; Maryia Shcherba	4 × 100 m freestyle relay	3:45.38	11	—N/a		Did not advance	

== Synchronized swimming ==
Two Belarusian synchronized swimmers qualified a spot in the women's duet.

Athlete	Event	Technical routine		Free routine (preliminary)			Free routine (final)		
Athlete	Event	Points	Rank	Points	Total (technical + free)	Rank	Points	Total (technical + free)	Rank
Khrystsina Markovich; Nastassia Vlasenka	Duet	42.250	19	45.584	84.834	19	Did not advance		

== Table tennis ==
Four Belarusian table tennis players qualified for the following events.

Athlete	Event	Round 1	Round 2	Round 3	Round 4	Quarterfinals	Semifinals	Final / BM	
Athlete	Event	Opposition Result	Opposition Result	Opposition Result	Opposition Result	Opposition Result	Opposition Result	Opposition Result	Rank
Vladimir Samsonov	Men's singles	Bye		Błaszczyk (POL); W 4–2	Leung C Y (HKG); L 3–4	Did not advance			
Viktoria Pavlovich	Women's singles	Bye		Komwong (THA); W 4–2	Boroš (CRO); L 2–4	Did not advance			
Tatyana Kostromina; Viktoria Pavlovich	Women's doubles	Bye		Stefanova / Tan Wl (ITA); L 2–4	Did not advance				
Tatyana Logatzkaya; Veronika Pavlovich	Women's doubles	Bye		Huang I-H / Lu Y-F (TPE); L 3–4	Did not advance				

== Tennis ==
Belarus nominated two male tennis players to compete in both singles and doubles.

Athlete	Event	Round of 64	Round of 32	Round of 16	Quarterfinals	Semifinals	Final / BM	
Athlete	Event	Opposition Score	Opposition Score	Opposition Score	Opposition Score	Opposition Score	Opposition Score	Rank
Max Mirnyi	Men's singles	Chela (ARG); W 3–6, 7–6^{(7–0)}, 6–4	Nieminen (FIN); W 6–3, 6–4	Fish (USA); L 3–6, 6–4, 1–6	Did not advance			
Vladimir Voltchkov	Men's singles	Kiefer (GER); L 2–6, 4–6	Did not advance					
Max Mirnyi; Vladimir Voltchkov	Men's doubles	—N/a	Arazi / El Aynaoui (MAR); W RET	B Bryan / M Bryan (USA); L 3–6, 3–6	Did not advance			

== Weightlifting ==
Eight Belarusian weightlifters qualified for the following events:

Men

Athlete	Event	Snatch		Clean & Jerk		Total	Rank
Athlete	Event	Result	Rank	Result	Rank	Total	Rank
Vitali Dzerbianiou	−56 kg	127.5	3	152.5	6	280	4
Siarhei Laurenau	−69 kg	147.5	=4	170	6	317.5	6
Aliaksandr Anishchanka	−85 kg	170	5	200	=5	370	6
Andrei Rybakou	−85 kg	180	1	200	=5	380	2nd place, silver medalist(s)
Mikhail Audzeyeu	−105 kg	185	=9	215	=9	400	9

Women

Athlete	Event	Snatch		Clean & Jerk		Total	Rank
Athlete	Event	Result	Rank	Result	Rank	Total	Rank
Nastassia Novikava	−53 kg	87.5	=3	102.5	=6	190	5
Hanna Batsiushka	−63 kg	115	1	127.5	2	242.5	2nd place, silver medalist(s)
Tatsiana Stukalava	−63 kg	100	3	122.5	=3	222.5	3rd place, bronze medalist(s)

== Wrestling ==
Key:

- VT - Victory by Fall.
- PP - Decision by Points - the loser with technical points.
- PO - Decision by Points - the loser without technical points.

Men's freestyle

Athlete	Event	Elimination Pool				Quarterfinal	Semifinal	Final / BM	
Athlete	Event	Opposition Result	Opposition Result	Opposition Result	Rank	Opposition Result	Opposition Result	Opposition Result	Rank
Herman Kantoyeu	−55 kg	Zakharuk (UKR); L 1–3 ^{PP}	Orazgaliyev (KAZ); W 3–1 ^{PP}	—N/a	2	Did not advance			15
Murad Haidarau	−74 kg	Abdo (AUS); W 4–0 ^{ST}	Rinella (ITA); W 3–1 ^{PP}	—N/a	1 Q	Saitiev (RUS); L 1–3 ^{PP}	Did not advance	Williams (USA); L 0–5 ^{EV}	DSQ
Siarhei Borchanka	−84 kg	Kurugliyev (KAZ); W 3–1 ^{PP}	Sanderson (USA); L 1–3 ^{PP}	—N/a	2	Did not advance			14
Aleksandr Shemarov	−96 kg	Çakıroğlu (TUR); W 3–1 ^{PP}	Enkhtuyaa (MGL); W 3–0 ^{PO}	—N/a	1 Q	Gatsalov (RUS); L 0–3 ^{PO}	Did not advance		7
Barys Hrynkevich	−120 kg	Ösökhbayar (MGL); L 0–3 ^{PO}	Boyadzhiev (BUL); L 1–3 ^{PP}	Rezaei (IRI); L 0–3 ^{PO}	4	Did not advance			17

Men's Greco-Roman

Athlete	Event	Elimination Pool			Quarterfinal	Semifinal	Final / BM	
Athlete	Event	Opposition Result	Opposition Result	Rank	Opposition Result	Opposition Result	Opposition Result	Rank
Aliaksandr Kikiniou	−74 kg	Sai Yj (CHN); L 1–3 ^{PP}	Bucher (SUI); L 1–3 ^{PP}	3	Did not advance			15
Viachaslau Makaranka	−84 kg	Geghamyan (ARM); W 3–0 ^{PO}	Minguzzi (ITA); W 3–0 ^{PO}	1 Q	Abdelfatah (EGY); W 3–0 ^{PO}	Mishin (RUS); L 0–3 ^{PO}	Yerlikaya (TUR); W 3–1 ^{PP}	3rd place, bronze medalist(s)
Siarhei Lishtvan	−96 kg	Koguashvili (RUS); L 0–3 ^{PO}	Lidberg (SWE); W 5–0 ^{VT}	2	Did not advance			12
Andrei Chekhauskoi	−120 kg	Vála (CZE); L 0–3 ^{PO}	Baroyev (RUS); L 0–3 ^{PO}	3	Did not advance			18

Women's freestyle

Athlete	Event	Elimination Pool			Classification	Semifinal	Final / BM	
Athlete	Event	Opposition Result	Opposition Result	Rank	Opposition Result	Opposition Result	Opposition Result	Rank
Volha Khilko	−63 kg	Legrand (FRA); L 1–3 ^{PP}	Ivanova (TJK); W 3–1 ^{PP}	2	Kartashova (RUS); W 3–1 ^{PP}	Bye	Yanik (CAN); L 1–3 ^{PP}	6

== See also ==
- Belarus at the 2004 Summer Paralympics
