= Rebecca Sattin =

Australian rower

Personal information
- Born: 29 October 1980 (age 45) Honiara
- Years active: 1999-2004

Sport
- Sport: Rowing
- Club: Swan River Rowing Club
Medal record
Women's rowing
Representing Australia
Olympic Games
Bronze medal – third place	2004 Athens	Quadruple sculls
World Rowing Championships
Gold medal – first place	2001 Lucerne	W8+
Gold medal – first place	2002 Seville	W4-
Silver medal – second place	2002 Seville	W8+

Rebecca Sattin (born 29 October 1980 in Honiara) is an Australian rower, a two time World Champion and Olympic medal winner. She had success at the elite world level as both a sculler and a sweep-oared rower.

== Club and state rowing ==
Born in the Solomon Islands but raised in Western Australia, Sattin's senior club rowing was from the Swan River Rowing Club in Perth.

Sattin made her first State representative selection for Western Australia in 1998, stroking the Youth Eight competing for the Bicentennial Cup at the Interstate Regatta within that year's Australian Rowing Championships. She rowed again in the WA representative youth eight in 1999 and 2000. In those crews she rowed with a number of young WA oarswomen who would go on to represent Australia and win World Championship titles including Jo Lutz, Sally Robbins Amber Bradley and Angela Heitman. She rowed in Western Australian senior women's eights contesting the Queen's Cup at Australian Championships on four consecutive occasions from 2002 to 2005.

She raced in composite crews in Swan River Rowing Club colours contesting national titles at the Australian Rowing Championships including the women's eight in 2005.

Sattin was awarded a scholarship to the AIS prior to her 2001 World Championship success.

== International representative rowing ==
In 1999 and still only aged eighteen Sattin was selected to an Australian senior women's four to race at the World Rowing Cup III in Lucerne. They placed third and won a bronze medal. That entire four were selected to the World Rowing U23 Championships that year in Hamburg. Second in their heat, they won the repechage and in the final they were able to win the silver medal. Again in 2000 Sattin figured in a development foursome who raced and won bronze at the World Rowing Cup III and then were selected in toto for that year's U23 World Championships in Copenhagen where they placed sixth.

Sattin was elevated into the Australian senior squad for the 2001 international tour. In their first competitive outing of the 2001 season, racing as an Australian Institute of Sport selection eight at Henley Royal Regatta, Sattin won the 2001 Henley Prize for women's eights (from 2002 this event was renamed the Remenham Challenge Cup). She raced in two Australian boats at the World Rowing Cup IV regatta in Munich Germany. In a coxless pair with Jodi Winter she placed sixth while in the Australian eight they placed second and were on track for possible World Championship success. A month later at the 2001 World Rowing Championships in Lucerne, Sattin was in the six seat of the Australian women's heavyweight crew who won Australia's first ever women's eight World Championship title.

The Australian women's eight stayed together into 2002 with just one seat change. Their European campaign ahead of the World Championships saw them take a bronze medal at the Rowing World Cup II in Lucerne and silver at the Rowing World Cup III in Munich. Sattin also raced in a double scull with Winter in Lucerne and in a coxless four who placed third (with the other half of the eight winning) at Munich. At the 2002 World Championships in Seville Spain, the Australian eight won their heat but were beaten out by the USA by 0.45 seconds in the final. With Sattin seated at six the Australians just held out the Germans and she won her second World Championship placing – a silver. As had occurred in 2001, four members of the 2002 eight including Sattin also doubled up in the coxless four to defend Australia's title. At Seville 2002 with Kristina Larsen in the bow, Victoria Roberts at stroke and Sattin and Winter in the engine room, the Australian girls won their heat and beat Canada in the final to claim another World Championship title – Sattin's second.

Sattin was again in elite Australian crew contention in 2003. She raced in a coxless four and the eight at the World Rowing Cup III in Lucerne and secured her place in the eight for the 2003 World Rowing Championships in Milan. With Sattin in the six seat the eight placed fourth.

At the 2003 World Rowing Championships the Australian women's quad scull coached by Lyall McCarthy had won a World Championship title. Coming into the 2004 Athen Olympics Dana Faletic, Amber Bradley and the young Tasmanian Kerry Hore all held their seats in the quad but Sattin was selected to replace the veteran Jane Robinson. They performed at the Rowing World Cup III in Lucerne and in Athens, got to the Olympic final via a repechage. They were fourth across the line in the final. After the medals had been presented it was discovered that a member of the third-placed Ukrainian crew failed the drugs test and Australia was elevated to the bronze medal position and Rebecca won an Olympic medal in her final Australian representative rowing appearance.

== Surf boats ==
After retiring from still water rowing Sattin took up Surfboat rowing. Between 2008 and 2014 she represented the North Cottesloe Surf Life Saving Club at national Australian championships in Open Female and Open Mixed surfboat events.
