= Amber Bradley =

Australian rower (born 1980)

Personal information
- Born: 19 May 1980 (age 46) Wickham, Western Australia, Australia
- Years active: 1995–2008

Sport
- Sport: Rowing
- Club: Perth Rowing Club
Medal record
Women's rowing
Representing Australia
Olympic Games
Bronze medal – third place	2004 Athens	W4x
World Rowing Championships
Gold medal – first place	2003 Milan	W4x
Gold medal – first place	2006 Eton	W4-
Bronze medal – third place	2005 Gifu	W2x
Bronze medal – third place	2006 Eton	W8+

Amber Bradley (born 19 May 1980 in Wickham, Western Australia) is an Australian former rower - a six time Australian national sculling champion, a two time World Champion, dual Olympian and an Olympic medal winner. She won her World Championships in both sculling and sweep-oared boat classes.

== Club and state rowing ==
Bradley was educated at Penrhos College, Perth where she took up rowing. She won the national Schoolgirl Scull title at the Australian Rowing Championships in 1997.

She was first selected to represent Western Australian, age fifteen, in the 1996 youth eight competing for the Bicentennial Cup at the Interstate Regatta within the 1996 Australian Rowing Championships. From 1997 she was competing for Australia in crewed sculls but was still eligible for state youth eight selection as late as 2000 and she raced again in Western Australian youth eights at Australian Championships in 1999 and 2000.

Bradley's senior rowing was done from the Edith Cowan University Perth Rowing Club.

She was selected in representative Western Australian senior women's eights competing for the Queen's Cup in the Interstate Regatta at the Australian Championships on seven consecutive occasions between 2000 and 2007. She stroked those eights in 2004, 2006 and 2007. From 2001 to 2006 she was also Western Australia's senior sculling representative contesting the Nell Slatter Trophy at those same Australian championships. She won the single sculls championship in 2001, 2003 and 2004.

In ECU Perth Rowing Club colours she contested national titles at the Australian Championships on a number of occasions. She won the U19 single sculls title in 1996 and the U23 single sculls titles in 1999 (racing for the AIS). From 2002 to 2004 she was the Open Australian singles sculls champion and she also raced in that event in 2005, 2007 and 2008.

== International representative rowing ==
Aged 16 Amber was selected as the Australian junior single sculls contestant for the 1997 World Rowing Junior Championships in Hazewinkel. She fought through the preliminary rounds with a second in the heat and a third place in the semi. However she raced a perfect final, leading at every mark and by 4 seconds at the 1500 m. She saw off a strong finish from the French sculler to take the gold and win her first World Championship.

In 1998, she was selected in a development quad who competed at the Rowing World Cup III at Lucerne. At the World Rowing U23 Championships in Ioannina, Greece she raced in a double scull with Jess Morrison and finished eighth. In 1999, she figured in Australian senior squads and was picked in the quad scull who represented at the 1999 World Rowing Championships in St Catharines' who struggled to an eleventh-place finish. In 2001, she was selected in the quad scull to race at the World Rowing U23 Championships in Linz, Austria where she won another under age World Championship title. She also raced in quads at two World Rowing Cups in Europe that year.

In 2002, Bradley secured a seat at stroke in the Australian women's quad scull with Donna Martin, Sally Robbins and Dana Faletic. They raced at the 2002 World Rowing Cup III in Munich and then went to Seville 2002. They were slow in their heat but won the repechage to make the final and finished fourth overall.

The 2003 World Rowing Championships were the main Olympic qualification regatta and the Australian women scullers trained in Canberra under Lyall McCarthy. Faletic and Bradley held their seats in the quad with the experienced Jane Robinson and the young Tasmanian Kerry Hore added to the crew. The quad performed well in the lead up winning at the World Rowing Cup III in Lucerne. At the 2003 World Championships in Milan they won their heat in an impressive time. They sculled the final to perfection leading at every mark. At the 1500m they had an unbeatable 3.45 second margin and finished more than 2 seconds ahead of Bulgaria. The quad won the gold and Bradley at stroke claimed her first senior World Championship title.

The World Champion quad with Jane Robinson replaced by Rebecca Sattin were still together for the 2004 Athen Olympics. They were fourth across the line in the final. After the medals had been presented it was discovered that a member of the third-placed Ukrainian crew failed the drugs test and Australia was elevated to the bronze medal position and Amber won her only Olympic medal.

In 2005, Bradley rowed consistently in the Australian double scull with Queenslander Sally Kehoe who was at the beginning of her own stellar career. They placed at two World Rowing Cups that year and then won the bronze at the 2005 World Rowing Championships in Gifu, Japan.

In 2006, Bradley switched from sculls to sweep-oared boats at the national representative level. She raced in a coxless pair and in the Australian women's senior eight at the World Rowing Cups I and II in Munich and Poznan. She was in the three seat of both the eight and the four for the 2006 World Rowing Championships at Eton, Dorney. The eight took the bronze and in the four with Jo Lutz, Robyn Selby Smith and Kate Hornsey, Bradley won the gold and her second senior World Championship title.

In 2007, Bradley was sculling again and raced in the Australian quad at a World Rowing Cup and then in a double-scull with Kerry Hore who placed ninth at Munich 2007. Her final Australian appearances were in the Olympic year 2008 when she raced in the quad at two World Rowing Cups ahead of final role in the two seat of that boat who finished sixth in the final at Beijing 2008.
