= Dana Faletic =

Australian rower

Personal information
- Born: 1 August 1977 (age 48)
- Years active: 1995–2012

Sport
- Sport: Rowing
- Club: Huon Rowing Club; Lindisfarne Rowing Club

Achievements and titles
- Olympic finals: 2004 Athens W4X; London 2012 W4X
Medal record
Women's rowing
Representing Australia
Olympic Games
Bronze medal – third place	2004 Athens	W4X
World Rowing Championships
Gold medal – first place	2003 Milan	W4X
Silver medal – second place	2006 Eton	W4X

Dana Faletic (born 1 August 1977 in Hobart) is an Australian former champion, national representative, World Champion and dual-Olympian rower. Her international representative success was as a sculler, though she represented her state of Tasmania in sculls and in sweep-oared boats.

== Club and state rowing ==
Faletic was educated at Claremont College (Tasmania) where she took up rowing. She won the national Schoolgirl Scull title at the Australian Rowing Championships in 1994 and 1995.

Her senior rowing was initially from the Huon Rowing Club and later the Lindisfarne Club, both in Tasmania.

Faletic first represented her state of Tasmania in the women's youth eight of 1995 who competed for the Bicentennial Cup in the Interstate Regatta at the Australian Rowing Championships. In 2001, 2002, 2004, 2005 and 2006 she was Tasmania's single sculls representative to race the Nell Slatter Trophy at the Interstate Regatta. She won that Australian national title in 2002 beating out West Australia's Amber Bradley by 0.02 seconds and she won again in 2006 taking and holding a commanding lead off the start. In 2003, 2005 and 2006 she was selected in Tasmania's women's eight to race the Queen's Cup at the Australian Championships.

In club colour's Faletic also raced the open women's single sculls title at Australian Rowing Championships from 2001 to 2006 and in 2012. She won that Australian Championship title in 2001 and 2006 and placed second in 2002, 2003 and 2004.

== International representative rowing ==
Faletic made her international representative debut in 1995, at the World Rowing U23 Championships in Groningen, The Netherlands as Australia's single sculls entrant. She placed sixth. That same year she raced the single scull at the World Rowing Junior Championships in Poznan, Poland. At the 1995 U23 World Championships in Hazewinkel, she rowed in the double scull with Anna Tree from South Australia and they finished fifth.

Faletic didn't represent for Australia at the senior level until 2001 when she was selected in a double scull with Monique Heinke. They raced at that year's World Rowing Cup IV in Munich and then went to the 2001 World Rowing Championships in Lucerne where they finished eighth.

In 2002 Faletic broke into the Australian women's quad scull with Donna Martin, Sally Robbins and Amber Bradley. They raced at the 2002 World Rowing Cup III in Munich and then went to Seville 2002. They were slow in their heat but won the repechage to make the final and finished fourth overall.

The 2003 World Rowing Championships were the main Olympic qualification regatta and the Australian women scullers trained in Canberra under Lyall McCarthy. Faletic and Bradley held their seats in the quad with the experienced Jane Robinson and the young Tasmanian Kerry Hore added to the crew. The quad performed well in the lead up winning at the World Rowing Cup III in Lucerne. At the 2003 World Championships in Milan they won their heat in an impressive time. They sculled the final to perfection leading at every mark. At the 1500m they had an unbeatable 3.45 second margin and finished more than 2 seconds ahead of Bulgaria. The quad won the gold and Faletic in the two seat claimed her sole World Championship title.

The World Champion quad with Jane Robinson replaced by Rebecca Sattin were still together for the 2004 Athen Olympics. They were fourth across the line in the final. After the medals had been presented it was discovered that a member of the third-placed Ukrainian crew failed the drugs test and Australia was elevated to the bronze medal position and Dana won her only Olympic medal.

Faletic took a year off after the Olympics but was back for Australian national selection in 2006. She raced at the 2006 World Rowing Cupp II at Poznan in both a double scull (who took silver) and the quad. She was picked in the quad to compete at the 2006 World Rowing Championships with Sonia Mills, Catriona Sens-Oliver and Sally Kehoe. They won the silver and Faletic had her third World Championship medal.

Faletic gave the sport away in 2006 but made a comeback in 2011 aged 34 and remarkably made the 2012 Australian Olympic Team. She was selected again to the quad to row with Hore, Pauline Frasca and Amy Clay. The crew finished second in their heat and won the repechage to make the final. They were sitting fourth at each 500m mark and the finish line, coming in just behind the USA crew who claimed bronze, with Ukraine winning gold and Germany claiming silver. It marked the end of Faletic's accomplished rowing career.
