= Tetiana Kolesnikova =

Ukrainian rower (born 1977)

Medal record

Women's rowing

Representing Ukraine

Olympic Games
Disqualified	2004 Athens	Quadruple sculls

World Rowing Championships
Gold medal – first place	2009 Poznań	W4x

European Rowing Championships
Gold medal – first place	2007 Poznań	W4x
Gold medal – first place	2008 Marathon	W4x
Gold medal – first place	2009 Brest	W4x
Gold medal – first place	2011 Plovdiv	W4x

Tetiana Mykolaïvna Kolesnikova (Ukrainian: Тетяна Миколаївна Колеснікова;born 9 August 1977 in Mykolaiv) is a Ukrainian rower. At the 2004 Olympics she was disqualified with her team after one of her teammates, Olena Olefirenko, tested positive for ethamivan.
