= Frances Houghton =

British rower

Frances Houghton MBE
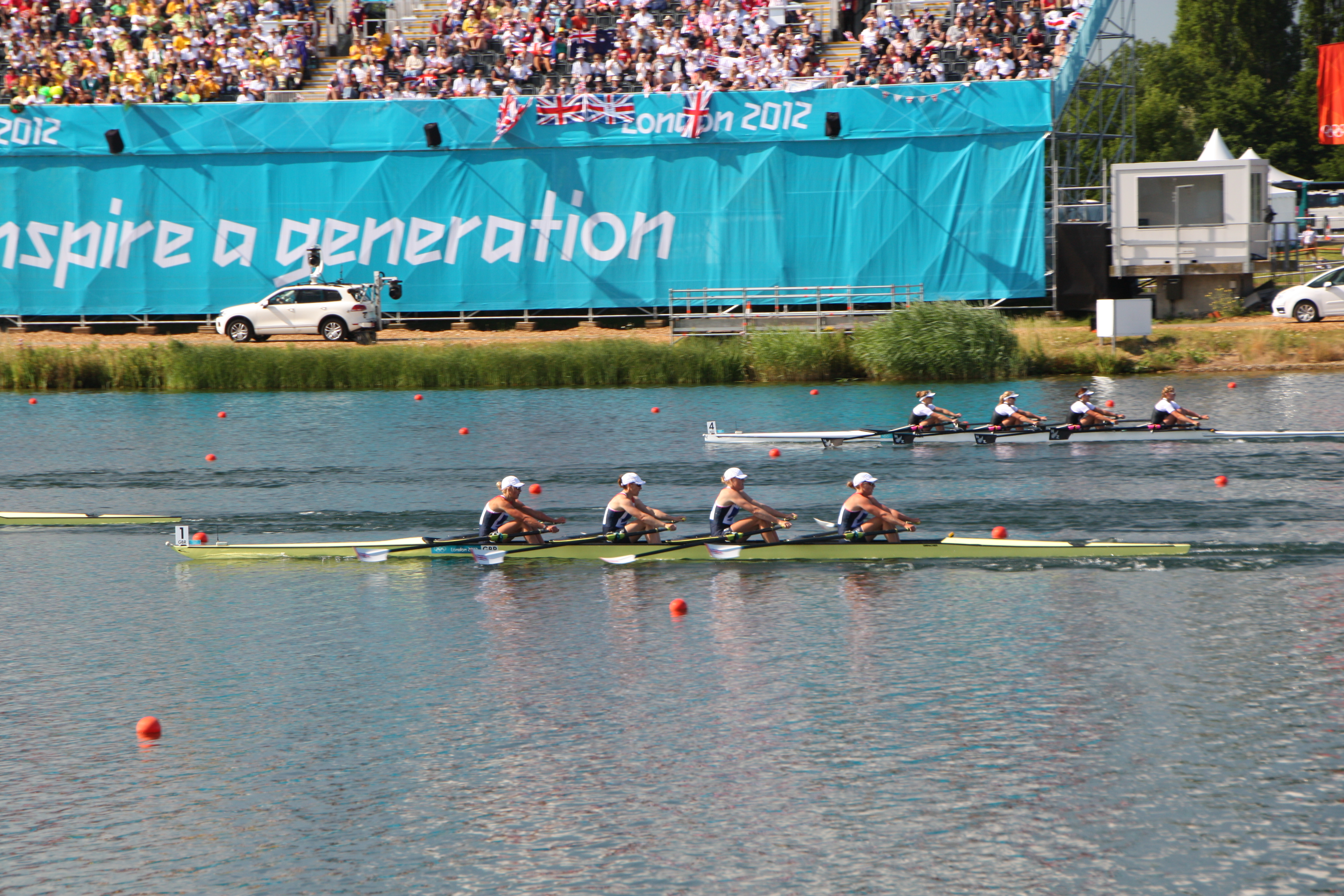
- Houghton in the Quadruple scull at the 2012 Summer Olympics

Personal information
- Full name: Frances Julia P. Houghton
- Nationality: British
- Born: 19 September 1980 (age 46) Oxford, England
- Education: King's College London
- Height: 6 ft 3 in (1.91 m)

Sport
- Country: Great Britain
- Sport: Rowing
- Partners: Debbie Flood – 1998, 1999; Sarah Winckless – 2000; Debbie Flood – 2001, 2002; Winckless, Mowbray, Laverick – 2003; Mowbray, Flood, Romero – 2004; Romero, Winckless, Grainger – 2005; Flood, Winckless, Grainger – 2006; Grainger, Flood, Vernon – 2007, 2008; Flood, Rodford, Vernon – 2010; Wilson, Flood, Rodford – 2012; Victoria Meyer-Laker – 2013
Medal record
Women's rowing
Representing Great Britain
Olympic Games
Silver medal – second place	2004 Athens	Quad scull
Silver medal – second place	2008 Beijing	Quad scull
Silver medal – second place	2016 Rio de Janeiro	Eight
World Rowing Championships
Gold medal – first place	2005 Gifu	Quad scull
Gold medal – first place	2006 Eton	Quad scull
Gold medal – first place	2007 Munich	Quad scull
Gold medal – first place	2010 Karapiro	Quad scull
Nations Cup
Gold medal – first place	1999 Hamburg	W2x
World Junior Indoor Championships
Gold medal – first place	1999 Boston	Ergo
British Junior Indoor Championships
Gold medal – first place	1998 Birmingham	Ergo

Frances Houghton is a former British rower who mentors elite athletes and works as a professional chef.

== Early life ==
Houghton was born in Oxford and started her rowing at the Dragon School before moving to The King's School, Canterbury, making her Junior International debut in 1995. She graduated from King's College London in 2003 with a BA in Hispanic Studies, having taken a sabbatical to prepare for the Sydney Olympics.

== Rowing career ==
Houghton was the first British woman to be selected for five Olympic Games in rowing and retired on the Olympic podium in 2016 as part of the first British Women's Eight to win an Olympic medal, and as the longest-serving member of the British Rowing Team.

Alongside her Olympic medals (Athens 2004; Beijing 2008; Rio 2016), World titles (2005; 2006; 2007; 2010) and 2016 European Gold, she held two world records during her career.

=== Early years ===
Houghton won Britain's first Junior women's sculling medal along with partner Debbie Flood, a Bronze Medal at the 1998 World Junior championships in the Double sculls at Ottensheim, Austria.

In November she won the junior title at the British Indoor Rowing Championships, where she set a new junior British record. She was also the first Junior girl to break both the 7-minute and 6-minute 50 seconds barriers on the ergometer.

In 1999, Houghton and Flood won Gold in the Double sculls at the World Under-23 Championships, Britain's first sculling medal at this level.

In February, she became the World Junior Indoor Rowing Champion at the championships in Boston, USA.

=== 2000–2009 ===
Houghton won the GB Rowing Senior Trials (2000–04).

Houghton and Sarah Winckless finished ninth in the double sculls at the 2000 Summer Olympics in Sydney, Australia. At the 2001 World Rowing Championships in Lucerne, she finished seventh in the double sculls with Debbie Flood.

Whilst living and working in Seville as part of her degree course, she competed in the 2002 World Rowing Championships, finishing fourth in the double sculls with Flood.

Houghton finished fourth in the quadruple scull at the 2003 World Rowing Championships at Idroscalo, Milan, Italy, partnered with Winckless, Alison Mowbray, and Elise Laverick.

Houghton won gold medals in the 2004 World Rowing Cups at both Lake Malta Poznań, Poland, and Rotsee Lucerne, Switzerland, partnered with Alison Mowbray, Flood and Rebecca Romero – the first British women's quad to beat the Germans in this event. At the Athens Olympic Games, she won a silver medal in the quadruple sculls, beaten by the German boat. She was teamed with Alison Mowbray, Flood, and Romero.

In 2005, Houghton moved to the 3 seat of the GB women's quadruple scull, where she won the first of her four world championships. She was partnered with Romero, Winckless, and Katherine Grainger. They won gold medals at the World Rowing Cups at both Eton Dorney and Munich, plus a silver medal in Lucerne. At the World Rowing Championships in Japan that September, they won gold.

In the 2006 World Rowing Cup series, Houghton was teamed with Flood, Winckless, and Grainger in the quadruple sculls. They achieved a clean sweep of gold medals at Poznan, Munich and Lucerne. Later that year, Houghton won the second of her four world championships in the GB women's quadruple scull, partnered with Flood, Winckless, and Grainger. Initially, they finished second to the Russian crew at Eton Dorney, who were then retrospectively disqualified in 2007 for drug offences.

In the 2007 World Rowing Cup series, the quadruple scull team of Houghton, Grainger, Flood, and Annabel Vernon won gold at Linz, silver at Amsterdam and gold at Lucerne, thus winning the overall quad title for the series, and then became World Champion for the third time in the quad. At the 2007 World Rowing Championships in Munich, Houghton won the third of her four world titles in the GB women's quadruple scull, partnered with Grainger, Flood, and Vernon.

In the 2008 World Rowing Cup series, Houghton, Grainger, Flood, and Vernon won Gold in Munich and bronze in Lucerne. At the Beijing Summer Olympics, Houghton, Grainger, Flood, and Vernon won silver after being overhauled by the Chinese crew in the last couple of hundred meters of the race.

=== 2010 onwards ===
Having had a year off in 2009, Houghton returned in 2010 to take her fourth World Championship Gold in the women's quadruple sculls at Lake Karapiro, New Zealand, this time with Flood, Vernon, and Beth Rodford.

At the 2012 Olympic Games in London, the women's quadruple scull team of Houghton, Flood, Rodford, and Melanie Wilson finished 6th.

In 2013, she teamed up with Victoria Meyer-Laker in the double sculls, taking Bronze in the World Rowing Cup at Penrith Lakes in Sydney, Australia, followed in June by Gold at Eton Dorney, London. At the third round in Lucerne, they finished fourth. In July 2013 at the Henley Royal Regatta, she teamed up with Polly Swann, Victoria Meyer-Laker, and Helen Glover to win the Princess Grace Challenge Cup for women's quadruple scull. Competing as Leander Club and Minerva Bath Rowing Club, they completed the final course in 6 minutes 59 seconds.

In 2016, competing in her 5th Olympic Games at Rio, Houghton won a silver medal in the Women's Eight.

Having retired from competitive rowing in 2016, Houghton was awarded an MBE in the 2018 New Year's Honours List for 'services to rowing'.

In 2021, Houghton published Learnings From Five Olympic Games, a book exploring her 21-year rowing career.

== Professional chef ==
Houghton took time out of her sporting career in 2009 to train as a Chef at Ballymaloe Cookery School in Ireland.
