= Julia Wilson =

Australian rower

Personal information
- Born: 23 September 1978 (age 48)
- Years active: 1998-2006

Sport
- Sport: Rowing
- Club: UTS Haberfield Rowing Club
Medal record
Women's rowing
Representing Australia
World Rowing Championships
Gold medal – first place	2001 Lucerne	W4-
Gold medal – first place	2001 Lucerne	W8+
Silver medal – second place	2002 Seville	W8+

Julia Wilson (born 23 September 1978 in Sydney) is an Australian former rower, a two-time World Champion and a dual Olympian.

== Club and state rowing ==
Wilson's senior rowing was from the UTS Haberfield Rowing Club in Sydney.

Wilson rowed in state representative eights for New South Wales contesting the Interstate women's eight championship for the ULVA Trophy and later the Queen Elizabeth II Cup. She represented her state each year from 2000 to 2004 and rowed to victories in 2002, 2003 and 2004.

She was awarded a scholarship to the AIS prior to her 2001 World Championship success.

== International rowing career ==
Wilson made her first Australian representative appearance at the 1999 World Rowing U23 Championships in Hamburg. She raced in the Australian quad scull who finished sixth. The next year at the 2000 Sydney Olympics Wilson rowed in the Australian women's quad scull, finishing in seventh place.

Wilson made the Australian squad for the 2001 international tour. In their first competitive outing of the 2001 season, racing as an Australian Institute of Sport selection eight at Henley Royal Regatta, Wilson won the 2001 Henley Prize for women's eights (from 2002 this event was renamed the Remenham Challenge Cup). Wilson was then selected in two Australian senior crews for the Rowing World Cup IV regatta in Munich Germany. The coxless four won that regatta and the Australian eight placed second but were on track for possible World Championship success. A month later at the 2001 World Rowing Championships in Lucerne, Switzerland Wilson rowed at three in the Australian women's heavyweight crew stroked by Kristina Larsen to win Australia's first ever women's eight World Championship title. With their excellent pre-Championship form Wilson doubled-up with Jo Lutz, Jane Robinson and Victoria Roberts in the coxless four and also won gold. Wilson came home in 2001 as a dual World Champion and a member of the first Australian crew to win the women's eight event at Henley.

With just one seat change the Australian women's eight stayed together into 2002. Their European campaign ahead of the World Championships saw them take a bronze medal at the Rowing World Cup II in Lucerne and silver at the Rowing World Cup III in Munich. At the 2002 World Championships in Seville Spain, the Australian eight won their heat but were beaten out by the USA by 0.45 seconds in the final. The Australians with Wilson again in the three seat just held out the Germans and Wilson won her fourth World Championship placing - a silver.

Wilson was again in elite Australian crew contention in 2003. She raced in a coxless four and the eight at the World Rowing Cup III in Lucerne and secured her place in the eight for the 2003 World Rowing Championships in Milan. With Wilson in the bow seat the eight placed fourth.

For the 2004 Olympics Wilson was seated at five in the Australia's women's eight in Athens. In the Olympic final, the crew were fighting for a bronze medal with 400 metres to go when Sally Robbins sitting in front of Wilson at six collapsed, lying back onto Wilson's runners and preventing her from coming forward to take a stroke. The boat finished sixth and last in the final. It was Wilson's last Australian representative appearance.

== Olympics ==
- 2000, Quad, 7th place
- 2004, Eight, 6th place

== World Rowing Championships ==
- 2001, Four, 1st place
- 2001, Eight, 1st place
- 2002, Eight, 2nd place
- 2003, Eight, 4th place
