= Rowing at the 2004 Summer Olympics – Women's quadruple sculls =

Women's quadruple sculls at the Games of the XXVIII Olympiad

Medalists
1st place, gold medalist(s)		Kathrin Boron; Meike Evers; Manuela Lutze; Kerstin El Qalqili	Germany
2nd place, silver medalist(s)		Alison Mowbray; Debbie Flood; Frances Houghton; Rebecca Romero	Great Britain
3rd place, bronze medalist(s)		Dana Faletic; Rebecca Sattin; Amber Bradley; Kerry Hore	Australia

These are the results of the Women's quadruple sculls competition, one of six events for female competitors in Rowing at the 2004 Summer Olympics in Athens.

== Quadruple Sculls women ==
Gold:	Silver:	Bronze:
Germany; Kathrin Boron; Meike Evers; Manuela Lutze; Kerstin El Qalqili	Great Britain; Alison Mowbray; Debbie Flood; Frances Houghton; Rebecca Romero	Australia; Dana Faletic; Rebecca Sattin; Amber Bradley; Kerry Hore

== Heat 1 - August 15, 09:40 ==
1. Great Britain: Alison Mowbray, Debbie Flood, Frances Houghton and Rebecca Romero 6:15.60 -> Final A
2. Russia: Oksana Dorodnova, Anna Sergeyeva, Larisa Merk, Yuliya Levina 6:17.72 -> Repechage
3. Belarus: Mariya Vorona, Volha Berazniova, Tatsyana Narelik, Mariya Brel 6:20.72 -> Repechage
4. Ukraine: Olena Morozova, Olena Olefirenko, Yana Dementyeva, Tetiana Kolesnikova 6:21.24 -> Repechage

== Heat 2 - August 15, 09:47 ==
1. Germany: Kathrin Boron, Meike Evers, Manuela Lutze, Kerstin El Qalqili 6:16.49 -> Final A
2. United States: Michelle Guerette, Hilary Gehman, Kelly Salchow, Danika Holbrook 6:18.63 -> Repechage
3. Australia: Dana Faletic, Rebecca Sattin, Amber Bradley, Kerry Hore 6:23.46 -> Repechage
4. Denmark: Dorthe Pedersen, Sarah Lauritzen, Christina Rindom, Majbrit Nielsen 6:28.16 -> Repechage

== Repechage - August 18, 11:00 ==
1. Russia: Oksana Dorodnova, Anna Sergeyeva, Larisa Merk, Yuliya Levina 6:23.13 -> Final A
2. Ukraine: Olena Morozova, Olena Olefirenko, Yana Dementyeva, Tetiana Kolesnikova 6:24.64 -> Final A
3. Australia: Dana Faletic, Rebecca Sattin, Amber Bradley, Kerry Hore 6:24.67 -> Final A
4. United States: Michelle Guerette, Hilary Gehman, Kelly Salchow, Danika Holbrook 6:25.39 -> Final A
5. Denmark: Dorthe Pedersen, Sarah Lauritzen, Christina Rindom, Majbrit Nielsen 6:25.41 -> Final B
6. Belarus: Mariya Vorona, Volha Berazniova, Tatsyana Narelik, Mariya Brel 6:29.04 -> Final B

== Final A - August 22, 09:30 ==
Rank	Rowers	Country	Time
Gold medal	Kathrin Boron, Meike Evers, Manuela Lutze, Kerstin El Qalqili	Germany	6:29.29
Silver medal	Alison Mowbray, Debbie Flood, Frances Houghton, Rebecca Romero	Great Britain	6:31.26
Bronze medal	Dana Faletic, Rebecca Sattin, Amber Bradley, Kerry Hore	Australia	6:34.73
4	Oksana Dorodnova, Anna Sergeyeva, Larisa Merk, Yuliya Levina	Russia	6:36.49
5	Michelle Guerette, Hilary Gehman, Kelly Salchow, Danika Holbrook	United States	6:39.67
DSQ	Olena Morozova, Olena Olefirenko, Yana Dementyeva, Tetiana Kolesnikova	Ukraine	6:34.31

The Ukrainian crew was disqualified after Olena Olefirenko tested positive for ethamivan.

== Final B - August 21, 11:40 ==
Rank	Rowers	Country	Time
1	Dorthe Pedersen, Sarah Lauritzen, Christina Rindom, Majbrit Nielsen	Denmark	6:50.13
2	Mariya Vorona, Volha Berazniova, Tatsyana Narelik, Mariya Brel	Belarus	6:54.02
