= Alison Mowbray =

British rower

Personal information
- Nationality: British
- Born: 1 February 1971 (age 55) Derby, England
- Height: 181 cm (5 ft 11 in)
- Weight: 72 kg (159 lb)
Medal record
Women's rowing
Representing Great Britain
Olympic Games
Silver medal – second place	2004 Athens	Quadruple sculls

Alison Mowbray (born 1 February 1971) is a British former rower who won a silver medal at the 2004 Summer Olympics competing in the women's quadruple scull.

== Rowing career ==
Mowbray rowed for the Liverpool University and Polytechnic Boat Club and the Cambridge University Women's Boat Club (CUWBC). While at Cambridge she rowed in the 1994 and 1995 Boat Races and served as CUWBC President in 1995.

Mowbray took part in two Olympic Games, winning a silver medal, and five World Rowing Championships. In 2000 she rowed in the single sculls event but only qualified for the B Final, finishing fourth. In 2004, she earned her place in the national team in the GB trials and was assigned to the quadruple sculls for the upcoming World Rowing Cup and Olympics, joining the other top four finishers Debbie Flood, Frances Houghton and Rebecca Romero. The quartet won gold in the first and third regattas and silver at the Olympics.

== Personal life ==
Mowbray graduated with first-class honours from the University of Liverpool and completed her PhD in molecular biology at the University of Cambridge, where she was a member of Gonville and Caius College. After her second Boat Race, she put her rowing career on hold in order to finish her doctorate.

In her autobiography Gold Medal Flapjack, Silver Medal Life, Mowbray described herself as an "unlikely" Olympian who had grown up excelling in music rather than sports. She only took up rowing seriously while at university.

Mowbray qualified as a teacher at Roehampton Institute and taught chemistry at Wycombe High School. At the time of the 2004 Olympics, she was the second schoolteacher in Team GB to earn a medal at the games.
