= Rindom =

Rindom is a surname. Notable people with the surname include:

- Anne-Marie Rindom (born 1991), Danish sailor
- Christina Rindom (born 1973), Danish rower
- Jessie Rindom (1903–1981), Danish film actress
- Svend Rindom (1884–1960), Danish screenwriter and film actor
