= Victoria Roberts (rower) =

Australian rower

Personal information
- Born: 10 March 1978 (age 48)
- Years active: 1992–2007

Sport
- Sport: Rowing
- Club: UTS Haberfield Rowing Club
Medal record
Women's rowing
Representing Australia
Gold medal – first place	2001 Lucerne	W8+
Gold medal – first place	2001 Lucerne	W4-
Gold medal – first place	2002 Seville	W4-
Silver medal – second place	2002 Seville	W8+
Bronze medal – third place	2007 Munich	W4-

Victoria Roberts (born 10 March 1978 in London) is an Australian former rower, a dual Olympian, and a three-time world champion. She went back-to-back winning the coxless four World Championship title in 2001 and 2002.

== Club and state rowing ==
Roberts' senior rowing was done from the UTS Haberfield Rowing Club in Sydney. She was awarded a scholarship to the AIS prior to her 2001 World Championship success.

Roberts rowed in state representative eights for New South Wales contesting the Interstate women's eight championship for the ULVA Trophy and later the Queen Elizabeth II Cup at the Australian Rowing Championships. She represented her state in 1999, 2006 and consecutively from 2001 to 2004, rowing to victories in the seven seat in 2002, 2003 and 2004.

She raced in UTS Haberfield colours in composite crews contesting national titles at the Australian Rowing Championships in 2007 (W4- and W2-).

== International rowing career ==
=== World Championships ===
Roberts was first considered for Australian representative honours when she was selected in the coxless four who placed third at the World Rowing Cup III in Lucerne in 1999. She was not picked in the pair or the eight for that year's Senior World Championships in St Catharine's but was selected for the U23 World Championships in Hamburg where she won a silver medal in a coxless four with Rebecca Sattin, Deidre Coates and Angela Heitman.

In 2000 she made the Australian women's eight who won bronze at two World Rowing Cups in the lead up to the Olympics. For the 2000 Sydney Olympics she rowed in the eight who had a credible fifth placing in the final.

Roberts was selected in the Australian squad for the 2001 international tour. In their first competitive outing of the 2001 season, racing as an Australian Institute of Sport selection eight at Henley Royal Regatta, Roberts won the 2001 Henley Prize for women's eights (from 2002 this event was renamed the Remenham Challenge Cup). She was then selected in two Australian senior crews for the World Rowing Cup IV regatta in Munich Germany. The coxless four won that regatta and the Australian eight placed second but were on track for possible World Championship success. A month later at the 2001 World Rowing Championships in Lucerne, Roberts rowed at seven in the Australian women's heavyweight crew stroked by Kristina Larsen to win Australia's first ever women's eight World Championship title. With their excellent pre-Championship form Roberts doubled-up with Jo Lutz, Julia Wilson and Jane Robinson in the coxless four and also won gold. Roberts came home from Switzerland as a dual World Champion and a member of the first Australian crew to win the women's eight event at Henley.

With just one seat change the Australian women's eight stayed together into 2002. Their European campaign ahead of the World Championships saw them take a bronze medal at the Rowing World Cup II in Lucerne and silver at the Rowing World Cup III in Munich. At the 2002 World Championships in Seville Spain, the Australian eight won their heat but were beaten out by the USA by 0.45 seconds in the final. The Australians with Roberts again in the seven seat just held out the Germans and Roberts won her third World Championship placing – a silver. As in 2001 four members of the eight also doubled up in the Australian coxless four with Roberts the only rower returning from the 2001 World Champion foursome to defend their title. At Seville 2002 with Roberts at stroke in front Rebecca Sattin, Jodi Winter and Kristina Larsen the Australian girls won their heat and beat Canada in the final to claim another World Championship title – Roberts' third.

Roberts held her place leading the bow side in the Australian women's heavyweight crews in 2003. She raced in a coxless four and the eight at the World Rowing Cup III in Lucerne and secured her place in the eight for the 2003 World Rowing Championships in Milan. With Roberts in the seven seat the eight placed fourth.

She took a break after the 2004 Olympics but Roberts was back in elite Australian crew contention in 2007. She raced in the eight at the World Rowing Cup I in Linz and in the coxless four at the World Rowing Cup II in Amsterdam and secured her place in the four for the 2007 World Rowing Championships in Munich. Roberts at stroked the four to a 3rd place, a bronze medal and her final World Championship placing.

=== Olympics ===
In only her second year of national representative rowing Roberts made the squad for the Australian women's eight in the 2000 Olympic year. She raced in the eight at both World Rowing Cup events II and III contested in Europe. Come Sydney 2000 Roberts had secured her bow seat in the VIII. Only the heat winners were automatically through to the final and Australia finished theirs in second behind the eventual gold medallists Romania. They finished third in the repechage and won a finals berth in which they rowed credibly, beating both their qualifying times and holding out the US crew for fifth place in Roberts' hometown Olympics.

For the 2004 Olympics Roberts was seated at seven in the Australia's women's eight in Athens. In the Olympic final, the crew were fighting for a bronze medal when in the 3rd 500m Sally Robbins seated at six behind Roberts, began to lose consciousness. With 400 metres to go Robbins collapsed, lying back onto Julia Wilson's runners and preventing Julia from coming forward to take a stroke. The Australian eight finished sixth and last in the final and post-regatta, endured a higher level of scrutiny and enquiry than any previous Australian rowing representatives.
