= Kerry Hore =

Australian rower

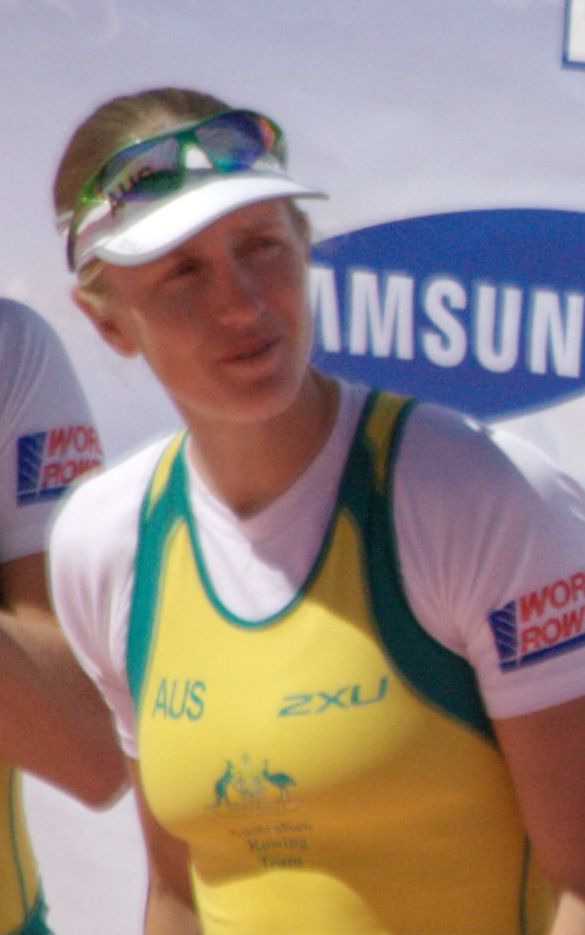
- Kerry Hore in 2010

Personal information
- Born: 3 July 1981 (age 45) Hobart, Tasmania
- Height: 183 cm (72 in)
- Weight: 74 kg (163 lb)

Achievements and titles
- National finals: Queens Cup 8 times Nell Slatter Trophy 8 times
Medal record
Women's rowing
Representing Australia
Olympic Games
Bronze medal – third place	2004 Athens	Quadruple sculls
World Rowing Championships
Gold medal – first place	2003 Milan	Quad scull
Silver medal – second place	2010 Karapiro	Double scull
Silver medal – second place	2011 Bled	Double scull
- Updated on 15 May 2018

Kerry Hore (born 3 July 1981) is an Australian former rower, a national champion, world-champion and four-time Olympian who competed in the women's quadruple sculls at the 2004, 2008, 2012 and 2016 Summer Olympics. She was in Australian quad sculls which won a 2003 World Championship and a bronze medal at the Athens Olympics.

== Personal ==
Born in Hobart, Tasmania, Hore attended Mt Stuart Primary, Ogilvie High School and The Friends' School in Hobart. She obtained a BPharmacy from the University of Tasmania and works as a pharmacist in Bellerive.

== Club and national career ==
Hore's senior rowing was from the New Norfolk Rowing Club and the Huon Rowing Club in southern Tasmania. Later in Hobart she rowed from the Lindisfarne Rowing Club. Hore consistently represented for her state at the Interstate Regatta within the Australian Rowing Championships. In the thirteen-year period 2003 to 2015 she raced for Tasmania on four occasions in the senior women's eight contesting the Queen Elizabeth Cup and on eight occasions she sculled for the Nell Slatter Cup. She rowed in both boats at the 2003, 2007 and 2008 championships.

On seven occasions from 2007 to 2014 she competed in New Norfolk colours for the Australian national single sculls title at the Australian Rowing Championships. She placed second in four of those races and finally won that Australian championship title racing in Huon Rowing Club colours in 2014. In 2011 she won she Australian national quad scull title in an Australian selection composite crew.

== International career ==
Hore won gold and the world title at the 2003 World Rowing Championships in Milan rowing in a quad scull with Jane Robinson, Dana Faletic and Amber Bradley. At the 2004 Athens Olympics with Faletic, Bradley and Rebecca Sattin, Hore won the bronze medal in the women's quad.

At Beijing 2008 and London 2012, Hore was in women's quads who progressed through to finals. They finished in sixth place in 2008 and fourth in 2012.

Hore teamed with Kim Crow to win silver medals in the women's double scull at the 2010 and 2011 World Rowing Championships. At the 2010 World Rowing Championships in Lake Karapiro she also raced in the Australian quad scull to a fourth placing.

In Rio 2016 Hore was selected in a crew with Jennifer Cleary, Jessica Hall and Madeleine Edmunds to row the Australian women's quad scull. They finished outside the places in their heat of the Olympic regatta and were eliminated in the repechage. Hore nonetheless became the first Australian female rower to compete at four Olympic Games.
