= Iryna Niafedava =

Belarusian swimmer

Personal information
- Full name: Iryna Mikailauna Niafedava
- National team: Belarus
- Born: 1 August 1987 (age 38) Minsk, Belarusian SSR, Soviet Union
- Height: 1.82 m (6 ft 0 in)
- Weight: 60 kg (132 lb)

Sport
- Sport: Swimming
- Strokes: Freestyle

Iryna Mikailauna Niafedava (Belarusian: Ірына Міхайлаўна Няфёдава; born August 1, 1987) is a Belarusian former swimmer, who specialized in freestyle events. Niafedava qualified for the women's 4×100 m freestyle relay, as a member of the Belarusian team, at the 2004 Summer Olympics in Athens. Teaming with Sviatlana Khakhlova, and sisters Hanna and Maryia Shcherba in heat two, Niafedava swam a third leg and recorded a split of 56.46, but the Belarusians missed the top 8 final by 2.5 seconds, sharing a fifth-place tie and eleventh overall with the Brazilians in a final time of 3:45.38.
