= Melanie Wilson (rower) =

British rower

Personal information
- Born: 25 June 1984 (age 42)

Sport
- Country: Great Britain
- Sport: Women's rowing
- College team: Imperial College Boat Club
Medal record
Olympic Games
Silver medal – second place	2016 Rio de Janeiro	W8+

Melanie Wilson (born 25 June 1984) is a British rower who competed for the GB rowing team. At the 2012 Summer Olympics, she competed in the Women's quadruple sculls. At the 2016 Summer Olympics she won a silver medal in the women's eight.

== Biography ==
Born in Southampton, Wilson spent her early years in Japan and Hong Kong before moving to the UK in 2002 to take an honours degree in Biochemistry and Genetics at the University of Nottingham. She was educated at Island School in Hong Kong. After graduating she spent 6 months in Kilifi, Kenya working on research into malaria under the KEMRI-Wellcome Trust Research Programme. In 2007, she completed a master's degree in Biochemical Engineering at UCL before enrolling in Imperial College London to sit for a post-graduate degree in medicine. After she was selected to join the GB Rowing team she suspended her medical studies in 2010 to focus on competing for a place in a GB boat in the London 2012 Olympics. Following the London Olympics she resumed her medical studies and withdrew from full-time competitive rowing in September 2013. She graduated in July 2014 and returned to full-time rowing with the aim of competing at the 2016 Rio de Janeiro Olympics. Initially selected for the GBRowing quadruple sculls she was moved into the eight in early 2016 and selected to compete in this boat class at Rio de Janeiro in June 2016. She retired from international rowing after the Rio de Janeiro Olympics to continue her medical career.

== Career ==
=== 2011 ===
In Munich at the first World Cup of 2011 Wilson, in the absence of injured Anna Watkins, raced with Katherine Grainger in the women's double and won a gold medal, with clear water between them and the boats of USA and Belarus in silver and bronze positions respectively. Wilson moved into the women's quadruple scull for the Lucerne World Cup, where she won a silver medal.

At 2011 World Rowing Championships in Bled, Slovenia, Wilson raced in the women's quadruple scull with crewmates Debbie Flood, Beth Rodford and Annabel Vernon, finishing 7th. This was sufficient to qualify the boat for the 2012 London Olympics but a below form finish and a result which Wilson described as 'the biggest disappointment of my life'.

=== 2012 ===
At the 2012 GB Rowing Team Senior Trials held on 10/11 March at Eton/Dorney, Wilson finished 5th in the women's single scull. She was subsequently selected to race in the quadruple scull at the Belgrade World Cup in May 2012. In the lead up to the 2012 London Olympics Wilson then competed in the World Cup quadruple scull races at Lucerne and Munich.

At the 2012 London Olympics at Dorney Lake, Eton Wilson raced with Debbie Flood, Frances Houghton and Beth Rodford in the GB quadruple sculls boat. The boat qualified for the A Final but failed to deliver a competitive performance in the finals and finished outside the medals in 6th place.

=== 2013 ===
In 2013 Wilson raced in a single scull at the Eton Dorney World Cup, where she won the B Final, then in the Women's Eight at Lucerne, finishing fourth, and again in the Women's Eight at the World Championships in South Korea where the boat finished fourth.

=== 2014 ===
In October 2014 Wilson, rowing with Emma Twigg from New Zealand, won the 2014 British Rowing Senior Championships double sculls at Nottingham.

In November 2014 Wilson won the Wingfield Sculls on the River Thames.

=== 2015 ===
On 14 March 2015 Wilson was part of the composite crew that won the Women's Eights Head of the River Race on the River Thames in London, setting a time of 18:58.6 for the 4 1/4-mile (6.8 km) Championship Course from Mortlake to Putney. The crew comprised: Heather Stanning – Army RC; Helen Glover – Minerva-Bath RC; Zoe Lee – Imperial College BC; Katherine Grainger – Marlow RC; Melanie Wilson; Caragh McMurtry – Southampton Coalporters ARC; Olivia Carnegie-Brown – Oxford Brookes University BC; Jessica Eddie – London RC; cox Phelan Hill – Leander Club.

Wilson competed in the GBRowing women's quadruple sculls through the 2015 World Rowing regatta program. The boat's best performance came at the European Rowing Championship event at Poznan in Poland where it finished fourth in the A Final.

At the Olympic qualifying World Championship event at Aiguebelette, France the boat could only manage a 2nd place in the B Finals and therefore failed to qualify for the 2016 Rio de Janeiro Olympics.

=== 2016 ===
Wilson moved into the GBRowing Women's 8 boat in 2016. In the run up to the 2016 Rio de Janeiro Olympics the crew achieved successive podium finishes at Brandenburg (European Championship – Gold medal), Lucerne (World Cup – Silver medal) and Poznan (World Cup – Silver medal). In June 2016 Wilson was selected to row in the GB women's eight at the 2016 Rio de Janeiro Olympics. She won a silver medal in the women's eight at the 2016 Summer Olympics.

== World Rowing results ==
Event	Venue	Class	Race	Position / Time	Medal
2016 Olympic Games	Rodrigo de Freitas Lagoon, Rio de Janeiro, Brazil	W8+	Final A	2nd 06:03.98	Silver
2016 World Cup	Poznan Malta, Poland	W8+	Final A	2nd 06:08.25	Silver
2016 World Cup	Lucerne Rotsee, Switzerland	W8+	Final A	2nd 06:01.95	Silver
2016 European Championships	Brandenburg, Germany	W8+	Final A	1st 06:51.46	Gold
2015 World Championships	Aiguebelette, France	W4x	Final B	2nd 06:21.94
2015 World Cup	Lucerne Rotsee, Switzerland	W4x	Final A	6th 06:29.6
2015 World Cup	Varese, Italy	W4x	Final B	1st 06:22.24
2015 European Championships	Poznan Malta, Poland	W4x	Final A	4th 06:21.07
2013 World Championships	Chungju Tangeum Lake, Korea	W8+	Final A	4th 06:11.80
2013 World Cup	Lucerne Rotsee, Switzerland	W8+	Final A	4th 06:04.84
2013 World Cup	Eton Dorney Lake, Great Britain	W1x	Final B	1st 07:39.64
2012 Olympic Games	Eton Dorney Lake, Great Britain	W4x	Final A	6th 06:51.54
2012 World Cup	Munich Oberschleissheim, Germany	W4x	Final A	3rd 06:37.57	Bronze
2012 World Cup	Lucerne Rotsee, Switzerland	W4x	Final A	5th 06:23.73
2012 World Cup	Belgrade Sava, Serbia	W4x	Final A	3rd 06:25.23	Bronze
2011 World Championships	Lake Bled, Slovenia	W4x	Final B	1st 06:30.33
2011 World Cup	Lucerne Rotsee, Switzerland	W4x	Final A	2nd 06:35.28	Silver
2011 World Cup	Munich Oberschleissheim, Germany	W2x	Final A	1st 06:57.52	Gold
2010 World Cup	Lake Bled, Slovenia	W1x	Final B	3rd 07:52.52
2009 World Championships	Poznan Malta, Poland	W8+	Final A	5th 06:12.66
