= Hilary Gehman =

American rower

Medal record

Women's rowing

Representing United States

World Rowing Championships
| Bronze medal – third place | 2001 Lucerne | W4x |

Hilary Gehman (born August 15, 1971 in Shirley, Massachusetts) is an American rower. She competed in women's quadruple sculls at the 2000 Summer Olympics and the 2004 Summer Olympics.
