= Kelly Salchow =

American rower

Kelly Salchow (born October 5, 1973 in Cincinnati, Ohio) is an American rower. She competed in women's quadruple sculls at the 2000 Summer Olympics and the 2004 Summer Olympics.
