= Musical Story =

- Russian: Музыкальная история
- Directed by: Aleksandr Ivanovsky; Gerbert Rappaport
- Written by: Georgi Munblit; Yevgeni Petrov
- Starring: Sergei Lemeshev; Zoya Fyodorova; Nikolai Konovalov; Erast Garin; Anatoly Korolkevich; Anna Sergeyeva; Leontina Dyomina
- Cinematography: Arkadi Koltsaty; Mikhail Rotinov
- Edited by: N. Razumova
- Music by: Lev Shvarts
- Release date: 1940
- Running time: 84 minute
- Country: Soviet Union
- Language: Russian

Musical Story (Russian: Музыкальная история, romanized: Muzykalnaja istorija) is a 1940 Soviet musical comedy film directed by Aleksandr Ivanovsky and Gerbert Rappaport.

The film told a love story with the music of five operas: Bizet's Carmen, Tchaikovsky's Eugene Onegin, Rimsky-Korsakov's May Night, Borodin's Prince Igor and Flotow's Martha.

== Plot ==
The film tells about the taxi driver Petya Govorkov, who rehearses Lensky's role in the local opera house. His talents are highly appreciated by the elderly singer and conductor Makedonsky, but because Petya leaves to study at the conservatoire, he quarrels with his girlfriend. On his opening night she hears him singing on the radio, and they are reconciled.

== Cast ==
- Sergei Lemeshev as Petya Govorkov
- Zoya Fyodorova as Klava Belkina
- Nikolai Konovalov as Maestro Makedonsky (as N. Konovalov)
- Erast Garin as Cabbie Tarahkanov
- Anatoly Korolkevich as Pankov (Cabbie singing 'Onegin')
- Anna Sergeyeva as Natenka (Cabbie singing 'Olga')
- Leontina Dyomina as Nanny (uncredited)

== Memory's Harvest ==
In 1947 T. O. McCreadie and his brother Alec arranged for it to be dubbed into English by Australian actors after it was released under the title Memory's Harvest.

It was the first feature-length Continental film to have its dialogue translated by people in Australia.

=== Reception ===
The Sydney Daily Telegraph said "The technical work was done by Embassy Pictures under the direction of the McCreadie Brothers, who are to be congratulated on their achievement. A foreign film becomes more intelligible and enjoyable when presented in the language of the country in which it is shown."

The Sydney Morning Herald thought "the Australian dialogue is a notable technical achievement" although felt April Ledie "occasionally sounds too much like a debutante for the proletarian role of the film."

Smith's Weekly said "the film realist will find it a refreshing change after the synthetic glamor of the Hollywood musical. However, if you regard pictures as a way of escape from a hum drum existence you won't like it at all. It will remind you too much of your own daily life." The critic added "The dubbing-in of English dialogue has been most skilfully-handled... I would congratulate particularly Peter Finch for his masterly speaking of the hero's part."

=== Australian cast ===
- Peter Finch
- Queenie Ashton
- Ben Lewin
- John Fernside
- April Ledis
