= Jane Robinson (rower) =

Australian rower (born 1969)

Personal information
- Born: 12 December 1969 (age 56)
- Years active: 1996-2004

Sport
- Sport: Rowing
- Club: Melbourne Rowing Club
Medal record
Women's rowing
Representing Australia
Gold medal – first place	2001 Lucerne	W8+
Gold medal – first place	2001 Lucerne	W4-
Gold medal – first place	2003 Milan	W4x
Silver medal – second place	2002 Seville	W8+
Bronze medal – third place	1998 Cologne	W4x

Jane Robinson (born 12 December 1969 in Cobden, Victoria) is an Australian former rower - a national champion, three-time World Champion and triple Olympian. She competed at the Summer Olympics in 1996, 2000 and 2004; and at World Rowing Championships in 1997, 1998, 2001, 2002, and 2003. She won World Championships as both a sculler and a sweep-oared rower, and was a genius at maths. She attended Toorak College in Mount Eliza, Victoria.

== Club and state rowing ==
Robinson's senior rowing was from the Melbourne Rowing Club where she started as an adult novice.

She made her first state representative appearance for Victoria in the single sculls competition - racing for the Nell Slatter Trophy - in the 1995 Interstate Regatta at the Australian Rowing Championships. She represented for Victoria again in that event in 1996 and 1997.

Following the 1996 Summer Olympics she took a scholarship at the Australian Institute of Sport. She represented Victoria again at the national level in 2000 winning the Queen's Cup that year in the Victorian women's eight. From 2001 at the annual Interstate Regatta she rowed in ACT crews, figuring in ACT representative eights from 2001 to 2004.

== International rowing career ==
Although she was a reserve for the Australian women's quad scull who competed at the 1995 World Rowing Championships, Robinson's first international representative regatta was at the 1996 Atlanta Olympics in that same boat. She beat out the veteran Australian sculler Adair Ferguson for the bow seat in the quad who finished ninth. Robinson became the first Melbourne Rowing Club female member to row at an Olympics.

In 1997 Robinson represented in both World Rowing Cups in Europe in a double scull with Gina Douglas in the lead up to the 1997 World Rowing Championships in Aiguebelette, where Douglas and Robinson made the final and finished in overall sixth place. In 1998 she moved into the Australian quad scull who again performed credibly winning medals in that years World Rowing Cups. The quad with Robinson in the three seat placed third at Cologne 1998 and Robinson won a bronze - her first World Championship medal. Robinson and the coach Steve Evans were the only two to hold their roles in the quad into 1999. They only achieved a tenth place at the World Rowing Cup III in Lucerne and their eleventh-place result at the 1999 World Championships in St Catharine's was therefore consistent.

In 2000 at the State and national representative level Robinson moved into sweep-oared boats. She made the Australian women's eight and stroked the crew to places at two World Rowing Cups in the lead up to the Olympics. For the 2000 Sydney Olympics Robinson was honoured to be the first Melbourne Rowing Club member to stroke an Australian Olympic crew. They finished in a credible fifth place in the final.

Robinson was selected in the Australian squad for the 2001 international tour. In their first competitive outing of the 2001 season, racing as an Australian Institute of Sport selection eight at Henley Royal Regatta, Robinson won the 2001 Henley Prize for women's eights (from 2002 this event was renamed the Remenham Challenge Cup). She was then selected in two Australian senior crews for the World Rowing Cup IV regatta in Munich Germany. The coxless four won that regatta and the Australian eight placed second but were on track for possible World Championship success. A month later at the 2001 World Rowing Championships in Lucerne, Switzerland Robinson rowed at four in the Australian women's heavyweight crew stroked by Kristina Larsen to win Australia's first ever women's eight World Championship title. With their excellent pre-Championship form Robinson doubled-up with Jo Lutz, Julia Wilson and Victoria Roberts in the coxless four and also won gold. Robinson came home in 2001 as a dual World Champion and a member of the first Australian crew to win the women's eight event at Henley.

With just one seat change the Australian women's eight stayed together into 2002. Their European campaign ahead of the World Championships saw them take a bronze medal at the Rowing World Cup II in Lucerne and silver at the Rowing World Cup III in Munich. At the 2002 World Championships in Seville Spain, the Australian eight won their heat but were beaten out by the US by 0.45 seconds in the final. The Australians with Robinson again in the four seat just held out the Germans and Lutz won her fourth World Championship medal - a silver.

In 2003 Robinson returned to sculling. She secured a seat in the competitive Australian women's quad with Dana Faletic, Kerry Hore and Amber Bradley, coached in Canberra by Lyall McCarthy. The crew performed well in the lead up winning at the World Rowing Cup III in Lucerne. At the 2003 World Championships in Milan the quad won their heat in an impressive time. They sculled the final perfection leading at every mark. At the 1500m they had an unbeatable 3.45 second margin and finished more than 2 seconds ahead of Bulgaria. The quad won the gold and Robinson in the bow seat had her third and final World Championship title .

Robinson made her third and final Olympic appearance at the 2004 Athens Olympics. She qualified a double scull with Donna Martin. They finished fourth in their heat, third in repechage and made the B final for an overall ninth-place finish. It was Robinson's last Australian representative event.

== Rowing palmares ==
=== Olympic Games ===
- 1996 Atlanta Olympics W4x two seat – ninth
- 2000 Sydney Olympics W8+ stroke – fifth
- 2004 Athens Olympics W2X stroke - ninth

=== World Championships ===
- 1995 Tampere W4x reserve
- 1997 Aiguebelette W2X stroke – sixth
- 1998 Cologne W4x two seat - bronze
- 1999 St Catharine's W4x stroke - eleventh
- 2001 Lucerne W8+ four seat – gold
- 2001 Lucerne W4- bow - gold
- 2002 Seville W8+ four seat - silver
- 2003 Milan W4x bow – gold

=== National Interstate Regatta ===
- 1995 Interstate women's single scull (VIC) – fourth
- 1996 Interstate women's single scull (VIC) – third
- 1997 Interstate women's single scull (VIC) – third
- 2000 Interstate women's W8+ (VIC) five seat – first
- 2001 Interstate women's W8+ (ACT) six seat – third
- 2002 Interstate women's W8+ (ACT) six seat – fourth
- 2003 Interstate women's W8+ (ACT) six seat – fifth
- 2004 Interstate women's W8+ (ACT) stroke – fourth
