= Majbrit Nielsen =

Danish rower

Personal information
- Nationality: Danish
- Born: 17 June 1982 (age 42); Fredensborg, Denmark

Sport
- Sport: Rowing

Majbrit Nielsen (born 17 June 1982) is a Danish rower. She competed in the women's quadruple sculls event at the 2004 Summer Olympics.
