= Olena Olefirenko =

Ukrainian rower (born 1978)

Medal record

Women's rowing

Representing Ukraine

Olympic Games
| Disqualified | 2004 Athens | Quadruple sculls |

European Rowing Championships
| Gold medal – first place | 2007 Poznań | W4x |
| Gold medal – first place | 2008 Marathon | W4x |

Olena Ivanivna Olefirenko (Ukrainian: Олена Іванівна Олефіренко; born 11 April 1978 in Novoyavorivsk, Lviv Oblast) is a Ukrainian rower. At the 2004 Olympics she was disqualified with her team when she was tested positive for ethamivan.
