= Kim Brennan =

Australian rower (born 1985)

Kim Brennan AM
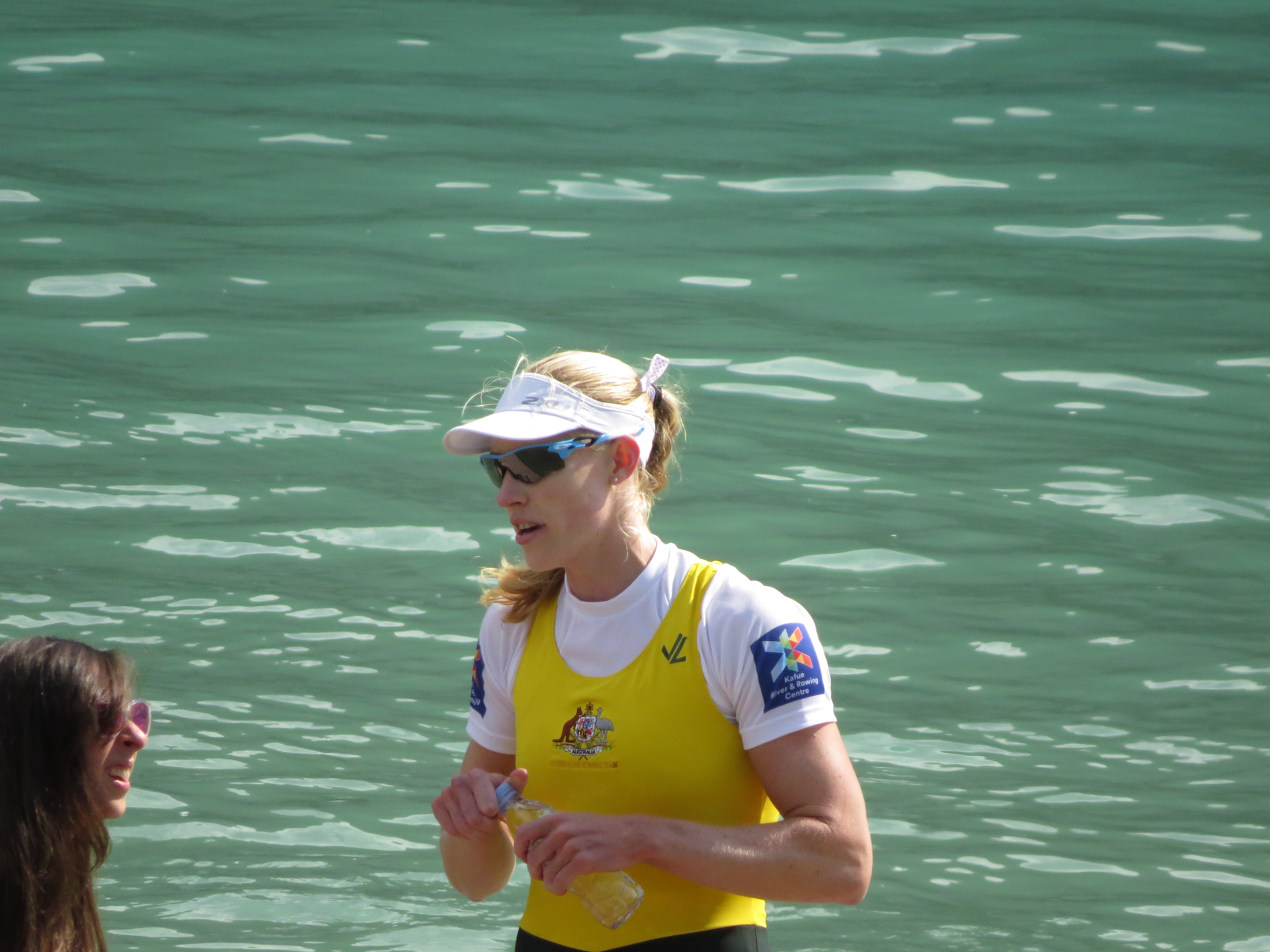
- Brennan in 2015

Personal information
- Full name: Kimberley Jean Brennan
- Born: Kimberley Jean Crow; 9 August 1985 (age 41) Melbourne, Australia
- Height: 188 cm (6 ft 2 in)
- Weight: 75 kg (165 lb)

Sport
- Club: Melbourne University Boat Club
- Coached by: Lyall McCarthy
Medal record
Representing Australia
Women's rowing
Olympic Games
Gold medal – first place	2016 Rio de Janeiro	Single sculls
Silver medal – second place	2012 London	Double sculls
Bronze medal – third place	2012 London	Single sculls
World Championships
Gold medal – first place	2013 Chungju	Single sculls
Gold medal – first place	2015 Aiguebelette	Single sculls
Silver medal – second place	2010 Karapiro	Double sculls
Silver medal – second place	2011 Bled	Double sculls
Silver medal – second place	2014 Amsterdam	Single sculls
Bronze medal – third place	2006 Eton	Eights
Women's athletics
World Youth Championships
Silver medal – second place	2001 Debrecen	400 m hurdles

Kimberley Jean "Kim" Brennan AM (née Crow; born 9 August 1985) is an Australian retired rower. She is a sixteen-time national champion, two-time World Champion, three-time Olympian and Olympic gold medallist.

== Personal life ==
Crow was born in Melbourne and went to school at Templestowe Heights Primary School from prep to year 4 then Ruyton Girls' School from year 5. Her father Max Crow was a Victorian Football League footballer between 1974 and 1986. She is a qualified lawyer and has been a regular columnist for The Age. She married Beijing Olympic double sculls gold medallist Scott Brennan in Hobart, Tasmania on 30 December 2015 and became known as Kim Brennan. The couple has a son, Jude, born in 2018.

== Athletics career ==
Crow was a 400 m hurdler and she won the silver medal at the 2001 World Youth Championships in Athletics. She won the Australian junior title at the Australian Athletics Championships for the seasons 2001–2002 and 2003–2004. At the 2003–2004 Australian Athletics Championships, she finished fourth in the senior final behind Jana Pittman and was the ranked the second Australian.

== Rowing career ==
In 2005, Crow took up rowing after a leg injury ended her hurdling career. Crow rows from the Melbourne University Boat Club in Melbourne and represents Victoria at the national level.

At the Australian Rowing Championships in 2012, 2015 and 2016 she won the Nell Slater Trophy in the Interstate Women's Single Scull representing Victoria. During the Victorian women's eights' twelve year consecutive victory run from 2005 to 2016, Crow was seated in the boat on nine occasions for nine Queen's Cup victories up until 2016. On five occasions at the Interstate Regatta she has raced in both the eight and the single scull on the same day, winning both titles on three occasions. She was coached by Lyall McCarthy at Rowing Australia's Centre of Excellence in Canberra.

In Melbourne University Boat Club colours, she contested the Australian national single sculls title at the Australian Rowing Championships five times from 2010 to 2014. She won that championship from 2011 to 2014.

=== Olympic Games ===
Crow with her partner Sarah Cook finished fourth in the women's coxless pair B-Final at the 2008 Beijing Olympics. At the 2012 London Olympic Games, Crow won a silver medal in the women's double sculls (with Brooke Pratley) and a bronze medal in the women's single sculls. At the 2015 world rowing championships, Crow qualified the single scull for Australia to race at Rio 2016. At those 2016 Summer Olympics, Brennan won the women's single scull and took the gold medal, leading the race from start to finish.

In May 2019, Brennan was announced as Australia's joint Deputy Chef de Mission, alongside fellow Olympians, Susie O'Neill and Evelyn Halls for the Tokyo 2020 Olympic Games.

=== World Championships ===
Crow was in the seven seat of Australian women's eight that won the bronze medal at the 2006 World Rowing Championships. She teamed with Kerry Hore to win silver medals in the Women's double scull at the 2010 and 2011 World Rowing Championships. At the 2013 World Rowing Championships in Chungju, Crow won gold in the single scull taking a lead from the 300 m mark and holding it to the line. In the same event at the 2014 World Rowing Championships in Amsterdam, Crow took silver behind New Zealand's Emma Twigg. Crow became a dual world champion when she won gold in the single scull at the 2015 World Rowing Championships in Aiguebelette, defeating 2012 Summer Olympics champion Miroslava Knapková.

On 3 November 2018, Brennan officially announced her retirement from rowing at the Rowing Australia annual awards. She stated “While I’ve known within myself for some time that I am happy to leave my competitive rowing career behind me, the arrival of Jude has put the decision beyond any doubt. I’m loving every minute with him, and, on a personal level, I can’t imagine now being able to give the time and energy necessary to be successful in rowing at the top level". Rowing Australia President Rowing Australia President, Rob Scott said, “Kim has been an integral member of Australia's rowing team for over 10 years while also being a fantastic role model within the Australian Rowing Team and the broader Australian sporting community. Her performances on the world stage speak for themselves, but I am sure that one her proudest moments in the green and gold are when she won her Olympic gold medal at the Rio 2016 Olympic Games.

=== Retirement ===
Brennan announced her retirement from rowing in November 2018, after the birth of her son. She stated she still wants to be involved in rowing and the Olympic movement long into the future.

== Other appointments ==
She is Chair of the Australian Olympic Committee's (AOC) Athletes Commission and a full voting member on the AOC Board.

== Accolades ==
- 2010 and 2011 – Rowing Australia Awards – Female Athlete of the Year with Kerry Hore
- 2012 and 2013 – Rowing Australia Awards – Female Athlete of the Year
- 2012, 2013 and 2016 – Victorian Female Athlete of the Year
- 2013 and 2016 – AIS Sport Performance Awards – Female Athlete of the Year
- 2013 – International Rowing Federation – Female Athlete of the Year
- 2013 – Australian Women's Health Prime Minister's Women in Sport Award
- 2016 – ACT Sports Awards – Female Athlete of the Year
- 2016 – Women's Health I Support Women in Sport (ISWIS) Awards – Sportswoman Of The Year
- 2017 – Member of the Order of Australia – for significant service to rowing, to the welfare of elite athletes, to sport as a gold medallist at the Rio 2016 Olympic Games, and to the community.
- 2018 — named as one of The Australian Financial Review 100 Women of Influence in the Arts, Culture and Sport category
- 2019 — Thomas Keller Medal — For her "exceptional rowing career and exemplary sportsmanship"
- 2023 — Sport Australia Hall of Fame inductee

Awards and achievements
Preceded by Alicia Coutts and Tom Slingsby	Australian Institute of Sport Athlete of the Year; 2013 (with Caroline Buchanan)	Succeeded by Jessica Fox
