= Meike Evers =

German rower (born 1977)

Medal record

Women's rowing

Representing Germany

Olympic Games
Gold medal – first place	2000 Sydney	Quad sculls
Gold medal – first place	2004 Athens	Quad sculls

World Championships
Gold medal – first place	1997 Aiguebelette	Double sculls
Gold medal – first place	1999 St. Catharines	Quad sculls

Meike Evers (born 6 June 1977 in Berlin) is a German rower who was co-winner of two Olympic gold medals. She is currently a police detective and member of the "Athlete Committee" of the World Anti-Doping Agency.
