= Debbie Flood =

British rower

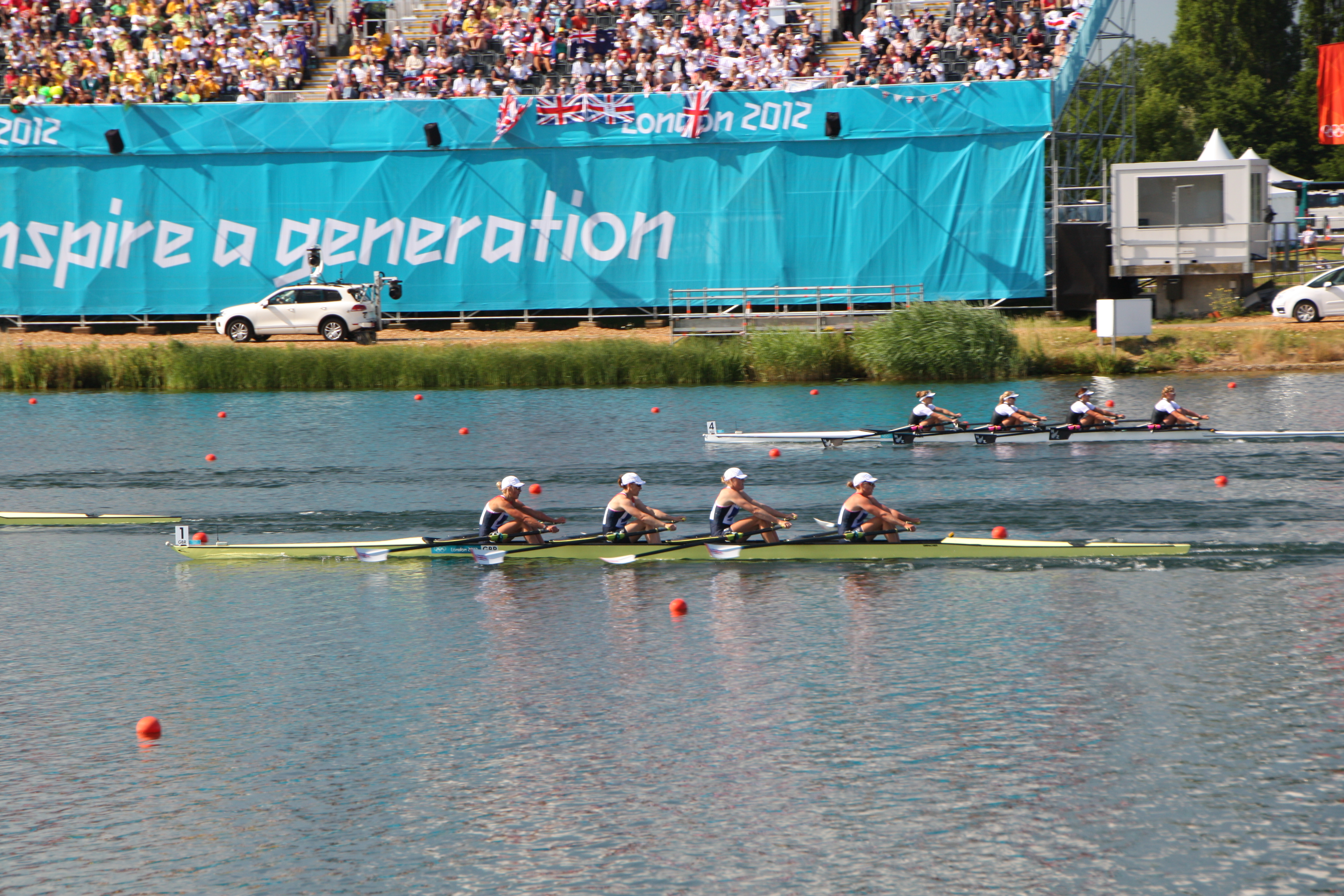
- Quadruple scull of Great Britain (including Debbie Flood) at the 2012 Summer Olympics

Personal information
- Full name: Deborah Kirsty Flood
- Nationality: British
- Born: 27 February 1980 (age 46) Harrogate, Yorkshire

Sport
- Club: Tideway Scullers School
Medal record
Women's rowing
Representing Great Britain
Olympic Games
Silver medal – second place	2004 Athens	Quadruple sculls
Silver medal – second place	2008 Beijing	Quadruple sculls
World Rowing Championships
Gold medal – first place	2006 Eton	Women's quad
Gold medal – first place	2007 Munich	Women's quad
Gold medal – first place	2010 Karapiro	Women's quad

Deborah Kirsty Bruwer (née Flood; born 27 February 1980) is an English rower, noteworthy for winning silver medals in the quadruple sculls at both the 2004 and 2008 Olympic Games.

== Biography ==
Flood was born in Harrogate, Yorkshire, and was a Great Britain junior judo international and a county level 1500m and cross–country runner and shot–putter before she took up rowing.

She won a bronze medal at the 1998 World Junior championships in the double sculls along with partner Frances Houghton. The following year they both won gold in the double sculls at the World Under 23 Championships.

In 2000 Flood won gold in the single sculls at the World Under 23 Championships and the single sculls national title rowing for the Tideway Scullers School at the 2000 National Championships. Also in 2000, Flood won the Princess Royal Challenge Cup (the premier women's singles sculls event) at the Henley Royal Regatta.

At the 2006 World Championships, Flood originally finished in the silver medal position in the quadruple sculls, but was elevated to gold after one of the Russian crew failed a drugs test.

Having taken a year off in 2009, Flood returned to take World Championships gold again in 2010, in the quad sculls with Beth Rodford, Frances Houghton, and Annabel Vernon.

At the 2012 Summer Olympics Flood competed in the GB quad scull with Beth Rodford, Frances Houghton, and Melanie Wilson and finished in fifth place.

In December 2012 Flood was elected captain of Leander Club, the first time a woman had been appointed to this role in almost 200 years.

Debbie is a Christian and works for Christians in Sport.
