= Christina Rindom =

Danish rower

Personal information
- Nationality: Danish
- Born: 10 April 1973 (age 51); Glostrup, Denmark

Sport
- Sport: Rowing

Christina Rindom (born 10 April 1973) is a Danish rower. She competed in the women's quadruple sculls event at the 2004 Summer Olympics.
