= Beth Rodford =

British rower

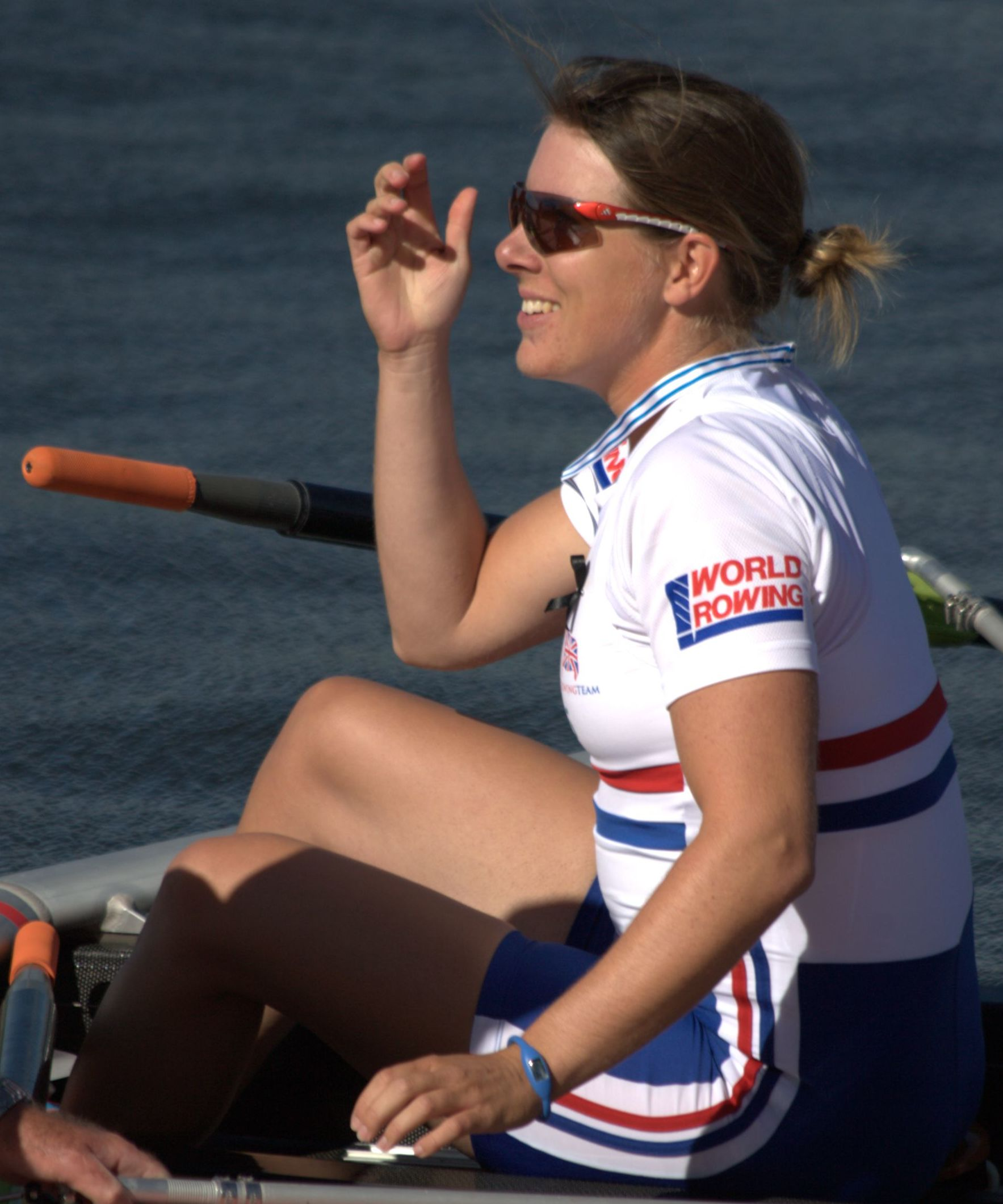

Personal information
- Born: 28 December 1982 (age 43) Burton-upon-Trent, England

Achievements and titles
- Olympic finals: 2008 Summer Olympics; 2012 Summer Olympics
Medal record
Representing Great Britain
World Rowing Championships
Gold medal – first place	2010 Karapiro	Women's quad

Beth Rodford (born 28 December 1982) is a British rower. Rodford participated in two Olympic games, 2008 Summer in Beijing and 2012 Summer in London. At Beijing, she finished in fifth place in the Women's Eight. In 2012 at London, she finished in sixth position in the quadruple sculls. She announced her retirement from international rowing on 16 December 2015.

== Biography ==
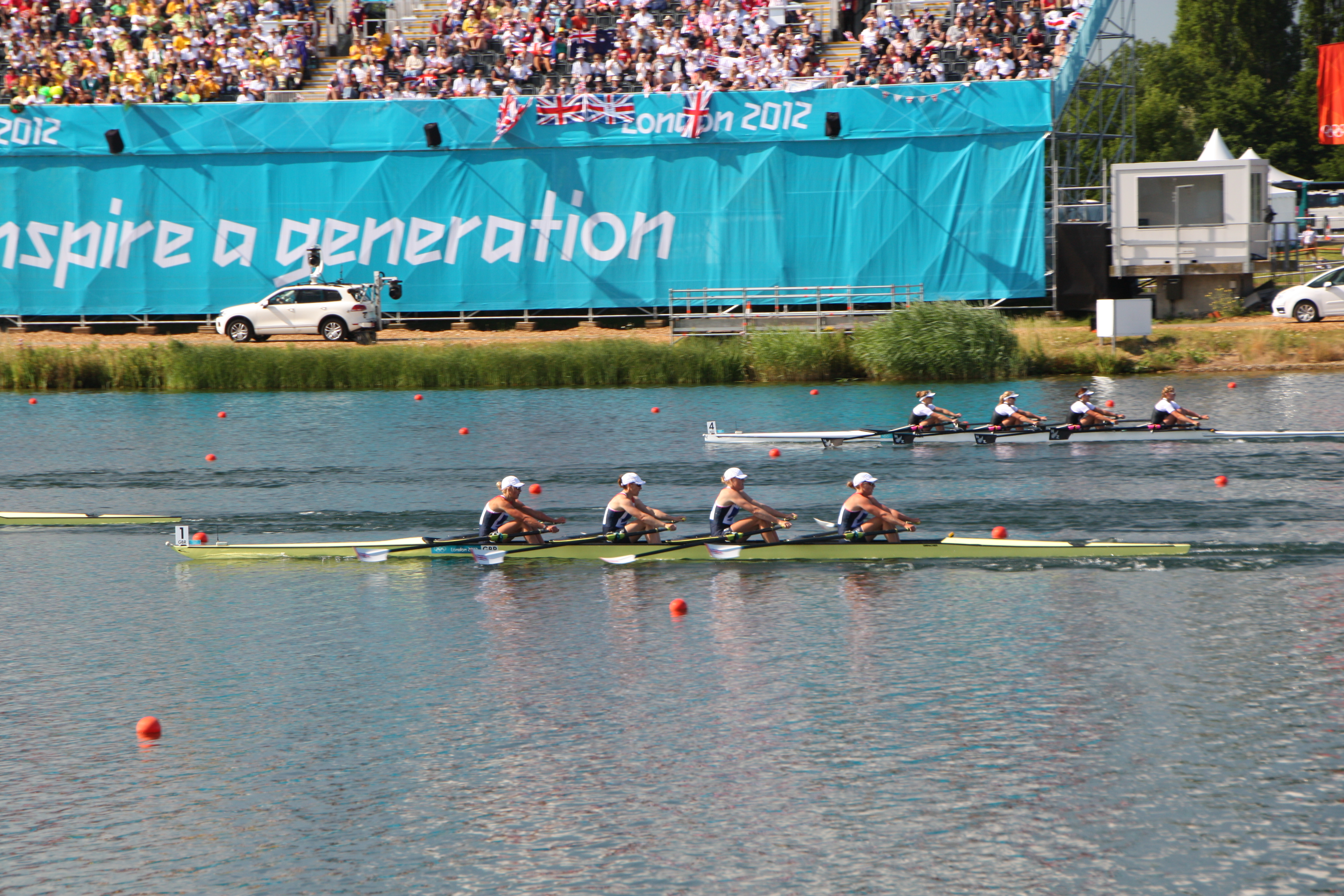
Quadruple scull of Great Britain (including Beth Rodford) at the 2012 Summer Olympics

Rodford was born in Burton-upon-Trent. Rodford currently lives in Gloucestershire. She is a student, and is studying Sports Science at Brunel University in London, UK. Rodford is 77 kilograms (170 pounds) in weight, and is 178 centimetres (70 inches) tall.

== Rowing ==
Rodford started rowing in 1995. She began rowing when in secondary school, and despite initial difficulties kept going and was first selected to represent Britain in 1999, winning a bronze medal in the coxless four at the World Rowing Junior Championships. She currently trains with the Gloucester Rowing Club (Gloucester RC). She is classed as an official coach and rower. Rodford is trained by six people; Adrian Roberts (Ade Roberts), Cath Pollard, Gary Stubbs, John Keogh, Mark Pollard and Ron Needs. She holds the British indoor record over 2000 metres at J13, J14, J15, and J16. For much of her career Rodford rowed in a Quadruple scull (quad scull; W4x) rowing boat, and participated in the Women's Quadruple Sculls event, and the Women's Eight. Rodford received Lottery Funding from UK Sport.

Rodford participated in the 2008 Summer Olympics and finished in fifth place in the Women's Eight. She won the gold medal in women's quadruple sculls at the 2010 World Rowing Championships. In the 2011 World Cup series she won silver and gold medals. At the 2012 Summer Olympics held in London, she finished in sixth position with Team GB in the W4x class, with a final time of 06:51.54. She was "off colour" throughout the 2012 season. In the 2012 World cup competitions she raced in the women's quadruple scull. In Belgrade and Munich the team won bronze medals. In Lucerne they finished in fifth place.

=== 2014 ===
On 17 March 2014 Rodford was part of the composite crew that won the Women's Eights Head of the River Race on the River Thames in London, setting a record time of 17:42.2 for the 4 1/4-mile (6.8 km) Championship Course from Mortlake to Putney. The crew comprised Heather Stanning – Army RC; Beth Rodford – Gloucester RC; Zoe Lee – Imperial College BC; Jessica Eddie – London RC; Helen Glover – Minerva Bath Rowing Club; Olivia Carnegie-Brown – Oxford Brookes University BC; Tina Stiller – Tees RC; Caragh McMurtry – Reading University BC; cox Phelan Hill – Leander Club.
