= John Keogh (rower) =

Australian rower and coach

Personal information
- Nationality: Australian
- Born: 3 April 1969 (age 57)
- Years active: 1986–

Sport
- Country: Australia
- Sport: Rowing
- Club: North Esk Rowing Club; Torrens Rowing Club

Achievements and titles
- National finals: Penrith Cup 1990-91

John Keogh (born 3 April 1969) is an Australian elite performance rowing coach and a former national representative rower. As lightweight oarsman he was a dual national champion in 1991 and an Australian representative in the men's lightweight four at the 1991 and 1992 World Championships. He has been a high performance coach for British Rowing, then from 2010 to 2016 he led the women's programme at Rowing Canada. Since 2016 he has been the head women's coach at Rowing Australia.

== Club and state rowing ==
Keogh is a Tasmanian. His senior club rowing was initially from the North Esk Rowing Club in Launceston. When he relocated to South Australia to pursue national representative selection he rowed from the Torrens Rowing Club.

His state representative debut for came when he was selected to the 1986 Tasmanian youth eight, which contested the Noel F Wilkinson Trophy at the Interstate Regatta within the Australian Rowing Championships. He rowed again in the Tasmanian state youth eights at the 1987 and 1988 Interstate Regattas. In 1989 he was selected in the Tasmanian men's lightweight four which contested the President's Cup at the Interstate Regatta . In 1990 he relocated to South Australia to pursue his rowing goals and in 1990 and 1991 he raced in South Australian lightweight fours contesting the Penrith Cup. In 1991 he stroked the South Australian lightweight four to a Penrith Cup victory.

He won a national U23 title as stroke of a lightweight pair at the 1988 Australian Rowing Championships. In 1989 he was selected in a composite South Australian and Tasmanian club crew to race for the men's lightweight eight national title but the championship races were cancelled due to conditions. That year he did race for North Esk to 2nd place in the U23 title for the men's lightweight pair.

After relocation to South Australia he raced in Torrens Rowing Club colours in composite South Australian crews. In 1990 his crew placed second in the men's lightweight four in 1991 and third in the men's lightweight eight. The following year he won the national championship in the men's lightweight four in 1991 and placed fourth in the men's lightweight eight. In 1993 he was back in North Esk colours and racing in a heavyweight crew for the men's coxless four championship title.

== International representative rowing ==
Keogh made his Australian representative debut at stroke in the men's lightweight four who rowed to a fourth placing at the 1990 World Rowing Championships in Lake Barrington, Tasmania. The following year he stroked the all South Australian national champion lightweight four at the 1991 World Rowing Championships in Vienna to another fourth placing.

== Coaching career ==
Keogh began coaching in 1997 initially with school crews at Scotch Oakburn College in Launceston. In 1998 he took a Scotch Oakburn coxed four to national champion status at the Australian Rowing Championships. In 1998 he also coached the Tasmanian youth eight at the Interstate Regatta.

Keogh's coaching medal record at the Olympic Games and World Championships:

=== Olympic Games ===
- Beijing 2008 Fifth – Great Britain Women's 8+ and Sixth – Great Britain Women's 2-
- London 2012 Silver – Canada Women's 8+
- Rio 2016 Fifth – Canada Women's 8+
- Tokyo 2020 Gold – Australia Women's 4- and Seventh - Australia Women's 2-

=== World Championships ===
- 2005 World Rowing Championships Bronze - Great Britain Women's Lwt 4X
- 2006 World Rowing Championships Bronze - Great Britain Women's Lwt 4X
- 2007 World Rowing Championships Bronze - Great Britain Women's 8+
- 2010 World Rowing Championships Silver - Canadian Women's 8+
- 2011 World Rowing Championships Silver - Canadian Women's 8+
- 2013 World Rowing Championships Silver - Canadian Women's 4x and Silver - Canadian Women's 4- and Bronze - Canadian Women's 8+
- 2014 World Rowing Championships Silver - Canadian Women's Lwt 2x and Silver - Canadian Women's 8+
- 2015 World Rowing Championships Bronze - Canadian Women's 8+
- 2017 World Rowing Championships Silver - Australian Women's Lwt 4x
- 2018 World Rowing Championships Bronze - Australian Women's 8+
- 2019 World Rowing Championships Silver - Australian Women's 8+ and Silver - Australian Women's 2-
- 2022 World Rowing Championships Bronze - Australian Women's 4-
