= Mariya Vorona =

Belarusian rower

Personal information
- Born: 15 November 1983 (age 42) Minsk, Belarus
- Height: 1.84 m (6 ft 0 in)
- Weight: 77 kg (170 lb)

Sport
- Country: Belarus
- Sport: Rowing
- Event: quadruple sculls
Medal record
World Championships
Bronze medal – third place	2002 Seville	W4x
Silver medal – second place	2003 Milan	W4x

Mariya Vorona (born 15 November 1983 in Minsk, Belarus) is a Belarusian rower. She competed in the women's quadruple sculls at the 2004 Summer Olympics.
