= Volha Berazniova =

Belarusian rower (born 1980)

Personal information
- Native name: Вольга Беразнёва
- Born: 10 May 1980 (age 46) Minsk, Belarus
- Height: 1.86 m (6 ft 1 in)
- Weight: 75 kg (165 lb)

Sport
- Country: Belarus
- Sport: Rowing
Medal record
European Rowing Championships
Bronze medal – third place	2007 Poznan	W2x
Silver medal – second place	2011 Plovdiv	W8+

Volha Berazniova (born 10 May 1980 in Minsk, Belarus) is a Belarusian rower. She competed in the women's eight at the 2000 Summer Olympics and the women's quadruple sculls at the 2004 Summer Olympics.
