= Jo Lutz =

Australian rower

Personal information
- Born: 3 August 1980 (age 45)
- Years active: 2000–2006

Sport
- Sport: Rowing
- Club: Swan River Rowing Club
Medal record
Women's rowing
Representing Australia
World Rowing Championships
Gold medal – first place	2001 Lucerne	W4-
Gold medal – first place	2001 Lucerne	W8+
Gold medal – first place	2006 Eton	W4-
Silver medal – second place	2002 Seville	W8+
Bronze medal – third place	2006 Eton	W8+

Jo Lutz (born 3 August 1980 in Perth, Western Australia) is an Australian former rower, a three-time world champion.

== Club and state rowing ==
Lutz's senior club rowing was done from the Swan River Rowing Club in Perth. She was awarded a scholarship to the AIS prior to her 2001 World Championship success.

She raced in composite crews in Swan River Rowing Club colours contesting national titles at the Australian Rowing Championships – in 2006 and 2007 in the coxless pair, coxless four and the women's eight and in 2008 in the coxless four.

Lutz was first selected to represent Western Australia in the state youth eight contesting the Interstate Regatta within the Australian Rowing Championships in 1998 and again in 2000. She rowed in Western Australian senior women's eights contesting the Queen's Cup at Australian Championships on eight occasions between 2001 and 2008.

== International representative rowing ==
Lutz first represented for Australia in a coxless four at the World Rowing Cup II in Lucerne in 2000. That same year she was selected for the World Rowing U23 Championships in Copenhagen in a coxless four. They placed sixth.

Lutz was called up to Australian senior crews in 2001. In their first competitive outing of the 2001 season, racing as an Australian Institute of Sport selection eight at Henley Royal Regatta, Lutz won the 2001 Henley Prize for women's eights (from 2002 this event was renamed the Remenham Challenge Cup). She rowed in two Australian boats at the World Rowing Cup IV regatta in Munich Germany. The coxless four won that regatta and the Australian eight placed second but were on track for possible World Championship success. A month later at the 2001 World Rowing Championships in Lucerne, Lutz rowed at two in the Australian women's heavyweight crew stroked by Kristina Larsen to win Australia's first ever women's eight World Championship title. With their excellent pre-Championship form Lutz doubled-up with Jane Robinson, Julia Wilson and Victoria Roberts in the coxless four and also won gold. Lutz came home in 2001 as a dual World Champion and a member of the first Australian crew to win the women's eight event at Henley.

With just one seat change the Australian women's eight stayed together into 2002. Their European campaign ahead of the World Championships saw them take a bronze medal at the Rowing World Cup II in Lucerne and silver at the Rowing World Cup III in Munich. At the 2002 World Championships in Seville Spain, the Australian eight won their heat but were beaten out by the USA by 0.45 seconds in the final. The Australian's with Lutz again in the two seat just held out the Germans and Lutz won her third World Championship placing – a silver.

Leading into the 2004 Athens Olympics Lutz was in contention for the Australian women's eight and she raced in the crew at the World Rowing Cup III in Lucerne. From that boat Lutz and Danielle Jolly were ultimately changed out for Catriona Oliver and Julia Wilson before Athens and Lutz missed Olympic selection.

Lutz was back in elite Australian crew contention in 2006. She raced in a coxless pair and the eight at both World Rowing Cups I and II in Munich and Poznan and secured her place in the eight and in the coxless four for the 2006 World Rowing Championships at Eton, Dorney. The eight took the bronze and in the four with Robyn Selby Smith, Amber Bradley and Kate Hornsey, won the gold and her and final third World Championship title.
