= Mariya Brel =

Belarusian rower (born 1982)

Personal information
- Born: 16 October 1982 (age 42); Mazyr, Belarus
- Height: 1.76 m (5 ft 9 in)
- Weight: 72 kg (159 lb)

Sport
- Country: Belarus
- Sport: Rowing
- Event: quadruple sculls

Mariya Brel (born 16 October 1982 in Mazyr, Belarus) is a Belarusian rower. She competed in the women's quadruple sculls at the 2004 Summer Olympics.
