= Anna Sergeyeva =

Russian rower

Personal information
- Nationality: Russian
- Born: 7 May 1975 (age 49); Saint Petersburg, Russia

Sport
- Sport: Rowing

Anna Sergeyeva (born 7 May 1975) is a Russian rower. She competed in the women's quadruple sculls event at the 2004 Summer Olympics.
