= Tatsyana Narelik =

Belarusian rower

Tatyana Narelik
Personal information
- Native name: Татьяна Николаевна Нарелик
- Full name: Tatyana Nikolayevna Narelik
- Born: 10 January 1983 (age 42); Gomel, Belarus
- Height: 1.79 m (5 ft 10 in)
- Weight: 72 kg (159 lb)

Sport
- Country: Belarus
- Sport: Rowing

Tatyana Narelik (born 10 January 1983 in Gomel, Belarus) is a Belarusian rower. She competed in the women's quadruple sculls at the 2004 Summer Olympics.
