= Hanna Shcherba =

Belarusian-French swimmer

Personal information
- Born: 11 January 1982 (age 44) Baranovichi, Byelorussian SSR, Soviet Union
- Height: 1.72 m (5 ft 8 in)
- Weight: 62 kg (137 lb)
- Spouse: Arnaud Lorgeril

Sport
- Sport: Swimming
- Club: RTsFVS Baranovichi; CS Clichy 92
Medal record
Women's swimming
Representing Belarus
European Championships (LC)
| Silver medal – second place | 2002 Berlin | 200 m medley |
| Silver medal – second place | 2004 Madrid | 200 m medley |
European Championships (SC)
| Silver medal – second place | 2002 Riesa | 4×50 m freestyle |
| Bronze medal – third place | 2002 Riesa | 200 m medley |
| Silver medal – second place | 2003 Dublin | 200 m medley |
| Bronze medal – third place | 2003 Dublin | 100 m medley |

Hanna (Anna) Vyachaslavauna Shcherba (Belarusian: Ганна Вячаславаўна Шчэрба; born 11 January 1982) is a Belarusian-French swimmer who won six medals, mostly in medley events, at the European Championships of 2002–2004. She competed in four events at the 2004 and 2008 Summer Olympics with the best achievement of sixth place in the 4 × 100 m freestyle relay in 2008.

== Biography ==
Shcherba was born in Baranovichi, Belarus. She has a younger sister Mariya Shcherba who is also an Olympic swimmer. In October 2001 Hanna moved to France where she first competed for the club Melun, but then changed to CS Clichy. In 2005, she married Arnaud Lorgeril, a French competitive swimmer whom she knew from 2002, and changed her name and nationality; thus at the 2008 Olympics she competed for France as Shcherba-Lorgeril. She speaks Russian and French and works as a swimming coach at CS Clichy.
