= Mariya Shcherba =

Belarusian swimmer

Personal information
- Born: 14 April 1985 (age 40) Baranovichi, Soviet Union
- Height: 1.73 m (5 ft 8 in)
- Weight: 61 kg (134 lb)

Sport
- Sport: Swimming

Mariya Vyachaslavauna Shcherba (Belarusian: Марыя Вячаславаўна Шчэрба; born 14 April 1985) is a Belarusian swimmer. She competed in the 4×100 m freestyle relay at the 2004 Summer Olympics, but her team did not reach the finals.

Her elder sister is the Olympic swimmer Hanna Shcherba. Soon after Hanna moved to France in 2001, Mariya followed her there and competed for the club CS Clichy 92.
