= Etamivan =

Chemical compound

Clinical data
- Trade names: Analepticon
- ATC code: R07AB04 (WHO)

Identifiers
- IUPAC name: N,N-Diethyl-4-hydroxy-3-methoxybenzamide
- CAS Number: 304-84-7
- PubChem CID: 9363
- DrugBank: DB08989
- ChemSpider: 8996
- UNII: M44O63YPV9
- KEGG: D04080
- CompTox Dashboard (EPA): DTXSID3023007
- ECHA InfoCard: 100.005.599

Chemical and physical data
- Formula: C_{12}H_{17}NO_{3}
- Molar mass: 223.272 g·mol^{−1}
- 3D model (JSmol): Interactive image
- SMILES: CCN(CC)C(=O)c1ccc(O)c(OC)c1
- InChI: InChI=1S/C12H17NO3/c1-4-13(5-2)12(15)9-6-7-10(14)11(8-9)16-3/h6-8,14H,4-5H2,1-3H3; Key:BQJODPIMMWWMFC-UHFFFAOYSA-N

Etamivan (INN, or ethamivan (USAN); trade names Analepticon, Emivan, and Vandid) is a respiratory stimulant drug related to nikethamide. It was mainly used in the treatment of barbiturate overdose and chronic obstructive pulmonary disease, but has now largely fallen into disuse.

Adverse effects which are common to the respiratory stimulant class include sneezing, coughing, and laryngospasm when infused too rapidly. More serious adverse events include muscle twitching, tremors, and convulsions. The dose to treat barbiturate intoxication or carbon dioxide narcosis in adults ranges from 0.5 mg/kg to 5.0 mg/kg, infused intravenously over several minutes. Epilepsy and the use of monoamine oxidase inhibitors or other adrenergic drugs are contraindications.
