= Sally Robbins =

Australian sportswoman (born 1981)

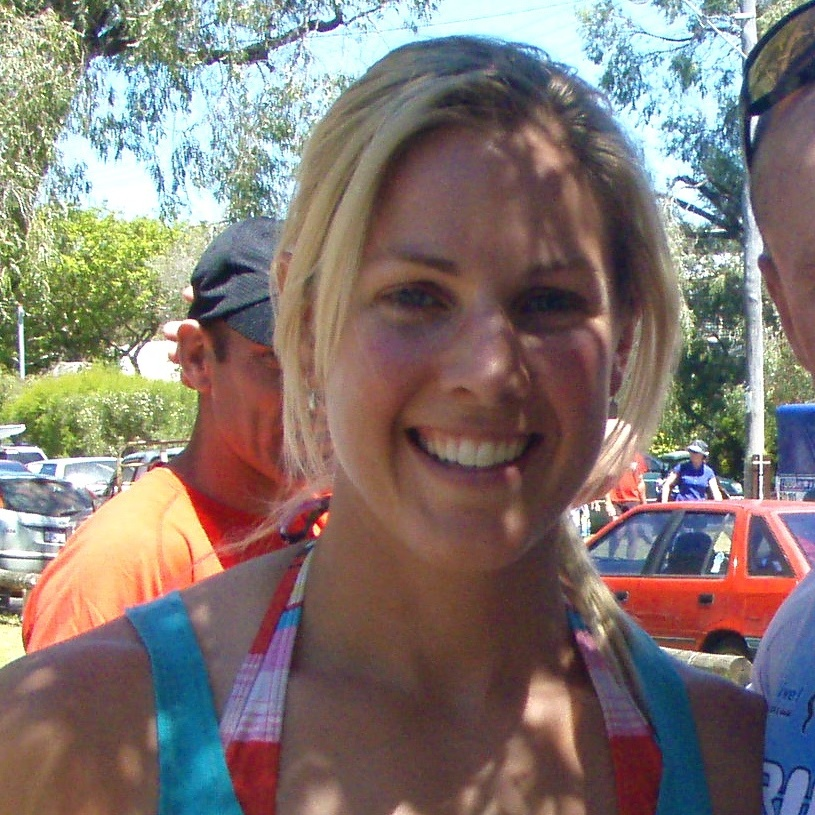
- Robbins in 2007

Personal information
- Full name: Sally Robbins
- Nationality: Australian
- Born: 15 July 1981 (age 45) Perth, Western Australia
- Height: 1.83 m (6 ft 0 in)
- Weight: 78 kg (172 lb)

Sport
- Sport: Rowing, cycling
- Events: Women's four, women's eight
- Club: Swan River Rowing Club

Achievements and titles
- Olympic finals: 2000, 2004
- World finals: 2000, 2001, 2002, 2003, 2004

Sally Robbins (born 15 July 1981) is an Australian sportswoman. Originally from Perth, Western Australia, she attended the rowing program at the Western Australian Institute of Sport, and later represented Australia at the women's four at the 2000 Olympics and the women's eight at the 2004 Olympics. At the 2004 Olympics she stopped rowing due to exhaustion during the final part of the race, for which she was heavily criticised. After the conclusion of her rowing career, Robbins attempted to become a professional cyclist.

== Biography ==
Robbins was born in Perth, Western Australia, and attended Melville Senior High School. She began rowing at the age of 13, and attended the Western Australian Institute of Sport.

Robbins was involved in an infamous incident in the 2004 Olympics final held on 22 August. The team was third through the first 1000 metres but had dropped to fifth position with 500 metres remaining, three seconds behind the Romanian crew in first position. During the final 400 metres Robbins, who was physically exhausted, dropped her oar, allowing it to drag in the water, gave up and lay back on teammate Julia Wilson's lap. Australia, consequently, finished last, ten seconds behind the fifth-place crew.

Robbins was accused of mental weakness and publicly ridiculed in the Australian media as "Lay-down Sally", a play on the Eric Clapton song of the same name. The Daily Telegraph reported:

"In a team sport such as rowing what she did was unforgivable. It appears Robbins committed the greatest crime there is in honest sport: she quit."

Even then Australian Prime Minister John Howard became involved in the row, saying:

"I'm not taking sides but it's always regrettable, it's tough and there's a lot of pressure. It's always a good idea to bind together but look, I wasn't there and I can understand the passion the emotion and the effort that goes into these things and the sense of disappointment people feel."

This was not the first time Robbins had been involved in such an incident. In the women's quad scull at the 2002 World Rowing Championships in Seville, Robbins had also dropped her oar, costing Australia certain victory. 2000 Summer Olympics silver medallist Rachael Taylor was quoted as saying:

"Australia was blitzing the race, leading the entire field all the way. It was as about as sure a thing as you could get to having the world title in the bag, when with approximately 400 metres to go Sally Robbins stopped rowing. The Australian crew dropped back and finished in fourth position. Sally's three teammates were understandably shocked, devastated and inconsolable: not at all dissimilar to the sickening re-enactment I witnessed on Sunday."

In March 2006, Robbins conducted televised media interviews and expressed her goal to row for Australia at the 2008 Summer Olympics. However, ultimately, Robbins did not achieve the qualification times and was omitted from the squad.

In April and May 2007, Robbins' motivational problems were discussed in court by former team members Katie Foulkes (coxswain) and Kyeema Doyle when they were called upon by Sydney broadcaster Alan Jones to give evidence on his behalf in response to a defamation suit brought by Australian Olympic Committee President John Coates.

On Rowing Australia athletes profile page, Robbins personal motto is recorded as "Never surrender the dream".
