= Lyall McCarthy =

Australian rower and rowing coach

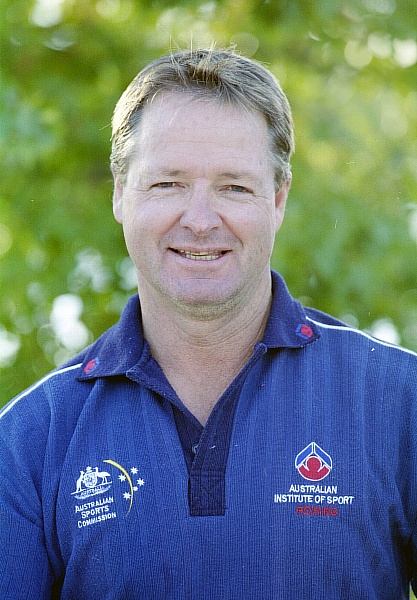
- Australian Institute of Sport women's rowing coach Lyall McCarthy

Personal information
- Born: 19 May 1956 (age 70)

Sport
- Sport: Rowing
Medal record
Men's rowing
Representing Australia
World Rowing Championships
Bronze medal – third place	1978 Copenhagen	Lwt men's eight

Lyall McCarthy OAM (born 19 May 1956) is a former Australian national champion lightweight rower and national rowing coach. He has coached Australian crews to gold medals at the World Rowing Championships and the Olympic Games.

== Club and state rowing ==
McCarthy competed as a lightweight oarsman and rowed for a number of clubs in Sydney and in Melbourne over a fifteen year first class rowing career from 1977 to 1992.

He contested national championships titles at the Australian Rowing Championships in Drummoyne Rowing Club lightweight crews in 1977 and 1978. In 1980 he competed for the national lightweight pair title racing for the Mercantile Rowing Club. In 1981 he moved to the Melbourne University Boat Club, the home of the world champions Simon Gillett and Charles Bartlett. He won his first Australian national title in MUBC colours in a lightweight eight with Gillett, Bartlett and Peter Antonie and also contested the national lightweight coxless four title that year. In 1982 he was back in Sydney and raced for the Balmain Rowing Club at the Australian Championships that year contesting the national men's lightweight eight title. In 1985 he contested the national lightweight eight championship in a composite Sydney crew.

In 1981 McCarthy was first selected as a Victorian state representative to contest the Penrith Cup for lightweight fours in the Interstate regatta within the Australian Rowing Championships. In 1985 he raced for New South Wales in that same event. In 1990 he was back in Victorian dark blue for that event and that year they won the interstate championship title. His final state appearance in the Penrith Cup was in 1992 competing for Victoria.

== International representative rowing ==
His first major international event was the 1978 FISA Lightweight Championships where he won a bronze medal in the Australian men’s lightweight eight. It was twelve years before he again held a seat in the Australian lightweight eight in 1990 at the World Championships for a fifth placing. He represented again at the 1991 and 1992 World Championships and retired in 1992.

== Coaching career ==
McCarthy began coaching in 1994 with the Barwon Rowing Club at Geelong, Victoria and was appointed Australian Institute of Sport/Rowing Australia's Head Women's Coach located in Canberra in 1997. After the 2016 Rio Olympics, he was appointed Rowing Australia's Pathways Head Coach.

McCarthy's coaching medal record at the Olympic Games and World Championships.

=== Olympic Games ===
- 1996 Sixth – Men's Lightweight Coxless Four
- 2000 Fifth – Women's Eight
- 2004 Bronze medal – Women's Quad Scull
- 2008 Sixth – Women's Eight ; Tenth – Women's Pair
- 2012 Silver medal – Women's Double Scull; Bronze medal – Women's Single Scull (Kim Crow)
- 2016 Gold medal – Women's Single Scull (Kim Brennan nee Crow)

=== World Championships ===
McCarthy coached crews at the World Championships and was appointed Head Women's Coach for 2009, 2010 and 2011 World Championships.

- 1995 Ninth – Men's Lightweight Coxless Pair; Tenth – Men's Lightweight Coxless Four
- 1997 Gold medal – Men's Lightweight Eight
- 1998 Fifth – Men's Lightweight Coxless Pair
- 2001 Gold medal – Women's Four; Gold medal – Women's Eights
- 2002 Gold medal – Women's Four; Silver medal – Women's Eights; Sixth – Women's Pair
- 2003 Gold Medal – Women's Quadruple Scull; Sixth – Women's Double Scull; Eighteenth – Women's Single Scull
- 2005 Silver medal- Women's Pair; Bronze medal – Women's Double Scull; Seventh – Women's Single Scull
- 2006 Silver medal- Women's Quad Scull
- 2007 Fourth – Women's Eights
- 2010 Silver medal – Women's Double Scull; Fourth – Women's Quad Scull
- 2011 Silver medal – Women's Double Scull
- 2013 Gold medal – Women's Single Scull (Kim Crow)
- 2014 Silver medal – Women's Single Scull (Kim Crow)
- 2015 Gold medal – Women's Single Scull (Kim Crow)
- 2022 Bronze medal – Men's Double Scull

== Recognition ==
In 2003 and 2005, he was named Australian Institute of Sport Coach of the Year. In 2015 and 2016, he was Rowing Australia's Coach of the Year. In the 2018 Queen's Birthday Honours, he was awarded Medal (OAM) of the Order of Australia for service to rowing.
