= Quadruple scull =

Boat class in rowing

Quadruple scull typical icon

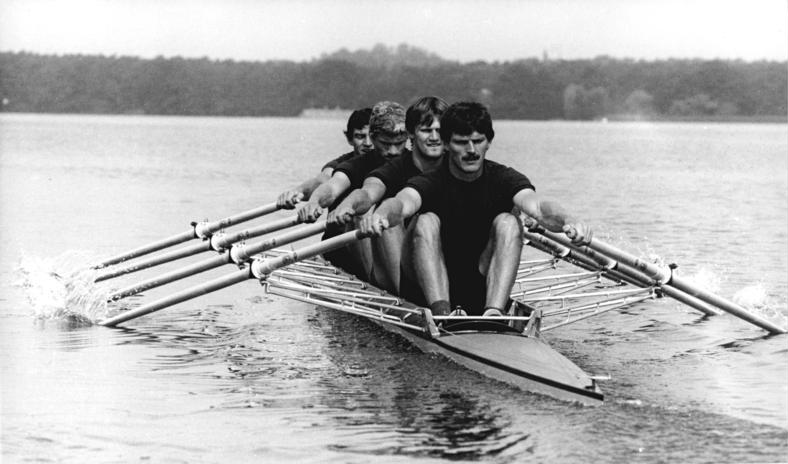
Quad scull Germany 1982: Martin Winter (front), Uwe Heppner (second), Uwe Mund (third), and Karl-Heinz Bußert (last)

A quadruple sculling boat, often simply called a quad and abbreviated as a 4x, is a racing shell used in the sport of competitive rowing. It is designed for four people who propel the boat by sculling with two oars, or "sculls", one in each hand.

Racing boats (often called "shells") are long, narrow, and broadly semi-circular in cross-section in order to reduce drag. They usually have a fin towards the rear, to help prevent roll and yaw. Originally made from wood, shells are now almost always made from a composite material (usually carbon-fiber reinforced plastic) for strength and weight advantages. The riggers in sculling apply the forces symmetrically to each side of the boat. Quad sculls is one of the classes recognized by the International Rowing Federation and the Olympics. FISA rules specify minimum weights for each class of boat so that no individual will gain a great advantage from the use of expensive materials or technology.

When there are four rowers in a boat, each with only one sweep oar and rowing on opposite sides, the combination is referred to as a "coxed four" or "coxless four" depending on whether the boat has a cox. In sweep oared racing the rigging means the forces are staggered alternately along the boat. The symmetrical forces in sculling make the boat more efficient and so the quadruple scull is faster than the coxless four.

A 'quad' is different from a 'four' in that a 'quad', or quadruple scull, is composed of four rowers each with two blades, sculling. A 'four' is made up of four rowers each with one oar in hand, sweeping.

== See also ==
- Rowing at the Summer Olympics
- World Rowing Championships
- Queen Mother Challenge Cup
- Double scull
