= Australia at the Commonwealth Games =

- CG code: AUS
- CGA: Commonwealth Games Australia
- Website: commonwealthgames.com.au
- Medals Ranked 1st: Gold 1,001 Silver 833 Bronze 766 Total 2,600

Commonwealth Games appearances (overview)
- 1930; 1934; 1938; 1950; 1954; 1958; 1962; 1966; 1970; 1974; 1978; 1982; 1986; 1990; 1994; 1998; 2002; 2006; 2010; 2014; 2018; 2022; 2026; 2030

Australia first competed at the Games, then titled the British Empire Games, in 1930; and is one of only six countries to have sent athletes to every Commonwealth Games. The others are Canada, England, New Zealand, Scotland, and Wales. Australian athletes competed for Australasia at the 1911 Festival of the Empire, the forerunner to the British Empire Games.

Five of the 23 games have been hosted by Australia, with the city of Gold Coast hosting the 2018 Commonwealth Games.

Australia has placed first at 15 out of the 23 games (compared with England 7 and Canada 1) and has been in the top three for all meets except the first games in 1930.

In all but one of the first 18 Commonwealth Games held (excluding the 1978 Games), the Australian flag bearer has gone on to win a gold medal.

== List of Games Host Nation Bids ==
=== Games Staged ===
Australia has hosted the Commonwealth Games on five occasions but have only won once via an international vote. That vote was for the host of the 2018 games, won by the Gold Coast.

Sydney 1938 was simply awarded.

Perth 1962 was a contest between Adelaide and Perth which Adelaide originally won at the 1956 Summer Olympics in Melbourne, Australia. Adelaide first won 13 votes to Perth's 3. Two years later that was overturned by the Australian Commonwealth Games Association prior to the 1958 British Empire Games in Cardiff, Wales. A New Vote awarded Perth with a 9 to 7 vote.

Brisbane 1982 was awarded after Lagos, Nigeria; Kuala Lumpur, Malaysia and Birmingham, England all withdrew prior to the Bid vote that took place in Montreal, Quebec, Canada during the 1976 Summer Olympics.

Melbourne 2006 was awarded to the city after Wellington, New Zealand, withdrew their bid prior to the Bid Lodgement Deadline.

Year	Host city, State	Years Between
2018 Commonwealth Games	Gold Coast, Queensland	12
2006 Commonwealth Games	Melbourne, Victoria	24
1982 Commonwealth Games	Brisbane, Queensland	20
1962 British Empire and Commonwealth Games	Perth, Western Australia	24
1938 British Empire Games	Sydney, New South Wales	-

=== Failed bid Results ===
Year	Australian Candidate City	Winning City	Vote Tally
1974 Commonwealth Games	Melbourne	Christchurch	2-36
1998 Commonwealth Games	Adelaide	Kuala Lumpur	25-40
2026 Commonwealth Games	Hobart	Regional Victoria	Unanimous
2030 Commonwealth Games	Perth	Ahmedabad	Withdrew

== Medals ==
=== Overall Medal Tally ===
Positions are calculated by the number of gold medals earned, then the number of silvers is taken into consideration and then the number of bronze.

Figures from Commonwealth Games Foundation website. Those represented in bold are the highest scoring medal tally for each individual medal.

The 2006 Games saw the highest overall medal tally, including the highest number of silver and bronze medals. The 1994 Games remains the Games with the highest number of gold medals won for Australia.

	(gold)	(silver)	(bronze)	Total
Australia	1001	832	763	2596

== Games Summary ==
=== 1911 Festival of the Empire ===
Australasian athletes representation

Games	Gold	Silver	Bronze	Total	Rank	Competitors	Officials	Flag Bearer Opening	Flag Bearer Closing	Che de Mission/General Manager
(England) 1911 London	2	2	4	8		7	1			Richard Coombes

=== Commonwealth Games ===
Games	Gold	Silver	Bronze	Total	Rank	Competitors	Officials	Flag Bearer Opening	Flag Bearer Closing	Che de Mission/General Manager
(Canada) 1930 Hamilton	3	4	1	8	5	9	2	Bobby Pearce		Hugh Weir
(England) 1934 London	8	4	2	14	3	17	2	Noel Ryan		Herbert Maxwell
(Australia) 1938 Sydney	25	19	22	66	1	154	11	Edgar 'Dunc Gray		Wilfred Kent Hughes
(New Zealand) 1950 Auckland	34	27	19	80	1	144	20	Mervyn Wood		Harold Wikes
(Canada) 1954 Vancouver	20	11	17	48	2	78	13	Dick Garrard		Jim Eve
(Wales) 1958 Cardiff	27	22	17	66	2	104	14	Ivan Lund		Jim Eve
(Australia) 1962 Perth	38	36	31	105	1	207	30	Tony Madigan		Edgar Tanner
(Jamaica) 1966 Kingston	23	28	22	73	2	101	23	David Dickson		Bill Young
(Scotland) 1970 Edinburgh	36	24	22	82	1	107	25	Pam Kilborn	Michael Wenden	Arthur Tunstall
(New Zealand) 1974 Christchurch	29	28	25	82	1	162	34	Michael Wenden		Bill Young
(Canada) 1978 Edmonton	24	33	27	84	3	148	42	Remo Sansonetti and Salvatore Sansonetti	Tracey Wickham	Les Martyn
(Australia) 1982 Brisbane	39	39	29	107	1	206	54	Rick Mitchell	Lisa Curry	Jim Barry
(Scotland) 1986 Edinburgh	40	46	35	121	3	227	69	Michael Turtur	Gael Martin	Arthur Tunstall
(New Zealand) 1990 Auckland	52	54	58	164	1	247	68	Lisa Curry-Kenny	Phillip Adams	Arthur Tunstall
(Canada) 1994 Victoria	**87**	52	43	182	1	245	92	Ian Hale	Gary Neiwand	Arthur Tunstall
(Malaysia) 1998 Kuala Lumpur	80	61	57	198	1	318	130	Kieren Perkins	Susan O'Neill	Don Stockins
(England) 2002 Manchester	82	62	63	207	1	352	131	Damian Brown	Ian Thorpe	Don Stockins
(Australia) 2006 Melbourne	84	**70**	**67**	**221**	1	417	168	Jane Saville	Leisel Jones	John Devitt
(India) 2010 Delhi	74	55	48	177	1	366	179	Sharelle McMahon	Alicia Coutts	Steve Mongehetti
(Scotland) 2014 Glasgow	49	42	46	137	2	414	184	Anna Meares	Mark Knowles	Steve Mongehetti
(Australia) 2018 Gold Coast	80	59	59	198	1	473		Mark Knowles	Kurt Fearnley	Steve Mongehetti
(England) 2022 Birmingham	67	57	56	180	1	429		Eddie Ockenden & Rachael Grinham	Melissa Wu	Petria Thomas
Total	1001	833	766	2600	1					

=== Overall Medal Tally by Sport ===
Overall total of medals achieved for each individual Commonwealth Games sporting area from 1911-2018. Includes 1911 Festival of the Empire.

Nation	Gold	Silver	Bronze	Total
Swimming	330	247	221	798
Athletics	206	171	141	518
Cycling	121	73	57	251
Shooting	70	59	42	171
Weightlifting (Note: Australia won 1 silver and 1 bronze medal in Powerlifting started from 2006 to 2014 when medals in Powerlifting were awarded under Weightlifting sport category. From 2018, Medals in Powerlifting were awarded separately under individual category name.)	59	53	48	160
Gymnastics	51	48	52	151
Diving	41	45	42	128
Lawn bowls	19	25	11	55
Boxing	18	19	38	75
Rowing	16	10	8	34
Wrestling	14	22	18	54
Squash	11	8	14	33
Hockey	11	2	1	14
Basketball	5	2	1	8
Judo	4	3	21	28
Netball	4	3	0	7
Fencing	3	15	10	28
Triathlon	3	4	8	15
Tennis	3	3	2	8
Ten-pin bowling	3	1	1	5
Beach volleyball	2	2	0	4
Badminton	2	1	9	12
Table tennis	1	6	5	12
Rugby sevens	1	2	2	5
Cricket	1	1	0	2
Archery	1	0	2	3
Water polo	1	0	0	1
Synchronised swimming	0	3	9	12
Powerlifting	0	0	1	1
Totals (29 entries)	**1,001**	**828**	**764**	**2,593**

=== Progressive Medal Tally ===
Commonwealth Games Progressive Medal Tally
**Year**	**Gold**	**Silver**	**Bronze**	**Total**
2018	936	777	714	2427
2014	856	718	654	2228
2010	807	676	608	2091
2006	733	621	560	1914
2002	649	552	492	1693
1998	567	490	429	1486
1994	487	429	372	1288
1990	400	377	329	1106
1986	348	323	273	944
1982	308	277	238	823
1978	269	238	209	716
1974	245	205	182	632
1970	216	177	157	550
1966	180	153	135	468
1962	157	125	113	395
1958	119	89	82	290
1954	92	67	65	224
1950	72	56	48	176
1938	38	29	29	96
1934	13	10	17	40
1930	5	6	4	15
1911	2	2	4	8

Note - 1911 Games includes medals won by all Australasia athletes

== Numbers of athletes and sports ==
This list shows the total number of athletes, male and female, and the total sports they were selected to compete in.

Year	Athletes	Male	Female	Sports
2026	255			10
2022	429			21
2018	473			18
2014	414			
2010	365			
2006	419	220	206	18
2002	352			
1998	318			15
1994	225			10
1990	247			11
1986	227	150	77	11
1982	206	141	65	11
1978	148	109	39	11
1974	162	115	47	10
1970	107	72	35	10
1966	101	71	30	10
1962	207	159	48	10
1958	104	82	22	10
1954	78	65	13	11
1950	144	121	23	12
1938	154	124	30	9
1934	17	15	2	6
1930	9	9	0	4

== Team & Individual Competitor Achievements ==
=== Notable Achievements ===
==== Represented at most Games ====
- Arthur Tunstall has represented Australia as an official at 8 Commonwealth Games (1962, 66, 70, 74, 78, 86, 90, 94).
- Runner Steve Moneghetti has represented Australia as an athlete in four Games (1986, 1990, 1994, 1998) and an official at four Games (2002, 2010, 2014, 2018)
- Donald Stockins has represented Australia as an official at 8 Commonwealth Games (1974, 78, 82, 86, 90, 94, 98, 2002).
- Badminton player Rhonda Cator has represented Australia as an athlete in five Games (1986, 1990, 1994, 1998, 2002) and an official at three Games (2004, 2010, 2014)
- Shooter Bruce Quick has represented in 7 Commonwealth Games (1990, 1998, 2002, 2006, 2010, 2014 and 2018)
- Shooter Phillip Adams has represented in 6 Commonwealth Games (1982, 86, 90, 94, 98, 2002).
- Shooter Russell Mark has represented in 6 Commonwealth Games (1990, 1994, 1998, 2002, 2006, 2010, 2014)
- Shooter James Corbett has represented in 6 Commonwealth Games (1986, 1990, 1998, 2006, 2010, 2014)
- Squash player David Palmer has represented in 6 Commonwealth Games (1998, 2002, 2006, 2010, 2014, 2018)

=== Best Individual Medal Achievements ===
==== Most gold medals won ====
- Swimmer Emma McKeon won 14 gold medals at three successive Games (2014, 18, 22).
- Swimmer Susie O'Neill won 10 gold medals at three successive Games (1990, 94, 98).
- Swimmer Ian Thorpe won 10 gold medals at two successive Games (1998, 2002).
- Swimmer Leisel Jones won 10 gold medals at three successive Games (2002, 06, 10).
- Swimmer Kyle Chalmers won 10 gold medals at three successive Games (2018, 22, 26).

==== Most gold medals won at a single Games ====
- Swimmer Susie O'Neill won 6 gold medals at the 1998 Games.
- Swimmer Ian Thorpe won 6 gold medals at the 2002 Games.
- Swimmer Emma McKeon won 6 gold medals at the 2022 Games.
- Swimmer Meg Harris won 6 gold medals at the 2026 Games.

==== Most medals won by a competitor ====
- Swimmer Emma McKeon won 20 medals (14 gold, 1 silver, 5 bronze) at three Games (2014, 18, 22).
- Shooter Phillip Adams has won 18 medals (7 gold, 9 silver, 2 bronze) at five Games (1982, 86, 90, 94, 2002).
- Swimmer Susie O'Neill has won 15 medals (10 gold, 5 silver) at three Games (1990, 94, 98).
- Swimmer Emily Seebohm has won 15 medals (7 gold, 4 silver, 4 bronze) at three Games (2010, 14, 18)
- Shooter Bruce Quick has won 14 medals (1 Gold, 9 Silver and 4 Bronze) at 6 games (1990, 1998, 2002, 2006, 2010 and 2014).

==== Oldest gold medal winner ====
- Dorothy Roche, was 61 years and 10 months old when she won a gold medal in the women's fours in Bowls at the 1990 Games.

==== Youngest gold medal winner ====
- Jenny Turrall, was 13 years, 8 months old when she won a gold medal in the 400m freestyle at Christchurch, New Zealand in 1974. Jenny Turrall also won Silver medals in the 200m Freestyle, 800m Freestyle and the women's 4×100 Freestyle Relay at the 1974 Christchurch Games.

=== Winning Streaks ===
Australia has won gold in the following events for each consecutive Games since the beginning of each individual streak.

- Swimming, Men's 4 × 200 m Freestyle (13 Games - 1954, 58, 62, 66, 70, 74, 78, 82, 86, 90, 94, 98, 2002)
- Swimming, Women's 4 × 100 m Medley (10 Games - 1990, 94, 98, 2002, 06, 10, 14, 18, 22, 26)
- Swimming, Men's 1500 m Freestyle (9 Games - 1970, 74, 78, 82, 86, 90, 94, 98, 2002)
- Swimming, Women's 4 × 100 m Freestyle (8 Games - 1998, 2002, 06, 10, 14, 18, 22, 26)
- Men's Hockey (7 Games - 1998, 2002, 06, 10, 14, 18, 22)
- Swimming, Women's 100 m Freestyle (7 Games - 2002, 06, 10, 14, 18, 22, 26)

== Australian Records Achieved at Commonwealth Games ==
Record Types listed follow this Key:

- WR: World Record
- CR: Commonwealth Record
- AR: Australian Record
- GR: Games Record

=== Record Summary ===
This list shows a summary of known Australian records and totals for each year and overall. A world record also covers all other records (Commonwealth, Australian and Games) but is not included in each individual tally. This also goes for each other section overlapping. The hierarchy is defined by the record key.

Year	WR	CR	AR	GR	Total
2006	104			109	214
2002	6			44	50
1998				20	20
1994				29	29
1990				7	7
1986				6	6
1982				2	2
1978				1	1
1974				1	1
1970				3	3
1966				14	14
1962				5	5
1958				0	0
1954				3	3
1950				2	2
1938				0	0
1934				2	2
1930				0	0
**Total**	**6**			**139**	145

=== 2002 ===
- 6 World Records were set during these Games.
- 44 Commonwealth Games Records were set in the 2002 Games.

Type	Sport	Discipline	Athlete/Team	Record	Margin
WR	Cycling	4,000 m Team Pursuit (qualifying)	Team: Graeme Brown, Peter Dawson, Mark Renshaw, Luke Roberts	4:04.034	
WR	Cycling	4,000 m Team Pursuit	Team: Graeme Brown, Peter Dawson, Mark Renshaw, Luke Roberts	3:59.583	
WR	Swimming	50 m Freestyle Multi Disability (Heat)	Ben Austin	27.48	
WR	Swimming	100 m Freestyle Multi Disability (Heat)	Ben Austin	1:00.21	
WR	Swimming	100 m Freestyle Multi Disability (final)	Ben Austin	1:00.27	
WR	Swimming	400 m Freestyle	Ian Thorpe	3:40.08	
GR	Athletics	Men's 20 km Walk	Nathan Deakes	1:25.35 (hours)	
GR	Athletics	Women's 20 km Walk	Jane Saville	1:36.34 (hours)	
GR	Athletics	Women's 4 × 400 m Relay	Australia	3:25.63 (mins)	
GR	Athletics	Men's 50 km Walk	Nathan Deakes	3:52.40 (hours)	
GR	Athletics	Women's Marathon	Kerryn McCann	2:30.05 (hours)	
GR	Athletics	Women's Pole Vault	Tatiana Grigorieva	4.35 (meters)	
GR	Athletics	Men's shot put	Justin Anlezark	20.91 (meters)	
GR	Cycling	Men's 20 km Scratch Race	Graeme Brown	24:14.660 (mins)	
GR	Cycling	Women's 25 km Points Race	Katherine Bates	37 (points)	
GR	Cycling	Men's 4000 m Individual Pursuit	Bradley "Brad" McGee	4:16.358 (mins)	
GR	Cycling	Women's 500 m Time Trial	Kerrie Meares	35.084 (seconds)	
GR	Cycling	Men's Road Race (187.2 km)	Stuart O'Grady	4:43:17 (hours)	
GR	Cycling	Men's Road Time Trial (46.8 km)	Cadel Evans	1:00:53.50 (hours)	
GR	Cycling	Men's Team Sprint	Australia	44.506 (seconds)	
GR	Shooting	Women's 25 m Standard Pistol (Ind)	Lalita Yauhleuskaya	686.8 (points)	
GR	Shooting	Women's 25 m Standard Pistol (Team)	Australia	1150 (points)	
GR	Shooting	Men's 50 m Free Rifle-3 Position (Team)	Australia	2297 (points)	
GR	Shooting	Women's 50 m Rifle Prone (Ind)	Kim Frazer	588 (points)	
GR	Shooting	Women's Skeet (Ind)	Lauryn Ogilvie	93 (points)	
GR	Shooting	Women's Skeet (Team)	Australia	95 (points)	
GR	Shooting	Men's Trap (Team)	Australia	187 (points)	
GR	Shooting	Women's Trap (Team)	Australia	90 (points)	
GR	Swimming	Men's 100 m Backstroke	Matt Welsh	0:54.72 (mins)	
GR	Swimming	Men's 100 m Butterfly	Geoff Huegill	0:52.36 (mins)	
GR	Swimming	Women's 100 m Butterfly	Petria Thomas	0:58.57 (mins)	
GR	Swimming	Men's 100 m Freestyle	Ian Thorpe	48.73 (seconds)	
GR	Swimming	Men's 100 m Multi Disability Freestyle	Ben Austin	(mins)	
GR	Swimming	Men's 200 m Butterfly	Justin Norris	1:56.95 (mins)	
GR	Swimming	Men's 200 m Freestyle	Ian Thorpe	1:44.71 (mins)	
GR	Swimming	Men's 400 m Freestyle	Ian Thorpe	3:40.08 (mins)	
GR	Swimming	Men's 400 m Individual Medley	Justin Norris	4:16.95 (mins)	
GR	Swimming	Men's 4 × 100 m Freestyle Relay	Australia	3:16.42 (mins)	
GR	Swimming	Women's 4 × 100 m Freestyle Relay	Australia	3:40.41 (mins)	
GR	Swimming	Men's 4 × 100 m Medley Relay	Australia	3:36.05 (mins)	
GR	Swimming	Women's 4 × 100 m Medley Relay	Australia	4:03.70 (mins)	
GR	Swimming	Men's 4 × 200 m Freestyle Relay	Australia	7:11.69 (mins)	
GR	Swimming	Men's 50 m Backstroke	Matt Welsh	25.65 (seconds)	
GR	Swimming	Women's 50 m Backstroke	Dyana Calub	28.98 (seconds)	
GR	Swimming	Men's 50 m Butterfly	Geoff Huegill	23.57 (seconds)	
GR	Swimming	Women's 50 m Butterfly	Petria Thomas	26.66 (seconds)	
GR	Swimming	Men's 50 m Multi Disability Freestyle	Ben Austin	(seconds)	
GR	Weightlifting	Women's 75 kg+ Snatch	Caroline Pileggi	100.0 (kg)	
GR	Weightlifting	Men's 77 kg Snatch	Damian Brown	147.5 (kg)	
GR	Weightlifting	Men's 94 kg Snatch	Alex Karapetyn	167.5 (kg)	

=== 1998 ===
- 20 Commonwealth Games Records were set in the 1998 Games.

Type	Sport	Discipline	Athlete/Team	Record	Margin
GR	Athletics	Women's 10 km Road Walk	Jane Saville	43:57 (mins)	
GR	Cycling	Men's 184 km Road Race	Jay Sweet	4:31:56 (hours)	
GR	Cycling	Women's 24 km Points Race	Alayna Burns	34 (points)	
GR	Cycling	Women's Road Race (28 km)	Anna Wilson	37:34 (mins)	
GR	Cycling	Men's Sprint	Darryn Hill	10.533 (seconds)	
GR	Shooting	Women's Air Pistol (Ind)	Annemarie Forder	480.6 (points)	
GR	Shooting	Women's Air Pistol (Team)	Australia	748 (points)	
GR	Shooting	Men's Smallbore Rifle 3 Position (Ind)	Timothy Lowndes	1235.3 (points)	
GR	Shooting	Women's Smallbore Sport Rifle 3 Position (Ind)	Susan McCready	667.3 (points)	
GR	Shooting	Women's Smallbore Sport Rifle Prone (Team)	Australia	1174 (points)	
GR	Shooting	Women's Sport Pistol (Team)	Australia	1140 (points)	
GR	Swimming	Women's 200m Butterfly	Susie O'Neill	2:06.60 (mins)	
GR	Swimming	Men's 200m Individual Medley	Matthew Dunn	2:00.26 (mins)	
GR	Tenpin Bowling	Women's Doubles	Australia	3678 (points)	
GR	Tenpin Bowling	Mixed Doubles	Australia	3605 (points)	
GR	Tenpin Bowling	Women's Singles	Cara Honeychurch	6406 (points)	
GR	Weightlifting	Men's 77 kg Clean and Jerk	Damian Brown	187.5 (kg)	
GR	Weightlifting	Men's 77 kg Combined	Damian Brown	327.5 (kg)	
GR	Weightlifting	Men's 94 kg Clean and Jerk	Kiril Kounev	205.0 (kg)	
GR	Weightlifting	Men's 94 kg Combined	Kiril Kounev	370.0 (kg)	

=== 1994 ===
- 29 Commonwealth Games Records were set in the 1994 Games.

Type	Sport	Discipline	Athlete/Team	Record	Margin
GR	Athletics	Men's Marathon Wheelchair	Paul Wiggins	1:37.33 (hours)	
GR	Cycling	Men's 10 Mile	Stuart O'Grady	18:50.520 (mins)	
GR	Cycling	Men's 100 km Team Time Trial	Australia	1:53:19.13 (hours)	
GR	Cycling	Women's 25 km Team Time Trial	Australia	1:04:03.20 (mins)	
GR	Cycling	Men's 4000 m Team Pursuit	Australia	4:10.485 (mins)	
GR	Cycling	Men's 40 km Points Race	Brett Aitken	38 (points)	
GR	Cycling	Women's Road Race	Kathryn "Kathy" Watt	2:48:04.73 (seconds)	
GR	Shooting	Fullbore Rifle Queens Prize - Open (Pair)	Australia	593 (points)	
GR	Shooting	Men's Running Target (Ind)	Bryan Wilson	657.9 (points)	
GR	Shooting	Women's Smallbore Rifle Prone (Team)	Australia	1160 (points)	
GR	Shooting	Women's Sport Pistol (Ind)	Christine Trefry	679.4 (points)	
GR	Swimming	Women's 100 m Breaststroke	Samantha Riley	1:08.02 (mins)	
GR	Swimming	Women's 100 m Freestyle S9	Melissa Carlton	1:09.61 (mins)	
GR	Swimming	Men's 1500 m Freestyle	Kieren Perkins	14:41.66 (mins)	
GR	Swimming	Women's 200 m Breaststroke	Samantha Riley	2:25.53 (mins)	
GR	Weightlifting	Men's 108 kg + Clean and Jerk	Stefan Botev	200.0 (kg)	
GR	Weightlifting	Men's 108 kg + Combined	Stefan Botev	360.0 (kg)	
GR	Weightlifting	Men's 108 kg + Snatch	Steven Kettner	165.0 (kg)	
GR	Weightlifting	Men's 108 kg Clean and Jerk	Nicu Vlad	220.0 (kg)	
GR	Weightlifting	Men's 108 kg Combined	Nicu Vlad	405.0 (kg)	
GR	Weightlifting	Men's 108 kg Snatch	Nicu Vlad	185.0 (kg)	
GR	Weightlifting	Men's 64 kg Combined	Sevdalin Marinov	277.5 (kg)	
GR	Weightlifting	Men's 76 kg Clean and Jerk	Damian Brown	182.5 (kg)	
GR	Weightlifting	Men's 83 kg Clean and Jerk	Kiril Kounev	200.0 (kg)	
GR	Weightlifting	Men's 83 kg Combined	Kiril Kounev	352.5 (kg)	
GR	Weightlifting	Men's 83 kg Snatch	Kiril Kounev	152.5 (kg)	
GR	Weightlifting	Men's 91 kg Clean and Jerk	Harvey Goodman	200.0 (kg)	
GR	Weightlifting	Men's 91 kg Combined	Harvey Goodman	362.5 (kg)	
GR	Weightlifting	Men's 91 kg Snatch	Harvey Goodman	162.5 (kg)	

=== 1990 ===
- 7 Commonwealth Games Records were set in the 1990 Games.

Type	Sport	Discipline	Athlete/Team	Record	Margin
GR	Athletics	Men's Hammer Throw	Sean Carlin	75.66 (meters)	
GR	Athletics	Women's Heptathlon	Jane Flemming	6695 (points)	
GR	Cycling	Men's 50 km Points Race	Robert Burns	81 (points)	
GR	Cycling	Women's Road Race (72 km)	Kathryn "Kathy" Watt	1:55:11.60 (hours)	
GR	Shooting	Men's 50 m/Free Pistol (Team)	Australia	1106 (points)	
GR	Swimming	Women's 400 m Individual Medley	Hayley Lewis	4:42.65 (mins)	
GR	Weightlifting	Men's 75 kg Clean and Jerk	Ronald Laycock	177.5 (kg)	

=== 1986 ===
- 6 Commonwealth Games Records were set in the 1986 Games.

Type	Sport	Discipline	Athlete/Team	Record	Margin
GR	Athletics	Men's 30 km Road Walk	Simon Francis Baker	2:07.47 (hours)	
GR	Athletics	Women's shot put	Gael Martin (née Mulhall)	19.00 (meters)	
GR	Rowing	Men's Eight Oared Shell	Australia	5:44.42 (mins)	
GR	Rowing	Women's Eight Oared Shell	Australia	6:43.69 (mins)	
GR	Rowing	Men's Lightweight Single Sculls	Peter Antonie	7:16.43 (mins)	
GR	Rowing	Women's Lightweight Single Sculls	Adair Ferguson	7:45.49 (mins)	

=== 1978 ===
- 2 Commonwealth Games Records were set in the 1978 Games.

Type	Sport	Discipline	Athlete/Team	Record	Margin
GR	Cycling	Men's Road Race (117 miles)	Phillip Anderson	4:22:34.41 (hours)	
GR	Swimming	Women's 800 m Freestyle	Tracey Wickham	8:24.62 (mins)	

=== 1974 ===
- 1 Commonwealth Games Records were set in the 1974 Games.

Type	Sport	Discipline	Athlete/Team	Record	Margin
GR	Cycling	Men's Road Race (114 miles)	Clyde Sefton	5:07:16.87 (hours)	

=== 1970 ===
- 3 Commonwealth Games Records were set in the 1970 Games.

Type	Sport	Discipline	Athlete/Team	Record	Margin
GR	Athletics	Men's 20 Mile Walk	Noel Freeman	2:33:33 (hours)	
GR	Weightlifting	Men's 110 kg + Combined	Raymond Rigby	500 (kg)	
GR	Weightlifting	Men's 52 kg Combined	George Vasiliades	290 (kg)	

=== 1966 ===
- 14 Commonwealth Games Records were set in the 1966 Games.

Type	Sport	Discipline	Athlete/Team	Record	Margin
GR	Athletics	Women's 100 Yard Dash	Dianne Burge	10.6 (seconds)	
GR	Athletics	Men's 100 Yard Dash	Michael Van Der Velde	10.1 (seconds)	
GR	Athletics	Women's 440 Yard Run/Quarter Mile	Judith Pollock	53.0 (seconds)	
GR	Athletics	Women's 4×110 Yard Relay	Australia	45.3 (seconds)	
GR	Athletics	Men's 880 Yard Run/Half-Mile	Noel Clough	1:46.9 (mins)	
GR	Swimming	Men's 110 Yards Breaststroke	Ian O'Brien	1:08.2 (mins)	
GR	Swimming	Men's 110 Yards Freestyle	Michael Wenden	54.0 (seconds)	
GR	Swimming	Men's 220 Yard Backstroke	Peter Reynolds	2:12.0 (mins)	
GR	Swimming	Men's 220 Yards Breaststroke	Ian O'Brien	2:29.3 (mins)	
GR	Swimming	Men's 440 Yards Freestyle	Robert Windle	4:15.0 (mins)	
GR	Swimming	Women's 440 Yards Freestyle	Kathryn Wainwright	4:38.8 (mins)	
GR	Swimming	Men's 440 Yards Freestyle Relay	Australia	3:35.6 (mins)	
GR	Swimming	Men's 440 Yards Individual Medley	Peter Reynolds	4:50.8 (mins)	
GR	Swimming	Men's 880 Yards Freestyle Relay	Australia	7:59.5 (mins)	
GR	Weightlifting	Men's 82.5 kg Combined	George Vakakis	925.5 (pounds)	

=== 1962 ===
- 5 Commonwealth Games Records were set in the 1962 Games.

Type	Sport	Discipline	Athlete/Team	Record	Margin
GR	Athletics	Women's 880 Yard Run/Half-Mile	Dixie Willis	2:03.7 (mins)	
GR	Swimming	Men's 110 Yards Butterfly	Kevin Berry	0:59.5 (mins)	
GR	Swimming	Women's 110 Yards Freestyle	Dawn Fraser	0:59.5 (seconds)	
GR	Swimming	Men's 1650 Yards Freestyle	Murray Rose	17:18.1 (mins)	
GR	Swimming	Men's 220 Yards Butterfly	Kevin Berry	2:10.8 (mins)	

=== 1958 ===
- 3 Commonwealth Games Records were set in the 1958 Games.

Type	Sport	Discipline	Athlete/Team	Record	Margin
GR	Athletics	Women's 220 Yard Dash	Marlene Mathews-Willard	23.6 (seconds)	
GR	Athletics	Women's 80 m H	Norma Thrower	10.7 (seconds)	
GR	Rowing	Men's Singles Sculls	Stuart Mackenzie	7:20.1 (mins)	

=== 1950 ===
- 2 Commonwealth Games Records were set in the 1950 Games.

Type	Sport	Discipline	Athlete/Team	Record	Margin
GR	Athletics	Women's 440 yard relay	Australia	47.9 (seconds)	
GR	Athletics	Women's 660 Yard Relay	Australia	1:13.4 (mins)	

=== 1934 ===
- 2 Commonwealth Games Records were set in the 1934 Games.

Type	Sport	Discipline	Athlete/Team	Record	Margin
GR	Swimming	Men's 1500 Yards Freestyle	Noel Ryan	18:25.4 (mins)	
GR	Swimming	Women's 200 Yards Breaststroke	Clare Dennis	2:50.2 (mins)	

== See also ==
- Category:Commonwealth Games competitors for Australia
- Commonwealth Games Australia
