= 2018 Commonwealth Games closing ceremony =

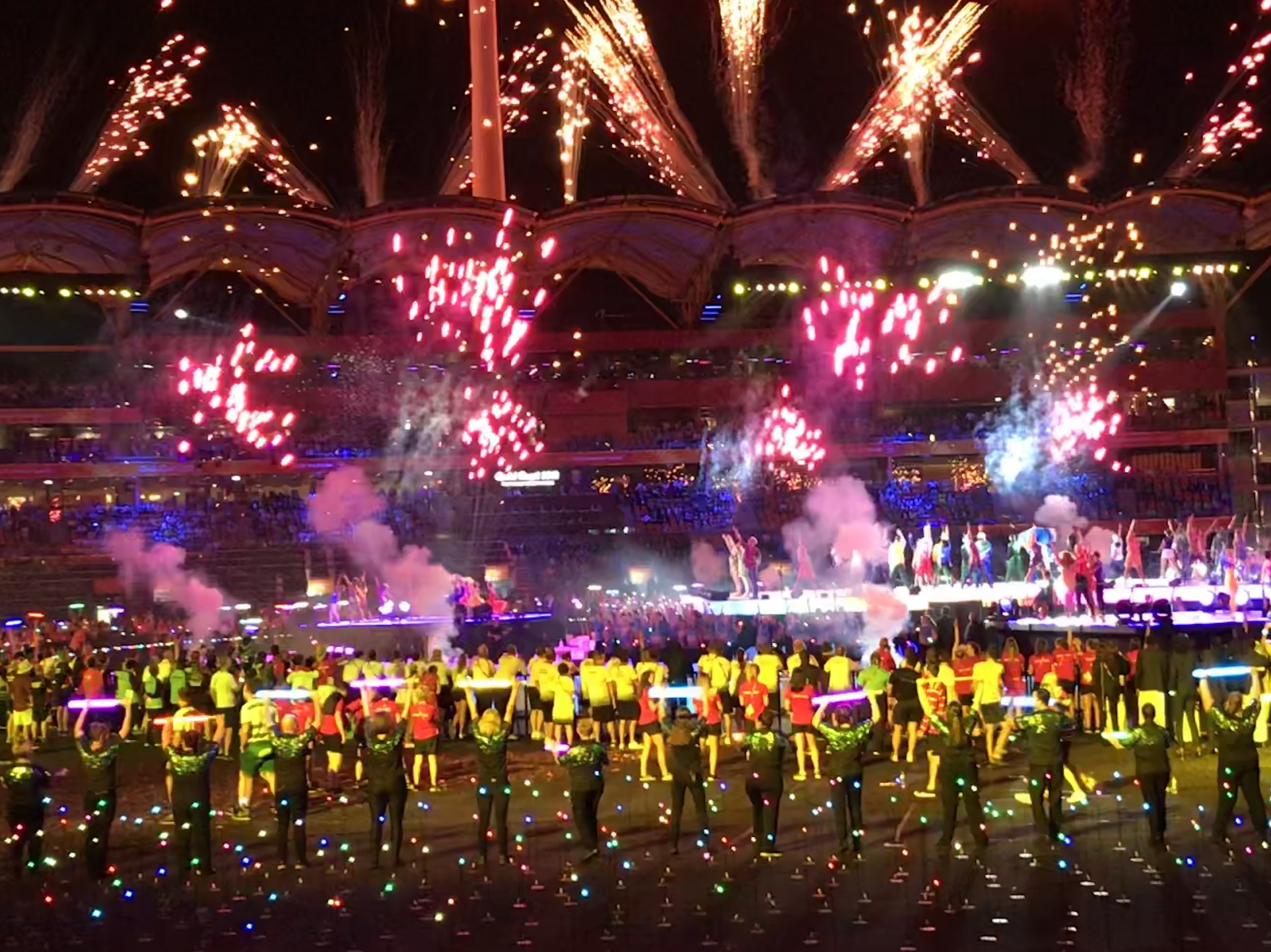
The 2018 Commonwealth Games closing ceremony at Carrara stadium

The closing ceremony for the 2018 Commonwealth Games was held on 15 April 2018 in the Carrara stadium, Gold Coast. The worldwide broadcast began at 20:30 and finished at 22:30 AEST, lasting almost two hours. The athletes entered the stadium before the broadcast began, a decision which attracted criticism. In reality, this early entrance was not without recent precedent and in reality, a 10-minute 'salute to the athletes of the Commonwealth' had been planned and rehearsed with the athletes and crowd in the stadium before the broadcast began - intended as a surprise to the broadcast audience. However, due to a very low turnout of athletes on the night, the sequence, which was to feature Usain Bolt DJ ing as the cast and athletes danced for the crowd had to be curtailed. Channel 7 was particularly virulent in its criticism. It was later revealed that many athletes elected not to attend the ceremony in favour of attending a party being hosted elsewhere by the channel.

== Dignitaries in attendance ==
- (United Kingdom) Prince Edward, Earl of Wessex - Vice Patron of the Commonwealth Games Federation
- Louise Martin - President of the Commonwealth Games Federation
- (Australia) Annastacia Palaszczuk - Premier of Queensland
- (Australia) Tom Tate - Mayor of Gold Coast
- Sam Coffa - President of Commonwealth Games Australia
- (England) Anne Underwood - Lord Mayor of Birmingham
- Ian Metcalfe - Chairman of Commonwealth Games England

== Program ==
=== Singers performance ===
The closing ceremony started with a performance of Australian singer Amy Shark. She performed the song "Let Love Rule". She then introduced Australian musician Archie Roach and together with the youth choir continued the performance. Then thirteen year old poet Solli Raphael recited a poem about the Games. He is known for winning the Australian Poetry Slam competition in 2017 and is the youngest ever to win the competition. Australian singer Ricki-Lee Coulter performed her song "All We Need is Love". She also performed in the opening ceremony with her song "Technicolor Love". After her, Australian boy group The Koi Boys gave a performance. Anthony Callea performed the song "You Should Be Dancing" originally by the Bee Gees. After him, Jamaican sprinter Usain Bolt appeared as DJ along with Games mascot Borobi in the middle of the stage.

=== Speeches ===
==== Peter Beattie ====
Gold Coast Commonwealth Games Corporation (GOLDOC) chairman Peter Beattie gave a speech:

What fantastic Games we have had. We have made history. We have shown the world what is means to be an Australian, Queenslander and Gold Coaster. Gold Coast 2018 will be remembered for many reasons. It will be remembered for firsts. These Games will be remembered for equal medals for women and men. These Games saw the full and authentic introduction of para-athletes. These Games saw recognition of our aboriginal people. The Commonwealth Games are extraodinary. They are a way for us to come together and share what we have in common. These Games will be remembered for the passion and commitment of so many people.....

— Peter Beattie, GOLDOC Chairman

He also praised the athletes, volunteers, the CGF and wished good luck to the Birmingham 2022 committee. After him, the David Dixon Award was presented by the CGF president Louise Martin to New Zealand weightlifter David Liti who won gold at the Men's +105 kg weightlifting event at the 2018 Commonwealth Games.

==== Louise Martin ====
Following the David Dixon award presentation, Louise Martin gave a speech about the conduct of the Games:

Gold Coast 2018 will forever be remembered as 'the Games of Firsts'. When I spoke at the opening of the Games 11 days ago, I asked the assembled athletes to grasp the opportunity of the Commonwealth Games and create their own history and fulfil their dreams. I must sincerely thank and congratulate them for rising so magnificently to this challenge.....

9 World Records and 83 Games Records were broken. From the first ever medals for Commonwealth islands and states; the first ever Jamaican Lawn Bowls team, the "Reggae Rollers", or the first-ever Ugandan netball team competing so strongly - these captivating stories, and the many others we witnessed here in Australia, are what Commonwealth sport is all about. It is what sets us apart in the world of sport and confirms that the 'Friendly Games' is alive and well, indeed more relevant than ever before....

The inspiring and impactful performances of our Commonwealth athletes have delivered on the promise of a historic collection of 'firsts' that were achieved in the run up to Games; whether that be the ground-breaking Reconciliation Action Plan, the equal number of medals for men and women for the first time, or the largest ever fully-integrated para-sport programme seen in Commonwealth and world sport.....

— Louise Martin, President of the CGF

Martin also announced that the Games mascot Borobi should remain active after the Games in order to support and raise funds for the Yugambeh community.

==== Ananstacia Palaszczuk ====
After Martin, Premier of Queensland Ananstacia Palaszczuk gave a speech:

.....What we have seen the past two weeks is the beginning of Queensland's golden age. Nothing can stop us now. This should be the model for all Games to come. The world has seen Queensland at its best - where life is beautiful one day and perfect the next. You will always have friends right here in Queensland, thank you.

— Annastacia Palaszczuk, Premier of Queensland

The commonwealth Games ceremonial flag was passed from Tom Tate, Mayor of Gold Coast to Sam Coffa, President of Commonwealth Games Australia, to Louise Martin, President of the Commonwealth Games Federation, to Ian Metcalfe, Chairman of Commonwealth Games England and finally to Anne Underwood, Lord Mayor of Birmingham. Gold Coast Mayor Tom Tate presented his speech to the audience and thanked the volunteers for their support and wished good luck to the Birmingham 2022 committee. President of Commonwealth Games Australia Sam Coffa presented his speech and praised Gold Coast city and the athletes of the Games. He then offered his thanks to the people of Gold Coast for their support.

==== Anne Underwood ====
Lord Mayor of Birmingham Anne Underwood gave her speech and told the crowd:

We are young and diverse city - we will showcase our city's youth and diversity

— Lord Mayor of Birmingham Anne Underwood

=== Birmingham handover ===
After her speech ended, a video about Birmingham's life and culture was shown in the screens of the stadium. The video showed the skyline of Birmingham city, its street markets, active youth, shopping streets, bars, pubs, Birmingham New Street railway station, trams and spaghetti junction. In the video, a man and a girl was shown dancing in one of the pubs of Birmingham and said ''a night you never forget, in a city that never sleeps''. The video ended with displaying the word #BRUM. Lady Sanity, a rap artist from Birmingham, then performed with her song ''Go The Distance''. After this, Amerah Saleh performed her poem "Tourist in My City" from what appeared to be the same location, but turned out to be Birmingham as she finished and walked into a six-minute one-take live dance performance to Electric Light Orchestra's "Mr. Blue Sky".

- Australian recording artists such as Amy Shark, Anthony Callea, Dami Im, Deborah Conway, Guy Sebastian, Kate Ceberano, Ricki-Lee Coulter, Samantha Jade and The Veronicas performed at the ceremony.
- Prince Edward, Earl of Wessex, declared the Games closed and passed the Commonwealth Games flag to Birmingham, England which will host the 2022 Games.
