= James Taylor (sports administrator) =

James 'Pa' Taylor CBE (1 December 1871 – 27 June 1944) was an Australian sports administrator and International Olympic Committee member.

== Personal ==
Taylor was born on 1 December 1871 in Kempsey, New South Wales. He was educated at Balmain School and University of Sydney. He was a chartered accountant and was a director of several companies including Cessnock Collaries Ltd and Electric Light and Power Company Pyd Ltd. He died in Sydney, New South Wales on 27 June 1944. He was married to Flora and they had a daughter Dorothy.

== Career as a sports administrator ==
Taylor played several sports in his younger days including cricket, rowing, swimming and water polo. In 1908, he became President of the New South Wales Amateur Swimming Association and in 1909 the President of the Australian Swimming Union. In 1920, he became the inaugural Chairman of the Australian Olympic Federation. He held all these positions until his death in 1944.

In 1924, Taylor was one of ten NOCs leaders invited as guests to the International Olympic Committee (IOC) Session held during the 1924 Paris Olympics. In 1924, he became Australia's second IOC member with Richard Coombes. It was reported that Taylor's IOC membership led to a strained relationship with Coombes who previously had exclusive control of his country's Olympic affairs. As of 2015, Taylor is one of only three to have held the simultaneous posts of AOC President/Chairman and IOC member, the others being Kevan Gosper and John Coates.

Taylor represented Australia at a meeting on 14 July 1928 in London that led to the formation of the Empire Sports Federation. The Federation established the British Empire Games, the first being held in Hamilton, Canada in 1930.

== Honours ==
- 1927 – Chevalier of the Legion of Honour of France
- 1933 – The Order of the British Empire – Commander (Civil)
- 1993 – Sport Australia Hall of Fame inductee
