= Harold Alderson =

Australian sports administrator (1890–1978)

Sir Harold George Alderson, circa 1965

Sir Harold George Alderson MBE CStJ (18 August 1890 – 4 October 1978) was an Australian sports administrator including President of the Australian Olympic Federation and Australian British Empire & Commonwealth Games Association.

== Personal ==
Alderson was born 18 August 1890 at Balmain, a suburb in the Inner West of Sydney. He was the second child of James Bull Alderson, architect, and his wife Lilias Maud, née Smith. Alderson attended Mosman Public School and Fort Street Model School. In 1919, he opened a public accountancy business in the city. He died on 4 October 1978 at Mosman and was survived by his second wife Hilda Nancy Buddee and a daughter.

== Sports administration career ==
=== Rowing ===
In 1911, Alderson became a member of the Mosman Rowing Club and in 1915 was the club captain. He then became involved in the New South Wales Rowing Association. He was Secretary from 1918 to 1920, chairman from 1920 to 1970 and president from 1970 to 1978. He was Secretary of the Anniversary Regatta Committee for over 50 years from 1920. From 1927 to 1972, he was the New South Wales Councillor on the Australian Amateur Rowing Council Board. Alderson was a regular rowing contributor to The Sydney Morning Herald.

=== Olympic Games ===
Alderson had an extensive involvement in the Australian Olympic movement and one journalist referred to him as "Mr Olympics". He was President of the New South Wales Olympic Council from 1926 to 1970. In 1936, he was Vice President of the Australian Olympic Federation (AOF) and became President of the Australian Olympic Federation (AOF) in 1946, a position held 1973 when he was replaced by Edgar Tanner. Alderson stepped down as President at the age eighty-two. He was General Manager of the Australian team at the 1936 Berlin Olympics. In his official report on the Games, Alderson stated the need for the construction of cinder tracks and indoor swimming pools in Australia. Harry Gordon wrote that he "returned disillusioned by the intrusion of nationalism and professionalism into the Olympics". Alderson believed that Australia should focus n the British Empire Games rather than the Olympics. As President of the AOF, he played an important role in Melbourne's bid for the 1956 Summer Olympics as he was a member of the four-man bid delegation.

In 1973, just prior to retiring lamented that the Olympics were becoming a contest between nations to provide the biggest Games. After his death, Sydney Grange, AOF Chairman said: "Sir Harold had contributed more to the Olympic movement in Australia than any other individual. As Chairman for some 30 years he steered the federation through many Olympics."

=== Commonwealth Games ===
Alderson was Chairman of the various Australian Commonwealth Games Committee's from 1949 to 1973.

Alderson's served on the 1938, 1962 and 1966 British Empire Games and Commonwealth Games Committees.

Alderson also served as Chairman of the New South Wales Sports Club, Rothmans Sports Foundation and New South Wales Council of National Fitness. Alderson was the honorary treasurer of the St John Ambulance Australia New South Wales Division for over 30 years.

== Honours ==
- 1938 Birthday Honours Appointed Member of the Order of the British Empire (MBE), for role General Manager of the Australian team at the 1936 Berlin Olympics.
- 1956 Birthday Honours - Knighted for services to amateur sport.
- 1959 - Appointed Commander of the Order of St John.
- 1997 - Sport Australia Hall of Fame Awards inductee.
- Life Member of the Australian Olympic Committee.
- Life Member of the New South Wales Olympic Council.
- Life Member of Commonwealth Games Australia.
