= Electoral results for the district of Ripponlea =

Victoria, Australia, district election results

This is a list of electoral results for the electoral district of Ripponlea in Victorian state elections.

== Members for Ripponlea ==
Member	Party	Term
Edgar Tanner	Liberal	1955–1967

== Election results ==
1964 Victorian state election: Ripponlea
Party	Candidate	Votes	%	±%
Liberal and Country	Edgar Tanner	8,416	48.7	+1.0
Labor	Anthony Fisher	6,690	38.7	+3.6
Democratic Labor	Joseph O'Leary	2,165	12.5	−4.7
Total formal votes		17,271	96.5	−0.2
Informal votes		619	3.5	+0.2
Turnout		17,890	90.7	−0.1
Two-party-preferred result
Liberal and Country	Edgar Tanner	10,298	59.6	−0.8
Labor	Anthony Fisher	6,973	40.4	+0.8
Liberal and Country hold		Swing	−0.8	

1961 Victorian state election: Ripponlea
Party	Candidate	Votes	%	±%
Liberal and Country	Edgar Tanner	8,166	47.7	−2.4
Labor	Steven Goldberg	6,009	35.1	+0.4
Democratic Labor	Michael Cunneen	2,946	17.2	+2.0
Total formal votes		17,121	96.7	−0.4
Informal votes		589	3.3	+0.4
Turnout		17,710	90.8	+0.5
Two-party-preferred result
Liberal and Country	Edgar Tanner	10,343	60.4	−2.6
Labor	Steven Goldberg	6,778	39.6	+2.6
Liberal and Country hold		Swing	−2.6	

=== Elections in the 1950s ===
1958 Victorian state election: Ripponlea
Party	Candidate	Votes	%	±%
Liberal and Country	Edgar Tanner	9,015	50.1	
Labor	Jack Kagan	6,250	34.7	
Democratic Labor	Dermot O'Neill	2,742	15.2	
Total formal votes		18,007	97.1	
Informal votes		536	2.9	
Turnout		536	2.9	
Two-party-preferred result
Liberal and Country	Edgar Tanner	11,346	63.0	
Labor	Jack Kagan	6,661	37.0	
Liberal and Country hold		Swing		

- Two party preferred vote was estimated.

1955 Victorian state election: Ripponlea
Party	Candidate	Votes	%	±%
Liberal and Country	Edgar Tanner	6,799	44.2	
Labor (A-C)	George Miller	4,121	26.8	
Victorian Liberal	Thomas Hollway	3,723	24.2	
Communist	Ted Laurie	750	4.9	
Total formal votes		15,393	94.3	
Informal votes		933	5.7	
Turnout		16,326	90.6	
Two-candidate-preferred result
Liberal and Country	Edgar Tanner	9,722	63.1	
Labor (A-C)	George Miller	5,671	36.9	
Liberal and Country gain from Victorian Liberal		Swing		
