= Ray Godkin =

Australian sports administrator (1934–2025)

Raymond George Godkin OAM (1934 – 7 July 2025) was an Australian sports administrator particularly in the sport of cycling. He was President of the Australian Cycling Federation and the Australian Commonwealth Games Association.

== Background ==
Godkin was born in Sydney in 1934. After leaving school, he was apprenticed in the engineering field. He joined the New South Wales Police at the age of 26. In 1982, he assisted in establishing the N.S.W. Police Accident Investigation Squad and retired in 1989 at the age of 55 to concentrate on his cycling administration roles. He was awarded National Medals for his policing career.

Godkin died on 7 July 2025, at the age of 90.

== Sport administration ==
=== Cycling ===
Godkin started cycling at the age of 16 and he competed as both a professional and amateur until the age of 42.. He won the 1976 Muswellbrook to Tamworth cycle race. His brother Barry represented Australia in track cycling at the 1962 British Empire and Commonwealth Games. In the 1970s Godkin became involved in New South Wales cycling administration. In 1985, he was elected President of the Australian Cycling Federation and held this position until 2000. He played a major role in the track cycling being added to being added to Australian Institute of Sport in 1987. From 1995 to 2000, he was the Cycling Competition Manager for the Sydney Organising Committee for the Olympic Games.

He was Treasurer of International Amateur Cycling Federation (FIAC), the international body controlling amateur cycling following the 1992 Barcelona Olympic Games and was a major contributor in the merger of the professional body with FIAC to form the UCI. He became Senior Vice President of the UCI for the period 2000 to 2008.

=== Olympic Games ===
Godkin was Section Manager for the Australian cycling team at the 1984 Los Angeles Olympics and 1988 Seoul Olympics. He was a member of the Australian Olympic Committee Board for one term in the 1990s.

=== Commonwealth Games ===
Godkin was the Cycling Manager for the Australian Team at the 1982 Commonwealth Games and Transport Officer for the Australian Team at the 1986 Commonwealth Games. He was Technical Delegate for cycling at nine Commonwealth Games.From 1987 to 1998, he was Chairman of the Australian Commonwealth Games Association.

== Recognition ==
- 1980 – National Medal for NSW Police Force service
- 1986 – National Medal - 1st Clasp
- 1986 – Life Member New South Wales Cycling
- 1989 – Medal of the Order of Australia for services to cycling
- 1999 – Life Member Cycling Australia
- 2000 – Australian Sports Medal
- 2015 – Cycling Australia Hall of Fame inductee
- Life Member Australian Commonwealth Games Association
