= Australian Olympic Foundation =

The Australian Olympic Foundation is a foundation established to help future Australian athletes develop and compete at an Olympic level.

In February 1996, the Foundation was constituted by Deed of Settlement between Julius L Patching as Settlor and the Australian Olympic Foundation Limited (ACN 071 220 025) an Australian Public Company, Limited By Guarantee. as Trustee.

The members and Directors of the Australian Olympic Foundation Limited are the voting members of the Executive of the Australian Olympic Committee.

The Foundation has been constituted and is controlled and administered so as to develop and protect the Olympic Movement in Australia in accordance with the Olympic Charter including, in particular, funding the preparation and participation of the Australian Teams in the Olympic Games, Olympic Winter Games and Regional Games and the costs and expenses of the AOC.

The Foundation's Annual Report for 2006 showed that as at 31 December 2006, the Foundation’s investments in managed funds were valued at $137 million with the Foundation’s net assets totalling $132.8 million

== See also ==
- Australian Olympic Committee
