= Arthur Tunstall =

Australian sport administrator

Arthur Tunstall OBE (22 February 1922 – 11 February 2016) was an Australian and international sport administrator, particularly in relation to boxing and the Commonwealth Games. His Sport Australia Hall of Fame citation read that he was a "pioneer voluntary Australian sports administrator and the key person in amateur boxing and the Australian Commonwealth Games movement across the second half of last century."

== Personal ==
Tunstall was born in 1922 in Australia. He left school at the age of 14 and by the age of 16, he was working as a scale-making apprentice. At 25, he purchased a sandwich shop. After 19 years, he moved into insurance, which he sold for 14 years. He met his wife Peggy at Redleaf Pool, Double Bay and they were married for 67 years until her death in January 2013. Peggy's support for her husband's work resulted in her being made a life member of the Australian Commonwealth Games Association and being awarded the Medal of the Order of Australia. He lived in the Sydney suburb of Double Bay for most of his life.

== Sport administration ==
=== Boxing ===
Tunstall became involved in boxing through the (now long-defunct) recreation centre in Double Bay. It was where he met Les Duff, the president of the NSW Amateur Boxing Association (NSWABA), who suggested that he should apply for the association's upcoming secretary position. As Tunstall commented: "I got that job and held it for 60 bloody years!". Tunstall was a lllMember of the NSWABA for 59 years and the honorary secretary for 46 years. During these years he has attended hundreds of boxing tournaments acting as referee, judge, coach, and arena manager. For 46 years from 1953, he was honorary secretary and treasurer of the Amateur Boxing Union of Australia (ABUA).

Tunstall held several high level positions in regional boxing associations. In 1968, he was the inaugural honorary secretary of the Oceania Amateur Boxing Association (OABA) and in 1989 became its president. In 1978, when the Commonwealth Amateur Boxing Association was established, he was appointed honorary secretary. In 1989, he was elected to the position of vice-president of the Oceania Bureau by the International Amateur Boxing Association (AIBA), and was appointed as the chairman of the Technical and Rules Commission.

He was appointed as technical delegate at three Summer Olympics – 1988 Seoul, 1992 Barcelona, and 1996 Atlanta. No other person on the International Association has been chosen for this position three times. He was also technical delegate at World Championships, Junior World Championships twice and the Commonwealth Games. In 1991, he was chairman of the 6th World Amateur Boxing Championships in Sydney.

Tunstall's contribution to boxing was wide-ranging, from being manager of numerous Australian teams to Olympic Games, Commonwealth Games and World Championships, senior management positions in Australian amateur boxing associations to refereeing and judging. The Arthur Tunstall Trophy is presented to the best boxer at each Australian Amateur Boxing Championships. In 2013, AIBA awarded Tunstall the AIBA Order of Merit, only the second person to receive this award.

=== Australian Commonwealth Games Association ===
In 1969, Tunstall became secretary and treasurer of the Australian Commonwealth Games Association and he held the position for 30 years until 1998. This position involved preparing and sending the Australian team to the Commonwealth Games. He was the Australian delegate on the Commonwealth Games Federation (CGF) from 1972 to 1998. In 1994, he was elected vice-president for Oceania on the CGF for a four-year term.

He held significant positions including chef de mission, general manager, assistant general manager, and transport officer on eight Australian teams to Commonwealth Games. His first Games were the 1962 Commonwealth Games in Perth. In 2013, Tunstall resigned as chairman/president of the Australian Commonwealth Games Association NSW Division (ACGA NSW), a position he had held for 24 years. He was on the ACGA NSW Division Executive Committee for 48 years.

== Controversy ==
Tunstall was one of Australia's most outspoken and controversial sport administrators. During the later part of his sport administration career, there were several decisions and comments that resulted in adverse public comment. At the 1990 Auckland Commonwealth Games, he suggested New Zealand be considered the seventh and eighth states of Australia. Four years later at the 1994 Victoria, Canada Commonwealth Games, he threatened to send Cathy Freeman home for carrying both the Australian and Aboriginal flags during her 200 m victory lap. Several years later, Tunstall and Freeman appeared together in a television commercial promoting tea. At the 1994 Games, athletes with a disability participated for the first time but Tunstall stated that they should have their own separate games after the able bodied Games.

In 2009, Tunstall was accused of discrimination and racism against indigenous boxers in the meeting to disband Boxing NSW. George Ptolemy claimed that, when he suggested a young Aboriginal boxer be sent to the Olympics, Tunstall replied: "We need people who know how to use a knife and fork." Tunstall responded to the allegations by stating: "There have been several indigenous boys that I've taken in for weeks and fed. To say I'm a racist is totally untrue. The real story is they [Boxing Australia] couldn't handle me telling it straight. They've wanted me out for ages and now they've finally succeeded."

== Death ==
Tunstall died at his son's residence on the South Coast of New South Wales on 11 February 2016.

== Recognition ==
Tunstall was recognised for his work, receiving several awards including:

- Australian Olympic Committee Life Member
- 1979 – Australian Commonwealth Games Association Life Member
- 1979 – Officer of the Order of the British Empire for services to boxing
- 1998 – Australian Commonwealth Games Association NSW Life Member
- 2000 – Australian Sports Medal
- 2005 – Sport Australia Hall of Fame Inductee
- 2013 – AIBA Order of Merit award

The Arthur Tunstall Trophy is presented to the best boxer of the tournament at each Australian Championships.
