= Bill Young (cycling) =

Australian cycling administrator

William John Robert Young MBE AM (1905 – 21 May 1994) was an Australian sports administrator particularly in the sport of cycling. He was Chair of Australian Commonwealth Games Association and managed Australian teams at the Olympic Games and Commonwealth Games.

== Sport Administration ==
=== Cycling ===
Before moving to Australia from South Africa in 1921, Young was a successful junior cyclist. He continued his cycling career in Australia. He became involved in cycling administration as the NSW Amateur Cyclist Union Secretary (1948-1957) and President/Chair (1958-1974) and Australian Amateur Cycling Union Secretary.

=== Olympic Games ===
Young was section manager for the Australian cycling team at the 1956 Melbourne Olympics and 1964 Tokyo Olympics. He was the assistant general manager, Australian Team at the 1968 Mexico Olympics. He was president of the New South Wales Olympic Council. He resigned from that position after the Australian Olympic Federation voted against boycotting the 1980 Moscow Olympics. Young in his resignation letter stated "Fundamentally I believe that the seriousness of world events is sufficient reason for the AOF to have heeded the advice of the government of the day. Nothing short of a full commitment should have been given to the Australian Government".

=== Commonwealth Games ===
Yong had a long administrative involvement with the Commonwealth Games movement in Australia. He was the Cycling Team Manager at 1954 Vancour Empie and Commonwealth Games; Australian Team General Manager at 1958 British Empire and Commonwealth Games (Honorary), 1966 British Empire and Commonwealth Games and 1974 Commonwealth Games; and Advance Party Member at 1970 Commonwealth Games and 1978 Commonwealth Games.

From 1977 to 1979, he was Chairman of the Australian Commonwealth Games Association.

== Recognition ==
- 1950 - Life Member of New South Wales Cycling
- 1968 - The Order of the British Empire - Member (Civil) (Imperial) for cycling
- 1979 - Life Member of Cycling Australia
- 1986 - Member of the Order of Australia - for service to sport, particularly through the Olympic and Commonwealth Games Associations
- Life Member of Australian Olympic Committee
- Life Member of Commonwealth Games Australia
