= Les Martyn =

Australian sports administrator (1932–2021)

Leslie "Les" John Martyn MBE (26 January 1932 – 31 August 2021) was an Australian sports administrator. He was President of the Australian Weightlifting Federation, Confederation of Australian Sport and the Australian Commonwealth Games Association.

== Sport Administration Career ==
=== Weightlifting ===
Martyn was one of first coaches of weightlifting in Australia. He was President of the Australian Weightlifting Federation 1971 to 1983. He was an Executive Board Member International Weightlifting Federation 1981 to 1994. He was President of the Oceania Weightlifting Federation from 1980 to 1983.

=== Confederation of Australian Sport ===
In 1976, Martyn played an important role in the establishment of the Confederation of Australian Sport which was an outcome of the poor performance of the Australian team at the 1976 Montreal Olympic Games. He was the chairman of the Development Committee and member on the Government Liaison Committee. He was president from 1983 to 1987. He was the inaugural chairman of the Australian Coaching Council.

=== Australian Commonwealth Games Association ===
Martyn was the Weightlifting Manager/Coach for the Australian Team at the 1966 British Empire and Commonwealth Games, Assistant General Manager at the 1974 British Commonwealth Games and General Manager at 1978 Commonwealth Games. He was Chairman of the Australian Commonwealth Games Association from 1979 to 1987. As Chairman, he played a significant role in the organisation of the 1982 Brisbane Commonwealth Games.

== Recognition ==
- 1978 - Order of the British Empire - Member (Civil)
- 1988 - Confederation of Australian Sport Life Member
- 1989 - General Member Sport Australia Hall of Fame
- 2000 - Australian Sports Medal
- Australian Weightlifting Hall of Fame
- Life Member Australian Commonwealth Games Association
- Life Member Oceania Weightlifting Federation
