= 2034 Commonwealth Games =

Upcoming multi-sport event

XXV Commonwealth Games
- Host city: TBD
- Country: TBD
- Nations: 74 Commonwealth teams (expected)

The 2034 Commonwealth Games, officially known as the XXV Commonwealth Games, will be held in 2034 for members of the Commonwealth. The host for this iteration of the Commonwealth Games is to be chosen in 2028.

== Host selection ==
Commonwealth Sport uses a collaborative host-selection process rather than its former traditional bidding model. Interested Commonwealth Games Associations work with Commonwealth Sport, government representatives and other stakeholders during a co-creation and feasibility phase before submitting detailed Games proposals. The proposals are assessed through a Commonwealth Sport-led evaluation process, after which its Executive Board recommends a preferred host to the organization's members. The final appointment is made by the Commonwealth Sport General Assembly. The process permits proposals involving a single city, several cities within one country, or multiple Commonwealth countries or territories.

Commonwealth Sport plans to open the formal selection process for the 2034 Games in November 2027 and choose a host during 2028, giving the successful candidate approximately six years to prepare.

== Interested bids ==
- New Zealand – In 2023, the New Zealand Olympic Committee announced its interest in hosting the 2034 Commonwealth Games. In April 2025, Commonwealth Sport confirmed that New Zealand had submitted an official expression of interest regarding its future Games pipeline, noting that the country had previously signalled interest in the 2034 Games. The country previously hosted the 1950 Games and 1990 Games in Auckland and the 1974 Games in Christchurch.
- Nigeria – Nigeria initially pursued the 2030 Commonwealth Games, submitting a formal proposal by the 31 August 2025 deadline. After the Games were awarded to Amdavad, Nigeria declared its intention to pursue the 2034 edition. In July 2026, Shehu Dikko, chair of Nigeria's National Sports Commission, called for the 2034 Games to be reserved for an African host. Commonwealth sports ministers subsequently expressed strong support for the Games to be hosted in Africa in 2034. Commonwealth Sport president Donald Rukare said, however, that an African candidate would not receive an automatic guarantee and would have to demonstrate that its proposal was affordable, sustainable and met the organization's hosting requirements. Abuja previously bid unsuccessfully for the 2014 Commonwealth Games, losing to Glasgow.
- East Africa – A multinational East African proposal has been discussed as a possible means of staging the Commonwealth Games in Africa for the first time. One suggested arrangement would have Kenya stage athletics and rugby sevens, Uganda stage swimming, Rwanda stage cycling and 3x3 basketball, and Tanzania stage boxing. In July 2026, Commonwealth Sport president Donald Rukare described the proposal as an interesting option and said the organization was prepared to consider flexible hosting models while preserving a satisfactory experience for athletes.
