= Bob Elphinston =

Robert "Bob" Alexander Elphinston OAM (born 25 September 1941) is a leading Australian and international sport administrator particularly in relation to basketball and the Olympic Games movement.

== Personal ==
Elphinston attended Sydney Technical High School and Sydney Teacher's College . He qualified as a physical education teacher. His wife Maureen Reilly, a past member of the Australian national women's basketball team, died in 2021. They had two children - Brett and Nicole.

== Basketball ==
Elphinston has made a significant contribution to basketball at state, national and international arena. He was introduced to basketball as a physical education teacher and went onto play for Paratels in the Sydney competition. He was heavily involved in the establishment of the Bankstown Basketball Association. This included the construction of seven court Bankstown Basketball Stadium in Sydney during his 17 year term as President. His basketball state level involvement commenced with being a NSW State selector and coach of junior and senior teams in the 1960s and 1970's including Head coach of the NSW women’s team, which became Australian Champions in 1975. in 1979, he was an inaugural director of the National Basketball League board.

He was manager of the Australian men's national team (Boomers) at the 1982 World Championships and 1984 Olympic Games. He was the Boomers team manager on thirty eight occasions. He was also founding president of the Australian Basketball Coaches Association.

Elphinston was elected President of Oceania Basketball and Vice President of FIBA in 2002 and then elected President of FIBA from 2006-2010, the first member from Oceania to hold this position. From 2010 to 2014, he was President of FIBA Oceania. He was International Basketball Foundation President from 2008-2014 and this included the establishment of FIBA’s House of Basketball in Switzerland.

== Olympic Games ==
He left his career as a physical education teacher to take up a position with the NSW Dept. of Sport.From 1983 to 1991, he was Director of the NSW State Sports Centre. In 1991, this experience and his basketball administration, led to him being appointed the General Manager for the Sydney Olympics 2000 Bid Company. The successful Sydney 2000 bid led to him being appointed Sydney Organising Committee for Olympic Games (SOCOG) General Manager for Sport - a position held to the end of the Games. This position was involved "overseeing the sports competition, the sports schedule, sport services, sport presentations, sport policy and operations, medical services, doping control, IOC relations and protocol, National Olympic Committees services and language services. During the Games, this accounted for over 7500 staff and volunteers."

Following the Sydney 2000 Olympic Games, he was appointed Australian Olympic Committee (AOC) Director of Sport & Operations. He was AOC Secretary-General from 2001 to 2004 and this included the Australian team administration director for the 2004 Athens Olympic Games.

Due to his experience with the Sydney 2000 Olympic Games, he was a employed as a consultant to Athens 2004, Beijing 2008 and London 2012 Olympic Games Organising Committees. Elphinston as three Olympic Winter Games - 1994 Lillehammer, 1998 Nagano, and 2002 Salt Lake City, and four Commonwealth Games - 1962 Perth, 1982 Brisbane, 1994 Victoria (Canada), and 1998 Kuala Lumpur.

== Recognition ==
- 2000 - Olympic Order by the President of the IOC, Juan Antonio Samaranch.
- 2002 - Medal of the Order of Australia (OAM) for service to sport through the Sydney Olympic 2000 Bid Company and the Sydney Organising Committee for the Olympic Games.
- 2006 - Sport Australia Hall of Fame General Member
- 2007 - Basketball Australia Hall of Fame inductee
- 2011 - Basketball NSW Hall of Fame inductee
- 2019 - Legend in the Basketball NSW Hall of Fame
