= Sydney Grange =

Australian sports administrator

Sydney Broadway Grange AO OBE MVO (28 August 1912 – 28 October 1996) was an Australian sports administrator and President of the Australian Olympic Federation.

== Personal ==
Grange was born on 28 August 1912 in Watford, England. He was one of six children. His family moved to Australia when he was nine months. He grew up in Five Dock, a suburb of Sydney and attended the local school. As a 16-year-old, he joined New South Wales Public service as a messenger boy. Grange then moved to the Mines Department as a clerk. During World War II, he served with the Royal Australian Air Force for five years in northern Australia. After the war, he worked in the Premier's Department and in the early 1960s was appointed the State's ceremonial officer. This position involved supervising important Head of State visits including four visits by Queen Elizabeth II. He retired in August 1974. In 1970, he was appointed a Member of the Royal Victorian Order (Fifth Class) for this work.

Grange lived in Manly, New South Wales and served as an alderman with Manly Council. He died on 28 October 1996 in Sydney, New South Wales shortly after suffering a stroke. Grange was survived by his wife Valerie and daughter Beverly.

== Career as a sports administrator ==
=== Swimming ===
Grange learned to swim in the Parramatta River which was near his home in Five Dock. At 17, he became the honorary secretary of the Abbotsford Swimming Club. Grange then became assistant registrar of the New South Wales Amateur Swimming Association. Grange was vice president of the Australian Swimming Union between 1963 and 1968 and was then honorary director until 1979. He was an Executive Board member for the International Swimming Federation from 1964 to 1984 and vice president from 1972 to 1984.

=== Olympics ===
Grange was the honorary secretary and treasurer of the NSW Olympic Council from 1948 to 1972. He was a member of the Australian Olympic Federation (AOF) Board between 1959 and 1985. He was vice president from 1972 to 1977 and president from 1977 to his retirement in 1985. In 1983, he was appointed the first and only honorary president of the AOF.

Grange attended four Olympics in administration roles for the Australian team: Swimming Section Manager at the 1952 Helsinki Olympics, Chef de Mission and General Manager at the 1960 Rome Olympics, and Director of Administration at the 1964 Rome Olympics and the 1968 Mexico Olympics. He was a member of the 1956 Melbourne Olympic Games Organising Committee.

Grange became president of the AOF after the Australian team failed to win a gold medal at the 1976 Montreal Olympics. He attacked critics of the Australian team for being obsessed by a gold medal complex. After taking on the position of president, Grange stated the need for organized training programs and preparation and lobbying the Australian Government for financial assistance.

During the 1970s and early 1980s, the Australian Olympic Federation was primarily administered by Grange as President and Julius Patching as secretary-general. Olympic historian Harry Gordon has rated their period of administration as one of the most effective partnerships in the history of Australian sports administration. The period encompassed the move from amateur to professional management of Olympic sport. In 1980, the Fraser government requested that Australian team boycott the 1980 Moscow Olympics. Gordon noted that Grange and Patching supported the boycott, probably due to their years of government service. However, after the AOF decided to attend, both Grange and Patching made every effort to ensure that Australia send its best possible team to Moscow.

Grange was a member of the Australian Commonwealth Games Association Board from 1969 to 1980. and a Chairman of the National Fitness Council.

== Honours ==
- 1956 - Life Member of the NSW Amateur Swimming Association
- 1957 - Order of the British Empire (OBE) - Officer (Civil)
- 1960 - Life Member of the NSW Olympic Council
- 1970 - Royal Victorian Order - Member of the Fifth Class (MVO5)
- 1976 - Life Member Swimming Australia
- 1978 - Life Member of the Australian Olympic Federation
- 1980 - Life Member of the Australian Commonwealth Games Association
- 1980 - Silver Medal of the Olympic Order
- 1983 - Honorary Life President Australian Olympic Committee
- 1984 - Officer of the Order of Australia
- 1985 - International Olympic Committee Olympic Order
- 1989 - Sport Australia Hall of Fame inductee
- Manly Pathway of Olympians
