= Craig Phillips (sports administrator) =

Australian sports administrator

Craig Phillips AM (born May 1960) is an Australian sports administrator. In 2015, he was appointed the chief executive officer at Australian Commonwealth Games Association (now known as Commonwealth Games Australia).

== Personal ==
Phillips involvement in sport started at a young age and in 1979 he represented Australia at Modern Pentathlon Junior World Championships. His educational qualifications include Diploma of Teaching at Australian College of Physical Education from 1978 to 1981 and Master of Business Administration from Southern Cross University from 1993 to 1999.

== Sports administration career ==
Phillips was employed by the New South Wales Department of Sport and Recreation for eight years before joining the Australian Olympic Committee in 1990. Phillips held senior leadership positions at the Australian Olympic Committee including Technical Director & Director of Sport (1990-2004) and Secretary-General (2005-2014). During this period, Sydney hosted the 2000 Summer Olympics and he played a major role in the management of twelve Australian Summer and Winter Olympic Teams from Barcelona 1992 to Sochi 2014. This led him to being the most capped Auistralian Olympic official. In June 2015, Phillips was appointed the chief executive officer, Commonwealth Games Australia replacing Perry Crosswhite who held the position for more than 20 years. He was a Board Member of the Gold Coast 2018 Commonwealth Games Corporation. In 2019, he was elected to the Commonwealth Games Federation Sports Committee.

== Recognition ==
- 2000 - Olympic Golden Rings Award for services to the Sydney 2000 Olympic Games
- 2010- Alumnus of the Year Award at the Southern Cross University Graduate College of Management
- 2018 - Australian Institute of Sport Leadership Award
- 2021 - Member of the Order of Australia (AM) - For significant service to high-profile sporting organisations through executive roles.
