= Jim Eve =

James Sydney Wallace Eve, MBE (23 October 1899 – 24 August 1978) was an Australian sports administrator and former Honorary Secretary-Treasurer of the Australian Olympic Federation and Australian British Empire & Commonwealth Games Association.

== Personal ==
Eve was born on 23 October 1899 in Parramatta, New South Wales. His father was Albert Sydney Eve and mother Fredda Cavill, the daughter of Fred Cavill. Fred Cavill was known as the professor of swimming. Eve's youngest brother was Dick Eve who won the gold medal in the plain high diving competition at the 1924 Paris Olympics. Eve was educated at Neutral Bay and Manly commercial public schools. In 1915, he attended Alamada High School in San Francisco, California. He worked as a clerk and company secretary. He died on 24 August 1978 in Royal Prince Alfred Hospital, Sydney.

== Sports administration ==
=== Swimming ===
Eve and his brother Dick were members of the Manly Amateur Swimming Club. Whilst living in the United States, he competed in swimming and diving competitions. In 1917, he started his sports administration career with the New South Wales Amateur Swimming Association.

=== Olympics ===
He paid his own way to accompany the Australian team to the 1924 Paris Olympics. In 1924, he was appointed the honorary secretary-treasurer of the Australian Olympic Federation. Eve managed the Australian team at the 1932 Los Angeles Olympics. As secretary-treasurer, he assisted in organising the Australian teams for the 1928 Amsterdam Olympics and 1936 Berlin Olympics. In 1947, he retired as secretary-treasurer and was replaced by Edgar Tanner. Eve was a member of the organising committee for the 1956 Melbourne Olympics.

=== British Empire Games/Commonwealth Games ===
In 1929, he was a foundation secretary of Australian British Empire Games Association. He assisted in organizing the Australian teams at the 1930 Hamilton Games and 1934 London Games. He was organizing secretary for the 1938 Sydney Games. He retired as secretary of Australian Commonwealth Games Association in 1969.

=== Other ===
Eve was a co-organiser of the first Australian National Games held Melbourne in 1932. Eve helped to establish the Balgowlah Golf Club in 1926 and was full-time secretary of Oaklands Golf Club from 1946 to 1956.

== Honours ==
- 1951 – Member of the Order of the British Empire
- Life Member of the Australian Olympic Committee
- Life Member of the Commonwealth Games Australia
- Life Member of the New South Wales Sports Club.
