= 2030 Commonwealth Games =

Upcoming multi-sport event in Ahmedabad, India

XXIV Commonwealth Games
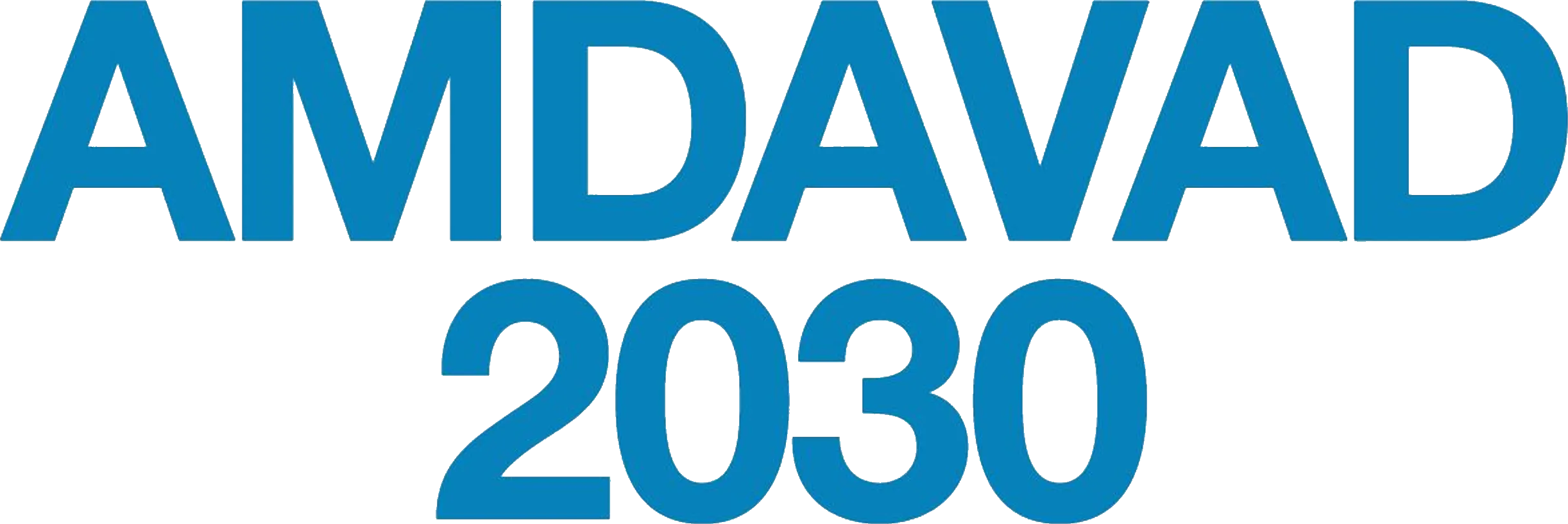
- Host city: Ahmedabad, India
- Nations: 74 Commonwealth teams (expected)
- Opening: TBA
- Main venue: Narendra Modi Stadium

The 2030 Commonwealth Games, officially known as the XXIV Commonwealth Games and commonly known as Amdavad 2030, is a planned multi-sport event scheduled to take place in Ahmedabad, Gujarat, India, in October 2030. This will be the second Commonwealth Games to be hosted in India, following the 2010 Games in Delhi, and the third in Asia. It will also be the centenary edition of the event.

== Host selection ==
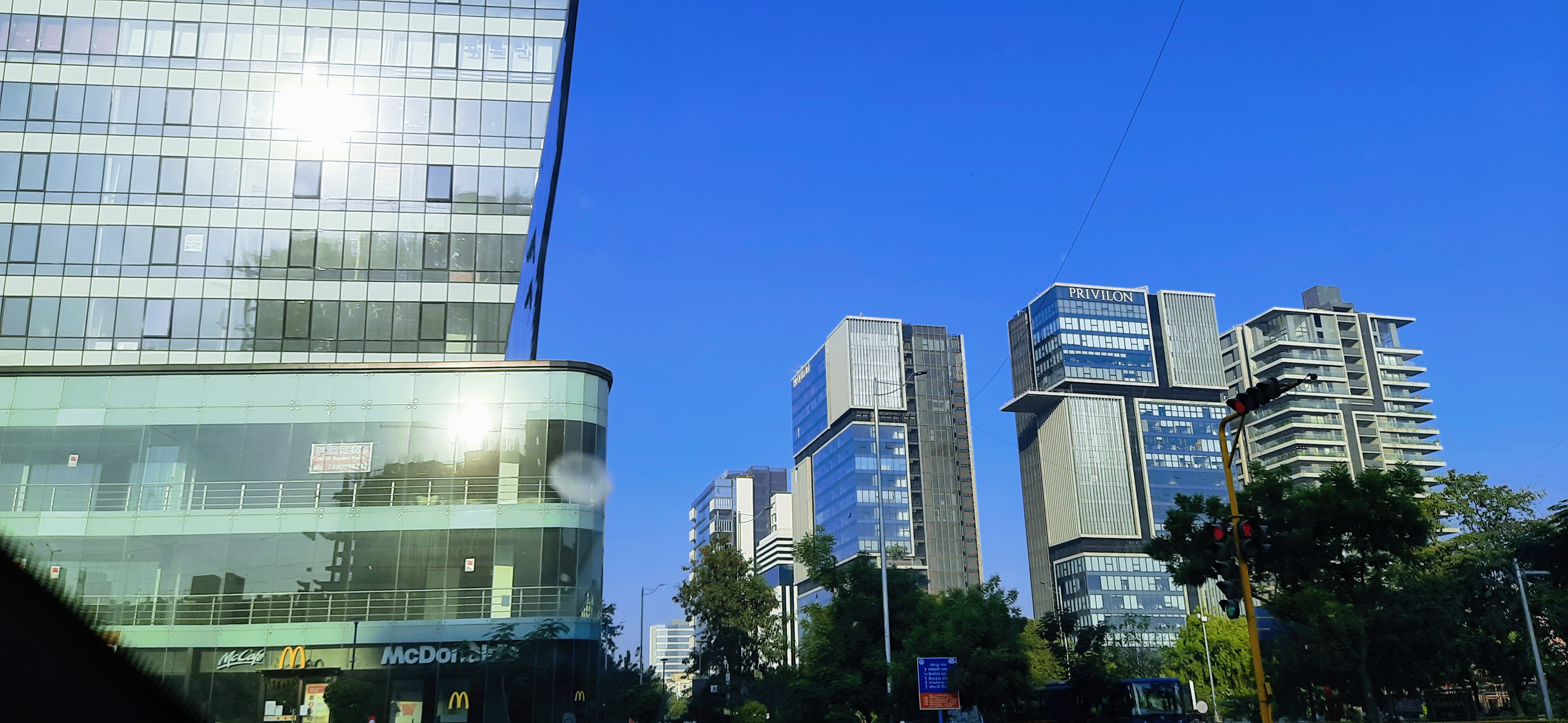
Ahmedabad, Gujarat

Potential host cities began exploring bids as early as 2021. A deadline of 31 March 2025 was set for potential host cities to express interest in hosting, and a deadline of 31 August 2025 was set for bid dossiers. India and Nigeria submitted formal proposals to host the 2030 Commonwealth Games by the 31 August deadline, Commonwealth Sport announced on 1 September. On 15 October 2025, Commonwealth Sport announced that the Indian bid had been recommended by its bid evaluation commission. The 2030 Commonwealth Games host city election was held during the Commonwealth Sport General Assembly in Glasgow on 26 November 2025. During the assembly, Commonwealth Sport officially declared Ahmedabad as the official host of the centennial edition of the Commonwealth Games.

2030 Commonwealth Games bidding results
City / region	Nation	Votes
Ahmedabad	India	Unanimous

=== Recommended bid ===
City	Country	Commonwealth Games Committee
Ahmedabad	India	Indian Olympic Association (IOA)
On 30 January 2025, Bhupendrabhai Patel, and members of the Athletics Federation of India, met with Commonwealth Games Federation vice-president Chris Jenkins in Gandhinagar to discuss a bid for the state of Gujarat to host a future Commonwealth Games. A venue plan was also outlined during the meeting, with two sport complexes being built with the city's bid for the 2036 Summer Olympics in mind are planned for use; Sardar Vallabhbhai Patel Sports Enclave would host aquatics, boxing, 3x3 basketball, cricket, gymnastics and kabaddi, and Naranpura Sports Complex for badminton, judo and table tennis. A new sporting complex for these Games would be built in the district of Karai, featuring a 50,000 capacity athletics stadium, a 5,000 capacity indoor arena, and a shooting range. The city will also host the 2029 World Police and Fire Games. On 16 February 2025, Commonwealth Games Federation chief executive officer Katie Sadleir announced her support for India's bid as a stepping stone for it hosting the 2036 Summer Olympics, saying "hosting the Olympics would be an incredible achievement, and having the 2030 Commonwealth Games in India would be the right step towards that goal. With the right leadership, infrastructure, and passion, it is on track to become one of the top 10 countries in the Olympics." An expression of interest was submitted on 21 March 2025. In June 2025, a delegation of Indian governmental and sports officials met with the Commonwealth Games Federation in the latter's headquarters in London, England. A government press release said, "We are designing a model for hosting the Games that focuses on long-term impact rather than short-term spectacle, using existing venues wherever possible and ensuring that the Games leave behind a meaningful legacy for local communities." On 13 August 2025, the Indian Olympic Association formally approved the bid during its Special General Meeting in New Delhi. Two weeks later, the Government of India approved the bid and agreed to all monetary guarantees required by the CGF, as the road to the 2036 Olympics. The deadline for submitting the final application is set for 31 August, with the IOA expected to complete all formalities imminently. Within the nation, at first, Ahmedabad and Bhubaneswar were reportedly the two main contenders; ultimately, victory was secured by the Western city on the strength of superior athletic venues and an established competency in hosting high-profile events. The bid evaluation commission of Commonwealth Sport nominated Ahmedabad as its preferred candidate on 15 October 2025, pending a final vote to be held at its general assembly in Glasgow on 26 November. The bid was unanimously approved on that date.

=== Eliminated bid ===
City	Country	Commonwealth Games Committee
Abuja	Nigeria	Nigeria Olympic Committee (NOC)
On 28 March 2025, the Nigeria Olympic Committee submitted an expression of interest to host the 2030 Games. In a statement, committee spokesperson, Tony Nezianya confirmed that a bid by the country's capital would "provide a compelling narrative for the nation’s progress and readiness." The bid requires approval from the country's federal government before the Nigeria Olympic Committee can make a formal proposal. Abuja previously bid for the 2014 Commonwealth Games, but lost to Glasgow, Scotland. The president of Nigeria, Bola Tinubu, announced his support for the bid in July 2025. In August 2025, a delegation of Nigerian governmental and sport officials met with the Commonwealth Games Federation in the latter's headquarters in London, England.

=== Proposed bids ===
- South Africa

A potential bid from South Africa was speculated ahead of the 2024 Commonwealth heads of government meeting in Samoa. Durban had previously been awarded hosting of the 2022 Commonwealth Games but was later stripped of hosting rights due to organizational and budget constraints, and Durban was replaced by Birmingham in 2017.

In June 2025, South Africa had been invited to bid for the 2030 edition, while awaiting cabinet approval by the government for its 2036 Olympic bid. The ambition is part of a long-term vision, which includes hosting smaller international events as preparation. SASCOC intends to first target the Commonwealth Games, including both youth and senior editions, in 2030, before mounting a serious campaign for the Olympics in 2040.

- Canada

United Canada
In March 2025, Commonwealth Sport Canada proposed a "United Canada" bid to host the Games, with venues spread across Canada's provinces. The president of the association, Rick Powers, states that there would be no new construction, but existing venues may need renovations. He went on to say that this plan would lower costs by 60% compared to a single city hosting, and that the budget would be shared across the host provinces. One of the directors, Claire Carver-Dias, had suggested the inclusion of lacrosse if the event was to be held in a First Nations territory.

On 31 March 2025, Commonwealth Sport Canada submitted an expression of interest, and would also reveal that the government, Indigenous peoples, and the provinces of Manitoba, Newfoundland and Labrador, Ontario, and Prince Edward Island had indicated their support. However, in June 2025, the government of Ontario withdrew the province from the bid.

Alberta
A potential bid from the province of Alberta, predominantly featuring Calgary, Edmonton and possibly other cities, was examined for the 2030 Commonwealth Games. The bid exploration received a potential for C$4 million in financial backing from the two cities and the province. On 3 August 2023, the Government of Alberta withdrew from Alberta's 2030 Commonwealth Games bid process thereby terminating the bid.

Hamilton, Ontario
A group of Hamilton businessmen planned a bid for the 2030 edition of the Commonwealth Games to mark 100 years since the city hosted the original Games, and briefly considered the 2026 edition when it became apparent there would be little other competition to host. But in April 2021, the spokesperson and chair for the Hamilton bid, Lou Frapporti, announced that Hamilton would scrap any bid for the 2026 edition and resume focusing on the 2030 edition instead. Frapporti stated that the reason for resuming focus on 2030 was that the province of Ontario was unlikely to support the 2026 bid due to the 2026 FIFA World Cup being scheduled to have games in Toronto and the unlikelihood of the CGF alternatively allowing for a move to 2027. In February 2023, it was announced that Hamilton was no longer Canada's preferred candidate for the 2030 Commonwealth Games, according to Commonwealth Sport Canada.

=== Declined bids ===
- Australia

Australian Commonwealth Games Association chief executive Craig Phillips stated his country's decision to decline to host the games due to close proximity to the 2032 Summer Olympics in Brisbane, and Victoria's decision to withdraw from hosting the 2026 Commonwealth Games.

Perth
On 17 April 2025, a newspaper in Western Australia reported that leader of the Western Australian Liberal Party, Basil Zempilas wanted Perth to bid, but missed the deadline to submit an expression of interest. Politician John Carey dismissed this proposal, calling it a "brain fart that would cost the state billions".

== Development and preparations ==
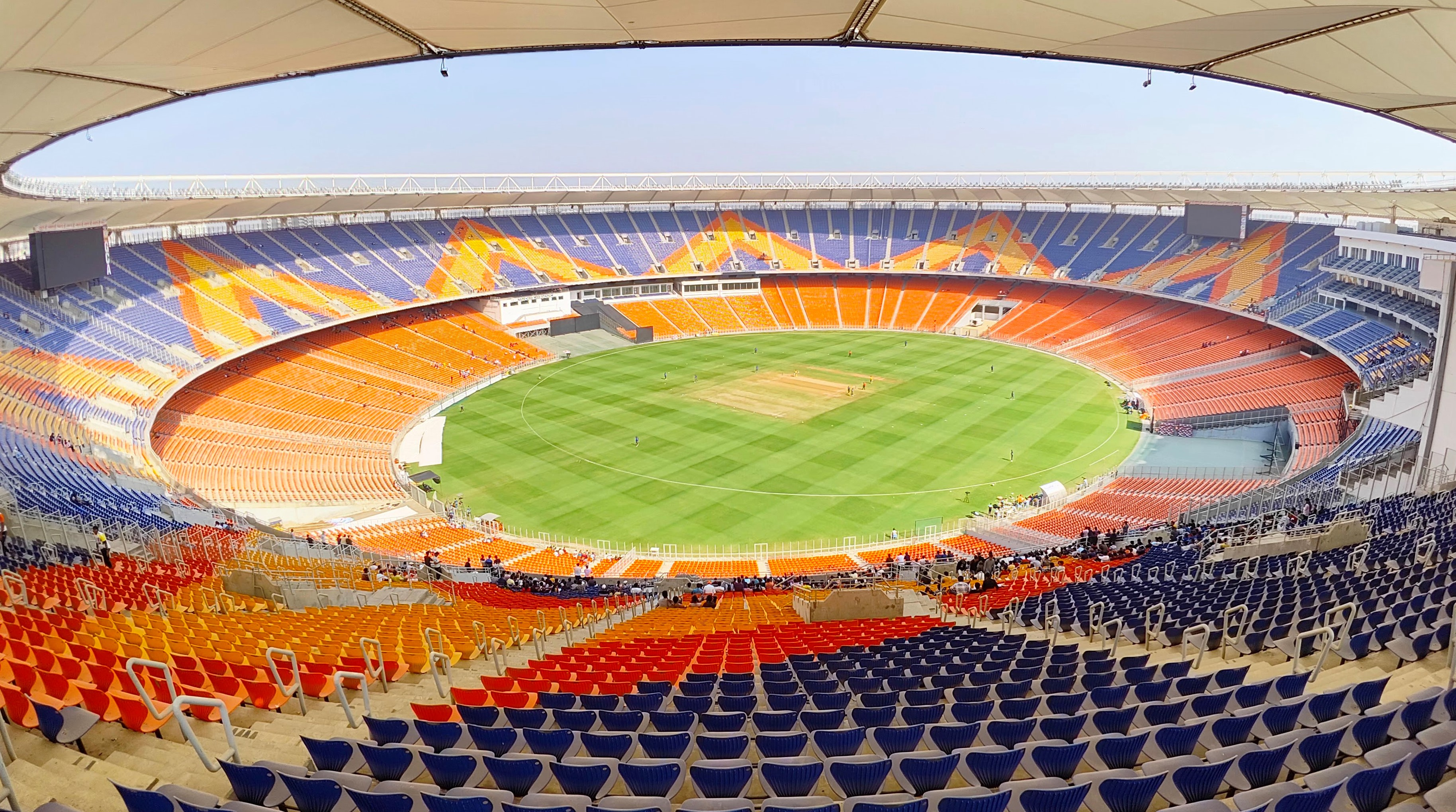
Narendra Modi Stadium

The organisers of the event have promised upgrades to roads, beautification, housing facilities, the Ahmedabad Metro system, and the construction or renovation of sports facilities. To allow for construction projects, some surrounding slums will be vacated prior to the event. The expansion of the Ahmedabad International Airport will also be completed before the Games. Almost all events are scheduled to be held in four cities in Gujarat: Ahmedabad, Gandhinagar, Vadodara, and Ekta Nagar. The 2026 Union budget of India and 2026 Amdavad Municipal Corporation budget saw large increases in sports-related funding, including for infrastructure and domestic programming. In September 2025, the Veer Savarkar Sports Complex was opened, at a cost of ₹825 crore. It is 21 acres in size and has six zones, including an aquatics centre and tennis courts. Venues are 85% complete as of May 2026, according to Indian officials.

=== Venues ===
The following venues are to be used for the 2030 Commonwealth Games:

==== Ahmedabad ====
Venue		Events	Capacity	Status
Sardar Vallabhbhai Patel Sports Enclave	Narendra Modi Stadium	Ceremonies	132,000	Existing
Sardar Vallabhbhai Patel Sports Enclave	Indoor Arena	TBA	18,000	New
Sardar Vallabhbhai Patel Sports Enclave	Aquatics Centre	TBA	12,000	New
Veer Savarkar Sports Complex		TBA	5,000	Existing

==== Gandhinagar ====
Venue		Events	Capacity	Status
Mahatma Mandir		TBA	TBA	Existing with temporary stands
IIT Gandhinagar		TBA	TBA	Existing
Karai Sports Academy	Stadium	Athletics	50,000	New
Karai Sports Academy	Shooting Center	Shooting	4,000	New
Karai Sports Academy	Indoor Arena	TBA	5,000	New

== Participating associations ==
All 74 Commonwealth Games Associations are expected to participate in the 2030 Commonwealth Games.

Participating Commonwealth Games Associations
- India (host)

== Sports ==
In October 2021, the CGF announced a new Games roadmap that will, starting with the 2030 Commonwealth Games, change the requirements for competed sports. The roadmap suggests that between 15 and 17 sports should be competed at each edition. There will be a new category of "Compulsory Sports", containing just athletics and swimming, as well as their para-sport counterparts. The category of "Core Sports" will cease to exist, and all other sports will have the same status; however, each host will have complete freedom to choose the programme for their edition from a previously assembled list, as long as the minimum number of 15 and the maximum number of 17 sports is not exceeded. If necessary, the hosts could suggest the addition of other sports that respect local demands.

Following the formal announcement of the host city on 26 November 2025, the first eight sports were announced. This is the second edition in which only 2 sports (athletics and swimming with their Paralympic counterparts) are on the list of compulsory sports. Five other sports that will be in the Glasgow 2026 programme will be retained; bowls and weightlifting — also with their Paralympic equivalents — along with artistic gymnastics, netball, and boxing. Furthermore, India included table tennis and its Paralympic equivalent, a sport that was absent from Glasgow 2026, bringing the total to eight sports on the programme. In April 2026, cricket and field hockey were confirmed, and there were proposals made to include up to two Indian traditional sports, with competitive yoga, kabaddi, kho kho and mallakhamba being discussed.

In June 2026, Commonwealth Sport chief executive Katie Sadleir said the Ahmedabad Games would feature a full programme of 17 sports, up from the reduced schedule used in Glasgow. She said organisers were aiming for a 60 percent reduction in hosting costs compared with earlier editions.

A further five to seven disciplines or sports from the following list of fifteen optional sports will also be chosen at a later date: archery, badminton, 3x3 basketball, beach volleyball, cycling, diving, judo, rhythmic gymnastics, rugby sevens, shooting, squash, tennis, triathlon and wrestling.

- Athletics
- Bowls
- Boxing
- Cricket
- Field hockey
- Gymnastics
  - Artistic
- Netball
- Swimming
- Table tennis
- Weightlifting
  - Para powerlifting

== Broadcasting ==
- Australia – Seven Network

== See also ==
- Other multi-sports events hosted in India:
  - 1951 and 1982 Asian Games in Delhi
  - 2010 Commonwealth Games in Delhi
  - 2003 Afro-Asian Games in Hyderabad
  - 2007 Military World Games in Hyderabad
  - 2008 Commonwealth Youth Games in Pune
  - 2014 Lusofonia Games in Goa

== Notes ==
Preceded by Glasgow	Commonwealth Games; Amdavad; XXIV Commonwealth Games	Succeeded by TBD
