= John Coates (sports administrator) =

Australian sports administrator (born 1950)

John Coates AC
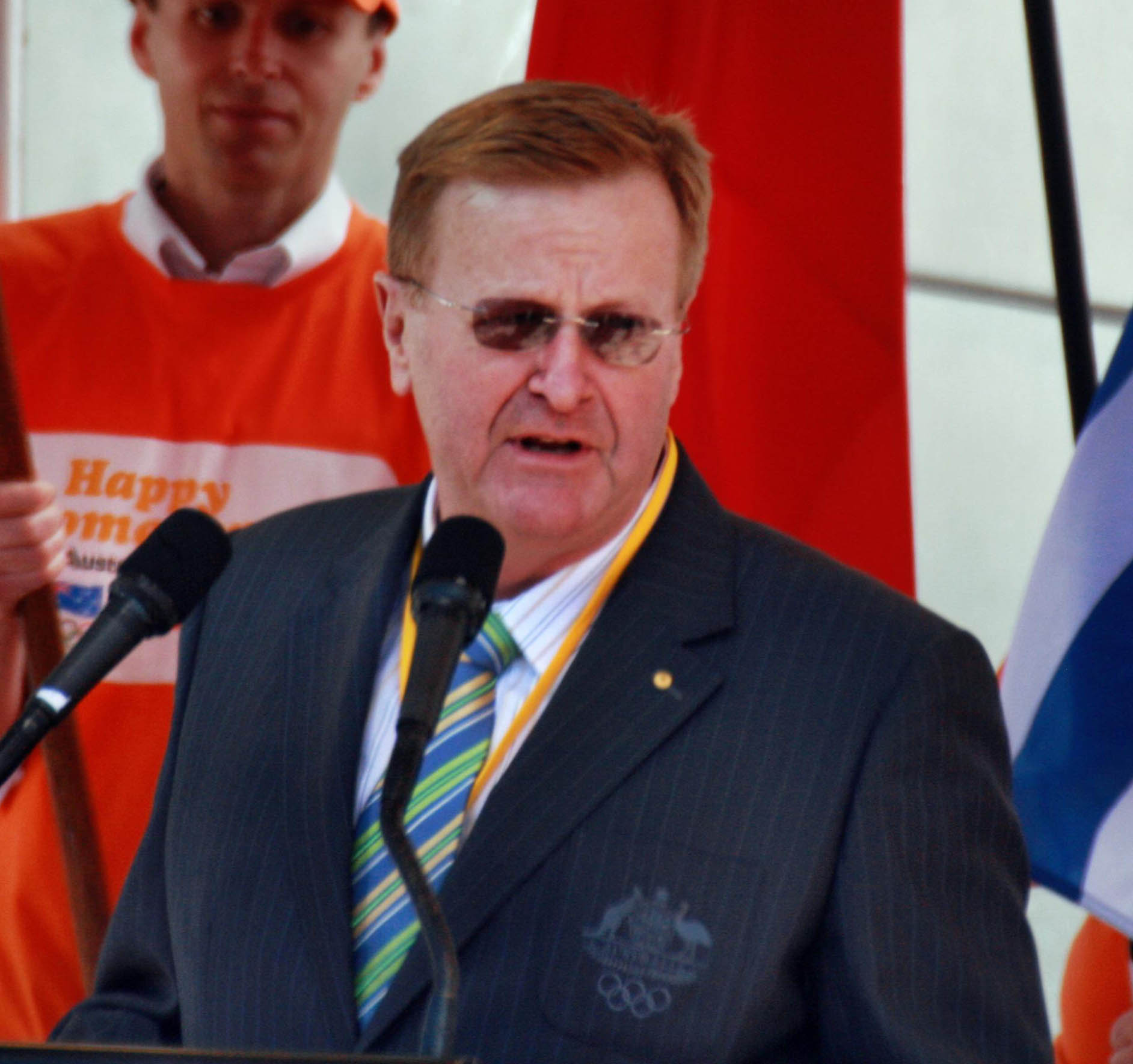
- Coates in 2008
- Born: John Dowling Coates; 7 May 1950 (age 76); Sydney, Australia
- Education: University of Sydney
- Occupation: Sports administrator
- Board member of: William Inglis & Son Ltd (Chair); Sydney Olympic Park Authority; Australian Olympic Foundation (Chair)
- Awards: Order of Australia: Companion (2006); Officer (1995); Member (1989); Australian Sports Medal (2001); Olympic Order (Gold) (2000)

John Dowling Coates AC (born 7 May 1950) is an Australian lawyer, sports administrator and businessman. He is a member of the International Olympic Committee (IOC) having been a vice president from 2013 to 2017 and again since 2020, and is the former president of the Australian Olympic Committee and chair of the Australian Olympic Foundation. Alongside these roles Coates is also the president of the Court of Arbitration for Sport and the International Council of Arbitration for Sport.

== Personal life ==
Born in Sydney, the son of a solicitor, Coates was brought up in the Sydney suburb of Strathfield. He attended Homebush Boys High School. He was keen on sports at school, being a member of the school's fifth Grade cricket XI in 1963 He took a day off school in early 1964 to watch Richie Benaud play his last test match, and a photograph appeared in The Sydney Morning Herald the next day of a beaming young Coates alongside Benaud as he left the field of play. Failing to make the school's senior cricket sides, he took up rowing in 1967, some three years after the school had introduced the sport in 1964, coxing one of the school's boats to victories over more experienced crews from established rowing schools at several regattas. In 1968 he was captain of the school's rowing squad.

Failing to matriculate at his first attempt at the Higher School Certificate in 1967, Coates repeated Year 12 in 1968 with better results.

After leaving school he studied at the University of Sydney, and qualified as a solicitor.

Coates has been married twice. His first marriage was to the former representative rower, Pauline Kahl with whom he had six children. They are now divorced. In October 2017, after a three-year engagement, Coates married the Timor-Leste-born Orieta Pires, a hair and make-up artist. The wedding occurred in a suburban Sydney park.

== Career as a sports administrator ==
After having remained involved with the sport of rowing through Sydney Rowing Club, Coates was in 1978 elected to the (now defunct) position of Honorary Secretary of the Australian Amateur Rowing Council (now Rowing Australia) and in 1983 became President (and from 1984 chairman). He continued in this role until 1988.

Coates has been a fixture at the Summer Olympics for more than 30 years, having been Australian Olympic Team Rowing Section Manager at the Montreal Games (1976), Administration Director at the Moscow Games (1980), Deputy Chef de Mission at the Los Angeles Games (1984), and Chef de mission at the Seoul (1988), Barcelona (1992), Atlanta (1996), Sydney (2000), Athens (2004) and Beijing (2008) Games.

Past or current positions include:

- Member of the Australian Olympic Committee (AOC) since 1981, having been Vice-President (1985–1990) then President (1990–2022)
- Member International Olympic Committee (IOC) since 2001 and an elected member of the Executive Board from 2009 to 2013, Vice-President from 2013 to 2017
- Member, IOC Rio Coordination Commission and chairman, IOC Tokyo 2020 Coordination and Legal Affairs Commissions
- IOC Delegate for Broadcast Rights negotiations in Oceania
- Chairman of the Australian Olympic Foundation from 1996
- Member (1994) and then Vice-President from 1995 and then President from 2010 of the Council of the Court of Arbitration for Sport (CAS)
- Member of Sydney Olympic Park Authority since 2005 include:
- a Director (1985) and then Deputy chairman (1986–1989) of the Australian Institute of Sport and as member (1987–1989) and then Deputy chairman (1989–1998) of the Australian Sports Commission
- Senior Vice-President of the Organising Committee of the Sydney Olympic Games (SOCOG) from 1993 to 2000 and Chairman of SOCOG Sports Commission (1996–2000)
- Council Member of the International Rowing Federation (FISA) from 1992 to 2014

In 2016 it was reported that Coates was paid a salary of A$689,634 in 2015 as Executive Chairman of the Australian Olympic Committee and that he had collected A$7.05 million in consulting fees and allowances between 2000 and 2016.

== Olympic bids ==
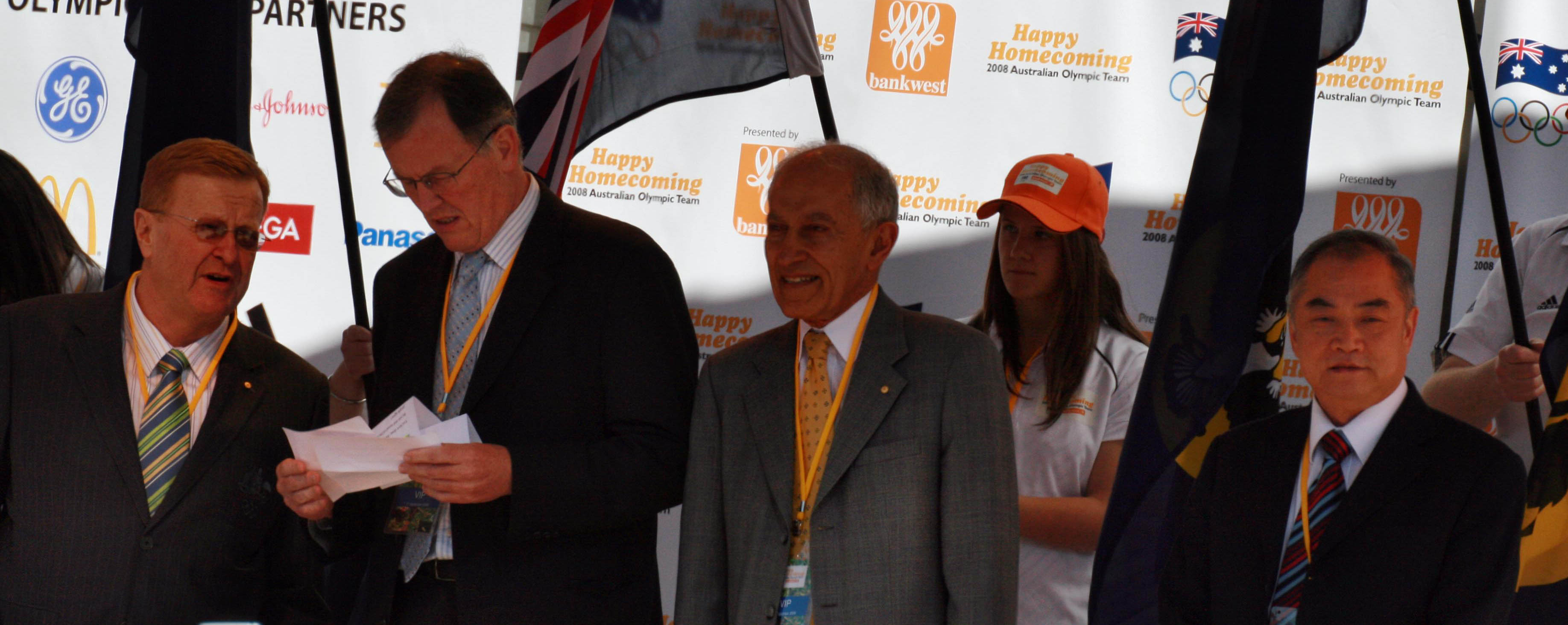
John Coates, Rob Hulls, David de Kretser, and John So at the 2008 Australian Olympic team parade in Melbourne.

He has been a part of a number of Olympic bids including the Brisbane 1992 Olympic Games Bid, Melbourne Olympic Games Bid Strategy Committee, and the 1991–1993 Sydney Olympics 2000 Bid Limited.

Coates was Vice President of the Sydney Olympic Bid Committee. He played a key role in bringing the 2000 Olympics to Australia and in its delivery.

Before the Sydney 2000 Olympics Coates offered African countries scholarships, allowing their athletes to train in Adelaide in the lead up to the Sydney Games. 400 athletes from 11 African nations took part in the Special Olympics Training Camp. Under the program the visiting teams received all meals, accommodation, training facilities, local transport, and access to sports medicine experts. In total, the Program provided $2 million to support the development of African athletes and coaches who participated in the Sydney 2000 Olympic Games. The bulk of that amount was spent in Australia. The controversy caused by this was fully investigated by the IOC, and Coates was cleared of any wrongdoing.

Coates was quoted as saying, "I wasn't going to die wondering why we didn't win, like we didn't win (when competing with) Brisbane or Melbourne. We needed to get our fair share of votes out of Africa."

In an article published in Sydney's The Daily Telegraph on 27 January 1999, Coates said Australian officials had at first been "terribly naive" about the bidding process but soon "refined" their efforts. Based on the lessons of two failed Games bids (Brisbane and Melbourne), Coates produced a 16-page strategy document. With government support, the budget for securing IOC delegates' support was increased from A$6 million for the Brisbane bid to A$28 million for Sydney.

As he explained, "Over the course of my involvement with three Australian Olympic bids, I watched this bidding process get out of hand. After a relatively benign process delivered the 1988 Games to Seoul, the 1992 bid took the process to a new level of professionalism and competition. That escalation continued for the 1996 and 2000 bids, with each successive bidder seeking an edge."

In July 2021 the International Olympic Committee (IOC) awarded the hosting rights of the 2032 Summer Olympics to Brisbane, stating that John Coates played no role in the bidding decisions. However, it was believed that Australia's win in the one-city race wouldn't have been possible "if we didn't have John Coates". Coates, who maintains close ties with the IOC President Thomas Bach, was able to secure the hosting rights for Australia for the third time, after the 1956 Summer Olympics held majorly in Melbourne and the 2000 Summer Olympics that took place in Sydney. However, some critics believe that he made a terrible mistake because some sectors of Australian society believe that holding these games could cause an economic recession in the country and there's a real possibility to exceed the planned budget. Prior to the Sydney Olympics, Coates had allegedly paid $35,000 inducements to both of the two African members of the IOC, Major-General Francis Nyangweso of Uganda and Charles Mukora of Kenya in 1993. "My view was it might encourage them to consider their votes for Sydney," Coates said at the time.

== Controversies ==
In 1980 Coates was at the heart of the controversy as to whether Australia should boycott the Summer Games in Moscow. He was adamant that, as one of the five countries that had participated at every games, Australia's sporting bodies should not bow to political pressure to boycott, but rather should indeed send a team to Moscow.

In the mid-1990s Coates together with Leo Wallner, then Austrian Olympic Committee president and head of Casinos Austria, joined with the Australian Olympic Committee's investment arm, under Coates' leadership, to invest in the establishment of a casino in Cairns in north-east Australia. In 2007, Coates said, "We held onto our shares and sold them only last year. Our original investment was AU$7 million and we ended up losing AU$3.5 million."

In 1997 Coates and then-NSW State Treasurer Michael Egan engaged in a dispute over an alleged conflict of interest arising from criticisms Coates had made in regard to accommodation taxes imposed by the government.

Coates and Sydney talkback radio host Alan Jones have had a long-standing feud that has occasionally ended in litigation. In April 2007, this litigation was concluded when Coates was awarded $360,000 damages when a jury found a broadcast made by Jones in December 2004 conveyed defamatory meanings.

In August 2007 during a broadcast made during an International Olympic Committee inspection in Beijing, Jones made comments, based on wire service reports, about an interview that Coates had given in which it was alleged that Coates had made disparaging remarks about the 2008 Summer Olympics. Subsequently, in October 2007, Jones apologised to Coates on air for his comments.

In July 2021 Coates was criticised for a rude action with Queensland premier Annastacia Palaszczuk at a Brisbane 2032 press conference held during the 2020 Summer Olympics in Tokyo. After Brisbane was announced as the winning host city of the 2032 Summer Olympics, Coates told the premier to be present at the opening ceremony of the 2020 Summer Olympics when she had previously declined the invitation to attend. Australian media personalities such as Julia Zemiro, Magda Szubanski, Ellen Fanning and Natalie Forrest all condemned the way he spoke to the Queensland premier with Szubanksi describing it as "thuggish" while Zemiro accused him of humiliating and pestering Palaszczuk. Former Swimming Australia CEO Leigh Russell said it was "disgusting" and another example of how women in sport are treated. Palaszczuk said she hadn't wanted to offend anyone. Coates later defended the exchange with Palaszczuk in a statement. He said his comments had been "completely misinterpreted". Although he believed all three levels of government should go to the opening ceremony, Coates said it had always been Palaszczuk's choice whether she attended. He also said that he and the premier had "a long standing and very successful relationship" and that they both knew in what spirit the remarks had been made. He added that he had no indication that the premier had been offended.

== Business career ==
Coates is chair of William Inglis & Son, a bloodstock auction and financial services company; a member of the Grant Samuel Advisory Board; a member of the European Australian Business Council and member of the Sydney Olympic Park Authority board.

He is a former deputy chairman and non-executive director of David Jones; and former partner in the Sydney law firm of Kemp Strang. He is a former director of the Australian subsidiaries of Grosvenor Group, a property development company privately owned by the Duke of Westminster.

He was previously on the boards of several state and federal statutory bodies, charities, and companies, including, from just after the 2000 Olympic Games, the Australian subsidiary of the public relations company Burson-Marsteller.

== Honours and awards ==
Coates was appointed a Companion of the Order of Australia in 2006. He had previously been appointed as a Member of the Order of Australia in 1989 and an Officer of the Order of Australia in 1995. In 2001 he was awarded an Australian Sports Medal.

In 1993, Coates was made a life member of Rowing Australia, an honour bestowed only on five others. He is an honorary life member of Sydney Rowing Club.

In December 1993, he was inducted into the Sport Australia Hall of Fame.

In 2003, Coates became the fourth Australian to present the prizes at the conclusion of the annual Henley Regatta. Usually this honour is reserved for royalty, diplomats or leading politicians. He was the first person to present the Princess Grace Challenge Cup.

In 2000, he was awarded the Olympic Order in Gold and the FISA Medal of Honour.
