= Sam Coffa =

Australian weightlifter and sports administrator

Salvatore "Sam" Coffa, AM, JP (born 15 January 1936) is an Australian former weightlifter and long-time sporting administrator. He was also actively involved in community affairs, and was a councillor and mayor of the former City of Hawthorn, Melbourne.

== Weightlifting ==
Sam Coffa's first weightlifting competition was at the Hawthorn Boys' Club Annual Display at the Hawthorn Town Hall, in 1954.

He then represented Australia at the 1954 World Championships in Perth; then at the 1962 British Empire and Commonwealth Games; and the 1964 Summer Olympics.

He was Victorian Champion 11 times consecutively between 1959 and 1969, and is six times Australian Champion.

== Sports administration ==
Coffa has served Australia for more than 40 years as an athlete and sports administrator, particularly as an Executive Board Member, Commonwealth Games Federation. He was President of Commonwealth Games Australia from 1999 to 2018. He was Deputy Chairman of the 2006 Melbourne Commonwealth Games Bid Committee and 2006 Melbourne Commonwealth Games Organising Committee. He is also vice president of the International Weightlifting Federation, and Chairman of the IWF's Technical Committee.

== Councillor and mayor ==
Sam was first elected onto the Hawthorn City Council in 1972.

In 1979, The Age newspaper reported the following: "Sam Coffa, was widely known and liked within the Hawthorn area through his interactions with the business community, his youth work, the Hawthorn City Band, Rotary and the Community Chest and in particular the sport of weightlifting. It was these connections which encouraged him to stand for election as a city councillor. He was elected unopposed to represent Auburn ward upon the retirement of Max Yunghams in 1972.

He was elected first European-born mayor of Hawthorn in 1979-1980 at the age of 43 yrs".

He remained a Hawthorn councillor for 14 years serving a second term as mayor in 1986-87, after which he did not seek re-election. (In 1994, the Hawthorn City Council was incorporated into the then-newly established City of Boroondara.)

== Community affairs ==
Shortly after arriving in Australia, Sam had joined the Hawthorn City Band, which was his entrée into a life of serving the community.

He soon became a member of the Hawthorn Boys' Club, (later known as Hawthorn Citizens' Youth Club) and was a driving force for the inclusion of young women into the club. The Coffa family have made a huge contribution to the Hawthorn Citizens Youth Club. Sam was elected president in 1964 and secretary in 1967, the latter a position he held for many years. Sam was also the driving force behind the establishment of the new million dollar Hawthorn Community Recreation Centre situated beside the Glenferrie Oval and as Mayor of the City of Hawthorn, and club secretary, he presided over the official opening ceremony by the Governor of Victoria, Sir Henry Winneke in November, 1979. Mrs Marjorie Coffa held the position of president in 1979/80, 1998/99, as did his brother Paul Coffa in 1987, and son Daniel in 1989/90. Sam Coffa's daughter, Iolanda Marinov is currently [2018] the club secretary. Sam still retains the position of honorary manager and treasurer. Both Marjorie (deceased) and Sam Coffa are Honorary Life members of the Hawthorn Citizens Youth Club.

Over the years Sam has been associated with many other community organisations, particularly those based in Hawthorn. He is a long time member of the Hawthorn Historical Society.

== Personal life ==
He was born on 15 January 1936 in Ferla, Italy. Sponsored by his uncle, Sam migrated to Australia in 1952 at the age of 16 years. Initially, he boarded with a family in Liddiard Street, Hawthorn. Other members of the Coffa family soon followed Sam from Sicily to Melbourne. The long-term family home was located Hawthorn. He lived there with his 2 sisters Michela/Lina and Salvina and his brother Paul.

Coffa and his family, opened a boot repairing business in 1954. They specialised in surgical boot making. The shop was in Glenferrie Road, Hawthorn, next to the Maternal Health Centre and close to Hawthorn Library. It closed in 1993.

Coffa became an Australian citizen in 1959, and his naturalisation (now citizenship) certificate is dated 12 October 1959.

Marjorie Edith Lamb had known Sam for some years prior to their marriage in 1959, at the Immaculate Conception Church, Hawthorn. Marjorie Lamb was the daughter of Mrs M G Mueller and step-daughter of Mr M G Mueller of Oxley Road Hawthorn. Mrs Coffa died on 30 June 2017.

== Recognition ==
- 1988 - Member in the General Division of the Order of Australia for his service to sport, in particular weightlifting, youth and the community.
- 2000 - Australian Sports Medal
- 2018 - General Member of the Sport Australia Hall of Fame for outstanding service to the Commonwealth Games and Weightlifting Australia.
- Life Member Commonwealth Games Australia
