= Perry Crosswhite =

Australian basketball player and sport administrator

Perry Rothrock Crosswhite AM (born 22 September 1947) is a former Australian Olympic basketballer and leading sport administrator.

== Personal ==
He was born on 22 September 1947 in Washington, D.C. He moved to Australia in 1969 to play basketball. He married Janice Steel in 1970. He was naturalised in 1971. His wife Janice Crosswhite plays a major role in the promotion of women's sport in Australia and overseas. They have three daughters and a son. Two of his children, Ian and Anna, have played high level basketball in Australia.

== Basketball career ==
Crosswhite played collegiate basketball (1966–1969) at Davidson College for coach Lefty Driesell. After Davidson, he moved to Australia in 1969 to play for Melbourne Tigers that were coached by Lindsay Gaze. He represented Australia at three Olympics – 1972 Munich, 1976 Montreal and 1980 Moscow. He captained the team at the 1976 and 1980 Games. He was captain of the Australian team at the 1974 FIBA World Championship. He played over 300 games for Australia. He was a member of the Victorian teams that won four national championship tournaments in 1971, 1973, 1975 and, 1979.

== Sport Administration career ==
=== Early career ===
He was a secondary teacher with the Victorian Education Department from 1969 to 1973. Between 1973 and 1979, he was a Recreation/Sport Officer with the Victorian Department of Youth, Sport and Recreation. He was the first professional Recreation/Sport Officer employed by the Department. He held senior management positions with Department of Youth, Sport and Recreation between 1979 and 1983. In 1983, he moved to Canberra to take up a senior management position with the Department of Tourism and Recreation. He joined the Department when the Australian Government started its serious involvement in the development of sport, which included the establishment of the Australian Institute of Sport (AIS) in 1981.

=== Australian Sports Commission ===
He moved to the newly established Australian Sports Commission (ASC) in 1984 and remained with that organisation until 1990. He held senior management positions including Assistant general manager from 1984 to 1987. He acted as general manager and Executive Director between 1987 and 1990 while the AIS was being merged with the ASC. While at the ASC, he played a major role in the development of sports participation programs including the Aussie Sport program for children.

=== Australian Olympic Committee ===
In 1991, he became first Executive Director of the Australian Olympic Committee (AOC). During his time at the AOC, he was responsible for organising three Australian Olympic Teams – 1992 Barcelona Summer Games, 1992 Albertville Winter Games and 1994 Lillehammer Winter Games. He was also heavily involved in Australia's successful bid in 1993 to host the 2000 Sydney Olympics. Between 1993 and 1995, he was a member of the Sydney Organising Committee for the Olympic Games (SOCOG). During his time at the AOC, the organisation and elite sport became more professional and organised.

=== Australian Commonwealth Games Federation ===
In 1995, he became the Australian Commonwealth Games Association's first general manager. In this role, he was responsible for the organisation of Australian Teams at the 1998 Kuala Lumpur Games, 2002 Manchester Games, 2006 Melbourne Games and 2010 Delhi Games. He played a pivotal role in Australia's successful bid for the 2006 Melbourne Games and the 2018 Gold Coast Games. He is currently a board member of the Gold Coast 2018 Commonwealth Games Corporation. He was also a member of the Organising Committee of II Commonwealth Youth Games in Bendigo 2004. He has been a member of several Commonwealth Games Federation Committees. He retired from the Association in July 2015 and his replacement was Craig Phillips.

== Recognition ==
- 1998 – Australian Sports Administrator of the Year
- 2000 – Australian Sports Medal
- 2003 – Inducted into the Sport Australia Hall of Fame as an administrator.
- 2007 – Member of the Order of Australia (AM) – for service to sport, particularly through executive roles with the Commonwealth and Olympic Games organisations, and to basketball as a competitor at national and international levels.
- 2016 - Basketball Australia Hall of Fame.
- Life Member Commonwealth Games Australia
