= Hugh Weir =

Australian sports administrator

Hugh Richard Weir OBE CBE (21 July 1894 – 5 March 1975) was an Australian sports administrator and International Olympic Committee member.

== Personal ==
Weir was born in Melbourne, Victoria on 21 July 1894. He died of a heart attack on 5 March 1975 in Sydney, New South Wales. During his working career, he was a Manager with shipping company McIllwraith McEacharn.

== Career as a sports administrator ==
Weir joined the Essendon Amateur Athletic Club in 1913 and was a highly regarded hurdler, sprinter and long jumper until 1926. In 1920, he was the Club's delegate to the Victorian Amateur Athletic Association and was appointed Association treasurer in 1923 and then Secretary from 1924 until 1935. In 1927, he was appointed Secretary General of the Victorian Olympic Council. He was Manager of the Australian team at the 1930 British Empire Games.

In 1936, Weir became a board member of the Amateur Athletic Union of Australia. Weir was its President from 1944 to 1957. Between 1956 and 1958, he was Vice President of the International Amateur Athletic Federation.

He was involved in organizing the 1935 Centenary Games in Melbourne, the 1938 British Empire Games in Sydney and the 1956 Olympic Games in Melbourne.

Weir was an International Olympic Committee member from 1946 until his death in 1975. He was a chairman of the IOC's Eligibility Commission which examined the issue of amateurism.

== Honours ==
- 1935 - Victorian Amateur Athletic Association (now Athletics Victoria) Life Member
- 1953 - Order of the British Empire - Officer (Civil)
- 1956 - IAAF Veterans Pin
- 1956 - The Medal of Merit of the Equestrian Olympic Games
- 1957 - Athletics Australia Honorary Life Governor
- 1958 - Order of the British Empire - Commander (Civil)
- Australian Olympic Committee Life Member
