= Commonwealth Games Australia =

Sports association in Australia

- Abbreviation: CGA
- Predecessor: Australian Commonwealth Games Association
- Headquarters: Melbourne, Victoria, Australia
- Patron in Chief: Sam Mostyn (Governor General of the Commonwealth of Australia)
- Patron: Anthony Albanese (Prime Minister of Australia)
- President: Ben Houston
- Chief Executive Officer: Craig Phillips
- Website: commonwealthgames.com.au

Commonwealth Games Australia (CGA) is the Commonwealth Games Association for Australia, and is responsible for representing and promoting the Commonwealth Sport movement in the country, and organises the participation of athletes at the Commonwealth Games and Commonwealth Youth Games. It changed it name from the Australian Commonwealth Games Association to Commonwealth Games Australia in 2015. The Commonwealth Games have been held in Australia five times, most recently the 2018 Commonwealth Games were held on the Gold Coast, Queensland.

== Role ==
The CGA is one of 72 Commonwealth Games Associations currently recognised by the Commonwealth Games Federation (CGF).

Working with the national governing bodies of each sport, Commonwealth Games Australia selects Team Australia's members to compete in all sports at the Commonwealth Games and Commonwealth Youth Games. The CGA is independent and receives no funding from the government. The non-profit organisation's income comes from fundraising and events.

== Administration ==
It was established in October 1929 as the Australian British Empire Games Committee with E.S. Marks as chairman and James. S.W. Eve as honorary secretary. It has also known as Australian British Empire Games Association, Australian British Empire & Commonwealth Association, Australian British Commonwealth Games Association and Australian Commonwealth Games Association.

=== Australian British Empire Games Committee (1929–1932) ===
Dates	Chairman	Honorary Secretary-Treasurer
October 1929	E.S.Marks	James Eve

=== Australian British Empire Games Association (1932–1953) ===
Dates	Chairman	Honorary Secretary-Treasurer
October 1932	E.S.Marks	James Eve
June 1938-1949	E.S.Marks*	James Eve
February 1949	Harold Alderson	James Eve
January 1951	Harold Alderson	James Eve

(*) died in 1947

=== Australian British Empire & Commonwealth Association (1953–1966) ===
Dates	Chairman	Honorary Secretary-Treasurer
June 1953-1965	Harold Alderson	James Eve
June 1965-1968	Harold Alderson	James Eve

=== Australian British Commonwealth Games Association (1966–1974) ===
Dates	Chairman	Honorary Secretary-Treasurer
November 1968	Harold Alderson	James Eve
November 1969-1973	Harold Alderson	Arthur Tunstall

=== Australian Commonwealth Games Association (1974–2015) ===
Dates	Chairman	Honorary Secretary-Treasurer
June 1974-1977	Edgar Tanner	Arthur Tunstall
1977-1979	William Young	Arthur Tunstall
1979-1987	Les Martyn	Arthur Tunstall
1987-1998	Ray Godkin	Arthur Tunstall

Dates	President	General Manager
1998-November 1999	Sam Coffa	Perry Crosswhite

Dates	President	Chief Executive Officer
1999-2015	Sam Coffa	Perry Crosswhite

=== Commonwealth Games Australia (2015–) ===
Dates	President	Chief Executive Officer
2015-2018	Sam Coffa	Craig Phillips
2018-	Ben Houston	Craig Phillips

== Aims ==
The main functions of the CGA are to:

- Promote the ideals of the Commonwealth Games throughout Australia;
- Prepare athletes for the Games by providing support such as funding for international competition;
- Select athletes, coaches, managers, medical personnel and officials to be included in the Australian Team at the Games;
- Coordinate and manage the participation of Program Sports and their respective athletes and officials at the Commonwealth Games;
- Contribute to the development of Australia's high performance junior athletes through the Australian Junior Commonwealth Games Squad Program (AJCGS), and through participation in the Commonwealth Youth Games.

== History ==
From the concept of "a British Empire Sports Festival" by the Englishman, J Astley Cooper, the idea was promoted in Australia by B J Parkinson in Victoria and Richard Coombes in New South Wales who was President of the Amateur Athletic Union of Australia. Australia has won the medal tally at 13 Commonwealth games.

Australia first competed at the Games, then titled the British Empire Games, in 1930; and is one of only six countries to have sent athletes to every Commonwealth Games. The others are Canada, England, New Zealand, Scotland, and Wales.

Six of the 21 games have been hosted by Australia, with the city of Gold Coast hosting the 2018 Commonwealth Games.

Australia has placed first at 13 out of the 21 games (compared with England 7 and Canada 1) and has been in the top three for all meets except the first games in 1930.

In all but one of the 18 Commonwealth Games held so far (excluding the 1978 Games), the Australian flag bearer has gone on to win a gold medal.

=== Games Staged ===
Australia has hosted the Commonwealth Games on four occasions but have only won once via an international vote. That vote was for the host of the 2018 games, won by the Gold Coast.

Sydney 1938 was simply awarded.

Perth 1962 was a contest between Adelaide and Perth which Adelaide originally won at the 1956 Summer Olympics in Melbourne, Australia. Adelaide first won 13 votes to Perth's 3. Two years later that was overturned by the Australian Commonwealth Games Association prior to the 1958 British Empire Games in Cardiff, Wales. A New Vote awarded Perth with a 9 to 7 vote.

Brisbane 1982 was awarded after Lagos, Nigeria; Kuala Lumpur, Malaysia and Birmingham, England all withdrew prior to the Bid vote that took place in Montreal, Quebec, Canada during the 1976 Summer Olympics.

Melbourne 2006 was awarded to the city after Wellington, New Zealand withdrew their bid prior to the Bid Lodgement Deadline.

Year	Host city, State	Years Between
2018 Commonwealth Games	Gold Coast, Queensland	12
2006 Commonwealth Games	Melbourne, Victoria	24
1982 Commonwealth Games	Brisbane, Queensland	20
1962 British Empire and Commonwealth Games	Perth, Western Australia	24
1938 British Empire Games	Sydney, New South Wales	-

=== Failed bid Results ===
Year	Australian Candidate City	Winning City	Vote Tally
1974 Commonwealth Games	Melbourne	Christchurch	2-36
1998 Commonwealth Games	Adelaide	Kuala Lumpur	25-40
2026 Commonwealth Games	Hobart	Regional Victoria	Unanimous
2030 Commonwealth Games	Perth	Ahmedabad	Withdrew

== See also ==
- Australia at the Commonwealth Games
- Australian Olympic Committee
- Australian Paralympic Committee
