= Australian Weightlifting Federation =

Sports governing body in Australia

- Sport: Weightlifting
- Jurisdiction: National
- Abbreviation: (AWF)
- Founded: 1947
- Affiliation: International Weightlifting Federation (IWF)
- Regional affiliation: Oceania Weightlifting Federation (OWF)
- Headquarters: Australia

Official website
- www.awf.com.au
- (Australia)

The Australian Weightlifting Federation is the governing body for the sport of Weightlifting in Australia. The current president of the AWF is Sam Coffa. He has previously served this office from 1983-2007, and began his second term in 2018, which is ongoing.

== Structure ==
The national body has eight state member associations:

- Weightlifting ACT
- Northern Territory Weightlifting Assoc Inc
- NSW Weightlifting Assoc Limited
- Queensland Weightlifting Assoc Inc
- South Australian Weightlifting Assoc Inc
- Victorian Weightlifting Assoc Inc
- Weightlifting Tasmania Inc
- Weightlifting Western Australia Inc
