= Julius Patching =

Australian sports administrator

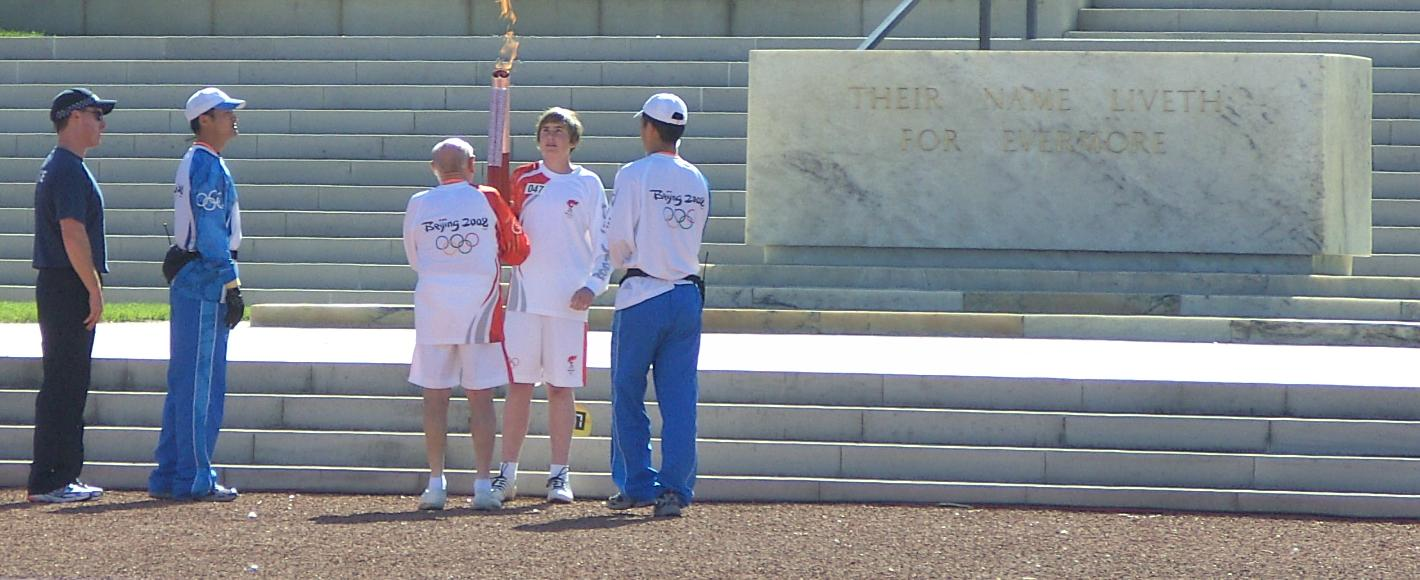
Patching hands over the Olympic flame to Jake Warcaba at the Australian War Memorial.

Julius Lockington "Judy" Patching, AO, OBE (4 January 1917 – 13 February 2009) was an Australian Olympic sports administrator, and businessman.

== Early years ==
Patching started his involvement in sport as a track and field athlete in 1932 with the Geelong Guild Athletic Club and Athletics Victoria (formerly the Victorian Amateur Athletic Association). In 1933, he played a year of Australian Rules Football for Rosebud in the Mornington Peninsula Nepean Football League. He was a keen hurdler and pentathlete, making the finals in both 110 and 440 yards hurdles in the 1946 Victorian championships.

Patching joined the Royal Australian Navy in 1934 and served for 13 years, including World War II. He knew some of the sailors killed in the loss of HMAS Sydney.

== Sport ==
Patching's Australian Olympic achievements include:

- Chief starter and member of the Technical Committee at both the 1956 Summer Olympics in Melbourne, and the 1962 Commonwealth Games in Perth
- Athletics Section Manager at the 1960 Summer Olympics in Rome
- Assistant General Manager at the 1964 Summer Olympics in Tokyo
- Chef de Mission at both the 1968 Summer Olympics in Mexico City and 1972 Summer Olympics in Munich
- Deputy Mayor of the Olympic village at the 2000 Summer Olympics in Sydney, and
- 'runner' (at age 91, the oldest) in the 2008 Summer Olympics torch relay, in Canberra, 24 April 2008

Patching was also:

- Delegate to the International Amateur Athletic Federation from 1960 to 1970
- Secretary General of the Australian Olympic Committee from 1973 to 1985
- Superintendent of recreation for the City of Melbourne from 1966 to 1983
- Past President and Secretary General of the Victorian Olympic Council, and
- Founding Secretary General of the Association of Oceania National Olympic Committees (ONOC).

Patching contributed to the Victorian Olympic Council as:

- 1971–1973 Honorary Secretary
- 1974 Executive Member
- 1975–1985 Chairman
- 1986–1993 President

The VOC's "Julius Lockington Patching Sports Official of the Year Award" was inaugurated in 2008.

== Honours and awards ==
Patching was honoured with Life Membership of:

- the Geelong Guild Athletic Club
- the Victorian Amateur Athletic Association, now Athletics Victoria
- the Victorian Olympic Council
- the Australian Olympic Committee
- the Archery Society of Victoria, and
- Fencing Australia.

Patching was awarded:

- the Award of Merit from the Australian Athletic Union, now Athletics Australia
- the Award of Merit from the Association of National Olympic Committees
- the International Olympic Committee's Olympic Order (Silver)
- the Australian Sports Medal
- the first Oceania National Olympic committees (ONOC) Merit Award
- Australia's recipient of the International Olympic Committee's Centenary of Olympic Games Award, and
- Honorary Life Patron of the Olympians Club of Victoria, in 2003.

Patching's outstanding contribution to sport was also honoured with appointment as an Officer of the Order of the British Empire in 1970 and as an Officer of the Order of Australia in 1985.

== Peter Norman ==
Patching was Chef de Mission for Australia during the famous 1968 Olympics Black Power salute. He resisted calls by conservatives in the media to punish Peter Norman, who wore a human rights badge on the dais. He cautioned Norman about the situation, and used the words "They're screaming out for your blood, so consider yourself severely reprimanded. Now, you got any tickets for the hockey today?"

== Social life ==
Patching was a long-time resident of Point Lonsdale, Victoria, where his parents had lived and Patching grew up.

One of Patching's last official engagements in Geelong was his attendance at the Geelong Guild Athletic Club's Centenary Dinner in July 2008. Patching spoke at the dinner and along with fellow club Life Member, Mrs Patricia Agg, cut the club's centenary birthday cake.
