= Australian Olympic Committee =

- Country: Australia
- Code: AUS
- Created: 1920
- Recognized: 1920
- Continental Association: ONOC
- Headquarters: Sydney, Australia
- President: Ian Chesterman
- CEO: Mark Arbib
- Website: www.olympics.com.au

The Australian Olympic Committee (AOC) is the National Olympic Committee responsible for developing, promoting, and protecting the Olympic Movement in Australia. The AOC has the exclusive responsibility for the representation of Australia at the Olympic Games (Summer and Winter), the Youth Olympic Games and at Regional Games patronized by the International Olympic Committee (IOC). All National Olympic Committees (currently 206 worldwide) are constituents of the International Olympic Committee.

== History ==
Former logo (1953–2015).

In 1895, Australasia (a team composed of Australian and New Zealander athletes) achieves recognition by the International Olympic Committee (IOC). One year later, Australasian delegates competed at the 1896 Athens Olympics, with Australia being represented by Edwin Flack. Flack won two gold medals, becoming the first Australian Olympian and the first Australian medallist; their participation marked the beginning of Australia's unbroken representation at the Olympic Games. In 1905, Richard Coombes became Australia's first IOC member when he replaced New Zealander Leonard Cuff who represented Australasia.

At the beginning of the 20th century, with the Olympic movement growing around the world, Olympic councils were established in New South Wales, Victoria, Queensland, Tasmania, South Australia and New Zealand. Furthermore, the Olympic Federation of Australia and New Zealand (OFANZ) was formed in 1914 to comply with IOC regulations and allow an Australasian team to compete at the 1916 Olympics planned for Berlin. However, New Zealand had been agitating since 1911 to have its Olympic independence and, although the OFANZ was formed, it had no de facto existence by its lacking of central government. After World War I ended in November 1918, Coombes successfully argued to the IOC that Australasia should be split into Australia and New Zealand as Olympic nations. Finally, in April 1920, the federated Australian Olympic Council was formed and James Taylor was elected as its first president. In August 1923, the Australian Olympic Council changed its name to the Australian Olympic Federation (AOF) – an identity it was to hold until 1990 when it was renamed the Australian Olympic Committee.

After decades of success since its creation, the outcry over Australia's declining performances in Montreal 1976 led to the creation of the Federal Government-funded Australian Institute of Sport (AIS), a body with a close relationship with the AOC, providing essential assistance to athletes directly in their preparation for the Olympic Games. The AOC's commitment to winter sport saw the formation of the Olympic Winter Institute of Australia (OWIA) after Nagano 1998 to enable the development of elite performances in winter sports by Australian athletes.

Australia has hosted two Summer Olympics: 1956 Melbourne Olympics and 2000 Sydney Olympics. Brisbane, Queensland made a bid for the 1992 Summer Olympics and Melbourne, Australia made a bid for the 1996 Summer Olympics. Both failed. But, in June 2021, it was announced that Brisbane would host the 2032 Summer Olympics, marking Australia's third hosting of the games.

== Organisation ==
The Australian Olympic Committee (AOC) is an independent, incorporated not-for-profit organisation for the development of youth and sport in Australia. The AOC is responsible (for the International Olympic Committee (IOC)) to develop, promote and protect the Olympic movement in Australia in accordance with the Olympic Charter, and for selecting the Team that represents Australia at the Olympic Games, after considering nominations by each National Sport Federation. The AOC also selects Teams for Youth Olympic Games and Regional Games, such as the Pacific Games.

The AOC is composed of 44 member National Sport Federations, representing each sport on the Olympic program for the Summer Olympic Games and the Olympic Winter Games.

The AOC Executive comprises the President, Ian Chesterman, and Vice Presidents Evelyn Halls and Matt Allen who were elected along with him in 2022. The Chief Executive Officer is Mark Arbib.

Patron in Chief is the Governor-General of the Commonwealth of Australia, General Sam Mostyn, and Patron is the Prime Minister of Australia, currently The Hon Anthony Albanese MP.

The AOC has an Athletes' Commission, responsible for advising the AOC Executive on all matters pertaining to the Olympic Movement from an athlete's perspective. The chair is Brodie Summers (Freestyle Skiing – Moguls) while the deputy chair is Alyce Wood (Canoe Sprint). Remaining members are Georgia Baker (Cycling), Andrew Charter (Hockey), Sally Fitzgibbons (Surfing), Jessica Fox (Paddle), Joshua Hicks (Rowing), Henry Hutchison (Rugby Sevens), Conor Nicholas (Sailing), Greta Small (Alpine Skiing), Anabelle Smith (Diving), Ken Wallace (Paddle), Rowena Webster (Water Polo), Alex Wilson (Indigenous representative) and Patrick Johnson (Athletics).

== Administration ==
=== Presidents/Chair ===
- James Taylor (1920–1944)
- Sir Harold Alderson (1944–1973)
- Sir Edgar Tanner (1973–1977)
- Sydney Grange (1977–1985)
- Kevan Gosper (1985–1990)
- John Coates (1990–2022)
- Ian Chesterman (2022–present)

=== Honorary Secretary/Secretary-General ===
- George Shand (acting) (1920)
- Oswald G H Merrett (1921–1924)
- James S W Eve (1924–1947)
- Sir Edgar Tanner(1947–1973)
- Julius L Patching (1973–1985)
- Phillip Coles (1985–1993)
- Perry Crosswhite (1993–1995)
- Craig McLatchey (1995–2001)
- Robert Elphinston (2001–2004)
- Craig Phillips (2005–2014)
- Fiona de Jong (2014–2016)*
- Matt Carroll AM (2017–2025)
- Mark Arbib (2025 - )

*As of 2015, the Secretary General position is now known as chief executive officer.

=== International Olympic Committee members ===
Leonard A Cuff (1894–1905) (New Zealander who represented Australasia), Richard Coombes (1905–1932), James Taylor (1924–1944), Sir Harold Luxton (1933–1951), Hugh R Weir, (1946–1975), Lewis Luxton (1951–1974), David H Mckenzie (1974–1981), Kevan Gosper, (1977–2013), Phillip W Coles (1982–2011), Susan O'Neill, (2000–2005), John D Coates (2001–2024), James Tomkins (2013–2021), Jessica Fox (2024- ), Ian Chesterman (2025- )

== Funding ==
The AOC is not government funded. The AOC sources its revenues primarily through sponsorship, licensing, fundraising activities, grants from the International Olympic Committee (known as Olympic Solidarity) and annual distributions from the Australian Olympic Foundation. The Commonwealth Government, through the Australian Sports Commission and the Australian Institute of Sport, is the major funding source for high performance sport in Australia. While the AOC neither seeks nor derives any funding from the Commonwealth, ASC/AIS and State Institutes and Academies of Sport provide critical assistance to the AOCs member National Sport Federations and to athletes directly for their preparation for the Olympic Games.

AOC's total quadrennial funding of its programs for the period 2017–2020 was budgeted at over $43 million.

=== State Olympic Advisory Committees ===
State Olympic Advisory Committees (SOAC) is one of the state-based funds to support the Australian Olympic Team. It consist of a network of State/Territory Olympic Advisory Committees and State Olympic Councils in seven states and territories of Australia, each one representing the AOC in their respective borders. SOAC funds are raised through public events held in each State and Territory which are supported by companies and individuals.

=== Australian Olympians Association ===
The Australian Olympians Association (AOA) is another of the main funds to Australian Olympians. AOA is an association led by the AOC who provides a connection for all Olympians through functions and events and brings economic support for Olympians in need.

== Media coverage ==
Nine Network is the official broadcaster of the Summer and Winter Olympics since 2023 after a three-year commercial sponsorship deal with the AOC, and has the Olympic broadcast rights until 2032. Under an agreement with Nine Network, ABC Local Radio has the radio broadcast license for the 2024 Summer Olympics to listeners across its regional radio network.

== Community programs ==
Since 2018, the AOC has expanded its outreach programs into Australian primary and secondary education with the aim of promoting high performance sport in schools. For example, "Australian Olympic Pathway Schools", one of the programs carried out, is selecting and supporting schools who have an established elite athlete development sport program. Others such as "Indigenous Basketball Australia" are providing training to Aboriginal and Torres Strait Islander scholar coaches.

The AOC is a signatory to the United Nations Sports for Climate Action Framework, and has committed to reducing its carbon emissions by 50 percent by 2030 and achieving net zero by 2040 for sustainability.

== See also ==
- Australia at the Olympics
- Australian Youth Olympic Festival
- Australian Sports Commission
- Australian Institute of Sport
- Sport in Australia
- Boxing Kangaroo
- Olympic Winter Institute of Australia
- Australian Olympic Foundation
- Commonwealth Games Australia
- Paralympics Australia

== Bibliography ==
- Andrews, Malcolm. Australia at the Olympics. Rev. ed. Sydney, ABC Books for the Australian Broadcasting Corporation, 2000.
- Australian Olympic Committee. The compendium : official Australian Olympic statistics, 1896–2002 / compiled by the Australian Olympic Committee. St. Lucia., Qld., University of Queensland Press, c2003
- Gordon, Harry. From Athens with pride : the official history of the Australian Olympic movement, 1894 to 2014. St Lucia, Qld., University of Queensland Press, 2014.
- Gordon, Harry. Gold! : an Olympic celebration. Melbourne : Wilkinson Publishing, 2008
- Poke, Robin ad Berry, Kevin (eds). Olympic gold : our greatest individual Olympians since 1896. Sydney, Murdoch Books, 2012.
