= Edgar Tanner =

Australian politician

Sir Edgar Stephen Tanner, CBE (10 August 1904 - 21 November 1979) was an Australian sports administrator and Victorian politician. He was a former secretary-general and president of the Australian Olympic Federation and Chairman of the Australian Commonwealth Games Association.

== Personal ==
Tanner was born on 10 August 1904 at Albany, Western Australia. He was the eldest of four children. He attended All Saints Grammar School, St Kilda and studied commerce at the University of Melbourne. He joined the advertising staff of the Herald and Weekly Times. On 11 June 1938, he married Edna May Ponsonby. He died on 21 November 1979 at North Caulfield and was survived by his wife Edna, daughter Anne and son Ted, a former member of the Victorian Parliament and boxing administrator.

== Military career ==
In 1929, Tanner had been commissioned in the Militia. In November 1941, Tanner was appointed temporary captain in the 2nd Australian Imperial Force. He was a member of the Gull Force. In January 1942, he became prisoner of war after Gull Force was overpowered by the Japanese in Ambon. Whilst a prisoner of war at Hainan, he organised sports events including a running race between Australian and Dutch prisoners.

== Political career ==
In May 1955, Tanner representing the Liberal and Country Party, won the seat of Ripponlea in the Victorian Legislative Assembly. After Tanner was elected a member of parliament, the media questioned his ability to concurrently serve in important Olympic positions including secretary of the Organising Committee of the 1956 Melbourne Olympics as well as a member of Parliament. When Ripponlea was abolished in 1967, he was elected to Caulfield which he held until in retirement in February 1976. Whilst in the parliament, he was chairman of several committees and deputy-speaker from 1970 to 1973. His son Ted was the member for Caulfield from 1979 to 1996.

== Sports administration career ==
=== Boxing ===
Tanner won a University of Melbourne blue for boxing and fought in 150 featherweight bouts and lost seven. He was appointed secretary of the Victorian Amateur Boxing and Wrestling Association in the 1930s. He managed Australia's boxing and wrestling team at the 1938 Sydney British Empire Games, Sydney. In 1979, he stepped down as president of the Amateur Boxing Union of Australia, a position that he held for over 20 years.

=== Olympic Games ===
In June 1946, Tanner was elected secretary-treasurer Victorian Olympic Council (VOC) This election led to his campaign with Bill Uren, VOC Chairman, for Melbourne to host the 1956 Summer Olympics. Tanner and Uren gained the support of the then Lord Mayor of Melbourne, Sir James Connelly, and Sir Frank Beaurepaire, a former Lord Mayor. Beaurepaire's standing in the Olympic movement is stated as a major factor for the successful Melbourne Olympic bid. Tanner served as the secretary of the Organising Committee of 1956 Melbourne Olympic Games. In May 1947, at the Australian Olympic Federation's first meeting since World War II, Tanner was elected secretary-general., a position that he held until 1974. He was General Manager of the Australian team at the 1948 London Olympics. He was president of the Australian Olympic Federation from 1974 to 1977. His presidency came to an end when defeated by Sydney Grange in a ballot in 1977.

=== Commonwealth Games ===
He held various positions including Chairman with the Australian Commonwealth Games Association from 1974 to 1977.

== Honours ==
- 1957 - The Order of the British Empire - Commander (Civil) for Secretary of the Olympic Games Committee
- 1968 - Knight Bachelor for Secretary of the Australian Olympic Federation
- Life Member Australian Olympic Committee
- Life Member Commonwealth Games Australia
- Sir Edgar Tanner Trophy is for the best performed team at the Australian Boxing Championships
