= Richard Coombes =

Journalist and sports administrator (1858–1935)

Richard Coombes (17 March 1858 – 15 April 1935) was an English journalist.

He was an International Olympic Committee member from 1905 to 1932.

Coombes was inducted into the Sport Australia Hall of Fame in 1992.
