= Germany at the 2008 Summer Olympics =

- IOC code: GER
- NOC: German Olympic Sports Confederation
- Website: www.dosb.de (in German, English, and French)

in Beijing
- Competitors: 463 in 26 sports
- Flag bearers: Dirk Nowitzki (opening); Katrin Wagner-Augustin (closing)
- Medals Ranked 5th: Gold 16 Silver 11 Bronze 14 Total 41

Summer Olympics appearances (overview)
- 1896; 1900; 1904; 1908; 1912; 1920–1924; 1928; 1932; 1936; 1948; 1952; 1956–1988; 1992; 1996; 2000; 2004; 2008; 2012; 2016; 2020; 2024; 2028

Other related appearances
- 1906 Intercalated Games –––– Saar (1952); United Team of Germany (1956–1964); East Germany (1968–1988); West Germany (1968–1988)

Germany competed at the 2008 Summer Olympics in Beijing, People's Republic of China. A total of 439 athletes were nominated to participate in the Games. The German Olympic Sports Confederation (German: Deutscher Olympischer Sportbund, DOSB) nominated athletes on 29 May, 23 June and 15 July 2008. Reaching the qualification standard set by the relevant sport's international governing body did not automatically mean that the athlete was nominated for Beijing, as the DOSB had stricter qualification standards. An athlete needed to have a somewhat realistic chance for a top 12 position. An exception to this are the team events, as the number of competing teams is already very limited through the IOC standards, and a chance for a respective place is already given by the qualification.

== Medalists ==
Medal	Name	Sport	Event	Date
Gold	Alexander Grimm	Canoeing	Men's slalom K-1	August 12
Gold	Ole Bischof	Judo	Men's 81 kg	August 12
Gold	Peter Thomsen; Frank Ostholt; Hinrich Romeike; Ingrid Klimke; Andreas Dibowski	Equestrian	Team eventing	August 12
Gold	Hinrich Romeike	Equestrian	Individual eventing	August 12
Gold	Benjamin Kleibrink	Fencing	Men's foil	August 13
Gold	Britta Heidemann	Fencing	Women's épée	August 13
Gold	Heike Kemmer; Nadine Capellmann; Isabell Werth	Equestrian	Team dressage	August 14
Gold	Britta Steffen	Swimming	Women's 100 m freestyle	August 14
Gold	Britta Steffen	Swimming	Women's 50 m freestyle	August 17
Gold	Jan Frodeno	Triathlon	Men's triathlon	August 19
Gold	Matthias Steiner	Weightlifting	Men's +105 kg	August 19
Gold	Martin Hollstein; Andreas Ihle	Canoeing	Men's K-2 1000 m	August 22
Gold	Fanny Fischer; Nicole Reinhardt; Katrin Wagner-Augustin; Conny Waßmuth	Canoeing	Women's K-4 500 m	August 22
Gold	Lena Schöneborn	Modern pentathlon	Women's event	August 22
Gold	Sabine Spitz	Cycling	Women's cross-country	August 23
Gold	Germany national field hockey team: Sebastian Biederlack; Moritz Fuerste; Tobias Hauke; Florian Keller; Oliver Korn; Niklas Meinert; Maximillian Mueller; Carlos Nevado; Max Weinhold; Timo Weß; Benjamin Weß; Tibor Weißenborn; Philip Witte; Matthias Witthaus; Christopher Zeller; Philipp Zeller	Field hockey	Men's tournament	August 23
Silver	Patrick Hausding; Sascha Klein	Diving	Men's 10 m synchronized platform	August 11
Silver	Mirko Englich	Wrestling	Men's Greco-Roman 96 kg	August 14
Silver	Ralf Schumann	Shooting	Men's 25 metre rapid fire pistol	August 16
Silver	Annekatrin Thiele; Christiane Huth	Rowing	Women's double sculls	August 16
Silver	Roger Kluge	Cycling	Men's points race	August 16
Silver	Oksana Chusovitina	Gymnastics	Women's vault	August 17
Silver	Timo Boll; Dimitrij Ovtcharov; Christian Süß	Table tennis	Men's team	August 18
Silver	Isabell Werth	Equestrian	Individual dressage	August 19
Silver	Christian Gille; Tomasz Wylenzek	Canoeing	Men's C-2 1000 metres	August 22
Silver	Ronald Rauhe; Tim Wieskötter	Canoeing	Men's K-2 500 metres	August 23
Silver	Christina Obergföll	Athletics	Women's javelin throw	August 21
Bronze	Munkhbayar Dorjsuren	Shooting	Women's 25m pistol	August 13
Bronze	Christine Brinker	Shooting	Women's skeet	August 14
Bronze	René Enders; Maximilian Levy; Stefan Nimke	Cycling	Men's team sprint	August 15
Bronze	Christian Reitz	Shooting	Men's 25 metre rapid fire pistol	August 16
Bronze	Britta Oppelt; Manuela Lutze; Kathrin Boron; Stephanie Schiller	Rowing	Women's quadruple sculls	August 17
Bronze	Jan Peter Peckolt; Hannes Peckolt	Sailing	49er class	August 17
Bronze	Ditte Kotzian; Heike Fischer	Diving	Women's 3 m synchronized springboard	August 17
Bronze	Fabian Hambüchen	Gymnastics	Men's horizontal bar	August 19
Bronze	Heike Kemmer	Equestrian	Individual dressage	August 19
Bronze	Thomas Lurz	Swimming	Men's 10 km open water	August 21
Bronze	Germany women's national football team: Nadine Angerer; Fatmire Bajramaj; Saskia Bartusiak; Melanie Behringer; Linda Bresonik; Kerstin Garefrekes; Ariane Hingst; Ursula Holl; Annike Krahn; Simone Laudehr; Renate Lingor; Anja Mittag; Célia Okoyino da Mbabi; Babett Peter; Conny Pohlers; Birgit Prinz; Sandra Smisek; Kerstin Stegemann	Football	Women's tournament	August 21
Bronze	Lutz Altepost; Norman Bröckl; Torsten Eckbrett; Björn Goldschmidt	Canoeing	Men's K-4 1000 m	August 22
Bronze	Christian Gille; Tomasz Wylenzek	Canoeing	Men's C-2 500 m	August 23
Bronze	Katrin Wagner-Augustin	Canoeing	Women's K-1 500 m	August 23

== Archery ==
Athlete	Event	Ranking round		Round of 64	Round of 32	Round of 16	Quarterfinals	Semifinals	Final / BM	
Athlete	Event	Score	Seed	Opposition Score	Opposition Score	Opposition Score	Opposition Score	Opposition Score	Opposition Score	Rank
Jens Pieper	Men's individual	648	45	Serdyuk (UKR) (20); L 105–107	Did not advance					
Anja Hitzler	Women's individual	629	33	Dodemont (FRA) (32); W 107–106	Park S-H (KOR) (1); L 107–112	Did not advance				

== Athletics ==
Key

- Note–Ranks given for track events are within the athlete's heat only
- Q = Qualified for the next round
- q = Qualified for the next round as a fastest loser or, in field events, by position without achieving the qualifying target
- NR = National record
- N/A = Round not applicable for the event
- Bye = Athlete not required to compete in round

Men
Track & road events

Athlete	Event	Heat		Quarterfinal		Semifinal		Final	
Athlete	Event	Result	Rank	Result	Rank	Result	Rank	Result	Rank
André Höhne	20 km walk	—N/a						1:23:13	25
André Höhne	50 km walk	—N/a						3:49:52	12
Carsten Schlangen	1500 m	3:36.34	6 q	—N/a		3:37.94	8	Did not advance	
Tobias Unger	100 m	10.46	4 q	10.36	7	Did not advance			
Marius Broening; Till Helmke; Martin Keller; Alexander Kosenkow; Ronny Ostwald; Tobias Unger	4 × 100 m relay	38.93	3 Q	—N/a				38.58	4
Ruwen Faller; Kamghe Gaba; Simon Kirch; Florian Seitz; Bastian Swillims	4 × 400 m relay	3:03.49	4	—N/a				Did not advance	

Field events

Athlete	Event	Qualification		Final	
Athlete	Event	Distance	Position	Distance	Position
Sebastian Bayer	Long jump	7.77	23	Did not advance	
Danny Ecker	Pole vault	5.65	=9 q	5.70	6
Markus Esser	Hammer throw	77.60	6 q	77.10	9
Robert Harting	Discus throw	64.19	8 q	67.09	4
Raphael Holzdeppe	Pole vault	5.65	=3 q	5.60	8
Tim Lobinger	Pole vault	5.55	=16	Did not advance	
Peter Sack	Shot put	20.01	13	Did not advance	
Raúl Spank	High jump	2.29	5 Q	2.32	5
Stephan Steding	Javelin throw	70.05	32	Did not advance	
Alexander Vieweg	Javelin throw	67.49	35	Did not advance	

Combined events – Decathlon

Athlete	Event	100 m	LJ	SP	HJ	400 m	110H	DT	PV	JT	1500 m	Final	Rank
Arthur Abele	Result	10.90	6.47	13.55	1.90	DNS	—	—	—	—	—	DNF	
Arthur Abele	Points	883	691	701	714	0	—	—	—	—	—	DNF	
André Niklaus	Result	11.12	7.29	13.23	2.05	49.65	14.37	45.39	5.20	60.21	4:32.90	8220	7
André Niklaus	Points	834	883	681	850	831	927	775	972	741	726	8220	7
Michael Schrader	Result	10.80	7.70	13.67	1.99	48.47	14.71	40.41	4.80	60.27	4:26.77	8194	9
Michael Schrader	Points	906	985	708	794	886	885	673	849	742	766	8194	9

Women
Track & road events

Athlete	Event	Heat		Semifinal		Final	
Athlete	Event	Result	Rank	Result	Rank	Result	Rank
Susanne Hahn	Marathon	—N/a				2:38:31	52
Melanie Kraus	Marathon	—N/a				2:35:17	30
Sabrina Mockenhaupt	10000 m	—N/a				31:14.21	13
Antje Möldner	3000 m steeplechase	9:29.86 NR	7	—N/a		Did not advance	
Carolin Nytra	100 m hurdles	12.95	4 q	12.99	7	Did not advance	
Melanie Seeger	20 km walk	—N/a				1:31:56	23
Sabine Zimmer	20 km walk	—N/a				1:30:19	15
Anne Möllinger; Verena Sailer; Cathleen Tschirch; Marion Wagner; Katja Wakan	4 × 100 m relay	43.59	3 Q	—N/a		43.28	4
Esther Cremer; Florence Ekpo-Umoh; Claudia Hoffmann; Sorina Nwachukwu; Jonna Tilgner	4 × 400 m relay	3:25.55	4 q	—N/a		3:28.45	6

Field events

Athlete	Event	Qualification		Final	
Athlete	Event	Distance	Position	Distance	Position
Ariane Friedrich	High jump	1.93	=5 q	1.96	=7
Betty Heidler	Hammer throw	71.51	7 Q	70.06	9
Carolin Hingst	Pole vault	4.50	=10 q	4.65	6
Denise Hinrichs	Shot put	18.36	16	Did not advance	
Kathrin Klaas	Hammer throw	67.54	22	Did not advance	
Nadine Kleinert	Shot put	18.52	11 Q	19.01	7
Katharina Molitor	Javelin throw	60.92	9 q	59.64	8
Steffi Nerius	Javelin throw	63.94	3 Q	65.29	5
Christina Obergföll	Javelin throw	67.52	2 Q	66.13	2nd place, silver medalist(s)
Anastasija Reiberger	Pole vault	4.40	14	Did not advance	
Christina Schwanitz	Shot put	19.09	5 Q	18.27	11
Silke Spiegelburg	Pole vault	4.50	12 q	4.65	7

Combined events – Heptathlon

Athlete	Event	100H	HJ	SP	200 m	LJ	JT	800 m	Final	Rank
Sonja Kesselschläger	Result	13.50	1.77	14.33	25.50	6.04	44.28	2:15.94	6140	16*
Sonja Kesselschläger	Points	1050	941	816	841	862	750	880	6140	16*
Jennifer Oeser	Result	13.57	1.80	13.62	24.67	6.16	47.53	2:11.33	6360	11*
Jennifer Oeser	Points	1040	978	769	917	899	812	945	6360	11*
Lilli Schwarzkopf	Result	13.73	1.80	14.61	25.25	5.96	51.88	2:10.91	6379	8*
Lilli Schwarzkopf	Points	1017	978	835	864	837	897	951	6379	8*

* The athlete who finished in second place, Lyudmila Blonska of Ukraine, tested positive for a banned substance. Both the A and the B tests were positive, therefore Blonska was stripped of her silver medal, and all German heptathletes moved up a position.

== Badminton ==
Athlete	Event	Round of 64	Round of 32	Round of 16	Quarterfinal	Semifinal	Final / BM	
Athlete	Event	Opposition Score	Opposition Score	Opposition Score	Opposition Score	Opposition Score	Opposition Score	Rank
Marc Zwiebler	Men's singles	Evans (IRL); W 21–18, 18–21, 21–19	Smith (GBR); W 16–21, 21–13, 21–17	Lee H-i (KOR); L 13–21, 11–21	Did not advance			
Juliane Schenk	Women's singles	Yulianti (INA); L 21–18, 13–21, 20–22	Did not advance					
Xu Huaiwen	Women's singles	Bye	Nieminen (FIN); W 21–17, 21–8	Hallam (GBR); W 21–20, 21–7	Xie Xf (CHN); L 19–21, 20–22	Did not advance		
Kristof Hopp; Birgit Overzier	Mixed doubles	—N/a		Limpele / Marissa (INA); L 12–21, 12–21	Did not advance			

== Basketball ==
=== Men's tournament ===
Roster

The following is the Germany roster in the men's basketball tournament of the 2008 Summer Olympics.

Germany men's national basketball team – 2008 Summer Olympics roster
Players
Coaches

Pos.	No.	Name	Age – Date of birth	Height	Club	Ctr.
F/C	4	Tim Ohlbrecht	19 – August 30, 1988	6 ft 11 in (2.11 m)	Brose Baskets	(Germany)
SF	5	Philip Zwiener	23 – July 23, 1985	6 ft 7 in (2.01 m)	ALBA Berlin	(Germany)
PF	6	Sven Schultze	30 – July 11, 1978	6 ft 10 in (2.08 m)	Olympia Larissa BC	(Greece)
SG	7	Robert Garrett	31 – March 18, 1977	6 ft 4 in (1.93 m)	Brose Baskets	(Germany)
SF	8	Konrad Wysocki	26 – March 28, 1982	6 ft 8 in (2.03 m)	Deutsche Bank Skyliners	(Germany)
G	9	Steffen Hamann	27 – June 14, 1981	6 ft 5 in (1.96 m)	Brose Baskets	(Germany)
G	10	Demond Greene	29 – June 15, 1979	6 ft 1 in (1.85 m)	Brose Baskets	(Germany)
PG	11	Pascal Roller	31 – November 20, 1976	5 ft 11 in (1.8 m)	Deutsche Bank Skyliners	(Germany)
C	12	Chris Kaman	26 – April 28, 1982	7 ft 0 in (2.13 m)	Los Angeles Clippers	(United States)
C	13	Patrick Femerling	33 – March 4, 1975	7 ft 1 in (2.16 m)	ALBA Berlin	(Germany)
PF	14	Dirk Nowitzki (C)	30 – June 19, 1978	7 ft 0 in (2.13 m)	Dallas Mavericks	(United States)
F/C	15	Jan Jagla	27 – June 25, 1981	7 ft 0 in (2.13 m)	Joventut Badalona	(Spain)

Head coach

- (Germany) Dirk Bauermann

Legend

- (C) Team captain
- Club – describes last
  club before the tournament
- Age – describes age
  on August 9, 2008

Group play

Pos	Team	Pld	W	L	PF	PA	PD	Pts	Qualification
1	United States	5	5	0	515	354	+161	10	Quarterfinals
2	Spain	5	4	1	418	369	+49	9	Quarterfinals
3	Greece	5	3	2	415	375	+40	8	Quarterfinals
4	China (H)	5	2	3	366	400	−34	7	Quarterfinals
5	Germany	5	1	4	330	390	−60	6	
6	Angola	5	0	5	321	477	−156	5	

Source: FIBA archive
Rules for classification: 1) points; 2) head-to-head points; 3) head-to-head goal average; 4) head-to-head number of points scored.
(H) Hosts

10 August 2008
11:15

Report

Germany	95–66	Angola
Scoring by quarter: 25–21, 29–13, 24–18, 17–14
Pts: Kaman 24; Rebs: Jagla 11; Asts: Hamann 4		Pts: Mingas 24; Rebs: Gomes 8 Asts: Cipriano 2

Wukesong Indoor Stadium, Beijing
Attendance: 11,083
Referees: Romualdas Brazauskas (LTU)

12 August 2008
14:30

Report

Greece	87–64	Germany
Scoring by quarter: 21–23, 23–10, 25–15, 18–16
Pts: Spanoulis 23; Rebs: Bourousis 8 Asts: Spanoulis 5		Pts: Nowitzki 13; Rebs: Nowitzki 6 Asts: Greene 2

Wukesong Indoor Stadium, Beijing
Attendance: 11,083
Referees: Carl Jungebrand (FIN)

14 August 2008
09:00

Report

Germany	59–72	Spain
Scoring by quarter: 15–12, 21–27, 12–20, 11–13
Pts: Hamann 15; Rebs: Kaman 10; Asts: Hamann 3		Pts: Calderón 15; Rebs: M. Gasol 8 Asts: P. Gasol, Rubio 3

Wukesong Indoor Stadium, Beijing
Attendance: 11,083
Referees: Fabio Facchini (ITA)

16 August 2008
20:00

Report

China	59–55	Germany
Scoring by quarter: 19–9, 8–22, 20–8, 12–16
Pts: Yao 25; Rebs: Yao, Yi 11; Asts: Liu 3		Pts: Nowitzki 24; Rebs: Nowitzki 17; Asts: Hamann, Garrett 2

Wukesong Indoor Stadium, Beijing
Attendance: 11,083
Referees: Eddie Rush (USA)

18 August 2008
20:00

Report

United States	106–57	Germany
Scoring by quarter: 31–12, 22–17, 30–17, 23–11
Pts: Howard 22; Rebs: Howard 10; Asts: Williams 5		Pts: Nowitzki 14; Rebs: Nowitzki 8 Asts: Hamann, Jagla 2

Wukesong Indoor Stadium, Beijing
Attendance: 11,083
Referees: Juan Carlos Arteaga (ESP)

== Boxing ==
Athlete	Event	Round of 32	Round of 16	Quarterfinals	Semifinals	Final	
Athlete	Event	Opposition Result	Opposition Result	Opposition Result	Opposition Result	Opposition Result	Rank
Rustamhodza Rahimov	Bantamweight	Tojibaev (UZB); L 2–11	Did not advance				
Wilhelm Gratschow	Featherweight	Shili (TUN); L 5–14	Did not advance				
Jack Culcay-Keth	Welterweight	Kim J-J (KOR); L 11–11^{+}	Did not advance				
Konstantin Buga	Middleweight	Góngora (ECU); L 7–14	Did not advance				

== Canoeing ==
=== Slalom ===
Athlete	Event	Preliminary						Semifinal		Final			
Athlete	Event	Run 1	Rank	Run 2	Rank	Total	Rank	Time	Rank	Time	Rank	Total	Rank
Jan Benzien	Men's C-1	85.92	3	84.58	2	170.50	2 Q	95.15	12	Did not advance			
Alexander Grimm	Men's K-1	84.90	2	84.36	4	169.26	4 Q	87.31	4 Q	84.39	1	171.70	1st place, gold medalist(s)
Felix Michel; Sebastian Piersig	Men's C-2	96.04	3	96.33	4	192.37	5 Q	94.38	1 Q	110.05	6	204.43	6
Jennifer Bongardt	Women's K-1	92.79	1	94.58	5	189.37	4 Q	203.29	15	Did not advance			

=== Sprint ===
Men

Athlete	Event	Heats		Semifinals		Final	
Athlete	Event	Time	Rank	Time	Rank	Time	Rank
Andreas Dittmer	C-1 500 m	1:49.527	4 QS	1:53.182	4	Did not advance	
Andreas Dittmer	C-1 1000 m	4:00.505	2 QS	3:58.595	2 Q	3:57.894	8
Jonas Ems	K-1 500 m	1:38.819	2 QS	1:44.717	6	Did not advance	
Max Hoff	K-1 1000 m	3:30.316	3 QS	3:32.847	1 Q	3:29.391	5
Christian Gille; Thomasz Wylenzek	C-2 500 m	1:41.513	1 QF	Bye		1:41.964	3rd place, bronze medalist(s)
Christian Gille; Thomasz Wylenzek	C-2 1000 m	3:40.939	1 QF	Bye		3:36.588	2nd place, silver medalist(s)
Martin Hollstein; Andreas Ihle	K-2 1000 m	3:15.987	1 QF	Bye		3:11.809	1st place, gold medalist(s)
Ronald Rauhe; Tim Wieskötter	K-2 500 m	1:28.736	1 QF	Bye		1:28.827	2nd place, silver medalist(s)
Lutz Altepost; Norman Bröckl; Torsten Eckbrett; Bjorn Hogel Goldschmidt	K-4 1000 m	2:57.148	1 QF	Bye		2:56.676	3rd place, bronze medalist(s)

Women

Athlete	Event	Heats		Semifinals		Final	
Athlete	Event	Time	Rank	Time	Rank	Time	Rank
Katrin Wagner-Augustin	K-1 500 m	1:48.875	1 QF	Bye		1:51.022	3rd place, bronze medalist(s)
Fanny Fischer; Nicole Reinhardt	K-2 500 m	1:43.412	1 QF	Bye		1:42.899	4
Fanny Fischer; Nicole Reinhardt; Katrin Wagner-Augustin; Conny Waßmuth	K-4 500 m	1:33.912	1 QF	Bye		1:32.231	1st place, gold medalist(s)

Qualification Legend: QS = Qualify to semi-final; QF = Qualify directly to final

== Cycling ==
=== Road ===
Men

Athlete	Event	Time	Rank
Gerald Ciolek	Road race	Did not finish	
Bert Grabsch	Road race	Did not finish	
Bert Grabsch	Time trial	1:05:26	14
Stefan Schumacher	Road race	Did not finish	
Stefan Schumacher	Time trial	1:05:25	13
Jens Voigt	Road race	Did not finish	
Fabian Wegmann	Road race	6:26:17	21

Women

Athlete	Event	Time	Rank
Judith Arndt	Road race	3:33:51	41
Judith Arndt	Time trial	35:59.77	6
Hanka Kupfernagel	Road race	3:33:25	39
Hanka Kupfernagel	Time trial	36:35.05	11
Trixi Worrack	Road race	3:32:52	20

=== Track ===
Sprint

Athlete	Event	Qualification		Round 1	Round 2	Repechage 2	Quarterfinals	Semifinals	Final	
Athlete	Event	Time Speed (km/h)	Rank	Opposition Time Speed (km/h)	Opposition Time Speed (km/h)	Opposition Time Speed (km/h)	Opposition Time Speed (km/h)	Opposition Time Speed (km/h)	Opposition Time Speed (km/h)	Rank
Maximilian Levy	Men's sprint	10.199; 70.595	6 Q	Mulder (NED); W 10.840; 66.420	Bayley (AUS); W 10.763; 66.895	Bye	Mulder (NED); W 10.689, W 10.660	Kenny (GBR); W 10.594, W 10.335	Bourgain (FRA); L, W 10.666, L	4
Stefan Nimke	Men's sprint	10.064; 71.542	3 Q	Zhang L (CHN); W 10.828; 66.494	Mulder (NED); L 10.888; 66.127	Awang (MAS); Chiappa (ITA); L	Did not advance		9th place final Chiappa (ITA); Bayley (AUS); Watanabe (JPN); W 11.051	9
René Enders; Maximilian Levy; Stefan Nimke	Men's team sprint	44.197; 61.090	3 Q	Japan; W 43.699; 62.741	—N/a				Australia; W 44.014; 61.344	3rd place, bronze medalist(s)

Pursuit

Athlete	Event	Qualification		Semifinals		Final	
Athlete	Event	Time	Rank	Opponent Results	Rank	Opponent Results	Rank
Verena Jooß	Women's individual pursuit	3:34.480	11	Did not advance			

Keirin

Athlete	Event	1st round	Repechage	2nd round	Finals
Athlete	Event	Rank	Rank	Rank	Rank
Carsten Bergemann	Men's keirin	5 Q	Bye	3 Q	5
Maximilian Levy	Men's keirin	7 R	2	Did not advance	

Omnium

Athlete	Event	Points	Laps	Rank
Roger Kluge	Men's points race	58	2	2nd place, silver medalist(s)
Verena Jooß	Women's points race	Did not finish		
Roger Kluge; Olaf Pollack	Men's madison	15	–1	5

=== Mountain biking ===
Men

Athlete	Event	Time	Rank
Manuel Fumic	Men's cross-country	2:01:16	11
Wolfram Kurschat	Men's cross-country	LAP (2 laps)	33
Moritz Milatz	Men's cross-country	2:02:59	16
Adelheid Morath	Women's cross-country	2:02:25	18
Sabine Spitz	Women's cross-country	1:45:11	1st place, gold medalist(s)

== Diving ==
Men

Athlete	Events	Preliminaries		Semifinals		Final	
Athlete	Events	Points	Rank	Points	Rank	Points	Rank
Patrick Hausding	3 m springboard	451.65	11 Q	481.50	5 Q	462.05	8
Pavlo Rozenberg	3 m springboard	431.65	16 Q	454.40	12 Q	485.60	5
Patrick Hausding	10 m platform	423.40	17 Q	453.30	10 Q	448.30	9
Sascha Klein	10 m platform	453.80	10 Q	382.85	18	Did not advance	
Sascha Klein; Pavlo Rozenberg	3 m synchronized springboard	—N/a				402.84	6
Patrick Hausding; Sascha Klein	10 m synchronized platform	—N/a				450.42	2nd place, silver medalist(s)

Women

Athlete	Events	Preliminaries		Semifinals		Final	
Athlete	Events	Points	Rank	Points	Rank	Points	Rank
Katja Dieckow	3 m springboard	302.70	9 Q	263.00	18	Did not advance	
Ditte Kotzian	3 m springboard	282.80	16 Q	292.25	15	Did not advance	
Annett Gamm	10 m platform	234.30	29	Did not advance			
Christin Steuer	10 m platform	290.80	19	Did not advance			
Ditte Kotzian; Heike Fischer	3 m synchronized springboard	—N/a				318.90	3rd place, bronze medalist(s)
Annett Gamm; Nora Subschinski	10 m synchronized platform	—N/a				310.29	4

== Equestrian ==
=== Dressage ===
Athlete	Horse	Event	Grand Prix		Grand Prix Special		Grand Prix Freestyle		Overall	
Athlete	Horse	Event	Score	Rank	Score	Rank	Score	Rank	Score	Rank
Nadine Capellmann	Elvis VA	Individual	70.083	9 Q	67.240	17	Did not advance			
Heike Kemmer	Bonaparte	Individual	72.250	3 Q	72.960	3 Q	75.950	4	74.445	3rd place, bronze medalist(s)
Isabell Werth	Satchmo	Individual	76.417	1 Q	75.200	1 Q	78.100	2	76.650	2nd place, silver medalist(s)
Nadine Capellmann; Heike Kemmer; Isabell Werth	See above	Team	72.917	1	—N/a				72.917	1st place, gold medalist(s)

After the Grand Prix, the score of each individual rider is cleared, meaning only the scores of the Grand Prix Special and the Grand Prix Freestyle add up to the final score and are relevant for the rank of a rider in the individual competition. Only the 15 best riders of the Grand Prix Special advance to the Freestyle.

=== Eventing ===
Athlete	Horse	Event	Dressage		Cross-country			Jumping						Total	
Athlete	Horse	Event	Dressage		Cross-country			Qualifier			Final			Total	
Athlete	Horse	Event	Penalties	Rank	Penalties	Total	Rank	Penalties	Total	Rank	Penalties	Total	Rank	Penalties	Rank
Andreas Dibowski	Butts Leon	Individual	39.60	11	17.60	57.20	8	0.00	57.20	5 Q	8.00	65.20	8	65.20	8
Ingrid Klimke	Abraxxas	Individual	33.50	3	17.20	50.70	2	4.00	54.70	2 Q	5.00	59.70	5	59.70	5
Frank Ostholt	Mr. Medicott	Individual	44.60 #	21	13.20	57.80 #	12	0.00	57.80 #	8	Did not advance			57.80	25
Hinrich Romeike	Marius	Individual	37.40	7	12.80	50.20	1	4.00	54.20	1 Q	0.00	54.20	1	54.20	1st place, gold medalist(s)
Peter Thomsen	The Ghost of Hamish	Individual	53.30 #	46	25.60	98.90 #	44	4.00	102.90 #	38	Did not advance			102.90	38
Andreas Dibowski; Ingrid Klimke; Frank Ostholt; Hinrich Romeike; Peter Thomsen	See above	Team	110.50	2	47.60	158.10	1	8.00	166.10	1	—N/a			166.10	1st place, gold medalist(s)

# - Indicates that points do not count in team total
Only a certain number of individual riders are allowed to advance to the final and of one nation, maximal three individual riders can advance. The riders who did not advance to the individual final are ranked after all of the riders who did, their final rank being determined by their total penalties gained in the competition up to that point (dressage, cross-country and jumping qualifier).

=== Show jumping ===
Athlete	Horse	Event	Qualification								Final					Total	
Athlete	Horse	Event	Round 1		Round 2			Round 3			Round A		Round B			Total	
Athlete	Horse	Event	Penalties	Rank	Penalties	Total	Rank	Penalties	Total	Rank	Penalties	Rank	Penalties	Total	Rank	Penalties	Rank
Christian Ahlmann	Coster	Individual	10	=56	8	18	40 Q	4	22	31	Did not advance					22	31
Ludger Beerbaum	All Inclusive	Individual	10	=56	8	18	40 Q	6	24	33 Q	4	11 Q	0	4	=3 JO	8	7
Marco Kutscher	Cornet Obolensky	Individual	6	46	13	19	44 Q	29	38	43	Did not advance					38	43
Meredith Michaels-Beerbaum	Shutterfly	Individual	6	46	4	10	26 Q	4	14	16 Q	4	11 Q	0	4	=3 JO	4	4
Christian Ahlmann; Ludger Beerbaum; Marco Kutscher; Meredith Michaels-Beerbaum	See above	Team	—N/a								20	8	14	34	=4	34	=4

After the team qualifier, the penalty score of each team is cleared, so that only the penalties of the two rounds of the team final, which are added up and together amount to the final score of a team, are relevant for the final rank. Likewise, every individual rider goes into the individual final without any penalties, for the penalties of all three individual qualifiers are deleted beforehand. In determining a rider's rank in the individual competition, only the penalties of both round of the individual final, which together amount to the final score of a rider, are relevant.

Only a certain number of individual riders are allowed to advance to the individual final and of one nation maximal three individual riders can advance. The riders who did not advance to the individual final are ranked after all of the riders who did, their final rank being determined by their total penalties gained in the individual qualifiers. Likewise, if a jump-off is required, every rider starts with a clear score, not taking previous penalties with him or her. The rider with the fewest penalties in the fastest time wins the jump-off.

== Fencing ==
Men

Athlete	Event	Round of 64	Round of 32	Round of 16	Quarterfinal	Semifinal	Final / BM	
Athlete	Event	Opposition Score	Opposition Score	Opposition Score	Opposition Score	Opposition Score	Opposition Score	Rank
Peter Joppich	Individual foil	—N/a	Bye	Kruse (GBR); W 10–9	Ota (JPN); L 12–15	Did not advance		
Benjamin Kleibrink	Individual foil	—N/a	Bye	Chida (JPN); W 15–10	Lei S (CHN); W 15–7	Zhu J (CHN); W 15–4	Ota (JPN); W 15–9	1st place, gold medalist(s)
Nicolas Limbach	Individual sabre	Bye	Koniusz (POL); W 15–7	Buikevich (BLR); L 14–15	Did not advance			

Women

Athlete	Event	Round of 64	Round of 32	Round of 16	Quarterfinal	Semifinal	Final / BM	
Athlete	Event	Opposition Score	Opposition Score	Opposition Score	Opposition Score	Opposition Score	Opposition Score	Rank
Imke Duplitzer	Individual épée	—N/a	Bye	Jiménez (PAN); W 15–10	Mincza-Nébald (HUN); L 11–15	Did not advance		
Britta Heidemann	Individual épée	—N/a	Bye	Jung H-J (KOR); W 12–5	Samuelsson (SWE); W 15–10	Li N (CHN); W 15–13	Brânză (ROU); W 15–11	1st place, gold medalist(s)
Carolin Golubytskyi	Individual foil	Bye	Thompson (USA); W 13–5	Sugawara (JPN); L 5–6	Did not advance			
Anja Schache	Individual foil	Bye	Lamonova (RUS); L 2–15	Did not advance				
Katja Wächter	Individual foil	Doig (PER); W 15–4	Stahl (ROU); W 15–6	Maîtrejean (FRA); W 15–10	Trillini (ITA); L 8–15	Did not advance		
Carolin Golubytskyi; Anja Schache; Katja Wächter; Melanie Wolgast	Team foil	—N/a			Hungary; L 31–35	Classification semi-final Poland; W 32–27	5th place final China; W 34–28	5
Alexandra Bujdoso	Individual sabre	Cloutier (CAN); W 15–2	Tan X (CHN); L 6–15	Did not advance				

== Field hockey ==
=== Men's tournament ===
Roster

The following is the German roster in the men's field hockey tournament of the 2008 Summer Olympics.

Head Coach: Markus Weise

3. Philip Witte
4. Maximilian Müller
5. Sebastian Biederlack
7. Carlos Nevado
9. Moritz Fürste
13. Tobias Hauke
14. Tibor Weißenborn
15. Benjamin Weß
16. Niklas Meinert
17. Timo Weß (c)
18. Oliver Korn
19. Christopher Zeller
21. Max Weinhold (GK)
22. Matthias Witthaus
23. Florian Keller
25. Philipp Zeller

Reserve:

2. Christian Schulte
10. Jan-Marco Montag

Group play

Pos	Team	Pld	W	D	L	GF	GA	GD	Pts	Qualification
1	Spain	5	4	0	1	9	5	+4	12	Semi-finals
2	Germany	5	3	2	0	12	6	+6	11	Semi-finals
3	South Korea	5	2	1	2	13	11	+2	7	Fifth place game
4	New Zealand	5	2	1	2	10	9	+1	7	Seventh place game
5	Belgium	5	1	1	3	9	13	−4	4	Ninth place game
6	China (H)	5	0	1	4	7	16	−9	1	Eleventh place game

(H) Hosts

11 August 2008
08:30

Germany	4–1	China
C. Zeller 21'; Keller 43', 54'; Nevado 68'	Report	Na Yubo 7'

Umpires:
David Leiper (GBR)
Satinder Kumar (IND)

13 August 2008
18:30

Belgium	1–1	Germany
Charlier 22'	Report	Witthaus 19'

Umpires:
Rob ten Cate (NED)
David Gentles (AUS)

15 August 2008
20:30

South Korea	3–3	Germany
Yeo Woon-kon 5'; Jang Jong-hyun 46'; Seo Jong-ho 52'	Report	Witte 17'; Witthaus 40'; C. Zeller 47'

Umpires:
John Wright (RSA)
Satinder Kumar (IND)

17 August 2008
21:00

Germany	1–0	Spain
Fürste 34'	Report

Umpires:
John Wright (RSA)
David Gentles (AUS)

19 August 2008
10:30

Germany	3–1	New Zealand
T. Weß 5'; Witthaus 9'; Keller 55'	Report	H. Shaw 46'

Umpires:
David Gentles (AUS)
Andy Mair (GBR)

Semifinal

21 August 2008
18:00

Netherlands	1–1 (a.e.t.)	Germany
Hoyng 66'	Report	P. Zeller 68'
Penalties
Taekema (penalty shoot-out scored); R. Brouwer (penalty shoot-out scored); Reckers (penalty shoot-out missed); Weusthof (penalty shoot-out missed); De Nooijer (penalty shoot-out scored) --- Taekema (penalty shoot-out missed)	3–4	(penalty shoot-out scored) C. Zeller; (penalty shoot-out missed) Keller; (penalty shoot-out scored) Meinert; (penalty shoot-out missed) P. Zeller; (penalty shoot-out scored) Weißenborn --- (penalty shoot-out scored) C. Zeller

Umpires:
David Gentles (AUS)
John Wright (RSA)

Gold medal match

23 August 2008
20:30

(gold) Germany	1–0	Spain (silver)
C. Zeller 16'	Report

Umpires:
Henrik Ehlers (DEN)
David Gentles (AUS)

=== Women's tournament ===
Roster

The following is the German roster in the women's field hockey tournament of the 2008 Summer Olympics.

Head Coach: Michael Behrmann

2. Tina Bachmann
4. Mandy Haase
7. Natascha Keller
9. Martina Heinlein
11. Eileen Hoffmann
13. Marion Rodewald (c)
14. Katharina Scholz
16. Fanny Rinne
18. Anke Kühn
22. Janine Beermann
24. Maike Stöckel
25. Janne Müller-Wieland
26. Christina Schütze
27. Pia Eidmann
28. Julia Müller
32. Kristina Reynolds (GK)

Reserve:

1. Yvonne Frank
29. Lina Geyer

Group play

Team	Pld	W	D	L	GF	GA	GD	Pts	Qualification
Germany	5	4	0	1	12	8	+4	12	Advanced to semifinals
Argentina	5	3	2	0	13	7	+6	11	Advanced to semifinals
Great Britain	5	2	2	1	7	9	−2	8	
United States	5	1	3	1	9	8	+1	6	
Japan	5	1	1	3	5	7	−2	4	
New Zealand	5	0	0	5	6	13	−7	0	

10 August 2008
21:00

Germany	5–1	Great Britain
Rinne 26', 52'; Hoffmann 31', 49'; Rodewald 60'	Report	Cullen 29'

Umpires:
Sarah Garnett (NZL)
Miao Lin (CHN)

12 August 2008
21:00

Germany	2–1	New Zealand
Scholz 59'; Kühn 69'	Report	Forgesson 31'

Umpires:
Anne McRae (GBR)
Soledad Iparruguirre (ARG)

14 August 2008
10:30

United States	2–4	Germany
Snow 27'; Loy 60'	Report	Keller 34'; Rinne 49'; Rodewald 55'; Kühn 64'

Umpires:
Lee Keum-ju (KOR)
Marelize de Klerk (RSA)

16 August 2008
18:00

Germany	0–4	Argentina
	Report	Burkart 38'; Gulla 49', 66'; Aymar 68'

Umpires:
Lisa Roach (AUS)
Chieko Soma (JPN)

18 August 2008
08:30

Germany	1–0	Japan
Beermann 40'	Report

Umpires:
Julie Ashton-Lucy (AUS)
Miao Lin (CHN)

Semifinal

20 August 2008
18:00

Germany	2–3	China
Keller 4'; Beermann 36'	Report	Gao Lihua 31'; Ma Yibo 39'; Zhao Yudiao 58'

Umpires:
Carolina de la Fuente (ARG)
Julie Ashton-Lucy (AUS)

Bronze medal match

22 August 2008
18:00

Germany	1–3	Argentina (bronze)
Kühn 45'	Report	Luchetti 11'; Rebecchi 22'; Barrionuevo 63'

Umpires:
Julie Ashton-Lucy (AUS)
Marelize de Klerk (RSA)

== Football ==
=== Women's tournament ===
Roster

Head coach: Silvia Neid

Germany named a squad of 18 players and 4 alternates for the tournament.

No.	Pos.	Player	Date of birth (age)	Caps	Goals	Club
1	GK	Nadine Angerer	10 November 1978 (aged 29)	62	0	(Swedish Football Association) Djurgårdens IF
2	DF	Kerstin Stegemann	29 September 1977 (aged 30)	178	7	(German Football Association) Wattenscheid 09
3	DF	Saskia Bartusiak	9 September 1982 (aged 25)	13	0	(German Football Association) FFC Frankfurt
4	DF	Babett Peter	12 May 1988 (aged 20)	17	0	(German Football Association) FFC Turbine Potsdam
5	DF	Annike Krahn	1 July 1985 (aged 23)	38	3	(German Football Association) FCR 2001 Duisburg
6	DF	Linda Bresonik	7 December 1983 (aged 24)	39	3	(German Football Association) SG Essen-Schönebeck
7	MF	Melanie Behringer	18 November 1979 (aged 28)	32	9	(German Football Association) SC Freiburg
8	FW	Sandra Smisek	3 July 1977 (aged 31)	126	32	(German Football Association) FFC Frankfurt
9	FW	Birgit Prinz (captain)	25 October 1977 (aged 30)	180	120	(German Football Association) FFC Frankfurt
10	MF	Renate Lingor	11 October 1975 (aged 32)	141	35	(German Football Association) FFC Frankfurt
11	FW	Anja Mittag	16 May 1985 (aged 23)	44	5	(German Football Association) FFC Turbine Potsdam
12	GK	Ursula Holl	26 June 1982 (aged 26)	2	0	(German Football Association) SC 07 Bad Neuenahr
13	MF	Célia Okoyino da Mbabi	29 May 1988 (aged 20)	27	3	(German Football Association) SC 07 Bad Neuenahr
14	MF	Simone Laudehr	12 July 1986 (aged 22)	13	2	(German Football Association) FCR 2001 Duisburg
15	MF	Fatmire Bajramaj	1 April 1988 (aged 20)	15	1	(German Football Association) FCR 2001 Duisburg
16	FW	Conny Pohlers	16 November 1978 (aged 29)	64	28	(German Football Association) FFC Frankfurt
17	DF	Ariane Hingst	25 July 1979 (aged 29)	149	10	(Swedish Football Association) Djurgårdens IF
18	MF	Kerstin Garefrekes	4 September 1979 (aged 28)	89	31	(German Football Association) FFC Frankfurt

Group play

Pos	Team	Pld	W	D	L	GF	GA	GD	Pts	Qualification
1	Brazil	3	2	1	0	5	2	+3	7	Qualified for the quarterfinals
2	Germany	3	2	1	0	2	0	+2	7	Qualified for the quarterfinals
3	North Korea	3	1	0	2	2	3	−1	3	
4	Nigeria	3	0	0	3	1	5	−4	0	

6 August 2008
17:00

Germany	0–0	Brazil
	Report

Shenyang Olympic Stadium, Shenyang
Attendance: 20,703
Referee: Kari Seitz (USA)
9 August 2008
17:00

Nigeria	0–1	Germany
	Report	Stegemann 65'

Shenyang Olympic Stadium, Shenyang
Attendance: 19,266
Referee: Jenny Palmqvist (Sweden)
12 August 2008
17:00

North Korea	0–1	Germany
	Report	Mittag 86'

Tianjin Olympic Center Stadium, Tianjin
Attendance: 12,387
Referee: Dianne Ferreira-James (Guyana)

Quarterfinals

15 August 2008
21:00

Sweden	0–2 (a.e.t.)	Germany
	Report	Garefrekes 104'; Laudehr 115'

Shenyang Olympic Stadium, Shenyang
Attendance: 17,209
Referee: Dagmar Damkova (Czech Republic)

Semifinals

18 August 2008
18:00

Brazil	4–1	Germany
Formiga 43'; Cristiane 49', 76'; Marta 53'	Report	Prinz 10'

Shanghai Stadium, Shanghai
Attendance: 26,976
Referee: Hong Eun-ah (Korea Republic)

Bronze medal game

21 August 2008
18:00

(bronze) Germany	2–0	Japan
Bajramaj 68', 87'	Report

Beijing Workers' Stadium, Beijing
Attendance: 49,285
Referee: Estela Álvarez (Argentina)

Final rank

Bronze

== Gymnastics ==
=== Artistic ===
Men
Team

Athlete	Event	Qualification								Final							
Athlete	Event	Apparatus						Total	Rank	Apparatus						Total	Rank
Athlete	Event	F	PH	R	V	PB	HB	Total	Rank	F	PH	R	V	PB	HB	Total	Rank
Thomas Andergassen	Team	—N/a	14.900	15.525	—N/a	14.675	—N/a			—N/a	15.075	15.550	—N/a				
Philipp Boy	Team	14.450	14.675	14.650	16.200	15.125	14.375	89.475	21 Q	—N/a	14.675	—N/a	14.950	—N/a	15.725	—N/a	
Fabian Hambüchen	Team	15.800 Q	13.100	14.975	16.300	16.050 Q	16.200 Q	92.425	2 Q	15.875	—N/a	15.175	16.175	15.950	15.100	—N/a	
Robert Juckel	Team	14.850	14.850	14.425	15.050	—N/a	14.750	—N/a		—N/a	14.900	14.925	—N/a		14.825	—N/a	
Marcel Nguyen	Team	15.425	—N/a	14.850	16.225	14.875	14.450	—N/a		15.475	—N/a		15.875	14.400	—N/a		
Eugen Spiridonov	Team	15.025	14.475	—N/a	15.650	15.450	14.400	—N/a		14.875	—N/a			15.075	—N/a		
Total	Team	61.100	58.900	60.000	64.375	61.500	59.800	365.675	5 Q	46.225	44.650	45.650	47.000	45.425	45.650	274.600	4

Individual finals

Athlete	Event	Apparatus						Total	Rank
Athlete	Event	F	PH	R	V	PB	HB	Total	Rank
Philipp Boy	All-around	15.075	14.875	14.825	15.400	15.050	15.450	90.675	13
Fabian Hambüchen	All-around	15.625	14.375	15.025	15.975	15.275	15.400	91.675	7
Fabian Hambüchen	Floor	15.650	—N/a					15.650	4
Fabian Hambüchen	Parallel bars	—N/a				15.975	—N/a	15.975	4
Fabian Hambüchen	Horizontal bar	—N/a					15.650	15.650	3rd place, bronze medalist(s)

Women
Team

Athlete	Event	Qualification						Final					
Athlete	Event	Apparatus				Total	Rank	Apparatus				Total	Rank
Athlete	Event	F	V	UB	BB	Total	Rank	F	V	UB	BB	Total	Rank
Katja Abel	Team	13.475	14.250	14.650	14.075	56.450	40	Did not advance					
Daria Bijak	Team	14.475	14.175	14.650	11.150	54.450	51	Did not advance					
Anja Brinker	Team	—N/a		15.125	—N/a			Did not advance					
Oksana Chusovitina	Team	14.450	15.800 Q	14.725	14.400	59.375	14 Q	Did not advance					
Marie-Sophie Hindermann	Team	12.400	14.925	13.125	13.425	53.875	55	Did not advance					
Joeline Möbius	Team	14.275	13.675	—N/a	13.925	—N/a		Did not advance					
Total	Team	56.675	59.150	59.150	55.825	230.800	12	Did not advance					

Individual finals

Athlete	Event	Apparatus				Total	Rank
Athlete	Event	F	V	UB	BB	Total	Rank
Oksana Chusovitina	All-around	14.600	15.750	14.900	14.875	60.125	9
Oksana Chusovitina	Vault	—N/a	15.575	—N/a		15.575	2nd place, silver medalist(s)

=== Trampoline ===
Athlete	Event	Qualification		Final	
Athlete	Event	Score	Rank	Score	Rank
Henrik Stehlik	Men's	64.60	16	Did not advance	
Anna Dogonadze	Women's	64.30	7 Q	18.90	8

== Handball ==
=== Men's tournament ===
Roster

The following is the Germany roster in the men's handball tournament of the 2008 Summer Olympics.

Head coach: Heiner Brand

No.	Pos.	Name	Date of birth (age)	Height	App.	Goals	Club
1	GK	Henning Fritz	21 September 1974 (aged 33)	1.88 m	235		(Germany) Rhein-Neckar Löwen
2	LB	Pascal Hens	26 March 1980 (aged 28)	2.03 m	150	441	(Germany) HSV Hamburg
4	P	Oliver Roggisch	25 August 1978 (aged 29)	2.02 m	94	24	(Germany) Rhein-Neckar Löwen
5	LW	Dominik Klein	16 December 1983 (aged 24)	1.90 m	70	143	(Germany) THW Kiel
8	P	Christian Schwarzer	23 October 1969 (aged 38)	1.96 m	314	957	(Germany) Rhein-Neckar Löwen
10	CB	Oliver Kohrmann	28 July 1976 (aged 32)	1.86 m	12	12	(Germany) Wilhelmshavener HV
11	RB	Holger Glandorf	30 March 1983 (aged 25)	1.95 m	87	283	(Germany) HSG Nordhorn
12	GK	Johannes Bitter	2 September 1982 (aged 25)	2.04 m	94	2	(Germany) HSV Hamburg
13	CB	Sven-Sören Christophersen	9 May 1985 (aged 23)	1.98 m	9	18	(Germany) HSG Wetzlar
14	RB	Christian Zeitz	18 November 1980 (aged 27)	1.85 m	161	456	(Germany) THW Kiel
15	LW	Torsten Jansen	23 December 1976 (aged 31)	1.85 m	143	393	(Germany) HSV Hamburg
17	P	Andrej Klimovets	18 August 1974 (aged 33)	1.96 m	67	167	(Germany) Rhein-Neckar Löwen
18	RB	Michael Kraus	28 September 1983 (aged 24)	1.87 m	65	169	(Germany) TBV Lemgo
19	RW	Florian Kehrmann	26 June 1977 (aged 31)	1.86 m	218	798	(Germany) TBV Lemgo
24	CB	Michael Haaß	12 December 1983 (aged 24)	1.94 m	20	20	(Germany) TSV GWD Minden

Group play

Team	Pld	W	D	L	GF	GA	GD	Pts	Qualification
South Korea	5	3	0	2	122	129	−7	6	Qualified for the quarterfinals
Denmark	5	2	2	1	137	131	+6	6	Qualified for the quarterfinals
Iceland	5	2	2	1	151	146	+5	6	Qualified for the quarterfinals
Russia	5	2	1	2	136	131	+5	5	Qualified for the quarterfinals
Germany	5	2	1	2	126	130	−4	5	
Egypt	5	0	2	3	127	132	−5	2	

10 August 2008; 15:45	Germany	27 – 23	South Korea	Olympic Sports Centre Gymnasium; Referees: Canbro, Claesson (SWE)
10 August 2008; 15:45	Kraus 7	(10–13)	Cho Chi-hyo 7	Olympic Sports Centre Gymnasium; Referees: Canbro, Claesson (SWE)
10 August 2008; 15:45	3× (yellow card) 3× (suspension)	Report	3× (yellow card) 3× (suspension)	Olympic Sports Centre Gymnasium; Referees: Canbro, Claesson (SWE)

12 August 2008; 20:45	Iceland	33 – 29	Germany	Olympic Sports Centre Gymnasium; Referees: Bord, Buy (FRA)
12 August 2008; 20:45	Guðjónsson 8	(17–14)	Kraus 13	Olympic Sports Centre Gymnasium; Referees: Bord, Buy (FRA)
12 August 2008; 20:45	3× (yellow card) 2× (suspension)	Report	2× (yellow card) 5× (suspension) 1× (red card)	Olympic Sports Centre Gymnasium; Referees: Bord, Buy (FRA)

14 August 2008; 09:00	Germany	25 – 23	Egypt	Olympic Sports Centre Gymnasium; Referees: Krstic, Ljubic (SLO)
14 August 2008; 09:00	Glandorf 7	(14–14)	Zaky 7	Olympic Sports Centre Gymnasium; Referees: Krstic, Ljubic (SLO)
14 August 2008; 09:00	3× (yellow card) 5× (suspension)	Report	4× (yellow card) 8× (suspension)	Olympic Sports Centre Gymnasium; Referees: Krstic, Ljubic (SLO)

16 August 2008; 15:45	Russia	24 – 24	Germany	Olympic Sports Centre Gymnasium; Referees: Gjeding, Hansen (DEN)
16 August 2008; 15:45	Filippov 6	(11–10)	Kraus 6	Olympic Sports Centre Gymnasium; Referees: Gjeding, Hansen (DEN)
16 August 2008; 15:45	1× (yellow card) 6× (suspension) 1× (red card)	Report	4× (yellow card) 3× (suspension)	Olympic Sports Centre Gymnasium; Referees: Gjeding, Hansen (DEN)

18 August 2008; 19:00	Germany	21 – 27	Denmark	Olympic Sports Centre Gymnasium; Referees: Krstic, Ljubic (SLO)
18 August 2008; 19:00	Kraus 6	(12–15)	Boesen 8	Olympic Sports Centre Gymnasium; Referees: Krstic, Ljubic (SLO)
18 August 2008; 19:00	4× (yellow card) 4× (suspension) 1× (red card)	Report	3× (yellow card) 6× (suspension)	Olympic Sports Centre Gymnasium; Referees: Krstic, Ljubic (SLO)

=== Women's tournament ===
Roster

The following is the Germany roster in the women's handball tournament of the 2008 Summer Olympics.

Head coach: Armin Emrich

No.	Pos.	Name	Date of birth (age)	Height	App.	Goals	Club
1	GK	Sabine Englert	27 November 1981 (aged 26)	1.84 m	139	2	(Austria) Hypo Niederösterreich
2	LW	Nadine Härdter	29 March 1981 (aged 27)	1.66 m	125	199	(Germany) Thüringer HC
4	RB	Grit Jurack	22 October 1977 (aged 30)	1.86 m	261	1377	(Denmark) Viborg HK
7	CB	Nina Wörz	14 November 1980 (aged 27)	1.79 m	134	252	(Denmark) Randers HK
8	RB	Anne Müller	5 July 1983 (aged 25)	1.76 m	84	119	(Germany) TSV Bayer 04 Leverkusen
9	LB	Laura Steinbach	2 August 1985 (aged 23)	1.80 m	9	16	(Germany) TSV Bayer 04 Leverkusen
10	CB	Anna Loerper	18 November 1984 (aged 23)	1.62 m	78	93	(Germany) TSV Bayer 04 Leverkusen
11	LW	Mandy Hering	11 March 1984 (aged 24)	1.70 m	42	80	(Germany) Frankfurter HC
13	LB	Nadine Krause	25 March 1982 (aged 26)	1.78 m	145	569	(Denmark) FCK Handball
15	RW	Sabrina Neukamp	10 May 1982 (aged 26)	1.73 m	70	101	(Germany) HSG Blomberg-Lippe
16	GK	Clara Woltering	2 May 1983 (aged 25)	1.75 m	83		(Germany) TSV Bayer 04 Leverkusen
18	CB	Maren Baumbach	14 January 1981 (aged 27)	1.70 m	115	333	(Denmark) FCK Handball
19	RB	Stefanie Melbeck	16 April 1977 (aged 31)	1.74 m	178	388	(Denmark) KIF Kolding
20	P	Anja Althaus	3 September 1982 (aged 25)	1.74 m	125	254	(Denmark) Viborg HK

Group play

Team	Pld	W	D	L	GF	GA	GD	Pts	Qualification
Russia	5	4	1	0	148	125	+23	9	Qualified for the quarterfinals
South Korea	5	3	1	1	155	127	+28	7	Qualified for the quarterfinals
Hungary	5	2	1	2	129	142	−13	5	Qualified for the quarterfinals
Sweden	5	2	0	3	123	137	−14	4	Qualified for the quarterfinals
Brazil	5	1	1	3	124	137	−13	3	
Germany	5	1	0	4	123	134	−11	2	

9 August 2008; 20:45	Germany	24 – 22	Brazil	Olympic Sports Centre Gymnasium; Referees: Breto, Huelin (ESP)
9 August 2008; 20:45	Krause 6	(11–12)	Santos 6	Olympic Sports Centre Gymnasium; Referees: Breto, Huelin (ESP)
9 August 2008; 20:45	3× (yellow card) 2× (suspension)	Report	3× (yellow card) 2× (suspension)	Olympic Sports Centre Gymnasium; Referees: Breto, Huelin (ESP)

11 August 2008; 15:45	South Korea	30 – 20	Germany	Olympic Sports Centre Gymnasium; Referees: Krstic, Ljubic (SLO)
11 August 2008; 15:45	Hong Jeong-ho 6	(12–9)	Jurack, Loerper 4	Olympic Sports Centre Gymnasium; Referees: Krstic, Ljubic (SLO)
11 August 2008; 15:45	3× (yellow card) 6× (suspension)	Report	3× (yellow card) 3× (suspension)	Olympic Sports Centre Gymnasium; Referees: Krstic, Ljubic (SLO)

13 August 2008; 20:45	Germany	24 – 25	Hungary	Olympic Sports Centre Gymnasium; Referees: Gjeding, Hansen (DEN)
13 August 2008; 20:45	Krause 9	(14–12)	Görbicz 9	Olympic Sports Centre Gymnasium; Referees: Gjeding, Hansen (DEN)
13 August 2008; 20:45	3× (yellow card) 4× (suspension)	Report	4× (yellow card) 7× (suspension)	Olympic Sports Centre Gymnasium; Referees: Gjeding, Hansen (DEN)

15 August 2008; 14:00	Germany	26 – 27	Sweden	Olympic Sports Centre Gymnasium; Referees: Bord, Buy (FRA)
15 August 2008; 14:00	Althaus, Wörz 5	(13–13)	Ahlm 7	Olympic Sports Centre Gymnasium; Referees: Bord, Buy (FRA)
15 August 2008; 14:00	2× (yellow card) 4× (suspension) 1× (red card)	Report	4× (yellow card) 4× (suspension)	Olympic Sports Centre Gymnasium; Referees: Bord, Buy (FRA)

17 August 2008; 19:00	Russia	30 – 29	Germany	Olympic Sports Centre Gymnasium; Referees: Gjeding, Hansen (DEN)
17 August 2008; 19:00	Postnova 8	(16–14)	Wörz 8	Olympic Sports Centre Gymnasium; Referees: Gjeding, Hansen (DEN)
17 August 2008; 19:00	2× (yellow card) 4× (suspension)	Report	3× (yellow card) 3× (suspension)	Olympic Sports Centre Gymnasium; Referees: Gjeding, Hansen (DEN)

== Judo ==
Men

Athlete	Event	Preliminary	Round of 32	Round of 16	Quarterfinals	Semifinals	Repechage 1	Repechage 2	Repechage 3	Final / BM	
Athlete	Event	Opposition Result	Opposition Result	Opposition Result	Opposition Result	Opposition Result	Opposition Result	Opposition Result	Opposition Result	Opposition Result	Rank
Ole Bischof	−81 kg	Bye	Azizov (AZE); W 0020–0011	Stevens (USA); W 0011–0001	Camilo (BRA); W 0200–0000	Gontiuk (UKR); W 0011–0001	Bye			Kim J (KOR); W 0010–0000	1st place, gold medalist(s)
Michael Pinske	−90 kg	—N/a	Aschwanden (SUI); L 0000–0010	Did not advance							
Benjamin Behrla	−100 kg	—N/a	Gasymov (RUS); W 1100–0001	Naidangiin (MGL); L 0001–0021	Did not advance		Suzuki (JPN); W 1000–0000	Jang (KOR); L 0000–1000	Did not advance		
Andreas Tölzer	+100 kg	Bye	Tangriev (UZB); L 0000–0211	Did not advance			Wojnarowicz (POL); W 0100–0010	Riner (FRA); L 0010–0020	Did not advance		

Women

Athlete	Event	Round of 32	Round of 16	Quarterfinals	Semifinals	Repechage 1	Repechage 2	Repechage 3	Final / BM	
Athlete	Event	Opposition Result	Opposition Result	Opposition Result	Opposition Result	Opposition Result	Opposition Result	Opposition Result	Opposition Result	Rank
Michaela Baschin	−48 kg	Bye	Moussa (ALG); W 0101–0000	Bermoy (CUB); L 0000–0001	Did not advance	Bye	Bogdanova (RUS); L 0000–0001	Did not advance		
Romy Tarangul	−52 kg	Djuraeva (UZB); W 1101–0000	Nakamura (JPN); L 0000–0001	Did not advance		Bye	Heylen (BEL); L 0000–0002	Did not advance		
Yvonne Bönisch	−57 kg	Quintavalle (ITA); L 0001–0101	Did not advance			Khishigbat (MGL); W 0110–0001	Harel (FRA); L 0000–0001	Did not advance		
Anna von Harnier	−63 kg	A'etonu (ASA); W 1000–0000	Battögs (MGL); W 1001–0000	Décosse (FRA); L 0001 - 1001	Did not advance	Bye	Žolnir (SLO); L 0000–0200	Did not advance		
Annett Böhm	−70 kg	Mendy (SEN); W 1000–0000	Smal (UKR); W 1001–0010	Iglesias (ESP); W 1000–0000	Hernández (CUB); L 0010–1000	Bye			Rousey (USA); L 0001–0010	5
Heide Wollert	−78 kg	Pryshchepa (UKR); W 0011–0010	Yusuf (NGR); W 1000–0000	Jeong (KOR); L 0000–1002	Did not advance	Bye	Rogers (GBR); W 0010–0001	Possamaï (FRA); L 0000–0200	Did not advance	
Sandra Köppen	+78 kg	Bye	Shepherd (AUS); L 0000–0110	Did not advance						

== Modern pentathlon ==
Athlete	Event	Shooting (10 m air pistol)			Fencing (épée one touch)			Swimming (200 m freestyle)			Riding (show jumping)			Running (3000 m)			Total points	Final rank
Athlete	Event	Points	Rank	MP Points	Results	Rank	MP points	Time	Rank	MP points	Penalties	Rank	MP points	Time	Rank	MP Points	Total points	Final rank
Steffen Gebhardt	Men's	183	15	1132	18–17	13	832	2:06.84	19	1280	72	5	1128	9:33.97	19	1108	5480	5
Eric Walther	Men's	172	30	1000	20–15	7	880	2:00.84	3	1352	308	26	892	9:18.55	5	1168	5292	16
Lena Schöneborn	Women's	177	20	1060	28–7	1	1072	2:16.91	10	1280	28	4	1172	10:28.82	9	1208	5792	1st place, gold medalist(s)
Eva Trautmann	Women's	168	33	952	9–26	34	616	2:17.17	=13	1376	176	28	1024	10:40.25	13	1160	5082	29

== Rowing ==
Men

Athlete	Event	Heats		Repechage		Quarterfinals		Semifinals		Final	
Athlete	Event	Time	Rank	Time	Rank	Time	Rank	Time	Rank	Time	Rank
Marcel Hacker	Single sculls	7:26.71	2 QF	—N/a		6:48.85	1 SA/B	7:03.05	4 FB	7:07.82	7
Felix Drahotta; Tom Lehmann	Pair	6:48.60	3 SA/B	Bye		—N/a		6:37.26	3 FA	6:47.40	4
Karsten Brodowski; Clemens Wenzel	Double sculls	6:29.60	3 SA/B	Bye		—N/a		6:28.46	6 FB	6:37.97	9
Manuel Brehmer; Jonathan Koch	Lightweight double sculls	6:21.99	3 R	6:41.48	1 SA/B	—N/a		6:37.07	4 FB	6:28.66	9
Filip Adamski; Gregor Hauffe; Urs Käufer; Toni Seifert	Four	6:00:95	2 SA/B	Bye		—N/a		5:58.72	3 FA	6:19.63	6
René Bertram; Hans Gruhne; Stephan Krüger; Christian Schreiber	Quadruple sculls	5:43.48	2 SA/B	Bye		—N/a		5:53.56	3 FA	5:50.96	6
Jochen Kühner; Martin Kühner; Jost Schömann-Finck; Bastian Seibt	Lightweight four	5:50.16	1 SA/B	Bye		—N/a		DNS		Did not advance	
Florian Eichner; Matthias Flach; Florian Mennigen; Philipp Naruhn; Andreas Penkner; Sebastian Schmidt; Peter Thiede (cox); Jochen Urban; Kristof Wilke	Eight	5:37.56	4 R	5:47.05	6 FB	—N/a				5:36.89	8

Women

Athlete	Event	Heats		Repechage		Semifinals		Final	
Athlete	Event	Time	Rank	Time	Rank	Time	Rank	Time	Rank
Maren Derlien; Lenka Wech	Pair	7:28.66	2 R	7:27.02	2 FA	—N/a		7:25.73	4
Christiane Huth; Annekatrin Thiele	Double sculls	7:09.06	2 R	6:55.96	2 FA	—N/a		7:07.33	2nd place, silver medalist(s)
Berit Carow; Marie-Louise Dräger	Lightweight double sculls	6:51.96	1 SA/B	Bye		7:04.95	3 FA	6:56.72	4
Britta Oppelt; Manuela Lutze; Kathrin Boron; Stephanie Schiller	Quadruple sculls	6:15.26	2 R	6:36.17	1 FA	—N/a		6:19.56	3rd place, bronze medalist(s)
Christina Hennings; Elke Hipler; Kerstin Naumann; Katrin Reinert; Annina Ruppel (cox); Nadine Schmutzler; Lenka Wech; Nina Wengert; Nicole Zimmermann	Eight	6:14.42	4 R	6:14.45	5	—N/a		Did not advance	7

Qualification Legend: FA=Final A (medal); FB=Final B (non-medal); FC=Final C (non-medal); FD=Final D (non-medal); FE=Final E (non-medal); FF=Final F (non-medal); SA/B=Semifinals A/B; SC/D=Semifinals C/D; SE/F=Semifinals E/F; QF=Quarterfinals; R=Repechage

== Sailing ==
Men

Athlete	Event	Race											Net points	Final rank
Athlete	Event	1	2	3	4	5	6	7	8	9	10	M*	Net points	Final rank
Ingo Borkowski; Marc Pickel	Star	2	~~14~~	1	8	3	8	14	10	6	10	8	70	7

Women

Athlete	Event	Race											Net points	Final rank
Athlete	Event	1	2	3	4	5	6	7	8	9	10	M*	Net points	Final rank
Petra Niemann	Laser Radial	20	20	19	8	~~BFD~~	7	4	17	14	CAN	EL	109	15
Vivien Kussatz; Stefanie Rothweiler	470	7	6	11	9	5	12	~~OCS~~	8	8	12	12	90	9
Julia Bleck; Ute Höpfner; Ulrike Schümann	Yngling	8	7	7	11	11	3	5	~~13~~	CAN	CAN	4	56	4

Open

Athlete	Event	Race																Net points	Final rank
Athlete	Event	1	2	3	4	5	6	7	8	9	10	11	12	13	14	15	M*	Net points	Final rank
Hannes Peckolt; Jan-Peter Peckolt	49er	~~16~~	6	11	6	3	2	2	12	4	5	4	7	CAN	CAN	CAN	4	66	3rd place, bronze medalist(s)
Johannes Polgar; Florian Spalteholz	Tornado	10	7	11	5	6	1	5	~~13~~	4	3	—N/a					DNF	74	8

M = Medal race; EL = Eliminated – did not advance into the medal race; CAN = Race cancelled

== Shooting ==
Men

Athlete	Event	Qualification		Final	
Athlete	Event	Points	Rank	Points	Rank
Karsten Bindrich	Trap	119	7	Did not advance	
Maik Eckhardt	50 m rifle prone	592	24	Did not advance	
Maik Eckhardt	50 m rifle 3 positions	398	11	Did not advance	
Hans-Jörg Meyer	10 m air pistol	577	21	Did not advance	
Hans-Jörg Meyer	50 m pistol	557	13	Did not advance	
Tino Mohaupt	10 m air rifle	593	25	Did not advance	
Christian Reitz	25 m rapid fire pistol	579	6 Q	779.3	3rd place, bronze medalist(s)
Stefan Rüttgeroth	Trap	113	24	Did not advance	
Florian Schmidt	10 m air pistol	571	38	Did not advance	
Florian Schmidt	50 m pistol	549	29	Did not advance	
Ralf Schumann	25 m rapid fire pistol	579	5 Q	779.5	2nd place, silver medalist(s)
Axel Wegner	Skeet	115	20	Did not advance	
Tino Wenzel	Skeet	117	13	Did not advance	
Michael Winter	10 m air rifle	588	36	Did not advance	
Michael Winter	50 m rifle prone	590	31	Did not advance	
Michael Winter	50 m rifle 3 positions	1166	17	Did not advance	

Women

Athlete	Event	Qualification		Final	
Athlete	Event	Points	Rank	Points	Rank
Christine Brinker	Skeet	70	4 Q	93	3rd place, bronze medalist(s)
Munkhbayar Dorjsuren	10 m air pistol	379	24	Did not advance	
Munkhbayar Dorjsuren	25 m pistol	587	2 Q	789.2	3rd place, bronze medalist(s)
Susanne Kiermayer	Trap	65	8	Did not advance	
Barbara Lechner	10 m air rifle	394	17	Did not advance	
Barbara Lechner	50 m rifle 3 positions	582	9	Did not advance	
Sonja Pfeilschifter	10 m air rifle	396	12	Did not advance	
Sonja Pfeilschifter	50 m rifle 3 positions	578	17	Did not advance	
Stefanie Thurmann	25 m pistol	576	23	Did not advance	
Claudia Verdicchio	10 m air pistol	383	10	Did not advance	

== Swimming ==
Men

Athlete	Event	Heat		Semifinal		Final	
Athlete	Event	Time	Rank	Time	Rank	Time	Rank
Paul Biedermann	200 m freestyle	1:47.09	10 Q	1:46.41	5 Q	1:46.00	5
Paul Biedermann	400 m freestyle	3:48.03	18	—N/a		Did not advance	
Markus Deibler	200 m individual medley	2:04.54	40	Did not advance			
Steffen Deibler	50 m freestyle	22.67	22	Did not advance			
Steffen Deibler	100 m freestyle	49.39	33	Did not advance			
Rafed El-Masri	50 m freestyle	21.96	10 Q	22.09	14	Did not advance	
Christian Kubusch	400 m freestyle	3:52.73	29	—N/a		Did not advance	
Thomas Lurz	10 km open water	—N/a				1:51:53.6	3rd place, bronze medalist(s)
Helge Meeuw	100 m backstroke	54.88	19	Did not advance			
Helge Meeuw	200 m backstroke	1:58.42	11 Q	1:56.85	8	Did not advance	
Thomas Rupprath	100 m backstroke	55.77	33	Did not advance			
Thomas Rupprath	100 m butterfly	53.56	44	Did not advance			
Benjamin Starke	100 m butterfly	53.50	41	Did not advance			
Paul Biedermann; Steffen Deibler; Jens Schreiber; Benjamin Starke	4 × 100 m freestyle relay	3:17.99	15	—N/a		Did not advance	
Paul Biedermann; Stefan Herbst; Christian Kubusch; Benjamin Starke	4 × 200 m freestyle relay	7:13.92	12	—N/a		Did not advance	

Women

Athlete	Event	Heat		Semifinal		Final	
Athlete	Event	Time	Rank	Time	Rank	Time	Rank
Antje Buschschulte	100 m backstroke	1:00.48	11 Q	1:01.15	15	Did not advance	
Petra Dallmann	50 m freestyle	25.43	25	Did not advance			
Petra Dallmann	100 m freestyle	54.70	16 Q	55.05	13	Did not advance	
Petra Dallmann	200 m freestyle	2:00.21	24	Did not advance			
Jaana Ehmcke	400 m freestyle	4:15.15	25	—N/a		Did not advance	
Jaana Ehmcke	800 m freestyle	8:39.51	25	—N/a		Did not advance	
Annika Lurz	200 m freestyle	1:59.98	22	Did not advance			
Angela Maurer	10 km open water	—N/a				1:59:31.9	4
Sarah Poewe	100 m breaststroke	1:08.69	20	Did not advance			
Anne Poleska	200 m breaststroke	2:26.74	14 Q	2:26.71	10	Did not advance	
Daniela Samulski	100 m butterfly	1:00.37	39	Did not advance			
Katharina Schiller	200 m individual medley	2:18.00	30	Did not advance			
Katharina Schiller	400 m individual medley	4:51.52	33	—N/a		Did not advance	
Sonja Schöber	100 m breaststroke	1:11.36	36	Did not advance			
Sonja Schöber	200 m individual medley	2:20.18	34	Did not advance			
Britta Steffen	50 m freestyle	24.90	6 Q	24.43	3 Q	24.06 OR	1st place, gold medalist(s)
Britta Steffen	100 m freestyle	53.67	2 Q	53.96	6 Q	53.12 OR	1st place, gold medalist(s)
Christin Zenner	100 m backstroke	1:03.87	42	Did not advance			
Christin Zenner	200 m backstroke	2:20.28	34	Did not advance			
Antje Buschschulte; Meike Freitag; Daniela Götz; Britta Steffen	4 × 100 m freestyle relay	3:37.52	2 Q	—N/a		3:36.85	5
Petra Dallmann; Meike Freitag; Annika Lurz; Daniela Samulski	4 × 200 m freestyle relay	7:58.11	12	—N/a		Did not advance	
Antje Buschschulte; Sarah Poewe; Daniela Samulski; Britta Steffen	4 × 100 m medley relay	4:02.53	9	—N/a		Did not advance	

== Table tennis ==
Singles

Athlete	Event	Preliminary round	Round 1	Round 2	Round 3	Round 4	Quarterfinals	Semifinals	Final / BM	
Athlete	Event	Opposition Result	Opposition Result	Opposition Result	Opposition Result	Opposition Result	Opposition Result	Opposition Result	Opposition Result	Rank
Timo Boll	Men's singles	Bye			Kim H-B (PRK); W 4–1	Oh S-E (KOR); L 1–4	Did not advance			
Dimitrij Ovtcharov	Men's singles	Bye			Criṣan (ROU); W 4–3	Ko L C (HKG); L 1–4	Did not advance			
Christian Süß	Men's singles	Bye		Jakab (HUN); W 4–1	Samsonov (BLR); L 0–4	Did not advance				
Elke Schall	Women's singles	Bye		Hu (TUR); L 2–4	Did not advance					
Wu Jiaduo	Women's singles	Bye			Li Qb (AUT); L 3–4	Did not advance				

Team

Athlete	Event	Group round		Semifinals	Bronze playoff 1	Bronze playoff 2	Bronze medal	Final	
Athlete	Event	Opposition Result	Rank	Opposition Result	Opposition Result	Opposition Result	Opposition Result	Opposition Result	Rank
Timo Boll; Dimitrij Ovtcharov; Christian Süß	Men's team	Group B Croatia; W 3 – 0 Singapore; W 3 – 1 Canada; W 3 – 0	1 Q	Japan; W 3 – 2	Bye			China; L 0 – 3	2nd place, silver medalist(s)
Zhenqi Barthel; Elke Schall; Wu Jiaduo	Women's team	Group C Hong Kong; L 0 – 3 Romania; L 0 – 3 Poland; L 1 – 3	4	Did not advance					

== Taekwondo ==
Athlete	Event	Round of 16	Quarterfinals	Semifinals	Repechage	Bronze Medal	Final	
Athlete	Event	Opposition Result	Opposition Result	Opposition Result	Opposition Result	Opposition Result	Opposition Result	Rank
Levent Tuncat	Men's −58 kg	Nikpai (AFG); L 3–4	Did not advance					
Daniel Manz	Men's −68 kg	Abduraim (KGZ); W 1–0	M López (USA); L 1–3	Did not advance	Bahave (AFG); W 4–3	Sung Y-C (TPE); L 3–4	Did not advance	5
Sümeyye Gülec	Women's −49 kg	Contreras (VEN); L 2–4	Did not advance					
Helena Fromm	Women's −67 kg	Barry (GUI); W 6–1	Ocasio (PUR); L 0–2	Did not advance				

== Tennis ==
Athlete	Event	Round of 64	Round of 32	Round of 16	Quarterfinals	Semifinals	Final / BM	
Athlete	Event	Opposition Score	Opposition Score	Opposition Score	Opposition Score	Opposition Score	Opposition Score	Rank
Nicolas Kiefer	Men's singles	Mirnyi (BLR); W 6–3, 6–1	Anderson (RSA); W 6–4, 6–7^{(4–7)}, 6–4	Mathieu (FRA); L 3–6, 5–7	Did not advance			
Rainer Schüttler	Men's singles	Nishikori (JPN); W 6–4, 5–7, 6–3	Djokovic (SRB); L 4–6, 2–6	Did not advance				
Nicolas Kiefer; Rainer Schüttler	Men's doubles	—N/a	Knowle / Melzer (AUT); L 7–6^{(7–3)}, 3–6, 1–6	Did not advance				

== Triathlon ==
Athlete	Event	Swim (1.5 km)	Trans 1	Bike (40 km)	Trans 2	Run (10 km)	Total Time	Rank
Jan Frodeno	Men's	18:14	0:26	59:01	0:26	30:46	1:48:53.28	1st place, gold medalist(s)
Christian Prochnow	Men's	18:23	0:26	58:56	0:27	58:56	1:50:33.90	15
Daniel Unger	Men's	18:25	0:27	58:49	0:27	31:35	1:49:43.78	6
Anja Dittmer	Women's	20:16	0:30	1:06:08	0:33	38:18	2:05:45.86	33
Ricarda Lisk	Women's	20:00	0:30	1:04:12	0:39	36:46	2:02:07.75	15
Christiane Pilz	Women's	20:00	0:33	1:04:09	0:35	38:29	2:03:46.82	26

== Volleyball ==
=== Beach ===
Athlete	Event	Preliminary round	Standing	Round of 16	Quarterfinals	Semifinals	Final / BM	
Athlete	Event	Opposition Score	Standing	Opposition Score	Opposition Score	Opposition Score	Opposition Score	Rank
Julius Brink; Christoph Dieckmann	Men's	Pool F Asahi – Shiratori (JPN); W 2 – 0 (21–18, 21–18); Gibb – Rosenthal (USA); L 0 – 2 (15–21, 13–21); Boersma – Ronnes (NED); L 0 – 2 (16–21, 20–22)	4	Did not advance				
David Klemperer; Eric Koreng	Men's	Pool E Kjemperud – Skarlund (NOR); W 2 – 1 (19–21, 22–20, 15–7) Laciga – Schnider (SUI); L 0 – 2 (15–21, 15–21); Nummerdor – Schuil (NED); L 0 – 2 (16–21, 16–21); Lucky Losers; Boersma – Ronnes (NED); W 2 – 0 (21–16, 27–25)	3 Q	Wu – Xu (CHN); W 2 – 0 (21–15, 21–18)	Dalhausser – Rogers (USA); L 0 – 2 (13–21, 23–25)	Did not advance		
Sara Goller; Laura Ludwig	Women's	Pool D Augoustides – Nel (RSA); W 2 – 0 (21–12, 21–14); Xue – Zhang (CHN); L 0 – 2 (14–21, 18–21); Koutroumanidou – Tsiartsiani (GRE); W 2 – 0 (24–22, 21–12)	2 Q	D Schwaiger – S Schwaiger (AUT); L 1 – 2 (21–23, 21–11, 16–18)	Did not advance			
Stephanie Pohl; Okka Rau	Women's	Pool E Crespo – Esteves (CUB); W 2 – 0 (21–17, 21–19); Branagh – Youngs (USA); L 0 – 2 (17–21, 16–21); Kadijk – Mooren (NED); W 2 – 0 (21–19, 21–18)	2 Q	Ana Paula – Larissa (BRA); L 0 – 2 (18–21, 14–21)	Did not advance			

=== Indoor ===
Germany entered a team in the men's tournament. The team lost all games but one in the group play, and did not advance, finishing tied for 9th place.

==== Men's tournament ====
Roster

The following is the German roster in the men's volleyball tournament of the 2008 Summer Olympics.

Head Coach: (Romania) Stelian Moculescu

No.	Name	Date of birth	Height	Weight	Spike	Block	2008 club
1	Marcus Popp	23 September 1981	1.92 m (6 ft 4 in)	90 kg (200 lb)	358 cm (141 in)	338 cm (133 in)	(Italy) Marmi Lanza Verona
4	Simon Tischer	24 April 1982	1.94 m (6 ft 4 in)	88 kg (194 lb)	346 cm (136 in)	328 cm (129 in)	(Greece) Iraklis
5	Björn Andrae (c)	14 May 1981	2.00 m (6 ft 7 in)	92 kg (203 lb)	350 cm (140 in)	330 cm (130 in)	(Poland) AZS Olsztyn
7	Mark Siebeck	14 October 1975	1.96 m (6 ft 5 in)	92 kg (203 lb)	345 cm (136 in)	320 cm (130 in)	(Turkey) Halkbank Ankara
8	Marcus Böhme	25 August 1985	2.11 m (6 ft 11 in)	111 kg (245 lb)	345 cm (136 in)	321 cm (126 in)	(Germany) SCC Berlin
9	Stefan Hübner	13 June 1975	2.00 m (6 ft 7 in)	99 kg (218 lb)	365 cm (144 in)	345 cm (136 in)	(Italy) Sisley Treviso
10	Jochen Schöps	8 October 1983	2.00 m (6 ft 7 in)	100 kg (220 lb)	360 cm (140 in)	335 cm (132 in)	(Russia) Iskra Odintsovo
11	Frank Dehne	14 February 1976	2.02 m (6 ft 8 in)	100 kg (220 lb)	340 cm (130 in)	320 cm (130 in)	(Italy) Marmi Lanza Verona
12	Christian Pampel	6 September 1979	1.98 m (6 ft 6 in)	92 kg (203 lb)	360 cm (140 in)	340 cm (130 in)	(Russia) Gazprom-Jugra Surgut
13	Ralph Bergmann	26 May 1970	2.06 m (6 ft 9 in)	95 kg (209 lb)	350 cm (140 in)	327 cm (129 in)	(Germany) Moerser SC
14	Robert Kromm	9 March 1984	2.12 m (6 ft 11 in)	100 kg (220 lb)	360 cm (140 in)	345 cm (136 in)	(Italy) Sempre Volley
19	Thomas Kröger (L)	11 June 1979	1.90 m (6 ft 3 in)	82 kg (181 lb)	328 cm (129 in)	302 cm (119 in)	(Germany) VfB Friedrichshafen

Group play

Pos	Team	Pld	W	L	Pts	SPW	SPL	SPR	SW	SL	SR	Qualification
1	Brazil	5	4	1	9	427	373	1.145	13	4	3.250	Quarterfinals
2	Russia	5	4	1	9	496	447	1.110	14	7	2.000	Quarterfinals
3	Poland	5	4	1	9	434	404	1.074	12	6	2.000	Quarterfinals
4	Serbia	5	2	3	7	440	439	1.002	9	10	0.900	Quarterfinals
5	Germany	5	1	4	6	418	440	0.950	6	12	0.500	
6	Egypt	5	0	5	5	267	379	0.704	0	15	0.000	

10 August 2008; 22:20	Poland	3–0	Germany	Capital Indoor Stadium, Beijing; Attendance: 5,700; Referees: Frans Loderus (NED), Massimo Menghini (ITA)
10 August 2008; 22:20	(25–17, 33–31, 25–20) result statistics			Capital Indoor Stadium, Beijing; Attendance: 5,700; Referees: Frans Loderus (NED), Massimo Menghini (ITA)

12 August 2008; 10:00	Russia	3–2	Germany	Beijing Institute of Technology Gymnasium, Beijing; Attendance: 3,500; Referees: Patrick Deregnaucourt (FRA), Bela Hobor (HUN)
12 August 2008; 10:00	(25–27, 25–21, 21–25, 25–23, 16–14) result statistics			Beijing Institute of Technology Gymnasium, Beijing; Attendance: 3,500; Referees: Patrick Deregnaucourt (FRA), Bela Hobor (HUN)

14 August 2008; 12:00	Germany	3–0	Egypt	Beijing Institute of Technology Gymnasium, Beijing; Attendance: 3,200; Referees: Ibrahim Al-Naama (QAT), Jiang Liu (CHN)
14 August 2008; 12:00	(29–27, 25–21, 25–21) result statistics			Beijing Institute of Technology Gymnasium, Beijing; Attendance: 3,200; Referees: Ibrahim Al-Naama (QAT), Jiang Liu (CHN)

16 August 2008; 12:30	Serbia	3–1	Germany	Capital Indoor Stadium, Beijing; Attendance: 12,500; Referees: Ning Wang (CHN), Bela Hobor (HUN)
16 August 2008; 12:30	(25–21, 27–25, 24–26, 25–23) result statistics			Capital Indoor Stadium, Beijing; Attendance: 12,500; Referees: Ning Wang (CHN), Bela Hobor (HUN)

18 August 2008; 12:20	Germany	0–3	Brazil	Beijing Institute of Technology Gymnasium, Beijing; Attendance: 3,400; Referees: Jiang Liu (CHN), Umit Sokullu (TUR)
18 August 2008; 12:20	(22–25, 21–25, 23–25) result statistics			Beijing Institute of Technology Gymnasium, Beijing; Attendance: 3,400; Referees: Jiang Liu (CHN), Umit Sokullu (TUR)

== Water polo ==
Germany participated in the men's tournament, where the team finished in 10th place.

=== Men's tournament ===
Roster

The following is the German roster in the men's water polo tournament of the 2008 Summer Olympics.

№	Name	Pos.	Height	Weight	Date of birth	Club
1	Alexander Tchigir	GK	1.91 m (6 ft 3 in)	82 kg (181 lb)	6 November 1968	(Germany) Wasserfreunde Spandau 04
2	Florian Naroska	CB	1.98 m (6 ft 6 in)	102 kg (225 lb)	16 April 1982	(Germany) SSV Esslingen
3	Julian Real	CB	1.98 m (6 ft 6 in)	100 kg (220 lb)	22 December 1989	(Germany) Amateur SC Duisburg
4	Marko Savić	D	1.75 m (5 ft 9 in)	85 kg (187 lb)	11 January 1981	(Germany) Wasserfreunde Spandau 04
5	Marko Stamm	CB	1.85 m (6 ft 1 in)	90 kg (200 lb)	30 August 1988	(Germany) Wasserfreunde Spandau 04
6	Marc Politze	CF	1.96 m (6 ft 5 in)	100 kg (220 lb)	20 October 1977	(Germany) Wasserfreunde Spandau 04
7	Heiko Nossek	D	1.88 m (6 ft 2 in)	99 kg (218 lb)	14 March 1982	(Germany) SSV Esslingen
8	Thomas Schertwitis	CF	1.98 m (6 ft 6 in)	115 kg (254 lb)	2 September 1972	(Russia) Sintez Kazan
9	Tobias Kreuzmann	D	1.95 m (6 ft 5 in)	90 kg (200 lb)	15 June 1981	(Germany) Amateur SC Duisburg
10	Moritz Oeler	D	1.88 m (6 ft 2 in)	81 kg (179 lb)	21 October 1985	(Germany) Wasserfreunde Spandau 04
11	Andreas Schlotterbeck	CF	1.90 m (6 ft 3 in)	108 kg (238 lb)	2 March 1982	(Germany) Wasserfreunde Spandau 04
12	Sören Mackeben	D	1.83 m (6 ft 0 in)	85 kg (187 lb)	29 January 1979	(Germany) Wasserfreunde Spandau 04
13	Michael Zellmer	GK	1.90 m (6 ft 3 in)	95 kg (209 lb)	14 August 1977	(Germany) Waspo Hannover

Head coach: Hagen Stamm

Group play

Team	Pld	W	D	L	GF	GA	GD	Pts	Qualification
United States	5	4	0	1	37	31	+6	8	Qualified for the semifinals
Croatia	5	4	0	1	56	31	+25	8	Qualified for the quarterfinals
Serbia	5	3	0	2	50	38	+12	6	Qualified for the quarterfinals
Germany	5	2	0	3	33	44	−11	4	Will play for places 7–10
Italy	5	2	0	3	57	50	+7	4	Will play for places 7–12
China	5	0	0	5	25	64	−39	0	Will play for places 7–12

All times are China Standard Time (UTC+8).

10 August 2008; 12:10	Report	Serbia	11–7	Germany	Ying Tung Natatorium, Beijing; Referees: Tulga (TUR), Littlejohn (GBR)
10 August 2008; 12:10	Report	Score by quarters: 1–3, 5–2, 2–2, 3–0			Ying Tung Natatorium, Beijing; Referees: Tulga (TUR), Littlejohn (GBR)
10 August 2008; 12:10	Report	Pijetlović 4, Udovičić 2, Šapić 2	Goals	Politze 2, Mackeben 2	Ying Tung Natatorium, Beijing; Referees: Tulga (TUR), Littlejohn (GBR)

12 August 2008; 16:40	Report	Germany	6–5	China	Ying Tung Natatorium, Beijing; Referees: Moliner Molins (ESP), Hart (AUS)
12 August 2008; 16:40	Report	Score by quarters: 0–2, 5–2, 0–0, 1–1			Ying Tung Natatorium, Beijing; Referees: Moliner Molins (ESP), Hart (AUS)
12 August 2008; 16:40	Report	Savić 2, Schertwitis 2	Goals	Yu 2	Ying Tung Natatorium, Beijing; Referees: Moliner Molins (ESP), Hart (AUS)

14 August 2008; 9:30	Report	Croatia	13–5	Germany	Ying Tung Natatorium, Beijing; Referees: Moliner Molins (ESP), Argyros (GRE)
14 August 2008; 9:30	Report	Score by quarters: 4–1, 3–2, 2–1, 4–1			Ying Tung Natatorium, Beijing; Referees: Moliner Molins (ESP), Argyros (GRE)
14 August 2008; 9:30	Report	Burić 3, Joković 2, Smodlaka 2, Marković 2, Bošković 2	Goals	Politze 2	Ying Tung Natatorium, Beijing; Referees: Moliner Molins (ESP), Argyros (GRE)

16 August 2008; 9:30	Report	Germany	8–7	Italy	Ying Tung Natatorium, Beijing; Referees: Brguljan (MNE), Turcotte (CAN)
16 August 2008; 9:30	Report	Score by quarters: 2–1, 3–1, 0–2, 3–3			Ying Tung Natatorium, Beijing; Referees: Brguljan (MNE), Turcotte (CAN)
16 August 2008; 9:30	Report	Schertwitis 2	Goals	Calcaterra 3	Ying Tung Natatorium, Beijing; Referees: Brguljan (MNE), Turcotte (CAN)

18 August 2008; 14:00	Report	United States	8–7	Germany	Ying Tung Natatorium, Beijing; Referees: Margeta (SLO), Kiszelly (HUN)
18 August 2008; 14:00	Report	Score by quarters: 3–2, 2–1, 2–2, 1–2			Ying Tung Natatorium, Beijing; Referees: Margeta (SLO), Kiszelly (HUN)
18 August 2008; 14:00	Report	Powers 2, Wright 2	Goals	Nossek 5	Ying Tung Natatorium, Beijing; Referees: Margeta (SLO), Kiszelly (HUN)

Classification semi-final

22 August 2008; 17:00	Report	Germany	9–13	Greece	Ying Tung Natatorium, Beijing; Referees: Ciric (SRB), Patelli (BRA)
22 August 2008; 17:00	Report	Score by quarters: 3–3, 1–3, 2–4, 3–3			Ying Tung Natatorium, Beijing; Referees: Ciric (SRB), Patelli (BRA)
22 August 2008; 17:00	Report	Nossek 3, Schertwitis 2, Kreuzmann 2	Goals	Ntoskas 6, Schizas 3, Theodoropoulos 2	Ying Tung Natatorium, Beijing; Referees: Ciric (SRB), Patelli (BRA)

Classification 9th–10th

24 August 2008; 09:30	Report	Italy	10–8	Germany	Ying Tung Natatorium, Beijing; Referees: Rak (CRO), Hart (AUS)
24 August 2008; 09:30	Report	Score by quarters: 4–3, 1–1, 1–1, 4–3			Ying Tung Natatorium, Beijing; Referees: Rak (CRO), Hart (AUS)
24 August 2008; 09:30	Report	Calcaterra 5, Gallo 2, Angelini 2	Goals	Savic 2, Schertwitis 2, Schlotterbeck 2	Ying Tung Natatorium, Beijing; Referees: Rak (CRO), Hart (AUS)

== Weightlifting ==
Athlete	Event	Snatch		Clean & Jerk		Total	Rank
Athlete	Event	Result	Rank	Result	Rank	Total	Rank
Artyom Shaloyan	Men's −69 kg	135	16	165	15	300	14
Jürgen Spieß	Men's −94 kg	173	=10	211	9	384	9
Matthias Steiner	Men's +105 kg	203	4	258	1	461	1st place, gold medalist(s)
Almir Velagic	Men's +105 kg	188	7	225	8	413	8
Julia Rohde	Women's −53 kg	82	7	103	8	185	7

== Wrestling ==
Key:

- VT - Victory by Fall.
- PP - Decision by Points - the loser with technical points.
- PO - Decision by Points - the loser without technical points.

Men's freestyle

Athlete	Event	Qualification	Round of 16	Quarterfinal	Semifinal	Repechage 1	Repechage 2	Final / BM	
Athlete	Event	Opposition Result	Opposition Result	Opposition Result	Opposition Result	Opposition Result	Opposition Result	Opposition Result	Rank
Davyd Bichinashvili	−84 kg	Bye	Mindorashvili (GEO); L 1–3 ^{PP}	Did not advance		Bye	Yenokyan (ARM); W 3–1 ^{PP}	Ketoev (RUS); L 1–3 ^{PP}	5
Stefan Kehrer	−96 kg	Bye	Koç (TUR); L 1–3 ^{PP}	Did not advance					13

Men's Greco-Roman

Athlete	Event	Qualification	Round of 16	Quarterfinal	Semifinal	Repechage 1	Repechage 2	Final / BM	
Athlete	Event	Opposition Result	Opposition Result	Opposition Result	Opposition Result	Opposition Result	Opposition Result	Opposition Result	Rank
Markus Thätner	−66 kg	Bye	Bayakhmetov (KAZ); L 1–3 ^{PP}	Did not advance					18
Konstantin Schneider	−74 kg	Bye	Zeghdane (ALG); W 3–1 ^{PP}	Kvirkelia (GEO); L 0–3 ^{PO}	Did not advance	Bye	Guénot (FRA); L 1–3 ^{PP}	Did not advance	9
Mirko Englich	−96 kg	Bye	Han T-Y (KOR); W 3–1 ^{PP}	Guri (ALB); W 3–1 ^{PP}	Wheeler (USA); W 3–1 ^{PP}	Bye		Khushtov (RUS); L 0–3 ^{PO}	2nd place, silver medalist(s)

Women's freestyle

Athlete	Event	Qualification	Round of 16	Quarterfinal	Semifinal	Repechage 1	Repechage 2	Final / BM	
Athlete	Event	Opposition Result	Opposition Result	Opposition Result	Opposition Result	Opposition Result	Opposition Result	Opposition Result	Rank
Alexandra Engelhardt	−48 kg	Bye	Bakatyuk (KAZ); L 0–3 ^{PO}	Did not advance					14
Anita Schätzle	−72 kg	—N/a	Prieto (FRA); W 5–0 ^{VT}	Wieszczek (POL); W 3–1 ^{PP}	Did not advance				7

== See also ==
- Germany at the 2008 Summer Paralympics
