= Rowing at the 2008 Summer Olympics – Women's quadruple sculls =

Women's quadruple sculls at the Games of the XXIX Olympiad

Medalists
| 1st place, gold medalist(s) | | Tang Bin; Jin Ziwei; Xi Aihua; Zhang Yangyang | China |
| 2nd place, silver medalist(s) | | Annabel Vernon; Debbie Flood; Frances Houghton; Katherine Grainger | Great Britain |
| 3rd place, bronze medalist(s) | | Britta Oppelt; Manuela Lutze; Kathrin Boron; Stephanie Schiller | Germany |

Women's quadruple sculls competition at the 2008 Summer Olympics in Beijing was held between August 10 and 17, at the Shunyi Olympic Rowing-Canoeing Park.

This rowing event is a quadruple scull event, meaning that each boat is propelled by four rowers. The "scull" portion means that each rower uses two oars, one on each side of the boat; this contrasts with sweep rowing in which each rower has one oar and rows on only one side. The competition consists of multiple rounds. Finals were held to determine the placing of each boat; these finals were given letters with those nearer to the beginning of the alphabet meaning a better ranking.

During the first round two heats were held. The top boat in each heat advanced to the A final, while all others went to the repechage. A single repechage heat was held, with the top four boats moving on to the A final and the remaining two being sent to the B final.

The second and final round was the Finals. Each final determined a set of rankings. The A final determined the medals, along with the rest of the places through 6th. The B final gave rankings to the two remaining crews, giving them places of 7th and 8th.

== Schedule ==
All times are China Standard Time (UTC+8)

| Date | Time | Round |
|---|---|---|
| Sunday, August 10, 2008 | '16:30-16:50 | Heats |
| Tuesday, August 12, 2008 | 16:50-17:00 | Repechage |
| Saturday, August 16, 2008 | 15:00-15:10 | Final B |
| Sunday, August 17, 2008 | 16:30-16:40 | Final A |

== Medalists ==
| Gold | Silver | Bronze |
|---|---|---|
| China; Tang Bin; Xi Aihua; Jin Ziwei; Zhang Yangyang | Great Britain; Annabel Vernon; Debbie Flood; Frances Houghton; Katherine Grainger | Germany; Britta Oppelt; Manuela Lutze; Kathrin Boron; Stephanie Schiller |

== Results ==
=== Heats ===
Qualification Rules: 1->FA, 2..->R

==== Heat 1 ====
| Rank | Rowers | Country | Time | Notes |
|---|---|---|---|---|
| 1 | Tang, Xi, Jin, Zhang | China | 6:11.83 | FA |
| 2 | Spiryukhova, Olefirenko, Lyal’chuk, Kolesnikova | Ukraine | 6:17.84 | R |
| 3 | de Jong, de Zwager, Hanson, Guloien | Canada | 6:23.27 | R |
| 4 | Kalinovskaya, Dorodnova, Merk, Levina | Russia | 6:26.21 | R |

==== Heat 2 ====
| Rank | Rowers | Country | Time | Notes |
|---|---|---|---|---|
| 1 | Vernon, Flood, Houghton, Grainger | Great Britain | 6:13.70 | FA |
| 2 | Oppelt, Lutze, Boron, Schiller | Germany | 6:15.26 | R |
| 3 | Pernell, Meyer, Kaido, Shumway | United States | 6:19.89 | R |
| 4 | Ives, Hore, Uphill, Bradley | Australia | 6:20.95 | R |

=== Repechage ===
Qualification Rules: 1-4->FA, 5..->FB

| Rank | Rowers | Country | Time | Notes |
|---|---|---|---|---|
| 1 | Oppelt, Lutze, Boron, Schiller | Germany | 6:36.17 | FA |
| 2 | Pernell, Meyer, Kaido, Shumway | United States | 6:39.53 | FA |
| 3 | Ives, Hore, Uphill, Bradley | Australia | 6:41.39 | FA |
| 4 | Spiryukhova, Olefirenko, Lyal’chuk, Kolesnikova | Ukraine | 6:41.45 | FA |
| 5 | de Jong, de Zwager, Hanson, Guloien | Canada | 6:46.60 | FB |
| 6 | Kalinovskaya, Dorodnova, Merk, Levina | Russia | 6:51.14 | FB |

=== Final B ===
| Rank | Rowers | Country | Time | Notes |
|---|---|---|---|---|
| 1 | Kalinovskaya, Dorodnova, Merk, Levina | Russia | 6:28.10 | |
| 2 | de Jong, de Zwager, Hanson, Guloien | Canada | 6:28.78 | |

=== Final A ===
| Rank | Rowers | Country | Time | Notes |
|---|---|---|---|---|
| Gold medal | Tang, Xi, Jin, Zhang | China | 6:16.06 | |
| Silver medal | Vernon, Flood, Houghton, Grainger | Great Britain | 6:17.37 | |
| Bronze medal | Oppelt, Lutze, Boron, Schiller | Germany | 6:19.56 | |
| 4 | Spiryukhova, Olefirenko, Lialchuk, Kolesnikova | Ukraine | 6:20.02 | |
| 5 | Pernell, Meyer, Kaido, Shumway | United States | 6:25.86 | |
| 6 | Ives, Hore, Uphill, Bradley | Australia | 6:30.05 | |
