= Tang Bin =

Chinese rower

Medal record

Women's rowing

Representing China

Olympic Games
Gold medal – first place	2008 Beijing	Quadruple sculls

World Rowing Championships
Bronze medal – third place	2007 Munich	W4x

Tang Bin (simplified Chinese: 唐宾; traditional Chinese: 唐賓; pinyin: Táng Bīn, born 25 April 1986 in Fengcheng, Dandong, Liaoning) is a female Chinese rower, who competed for Team China at the 2008 Summer Olympics, winning the gold medal in the women's quadruple sculls with Jin Ziwei, Xi Aihua and Zhang Yangyang.

== Major performances ==
- 2005 National Games – 1st fours;
- 2007 World Championships – 3rd quadruple sculls;
- 2007 World Cup Amsterdam – 1st quadruple sculls
