= Jin Ziwei =

Chinese rower (born 1985)

Medal record

Representing China

Rowing

Olympic Games
Gold medal – first place	2008 Beijing	Quadruple sculls

World Rowing Championships
Bronze medal – third place	2007 Munich	Quadruple sculls

Jin Ziwei (Chinese: 金紫薇; pinyin: Jīn Zǐwēi; born 17 October 1985 in Fengcheng, Dandong, Liaoning) is a female Chinese rower. She competed for Team China at the 2008 Summer Olympics, winning the gold medal as part of the Chinese women's quadruple sculls with Tang Bin, Xi Aihua and Zhang Yangyang.

== Major performances ==
- 2005 National Games – 1st double sculls
- 2007 World Championships – 3rd quadruple sculls
