= Rowing at the 2012 Summer Olympics – Women's double sculls =

Women's double sculls at the Games of the XXX Olympiad
- Venue: Eton Dorney
- Date: 30 July – 3 August 2012
- Competitors: 20 from 10 nations
- Winning time: 6:55.82

Medalists
1st place, gold medalist(s)		Anna Watkins; Katherine Grainger	Great Britain
2nd place, silver medalist(s)		Kim Crow; Brooke Pratley	Australia
3rd place, bronze medalist(s)		Magdalena Fularczyk; Julia Michalska	Poland

The Women's double sculls competition at the 2012 Summer Olympics in London took place are at Dorney Lake which, for the purposes of the Games venue, is officially termed Eton Dorney.

== Schedule ==
All times are British Summer Time (UTC+1)

Date	Time	Round
Monday, 30 July 2012	10:20	Heats
Tuesday, 31 July 2012	09:50	Repechage
Friday 3 August 2012	10:30	Final B
Friday, 3 August 2012	12:10	Final

== Results ==
=== Heats ===
First two of each heat qualify to the final, remainder goes to the repeachge.

==== Heat 1 ====
Rank	Rowers	Country	Time	Notes
1	Anna Watkins; Katherine Grainger	Great Britain	6:44.33	Q, OB
2	Fiona Paterson; Anna Reymer	New Zealand	6:49.44	Q
3	Wang Min; Zhu Weiwei	China	6:50.64	R
4	Inge Janssen; Ellen Hogerwerf	Netherlands	7:00.10	R
5	Lenka Antošová; Jitka Antošová	Czech Republic	7:05.05	R

==== Heat 2 ====
Rank	Rowers	Country	Time	Notes
1	Kim Crow; Brooke Pratley	Australia	6:48.80	Q
2	Magdalena Fularczyk; Julia Michalska	Poland	6:50.85	Q
3	Margot Shumway; Sarah Trowbridge	United States	6:55.25	R
4	Tina Manker; Stephanie Schiller	Germany	7:08.36	R
5	Hanna Kravchenko; Olena Buryak	Ukraine	7:09.40	R

=== Repechage ===
First two qualify to the final.

Rank	Rowers	Country	Time	Notes
1	Wang Min; Zhu Weiwei	China	7:09.65	Q
2	Margot Shumway; Sarah Trowbridge	United States	7:10.37	Q
3	Lenka Antošová; Jitka Antošová	Czech Republic	7:11.68	
4	Tina Manker; Stephanie Schiller	Germany	7:18.37	
5	Inge Janssen; Ellen Hogerwerf	Netherlands	7:19.80	
6	Anna Kravchenko; Olena Buryak	Ukraine	7:23.02	

=== Finals ===
==== Final B ====
Rank	Rowers	Country	Time	Notes
1	Lenka Antošová; Jitka Antošová	Czech Republic	7:24.93	
2	Inge Janssen; Ellen Hogerwerf	Netherlands	7:29.57	
3	Tina Manker; Stephanie Schiller	Germany	7:33.32	
4	Anna Kravchenko; Olena Buryak	Ukraine	7:36.65	

==== Final A ====
Rank	Rowers	Country	Time	Notes
1st place, gold medalist(s)	Anna Watkins; Katherine Grainger	Great Britain	6:55.82	
2nd place, silver medalist(s)	Kim Crow; Brooke Pratley	Australia	6:58.55	
3rd place, bronze medalist(s)	Magdalena Fularczyk; Julia Michalska	Poland	7:07.92	
4	Wang Min; Zhu Weiwei	China	7:08.92	
5	Fiona Paterson; Anna Reymer	New Zealand	7:09.82	
6	Margot Shumway; Sarah Trowbridge	United States	7:10.54	
