= Nick Garrett =

Nick Garrett may refer to:

- Nick Garrett (bass-baritone) (born 1978), English songwriter, pianist, composer, and arranger
- Nick Garrett (TV character), fictional character on TV series October Road

== See also ==
- Nick Garratt, Australian rowing coach
- Nicky Garratt, guitarist with punk rock band U.K. Subs
