= Tina Manker =

German rower (born 1989)

Tina Manker OLY
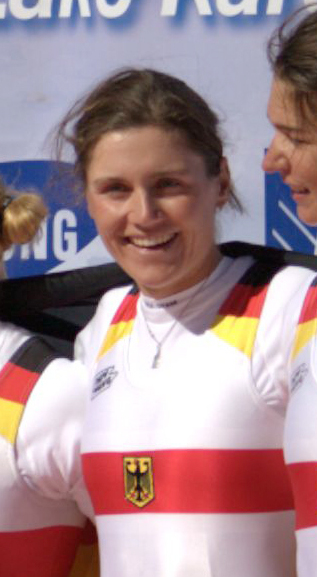
- Manker in 2010

Personal information
- Born: 3 March 1989 (age 37) Ludwigsfelde, Bezirk Potsdam, East Germany
- Education: International Institute of Modern Letters, VUW, Wellington
- Scientific career
- Thesis: New Zealand Young Adult Fiction: National Myths, Identity and Coming-of-age (2020)
Medal record
Women's rowing
Representing Germany
World Rowing Championships
Gold medal – first place	2011 Bled	W4x
Bronze medal – third place	2010 Karapiro	W4x
European Rowing Championships
Silver medal – second place	2010 Montemor-O-Velho	W4x

Tina Manker (born 3 March 1989) is a German rower. She was junior world champion in 2006 (junior quad scull), U23 world championship (double scull), and world champion in the women's quad sculls elite class at the 2011 World Championships. She finished her rowing career after participating at the 2012 Summer Olympics in double scull. She trained as a teacher in German and English, first at the Humboldt University of Berlin and then at Victoria University of Wellington in New Zealand. After several years teaching at Onslow College, where she also coached the rowing team, she now works for High Performance Sport New Zealand in Cambridge.

== Early life and education ==
Manker was born in March 1989 in Ludwigsfelde, Brandenburg. At the time, this was East Germany but the German reunification happened the following year. In 2000, she decided to enroll at Flatow-Oberschule, a sport school (Eliteschule des Sports) supported by the German Olympic Sports Confederation and in that year, she took up rowing. In 2008, she went to the Humboldt University of Berlin to become a teacher, majoring in German and English. During 2013, she studied for a graduate diploma in teaching at Victoria University of Wellington, from which she graduated in 2014. From 2018 to 2020, Manker was enrolled at the International Institute of Modern Letters, a centre of creative writing that is part of Victoria University of Wellington. She graduated with a Master of Arts, with her thesis titled New Zealand Young Adult Fiction: National Myths, Identity and Coming-of-age.

== Rowing career ==
What fascinates Manker about rowing is the constantly changing conditions of wind and water. She joined the Ruderklub am Wannsee in Berlin. At the 2006 World Rowing Junior Championships in Amsterdam, she became world champion in the junior quad scull. At the 2007 World Rowing Junior Championships in Beijing, she won silver in the single scull, beaten by the Chinese rower Zhu Weiwei. At the 2008 World Rowing U23 Championships in her native Brandenburg, she took the U23 world championship in the double scull alongside Sophie Dunsing.

At the 2009 World Rowing Championships in Poznań, Poland, she missed the A-final and came second in the B-final in the double scull alongside Dunsing. In 2010, she became German national champion in the double scull alongside Julia Richter, who is also a member of the Ruderklub am Wannsee. At the 2010 European Rowing Championships in Montemor-o-Velho, Portugal, she won silver in the quad scull alongside Britta Oppelt, Carina Bär, and Richter. The same team won bronze at the 2010 World Rowing Championships on Lake Karapiro in New Zealand. At the 2011 World Rowing Championships, Manker, Richter, Stephanie Schiller and Oppelt won the gold medal in the women's quadruple sculls. She competed at the 2012 Summer Olympics in the women's double sculls with Stephanie Schiller where they came third in the B-final. Soon after the Olympic Games finished, she said that she would put her rowing career on hold for some tertiary study at Victoria University of Wellington, but she never revived her rowing career.

== Professional career ==
After obtaining her teaching diploma in 2013, Manker taught English at Onslow College; the secondary school is located in Wellington's suburb of Johnsonville. She was in charge of the school's rowing club. She left Onslow College in 2021 and moved to High Performance Sport New Zealand, based in Cambridge at the rowing high performance centre.
