= Lindsay Clarke (rower) =

American rower

Personal information
- Nationality: American
- Born: September 23, 1988 (age 37) Seattle, Washington
- Spouse: Sean Clarke

Sport
- Sport: Rowing
Medal record
Women's rowing
Representing United States
Pan American Games
Silver medal – second place	2015 Toronto	Double sculls
Silver medal – second place	2015 Toronto	Quadruple sculls

Lindsay Clarke (née Meyer; born September 23, 1988) is an American rower. She was born in Seattle, Washington. She competed at the 2008 Summer Olympics in Beijing, where she placed fifth in quadruple sculls, together with Lia Pernell, Jennifer Kaido and Margot Shumway.

== Professional athletics career ==
=== Cooper Junior Rowing Club ===
Lindsay is currently one of the two head coaches at the Cooper Junior Rowing Club, the aggregate successor club to her former club, the South Jersey Rowing Club, and the Moorestown Rowing club.
