= Britta Oppelt =

German rower

Medal record

Women's rowing

Representing Germany

Olympic Games
Silver medal – second place	2004 Athens	Double sculls
Silver medal – second place	2012 London	Quadruple sculls
Bronze medal – third place	2008 Beijing	Quadruple sculls

World Championships
Gold medal – first place	2011 Lake Bled	Women's quad
Gold medal – first place	2013 Chungjiu	Women's quad
Silver medal – second place	2003 Milan	Double sculls
Silver medal – second place	2005 Gifu	Women's quad
Silver medal – second place	2006 Eton	Double sculls
Silver medal – second place	2007 Munich	Women's quad
Bronze medal – third place	2010 Lake Karapiro	Women's quad

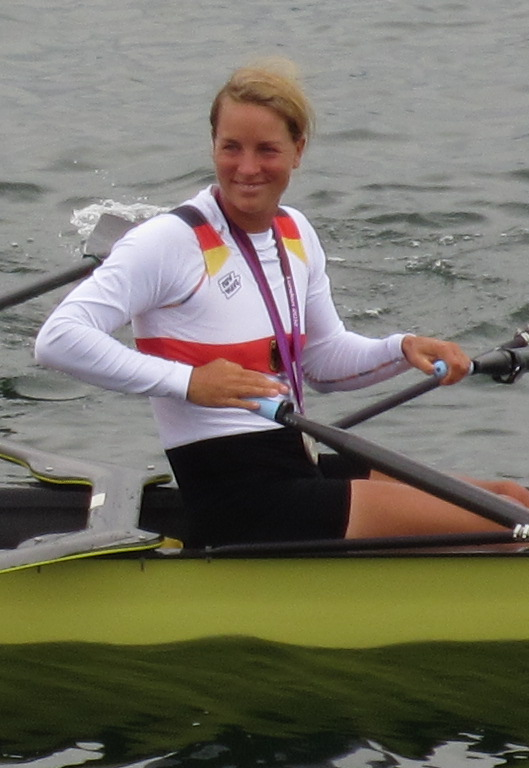

Britta Oppelt (born 5 July 1978) is a German Olympic-medal winning sculler.

Oppelt was born in East Berlin, and competed in the 2004 Summer Olympics in Athens, Greece, in the double sculls, and took home the silver medal along with teammate Peggy Waleska.

At the 2012 Summer Olympics, she was on the German quadruple sculls team that won the silver medal, along with Annekatrin Thiele, Carina Bär and Julia Richter.

In 2008, she was part of the German quadruple sculls team that won the bronze medal at the Beijing Olympics, along with Manuela Lutze, Kathrin Boron and Stephanie Schiller.

She is also a two-time world champion in the women's quadruple sculls in 2011 and 2013. In 2011, she rowed with Tina Manker, Stephanie Schiller and Julia Richter. In 2013, she rowed with Carina Bär, Julia Richter and Annekatrin Thiele. In the quadruple sculls, she has also won two world championship silver medals, in 2005 (with Susanne Schmidt, Kathrin Boron and Stephanie Schiller) and 2007 (with Manuela Lutze, Kathrin Boron and Stephanie Schiller), and a bronze in 2010 (with Carina Bär, Tina Manker and Julia Richter). She has also won two silvers medals at world level in the double sculls, in 2003 (with Kathrin Boron) and 2006 (with Susanne Schmidt).

At European level she has won quadruple sculls gold at the 2013 European Championships and silver at the 2010 European Championships.
