= Lia Pernell =

American rower (born 1981)

Personal information
- Nationality: American
- Born: August 16, 1981 (age 43); Berkeley, California

Sport
- Sport: Rowing

Lia Pernell (born August 16, 1981) is an American rower. She was born in Berkeley, California. She competed at the 2008 Summer Olympics in Beijing, where she placed fifth in quadruple sculls, together with Lindsay Meyer, Jennifer Kaido and Margot Shumway.

== See also ==
- List of Princeton University Olympians
