= Hanna Kravchenko =

Ukrainian rower

Personal information
- Nationality: Ukrainian
- Born: 25 June 1986 (age 39) Dnipropetrovsk, Ukrainian SSR, Soviet Union

Sport
- Sport: Rowing

Hanna Kravchenko (born 25 June 1986) is a Ukrainian rower. She competed in the women's double sculls event at the 2012 Summer Olympics.

Kravchenko earned a bronze medal in the women's double sculls at the 2013 Summer Universiade, alongside Olena Buryak. She competed in the European Rowing Championships and World Rowing Cup. In 2016, she took part in the FISA European and Final Olympic Qualification Regatta, placing sixth in the A final.

== Background ==
Hanna Kravchenko was born on 25 June 1986 in Dnipro (known as Dnipropetrovsk during the Soviet period). She was 186 cm tall and weighed 80 kg during her competitive years.
