= Wang Min (rower) =

Chinese rower (born 1990)

Wang Min (Chinese: 汪敏; born February 16, 1990) is a Chinese rower. She was born in Changzhou. She competed in double sculls together with Zhu Weiwei at the 2012 Summer Olympics in London, where they placed fourth.
