= Julia Michalska =

Polish rower (born 1985)

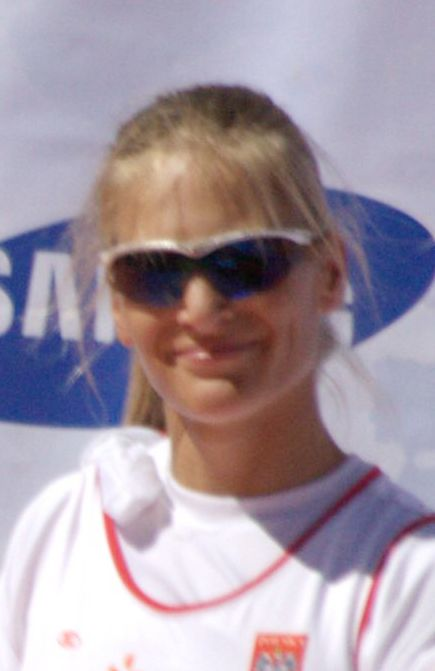
- Julia Michalska in 2010

Medal record

Women's rowing

Representing Poland

Olympic Games
Bronze medal – third place	2012 London	Double sculls

World Rowing Championships
Gold medal – first place	2009 Poznań	W2x
Bronze medal – third place	2010 Karapiro	W2x

European Championships
Silver medal – second place	2010 Montemor-o-Velho	W2x

Julia Ludwika Michalska-Płotkowiak (born 21 July 1985 in Kozienice) is a Polish rower.

At the 2008 Summer Olympics, she rowed in the women's single sculls, reaching the final but finishing in 8th place. At the 2012 Summer Olympics, she and her teammate Magdalena Fularczyk competed in the women's double sculls, winning the bronze medal.
