= Amy Clay =

Australian rower

Personal information
- Nickname: Ames
- Nationality: Australian
- Born: Amy Norina Clay; 14 December 1977 (age 48) Orange County, California, U.S.
- Height: 177 cm (5 ft 10 in) (2012)
- Weight: 70 kg (154 lb) (2012)

Sport
- Country: Australia
- Sport: Rowing
- Club: Mosman Rowing Club

Achievements and titles
- Olympic finals: 2008 Beijing W4X; 2012 London W4X
- World finals: 2

Amy Clay (born 14 December 1977) is an American born, Australian representative rower. She was selected to represent Australia at the 2008 Summer Olympics and the 2012 Summer Olympics in rowing.

== Personal ==
Nicknamed Ames, Clay was born on 14 December 1977 in the United States. She spent twelve years involved with gymnastics. She completed her early schooling in Myrtle Beach, South Carolina, and attended Lewis & Clark College in Portland, Oregon, where she earned a Bachelor of English in 2001. Within two years of finishing her degree, she moved to Australia. As of 2012, she lives in Sydney.

Clay is 177 centimetres (70 in) tall and weighs 70 kilograms (150 lb).

== Rowing ==
Clay is a rower competing in single, double and quadruple scull events. She started rowing in 1997 while living in Portland, Oregon while a freshman at Lewis and Clark College. As a member of the university team, she was coached by Hilary Gehman. She is a member of the Mosman Rowing Club, having joined the club in 2003. After her move to Australia she was coached by Nick Garratt.

In 2011, Clay was named the NSW Oarswoman of the Year. That year, she did not have a scholarship with the Australian Institute of Sport in rowing and had to work rowing into a schedule involving working full-time. She finished 4th in the quad event at the 2011 World Championships in Bled, Slovenia. She finished 5th in the quad event at the 2011 World Cup #3 in Lucerne, Switzerland. She finished 6th in the single event at the 2011 Australian Rowing Championships in West Lakes, South Australia. She finished 5th in the double event at the 2011 Australian Rowing Championships in West Lakes, South Australia. She finished 2nd in the quad event at the 2011 Australian Rowing Championships in West Lakes, South Australia.

Clay finished 5th in the quad event at the 2012 World Cup 3 in Munich, Germany. She finished 6th in the quad event at the 2012 World Cup 2 in Lucerne, Switzerland. She was selected to represent Australia at the 2012 Summer Olympics in rowing in the quadruple scull. Initially listed as a reserve, she replaced Pippa Savage who had been previously named to the boat but was removed because of "incompatibility issues" with the rest of the crew. Prior to going to London, she participated in a training camp at the Australian Institute of Sport European Training Centre in Varese, Italy. The Australian quadruple sculls team finished in 4th place.
