= Rowing at the 2011 Pan American Games – Women's single sculls =

Rowing – Women's single sculls at the 2011 Pan American Games
- Venue: Canoe & Rowing Course
- Dates: October 16 - October 18
- Competitors: 9 from 9 nations

Medalists
Gold medal	Margot Shumway	United States
Silver medal	Maria Best	Argentina
Bronze medal	Isolda Penney	Canada

The women's single sculls rowing event at the 2011 Pan American Games was held from October 16–18 at the Canoe & Rowing Course in Ciudad Guzman. The defending Pan American Games champion is Mayra González of Cuba.

== Schedule ==
All times are Central Standard Time (UTC-6).

Date	Time	Round
October 16, 2011	9:20	Heats
October 16, 2011	16:10	Repechage
October 18, 2011	9:16	Final B
October 18, 2011	9:25	Final A

== Results ==
=== Heat 1 ===
Rank	Rowers	Country	Time	Notes
1	Isolda Penney	Canada	7:53.97	FA
2	Maria Best	Argentina	7:54.05	FA
3	Margot Shumway	United States	7:57.97	R
4	Yariulvis Cobas	Cuba	8:10.43	R
5	Fabiola Nuñez	Mexico	8:21.38	R

=== Heat 2 ===
Rank	Rowers	Country	Time	Notes
1	Ana Vargas	El Salvador	8:04.49	FA
2	Kissya Costa	Brazil	8:12.90	FA
3	Jenesis Perez	Venezuela	8:44.08	R
4	Liliana Boruchowicz	Costa Rica	9:50.02	R

=== Repechage ===
Rank	Rowers	Country	Time	Notes
1	Margot Shumway	United States	8:02.93	FA
2	Yariulvis Cobas	Cuba	8:11.92	FA
3	Fabiola Nuñez	Mexico	8:18.57	FB
4	Jenesis Perez	Venezuela	8:49.09	FB
5	Liliana Boruchowicz	Costa Rica	9:05.57	FB

=== Final B ===
Rank	Rowers	Country	Time	Notes
7	Fabiola Nuñez	Mexico	8:22.44	
8	Jenesis Perez	Venezuela	8:52.46	
9	Liliana Boruchowicz	Costa Rica	8:54.91	

=== Final A ===
Rank	Rowers	Country	Time	Notes
1st place, gold medalist(s)	Margot Shumway	United States	7:53.05	
2nd place, silver medalist(s)	Maria Best	Argentina	7:55.55	
3rd place, bronze medalist(s)	Isolda Penney	Canada	8:06.88	
4	Yariulvis Cobas	Cuba	8:13.63	
5	Ana Vargas	El Salvador	8:16.85	
6	Kissya Costa	Brazil	8:23.21	
