= Zoe Uphill =

Australian rower

Zoe Uphill (born 8 September 1982 in Canberra, Australian Capital Territory, Australia) is an Australian rower. She competed in the women's quadruple sculls at the 2008 Summer Olympics.
