= Anna Reymer =

New Zealand rower

Personal information
- Born: 18 November 1985 (age 40) Tokoroa, New Zealand
- Height: 174 cm (5 ft 9 in)
- Weight: 71 kg (157 lb)
Medal record
Women's rowing
Representing New Zealand
World Championships
Bronze medal – third place	2011 Bled	W2x

Anna Reymer (born 18 November 1985) is a New Zealand rower.

She was born in Tokoroa. She competed in double sculls together with Fiona Paterson at the 2012 Summer Olympics in London, where they placed fifth.
