= Stephanie Schiller =

German rower

Medal record

Women's rowing

Representing Germany

Olympic Games
Bronze medal – third place	2008 Beijing	Quadruple sculls

World Championships
Gold medal – first place	2011 Lake Bled	W4x
Silver medal – second place	2005 Gifu	W4x
Silver medal – second place	2007 Munich	W4x
Bronze medal – third place	2006 Eton (Note: The 2006 World Championship result was upgraded from 4th place after a member of the Russian crew that originally won the race was disqualified for doping.)	W4x
Bronze medal – third place	2009 Poznan	W4x

Stephanie Schiller (born 25 July 1986 in Potsdam, East Germany) is an Olympic-medalist sculler, winning a bronze medal in the women's quadruple sculls at the 2008 Summer Olympics (with Britta Oppelt, Manuela Lutze and Kathrin Boron). She also won a World Championship gold medal in the same event with Julia Richter, Tina Manker and Britta Oppelt.
