= Ignacy Bąk =

Polish handball player (born 1995)

Personal information
- Nationality: Polish
- Born: 11 August 1995 (age 31) Tychy, Poland
- Height: 1.96 m (6 ft 5 in)

Sport
- Sport: Handball
- Position: Right back
- Current club: Wilhelmshavener HV

Youth career
- Years: Team
- –2011: MOSiR Mysłowice

Senior clubs
- Years: Team
- 2011–2014: SMS Gdańsk
- 2014–2016: SPR Chrobry Głogów
- 2016–2017: Gwardia Opole
- 2017: MMTS Kwidzyn
- 2017–2020: NMC Górnik Zabrze
- 2020–2021: Riihimäen Cocks
- 2021–2022: Al Wakrah
- 2022: AC Diomidis Argous
- 2022–: Wilhelmshavener HV
National team
Years	Team	Apps	(Gls)
2017–	Poland	7	(2)

Ignacy Bąk (born 11 August 1995) is a Polish handball player for Wilhelmshavener HV and the Polish national team.
