= Oliver Köhrmann =

German handball player (born 1976)

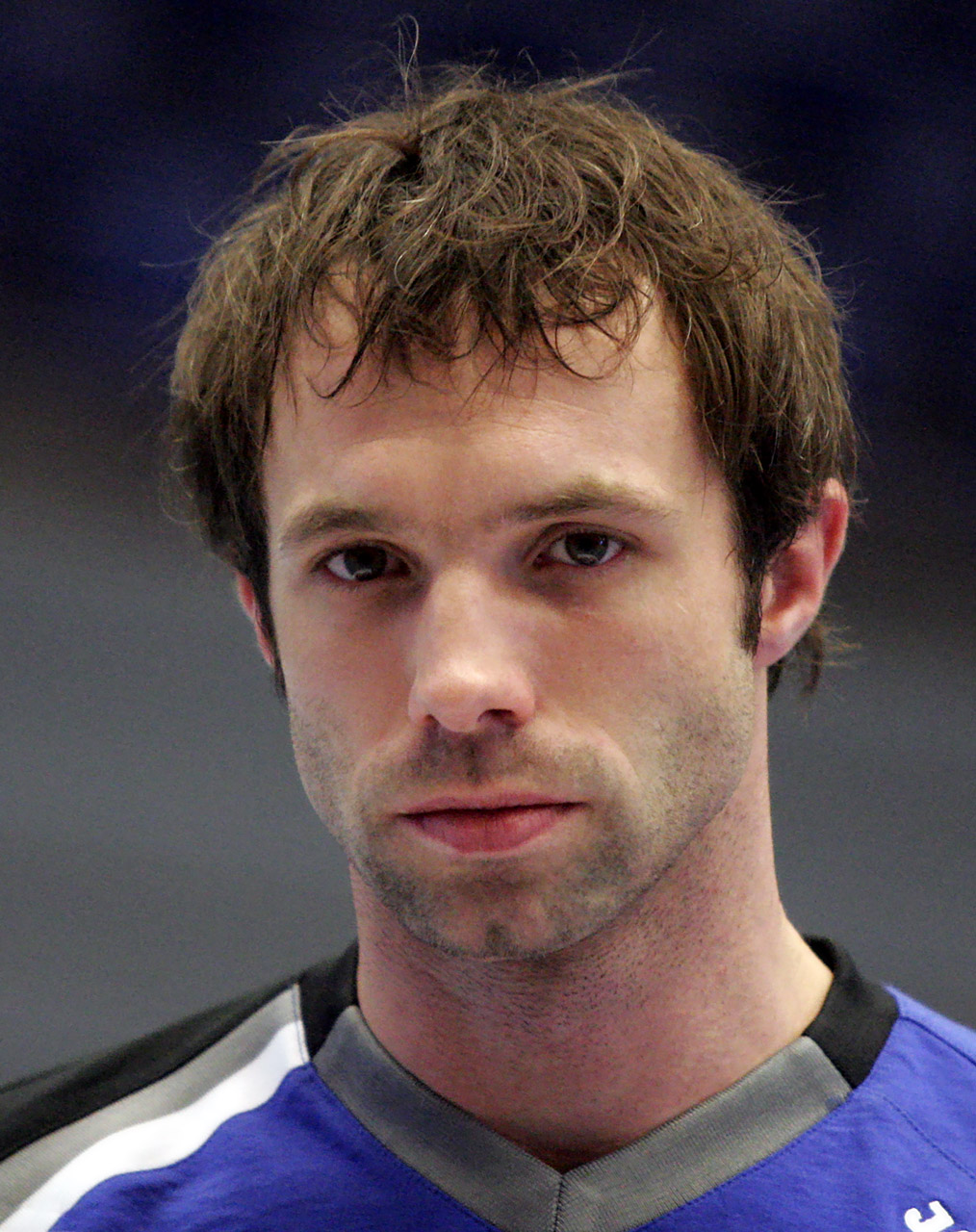

Personal information
- Nationality: German
- Born: July 28, 1976 (age 50) Oldenburg, West Germany
- Height: 186 cm (73 in)

Sport
- Sport: Handball
- Position: Centre back

Senior clubs
- Years: Team
- –: TSG Hatten-Sandkrug
- 1997-2008: Wilhelmshavener HV
- 2008-2013: TV Großwallstadt
- 2013-2018: Wilhelmshavener HV
National team
Years	Team	Apps	(Gls)
2005-	Germany	17	(14)

Teams managed
- 2013-: Wilhelmshavener HV (assistant coach)
- Updated on 16 September 2016

Oliver Köhrmann (born 28 July 1976) is a retired German handball player. He played primarily as a centre back.

== Career ==
Köhrmann was born in Oldenburg. He began his handball career at TSG Hatten-Sandkrug. He joined Wilhelmshavener HV in 1997, where he spent the majority of his career, playing for the club in two separate stints. From 2008 to 2013, he played for TV Großwallstadt. In 2013, he returned to Wilhelmshavener HV, initially as a player and later also taking on the role of assistant coach.

Köhrmann made his debut for the German national team on 16 March 2005, against Estonia. He earned 17 caps and scored 14 goals for Germany. He competed at the 2008 Summer Olympics in Beijing, where the German team placed 9th.

Köhrmann was known for his experience and leadership on the court. He was considered a playmaker with a good eye for the game.

== Coaching career ==
After returning to Wilhelmshaven in 2013, Köhrmann became the assistant coach, while continuing as a player. He served alongside head coach Andrzey Staszewski. While his exact end date to playing is difficult to pinpoint, it is suggested he has had multiple comebacks to play, as late as 2018.
