= Fiona Paterson =

New Zealand rower

Personal information
- Born: 9 February 1983 (age 43) Dunedin, New Zealand
- Height: 182 cm (6 ft 0 in)
- Weight: 81 kg (179 lb)
Medal record
Women's rowing
Representing New Zealand
World Championships
Bronze medal – third place	2011 Bled	W2x
World U23 Regatta
Gold medal – first place	2004 Poznań	BW4x

Fiona Paterson (born 9 February 1983) is a New Zealand rower.

== Biography ==
Paterson was born in Dunedin in 1983, and grew up in the Ida Valley as the second youngest of seven siblings. She first competed at World Rowing Junior Championships in 2000 in Zagreb, Croatia, where she came eighth with the junior women's eight. At the World Rowing Junior Championships 2001 in Duisburg, Germany, she came sixth with the junior women's eight. At the 2003 World Rowing U23 Regatta in Belgrade, Serbia, she came fourth with the U23 women's four with fellow members Bess Halley, Darnelle Timbs and Andrea Rix-Trott. She became world champion at the U23 World Rowing Championship in Poznań, Poland, in 2004 with the U23 women's quadruple sculls with fellow members Bess Halley, Darnelle Timbs and Jaime Nielsen.

In January 2006 at age 22, she was diagnosed with an aggressive form of cervical cancer, was operated on and underwent chemotherapy and radiation treatment. Only a year later, she returned to rowing and was part of the women's eight that unsuccessfully tried to qualify for the 2008 Summer Olympics; at the 2007 World Rowing Championships in Munich, Germany, they came ninth, and at both the first two World Rowing Cup regattas in 2008, the team came eighth.

In World Rowing Cup regattas in 2010, she competed in women's quadruple sculls with Emma Feathery, Paula Twining, and Louise Trappitt, and they came sixth in Munich, Germany, and in Lucerne, Switzerland. At the 2010 World Rowing Championships at Lake Karapiro, New Zealand, she rowed in the women's double sculls with Feathery and placed seventh. At the 2011 World Rowing Championships in Bled, Slovenia, she teamed up with Anna Reymer in the women's double sculls and won bronze.

She competed in double sculls with Reymer at the 2012 Summer Olympics in London, where they placed fifth. Paterson retired after the 2012 Summer Olympics and moved to Christchurch, where she worked as a rowing coach and physical education teacher at Rangi Ruru Girls' School while completing a post-graduate teaching diploma at the city's New Zealand Graduate School of Education. In 2015, Paterson made a comeback and was selected by Rowing New Zealand to be part of the 57-strong training squad from which the nine boat teams will be chosen. At the New Zealand national championships at Lake Karapiro on 16 February 2016, Paterson competed with Rebecca Scown in the women's coxless pair, and they were beaten by Emma Dyke and Grace Prendergast for second place. When the Olympic rowing team was announced on 4 March 2016, Scown and Genevieve Behrent were chosen instead of Paterson; they would win bronze in their event.
