= Svitlana Spiriukhova =

Ukrainian rower (born 1982)

Medal record

Women's rowing

Representing Ukraine

World Rowing Championships
Gold medal – first place	2009 Poznań	W4x

European Rowing Championships
Gold medal – first place	2007 Poznań	W4x
Gold medal – first place	2008 Marathon	W4x
Gold medal – first place	2009 Brest	W4x
Gold medal – first place	2011 Plovdiv	W4x

Svitlana Anatoliïvna Spiriukhova (Ukrainian: Світлана Анатоліївна Спірюхова; born 5 April 1982 in Mykolaiv) is a Ukrainian rower.
