= Anna-Marie de Zwager =

Canadian rower (born 1976)

Anna-Marie de Zwager (born September 17, 1976) is a Canadian rower from Victoria, British Columbia.

At the 2004 Summer Olympics, she finished in 7th place in the women's eight event, and at the 2008 Summer Olympics, she finished in 8th place in the women's quad sculls.

She attended the University of Victoria where she also played in goal on the Varsity field hockey side.

== Biography ==
de Zwager completed her kinesiology Co-op degree at the University of Victoria. At that time, she was a member of the Varsity Field Hockey Team. After starting a business, she worked her way onto two Canadian Olympic Teams. She competed in Athens 2004 (Women’s Eight) and Beijing 2008 (Women’s Quad). She also experienced success on the indoor rowing machine, winning the Canadian Indoor Rowing Championships twice (2007 & 2008) and the World Indoor Rowing Championships three times (2007, 2017 and 2018). She has retired from sport, and is now in the field of active rehabilitation.
