= Zhu Weiwei =

Chinese rower (born 1990)

Personal information
- Nationality: Chinese
- Born: 22 May 1990 (age 34); Changzhou

Sport
- Sport: Rowing

Zhu Weiwei (born 22 May 1990) is a Chinese rower. She was born in Changzhou. She competed in double sculls together with Wang Min at the 2012 Summer Olympics in London, where they placed fourth.
