= Nick Garratt =

Australian rowing coach (1947–2019)

Nicholas Richard Garratt AM (6 December 1947 – 8 July 2019) was an Australian rowing coach. He was the head coach of Rowing ACT, coaching the ACT High Performance Program along with the ACT Academy of Sport Rowing Program, in Canberra, Australia.

== Biography ==
Garratt previously held down the role as the head coach at Haberfield Rowing Club (now UTS Rowing Club) from 1988 to 1992. He moved back to Western Australia to take on the role of talent identification coach at the Western Australian Institute of Sport, a position he held until 1995. From there he held the head coach position at Mosman Rowing Club, in Sydney, Australia, until early 2017.

In 1995 he coached his first Australian crew, Tim Perkins and Stuart Reside at the 1995 World Junior Rowing Championships in Poznan, Poland. The West Australian combination suffered an ill-fated campaign with Reside being struck down by food poisoning, with the illness affecting more than half of the Australian team. Cameron Taylor (Queensland) was subbed into the crew for Reside and after making it through the heats, the crew had to withdraw to allow Taylor to focus on his other event.

The following year in Strathclyde, Scotland, Garratt's crews enjoyed considerable success coaching at the 1996 World Junior Rowing Championships. Stuart Reside won gold in the Men's Single Scull, while Garratt also coached the gold medal winning Men's Double Scull of Jonathan Fievez and Tim Perkins.

Success continued for Garratt in 1997 at the World Junior Rowing Championships as he coached Amber Bradley to a gold medal in the Women's Single Scull.

His first Olympics as a coach was at the Sydney Olympic Games in 2000. Garratt coached the Men's Quad Scull of Peter Hardcastle, Jason Day, Stuart Reside and Duncan Free to a 4th-placed finish.

Garratt coached two crews at the 2004 Olympics in Athens, Greece. Craig Jones placed 11th in the Men's Single Scull, while Brendan Long and Peter Hardcastle finished 12th in the Men's Double Scull.

Garratt coached five Mosman athletes onto the 2008 Olympic team (Peter Hardcastle, Tom Laurich, Daniel Noonan, Zoe Uphill and Amy Clay). Two (Uphill and Clay) were part of the Women's Quad Scull crew with Amber Bradley and Kerry Hore. The crew were coached by Nick Garratt and made the A Final where they placed 6th.

The 2012 London Olympics were Garratt's fourth as a coach. He coached the Australian Women's Eight to a 6th placing after qualifying the boat earlier in the year in Europe.

In 2016, Garratt was appointed a Member in the General Division of the Order of Australia (AM) in the Australia Day Honours.

In the same year his latest young charge, Tom Schramko, achieved all (1x, 2x,4x) National under-23 men's heavyweight sculling gold as well as stroking the Australian Under23 quad scull to World Championship success in Rotterdam.

Nick died on 8 July 2019 at the age of 71, while coaching the Australian under-23 rowing team.
