= Sarah Trowbridge =

American rower

Personal information
- Born: September 27, 1982 (age 43) Washington DC, United States

Sport
- Sport: Rowing
Medal record
Representing United States
Pan American Games
Gold medal – first place	2007 Rio de Janeiro	Double sculls
Silver medal – second place	2007 Rio de Janeiro	Quadruple sculls

Sarah Trowbridge (born September 27, 1982) is an American rower. She began rowing in high school in Guilford, Connecticut and won two Big 10 championships at the University of Michigan. She joined the U.S. national team in 2008. She qualified for the 2012 Summer Olympics in the women's double sculls with partner Margot Shumway. They finished 6th in the finals.

In August 2017, she was named head coach of the women’s rowing team at the University of San Diego.

Trowbridge graduated in 2006 from the University of Michigan with a degree in English.

She is married to Olympic gold medalist rower Bryan Volpenhein.
