= Xi Aihua =

Chinese rower

Medal record

Representing China

Rowing
Gold medal – first place	2008 Beijing	Quadruple sculls

Xi Aihua (simplified Chinese: 奚爱华; traditional Chinese: 奚愛華; pinyin: Xī ÀiHuá; born 27 January 1982 in Shouguang, Shandong) is a female Chinese rower, who competed for Team China at the 2008 Summer Olympics.

== Major performances ==
- 2001/2005 National Games – 2nd eights/single sculls;
- 2002 National Championships – 1st double/quadruple sculls;
- 2006/2007 World Cup Poznan/Amsterdam – 2nd/1st quadruple sculls;
- 2006/2007 World Championships – 4th/3rd quadruple sculls
