= Zhang Yangyang (rower) =

Chinese rower

Personal information
- Born: 20 February 1989 (age 37) Siping, Jilin, China
Medal record
Representing China
Rowing
| Gold medal – first place | 2008 Beijing | Quadruple sculls |

Zhang Yangyang (simplified Chinese: 张杨杨; traditional Chinese: 張楊楊; pinyin: Zhāng Yángyáng, born 20 February 1989 in Siping, Jilin) is a female Chinese rower, who competed for Team China at the 2008 Summer Olympics.

== Records ==
- 2006/2007 National Championships – 3rd single sculls;
- 2007/2008 World Cup Austria/Munich – 4th quadruple sculls;
