= Wilhelmshavener HV =

German handball club

- Full name: Wilhelmshavener Handball-Verein e.V.
- Founded: 1995; 30 years ago
- Arena: Nordfrost-Arena
- Capacity: 2,433
- President: Florian Voelter
- Head coach: Christian Köhrmann
- League: 3. Liga
- 2021–2022: 3rd
- Club colours
Home	Away

Wilhelmshavener HV is a handball club from Wilhelmshaven, Germany. Currently, they compete in the 3. Liga.

The club has oscillated between the third division and the top tier throughout its history.

In September 2020 the managing director of WHV-Sportmarketing GmbH Maik Menninga, who is also the main sponsor, was remanded in custody; together with three other suspects, he is said to have cheated investors by 2.5 million euros. The offices of the association were then searched by the Würzburg public prosecutor's office. WHV-Sportmarketing GmbH filed for insolvency in October 2020.

== Accomplishments ==
- 3. Liga: 2
  - Gold: 2015, 2020

== Team ==
=== Current squad ===
Squad for the 2022–23 season

Goalkeepers

- 12 (Germany) Levin Stasch
- 51 (Czech Republic) Jakub Lefan

Left wingers

- 6 (Germany) Sebastian Maas
- (Germany) Corvin Troschke

Right wingers

- 10 (Germany) Okke Dröge
- (Spain) Sergi Alá Sánchez

Line players

- 44 (Germany) Alexander Coßmann
- 86 (Croatia) Gabriel Mišetić

Left backs

- 13 (Germany) Sven Eberlein
- 29 (Croatia) Matej Kožul
- 33 (Germany) Tobias Schwolow

Centre backs

- 21 (Germany) Justin Herrmann
- 24 (Germany) Paul Hein
- (Germany) Jonas Schweigart

Right backs

- 74 (Germany) Maximilian Mißling
- 90 (Germany) René Drechsler
- (Poland) Ignacy Bąk

=== Transfers ===
Transfers for the 2022–23 season

Joining

- (Germany) Corvin Troschke (LW) (from (Germany) THW Kiel II)
- (Germany) Jonas Schweigart (CB) (from (Germany) OHV Aurich)
- (Poland) Ignacy Bąk (RB) (from (Greece) AC Diomidis Argous)
- (Spain) Sergi Alá Sánchez (RW) (from (Germany) VfL Günzburg)

Leaving

- (Bosnia and Herzegovina) Vedran Delić (LW) (to ?)
- (Croatia) Duje Maretić (RW) (to ?)
