= Manuela Lutze =

German rower

Medal record

Women's rowing

Representing Germany

Olympic Games
Gold medal – first place	2000 Sydney	Quadruple sculls
Gold medal – first place	2004 Athens	Quadruple sculls
Bronze medal – third place	2008 Beijing	Quadruple sculls

World Rowing Championships
Gold medal – first place	1997 Lac d'Aiguebelette	Women's quad
Gold medal – first place	1998 Cologne	Women's quad
Gold medal – first place	1999 St. Catharines	Women's quad
Gold medal – first place	2001 Lucerne	Women's quad
Gold medal – first place	2002 Seville	Women's quad
Silver medal – second place	2007 Munich	Women's quad
Bronze medal – third place	2003 Milan	Women's quad

Manuela Lutze (born 20 March 1974 in Blankenburg am Harz, East Germany) is a multi Olympic-medaling sculler who competed in four Olympics, winning two gold medals and a bronze medal. In addition, she has also won 5 Gold Medals in the Quadruple Sculls event at the World Championships, beginning with Lac d'Aiguebelette, France in 1997.
