= Margot Shumway =

American rower (born 1979)

Personal information
- Nationality: American
- Born: August 2, 1979 (age 46) Cincinnati, Ohio

Sport
- Sport: Rowing
Medal record
Women's rowing
Representing the United States
Pan American Games
Gold medal – first place	2011 Guadalajara	Single sculls

Margot Shumway (born August 2, 1979) is an American rower. She was born in Cincinnati, Ohio. She competed at the 2008 Summer Olympics in Beijing, where she place fifth in quadruple sculls. She competed in double sculls together with Sarah Trowbridge at the 2012 Summer Olympics in London, where they placed sixth.
