= Kathrin Boron =

German rower

Personal information
- Born: 4 November 1969 (age 56) Eisenhüttenstadt, East Germany
Medal record
Women's rowing
Olympic Games
Representing Germany
| Gold medal – first place | 1992 Barcelona | Double sculls |
| Gold medal – first place | 1996 Atlanta | Quad sculls |
| Gold medal – first place | 2000 Sydney | Double sculls |
| Gold medal – first place | 2004 Athens | Quad sculls |
| Bronze medal – third place | 2008 Beijing | Quad sculls |
World Rowing Championships
Representing East Germany
| Gold medal – first place | 1989 Bled | Quad sculls |
| Gold medal – first place | 1990 Tasmania | Double sculls |
Representing Germany
| Gold medal – first place | 1991 Vienna | Double sculls |
| Gold medal – first place | 1997 Aiguebelette | Double sculls |
| Gold medal – first place | 1997 Aiguebelette | Quad sculls |
| Gold medal – first place | 1998 Cologne | Quad sculls |
| Gold medal – first place | 1999 St. Catharines | Double sculls |
| Gold medal – first place | 2001 Lucerne | Double sculls |
| Silver medal – second place | 1993 Račice | Double sculls |
| Silver medal – second place | 1994 Indianapolis | Single sculls |
| Silver medal – second place | 2003 Milan | Double sculls |
| Silver medal – second place | 2005 Gifu | Quad sculls |
| Silver medal – second place | 2007 Munich | Quad sculls |

Kathrin Boron (born 4 November 1969) is a German sculler, and four-time Olympic gold medallist. She's an athlete of the SV Dynamo / SG Dynamo Potsdam.

Boron won the women's double sculls at the 1992 Summer Olympics with Kerstin Köppen and 2000 Summer Olympics with Jana Thieme, and the women's quad sculls at the 1996 Summer Olympics and 2004 Summer Olympics. At the 2008 Summer Olympics, she finished third in the quad sculls. In addition, Boron has won seven World Championship Gold Medals and five Silver, starting with gold in the double sculls at Tasmania in 1990.

Boron was honoured for her outstanding career in rowing with the 2009 Thomas Keller Medal.
