= Australian Coach Awards =

- Description: Awards established to promote best practice in coaching and recognize outstanding coaches
- Country: Australia
- Presented by: Australian Coaching Council
- Status: Concluded

Australian Coach Awards were established by the Australian Coaching Council in 1990 to promote best practice in coaching and those coaches that stood out amongst their peers. The awards finished after the Australian Coaching Council became part of the Australian Sports Commission's Sport Education Unit on 1 July 2000.

== Individual Coach of the Year ==
Year	Coach	
1990	Craig Hilliard	Athletics
1991	Terry Gathercole	Swimming
1992	John Carew	Swimming
1993	Charlie Walsh	Cycling
1994	John Carew	Swimming
1995	Charlie Walsh	Cycling
1996	Wayne Roycroft	Equestrian
1997	Peter Fortune - Male; Jackie Byrnes - Female	Athletics; Athletics
1998	Gennadi Touretski - Male; Donna Ray-Szalinski - Female	Swimming; Cycling
1999	Doug Frost - Male; Lesley Bowrey	Swimming; Tennis
2000	Peter Fortune - Male; Carolyn Lieutenant - Female	Athletics; Equestrian

== Team Coach of the Year ==
Year	Coach	Sport
1990	Tim Sheens	Rugby league
1991	Ju Ping Tian	Gymnastics
1992	Noel Donaldson	Rowing
1993	Charlie Walsh	Cycling
1994	Richard Charlesworth	Field hockey
1995	Charlie Walsh	Cycling
1996	Richard Charlesworth	Field hockey
1997	Richard Charlesworth - Male; Norma Plummer - Female	Field hockey Netball
1998	Richard Charlesworth - Male; Jill McIntosh - Female	Field hockey Netball
1999	Richard Charlesworth - Male; Jill McIntosh - Female	Field hockey Netball
2000	Richard Charlesworth - Male; Marg Angove - Female	Field hockey Netball

== Young Coach of the Year ==
Year	Coach	Sport
1990	Ellen Randell	Rowing
1991	Shaun Panayi - Male; Fiona Bird - Female	Diving; Gymnastics
1992	Steve Evans - Male; Fiona Bird - Female	Rowing; Gymnastics
1993	Glenn Beringen - Male; Carrie Graf - Female	Swimming; Basketball
1994	Michael Piper - Male; Jennifer Banks - Female	Swimming; Wheelchair Athletics
1995	Michael Doyle - Male	Rowing
1996	Steve Rippon - Male; Carrie Graf - Female	Athletics; Basketball

== Domestic League Coach of the Year ==
Year	Coach	Sport
1997	John Buchanan	Cricket
1998	Wayne Bennett; Malcolm Blight	Rugby league Australian football
1999	Chris Anderson	Rugby league
2000	Kevin Sheedy	Australian football

== Eunice Gill Coach Education Merit Awards ==
Award in honour of Eunice Gill who played a major role in coach development including Chairperson of the Australian Coaching Council from 1982 to 1986.

Year	Coach
1990	Adrian Hurley, Magda Mayer, Jess Jarver, James Pappas, Frank Johnston, Eric Worthington
1991	Reinhold Batschi, Marlene Matthews, Paul Broughton, Frank Pyke, Margaret Corbett, Ron Tindall, Keith Holman
1992	Jack Pross, Ron Smith
1993	John Boas, Patrick Hunt, Don Cameron, David Parkin, Kay Cox, Paul Quinlan
1994	Val Beitzel, Nigel Champion, Dennis Coffey, Brian Cook, Brian Douge, Kay Haarsma, Tony Rice, Paul Webb, Jeff Wollstein
1995	Joyce Brown, Roger Flynn, Edwin Johnson, Alan Launder, Wendy Piltz, Sean Scott, Peter Spence, Peta Whitford
1996	Cary Thompson, Angela Calder, Kelli Chilton, Chris Nunn
1997	Neil Craig, Anne Green, Ralph Richards, Lawrie Woodman
1998	Peter Corcoran
1999	Deidre Anderson, Judy Bosler, Bill Sweetenham
2000	Neil Barras, Neville Bleakley, Wayne Goldsmith, Kerry McGough

== Other awards ==
- 1999 - Scholarship Coach of the Year - Yvette Yin Luo (Badminton)
- 1999 - Award for Services to Coaches - Ron Tindall (WA Coaching Foundation)

== See also ==
- Australian Institute of Sport Awards
- Australian Sport Awards
