= John Daly (academic) =

Australian academic physical educator and sports historian

John Alfred Daly OAM (7 August 1936 – 11 March 2018) was an Australian academic physical educator, sports historian and Australian Olympic athletics coach.

== Academic career ==
Daly was a graduate of the University of Adelaide. He was appointed to Adelaide Teachers College in 1961 after three years teaching at Lefevre Boys Technical High School. The University of Adelaide physical education diploma course was transferred to the College in 1968 and Daly designed and headed a four-year degree course. Daly took leave to complete a master's degree and PhD in history and sociology of sport at the University of Illinois at Urbana–Champaign. Daly was a Principal Lecturer and Head of Department at the Adelaide College of the Arts and Education, which later became part of the University of South Australia, for 20 years. He retired from academic life in 1996. After his retirement, he returned to his love of drawing and painting and exhibited his works of art.

== Coaching career ==
Before moving into coaching, Daly was a member of the Adelaide Harriers Club where he competed in sprint events. Daly was a prominent Australian athletics coach and official. Major athletics appointments included:

- Olympic Games - 1976 (Head Coach), 1980 (Head Coach), 1984 (Head Coach), 1988 (Section Manager), 1992 (Section Manager)
- Commonwealth Games - 1974 (Coach)
- IAAF World Championships - 1983, 1991 (Manager)
- IAAF World Cup - Coach for Oceania Team 1975, 1979, 1981, 1989

He was Glynis Nunn's coach when she won the Women's heptathlon at the 1984 Los Angeles Olympics.

In 1974, Daly established the Australian Track and Field Coaches Association. In 1978, Daly was a founding member of the Australian Coaching Council. From 1979 to 1981, he was the chairman of the Council's Technical Committee which introduced a national coaching accreditation scheme based on Canada's model.

== Administration ==
In 1976, after Australia's poor performance at the Montreal Olympics, Daly wrote an open letter in The Australian titled Courageous Amateurs Must Fail. This controversial letter argued that the Australian sports system was out of date and it was not the athletes and coaches' fault for poor results in Montreal.

He was a member of the Australian Government's Sport Advisory Council from 1979 to 1984. In 1981, he was appointed as an inaugural member of the Australian Institute of Sport (AIS) Board and held this position until 1985. In 1991, he authored the book Quest for Excellence: the Australian Institute of Sport in Canberra which detailed the first ten years of the AIS.

He married athlete Judy Tapfield, a South Australian state, national and international Masters champion and a member of Adelaide Harriers, in 1976. Judy Daly died on 1 November 2017.

John died on 11 March 2018, aged 81, in Hahndorf, South Australia.

== Books ==
- "Ours were the hearts to dare": a history of women's amateur athletics in South Australia, 1930-1980, Adelaide, J.A. Daly, 1982.
- The Adelaide hunt: a history of the Adelaide Hunt Club, 1840-1986, Adelaide, Adelaide Hunt Club, 1986.
- Elysian fields: sport, class and community in colonial South Australia, 1836-1890, Adelaide, J.A. Daly, 1982.
- Quest for Excellence: the Australian Institute of Sport in Canberra, Canberra, AGPS, 1991.
- Feminae ludens: women's competitive sport in SA, 1936-1956 and the influence of sportswriter Lois Quarrell, [Adelaide?]: J.A. Daly, 1994.
- Against the odds: a pictorial history of 100 years of South Australian women in sport and recreation, Adelaide, Office for Recreation, Sport & Racing, 1994.
- The splendid journey: a centenary history of amateur swimming in South Australia, Adelaide, South Australian Amateur Swimming Association, 1998.
- Surf life saving in South Australia: a jubilee history : a commissioned history of surf life saving in South Australia, 1952-2002. Adelaide, Surf Life Saving South Australia Inc, 2002.
- From dusty paddock: a history of Trinity College, Gawler 1984-2004, Adelaide, Trinity College, 2004.

== Recognition ==
- 1981 - ACHPER Fellowship
- 1991 - Medal of the Order of Australia (OAM) in recognition of service to the sport of athletics
- 1993 - Athletics Australia Honorary Life Member
- 1993 - Elected as a Corresponding Fellow in the prestigious National Academy of Kinesiology, USA (formerly the American Academy of Physical Education, and before that the American Academy of Physical Education.
- South Australian Olympic Committee Order of Merit
