= John O'Neill (businessman) =

Australian sporting administrator

John O'Neill AO
- Born: John Anthony O'Neill; 1951 (age 74–75); Sydney, New South Wales, Australia
- Education: University of Sydney
- Occupation: Businessman
- Organization(s): State Bank of New South Wales; Australian Rugby Union; Football Federation Australia; Star Entertainment Group

John Anthony O'Neill AO (born 1951) is an Australian sporting administrator and businessman. He has been involved with both rugby union and soccer at the national level, after being Managing Director of the State Bank of New South Wales up until 1995.

Former CEO of the Australian Rugby Union and instrumental in staging the 2003 Rugby World Cup, in 2004, O'Neill was appointed head of the newly created Football Federation Australia by chairman Frank Lowy, a position he remained in until 7 November 2006. He then returned to his former position as CEO of the ARU.

== ARU chief executive - 1995-2003 ==
O'Neill held the position as chief executive of Australian Rugby Union between 1995 and 2003.

The 2003 Rugby World Cup was originally scheduled to be hosted by Australia and New Zealand. However, in April 2002, the International Rugby Board decided that Australia would be the sole host of the tournament after the Australian Rugby Union (ARU), led by O'Neill, made a proposal to that effect. Upon visiting New Zealand, with the country upset with this decision, O'Neill described himself as "surprisingly well recognised" and that he "walked through the crowd at Eden Park at one point and that was an adventure. I used that old Paul Keating bit of advice 'don't make eye contact'." He said further that he is "probably a better known face there [in New Zealand] than I am here [in Australia], which is terrifying."

Prior to the 2003 Rugby World Cup, after the International Rugby Board decided that "no formal musical performance will be permitted other than the playing of the national anthems", O'Neill described the decision not to allow the singing of "Waltzing Matilda" as a "half-pregnant situation where you can sing it but not when the players are on the paddock." He attracted much media attention with the statement, even starting a media campaign which included Sally Loane and Alan Jones. John Howard even suggested that "it's ridiculous".

O'Neill was credited with the successful organisation of the 2003 Rugby Union World Cup which made the ARU a profit of over $30 million. O'Neill was named Sport Executive of the Year 2003. O'Neill left the ARU just after the World Cup. ending his contract a year early. He was described as "flamboyant" by Tim Glover, a journalist.

In December 2003, O'Neill announced that he would not seek a renewal of his contract with the ARU. Andrew Stevenson, a journalist for the Sydney Morning Herald's Rugby Union website 'Rugby Heaven', described the decision as having been reached at a board meeting with the ARU.

O'Neill "decided to move on earlier", as the rugby.com.au website described it, from the ARU in January 2004, instead of the end of his contract in December 2004. O'Neill described his decision thus "I said during the Tournament that I would take a family holiday and think about my future over the Christmas, New Year period. Since then, I have had the chance to reflect on the Tournament and its acclaimed success and my eight fruitful years at the helm and have decided that now is the best time for Australian Rugby (Union) and me to move on with Rugby (Union) at such a high point."

Bob Tuckey, chairman of the ARU said "On behalf of the Board I would like to thank John for the outstanding contribution he has made to Rugby (Union). We have just staged the best ever Rugby (Union) World Cup and John will leave the game with a much enhanced profile and a significant supporter base." O'Neill himself said "The Board and I have accordingly agreed to bring forward my departure. The ARU and Rugby are in great shape with excellent people and a very bright future."

In 2004, he defended the ARU over an argument between it and the New South Wales Rugby Union over rugby league footballer Andrew Johns.

Journalist Spiro Zavos wrote in his weekly column with the Sydney Morning Herald arguing for the return of John O'Neill to the ARU in 2006.

== Soccer - 2003-2006 ==
Within a week of leaving the ARU, the newly formed Australian Soccer Association (ASA) - now known as Football Australia - appointed O'Neill as its chief executive officer to help restructure the country's soccer governance. O'Neill's arrival came in the wake of the 2003 Crawford Report, which recommended the dissolution of previous governing body, Soccer Australia, and the National Soccer League (NSL). Soccer Australia had debts of over A$16 million a year and the NSL had an average attendance of little more than 4,000. Successful businessman Frank Lowy became ASA chairman and had the task of creating a new national football competition, tentatively named the Australian Premier League. One of O'Neill's early moves was to change the name of the organisation to Football Federation Australia (FFA) in order to align the organisation with its international counterparts. O'Neill and Lowy assumed roles in soccer with a view to achieve three central objectives; move Australia from the Oceania Football Confederation (OFC) to the Asian Football Confederation (AFC), establish a new national league, and qualify for the 2006 FIFA World Cup.

O'Neill and Lowy were instrumental in creating a much higher profile for Australian soccer. O'Neill oversaw the introduction of the A-League which reduced the number of teams in the national competition to eight, representing the economically sound regions of Sydney, Melbourne, Brisbane, Perth, Adelaide, Newcastle, New Zealand and the Central Coast of New South Wales. The first year of the A-League saw the competition average over 10,000 per game and the grand final sold out at Sydney Football Stadium in Sydney.

Nationally, O'Neill had guaranteed Australia coach Frank Farina's job to the World Cup, but after a poor Confederations Cup campaign he sacked Farina and was instrumental in securing Guus Hiddink as the national team coach. Under Hiddink's guidance, Australia exceeded expectations through qualifying for the 2006 FIFA World Cup, eventually claiming a Round of 16 finish at the tournament. Australia was knocked out after a controversial loss to Italy, the eventual champions. The Socceroos have qualified for every FIFA World Cup since.

On 29 August 2006, O'Neill announced his decision not to seek a renewal of his contract, which was expiring in the following March. This was despite the fact that less than two years earlier he had said "I would not want to leave unfinished business, so I would be looking at least five years". Citing personal reasons for his decision to step down, despite rumours in the media that there was tension between O'Neill and Lowy, he described his involvement with soccer as "an exhilarating ride and while we’ve achieved so much, the potential to take the game even further is enormous". FFA chairman Frank Lowy said "John established the foundation for 'New Football' and he's achieved tremendous success during the past three years,". O'Neill was eventually replaced by Australian Businessman and former Australian rules footballer Ben Buckley.

== ARU chief executive - 2007 - 2013 ==
In 2007, O'Neill was appointed Australian Rugby Union Managing Director and CEO.

It was reported that in 2010 O'Neill proposed structural changes about how the game was governed and financially managed after reporting on the precarious financial state of the game to the Board (in the three years he had spent at the Football Federation Australia, the ARU had $18 million less than when he had left). He advised the board to follow the centralised model of New Zealand, where head office would control 'players' performance, coaching and medical science across all Wallabies and Super Rugby teams' in Australia, although agreed by the board initially, six weeks later they retracted the plan due to criticism from the major states (NSW, Victoria and Queensland). The centralised model has shown great success for New Zealand since adoption with back to back world cup wins and multiple Super Rugby titles (Crusaders, Highlanders, Chiefs and Hurricanes).

On 31 October 2012 O'Neill left his positions in Australian Rugby. ARU Chairman Michael Hawker said under O’Neill's leadership: "Qantas Wallabies have improved from fifth in the world when John returned to the game in 2007 to now second behind the All Blacks, participation levels are at an all-time high, and the ARU has strengthened its financial position."

He remained a Rugby World Cup board member in a personal capacity until 2016.

== Corporate directorships ==
O'Neill has held non-executive directorships on a number of public company boards. He was a director of Tabcorp and Amalgamated Holdings and chairman of Events New South Wales, Star Entertainment Group and Queensland Airports.

== Recognition ==
- 2002, 2003 - Australian Sport Awards Sport Executive of the Year
- 2004 - Officer of the Order of Australia for service to rugby as an administrator, to the financial services sector, and to the community through educational and charitable organisations.
- 2005 - Awarded the French decoration of the Chevalier de la Legion d’Honne. for "the important role he has played in the fostering of relations between France and Australia, particularly in the field of sport".
- 2015 - Sport Australia Hall of Fame general member inductee.

Preceded by Gary Flowers	Australian Rugby Union CEO; 2007–2013	Succeeded by Bill Pulver
Preceded by Bob Fordham	Australian Rugby Union CEO; 1995–2003	Succeeded by Matt Carroll
