= Cameron Crombie =

Australian Paralympic athlete (born 1986)

Personal information
- Nationality: Australian
- Born: 14 February 1986 (age 40) Newcastle, New South Wales

Sport
- Country: Australia
- Sport: Athletics
- Events: Shot Put, Javelin
- Coached by: Hamish MacDonald

Achievements and titles
- Highest world ranking: 1
Medal record
Men's para athletics
Representing Australia
World Para Athletics Championships
Gold medal – first place	2017 London	Shot put F38
Gold medal – first place	2019 Dubai	Shot put F38
Commonwealth Games
Gold medal – first place	2018 Gold Coast	Shot put F38

Cameron Crombie (born 14 February 1986) is an Australian Para-Athlete who specialises in the shot put and javelin throw events. At his first major international competition, he won the gold medal in the Men's Shot Put F38 classification at the 2017 World Para Athletics Championships in London. England.

== Personal ==
Crombie is the eldest of twin boys and was born on 14 February 1986 in Newcastle, New South Wales. He has hemiplegia (left side) because of a stroke during premature birth. His family managed to keep this from him until his diagnosis was revealed when he was 16 years of age.

Crombie completed a bachelor's degree in Economics at University of Newcastle, and moved to Canberra where he now lives. While pursuing a sporting career, he works full-time as a Project Manager and company Director, and a has been a volunteer firefighter with the Molonglo Brigade of the ACT Rural Fire Service since 2013.

== Sport ==
Prior to taking up athletics, Crombie was involved with basketball from a young age and came up through the Junior representative levels with the Newcastle Hunters and eventually went on to play at a state level as a 16 year old.

In 2015, Crombie was introduced to para-sport, and became a National para-rowing champion by winning the men's single scull, mixed double scull (with Kathleen Murdoch) and the mixed coxed four in the LTA category, and was provisionally selected to represent Australia in the 2015 World Rowing Championships. Unfortunately, ongoing debate around classification and eligibility within rowing meant he did not compete.

== Athletics ==
In 2015 Crombie transferred to para-athletics where he was immediately internationally classified as F38 (re-confirmed in 2019). He is coached by Paralympic gold medalist Hamish MacDonald and continues to train in Canberra.

In his first major international para-athletics competition, he won the gold medal in the F38 Men's Shot Put with a world record throw of 15.95 m to smash the previous record mark by 37 cm. He also competed in the F38 Men's Javelin Throw, where he finished in 5th place with a throw that increased his personal best by over 3.5m.

Crombie represented his country for a second time, competing at the 2018 Commonwealth Games on the Gold Coast, Australia. Here he competed in the F38 Men's Shot put alongside fellow Australians Martin Jackson and Jayden Sawyer. Crombie finished with a best throw of 15.74m, ahead of Jackson, who took the silver medal with 13.74m.

In May 2019, Crombie, Sawyer and fellow athletes James Turner and Deon Kenzie were selected to represent Australia at the upcoming 2019 World Para Athletics Championships to be held in Dubai, United Arab Emirates, with the remainder of the team to be named in September, 2019.

At the 2019 World Para Athletics Championships in Dubai, he repeated his success at the 2017 Championships by winning the gold medal in the Men's Shot Put F38 with a throw of 15.73m.

== Achievements ==
Year	Competition	Venue	Event	Position	Notes
Representing Australia
2017	World Para Athletics Championships	London, England	Shot put	1st	15.95m (WR)
2017	World Para Athletics Championships	London, England	Javelin	5th	47.84m
2018	Commonwealth Games	Gold Coast, Australia	Shot put	1st	15.74m
2019	World Para Athletics Championships	Dubai, UAE	Shot put	1st	15.73m
2019	World Para Athletics Championships	Dubai, UAE	Javelin	7th	45.87m
2023	World Para Athletics Championships	Paris, France	Shot put	4th	15.89m
2023	World Para Athletics Championships	Paris, France	Long Jump	9th	5.28m
2025	World Para Athletics Championships	New Delhi, India	Shot put	4th	15.91m

== Recognition ==
- 2017 Canberra Sport Awards - The People's Sporting Champion.
- 2017-18 Athletics ACT - Male Senior Athlete of the Year
- 2017-18 Athletics ACT - Para Athlete of the Year
- 2019-20 Athletics ACT - Male Senior Athlete of the Year
