= Athletics at the 2018 Commonwealth Games – Men's shot put (F38) =

Men's shot put (F38) at the 2018 Commonwealth Games
- Venue: Carrara Stadium
- Dates: 11 April
- Competitors: 8 from 4 nations
- Winning distance: 15.74 m

Medalists
gold medal	Cameron Crombie	Australia
silver medal	Marty Jackson	Australia
bronze medal	Reinhardt Hamman	South Africa

The men's shot put (F38) at the 2018 Commonwealth Games, as part of the athletics programme, took place in the Carrara Stadium on 11 April 2018. The event was open to para-sport athletes competing under the F37 / F38 classifications.

== Records ==
Prior to this competition, the existing world records were as follows:

World record	Xia Dong (CHN)	17.52 m (F37)	London, United Kingdom	5 September 2012
World record	Cameron Crombie (AUS)	15.95 m (F38)	London, United Kingdom	14 July 2017

== Schedule ==
The schedule was as follows:

Date	Time	Round
Wednesday 11 April 2018	20:36	Final

All times are Australian Eastern Standard Time (UTC+10)

== Results ==
With eight entrants, the event was held as a straight final.

=== Final ===
Rank	Name	Sport Class	#1	#2	#3	#4	#5	#6	Result	Notes
1st place, gold medalist(s)	Cameron Crombie (AUS)	F38	15.56	15.37	15.74	15.67	15.18	14.50	15.74	
2nd place, silver medalist(s)	Marty Jackson (AUS)	F38	13.29	13.10	12.74	13.12	13.40	13.74	13.74	SB
3rd place, bronze medalist(s)	Reinhardt Hamman (RSA)	F38	12.96	12.87	12.92	13.15	12.71	12.69	13.15	SB
4	Jayden Sawyer (AUS)	F38	12.29	x	12.40	11.28	11.71	12.10	12.40	
5	Joshua Bain (ENG)	F37	11.57	11.87	11.69	12.31	11.51	12.07	12.31	
6	David Bambrick (CAN)	F37	11.22	11.74	11.24	11.45	11.24	x	11.74	SB
7	Kevin Strybosch (CAN)	F37	11.17	x	11.15	x	x	x	11.17	SB
8	Juanre Jenkinson (RSA)	F38	9.10	9.40	9.31	9.63	9.01	9.15	9.63	
