= Jill McIntosh =

Australian netball player and coach

Personal information
- Full name: Jill McIntosh
- Born: 21 April 1955 (age 71) Perth, Western Australia
- Relative: Merv McIntosh (father)

Netball career
- Playing positions: WA, C, GD
Years	Club team	Apps
1970s	Jay Dees Club	
1970s	City of Perth	
1970s	South	
1970s	Belmont (Belmont)	
1970s	Independents	
1980s	Bull Creek (Bull Creek)	
1987–1989	Coastal Raiders	
1973–1986	Western Australia	
Years	National team	Caps
1981–1986	Australia	29
Coaching career
- Years: Team
- 1995–2003: Australia
- 2009: Singapore
- 2012: Northern Ireland
Medal record
Representing Australia
World Netball Championships
Gold medal – first place	1983 Singapore	Team

Jill McIntosh is a former Australia netball international and national team head coach. As a player, McIntosh was a member of the Australia team that won the gold medal at the 1983 World Netball Championships. She later coached Australia at the 1995 and 1999 World Netball Championships and at the 1998 and 2002 Commonwealth Games, guiding the team to four gold medals. In 2009 she was inducted into the Australian Netball Hall of Fame. McIntosh subsequently worked as a coach with the International Netball Federation, Central Pulse and with the national teams of Singapore, Northern Ireland and Jamaica.

== Early life and family ==
McIntosh is originally from Perth, Western Australia. She is the daughter of Betty and Merv McIntosh. Her father played Australian rules football for Perth during the 1940s and early 1950s. She has six siblings. As well as playing netball, in her youth McIntosh also represented Western Australia at the Australian Swimming Championships, winning medals at butterfly and medley events.

== Playing career ==
=== Clubs ===
While still in school, McIntosh began playing netball with the Jay Dees Club. Her coaching career began at 15 when, after her team found themselves without a coach, she stepped in and began to lead them. Throughout her playing career she continued to coach the teams she played for. The main club she played for and coached was Bull Creek Netball Club. In 1989, McIntosh was a member of the Coastal Raiders team that won the inaugural West Australian Netball League title.

=== Western Australia ===
McIntosh was just 14 when she first represented Western Australia at schoolgirl level in 1969. She then graduated to the under–18 team two years later. Between 1973 and 1986, she was a regular member of the senior Western Australia team that played in the Australian National Netball Championships. The last seven of these seasons she served as captain-coach.

=== Australia ===
Between 1981 and 1986, McIntosh made 29 senior appearances for Australia. She made her senior debut on 23 June 1981. In 1981 she was named the New Idea Australian Netballer of the Year and in 1982 she captained Australia. McIntosh was also a member of the Australia team that won the gold medal at the 1983 World Netball Championships.

Tournaments	Place
1983 World Netball Championships	1st place, gold medalist(s)

== Coaching career ==
=== Australia ===
In 1990, McIntosh was appointed head coach of the Australia under-21 team. As a result, she also became a coach with the Australian Institute of Sport, working with Wilma Shakespear and Gaye Teede. She also relocated to Canberra. In 1991, she became Netball Australia's national coaching director, a role which focused on coach education around Australia. Between 1995 and 2003, McIntosh served as head coach of Australia. During her 94 Tests in charge she guided Australia to 88 victories, achieving a 94% win rate. During this time she guided the team to four gold medals at the 1995 and 1999 World Netball Championships and at the 1998 and 2002 Commonwealth Games.

Tournaments	Place
1992 World Youth Netball Championships	2nd place, silver medalist(s)
1995 World Netball Championships	1st place, gold medalist(s)
1998 Commonwealth Games	1st place, gold medalist(s)
1999 World Netball Championships	1st place, gold medalist(s)
2002 Commonwealth Games	1st place, gold medalist(s)
2003 World Netball Championships	2nd place, silver medalist(s)

=== INF ===
Since 2005, McIntosh has worked as a coach with the International Netball Federation, focusing on coach education and development of coaches internationally. She has helped host International Coaching Seminars at both the 2011 and 2015 Netball World Cups.

=== Central Pulse ===
In July 2007, McIntosh was appointed director of coaching for Central Pulse as they prepared to make their debut in the 2008 ANZ Championship.

=== Singapore ===
In 2009, McIntosh, served as head coach of Singapore at the Netball Singapore Nations Cup. She had worked as an advisor to Netball Singapore since 2004. At the 2011 World Netball Championships she again worked with Singapore as a technical consultant.

=== Jamaica ===
Between 2011 and 2015, McIntosh also served three times as a technical director worked with Jamaica. She was a member of Jamaica's coaching team at both the 2014 Commonwealth Games and 2015 Netball World Cup.

=== Northern Ireland ===
In May 2012, McIntosh served as head coach of Northern Ireland at the European Netball Championship, guiding them to a silver medal. In July 2012, she was also in charge of Northern Ireland during a three match away series against South Africa.

== Jill McIntosh Medal ==
Since 1994, the West Australian Netball League's Best and fairest player has been awarded the Jill McIntosh Medal. Past winners have included Susan Fuhrmann, Ama Agbeze,Andrea Gilmore, Olivia Lewis, Donnell Wallam, Ruth Aryang and Caitlyn Brown who is the only three-time medallist.

== Honours ==
=== Player ===
Australia

- World Netball Championships
  - Winners: 1983

=== Head coach ===
Australia

- World Netball Championships
  - Winners: 1995, 1999
  - Runner up: 2003
- Commonwealth Games
  - Winners: 1998, 2002

Northern Ireland

- European Netball Championship
  - Runner up: 2012

=== Individual awards ===
Year	Award
1981	New Idea Australian Netballer of the Year
1993	Western Australian Hall of Champions
1998	Australian Sport Awards – Coach of the Year
1998	Australian Coach Awards – Female Team Coach of the Year
1999	Australian Coach Awards – Female Team Coach of the Year
1999	Canberra Sport Awards – Coach of the Year
2000	Australian Sports Medal
2001	Centenary Medal
2006	Netball Australia Service Award
2009	Australian Netball Hall of Fame
2013	INF Service Award
2020	Sport Australia Hall of Fame
2026	ACT Sport Hall of Fame
