= Canberra Sport Awards =

Canberra Sport Awards or CBR Sport Awards were originally established in 1984 by the Board of ACT Sports House. From 1984 to 2014 they were referred to as ACT Sportstar of the Year Awards and organised by ACTSPORT. The ACT Government took over the Awards after ACTSPORT ceased operations in 2015 and renamed them Canberra Sport Awards. There were no Awards in 2015 due to the transition from ACTSPORT to ACT Government.

Inductions to the ACT Sport Hall of Fame are part of the annual Awards.

== Major Awards 1984- ==
Several Awards - overall athlete and coach were not continued in Canberra Sport Awards. Rising Star replaces Junior Athlete.

Year	Overall 1984-2014	Male Athlete / Men's Sport	Female Athlete / Women's Sport	Junior 1984-2014 / Rising Star 2018	Coach 1994-2014	Team
1984	Robert de Castella; Athletics	Phil Smyth; Basketball	Sue Cook; Athletics	No award	No award	Canberra Cannons; Basketball
1985	David Campese; Rugby union	David Campese; Rugby union	Robyn Lorraway; Athletics	No award	No award	Mercedes IV Sailing Team
1986	Robert de Castella; Athletics	Rob de Castella; Athletics	Jeanette Baker-Finch; Tenpin bowling	No award	No award	Canberra Costain Cats; Australian football
1987	Canberra Raiders; Rugby league	Wally Masur; Tennis	Jenny Bourne; Orienteering	No award	No award	Canberra Raiders; Rugby league
1988	Loretta Dorman; Hockey	Phil Smyth; Basketball	Loretta Dorman; Hockey	No award	No award	Canberra Cannons; Basketball
1989	Bradley Clyde; Rugby league	Bradley Clyde; Rugby league	Ballanda Sack; Rowing	Anne Minns; Athletics	No award	Canberra Raiders; Rugby league
1990	Jane Flemming; Athletics	Andrew Lloyd; Athletics	Lisa-Marie Vizaniari; Athletics	Anne Minns; Athletics	No award	Canberra Raiders; Rugby league
1991	Bruce Hick; Rowing	Bruce Hick; Rowing	Julie Young	Robert Neill; Australian football	No award	Canberra Raiders; Rugby league
1992	George Snow; Yachting	George Snow; Yachting	Liz Moller; Rowing	Angela Kennedy; Swimming	No award	Weston Creek Women's Soccer Team
1993	Ricky Stuart; Rugby league	Ricky Stuart; Rugby league	Sharon Stekelenburg Water skiing	Ben Ellwood; Tennis	No award	ACT U/15 Rugby League Team
1994	Deane Rogers; Cycling	John Pennay Water skiing	Sharon Stekelenburg; Water skiing	Deane Rogers; Cycling	Tim Sheens; Rugby league	Canberra Raiders; Rugby league
1995	Megan Still; Rowing	Neil Bates; Motor rallying	Megan Still; Rowing	Annabel Ellwood; Tennis	Geoff Stokes; Rugby union	Canberra Kookaburras; Rugby union
1996	Megan Still; Rowing	Bruce Hick; Rowing	Megan Still; Rowing	Stuart Boswell; Squash	Brett Flanigan; Basketball	Canberra Cannons; Basketball
1997	Neil Stephens; Cycling	Neil Stephens; Cycling	Lisa Llorens; Paralympic athletics	Michael Rogers; Cycling	Rod MacQueen; Rugby union	ACT Brumbies; Rugby union
1998	Stephen Larkham; Rugby union	Stephen Larkham; Rugby union	Sharon Dodgson; Water skiing	Alison Wright; Cycling	Sue Donoghue; Rowing	ACT U/21 Women's Volleyball Team
1999	Michael York; Hockey	Michael York; Hockey	Tracey Gaudry; Cycling	Troy de Haas; Orienteering	Jill McIntosh; Netball	ACT Bowls Team
2000	Lauren Jackson; Basketball	Stirling Mortlock; Rugby union	Lauren Jackson; Basketball	Siobhan Paton; Paralympic swimming	Carrie Graf; Basketball	Canberra Capitals; Basketball
2001	Petria Thomas; Swimming	George Smith; Rugby union	Petria Thomas; Swimming	Kial Stewart; Cycling	Eddie Jones; Rugby union	ACT Brumbies; Rugby union
2002	Michael Milton; Paralympic skiing	Michael Milton; Paralympic skiing	Lauren Jackson; Basketball	James Meadley; Cycling	Warren McDonald; Cycling	Canberra Capitals; Basketball
2003	Lauren Jackson; Basketball	Michael Rogers; Cycling	Lauren Jackson; Basketball	Jessie MacLean; Cycling	Bob Harrow; Softball	Canberra Capitals; Basketball
2004	Petria Thomas; Swimming	Michael Rogers; Cycling	Petria Thomas; Swimming	Adam Folkard; Softball	David Nucifora; Rugby union	ACT Brumbies; Rugby union
2005	Michael Rogers; Cycling	Michael Rogers; Cycling	Oenone Wood; Cycling	Lauren Boden; Athletics	Lindsey Carroll; Softball	ACT Bowls Team
2006	Lauren Jackson; Basketball	Michael Rogers; Cycling	Lauren Jackson; Basketball	Dan Ellis; Cycling	Carrie Graf; Basketball	Canberra Capitals; Basketball
2007	Carrie Graf; Basketball	Andrew Kirkpatrick; Softball	Oenone Wood; Cycling	Tom Palmer; Cycling	Carrie Graf; Basketball	Canberra Capitals; Basketball
2008	Tully Bevilaqua; Basketball	Adam Pine; Swimming	Michelle Wu; Triathlon	Tom Palmer Cycling; Caroline Buchanan; Cycling	Norma Plummer; Netball	ACT Open Men's Softball
2009	Adam Folkard; Softball	Adam Folkard; Softball	Christine Wolf; Paralympic athletics	Melissa Breen; Athletics	Bob Harrow; Softball	Canberra Capitals; Basketball
2010	Caroline Buchanan; Cycling	Michael Rogers; Cycling	Caroline Buchanan; Cycling	Edward Bissaker Cycling; Mitchell Lovelock-Fay Cycling	Carrie Graf; Basketball	Canberra Capitals; Basketball
2011	Susan Powell; Cycling	Andrew Kirkpatrick; Softball	Susan Powell; Cycling	Allison Rice; Cycling	Bob Harrow; Softball	Ice Dragons Dragon Boats
2012	Susan Powell; Cycling	Patrick Mills; Basketball	Susan Powell; Cycling	Nick Kyrgios; Tennis	Jikta Klimovski; Football	Canberra United FC; Football
2013	Nick Kyrgios; Tennis	Michael Matthews; Cycling	Caroline Buchanan; Cycling	Nick Kyrgios; Tennis	Michael Collins; Baseball	ACT Open Men's Softball Team
2014	Caroline Buchanan Cycling; Susan Powell Cycling	Michael Matthews; Cycling	Caroline Buchanan Cycling; Susan Powell Cycling	Alexandria Nicholls; Cycling	Michael Collins; Baseball	Canberra Cavalry; Baseball
2015	No awards					
2016	discontinued	Patrick Mills; Basketball	Kim Brennan; Rowing	Not awarded	discontinued	Canberra Raiders; Rugby league
2017	discontinued	Michael Matthews; Cycling	Caroline Buchanan; Cycling	Not awarded	discontinued	ACT Schoolboys Rugby Union
2018	discontinued	Nick Kyrgios; Tennis	Chloe Hosking; Cycling	Keeley Small; Athletics	discontinued	Canberra Brave; Ice hockey
2019	discontinued	Nathan Lyon; Cricket	Kelsey-Lee Barber; Athletics	Kye A'Hern Mountain Bike; Karly Roestbakken (Football)	discontinued	Canberra Capitals Basketball
2020	discontinued	Jack Wighton; Rugby league	Laura Peel; Aerial skiing	Chloe Bateup; Triathlon	discontinued	Canberra Capitals; ACT Brumbies
2021	discontinued	Patty Mills; Basketball	Laura Peel; Aerial skiing	Jade Melbourne; Basketball	discontinued	Olympic Rowing Men’s Quadruple Scull (Rowing)
2022	discontinued	Michael Matthews; Cycling	Kelsey-Lee Barber; Athletics	Alex Toohey; Basketball	discontinued	Canberra Brave
2023	discontinued	Jay Vine; Cycling	Nikki Ayers; Rowing	Cameron Myers; Athletics	discontinued	Canberra Heat Volleyball Club (Men)
2024	discontinued	Jay Vine; Cycling	Jade Melbourne basketball	Cameron Myers; Athletics	discontinued	Canberra Brave
2025	discontinued	Jay Vine; Cycling	Laura Peel; Aerial skiing	Christopher Jackson; Archery	discontinued	Canberra Raiders

== Awards 2016- ==
Awards established for Canberra Sports Awards.

Year	Athlete of the Year – Para Sport	Outstanding Service to Sport	Ministers Award Event Excellence:	Ministers Award Innovation	Ministers Award Inclusion	People's Sporting Champion
2016	Susan Powell; Paralympic cycling	Steve Dodt; Athletics	Tennis ACT	Ginninderra Athletics Club	Woden Valley Gymnastics	Jarrod Croker; Rugby league
2017	Jayden Sawyer; Paralympic athletics	Carmel Weatherburn; Netball	Capital Football	Canberra/Broulee Nippers Club	Canberra Regional Rugby League	Cameron Crombie; Paralympic athletics
2018	Emily Tapp; Para-triathlon	Robyne Houston; Netball	Uni-Norths Junior Rugby Union Club	Tennis ACT	Capital Lakes Rowing Club	Emma Housden; Softball
2019	Kathryn Ross; Para-rowing	Peter Boden Athletics; Brian Golledge Football; Marie Hart Indoor Cricket	Dragon Boat ACT for Australian championships	Triathlon ACT for young women leadership program	Royal Life Saving ACT for Swim My Way	Lauren Boden Athletics
2020	Vanessa Low; Para-athletics	Nick Hunter Rowing; Lorraine Wuth Swimming; Rosanna Horn Table Tennis	Not awarded	Orienteering ACT for COVID return to play	Gungahlin Jets Netball Club for the Jets Shooting Stars	Discontinued
2021	James Turner; Para-athletics	Trudy Fajri (AFL); Carl Ruhen (Boxing); Sanjay Sharma (Cricket)	Table Tennis ACT for the 2020 ACT Open	Little Athletics ACT for Online Participation Program	Canberra Region Rugby League for Canberra Region Wheelchair Rugby League	Discontinued
2022	Sam Harding; Triathlon	Gary Green (Rugby League); Gillian Styles (Dragon Boating); Paul Smith (Archery)	Stromlo Running Festival	Canberra Raiders ‘Score Raiders’	Manuka Tennis Club; Sustainability Initiative	Discontinued
2023	Nikki Ayers; Para-rowing	Not awarded	Cricket ACT; Festival of Cricket	Capital Athletics; Unification of Athletics in the ACT	Hockey ACT; Pride in Sport Program	Discontinued
2024	James Turner; Para-athletics	Not awarded	Softball ACT; 2024 Gilley’s Shield	Not awarded	Bowls ACT; Graded Reserve Open Gender Championships	Discontinued
2025	James Turner; Para-athletics	Not awarded	Canberra Brave; 2025 AIHL home season	Pink Tennis; LGBTQI+ Initiatives	Rowing ACT; Digital optimisation of regattas	Discontinued

== Discontinued Awards ==
These ACTSPORT Awards have not been continued by the Canberra Sports Awards. The AIS Award was selected from athletes on scholarship at the Australian Institute of Sport campus in Canberra. In 2014, there was no AIS Award as the AIS no longer offered athlete scholarships. In its place, the Harry Marr Award was created and Patrick Millss was its inaugural and only recipient.

Year	AIS ACT Athlete 1984-2013	Masters Athlete	Special Achievement 2009-2008 Community Award 2009-2014	Contribution to Sport 1984-2008 Official 2009-2014	Volunteer
1984	Karen Phillips; Swimming	No award	No award	No award	No award
1985	Michelle Pearson; Swimming	No award	No award	No award	No award
1986	James Galloway; Rowing	No award	No award	No award	No award
1987	Kerry Saxby; Athletics	No award	No award	No award	No award
1988	Kerry Saxby; Athletics	No award	No award	No award	No award
1989	Monique Allen; Gymnastics	No award	No award	No award	No award
1990	Jane Flemming; Athletics	No Award	No Award	Harry Marr	No Award
1991	Linley Frame; Swimming	No Award	No Award	Beverly Williams	No Award
1992	Nicole Stevenson; Swimming			Raymond Russell	No Award
1993	Matthew Dunn; Swimming	No Award	No Award	Joan Kellett	No Award
1994	Nicole Stevenson; Swimming	No Award	No Award	Ray Brown	No Award
1995	Megan Still Rowing; Kate Slatter Rowing	No Award	No Award	Peter Anderson	No Award
1996	Megan Still Rowing; Kate Slatter Rowing	No Award	No Award	Richard Cater	No Award
1997	Michael Klim; Swimming	Ken Uren	No Award	Pat Dart	No Award
1998	Michael Klim; Swimming	Ros Balodis	No Award	Graham Carter	No Award
1999	Michael Klim; Swimming	Rob Marshall		Kel O'Neill	No Award
2000	Michael Klim; Swimming	Jenny Bourne	Nicole Wood	Heather Reid	No Award
2001	Nathan Deakes; Athletics	Heather McKay	John Allender	Brenda McConchie	No Award
2002	Petria Thomas; Swimming	os Balodis	Jake McCormick	No Award	No Award
2003	Australian Quad; Rowing	Bob Harrow	Belinda Archer	Jim Roberts	No Award
2004	Petria Thomas; Swimming	Lisa Wilson	Zoe Buckman	Alan Ray	No Award
2005	Oenone Wood; Cycling	Ros Balodis	Dan Ellis	Ron Cahill	No Award
2006	Robert Crowther; Athletics	Ros Balodis	Tom Palmer	Martin Grace	No Award
2007	Nathan Deakes; Athletics	Alison Ide	Ashleigh Craig	Ian Ellis	No Award
2008	Jared Tallent; Athletics	Jackie Fairweather	Queanbeyan Whites Rugby		Chris Timpson
2009	Heath Francis; Paralympic athletics	Michael Aisbett		Tom Ward	Witold Rejilich
2010	Peter Leek; Paralympic swimming	Susan Powell	Ian McDermitt	Lisa Colquhoun	Joan Kellett
2011	Alicia Coutts; Swimming	Janice Banens	Robbie Chesher	Geoff Northam	Angelique Clyde-Smith
2012	Alicia Coutts; Swimming	Ros Balodis	Terry McInness; Scott Ballard	Glen Munday	Mick Pini
2013	Evan O'Hanlon; Paralympic athletics	Martin Fryer	Michael Frost	William Walker	David Bagnall
2014	No Award	Jayne Hardy	Margaret Baccetto	Ben Williams	Franca Jones

Canberra News (1972-1973) and Canberra Times had an annual award called the Sports Star of the Year.

Year	Athlete
1972	Mick Cuthel; Rugby Union
1973	Peter Lang; Motor Rallying
1974	Tony Beaton; Athletics
1975	Sue Gadd; Softball
1976	Graeme Reid; Field Hockey
