= Triathlon at the 2018 Commonwealth Games – Women's PTWC =

Women's PTWC triathlon at the 2018 Commonwealth Games
- Venue: Southport Broadwater Parklands
- Date: 7 April 2018
- Competitors: 6 from 3 nations

Medalists
gold medal	Jade Jones	England
silver medal	Emily Tapp	Australia
bronze medal	Lauren Parker	Australia

The women's PTWC triathlon was part of the Triathlon at the 2018 Commonwealth Games program. The competition was held on 7 April 2018 in the Southport Broadwater Parklands.

== Schedule ==
All times are Australian Eastern Standard Time (UTC+10)

Date	Time	Round
Saturday 7 April 2018	09:31	Race

== Competition format ==
The race was held over the "sprint distance" and consisted of swimming, road bicycling, and road running.

== Results ==
Rank	Triathlete	Nationality	Class	Comp	Swimming	T1	Cycling	T2	Running	Total time	Diff
1st place, gold medalist(s)	Jade Jones	England	PTWC2	3:58	13:10	1:22	38:05	0:53	13:39	1:11:07	-
2nd place, silver medalist(s)	Emily Tapp	Australia	PTWC1	0:00	14:10	2:08	41:14	0:49	14:35	1:12:56	+1:49
3rd place, bronze medalist(s)	Lauren Parker	Australia	PTWC1	0:00	13:31	1:50	38:51	0:58	18:38	1:13:48	+2:41
4	Karen Darke	Scotland	PTWC1	0:00	17:53	1:55	38:56	1:02	16:51	1:16:37	+5:30
5	Lizzie Tench	England	PTWC2	3:58	14:10	2:01	41:58	1:18	16:39	1:20:04	+8:57
6	Sara Tait	Australia	PTWC1	0:00	17:51	1:37	45:22	1:15	17:27	1:23:32	+12:25
