= Australian Institute of Sport Awards =

Annual sports award in Australia

Australian Institute of Sport (AIS) was opened in 1981. AIS Sports Star of the Year (later named AIS Athlete of the Year) was first established in 1983/84 with the first winner being swimmer Karen Phillips. In 1995, AIS Junior Athlete of the Year was established. Other major awards include AIS Team of The Year, AIS Coach of the Year and AIS Program of the Year. Other awards included: Sport Achievement Awards, Vocation Awards and Education Awards. There were several memorial scholarship awards that recognise the contribution of deceased AIS athletes, coaches and administrators - Brent Harding Memorial Award for Swimming, Nathan Meade Memorial Award for Diving, Gary Knoke Memorial Award for Athletics, Darren Smith Memorial Award for Road Cycling, Ben Mitchell Medal for AFL and Bob Staunton Memorial Award for Basketball.

The awards were broadened in 2013 to include Direct Athlete Assistance recipients as well as AIS scholarship holders as part of the AIS Winning Edge Strategy. The awards were renamed the AIS Sport Performance Awards (ASPAs) in 2014 with several new awards - Sport Personality of the Year, Para Performance of the Year, Community Club Award and Volunteer/Administrator Award. In 2019, two awards - Sport Personality of the Year and Sporting Moment of the Year are decided by public vote. There were no awards in 2020 and 2021 due to impact of COVID-19.

== AIS Best of the Best ==
In 2002 as part of the AIS 21st birthday celebrations, 21 athletes were inducted into the AIS 'Best of the Best' hall of Fame. In 2006, four athletes were added and in 2011 another five athletes.

Year	Athletes
2002	Alisa Camplin (Freestyle skiing), Robert De Castella (Athletics), John Eales (Rugby Union), Simon Fairweather (Archery), Neil Fuller (Paralympic Athletics), Bridgette Gusterson (Water Polo), Rechelle Hawkes (Hockey), Shane Kelly (Cycling), Luc Longley (Basketball), Michelle Martin (Squash), Glenn McGrath (Cricket), Michael Klim (Swimming), Michael Milton (Paralympic Skiing), Clint Robinson (Canoeing), Louise Sauvage (Paralympic Athletics), Kate Slatter (Rowing), Zali Steggall (Alpine skiing), Petria Thomas (Swimming), Mark Viduka (Soccer), Vicki Wilson (Netball), Todd Woodbridge (Tennis)
2006	Kerry Saxby-Junna (Athletics), Lauren Jackson (Basketball), Chantelle Newbery (Diving)
2011	Jamie Dwyer (Hockey), Anna Meares (Cycling), Malcolm Page (Sailing), Ricky Ponting (Cricket) and Matthew Cowdrey (Paralympic Swimming)

- Stuart O'Grady was inducted in 2006 but this was indefinitely suspended on 31 July 2013 due to an admission of doping.

== AIS Male Athlete of The Year ==
Year	Athlete
2015	Jason Day (Golf)
2016	Kyle Chalmers (Swimming)
2017	Scotty James (Snowboarding)
2018	Rohan Dennis (Cycling)
2019	Scotty James (Snowboarding)
2020-2021	Not held
2022	Cameron Smith (Golf)
2023	Matthew Wearn (Sailing)
2024	Matthew Wearn (Sailing)

== AIS Female Athlete of the Year ==
Year	Athlete
2015	Emily Seebohm (Swimming)
2016	Kim Brennan (Rowing)
2017	Sally Pearson (Athletics)
2018	Jessica Fox (Slalom canoeing)
2019	Ash Barty (Tennis)
2020-2021	Not held
2022	Jessica Stenson (Athletics)
2023	Kaylee McKeown (Swimming)
2024	Kaylee McKeown (Swimming)

== AIS Emerging Athlete of the Year ==
This award recognises a talented junior athletes performances during the year. Previously AIS Junior Athlete of the Year.

Year	Athlete
1995	World Junior Men's Basketball Silver Medallists - Frank Drimic, Scott McGregor, Phil Doherty, Brad McKinnon
1996	Victoria Roberts (Netball)
1997	Michael Rogers (Cycling)
1998	Lauren Jackson (Basketball)
1999	Lauren Jackson (Basketball); Ben Kersten (Track Cycling); Jobie Dajka (Track Cycling)
2000	Siobhan Paton (Paralympic Swimming)
2001	Luke Schenscher (Basketball)
2002	Todd Reid (Tennis)
2003	David Barnes (Archery)
2004	Tim Cuddihy (Archery)
2005	Renae Camino (Basketball)
2006	Robert Crowther (Athletics)
2007	Gemma Beadsworth (Water Polo)
2008	Evan O'Hanlon (Paralympic Athletics)
2009	Jack Bobridge (Track Cycling); Amy Steel (Netball)
2010	Lauren Mitchell (Gymnastics)
2011	Luke Durbridge (Track Cycling)
2012	Sam Willoughby (BMX Cycling)
2013	Dante Exum (Basketball)
2014	Amy Cure (Track cycling)
2015	Ben Simmons (Basketball)
2016	Curtis Luck (Golf)
2017	Kelland O'Brien (Cycling)
2018	Luke Plapp (Cycling)
2019	Amy Lawton (Hockey)
2020-2021	Not held
2022	Donnell Wallam (Netball)
2023	Alexa Leary (Swimming)
2024	Arisa Trew (Skateboarding)

== AIS Performance of the Year ==
Year	Athlete
2023	Mollie O'Callaghan (Swimming)
2024	Lauren Parker (Para-cycling & Para-triathlon)

== AIS Team of the Year ==
Year	Team
2000	Australian Women's Water Polo Team (Stingers)
2001	Women's Coxless Four (Rowing)- Victoria Roberts, Jane Robinson, Jo Lutz & Julia Wilson
2002	Darren Bundock & John Forbes (Sailing)
2003	Australian Women's Quad Scull (Rowing)- Amber Bradley, Dana Faletic, Kerry Hore, Jane Robinson
2004	Australian Men's Hockey Team (Kookaburras)
2005	Malcolm Page & Nathan Wilmot (Sailing)
2006	Australian Women's Water Polo Team (Stingers)
2007	Malcolm Page & Nathan Wilmot (Sailing)
2008	Nathan Wilmot & Malcolm Page (Sailing); Elise Rechichi & Tessa Parkinson (Sailing)
2009	Nathan Outteridge & Iain Jensen (Sailing)
2010	Australian Men's Hockey Team (Kookaburras)
2011	Women's Team Sprint Team - Anna Meares & Kaarle McCulloch
2012	Men's K4 1000 (Flatwater Canoeing) - Jacob Clear, David Smith, Tate Smith, Murray Stewart
2013	Mathew Belcher & Will Ryan (Sailing)
2014	Australian Men's Hockey Team (Kookaburras)
2015	Australian Diamonds (Netball) and Women's Team Pursuit (Cycling)
2016	Australian Women's Sevens Rugby
2017	Australian Freestyle Skiing and Snowboard (Winter Sport)
2018	Australian Men's Hockey Team (Kookaburras)
2019	Mathew Belcher & Will Ryan (Sailing)
2020-2021	Not held
2022	Australian Women's Sevens Rugby
2023	BC3 Pairs (Daniel Michel and Jamieson Leeson .Boccia Australia
2024	Men’s Team Pursuit at 2024 Parais Olympics; Oliver Bleddyn, Sam Welsford, Conor Leahy, Kelland O'Brien

== AIS Coach of the Year ==
Year	coach
2002	Martin Barras (Track Cycling)
2003	Lyall McCarthy (Rowing)
2004	Martin Barras (Track Cycling)
2005	Lyall McCarthy (Rowing)
2006	Greg McFadden (Women's Water Polo)
2007	Craig Hilliard (Athletics)
2008	Victor Kovalenko (Sailing)
2009	Craig Walton (Triathlon)
2010	Richard Charlesworth (Hockey)
2011	Ben Wordsworth (Snowboarding)
2012	Australian Sailing Team Coaching Group
2013	Simon Cusack (Swimming)
2014	Lisa Alexander (Netball)
2015	Michael Bohl (Swimming)
2016	Michael Blackburn (Sailing)
2017	Alen Stajcic (Soccer)
2018	Myriam Fox-Jerusalmi (Slalom canoeing)
2019	Michael Blackburn (Sailing)
2020-2021	Not held
2022	Peter McNiel and Kate Blamey (Olympic Winter Institute of Australia)
2023	Rohan Taylor (Swimming)
2024	Dean Boxall (Swimming)

== ABC Sport Personality of the Year ==
Voted for by the general public.

Year	Athlete
2014	Kurt Fearnley (Paralympic athletics)
2015	David Pocock (Rugby union)
2016	Chloe Esposito (Modern Pentathlon)
2017	Sam Kerr (Soccer)
2018	Craig Lowndes (Motor sport)
2019	Ash Barty (Tennis)

== Team of the Year ==
Voted for by the general public.

Year	Athlete
2015	Australian Diamonds (Netball)
2016	Western Bulldogs (Australian rules football)
2017	Matildas (Soccer)

No longer awarded

== ABC Best Sporting Moment of The Year ==
Voted for by the media. Previously called Sport Performance of the Year Award.

Year	Athlete
2013	Alex Pullin (Snowboarding)
2014	South Sydney Rabbitohs (Rugby league)
2015	Michelle Payne (Horse racing)
2016	Kyle Chalmers (Swimming)
2017	Jeff Horn (Boxing)
2018	Kurt Fearnley (Para athletics) and para-sport integration at 2018 Commonwealth Games
2019	Ash Barty (Tennis) winning 2019 French Open

== AIS Para Performance of the Year ==
Year	Athlete
2014	Australian Para Rugby Team (Steelers)
2015	Alistair Donohue (Cycling)
2016	Australian Steelers (Wheelchair rugby)
2017	Mitchell Gourley (Alpine skiing)
2018	Simon Patmore (Snowboarding)

Discontinued and replaced by Male and Female Para-athlete of the Year

== Male Para-athlete of the Year ==
Year	Athlete
2019	Curtis McGrath (Para-canoe)
2020-2021	Not held
2022	Ben Tudhope (Para-snowboarding)
2023	James Turner (Athletics)
2024	James Turner (Athletics)

== Female Para-athlete of the Year ==
Year	Athlete
2019	Melissa Perrine (Para-skiing)
2020-2021	Not held
2022	Emily Petricola (Cycling)
2023	Lauren Parker (Cycling and triathlon)
2024	Lauren Parker (Cycling and triathlon)

== High Performance Program of the Year ==
Year	Athlete
2018	Australian Cycling Program
2019	Rowing Australia High Performance Program
2020-2021	Not held
2022	Athletics Australia
2023	The Dolphins, Swimming Australia
2024	Paddle Australia

== AIS Leadership Award ==
Year	Person
2013	Geoff Lipshut Olympic Winter Institute of Australia
2014	Damien Marangon (Shooting) and Kate Palmer (Netball Australia)
2015	Mark Anderson (Swimming Australia)
2016	Kate McLoughlin (Australian Paralympic Committee)
2017	Susan Alberti (Australian rules football)
2018	Craig Phillips (Commonwealth Games Australia)
2019	Lynne Anderson (Paralympics Australia)
2020-2021	Not held
2022	Petria Thomas (Commonwealth Games Australia)
2023	Jessica Corones, Swimming Australia

== Win Well Award ==
Year	Person/Organisation
2022	Victorian Institute of Sport
2023	Archery Australia
2024	Bowls Australia

== Sport Volunteer of the Year ==
Year	Person/Organisation
2022	Nicole Williams (Cricket Australia)
2023	Elysa Oliveri, Cricket Australia
2024	Julie Keillor, Shepparton Canoe Club/Paddle Australia

== Sport Australia Award ==
Award highlighting integrity and sportsmanship in Australian sport.

Year	Person
2018	Celia Sullohern, Madeline Hills, Eloise Wellings who waited at the finish to cheer on the last-placed athlete, Lineo Chaka in the 10000m at 2018 Commonwealth Games, Gold Coast, Queensland
2019	Hockeyroos in match against Belgium

== Athlete Community Engagement Award ==
Year	Person
2019	Jenna O'Hea involved in creating WNBL's “Lifeline Round”
2020-2021	Not held
2022	Kyle Vander-Kuyp
2023	Amy Parmenter, Netball Australia
2024	Serena Bonnell, Bowls Australia

== AIS World's Best Award ==
This award may not be awarded annually.

Year	Person
2014	Ric Charlesworth, Australian Hockey Coach
2016	Gary West, Australian Track Cycling Coach

== AIS Service Award ==
This award may not be awarded annually.

Year	Person
2016	Danielle Woodward (Canoeing)
2017	Glenn Tasker (Swimming/Paralympic sport)
2018	Dick Telford (Sports science / Athletics)
2019	Tim Oberg (parkrun Australia) and Robyn Smith (Sport Inclusion Australia)
2024	Phil Jones, Paddle Australia

== Discontinued Awards ==
=== AIS Athlete of the Year ===
Replaced in 2015 by Male and Female Athletes of the Year.

Year	Athlete
1983/84	Karen Phillips (Swimming)
1984/85	Michele Pearson (Swimming)
1985/86	James Galloway (Rowing)
1986/87	Kerry Saxby (Athletics)
1988/89	Kerry Saxby (Athletics)
1989	Kerry Saxby (Athletics)
1990	Steve McGlede (Track Cycling)
1991	Linley Frame (Swimming)
1992	Clint Robinson (Flatwater Canoeing)
1993	World Junior Female Basketball Team; Men's Track Cycling Pursuit Team
1994	Australian Women's Hockey Team
1995	Shane Kelly (Track cycling)
1996	Megan Still & Kate Slatter (Rowing)
1997	Louise Sauvage (Paralympic Athletics)
1998	Michael Klim (Swimming)
1999	Michael Klim (Swimming)
2000	Simon Fairweather (Archery)
2001	Petria Thomas (Swimming) & Philippe Rizzo (Gymnastics)
2002	Petria Thomas (Swimming)
2003	Nathan Baggaley (Canoeing)
2004	Petria Thomas (Swimming) & Ryan Bayley (Track Cycling)
2005	Peter Robinson (Triathlon) & Robin Bell (Slalom Canoeing)
2006	Philippe Rizzo (Gymnastics)
2007	Nathan Deakes (Athletics) & Anna Meares (Track Cycling)
2008	Ken Wallace (Flatwater canoeing) & Heath Francis (Paralympic Athletics)
2009	Brenton Rickard (Swimming) & Emma Moffatt (Triathlon)
2010	Lydia Lassila (Freestyle Skiing)
2011	Anna Meares (Track cycling)
2012	Alicia Coutts (Swimming) & Tom Slingsby (Sailing)
2013	Caroline Buchanan (Cycling) and Kim Crow (Rowing)
2014	Jessica Fox (Slalom canoeing)

=== AIS Program of the Year ===
Discontinued as AIS no longer operates sports scholarship programs.

Year	coach
2003	AIS Diving
2004	AIS Diving
2005	AIS Triathlon
2006	AIS/South Australia.com Men's U23 Road Cycling
2007	AIS Sailing
2008	Australian/AIS Sailing Team
2009	AIS Under-23 Track Endurance/Road Cycling
2010	AIS Sailing
2011	AIS Track Cycling
2012	Australian Sailing Team Coaching Group

=== AIS Volunteer/Administrator Award ===
Year	Person
2014	Bridie Galea

=== AIS Community Club Award ===
Year	Person
2014	Wynyard Yacht Club

== AIS Award - ACT Sports Star of the Year ==
From 1984 to 2013, ACTSPORT included an AIS Athlete of the Year for athletes on scholarship at the AIS Canberra campus.

== See also ==
- Australian Sport Awards
- Sport Australia Hall of Fame
- ABC Sports Award of the Year
- World Trophy for Australasia
- Sport in Australia
