= Martin Jackson (athlete) =

Australian para-athlete (born 1978)

Marty Jackson
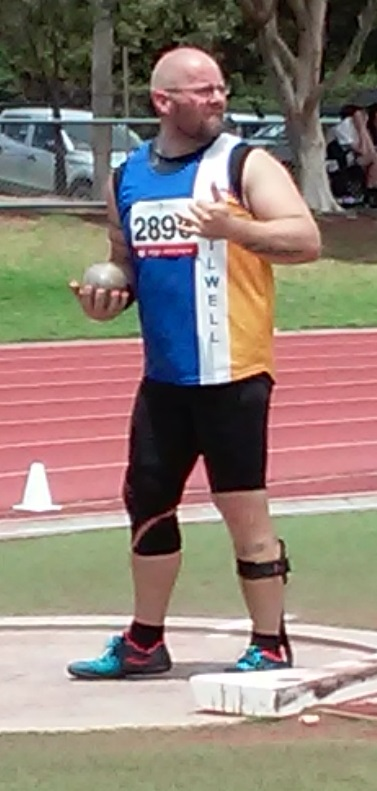
- Jackson in 2017

Personal information
- Full name: Marty Jackson
- Nickname: Nastee
- Nationality: Australian
- Born: Martin Jackson; 18 February 1978 (age 48) Geelong, Australia
- Height: 1.75
- Weight: 109 kg (240 lb)

Sport
- Country: Australia
- Sport: Paralympic athletics
- Event: Shot Put
- Club: Athletics Chilwell
- Coached by: John Eden

Achievements and titles
- Personal best: 15.46m (Shot Put)
Medal record
Track and field
World Para Athletics Championships
Bronze medal – third place	2019 Dubai	Men's shot put F38
Commonwealth Games
Silver medal – second place	2018 Gold Coast	Shot put F38

Martin Jackson, also known as Marty Jackson (born 18 February 1978) is an Australian Paralympic athletics (shot put athlete) and para ice hockey player.

== Personal life ==
Jackson is a qualified level 5 Arborist. Jackson idolizes Denmark's F44 Shot Put Thrower Jackie Christiansen. He practices his strength and conditioning at Anytime Fitness in Geelong, Elite Training Centre, Geelong and the Geelong Cats High Performance Centre

== Grid Iron ==
Jackson played Gridiron for Geelong club Geelong Buccaneers and had representative honours with Victoria in 2010 and 2012. He was also inducted into the Geelong Buccaneers ‘Ring of Champions’ in recognition for his hard nosed style of play on the gridiron field. Jackson was also the first to be granted Life Membership to the Geelong Buccaneers. Whilst playing, he sustained an injury during a misguided tackle, which caused a knee dislocation. It led to sensory ataxia/loss of proprioception and partial paralysis lower left leg.

== Athletics ==
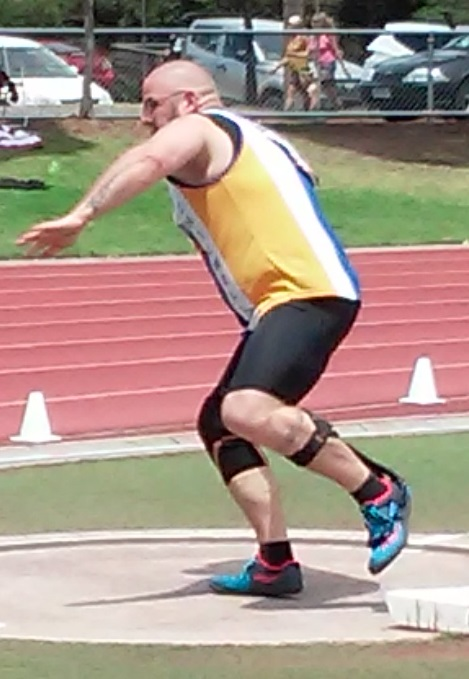
Jackson at John Landy Athletics Field in December 2017.

=== 2014 ===
He commenced Track-and-Field Athletics in 2014. He took up throwing events such as discus, shot put and javelin.

=== 2016 ===
In 2016, he represented Australia at the Oceania Melanesian Regional Athletics Championships in Fiji.

Jackson named team Captain of Australian Athletics team - Oceania Melanesian Regional Athletics Championships

Jackson wins Gold in Ambulant Shot put - Oceania Melanesian Regional Athletics Championships.

On 5 December 2016, the Geelong Advertiser announced that Jackson had won the Barwon Sports Academy Lee Troop Award for 2016.

=== 2017 ===
On 8 June 2017, the Geelong Advertiser announced that Marty Jackson was selected represent Australia at the World Para-Athletics Championships in London.

Jackson competed in the F38 classified Shot Put event at the 2017 World Para Athletics Championships. He competed in the event alongside compatriot Cameron Crombie, Iran's Javad Hardani and Sweden's Victor Svanesohn, finishing in 4th place behind the three of them with a throw of 13.31 metres. Jackson was one of three Geelong Para Athletes, as well as Sam McIntosh and Jemima Moore, to be selected for the Championships.

On 7 October 2017, Jackson increased his Personal Best from 13.47m to 13.49m during a regional competition in at John Landy Athletics Field in Geelong.

=== 2018 ===
At the 2018 Commonwealth Games at the Gold Coast, Queensland, Jackson won a silver medal in the Men's F38 Shot Put with a put of 13.74m

=== 2019 ===
At the 2019 World Para Athletics Championships in Dubai, he won the bronze medal in the Men's Shot Put F38 with a personal best throw of 15.14m.

He is coached by former New Zealand Paralympian John Eden. Jackson competes for Athletics Chilwell.

=== 2021 ===
At the Athletics Australia Athletics Championships, he won the National Title and gold medal with a personal best throw of 15.46m

== Para Ice Hockey ==
Jackson has been selected to compete in the inaugural Australian men's para ice hockey team at the 2018 World Para Ice Hockey Championships in Finland.

He was named Alternate Captain if the 2018 Australian IceRoos team who went on to take home the bronze medal in the C-pool event.

== Honours ==
=== State championships ===
Year	Competition	Venue	Position	Event	Notes
2018	2018 Victorian Athletics Country Championships	Llanberris Reserve, Ballarat, Australia	1st	Shot Put TF38	13.39m
