= Matt Carroll (sports administrator) =

Australian sports administrator

Lewis Matthew "Matt" Carroll AM is an Australia sports administrator. In March 2017, he was appointed Chief Executive Officer of the Australian Olympic Committee.

== Personal ==
Carroll was born and raised in Mosman, New South Wales. His grandfather settled in Mosman after arriving from Ireland via New Zealand in 1890. He attended St Joseph's College, Hunters Hill. In 1982, Carroll completed a Bachelor's Degree in Construction from the University of New South Wales. He worked in his father's construction business before commencing employment as a sport administrator. He is married with three children.

== Career as a sports administrator ==
Carroll played over 250 with the Mosman Rugby Club and served as its president. His first primary involvement in sports administration was as a Rugby Director at the NSW Rugby from 1991 to 1995. He was responsible for representative and club rugby. Between 1995 and 2000, Carroll was General Manager at the Australian Rugby Union (ARU). He was then appointed to Chief Executive Officer of NSW Rugby, a position he held until December 2001. Whilst at the NSW Rugby Union, he led the organisation’s recovery from a significant debt position. He rejoined the Australian Rugby Union in 2002 as General Manager of 2003 Rugby World Cup, later serving as acting Chief Executive in 2003. He was appointed a Member of the Order of Australia for services to rugby in 2004.

In 2004, Carroll became the inaugural General Manager of Football Federation Australia's (FFA) A-League, a position he held until 2007. In addition to managing the A-League, he managed a comprehensive review of community football to maximise participation for FFA, state associations and clubs. In July, 2007 he rejoined Australian Rugby Union as its Deputy Chief Executive Officer. He resigned in March 2013.

From September 2013 until August 2014, he was Executive Adviser & Interim Chief Operating Officer for the 2019 Rugby World Cup Organising Committee in Japan. In November 2014, he was appointed Chief Executive Officer of Yachting Australia. Whilst at Yachting Australia, he moved the organisation from a federated to the centralised model.

Carroll has had a strong association with John O'Neill. He was deputy to O'Neill in his two stints at the Australian Rugby Union and at Football Federation Australia. In employing Carroll at the FFA in 2004, O'Neill said "Matt has shown a huge amount of competency and with his broad skills of running a successful major event (Rugby World Cup 2003) and establishing better relations between the governing body of the sport and the grassroots."

In March 2017, he was appointed Chief Executive Officer of the Australian Olympic Committee.

| Preceded by John O'Neill | Australian Rugby Union acting CEO; 2003 | Succeeded by Gary Flowers |
