= Australian Sport Awards =

The Australian Sport Awards, originally called the Sport Australia Awards, were established by the Confederation of Australian Sport in 1980. From 1980 to 1996, the awards were limited to seven categories.

In 1993, there was a merger of the Sport Australia Awards and the ABC Sports Award of the Year.

The Dawn Fraser Award was introduced in 2000 to reflect the achievements and standing of Dawn Fraser in Australia and on the international sporting stage.

== Major athlete awards ==
Year	Dawn Fraser Award	Female Athlete of the Year	Male Athlete of the Year	Team of the Year
1980	Not awarded	Michelle Ford (Swimming)	Alan Jones (Motor racing)	Australian Men's 4 × 100 m Medley Relay (Swimming)
1981	Not awarded	Vicki Hoffman (Squash)	Geoff Hunt (Squash)	Australia men's national field hockey team (Kookaburras)
1982	Not awarded	Lisa Curry (Swimming)	Robert de Castella (Athletics)	Australian Youth Soccer Team
1983	Not awarded	Jan Stephenson (Golf)	Robert de Castella (Athletics)	Australia II (Sailing)
1984	Not awarded	Glynis Nunn (Athletics)	Jon Sieben (Swimming)	Australian Olympic Men's 4000m Pursuit Team (Cycling)
1985	Not awarded	Adair Ferguson (Rowing)	Jeff Fenech (Boxing)	Australian national rugby union team (Wallabies)
1986	Not awarded	Debbie Flintoff (Athletics)	Greg Norman (Golf)	Australian Men's Eight Crew (Rowing)
1987	Not awarded	Kerry Saxby(Athletics)	Wayne Gardner (Motorcycle racing)	Australia men's national field hockey team (Kookaburras)
1988	Not awarded	Debbie Flintoff-King (Athletics)	Duncan Armstrong (Swimming)	Australia women's national field hockey team (Hockeyroos)
1989	Not awarded	Kerry Saxby (Athletics)	Allan Border (Cricket)	Australia national cricket team
1990	Not awarded	Hayley Lewis (Swimming)	Steve Moneghetti (Athletics)	Australia national cricket team
1991	Not awarded	Shelley Taylor-Smith (Swimming)	Simon Fairweather (Archery)	Australian Men's Coxless Four (Rowing)
1992	Not awarded	Kathy Watt (Cycling)	Kieren Perkins (Swimming)	Australian Men's Coxless Four (Rowing)
1993	Not awarded	Michelle Martin (Squash)	Gary Neiwand (Cycling)	Australia national cricket team and Men's 4000m Pursuit Team (Cycling)
1994	Not awarded	Samantha Riley (Swimming)	Kieren Perkins (Swimming)	Australia women's national field hockey team (Hockeyroos)
1995	Not awarded	Samantha Riley (Swimming)	Michael Doohan (Motorcycle racing)	Australia women's national field hockey team (Hockeyroos)
1996	Not awarded	Jackie Gallagher (Triathlon); Susie O'Neill (Swimming)	Michael Doohan (Motorcycle racing)	Australia women's national field hockey team (Hockeyroos)
1997	Not awarded	Cathy Freeman (Athletics)	Michael Doohan (Motorcycle racing	Australia women's national field hockey team (Hockeyroos)
1998	Not awarded	Susie O'Neill (Swimming	Michael Klim (Swimming	Australia women's national field hockey team (Hockeyroos)
1999	Not awarded	Louise Sauvage (Athletics)	Ian Thorpe (Swimming)	Australia national cricket team – International; Melbourne Storm (NRL) – National
2000	Karrie Webb (Golf)	Karrie Webb (Golf)	Ian Thorpe (Swimming)	Australian national rugby union team (Wallabies) – International; Essendon Football Club (AFL) – National
2001	Sarah Fitz-Gerald (Squash	Sarah Fitz-Gerald (Squash)	Ian Thorpe (Swimming)	Australian Women's Four (Rowing) – International; Brisbane Lions (AFL) – National
2002	Pat Rafter (Tennis)	Alisa Camplin (Freestyle skiing); Sarah Fitz-Gerald (Squash)	Lleyton Hewitt (Tennis)	Australia national cricket team – International; Brisbane Lions (AFL) – National
2003	Michael Milton (Skiing)	Layne Beachley (Surfing)	Ricky Ponting (Cricket)	Australian Davis Cup Squad (Tennis) – International; Brisbane Lions (AFL) – National
2004	Petria Thomas (Swimming)	Jodie Henry (Swimming)	Ian Thorpe (Swimming)	Australia men's national field hockey team (Kookaburras) – International; Port Adelaide Football Club (AFL) – National
2005	Grant Hackett (Swimming)	Leisel Jones (Swimming)	Grant Hackett (Swimming	Australia men's national soccer team (Socceroos) – International; Sydney Swans (AFL) – National
2006	Casey Stoner (Motorcycle racing)	Libby Lenton (Swimming)	Cadel Evans (Cycle racing)	Australia national cricket team – International; Geelong Cats (AFL) – National

== Young athlete awards ==
Year	Young Female Athlete of the Year	Young Male Athlete of the Year	Young Team of the Year
1980	Debbie Flintoff (Athletics)	Larry Kleist (Sailing)	Australian Junior Squash Team
1981	Anne Minter (Tennis)	Grant Kenny (Surf life saving)	Australian 16 & Under Tennis Team
1982	Kerri-Anne Connor (Paralympic swimming)	Pat Cash (Tennis)	Australian Schoolboys Rugby Union Team
1983	Julie Kent (Diving)	Darren Clark (Athletics)	National Youth Soccer Team
1984	Robyn Friday (Squash)	Dean Woods (Cycling	Australian Junior Men's Squash Team
1985	Cindy-Lou Fitzpatrick (Swimming)	Robert Waller (Cycling)	Australian Junior Women's Squash Team
1986	Jessica Crisp (Sailing)	Miles Murphy (Athletics)	Australian Schoolboys Rugby Union Team
1987	Sarah Fitz-Gerald (Squash	Jason Stoltenberg (Tennis)	Australian Girls 16 & Under Tennis Team
1988	Pauline Menczer (Surfing)	Michael Diamond (Shooting sport)	Australian World Youth Netball Cup Team
1989	Shelley Gorman (Basketball)	Michael Diamond (Shooting sport)	Australian Junior Women's Rowing Team
1990	Hayley Lewis (Swimming)	Rohan Robinson (Athletics)	Australian Women's Triathlon Team
1991	Hayley Lewis (Swimming)	Tim Forsyth (Athletics)	Australian Women's Youth Basketball Team
1992	Lynette McKenzie (Surfing)	Tim Forsyth (Athletics)	Australian Women's Junior Coxless Pair
1993	Louise Sauvage (Athletics)	Brad McGee (Cycling)	Australian Women's Youth Basketball Team
1994	Kasumi Takahashi (Gymnastics)	Brad McGee (Cycling)	Australian Junior 4000m Pursuit Cycling Team
1995	Sarah Blanck (Sailing	Luke Roberts (Cycling)	Australian Women's Junior Squash Team
1996	Rachel Linke (Cycling)	Taj Burrow (Surfing)	Australian Junior 4000m Pursuit Cycling Team
1997	Rachael Marshall (Cycling)	Grant Hackett (Swimming)	Australian U21 Men's Hockey Team
1998	Jelena Dokic (Tennis)	Ian Thorpe (Swimming)	Australian Athletics Men's 4 × 400 m Relay Team (Athletics)
1999	Georgie Clarke (Athletics); Lori Munz (Swimming)	Grant Hackett (Swimming)	Cycling Olympic Sprint Team
2000	Lauren Jackson (Basketball)	Aaron Baddeley (Golf)	Australian 21 & Under Netball Team
2001	Giaan Rooney (Swimming)	Grant Hackett (Swimming)	Australian U/19 Men's Softball Team
2002	Jana Pittman (Athletics)	Todd Reid (Tennis)	Australian U19 World Cup Cricket Team
2003	Lisa Mathison (Cycling); Nerissa Wright (Water skiing)	Nick Flanagan (Golf)	Australian Junior Track Cycling Team
2004	Liesel Jones (Swimming)	Michael Ford (Cycling)	470 Team Elise Rechichi / Tessa Parkinson (Sailing
2005	Libby Lenton (Swimming)	Chris Noffke (Athletics)	Australian Junior Men's Downhill Mountain Bike Team
2006	Josephine Tomic (Cycling)	Travis Meyer (Cycling)	Junior Track/Road Cycling World Championship Team

== Coaching, administration and officiating awards ==
Year	Coach of the Year	Sports Executive of the Year	Sports Official of the Year
1980	Lindsay Gaze (Basketball)	Phil Coles	Not awarded
1981	Bill Sweetenham (Swimming)	John Raschke	Not awarded
1982	Charlie Walsh (Cycling	Leslie Martyn	Not awarded
1983	Frank Stanton (Rugby league)	John Dedrick	Not awarded
1984	Charlie Walsh (Cycling	Verlie Seagrove	Not awarded
1985	Alan Jones (Rugby union)	James Barry	Not awarded
1986	Reinhold Batschi (Rowing)	Brian Emery	Not awarded
1987	Richard Aggiss (Field hockey)	Robert McMurtrie	Not awarded
1988	Laurie Lawrence (Swimming)	Graham Halbish; Adrienne Smith	Not awarded
1989	Johnny Lewis (Boxing)	Bill Palmer	Not awarded
1990	Craig Hilliard (Athletics)	Alan Atkins	Not awarded
1991	Ju Ping Tian (Gymnastics)	Noeleen Dix	Not awarded
1992	Noel Donaldson (Rowing))	Steve Haynes	Not awarded
1993	Charlie Walsh (Cycling)	Rod McGeoch	Not awarded
1994	Charlie Walsh (Cycling)	Bob McCullough	Not awarded
1995	Scott Volkers (Swimming)	Martin Whiteley	No awarded
1996	Ric Charlesworth (Field hockey)	Russell Withers	Not awarded
1997	Ric Charlesworth (Field hockey)	Robert Elphinston	Not awarded
1998	Jill McIntosh (Netball)	Perry Crosswhite	Donald Prior (Field hockey)
1999	Doug Frost (Swimming)	Rob Curkpatrick	Maureen Boyle (Netball)
2000	Ric Charlesworth (Field hockey)	Lois Appleby	Bill Harrigan (Rugby league)
2001	Darren Cahill (Tennis)	Robert Bradley	Reg Brandis (Athletics)
2002	Shayne Bannan (Cycling)	John O'Neill	Sharon Kelly (Netball)
2003	Leigh Matthews (AFL)	John O'Neill	Bill Harrigan (Rugby league)
2004	Barry Dancer (Field hockey)	Graham Fredricks	David Tillett (Sailing)
2005	Paul Roos (AFL)	David Gallop	Bill Mildenhall (Basketball)
2006	Norma Plummer (Netball)	Brian Cook	Barbara Morgan (Lifesaving)

== Other awards ==
Year	Sports Media Award	Business Innovation Award	Sport Export Award
1997	Bruce McAvaney	Not awarded	Not awarded
1998	Ron Reed	Not awarded	Not awarded
1999	Roy Masters	PMSI Group	AV Syntec
2000	Karen Tighe	AV Syntec	Cleanevent
2001	Karen Tighe	IsoSport Kinetic Pty Ltd	Sportstec Pty Ltd
2002	Special Broadcasting Service – Tour de France coverage	Golf BioDynamics Pty Ltd	Croker Oars Pty Ltd
2003	ABC Radio – 2003 Rugby World Cup coverage	AV Syntec Pty Ltd	Ronstan International Pty Ltd
2004	Channel Ten – Motor Sports coverage	Not awarded	Not awarded
2005	Special Broadcasting Service – 2006 World Cup Qualifier	SKUD18 (Vic)	Not awarded

== See also ==
- Sport in Australia
- Australian Institute of Sport Awards
- Sport Australia Hall of Fame
- ABC Sports Award of the Year
- World Trophy for Australasia
