= Emily Tapp =

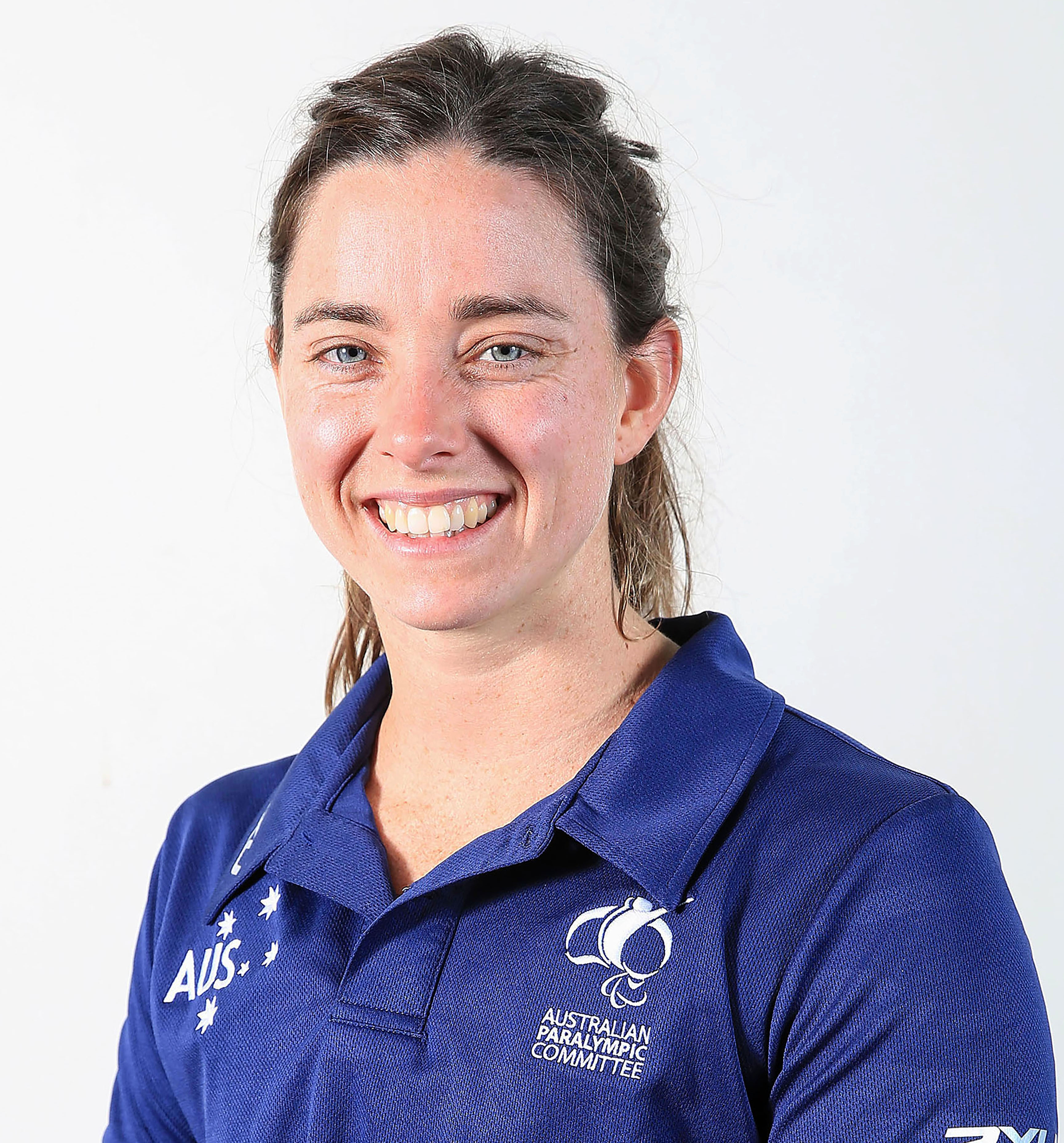
- 2016 Australian Paralympic team portrait of Emily Tapp

Personal information
- Nationality: (Australia) Australian
- Born: 1991 (age 34–35) Sydney, New South Wales, Australia

Sport
- Sport: Paratriathlon
Medal record
Representing Australia
Women's paratriathlon
World Championships
Gold medal – first place	2017 Rotterdam	PTWC
Gold medal – first place	2018 Gold Coast	PTWC
Silver medal – second place	2015 Chicago	PT1
Oceania Championships
Gold medal – first place	2016 Devonport	PT1
Gold medal – first place	2017 Devonport	PTWC
Silver medal – second place	2019 Newcastle	PTWC
Silver medal – second place	2020 Newcastle	PTWC
Commonwealth Games
Silver medal – second place	2018 Gold Coast	PTWC

Emily Tapp (born 1991) is an Australian wheelchair Paralympic athlete and triathlete. She was selected to represent Australia at the 2016 Rio Paralympics in athletics but was forced to withdraw before the Games due to a burns injury. She represented Australia at the 2020 Summer Paralympics in paratriathlon.

== Personal ==
On 8 January 2011 Tapp had a campdrafting fall that left her a paraplegic. The accident resulted in her spending eight months in hospital and three years of rehabilitation. Tapp grew up on a remote cattle property in the Northern Territory. She was a boarder at Fairholme College in Toowoomba, Queensland and graduated at the end of 2010. In 2020, the NSW Court of Appeal has dismissed an appeal from Tapp, who had sustained catastrophic injuries while competing in a campdraft competition organised by a not-for-profit community sports association, the Australian Bushmen's Campdraft & Rodeo Association. But in 2021, the High Court of Australia ordered the Australian Bushmen's Campdraft & Rodeo Association to pay Tapp $6.75m in damages.

In 2015, she was undertaking a Bachelor of International Business and Finance at University of Southern Queensland.

== Paratriathlon ==
In 2015, she won her first paratriathlon by winning the PT1 class at the OTU Oceania Paratriathlon Championships at Penrith, New South Wales.

Tapp was disappointed that the Women's PT1 event was not on the 2016 Rio Paralympics paratriathlon program.

At the 2020 Tokyo Paralympics, Tapp crashed into a barrier during the opening stages of the bike leg of the PTWC, rendering her bike unridable and forcing her to withdraw from the event.

=== International results ===
- 2015 – Penrith OTU Paratriathlon Oceania Championships – PT1 – 1st
- 2015 – Sunshine Coast ITU World Paratriathlon Event – PT1 – 1st
- 2015 – Yokohama ITU World Paratriathlon Event – PT1 – 1st
- 2015 – Detroit ITU World Paratriathlon Event - PT1 - 2nd
- 2015 – ITU World Triathlon Grand Final Chicago – PT1 – 2nd
- 2016 – Devonport OTU Paratriathlon Oceania Championships – PT1 – 1st
- 2016 – Penrith ITU World Paratriathlon Event – PT1 – 1st
- 2017 – Rotterdam ITU World Championships Final – PTWC – 1st
- 2018 – Commonwealth Games – PWTC – 2nd
- 2018 - Gold Coast World Championships Final - 1st
- 2019 - Lausanne ITU World Championships Final - PTWC - 6th
- 2021 - Tokyo Summer Paralympics - PTWC - Did not finish

== Athletics ==
Tapp is classified as a T54 athlete. Representing the Australian Capital Territory, she came fourth in the Women's 1500m at the 2016 Australian Athletics Championships. Tapp finished second to Christie Dawes in 2016 Gold Coast Marathon Women's Wheelchair race.

She was selected for the 2016 Rio Paralympics in athletics but she suffered a burn on her leg three weeks before she left for a training camp in Florida. The skin graft did not heal in time.

== Recognition ==
- 2018 - Canberra Sport Awards -Athlete of the Year Para Sport
- 2018 -Triathlon Australia Female Para Triathlon Performance of the Year
- 2019 - Triathlon Australia Female Para Triathlon Performance of the Year
