= Mosman bomb hoax =

2011 bomb hoax in Australia

- Date: 3 August 2011
- Location: Mosman, New South Wales, Australia; 33.8417°S 151.2474°E
- Cause: Suspected collar bomb
- Suspects: Paul Douglas Peters
- Charges: Aggravated break and enter, detaining for advantage
- Verdict: Guilty
- Convictions: 13.5 years (minimum 10 years)

The Mosman bomb hoax took place in the Lower North Shore Sydney suburb of Mosman, New South Wales, Australia on 3 August 2011. An apparent collar bomb was placed around the neck of 18-year-old student Madeleine Pulver by a balaclava-clad home intruder. A note attached to the device stated that any attempt to alert law enforcement would "trigger an immediate BRIAN DOUGLAS WELLS event". Brian Wells was a pizza delivery driver who was killed in a bank robbery involving a collar bomb in 2003.

== Investigation ==
The dummy device was of such sophistication that it took the Police Rescue & Bomb Disposal Unit almost 10 hours to ascertain that it was not an explosive device, and then to dismantle and remove it, in part with the telephoned assistance of a British Army major who was in Australia for training. The incident, which attracted media attention worldwide, was treated as an extortion investigation.

== Arrest and sentencing ==
Paul Douglas Peters, a man with no direct links to the victim or her family, was arrested in Kentucky, United States, after leaving Australia a few days after the incident. Police were unsure of motive, but were not looking for other suspects. Peters was extradited to Australia on 24 September 2011 and was held without bail by New South Wales Police. On 8 March 2012 he pleaded guilty in Sydney's Central Local Court to aggravated break and enter and detaining for advantage. On 20 November 2012, Peters was sentenced to a prison term of 13 years and 6 months, with a non-parole period of 10 years. In sentencing the judge said although Peters had marital and mental health issues, he engaged in a "deliberate act of extortion" and was not in a psychotic state at the time of the offence. Peters appealed his sentence to the NSW Court of Criminal Appeal. On 20 December 2013, the Court unanimously dismissed the appeal.

== See also ==
- Bill Pulver, father of victim Madeleine
