= Rohan Taylor =

American swimming coach

Rohan Taylor is the head coach of the Australian Dolphins swimming team and formerly State Head Coach for swimming in Victoria and Tasmania. He was the performance coach of the Nunawading Swimming Club based in Melbourne, Australia. He has previously coached at the Shoalhaven Academy, Carey Aquatic, Saddleback Valley Aquatics, Laguna Hills High School and Irvine Novaquatics. In September 2008 it was announced that he has been hired by the Nunawading Swimming Club as its new High Performance coach.

In 2007, Leisel Jones, who had won the 100 m and 200 m breaststroke at both the 2005 and 2007 World Championships, relocated to Melbourne for family reasons and began swimming under Taylor. She won the 100 m event at the 2008 Summer Olympics in Beijing.

In June 2020 Taylor was appointed as head coach of the Australian Dolphins Swimming Team, replacing Jacco Verhaeren in the role. Taylor's first Olympics as head coach of Australian swimming saw Australia have great success winning a record 9 gold medals and 21 total medals at the 2020 Tokyo Olympics held in 2021. In 2022 Australia won 6 gold medals at the 2022 World Aquatics Championships in Budapest and later that year Taylor led the Australian team to their most successful World Short Course Swimming Championships ever winning a record 13 gold medals in Melbourne.

In 2023, awarded Coach of the Year at the Australian Institute of Sport Performance Awards.
