= Bill Pulver =

Australian sporting administrator

- Born: William Pulver c. 1959
- Education: University of New South Wales
- Occupation: Chief Executive Officer
- Employer: Australian Rugby Union
- Known for: Corporate executive Father of Mosman bomb hoax victim
- Predecessor: John O'Neill

William Pulver is an Australian former sporting administrator. He was the CEO of the Australian Rugby Union after succeeding John O'Neill in early 2013.

Pulver's daughter Madeleine was the victim of the Mosman bomb hoax in 2011.

== Personal life ==
Pulver attended Shore School, class of 1977, and then the University of New South Wales. He is a member of the 2013 Board of Trustees for the Shore School Foundation.

Pulver is married with four children. The family owns properties in Mosman, Avoca Beach, and Bungendore.

== See also ==
- Israel Folau

Preceded by John O'Neill	Australian Rugby Union CEO; 2013–2017	Succeeded by Raelene Castle
