= Richard Aggiss =

Australian hockey coach

Richard John "Dick" Aggiss AM is a former Australia men's national field hockey team coach.

== Career ==
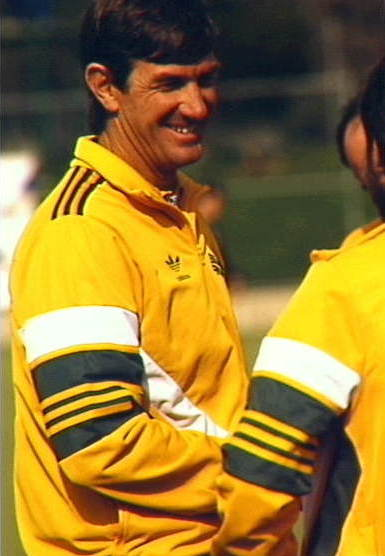
Australian / AIS Head Coach Richard Aggiss in 1988

Aggiss was Head Coach of the Australia men's national field hockey team from 1981 to 1988 and the inaugural Head Men's Coach of the Australian Institute of Sport hockey program from 1984 to 1994. During this period, major competitions were:

- 1982: 2nd – Champions Trophy
- 1983: 3rd – World Cup; 1st – Champions Trophy
- 1984: 4th – Los Angeles Olympic Games
- 1985: 1st – Champions Trophy
- 1986: 1st – World Cup; 2nd – Champions Trophy
- 1987: 3rd – Champions Trophy
- 1988: 4th – Seoul Olympic Games; 3rd – Champions Trophy

Aggiss has held several board positions. In 1998, he became a member of Australian Hockey Association (men), remained involved on the Board once the men's and women's associations amalgamated in 2000 to become Hockey Australia and served as vice president until 2006. He was a member of the Western Australian Institute of Sport Board from 1994 to 1999.

== Recognition ==
- 1984 – International Hockey Federation World Coach
- 1987 – Coach of the Year Australian Sport Awards
- 1988 – Member of the Order of Australia (AM) for his service to the sport of hockey.
- 2000 – Australian Sports Medal
- 2001 – Centenary Medal
