= ABC Sports Award of the Year =

Sports Award

ABC Sports Award of the Year was one of the premier sports awards in Australia. From 1951 to 1983, it was called the ABC Sportsman of the Year Award.

The award was originally voted for by Australian Broadcasting Corporation sports supervisors and the sports editors of major Australian newspapers. After 1983, members of the Australian Sportswriters' Association also voted. The awards were first presented on television in 1957.

Swimmer Dawn Fraser was voted as the best Australian sportsman of the 25 years in 1975 as part of the award silver jubilee celebrations.

In 1993, there was a merger of the Sport Australia Awards and the ABC Sports Award of the Year with the new award known as ABC Sport Australia Awards. After 1994, the new award removed the ABC from its title. The award was later known as the Australian Sport Awards and ceased in 2006. The main national annual awards are Sport Australia Hall of Fame Awards and the Australian Institute of Sport Awards.

== Individual award winners ==
Year	Athlete	Sport
1951	Frank Sedgman	Tennis
1952	Marjorie Jackson	Athletics
1953	Jimmy Carruthers	Boxing
1954	John Landy	Athletics
1955	Peter Thomson	Golf
1956	Betty Cuthbert	Athletics
1957	Stuart Mackenzie	Rowing
1958	Herb Elliott	Athletics
1959	Jack Brabham	Motor racing
1960	Herb Elliott	Athletics
1961	Richie Benaud	Cricket
1962	Dawn Fraser	Swimming
1963	Margaret Smith	Tennis
1964	Dawn Fraser	Swimming
1965	Ron Clarke	Athletics
1966	Jack Brabham	Motor racing
1967	Heather McKay	Squash
1968	Lionel Rose	Boxing
1969	Rod Laver	Tennis
1970	Margaret Court	Tennis
1971	Shane Gould	Swimming
1972	Shane Gould	Swimming
1973	Stephen Holland	Swimming
1974	Raelene Boyle	Athletics
1975	Bart Cummings	Horse racing
1976	Greg Chappell	Cricket
1977	Graham Marsh	Golf
1978	Tracey Wickham	Swimming
1979	David Graham	Golf
1980	Alan Jones	Motor racing
1981	Geoff Hunt	Squash
1982	Robert de Castella	Athletics
1983	Robert de Castella	Athletics
1984	Jon Sieben	Swimming
1985	Jeff Fenech	Boxing
1986	Greg Norman	Golf
1987	Wayne Gardner	Motorcycle racing
1988	Debbie Flintoff-King	Athletics
1989	Kerry Saxby	Athletics
1990	Hayley Lewis	Swimming
1991	Ian Baker-Finch	Golf
1992	Kieren Perkins	Swimming
1993	Greg Norman	Golf
1994	Kieren Perkins	Swimming

== Most Outstanding Team Award Winners ==
Team award was introduced in 1987.

Year	Team	Sport
1987	Australian cricket team	Cricket
1988	Australia women's national field hockey team (Hockeyroos)	Field hockey
1989	Australian cricket team	Cricket
1990	Australian men's rowing coxless four crew (Oarsome Foursome)	Rowing
1991	Australia national rugby union team (Wallabies)	Rugby union
1992	Australian men's rowing coxless four crew (Oarsome Foursome)	Rowing
1993	Australian cricket team (joint winner)	Cricket
1993	Australian Men's Team Pursuit Team (joint winner)	Cycling

== See also ==
- Sport in Australia
- Sport Australia Hall of Fame inductees
- Australian Sport Awards
- Australian Institute of Sport Awards
- World Trophy for Australasia
