= Lois Appleby =

Australian sport administrator

Lois Appleby has been a leading sport administrator in Australia, particularly in managing major international sporting events. She was originally from Canada.

== Career ==
Appleby held significant management roles over two decades in major international sporting events held in Australia. Her first experience in sports event management involved managing the 1977 Pacific Conference Games held in Canberra, Australian Capital Territory. After this event, she was the Project Manager of 1985 IAAF World Cup Canberra. In 1986, due to the inability to obtain events management work in Canberra, she took up a position as General Manager in the Tasmanian Department of Sport and Tourism. In 1991, the Brisbane Lord Mayor Sallyanne Atkinson lured her to Brisbane, Queensland to manage two large masters athlete sporting events – Australian Masters Games in 1991 and 3rd World Masters Games in 1994.

After the World Masters Games, she was appointed CEO of the 2000 Sydney Paralympics Organising Committee. Her major challenges in managing the Sydney Paralympics were increasing the public profile of the Games and the integration of its operations with the Sydney Olympic Games Organising Committee. The Official Report of the 2000 Sydney Olympics reported that The Sydney Paralympic Games were an outstanding success in every aspect and in many areas, such as athlete attendance, ticket sales, broadcast rights and merchandise sales.

After the Sydney Paralympics, she was CEO of Tourism Victoria from 2001 to 2006. Her expertise led to Appleby being appointed to a number of boards including Victorian Major Events Company, 2011 Rugby World Cup in New Zealand; Basketball Australia; and the World Masters Games in Melbourne 2002. Appleby returned to Calgary, Alberta, Canada and in 2013 was appointed to the board of the Organising Committee of the Tour of Alberta, a major road cycling event in Canada.

== Recognition ==
In January 2001, she was named as Sport Industry Australia's 2000 Executive of the Year, recognising her leadership of the Sydney Paralympic Games. In 2003, Appleby was appointed Honorary Consul for Canada in Melbourne, Victoria. In 2007, she was also appointed adjunct professor with Victoria University Faculty of Business and Law.

== Personal ==
Her son Chris Appleby was an Australian Institute of Sport basketball scholarship holder from 1983 to 1984. He represented Australia at the 1983 and 1985 Summer Universiade and played for the Canberra Cannons.
