= World Trophy for Australasia =

The World Trophy for Australasia was one of several annual sporting trophies awarded by the Helms Athletic Foundation. The World Trophy was established by Helms in 1939 to honour the foremost amateur athlete of each continent of the world, including Africa, Asia, Australasia, Europe, North America, and South America.

Australasian awards for 1896 to 1949 were decided by a Committee in Australasia established by the Foundation. Members of the Committee were Sir Frank Beaurepaire (Chairman), and Messrs. Harold G. Alderson, Hugh R. Weir, Jack Metcalfe, Frank H. Pizzey, Hector de Lacy, Ern Cowley and R.J. McPherson (Secretary). After the initial Committee selection, amateur athletes were nominated by their own countries for consideration by the Foundation. Winners were presented with a silver plaque and had their names added to the World Trophy that was located at the Helms Foundation and subsequently the Amateur Athletic Foundation of Los Angeles (now known as the LA84 Foundation). Winners can only win the award once.

== Winners ==
Year	Athlete	Sport	Country
1896	Edwin Flack	Athletics	Australia
1897	Alex B. Sloan	Rowing	Australia
1898	Victor Trumper	Cricket	Australia
1899	Stan Rowley	Athletics	Australia
1900	Frederick Lane	Swimming	Australia
1901	George A. Moir	Athletics	Australia
1902	James Donald	Rowing	Australia
1903	Richmond 'Dick' Cavill	Swimming	Australia
1904	Herbert Hunter	Athletics	Australia
1905	Benard Kieran	Swimming	Australia
1906	Nigel Barker	Athletics	Australia
1907	Norman Brookes	Tennis	Australia
1908	Snowy Baker	Multiple sports	Australia
1909	Tony Wilding	Tennis	New Zealand
1910	Frank Beaurepaire	Swimming	Australia
1911	Harold Hardwick	Swimming	Australia
1912	Cecil Healy	Swimming	Australia
1913	Cecil McVilly	Rowing	Australia
1914	Bill Longworth	Swimming	Australia
1915	Fanny Durack	Swimming	Australia
1916–18	No awards		
1919	Clive Disher	Rowing	Australia
1920	Ivo Whitton	Golf	Australia
1921	Edwin 'Slip' Carr	Athletics	Australia
1922	Gerald Patterson	Tennis	Australia
1923	Nick Winter	Athletics	Australia
1924	Andrew Charlton	Swimming	Australia
1925	Victor Richardson	Multiple sports	Australia
1926	Randolph Rose	Athletics	New Zealand
1927	Stanley Lay	Athletics	New Zealand
1928	Bobby Pearce	Rowing	Australia
1929	Jim Carlton	Athletics	Australia
1930	Don Bradman	Cricket	Australia
1931	Noel Ryan	Swimming	Australia
1932	Edgar 'Dunc' Gray	Cycling	Australia
1933	Jack Crawford	Tennis	Australia
1934	Jack Metcalfe	Athletics	Australia
1935	Cecil Matthews	Athletics	New Zealand
1936	Jack Lovelock	Athletics	New Zealand
1937	Robin Biddulph	Swimming	Australia
1938	Jim Ferrier	Golf	Australia
1939	Dr David 'Brian' Dunn	Athletics	Australia
1940–44	No awards		
1945	Doug Harris	Athletics	New Zealand
1946	John Treloar	Athletics	Australia
1947	John Winter	Athletics	Australia
1948	Merv Wood	Rowing	Australia
1949	Sid Patterson	Cycling	Australia
1950	John Marshall	Swimming	Australia
1951	Frank Sedgman	Tennis	Australia
1952	Marjorie Jackson	Athletics	Australia
1953	John Landy	Athletics	Australia
1954	Jon Henricks	Swimming	Australia
1955	Shirley Strickland	Athletics	Australia
1956	Lorraine Crapp	Swimming	Australia
1957	Stuart Mackenzie	Rowing	Australia
1958	Herb Elliott	Athletics	Australia
1959	John Konrads	Swimming	Australia
1960	Peter Snell	Athletics	New Zealand
1961	Dawn Fraser	Swimming	Australia
1962	Murray Rose	Swimming	Australia
1963	Tony Sneazwell	Athletics	Australia
1964	Betty Cuthbert	Athletics	Australia
1965	Ron Clarke	Athletics	Australia
1966	Fred Stolle	Tennis	Australia
1967	Judy Pollock	Athletics	Australia
1968	Michael Wenden	Swimming	Australia
1969	Pam Kilborn	Athletics	Australia
1970	Kerry O'Brien	Athletics	Australia
1971	Shane Gould	Swimming	Australia
1972	Gail Neall	Swimming	Australia
1973	Stephen Holland	Swimming	Australia
1974	Jenny Turrall	Swimming	Australia
1975	John Walker	Athletics	New Zealand
1976	Dick Quax	Athletics	New Zealand
1977	Eddie Palubinskas	Basketball	Australia
1978	Tracey Wickham	Swimming	Australia
1979	Rod Dixon	Athletics	New Zealand
1980	Michelle Ford	Swimming	Australia
1981	Allison Roe	Athletics	New Zealand
1982	Anne Audain	Athletics	New Zealand
1983	Robert de Castella	Athletics	Australia
1984	Jon Sieben	Swimming	Australia
1985	Glynis Nunn	Athletics	Australia
1986	Suzanne Landells	Swimming	Australia
1987	Debbie Flintoff-King	Athletics	Australia
1988	Duncan Armstrong	Swimming	Australia
1989	Kerry Saxby	Athletics	Australia
1990	Hayley Lewis	Swimming	Australia
1991	Kieren Perkins	Swimming	Australia
1992	James Tomkins	Rowing	Australia
1993	Danyon Loader	Swimming	New Zealand
1994	Samantha Riley	Swimming	Australia
1995	Russell Coutts	Yachting	New Zealand
1996	Susan O'Neill	Swimming	Australia
1997	Beatrice Faumuina	Athletics	New Zealand
1998	Michael Klim	Swimming	Australia
1999	Ian Thorpe	Swimming	Australia
2000	Cathy Freeman	Athletics	Australia

== See also ==
- Sport Australia Hall of Fame inductees
- Sport in Australia
- Australian Sport Awards
- Australian Institute of Sport Awards
- ABC Sports Award of the Year
