= Sport Australia Hall of Fame Awards =

Athletics Hall of Fame

Sport Australia Hall of Fame
- Established: 1985
- Location: Melbourne Cricket Ground
- Chairperson: John Bertrand
- Website: https://sahof.org.au/

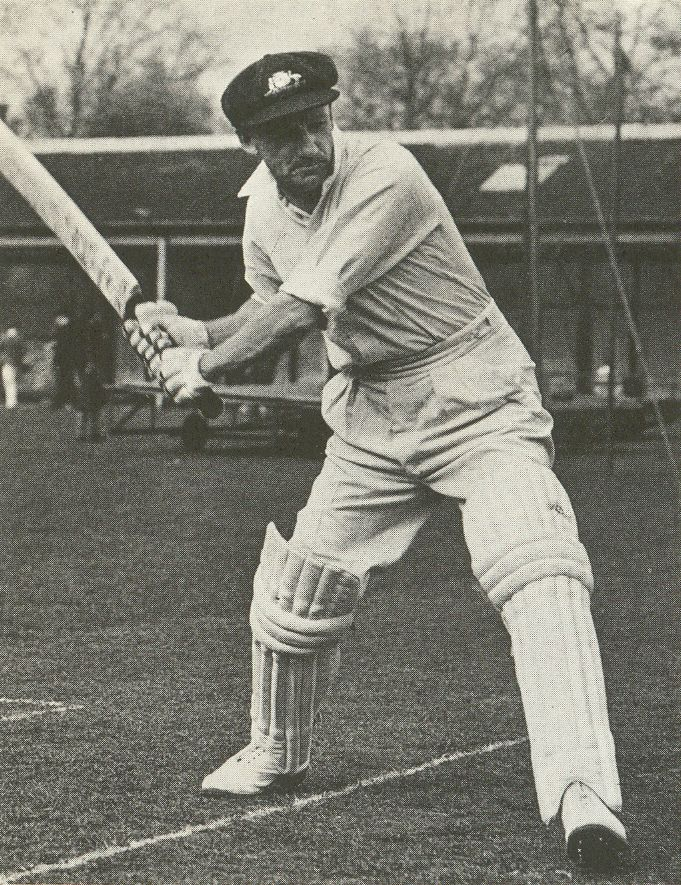

The Sport Australia Hall of Fame was established on 10 December 1985 to recognise the achievements of Australian sportsmen and sportswomen. The inaugural induction included 120 members with Sir Don Bradman as the first inductee and Dawn Fraser the first female inductee. In 1989, the Hall of Fame was expanded to include associate members who have assisted in the development of sport in Australia. In 2012, there were 518 members. Each year the Hall of Fame inducts notable retired athletes, associate members and upgrades one member to 'legend' status.

The main award each year is the 'Don' Award but other awards include Team Sport Australia Award, Spirit of Sport Award and Hall of Fame Moments.

The National Sports Museum located at the Melbourne Cricket Ground houses the Sport Australia Hall of Fame.

== The Don Award ==
This award was first awarded in 1998. It is named after Sir Donald Bradman and recognises the sporting achievement of the year which has inspired the people of Australia. As of 2022, there are three people who have won the award more than once; Steve Hooker (2008 and 2009), Sally Pearson (2012 and 2014) and Ashleigh Barty (2019 and 2022).

Year	Athlete/team	Sport	Ref.
1998	Mark Taylor	Cricket	
1998	Heather Turland	Athletics	
1999	Ian Thorpe	Swimming	
2000	Cathy Freeman	Athletics	
2001	Pat Rafter	Tennis	
2002	Alisa Camplin	Freestyle skiing	
2002	Steven Bradbury	Speed skating	
2003	Damien Oliver	Horse racing	
2004	Petria Thomas	Swimming	
2005	Grant Hackett	Swimming	
2006	Kerryn McCann	Athletics	
2006	Socceroos	Soccer	
2007	Glenn McGrath	Cricket	
2007	Shane Warne	Cricket	
2008	Matthew Mitcham	Diving	
2008	Steven Hooker	Athletics	
2009	Steven Hooker	Athletics	
2010	Lydia Lassila	Freestyle skiing	
2011	Cadel Evans	Cycling	
2012	Sally Pearson	Athletics	
2013	Adam Scott	Golf	
2014	Sally Pearson	Athletics	
2015	Jason Day	Golf	
2016	Michelle Payne	Horse racing	
2017	Jeff Horn	Boxing	
2018	Kurt Fearnley	Athletics (Paralympic)	
2019	Ashleigh Barty	Tennis	
2020	Australian women's T20 cricket team	Cricket	
2021	Patty Mills	Basketball	
2022	Ashleigh Barty	Tennis	
2023	Matildas	Soccer	
2024	Jessica and Noemi Fox	Canoeing	
2025	Oscar Piastri	Motorsport	

== The Dawn Award ==
This award was first awarded in 2021. It is named after Dawn Fraser and recognises a courageous ground-breaker who has demonstrated achievement against the odds and challenged the status quo.

Year	Athlete/team	Sport	Ref.
2021	Evonne Goolagong Cawley	Tennis	
2022	Peter Norman	Athletics	
2023	2000 Olympics Australian women's water polo team	Water polo	
2024	Lauren Jackson	Basketball	
2025	Layne Beachley	Surfing	

== Legends ==
Induction year	Athlete	Sport	Legend year	Ref.
1985	Don Bradman	Cricket	1993	
1985	Dawn Fraser	Swimming	1993	
1985	Hubert Opperman	Cycling	1993	
1985	Betty Cuthbert	Athletics	1994	
1985	Evonne Goolagong Cawley	Tennis	1994	
1985	Jock Sturrock	Sailing	1994	
1986	Scobie Breasley	Horse racing	1995	
1985	Shirley de la Hunty	Athletics	1995	
1985	Reg Gasnier	Rugby league	1995	
1985	Dunc Gray	Cycling	1995	
1985	Marjorie Jackson-Nelson	Athletics	1995	
1985	Ted Whitten	Australian rules football	1995	
1985	Shane Gould	Swimming	1996	
1986	Vic Patrick	Boxing	1996	
1985	Bill Roycroft	Equestrian	1996	
1985	Herb Elliott	Athletics	1997	
1985	Margaret Court	Tennis	1998	
1985	Walter Lindrum	Billiards	1998	
1985	Murray Rose	Swimming	1999	
1985	Heather McKay	Squash	2000	
1985	Peter Thomson	Golf	2001	
1985	Rod Laver	Tennis	2002	
1985	Jack Brabham	Motorsport	2003	
1986	Keith Miller	Cricket	2004	
1985	John Landy	Athletics	2005	
1987	Ron Barassi	Australian rules football	2006	
1988	Greg Norman	Golf	2007	
1991	Bart Cummings	Horse racing	2008	
1985	Edwin Flack	Athletics	2009	
1985	Ken Rosewall	Tennis	2009	
1994	Leigh Matthews	Australian rules football	2010	
1985	John Raper	Rugby league	2010	
2005	Cathy Freeman	Athletics	2011	
2002	Susie O'Neill	Swimming	2012	
1985	John Bertrand	Sailing	2013	
1985	John Newcombe	Tennis	2014	
1987	Anne Sargeant	Netball	2015	
1987	Wally Lewis	Rugby league	2016	
1985	Raelene Boyle	Athletics	2017	
1985	Richie Benaud	Cricket	2018	
2007	Louise Sauvage	Athletics (Paralympic)	2019	
2003	John Eales	Rugby union	2020	
1985	Dennis Lillee	Cricket	2021	
2008	Ian Thorpe	Swimming	2021	
1985	Ron Clarke	Athletics	2022	
2009	Shane Warne	Cricket	2022	
2011	Layne Beachley	Surfing	2023	
1987	Mark Ella	Rugby union	2023	
1985	Bob Skilton	Australian rules football	2023	
1985	Geoff Hunt	Squash	2024	
2014	Michael Milton	Para-skiing	2024	
2011	Belinda Clark	Cricket	2025	
2005	Andrew Gaze	Basketball	2025	
1985	Frank Sedgman	Tennis	2026	
2009	Liz Ellis	Netball	2026	
2009	Mick Doohan	Motorcycling	2026	

== See also ==
- National Sports Museum
- Sport in Australia
- ABC Sports Award of the Year
- Australian Sport Awards
- Australian Institute of Sport Awards
- World Trophy for Australasia
- Sport Australia Hall of Fame inductees
