= Carrie Graf =

Australian basketball coach

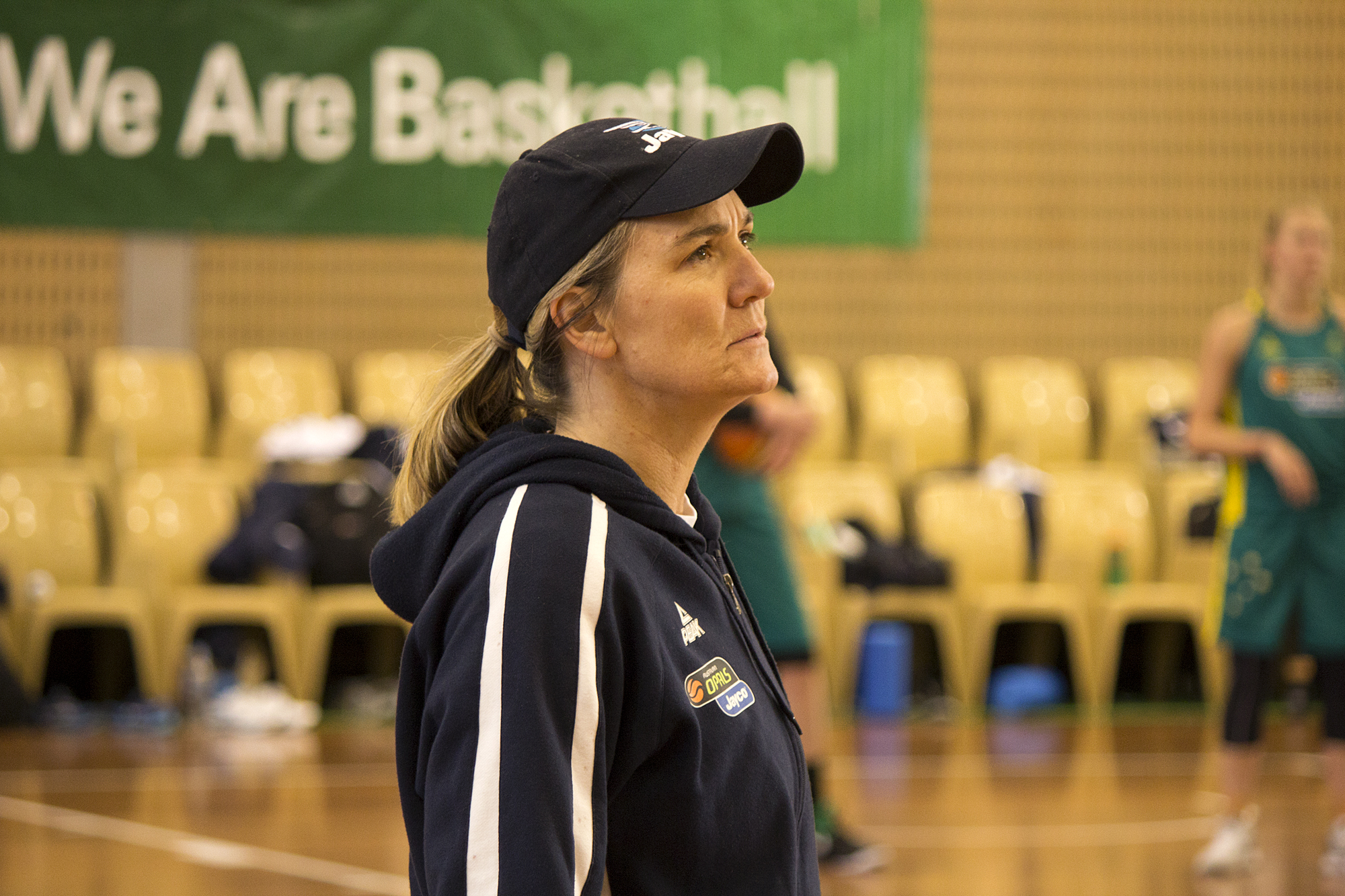
- Graf at a national team training camp

Biographical details
- Born: 23 June 1967 (age 59)

Accomplishments and honors

Awards
- Australian Sports Medal (2000); 2× WNBL Coach of the Year (2007, 2008); Basketball Australia Hall of Fame (2017)

Carrie Ann Graf AM (born 23 June 1967) is an Australian basketball coach. She competed in the WNBL as a player starting during 1983–1989, after which she attended RMIT. Graf has coached teams in the WNBL, WNBA and Australia's national team, and has been honoured for her contribution to basketball coaching.

== Early life and education ==
After having earned a diploma of coaching from the Australian Coaching Council in 1991, Graf attended RMIT in Melbourne, Victoria, where she earned a Bachelor of Applied Science in Physical Education in 1992. She has several hobbies including listening to music and cooking.

== Player ==
Graff started her professional basketball career as a 15-year-old with the Nunawading Spectres in the WNBL. In her first year of a seven-year stint with the Spectres from 1983 until 1989, she was named the Rookie of the Year and competed in the league Championships. She also played on the team for RMIT when she was a student there.

== Coaching ==
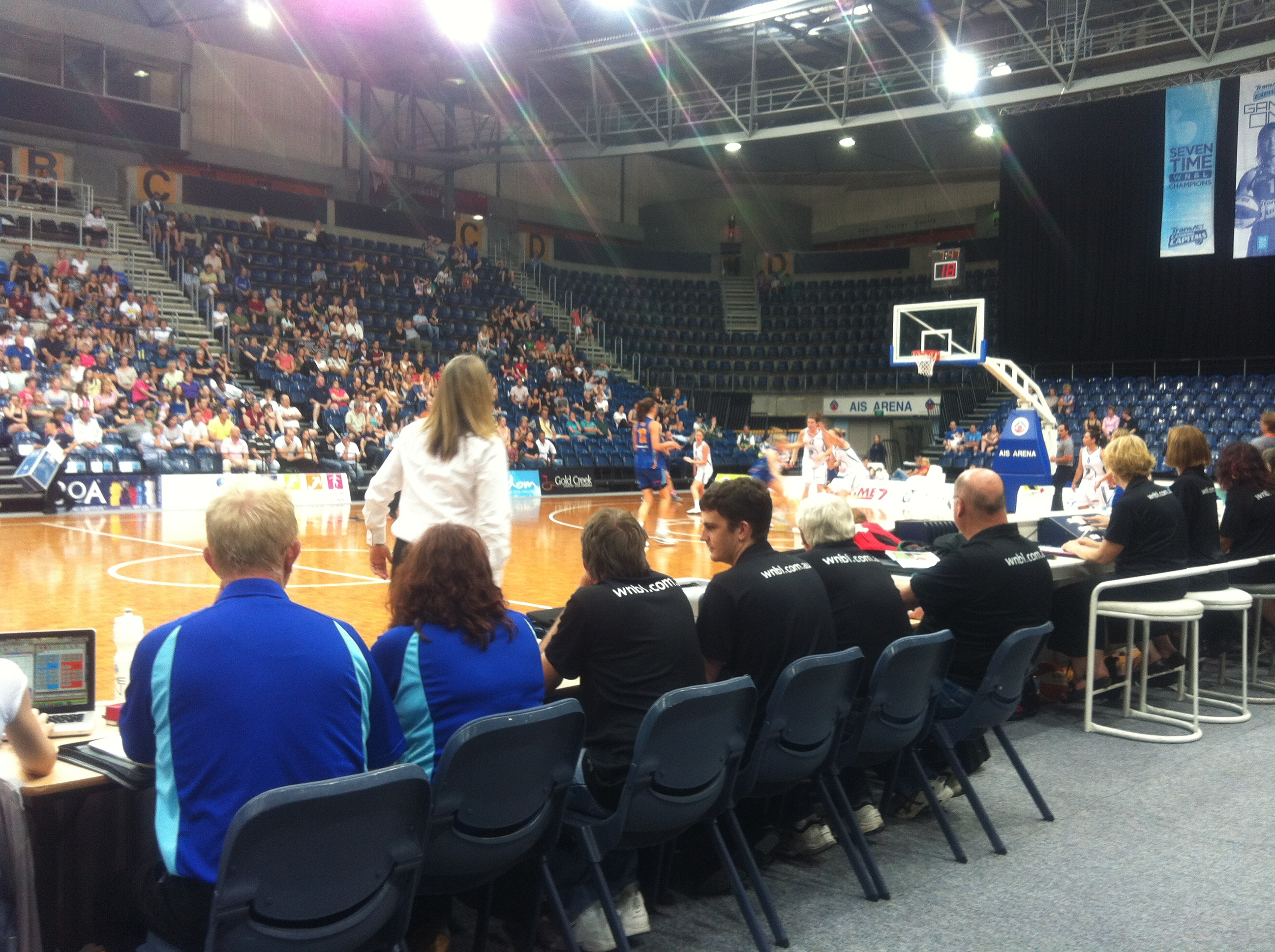
Graff, in white, walks in front of the scoring table during a Capitals game

Graf has coached women's basketball for over 30 years.

=== WNBL ===
In 2007 and 2008, Graf was named the WNBL Coach of the Year. As of 2010, she holds the most records in the WNBL for coaching wins, with over 200.

==== Sydney Flames ====
From 1993 to 1996, Graf coached the Sydney Flames. In 1993 and 1996, her teams finished first, and had only one loss alongside seventeen wins.

==== Canberra Capitals ====
Graf coached the Canberra Capitals from 1999 to 2016, across 15 seasons, excluding 2002 and 2004 during which she was coaching Phoenix Mercury in the NBA. She coached the team to win six titles in the WNBL Championship, including the 2000, 2002, 2006, 2007, 2009 and 2010 seasons.

=== WNBA ===
In 2004 and 2005, Graf coached Phoenix Mercury in the WNBA. Prior to holding that position, she was an assistant coach with the team for four years in 1998, 1999, 2001 and 2003. She did not coach during the 2000 season because of her commitments to the Australian national team.

=== National team ===
Lauren Jackson, Jenna O'Hea and Carrie Graf at a 14 May 2012 press conference at the Australian Institute of Sport

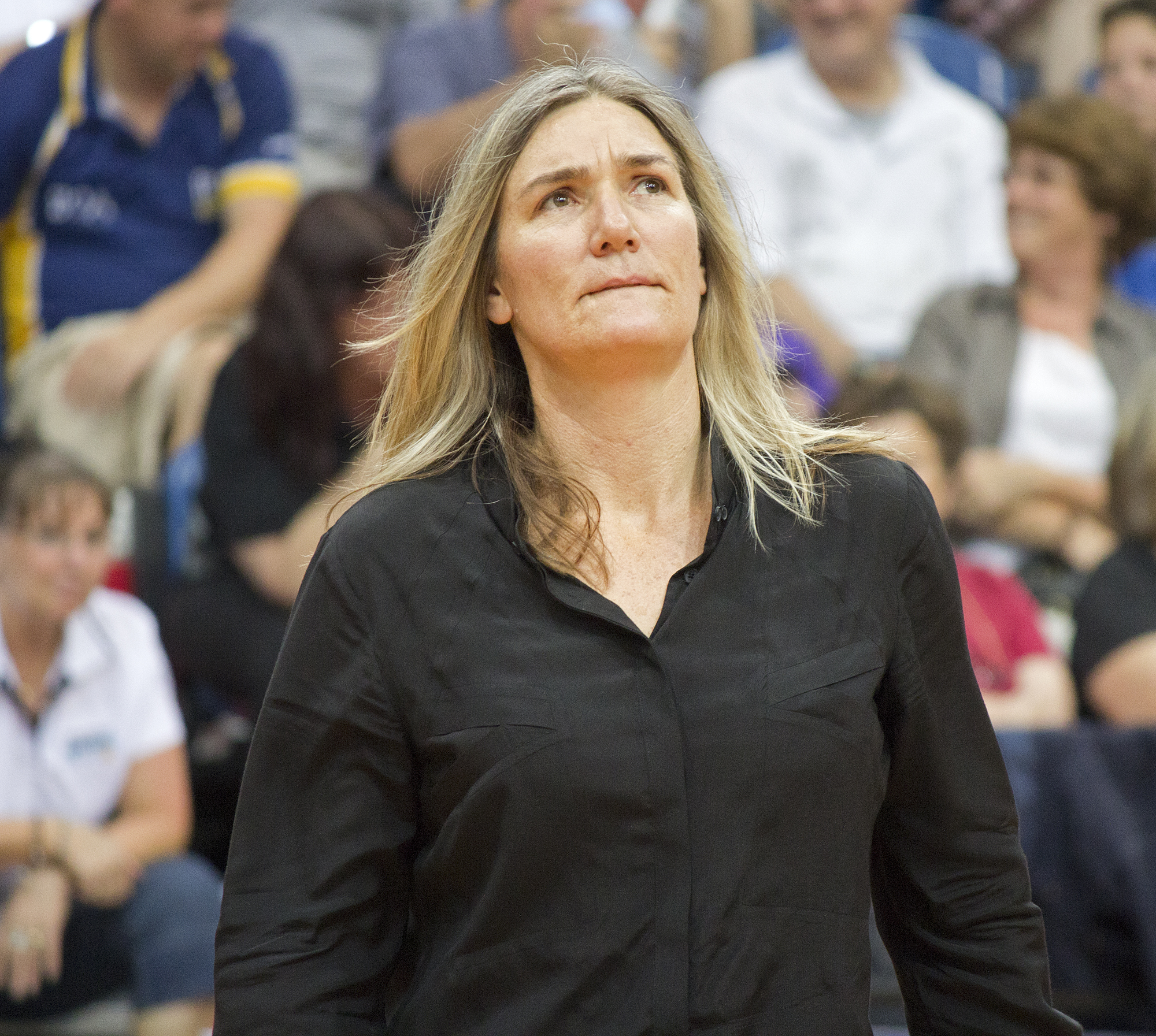
Graf during a game between the Capitals and Logan Thunder at AIS Arena

Graf was an assistant coach for the national team that competed at the 1996 Summer Olympics, when the team won a bronze medal and when the team won a silver medal at the 2000 Summer Olympics. Graf became the coach of the Australia women's national basketball team in December 2008. In 2009, she coached the Australian side that won the FIBA Oceania Championship. Graf resigned as coach of the women's national team in 2013 after four years.

Graf coached the Australian side that competed in and won the women's basketball competition at the 2007 World University Games. She led the Uniroos team, the Australian delegates, at the 2021 World University Games.

=== University coaching ===
In December 2017, Graf joined the University of Canberra in the newly created position of Director of Sport. She had previously been the university's first coach in residence in 2013, which included mentoring programs and conducting lectures, as part of the university's sport studies program, as an associate professor.

== Television ==
Graf has been a commentator for the WNBL since 2021.

== Recognition ==
In 1996, the Australian Coaching Council awarded Graf with the High Performance Coach Award and Young Coach of the Year Award. In 2000, Graf was honoured with being given an Australian Sports Medal for service to basketball. She has also been honoured by being named a life member of the WNBL in 2006. ACTsport named her the Sportsperson of the year in 2008.

At the 2015 Australia Day Honours, Carrie was appointed a Member of the Order of Australia for her significant service to basketball, particularly as a coach, mentor and athlete, and to the community. In 2017, she was inducted into the Basketball Australia Hall of Fame. Graf was awarded the Australian Sports Medal in 2000 in recognition of her results at the 2000 Olympics.

In 2024, inducted into ACT Sport Hall of Fame as Associate Member.

== Head coaching record ==
Team	Year	G	W	L	W–L%	Finish	PG	PW	PL	PW–L%	Result
Phoenix	2004	34	17	17	.500	5th in Western	—	—	—	—	Missed playoffs
Phoenix	2005	34	16	18	.471	5th in Western	—	—	—	—	Missed playoffs
Career		68	33	35	.485		—	—	—	—	

== Personal life ==
Graf ended a relationship with her partner, a former federal agent, and lives in Ainslie, Canberra. They have three children. Graf’s ex also appeared in the second season of the Australian version of The Traitors.
