= Craig Hilliard =

Australian athletics coach (born 1957)

Craig Hilliard (born 28 January 1957 in Melbourne) is a leading Australian athletics coach and was Head Coach of the Australian Athletics Team 2015 to 2018.

== Athletics career ==
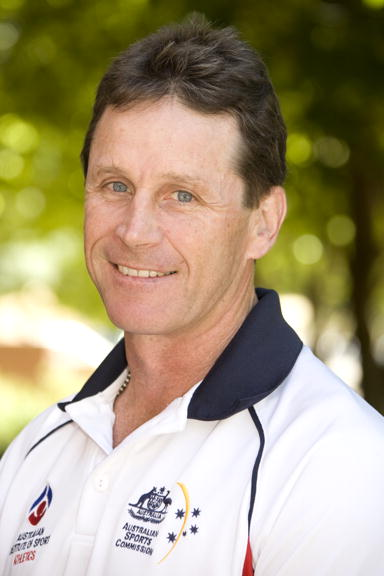
Portrait of AIS Athletics Coach Craig Hilliard in 2009

Hilliard is a former 110m and 400m hurdler. At the 1973-74 Australian Junior Championships, he finished second in the Men's 400m hurdles. Junior T & F In September 2015, Hilliard still held nine Old Scotch athletics records, including under 17, under 18, under 19, under 20 and open 110m hurdles, all set in the mid-1970s. He retired from competitive athletics in 1982 after his fourth knee operation and turned to coaching.

== Coaching career ==
After leaving Scotch College, Hilliard completed a Bachelor of Applied Science - Physical Education at Phillip Institute of Technology and Graduate Diploma of Sports Science at Rusden State College.

Prior to being appointed an athletics coach with the Australian Institute of Sport in 1982, Hillard was a physical education teacher at Ivanhoe Grammar School. Whilst at the AIS (1982–2013), he personally coached athletes that had won 11 gold, 12 silver and two bronze at open major championships including the Olympic Games, the Commonwealth Games, the World Championships, World Indoors and the World Race Walking Cup. Notable athletes coached by Hilliard at the AIS include:

- long jumpers - Jai Taurima, Nicole Boegman, Robbie Crowther
- race walkers - Sue Cook, Kerry Saxby-Junna, David Smith, Simon Baker Nathan Deakes, Nick A'Hern, Luke Adams
- hurdlers - Jana Pittman, Jane Flemming (also heptathlon) and Rohan Robinson.

In 2013, he was appointed Athletics Australia Senior Athletics Coach and Mentor after the AIS Athletics Program ceased operation as a result of the AIS Winning Edge Strategy. In April 2015, he was appointed Head Coach of the Australian Athletics Team.

At the time of his appointment as Head Coach of the Australian Athletics Team in April 2015, he was a coach on twenty-four Australian teams, including six Olympic Games, seven Commonwealth Games and ten IAAF World Championships. Team Coach on a further twenty-three Australian teams, including six Olympic Games, seven Commonwealth Games and ten IAAF World Championships.National coaching appointments include:

- Summer Olympic Games - 1988, 1992, 1996, 2000, 2008, 2012, 2016 (Head Coach)
- World Athletics Championships - 1987 (Team Coach), 1991 (Team Coach), 1993 (Head Coach), 1995 (team Coach), 1997 (Head Coach), 1999 (Team Coach), 2001 (Team Coach), 2003 (Team Coach), 2005 (Team Coach), 2007 (team Coach), 2009 (Team Coach), 2011 (Team Coach), 2013 (Team Coach), 2015 (Head Coach), 2017 (Head Coach)
- World Athletics Indoor Championships - 1989, 1991 (Head Coach)
- Commonwealth Games - 1994 (Head Coach), 1998 (Coach), 2002 (Coach), 2006 (Jumps Coach), 2010 (Coaching Coordinator and Walks), 2014
- Summer Universiade - 1985 (Head Coach), 1989 (Head Coach), 2003 (Head Coach)

After leaving theposition of Head Coach of Athletics Australia at the end of 2018, Hilliard was appointed as a mentor coach for the next generation of Australian coaches including the likes of medal-winning Mike Barber, Matt Beckenham, Matt Horsnell, Russell Stratton, Alex Stewart and Paul Burgess. He left this position in November 2024.

== Recognition ==
- 1990 - Coach of the Year at Australian Sports Awards
- 1994 - Athletics Australia Coach of The Year
- 2000 - Henri Schubert Award
- 2002 - Athletics Australia Coach of The Year
- 2007 - Athletics Australia Coach of The Year
- 2007 - Australian Institute of Sport Coach of the Year
- 2012 - Honorary Life Member Athletics Australia
