= Australian Coaching Council =

Australian Coaching Council was established in 1978 to establish a national approach to sports coaching in Australia.

== Background ==
At Sport and Recreation Ministers' Council on 26 May 1978, it was agreed to established the National Coaching Council. In March 1979 it was renamed the Australian Coaching Council. The primary objectives of the Council were: establishing a national coach and accreditation scheme and providing opportunities for coach education. Council comprised representatives from government and sport. Australian Government representative Paul Brettel was chairman from 1978 to 1982.

== Timeline of activities ==
- 25 July 1979 National Coaching Accreditation Scheme (NCAS) launched. This scheme was based on the Canadian model.
- 1984 – The Coaching Director magazine established. Later known as The Sport Educator.
- October 1986 - Australian Coaching Council moved from Melbourne to National Outdoor Stadium, Canberra.
- 5 - 7 December 1986 - 1st Elite Coaches Seminar held at Australian Institute of Sport (AIS).
- 1990 - Australian Coach Awards established. Finished in 1998.
- 1991 - Australian Coaching Council Incorporated was registered under the ACT Associations Incorporation Act (1991).
- 1991 - Australian Coaching Council officially became part of the Australian Sports Commission’s coaching arm.
- 1991 - Coaching Athletes with Disabilities (CAD) Scheme established with National Sports Organisations for the Disabled (NSODs).
- 1992 - Australian Coaching Council helped to establish State Coaching Centres with development officers in each state and territory
- 1993 - National Coaching Scholarship Program established with AIS and state institute/academies of sport.
- January 1994 - National Officiating Program (NOP) and National Officiating Accreditation Scheme (NOAS). Seven sports part of the Scheme.
- 1994 – Year of the Coach promotional campaign.
- 1994 - It was a Registered Training Organisation (RTO) from 1 July 1994. It ceased as a RTO on 7 September 2002.
- 1999 - Thanks Coach Campaign.
- 1 July 2000 - Sport Education Unit of the Australian Sports Commission took over the administrative functions of the Australian Coaching Council.
- September 2002 - the Australian Coaching Council is wound down as an incorporated association.
- March 2018 - the Australian Coaching Council is reformed.
