= Jayden Sawyer =

Australian Paralympic athlete

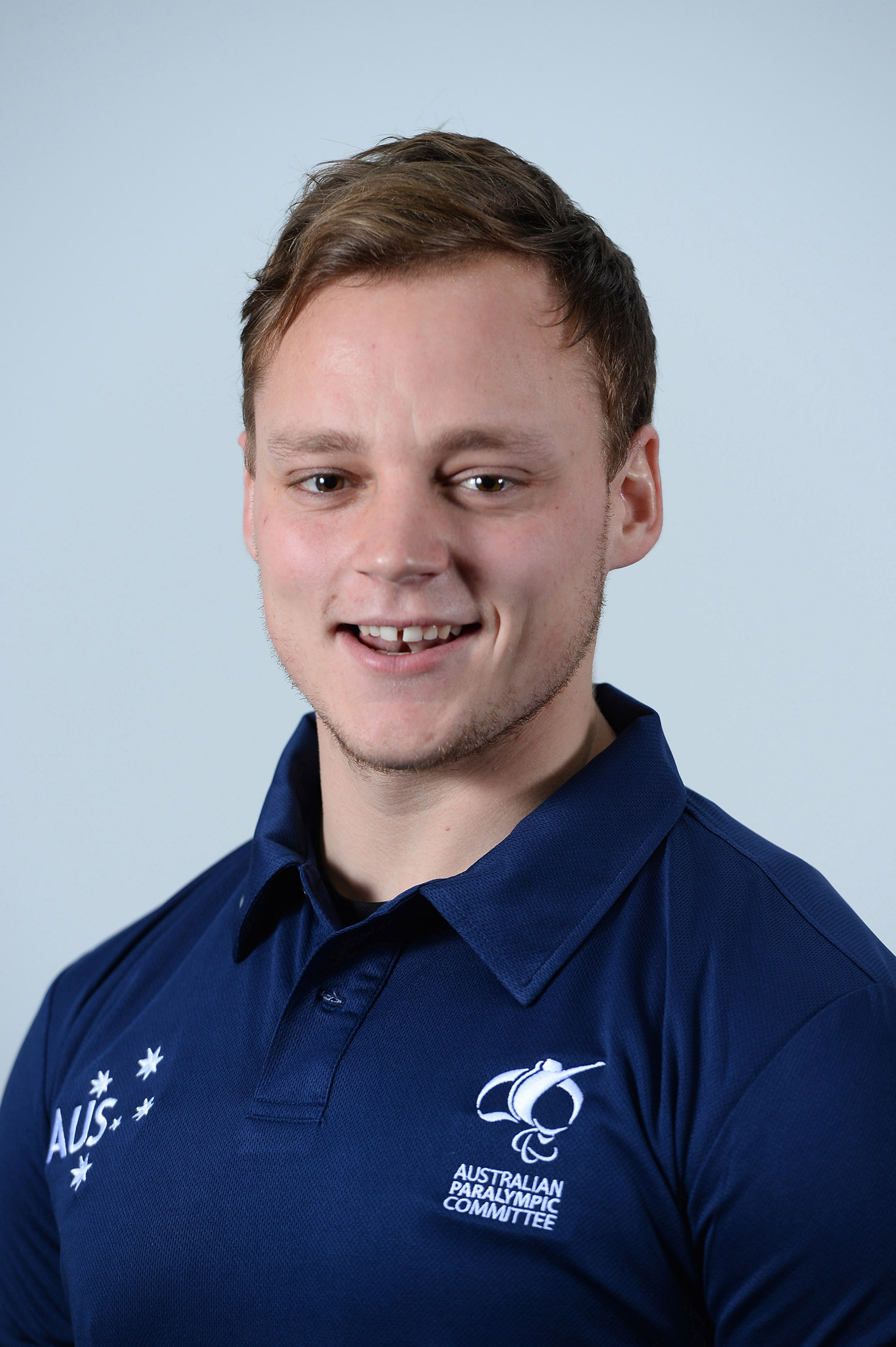
- 2016 Australian Paralympic team portrait

Personal information
- Nationality: Australia
- Born: 26 September 1993 (age 32)
Medal record
Representing Australia
Men's Track and Field
World Para Athletics Championships
| Gold medal – first place | 2017 London | Men's Javelin Throw F38 |
| Bronze medal – third place | 2013Lyon | Men's Javelin Throw F37/38 |

Jayden Sawyer (born 26 September 1993) is an Australian para athlete who competes mainly in the F38 category in throwing events. He won has won gold and bronze medals at the World Para Athletics Championships. He competed at the 2016 Rio and 2020 Tokyo Summer Paralympics.

== Personal ==
Sawyer was born on 26 September 1993 and has cerebral palsy. He attended Gold Creek School, Canberra. Sawyer was originally coached by Chris Timson and resides in Canberra, Australian Capital Territory. He holds a Certificate III in Hospitality.

== Sporting career ==
In 2011, Sawyer competed in the Australian Athletics Championships where he won a gold and bronze in javelin and shot put. Sawyer competed in the men's javelin events and shot put in the 2012 Australian Athletics Championships in Melbourne he won gold and came 4th respectively. At the 2013 Australian Athletics Championships, in Sydney, Sawyer won gold in the men's ambulant javelin throw event.

Sawyer qualified for the F37/38 javelin throw and F38 shot put 2013 IPC Athletics World Championships in Lyon, where he won bronze and came sixth respectively.

Sawyer won gold in the men's ambulant javelin throw at the 2014 Australian Athletics Championships in Melbourne by throwing the javelin 42.58m. In Brisbane at the 2015 Australian Athletics Championships Sawyer won gold in the T/F38 men's ambulant javelin.

At the 2015 IPC Athletics World Championships in Doha, he finished fourth in the Men's Javelin F38 with a personal best throw of personal best of 45.78m. .

At the 2016 Rio Paralympics, Sawyer finished fifth in the Men's Javelin F38 with a throw of 45.63.

Sawyer won the gold medal in the Men's Javelin F38 with a world record throw of 52.96m at the 2017 World Para Athletics Championships in London, England. The throw was a personal best by 4.5m.

At the 2019 World Para Athletics Championships in Dubai, he came fifth in the Men's Javelin F38.

Sawyer then competed at the 2020 Tokyo Paralympics, coming 7th in the Javelin F38.

He is coached by Mike Barber.

== Recognition ==
In 2008 Sawyer was awarded the Most Outstanding Junior Athlete with a Disability by North Canberra Gungahlin Athletics.

Between 2013 and 2014 Sawyer was given a dAIS athlete grant by the Australian Institute of Sport. In 2014 and 2015 Sawyer was a given a further dAIS athlete grant by the Australian Institute of Sport.

Sawyer was nominated by ACT Athletics for the 2013/14 Outstanding athlete track and field in the open male Athlete with a Disability category. In addition he was nominated for the Mick Dowling Trophy Outstanding Athlete with a Disability and for the Global Award Athlete of the Year.

He was a Laurel Wreath recipient at Athletics ACT for the 2013/14 season. In December 2017, Sawyer was awarded the Canberra Sport Awards Para Athlete of the Year.
