= Italy at the 2020 Summer Olympics =

- IOC code: ITA
- NOC: Italian National Olympic Committee
- Website: www.coni.it (in Italian)

in Tokyo, Japan 23 July 2021 – 8 August 2021
- Competitors: 381 in 28 sports
- Flag bearers (opening): Jessica Rossi; Elia Viviani
- Flag bearer (closing): Marcell Jacobs
- Medals Ranked 10th: Gold 10 Silver 10 Bronze 20 Total 40

Summer Olympics appearances (overview)
- 1896; 1900; 1904; 1908; 1912; 1920; 1924; 1928; 1932; 1936; 1948; 1952; 1956; 1960; 1964; 1968; 1972; 1976; 1980; 1984; 1988; 1992; 1996; 2000; 2004; 2008; 2012; 2016; 2020; 2024; 2028

Other related appearances
- 1906 Intercalated Games

Italy competed at the 2020 Summer Olympics in Tokyo. Originally scheduled to take place from 24 July to 9 August 2020, the Games were postponed to 23 July to 8 August 2021, because of the COVID-19 pandemic. Italian athletes have appeared in every Summer Olympics edition of the modern era, with the disputed exception of the 1904 Summer Olympics in St. Louis where one Italian may have participated.

The Italian National Olympic Committee will reward the gold medalists with €180,000, the silver medalists with €90,000 and the bronze medalists with €60,000.

Italy competed in all sports except badminton, field hockey, football, handball and rugby sevens.

Italy has ended the 2020 Summer Olympics winning 10 gold, 10 silver and 20 bronze medals, setting a new record in number of medals won (36 medals was first reached in the Los Angeles Olympics of 1932, and then again in the Rome Olympics of 1960). Moreover, for the first time the country has received at least one medal in each day.

== Medalists ==
Medal	Name	Sport	Event	Date
Gold	Vito Dell'Aquila	Taekwondo	Men's 58 kg	24 July
Gold	Valentina Rodini; Federica Cesarini	Rowing	Women's lightweight double sculls	29 July
Gold	Gianmarco Tamberi	Athletics	Men's high jump	1 August
Gold	Marcell Jacobs	Athletics	Men's 100 metres	1 August
Gold	Ruggero Tita; Caterina Banti	Sailing	Mixed Nacra 17	3 August
Gold	Simone Consonni; Filippo Ganna; Francesco Lamon; Jonathan Milan	Cycling	Men's team pursuit	4 August
Gold	Massimo Stano	Athletics	Men's 20 kilometres walk	5 August
Gold	Antonella Palmisano	Athletics	Women's 20 kilometres walk	6 August
Gold	Luigi Busà	Karate	Men's 75 kg	6 August
Gold	Eseosa Desalu; Marcell Jacobs; Lorenzo Patta; Filippo Tortu	Athletics	Men's 4 × 100 metres relay	6 August
Silver	Luigi Samele	Fencing	Men's sabre	24 July
Silver	Thomas Ceccon; Santo Condorelli^{[a]} Manuel Frigo; Alessandro Miressi; Lorenzo Zazzeri	Swimming	Men's 4 × 100 metre freestyle relay	26 July
Silver	Diana Bacosi	Shooting	Women's skeet	26 July
Silver	Daniele Garozzo	Fencing	Men's foil	26 July
Silver	Giorgia Bordignon	Weightlifting	Women's 64 kg	27 July
Silver	Luca Curatoli; Luigi Samele; Enrico Berrè; Aldo Montano	Fencing	Men's team sabre	28 July
Silver	Gregorio Paltrinieri	Swimming	Men's 800 metre freestyle	29 July
Silver	Mauro Nespoli	Archery	Men's individual	31 July
Silver	Vanessa Ferrari	Gymnastics	Women's floor	2 August
Silver	Manfredi Rizza	Canoeing	Men's K-1 200 metres	5 August
Bronze	Elisa Longo Borghini	Cycling	Women's individual road race	25 July
Bronze	Odette Giuffrida	Judo	Women's 52 kg	25 July
Bronze	Mirko Zanni	Weightlifting	Men's 67 kg	25 July
Bronze	Nicolò Martinenghi	Swimming	Men's 100 metre breaststroke	26 July
Bronze	Maria Centracchio	Judo	Women's 63 kg	27 July
Bronze	Rossella Fiamingo; Federica Isola; Mara Navarria; Alberta Santuccio	Fencing	Women's team épée	27 July
Bronze	Matteo Castaldo; Marco Di Costanzo; Bruno Rosetti; Matteo Lodo; Giuseppe Vicino	Rowing	Men's coxless four	28 July
Bronze	Federico Burdisso	Swimming	Men's 200 metre butterfly	28 July
Bronze	Pietro Ruta; Stefano Oppo	Rowing	Men's lightweight double sculls	29 July
Bronze	Martina Batini; Erica Cipressa; Arianna Errigo; Alice Volpi	Fencing	Women's team foil	29 July
Bronze	Lucilla Boari	Archery	Women's individual	30 July
Bronze	Simona Quadarella	Swimming	Women's 800 metre freestyle	31 July
Bronze	Irma Testa	Boxing	Women's featherweight	31 July
Bronze	Antonino Pizzolato	Weightlifting	Men's 81 kg	31 July
Bronze	Federico Burdisso; Thomas Ceccon; Nicolò Martinenghi; Alessandro Miressi	Swimming	Men's 4 × 100 metre medley relay	1 August
Bronze	Gregorio Paltrinieri	Swimming	Men's 10 kilometre open water	5 August
Bronze	Elia Viviani	Cycling	Men's omnium	5 August
Bronze	Viviana Bottaro	Karate	Women's kata	5 August
Bronze	Abraham Conyedo	Wrestling	Men's freestyle 97 kg	7 August
Bronze	Alessia Maurelli; Martina Centofanti; Martina Santandrea; Agnese Duranti; Daniela Mogurean	Gymnastics	Women's rhythmic group all-around	8 August

Medals by sport
Sport	1st place, gold medalist(s)	2nd place, silver medalist(s)	3rd place, bronze medalist(s)	Total
Athletics	5	0	0	5
Cycling	1	0	2	3
Rowing	1	0	2	3
Karate	1	0	1	2
Sailing	1	0	0	1
Taekwondo	1	0	0	1
Fencing	0	3	2	5
Swimming	0	2	5	7
Weightlifting	0	1	2	3
Archery	0	1	1	2
Gymnastics	0	1	1	2
Canoeing	0	1	0	1
Shooting	0	1	0	1
Judo	0	0	2	2
Boxing	0	0	1	1
Wrestling	0	0	1	1
Total	10	10	20	40

Medals by date
Date	1st place, gold medalist(s)	2nd place, silver medalist(s)	3rd place, bronze medalist(s)	Total
24 July	1	1	0	2
25 July	0	0	3	3
26 July	0	3	1	4
27 July	0	1	2	3
28 July	0	1	2	3
29 July	1	1	2	4
30 July	0	0	1	1
31 July	0	1	3	4
1 August	2	0	1	3
2 August	0	1	0	1
3 August	1	0	0	1
4 August	1	0	0	1
5 August	1	1	3	5
6 August	3	0	0	3
7 August	0	0	1	1
8 August	0	0	1	1
Total	10	10	20	40

Medals by gender
Gender	1st place, gold medalist(s)	2nd place, silver medalist(s)	3rd place, bronze medalist(s)	Total
Female	2	3	10	15
Male	7	7	10	24
Mixed	1	0	0	1
Total	10	10	20	40

Multiple medalists
Name	Sport	1st place, gold medalist(s)	2nd place, silver medalist(s)	3rd place, bronze medalist(s)	Total
Marcell Jacobs	Athletics	2	0	0	2
Luigi Samele	Fencing	0	2	0	2
Gregorio Paltrinieri	Swimming	0	1	1	2
Thomas Ceccon	Swimming	0	1	1	2
Alessandro Miressi	Swimming	0	1	1	2
Nicolò Martinenghi	Swimming	0	0	2	2
Federico Burdisso	Swimming	0	0	2	2

== Competitors ==
The following is the list of number of competitors in the Games. Note that reserves in athletics (alternate) are not counted:

Sport	Men	Women	Total
Archery	1	3	4
Artistic swimming	—N/a	8	8
Athletics	41	34	75
Basketball	12	4	16
Boxing	0	4	4
Canoeing	4	3	7
Cycling	15	10	25
Diving	2	4	6
Equestrian	2	3	5
Fencing	9	9	18
Golf	2	2	4
Gymnastics	2	12	14
Judo	4	4	8
Karate	3	2	5
Modern pentathlon	0	2	2
Rowing	13	10	23
Sailing	4	5	9
Shooting	9	5	14
Skateboarding	2	1	3
Softball	—N/a	15	15
Sport climbing	2	1	3
Surfing	1	0	1
Swimming	22	16	38
Table tennis	0	1	1
Taekwondo	2	0	2
Tennis	4	3	7
Triathlon	2	3	5
Volleyball	16	14	30
Water polo	13	0	13
Weightlifting	3	2	5
Wrestling	2	0	2
Total	193	180	373

== Notable moments ==
=== Historical records in 2021 ===
- On 30 July, Lucilla Boari became the first Italian woman to win an Olympic medal in archery, winning the bronze medal in the women's individual.
- On 31 July, Irma Testa became the first Italian woman to win an Olympic medal in boxing, ending with a bronze in the women's featherweight.
- On 1 August, Marcell Jacobs became the first Italian to compete in the 100 metres final and to win the gold medal, with a time of 9.80 seconds, setting a new record for Italian team after 121 years from the first participation in this Olympic discipline.
- On 1 August, Thomas Ceccon, Nicolò Martinenghi, Federico Burdisso and Alessandro Miressi got on podium winning the bronze medal in Men's 4 × 100 metre medley relay, setting the first time an Italian Team's swimmer succeeded in winning an Olympic medal in that event. Previously, on 26 July, both Ceccon and Miressi, along with Lorenzo Zazzeri and Manuel Frigo, succeeded in winning the first Olympic medal for the Italian team in the Men's 4 × 100 metre freestyle relay, ending with a silver medal.
- On 1 August, the high jumper Gianmarco Tamberi became the first Italian man to be on podium of Men's high jump, winning a joint gold medal with Qatar athlete Mutaz Essa Barshim. Overall, he is the second Italian athlete to win an Olympic medal in this sport after Sara Simeoni who won 1 gold and 2 silver medals respectively at the Moscow 1980 (gold), Montreal 1976 (first silver) and Los Angeles 1984 (second silver). Moreover, both Tamberi and Barshim agreed to share the gold medal, after a nail-biting tie between both of them as they cleared 2.37m with identical paths, in a rare instance where the athletes of different nations agreed to share the same medal in the history of Olympics. Barshim in particular was quoted in his post-match presentation asking, "Can we have two golds?", representing one of the Olympic's most memorable moment ever.
- On 2 August, the artistic gymnast Vanessa Ferrari succeeded in winning the silver medal in the women's floor, representing the first individual Olympic medal ever for a female Italian gymnast. It is also the first Olympic medal for Italian women gymnastics in 93 years, since Amsterdam 1928 when Italian Women Team won the silver medal in Women's all-around.
- On 6 August, Italy reached and surpassed its own record for the highest number of Olympic medals won in a single edition. Such record of 36 medals was first reached in the Los Angeles Olympics of 1932, and then again in the Rome Olympics of 1960. Italy ended the Olympics with 40 medals. Moreover, for the first time the country has clinched at least one medal per day.
- After winning no medal at all in 2016, Italy reached its best Olympic performance ever in athletics, winning five gold medals (Gianmarco Tamberi in high jump, Lamont Marcell Jacobs in 100 metres, Massimo Stano and Antonella Palmisano in their respective 20 km racewalking events, and the 4x100 men relay).

== Archery ==
One Italian archer qualified for the men's individual recurve by reaching the quarterfinal stage and obtaining one of the four available spots at the 2019 World Archery Championships in 's-Hertogenbosch, Netherlands. Another Italian archer secured a spot in the women's individual recurve by winning the mixed team title at the 2019 European Games in Minsk, Belarus. Meanwhile, three Italian archers qualified for the women's events by securing the last of three quota places available in the team recurve at the 2021 WA Final Qualification Tournament in Paris, France.

Athlete	Event	Ranking round		Round of 64	Round of 32	Round of 16	Quarterfinals	Semifinals	Final / BM	
Athlete	Event	Score	Seed	Opposition Score	Opposition Score	Opposition Score	Opposition Score	Opposition Score	Opposition Score	Rank
Mauro Nespoli	Men's individual	658	24	Ravnikar (SLO); W 6–0	Gankin (KAZ); W 6–2	D'Almeida (BRA); W 6–0	Unruh (GER); W 6–4	Tang C-c (TPE); W 6–2	Gazoz (TUR); L 4–6	2nd place, silver medalist(s)
Tatiana Andreoli	Women's individual	627	52	Barbelin (FRA); L 2–6	Did not advance					
Lucilla Boari	Women's individual	651	23	Zyzańska (POL); W 6–0	Rebagliati (ITA); W 6–4	Marusava (BLR); W 6–5	Wu Jx (CHN); W 6–2	Osipova (ROC); L 6–0	Brown (USA); W 1–7	3rd place, bronze medalist(s)
Chiara Rebagliati	Women's individual	658	10	Bjerendal (SWE); W 6–2	Boari (ITA); L 4–6	Did not advance				
Tatiana Andreoli; Lucilla Boari; Chiara Rebagliati	Women's team	1936	8	—N/a		Great Britain; W 5–3	South Korea; L 0–6	Did not advance		
Mauro Nespoli; Chiara Rebagliati	Mixed team	1316	11 Q	—N/a		Netherlands; L 0–6	Did not advance			

== Artistic swimming ==
Italy fielded a squad of eight artistic swimmers to compete in both the women's team and duet routine the 2021 FINA Olympic Qualification Tournament in Barcelona, Spain.

Athlete	Event	Technical routine		Free routine (preliminary)			Free routine (final)		
Athlete	Event	Points	Rank	Points	Total (technical + free)	Rank	Points	Total (technical + free)	Rank
Linda Cerruti; Costanza Ferro	Duet	91.1035	6	91.2000	182.3035	6 Q	92.4667	183.5702	6
Beatrice Callegari; Domiziana Cavanna; Linda Cerruti; Francesca Deidda; Costanza Di Camillo; Costanza Ferro; Gemma Galli; Enrica Piccoli	Team	91.3372	6	—N/a			92.8000	184.1372	5

== Athletics ==
On 28 June 2021, La Gazzetta dello Sport announced initially an Italian team of 72 (40 men and 32 women), the largest team ever in athletics. The official composition of the Italian team have been confirmed on 2 July and it reaches finally 76 athletes (41 men and 35 women) without alternate athletes. 2 more qualified athletes have been withdrawn after their qualification. It is the largest team ever, since Los Angeles 1984 (50).

Italian athletes further achieved the qualification, either by entry standard (qualifying time or mark) or by world ranking, in the following track and field events (up to a maximum of 3 athletes in each event).

All the 5 relay teams, also a record for Italy, are qualified by designated competition (5 athletes per each relay team and 4 athletes only, 2 men and 2 women, for the mixed team). The athletes already qualified for 100 m and 400 m shall be part of their respective relay teams.

Key

- Note–Ranks given for track events are within the athlete's heat only
- Q = Qualified for the next round
- q = Qualified for the next round as a fastest loser or, in field events, by position without achieving the qualifying target
- NR = National record
- N/A = Round not applicable for the event
- Bye = Athlete not required to compete in round

Track & road events
Men

Athlete	Event	Heat		Quarterfinal		Semifinal		Final	
Athlete	Event	Result	Rank	Result	Rank	Result	Rank	Result	Rank
Marcell Jacobs	100 m	Bye		9.94 PB	1 Q	9.84	3 q	9.80 AR	1st place, gold medalist(s)
Filippo Tortu	100 m	Bye		10.10	4 q	10.16	7	Did not advance	
Eseosa Desalu	200 m	20.29	3 Q	—N/a		20.43	6	Did not advance	
Antonio Infantino	200 m	20.90	5	—N/a		Did not advance			
Davide Re	400 m	45.46	5 Q	—N/a		44.94	5	Did not advance	
Edoardo Scotti	400 m	45.71	4	—N/a		Did not advance			
Yemaneberhan Crippa	5000 m	13:47.12	15	—N/a				Did not advance	
Yemaneberhan Crippa	10000 m	—N/a						27:54.05	11
Paolo Dal Molin	110 m hurdles	13.44	4 Q	—N/a		13.40	4	Did not advance	
Hassane Fofana	110 m hurdles	13.70	8	—N/a		Did not advance			
Alessandro Sibilio	400 m hurdles	49.11	3 Q	—N/a		47.93	3 Q	48.77	8
Ahmed Abdelwahed	3000 m steeplechase	8:12.71	3 Q	—N/a				8:24.34	14
Ala Zoghlami	3000 m steeplechase	8:14.06	4 Q	—N/a				8:18.50	9
Osama Zoghlami	3000 m steeplechase	8:19.51	4	—N/a				Did not advance	
Eseosa Desalu; Marcell Jacobs; Lorenzo Patta; Filippo Tortu	4 × 100 m relay	37.95 NR	3 Q	—N/a				37.50 NR	1st place, gold medalist(s)
Vladimir Aceti; Davide Re; Edoardo Scotti; Alessandro Sibilio	4 × 400 m relay	2:58.91 NR	4 Q	—N/a				2:58.81 NR	7
Yassine El Fathaoui	Marathon	—N/a						2:19:44	47
Eyob Faniel	Marathon	—N/a						2:15:11	20
Yassine Rachik	Marathon	—N/a						DNF	
Francesco Fortunato	20 km walk	—N/a						1:23:43	15
Massimo Stano	20 km walk	—N/a						1:21:05	1st place, gold medalist(s)
Federico Tontodonati	20 km walk	—N/a						1:31:19	44
Andrea Agrusti	50 km walk	—N/a						4:01:10	23
Teodorico Caporaso	50 km walk	—N/a						DNF	
Marco De Luca	50 km walk	—N/a						DNF	

Women

Athlete	Event	Heat		Quarterfinal		Semifinal		Final	
Athlete	Event	Result	Rank	Result	Rank	Result	Rank	Result	Rank
Anna Bongiorni	100 m	Bye		11.35	3 Q	11.38	8	Did not advance	
Vittoria Fontana	100 m	Bye		11.53	7	Did not advance			
Gloria Hooper	200 m	23.16	4 Q	—N/a		23.28	8	Did not advance	
Dalia Kaddari	200 m	23.26	3 Q	—N/a		23.41	8	Did not advance	
Elena Bellò	800 m	2:01.07	5 q	—N/a		2:02.35	6	Did not advance	
Federica Del Buono	1500 m	4:07.70	11	—N/a		Did not advance			
Gaia Sabbatini	1500 m	4:05.41	4 Q	—N/a		4:02.25 PB	8	Did not advance	
Nadia Battocletti	5000 m	14:55.83	3 Q	—N/a				14:46.29	7
Luminosa Bogliolo	100 m hurdles	12.93	3 Q	—N/a		12.75 NR	4	Did not advance	
Elisa Di Lazzaro	100 m hurdles	13.08	5	—N/a		Did not advance			
Eleonora Marchiando	400 m hurdles	56.82	5	—N/a		Did not advance			
Linda Olivieri	400 m hurdles	55.54 PB	4 Q	—N/a		57.03	7	Did not advance	
Yadisleidy Pedroso	400 m hurdles	55.57 SB	5 Q	—N/a		55.80	5	Did not advance	
Anna Bongiorni; Zaynab Dosso*; Vittoria Fontana; Johanelis Herrera*; Gloria Hooper; Irene Siragusa	4 × 100 m relay	42.84 NR	6	—N/a				Did not advance	
Rebecca Borga; Maria Benedicta Chigbolu; Ayomide Folorunso*; Raphaela Lukudo; Alice Mangione; Eleonora Marchiando; Petra Nardelli; Anna Polinari; Giancarla Trevisan*	4 × 400 m relay	3:27.74 SB	7	—N/a				Did not advance	
Giovanna Epis	Marathon	—N/a						2:35:09 SB	32
Eleonora Giorgi	20 km walk	—N/a						1:46:36	52
Antonella Palmisano	20 km walk	—N/a						1:29:12	1st place, gold medalist(s)
Valentina Trapletti	20 km walk	—N/a						1:33:12	18

Mixed

Athlete	Event	Heat		Final	
Athlete	Event	Result	Rank	Result	Rank
Vladimir Aceti; Edoardo Scotti; Rebecca Borga; Alice Mangione	4 × 400 m relay	3:13.51	5	Did not advance	

Field events
Men

Athlete	Event	Qualification		Final	
Athlete	Event	Distance	Position	Distance	Position
Filippo Randazzo	Long jump	8.10	6 q	7.99	8
Tobia Bocchi	Triple jump	16.78	13	Did not advance	
Andrea Dallavalle	Triple jump	16.99	7 Q	16.85	9
Emmanuel Ihemeje	Triple jump	16.88	9 Q	16.52	11
Stefano Sottile	High jump	2.17	=26	Did not advance	
Gianmarco Tamberi	High jump	2.28	9 q	2.37	1st place, gold medalist(s)
Claudio Stecchi	Pole vault	NM	—	Did not advance	
Leonardo Fabbri	Shot put	20.80	14	Did not advance	
Nick Ponzio	Shot put	20.28	20	Did not advance	
Zane Weir	Shot put	21.25	5 Q	21.41	5 PB
Giovanni Faloci	Discus throw	57.33	29	Did not advance	

Women

Athlete	Event	Qualification		Final	
Athlete	Event	Distance	Position	Distance	Position
Dariya Derkach	Triple jump	13.90	21	Did not advance	
Alessia Trost	High jump	1.90	20	Did not advance	
Elena Vallortigara	High jump	1.93	16	Did not advance	
Roberta Bruni	Pole vault	4.25	24	Did not advance	
Elisa Molinarolo	Pole vault	4.40	18	Did not advance	
Daisy Osakue	Discus throw	63.66	5 Q	59.97	12
Sara Fantini	Hammer throw	71.68	12 q	69.10	12

== Basketball ==
=== Men's tournament ===
At the 2020 FIBA Men's Olympic Qualifying Tournament, held in Belgrad, Serbia, Italy men's team qualified, beating Serbia 102 to 95 on 4 July 2021. It is the Italian return to Olympics after 17 years, Athens 2004.

Team roster

The roster was announced on 6 July 2021.

Italy national basketball team roster
Players
Coaches

Pos.	No.	Name	Age – Date of birth	Height	Club	Ctr.
PG	0	Marco Spissu	26 – 5 February 1995	1.84 m (6 ft 0 in)	Dinamo Sassari	(Italy)
G	1	Nico Mannion	20 – 14 March 2001	1.90 m (6 ft 3 in)	Golden State Warriors	(United States)
G	7	Stefano Tonut	27 – 7 November 1993	1.94 m (6 ft 4 in)	Reyer Venezia	(Italy)
PF	8	Danilo Gallinari	32 – 8 August 1988	2.08 m (6 ft 10 in)	Atlanta Hawks	(United States)
PF	9	Nicolò Melli (C)	30 – 26 January 1991	2.05 m (6 ft 9 in)	Dallas Mavericks	(United States)
F	13	Simone Fontecchio	25 – 9 December 1995	2.03 m (6 ft 8 in)	Alba Berlin	(Germany)
C	16	Amedeo Tessitori	26 – 7 October 1994	2.08 m (6 ft 10 in)	Virtus Bologna	(Italy)
PF	17	Giampaolo Ricci	29 – 27 September 1991	2.01 m (6 ft 7 in)	Virtus Bologna	(Italy)
G	24	Riccardo Moraschini	30 – 8 January 1991	1.93 m (6 ft 4 in)	Olimpia Milano	(Italy)
SF	31	Michele Vitali	29 – 31 October 1991	1.96 m (6 ft 5 in)	Brose Bamberg	(Germany)
F	33	Achille Polonara	29 – 23 November 1991	2.05 m (6 ft 9 in)	Saski Baskonia	(Spain)
PG	54	Alessandro Pajola	21 – 9 November 1999	1.94 m (6 ft 4 in)	Virtus Bologna	(Italy)

Head coach

- (Italy) Meo Sacchetti

Assistant coach(es)

- (Italy) Piero Bucchi
- (Italy) Riccardo Fois
- (Italy) Paolo Galbiati
- (Italy) Emanuele Molin

Legend

- Club – describes last
  club before the competition
- Age – describes age
  on 25 July 2021

Group play

Pos	Team	Pld	W	L	PF	PA	PD	Pts	Qualification
1	Australia	3	3	0	259	226	+33	6	Quarterfinals
2	Italy	3	2	1	255	239	+16	5	Quarterfinals
3	Germany	3	1	2	257	273	−16	4	Quarterfinals
4	Nigeria	3	0	3	230	263	−33	3	

Source: TOCOG and FIBA
Rules for classification: 1) classification points; 2) head-to-head results; 3) head-to-head game points difference; 4) head-to-head number of game points scored.

25 July 2021
13:40
v

Boxscore

Germany	82–92	Italy
Scoring by quarter: 32–22, 14–21, 26–25, 10–24
Pts: Lô 24; Rebs: Voigtmann 6 Asts: three players 4		Pts: Fontecchio 20; Rebs: Melli 9 Asts: Mannion 7

Saitama Super Arena, Saitama
Referees: Antonio Conde (ESP), Ahmed Al-Shuwaili (IRQ), Yevgeniy Mikheyev (KAZ)

28 July 2021
17:20
v

Boxscore

Italy	83–86	Australia
Scoring by quarter: 25–25, 20–19, 17–21, 21–21
Pts: Fontecchio 22; Rebs: Polonara 7 Asts: Mannion 7		Pts: Landale 18; Rebs: three players 7 Asts: Ingles, Mills 5

Saitama Super Arena, Saitama
Referees: Michael Weiland (CAN), Steven Anderson (USA), Ahmed Al-Shuwaili (IRQ)

31 July 2021
13:40
v

Boxscore

Italy	80–71	Nigeria
Scoring by quarter: 29–17, 11–22, 16–24, 24–8
Pts: Melli 15; Rebs: Vitali 6 Asts: Fontecchio, Pajola 4		Pts: Metu 22; Rebs: Metu 10; Asts: Metu 3

Saitama Super Arena, Saitama
Referees: Antonio Conde (ESP), Roberto Vázquez (PUR), Takaki Kato (JPN)

Quarterfinal

3 August 2021
17:20
v

Boxscore

Italy	75–84	France
Scoring by quarter: 25–20, 17–23, 12–21, 21–20
Pts: Fontecchio 23; Rebs: Gallinari 10; Asts: Pajola 6		Pts: Gobert 22; Rebs: Batum 14; Asts: De Colo 7

Saitama Super Arena, Saitama
Referees: Roberto Vázquez (PUR), Juan Fernández (ARG), Steven Anderson (USA)

=== 3×3 basketball ===
Summary

Team	Event	Group stage								Quarterfinal	Semifinal	Final / BM	
Team	Event	Opposition Score	Opposition Score	Opposition Score	Opposition Score	Opposition Score	Opposition Score	Opposition Score	Rank	Opposition Score	Opposition Score	Opposition Score	Rank
Italy women's 3×3	Women's 3×3 tournament	Mongolia; W 15–14	France; L 16–19	Romania; W 22–14	China; L 13–22	Japan; L 10–22	United States; L 13–17	ROC; L 9–17	6	China; L 13–19	Did not advance		

==== Women's tournament ====
Italy women's national 3x3 team qualified directly for the Olympics by winning the 2020 FIBA Universality Olympic Qualifying Tournament.

Team roster

- Chiara Consolini
- Rae Lin D'Alie
- Marcella Filippi
- Giulia Rulli

Group play

Pos	Team	Pld	W	L	PF	PA	PD	Qualification
1	United States	7	6	1	136	98	+38	Semifinals
2	ROC	7	5 (Note: ROC 2–0, China 1–1, Japan 0–2)	2	129	90	+39	Semifinals
3	China	7	5	2	127	97	+30	Quarterfinals
4	Japan (H)	7	5	2	130	97	+33	Quarterfinals
5	France	7	4	3	118	116	+2	Quarterfinals
6	Italy	7	2	5	98	125	−27	Quarterfinals
7	Romania	7	1	6	89	142	−53	
8	Mongolia	7	0	7	79	141	−62	

Source: TOCOG and FIBA
Rules for classification: 1) Wins; 2) Head-to-head record; 3) Points scored.
(H) Hosts
Notes:

24 July 2021
17:30
v

Report

Italy	15–14	Mongolia
Pts: D'Alie 8		Pts: Solongo 7

Aomi Urban Sports Park, Tokyo
Referees: Shi Qirong (CHN), Vlad Ghizdareanu (ROU)

24 July 2021
21:25
v

Report

France	19–16	Italy
Pts: Filip, Guapo 6		Pts: D'Alie 8

Aomi Urban Sports Park, Tokyo
Referees: Shi Qirong (CHN), Jasmina Juras (SRB)

25 July 2021
10:40
v

Report

Romania	14–22	Italy
Pts: Mărginean 6		Pts: D'Alie 13

Aomi Urban Sports Park, Tokyo
Referees: Su Yu-yen (TPE), Evgeny Ostrovskiy (RUS)

25 July 2021
14:25
v

Report

China	22–13	Italy
Pts: Zhang 8		Pts: D'Alie 6

Aomi Urban Sports Park, Tokyo
Referees: Cecília Tóth (HUN), Evgeny Ostrovskiy (RUS)

26 July 2021
14:25
v

Report

Italy	10–22	Japan
Pts: Consolini 4		Pts: Mawuli 8

Aomi Urban Sports Park, Tokyo
Referees: Cecília Tóth (HUN), Su Yu-yen (TPE)

26 July 2021
17:55
v

Report

Italy	13–17	United States
Pts: D'Alie, Rulli 4		Pts: Dolson, Gray 6

Aomi Urban Sports Park, Tokyo
Referees: Shi Qirong (CHN), Vlad Ghizdareanu (ROU)

27 July 2021
17:25
v

Report

ROC	17–9	Italy
Pts: O. Frolkina 6		Pts: Rulli 5

Aomi Urban Sports Park, Tokyo
Referees: Marek Maliszewski (POL), Vanessa Devlin (AUS)

Quarterfinal

27 July 2021
20:30
v

Report

China	19–13	Italy
Pts: Wang 11		Pts: Consolini, D'Alie 5

Aomi Urban Sports Park, Tokyo
Referees: Vanessa Devlin (AUS), Vlad Ghizdareanu (ROU)

== Boxing ==
Italy entered four female boxers into the Olympic tournament. Giordana Sorrentino (women's flyweight), Rio 2016 Olympian Irma Testa (women's featherweight), Rebecca Nicoli (women's lightweight), and 2019 world silver medalist Angela Carini (women's welterweight) secured the spots on the Italian squad in their respective weight divisions, either by winning the round of 16 match, advancing to the semifinal match, or scoring a box-off triumph, at the 2020 European Qualification Tournament in Villebon-sur-Yvette, France.

Athlete	Event	Round of 32	Round of 16	Quarterfinals	Semifinals	Final / BM	
Athlete	Event	Opposition Result	Opposition Result	Opposition Result	Opposition Result	Opposition Result	Rank
Giordana Sorrentino	Women's flyweight	Cardozo (VEN); W 5–0	Huang H-w (TPE); L 0–5	Did not advance			
Irma Testa	Women's featherweight	Vorontsova (ROC); W 4–1	Walsh (IRL); W 5–0	Veyre (CAN); W 5–0	Petecio (PHI); L 1–4	Did not advance	3rd place, bronze medalist(s)
Rebecca Nicoli	Women's lightweight	Falcón (MEX); W 4–1	Harrington (IRL); L 5–0	Did not advance			
Angela Carini	Women's welterweight	Bye	Chen N-c (TPE); L 2–3	Did not advance			

== Canoeing ==
=== Slalom ===
Italian canoeists qualified one boat for each of the following classes through the 2019 ICF Canoe Slalom World Championships in La Seu d'Urgell, Spain. The slalom canoeists, highlighted by Rio 2016 Olympians Giovanni De Gennaro and Stefanie Horn were named to the Italian roster for the Games on 22 June 2021.

Athlete	Event	Preliminary						Semifinal		Final	
Athlete	Event	Run 1	Rank	Run 2	Rank	Best	Rank	Time	Rank	Time	Rank
Giovanni De Gennaro	Men's K-1	90.92	1	90.65	2	90.65	2 Q	100.23	14	Did not advance	
Marta Bertoncelli	Women's C-1	121.83	13	113.91	8	113.91	10 Q	145.71	15	Did not advance	
Stefanie Horn	Women's K-1	109.82	9	104.79	4	104.79	4 Q	108.52	4 Q	106.93	4

=== Sprint ===
Italian canoeists qualified two boats in each of the following distances for the Games through the 2019 ICF Canoe Sprint World Championships in Szeged, Hungary. The sprint canoeing team was named to the Italian roster for the Games on 22 June 2021, including Rio 2016 Olympian Manfredi Rizza.

Athlete	Event	Heats		Quarterfinals		Semifinals		Final	
Athlete	Event	Time	Rank	Time	Rank	Time	Rank	Time	Rank
Manfredi Rizza	Men's K-1 200 m	34.867	1 SF	Bye		35.171	2 FA	35.080	2nd place, silver medalist(s)
Luca Beccaro; Samuele Burgo	Men's K-2 1000 m	3:28.047	4 QF	3:12.667	3 SF	3:20.591	5 FB	3:22.408	11
Francesca Genzo	Women's K-1 200 m	42.198	2 SF	Bye		40.000	4 FA	40.184	7

Qualification Legend: FA = Qualify to final (medal); FB = Qualify to final B (non-medal)

== Cycling ==
=== Road ===
Italy entered a squad of nine riders (five men and four women) to compete in their respective Olympic road races, by virtue of their top 50 national finish (for men) and top 22 (for women) in the UCI World Ranking.

Men

Athlete	Event	Time	Rank
Alberto Bettiol	Road race	6:09:04	14
Alberto Bettiol	Time trial	57:38.06	11
Damiano Caruso	Road race	6:11:46	24
Giulio Ciccone	Road race	6:16:53	60
Filippo Ganna	Time trial	56:09.93	5
Gianni Moscon	Road race	6:09:04	20
Vincenzo Nibali	Road race	6:16:53	53

Women

Athlete	Event	Time	Rank
Marta Bastianelli	Road race	4:02:16	44
Marta Cavalli	Road race	3:54:31	8
Elisa Longo Borghini	Road race	3:54:14	3rd place, bronze medalist(s)
Elisa Longo Borghini	Time trial	33:00.89	10
Soraya Paladin	Road race	4:08:40	48

=== Track ===
Following the completion of the 2020 UCI Track Cycling World Championships, Italian riders accumulated spots for both men and women in team pursuit, omnium, and madison, based on their country's results in the final UCI Olympic rankings.

Pursuit

Athlete	Event	Qualification		Semifinals		Final	
Athlete	Event	Time	Rank	Opponent Results	Rank	Opponent Results	Rank
Simone Consonni; Filippo Ganna; Francesco Lamon; Jonathan Milan	Men's team pursuit	3:45.895	2 Q	New Zealand; W 3:42.307 WR	1	Denmark; W 3:42.032 WR	1st place, gold medalist(s)
Martina Alzini; Rachele Barbieri; Martina Fidanza; Vittoria Guazzini; Letizia Paternoster	Women's team pursuit	4:11.666	4 Q	Germany; L 4:10.063	6	Australia; L 4:11.108	6

Omnium

Athlete	Event	Scratch race		Tempo race		Elimination race		Points race		Total points	Rank
Athlete	Event	Rank	Points	Rank	Points	Rank	Points	Rank	Points	Total points	Rank
Elia Viviani	Men's omnium	13	16	8	26	1	40	42	4	124	3rd place, bronze medalist(s)
Elisa Balsamo	Women's omnium	DNF	16	10	22	15	12	10	0	50	14

Madison

Athlete	Event	Points	Laps	Rank
Simone Consonni; Elia Viviani	Men's madison	−9	100	10
Elisa Balsamo; Letizia Paternoster	Women's madison	2	120	8

=== Mountain biking ===
Italian mountain bikers qualified for four quota places (three men's and one women's) into the Olympic cross-country race, as a result of the nation's runner-up finish for men and ninth for women in the UCI Olympic Ranking List of 16 May 2021.

Athlete	Event	Time	Rank
Luca Braidot	Men's cross-country	1:31:30	25
Nadir Colledani	Men's cross-country	LAP (1 lap)	34
Gerhard Kerschbaumer	Men's cross-country	1:29:48	20
Eva Lechner	Women's cross-country	1:26:26	25

=== BMX ===
Italy received a single quota place for BMX at the Olympics by topping the field of nations vying for qualification in the men's race at the 2019 UCI BMX World Championships.

Race

Athlete	Event	Quarterfinal		Semifinal		Final	
Athlete	Event	Points	Rank	Points	Rank	Result	Rank
Giacomo Fantoni	Men's race	14	5	Did not advance			

== Diving ==
Italian divers qualified for three individual spots and two synchronized teams at the Games through the 2019 FINA World Championships and the 2021 FINA Diving World Cup.

Men

Athlete	Event	Preliminary		Semifinal		Final	
Athlete	Event	Points	Rank	Points	Rank	Points	Rank
Lorenzo Marsaglia	3 metre springboard	369.60	20	Did not advance			
Lorenzo Marsaglia; Giovanni Tocci	3 m synchronized springboard	—N/a				388.05	6

Women

Athlete	Event	Preliminary		Semifinal		Final	
Athlete	Event	Points	Rank	Points	Rank	Points	Rank
Noemi Batki	10 m platform	226.95	27	Did not advance			
Sarah Jodoin Di Maria	10 m platform	291.05	15 Q	294.00	14	Did not advance	
Elena Bertocchi; Chiara Pellacani	3 m synchronized springboard	—N/a				267.48	7

== Equestrian ==
Italy fielded a squad of three equestrian riders into the Olympic team eventing competition by securing an outright berth as one of the two top-ranked nations, not yet qualified, at the 2019 European Championships (for Groups A and B) in Luhmühlen, Germany. Meanwhile, one jumping rider was added to the Italian roster by finishing in the top two, outside the group selection, of the individual FEI Olympic Rankings for Groups B (South Western Europe).

=== Dressage ===
Following the withdrawal of Norway, Italy received a reallocation to compete in the individual dressage competition.

Athlete	Horse	Event	Grand Prix		Grand Prix Freestyle		Overall	
Athlete	Horse	Event	Score	Rank	Technical	Artistic	Score	Rank
Francesco Zaza	Wispering Romance	Individual	66.941	43	Did not advance			

Qualification Legend: Q = Qualified for the final; q = Qualified for the final as a lucky loser

=== Eventing ===
Stefano Brecciaroli and Bolivar Gio Granno have been named the travelling alternates.

Athlete	Horse	Event	Dressage		Cross-country			Jumping						Total	
Athlete	Horse	Event	Dressage		Cross-country			Qualifier			Final			Total	
Athlete	Horse	Event	Penalties	Rank	Penalties	Total	Rank	Penalties	Total	Rank	Penalties	Total	Rank	Penalties	Rank
Susanna Bordone	Imperial van de Holtakkers	Individual	33.90	36	11.00	44.90	29	0.00	44.90	22 Q	11.00	50.50	18	50.50	18
Vittoria Panizzon	Super Cillious	Individual	38.60	52	3.60	42.20	25	8.00	50.20	27	Did not advance			50.20	27
Arianna Schivo	Quefira de l'Ormeau	Individual	42.90	58	2.80	45.70	28	4.00	49.70	26	Did not advance			49.70	26
Susanna Bordone; Vittoria Panizzon; Arianna Schivo	See above	Team	115.40	15	17.40	132.80	7	12.00	144.80	7	—N/a			144.80	7

=== Jumping ===
Athlete	Horse	Event	Qualification		Final		
Athlete	Horse	Event	Penalties	Rank	Penalties	Time	Rank
Emanuele Gaudiano	Chalou	Individual	9	=47	Did not advance		

== Fencing ==
Italian fencers qualified a full squad each in the team foil, team sabre, and the men's team épée at the Games, by finishing among the top four nations in the FIE Olympic Team Rankings, while the women's épée team claimed the spot as the highest-ranked nation from the European zone outside the world's top four. It is the first Olympics ever where Italy will have a team in all events.

The fencing team was officially selected to the Italian roster for the Games on 11 June 2021, with three-time medalist Andrea Cassarà in the men's foil remarkably going to his fifth straight Games. Notable fencers also featured the defending champion Daniele Garozzo in the men's foil, Rio 2016 silver medalist Rossella Fiamingo in the women's épée, and London 2012 silver medalist Arianna Errigo in the women's foil.

Men

Athlete	Event	Round of 64	Round of 32	Round of 16	Quarterfinal	Semifinal	Final / BM	
Athlete	Event	Opposition Score	Opposition Score	Opposition Score	Opposition Score	Opposition Score	Opposition Score	Rank
Marco Fichera	Épée	Bye	Kurbanov (KAZ); L 7–15	Did not advance				
Enrico Garozzo	Épée	Bye	Kano (JPN); L 12–15	Did not advance				
Andrea Santarelli	Épée	Bye	Khodos (ROC); W 15–10	Bardenet (FRA); W 15–11	Yamada (JPN); W 15–13	Siklósi (HUN); L 10–15	Reizlin (UKR); L 12–15	4
Marco Fichera; Enrico Garozzo; Andrea Santarelli; Gabriele Cimini	Team épée	—N/a		Bye	ROC; L 34–45	Classification semifinal Ukraine; L 39–45	Seventh place final Switzerland; W 36–34	7
Andrea Cassarà	Foil	Bye	Schenkel (CAN); W 15–11	Hamza (EGY); L 13–15	Did not advance			
Alessio Foconi	Foil	Bye	Sanità (GER); W 15–8	Cheung (HKG); L 3–15	Did not advance			
Daniele Garozzo	Foil	Bye	Hassan (EGY); W 15–6	Matsuyama (JPN); W 15–14	Lefort (FRA); W 15–10	Shikine (JPN); W 15–9	Cheung K-l (HKG); L 15–11	2nd place, silver medalist(s)
Andrea Cassarà; Alessio Foconi; Daniele Garozzo; Giorgio Avola	Team foil	—N/a		Bye	Japan; L 43–45	Did not advance		
Enrico Berrè	Sabre	Bye	Ferjani (TUN); W 15–10	Teodosiu (ROU); W 15–12	Samele (ITA); L 10–15	Did not advance		
Luca Curatoli	Sabre	Bye	Teodosiu (ROU); L 13–15	Did not advance				
Luigi Samele	Sabre	Bye	Xu Ym (CHN); W 15–12	Rahbari (IRI); W 15–7	Berrè (ITA); W 15–10	Kim J-h (KOR); W 15–12	Szilágyi (HUN); L 7–15	2nd place, silver medalist(s)
Enrico Berrè; Luca Curatoli; Luigi Samele; Aldo Montano^{[b]}	Team sabre	—N/a		Bye	Iran; W 45–44	Hungary; W 45–43	South Korea; L 26–45	2nd place, silver medalist(s)

^{b} Because of physical injury, Samele could not compete in the semifinal against the Hungarian team and was replaced by Montano, who also competed in the final against South Korea.

Women

Athlete	Event	Round of 64	Round of 32	Round of 16	Quarterfinal	Semifinal	Final / BM	
Athlete	Event	Opposition Score	Opposition Score	Opposition Score	Opposition Score	Opposition Score	Opposition Score	Rank
Rossella Fiamingo	Épée	Bye	Moellhausen (BRA); W 10–9	Jarecka (POL); W 15–13	Lehis (EST); L 15–7	Did not advance		
Federica Isola	Épée	Bye	Besbes (TUN); W 14–12	Lin S (CHN); W 15–9	Sun Yw (CHN); L 10–11	Did not advance		
Mara Navarria	Épée	Bye	Lichagina (ROC); W 15–12	Lehis (EST); L 10–15	Did not advance			
Rossella Fiamingo; Federica Isola; Mara Navarria; Alberta Santuccio	Team épée	—N/a			ROC; W 33–31	Estonia; L 34–42	China; W 23–21	3rd place, bronze medalist(s)
Martina Batini	Foil	Bye	Kreiss (HUN); L 10–15	Did not advance				
Arianna Errigo	Foil	Bye	El-Sharkawy (EGY); W 15–2	Guo (CAN); W 15–8	Volpi (ITA); L 7–15	Did not advance		
Alice Volpi	Foil	Bye	Kondricz (HUN); W 15–5	Ebert (GER); W 15–13	Errigo (ITA); W 15–7	Deriglazova (ROC); L 10–15	Korobeynikova (ROC); L 14–15	4
Martina Batini; Arianna Errigo; Alice Volpi; Erica Cipressa^{[c]}	Team foil	—N/a			Hungary; W 45–32	France; L 43–45	United States; W 45–23	3rd place, bronze medalist(s)
Martina Criscio	Sabre	Bye	Yoon J-s (KOR); L 11–15	Did not advance				
Rossella Gregorio	Sabre	Bye	Pozdniakova (ROC); L 12–15	Did not advance				
Irene Vecchi	Sabre	Bye	Lembach (FRA); W 15–11	Velikaya (ROC); L 15–12	Did not advance			
Martina Criscio; Rossella Gregorio; Irene Vecchi; Michela Battiston	Team sabre	—N/a		Bye	China; W 45–41	France; L 39–45	South Korea; L 42–45	4

^{c} Cipressa replaced Batini in the bronze medal match against the American team.

== Golf ==
Italy entered two male and two female golfers into the Olympic tournament. Guido Migliozzi (world no. 72) and Francesco Molinari (world no. 133) qualified directly among the top 60 eligible players for the men's event based on the IGF World Rankings of 20 June 2021. Molinari later withdrew thorough injury and was replaced by Renato Paratore.

Athlete	Event	Round 1	Round 2	Round 3	Round 4	Total		
Athlete	Event	Score	Score	Score	Score	Score	Par	Rank
Guido Migliozzi	Men's	71	65	68	72	276	−8	=32
Renato Paratore	Men's	71	70	67	67	275	−9	=27
Giulia Molinaro	Women's	75	71	70	70	286	+2	=46
Lucrezia Colombotto Rosso	Women's	75	74	75	78	302	+18	59

== Gymnastics ==
=== Artistic ===
Italy fielded a full squad of seven gymnasts (two men and five women) into the Olympic competition. The women's squad finished fifth out of nine nations eligible for qualification in the team all-around to assure its Olympic berth at the 2019 World Artistic Gymnastics Championships in Stuttgart, Germany. On the men's side, Rio 2016 Olympian Ludovico Edalli and rookie Marco Lodadio booked their spots in the individual all-around and apparatus events at the same tournament, with the latter bagging the silver medal in the rings exercise. Vanessa Ferrari initially qualified as an individual; however, Giorgia Villa's injury resulted in Ferrari's placement on the team. As a result, teammate Lara Mori took the individual berth.

Men

Athlete	Events	Qualification								Final							
Athlete	Events	Apparatus						Total	Rank	Apparatus						Total	Rank
Athlete	Events	F	PH	R	V	PB	HB	Total	Rank	F	PH	R	V	PB	HB	Total	Rank
Ludovico Edalli	All-around	13.733	13.600	13.333	13.666	13.166	13.766	81.231	38	Did not advance							
Marco Lodadio	Rings	—N/a		14.633	—N/a			14.633	9	Did not advance							

Women
Team

Athlete	Event	Qualification						Final					
Athlete	Event	Apparatus				Total	Rank	Apparatus				Total	Rank
Athlete	Event	V	UB	BB	F	Total	Rank	V	UB	BB	F	Total	Rank
Alice D'Amato	Team	14.333	14.233	12.600	13.033	54.199	20 Q	14.166	14.166	13.133	13.100	—N/a	
Asia D'Amato	Team	14.233	13.933	13.133	11.833	53.132	34	14.266	13.900	12.900	13.166	—N/a	
Vanessa Ferrari	Team	14.167	—N/a	12.500	14.166 Q	—N/a		14.233	—N/a		14.100	—N/a	
Martina Maggio	Team	14.067	13.700	13.066	12.733	53.566	27 Q	—N/a	13.433	13.075	—N/a	—N/a	
Total	Team	42.733	41.866	38.799	39.932	163.330	7 Q	42.665	41.499	39.108	40.366	163.638	4

Individual

Athlete	Event	Qualification						Final					
Athlete	Event	Apparatus				Total	Rank	Apparatus				Total	Rank
Athlete	Event	V	UB	BB	F	Total	Rank	V	UB	BB	F	Total	Rank
Alice D'Amato	All-around	See team results						14.300	13.000	11.633	12.966	51.899	20
Vanessa Ferrari	Floor	—N/a			14.166	14.166	1 Q	—N/a			14.200	14.200	2nd place, silver medalist(s)
Martina Maggio	All-around	See team results						14.033	12.466	13.066	13.000	52.565	19
Lara Mori	Balance beam	—N/a		12.133	—N/a	12.133	62	Did not advance					
Lara Mori	Floor	—N/a			13.400	13.400	19	Did not advance					

=== Rhythmic ===
Italy qualified a squad of rhythmic gymnasts for the group all-around by virtue of a top-three finish at the 2018 World Championships in Sofia. Two more rhythmic gymnasts were added to the roster by finishing in the top sixteen of the individual all-around at the 2019 World Championships in Baku, Azerbaijan.

Athlete	Event	Qualification						Final					
Athlete	Event	Hoop	Ball	Clubs	Ribbon	Total	Rank	Hoop	Ball	Clubs	Ribbon	Total	Rank
Alexandra Agiurgiuculese	Individual	22.050	25.600	24.150	19.250	91.050	15	Did not advance					
Milena Baldassarri	Individual	24.550	25.700	25.650	20.150	96.050	6 Q	25.100	25.625	26.300	22.400	99.625	6

Athletes	Event	Qualification				Final			
Athletes	Event	5 apps	3+2 apps	Total	Rank	5 apps.	3+2 apps	Total	Rank
Martina Centofanti; Agnese Duranti; Alessia Maurelli; Daniela Mogurean; Martina Santandrea	Group	44.600	42.550	87.150	3 Q	44.850	42.850	87.700	3rd place, bronze medalist(s)

== Judo ==
Men

Athlete	Event	Round of 64	Round of 32	Round of 16	Quarterfinals	Semifinals	Repechage	Final / BM	
Athlete	Event	Opposition Result	Opposition Result	Opposition Result	Opposition Result	Opposition Result	Opposition Result	Opposition Result	Rank
Manuel Lombardo	−66 kg	—N/a	Bye	Serikzhanov (KAZ); W 11–00	Cargnin (BRA); L 00–01	—N/a	Yondonperenlei (MGL); W 10–00	An B-u (KOR); L 00–10	5
Fabio Basile	−73 kg	Bye	An C-r (KOR); L 00–01	Did not advance					
Christian Parlati	−81 kg	Bye	Abdelaal (EGY); W 01–00	Nagase (JPN); L 00–01	Did not advance				
Nicholas Mungai	−90 kg	Bye	Bobonov (UZB); L 00–01	Did not advance					

Women

Athlete	Event	Round of 32	Round of 16	Quarterfinals	Semifinals	Repechage	Final / BM	
Athlete	Event	Opposition Result	Opposition Result	Opposition Result	Opposition Result	Opposition Result	Opposition Result	Rank
Francesca Milani	−48 kg	Lin C-h (TPE); L 01–10	Did not advance					
Odette Giuffrida	−52 kg	Bye	Chițu (ROU); W 10–00	van Snick (BEL); W 01–00	Abe (JPN); L 00–01	—N/a	Pupp (HUN); W 10–00	3rd place, bronze medalist(s)
Maria Centracchio	−63 kg	Nomenjanahary (MAD); W 01–00	Özbas (HUN); W 01–00	Ozdoba-Błach (POL); W 01–00	Trstenjak (SLO); L 01–00	—N/a	Franssen (NED); W 01–00	3rd place, bronze medalist(s)
Alice Bellandi	−70 kg	Niang (MAR); W 01–00	Bernholm (SWE); W 01–00	van Dijke (NED); L 01–11	Did not advance	Matić (CRO); L 00–10	Did not advance	7

Mixed

Athlete	Event	Round of 16	Quarterfinals	Semifinals	Repechage	Final / BM	
Athlete	Event	Opposition Result	Opposition Result	Opposition Result	Opposition Result	Opposition Result	Rank
Fabio Basile; Nicholas Mungai; Christian Parlati; Alice Bellandi; Maria Centracchio; Odette Giuffrida	Team	Israel; L 3–4	Did not advance				

== Karate ==
Italy entered five karateka into the inaugural Olympic tournament. 2018 world champion Angelo Crescenzo (men's 67 kg), runner-up Luigi Busà (men's 75 kg), and bronze medalists Mattia Busato (men's kata) and Viviana Bottaro (women's kata) qualified directly for their respective kumite and kata categories by finishing among the top four karateka at the end of the combined WKF Olympic Rankings. Meanwhile, Silvia Semeraro finished second in the final pool round to secure a spot in the women's kumite +61-kg category at the World Olympic Qualification Tournament in Paris, France.

Kumite

Athlete	Event	Round robin					Semifinals	Final	
Athlete	Event	Opposition Result	Opposition Result	Opposition Result	Opposition Result	Rank	Opposition Result	Opposition Result	Rank
Angelo Crescenzo	Men's −67 kg	Madera (VEN); L 0–5	Withdrew				Did not advance		
Luigi Busà	Men's −75 kg	Yahiro (AUS); W 0–5	Azhikanov (KAZ); L 0–2	Bitsch (GER); W 2–2	Aghayev (AZE); W 3–1	1 Q	Horuna (UKR); W 3–0	Aghayev (AZE); W 1–0	1st place, gold medalist(s)
Silvia Semeraro	Women's +61 kg	Uekusa (JPN); W 4–3	Berultseva (KAZ); L 1–5	Zaretska (AZE); L 2–3	Hocaoğlu (TUR); W 9–4	3	Did not advance		

Kata

Athlete	Event	Elimination round		Ranking round		Final / BM	
Athlete	Event	Score	Rank	Score	Rank	Opposition Result	Rank
Mattia Busato	Men's kata	25.50	4	Did not advance			
Viviana Bottaro	Women's kata	25.57	2 Q	26.46	2 q	Kokumai (USA); W 26.48	3rd place, bronze medalist(s)

== Modern pentathlon ==
Italian athletes qualified for the following spots to compete in modern pentathlon. Elena Micheli secured her selection in the women's event with a runner-up finish at the 2019 UIPM World Championships in Budapest, Hungary.

Athlete	Event	Fencing (épée one touch)				Swimming (200 m freestyle)			Riding (show jumping)			Combined: shooting/running (10 m air pistol)/(3200 m)			Total points	Final rank
Athlete	Event	RR	BR	Rank	MP points	Time	Rank	MP points	Penalties	Rank	MP points	Time	Rank	MP Points	Total points	Final rank
Elena Micheli	Women's	17–18	6	15	208	2:09.22	6	292	EL	31	0	12:31.91	15	549	1049	33
Alice Sotero	Women's	21–14	1	30	227	2:07.88	5	295	15	20	285	12:24.38	13	556	1363	4

== Rowing ==
Italy qualified nine out of fourteen boats for each of the following rowing classes into the Olympic regatta, with the majority of crews confirming Olympic places for their boats at the 2019 FISA World Championships in Ottensheim, Austria.

Men

Athlete	Event	Heats		Repechage		Quarterfinals		Semifinals		Final	
Athlete	Event	Time	Rank	Time	Rank	Time	Rank	Time	Rank	Time	Rank
Gennaro Di Mauro	Single sculls	7:06.87	2 QF	Bye		7:26.25	3 SA/B	6:50.19	4 FB	6:47.38	8
Giovanni Abagnale; Marco Di Costanzo	Pair	6:48.74	2 SA/B	Bye		—N/a		6:20.29	5 FB	6:31.43	7
Stefano Oppo; Pietro Ruta	Lightweight double sculls	6:24.25	2 SA/B	Bye		—N/a		6:07.70	2 FA	6:14.30	3rd place, bronze medalist(s)
Matteo Castaldo; Matteo Lodo; Bruno Rosetti; Giuseppe Vicino	Four	5:57.67	2 FA	Bye		—N/a				5:43.60	3rd place, bronze medalist(s)
Giacomo Gentili; Andrea Panizza; Luca Rambaldi; Simone Venier	Quadruple sculls	5:39.28	2 FA	Bye		—N/a				5:37.29	5

Women

Athlete	Event	Heats		Repechage		Semifinals		Final	
Athlete	Event	Time	Rank	Time	Rank	Time	Rank	Time	Rank
Aisha Rocek; Kiri Tontodonati	Pair	7:22.79	3 SA/B	Bye		7:04.52	6 FB	7:04.46	12
Chiara Ondoli; Alessandra Patelli	Double sculls	6:59.58	3 SA/B	Bye		7:19.25	4 FB	6:58.88	9
Federica Cesarini; Valentina Rodini	Lightweight double sculls	7:04.66	2 SA/B	Bye		6:41.36 WR	1 FA	6:47.54	1st place, gold medalist(s)
Stefania Gobbi; Valentina Iseppi; Veronica Lisi; Alessandra Montesano	Quadruple sculls	6:20.45	3 R	6:37.44	1 FA	—N/a		6:13.33	4

Qualification Legend: FA=Final A (medal); FB=Final B (non-medal); FC=Final C (non-medal); FD=Final D (non-medal); FE=Final E (non-medal); FF=Final F (non-medal); SA/B=Semifinals A/B; SC/D=Semifinals C/D; SE/F=Semifinals E/F; QF=Quarterfinals; R=Repechage

== Sailing ==
Italian sailors qualified one boat in each of the following classes through the 2018 Sailing World Championships, the individual fleet Worlds, and European qualifying regattas.

On 19 February 2021, the Italian Sailing Federation (FIV) nominated three crews to compete in the rescheduled Tokyo 2020, including Rio 2016 Olympians Silvia Zennaro (women's Laser Radial) and 2018 world champion Ruggero Tita, along with his rookie partner Caterina Banti, in the mixed Nacra 17 catamaran. The women's 470 crew (Berta and Caruso) and Rio 2016 windsurfer Mattia Camboni were officially named to the Italian team on 19 March 2021.

Men

Athlete	Event	Race													Net points	Final rank
Athlete	Event	1	2	3	4	5	6	7	8	9	10	11	12	M*	Net points	Final rank
Mattia Camboni	RS:X	4	2	4	8	2	2	8	~~13~~	4	8	3	9	EL	76	5
Giulio Calabrò; Giacomo Ferrari	470	9	9	12	9	9	4	~~14~~	3	10	2	—N/a		14	81	6

Women

Athlete	Event	Race													Net points	Final rank
Athlete	Event	1	2	3	4	5	6	7	8	9	10	11	12	M*	Net points	Final rank
Marta Maggetti	RS:X	6	3	3	~~13~~	6	7	5	6	3	5	6	8	8	66	4
Silvia Zennaro	Laser Radial	13	~~20~~	2	6	17	11	3	10	9	13	—N/a		22	106	7
Elena Berta; Bianca Caruso	470	5	10	9	12	8	~~16~~	14	16	16	12	—N/a		22	102	13

Mixed

Athlete	Event	Race													Net points	Final rank
Athlete	Event	1	2	3	4	5	6	7	8	9	10	11	12	M*	Net points	Final rank
Ruggero Tita; Caterina Banti	Nacra 17	1	3	1	2	5	1	~~8~~	3	2	2	1	2	12	35	1st place, gold medalist(s)

M = Medal race; EL = Eliminated – did not advance into the medal race

== Shooting ==
Italian shooters achieved quota places for the following events by virtue of their best finishes at the 2018 ISSF World Championships, the 2019 ISSF World Cup series, European Championships or Games, and European Qualifying Tournament, as long as they obtained a minimum qualifying score (MQS) by 31 May 2020.

On 2 March 2020, the Italian Shotgun Federation officially announced the names of skeet shooters to compete in Tokyo 2020, namely defending champions Gabriele Rossetti and Diana Bacosi, Beijing 2008 gold medalist Chiara Cainero, and rookie Tammaro Cassandro. The rifle and pistol shooters were added to the Italian roster on 11 June 2021, with Marco de Nicolo aiming to collect a single medal at his sixth straight Games.

Men

Athlete	Event	Qualification		Final	
Athlete	Event	Points	Rank	Points	Rank
Lorenzo Bacci	10 m air rifle	622.2	34	Did not advance	
Lorenzo Bacci	50 m rifle 3 positions	1159	30	Did not advance	
Tammaro Cassandro	Skeet	124	2 Q	16	6
Tommaso Chelli	25 m rapid fire pistol	577	14	Did not advance	
Mauro de Filippis	Trap	122	10	Did not advance	
Marco de Nicolo	50 m rifle 3 positions	1168	19	Did not advance	
Riccardo Mazzetti	25 m rapid fire pistol	572	16	Did not advance	
Paolo Monna	10 m air pistol	570	26	Did not advance	
Gabriele Rossetti	Skeet	121	10	Did not advance	
Marco Suppini	10 m air rifle	622.1	35	Did not advance	

Women

Athlete	Event	Qualification		Final	
Athlete	Event	Points	Rank	Points	Rank
Diana Bacosi	Skeet	123	2 Q	55	2nd place, silver medalist(s)
Chiara Cainero	Skeet	114	20	Did not advance	
Sofia Ceccarello	10 m air rifle	627.3	10	Did not advance	
Sofia Ceccarello	50 m rifle 3 positions	1163	21	Did not advance	
Jessica Rossi	Trap	119	8	Did not advance	
Silvana Stanco	Trap	121	3 Q	22	5

Mixed

Athlete	Event	Qualification 1		Qualification 2		Final / BM	
Athlete	Event	Points	Rank	Points	Rank	Opposition Result	Rank
Marco Suppini; Sofia Ceccarello	10 m air rifle team	622.1	24	Did not advance			
Mauro De Filippis; Jessica Rossi	Trap team	141	12	—N/a		Did not advance	

== Skateboarding ==
Italy entered two skateboarders to compete in the men's park at the Games. Ivan Federico and Alessandro Mazzara were automatically selected among the top 16 eligible skateboarders based on the World Skate Olympic Rankings of 30 June 2021.

Athlete	Event	Qualification		Final	
Athlete	Event	Opposition Result	Rank	Opposition Result	Rank
Ivan Federico	Men's park	46.90	18	Did not advance	
Alessandro Mazzara	Men's park	65.25	12	Did not advance	
Asia Lanzi	Women's street	6.13	14	Did not advance	

== Softball ==
Italy women's softball team qualified for the Olympics by winning the gold medal and securing a lone outright berth at the final match of the WBSC Women's Softball Qualifying Event for Europe and Africa in Utrecht, Netherlands.

Summary

Team	Event	Round robin						Final / BM	
Team	Event	Opposition Result	Opposition Result	Opposition Result	Opposition Result	Opposition Result	Rank	Opposition Result	Rank
Italy women's	Women's tournament	United States; L 0–2	Australia; L 0–1	Japan; L 0–5	Mexico; L 0–5	Canada; L 1–8	6	Did not advance	

Team roster

The roster was released on 4 July 2021.

Softball at the 2020 Summer Olympics – Italy roster
Players		Coaches
Pitchers: 5 Alexia Lacatena; 7 Ilaria Cacciamani; 18 Greta Cecchetti	Catchers: 15 Elisa Cecchetti; 19 Marta Gasparotto; 20 Erika Piancastelli; Infielders: 8 Andrea Filler; 12 Amanda Fama; 14 Giulia Longhi; 22 Andrea Howard; 26 Emily Carosone; 27 Giulia Koutsoyanopulos; Outfielders: 4 Fabrizia Marrone; 21 Laura Vigna; 23 Beatrice Ricchi	Manager: 0 Federico Pizzolini; Coaches: Julio La Rosa Zequeira; Giovanna Palermi

Group play

Pos	Team	Pld	W	L	RF	RA	RD	PCT	GB	Qualification
1	United States	5	5	0	9	2	+7	1.000	—	Gold medal match
2	Japan (H)	5	4	1	18	5	+13	.800	1	Gold medal match
3	Canada	5	3	2	19	4	+15	.600	2	Bronze medal match
4	Mexico	5	2	3	11	10	+1	.400	3	Bronze medal match
5	Australia	5	1	4	5	21	−16	.200	4	
6	Italy	5	0	5	1	21	−20	.000	5	

Source: Tokyo 2020 and WBSC
(H) Hosts

21 July 12:00 (JST) Fukushima Azuma Baseball Stadium 31 °C (88 °F)
Team	1	2	3	4	5	6	7	R	H	E
Italy	0	0	0	0	0	0	0	0	1	2
United States	0	0	0	1	1	0	X	2	5	0
WP: Cat Osterman (1–0) LP: Greta Cecchetti (0–1) Sv: Monica Abbott (1); Boxscore

22 July 15:00 (JST) Fukushima Azuma Baseball Stadium 31 °C (88 °F)
Team	1	2	3	4	5	6	7	R	H	E
Italy	0	0	0	0	0	0	0	0	4	0
Australia	0	1	0	0	0	0	X	1	4	0
WP: Kaia Parnaby (1–1) LP: Greta Cecchetti (0–2) Sv: Ellen Roberts (1); Boxscore

24 July 20:00 (JST) Yokohama Stadium 28 °C (82 °F)
Team	1	2	3	4	5	6	7	R	H	E
Japan	0	0	0	2	0	3	0	5	6	0
Italy	0	0	0	0	0	0	0	0	3	0
WP: Miu Goto (2–0) LP: Alexia Lacatena (0–1); Home runs: JPN: Yu Yamamoto (2), Yamato Fujita (3); ITA: None; Boxscore

25 July 20:00 (JST) Yokohama Stadium 29 °C (84 °F)
Team	1	2	3	4	5	6	7	R	H	E
Italy	0	0	0	0	0	0	0	0	1	0
Mexico	0	1	1	0	3	0	X	5	9	0
WP: Dallas Escobedo (1–2) LP: Greta Cecchetti (0–3); Home runs: ITA: None; MEX: Sydney Romero (1), Anissa Urtez (2), Brittany Cervantes (1); Boxscore

26 July 14:30 (JST) Yokohama Stadium 31 °C (88 °F)
Team	1	2	3	4	5	6	7	R	H	E
Canada (6)	0	1	1	0	3	3	X	8	7	1
Italy	0	0	1	0	0	0	X	1	4	1
WP: Lauren Bay-Regula (1–0) LP: Greta Cecchetti (0–4); Home runs: CAN: Jennifer Gilbert (1); ITA: None; Boxscore

== Sport climbing ==
Italy entered three sport climbers into the Olympic tournament. Ludovico Fossali qualified directly for the men's combined event, by advancing to the final and securing one of the seven provisional berths at the 2019 IFSC World Championships in Hachioji, Japan. On the women's side, 18-year-old Laura Rogora finished in the top six of those eligible for qualification at the IFSC World Olympic Qualifying Event in Toulouse, France, earning a quota place and joining with Fossali on the Italian roster. The third and final slot was awarded to Michael Piccolruaz, after accepting an unused berth, as the next highest-ranked sport climber vying for qualification on the men's side at the Worlds.

Athlete	Event	Qualification									Final								
Athlete	Event	Speed		Boulder		Lead			Total	Rank	Speed		Boulder		Lead			Total	Rank
Athlete	Event	Best	Place	Result	Place	Hold	Time	Place	Total	Rank	Best	Place	Result	Place	Hold	Time	Place	Total	Rank
Ludovico Fossali	Men's	6.71	13	0T0z 0 0	19.5	25	2:48	18	4563.00	19	Did not advance								
Michael Piccolruaz	Men's	6.33	8	1T1z 12 4	14	28+	2:33	12	1248.00	15	Did not advance								
Laura Rogora	Women's	10.50	19	1T4z 1 5	7	25	—	10	1330.00	15	Did not advance								

== Surfing ==
Italy sent one surfer.

Athlete	Event	Round 1		Round 2		Round 3	Quarterfinal	Semifinal	Final / BM	
Athlete	Event	Points	Rank	Points	Rank	Opposition Result	Opposition Result	Opposition Result	Opposition Result	Rank
Leonardo Fioravanti	Men's shortboard	9.43	3 q	12.53	1 Q	Mesinas (PER); L 8.86—10.77	Did not advance			

Qualification Legend: Q= Qualified directly for the third round; q = Qualified for the second round

== Swimming ==
Italian swimmers further achieved qualifying standards in the following events (up to a maximum of 2 swimmers in each event at the Olympic Qualifying Time (OQT), and potentially 1 at the Olympic Selection Time (OST)): To assure their selection to the Olympic team, swimmers must finish in the top two of the final (or in heat-declared winner races on time for long-distance freestyle) inside the federation's target standards at the 2019 Italian Open Championships (12 to 14 December), 2020 Italian Open Championships (17 to 19 December), 2021 Italian Absolute Championships (31 March to 3 April), and 2021 European Championships in Budapest, Hungary (17 to 23 May).

Men

Athlete	Event	Heat		Semifinal		Final	
Athlete	Event	Time	Rank	Time	Rank	Time	Rank
Domenico Acerenza	1500 m freestyle	14:53.84	9	—N/a		Did not advance	
Stefano Ballo	200 m freestyle	1:45.80	7 Q	1:45.84	10	Did not advance	
Federico Burdisso	100 m butterfly	51.82	17	Did not advance			
Federico Burdisso	200 m butterfly	1:55.14	7 Q	1:55.11	4 Q	1:54.45	3rd place, bronze medalist(s)
Giacomo Carini	200 m butterfly	1:55.33	10 Q	1:55.95	15	Did not advance	
Thomas Ceccon	100 m freestyle	47.71	1 Q	48.05	12	Did not advance	
Thomas Ceccon	100 m backstroke	52.49	2 Q	52.78	4 Q	52.30	4
Santo Condorelli	50 m freestyle	22.14	=19	Did not advance			
Santo Condorelli	100 m butterfly	52.32	31	Did not advance			
Gabriele Detti	400 m freestyle	3:44.67	3 Q	—N/a		3:44.88	6
Gabriele Detti	800 m freestyle	7:49.47	12	—N/a		Did not advance	
Marco De Tullio	400 m freestyle	3:45.85	10	—N/a		Did not advance	
Stefano Di Cola	200 m freestyle	1:46.67	16 Q	1:47.19	14	Did not advance	
Nicolò Martinenghi	100 m breaststroke	58.68	4 Q	58.28	3 Q	58.33	3rd place, bronze medalist(s)
Pier Andrea Matteazzi	400 m individual medley	4:16.31	19	—N/a		Did not advance	
Alessandro Miressi	100 m freestyle	47.83	4 Q	47.52	3 Q	47.86	6
Gregorio Paltrinieri	800 m freestyle	7:47.73	8 Q	—N/a		7:42.11	2nd place, silver medalist(s)
Gregorio Paltrinieri	1500 m freestyle	14:49.17	4 Q	—N/a		14:45.01	4
Gregorio Paltrinieri	10 km open water	—N/a				1:49:01.1	3rd place, bronze medalist(s)
Federico Poggio	100 m breaststroke	59.33	=9 Q	59.91	15	Did not advance	
Alberto Razzetti	200 m individual medley	1:57.46	8 Q	1:57.70	9	Did not advance	
Alberto Razzetti	400 m individual medley	4:09.91	=5 Q	—N/a		4:11.32	8
Matteo Restivo	200 m backstroke	1:58.36	20	Did not advance			
Simone Sabbioni	100 m backstroke	53.79	17	Did not advance			
Mario Sanzullo	10 km open water	—N/a				1:53:08.6	14
Lorenzo Zazzeri	50 m freestyle	21.86	9 Q	21.75	7 Q	21.78	7
Thomas Ceccon; Santo Condorelli^{[a]} Manuel Frigo; Alessandro Miressi; Lorenzo Zazzeri	4 × 100 m freestyle relay	3:10.29	1 Q	—N/a		3:10.11 NR	2nd place, silver medalist(s)
Stefano Ballo; Matteo Ciampi; Marco De Tullio^{[a]} Stefano Di Cola; Filippo Megli	4 × 200 m freestyle relay	7:05.05	3 Q	—N/a		7:03.24	5
Federico Burdisso; Thomas Ceccon; Nicolò Martinenghi; Alessandro Miressi	4 × 100 m medley relay	3:30.02	1 Q	—N/a		3:29.17	3rd place, bronze medalist(s)

Women

Athlete	Event	Heat		Semifinal		Final	
Athlete	Event	Time	Rank	Time	Rank	Time	Rank
Ilaria Bianchi	100 m butterfly	57.70	12 Q	58.07	15	Did not advance	
Rachele Bruni	10 km open water	—N/a				2:02:10.2	14
Martina Caramignoli	800 m freestyle	8:33.15	20	—N/a		Did not advance	
Martina Caramignoli	1500 m freestyle	16:02.43	13	—N/a		Did not advance	
Martina Carraro	100 m breaststroke	1:05.85	5 Q	1:06.50	7 Q	1:06.19	7
Martina Carraro	200 m breaststroke	2:26.17	21	Did not advance			
Ilaria Cusinato	200 m individual medley	2:11.41	13 Q	2:12.10	14	Did not advance	
Ilaria Cusinato	400 m individual medley	4:37.37	8 Q	—N/a		4:40.65	8
Elena di Liddo	100 m butterfly	57.41	9 Q	57.60	13	Did not advance	
Francesca Fangio	200 m breaststroke	2:23.89	13 Q	2:27.56	15	Did not advance	
Sara Franceschi	200 m individual medley	2:11.47	14 Q	2:11.71	13	Did not advance	
Sara Franceschi	400 m individual medley	4:39.93	9	—N/a		Did not advance	
Margherita Panziera	100 m backstroke	59.74	8 Q	59.75	11	Did not advance	
Margherita Panziera	200 m backstroke	2:10.26	12 Q	2:09.54	9	Did not advance	
Federica Pellegrini	100 m freestyle	DNS		Did not advance			
Federica Pellegrini	200 m freestyle	1:57.33	15 Q	1:56.44	7 Q	1:55.91	7
Benedetta Pilato	100 m breaststroke	DSQ		Did not advance			
Simona Quadarella	800 m freestyle	8:17.32	3 Q	—N/a		8:18.35	3rd place, bronze medalist(s)
Simona Quadarella	1500 m freestyle	15:47.34	4 Q	—N/a		15:53.97	5
Anna Chiara Mascolo; Federica Pellegrini; Stefania Pirozzi; Giulia Vetrano	4 × 200 m freestyle relay	DSQ		—N/a		Did not advance	
Martina Carraro; Arianna Castiglioni^{[a]} Elena Di Liddo; Margherita Panziera; Federica Pellegrini	4 × 100 m medley relay	3:55.79 NR	4 Q	—N/a		3:56.68	6

Mixed

Athlete	Event	Heat		Final	
Athlete	Event	Time	Rank	Time	Rank
Thomas Ceccon; Elena Di Liddo; Nicolò Martinenghi; Federica Pellegrini; Simone Sabbioni^{[a]}	4 × 100 m medley relay	3:42.65	5 Q	3:39.28	4

^{a} Swimmers who participated in the heats only.

== Table tennis ==
Italy entered one athlete into the table tennis competition at the Games, marking the country's return to the sport for the first time since London 2012. Debora Vivarelli was automatically selected among the top ten table tennis players vying for qualification in the women's singles based on the ITTF Olympic Rankings of 1 June 2021.

Athlete	Event	Preliminary	Round 1	Round 2	Round 3	Round of 16	Quarterfinals	Semifinals	Final / BM	
Athlete	Event	Opposition Result	Opposition Result	Opposition Result	Opposition Result	Opposition Result	Opposition Result	Opposition Result	Opposition Result	Rank
Debora Vivarelli	Women's singles	Bye	Lay (AUS); L 1–4	Did not advance						

== Taekwondo ==
Italy entered two athletes into the taekwondo competition at the Games for the first time since London 2012. Vito Dell'Aquila qualified directly for the men's flyweight category (58 kg) by finishing among the top five taekwondo practitioners at the end of the WT Olympic Rankings. Meanwhile, 2019 world champion Simone Alessio scored a semifinal victory in the men's welterweight category (80 kg) to book the remaining spot on the Italian taekwondo squad at the 2021 European Qualification Tournament in Sofia, Bulgaria.

Athlete	Event	Round of 16	Quarterfinals	Semifinals	Repechage	Final / BM	
Athlete	Event	Opposition Result	Opposition Result	Opposition Result	Opposition Result	Opposition Result	Rank
Vito Dell'Aquila	Men's −58 kg	Salim (HUN); W 26–13	Sawekwiharee (THA); W 37–17	Guzmán (ARG); W 29–10	Bye	Jendoubi (TUN); W 16–12	1st place, gold medalist(s)
Simone Alessio	Men's −80 kg	Soares (BRA); W 22–3	Eissa (EGY); L 5–6	Did not advance			

== Tennis ==
Italy entered five tennis players (four men and one woman) into the Olympic tournament. Matteo Berrettini (world no. 9), Jannik Sinner (world no. 23), Lorenzo Sonego (world no. 26) and Fabio Fognini (world no. 29), qualified directly for the men's singles as four of the top 56 eligible players in the ATP World Rankings, while Camila Giorgi (world no. 76) did so for the women's singles along with rookie Jasmine Paolini (world no. 87) based on their WTA World Rankings of 14 June 2021. On 3 July, rookie Lorenzo Musetti (world no. 61) replaces Sinner, who withdrew due to personal concerns. On 18 July, Matteo Berrettini withdrew due to a thigh injury.

Men

Athlete	Event	Round of 64	Round of 32	Round of 16	Quarterfinals	Semifinals	Final / BM	
Athlete	Event	Opposition Score	Opposition Score	Opposition Score	Opposition Score	Opposition Score	Opposition Score	Rank
Fabio Fognini	Singles	Sugita (JPN); W 6–4, 6–3	Gerasimov (BLR); W 6–4, 7–6^{(7–4)}	Medvedev (ROC); L 2–6, 6–3, 2–6	Did not advance			
Lorenzo Sonego	Singles	Daniel (JPN); W 4–6, 7–6^{(8–6)}, 7–6^{(7–3)}	Basilashvili (GEO); L 4–6, 6–3, 4–6	Did not advance				
Lorenzo Musetti	Singles	Millman (AUS); L 3–6, 4–6	Did not advance					
Lorenzo Musetti; Lorenzo Sonego	Doubles	—N/a	Andújar / Carballés (ESP); W 7–5, 6–4	Mektić / Pavić (CRO); L 5–7, 7–6^{(7–5)}, [7–10]	Did not advance			

Women

Athlete	Event	Round of 64	Round of 32	Round of 16	Quarterfinals	Semifinals	Final / BM	
Athlete	Event	Opposition Score	Opposition Score	Opposition Score	Opposition Score	Opposition Score	Opposition Score	Rank
Camila Giorgi	Singles	Brady (USA); W 6–3, 6–2	Vesnina (ROC); W 6–3, 6–1	Plíšková (CZE); W 6–4, 6–2	Svitolina (UKR); L 4–6, 4–6	Did not advance		
Jasmine Paolini	Singles	Kvitová (CZE); L 3–6, 4–6	Did not advance					
Sara Errani	Singles	Pavlyuchenkova (ROC); L 0–6, 1–6	Did not advance					
Sara Errani; Jasmine Paolini	Doubles	—N/a	Melichar / Riske (USA); W 6–3, 5–7, [10–2]	N Kichenok / L Kichenok (UKR); L 6–7^{(4–7)}, 2–6	Did not advance			

== Triathlon ==
Italy qualified five triathletes (three men and two women) for the following events at the Games by winning the silver medal and securing the first of three available berths at the 2021 ITU Mixed Relay Olympic Qualification Tournament in Lisbon, Portugal.

Individual

Athlete	Event	Time						Rank
Athlete	Event	Swim (1.5 km)	Trans 1	Bike (40 km)	Trans 2	Run (10 km)	Total	Rank
Gianluca Pozzatti	Men's	18:00	0:43	56:24	0:36	33:31	1:49:14	37
Delian Stateff	Men's	17:54	0:42	56:31	0:29	34:24	1:50:00	39
Alice Betto	Women's	19:14	0:42	1:03:11	0:33	34:42	1:58:22	7
Angelica Olmo	Women's	20:15	0:45	1:06:01	0:36	Did not finish		
Verena Steinhauser	Women's	19:42	0:44	1:04:52	0:33	35:56	2:01:47	20

Relay

Athlete	Event	Time						Rank
Athlete	Event	Swim (300 m)	Trans 1	Bike (7 km)	Trans 2	Run (2 km)	Total group	Rank
Gianluca Pozzatti	Mixed relay	4:04	0:37	9:25	0:29	5:50	20:25	—N/a
Delian Stateff	Mixed relay	4:02	0:37	9:19	0:28	5:59	21:25	—N/a
Alice Betto	Mixed relay	4:24	0:39	10:41	0:30	6:31	22:45	—N/a
Verena Steinhauser	Mixed relay	4:03	0:39	10:21	0:28	6:17	21:48	—N/a
Total	Mixed relay	—N/a					1:26:23	8

== Volleyball ==
=== Beach ===
Italy men's beach volleyball pair qualified for the Games by advancing to the final match and securing an outright berth at the 2019 FIVB World Olympic Qualifying Tournament in Haiyang, China. Another slot was awarded to the Italian female beach volleyball pair by virtue of its top 15 placement in the FIVB Olympic Rankings of 13 June 2021.

Athlete	Event	Preliminary round				Repechage	Round of 16	Quarterfinals	Semifinals	Final / BM	
Athlete	Event	Opposition Score	Opposition Score	Opposition Score	Rank	Opposition Score	Opposition Score	Opposition Score	Opposition Score	Opposition Score	Rank
Adrian Carambula; Enrico Rossi	Men's	Crabb / Gibb (USA); L (18–21, 19–21)	Ahmed / Cherif (QAT); L (22–24, 13–21)	Gerson / Heidrich (SUI); L (14–21, 26–24, 13–15)	4	Did not advance					
Daniele Lupo; Paolo Nicolai	Men's	Thole / Wickler (GER); W (19–21, 21–19, 15–13)	Ishijima / Shiratori (JPN); W (21–19, 21–16)	Kantor / Łosiak (POL); W (21–19, 17–21, 15–10)	1 Q	Bye	Bryl / Fijałek (POL); W (22–20, 21–18)	Ahmed / Cherif (QAT); L (17–21, 21–23)	Did not advance		
Marta Menegatti; Viktoria Orsi Toth	Women's	Kholomina / Makroguzova (ROC); L (18–21, 15–21)	Artacho / Clancy (AUS); L (20–22, 19–21)	Leila / Lidy (CUB); L (16–21, 16–21)	4	Did not advance					

=== Indoor ===
Summary

Team	Event	Group Stage						Quarterfinal	Semifinal	Final / BM	
Team	Event	Opposition Score	Opposition Score	Opposition Score	Opposition Score	Opposition Score	Rank	Opposition Score	Opposition Score	Opposition Score	Rank
Italy men's	Men's tournament	Canada; W 3–2	Poland; L 0–3	Japan; W 3–1	Iran; W 3–1	Venezuela; W 3–0	2 Q	Argentina; L 2–3	Did not advance		
Italy women's	Women's tournament	ROC; W 3–0	Turkey; W 3–1	Argentina; W 3–0	China; L 0–3	United States; L 2–3	2 Q	Serbia; L 0–3	Did not advance		

==== Men's tournament ====
Italy men's volleyball team qualified for the Olympics by securing an outright berth as the highest-ranked nation for pool C at the Intercontinental Olympic Qualification Tournament in Bari.

Team roster

The Italy roster was announced on 21 June 2021.

Head coach: (Italy) Gianlorenzo Blengini

- 2 Jiří Kovář OH
- 4 Luca Vettori OP
- 5 Osmany Juantorena OH
- 6 Simone Giannelli S
- 9 Ivan Zaytsev (c) OP
- 11 Matteo Piano MB
- 13 Massimo Colaci L
- 14 Gianluca Galassi MB
- 15 Riccardo Sbertoli S
- 17 Simone Anzani MB
- 18 Alessandro Michieletto OH
- 19 Daniele Lavia OH

Group play

Pos	Team	Pld	W	L	Pts	SW	SL	SR	SPW	SPL	SPR	Qualification
1	Poland	5	4	1	13	14	4	3.500	435	365	1.192	Quarterfinals
2	Italy	5	4	1	11	12	7	1.714	447	411	1.088	Quarterfinals
3	Japan (H)	5	3	2	8	10	9	1.111	437	433	1.009	Quarterfinals
4	Canada	5	2	3	7	9	9	1.000	396	387	1.023	Quarterfinals
5	Iran	5	2	3	6	9	11	0.818	453	460	0.985	
6	Venezuela	5	0	5	0	1	15	0.067	281	393	0.715	

Source: Tokyo 2020 and FIVB
Rules for classification: Tiebreakers
(H) Host

24 July 2021; 09:00 v	Italy	3–2	Canada	Ariake Arena, Tokyo; Referees: Evgeny Makshanov (RUS), Liu Jiang (CHN)
24 July 2021; 09:00 v	(26–28, 18–25, 25–21, 25–18, 15–11); Results Statistics			Ariake Arena, Tokyo; Referees: Evgeny Makshanov (RUS), Liu Jiang (CHN)

26 July 2021; 14:20 v	Poland	3–0	Italy	Ariake Arena, Tokyo; Referees: Paulo Turci (BRA), Denny Cespedes (DOM)
26 July 2021; 14:20 v	(25–20, 26–24, 25–20); Results Statistics			Ariake Arena, Tokyo; Referees: Paulo Turci (BRA), Denny Cespedes (DOM)

28 July 2021; 19:40 v	Japan	1–3	Italy	Ariake Arena, Tokyo; Referees: Juraj Mokrý (SVK), Fabrice Collados (FRA)
28 July 2021; 19:40 v	(20–25, 17–25, 25–23, 21–25); Results Statistics			Ariake Arena, Tokyo; Referees: Juraj Mokrý (SVK), Fabrice Collados (FRA)

30 July 2021; 19:40 v	Italy	3–1	Iran	Ariake Arena, Tokyo; Referees: Vladimir Simonović (SRB), Denny Cespedes (DOM)
30 July 2021; 19:40 v	(30–28, 25–21, 21–25, 25–21); Results Statistics			Ariake Arena, Tokyo; Referees: Vladimir Simonović (SRB), Denny Cespedes (DOM)

1 August 2021; 16:25 v	Italy	3–0	Venezuela	Ariake Arena, Tokyo; Referees: Hernán Casamiquela (ARG), Sumie Myoi (JPN)
1 August 2021; 16:25 v	(25–22, 25–15, 25–17); Results Statistics			Ariake Arena, Tokyo; Referees: Hernán Casamiquela (ARG), Sumie Myoi (JPN)

Quarterfinal

3 August 2021; 17:01 v	Italy	2–3	Argentina	Ariake Arena, Tokyo; Referees: Vladimir Simonović (SRB), Wojciech Maroszek (POL)
3 August 2021; 17:01 v	(25–21, 23–25, 22–25, 25–14, 12–15); Results Statistics			Ariake Arena, Tokyo; Referees: Vladimir Simonović (SRB), Wojciech Maroszek (POL)

==== Women's tournament ====
Italy women's volleyball team qualified for the Olympics by securing an outright berth as the highest-ranked nation for pool F at the Intercontinental Olympic Qualification Tournament in Catania.

Team roster

The Italy roster was announced on 5 July 2021.

Head coach: Davide Mazzanti

- 1 Indre Sorokaite OS
- 5 Ofelia Malinov S
- 6 Monica De Gennaro L
- 7 Raphaela Folie MB
- 8 Alessia Orro S
- 9 Caterina Bosetti OS
- 10 Cristina Chirichella MB
- 11 Anna Danesi MB
- 13 Sarah Fahr MB
- 14 Elena Pietrini OS
- 17 Myriam Sylla (c) OS
- 18 Paola Egonu OP

Group play

Pos	Team	Pld	W	L	Pts	SW	SL	SR	SPW	SPL	SPR	Qualification
1	United States	5	4	1	10	12	7	1.714	418	401	1.042	Quarter-finals
2	Italy	5	3	2	10	11	7	1.571	409	377	1.085	Quarter-finals
3	Turkey	5	3	2	9	12	8	1.500	434	416	1.043	Quarter-finals
4	ROC	5	3	2	9	11	8	1.375	422	378	1.116	Quarter-finals
5	China	5	2	3	7	8	9	0.889	374	385	0.971	
6	Argentina	5	0	5	0	0	15	0.000	275	375	0.733	

Source: Tokyo 2020 and FIVB
Rules for classification: Tiebreakers

25 July 2021; 09:00	ROC	0–3	Italy	Ariake Arena, Tokyo; Referees: Patricia Rolf (USA), Wojciech Maroszek (POL)
25 July 2021; 09:00	(23–25, 19–25, 14–25); Results Statistics			Ariake Arena, Tokyo; Referees: Patricia Rolf (USA), Wojciech Maroszek (POL)

27 July 2021; 16:25	Italy	3–1	Turkey	Ariake Arena, Tokyo; Referees: Denny Cespedes (DOM), Hernán Casamiquela (ARG)
27 July 2021; 16:25	(25–22, 23–25, 25–20, 25–15); Results Statistics			Ariake Arena, Tokyo; Referees: Denny Cespedes (DOM), Hernán Casamiquela (ARG)

29 July 2021; 09:00	Italy	3–0	Argentina	Ariake Arena, Tokyo; Referees: Susana Rodríguez (ESP), Liu Jiang (CHN)
29 July 2021; 09:00	(25–21, 25–16, 25–15); Results Statistics			Ariake Arena, Tokyo; Referees: Susana Rodríguez (ESP), Liu Jiang (CHN)

31 July 2021; 21:45	China	3–0	Italy	Ariake Arena, Tokyo; Referees: Shin Muranaka (JPN), Evgeny Makshanov (RUS)
31 July 2021; 21:45	(25–21, 25–20, 26–24); Results Statistics			Ariake Arena, Tokyo; Referees: Shin Muranaka (JPN), Evgeny Makshanov (RUS)

2 August 2021; 11:05	United States	3–2	Italy	Ariake Arena, Tokyo; Referees: Liu Jiang (CHN), Luis Macias (MEX)
2 August 2021; 11:05	(21–25, 25–16, 25–27, 25–16, 15–12); Results Statistics			Ariake Arena, Tokyo; Referees: Liu Jiang (CHN), Luis Macias (MEX)

Quarterfinal

4 August 2021; 17:00	Serbia	3–0	Italy	Ariake Arena, Tokyo; Referees: Paulo Turci (BRA), Evgeny Makshanov (RUS)
4 August 2021; 17:00	(25–21, 25–14, 25–21); Results Statistics			Ariake Arena, Tokyo; Referees: Paulo Turci (BRA), Evgeny Makshanov (RUS)

== Water polo ==
Summary

Key:
- FT – After full time.
- P – Match decided by penalty-shootout.

Team	Event	Group stage						Quarterfinal	Semifinal	Final / BM	
Team	Event	Opposition Score	Opposition Score	Opposition Score	Opposition Score	Opposition Score	Rank	Opposition Score	Opposition Score	Opposition Score	Rank
Italy men's	Men's tournament	South Africa; W 21–2	Greece; D 6–6	United States; W 11–12	Japan; W 16–8	Hungary; D 5–5	2	Serbia; L 6–10	Classification semifinal United States; L 6–7	Seventh place final Montenegro; W 18–17	7

=== Men's tournament ===
Italy men's national water polo team qualified for the Olympics by advancing to the final match and securing an outright berth at the 2019 FINA World Championships in Gwangju, South Korea.

Team roster

Italy's final squad was announced on 2 July 2021.

Head coach: Sandro Campagna

No.	Player	Pos.	L/R	Height	Weight	Date of birth (age)	Apps	OG/ Goals	Club	Ref
1	Marco Del Lungo	GK	R	1.90 m (6 ft 3 in)	97 kg (214 lb)	1 March 1990 (aged 31)	190	1/0	(Italy) Brescia	
2	Francesco Di Fulvio	D	R	1.90 m (6 ft 3 in)	88 kg (194 lb)	15 August 1993 (aged 27)	192	1/8	(Italy) Pro Recco	
3	Stefano Luongo	D	R	1.84 m (6 ft 0 in)	84 kg (185 lb)	5 January 1990 (aged 31)	167	0/0	(Italy) Pro Recco	
4	Pietro Figlioli (C)	D	R	1.91 m (6 ft 3 in)	98 kg (216 lb)	29 May 1984 (aged 37)	263	4/42	(Italy) Pro Recco	
5	Nicholas Presciutti	CB	R	1.89 m (6 ft 2 in)	90 kg (198 lb)	14 December 1993 (aged 27)	109	0/0	(Italy) Pro Recco	
6	Alessandro Velotto	D	R	1.86 m (6 ft 1 in)	85 kg (187 lb)	12 February 1995 (aged 26)	153	1/1	(Italy) Pro Recco	
7	Vincenzo Renzuto	D	R	1.91 m (6 ft 3 in)	80 kg (176 lb)	8 April 1993 (aged 28)	95	0/0	(Italy) Brescia	
8	Gonzalo Echenique	D	L	1.95 m (6 ft 5 in)	96 kg (212 lb)	27 April 1990 (aged 31)	59	1/11	(Italy) Pro Recco	
9	Niccolò Figari	CB	R	1.98 m (6 ft 6 in)	91 kg (201 lb)	24 January 1988 (aged 33)	170	0/0	(Italy) Pro Recco	
10	Michaël Bodegas	CF	R	1.92 m (6 ft 4 in)	102 kg (225 lb)	3 May 1987 (aged 34)	122	1/3	(Spain) Barceloneta	
11	Matteo Aicardi	CF	R	1.92 m (6 ft 4 in)	102 kg (225 lb)	19 April 1986 (aged 35)	265	2/9	(Italy) Pro Recco	
12	Vincenzo Dolce	D	R	1.95 m (6 ft 5 in)	92 kg (203 lb)	11 May 1995 (aged 26)	56	0/0	(Italy) Brescia	
13	Gianmarco Nicosia	GK	R	1.96 m (6 ft 5 in)	93 kg (205 lb)	12 February 1998 (aged 23)	58	0/0	(Italy) Telimar Palermo	
Average				1.91 m (6 ft 3 in)	92 kg (203 lb)	30 years, 118 days	146			

Note: Age as of 23 July 2021
Source: Italy Men | Tokyo 2020 Olympics Archived 2021-07-22 at the Wayback Machine

Group play

Pos	Team	Pld	W	D	L	GF	GA	GD	Pts	Qualification
1	Greece	5	4	1	0	68	34	+34	9	Quarterfinals
2	Italy	5	3	2	0	60	32	+28	8	Quarterfinals
3	Hungary	5	3	1	1	64	35	+29	7	Quarterfinals
4	United States	5	2	0	3	59	53	+6	4	Quarterfinals
5	Japan (H)	5	1	0	4	65	66	−1	2	
6	South Africa	5	0	0	5	20	116	−96	0	

Source: Tokyo 2020 and FINA
Rules for classification: 1) Points; 2) Head-to-head points; 3) Head-to-head goal difference; 4) Head-to-head goals scored; 5) Goal difference.
(H) Hosts

25 July 2021; 10:00 v	Report	South Africa	2–21	Italy	Tokyo Tatsumi International Swimming Center; Referees: Viktor Salnichenko (KAZ), Stanko Ivanovski (MNE)
25 July 2021; 10:00 v	Report	Score by quarters: 0–2, 2–8, 0–7, 0–4			Tokyo Tatsumi International Swimming Center; Referees: Viktor Salnichenko (KAZ), Stanko Ivanovski (MNE)
25 July 2021; 10:00 v	Report	Rezelman, Stone 1	Goals	Di Fulvio 5	Tokyo Tatsumi International Swimming Center; Referees: Viktor Salnichenko (KAZ), Stanko Ivanovski (MNE)

27 July 2021; 15:30 v	Report	Italy	6–6	Greece	Tokyo Tatsumi International Swimming Center; Referees: Xevi Buch (ESP), Stanko Ivanovski (MNE)
27 July 2021; 15:30 v	Report	Score by quarters: 1–1, 1–1, 0–4, 4–0			Tokyo Tatsumi International Swimming Center; Referees: Xevi Buch (ESP), Stanko Ivanovski (MNE)
27 July 2021; 15:30 v	Report	Aicardi, Figlioli 2	Goals	six players 1	Tokyo Tatsumi International Swimming Center; Referees: Xevi Buch (ESP), Stanko Ivanovski (MNE)

29 July 2021; 14:00 v	Report	United States	11–12	Italy	Tokyo Tatsumi International Swimming Center; Referees: Sébastien Dervieux (FRA), Nenad Periš (CRO)
29 July 2021; 14:00 v	Report	Score by quarters: 4–2, 3–3, 2–3, 2–4			Tokyo Tatsumi International Swimming Center; Referees: Sébastien Dervieux (FRA), Nenad Periš (CRO)
29 July 2021; 14:00 v	Report	four players 2	Goals	Di Fulvio 5	Tokyo Tatsumi International Swimming Center; Referees: Sébastien Dervieux (FRA), Nenad Periš (CRO)

31 July 2021; 18:20 v	Report	Italy	16–8	Japan	Tokyo Tatsumi International Swimming Center; Referees: Stanko Ivanovski (MNE), Nenad Periš (CRO)
31 July 2021; 18:20 v	Report	Score by quarters: 5–0, 3–3, 3–1, 5–4			Tokyo Tatsumi International Swimming Center; Referees: Stanko Ivanovski (MNE), Nenad Periš (CRO)
31 July 2021; 18:20 v	Report	Bodagas, Figlioli 3	Goals	Inaba 3	Tokyo Tatsumi International Swimming Center; Referees: Stanko Ivanovski (MNE), Nenad Periš (CRO)

2 August 2021; 10:00 v	Report	Hungary	5–5	Italy	Tokyo Tatsumi International Swimming Center; Referees: Xevi Buch (ESP), Arkadiy Voevodin (RUS)
2 August 2021; 10:00 v	Report	Score by quarters: 2–1, 2–1, 1–1, 0–2			Tokyo Tatsumi International Swimming Center; Referees: Xevi Buch (ESP), Arkadiy Voevodin (RUS)
2 August 2021; 10:00 v	Report	Varga 3	Goals	Figlioli 2	Tokyo Tatsumi International Swimming Center; Referees: Xevi Buch (ESP), Arkadiy Voevodin (RUS)

Quarterfinal

4 August 2021; 18:20 v	Report	Italy	6–10	Serbia	Tokyo Tatsumi International Swimming Center; Referees: Arkadiy Voevodin (RUS), Georgios Stavridis (GRE)
4 August 2021; 18:20 v	Report	Score by quarters: 2–5, 1–4, 1–0, 2–1			Tokyo Tatsumi International Swimming Center; Referees: Arkadiy Voevodin (RUS), Georgios Stavridis (GRE)
4 August 2021; 18:20 v	Report	Presciutti 2	Goals	Filipović 3	Tokyo Tatsumi International Swimming Center; Referees: Arkadiy Voevodin (RUS), Georgios Stavridis (GRE)

5–8th place semifinal

6 August 2021; 18:20 v	Report	Italy	6–7	United States	Tokyo Tatsumi International Swimming Center; Referees: Sébastien Dervieux (FRA), Xevi Buch (ESP)
6 August 2021; 18:20 v	Report	Score by quarters: 2–2, 1–3, 2–0, 1–2			Tokyo Tatsumi International Swimming Center; Referees: Sébastien Dervieux (FRA), Xevi Buch (ESP)
6 August 2021; 18:20 v	Report	Figlioli, Renzuto 2	Goals	Bowen 3	Tokyo Tatsumi International Swimming Center; Referees: Sébastien Dervieux (FRA), Xevi Buch (ESP)

Seventh place game

8 August 2021; 09:30 v	Report	Montenegro	14–14; PSO: 3–4	Italy	Tokyo Tatsumi International Swimming Center; Referees: Viktor Salnichenko (KAZ), Sébastien Dervieux (FRA)
8 August 2021; 09:30 v	Report	Score by quarters: 2–3, 5–4, 4–5, 3–2			Tokyo Tatsumi International Swimming Center; Referees: Viktor Salnichenko (KAZ), Sébastien Dervieux (FRA)
8 August 2021; 09:30 v	Report	Ivović 6	Goals	Velotto 5	Tokyo Tatsumi International Swimming Center; Referees: Viktor Salnichenko (KAZ), Sébastien Dervieux (FRA)

== Weightlifting ==
Italy entered four weightlifters into the Olympic competition. Mirko Zanni (men's 67 kg), Antonino Pizzolato (men's 81 kg), and Rio 2016 Olympian Giorgia Bordignon (women's 64 kg) secured one of the top eight slots each in their respective weight divisions based on the IWF Absolute World Rankings, with Davide Ruiu topping the field of weightlifters from the European zone in the men's 61 kg category based on the IWF Absolute Continental Rankings.

Athlete	Event	Snatch		Clean & Jerk		Total	Rank
Athlete	Event	Result	Rank	Result	Rank	Total	Rank
Davide Ruiu	Men's −61 kg	127	7	159	6	286	6
Mirko Zanni	Men's −67 kg	145	5	177	3	322	3rd place, bronze medalist(s)
Antonino Pizzolato	Men's −81 kg	165	2	200	3	365	3rd place, bronze medalist(s)
Maria Grazia Alemanno	Women's −59 kg	85	11	100	11	185	11
Giorgia Bordignon	Women's −64 kg	104	3	128	2	232	2nd place, silver medalist(s)

== Wrestling ==
Italy qualified two wrestlers for each of the following classes into the Olympic competition. One of them finished among the top six to claim an Olympic slot in the men's freestyle 74 kg at the 2019 World Championships, while an additional license was awarded to the Italian wrestler, who progressed to the top two finals of the men's freestyle 97 kg at the 2021 World Qualification Tournament in Sofia, Bulgaria.

Key:

- VT (ranking points: 5–0 or 0–5) – Victory by fall.
- VB (ranking points: 5–0 or 0–5) – Victory by injury (VF for forfeit, VA for withdrawal or disqualification)
- PP (ranking points: 3–1 or 1–3) – Decision by points – the loser with technical points.
- PO (ranking points: 3–0 or 0–3) – Decision by points – the loser without technical points.
- ST (ranking points: 4–0 or 0–4) – Great superiority – the loser without technical points and a margin of victory of at least 8 (Greco-Roman) or 10 (freestyle) points.
- SP (ranking points: 4–1 or 1–4) – Technical superiority – the loser with technical points and a margin of victory of at least 8 (Greco-Roman) or 10 (freestyle) points.

Freestyle

Athlete	Event	Round of 16	Quarterfinal	Semifinal	Repechage	Final / BM	
Athlete	Event	Opposition Result	Opposition Result	Opposition Result	Opposition Result	Opposition Result	Rank
Frank Chamizo	Men's −74 kg	Kentchadze (GEO); W 3–1 ^{PP}	Bayramov (AZE); W 3–1 ^{PP}	Kadimagomedov (BLR); L 1–3 ^{PP}	Bye	Dake (USA); L 0–3 ^{PO}	5
Abraham Conyedo	Men's −97 kg	Saritov (ROU); W 3–1 ^{PP}	Snyder (USA); L 0–3 ^{PO}	Did not advance	Steen (CAN); W 3–1 ^{PP}	Karadeniz (TUR); W 3–1 ^{PP}	3rd place, bronze medalist(s)

== See also ==
- Italy at the 2020 Summer Paralympics
