= Rowing at the 2020 Summer Olympics – Women's quadruple sculls =

Women's quadruple sculls at the Games of the XXXII Olympiad
- Olympic rowing
- Venue: Sea Forest Waterway
- Dates: 23–28 July 2021
- Competitors: 40 from 10 nations
- Winning time: 6:05.13

Medalists
1st place, gold medalist(s)		Chen Yunxia; Zhang Ling; Lü Yang; Cui Xiaotong	China
2nd place, silver medalist(s)		Agnieszka Kobus; Marta Wieliczko; Maria Sajdak; Katarzyna Zillmann	Poland
3rd place, bronze medalist(s)		Ria Thompson; Rowena Meredith; Harriet Hudson; Caitlin Cronin	Australia

The women's quadruple sculls event at the 2020 Summer Olympics took place from 23 to 28 July 2021 at the Sea Forest Waterway. 40 rowers from 10 nations competed.

== Background ==
This was the 12th appearance of the event, which has been held every year since women's rowing was introduced in 1976. The reigning medalists in the event were Germany, Netherlands, and Poland. All three qualified boats for the event.

== Qualification ==
Each National Olympic Committee (NOC) has been limited to a single boat in the event since 1912. There were 10 qualifying places in the women's quadruple sculls:

- 8 from the 2019 World Championship
- 2 from the final qualification regatta

== Competition format ==
This rowing event was a quadruple scull event, meaning that each boat is propelled by four rowers. The "scull" portion means that the rower uses two oars, one on each side of the boat; this contrasts with sweep rowing in which each rower has one oar and rows on only one side. The competition consists of two rounds. Finals are held to determine the placing of each boat. The course used the 2000 metres distance that became the Olympic standard in 1912.

During the first round two heats were held. The first two boats in each heat advanced to final A, while all others were relegated to the repechages.

The repechage offered rowers a second chance to qualify for Final A. The top two boats in the repechage moved on to the semifinals, with the remaining boats sent to Final B.

There are two finals. Final A determined the medalists and the places through 6th. Final B determined places seven through ten.

== Schedule ==
The competition was held over five days.

All times are Japan Standard Time (UTC+9)

Date	Time	Round
Friday, 23 July 2021	11:50	Heats
Sunday, 25 July 2021	10:50	Repechage
Wednesday, 28 July 2021	9:00	Final B
Wednesday, 28 July 2021	10:50	Final A

== Results ==
=== Heats ===
The first two of each heat qualified for the final, while the remainder went to the repechage.

==== Heat 1 ====
Rank	Lane	Rower	Nation	Time	Notes
1	2	Daniela Schultze; Franziska Kampmann; Carlotta Nwajide; Frieda Hämmerling	Germany	6:18.22	Q
2	4	Laila Youssifou; Inge Janssen; Olivia van Rooijen; Nicole Beukers	Netherlands	6:19.36	Q
3	1	Hannah Scott; Mathilda Hodgkins-Byrne; Charlotte Hodgkins-Byrne; Lucy Glover	Great Britain	6:20.80	R
4	3	Georgia Nugent-O'Leary; Ruby Tew; Eve Macfarlane; Olivia Loe	New Zealand	6:25.23	R
5	5	Cicely Madden; Alison Rusher; Meghan O'Leary; Ellen Tomek	United States	6:34.36	R

==== Heat 2 ====
Rank	Lane	Rower	Nation	Time	Notes
1	2	Yunxia Chen; Ling Zhang; Yang Lü; Xiaotong Cui	China	6:14.32	Q
2	1	Agnieszka Kobus; Marta Wieliczko; Maria Sajdak; Katarzyna Zillmann	Poland	6:18.62	Q
3	4	Valentina Iseppi; Alessandra Montesano; Veronica Lisi; Stefania Gobbi	Italy	6:20.45	R
4	5	Ria Thompson; Rowena Meredith; Harriet Hudson; Caitlin Cronin	Australia	6:26.21	R
5	3	Violaine Aernoudts; Margaux Bailleul; Marie Jacquet; Emma Lunatti	France	6:33.64	R

=== Repechage ===
The first two qualified for the final, while the remainder went to the B final and were out of medal contention.

Rank	Lane	Rower	Nation	Time	Notes
1	2	Ria Thompson; Rowena Meredith; Harriet Hudson; Caitlin Cronin	Australia	6:36.67	FA
2	3	Valentina Iseppi; Alessandra Montesano; Veronica Lisi; Stefania Gobbi	Italy	6:37.44	FA
3	5	Georgia Nugent-O'Leary; Ruby Tew; Eve Macfarlane; Olivia Loe	New Zealand	6:39.91	FB
4	4	Hannah Scott; Mathilda Hodgkins-Byrne; Charlotte Hodgkins-Byrne; Lucy Glover	Great Britain	6:42.97	FB
5	6	Violaine Aernoudts; Margaux Bailleul; Marie Jacquet; Emma Lunatti	France	6:47.41	FB
6	1	Cicely Madden; Alison Rusher; Meghan O'Leary; Ellen Tomek	United States	6:50.74	FB

=== Finals ===
==== Final B ====
Rank	Lane	Rower	Nation	Time	Notes
7	2	Hannah Scott; Mathilda Hodgkins-Byrne; Charlotte Hodgkins-Byrne; Lucy Glover	Great Britain	6:25.14	
8	3	Georgia Nugent-O'Leary; Ruby Tew; Eve Macfarlane; Olivia Loe	New Zealand	6:29.00	
9	4	Violaine Aernoudts; Margaux Bailleul; Marie Jacquet; Emma Lunatti	France	6:29.70	
10	1	Cicely Madden; Alison Rusher; Meghan O'Leary; Ellen Tomek	United States	6:30.03	

==== Final A ====
Rank	Lane	Rower	Nation	Time	Notes
1st place, gold medalist(s)	3	Chen Yunxia; Zhang Ling; Lü Yang; Cui Xiaotong	China	6:05.13	OB, WB
2nd place, silver medalist(s)	5	Agnieszka Kobus; Marta Wieliczko; Maria Sajdak; Katarzyna Zillmann	Poland	6:11.36	
3rd place, bronze medalist(s)	6	Ria Thompson; Rowena Meredith; Harriet Hudson; Caitlin Cronin	Australia	6:12.08	
4	1	Valentina Iseppi; Alessandra Montesano; Veronica Lisi; Stefania Gobbi	Italy	6:13.33	
5	4	Daniela Schultze; Franziska Kampmann; Carlotta Nwajide; Frieda Hämmerling	Germany	6:13.41	
6	2	Laila Youssifou; Inge Janssen; Olivia van Rooijen; Nicole Beukers	Netherlands	6:15.75	
