= Chris Moller =

Chris Moller may refer to:

- Chris Moller (architect), New Zealand architect
- Chris Moller (businessman), New Zealand businessman and sports administrator
