= Georgia Nugent-O'Leary =

New Zealand rower (born 1996)

Personal information
- Nationality: New Zealand
- Born: 14 August 1996 (age 30) Whanganui, New Zealand

Sport
- Country: New Zealand
- Sport: Rowing
- Event: Quad sculls

Georgia Nugent-O'Leary (born 14 August 1996) is a New Zealand rower. She competed at the 2020 Tokyo Olympics in the quad sculls.

== Early life ==
Nugent-O'Leary was born in 1996 in Whanganui. She is from Marton in the Rangitikei District. She received her schooling at Nga Tawa Diocesan School, where she started rowing in early 2012. She is studying for a Bachelor of Science with a major in food science.

== Rowing career ==
Nugent-O'Leary is a member of the Aramoho Whanganui Rowing Club, which is based in the outlying suburb Whanganui of Aramoho and which is affiliated to Nga Tawa Diocesan School. In March 2013, she joined Jackie Gowler (who was at Nga Tawa Diocesan School in the same year) in the U18 double scull at the Maadi Cup held at Lake Karapiro that year. Based on that result, she was sent to August 2014 World Rowing Junior Championships in Hamburg, Germany, where the New Zealand quad scull came sixth. She relocated to Blenheim to become a member of the Central Rowing Performance Centre.

During 2015, Nugent-O'Leary rowed with Davina Waddy from Christchurch in the coxless pair. In 2016, she made the team for the U23 women's eight. At the 2016 World Rowing U23 Championships in Rotterdam, Netherlands, the team came fourth, beaten by the Russian team for the bronze medal by just 0.31 seconds. She was invited to join the 2016/17 summer squad but in the second week of training, she crashed on her bike, broke an arm and received a concussion that sustained itself for a long time. This crash forced an 18-month retirement from rowing.

Returning to rowing in 2018 at the Aramoho Whanganui Rowing Club, she competed in the February 2018 National Championships where she won silver in the senior single scull, beaten for the title by Veronica Wall. In 2019, she once again trained at the Central Rowing Performance Centre. At the February 2019 National Championships, she competed in three senior boat classes. She came fourth in the double scull (with Ruby Willis), won silver with the quad scull (with Willis, Nicola Baker and Kirstyn Goodger), and took out the national title with the eight. During 2019, she moved to Cambridge where most of New Zealand's elite rowers are based.

At the February 2020 National Championships, she competed in the single scull and double scull (with Sophie MacKenzie) and came fifth in both boat classes. This was her last competition before the country went into lockdown due to the COVID-19 pandemic and the Olympic Games got delayed by 12 months.

At the beginning of February 2021, Nugent-O'Leary was announced as part of the Rowing NZ elite team as part of the quad scull. Later that same month at the 2021 National Championships, she competed in four boat classes. In the cox scull, she came fifth. With the eight, she won bronze and with the double scull (with Ruby Tew), she won silver. With the coxless four (alongside Jackie Gowler, Kerri Gowler, and Phoebe Collier), she gained her second national title. When the Olympic rowing team for the Tokyo Olympics got nominated in June 2021, Nugent-O'Leary was confirmed for the quad scull team.
