= Anne Gambrill =

New Zealand lawyer and judge (1934–2026)

Anne Gambrill CNZM
- Born: Anne Gertrude Shorland; 16 September 1934; Wellington, New Zealand
- Died: 10 February 2026 (aged 91); Auckland, New Zealand
- Education: Nga Tawa Diocesan School; Samuel Marsden Collegiate School; University of Auckland Law School
- Occupations: Lawyer; judge
- Spouse: Christopher Gambrill (m. 1960; died 2023)
- Children: 3

Anne Gertrude Gambrill CNZM (née Shorland; 16 September 1934 – 10 February 2026) was a New Zealand lawyer and judge. She was the first woman to sit on the High Court bench in New Zealand, and the seventh woman admitted to the judiciary. She was also the first female law clerk at Russell McVeagh and the first woman appointed to the Legal Aid Appeal Authority.

== Early life and family ==
Born Anne Gertrude Shorland in Wellington on 16 September 1934, Gambrill was the only child of William Perry Shorland and his wife Olive. She was educated at Samuel Marsden Collegiate School in Wellington for her first few years of secondary schooling, and finished her high school studies at Nga Tawa Diocesan School in 1952. Gambrill studied law for two years at Victoria University of Wellington and then moved to the University of Auckland when her father was appointed to the High Court in 1955. While a student, she became the first female law clerk at Russell McVeagh.

In 1960, she married Christopher Gambrill, a lawyer, at St Matthew-in-the-City, Auckland, and they had three children.

== Career ==
Gambrill was admitted as a solicitor in 1958 (by her father) and as a barrister in 1960. She was a solicitor at MH Vautier QC from 1965 to 1970, and subsequently joined Mackay & Gambrill, becoming a partner in 1971. Early in her career, Gambrill advocated for the participation and advancement of women in the legal profession. As part of the Auckland District Law Society, she organised the first section for women lawyers in 1976, which subsequently became part of the Auckland Women Lawyers' Association. In 1977, she became the first female member of the Legal Aid Appeal Authority. Gambrill was the seventh woman admitted to the judiciary in New Zealand, and the first woman to sit on the High Court bench. After declining possible appointments to the District Court and Family Court, she was appointed a master (now called associate judge) of the High Court in 1987, a position she held for 15 years. Following the stock market crash on Black Monday in 1987, the court with Gambrill saw an increased volume of cases from companies that went out of business and became insolvent. Other areas of legal focus included insurance law, contracts, property, and other business cases. Gambrill was appointed to the Insolvency Court in 1999. She retired from the judiciary in 2002.

Gambrill held a number of community roles. She was a founding member and the second president of the Auckland Zonta International Club, after Cherry Raymond. Gambrill was an active member of the club for over 50 years. In the 1980s and 1990s, she was the chair of the Auckland branch of the Samuel Marsden Collegiate Old Girls' Association, and of the Auckland Decorative and Fine Arts Society, as well as served on the International Education Appeal Authority dealing with complaints from international students in New Zealand.

== Honours and awards ==
Gambrill was a recipient of the New Zealand 1990 Commemoration Medal. In the 2002 New Year Honours, she was appointed a Companion of the New Zealand Order of Merit, for services as a master of the High Court.

== Death ==
Gambrill died in Auckland on 10 February 2026, at the age of 91, having been predeceased by her husband in 2023. The chief justice, Helen Winkelmann, paid tribute to Gambrill's contributions as a master of the High Court, saying:

Anne was exemplary in her discharge of the role: hard working, efficient and legally sound. She helped to establish the role as a permanent and important one within High Court of New Zealand. She was known for her direct manner in court. Counsel could be sure of a fair hearing but equally sure that Anne would be forthright with her constructive criticism, where she considered it due.
