= Cicely Madden =

American rower

Personal information
- Nationality: American
- Born: March 28, 1995 (age 29)

Sport
- Sport: Rowing

Cicely Madden (born March 28, 1995) is an American rower. She competed in the women's quadruple sculls event at the 2020 Summer Olympics.
