= Carlotta Nwajide =

German rower

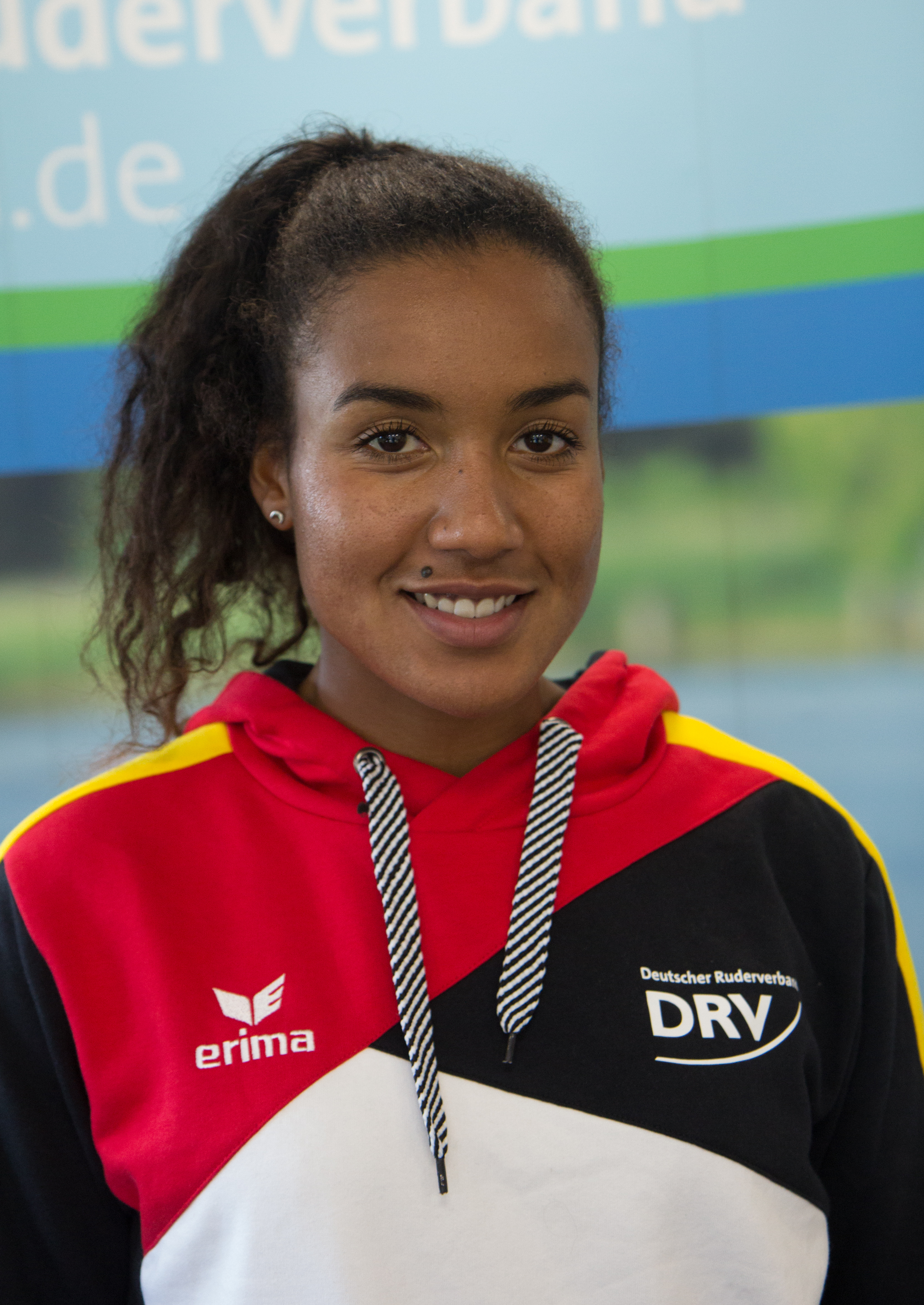
- Nwajide in 2017

Personal information
- Nationality: German
- Born: 12 July 1995 (age 29)

Sport
- Sport: Rowing

Achievements and titles
- Olympic finals: Tokyo 2020 W4X

Carlotta Nwajide (born 12 July 1995) is a German rower. She competed in the women's quadruple sculls event at the 2020 Summer Olympics.
