= Joseph Wilbur =

Panama rower

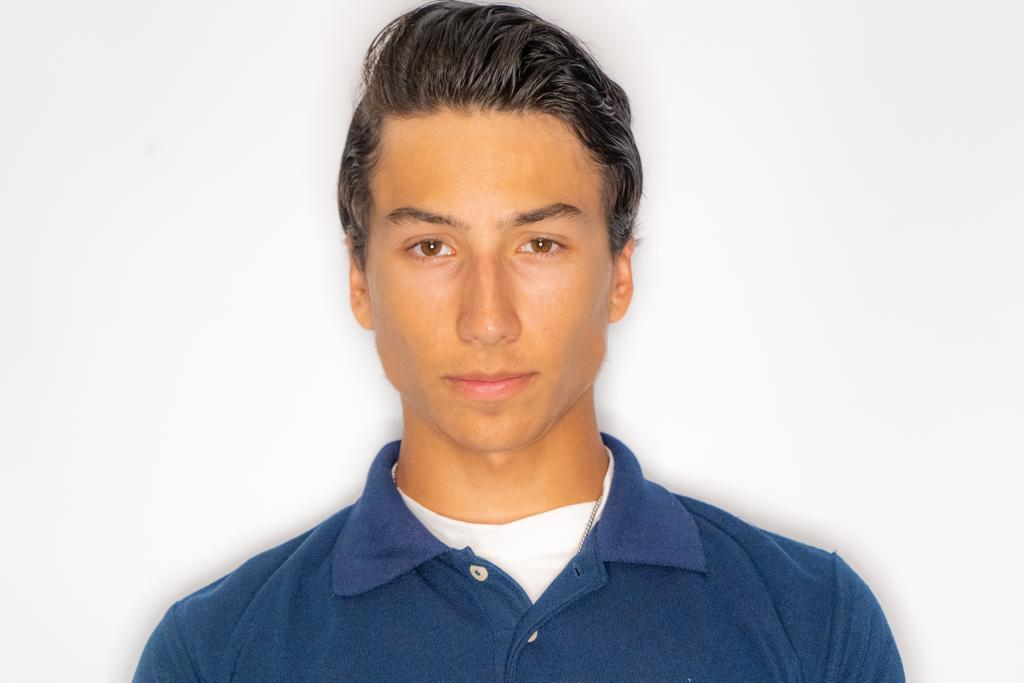

Personal information
- National team: Panama
- Born: 15 August 2001 (age 24)
- Education: University of Pennsylvania
- Height: 180 cm (5 ft 11 in)
- Weight: 70 kg (154 lb)

Sport
- Country: Panama
- Sport: Rowing
- Weight class: Lightweight
Medal record
Rowing
Representing Panama
South American Championship
Bronze medal – third place	2021 Rio de Janeiro	Lwt Single Sculls

Joseph Wilbur (born 15 August 2001) is a Panamanian rower. He participated in the 2019 U23 World Championships and 2019 Junior World Championships. He competed at the 2021 Olympic Qualification Regatta in Rio de Janeiro, Brazil. He earned a bronze medal at the 2021 South American Championships.
