= Iris Crooke =

New Zealand nurse, administrator (1895–1985)

Helen Iris Crooke MBE (14 December 1895 – 23 February 1985) was a New Zealand nurse and voluntary aid administrator. She was born in Lawrence, New Zealand, on 14 December 1895, and attended Nga Tawa Diocesan School from 1910 to 1913.

In the 1946 New Year Honours, Crooke was appointed a Member of the Order of the British Empire, in recognition of her service as head of the Red Cross Voluntary Aid Division.
