= Violaine Aernoudts =

French rower

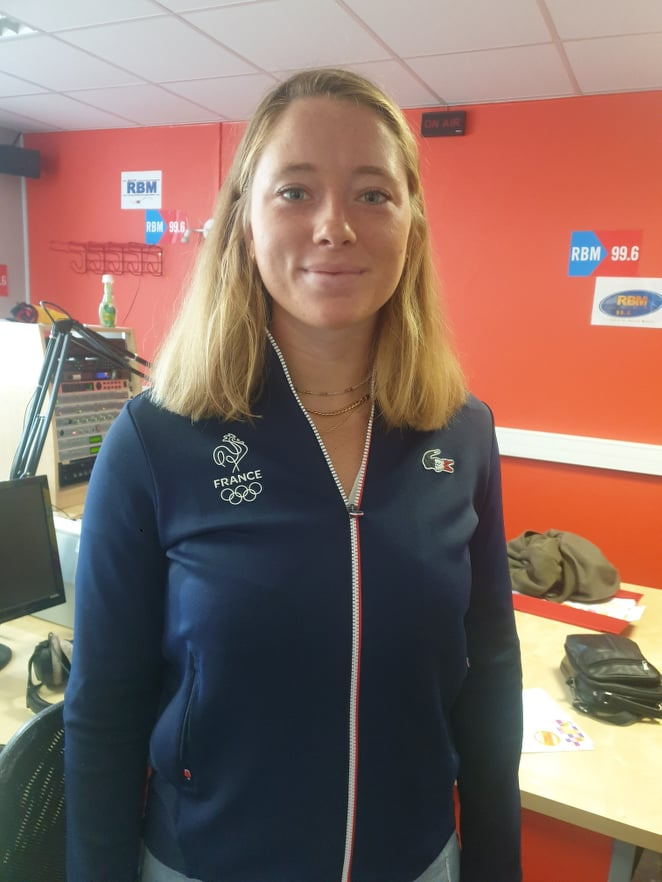
- Violaine Aernoudts in 2021

Personal information
- Nationality: French
- Born: 23 October 1999 (age 26) Alençon, France

Sport
- Sport: Rowing

Violaine Aernoudts (born 23 October 1999) is a French rower. She competed in the women's quadruple sculls event at the 2020 Summer Olympics.
