= Marie Jacquet =

French rower

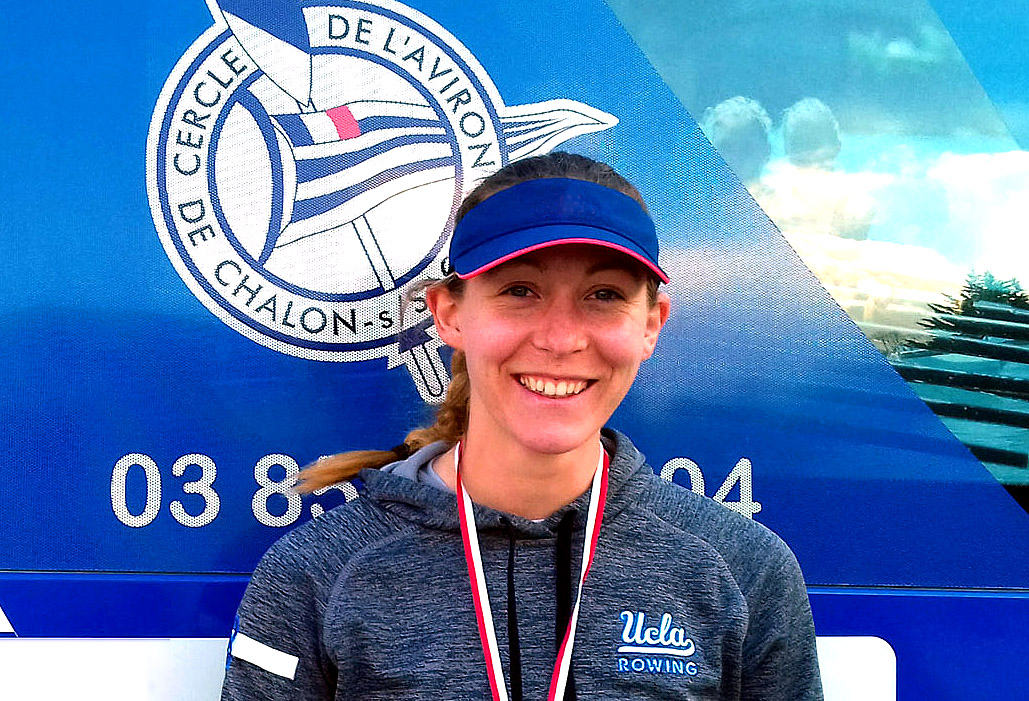
- Jacquet in 2018

Personal information
- Nationality: French
- Born: 29 March 1994 (age 32)

Sport
- Sport: Rowing

Marie Jacquet (born 29 March 1994) is a French rower. She competed in the women's quadruple sculls event at the 2020 Summer Olympics.
