= Steve Tew =

New Zealand rugby union official

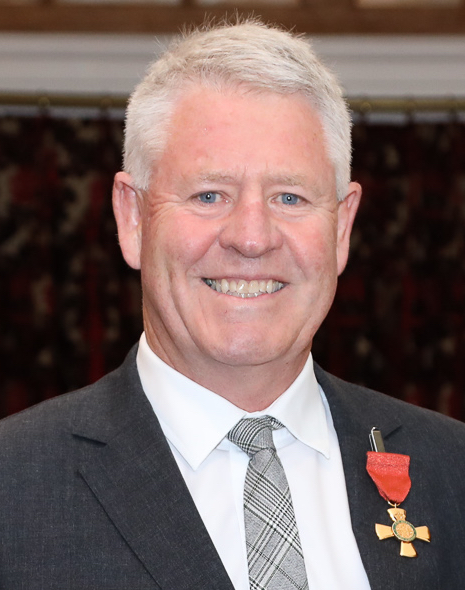
Tew in 2020

Stephen John Tew ONZM (born c. 1958) is a New Zealand sports administrator. He was the chief executive officer of New Zealand Rugby from 2008 to 2019.

== Early life and family ==
Tew attended college at Hutt Valley High School in Lower Hutt and then graduated from Victoria University of Wellington with a master's degree in recreation and administration.

Tew has three daughters with his wife, Michele, including Ruby Tew, who represented New Zealand in rowing at the 2016 Olympics.

== Career ==
Tew's career in sports administration began in 1982 as secretary-general of the New Zealand Universities Sports Union. He served in that role until 1987, when he became the general manager of the Hillary Commission. From 1996 to 2001, he was chief executive of the Canterbury Rugby Union and the Crusaders.

Tew joined Rugby New Zealand as general manager in 2001, and became deputy chief executive in 2003. He took over as chief executive from Chris Moller after the poor showing of the All Blacks in the 2007 Rugby World Cup. Under Tew's tenure, Rugby New Zealand suffered its worst financial result ever in 2009/2010, losing $15.9 million in 2009 due to the global economic recession and investments due to hosting the 2011 Rugby World Cup, before taking steps to improve its revenues, including signing a five-year broadcast deal and securing a sponsorship with Adidas through to 2019.

Tew stepped down from his position as CEO of New Zealand Rugby at the end of 2019. In 2020, he was contracted by Sport New Zealand to conduct a review of the impact of the COVID-19 pandemic on professional sports in New Zealand.

== Honours ==
In the 2020 New Year Honours, Tew was appointed an Officer of the New Zealand Order of Merit, for services to rugby and sports administration.
