= Susan Skerman =

New Zealand artist (1928–2025)

- Born: Susan Catherine Martin Skerman; 8 November 1928; Te Awamutu, New Zealand
- Died: 9 November 2025 (aged 97); Waikanae, New Zealand
- Education: Ilam School of Fine Arts; Central School of Art and Craft
- Known for: Painting

Susan Catherine Martin Skerman (8 November 1928 – 9 November 2025) was a New Zealand artist.

== Early life and education ==
Skerman was born in Te Awamutu on 8 November 1928. She was educated at Nga Tawa Diocesan School and the Ilam School of Fine Arts at the University of Canterbury. She then attended the Central School of Art and Craft in London between 1953 and 1955.

== Career ==
Skerman's first solo exhibition was in Hamilton, 1955. She has also exhibited with:

- Auckland Society of Arts
- New Zealand Academy of Fine Arts
- The Group in 1971
- the Print Council of New Zealand Fifth National Touring Exhibition 1974–1975

Her works were included in the 'bush walk' at Expo '70, a world's fair held in Osaka, Japan. The Bush Panels consisted of 600 perspex panels screen printed with ferns and trees. Following the exhibition, some of the pieces were hung in the New Zealand parliament's Beehive building in Wellington. Others are exhibited in the Waikato Hospital's Older Persons and Rehabilitation Building and at the Adam Art Gallery at Victoria University of Wellington.

Works by Skerman are held in the collection of the Museum of New Zealand Te Papa Tongarewa.

== Death ==
Skerman died in Waikanae on 9 November 2025, at the age of 97.
