= Nga Tawa Diocesan School =

Location
- Calico Line; Marton; New Zealand; 40.0678°S 175.3980°E

Information
- Type: State integrated secondary, day and boarding (Years 9–13)
- Motto: Christo et Ecclesiae ("For Christ and Church")
- Denomination: Anglican
- Established: 1891; 135 years ago
- Ministry of Education Institution no.: 196
- Principal: Lesley Carter
- Gender: Girls
- Enrolment: 198 (July 2026)
- Colours: Navy and gold
- Socio-economic decile: 9Q 1,960 (July 2026)
- Website: www.ngatawa.school.nz

Nga Tawa Diocesan School, also known as the Wellington Diocesan School for Girls, is a state-integrated, Anglican girls’ boarding school situated in the heart of the Rangitikei District. It is located just outside the township of Marton in New Zealand.

== History ==
The school was founded near Shannon in 1891 by Mary Taylor. She named her school Nga Tawa because of the tawa trees that grew nearby. William Birch and his wife Ethel helped found the school and William served on the board of trustees; Birch House is named after them. In 1909, the school relocated from Shannon to Calico Line, where it stands today. The original buildings were destroyed by fire in 1924. Originally a private school, Nga Tawa integrated into the state education system in 1980.

Today, the school has roughly 200 pupils, most of whom are boarders. The school also accepts a growing number of international students. These students mainly come from but are not limited to, Europe and Asia.

== Co-curricular ==
Nga Tawa students participate in a wide variety of sporting disciplines. The focus of the school is on equestrian sport. There is stabling capacity for 80 horses on school grounds as well as a dressage arena, a full-sized showjumping arena, 1200m all-weather canter track, and a cross-country course.

There are multiple cultural activities offered at the school. Nga Tawa students are represented in a varied array of disciplines and arts, particularly given the significantly smaller student body than most of their local competitors

== Academic ==
The school previously offered the International Baccalaureate exams (up until the end of the 2013 academic year) as well as the New Zealand NCEA exams.

== Notable alumnae ==
- Judy Bailey – television newsreader
- Iris Crooke – nurse and volunteer worker, Florence Nightingale Medal recipient
- Anne Gambrill – lawyer and jurist
- Jackie Gowler – rower
- Kerri Gowler – rower
- Virginia Grayson – artist, Dobell Prize winner
- Gil Hanly – photographer
- Paige Hourigan – tennis player
- Georgia Nugent-O'Leary – rower
- Alison Quentin-Baxter – constitutional lawyer
- Rebecca Sinclair – snowboarder
- Susan Skerman – painter
- Shirley Smith – lawyer
