= Stefania Gobbi =

Italian rower (born 1995)

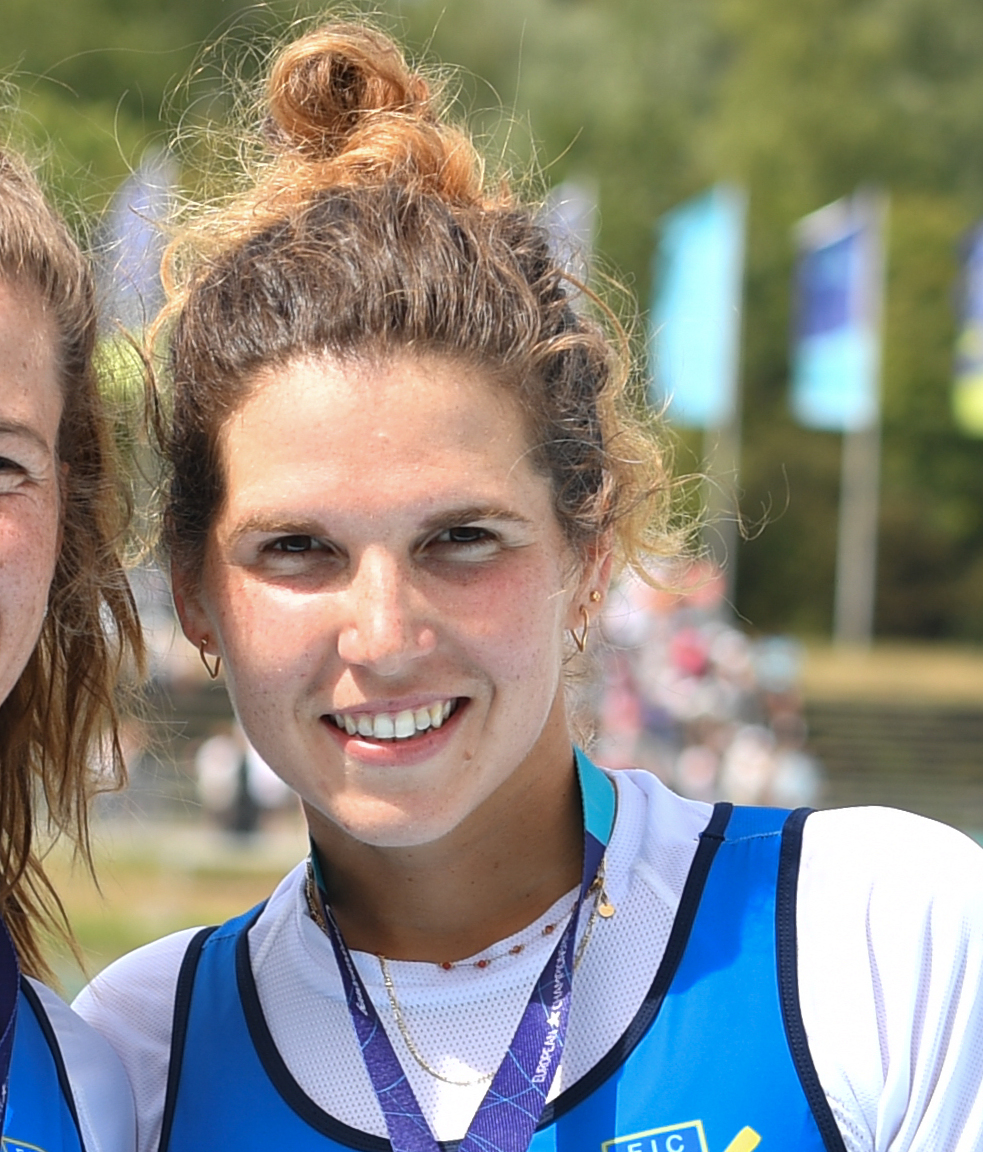

Personal information
- National team: Italy
- Born: 13 April 1995 (age 31) Padua, Italy
- Height: 1.77 m (5 ft 10 in)
- Weight: 73 kg (161 lb)

Sport
- Sport: Rowing
- Club: Canottieri Padova Club.; C.S. Carabinieri

Achievements and titles
- Olympic finals: Tokyo 2020 W4X
Medal record
Women's rowing
Representing Italy
European Championships
Bronze medal – third place	2022 Munich	Double sculls
Bronze medal – third place	2025 Plovdiv	Eight
Event	1st	2nd	3rd
World Coastal Rowing Championships	1	0	0
European Championships	0	0	3
World U23 Championships	0	1	0
World Junior Championships	1	0	0
European Junior Championships	0	1	1

Stefania Gobbi (born 13 April 1995) is an Italian female rower twice bronze medal winner at senior level at the European Rowing Championships. She competed in the women's quadruple sculls event at the 2020 Summer Olympics.

== Biography ==
Stefania Gobbi started her career in 2009, at the Canottieri Padova Club coached by Alberto Rigato. He made his debut in the National Juniores in 2012 by winning a bronze medal at the European Junior Championships in quadruple scull and in 2013 he won the world junior title in quadruple scull, together with Chiara Ondoli., Valentina Iseppi . and Valentina Rodini. In 2014 he joined the U23 national selection and after various participations in European and World Championships in 2017 he won the silver medal at the U23 World Championships in double scull together with Valentina Iseppi . In 2017 he also won the first European Senior Bronze Medal in double scull, together with Kiri Tontodonati. In 2019, always in double scull, she changes scull's partner, Stefania Buttignon., and after winning bronze at the Senior European Championships. At the world championships in Linz they qualify the double scull at the Tokyo Olympics, in this discipline Italy's last participation dates back to the Beijing Olympics in 2008. In 2021 participates in the Tokyo 2020 NE won fourth place in quadruple scull, together with Veronica Lisi and Alessandra Montessano and Valentina Iseppi . In 2021 wins world title in single scull costal rowing In 2022, always in double scull, she changes scull's partner, Kiri Tontodonati.

== Achievements ==
Year	Competition	Venue	Rank	Event	Time
2022	European Championships	(Germany) Munich	3rd	double scull	7:23:04
2021	World Coastal Championships	(Portugal) Oeiras	1st	single scull	34:08:66
2019	World Championships	(Austria) Linz	7th	double scull	6:57.08
2019	European Championships	(Switzerland) Lucerna	3rd	double scull	6:51.38
2017	European Championships	(Czech Republic) Račice	3rd	double scull	7:07.79
2017	U23 World Championships	(Bulgaria) Plovdiv	2nd	double scull	7:04.03
2013	Junior World Championships	(Lithuania) Trakai	1st	quadruple scull	6:34.44
2013	Junior European Championships	(Belarus) Minsk	3rd	quadruple scull	6:37:44
2012	Junior European Championships	(Slovenia) Bled	3rd	quadruple scull	6:44:40
