= Alison Rusher =

American rower

Personal information
- Nationality: American
- Born: May 24, 1996 (age 28); London, England

Sport
- Sport: Rowing

Alison Rusher (born May 24, 1996) is an American rower. She competed in the women's quadruple sculls event at the 2020 Summer Olympics.

== Personal life ==
Rusher was born to Jack Rusher and Cynthia Eckert. Her parents rowed in the 1988 and 1992 Summer Olympics, and met while on the national team. Her brother, Nicholas, is also an Olympic rower.
