= Veronica Lisi =

Italian rower

Personal information
- Nationality: Italian
- Born: 6 October 1987 (age 37); Padua, Italy

Sport
- Sport: Rowing

Achievements and titles
- Olympic finals: Tokyo 2020 W4X

Veronica Lisi (born 6 October 1987) is an Italian rower. She competed in the women's quadruple sculls event at the 2020 Summer Olympics.
