= Chris Moller (businessman) =

New Zealand businessman and sports administrator

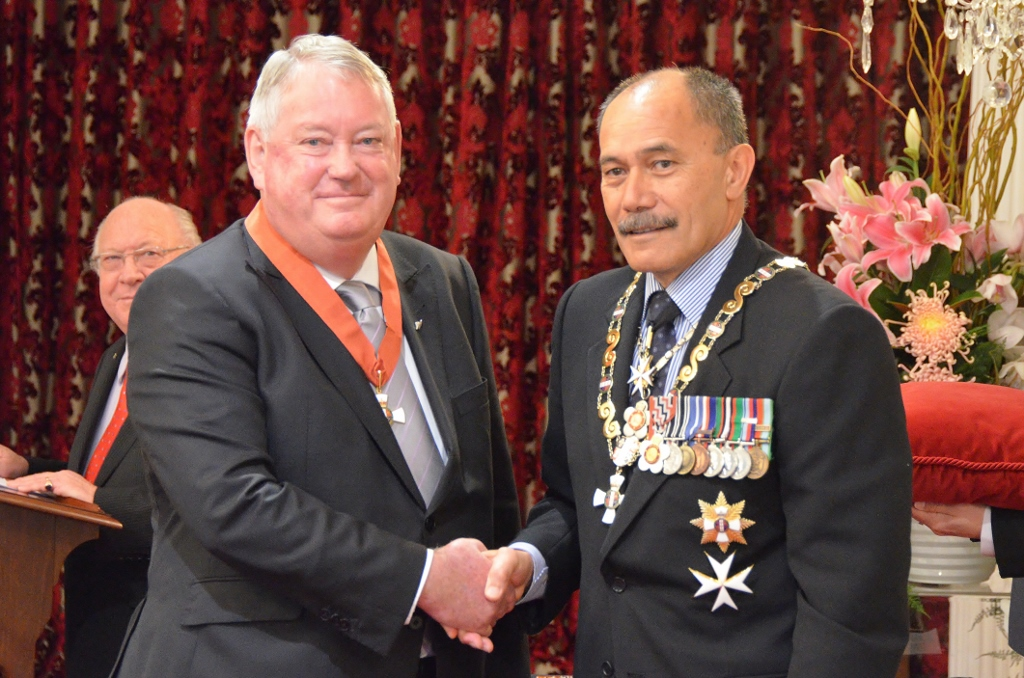
Moller (left) in 2015, after his investiture as a Companion of the New Zealand Order of Merit by the governor-general, Sir Jerry Mateparae

Christopher John David Moller CNZM is a New Zealand businessman and sports administrator. He is a former chief executive officer (CEO) of the New Zealand Rugby Union, and former deputy CEO of New Zealand's largest company, Fonterra. Moller has also worked as managing director for New Zealand Milk Products. He is currently on the IRB council and became CEO of the NZRFU in January 2003. On 2 April 2007 he announced that he would not be renewing his contract as CEO after the 2007 Rugby World Cup. His deputy Steve Tew, was appointed to the role late in 2007.

In the 2015 New Year Honours, Moller was appointed a Companion of the New Zealand Order of Merit for services to business and sport.
