= Ruby Tew =

New Zealand rower

Personal information
- Born: 7 March 1994 (age 32) Wellington, New Zealand
- Education: Queen Margaret College
- Height: 1.81 m (5 ft 11 in)
- Weight: 79 kg (174 lb)
- Relative: Steve Tew (father)

Sport
- Country: New Zealand
- Club: Star Boating Club
Medal record
Women's rowing
Representing New Zealand
World Championships
Silver medal – second place	2015 Aiguebelette	Eight
Bronze medal – third place	2017 Sarasota	Eight

Ruby Tew (born 7 March 1994) is a New Zealand Olympic rower.

== Personal life ==
Born in Wellington, she is the daughter of New Zealand Rugby CEO Steve Tew. She received her secondary education at Queen Margaret College. She is studying towards a Bachelor of Business Studies at Massey University.

== Rowing career ==
Tew took up rowing in 2008 while at Queen Margaret College. She attended her first Maadi Cup in 2009 at Lake Karapiro but did not get into any of the A-finals. At the 2010 Maadi Cup at Lake Ruataniwha, she won a bronze medal in the girls U16 double sculls. At the 2011 Maadi Cup at Lake Karapiro, she reached B-finals in all three of her boat classes.

Tew had her first international appearance at the 2012 World Rowing Junior Championships in Plovdiv, Bulgaria. With the junior quad sculls (with Nathalie Hill, Zoe McBride, and Hannah Osborne), she won bronze at the event. In 2014, she became national champion with the women's premier four, with Rebecca Scown, Linda Matthews, and Holly Greenslade in the team. At the 2015 national championships, she won silver with the women's premier four, this time teamed with Kerri Gowler, Rebecca Scown, and Elizabeth Ross.

Tew won a silver medal at the 2015 World Rowing Championships with the women's eight, qualifying the boat for the 2016 Olympics. At the 2016 national championships, she won gold in the women's premier four with Kerri Gowler, Fiona Paterson, and Holly Greenslade. She won bronze in the women's premier coxless pair oars and the women's premier eight.

With the New Zealand women's eight, she came fourth at the 2016 Rio Olympics. She won a bronze medal with the New Zealand women's eight at the 2017 World Rowing Championships in Sarasota, Florida.
