= Mongolia at the 2020 Summer Olympics =

- IOC code: MGL
- NOC: Mongolian National Olympic Committee
- Website: www.olympic.mn (in Mongolian)

in Tokyo, Japan July 23, 2021 – August 8, 2021
- Competitors: 43 in 10 sports
- Flag bearers (opening): Onolbaatar Khulan; Duurenbayar Ulziibayar
- Flag bearer (closing): Lkhagvagerel Munkhtur
- Medals Ranked 71st: Gold 0 Silver 1 Bronze 3 Total 4

Summer Olympics appearances (overview)
- 1964; 1968; 1972; 1976; 1980; 1984; 1988; 1992; 1996; 2000; 2004; 2008; 2012; 2016; 2020; 2024

Mongolia competed at the 2020 Summer Olympics in Tokyo. Originally scheduled to take place from 24 July to 9 August 2020, the Games were postponed to 23 July to 8 August 2021, because of the COVID-19 pandemic. Since the nation's debut in 1964, Mongolian athletes have appeared in every edition of the Summer Olympic Games, with the exception of the 1984 Summer Olympics in Los Angeles, because of its support of the Soviet boycott.

== Medalists ==
Medal	Name	Sport	Event	Date
Silver	Saeid Mollaei	Judo	Men's 81 kg	27 July
Bronze	Urantsetseg Munkhbat	Judo	Women's 48 kg	24 July
Bronze	Tsogtbaataryn Tsend-Ochir	Judo	Men's 73 kg	26 July
Bronze	Bat-Ochiryn Bolortuyaa	Wrestling	Women's freestyle 53 kg	6 August

== Competitors ==
The following is the list of number of competitors in the Games.

Sport	Men	Women	Total
Archery	1	1	2
Athletics	2	1	3
Basketball	0	4	4
Boxing	2	1	3
Judo	7	5	12
Shooting	1	3	4
Swimming	1	1	2
Table tennis	1	1	2
Weightlifting	0	2	2
Wrestling	3	6	9
Total	18	25	43

== Archery ==
One Mongolian archer qualified for the men's individual recurve by reaching the quarterfinal stage and obtaining one of the three available spots at the 2019 Asian Archery Championships in Bangkok, Thailand. Another Mongolian archer scored a fourth-round triumph to book the last of six available spots in the women's individual recurve at the 2021 Final Qualification Tournament in Paris, France.

Athlete	Event	Ranking round		Round of 64	Round of 32	Round of 16	Quarterfinals	Semifinals	Final / BM	
Athlete	Event	Score	Seed	Opposition Score	Opposition Score	Opposition Score	Opposition Score	Opposition Score	Opposition Score	Rank
Baatarkhuyagiin Otgonbold	Men's individual	646	54	Li Jl (CHN); L 4–6	Did not advance					
Bishindeegiin Urantungalag	Women's individual	614	58	Yamauchi (JPN); L 2–6	Did not advance					
Baatarkhuyagiin Otgonbold; Bishindeegiin Urantungalag	Mixed team	1260	27	—N/a		Did not advance				

== Athletics ==
Mongolian athletes further achieved the entry standards, either by qualifying time or by world ranking, in the following track and field events (up to a maximum of 3 athletes in each event):

Key

- Note–Ranks given for track events are within the athlete's heat only
- Q = Qualified for the next round
- q = Qualified for the next round as a fastest loser or, in field events, by position without achieving the qualifying target
- NR = National record
- N/A = Round not applicable for the event
- Bye = Athlete not required to compete in round

Track & road events

Athlete	Event	Final	
Athlete	Event	Result	Rank
Tseveenravdangiin Byambajav	Men's marathon	2:21:32	54
Bat-Ochiryn Ser-Od	Men's marathon	DNF	
Bayartsogtyn Mönkhzayaa	Women's marathon	2:37:08 SB	45

== Basketball ==
Summary

Team	Event	Group stage								Quarterfinal	Semifinal	Final / BM	
Team	Event	Opposition Score	Opposition Score	Opposition Score	Opposition Score	Opposition Score	Opposition Score	Opposition Score	Rank	Opposition Score	Opposition Score	Opposition Score	Rank
Mongolia women's 3×3	Women's 3×3 tournament	Italy; L 14–15	United States; L 9–21	Japan; L 10–19	ROC; L 5–21	Romania; L 14–22	France; L 18–22	China; L 9–21	8	Did not advance			

=== 3×3 basketball ===
==== Women's tournament ====
Mongolia women's national 3x3 team qualified directly for the Olympics by securing an outright berth, as one of the four highest-ranked squads, in the women's category of the FIBA rankings.

Team roster

- Enkhtaivan Chimeddolgor
- Onolbaatar Khulan
- Bayasgalan Solongo
- Munkhsaikhan Tserenlkham

Group play

Pos	Team	Pld	W	L	PF	PA	PD	Qualification
1	United States	7	6	1	136	98	+38	Semifinals
2	ROC	7	5 (Note: ROC 2–0, China 1–1, Japan 0–2)	2	129	90	+39	Semifinals
3	China	7	5	2	127	97	+30	Quarterfinals
4	Japan (H)	7	5	2	130	97	+33	Quarterfinals
5	France	7	4	3	118	116	+2	Quarterfinals
6	Italy	7	2	5	98	125	−27	Quarterfinals
7	Romania	7	1	6	89	142	−53	
8	Mongolia	7	0	7	79	141	−62	

Source: TOCOG and FIBA
Rules for classification: 1) Wins; 2) Head-to-head record; 3) Points scored.
(H) Hosts
Notes:

24 July 2021
17:30
v

Report

Italy	15–14	Mongolia
Pts: D'Alie 8		Pts: Solongo 7

Aomi Urban Sports Park, Tokyo
Referees: Shi Qirong (CHN), Vlad Ghizdareanu (ROU)

24 July 2021
21:00
v

Report

Mongolia	9–21	United States
Pts: Chimeddolgor 6		Pts: Gray 9

Aomi Urban Sports Park, Tokyo
Referees: Su Yu-yen (TPE), Vlad Ghizdareanu (ROU)

25 July 2021
10:15
v

Report

Japan	19–10	Mongolia
Pts: Mawuli, Yamamoto 6		Pts: Chimeddolgor, Solongo 3

Aomi Urban Sports Park, Tokyo
Referees: Shi Qirong (CHN), Markos Michaelides (SUI)

25 July 2021
14:00
v

Report

Mongolia	5–21	ROC
Pts: Tserenlkham 3		Pts: Kozik, O. Frolkina 8

Aomi Urban Sports Park, Tokyo
Referees: Su Yu-yen (TPE), Vlad Ghizdareanu (ROU)

26 July 2021
10:40
v

Report

Mongolia	14–22	Romania
Pts: Tserenlkham 6		Pts: Ursu-Kim, Mărginean 7

Aomi Urban Sports Park, Tokyo
Referees: Su Yu-yen (TPE), Edmond Ho (HKG)

26 July 2021
17:30
v

Report

France	22–18	Mongolia
Pts: Guapo 9		Pts: Khulan, Tserenlkham 7

Aomi Urban Sports Park, Tokyo
Referees: Evgeny Ostrovskiy (RUS), Sara El-Sharnouby (EGY)

27 July 2021
13:55
v

Report

China	21–9	Mongolia
Pts: Wan 10		Pts: Chimeddolgor 5

Aomi Urban Sports Park, Tokyo
Referees: Cecília Tóth (HUN), Sara El-Sharnouby (EGY)

== Boxing ==
Mongolia entered one male boxer into the Olympic tournament. Rio 2016 Olympian Baatarsükhiin Chinzorig scored an outright quarterfinal victory to reserve a spot in the men's lightweight division at the 2020 Asia & Oceania Qualification Tournament in Amman, Jordan. Baartarsükhiin's teammate Erdenebatyn Tsendbaatar (men's lightweight) and Mönkhbatyn Myagmarjargal (women's middleweight) completed the nation's boxing lineup by topping the list of eligible boxers from Asia and Oceania in their respective weight divisions of the IOC's Boxing Task Force Rankings.

Athlete	Event	Round of 32	Round of 16	Quarterfinals	Semifinals	Final	
Athlete	Event	Opposition Result	Opposition Result	Opposition Result	Opposition Result	Opposition Result	Rank
Erdenebatyn Tsendbaatar	Men's featherweight	Okoth (KEN); W 3–2	Nguyễn (VIE); W 5–0	Batyrgaziev (ROC); L 2–3	Did not advance		
Baatarsükhiin Chinzorig	Men's lightweight	Abduraimov (UZB); L 1–4	Did not advance				
Mönkhbatyn Myagmarjargal	Women's middleweight	—N/a	Price (GBR); L 0–5	Did not advance			

== Judo ==
Mongolia entered 12 judoka into the Olympic tournament based on the International Judo Federation Olympics Individual Ranking.

Men

Athlete	Event	Round of 64	Round of 32	Round of 16	Quarterfinals	Semifinals	Repechage	Final / BM	
Athlete	Event	Opposition Result	Opposition Result	Opposition Result	Opposition Result	Opposition Result	Opposition Result	Opposition Result	Rank
Dashdavaagiin Amartüvshin	−60 kg	—N/a	Tsjakadoea (NED); L 00–01	Did not advance					
Yondonperenlein Baskhüü	−66 kg	—N/a	Bye	Minkou (BLR); W 10–00	Abe (JPN); L 00–01	Did not advance	Lombardo (ITA); L 00–10	Did not advance	7
Tsend-Ochiryn Tsogtbaatar	−73 kg	Bye	Bah (GUI); W 10–00	Bessi (MON); W 11–00	Gjakova (KOS); W 01–00	Ono (JPN); L 00–01	Bye	Margelidon (CAN); W 10–00	3rd place, bronze medalist(s)
Saeid Mollaei	−81 kg	Bye	Khamza (KAZ); W 10–00	Fatiyev (AZE); W 01–00	Grigalashvili (GEO); W 10–01	Borchashvili (AUT); W 10–00	Bye	Nagase (JPN); L 00–01	2nd place, silver medalist(s)
Gantulgyn Altanbagana	−90 kg	Bye	Sherazadishvili (ESP); L 00–01	Did not advance					
Lkhagvasürengiin Otgonbaatar	−100 kg	—N/a	Minaškin (EST); W 01–00	Paltchik (ISR); L 00–01	Did not advance				
Duurenbayar Ulziibayar	+100 kg	—N/a	Oltiboev (UZB); L 00–10	Did not advance					

Women

Athlete	Event	Round of 32	Round of 16	Quarterfinals	Semifinals	Repechage	Final / BM	
Athlete	Event	Opposition Result	Opposition Result	Opposition Result	Opposition Result	Opposition Result	Opposition Result	Rank
Urantsetseg Munkhbat	−48 kg	Bye	Vargas (CHI); W 10–00	Rishony (ISR); W 11–00	Krasniqi (KOS); L 00–01	Bye	Costa (POR); W 10–00	3rd place, bronze medalist(s)
Lkhagvasürengiin Sosorbaram	−52 kg	Keldiyorova (UZB); W 10–00	Kocher (SUI); L 00–01	Did not advance				
Dorjsürengiin Sumiyaa	−57 kg	Kajzer (SLO); L 00–01	Did not advance					
Boldyn Gankhaich	−63 kg	Awiti (MEX); W 10–00	Quadros (BRA); L 000–10	Did not advance				
Otgony Mönkhtsetseg	−78 kg	Lanir (ISR); L 00–10	Did not advance					

Mixed

Athlete	Event	Round of 16	Quarterfinals	Semifinals	Repechage	Final / BM
Athlete	Event	Opposition Result	Opposition Result	Opposition Result	Opposition Result	Rank
Gantulgyn Altanbagana; Ölziibayaryn Düürenbayar; Boldyn Gankhaich; Saeid Mollaei; Otgony Mönkhtsetseg; Dorjsürengiin Sumiyaa; Tsend-Ochiryn Tsogtbaatar	Team	South Korea; W 4–1	ROC; L 2–4	—N/a	Germany; L 2–4	7

== Shooting ==
Mongolian shooters achieved quota places for the following events by virtue of their best finishes at the 2018 ISSF World Championships, the 2019 ISSF World Cup series, and Asian Championships, as long as they obtained a minimum qualifying score (MQS) by May 31, 2020.

Athlete	Event	Qualification		Semifinal		Final	
Athlete	Event	Points	Rank	Points	Rank	Points	Rank
Enkhtaivany Davaakhüü	Men's 10 m air pistol	577	12	—N/a		Did not advance	
Enkhtaivany Davaakhüü	Men's 25 m rapid fire pistol	565	23	—N/a		Did not advance	
Otryadyn Gündegmaa	Women's 10 m air pistol	568	30	—N/a		Did not advance	
Otryadyn Gündegmaa	Women's 25 m pistol	578	26	—N/a		Did not advance	
Oyuunbatyn Yesügen	Women's 10 m air rifle	624.0	25	—N/a		Did not advance	
Oyuunbatyn Yesügen	Women's 50 m rifle 3 positions	1158-45x	27	—N/a		Did not advance	
Tsolmonbaatariin Anudarii	Women's 10 m air pistol	576	9	—N/a		Did not advance	
Tsolmonbaatariin Anudarii	Women's 25 m pistol	572	34	—N/a		Did not advance	
Tsolmonbaataryn Anudari; Enkhtaivany Davaakhüü	Mixed 10 m air pistol team	571	13	Did not advance			

== Swimming ==
Mongolia received a universality invitation from FINA to send two top-ranked swimmers (one per gender) in their respective individual events to the Olympics, based on the FINA Points System of June 28, 2021.

Athlete	Event	Heat		Semifinal		Final	
Athlete	Event	Time	Rank	Time	Rank	Time	Rank
Myagmaryn Delgerkhüü	Men's 50 m freestyle	24.63	48	Did not advance			
Batbayaryn Enkhkhüslen	Women's 50 m freestyle	27.29	51	Did not advance			

== Table tennis ==
Mongolia entered two athletes into the table tennis competition for the first time at the Games. Enkhbatyn Lkhagvasüren and Batmönkhiin Bolor-Erdene scored their zonal-match triumphs for East Asia to book a spot each in the men's and women's singles at the Asian Qualification Tournament in Doha, Qatar.

Athlete	Event	Preliminary	Round of 64	Round of 32	Round of 16	Quarterfinals	Semifinals	Final / BM		
Athlete	Event	Opposition Result	Opposition Result	Opposition Result	Opposition Result	Opposition Result	Opposition Result	Opposition Result	Opposition Result	Rank
Enkhbatyn Lkhagvasüren	Men's singles	Kumar (USA); L 1–4	Did not advance							
Batmönkhiin Bolor-Erdene	Women's singles	Garci (TUN); W 4–1	Vega (CHI); L 0–4	Did not advance						

== Weightlifting ==
Mongolia entered one female weightlifter into the Olympic competition. Erdenebatyn Bilegsaikhan topped the list of weightlifters from Asia in the women's +87 kg category based on the IWF Absolute Continental Rankings.

Athlete	Event	Snatch		Clean & Jerk		Total	Rank
Athlete	Event	Result	Rank	Result	Rank	Total	Rank
Mönkhjantsangiin Ankhtsetseg	Women's −87 kg	110	5	142	3	252	4
Erdenebatyn Bilegsaikhan	Women's +87 kg	85	13	122	12	207	12

== Wrestling ==
Mongolia qualified nine wrestlers for each of the following classes into the Olympic competition. Two of them finished among the top six to book Olympic spots in the men's freestyle 65 kg and women's freestyle 68 kg at the 2019 World Championships, while five additional licenses were awarded to the Mongolian wrestlers, who progressed to the top two finals of their respective weight categories at the 2021 Asian Qualification Tournament in Almaty, Kazakhstan. Two Mongolian wrestlers claimed one of the remaining slots each in the men's freestyle 57 kg and women's freestyle 62 kg, respectively, to complete the nation's roster at the 2021 World Qualification Tournament in Sofia, Bulgaria.

Key:

- VT (ranking points: 5–0 or 0–5) – Victory by fall.
- VB (ranking points: 5–0 or 0–5) – Victory by injury (VF for forfeit, VA for withdrawal or disqualification)
- PP (ranking points: 3–1 or 1–3) – Decision by points – the loser with technical points.
- PO (ranking points: 3–0 or 0–3) – Decision by points – the loser without technical points.
- ST (ranking points: 4–0 or 0–4) – Great superiority – the loser without technical points and a margin of victory of at least 8 (Greco-Roman) or 10 (freestyle) points.
- SP (ranking points: 4–1 or 1–4) – Technical superiority – the loser with technical points and a margin of victory of at least 8 (Greco-Roman) or 10 (freestyle) points.

Freestyle

Athlete	Event	Round of 16	Quarterfinal	Semifinal	Repechage	Final / BM	
Athlete	Event	Opposition Result	Opposition Result	Opposition Result	Opposition Result	Opposition Result	Rank
Erdenebatyn Bekhbayar	Men's −57 kg	Harutyunyan (ARM); W 3–1 ^{PP}	Atri (IRI); L 1–3 ^{PP}	Did not advance			9
Tömör-Ochiryn Tulga	Men's −65 kg	Otoguro (JPN); L 1–3 ^{PP}	Did not advance		Muszukajev (HUN); L 1–3 ^{PP}	Did not advance	9
Mönkhtöriin Lkhagvagerel	Men's −125 kg	Khramiankou (BLR); W 3–1 ^{PP}	Cudinovic (GER); W 3–1 ^{PP}	Steveson (USA); L 0–3 ^{PO}	Bye	Akgül (TUR); L 0–3 ^{PO}	5
Tsogt-Ochiryn Namuuntsetseg	Women's −50 kg	Susaki (JPN); L 0–4 ^{ST}	Did not advance		Yépez (ECU); W 5–0 ^{VB}	Stadnik (AZE); L 0–4 ^{ST}	5
Bat-Ochiryn Bolortuyaa	Women's −53 kg	Aquino (GUM); W 5–0 ^{VT}	Valverde (ECU); W 4–1 ^{SP}	Mukaida (JPN); L 1–3 ^{PP}	Bye	Essombe (CMR); W 4–1 ^{SP}	3rd place, bronze medalist(s)
Boldsaikhan Khongorzul	Women's −57 kg	Rivière (FRA); W 3–1 ^{PP}	Kawai (JPN); L 0–3 ^{PO}	Did not advance	Camara (GUI); W 4–0 ^{ST}	Maroulis (USA); L 0–4 ^{ST}	5
Khürelkhüügiin Bolortuyaa	Women's −62 kg	Malik (IND); W 3–1 ^{PP}	Yusein (BUL); L 0–4 ^{ST}	Did not advance			10
Soronzonboldyn Battsetseg	Women's −68 kg	Larroque (FRA); W 3–1 ^{PP}	Velieva (ROC); W 3–1 ^{PP}	Oborududu (NGR); L 1–3 ^{PP}	Bye	Zhumanazarova (KGZ); L 0–5 ^{VT}	5
Ochirbatyn Burmaa	Women's −76 kg	Minagawa (JPN); L 0–3 ^{PO}	Did not advance				15
