= 2019 FIBA 3x3 World Cup – Women's tournament =

2019 FIBA 3x3 World Cup
Tournament details
- Host country: Netherlands
- City: Amsterdam
- Dates: 18–23 June 2019
- Teams: 20
- Venue: 1 (in 1 host city)

Final positions
- Champions: China (1st title)
- Runners-up: Hungary
- Third place: France
- Fourth place: Australia

Tournament statistics
- MVP: (China) Jiang Jiayin

The 2019 FIBA 3x3 World Cup was held in Amsterdam, the Netherlands. The tournament consisted of 20 teams. Italy were the defending champions but were defeated in the Quarterfinals by France. China won the title, their first overall, after defeating Hungary, 19–13.

== Participating teams ==
All FIBA continental zones except for FIBA Africa & FIBA Americas are represented by at least one team. FIBA announced the final composition of the pools in May, 2019.

FIBA Asia (6)

- China (1)
- Mongolia (2)
- Japan (6)
- Indonesia (10)
- Iran (11)
- Turkmenistan (16)

FIBA Europe (12)

- Russia (3)
- Romania (4)
- France (5)
- Ukraine (7)
- Netherlands (8) (hosts)
- Hungary (9)
- Italy (12)
- Czech Republic (13)
- Switzerland (14)
- Latvia (15)
- Spain (17)
- Andorra (19)

FIBA Oceania (2)

- Australia (18)
- New Zealand (20)

== Players ==
Seed	Team	Players (by rank)					
Seed	Team	1	China	Zhang Zhiting	Jiang Jiayin	Li Yingyun	Wu Di
2	Mongolia	Ganzul Davaasuren	Chimeddolgor Enkhtaivan	Bolor-Erdene Baatar	Solongo Bayasgalan		
3	Russia	Olga Frolkina	Alexandra Stolyar	Anna Leshkovtseva	Anastasia Logunova		
4	Romania	Ancuţa Stoenescu	Gabriela Irimia	Gabriela Mărginean	Sonia Ursu-Kim		
5	France	Migna Touré	Marie-Eve Paget	Ana Maria Filip	Laetitia Guapo		
6	Japan	Miwa Kuribayashi	Kiho Miyashita	Stephanie Mawuli	Minami Iju		
7	Ukraine	Krystyna Filevych	Yevheniia Spitkovska	Nataliia Tsiubyk	Olga Maznichenko		
8	Netherlands	Natalie van den Adel	Loyce Bettonvil	Jill Bettonvil	Fleur Kuijt		
9	Hungary	Klaudia Papp	Dóra Medgyessy	Alexandra Theodorean	Cyesha Goree		
10	Indonesia	Christie Apriyani	Ayu Sriartha	Tricia Mary Aoijs	Dyah Lestari		
11	Iran	Delaram Vakili	Saiedeh Elli	Kimiya Yazdian Tehrani	Shadi Abdolvand		
12	Italy	Marcella Filippi	Giulia Ciavarella	Giulia Rulli	Rae Lin D'Alie		
13	Czech Republic	Andrea Klaudová	Tereza Vorlová	Kristýna Minarovičová	Klára Marečková		
14	Switzerland	Mirjana Milenkovic	Marielle Giroud	Sarah Kershaw	Evita Herminjard		
15	Latvia	Liene Stalidzāne	Baiba Eglīte	Ieva Kūlīte	Kristīna Petermane		
16	Turkmenistan	Leyla Halilova	Nigyara Nagiyeva	Ayna Gokova	Viktoriya Rahmanova		
17	Spain	Aitana Cuevas	Vega Gimeno	Sandra Ygueravide	Núria Martínez		
18	Australia	Rebecca Cole	Alice Kunek	Madeleine Garrick	Keely Froling		
19	Andorra	Claudia Guri	Carla Puntí	Jennifer Carmona	Marta Ballus		
20	New Zealand	Antonia Farnworth	Kalani Purcell	Micaela Cocks	Chevannah Paalvast		

== Main tournament ==
=== Preliminary round ===
==== Pool A ====
Pos	Team	Pld	W	L	PF	PA	PD	Qualification	(China)	(Hungary)	(Netherlands)	(Latvia)	(Turkmenistan)
1	China	4	4	0	74	40	+34	Qualification to knockout stage	—	21–11	13–12	18–12	22–5
2	Hungary	4	3	1	57	48	+9	Qualification to knockout stage	11–21	—	13–11	15–9	18–7
3	Netherlands	4	2	2	58	53	+5		12–13	11–13	—	18–16	17–11
4	Latvia	4	1	3	58	56	+2		12–18	9–15	16–18	—	21–5
5	Turkmenistan	4	0	4	28	78	−50		5–22	7–18	11–17	5–21	—

Source: FIBA
Rules for classification: 1) Wins; 2) Head-to-head record; 3) Points scored; 4) Higher seed.

==== Pool B ====
Pos	Team	Pld	W	L	PF	PA	PD	Qualification	(France)	(Australia)	(Switzerland)	(Japan)	(Andorra)
1	France	4	4	0	75	46	+29	Qualification to knockout stage	—	17–16	20–10	16–14	22–6
2	Australia	4	3	1	76	56	+20	Qualification to knockout stage	16–17	—	20–14	18–16	22–9
3	Switzerland	4	2	2	64	71	−7		10–20	14–20	—	22–20	18–11
4	Japan	4	1	3	67	61	+6		14–16	16–18	20–22	—	17–5
5	Andorra	4	0	4	31	79	−48		6–22	9–22	11–18	5–17	—

Source: FIBA
Rules for classification: 1) Wins; 2) Head-to-head record; 3) Points scored; 4) Higher seed.

==== Pool C ====
Pos	Team	Pld	W	L	PF	PA	PD	Qualification	(Spain)	(Romania)	(Czech Republic)	(Iran)	(Mongolia)
1	Spain	4	4	0	82	49	+33	Qualification to knockout stage	—	21–14	21–14	22–8	18–13
2	Romania	4	3	1	78	45	+33	Qualification to knockout stage	14–21	—	21–13	21–7	22–4
3	Czech Republic	4	2	2	69	64	+5		14–21	13–21	—	22–8	20–14
4	Iran	4	1	3	42	83	−41		8–22	7–21	8–22	—	19–18
5	Mongolia	4	0	4	49	79	−30		13–18	4–22	14–20	18–19	—

Source: FIBA
Rules for classification: 1) Wins; 2) Head-to-head record; 3) Points scored; 4) Higher seed.

==== Pool D ====
Pos	Team	Pld	W	L	PF	PA	PD	Qualification	(Russia)	(Italy)	(New Zealand)	(Ukraine)	(Indonesia)
1	Russia	4	4	0	70	43	+27	Qualification to knockout stage	—	18–10	17–16	13–12	22–5
2	Italy	4	3	1	62	54	+8	Qualification to knockout stage	10–18	—	18–12	17–15	17–9
3	New Zealand	4	2	2	66	49	+17		16–17	12–18	—	17–11	21–3
4	Ukraine	4	1	3	60	52	+8		12–13	15–17	11–17	—	22–5
5	Indonesia	4	0	4	22	82	−60		5–22	9–17	3–21	5–22	—

Source: FIBA
Rules for classification: 1) Wins; 2) Head-to-head record; 3) Points scored; 4) Higher seed.

=== Knockout stage ===
Quarter-finals
China	16
Romania	12
Russia	13
Australia	19
France	15
Italy	9
Spain	18
Hungary	19

Semi-finals
China	15
Australia	14
France	10
Hungary	14

Final
China	19
Hungary	13
Third place
Australia	9
France	21

== Final standings ==
Rank	Team	Record
1st place, gold medalist(s)	China	7–0
2nd place, silver medalist(s)	Hungary	5–2
3rd place, bronze medalist(s)	France	6–1
4	Australia	4–3
5	Spain	4–1
6	Russia	4–1
7	Romania	3–2
8	Italy	3–2
9	Czech Republic	2–2
10	New Zealand	2–2
11	Switzerland	2–2
12	Netherlands	2–2
13	Japan	1–3
14	Ukraine	1–3
15	Latvia	1–3
16	Iran	1–3
17	Mongolia	0–4
18	Andorra	0–4
19	Turkmenistan	0–4
20	Indonesia	0–4

== Awards ==
2019 FIBA 3x3 World Champions – Women's

China
1st title

=== Individual ===
Most Valuable Player

- (China) Jiang Jiayin

Team of the Tournament

- (Hungary) Cyesha Goree
- (China) Jiang Jiayin
- (France) Migna Touré
