= Romania at the 2020 Summer Olympics =

- IOC code: ROU
- NOC: Romanian Olympic and Sports Committee
- Website: www.cosr.ro (in Romanian, English, and French)

in Tokyo, Japan July 23, 2021 – August 8, 2021
- Competitors: 101 in 17 sports
- Flag bearers (opening): Simona Radiș; Robert Glință
- Flag bearer (closing): Cătălin Chirilă
- Medals Ranked 46th: Gold 1 Silver 3 Bronze 0 Total 4

Summer Olympics appearances (overview)
- 1900; 1904–1920; 1924; 1928; 1932; 1936; 1948; 1952; 1956; 1960; 1964; 1968; 1972; 1976; 1980; 1984; 1988; 1992; 1996; 2000; 2004; 2008; 2012; 2016; 2020; 2024; 2028

Romania competed at the 2020 Summer Olympics in Tokyo. Originally scheduled to take place from 24 July to 9 August 2020, the Games were postponed to 23 July to 8 August 2021, because of the COVID-19 pandemic. Since the nation's participation started in 1900 (and its official debut in 1924), Romanian athletes have appeared in every edition of the Summer Olympic Games, except for two occasions: the 1932 Summer Olympics in Los Angeles at the period of the worldwide Great Depression, and the 1948 Summer Olympics in London.

== Medalists ==
Medal	Name	Sport	Event	Date
Gold	Nicoleta-Ancuța Bodnar; Simona Radiș	Rowing	Women's double sculls	28 July
Silver	Ana Maria Popescu	Fencing	Women's épée	24 July
Silver	Mihăiță Vasile Țigănescu; Mugurel Semciuc; Ștefan Constantin Berariu; Cosmin Pascari	Rowing	Men's coxless four	28 July
Silver	Marius Cozmiuc; Ciprian Tudosă	Rowing	Men's coxless pair	29 July

Medals by sport
Sport	1st place, gold medalist(s)	2nd place, silver medalist(s)	3rd place, bronze medalist(s)	Total
Fencing	0	1	0	1
Rowing	1	2	0	3
Total	1	3	0	4

== Competitors ==
The following is the list of number of competitors in the Games. Note that reserves in football are not counted:

Sport	Men	Women	Total
Archery	0	1	1
Athletics	4	6	10
Basketball	0	4	4
Boxing	1	1	2
Canoeing	2	0	2
Cycling	2	0	2
Fencing	1	1	2
Football	18	0	18
Gymnastics	1	2	3
Judo	2	1	3
Rowing	17	19	36
Shooting	0	1	1
Swimming	3	1	4
Table tennis	1	3	4
Tennis	0	3	3
Triathlon	1	0	1
Wrestling	2	3	5
Total	55	46	101

== Archery ==
One Romanian archer qualified for the women's individual recurve by winning the gold medal and booking the first of six available spots at the 2021 Final Qualification Tournament in Paris, France.

Athlete	Event	Ranking round		Round of 64	Round of 32	Round of 16	Quarterfinals	Semifinals	Final / BM	
Athlete	Event	Score	Seed	Opposition Score	Opposition Score	Opposition Score	Opposition Score	Opposition Score	Opposition Score	Rank
Mădălina Amăistroaie	Women's individual	634	37	Long Xq (CHN); L 2–6	Did not advance					

== Athletics ==
Romanian athletes further achieved the entry standards, either by qualifying time or by world ranking, in the following track and field events (up to a maximum of 3 athletes in each event):

Key

- Note–Ranks given for track events are within the athlete's heat only
- Q = Qualified for the next round
- q = Qualified for the next round as a fastest loser or, in field events, by position without achieving the qualifying target
- NR = National record
- N/A = Round not applicable for the event
- Bye = Athlete not required to compete in round

Track & road events

Athlete	Event	Heat		Semifinal		Final	
Athlete	Event	Result	Rank	Result	Rank	Result	Rank
Marius Cocioran	Men's 50 km walk	—N/a				4:01:43	24
Andrea Miklos	Women's 400 m	DNS		Did not advance			
Claudia Bobocea	Women's 1500 m	4:09.19	33	Did not advance			

Field events

Athlete	Event	Qualification		Final	
Athlete	Event	Distance	Position	Distance	Position
Andrei Toader	Men's shot put	19.81	26	Did not advance	
Alin Firfirică	Men's discus throw	61.90	16	Did not advance	
Alexandru Novac	Men's javelin throw	83.27	7 q	79.29	12
Florentina Iusco	Women's long jump	6.36	20	Did not advance	
Alina Rotaru	Women's long jump	6.51	17	Did not advance	
Daniela Stanciu	Women's high jump	1.90	18	Did not advance	
Bianca Ghelber	Women's hammer throw	71.72	11 q	74.18	6

== Basketball ==
Summary

Team	Event	Group stage								Quarterfinal	Semifinal	Final / BM	
Team	Event	Opposition Score	Opposition Score	Opposition Score	Opposition Score	Opposition Score	Opposition Score	Opposition Score	Rank	Opposition Score	Opposition Score	Opposition Score	Rank
Romania women's 3×3	Women's 3×3 tournament	China; L 10–21	Japan; L 8–20	Italy; L 14–22	United States; L 11–22	Mongolia; W 22–14	ROC; L 12–21	France; L 12–22	7	Did not advance			7

=== 3x3 basketball ===
==== Women's tournament ====
Romania women's national 3x3 team qualified directly for the Olympics by securing an outright berth, as one of the four highest-ranked squads, in the women's category of the FIBA rankings, marking the country's return to the sport for the first time since 1952.

Team roster

The players were announced on 8 July 2021.

- Claudia Cuic
- Gabriela Mărginean
- Ancuţa Stoenescu
- Sonia Ursu-Kim

Group play

Pos	Team	Pld	W	L	PF	PA	PD	Qualification
1	United States	7	6	1	136	98	+38	Semifinals
2	ROC	7	5 (Note: ROC 2–0, China 1–1, Japan 0–2)	2	129	90	+39	Semifinals
3	China	7	5	2	127	97	+30	Quarterfinals
4	Japan (H)	7	5	2	130	97	+33	Quarterfinals
5	France	7	4	3	118	116	+2	Quarterfinals
6	Italy	7	2	5	98	125	−27	Quarterfinals
7	Romania	7	1	6	89	142	−53	
8	Mongolia	7	0	7	79	141	−62	

Source: TOCOG and FIBA
Rules for classification: 1) Wins; 2) Head-to-head record; 3) Points scored.
(H) Hosts
Notes:

24 July 2021
10:40
v

Report

China	21–10	Romania
Pts: Wan J, Yang 6		Pts: Cuic 4

Aomi Urban Sports Park, Tokyo
Referees: Marek Maliszewski (POL), Vanessa Devlin (AUS)

24 July 2021
14:25
v

Report

Romania	8–20	Japan
Pts: Ursu-Kim 3		Pts: Mawuli 9

Aomi Urban Sports Park, Tokyo
Referees: Sara El-Sharnouby (EGY), Markos Michaelides (SUI)

25 July 2021
10:40
v

Report

Romania	14–22	Italy
Pts: Mărginean 6		Pts: D'Alie 13

Aomi Urban Sports Park, Tokyo
Referees: Su Yu-yen (TPE), Evgeny Ostrovskiy (RUS)

25 July 2021
17:30
v

Report

Romania	11–22	United States
Pts: Cuic 7		Pts: Plum 12

Aomi Urban Sports Park, Tokyo
Referees: Sara El-Sharnouby (EGY), Marek Maliszewski (POL)

26 July 2021
10:40
v

Report

Mongolia	14–22	Romania
Pts: Tserenlkham 6		Pts: Ursu-Kim, Mărginean 7

Aomi Urban Sports Park, Tokyo
Referees: Su Yu-yen (TPE), Edmond Ho (HKG)

26 July 2021
14:00
v

Report

Romania	12–21	ROC
Pts: three players 4		Pts: O. Frolkina, Logunova 8

Aomi Urban Sports Park, Tokyo
Referees: Vanessa Devlin (AUS), Glenn Tuitt (USA)

27 July 2021
17:00
v

Report

France	22–12	Romania
Pts: Touré 11		Pts: Ursu-Kim, Stoenescu 4

Aomi Urban Sports Park, Tokyo
Referees: Glenn Tuitt (USA), Su Yu-yen (TPE)

== Boxing ==
Romania entered two boxers (one per gender) into the Olympic tournament. Cosmin Gîrleanu (men's flyweight) and Maria Nechita (women's featherweight) secured the spots on the Romanian squad in their respective weight divisions, either by winning the round of 16 match, advancing to the semifinal match, or scoring a box-off triumph, at the 2020 European Qualification Tournament in London and Paris.

Athlete	Event	Round of 32	Round of 16	Quarterfinals	Semifinals	Final	
Athlete	Event	Opposition Result	Opposition Result	Opposition Result	Opposition Result	Opposition Result	Rank
Cosmin Gîrleanu	Men's flyweight	Asenov (BUL); L 0–5	Did not advance				
Maria Nechita	Women's featherweight	Bye	Ali (SOM); W 5–0	Irie (JPN); L 2–3	Did not advance		

== Canoeing ==
=== Sprint ===
Romania qualified a single boat in the men's C-2 1000 m for the Games by finishing fifth in the final race at the 2019 ICF Canoe Sprint World Championships in Szeged, Hungary.

Athlete	Event	Heats		Quarterfinals		Semifinals		Final	
Athlete	Event	Time	Rank	Time	Rank	Time	Rank	Time	Rank
Cătălin Chirilă	Men's C-1 1000 m	4:05.617	1 SF	Bye		4:09.397	6 FB	4:03.973	11
Victor Mihalachi	Men's C-1 1000 m	4:39.865	5 QF	4:15.007	5	Did not advance			
Cătălin Chirilă; Victor Mihalachi	Men's C-2 1000 m	4:00.459	5 QF	3:51.565	3 SF	3:27.399	2 FA	3:29.285	5

Qualification Legend: FA = Qualify to final (medal); FB = Qualify to final B (non-medal)

== Cycling ==
=== Road ===
Romania entered one rider to compete in the men's Olympic road race, by virtue of his top 50 national finish (for men) in the UCI World Ranking.

Athlete	Event	Time	Rank
Eduard-Michael Grosu	Men's road race	Did not finish	

=== Mountain biking ===
Romania entered one mountain biker to compete in the men's cross-country race with a gold-medal victory in the under-23 division at the 2019 UCI Mountain Bike World Championships in Mont-Sainte-Anne, Canada, marking the country's return to the sport at the Olympics for the first time since Athens 2004.

Athlete	Event	Time	Rank
Vlad Dascălu	Men's cross-country	1:26:03	7

== Fencing ==
Romania entered two fencers into the Olympic competition. Set to compete at her fifth consecutive Games, Ana Maria Popescu claimed a spot in the women's épée as one of the two highest-ranked fencers vying for qualification from Europe in the FIE Adjusted Official Rankings. Meanwhile, Iulian Teodosiu rounded out the Romanian roster by winning the final match of the men's sabre at the European Zonal Qualifier in Madrid, Spain.

Athlete	Event	Round of 64	Round of 32	Round of 16	Quarterfinal	Semifinal	Final / BM	
Athlete	Event	Opposition Score	Opposition Score	Opposition Score	Opposition Score	Opposition Score	Opposition Score	Rank
Iulian Teodosiu	Men's sabre	Mamutov (UZB); W 15–11	Curatoli (ITA); W 15–13	Berrè (ITA); L 12–15	Did not advance			
Ana Maria Popescu	Women's épée	Bye	Tikanah (SGP); W 15–10	Song S-r (KOR); W 15–6	Beljajeva (EST); W 15–8	Lehis (EST); W 15–11	Sun Yw (CHN); L 10–11	2nd place, silver medalist(s)

== Football ==
Summary

Key:

- A.E.T – After extra time.
- P – Match decided by penalty-shootout.

Team	Event	Group stage				Quarterfinal	Semifinal	Final / BM	
Team	Event	Opposition Score	Opposition Score	Opposition Score	Rank	Opposition Score	Opposition Score	Opposition Score	Rank
Romania men's	Men's tournament	Honduras; W 1–0	South Korea; L 0–4	New Zealand; D 0–0	3	Did not advance			

=== Men's tournament ===
Romania men's football team qualified for the Games by advancing to the semifinal stage of the 2019 UEFA European Under-21 Championship in Italy, signifying the country's return to the Olympic tournament after 56 years.

Team roster

Romania's initial 22-man squad was announced on 1 July 2021. On 9 July, Dragoș Nedelcu, who was set to complete a loan move to Fortuna Düsseldorf, withdrew from the squad at the request of the club and replaced by Ronaldo Deaconu.

Head coach: Mirel Rădoi

No.	Pos.	Player	Date of birth (age)	Caps	Goals	Club
1	GK	Mihai Popa	12 October 2000 (aged 20)	0	0	(Romanian Football Federation) Astra Giurgiu
2	DF	Radu Boboc	24 April 1999 (aged 22)	2	0	(Romanian Football Federation) Viitorul Constanța
3	DF	Florin Ștefan*	9 May 1996 (aged 25)	2	0	(Romanian Football Federation) Sepsi OSK
4	DF	Alex Pașcanu	28 September 1998 (aged 22)	2	0	(Royal Spanish Football Federation) Ponferradina
5	MF	Tudor Băluță	27 March 1999 (aged 22)	2	0	(Ukrainian Association of Football) Dynamo Kyiv
6	DF	Virgil Ghiță	4 June 1998 (aged 23)	3	0	(Romanian Football Federation) Viitorul Constanța
7	FW	Ion Gheorghe	8 October 1999 (aged 21)	1	0	(Romanian Football Federation) Voluntari
8	MF	Marius Marin (captain)	30 August 1998 (aged 22)	3	0	(Italian Football Federation) Pisa
9	FW	George Ganea	26 May 1999 (aged 22)	3	0	(Romanian Football Federation) Viitorul Constanța
10	MF	Andrei Ciobanu	18 January 1998 (aged 23)	3	0	(Romanian Football Federation) Viitorul Constanța
11	FW	Valentin Gheorghe	14 February 1997 (aged 24)	3	0	(Romanian Football Federation) Astra Giurgiu
12	GK	Mihai Aioani	7 November 1999 (aged 21)	3	0	(Romanian Football Federation) Chindia Târgoviște
13	FW	Eduard Florescu	27 June 1997 (aged 24)	2	0	(Romanian Football Federation) Botoșani
14	DF	Andrei Rațiu	20 June 1998 (aged 23)	2	0	(Royal Dutch Football Association) ADO Den Haag
15	DF	Andrei Chindriș	12 January 1999 (aged 22)	1	0	(Romanian Football Federation) Botoșani
16	MF	Ronaldo Deaconu	20 June 1997 (aged 23)	1	0	(Romanian Football Federation) Gaz Metan
17	DF	Ricardo Grigore	7 April 1999 (aged 22)	3	0	(Romanian Football Federation) Dinamo București
18	MF	Marco Dulca	11 May 1999 (aged 22)	3	0	(Romanian Football Federation) Chindia Târgoviște
19	MF	Andrei Sîntean	16 June 1999 (aged 22)	3	0	(Romanian Football Federation) Hermannstadt
20	FW	Alex Dobre	30 August 1998 (aged 22)	3	0	(French Football Federation) Dijon
21	FW	Antonio Sefer	22 April 2000 (aged 21)	3	0	(Romanian Football Federation) Rapid București
22	GK	Ștefan Târnovanu	9 May 2000 (aged 21)	0	0	(Romanian Football Federation) FCSB

* Overage player.

Group play

Pos	Team	Pld	W	D	L	GF	GA	GD	Pts	Qualification
1	South Korea	3	2	0	1	10	1	+9	6	Advance to knockout stage
2	New Zealand	3	1	1	1	3	3	0	4	Advance to knockout stage
3	Romania	3	1	1	1	1	4	−3	4	
4	Honduras	3	1	0	2	3	9	−6	3	

Source: TOCOG and FIFA
Rules for classification: Group stage tiebreakers
22 July 2021
20:00

Honduras	0–1	Romania
	Report (TOCOG); Report (FIFA)	Oliva 45+1' (o.g.)

Kashima Stadium, Kashima
Referee: Leodán González (Uruguay)

25 July 2021
20:00

Romania	0–4	South Korea
	Report (TOCOG); Report (FIFA)	Marin 27' (o.g.); Um Won-sang 59'; Lee Kang-in 84' (pen.), 90'

Kashima Stadium, Kashima
Referee: Jesús Valenzuela (Venezuela)

28 July 2021
17:30

Romania	0–0	New Zealand
	Report (TOCOG); Report (FIFA)

Sapporo Dome, Sapporo
Referee: Kevin Ortega (Peru)

== Gymnastics ==
=== Artistic ===
Romania entered three artistic gymnasts into the Olympic competition. Going to his sixth Games, Marian Drăgulescu claimed one of the three spots available for individual-based gymnasts and progressed to the finals of the men's vault exercise. On the women's side, 19-year-old rookie Maria Holbură finished 13th out of the 20 gymnasts eligible for qualification in the individual all-around and apparatus events to ensure an Olympic berth for the Romanian squad at the 2019 World Championships in Stuttgart, Germany. Larisa Iordache added another spot for the Romanians to join Holbură on the gymnastics roster for her second trip to the Games after placing fourth in the individual all-around at the 2021 European Championships in Basel, Switzerland.

At the Olympics, Iordache was injured during qualifications, and she withdrew from the rest of the competition.

Men

Athlete	Event	Qualification								Final							
Athlete	Event	Apparatus						Total	Rank	Apparatus						Total	Rank
Athlete	Event	PH	R	V	PB	HB	F	Total	Rank	PH	R	V	PB	HB	F	Total	Rank
Marian Drăgulescu	Vault	—N/a		13.999	—N/a			13.999	16	Did not advance							

Women

Athlete	Event	Qualification						Final					
Athlete	Event	Apparatus				Total	Rank	Apparatus				Total	Rank
Athlete	Event	V	UB	BB	F	Total	Rank	V	UB	BB	F	Total	Rank
Maria Holbură	All-around	13.166	11.100	12.700	12.200	49.166	65	Did not advance					
Larisa Iordache	Balance beam	—N/a		14.133	—N/a	14.133	4 Q	Withdrew due to injury					

== Judo ==
Romania qualified three judoka (two men and one woman) for each of the following weight classes at the Games. London 2012 Olympian Vlăduț Simionescu (men's heavyweight, +100 kg) and two-time Olympian Andreea Chițu (women's half-lightweight, 52 kg) were selected among the top 18 judoka of their respective weight classes based on the IJF World Ranking List of June 28, 2021, while rookie Alexandru Raicu (men's lightweight, 73 kg) accepted a continental berth from Europe as the nation's top-ranked judoka outside of direct qualifying position.

Athlete	Event	Round of 64	Round of 32	Round of 16	Quarterfinals	Semifinals	Repechage	Final / BM	
Athlete	Event	Opposition Result	Opposition Result	Opposition Result	Opposition Result	Opposition Result	Opposition Result	Opposition Result	Rank
Alexandru Raicu	Men's −73 kg	Bye	Ono (JPN); L 00–10	Did not advance					
Vlăduț Simionescu	Men's +100 kg	—N/a	Omar (LBA); W 10–00	Khammo (UKR); L 00–01	Did not advance				
Andreea Chițu	Women's −52 kg	—N/a	Nguyễn (VIE); W 10–00	Giuffrida (ITA); L 00–10	Did not advance				

== Rowing ==
Romania qualified nine out of fourteen boats for each of the following rowing classes into the Olympic regatta, with the majority of crews confirming Olympic places for their boats at the 2019 FISA World Championships in Ottensheim, Austria. Meanwhile, two more crews (men's and women's eight) were added to the Romanian roster with their top-two finish at the 2021 FISA Final Qualification Regatta in Lucerne, Switzerland.

Men

Athlete	Event	Heats		Repechage		Semifinals		Final	
Athlete	Event	Time	Rank	Time	Rank	Time	Rank	Time	Rank
Marius Cozmiuc; Ciprian Tudosă	Pair	6:33.86	1 SA/B	Bye		6:13.51	1 FA	6:16.58	2nd place, silver medalist(s)
Marian Enache; Ioan Prundeanu	Double sculls	6:13.62	3 SA/B	Bye		6:29.55	5 FB	6:16.86	9
Ștefan Constantin Berariu; Cosmin Pascari; Mugurel Semciuc; Mihăiță Vasile Țigănescu	Four	6:03.51	4 R	6:09.72	1 FA	—N/a		5:43.13	2nd place, silver medalist(s)
Constantin Adam; Vlad Dragoș Aicoboae; Sergiu-Vasile Bejan; Alexandru Petrișor Chioseaua; Florin-Nicolae Arteni-Fîntînariu; Ciprian Huc; Florin-Sorin Lehaci; Constantin Radu; Adrian Munteanu (cox)	Eight	5:39.84	3 R	5:27.14	5	—N/a		Did not advance	

Women

Athlete	Event	Heats		Repechage		Semifinals		Final	
Athlete	Event	Time	Rank	Time	Rank	Time	Rank	Time	Rank
Adriana Ailincăi; Iuliana Buhuș	Pair	7:20.36	2 SA/B	Bye		6:58.55	4 FB	7:01.02	9
Nicoleta-Ancuța Bodnar; Simona Radiș	Double sculls	6:49.79	1 SA/B	Bye		7:04.31	1 FA	6:41.03	1st place, gold medalist(s)
Gianina Beleagă; Ionela-Livia Cozmiuc	Lightweight double sculls	7:01.74	1 SA/B	Bye		6:42.08	3 FA	6:49.40	6
Roxana Anghel; Mădălina Hegheș; Elena Logofătu; Cristina Popescu	Four	6:40.02	3 R	6:47.38	3 FB	—N/a		6:35.12	9
Viviana-Iuliana Bejinariu; Amalia Bereș; Mădălina Bereș; Georgiana Dedu; Maria-Magdalena Rusu; Denisa Tîlvescu; Maria Tivodariu; Ioana Vrînceanu; Daniela Druncea (cox)	Eight	6:09.95	2 R	5:52.99	1 FA	—N/a		6:04.06	6

Qualification Legend: FA=Final A (medal); FB=Final B (non-medal); FC=Final C (non-medal); FD=Final D (non-medal); FE=Final E (non-medal); FF=Final F (non-medal); SA/B=Semifinals A/B; SC/D=Semifinals C/D; SE/F=Semifinals E/F; QF=Quarterfinals; R=Repechage

== Shooting ==
Romanian shooters achieved quota places for the following events by virtue of their best finishes at the 2018 ISSF World Championships, the 2019 ISSF World Cup series, European Championships or Games, and European Qualifying Tournament, as long as they obtained a minimum qualifying score (MQS) by July 5, 2021.

Athlete	Event	Qualification		Final	
Athlete	Event	Points	Rank	Points	Rank
Laura-Georgeta Coman	Women's 10 m air rifle	628.0	9	Did not advance	

== Swimming ==
Romanian swimmers achieved qualifying standards in the following events (up to a maximum of 2 swimmers in each event at the Olympic Qualifying Time (OQT), and potentially 1 at the Olympic Selection Time (OST)):

Athlete	Event	Heat		Semifinal		Final	
Athlete	Event	Time	Rank	Time	Rank	Time	Rank
Robert Glință	Men's 100 m backstroke	53.67	12 Q	53.20	8 Q	52.95	8
Robert Glință	Men's 200 m backstroke	1:59.18	26	Did not advance			
Daniel Martin	Men's 100 m backstroke	56.91	38	Did not advance			
Daniel Martin	Men's 100 m butterfly	55.09	53	Did not advance			
David Popovici	Men's 50 m freestyle	22.77	40	Did not advance			
David Popovici	Men's 100 m freestyle	48.03	8 Q	47.72	5 Q	48.04	7
David Popovici	Men's 200 m freestyle	1:45.32	4 Q	1:45.68	7 Q	1:44.68 NR	4
Bianca Costea	Women's 50 m freestyle	25.61	31	Did not advance			
Bianca Costea	Women's 100 m freestyle	56.35	35	Did not advance			

== Table tennis ==
Romania entered four athletes into the table tennis competition at the Games. The women's team secured a berth by advancing to the quarterfinal round of the 2020 World Olympic Qualification Event in Gondomar, Portugal, permitting a maximum of two starters to compete in the women's singles tournament. Meanwhile, Rio 2016 Olympian Ovidiu Ionescu scored a third-stage semifinal triumph to secure one of the five available places in the men's singles at the European Qualification Tournament in Odivelas, Portugal.

Athlete	Event	Preliminary	Round 1	Round 2	Round 3	Round of 16	Quarterfinals	Semifinals	Final / BM	
Athlete	Event	Opposition Result	Opposition Result	Opposition Result	Opposition Result	Opposition Result	Opposition Result	Opposition Result	Opposition Result	Rank
Ovidiu Ionescu	Men's singles	Bye	Yan (AUS); W 4–1	Tsuboi (BRA); L 1–4	Did not advance					
Elizabeta Samara	Women's singles	Bye			Sawettabut (THA); L 1–4	Did not advance				
Bernadette Szőcs	Women's singles	Bye			Liu (USA); L 2–4	Did not advance				
Daniela Dodean; Elizabeta Samara; Bernadette Szőcs	Women's team	—N/a				Egypt; W 3–0	Hong Kong; L 1–3	Did not advance		
Ovidiu Ionescu; Bernadette Szőcs	Mixed doubles	—N/a				Pištej / Balážová (SVK); W 4–1	Xu X / Liu Sw (CHN); L 0–4	Did not advance		

== Tennis ==
Romania entered two tennis players into the Olympic tournament. Rio 2016 Olympians Monica Niculescu and Raluca Olaru teamed up with each other to compete in the women's doubles based on their combined WTA World Rankings of June 13, 2021.

Athlete	Event	Round of 64	Round of 32	Round of 16	Quarterfinals	Semifinals	Final / BM	
Athlete	Event	Opposition Score	Opposition Score	Opposition Score	Opposition Score	Opposition Score	Opposition Score	Rank
Mihaela Buzărnescu	Women's singles	Riske (USA); W 6–7^{(0–7)}, 7–5, 6–4	Vondroušová (CZE); L 1–6, 2–6	Did not advance				
Monica Niculescu; Raluca Olaru	Women's doubles	—N/a	Chan H-c / Chan (TPE); W 7–5, 1–6, [10–6]	Perez / Stosur (AUS); L 6–7^{(3–7)}, 5–7	Did not advance			

== Triathlon ==
Romania entered one triathlete to compete at the Olympics for the first time in history. French-born Felix Duchampt topped the field of triathletes vying for qualification from Europe in the men's event based on the individual ITU World Rankings of 15 June 2021.

Athlete	Event	Time						Rank
Athlete	Event	Swim (1.5 km)	Trans 1	Bike (40 km)	Trans 2	Run (10 km)	Total	Rank
Felix Duchampt	Men's	18:39	0:38	57:42	0:29	31:38	1:49:06	36

== Wrestling ==
Romania qualified four wrestlers for each of the following classes into the Olympic competition. One of them finished among the top six to claim an Olympic slot in the women's freestyle 50 kg at the 2019 World Championships, while three additional licenses were awarded to the Romanian wrestlers, who progressed to the top two finals of the men's freestyle 97 kg, women's freestyle 53 kg, and men's Greco-Roman 130 kg, respectively, at the 2021 World Qualification Tournament in Sofia, Bulgaria.

On June 15, 2021, United World Wrestling awarded an additional Olympic license to Kriszta Incze in the women's freestyle 62 kg, as the next highest-ranked wrestler vying for qualification, citing North Korea's withdrawal from the Games.

Key:

- VT (ranking points: 5–0 or 0–5) – Victory by fall.
- VB (ranking points: 5–0 or 0–5) – Victory by injury (VF for forfeit, VA for withdrawal or disqualification)
- PP (ranking points: 3–1 or 1–3) – Decision by points – the loser with technical points.
- PO (ranking points: 3–0 or 0–3) – Decision by points – the loser without technical points.
- ST (ranking points: 4–0 or 0–4) – Great superiority – the loser without technical points and a margin of victory of at least 8 (Greco-Roman) or 10 (freestyle) points.
- SP (ranking points: 4–1 or 1–4) – Technical superiority – the loser with technical points and a margin of victory of at least 8 (Greco-Roman) or 10 (freestyle) points.

Freestyle

Athlete	Event	Round of 16	Quarterfinal	Semifinal	Repechage	Final / BM	
Athlete	Event	Opposition Result	Opposition Result	Opposition Result	Opposition Result	Opposition Result	Rank
Albert Saritov	Men's −97 kg	Conyedo (ITA); L 1–3 ^{PP}	Did not advance				14
Alina Vuc	Women's −50 kg	Selishka (BUL); L 0–3 ^{PO}	Did not advance				14
Andreea Ana	Women's −53 kg	Kaladzinskaya (BLR); L 0–4 ^{ST}	Did not advance				16
Kriszta Incze	Women's −62 kg	Sastin (HUN); W 3–1 ^{PP}	Tynybekova (KGZ); L 0–5 ^{VT}	Did not advance	Grigorjeva (LAT); L 1–3 ^{PP}	Did not advance	8

Greco-Roman

Athlete	Event	Round of 16	Quarterfinal	Semifinal	Repechage	Final / BM	
Athlete	Event	Opposition Result	Opposition Result	Opposition Result	Opposition Result	Opposition Result	Rank
Alin Alexuc-Ciurariu	Men's −130 kg	López (CUB); L 0–4 ^{ST}	Did not advance		Mirzazadeh (IRI); L 1–3 ^{PP}	Did not advance	12
