= Basketball at the 2020 Summer Olympics =

Basketball at the Games of the XXXII Olympiad
- Basketball pictograms
- Venue: Saitama Super Arena; Aomi Urban Sports Park (3x3)
- Dates: 24 July – 8 August 2021
- No. of events: 4
- Competitors: 352 from 24 nations

Basketball at the 2020 Summer Olympics in Tokyo, Japan was held from 24 July to 8 August 2021. The basketball competitions were held at the Saitama Super Arena in Saitama, while the debuting 3x3 competitions were held at the temporary Aomi Urban Sports Park in Tokyo.

== Medal summary ==
=== Medal table ===
* Host nation (Japan)

Rank	NOC	Gold	Silver	Bronze	Total
1	United States	3	0	0	3
2	Latvia	1	0	0	1
3	ROC	0	2	0	2
4	France	0	1	1	2
5	Japan*	0	1	0	1
6	Australia	0	0	1	1
6	China	0	0	1	1
6	Serbia	0	0	1	1
Totals (8 entries)		4	4	4	12

=== Events ===
Event	Gold	Silver	Bronze
Men	United States; Bam Adebayo; Devin Booker; Kevin Durant; Jerami Grant; Draymond Green; Jrue Holiday; Keldon Johnson; Zach LaVine; Damian Lillard; JaVale McGee; Khris Middleton; Jayson Tatum	France; Andrew Albicy; Nicolas Batum; Petr Cornelie; Nando de Colo; Moustapha Fall; Evan Fournier; Rudy Gobert; Thomas Heurtel; Timothé Luwawu-Cabarrot; Frank Ntilikina; Vincent Poirier; Guerschon Yabusele	Australia; Aron Baynes; Matthew Dellavedova; Dante Exum; Chris Goulding; Josh Green; Joe Ingles; Nick Kay; Jock Landale; Patty Mills; Duop Reath; Nathan Sobey; Matisse Thybulle
Women	United States; Ariel Atkins; Sue Bird; Tina Charles; Napheesa Collier; Skylar Diggins-Smith; Sylvia Fowles; Chelsea Gray; Brittney Griner; Jewell Loyd; Breanna Stewart; Diana Taurasi; A'ja Wilson	Japan; Himawari Akaho; Saki Hayashi; Rui Machida; Evelyn Mawuli; Saori Miyazaki; Yuki Miyazawa; Naho Miyoshi; Nako Motohashi; Moeko Nagaoka; Monica Okoye; Maki Takada; Nanaka Todo	France; Alexia Chartereau; Héléna Ciak; Alix Duchet; Marine Fauthoux; Sandrine Gruda; Marine Johannès; Sarah Michel; Endéné Miyem; Iliana Rupert; Diandra Tchatchouang; Valériane Vukosavljević; Gabby Williams
Men 3x3	Latvia; Agnis Čavars; Edgars Krūmiņš; Kārlis Lasmanis; Nauris Miezis	ROC; Ilia Karpenkov; Kirill Pisklov; Stanislav Sharov; Alexander Zuev	Serbia; Dušan Domović Bulut; Dejan Majstorović; Aleksandar Ratkov; Mihailo Vasić
Women 3x3	United States; Stefanie Dolson; Allisha Gray; Kelsey Plum; Jackie Young	ROC; Evgeniia Frolkina; Olga Frolkina; Yulia Kozik; Anastasia Logunova	China; Wan Jiyuan; Wang Lili; Yang Shuyu; Zhang Zhiting

== Qualification summary ==
NOC	Men		Women		Total
NOC	5-on-5	3x3	5-on-5	3x3	Athletes
Argentina	Yes				12
Australia	Yes		Yes		24
Belgium		Yes	Yes		16
Canada			Yes		12
China		Yes	Yes	Yes	20
Czech Republic	Yes				12
France	Yes		Yes	Yes	28
Germany	Yes				12
Iran	Yes				12
Italy	Yes			Yes	16
Japan	Yes	Yes	Yes	Yes	32
Latvia		Yes			4
Mongolia				Yes	4
Netherlands		Yes			4
Nigeria	Yes		Yes		24
Poland		Yes			4
Puerto Rico			Yes		12
Romania				Yes	4
ROC		Yes		Yes	8
Serbia		Yes	Yes		16
Slovenia	Yes				12
South Korea			Yes		12
Spain	Yes		Yes		24
United States	Yes		Yes	Yes	28
Total: 24 NOCs	12	8	12	8	352

== 5-on-5 basketball ==
=== Qualification ===
The National Olympic Committees may enter only one 12-player men's team and only one 12-player women's team. The men's qualification was impacted by the COVID-19 pandemic whereas the women's qualification ended on time and unaffected.

==== Men's qualification ====
Means of qualification		Date	Venue	Berths	Qualified
Host nation		—N/a	—N/a	1	Japan
2019 FIBA Basketball World Cup	Africa	31 August – 15 September 2019	China	1	Nigeria
2019 FIBA Basketball World Cup	Americas	31 August – 15 September 2019	China	2	Argentina
2019 FIBA Basketball World Cup	Americas	31 August – 15 September 2019	China	2	United States
2019 FIBA Basketball World Cup	Asia	31 August – 15 September 2019	China	1	Iran
2019 FIBA Basketball World Cup	Europe	31 August – 15 September 2019	China	2	France
2019 FIBA Basketball World Cup	Europe	31 August – 15 September 2019	China	2	Spain
2019 FIBA Basketball World Cup	Oceania	31 August – 15 September 2019	China	1	Australia
2020 FIBA Men's Olympic Qualifying Tournaments		29 June – 4 July 2021	(Canada) Victoria	1	Czech Republic
2020 FIBA Men's Olympic Qualifying Tournaments		29 June – 4 July 2021	(Croatia) Split	1	Germany
2020 FIBA Men's Olympic Qualifying Tournaments		29 June – 4 July 2021	(Lithuania) Kaunas	1	Slovenia
2020 FIBA Men's Olympic Qualifying Tournaments		29 June – 4 July 2021	(Serbia) Belgrade	1	Italy
Total				12	

==== Women's qualification ====
Twelve teams qualified for the women's tournament. The host nation and the 2018 World Cup winners qualified. Those two teams, however, had to play in the pre-qualifying and qualifying tournaments and each took up one of the qualifying spots from those tournaments. Thus, while two of the World Qualifying Tournaments provided quota spots to their three top teams, the other two tournaments provided quota spots only to the top two teams plus either the host nation or the World Cup winners.

Teams had to qualify for the World Olympic Qualifying Tournaments through Women's EuroBasket or Pre-Olympic Qualifying Tournaments (which themselves had to be qualified for through Continental Cups).

Means of qualification	Date	Venue	Berths	Qualified
Host nation	—N/a	—N/a	1	Japan
2018 FIBA Women's Basketball World Cup	22–30 September 2018	Spain	1	United States
2020 FIBA Women's Olympic Qualifying Tournaments	6–9 February 2020	(Belgium) Ostend	2	Belgium
2020 FIBA Women's Olympic Qualifying Tournaments	6–9 February 2020	(Belgium) Ostend	2	Canada
2020 FIBA Women's Olympic Qualifying Tournaments	6–9 February 2020	(France) Bourges	3	Australia
2020 FIBA Women's Olympic Qualifying Tournaments	6–9 February 2020	(France) Bourges	3	France
2020 FIBA Women's Olympic Qualifying Tournaments	6–9 February 2020	(France) Bourges	3	Puerto Rico
2020 FIBA Women's Olympic Qualifying Tournaments	6–9 February 2020	(Serbia) Belgrade	2	Nigeria
2020 FIBA Women's Olympic Qualifying Tournaments	6–9 February 2020	(Serbia) Belgrade	2	Serbia
2020 FIBA Women's Olympic Qualifying Tournaments	6–9 February 2020	(Serbia) Belgrade	3	China
2020 FIBA Women's Olympic Qualifying Tournaments	6–9 February 2020	(Serbia) Belgrade	3	South Korea
2020 FIBA Women's Olympic Qualifying Tournaments	6–9 February 2020	(Serbia) Belgrade	3	Spain
Total			12	

=== Competition schedule ===
Legend
G	Group stage	¼	Quarter-finals	½	Semi-finals	B	Bronze medal match	F	Gold medal match

Date Event	Sat 24	Sun 25	Mon 26	Tue 27		Wed 28			Thu 29	Fri 30	Sat 31	Sun 1	Mon 2	Tue 3	Wed 4	Thu 5	Fri 6	Sat 7		Sun 8
Men		G	G			G			G		G	G		¼		½		F	B	
Women			G	G					G	G		G	G		¼		½	B		F
3x3 Men	G	G	G	G	¼	½	B	F												
3x3 Women	G	G	G	G	¼	½	B	F												

=== Men's tournament ===
==== Preliminary round ====
===== Group A =====
Pos	Team	Pld	W	L	PF	PA	PD	Pts	Qualification
1	France	3	3	0	259	215	+44	6	Quarterfinals
2	United States	3	2	1	315	233	+82	5	Quarterfinals
3	Czech Republic	3	1	2	245	294	−49	4	
4	Iran	3	0	3	206	283	−77	3	

Source: TOCOG and FIBA
Rules for classification: 1) classification points; 2) head-to-head results; 3) head-to-head game points difference; 4) head-to-head number of game points scored.

===== Group B =====
Pos	Team	Pld	W	L	PF	PA	PD	Pts	Qualification
1	Australia	3	3	0	259	226	+33	6	Quarterfinals
2	Italy	3	2	1	255	239	+16	5	Quarterfinals
3	Germany	3	1	2	257	273	−16	4	Quarterfinals
4	Nigeria	3	0	3	230	263	−33	3	

Source: TOCOG and FIBA
Rules for classification: 1) classification points; 2) head-to-head results; 3) head-to-head game points difference; 4) head-to-head number of game points scored.

===== Group C =====
Pos	Team	Pld	W	L	PF	PA	PD	Pts	Qualification
1	Slovenia	3	3	0	329	268	+61	6	Quarterfinals
2	Spain	3	2	1	256	243	+13	5	Quarterfinals
3	Argentina	3	1	2	268	276	−8	4	Quarterfinals
4	Japan (H)	3	0	3	235	301	−66	3	

Source: TOCOG and FIBA
Rules for classification: 1) classification points; 2) head-to-head results; 3) head-to-head game points difference; 4) head-to-head number of game points scored.
(H) Hosts

===== Third-placed team rankings =====
Pos	Grp	Team	Pld	W	L	PF	PA	PD	Pts	Qualification
1	C	Argentina	3	1	2	268	276	−8	4	Quarterfinals
2	B	Germany	3	1	2	257	273	−16	4	Quarterfinals
3	A	Czech Republic	3	1	2	245	294	−49	4	

Source: TOCOG and FIBA
Rules for classification: 1) classification points; 2) game points difference; 3) number of game points scored; 4) FIBA ranking.

==== Knockout stage ====
Quarterfinals
3 August
Italy	75
France	84
3 August
Slovenia	94
Germany	70
3 August
Spain	81
United States	95
3 August
Australia	97
Argentina	59

Semifinals
5 August
France	90
Slovenia	89
5 August
United States	97
Australia	78

Gold medal
7 August
France	82
United States	87
Bronze medal
7 August
Slovenia	93
Australia	107

==== Final standings ====
Rank	Team	Pld	W	L	PF	PA	PD	Standing	New rank
1st place, gold medalist(s)	United States	6	5	1	594	474	+120		1
2nd place, silver medalist(s)	France	6	5	1	515	466	+49		5 (▲2)
3rd place, bronze medalist(s)	Australia	6	5	1	541	475	+66		3
4th	Slovenia	6	4	2	605	535	+70		4 (▲12)
Eliminated at the quarterfinals
5th	Italy	4	2	2	330	323	+7	B–2nd	8 (▲2)
6th	Spain	4	2	2	337	338	−1	C–2nd	2
7th	Argentina	4	1	3	327	373	−46	C–3rd	7 (▼3)
8th	Germany	4	1	3	327	367	−40	B–3rd	11 (▲6)
Eliminated in the preliminary round
9th	Czech Republic	3	1	2	245	294	−49	A–3rd	12
10th	Nigeria	3	0	3	230	263	−33	B–4th	23 (▼1)
11th	Japan	3	0	3	235	301	–66	C–4th	35 (▲7)
12th	Iran	3	0	3	206	283	−77	A–4th	22 (▲1)

==== Statistical leaders ====
Statistic	Name	Total	Per game/Pct.
Points	(Slovenia) Luka Dončić	143	23.8
Rebounds	(Slovenia) Mike Tobey	63	10.5
Assists	(Slovenia) Luka Dončić	57	9.5
Steals	(Australia) Matisse Thybulle	18	3
Blocks	(United States) 3 players	7	1.2
3-point field goals	(Australia) Patty Mills	22	.393
Free throws	(Slovenia) Luka Dončić	30	.698

=== Women's tournament ===
==== Preliminary round ====
===== Group A =====
Pos	Team	Pld	W	L	PF	PA	PD	Pts	Qualification
1	Spain	3	3	0	234	205	+29	6	Quarterfinals
2	Serbia	3	2	1	207	214	−7	5	Quarterfinals
3	Canada	3	1	2	208	201	+7	4	
4	South Korea	3	0	3	183	212	−29	3	

Source: TOCOG and FIBA
Rules for classification: 1) classification points; 2) head-to-head results; 3) head-to-head game points difference; 4) head-to-head number of game points scored.

===== Group B =====
Pos	Team	Pld	W	L	PF	PA	PD	Pts	Qualification
1	United States	3	3	0	260	223	+37	6	Quarterfinals
2	Japan (H)	3	2	1	245	239	+6	5	Quarterfinals
3	France	3	1	2	239	229	+10	4	Quarterfinals
4	Nigeria	3	0	3	217	270	−53	3	

Source: TOCOG and FIBA
Rules for classification: 1) classification points; 2) head-to-head results; 3) head-to-head game points difference; 4) head-to-head number of game points scored.
(H) Hosts

===== Group C =====
Pos	Team	Pld	W	L	PF	PA	PD	Pts	Qualification
1	China	3	3	0	247	191	+56	6	Quarterfinals
2	Belgium	3	2	1	234	196	+38	5	Quarterfinals
3	Australia	3	1	2	240	230	+10	4	Quarterfinals
4	Puerto Rico	3	0	3	176	280	−104	3	

Source: TOCOG and FIBA
Rules for classification: 1) classification points; 2) head-to-head results; 3) head-to-head game points difference; 4) head-to-head number of game points scored.

===== Third-placed team rankings =====
Pos	Grp	Team	Pld	W	L	PF	PA	PD	Pts	Qualification
1	C	Australia	3	1	2	240	230	+10	4	Quarterfinals
2	B	France	3	1	2	239	229	+10	4	Quarterfinals
3	A	Canada	3	1	2	208	201	+7	4	

Source: TOCOG and FIBA
Rules for classification: 1) classification points; 2) game points difference; 3) number of game points scored; 4) FIBA ranking.

==== Knockout stage ====
Quarterfinals
4 August
Australia	55
United States	79
4 August
China	70
Serbia	77
4 August
Japan	86
Belgium	85
4 August
Spain	64
France	67

Semifinals
6 August
United States	79
Serbia	59
6 August
Japan	87
France	71

Gold medal
8 August
United States	90
Japan	75
Bronze medal
7 August
Serbia	76
France	91

==== Final standings ====
Rank	Team	Record
Gold medal	United States	6–0
Silver medal	Japan	4–2
Bronze medal	France	3–3
4	Serbia	3–3
5	China	3–1
6	Spain	3–1
7	Belgium	2–2
8	Australia	1–3
9	Canada	1–2
10	South Korea	0–3
11	Nigeria	0–3
12	Puerto Rico	0–3

==== Statistical leaders ====
Statistic	Name	Total	Per game/Pct.
Points	(Belgium) Emma Meesseman	107	26.8
Rebounds	(United States) Brenna Stewart	60	10.5
Assists	(Japan) Rui Machida	75	12.5
Steals	(France) Gabby Williams	17	2.8
Blocks	(United States) A'ja Wilson	11	1.8
3-point field goals	(Japan) Yuki Miyazawa	19	.432
Free throws	(United States) A'ja Wilson	23	.793

== 3x3 basketball ==
On June 9, 2017, the International Olympic Committee announced that 3x3 basketball would be contested at the Summer Olympics for the first time in 2020.

=== Qualification ===
Qualification for 3x3 determined the eight teams in each of the men's and women's tournaments. The host country, Japan, was guaranteed only one place, not one per gender. Four teams per gender (reduced to three if Japan uses its guaranteed place) were determined via world ranking. Three teams per gender were selected through an Olympic Qualifying Tournament. The final team per gender were determined in a Universality Olympic Qualifying Tournament.

==== Men ====
Means of qualification	Date(s)	Location	Berth(s)	Qualifier(s)
Host nation	—N/a	—N/a	1	Japan
FIBA 3x3 World Ranking	1 November 2019	(Japan) Utsunomiya	3	China; ROC; Serbia
2021 FIBA 3x3 Olympic Qualifying Tournament	26–30 May 2021	(Austria) Graz	3	Poland; Netherlands; Latvia
2021 FIBA Universality Olympic Qualifying Tournament	4–6 June 2021	(Hungary) Debrecen	1	Belgium
Total			8	

==== Women ====
Means of qualification	Date(s)	Location	Berth(s)	Qualifier(s)
Host nation	—N/a	—N/a	0	—N/a
FIBA 3x3 World Ranking	1 November 2019	(Japan) Utsunomiya	4	ROC; China; Mongolia; Romania
2021 FIBA 3x3 Women's Olympic Qualifying Tournament	26–30 May 2021	(Austria) Graz	3	United States; France; Japan
2020 FIBA Universality Olympic Qualifying Tournament	4–6 June 2021	(Hungary) Debrecen	1	Italy
Total			8	

=== Men's tournament ===
==== Pool ====
Pos	Team	Pld	W	L	PF	PA	PD	Qualification
1	Serbia	7	7	0	138	91	+47	Semifinals
2	Belgium	7	4 (Note: Belgium 2–0, Latvia 1–1, Netherlands 0–2)	3	126	127	−1	Semifinals
3	Latvia	7	4	3	133	129	+4	Quarterfinals
4	Netherlands	7	4	3	132	129	+3	Quarterfinals
5	ROC	7	3	4	116	125	−9	Quarterfinals
6	Japan (H)	7	2 (Note: Japan 1–1, 123 PS; Poland 1–1, 120 PS; China 1–1, 119 PS)	5	123	134	−11	Quarterfinals
7	Poland	7	2	5	120	130	−10	
8	China	7	2	5	119	142	−23	

Source: TOCOG and FIBA
Rules for classification: 1) Wins; 2) Head-to-head record; 3) Points scored.
(H) Hosts

==== Knockout stage ====
Quarterfinals
27 July
Netherlands	19
ROC	21
27 July
Latvia	21
Japan	18

Semifinals
28 July
Serbia	10
ROC	21
28 July
Belgium	8
Latvia	21

Gold medal
28 July
ROC	18
Latvia	21
Bronze medal
28 July
Serbia	21
Belgium	10

==== Final standings ====
Rank	Team
Gold medal	Latvia
Silver medal	ROC
Bronze medal	Serbia
4	Belgium
5	Netherlands
6	Japan
7	Poland
8	China

=== Women's tournament ===
==== Pool ====
Pos	Team	Pld	W	L	PF	PA	PD	Qualification
1	United States	7	6	1	136	98	+38	Semifinals
2	ROC	7	5 (Note: ROC 2–0, China 1–1, Japan 0–2)	2	129	90	+39	Semifinals
3	China	7	5	2	127	97	+30	Quarterfinals
4	Japan (H)	7	5	2	130	97	+33	Quarterfinals
5	France	7	4	3	118	116	+2	Quarterfinals
6	Italy	7	2	5	98	125	−27	Quarterfinals
7	Romania	7	1	6	89	142	−53	
8	Mongolia	7	0	7	79	141	−62	

Source: TOCOG and FIBA
Rules for classification: 1) Wins; 2) Head-to-head record; 3) Points scored.
(H) Hosts

==== Knockout stage ====
Quarterfinals
27 July
Japan	14
France	16
27 July
China	19
Italy	13

Semifinals
28 July
United States	18
France	16
28 July
ROC	21
China	14

Gold medal
28 July
United States	18
ROC	15
Bronze medal
28 July
France	14
China	16

==== Final standings ====
Rank	Team	Pld	W	L
Gold medal	United States	9	8	1
Silver medal	ROC	9	6	3
Bronze medal	China	10	7	3
4	France	10	5	5
5	Japan	8	5	3
6	Italy	8	2	6
7	Romania	7	1	6
8	Mongolia	7	0	7

== See also ==
- Wheelchair basketball at the 2020 Summer Paralympics
