= Basketball at the 2020 Summer Olympics – Women's 3x3 tournament =

Tournament details
- Host country: Japan
- City: Tokyo
- Dates: 24–28 July 2021
- Teams: 8 (from 3 confederations)
- Venue: 1 (in 1 host city)

Final positions
- Champions: United States (1st title)
- Runners-up: ROC
- Third place: China
- Fourth place: France

The 2020 Summer Olympics women's 3x3 basketball tournament in Tokyo, began on 24 and ended on 28 July 2021. All games were played at the Aomi Urban Sports Park.

It was originally scheduled to be held in 2020, but on 24 March 2020, the Olympics were postponed to 2021 due to the COVID-19 pandemic. Because of this pandemic, the games were played behind closed doors.

The United States won the title after defeating the Russian Olympic team in the final, while China captured the bronze medal over France.

The medals for the competition were presented by Samira Asghari, Afghanistan; IOC Member, and the medalists' bouquets were presented by Ingo Weiss, Germany; FIBA Treasurer.

== Format ==
The eight teams played a round robin. The teams placed first and second in the pool qualified for the semifinals. The teams three to six played a playoff. After that, a knockout system was used.

== Competition schedule ==
Legend
G	Group stage	¼	Quarter-finals	½	Semi-finals	B	Bronze medal match	F	Gold medal match

Sat 24	Sun 25	Mon 26	Tue 27		Wed 28		
G	G	G	G	¼	½	B	F

== Qualification ==
Means of qualification	Date(s)	Location	Berth(s)	Qualifier(s)
Host nation	—N/a	—N/a	0	—N/a
FIBA 3x3 World Ranking	1 November 2019	(Japan) Utsunomiya	4	ROC; China; Mongolia; Romania
2021 FIBA 3x3 Women's Olympic Qualifying Tournament	26–30 May 2021	(Austria) Graz	3	United States; France; Japan
2020 FIBA Universality Olympic Qualifying Tournament	4–6 June 2021	(Hungary) Debrecen	1	Italy
Total			8	

== Players ==
Team	Players			
France	Ana Maria Filip	Laëtitia Guapo	Marie-Ève Paget	Mamignan Touré
ROC	Evgeniia Frolkina	Olga Frolkina	Yulia Kozik	Anastasia Logunova
China	Wan Jiyuan	Wang Lili	Yang Shuyu	Zhang Zhiting
Romania	Claudia Cuic	Gabriela Mărginean	Ancuţa Stoenescu	Sonia Ursu-Kim
Italy	Chiara Consolini	Rae Lin D'Alie	Marcella Filippi	Giulia Rulli
Japan	Stephanie Mawuli	Risa Nishioka	Mio Shinozaki	Mai Yamamoto
Mongolia	Enkhtaivany Chimeddolgor	Onolbaataryn Khulan	Bayasgalangiin Solongo	Mönkhsaikhany Tserenlkham
United States	Stefanie Dolson	Allisha Gray	Kelsey Plum	Jackie Young

Katie Lou Samuelson originally qualified as the fourth team member of the United States, but she tested positive for COVID-19 and was replaced by Jackie Young.

== Referees ==
The following 12 referees were selected for the tournament.

- (Australia) Vanessa Devlin
- (China) Shi Qirong
- (Chinese Taipei) Su Yu-yen
- (Egypt) Sara El-Sharnouby
- (Hong Kong) Edmond Ho
- (Hungary) Cecília Tóth
- (Poland) Marek Maliszewski
- (Romania) Vlad Ghizdareanu
- (Russia) Evgeny Ostrovskiy
- (Serbia) Jasmina Juras
- (Switzerland) Markos Michaelides
- (United States) Glenn Tuitt

== Pool ==
=== Standings ===
Pos	Team	Pld	W	L	PF	PA	PD	Qualification
1	United States	7	6	1	136	98	+38	Semifinals
2	ROC	7	5 (Note: ROC 2–0, China 1–1, Japan 0–2)	2	129	90	+39	Semifinals
3	China	7	5	2	127	97	+30	Quarterfinals
4	Japan (H)	7	5	2	130	97	+33	Quarterfinals
5	France	7	4	3	118	116	+2	Quarterfinals
6	Italy	7	2	5	98	125	−27	Quarterfinals
7	Romania	7	1	6	89	142	−53	
8	Mongolia	7	0	7	79	141	−62	

Source: TOCOG and FIBA
Rules for classification: 1) Wins; 2) Head-to-head record; 3) Points scored.
(H) Hosts
Notes:

All times are local (UTC+9).

=== Results ===
24 July 2021
10:15
v

Report

ROC	21–18	Japan
Pts: O. Frolkina 7		Pts: Shinozaki 8

Aomi Urban Sports Park, Tokyo
Referees: Edmond Ho (HKG), Cecília Tóth (HUN)

24 July 2021
10:40
v

Report

China	21–10	Romania
Pts: Wan J, Yang 6		Pts: Cuic 4

Aomi Urban Sports Park, Tokyo
Referees: Marek Maliszewski (POL), Vanessa Devlin (AUS)

24 July 2021
14:00
v

Report

ROC	19–9	China
Pts: O. Frolkina 7		Pts: Wan J 4

Aomi Urban Sports Park, Tokyo
Referees: Vanessa Devlin (AUS), Cecília Tóth (HUN)

24 July 2021
14:25
v

Report

Romania	8–20	Japan
Pts: Ursu-Kim 3		Pts: Mawuli 9

Aomi Urban Sports Park, Tokyo
Referees: Sara El-Sharnouby (EGY), Markos Michaelides (SUI)

24 July 2021
17:30
v

Report

Italy	15–14	Mongolia
Pts: D'Alie 8		Pts: Solongo 7

Aomi Urban Sports Park, Tokyo
Referees: Shi Qirong (CHN), Vlad Ghizdareanu (ROU)

24 July 2021
17:55
v

Report

United States	17–10	France
Pts: Dolson 7		Pts: Paget, Touré 3

Aomi Urban Sports Park, Tokyo
Referees: Jasmina Juras (SRB), Edmond Ho (HKG)

24 July 2021
21:00
v

Report

Mongolia	9–21	United States
Pts: Chimeddolgor 6		Pts: Gray 9

Aomi Urban Sports Park, Tokyo
Referees: Su Yu-yen (TPE), Vlad Ghizdareanu (ROU)

24 July 2021
21:25
v

Report

France	19–16	Italy
Pts: Filip, Guapo 6		Pts: D'Alie 8

Aomi Urban Sports Park, Tokyo
Referees: Shi Qirong (CHN), Jasmina Juras (SRB)

25 July 2021
10:15
v

Report

Japan	19–10	Mongolia
Pts: Mawuli, Yamamoto 6		Pts: Chimeddolgor, Solongo 3

Aomi Urban Sports Park, Tokyo
Referees: Shi Qirong (CHN), Markos Michaelides (SUI)

25 July 2021
10:40
v

Report

Romania	14–22	Italy
Pts: Mărginean 6		Pts: D'Alie 13

Aomi Urban Sports Park, Tokyo
Referees: Su Yu-yen (TPE), Evgeny Ostrovskiy (RUS)

25 July 2021
14:00
v

Report

Mongolia	5–21	ROC
Pts: Tserenlkham 3		Pts: Kozik, O. Frolkina 8

Aomi Urban Sports Park, Tokyo
Referees: Su Yu-yen (TPE), Vlad Ghizdareanu (ROU)

25 July 2021
14:25
v

Report

China	22–13	Italy
Pts: Zhang 8		Pts: D'Alie 6

Aomi Urban Sports Park, Tokyo
Referees: Cecília Tóth (HUN), Evgeny Ostrovskiy (RUS)

25 July 2021
17:30
v

Report

Romania	11–22	United States
Pts: Cuic 7		Pts: Plum 12

Aomi Urban Sports Park, Tokyo
Referees: Sara El-Sharnouby (EGY), Marek Maliszewski (POL)

25 July 2021
17:55
v

Report

Japan	19–15	France
Pts: three players 5		Pts: Paget 6

Aomi Urban Sports Park, Tokyo
Referees: Evgeny Ostrovskiy (RUS), Vanessa Devlin (AUS)

25 July 2021
21:00
v

Report

China	20–13	France
Pts: Wang L., Yang 7		Pts: Touré 5

Aomi Urban Sports Park, Tokyo
Referees: Glenn Tuitt (USA), Evgeny Ostrovskiy (RUS)

25 July 2021
21:25
v

Report

ROC	16–20	United States
Pts: Kozik 8		Pts: Gray 8

Aomi Urban Sports Park, Tokyo
Referees: Jasmina Juras (SRB), Edmond Ho (HKG)

26 July 2021
10:15
v

Report

Japan	12–15	China
Pts: Mawuli 5		Pts: Wang L. 5

Aomi Urban Sports Park, Tokyo
Referees: Marek Maliszewski (POL), Vanessa Devlin (AUS)

26 July 2021
10:40
v

Report

Mongolia	14–22	Romania
Pts: Tserenlkham 6		Pts: Ursu-Kim, Mărginean 7

Aomi Urban Sports Park, Tokyo
Referees: Su Yu-yen (TPE), Edmond Ho (HKG)

26 July 2021
14:00
v

Report

Romania	12–21	ROC
Pts: three players 4		Pts: O. Frolkina, Logunova 8

Aomi Urban Sports Park, Tokyo
Referees: Vanessa Devlin (AUS), Glenn Tuitt (USA)

26 July 2021
14:25
v

Report

Italy	10–22	Japan
Pts: Consolini 4		Pts: Mawuli 8

Aomi Urban Sports Park, Tokyo
Referees: Cecília Tóth (HUN), Su Yu-yen (TPE)

26 July 2021
17:30
v

Report

France	22–18	Mongolia
Pts: Guapo 9		Pts: Khulan, Tserenlkham 7

Aomi Urban Sports Park, Tokyo
Referees: Evgeny Ostrovskiy (RUS), Sara El-Sharnouby (EGY)

26 July 2021
17:55
v

Report

Italy	13–17	United States
Pts: D'Alie, Rulli 4		Pts: Dolson, Gray 6

Aomi Urban Sports Park, Tokyo
Referees: Shi Qirong (CHN), Vlad Ghizdareanu (ROU)

26 July 2021
21:00
v

Report

United States	21–19	China
Pts: Plum 10		Pts: Yang 8

Aomi Urban Sports Park, Tokyo
Referees: Sara El-Sharnouby (EGY), Markos Michaelides (SUI)

26 July 2021
21:25
v

Report

France	17–14	ROC
Pts: Touré 10		Pts: three players 4

Aomi Urban Sports Park, Tokyo
Referees: Jasmina Juras (SRB), Shi Qirong (CHN)

27 July 2021
13:30
v

Report

United States	18–20	Japan
Pts: Dolson 7		Pts: Yamamoto 8

Aomi Urban Sports Park, Tokyo
Referees: Evgeny Ostrovskiy (RUS), Shi Qirong (CHN)

27 July 2021
13:55
v

Report

China	21–9	Mongolia
Pts: Wan 10		Pts: Chimeddolgor 5

Aomi Urban Sports Park, Tokyo
Referees: Cecília Tóth (HUN), Sara El-Sharnouby (EGY)

27 July 2021
17:00
v

Report

France	22–12	Romania
Pts: Touré 11		Pts: Ursu-Kim, Stoenescu 4

Aomi Urban Sports Park, Tokyo
Referees: Glenn Tuitt (USA), Su Yu-yen (TPE)

27 July 2021
17:25
v

Report

ROC	17–9	Italy
Pts: O. Frolkina 6		Pts: Rulli 5

Aomi Urban Sports Park, Tokyo
Referees: Marek Maliszewski (POL), Vanessa Devlin (AUS)

== Knockout stage ==
=== Bracket ===
Quarterfinals
27 July
Japan	14
France	16
27 July
China	19
Italy	13

Semifinals
28 July
United States	18
France	16
28 July
ROC	21
China	14

Gold medal
28 July
United States	18
ROC	15
Bronze medal
28 July
France	14
China	16

=== Quarterfinals ===
27 July 2021
20:30
v

Report

China	19–13	Italy
Pts: Wang 11		Pts: Consolini, D'Alie 5

Aomi Urban Sports Park, Tokyo
Referees: Vanessa Devlin (AUS), Vlad Ghizdareanu (ROU)

27 July 2021
21:50
v

Report

Japan	14–16	France
Pts: Shinozaki 7		Pts: Paget 5

Aomi Urban Sports Park, Tokyo
Referees: Evgeny Ostrovskiy (RUS), Cecília Tóth (HUN)

=== Semifinals ===
28 July 2021
17:00
v

Report

United States	18–16	France
Pts: Gray, Plum 6		Pts: Filip 8

Aomi Urban Sports Park, Tokyo
Referees: Jasmina Juras (SRB), Vlad Ghizdareanu (ROU)

28 July 2021
18:10
v

Report

ROC	21–14	China
Pts: Kozik 10		Pts: Zhang 7

Aomi Urban Sports Park, Tokyo
Referees: Cecília Tóth (HUN), Marek Maliszewski (POL)

=== Bronze medal game ===
28 July 2021
20:45
v

Report

France	14–16	China
Pts: Touré 8		Pts: Wang 9

Aomi Urban Sports Park, Tokyo
Referees: Evgeny Ostrovskiy (RUS), Jasmina Juras (SRB)

=== Gold medal game ===
28 July 2021
21:55
v

Report

United States	18–15	ROC
Pts: Dolson 7		Pts: Logunova 6

Aomi Urban Sports Park, Tokyo
Referees: Edmond Ho (HKG), Cecília Tóth (HUN)

== Final ranking ==
Rank	Team	Pld	W	L
Gold medal	United States	9	8	1
Silver medal	ROC	9	6	3
Bronze medal	China	10	7	3
4	France	10	5	5
5	Japan	8	5	3
6	Italy	8	2	6
7	Romania	7	1	6
8	Mongolia	7	0	7

== Points leaders ==
Rank	Name	Points
1	(United States) Kelsey Plum	55
1	(China) Wang Lili	55
3	Olga Frolkina	54
3	(France) Mamignan Touré	54
5	Yulia Kozik	53
