= 2021 FIBA 3x3 Women's Olympic Qualifying Tournament =

3x3 basketball competition

The 2021 Women's FIBA Olympic Qualifying Tournament was initially scheduled to be held in Bangalore, India from 18 to 22 March 2020. However, due to the COVID-19 pandemic, the tournament was moved to Graz, Austria and was held from 26 to 30 May 2021. The games were accommodated a temporary makeshift 2,000-seat capacity at the Hauptplatz.

== Qualified teams ==
Teams already qualified for the Olympics were excluded. The hosts of the OQT, the top three teams from the World Cup, and 16 teams from the rankings (including Japan, if not already qualified) competed for three Olympic qualifying places.

Means of qualification	Date	Venue	Berth(s)	Qualifier(s)
OQT hosts	—	—	1	Austria
2019 FIBA 3x3 World Cup	23 June 2019	(Netherlands) Amsterdam	2	Hungary; France
FIBA 3x3 World Ranking	1 November 2019	(Japan) Utsunomiya	17	United States; Germany; Uruguay; Indonesia; Iran; Japan; Thailand; Australia; Netherlands; Estonia; Belarus; Sri Lanka; Italy; Chinese Taipei; Spain; Switzerland; Ukraine
Total			20	

== Players ==
Seed	Team	Players			
1	France	Laetitia Guapo	Migna Touré	Marie-Ève Paget	Soana Lucet
2	Iran	Delaram Vakili	Negin Rasoulipour	Shadi Abdolvand	Masoumeh Esmaeilzadeh
3	Netherlands	Loyce Bettonvil	Jill Bettonvil	Ilse Kuijt	Noortje Driessen
4	Italy	Rae Lin D'Alie	Marcella Filippi	Chiara Consolini	Sara Madera
5	Chinese Taipei	Liu Hsi-yeh	Wei Yu-chun	Lin Hsien-fang	
6	Japan	Risa Nishioka	Mio Shinozaki	Mai Yamamoto	Stephanie Mawuli
7	Estonia	Anna Gret Asi	Kadri-Ann Lass	Jane Svilberg	Merike Anderson
8	United States	Kelsey Plum	Allisha Gray	Katie Lou Samuelson	Stefanie Dolson
9	Germany	Svenja Brunckhorst	Stefanie Grigoleit	Satou Sabally	Theresa Simon
10	Ukraine	Krystyna Filevych	Nataliia Tsiubyk	Ganna Rulyova	Anna Olkhovyk
11	Belarus	Anastasiya Sushchyk	Natallia Dashkevich	Darya Mahalias	Maryna Ivashchanka
12	Switzerland	Marielle Giroud	Sarah Kershaw	Nancy Fora	Evita Herminjard
13	Spain	Aitana Cuevas	Vega Gimeno	Sandra Ygueravide	Marta Canella
14	Hungary	Cyesha Goree	Klaudia Papp	Alexandra Theodoreán	Dóra Medgyessy
15	Uruguay	Aldana Gayoso	Sabina Bello	Victoria Pereyra	Florencia Somma
16	Indonesia	Ayu Sriartha	Dyah Lestari	Lea Kahol	Nathania Orville
17	Australia	Bec Cole	Alice Kunek	Madeleine Garrick	Keely Froling
18	Sri Lanka	Benika Don Thalagala	Solange Gunawijeya	Anjalee Ekanayake	Anne Stephanie Ravindran
19	Thailand	Supavadee Kunchuan	Kanokwan Prajuapsook	Warunee Kitraksa	Rujiwan Bunsinprom
20	Austria	Anja Fuchs-Robetin	Rebekka Kalaydjiev	Camilla Neumann	Sarah Sagerer

== Preliminary round ==
=== Pool A ===
Pos	Team	Pld	W	L	PF	PA	PD	Qualification	United States	France	Germany	Indonesia	Uruguay
1	United States	4	4	0	85	41	+44	Knockout stage			21–12	21–7	
2	France	4	3	1	76	48	+28	Knockout stage	17–21				20–7
3	Germany	4	2	2	67	63	+4			12–21			21–14
4	Indonesia	4	1	3	44	76	−32			6–18	9–21		
5	Uruguay	4	0	4	41	85	−44		5–22			15–22	

Source: FIBA
Rules for classification: 1) Wins; 2) Head-to-head record; 3) Points scored; 4) Higher seed.

=== Pool B ===
Pos	Team	Pld	W	L	PF	PA	PD	Qualification	Japan	Australia	Ukraine	Thailand	Iran
1	Japan	4	4	0	84	42	+42	Knockout stage		21–15	20–17		
2	Australia	4	3	1	74	40	+34	Knockout stage			15–12		22–2
3	Ukraine	4	2	2	67	49	+18					21–7	17–7
4	Thailand	4	1	3	39	84	−45		6–21	5–22			
5	Iran	4	0	4	33	82	−49		4–22			20–21	

Source: FIBA
Rules for classification: 1) Wins; 2) Head-to-head record; 3) Points scored; 4) Higher seed.

=== Pool C ===
Pos	Team	Pld	W	L	PF	PA	PD	Qualification	Hungary	Belarus	Netherlands	Estonia	Sri Lanka
1	Hungary	4	4	0	81	43	+38	Knockout stage				21–10	22–9
2	Belarus	4	2 (Note: Belarus 1–1, 68 PS; Netherlands 1–1, 65 PS, 3 Seed; Estonia 1–1, 65 PS, 7 Seed)	2	68	54	+14	Knockout stage	11–21		14–16		
3	Netherlands	4	2	2	65	54	+11		13–17			14–20	
4	Estonia	4	2	2	65	62	+3			13–21			22–6
5	Sri Lanka	4	0	4	22	88	−66			4–22	3–22		

Source: FIBA
Rules for classification: 1) Wins; 2) Head-to-head record; 3) Points scored; 4) Higher seed.

=== Pool D ===
Pos	Team	Pld	W	L	PF	PA	PD	Qualification	Spain	Switzerland	Austria	Italy	Chinese Taipei for Olympic games
1	Spain	4	3 (Note: Spain 1–1, 78 PS; Switzerland 1–1, 71 PS; Austria 1–1, 69 PS)	1	78	59	+19	Knockout stage			21–13		22–10
2	Switzerland	4	3	1	71	50	+21	Knockout stage	16–14			21–11	
3	Austria (H)	4	3	1	69	66	+3			14–13		21–17	
4	Italy	4	1	3	69	77	−8		20–21				21–14
5	Chinese Taipei	4	0	4	50	85	−35			11–21	15–21		

Source: FIBA
Rules for classification: 1) Wins; 2) Head-to-head record; 3) Points scored; 4) Higher seed.
(H) Hosts

== Knockout stage ==
No final was played. The winners of the semifinals and the third place game winner qualified for the Olympics.

Quarter-finals
30 May
United States	21
Belarus	10
30 May
Spain	14
Australia	12
30 May
Japan	20
Switzerland	13
30 May
Hungary	17
France	18

Semi-finals
30 May
United States	21
Spain	13
30 May
Japan	14
France	15

Third place game
30 May
Spain	18
Japan (OT)	20

== Final standings ==
#	Team	Pld	W	L	PF	PA	PD
1st	United States	6	6	0	127	64	+63
2nd	France	6	5	1	109	79	+30
3rd	Japan	7	6	1	138	88	+40
4th	Spain	7	4	3	123	112	+11
Eliminated at the quarterfinals
5th	Hungary	5	4	1	98	61	+37
6th	Australia	5	3	2	86	54	+32
7th	Switzerland	5	3	2	84	70	+14
8th	Belarus	5	2	3	78	75	+3
Eliminated at the preliminary round
9th	Austria	4	3	1	69	66	+3
10th	Germany	4	2	2	67	63	+4
11th	Ukraine	4	2	2	67	49	+18
12th	Netherlands	4	2	2	65	54	+11
13th	Estonia	4	2	2	65	62	+3
14th	Italy	4	1	3	69	77	−8
15th	Indonesia	4	1	3	44	76	−32
16th	Thailand	4	1	3	39	84	−45
17th	Chinese Taipei	4	0	4	50	85	−35
18th	Uruguay	4	0	4	41	85	−44
19th	Iran	4	0	4	33	82	−49
20th	Sri Lanka	4	0	4	22	88	−66

Qualified for the 2020 Summer Olympics

== See also ==
- 2021 FIBA 3x3 Olympic Qualifying Tournament
