= Mariia Cherepanova =

Russian basketball player

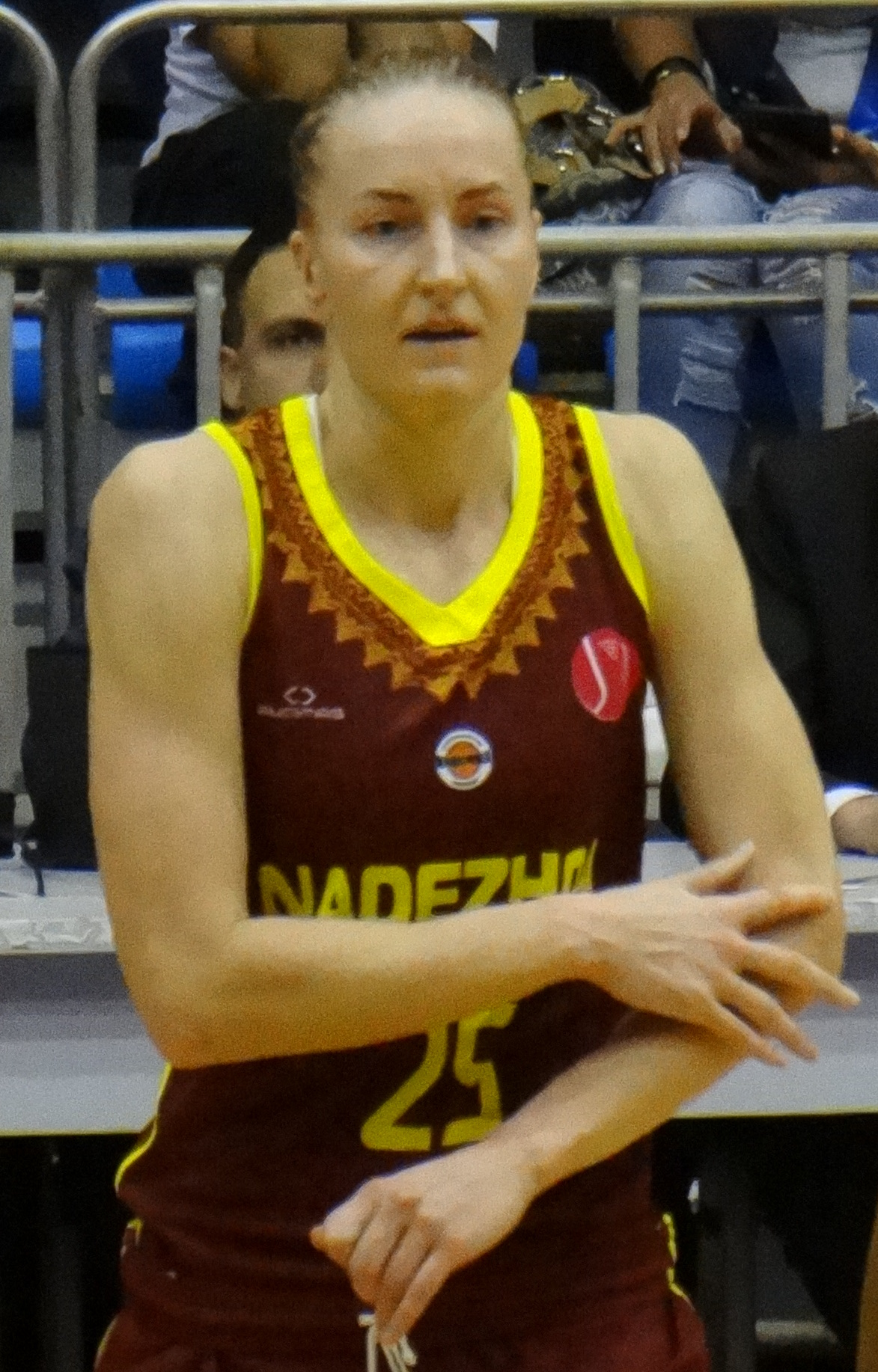
- Cherepanova in 2017

No. 25 – UMMC Ekaterinburg
- Position: Small forward
- League: RPL

Personal information
- Born: August 28, 1987 (age 39) Izhevsk, Russia
- Listed height: 6 ft 3 in (1.91 m)

Mariia Sergeyevna Cherepanova (Russian: Мария Сергеевна Черепанова; born August 28, 1987) is a Russian basketball player for UMMC Ekaterinburg and the Russian national team.

She participated at the 2015 European Games, winning a gold medal, EuroBasket Women 2017. and EuroBasket Women 2021. She qualified for the 2020 Summer Olympics, playing in a team with Olga Frolkina, Yulia Kozik and Anastasia Logunova in the 3×3 tournament.
