= Onolbaataryn Khulan =

Mongolian basketball player

Personal information
- Nationality: Mongolia
- Born: Онолбаатар Хулан; 27 July 1999 (age 27) Mongolia
- Height: 1.80 m (5 ft 11 in)

Sport
- Country: Mongolia
- Sport: Basketball
- Event: 3x3

Achievements and titles
- Olympic finals: 8th(2020)
- World finals: (silver) (2025)
- Regional finals: (bronze) (2024)
Medal record
Women's 3x3 basketball
Representing Mongolia
World Cup
Silver medal – second place	2025 Ulaanbaatar	Team
Asian Cup
Bronze medal – third place	2024 Singapore	Team

Onolbaataryn Khulan (Mongolian: Онолбаатарын Хулан; born 27 July 1999) is a Mongolian basketball player. She competed in the 2020 Summer Olympics.

Olympic Games
Preceded by Battulgyn Temüülen	Flagbearer for Mongolia (with Ölziibayaryn Düürenbayar); Tokyo 2020	Succeeded by Incumbent
