= Krystyna Filevych =

Ukrainian basketball player

Frankivsk-Prykarpattia
- Position: Forward
- League: Ukraine Women's League

Personal information
- Born: 15 June 1991 (age 35) Ivano-Frankivsk Oblast, Ukraine
- Listed height: 182 cm (6 ft 0 in)
- Listed weight: 72 kg (159 lb)

Krystyna Filevych (née Matsko, born 15 June 1991) is a Ukrainian basketball player for Frankivsk-Prykarpattia and the Ukrainian national team. She was named the best forward of the Ukrainian Women's Super League in the season 2020/21 when she played for Kyiv-Basket.

She participated in the EuroBasket Women 2013 as well as in the qualifications for the 2015 tournament.

Matsko became more prominent as a 3x3 basketball player. She is a 2015 European Games silver medallist. After changing her surname to Filevych, she won bronze at the 2017 World Cup and competed at the 2019 World Cup which was not successful for the Ukrainian team. Filevych also competed to qualify the Ukrainian team for the 2020 Summer Olympics but the team did not manage to win a spot at the 2021 Olympic Qualifying Tournament.

Matsko graduated from the Lviv State University of Physical Culture.
