= Mönkhsaikhany Tserenlkham =

Mongolian basketball player

Personal information
- Nationality: Mongolia
- Born: Мөнхсайхан Цэрэнлхам; 13 March 1996 (age 30) Ulaanbaatar, Mongolia
- Height: 1.78 m (5 ft 10 in)

Sport
- Country: Mongolia
- Sport: Basketball
- Event: 3x3

Achievements and titles
- Olympic finals: 8th (2020)
- World finals: (silver) (2025)
- Regional finals: (bronze) (2024)
Medal record
Women's 3x3 basketball
Representing Mongolia
World Cup
Silver medal – second place	2025 Ulaanbaatar	Team
Asian Cup
Bronze medal – third place	2024 Singapore	Team

Mönkhsaikhany Tserenlkham (Mongolian: Мөнхсайханы Цэрэнлхам; born 13 March 1996) is a Mongolian basketball player. She competed in the 2020 Summer Olympics.
