= Yulia Kozik =

Russian basketball player

No. 7 – Dynamo Kursk
- Position: Shooting guard

Personal information
- Born: February 17, 1997 (age 29)
- Listed height: 177 cm (5 ft 10 in)

Career history
- 2013–2017: MBA Moscow
- 2017–2019: Inventa Kursk
- 2019–present: Dynamo Kursk
Medals
Women's 3x3 basketball
Representing (Russia) ROC
Olympic Games
Silver medal – second place	2020 Tokyo	Team
Women's basketball
Representing Russia
Europe U20 Championship
Bronze medal – third place	2016 Matosinhos
Bronze medal – third place	2017 Matosinhos

Yulia Sergeyevina Kozik (Russian: Юлия Сергеевна Козик, IPA: [ˈjʉlʲɪjə ˈkozʲɪk]; born 17 February 1997) is a Russian basketball player for Dynamo Kursk and the Russian national team.

She participated at the 2015 FIBA European U20 championships, 2016 FIBA European U20 championships, 2017 FIBA European U20 championships, winning a bronze medal.

She qualified for the 2020 Summer Olympics, playing in a team with Mariia Cherepanova, Olga Frolkina, and Anastasia Logunova in the 3×3 tournament.
