= Giulia Rulli =

Italian basketball player (born 1991)

Personal information
- Born: 3 June 1991 (age 34); Rome, Italy
- Height: 1.85 m (6 ft 1 in)

Sport
- Country: Italy
- Sport: Basketball

Giulia Rulli (born 3 June 1991) is an Italian basketball player. She competed in the 2020 Summer Olympics.
