= Enkhtaivany Chimeddolgor =

Mongolian basketball player

Personal information
- Nationality: Mongolia
- Born: Энхтайваны Чимэддолгор; 29 January 1993 (age 33) Mongolia
- Height: 1.75 m (5 ft 9 in)

Sport
- Country: Mongolia
- Sport: Basketball

Achievements and titles
- Olympic finals: 8th (2020)
Medal record
Women's 3x3 basketball
Representing Mongolia
Asian Cup
Silver medal – second place	2013 Doha	Women's team

Enkhtaivany Chimeddolgor (Mongolian: Энхтайваны Чимэддолгор; born 29 January 1993) is a Mongolian basketball player. She competed in the 2020 Summer Olympics.
