= Ana Maria Filip =

Romanian-born French basketball player

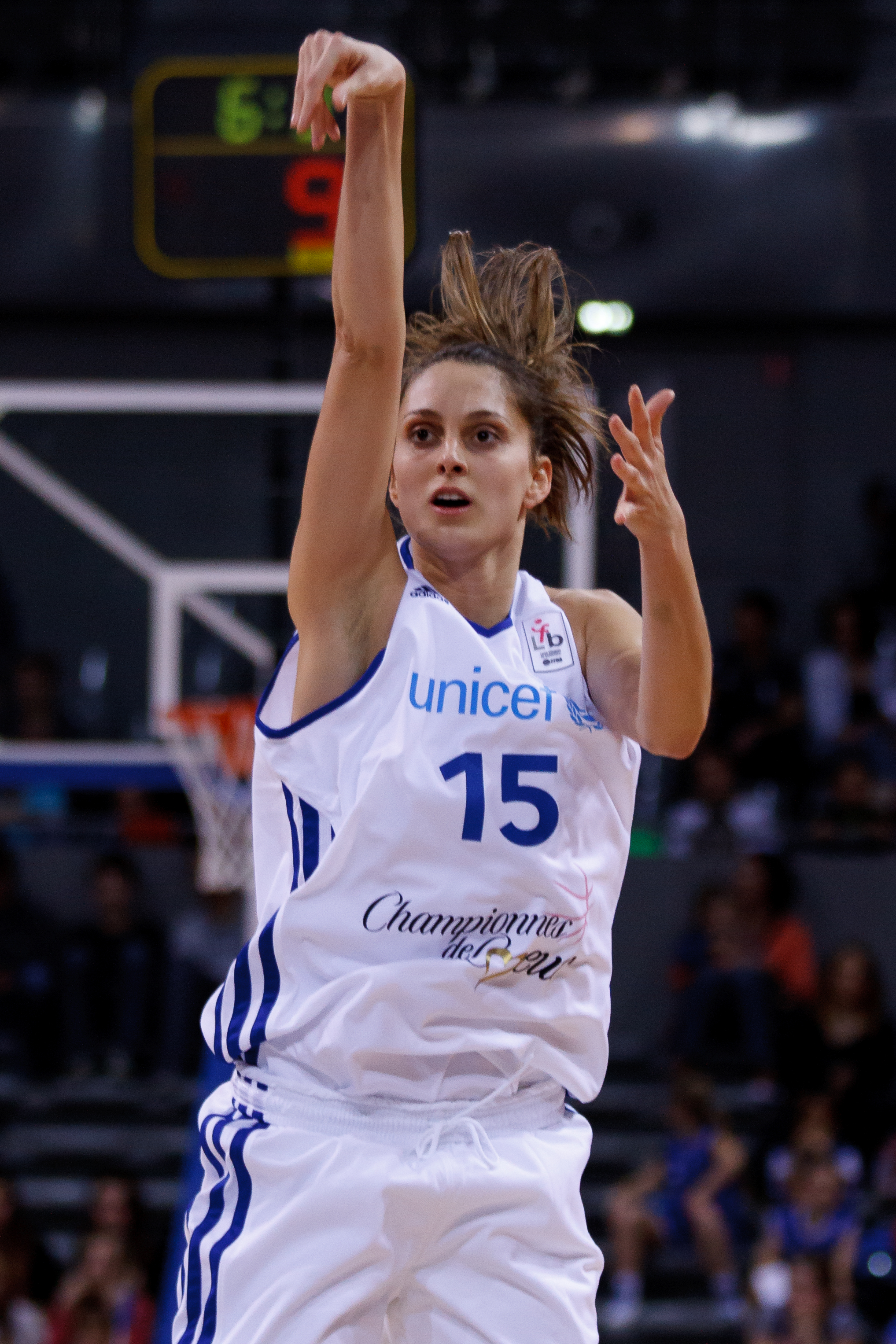
- March 2014

No. 11 – Tango Bourges Basket
- Position: Center
- League: La Boulangère Wonderligue

Personal information
- Born: Ana Maria Căta-Chițiga; 20 June 1989 (age 37) Bucharest, Romania
- Listed height: 6 ft 5 in (1.96 m)

Career information
- Playing career: 2007–present

Career history
- 2007–2009: Bourges
- 2009–2010: Villeneuve-d'Ascq
- 2010–2012: Tarbes
- 2012–2013: Lattes Montpellier
- 2013–2015: Flammes Carolo
- 2015–2017: Bourges
- 2017–2019: Flammes Carolo
- 2019: CCC Polkowice
- 2019–2020: Bourges
- 2020–2022: Lattes Montpellier
- 2023–present: Bourges
Medals
Women's basketball
Representing France
EuroBasket
Silver medal – second place	2015 Hungary/Romania	Team
Women's 3x3 basketball
World Cup
Bronze medal – third place	2019 Amsterdam	Team
Europe Cup
Gold medal – first place	2019 Debrecen

Ana Maria Filip (née Ana Maria Căta-Chițiga; 20 June 1989) is a Romanian-born French professional basketball player who plays as a center for Tango Bourges Basket and the French national team. She participated at the 2014 FIBA World Championship and at the 2015 EuroBasket.

In June 2019, she was selected in the French 3x3 team that finished third in the world championship, and then was European champion. She was named best player of this competition. She qualified for the 2020 Summer Olympics.

== Achievements ==
- LFB:
  - Winner: 2008, 2009
- Coupe de France:
  - Winner: 2008, 2009, 2013
- Tournoi de la Fédération:
  - Winner: 2008

== Personal life ==
She's the daughter of two former Romanian international players, Camelia Filip (basketball) and Marius Căta-Chițiga (volleyball).
