= Evgeniia Frolkina =

Russian basketball player

No. 16 – Dynamo Kursk
- Position: Small forward

Personal information
- Born: 28 July 1997 (age 29)
- Listed height: 183 cm (6 ft 0 in)
- Listed weight: 77 kg (170 lb)

Career history
- 2017–2019: Inventa Kursk
- 2019–present: Dynamo Kursk
Medals
Women's 3x3 basketball
Representing (Russia) ROC
Olympic Games
Silver medal – second place	2020 Tokyo	Team
Women's basketball
Representing Russia
Europe U20 Championship
Bronze medal – third place	2017 Matosinhos

Evgeniia Eduardovna Frolkina (Russian: Евгения Эдуардовна Фролкина, IPA: [jɪvˈɡʲenʲɪjə ˈfrolkʲɪnə]; born 28 July 1997) is a Russian basketball player. She competed in the 2020 Summer Olympics. Her twin sister Olga is also a professional basketball player.
