= Chiara Consolini =

Italian basketball player (born 1988)

Personal information
- Born: 20 May 1988 (age 37) Peschiera del Garda, Italy
- Height: 1.82 m (6 ft 0 in)

Sport
- Country: Italy
- Sport: Basketball

Chiara Consolini (born 20 May 1988) is an Italian basketball player. She competed in the 2020 Summer Olympics.
