= Ancuța Stoenescu =

Romanian basketball player

Personal information
- Full name: Ancuța Violeta Stoenescu
- Nationality: Romania
- Born: 1 January 1980 (age 46) Timișoara, Romania
- Height: 1.74 m (5 ft 9 in)

Sport
- Sport: Basketball

Ancuța Violeta "Anca" Stoenescu (born 1 January 1980) is a Romanian basketball player. She competed in the 2020 Summer Olympics.
