= Anastasia Logunova =

Russian basketball player (born 1990)

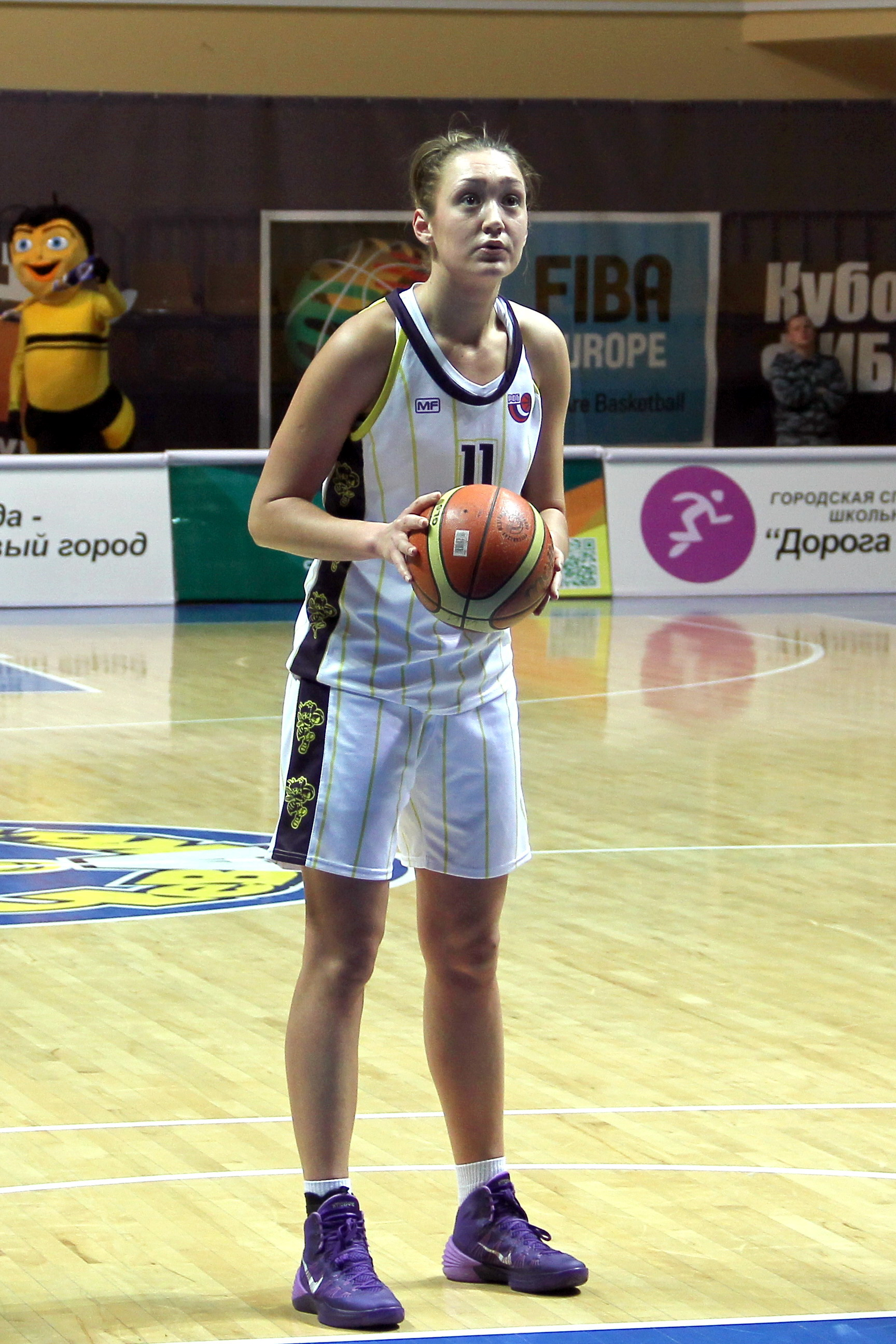
- Logunova in 2014

No. 11 – Nadezhda Orenburg
- Position: Power forward

Personal information
- Born: 20 July 1990 (age 36) Moscow, Russia
- Listed height: 192 cm (6 ft 4 in)
- Listed weight: 181 lb (82 kg)

Career history
- 2007–2008: WBC Moscow
- 2008–2010: Dynamo Moscow
- 2011: Nadezhda Orenburg
- 2012–2015: Chevakata Vologda
- 2015–2016: Castors Braine
- 2016–2019: Dynamo Kursk
- 2019–2020: MBA Moscow
- 2020–present: Nadezhda Orenburg

Career highlights
- EuroLeague champion (2017)
Medals
Women's 3x3 basketball
Representing (Russia) ROC
Olympic Games
Silver medal – second place	2020 Tokyo	Team
Representing Russia
World Cup
Gold medal – first place	2017 Nantes	Team
Silver medal – second place	2014 Moscow	Team
Silver medal – second place	2018 Bocaue	Team
Europe Cup
Gold medal – first place	2014 Bucharest	Team
Gold medal – first place	2017 Amsterdam	Team
Bronze medal – third place	2016 Bucharest	Team
Women's basketball
Representing Russia
Summer Universiade
Silver medal – second place	2013 Kazan	Team

Anastasia Yuryevna Logunova (Russian: Анастасия Юрьевна Логунова, IPA: [ɐnəstɐˈsʲijə ləɡʊˈnovə]; born 20 July 1990) is a Russian basketball player. She qualified for the 2020 Summer Olympics, playing in a team with Mariia Cherepanova, Olga Frolkina, and Yulia Kozik in the 3×3 tournament. With Dynamo Kursk she won the 2017 EuroLeague. She has also played for the Russia women's national 3x3 team, who notably won the inaugural 2014 FIBA Europe 3x3 Championships.
