= Marcella Filippi =

Italian basketball player (born 1985)

Personal information
- Nationality: Italy
- Born: 27 September 1985 (age 40) Bergamo, Italy
- Height: 1.86 m (6 ft 1 in)

Sport
- Sport: Basketball

Marcella Filippi (born 27 September 1985) is an Italian basketball player. She competed in the 2020 Summer Olympics.
