= Bayasgalangiin Solongo =

Mongolian basketball player

Personal information
- Nationality: Mongolia
- Born: 6 February 1990 (age 36) Ulaanbaatar, Mongolia
- Height: 1.82 m (6 ft 0 in)

Sport
- Sport: Basketball

Bayasgalangiin Solongo (Mongolian: Баясгалангийн Солонго; born 6 February 1990) is a Mongolian basketball player. She competed in the 2020 Summer Olympics.
