= Allisha Gray =

American basketball player (born 1995)

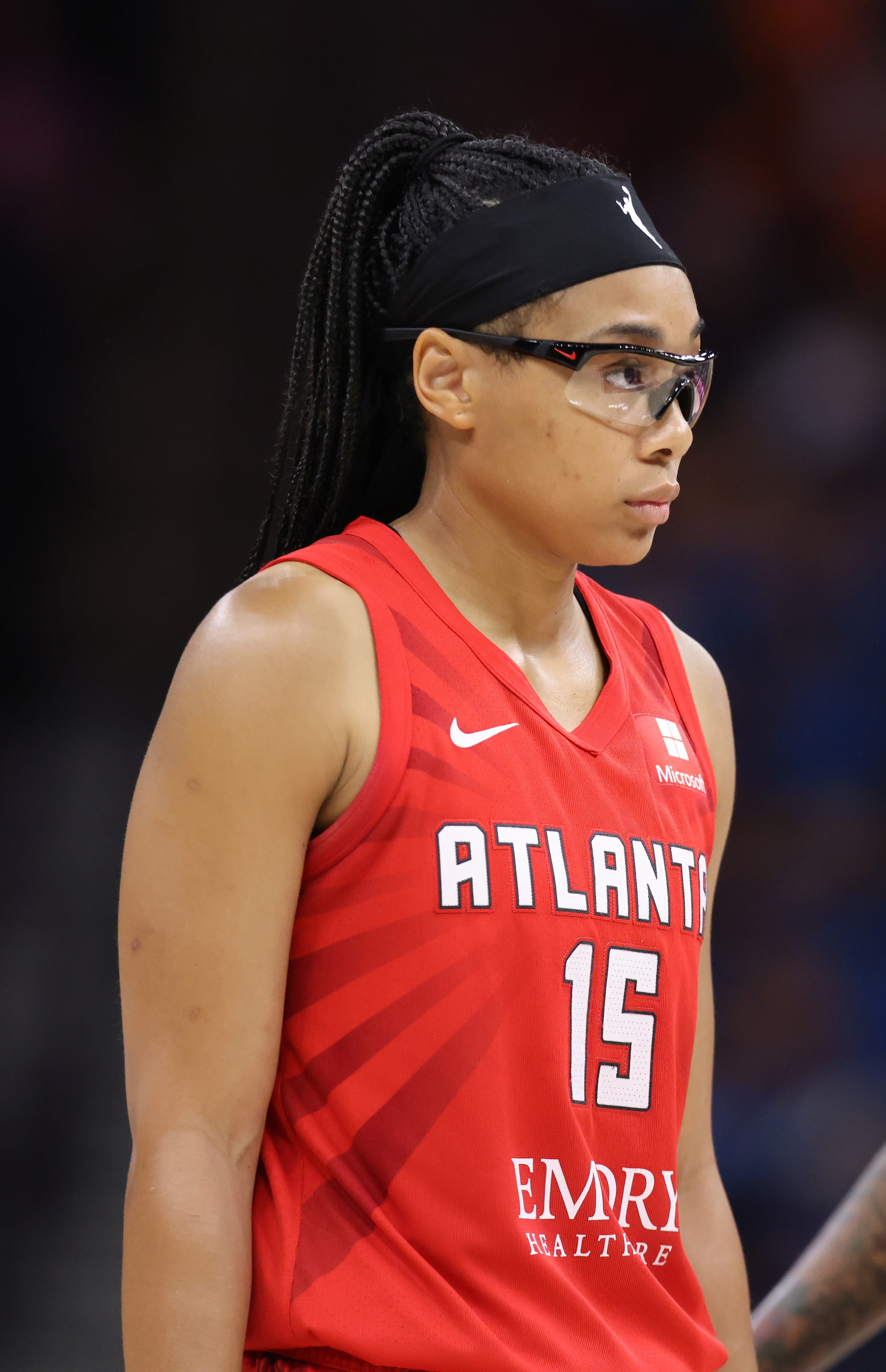
- Gray with the Atlanta Dream in 2024

No. 15 – Atlanta Dream
- Position: Shooting guard
- League: WNBA

Personal information
- Born: January 12, 1995 (age 31) Greenwood, South Carolina, U.S.
- Listed height: 6 ft 0 in (1.83 m)
- Listed weight: 167 lb (76 kg)

Career information
- High school: Washington County (Sandersville, Georgia)
- College: North Carolina (2013–2015); South Carolina (2016–2017)
- WNBA draft: 2017: 1st round, 4th overall pick
- Drafted by: Dallas Wings
- Playing career: 2017–present

Career history
- 2017–2022: Dallas Wings
- 2018–2019: Elitzur Ramla
- 2023–present: Atlanta Dream
- 2025: Lunar Owls
- 2026–present: Mist

Career highlights
- 4× WNBA All-Star (2023–2026); All-WNBA First Team (2025); WNBA Three-Point Shootout champion (2024); WNBA Skills Challenge Champion (2024); Unrivaled champion (2026); Unrivaled Second Team (2026); Athletes Unlimited Champion (2024); USA Basketball 3x3 Athlete of the Year (2020); WNBA Rookie of the Year (2017); NCAA champion (2017); First-team All-ACC (2015); ACC All-Freshman Team (2014); Gatorade Georgia Player of the Year (2012)
- Stats at WNBA.com
- Stats at Basketball Reference
Medals
Women's 3x3 basketball
Representing United States
Olympic Games
Gold medal – first place	2020 Tokyo	Team
FIBA 3x3 AmeriCup
Gold medal – first place	2025 León

Allisha Gray (/ˈæliːʃə/ AL-lee-shə; born January 12, 1995) is an American professional basketball player for the Atlanta Dream of the Women's National Basketball Association (WNBA) and for Vinyl of Unrivaled. She won a gold medal in women's 3x3 basketball at the 2020 Summer Olympics.

She played college basketball for the North Carolina Tar Heels and South Carolina Gamecocks. After she was selected 4th overall by the Dallas Wings in the 2017 WNBA draft, Gray won the WNBA Rookie of the Year award.

== Early life ==
She was a member of the U18 USA Basketball National Team as well as the 3-on-3 National Team. Named 3A state player of the year three times. She led Washington County to a three-year record of 88–4 that included a perfect 32–0 record and a 3A state championship in 2010–11. As a junior, Gray averaged 32.0 points and 8.5 rebounds en route to a state runner-up finish. She then missed most of her senior season with a knee injury

== College career ==
Heavily recruited by power programs, she was ranked the 7th overall player as part of a high-profile 2013 recruiting class. After receiving offers from Maryland, Kentucky, South Carolina, etc., she eventually chose to attend North Carolina to play for Coach Sylvia Hatchell. After two years in Chapel Hill, Gray shockingly announced that she would be transferring. It was then reported that her reason for transferring was due to UNC's athletic-academic scandal. In May 2015, it was announced that Gray had transferred to South Carolina to play for Dawn Staley. Gray won a National Championship with the 2017 Gamecocks in her final college season.

== Professional career ==
=== WNBA ===
After helping lead South Carolina to the NCAA Championship, Gray opted to enter the 2017 WNBA draft. By entering, she would forgo her final season of college eligibility. She was drafted 4th overall by the Dallas Wings placing her in the city where she won a national title two weeks prior, and eventually pairing her with South Carolina teammate, Kaela Davis, who was selected 10th. In her rookie season, Gray immediately entered the Wings' starting lineup at the shooting guard. She started in all 34 games and averaged 13.1 ppg. On August 12, 2017, Gray scored a career-high 21 points in a 96–88 loss to the Connecticut Sun. The Wings finished as the number 7 seed in the league with a 16–18 record. The Wings were defeated in the first round elimination game 86–76 by the Washington Mystics. On September 19, 2017, it was announced by the WNBA that Gray won the 2017 Rookie of the Year Award.

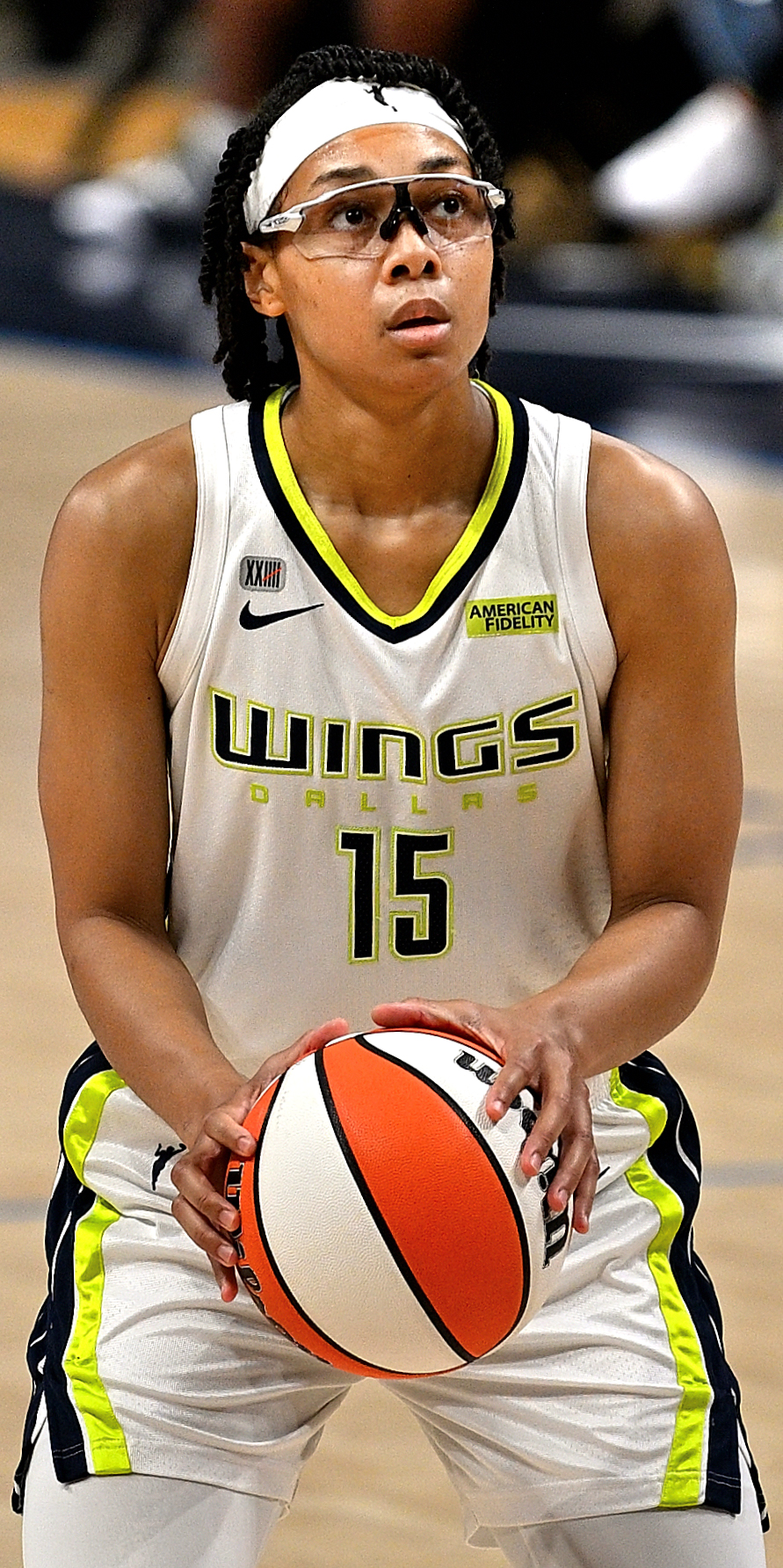
Gray with the Dallas Wings in 2021

In her second season, Gray continued her starting role with the Wings. With the arrival of all-star center Liz Cambage, Gray would have a reduced offensive load on the team. Gray averaged 9.2 ppg in her second season, helping the Wings to the number 8 seed with a 15–19 record. In the first round elimination game, the Wings lost 101–83 to the Phoenix Mercury.

In January 2023, Gray was traded to the Atlanta Dream in exchange for draft picks.On June 15, 2025, she had a career high 32 points in the blowout win vs the Washington Mystics.

=== Overseas ===
In June 2018, Gray signed with Elitzur Ramla of the Israeli League for the 2018-19 off-season.

=== Unrivaled ===
On August 22, 2024, it was announced that Gray would appear and play in the inaugural season of Unrivaled, a new women's 3-on-3 basketball league founded by Napheesa Collier and Breanna Stewart. She played for Lunar Owls in the 2025 season.

On November 5th, 2025, Gray was drafted by Mist BC for the 2026 Unrivaled season. The Mist went on to win the second Unrivaled Championship versus the Phantom in March of 2026 in Miami, Florida.

== Career statistics ==
Legend
GP	Games played	GS	Games started	MPG	Minutes per game	RPG	Rebounds per game
APG	Assists per game	SPG	Steals per game	BPG	Blocks per game	PPG	Points per game
TO	Turnovers per game	FG%	Field-goal percentage	3P%	3-point field-goal percentage	FT%	Free-throw percentage
**Bold**	Career best	°	League leader

*	Denotes season(s) in which Gray won an NCAA Championship

=== WNBA ===
==== Regular season ====
WNBA regular season statistics
Year	Team	GP	GS	MPG	FG%	3P%	FT%	RPG	APG	SPG	BPG	TO	PPG
2017	Dallas	34	34	27.2	.381	.299	.803	3.9	1.3	**1.5**	.6	2.1	13.0
2018	Dallas	34	34	26.7	.403	.270	**.863**	3.4	2.4	1.3	.2	1.4	9.2
2019	Dallas	34	29	30.4	.457	.384	.848	4.1	2.3	1.2	.4	1.4	10.6
2020	Dallas	20	14	26.2	.464	.352	.831	4.2	1.3	1.1	.3	**1.1**	13.1
2021	Dallas	25	16	27.8	.438	.366	.862	5.2	1.7	1.0	**.8**	1.4	11.9
2022	Dallas	33	33	32.9	.423	**.408**	.798	4.8	2.5	1.1	.7	1.3	13.3
2023	Atlanta	38	38	32.7	**.465**	.356	.824	4.9	3.1	1.1	.4	1.9	17.1
2024	Atlanta	40	40	33.3	.403	.342	.769	4.4	2.7	1.1	.7	1.7	15.6
2025	Atlanta	42	42	**34.5**	.451	.384	.799	**5.6**	**3.5**	1.1	.4	1.8	18.4
2026	Atlanta	**44**°	**44**°	32.6	.462	.338	.810	3.5	2.7	1.4	.4	1.5	**19.0**
**Career**	10 years, 2 teams	344	324	30.9	.435	.352	.813	4.4	2.5	1.2	.5	1.5	14.5
**Career**	All-Star	4	1	19.5	.432	.400	.929	1.8	2.0	1.5	.0	.5	15.8

==== Playoffs ====
WNBA playoff statistics
Year	Team	GP	GS	MPG	FG%	3P%	FT%	RPG	APG	SPG	BPG	TO	PPG
2017	Dallas	1	1	16.1	.000	.000	.750	3.0	.0	1.0	.0	1.0	3.0
2018	Dallas	1	1	**37.0**	.000	.000	**1.000**	4.0	1.0	1.0	.0	**.0**	3.0
2021	Dallas	1	1	34.0	**.600**	**1.000**	**1.000**	6.0	2.0	1.0	**1.0**	1.0	9.0
2022	Dallas	**3**	**3**	35.7	.484	.231	.600	3.7	**4.7**	**1.7**	.3	.7	13.0
2023	Atlanta	2	2	36.0	.424	.385	.700	7.0	4.0	1.5	.5	3.5°	**20.0**
2024	Atlanta	2	2	33.5	.520	.455	.800	4.0	2.0	.0	.5	2.5	17.5
2025	Atlanta	**3**	**3**	33.0	.383	.250	.900	**8.3**	2.3	1.0	.7	1.3	16.0
**Career**	7 years, 2 teams	13	13	33.2	.404	.298	.773	5.5	2.8	1.1	.5	1.5	13.6

=== College ===
NCAA statistics
Year	Team	GP	Points	FG%	3P%	FT%	RPG	APG	SPG	BPG	PPG
2013–14	North Carolina	36	501	.481	**.418**	**.736**	5.5	1.3	**1.4**	.4	13.9
2014–15	North Carolina	35	**552**	.452	.309	.707	**7.6**	2.2	1.3	.6	**15.8**
2015–16	South Carolina	Did not play due to injury									
2016–17*	South Carolina	**37**	487	**.510**	.316	.735	5.0	**2.5**	1.3	**.6**	13.2
**Career**		108	1540	.479	.348	.723	6.0	2.0	1.4	.6	14.3
