= Sonia Ursu-Kim =

Romanian–South Korean basketball player

No. 24 – Busan BNK SUM
- Position: Shooting guard
- League: Women's Korean Basketball League

Personal information
- Born: 24 July 1993 (age 33) Suceava, Romania
- Listed height: 5 ft 9 in (1.75 m)

Career history
- CSU Alba Iulia (2015-16)
- Olimpia București (2014-15)
- Chuncheon Woori Bank Hansae (2012-14)
- Asan Woori Bank WooriWon (2018-22)
- Incheon Shinhan Bank S-birds (2022-24)
- Busan BNK SUM (2024-)

Sonia Ursu-Kim (Korean: 김소니아; born 24 July 1993 in Suceava, Romania) is a Romanian–South Korean professional basketball player. She plays as a shooting guard for the Romanian women's national basketball team and for Ślęza Wrocław in the Basket Liga Kobiet, in Poland.

== Early years ==
Ursu was born to a South Korean engineer father who was working at a shipyard in Romania and to a Romanian mother. She spent the first years of her life in South Korea before returning to Romania when she started school in Suceava. In fourth grade, she moved to the capital Bucharest, where her mother opened a Korean restaurant. During this epoch, Ursu took piano lessons and practiced swimming. Later, she became interested in fashion and basketball. She can also speak fluently Korean.

== Basketball career ==
=== Domestic ===
Despite getting several offers from college basketball teams in the United States, she decided to try her luck in South Korea. In October 2012, Ursu signed with Chuncheon Woori Bank Hansae in the WKBL. From 2014 to 2016, she played in the Romania-Liga Națională for both Olimpia CSU Brașov and CSU Alba Iulia. She signed for CEZ Nymburk ahead of the 2016–17 season. The following season she joined Ślęza Wrocław in Poland.

=== International ===
Ursu represents Romania internationally. She was part of the team that won the 2010 U18 European Division B Championship and played for the U20 at the 2013 U20 Division B Championship. She played in EuroBasket Women 2015, which Romania co-hosted. She played in all four of the team's group games, yet Romania failed to qualify from the group stage. She participated at the 2020 Summer Olympics.

== Achievements ==
- Women's Korean Basketball League:
  - Winner: 2013
- Women's Korean Basketball Cup:
  - Winner: 2013
- Women's Asian Basketball Cup:
  - Winner: 2013
