= Wan Jiyuan =

Chinese basketball player

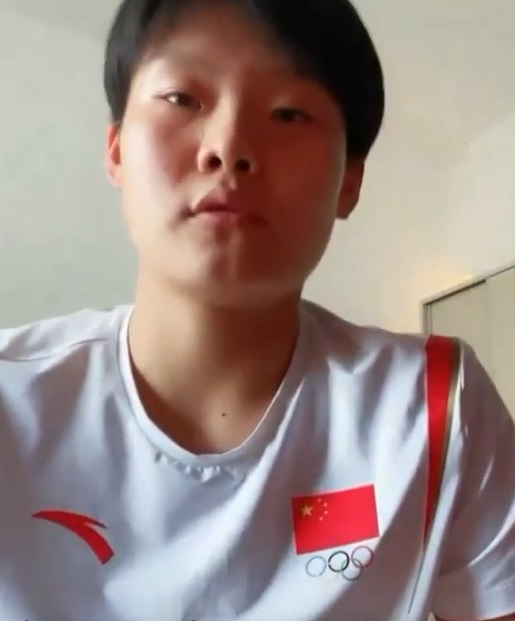

No. 0 – Zhejiang Chouzhou Bank
- Position: Center
- League: WCBA

Personal information
- Born: 13 July 2002 (age 24)
- Listed height: 1.87 m (6 ft 2 in)
- Listed weight: 88 kg (194 lb)

Career information
- Playing career: 2018–present

Career history
- 2018–present: Zhejiang Chouzhou Bank
Medals
Women's 3x3 basketball
Representing China
Olympic Games
Bronze medal – third place	2020 Tokyo	Team
FIBA World Cup
Bronze medal – third place	2022 Antwerp	Team
Asian Games
Gold medal – first place	2022 Hangzhou	Team

Wan Jiyuan (Chinese: 万济圆; pinyin: Wàn Jìyuán; born 13 July 2002) is a Chinese basketball player. She competed in the 2020 Summer Olympics.
