= Olga Frolkina =

Russian basketball player

No. 16 – Dynamo Kursk
- Position: Small forward
- League: RPL

Personal information
- Born: 28 July 1997 (age 29) Penza, Russia
- Listed height: 6 ft 0 in (1.83 m)
- Listed weight: 79 kg (174 lb)

Career history
- 2017–2019: Inventa Kursk
- 2019–present: Dynamo Kursk
Medals
Women's 3x3 basketball
Representing (Russia) ROC
Olympic Games
Silver medal – second place	2020 Tokyo	Team
Women's basketball
Representing Russia
Europe U20 Championship
Bronze medal – third place	2016 Matosinhos
Bronze medal – third place	2017 Matosinhos

Olga Eduardovna Frolkina (Russian: Ольга Эдуардовна Фролкина, IPA: [ˈolʲɡə ˈfroɫkʲɪnə]; born 28 July 1997) is a Russian basketball player for Dynamo Kursk and the Russian national team. Her twin sister Evgeniia is also a professional basketball player.

She participated at the 2017 FIBA U20 European Championship, and the 2020–21 EuroLeague Women with Dynamo Kursk. She was named MVP for Dynamo Kursk in the 2020–21 season.

She qualified for the 2020 Summer Olympics, playing in a team with Mariia Cherepanova, Yulia Kozik and Anastasia Logunova in the 3×3 tournament.
