= Rae Lin D'Alie =

Italian basketball player (born 1987)

Personal information
- Nationality: Italy
- Born: 31 October 1987 (age 39) Waterford, Wisconsin, U.S.
- Height: 1.63 m (5 ft 4 in)

Sport
- Sport: Basketball

Rae Lin D'Alie (born 31 October 1987) is an Italian basketball player. She competed in the 2020 Summer Olympics.
