= Mongolia women's national 3x3 team =

Women's national basketball team of Mongolia

Mongolia
- FIBA ranking: 5
- FIBA zone: FIBA Asia
- National federation: Mongolian Basketball Association
- Coach: Stephen Sir

Olympic Games
- Appearances: 1

World Cup
- Appearances: 5
- Medals: (silver) Silver (2025)

Asia Cup
- Appearances: 8
- Medals: (silver) Silver (2013); (bronze) Bronze (2024)

Asian Games
- Appearances: 2
- Medals: (silver) Silver (2022)
Medal record
Women's 3x3 basketball
Representing Mongolia
World Cup
Silver medal – second place	2025 Ulaanbaatar	Team
Asia Cup
Silver medal – second place	2013 Doha
Bronze medal – third place	2024 Singapore
Asian Games
Silver medal – second place	2022 Hangzhou	Team

The Mongolia women's national 3x3 team is a national basketball team of Mongolia, administered by the Mongolian Basketball Association. It represents the country in international 3x3 (3 against 3) women's basketball competitions.

== Tournament record ==
=== Summer Olympics ===
Year	Position	Pld	W	L
(Japan) 2020 Tokyo	8th	7	0	7
(France) 2024 Paris	did not qualify			
(United States) 2028 Los Angeles	TBD			
Total	1/3	7	0	7

=== FIBA 3x3 World Cup ===
Year	Position	Pld	W	L
(Greece) 2012 Athens	Did not qualify			
(Russia) 2014 Moscow	Did not qualify			
(China) 2016 Guangzhou	Did not qualify			
(France) 2017 Nantes	Did not qualify			
(Philippines) 2018 Bocaue	Did not qualify			
(Netherlands) 2019 Amsterdam	17th	4	0	4
(Belgium) 2022 Antwerp	12th	4	1	3
(Austria) 2023 Vienna	18th	4	0	4
(Mongolia) 2025 Ulaanbaatar	2nd	8	6	2
(Poland) 2026 Warsaw	18th	4	0	4
2027 Singapore	To be determined			
Total	5/11	24	7	17

=== Asian Games ===
Year	Position	Pld	W	L
(Indonesia) 2018	12th	3	1	2
(China) 2022	2nd	5	4	1
(Japan) 2026	TBD			
Total	0/2	8	5	3

=== FIBA 3x3 Asia Cup ===
Year	Pos	Pld	W	L
Qatar 2013	2nd	6	4	2
China 2018	5th	3	2	1
Singapore 2022	2nd	2	1	1
Singapore 2023	2nd	2	1	1
Singapore 2024	3rd	5	3	2
Singapore 2025	5th	3	1	2
Singapore 2026	5th	3	2	1
Total	7/9	24	14	10

=== World Beach Games ===
Year	Position	Pld	W	L
Indonesia 2023 World Beach Games	Cancelled			
Vietnam 2027 World Beach Games	to be determined			
Brazil 2031 World Beach Games	to be determined			
Seychelles 2035 World Beach Games	to be determined			
Total	0/4	0	0	0

== See also ==
- Mongolia men's national 3x3 team
- Mongolia women's national basketball team
