= France at the 2020 Summer Olympics =

- IOC code: FRA
- NOC: French National Olympic and Sports Committee
- Website: www.franceolympique.com (in French)

in Tokyo, Japan July 23, 2021 – August 8, 2021
- Competitors: 385 (222 men & 172 women) in 31 sports
- Flag bearers (opening): Clarisse Agbegnenou; Samir Aït Saïd
- Flag bearer (closing): Steven Da Costa
- Medals Ranked 8th: Gold 10 Silver 12 Bronze 11 Total 33

Summer Olympics appearances (overview)
- 1896; 1900; ~~1904~~; 1908; 1912; 1920; 1924; 1928; 1932; 1936; 1948; 1952; 1956; 1960; 1964; 1968; 1972; 1976; 1980; 1984; 1988; 1992; 1996; 2000; 2004; 2008; 2012; 2016; 2020; 2024; 2028

Other related appearances
- 1906 Intercalated Games

France competed at the 2020 Summer Olympics in Tokyo. Originally scheduled to take place from 24 July to 9 August 2020, the Games were postponed to 23 July to 8 August 2021, because of the COVID-19 pandemic. French athletes have appeared in every Summer Olympic Games of the modern era, alongside Australia, Great Britain, Greece, and Switzerland. As Paris hosted 2024 Summer Olympics, France was the penultimate nation to enter the stadium, alongside the United States which will host the 2028 Summer Olympics in Los Angeles, before the host country Japan during the parade of nations at the opening ceremony. Additionally, a French segment was performed in Paris and some pre-recorded events at the closing ceremony as performers did not travel to Tokyo due to the travel restrictions related to the pandemic. However, Paris mayor Anne Hidalgo and some relatives are present during the ceremonies.France competed in all sports except baseball (softball), field hockey, and water polo.

France repeated its gold medal tally from the previous games, but its overall medal haul was down from 42 to 33, the lowest since Athens 2004. The country however scored numerous victories in team sports, namely a double in handball (both men and women won gold), gold in men's volleyball, silver in men's basketball and women's rugby sevens, and bronze in women's basketball.

== Medalists ==
| Medal | Name | Sport | Event | Date |
|---|---|---|---|---|
| Gold | Romain Cannone | Fencing | Men's épée | 25 July |
| Gold | Clarisse Agbegnenou | Judo | Women's 63 kg | 27 July |
| Gold | Matthieu Androdias; Hugo Boucheron | Rowing | Men's double sculls | 28 July |
| Gold | Clarisse Agbegnenou Shirine Boukli Amandine Buchard Guillaume Chaine Axel Clerget Sarah-Léonie Cysique Romane Dicko Alexandre Iddir Madeleine Malonga Luka Mkheidze Margaux Pinot Teddy Riner | Judo | Mixed team | 31 July |
| Gold | Erwann Le Péchoux; Enzo Lefort; Julien Mertine; Maxime Pauty | Fencing | Men's team foil | 1 August |
| Gold | Jean Quiquampoix | Shooting | Men's 25 metre rapid fire pistol | 2 August |
| Gold | Steven Da Costa | Karate | Men's 67 kg | 5 August |
| Gold | France men's national handball team: Nedim Remili; Romain Lagarde; Melvyn Richardson; Dika Mem; Nicolas Tournat; Vincent Gérard; Nikola Karabatić; Kentin Mahé; Yann Genty; Timothey N'Guessan; Luc Abalo; Michaël Guigou; Luka Karabatić; Ludovic Fabregas; Hugo Descat; Valentin Porte | Handball | Men's tournament | 7 August |
| Gold | France men's national volleyball team: Barthélémy Chinenyeze; Jenia Grebennikov (L); Jean Patry; Benjamin Toniutti (c); Kevin Tillie; Earvin N'Gapeth; Antoine Brizard; Stephen Boyer; Nicolas Le Goff; Daryl Bultor; Trévor Clévenot; Yacine Louati | Volleyball | Men's tournament | 7 August |
| Gold | France women's national handball team: Méline Nocandy; Blandine Dancette; Pauline Coatanea; Chloé Valentini; Allison Pineau; Coralie Lassource; Grâce Zaadi Deuna; Amandine Leynaud; Kalidiatou Niakaté; Cléopatre Darleux; Laura Flippes; Béatrice Edwige; Pauletta Foppa; Estelle Nze Minko; Alexandra Lacrabère | Handball | Women's tournament | 8 August |
| Silver | Amandine Buchard | Judo | Women's 52 kg | 25 July |
| Silver | Sarah-Léonie Cysique | Judo | Women's 57 kg | 26 July |
| Silver | Claire Bové; Laura Tarantola | Rowing | Women's lightweight double sculls | 29 July |
| Silver | Madeleine Malonga | Judo | Women's 78 kg | 29 July |
| Silver | Anita Blaze; Astrid Guyart; Pauline Ranvier; Ysaora Thibus | Fencing | Women's Team foil | 29 July |
| Silver | Charline Picon | Sailing | Women's RS:X | 31 July |
| Silver | Thomas Goyard | Sailing | Men's RS:X | 31 July |
| Silver | France women's national rugby sevens team: Coralie Bertrand; Anne-Cécile Ciofani; Caroline Drouin; Camille Grassineau; Lina Guérin; Fanny Horta; Shannon Izar; Chloé Jacquet; Carla Neisen; Séraphine Okemba; Chloé Pelle; Jade Ulutule | Rugby sevens | Women's tournament | 31 July |
| Silver | Sara Balzer; Cécilia Berder; Manon Brunet; Charlotte Lembach | Fencing | Women's Team sabre | 31 July |
| Silver | Florent Manaudou | Swimming | Men's 50 m freestyle | 1 August |
| Silver | Kevin Mayer | Athletics | Men's decathlon | 5 August |
| Silver | France national basketball team: Frank Ntilikina; Timothé Luwawu-Cabarrot; Thomas Heurtel; Nicolas Batum; Guerschon Yabusele; Evan Fournier; Nando de Colo; Vincent Poirier; Andrew Albicy; Rudy Gobert; Petr Cornelie; Moustapha Fall | Basketball | Men's tournament | 7 August |
| Bronze | Luka Mkheidze | Judo | Men's 60 kg | 24 July |
| Bronze | Manon Brunet | Fencing | Women's sabre | 26 July |
| Bronze | Althéa Laurin | Taekwondo | Women's +67 kg | 27 July |
| Bronze | Romane Dicko | Judo | Women's +78 kg | 30 July |
| Bronze | Teddy Riner | Judo | Men's +100 kg | 30 July |
| Bronze | Léonie Périault; Dorian Coninx; Cassandre Beaugrand; Vincent Luis | Triathlon | Mixed relay | 31 July |
| Bronze | Karim Laghouag; Christopher Six; Nicolas Touzaint | Equestrian | Team eventing | 2 August |
| Bronze | Florian Grengbo; Rayan Helal; Sébastien Vigier | Cycling | Men's team sprint | 3 August |
| Bronze | Camille Lecointre; Aloïse Retornaz | Sailing | Women's 470 | 4 August |
| Bronze | France women's national basketball team: Marine Fauthoux; Endéné Miyem; Alexia Chartereau; Sandrine Gruda; Héléna Ciak; Sarah Michel; Valériane Vukosavljević; Iliana Rupert; Gabby Williams; Marine Johannès; Alix Duchet; Diandra Tchatchouang | Basketball | Women's tournament | 7 August |
| Bronze | Benjamin Thomas; Donavan Grondin | Cycling | Men's madison | 7 August |

Medals by sport
| Sport | 1st place, gold medalist(s) | 2nd place, silver medalist(s) | 3rd place, bronze medalist(s) | Total |
| Athletics | 0 | 1 | 0 | 1 |
| Basketball | 0 | 1 | 1 | 2 |
| Cycling | 0 | 0 | 2 | 2 |
| Equestrian | 0 | 0 | 1 | 1 |
| Fencing | 2 | 2 | 1 | 5 |
| Handball | 2 | 0 | 0 | 2 |
| Judo | 2 | 3 | 3 | 8 |
| Karate | 1 | 0 | 0 | 1 |
| Rowing | 1 | 1 | 0 | 2 |
| Rugby sevens | 0 | 1 | 0 | 1 |
| Sailing | 0 | 2 | 1 | 3 |
| Shooting | 1 | 0 | 0 | 1 |
| Swimming | 0 | 1 | 0 | 1 |
| Taekwondo | 0 | 0 | 1 | 1 |
| Triathlon | 0 | 0 | 1 | 1 |
| Volleyball | 1 | 0 | 0 | 1 |
| Total | 10 | 12 | 11 | 33 |

Multiple medalists
| Name | Sport | 1st place, gold medalist(s) | 2nd place, silver medalist(s) | 3rd place, bronze medalist(s) | Total |
| Clarisse Agbegnenou | Judo | 2 | 0 | 0 | 2 |
| Sarah-Léonie Cysique | Judo | 1 | 1 | 0 | 2 |
| Amandine Buchard | Judo | 1 | 1 | 0 | 2 |
| Madeleine Malonga | Judo | 1 | 1 | 0 | 2 |
| Romane Dicko | Judo | 1 | 0 | 1 | 2 |
| Teddy Riner | Judo | 1 | 0 | 1 | 2 |
| Manon Brunet | Fencing | 0 | 1 | 1 | 2 |

== Competitors ==
| Sport | Men | Women | Total |
|---|---|---|---|
| Archery | 3 | 1 | 4 |
| Artistic swimming | —N/a | 2 | 2 |
| Athletics | 42 | 19 | 61 |
| Badminton | 2 | 2 | 4 |
| Basketball | 12 | 16 | 28 |
| Boxing | 4 | 1 | 5 |
| Canoeing | 6 | 6 | 12 |
| Cycling | 18 | 12 | 30 |
| Diving | 2 | 1 | 3 |
| Equestrian | 9 | 3 | 12 |
| Fencing | 9 | 9 | 18 |
| Football | 18 | 0 | 18 |
| Golf | 2 | 2 | 4 |
| Gymnastics | 4 | 5 | 9 |
| Handball | 15 | 16 | 31 |
| Judo | 6 | 7 | 13 |
| Karate | 1 | 2 | 3 |
| Modern pentathlon | 2 | 2 | 4 |
| Rowing | 4 | 8 | 12 |
| Rugby sevens | 0 | 12 | 12 |
| Sailing | 7 | 7 | 14 |
| Shooting | 4 | 6 | 10 |
| Skateboarding | 3 | 2 | 5 |
| Sport climbing | 2 | 2 | 4 |
| Surfing | 2 | 2 | 4 |
| Swimming | 16 | 11 | 27 |
| Table tennis | 3 | 3 | 6 |
| Tennis | 6 | 4 | 10 |
| Taekwondo | 0 | 2 | 2 |
| Triathlon | 3 | 2 | 5 |
| Volleyball | 12 | 0 | 12 |
| Weightlifting | 1 | 3 | 4 |
| Wrestling | 0 | 2 | 2 |
| Total | 222 | 172 | 393 |

== Archery ==
France fielded two archers (one man and one woman) to compete in the men's and women's individual recurve, respectively, at the Games by finishing among the top four vying for qualification at the 2021 European Championships in Antalya, Turkey.

Men

| Athlete | Event | Ranking round | | Round of 64 | Round of 32 | Round of 16 | Quarterfinals | Semifinals | Final / BM | |
| Athlete | Event | Score | Seed | Opposition Score | Opposition Score | Opposition Score | Opposition Score | Opposition Score | Opposition Score | Rank |
|---|---|---|---|---|---|---|---|---|---|---|
| Thomas Chirault | Men's individual | 648 | 51 | Broeksma (NED); L 4–6 | Did not advance | | | | | |
| Pierre Plihon | Men's individual | 653 | 36 | Williams (USA); W 6–4 | Kim W-j (KOR); L 2–6 | Did not advance | | | | |
| Jean-Charles Valladont | Men's individual | 640 | 57 | van den Berg (NED); L 3–7 | Did not advance | | | | | |
| Thomas Chirault; Pierre Plihon; Jean-Charles Valladont | Men's team | 1941 | 12 | —N/a | | United States; L 0–6 | Did not advance | | | |

Women

| Athlete | Event | Ranking round | | Round of 64 | Round of 32 | Round of 16 | Quarterfinals | Semifinals | Final / BM | |
| Athlete | Event | Score | Seed | Opposition Score | Opposition Score | Opposition Score | Opposition Score | Opposition Score | Opposition Score | Rank |
|---|---|---|---|---|---|---|---|---|---|---|
| Lisa Barbelin | Women's individual | 654 | 13 | Andreoli (ITA); W 6–2 | Schloesser (NED); W 6–0 | Valencia (MEX); L 0–6 | Did not advance | | | |

Mixed

| Athlete | Event | Ranking round | | Round of 16 | Quarterfinals | Semifinals | Final / BM | |
| Athlete | Event | Score | Seed | Opposition Score | Opposition Score | Opposition Score | Opposition Score | Rank |
|---|---|---|---|---|---|---|---|---|
| Jean-Charles Valladont; Lisa Barbelin | Mixed team | 1307 | 14 Q | Japan; W 5–3 | Netherlands; L 4–5 | Did not advance | | |

== Artistic swimming ==
France fielded a squad of two artistic swimmers to compete in the women's duet event, by winning the silver medal at the 2021 FINA Olympic Qualification Tournament in Barcelona, Spain.

| Athlete | Event | Technical routine | | Free routine (preliminary) | | | Free routine (final) | | |
| Athlete | Event | Points | Rank | Points | Total (technical + free) | Rank | Points | Total (technical + free) | Rank |
|---|---|---|---|---|---|---|---|---|---|
| Charlotte Tremble; Laura Tremble | Duet | 87.3474 | 8 | 88.5667 | 175.9141 | 8 Q | 89.6333 | 176.9807 | 8 |

== Athletics ==
French athletes further achieved the entry standards, either by qualifying time or by world ranking, in the following track and field events (up to a maximum of three athletes in each event):

On 19 March 2020, four marathon runners (Amdouni, Chahdi, Navarro, and Kipsang), along with race walkers Kévin Campion and three-time Olympian Yohann Diniz, became the first French track and field athletes to be officially selected to the Tokyo 2020 roster.

On 2 July 2021, 65 athletes, 44 men and 21 women, are announced to be part of the team.

Key

- Note–Ranks given for track events are within the athlete's heat only
- Q = Qualified for the next round
- q = Qualified for the next round as a fastest loser or, in field events, by position without achieving the qualifying target
- NR = National record
- N/A = Round not applicable for the event
- Bye = Athlete not required to compete in round

Track & road events
Men

| Athlete | Event | Heat | | Quarterfinal | | Semifinal | | Final | |
| Athlete | Event | Result | Rank | Result | Rank | Result | Rank | Result | Rank |
|---|---|---|---|---|---|---|---|---|---|
| Jimmy Vicaut | 100 m | Bye | | 10.07 | 2 Q | 10.11 | 5 | Did not advance | |
| Pierre-Ambroise Bosse | 800 m | 1:45.97 | 6 q | —N/a | | 1:48.62 | 6 | Did not advance | |
| Benjamin Robert | 800 m | 1:47.12 | 5 | —N/a | | Did not advance | | | |
| Gabriel Tual | 800 m | 1:45.63 | 3 Q | —N/a | | 1:44.28 | 3 q | 1:46.03 | 7 |
| Azzedine Habz | 1500 m | 3:41.24 | 4 Q | —N/a | | 3:35.12 | 10 | Did not advance | |
| Alexis Miellet | 1500 m | 3:41.23 | 14 | —N/a | | Did not advance | | | |
| Baptiste Mischler | 1500 m | 3:37.53 | 11 | —N/a | | Did not advance | | | |
| Jimmy Gressier | 5000 m | 13:33.47 | 9 q | —N/a | | | | 13:11.33 | 13 |
| Hugo Hay | 5000 m | 13:39.95 | 7 | —N/a | | | | Did not advance | |
| Morhad Amdouni | 10000 m | —N/a | | | | | | 27:53.58 | 10 |
| Wilhem Belocian | 110 m hurdles | DSQ | | —N/a | | Did not advance | | | |
| Pascal Martinot-Lagarde | 110 m hurdles | 13.37 | 2 Q | —N/a | | 13.25 | 2 Q | 13.16 | 5 |
| Aurel Manga | 110 m hurdles | 13.24 | 1 Q | —N/a | | 13.24 | 2 Q | 13.38 | 8 |
| Wilfried Happio | 400 m hurdles | 49.39 | 5 q | —N/a | | 49.49 | 7 | Did not advance | |
| Ludvy Vaillant | 400 m hurdles | 49.23 | 5 q | —N/a | | 49.02 | 7 | Did not advance | |
| Djilali Bedrani | 3000 m steeplechase | 8:20.23 | 7 | —N/a | | | | Did not advance | |
| Louis Gilavert | 3000 m steeplechase | 8:36.35 | 12 | —N/a | | | | Did not advance | |
| Alexis Phelut | 3000 m steeplechase | 8:19.36 | 3 Q | —N/a | | | | 8:23.14 | 12 |
| Mouhamadou Fall; Jimmy Vicaut; Méba-Mickaël Zézé; Ryan Zézé | 4 × 100 m relay | 38.18 | 4 | —N/a | | | | Did not advance | |
| Gilles Biron; Thomas Jordier; Muhammad Abdallah Kounta; Ludovic Ouceni | 4 × 400 m relay | 3:00.81 PB | 6 | —N/a | | | | Did not advance | |
| Morhad Amdouni | Marathon | —N/a | | | | | | 2:14:33 | 17 |
| Hassan Chahdi | Marathon | —N/a | | | | | | 2:18:40 | 45 |
| Nicolas Navarro | Marathon | —N/a | | | | | | 2:12:50 | 12 |
| Gabriel Bordier | 20 km walk | —N/a | | | | | | 1:25:23 | 24 |
| Kévin Campion | 20 km walk | —N/a | | | | | | 1:23:53 | 16 |
| Yohann Diniz | 50 km walk | —N/a | | | | | | DNF | |

Women

| Athlete | Event | Heat | | Semifinal | | Final | |
| Athlete | Event | Result | Rank | Result | Rank | Result | Rank |
|---|---|---|---|---|---|---|---|
| Gemina Joseph | 200 m | 22.94 | 3 Q | 23.19 | 7 | Did not advance | |
| Amandine Brossier | 400 m | 51.65 | 2 Q | 51.30 | 6 | Did not advance | |
| Rénelle Lamote | 800 m | 2:01.92 | 1 Q | 1:59.40 | 5 | Did not advance | |
| Cyréna Samba-Mayela | 100 m hurdles | DNS | | Did not advance | | | |
| Laura Valette | 100 m hurdles | DSQ | | Did not advance | | | |
| Gémima Joseph; Cynthia Leduc; Orlann Ombissa-Dzangue; Carolle Zahi | 4 × 100 m relay | 42.68 | 4 q | —N/a | | 42.89 | 7 |
| Amandine Brossier; Floria Gueï; Sokhna Lacoste; Brigitte Ntiamoah | 4 × 400 m relay | 3:25.07 | 5 | —N/a | | Did not advance | |
| Susan Jeptooo Kipsang | Marathon | —N/a | | | | 2:36:29 | 38 |

Field events
Men

| Athlete | Event | Qualification | | Final | |
| Athlete | Event | Distance | Position | Distance | Position |
|---|---|---|---|---|---|
| Augustin Bey | Long jump | NM | — | Did not advance | |
| Benjamin Compaoré | Triple jump | 16.59 | 19 | Did not advance | |
| Jean-Marc Pontvianne | Triple jump | NM | — | Did not advance | |
| Melvin Raffin | Triple jump | 16.83 | 11 q | NM | — |
| Ethan Cormont | Pole vault | 5.50 | 22 | Did not advance | |
| Renaud Lavillenie | Pole vault | 5.75 | 6 Q | 5.70 | 8 |
| Valentin Lavillenie | Pole vault | 5.65 | 17 | Did not advance | |
| Lolassonn Djouhan | Discus throw | 60.74 | 21 | Did not advance | |
| Quentin Bigot | Hammer throw | 78.73 | 4 Q | 79.39 | 5 |

Women

| Athlete | Event | Qualification | | Final | |
| Athlete | Event | Distance | Position | Distance | Position |
|---|---|---|---|---|---|
| Yanis David | Long jump | 6.27 | 23 | Did not advance | |
| Rouguy Diallo | Triple jump | 14.29 | 10 q | 14.38 | 9 |
| Mélina Robert-Michon | Discus throw | 60.88 | 14 | Did not advance | |
| Alexandra Tavernier | Hammer throw | 73.51 | 5 Q | 74.41 | 4 |

Combined events – Men's decathlon

| Athlete | Event | 100 m | LJ | SP | HJ | 400 m | 110H | DT | PV | JT | 1500 m | Final | Rank |
|---|---|---|---|---|---|---|---|---|---|---|---|---|---|
| Kevin Mayer | Result | 10.68 | 7.50 | 15.07 | 2.08 | 50.31 | 13.90 | 48.08 | 5.20 | 73.09 | 4:43.17 | 8726 | 2nd place, silver medalist(s) |
| Kevin Mayer | Points | 933 | 935 | 794 | 878 | 800 | 987 | 830 | 972 | 937 | 660 | 8726 | 2nd place, silver medalist(s) |

== Badminton ==
France entered four badminton players for each of the following events into the Olympic tournament based on the BWF World Race to Tokyo Rankings: one entry each in the men's and women's singles and in the mixed doubles. The team was officially announced by the FFBaD on 23 June 2021.

| Athlete | Event | Group Stage | | | | Elimination | Quarterfinal | Semifinal | Final / BM | |
| Athlete | Event | Opposition Score | Opposition Score | Opposition Score | Rank | Opposition Score | Opposition Score | Opposition Score | Opposition Score | Rank |
|---|---|---|---|---|---|---|---|---|---|---|
| Brice Leverdez | Men's singles | Pochtarov (UKR); W (21–10, 21–8) | Lee (MAS); L (21–17, 21–5) | —N/a | 2 | Did not advance | | | | |
| Qi Xuefei | Women's singles | Nguyễn (VIE); L (11–21, 11–21) | Jaquet (SUI); W (21–10 21–14) | Tai T-y (TPE); L (10–21, 13–21) | 3 | Did not advance | | | | |
| Thom Gicquel; Delphine Delrue | Mixed doubles | Ellis / Smith (GBR); L (18–21, 17–21) | Puavaranukroh / Taerattanachai (THA); L (9–21, 15–21) | Hurlburt-Yu / Wu (CAN); W (21–12, 21–13) | 3 | —N/a | Did not advance | | | |

== Basketball ==
=== Indoor ===
Summary

| Team | Event | Group stage | | | | Quarterfinal | Semifinal | Final / BM | |
| Team | Event | Opposition Score | Opposition Score | Opposition Score | Rank | Opposition Score | Opposition Score | Opposition Score | Rank |
|---|---|---|---|---|---|---|---|---|---|
| France men's | Men's tournament | United States; W 83–76 | Czech Republic; W 97–77 | Iran; W 79–62 | 1 Q | Italy; W 84–75 | Slovenia; W 90–89 | United States; L 82–87 | 2nd place, silver medalist(s) |
| France women's | Women's tournament | Japan; L 70–74 | Nigeria; W 87–62 | United States; L 82–93 | 3 q | Spain; W 67–64 | Japan; L 71–87 | Serbia; W 91–76 | 3rd place, bronze medalist(s) |

==== Men's tournament ====
France men's basketball team qualified for the Games by reaching the semifinal stage and securing an outright berth as one of two highest-ranked squads from Europe at the 2019 FIBA Basketball World Cup in China.

Team roster

The roster was announced on 21 May 2021.

France men's national basketball team roster
Players
Coaches

| Pos. | No. | Name | Age – Date of birth | Height | Club | Ctr. |
|---|---|---|---|---|---|---|
| PG | 1 | Frank Ntilikina | 22 – 28 July 1998 | 1.98 m (6 ft 6 in) | New York Knicks | (United States) |
| G | 3 | Timothé Luwawu-Cabarrot | 26 – 9 May 1995 | 1.98 m (6 ft 6 in) | Brooklyn Nets | (United States) |
| PG | 4 | Thomas Heurtel | 32 – 10 April 1989 | 1.88 m (6 ft 2 in) | ASVEL Basket | (France) |
| SF | 5 | Nicolas Batum | 32 – 14 December 1988 | 2.03 m (6 ft 8 in) | Los Angeles Clippers | (United States) |
| PF | 7 | Guerschon Yabusele | 25 – 17 December 1995 | 2.03 m (6 ft 8 in) | ASVEL Basket | (France) |
| SG | 10 | Evan Fournier | 28 – 29 October 1992 | 1.99 m (6 ft 6 in) | Boston Celtics | (United States) |
| SG | 12 | Nando de Colo | 34 – 23 June 1987 | 1.96 m (6 ft 5 in) | Fenerbahçe | (Turkey) |
| C | 17 | Vincent Poirier | 27 – 17 October 1993 | 2.13 m (7 ft 0 in) | Real Madrid | (Spain) |
| PG | 21 | Andrew Albicy | 31 – 21 March 1990 | 1.78 m (5 ft 10 in) | CB Gran Canaria | (Spain) |
| C | 27 | Rudy Gobert | 29 – 26 June 1992 | 2.15 m (7 ft 1 in) | Utah Jazz | (United States) |
| C | 28 | Petr Cornelie | 25 – 26 July 1995 | 2.11 m (6 ft 11 in) | Pau-Lacq-Orthez | (France) |
| C | 93 | Moustapha Fall | 29 – 23 February 1992 | 2.18 m (7 ft 2 in) | ASVEL Basket | (France) |

Head coach

- (France) Vincent Collet

Assistant coach(es)

- (France) Pascal Donnadieu
- (France) Ruddy Nelhomme

Legend

- (C) Team captain
- Club – describes last
  club before the competition
- Age – describes age
  on 25 July 2021

Group play

| Pos | Team | Pld | W | L | PF | PA | PD | Pts | Qualification |
|---|---|---|---|---|---|---|---|---|---|
| 1 | France | 3 | 3 | 0 | 259 | 215 | +44 | 6 | Quarterfinals |
| 2 | United States | 3 | 2 | 1 | 315 | 233 | +82 | 5 | Quarterfinals |
| 3 | Czech Republic | 3 | 1 | 2 | 245 | 294 | −49 | 4 | |
| 4 | Iran | 3 | 0 | 3 | 206 | 283 | −77 | 3 | |

Source: TOCOG and FIBA
Rules for classification: 1) classification points; 2) head-to-head results; 3) head-to-head game points difference; 4) head-to-head number of game points scored.

25 July 2021
21:00
v

Boxscore

| France | 83–76 | United States |
Scoring by quarter: 15–22, 22–23, 25–11, 21–20
| Pts: Fournier 28; Rebs: Gobert 9 Asts: Batum, De Colo 5 | | Pts: Holiday 18; Rebs: Adebayo 10; Asts: Green, Holiday 4 |

Saitama Super Arena, Saitama
Referees: Guilherme Locatelli (BRA), Michael Weiland (CAN), Manuel Mazzoni (ITA)

28 July 2021
21:00
v

Boxscore

| Czech Republic | 77–97 | France |
Scoring by quarter: 28–22, 12–29, 16–26, 21–20
| Pts: Veselý 19; Rebs: Balvín 8 Asts: Satoranský 9 | | Pts: Fournier 21; Rebs: Gobert 10; Asts: De Colo 8 |

Saitama Super Arena, Saitama
Referees: Juan Fernández (ARG), Manuel Mazzoni (ITA), Leandro Lezcano (ARG)

31 July 2021
10:00
v

Boxscore

| Iran | 62–79 | France |
Scoring by quarter: 17–22, 10–24, 20–16, 15–17
| Pts: Haddadi 18; Rebs: Haddadi 12; Asts: Haddadi 5 | | Pts: Heurtel 16; Rebs: four players 5 Asts: De Colo 5 |

Saitama Super Arena, Saitama
Referees: Guilherme Locatelli (BRA), Leandro Lezcano (ARG), Rabah Noujaim (LIB)

Quarterfinal

3 August 2021
17:20
v

Boxscore

| Italy | 75–84 | France |
Scoring by quarter: 25–20, 17–23, 12–21, 21–20
| Pts: Fontecchio 23; Rebs: Gallinari 10; Asts: Pajola 6 | | Pts: Gobert 22; Rebs: Batum 14; Asts: De Colo 7 |

Saitama Super Arena, Saitama
Referees: Roberto Vázquez (PUR), Juan Fernández (ARG), Steven Anderson (USA)

Semifinal

5 August 2021
20:00
v

Boxscore

| France | 90–89 | Slovenia |
Scoring by quarter: 27–29, 15–15, 29–21, 19–24
| Pts: De Colo 25; Rebs: Gobert 16; Asts: De Colo 5 | | Pts: Tobey 23; Rebs: Dončić 10; Asts: Dončić 18 |

Saitama Super Arena, Saitama
Referees: Guilherme Locatelli (BRA), Juan Fernández (ARG), Mārtiņš Kozlovskis (LAT)

Gold medal game

7 August 2021
11:30
v

Boxscore

| France | 82–87 | United States |
Scoring by quarter: 18–22, 21–22, 24–27, 19–16
| Pts: Fournier, Gobert 16; Rebs: Gobert 8 Asts: de Colo 7 | | Pts: Durant 29; Rebs: Tatum 7 Asts: Green 5 |

Saitama Super Arena, Saitama
Referees: Guilherme Locatelli (BRA), Ademir Zurapović (BIH), Michael Weiland (CAN)

==== Women's tournament ====
France women's basketball team qualified for the Olympics as one of three highest-ranked eligible squads at the Bourges meet of the 2020 FIBA Women's Olympic Qualifying Tournament.

Team roster

A 15-player roster was announced on 1 July 2021. The final roster was revealed on 5 July 2021.

France women's national basketball team – 2020 Summer Olympics roster
Players
Coaches

| Pos. | No. | Name | Age – Date of birth | Height | Club | Ctr. |
|---|---|---|---|---|---|---|
| PG | 4 | Marine Fauthoux | 20 – 23 January 2001 | 1.76 m (5 ft 9 in) | ASVEL Féminin | (France) |
| PF | 5 | Endéné Miyem | 33 – 15 May 1988 | 1.88 m (6 ft 2 in) | Flammes Carolo | (France) |
| PF | 6 | Alexia Chartereau | 22 – 5 September 1998 | 1.90 m (6 ft 3 in) | Tango Bourges Basket | (France) |
| C | 7 | Sandrine Gruda | 34 – 25 June 1987 | 1.93 m (6 ft 4 in) | PF Schio | (Italy) |
| C | 8 | Héléna Ciak | 31 – 15 December 1989 | 1.97 m (6 ft 6 in) | ASVEL Féminin | (France) |
| SG | 10 | Sarah Michel | 32 – 10 January 1989 | 1.80 m (5 ft 11 in) | Tango Bourges Basket | (France) |
| SF | 11 | Valériane Vukosavljević | 27 – 29 April 1994 | 1.84 m (6 ft 0 in) | Basket Lattes | (France) |
| C | 12 | Iliana Rupert | 20 – 12 July 2001 | 1.94 m (6 ft 4 in) | Tango Bourges Basket | (France) |
| F | 15 | Gabby Williams | 24 – 9 September 1996 | 1.80 m (5 ft 11 in) | Sopron Basket | (Hungary) |
| SG | 23 | Marine Johannès | 26 – 21 January 1995 | 1.77 m (5 ft 10 in) | ASVEL Féminin | (France) |
| PG | 39 | Alix Duchet | 23 – 30 December 1997 | 1.68 m (5 ft 6 in) | Tango Bourges Basket | (France) |
| SF | 93 | Diandra Tchatchouang | 30 – 14 June 1991 | 1.89 m (6 ft 2 in) | Basket Lattes | (France) |

Head coach

- (France) Valérie Garnier

Assistant coach(es)

- (France) Grégory Halin
- (France) Olivier Lafargue
- (France) Rachid Meziane

Legend

- Club – describes last
  club before the tournament
- Age – describes age
  on 26 July 2021

Group play

| Pos | Team | Pld | W | L | PF | PA | PD | Pts | Qualification |
|---|---|---|---|---|---|---|---|---|---|
| 1 | United States | 3 | 3 | 0 | 260 | 223 | +37 | 6 | Quarterfinals |
| 2 | Japan (H) | 3 | 2 | 1 | 245 | 239 | +6 | 5 | Quarterfinals |
| 3 | France | 3 | 1 | 2 | 239 | 229 | +10 | 4 | Quarterfinals |
| 4 | Nigeria | 3 | 0 | 3 | 217 | 270 | −53 | 3 | |

Source: TOCOG and FIBA
Rules for classification: 1) classification points; 2) head-to-head results; 3) head-to-head game points difference; 4) head-to-head number of game points scored.
(H) Hosts

27 July 2021
10:00
v

Boxscore

| Japan | 74–70 | France |
Scoring by quarter: 13–17, 21–19, 18–13, 22–21
| Pts: Hayashi 12; Rebs: Akaho 9 Asts: Machida 11 | | Pts: Gruda 18; Rebs: Gruda 9 Asts: Johannès 4 |

Saitama Super Arena, Saitama
Referees: Maripier Malo (CAN), James Boyer (AUS), Yevgeniy Mikheyev (KAZ)

30 July 2021
17:20
v

Boxscore

| France | 87–62 | Nigeria |
Scoring by quarter: 18–12, 26–15, 23–15, 20–20
| Pts: Gruda 14; Rebs: Gruda, Williams 9 Asts: Duchet 5 | | Pts: Amukamara 11; Rebs: three players 4 Asts: Amukamara, Kalu 3 |

Saitama Super Arena, Saitama
Referees: Scott Beker (AUS), Luis Castillo (ESP), Samir Abaakil (MAR)

2 August 2021
13:40
v

Boxscore

| France | 82–93 | United States |
Scoring by quarter: 22–19, 22–31, 23–21, 15–22
| Pts: Miyem 15; Rebs: Gruda 6 Asts: Johannès 7 | | Pts: Wilson 22; Rebs: Stewart, Wilson 7 Asts: Loyd 8 |

Saitama Super Arena, Saitama
Referees: Manuel Mazzoni (ITA), Ferdinand Pascual (PHI), Rabah Noujaim (LIB)

Quarterfinal

4 August 2021
21:00
v

Boxscore

| Spain | 64–67 | France |
Scoring by quarter: 16–21, 14–15, 18–19, 16–12
| Pts: Ndour 16; Rebs: Ndour 11; Asts: Gil 4 | | Pts: Johannès 18; Rebs: three players 5 Asts: Duchet 5 |

Saitama Super Arena, Saitama
Referees: Manuel Mazzoni (ITA), Andreia Silva (BRA), Scott Beker (AUS)

Semifinal

6 August 2021
20:00
v

Boxscore

| Japan | 87–71 | France |
Scoring by quarter: 14–22, 27–12, 27–16, 19–21
| Pts: Akaho 17; Rebs: Akaho, Miyazawa 7 Asts: Machida 18 | | Pts: Gruda 18; Rebs: Williams 8 Asts: Williams 7 |

Saitama Super Arena, Saitama
Referees: Maripier Malo (CAN), Luis Castillo (ESP), Yevgeniy Mikheyev (KAZ)

Bronze medal match

7 August 2021
16:00
v

Boxscore

| Serbia | 76–91 | France |
Scoring by quarter: 23–19, 17–24, 16–24, 20–24
| Pts: Anderson 24; Rebs: Vasić 8 Asts: Anderson, Brooks 5 | | Pts: Williams 17; Rebs: Williams 8 Asts: three players 4 |

Saitama Super Arena, Saitama
Referees: Juan Fernández (ARG), Amy Bonner (USA), Takaki Kato (JPN)

=== 3×3 basketball ===
Summary

| Team | Event | Group stage | | | | | | | | Quarterfinal | Semifinal | Final / BM | |
| Team | Event | Opposition Score | Opposition Score | Opposition Score | Opposition Score | Opposition Score | Opposition Score | Opposition Score | Rank | Opposition Score | Opposition Score | Opposition Score | Rank |
|---|---|---|---|---|---|---|---|---|---|---|---|---|---|
| France women's 3×3 | Women's 3×3 tournament | United States; L 10–17 | Italy; W 19–16 | Japan; L 15–19 | China; L 13–20 | Mongolia; W 22–18 | ROC; W 17–14 | Romania; W 22–12 | 5 Q | Japan; W 16–14 | United States; L 16–18 | China; L 14–16 | 4 |

==== Women's tournament ====
France women's national 3x3 team qualified for the Olympics by securing a top three finish at the 2021 Olympic Qualifying Tournament.

Team roster

The players were announced on 2 July 2021.

- Ana Maria Filip
- Laëtitia Guapo
- Marie-Ève Paget
- Mamignan Touré

Group play

| Pos | Team | Pld | W | L | PF | PA | PD | Qualification |
|---|---|---|---|---|---|---|---|---|
| 1 | United States | 7 | 6 | 1 | 136 | 98 | +38 | Semifinals |
| 2 | ROC | 7 | 5 (Note: ROC 2–0, China 1–1, Japan 0–2) | 2 | 129 | 90 | +39 | Semifinals |
| 3 | China | 7 | 5 | 2 | 127 | 97 | +30 | Quarterfinals |
| 4 | Japan (H) | 7 | 5 | 2 | 130 | 97 | +33 | Quarterfinals |
| 5 | France | 7 | 4 | 3 | 118 | 116 | +2 | Quarterfinals |
| 6 | Italy | 7 | 2 | 5 | 98 | 125 | −27 | Quarterfinals |
| 7 | Romania | 7 | 1 | 6 | 89 | 142 | −53 | |
| 8 | Mongolia | 7 | 0 | 7 | 79 | 141 | −62 | |

Source: TOCOG and FIBA
Rules for classification: 1) Wins; 2) Head-to-head record; 3) Points scored.
(H) Hosts
Notes:

24 July 2021
17:55
v

Report

| United States | 17–10 | France |
| Pts: Dolson 7 | | Pts: Paget, Touré 3 |

Aomi Urban Sports Park, Tokyo
Referees: Jasmina Juras (SRB), Edmond Ho (HKG)

24 July 2021
21:25
v

Report

| France | 19–16 | Italy |
| Pts: Filip, Guapo 6 | | Pts: D'Alie 8 |

Aomi Urban Sports Park, Tokyo
Referees: Shi Qirong (CHN), Jasmina Juras (SRB)

25 July 2021
17:55
v

Report

| Japan | 19–15 | France |
| Pts: three players 5 | | Pts: Paget 6 |

Aomi Urban Sports Park, Tokyo
Referees: Evgeny Ostrovskiy (RUS), Vanessa Devlin (AUS)

25 July 2021
21:00
v

Report

| China | 20–13 | France |
| Pts: Wang L., Yang 7 | | Pts: Touré 5 |

Aomi Urban Sports Park, Tokyo
Referees: Glenn Tuitt (USA), Evgeny Ostrovskiy (RUS)

26 July 2021
17:30
v

Report

| France | 22–18 | Mongolia |
| Pts: Guapo 9 | | Pts: Khulan, Tserenlkham 7 |

Aomi Urban Sports Park, Tokyo
Referees: Evgeny Ostrovskiy (RUS), Sara El-Sharnouby (EGY)

26 July 2021
21:25
v

Report

| France | 17–14 | ROC |
| Pts: Touré 10 | | Pts: three players 4 |

Aomi Urban Sports Park, Tokyo
Referees: Jasmina Juras (SRB), Shi Qirong (CHN)

27 July 2021
17:00
v

Report

| France | 22–12 | Romania |
| Pts: Touré 11 | | Pts: Ursu-Kim, Stoenescu 4 |

Aomi Urban Sports Park, Tokyo
Referees: Glenn Tuitt (USA), Su Yu-yen (TPE)

Quarterfinal

27 July 2021
21:50
v

Report

| Japan | 14–16 | France |
| Pts: Shinozaki 7 | | Pts: Paget 5 |

Aomi Urban Sports Park, Tokyo
Referees: Evgeny Ostrovskiy (RUS), Cecília Tóth (HUN)

Semifinal

28 July 2021
17:00
v

Report

| United States | 18–16 | France |
| Pts: Gray, Plum 6 | | Pts: Filip 8 |

Aomi Urban Sports Park, Tokyo
Referees: Jasmina Juras (SRB), Vlad Ghizdareanu (ROU)

Bronze medal match

28 July 2021
20:45
v

Report

| France | 14–16 | China |
| Pts: Touré 8 | | Pts: Wang 9 |

Aomi Urban Sports Park, Tokyo
Referees: Evgeny Ostrovskiy (RUS), Jasmina Juras (SRB)

== Boxing ==
France entered six boxers (five men and one woman) into the Olympic tournament. 2019 world bronze medalist Billal Bennama (men's flyweight), Samuel Kistohurry (men's featherweight), Rio 2016 silver medalist Sofiane Oumiha (men's lightweight), Mourad Aliev (men's super heavyweight), and Maïva Hamadouche (women's lightweight) secured the spots on the French squad in their respective weight divisions, either by winning the round of 16 match, advancing to the semifinal match, or scoring a box-off triumph, at the 2020 European Qualification Tournament in London and Paris.

| Athlete | Event | Round of 32 | Round of 16 | Quarterfinals | Semifinals | Final | |
| Athlete | Event | Opposition Result | Opposition Result | Opposition Result | Opposition Result | Opposition Result | Rank |
|---|---|---|---|---|---|---|---|
| Billal Bennama | Men's flyweight | —N/a | Bibossinov (KAZ); L 0–5 | Did not advance | | | |
| Samuel Kistohurry | Men's featherweight | Ragan (USA); L 2–3 | Did not advance | | | | |
| Sofiane Oumiha | Men's lightweight | —N/a | Davis (USA); L RSC | Did not advance | | | |
| Mourad Aliev | Men's super heavyweight | —N/a | Zukhurov (TJK); W 5–0 | Clarke (GBR); L DSQ | Did not advance | | |
| Maïva Hamadouche | Women's lightweight | Potkonen (FIN); L 1–3 | Did not advance | | | | |

== Canoeing ==
=== Slalom ===
French canoeists qualified one boat for each of the following classes through the 2019 ICF Canoe Slalom World Championships in La Seu d'Urgell, Spain. The slalom canoeists, including Rio 2016 Olympian Marie-Zélia Lafont in the women's K-1, were officially named to the French roster on 15 October 2020.

| Athlete | Event | Preliminary | | | | | | Semifinal | | Final | |
| Athlete | Event | Run 1 | Rank | Run 2 | Rank | Best | Rank | Time | Rank | Time | Rank |
|---|---|---|---|---|---|---|---|---|---|---|---|
| Martin Thomas | Men's C-1 | 102.75 | 7 | 102.83 | 7 | 102.75 | 9 Q | 100.65 | 1 Q | 104.98 | 5 |
| Boris Neveu | Men's K-1 | 147.12 | 21 | 91.78 | 5 | 91.78 | 5 Q | 94.86 | 2 Q | 101.18 | 7 |
| Marjorie Delassus | Women's C-1 | 121.74 | 12 | 167.47 | 19 | 121.74 | 17 Q | 117.71 | 5 Q | 115.93 | 4 |
| Marie-Zélia Lafont | Women's K-1 | 121.48 | 19 | 110.25 | 11 | 110.25 | 13 Q | 115.81 | 14 | Did not advance | |

=== Sprint ===
French canoeists qualified five boats in each of the following distances for the Games through the 2019 ICF Canoe Sprint World Championships in Szeged, Hungary. Meanwhile, one additional boat was awarded to the French canoeist in the men's K-1 1000 m by winning the bronze medal at the 2021 European Canoe Sprint Qualification Regatta. The sprint canoeists, including Rio 2016 silver medalist Maxime Beaumont in the men's K-1 200 m, were officially named to the French roster on 8 June 2021.

Men

| Athlete | Event | Heats | | Quarterfinals | | Semifinals | | Final | |
| Athlete | Event | Time | Rank | Time | Rank | Time | Rank | Time | Rank |
|---|---|---|---|---|---|---|---|---|---|
| Adrien Bart | C-1 1000 m | 4:03.771 | 2 SF | Bye | | 4:04.026 | 1 FA | 4:06.171 | 4 |
| Maxime Beaumont | K-1 200 m | 35.259 | 2 SF | Bye | | 36.072 | 6 FB | 35.998 | 9 |
| Guillaume Burger | K-1 1000 m | 3:53.241 | 4 QF | 3:52.817 | 5 | Did not advance | | | |
| Etienne Hubert | K-1 1000 m | 3:45.072 | 4 QF | 3:46.274 | 2 SF | 3:27.319 | 6 FB | 3:31.553 | 15 |
| Guillaume Burger; Étienne Hubert | K-2 1000 m | 3:29.296 | 5 QF | 3:18.284 | 5 FB | Bye | | 3:32.690 | 15 |

Women

| Athlete | Event | Heats | | Quarterfinals | | Semifinals | | Final | |
| Athlete | Event | Time | Rank | Time | Rank | Time | Rank | Time | Rank |
|---|---|---|---|---|---|---|---|---|---|
| Léa Jamelot | K-1 200 m | 43.589 | 6 QF | 43.338 | 4 | Did not advance | | | |
| Vanina Paoletti | K-1 200 m | 42.334 | 3 QF | 43.163 | 4 | Did not advance | | | |
| Manon Hostens | K-1 500 m | 1:53.668 | 6 QF | 1:54.095 | 2 SF | 1:57.394 | 6 FC | 1:58.133 | 23 |
| Manon Hostens; Sarah Guyot | K-2 500 m | 1:45.533 | 2 SF | Bye | | 1:38.632 | 3 FA | 1:40.329 | 7 |
| Sarah Guyot; Manon Hostens; Léa Jamelot; Vanina Paoletti | K-4 500 m | 1:39.032 | 5 QF | 1:37.138 | 4 SF | 1:38.202 | 5 FB | 1:38.346 | 9 |

Qualification Legend: FA = Qualify to final A (medal); FB = Qualify to final B (non-medal)

== Cycling ==
=== Road ===
France entered a squad of six riders (five men and one woman) to compete in their respective Olympic road races, by virtue of their top 50 national finish (for men) and top 22 (for women) in the UCI World Ranking. Juliette Labous was named as part of the ninth batch of nominated French athletes to the Tokyo 2020 roster on 11 May 2021.

| Athlete | Event | Time | Rank |
|---|---|---|---|
| Rémi Cavagna | Men's road race | Did not finish | |
| Rémi Cavagna | Men's time trial | 58:39.06 | 17 |
| Benoît Cosnefroy | Men's road race | 6:16:53 | 57 |
| Kenny Elissonde | Men's road race | 6:15:38 | 38 |
| David Gaudu | Men's road race | 6:06:33 | 7 |
| Guillaume Martin | Men's road race | 6:11:46 | 27 |
| Juliette Labous | Women's road race | 3:56:07 | 30 |
| Juliette Labous | Women's time trial | 32:42.14 | 9 |

=== Track ===
Following the completion of the 2020 UCI Track Cycling World Championships, French riders accumulated spots in the men's team sprint, women's team pursuit, men's and women's omnium and men's and women's madison. As a result of their place in the men's team sprint, France won its right to enter two riders in the men's sprint and keirin. Unable to earn a quota place in the women's team sprint, France entered at least one rider to compete in the women's sprint and keirin based on her final individual UCI Olympic rankings.

The sprint riders were officially named as part of the tenth batch of nominated French athletes to the Tokyo 2020 roster on 26 May 2021.

Sprint

| Athlete | Event | Qualification | | Round 1 | Repechage 1 | Round 2 | Repechage 2 | 1/8 Finals | Repechage 3 | Quarterfinals | Semifinals | Final | |
| Athlete | Event | Time Speed (km/h) | Rank | Opposition Time Speed (km/h) | Opposition Time Speed (km/h) | Opposition Time Speed (km/h) | Opposition Time Speed (km/h) | Opposition Time Speed (km/h) | Opposition Time Speed (km/h) | Opposition Time Speed (km/h) | Opposition Time Speed (km/h) | Opposition Time Speed (km/h) | Rank |
|---|---|---|---|---|---|---|---|---|---|---|---|---|---|
| Rayan Helal | Men's sprint | 9.669; 74.465 | 20 Q | Dmitriev (ROC); L | Bötticher (GER); Richardson (AUS); L | Did not advance | | | | | | | |
| Sébastien Vigier | Men's sprint | 9.551; 75.385 | 10 Q | Barrette (CAN); W 10.182; 70.713 | Bye | Webster (NZL); L | Tjon En Fa (SUR); W 9.900; 72.727 | Carlin (GBR); L | Webster (NZL); Sahrom (MAS); W 10.169; 70.803 | Hoogland (NED); L | Did not advance | Fifth place final Levy (GER); Paul (TTO); Kenny (GBR); L | 7 |
| Mathilde Gros | Women's sprint | 10.400; 69.231 | 4 Q | Lee H-j (KOR); W 11.216; 64.194 | Bye | Kobayashi (JPN); W 11.292; 63.762 | Bye | Lee W-s (HKG); L | Genest (CAN); Voynova (ROC); L | Did not advance | | | |
| Coralie Demay | Women's sprint | 11.849; 60.765 | 29 | Did not advance | | | | | | | | | |

Team sprint

| Athlete | Event | Qualification | | Semifinals | | Final | |
| Athlete | Event | Time Speed (km/h) | Rank | Opposition Time Speed (km/h) | Rank | Opposition Time Speed (km/h) | Rank |
|---|---|---|---|---|---|---|---|
| Florian Grengbo; Rayan Helal; Sébastien Vigier | Men's team sprint | 42.722; 63.199 | 4 | New Zealand; W 42.294; 63.839 | 4 FB | Australia; W 42.331; 63.783 | 3rd place, bronze medalist(s) |

Pursuit

| Athlete | Event | Qualification | | Semifinals | | Final | |
| Athlete | Event | Time | Rank | Opponent Results | Rank | Opponent Results | Rank |
|---|---|---|---|---|---|---|---|
| Victoire Berteau; Marion Borras; Coralie Demay; Valentine Fortin; Marie Le Net | Women's team pursuit | 4:12.502 | 5 | Canada; L 4:11.888 | 8 FD | New Zealand; W 4:10.600 | 7 |

Keirin

| Athlete | Event | Round 1 | Repechage | Quarterfinals | Semifinals | Final |
| Athlete | Event | Rank | Rank | Rank | Rank | Rank |
|---|---|---|---|---|---|---|
| Rayan Helal | Men's keirin | 1 QF | Bye | 3 SF | 4 | 10 |
| Sébastien Vigier | Men's keirin | 6 R | 3 | Did not advance | | |
| Coralie Demay | Women's keirin | 5 R | 4 | Did not advance | | |
| Mathilde Gros | Women's keirin | 6 R | 2 QF | 5 | Did not advance | |

Omnium

| Athlete | Event | Scratch race | | Tempo race | | Elimination race | | Points race | | Total points | Rank |
| Athlete | Event | Rank | Points | Rank | Points | Rank | Points | Rank | Points | Total points | Rank |
|---|---|---|---|---|---|---|---|---|---|---|---|
| Benjamin Thomas | Men's omnium | 2 | 38 | 2 | 38 | 6 | 30 | 10 | 12 | 118 | 4 |
| Clara Copponi | Women's omnium | DNF | 16 | 9 | 24 | 1 | 40 | 7 | 5 | 85 | 8 |

Madison

| Athlete | Event | Points | Laps | Rank |
|---|---|---|---|---|
| Donavan Grondin; Benjamin Thomas | Men's madison | 40 | 0 | 3rd place, bronze medalist(s) |
| Clara Copponi; Marie Le Net | Women's madison | 19 | 0 | 5 |

=== Mountain biking ===
French mountain bikers qualified for two men's and two women's quota places into the Olympic cross-country race, as a result of the nation's third-place finish for men and fifth for women, respectively, in the UCI Olympic Ranking List of 16 May 2021. The mountain biking team was named as part of the nation's tenth batch of nominated athletes on 26 May 2021, with Pauline Ferrand-Prévot leading the bikers to her third consecutive Games.

| Athlete | Event | Time | Rank |
|---|---|---|---|
| Victor Koretzky | Men's cross-country | 1:26.00 | 5 |
| Jordan Sarrou | Men's cross-country | 1:26.50 | 9 |
| Pauline Ferrand-Prévot | Women's cross-country | 1:20.18 | 10 |
| Loana Lecomte | Women's cross-country | 1:18.43 | 6 |

=== BMX ===
France received a total of seven quota spots (four men's and three women's) for BMX at the Olympics, as a result of the nation's top-place finish for men's race, third for women's race, and fifth for men's freestyle in the UCI Olympic Ranking List of 1 June 2021; and the nation's top-two placement at the 2019 UCI Urban Cycling World Championships in Chengdu, China.

The BMX squad was named as part of the nation's eleventh batch of nominated athletes on 8 June 2021, with Joris Daudet leading the riders to his third consecutive Games.

Race

| Athlete | Event | Quarterfinal | | Semifinal | | Final | |
| Athlete | Event | Points | Rank | Points | Rank | Result | Rank |
|---|---|---|---|---|---|---|---|
| Sylvain André | Men's race | 3 | 1 Q | 11 | 3 Q | 40.676 | 4 |
| Joris Daudet | Men's race | 3 | 1 Q | 8 | 3 Q | DNF | |
| Romain Mahieu | Men's race | 10 | 3 Q | 4 | 1 Q | 41.952 | 6 |
| Axelle Étienne | Women's race | 9 | 3 Q | 11 | 3 Q | 45.853 | 7 |
| Manon Valentino | Women's race | 15 | 5 | Did not advance | | | |

Freestyle

| Athlete | Event | Seeding | | Final | |
| Athlete | Event | Score | Rank | Score | Rank |
|---|---|---|---|---|---|
| Anthony Jeanjean | Men's freestyle | 84.65 | 4 | 78.20 | 7 |

== Diving ==
French divers qualified for three individual spots at the Games by finishing in the top twelve of their respective events at the 2021 FINA Diving World Cup.

| Athlete | Event | Preliminary | | Semifinal | | Final | |
| Athlete | Event | Points | Rank | Points | Rank | Points | Rank |
|---|---|---|---|---|---|---|---|
| Alexis Jandard | Men's 3 m springboard | 423.60 | 11 Q | 357.85 | 16 | Did not advance | |
| Matthieu Rosset | Men's 10 m platform | 275.70 | 29 | Did not advance | | | |
| Alaïs Kalonji | Women's 10 m platform | 295.90 | 14 Q | 269.00 | 16 | Did not advance | |

== Equestrian ==
French equestrians qualified a full squad each in the team eventing and jumping competition, respectively, by virtue of a top-six finish at the 2018 FEI World Equestrian Games in Tryon, North Carolina, United States and a top-three finish at the 2019 FEI European Championships in Rotterdam, Netherlands. Meanwhile, a composite squad of three dressage riders was formed and thereby added to the French roster by receiving a spare berth freed up by one of two nations (South Africa and Brazil), unable to fulfill the NOC Certificate of Capability, based on their individual results in the FEI Olympic rankings at the end of 2019 season.

The French equestrian squads were named on 2 July 2021.

=== Dressage ===
Isabelle Pinto and Hot Chocolat VD Kwaplas have been named the travelling alternates.

| Athlete | Horse | Event | Grand Prix | | Grand Prix Special | | Grand Prix Freestyle | | Overall | |
| Athlete | Horse | Event | Score | Rank | Score | Rank | Technical | Artistic | Score | Rank |
|---|---|---|---|---|---|---|---|---|---|---|
| Alexandre Ayache | Zo What | Individual | 68.929 | 34 | —N/a | | Did not advance | | | |
| Morgan Barbançon | Sir Donnerhall II | Individual | 70.543 | 24 | —N/a | | Did not advance | | | |
| Maxime Collard | Cupido | Individual | 69.068 | 33 | —N/a | | Did not advance | | | |
| Alexandre Ayache; Morgan Barbançon; Maxime Collard | See above | Team | 6715.0 | 9 | Did not advance | | —N/a | | Did not advance | |

Qualification Legend: Q = Qualified for the final; q = Qualified for the final as a lucky loser

=== Eventing ===
Karim Laghouag and Triton Fontaine were named as the travelling alternates and replaced Thomas Carlile and Birmane who withdrew.

| Athlete | Horse | Event | Dressage | | Cross-country | | | Jumping | | | | | | Total | |
| Athlete | Horse | Event | Dressage | | Cross-country | | | Qualifier | | | Final | | | Total | |
| Athlete | Horse | Event | Penalties | Rank | Penalties | Total | Rank | Penalties | Total | Rank | Penalties | Total | Rank | Penalties | Rank |
|---|---|---|---|---|---|---|---|---|---|---|---|---|---|---|---|
| Karim Laghouag | Triton Fontaine | Individual | 32.40 | 26 | 0.00 | 32.40 | 8 | 4.00 | 36.40 | 13 | 8.80 | 45.20 | 12 | 45.20 | 12 |
| Christopher Six | Totem de Brecey | Individual | 29.60 | 13 | 1.60 | 31.20 | 11 | 0.00 | 31.20 | 6 | 4.00 | 35.20 | 7 | 35.20 | 7 |
| Nicolas Touzaint | Absolut Gold | Individual | 33.10 | 32 | 0.40 | 33.50 | 13 | 0.40 | 33.90 | 10 | 0.00 | 33.90 | 6 | 33.90 | 6 |
| Karim Laghouag; Christopher Six; Nicolas Touzaint | See above | Team | 95.10 | 9 | 2.00 | 97.10 | 3 | 4.40 | 101.50 | 3 | —N/a | | | 101.50 | 3rd place, bronze medalist(s) |

=== Jumping ===
| Athlete | Horse | Event | Qualification | | Final | | |
| Athlete | Horse | Event | Penalties | Rank | Penalties | Time | Rank |
|---|---|---|---|---|---|---|---|
| Mathieu Billot | Quel Filou | Individual | 7 | 43 | Did not advance | | |
| Nicolas Delmotte | Urvoso du Roch | Individual | 0 | =1 Q | 5 | 88.04 | 12 |
| Pénélope Leprevost | Vancouver de Lanlore | Individual | 10 | =52 | Did not advance | | |
| Mathieu Billot; Simon Delestre; Pénélope Leprevost | Quel Filou; Berlux Z Vancouver de Lanlore | Team | 15 | 6 Q | 2+EL | 168.46 | 8 |

== Fencing ==
French fencers qualified a full squad each in the men's and women's team foil, men's team épée, and women's team sabre at the Games, by finishing among the top four nations in the FIE Olympic Team Rankings. London 2012 Olympian Boladé Apithy (men's sabre) and rookie Coraline Vitalis (women's épée) secured additional places on the French team as one of the two highest-ranked fencers vying for individual qualification from Europe in the FIE Adjusted Official Rankings.

Daniel Jérent initially qualified to fence in the individual and team epee events, but was banned from participating due to a positive urine test for a banned product. Jérent was replaced by Romain Cannone, who went on to win the gold medal in individual epee. Ronan Gustin was recalled to be a team replacement.

Men

| Athlete | Event | Round of 64 | Round of 32 | Round of 16 | Quarterfinal | Semifinal | Final / BM | |
| Athlete | Event | Opposition Score | Opposition Score | Opposition Score | Opposition Score | Opposition Score | Opposition Score | Rank |
|---|---|---|---|---|---|---|---|---|
| Alexandre Bardenet | Épée | Bye | McDowald (USA); W 15–12 | Santarelli (ITA); L 11–15 | Did not advance | | | |
| Yannick Borel | Épée | Bye | El-Sayed (EGY); L 11–15 | Did not advance | | | | |
| Romain Cannone | Épée | Bye | Limardo (VEN); W 15–12 | Verwijlen (NED); W 15–11 | Bida (ROC); W 15–12 | Reizlin (UKR); W 15–10 | Siklósi (HUN); W 15–10 | 1st place, gold medalist(s) |
| Alexandre Bardenet; Yannick Borel; Romain Cannone; Ronan Gustin | Team épée | —N/a | | Bye | Japan; L 44–45 | Classification semifinal Switzerland; W 45–37 | Fifth place match Ukraine; W 45–39 | 5 |
| Enzo Lefort | Foil | Bye | Cervantes (MEX); W 15–11 | Saito (JPN); W 15–4 | Garozzo (ITA); L 10–15 | Did not advance | | |
| Julien Mertine | Foil | Bye | Cheung K-l (HKG); L 12–15 | Did not advance | | | | |
| Maxime Pauty | Foil | Bye | Matsuyama (JPN); L 7–15 | Did not advance | | | | |
| Erwann Le Péchoux; Enzo Lefort; Julien Mertine; Maxime Pauty | Team foil | —N/a | | Bye | Egypt; W 45–34 | Japan; W 45–42 | ROC; W 45–28 | 1st place, gold medalist(s) |
| Boladé Apithy | Sabre | Bye | Rahbari (IRI); L 13–15 | Did not advance | | | | |

Women

| Athlete | Event | Round of 64 | Round of 32 | Round of 16 | Quarterfinal | Semifinal | Final / BM | |
| Athlete | Event | Opposition Score | Opposition Score | Opposition Score | Opposition Score | Opposition Score | Opposition Score | Rank |
|---|---|---|---|---|---|---|---|---|
| Coraline Vitalis | Épée | Bye | Beljajeva (EST); L 5–15 | Did not advance | | | | |
| Anita Blaze | Foil | Bye | Guo (CAN); L 12–15 | Did not advance | | | | |
| Pauline Ranvier | Foil | Bye | Harvey (CAN); L 9–15 | Did not advance | | | | |
| Ysaora Thibus | Foil | Bye | Pásztor (HUN); W 15–13 | Korobeynikova (ROC); L 12–15 | Did not advance | | | |
| Anita Blaze; Astrid Guyart; Pauline Ranvier; Ysaora Thibus | Team foil | —N/a | | | Canada; W 45–29 | Italy; W 45–43 | ROC; L 34–45 | 2nd place, silver medalist(s) |
| Cécilia Berder | Sabre | Bye | Choi S-y (KOR); L 11–15 | Did not advance | | | | |
| Manon Brunet | Sabre | Bye | Bhavani Devi (IND); W 15–7 | Emura (JPN); W 15–12 | Nikitina (ROC); W 15–5 | Pozdniakova (ROC); L 10–15 | Márton (HUN); W 15–6 | 3rd place, bronze medalist(s) |
| Charlotte Lembach | Sabre | Bye | Vecchi (ITA); L 11–15 | Did not advance | | | | |
| Sara Balzer; Cécilia Berder; Manon Brunet; Charlotte Lembach | Team sabre | —N/a | | Bye | United States; W 45–30 | Italy; W 45–39 | ROC; L 41–45 | 2nd place, silver medalist(s) |

== Football ==
Summary

Key:

- A.E.T – After extra time.
- P – Match decided by penalty-shootout.

| Team | Event | Group Stage | | | | Quarterfinal | Semifinal | Final / BM | |
| Team | Event | Opposition Score | Opposition Score | Opposition Score | Rank | Opposition Score | Opposition Score | Opposition Score | Rank |
|---|---|---|---|---|---|---|---|---|---|
| France men's | Men's tournament | Mexico; L 1–4 | South Africa; W 4–3 | Japan; L 0–4 | 3 | Did not advance | | | |

=== Men's tournament ===
France men's football team qualified for the Games by advancing to the semifinal stage of the 2019 UEFA European Under-21 Championship in Italy, signifying the country's recurrence to the Olympic tournament after twenty-four years.

Team roster

France's initial final squad was announced on 25 June 2021. However, after several clubs refused to release their players, a new squad was announced on 2 July 2021, along with additional players to complete the final roster. Before the start of the tournament, Niels Nkounkou was called up to replace the injured Jérémy Gelin.

Head coach: Sylvain Ripoll

| No. | Pos. | Player | Date of birth (age) | Club |
|---|---|---|---|---|
| 1 | GK | Paul Bernardoni | 18 April 1997 (aged 24) | (French Football Federation) Angers |
| 2 | DF | Pierre Kalulu | 5 June 2000 (aged 21) | (Italian Football Federation) Milan |
| 3 | DF | Melvin Bard | 6 November 2000 (aged 20) | (French Football Federation) Lyon |
| 4 | DF | Timothée Pembélé | 9 September 2002 (aged 18) | (French Football Federation) Paris Saint-Germain |
| 5 | DF | Niels Nkounkou | 1 November 2000 (aged 20) | (The Football Association) Everton |
| 6 | MF | Lucas Tousart | 29 April 1997 (aged 24) | (German Football Association) Hertha BSC |
| 7 | FW | Arnaud Nordin | 17 June 1998 (aged 23) | (French Football Federation) Saint-Étienne |
| 8 | MF | Enzo Le Fée | 3 February 2000 (aged 21) | (French Football Federation) Lorient |
| 9 | FW | Nathanaël Mbuku | 16 March 2002 (aged 19) | (French Football Federation) Reims |
| 10 | FW | André-Pierre Gignac* (captain) | 5 December 1985 (aged 35) | (Mexican Football Federation) Tigres UANL |
| 11 | MF | Téji Savanier* | 22 December 1991 (aged 29) | (French Football Federation) Montpellier |
| 12 | MF | Alexis Beka Beka | 29 March 2001 (aged 20) | (French Football Federation) Caen |
| 13 | DF | Clément Michelin | 11 May 1997 (aged 24) | (French Football Federation) Lens |
| 14 | FW | Florian Thauvin* | 26 January 1993 (aged 28) | (French Football Federation) Marseille |
| 15 | DF | Modibo Sagnan | 14 April 1999 (aged 22) | (Royal Spanish Football Federation) Real Sociedad |
| 16 | GK | Stefan Bajic | 23 December 2001 (aged 19) | (French Football Federation) Saint-Étienne |
| 17 | DF | Anthony Caci | 1 July 1997 (aged 24) | (French Football Federation) Strasbourg |
| 18 | FW | Randal Kolo Muani | 5 December 1998 (aged 22) | (French Football Federation) Nantes |
| 19 | DF | Ismaël Doukouré | 24 July 2003 (aged 17) | (French Football Federation) Valenciennes |
| 20 | FW | Isaac Lihadji | 4 April 2002 (aged 19) | (French Football Federation) Lille |
| 22 | GK | Dimitry Bertaud | 6 June 1998 (aged 23) | (French Football Federation) Montpellier |

* Overage player.

Group play

| Pos | Team | Pld | W | D | L | GF | GA | GD | Pts | Qualification |
|---|---|---|---|---|---|---|---|---|---|---|
| 1 | Japan (H) | 3 | 3 | 0 | 0 | 7 | 1 | +6 | 9 | Advance to knockout stage |
| 2 | Mexico | 3 | 2 | 0 | 1 | 8 | 3 | +5 | 6 | Advance to knockout stage |
| 3 | France | 3 | 1 | 0 | 2 | 5 | 11 | −6 | 3 | |
| 4 | South Africa | 3 | 0 | 0 | 3 | 3 | 8 | −5 | 0 | |

Source: TOCOG and FIFA
Rules for classification: Group stage tiebreakers
(H) Hosts
22 July 2021
17:00

| Mexico | 4–1 | France |
|---|---|---|
| Vega 47'; Córdova 55'; Antuna 80'; Aguirre 90+1' | Report (TOCOG); Report (FIFA) | Gignac 69' (pen.) |

Tokyo Stadium, Chōfu
Referee: Chris Beath (Australia)

25 July 2021
17:00

| France | 4–3 | South Africa |
|---|---|---|
| Gignac 57', 78', 86' (pen.); Savanier 90+2' | Report (TOCOG); Report (FIFA) | Kodisang 53'; Makgopa 73'; Mokoena 82' |

Saitama Stadium 2002, Saitama
Referee: Kevin Ortega (Peru)

28 July 2021
20:30

| France | 0–4 | Japan |
|---|---|---|
| | Report (TOCOG); Report (FIFA) | Kubo 27'; Sakai 34'; Miyoshi 70'; Maeda 90+1' |

International Stadium Yokohama, Yokohama
Referee: Iván Barton (El Salvador)

== Golf ==
France entered two male and two female golfers into the Olympic tournament. Victor Perez qualified but chose not to play.

| Athlete | Event | Round 1 | Round 2 | Round 3 | Round 4 | Total | | |
| Athlete | Event | Score | Score | Score | Score | Score | Par | Rank |
|---|---|---|---|---|---|---|---|---|
| Romain Langasque | Men's | 69 | 70 | 69 | 69 | 277 | −7 | =35 |
| Antoine Rozner | Men's | 68 | 69 | 73 | 70 | 280 | −4 | =45 |
| Céline Boutier | Women's | 73 | 68 | 72 | 69 | 282 | −2 | =34 |
| Perrine Delacour | Women's | 70 | 70 | 69 | 71 | 280 | −4 | =29 |

== Gymnastics ==
=== Artistic ===
France fielded a full squad of seven artistic gymnasts (three men and four women) into the Olympic competition, failing to send the men's all-around team for the first time since 1992. The women's squad topped the list of nine nations eligible for qualification in the team all-around to assure its Olympic berth at the 2019 World Artistic Gymnastics Championships in Stuttgart, Germany. On the men's side, two-time Olympian Cyril Tommasone, his Rio 2016 teammate Samir Aït Saïd, and rookie Loris Frasca booked their spots in the individual all-around and apparatus events at the same tournament, with Tommasone finishing sixth in the pommel horse final and Aït Saïd capturing the bronze in the rings.

Men

| Athlete | Event | Qualification | | | | | | | | Final | | | | | | | |
| Athlete | Event | Apparatus | | | | | | Total | Rank | Apparatus | | | | | | Total | Rank |
| Athlete | Event | F | PH | R | V | PB | HB | Total | Rank | F | PH | R | V | PB | HB | Total | Rank |
|---|---|---|---|---|---|---|---|---|---|---|---|---|---|---|---|---|---|
| Samir Aït Saïd | Rings | —N/a | | 15.066 | —N/a | | | 15.066 | 3 Q | —N/a | | 14.900 | —N/a | | | 14.900 | 4 |
| Loris Frasca | All-around | 13.700 | 13.766 | 13.100 | 13.366 | 13.433 | 12.833 | 80.332 | 44 | Did not advance | | | | | | | |
| Cyril Tommasone | Pommel horse | —N/a | 13.100 | —N/a | | | | 13.100 | 43 | Did not advance | | | | | | | |

Women
Team

| Athlete | Event | Qualification | | | | | | Final | | | | | |
| Athlete | Event | Apparatus | | | | Total | Rank | Apparatus | | | | Total | Rank |
| Athlete | Event | V | UB | BB | F | Total | Rank | V | UB | BB | F | Total | Rank |
|---|---|---|---|---|---|---|---|---|---|---|---|---|---|
| Marine Boyer | Team | ~~13.733~~ | ~~10.400~~ | 13.466 | 12.733 | 50.332 | 60 | —N/a | | 12.066 | 13.000 | —N/a | |
| Mélanie de Jesus dos Santos | Team | 14.466 | 14.566 | 13.233 | 13.166 | 55.431 | 10 Q | 14.500 | 14.200 | 13.566 | 13.700 | —N/a | |
| Aline Friess | Team | 14.966 | 13.666 | ~~12.500~~ | ~~12.500~~ | 53.632 | 25 | 14.900 | 13.733 | —N/a | | —N/a | |
| Carolann Héduit | Team | 14.233 | 13.966 | 13.200 | 12.900 | 54.299 | 18 Q | 14.200 | 13.466 | 12.833 | 13.100 | —N/a | |
| Total | Team | 43.665 | 42.198 | 39.899 | 38.799 | 164.561 | 4 Q | 43.600 | 41.399 | 38.465 | 39.800 | 163.264 | 6 |

Individual finals

| Athlete | Event | Qualification | | | | | | Final | | | | | |
| Athlete | Event | Apparatus | | | | Total | Rank | Apparatus | | | | Total | Rank |
| Athlete | Event | V | UB | BB | F | Total | Rank | V | UB | BB | F | Total | Rank |
|---|---|---|---|---|---|---|---|---|---|---|---|---|---|
| Mélanie de Jesus dos Santos | All-around | See team results | | | | | | 14.366 | 13.833 | 12.166 | 13.333 | 53.698 | 11 |
| Carolann Héduit | All-around | See team results | | | | | | 14.400 | 13.566 | 12.566 | 13.033 | 53.565 | 12 |

=== Trampoline ===
France qualified one gymnast each for the men's and women's trampoline by finishing in the top eight, respectively, at the 2019 World Championships in Tokyo, Japan. The athletes were announced on 16 June 2021.

| Athlete | Event | Qualification | | Final | |
| Athlete | Event | Score | Rank | Score | Rank |
|---|---|---|---|---|---|
| Allan Morante | Men's | 21.080 | 16 | Did not advance | |
| Léa Labrousse | Women's | 68.085 | 12 | Did not advance | |

== Handball ==
Summary

Key:

- ET: After extra time
- P – Match decided by penalty-shootout.

| Team | Event | Group Stage | | | | | | Quarterfinal | Semifinal | Final / BM | |
| Team | Event | Opposition Score | Opposition Score | Opposition Score | Opposition Score | Opposition Score | Rank | Opposition Score | Opposition Score | Opposition Score | Rank |
|---|---|---|---|---|---|---|---|---|---|---|---|
| France men's | Men's tournament | Argentina; W 33–27 | Brazil; W 34–29 | Germany; W 30–29 | Spain; W 36–31 | Norway; L 29–32 | 1 Q | Bahrain; W 42–28 | Egypt; W 27–23 | Denmark; W 25–23 | 1st place, gold medalist(s) |
| France women's | Women's tournament | Hungary; W 30–29 | Spain; L 25–28 | Sweden; T 28–28 | ROC; L 27–28 | Brazil; W 29–22 | 3 Q | Netherlands; W 32–22 | Sweden; W 29–27 | ROC; W 30–25 | 1st place, gold medalist(s) |

=== Men's tournament ===
France men's national handball team qualified for the Olympics by securing a top-two finish at the Montpellier leg of the 2020 IHF Olympic Qualification Tournament.

Team roster

The squad was announced on 5 July 2021. On 2 August, Timothey N'Guessan was replaced by Romain Lagarde.

Head coach: Guillaume Gille

| No. | Pos. | Name | Date of birth (age) | Height | App. | Goals | Club |
|---|---|---|---|---|---|---|---|
| 5 | CB | Nedim Remili | 18 July 1995 (aged 26) | 1.95 m | 84 | 253 | (France) Paris Saint-Germain |
| 7 | LB | Romain Lagarde | 5 March 1997 (aged 24) | 1.94 m | 51 | 66 | (France) Pays d'Aix Université Club |
| 9 | RB | Melvyn Richardson | 31 January 1997 (aged 24) | 1.90 m | 33 | 72 | (Spain) FC Barcelona |
| 10 | RB | Dika Mem | 31 August 1997 (aged 23) | 1.94 m | 67 | 181 | (Spain) FC Barcelona |
| 11 | P | Nicolas Tournat | 5 April 1994 (aged 27) | 2.00 m | 47 | 66 | (Poland) Łomża Vive Kielce |
| 12 | GK | Vincent Gérard | 16 December 1986 (aged 34) | 1.89 m | 112 | 16 | (France) Paris Saint-Germain |
| 13 | LB | Nikola Karabatić | 11 April 1984 (aged 37) | 1.96 m | 313 | 1210 | (France) Paris Saint-Germain |
| 14 | CB | Kentin Mahé | 22 May 1991 (aged 30) | 1.86 m | 124 | 408 | (Hungary) Telekom Veszprém |
| 16 | GK | Yann Genty | 26 December 1981 (aged 39) | 1.85 m | 16 | 0 | (France) Paris Saint-Germain |
| 17 | LB | Timothey N'Guessan | 18 September 1992 (aged 28) | 1.96 m | 87 | 175 | (Spain) FC Barcelona |
| 19 | RW | Luc Abalo | 6 September 1984 (aged 36) | 1.82 m | 278 | 836 |
| 21 | LW | Michaël Guigou | 28 January 1982 (aged 39) | 1.80 m | 298 | 1001 | (France) USAM Nîmes Gard |
| 22 | P | Luka Karabatić | 19 April 1988 (aged 33) | 2.02 m | 112 | 131 | (France) Paris Saint-Germain |
| 23 | P | Ludovic Fabregas | 1 July 1996 (aged 25) | 1.98 m | 87 | 177 | (Spain) FC Barcelona |
| 25 | LW | Hugo Descat | 16 August 1992 (aged 28) | 1.82 m | 17 | 66 | (France) Montpellier Handball |
| 28 | RW | Valentin Porte | 7 September 1990 (aged 30) | 1.90 m | 140 | 342 | (France) Montpellier Handball |

Group play

| Pos | Team | Pld | W | D | L | GF | GA | GD | Pts | Qualification |
|---|---|---|---|---|---|---|---|---|---|---|
| 1 | France | 5 | 4 | 0 | 1 | 162 | 148 | +14 | 8 (Note: France 36–31 Spain) | Quarter-finals |
| 2 | Spain | 5 | 4 | 0 | 1 | 155 | 142 | +13 | 8 | Quarter-finals |
| 3 | Germany | 5 | 3 | 0 | 2 | 146 | 131 | +15 | 6 (Note: Germany 28–23 Norway) | Quarter-finals |
| 4 | Norway | 5 | 3 | 0 | 2 | 136 | 132 | +4 | 6 | Quarter-finals |
| 5 | Brazil | 5 | 1 | 0 | 4 | 128 | 145 | −17 | 2 | |
| 6 | Argentina | 5 | 0 | 0 | 5 | 125 | 154 | −29 | 0 | |

Source: Tokyo 2020 and IHF
Rules for classification: 1) Points; 2) Head-to-head points; 3) Head-to-head goal difference; 4) Head-to-head goals scored; 5) Goal difference; 6) Goals scored; 7) Draw.
Notes:

| 24 July 2021; 11:00 | France | 33–27 | Argentina | Yoyogi National Gymnasium, Tokyo; Referees: Belkhiri, Hamidi (ALG) |
| 24 July 2021; 11:00 | Richardson 7 | (12–10) | D. Simonet 8 | Yoyogi National Gymnasium, Tokyo; Referees: Belkhiri, Hamidi (ALG) |
| 24 July 2021; 11:00 | 1× (yellow card) 5× (suspension) | Report | 1× (yellow card) 4× (suspension) | Yoyogi National Gymnasium, Tokyo; Referees: Belkhiri, Hamidi (ALG) |

| 26 July 2021; 09:00 | Brazil | 29–34 | France | Yoyogi National Gymnasium, Tokyo; Referees: Kurtagic, Wetterwik (SWE) |
| 26 July 2021; 09:00 | Dutra 10 | (13–16) | three players 4 | Yoyogi National Gymnasium, Tokyo; Referees: Kurtagic, Wetterwik (SWE) |
| 26 July 2021; 09:00 | 4× (suspension) 1× (red card) | Report | 2× (suspension) | Yoyogi National Gymnasium, Tokyo; Referees: Kurtagic, Wetterwik (SWE) |

| 28 July 2021; 21:30 | France | 30–29 | Germany | Yoyogi National Gymnasium, Tokyo; Referees: Nachevski, Nikolov (MKD) |
| 28 July 2021; 21:30 | Mem 6 | (16–13) | Kastening 7 | Yoyogi National Gymnasium, Tokyo; Referees: Nachevski, Nikolov (MKD) |
| 28 July 2021; 21:30 | 1× (yellow card) | Report | 1× (yellow card) 1× (suspension) | Yoyogi National Gymnasium, Tokyo; Referees: Nachevski, Nikolov (MKD) |

| 30 July 2021; 14:15 | France | 36–31 | Spain | Yoyogi National Gymnasium, Tokyo; Referees: Horáček, Novotný (CZE) |
| 30 July 2021; 14:15 | Remili 9 | (18–12) | Dujshebaev, Gómez 5 | Yoyogi National Gymnasium, Tokyo; Referees: Horáček, Novotný (CZE) |
| 30 July 2021; 14:15 | 2× (yellow card) 3× (suspension) | Report | 1× (yellow card) 2× (suspension) | Yoyogi National Gymnasium, Tokyo; Referees: Horáček, Novotný (CZE) |

| 1 August 2021; 16:15 | Norway | 32–29 | France | Yoyogi National Gymnasium, Tokyo; Referees: Nachevski, Nikolov (MKD) |
| 1 August 2021; 16:15 | Sagosen 7 | (15–15) | Descat, N. Karabatić 5 | Yoyogi National Gymnasium, Tokyo; Referees: Nachevski, Nikolov (MKD) |
| 1 August 2021; 16:15 | 1× (yellow card) 1× (suspension) | Report | 1× (yellow card) 3× (suspension) | Yoyogi National Gymnasium, Tokyo; Referees: Nachevski, Nikolov (MKD) |

Quarterfinal

| 3 August 2021; 09:30 | France | 42–28 | Bahrain | Yoyogi National Gymnasium, Tokyo; Referees: Lah, Sok (SLO) |
| 3 August 2021; 09:30 | Mahé 9 | (21–14) | Al-Sayyad 5 | Yoyogi National Gymnasium, Tokyo; Referees: Lah, Sok (SLO) |
| 3 August 2021; 09:30 | 3× (suspension) | Report | 2× (yellow card) 5× (suspension) | Yoyogi National Gymnasium, Tokyo; Referees: Lah, Sok (SLO) |

Semifinal

| 5 August 2021; 17:00 | France | 27–23 | Egypt | Yoyogi National Gymnasium, Tokyo; Referees: Raluy, Sabroso (ESP) |
| 5 August 2021; 17:00 | Descat, Mem 5 | (13–13) | El-Ahmar, Omar 5 | Yoyogi National Gymnasium, Tokyo; Referees: Raluy, Sabroso (ESP) |
| 5 August 2021; 17:00 | 3× (yellow card) 3× (suspension) | Report | 1× (yellow card) 1× (suspension) | Yoyogi National Gymnasium, Tokyo; Referees: Raluy, Sabroso (ESP) |

Gold medal game

| 7 August 2021; 21:00 | France | 25–23 | Denmark | Yoyogi National Gymnasium, Tokyo; Referees: Nikolov, Nachevski (MKD) |
| 7 August 2021; 21:00 | Remili 5 | (14–10) | M. Hansen 9 | Yoyogi National Gymnasium, Tokyo; Referees: Nikolov, Nachevski (MKD) |
| 7 August 2021; 21:00 | 4× (suspension) | Report | 1× (yellow card) 1× (suspension) | Yoyogi National Gymnasium, Tokyo; Referees: Nikolov, Nachevski (MKD) |

=== Women's tournament ===
France women's national handball team qualified for the Olympics by winning the gold medal and securing an outright berth at the final match of the 2018 European Championships in Paris.

Team roster

The squad was announced on 5 July 2021. On 28 July, Alexandra Lacrabère was replaced by Océane Sercien-Ugolin.

Head coach: Olivier Krumbholz

| No. | Pos. | Name | Date of birth (age) | Height | App. | Goals | Club |
|---|---|---|---|---|---|---|---|
| 2 | CB | Méline Nocandy | 25 February 1998 (aged 23) | 1.75 m | 26 | 44 | (France) Metz HB |
| 3 | RW | Blandine Dancette | 14 February 1988 (aged 33) | 1.69 m | 110 | 145 | (France) Nantes Atlantique Handball |
| 4 | RW | Pauline Coatanea | 6 July 1993 (aged 28) | 1.65 m | 47 | 63 | (France) Brest Bretagne HB |
| 6 | LW | Chloé Valentini | 19 April 1995 (aged 26) | 1.65 m | 24 | 53 | (France) Metz HB |
| 7 | LB | Allison Pineau | 2 May 1989 (aged 32) | 1.81 m | 252 | 627 | (Slovenia) RK Krim |
| 8 | LW | Coralie Lassource | 1 September 1992 (aged 28) | 1.70 m | 28 | 28 | (France) Brest Bretagne HB |
| 10 | CB | Grâce Zaadi Deuna | 7 July 1993 (aged 28) | 1.71 m | 128 | 204 | (Russia) Rostov-Don |
| 12 | GK | Amandine Leynaud | 2 May 1986 (aged 35) | 1.78 m | 243 | 3 | (Hungary) Győri Audi ETO KC |
| 15 | LB | Kalidiatou Niakaté | 15 March 1995 (aged 26) | 1.77 m | 40 | 57 | (France) Brest Bretagne HB |
| 16 | GK | Cléopatre Darleux | 1 July 1989 (aged 32) | 1.76 m | 167 | 3 | (France) Brest Bretagne HB |
| 19 | RB | Océane Sercien-Ugolin | 15 December 1997 (aged 23) | 1.83 m | 22 | 35 | (Slovenia) RK Krim |
| 20 | RB | Laura Flippes | 13 December 1994 (aged 26) | 1.71 m | 78 | 137 | (France) Paris 92 |
| 24 | P | Béatrice Edwige | 3 October 1988 (aged 32) | 1.82 m | 116 | 78 | (Russia) Rostov-Don |
| 26 | P | Pauletta Foppa | 22 December 2000 (aged 20) | 1.77 m | 31 | 49 | (France) Brest Bretagne HB |
| 27 | LB | Estelle Nze Minko | 11 August 1991 (aged 29) | 1.78 m | 126 | 284 | (Hungary) Győri Audi ETO KC |
| 64 | RB | Alexandra Lacrabère | 27 April 1987 (aged 34) | 1.77 m | 251 | 828 | (France) Chambray Touraine |

Group play

| Pos | Team | Pld | W | D | L | GF | GA | GD | Pts | Qualification |
|---|---|---|---|---|---|---|---|---|---|---|
| 1 | Sweden | 5 | 3 | 1 | 1 | 152 | 133 | +19 | 7 (Note: Sweden 36–24 ROC) | Quarter-finals |
| 2 | ROC | 5 | 3 | 1 | 1 | 148 | 149 | −1 | 7 | Quarter-finals |
| 3 | France | 5 | 2 | 1 | 2 | 139 | 135 | +4 | 5 | Quarter-finals |
| 4 | Hungary | 5 | 2 | 0 | 3 | 142 | 149 | −7 | 4 (Note: Hungary 29–25 Spain) | Quarter-finals |
| 5 | Spain | 5 | 2 | 0 | 3 | 135 | 142 | −7 | 4 | |
| 6 | Brazil | 5 | 1 | 1 | 3 | 133 | 141 | −8 | 3 | |

Source: Tokyo 2020 and IHF
Rules for classification: 1) Points; 2) Head-to-head points; 3) Head-to-head goal difference; 4) Head-to-head goals scored; 5) Goal difference; 6) Goals scored; 7) Draw.
Notes:

| 25 July 2021; 21:30 | Hungary | 29–30 | France | Yoyogi National Gymnasium, Tokyo; Referees: Hansen, Madsen (DEN) |
| 25 July 2021; 21:30 | Vámos 7 | (12–15) | Zaadi 10 | Yoyogi National Gymnasium, Tokyo; Referees: Hansen, Madsen (DEN) |
| 25 July 2021; 21:30 | 3× (suspension) | Report | 1× (yellow card) 4× (suspension) | Yoyogi National Gymnasium, Tokyo; Referees: Hansen, Madsen (DEN) |

| 27 July 2021; 21:30 | France | 25–28 | Spain | Yoyogi National Gymnasium, Tokyo; Referees: Brunner, Salah (SUI) |
| 27 July 2021; 21:30 | Coatanea, Pineau 5 | (12–12) | Martín 6 | Yoyogi National Gymnasium, Tokyo; Referees: Brunner, Salah (SUI) |
| 27 July 2021; 21:30 | 2× (yellow card) 3× (suspension) | Report | 2× (yellow card) 5× (suspension) | Yoyogi National Gymnasium, Tokyo; Referees: Brunner, Salah (SUI) |

| 29 July 2021; 21:30 | Sweden | 28–28 | France | Yoyogi National Gymnasium, Tokyo; Referees: Fonseca, Santos (POR) |
| 29 July 2021; 21:30 | Strömberg 7 | (16–17) | Foppa 6 | Yoyogi National Gymnasium, Tokyo; Referees: Fonseca, Santos (POR) |
| 29 July 2021; 21:30 | 1× (yellow card) 3× (suspension) | Report | 1× (yellow card) 4× (suspension) | Yoyogi National Gymnasium, Tokyo; Referees: Fonseca, Santos (POR) |

| 31 July 2021; 14:15 | ROC | 28–27 | France | Yoyogi National Gymnasium, Tokyo; Referees: Hansen, Madsen (DEN) |
| 31 July 2021; 14:15 | Ilyina 9 | (15–17) | Pineau 9 | Yoyogi National Gymnasium, Tokyo; Referees: Hansen, Madsen (DEN) |
| 31 July 2021; 14:15 | 2× (yellow card) 1× (suspension) | Report | 1× (yellow card) 2× (suspension) | Yoyogi National Gymnasium, Tokyo; Referees: Hansen, Madsen (DEN) |

| 2 August 2021; 11:00 | France | 29–22 | Brazil | Yoyogi National Gymnasium, Tokyo; Referees: Lah, Sok (SLO) |
| 2 August 2021; 11:00 | Lassource, Pineau 4 | (17–11) | Do Nascimento 6 | Yoyogi National Gymnasium, Tokyo; Referees: Lah, Sok (SLO) |
| 2 August 2021; 11:00 | 2× (suspension) | Report | 2× (suspension) | Yoyogi National Gymnasium, Tokyo; Referees: Lah, Sok (SLO) |

Quarterfinal

| 4 August 2021; 20:45 | France | 32–22 | Netherlands | Yoyogi National Gymnasium, Tokyo; Referees: Hansen, Madsen (DEN) |
| 4 August 2021; 20:45 | Flippes 6 | (19–11) | Malestein 5 | Yoyogi National Gymnasium, Tokyo; Referees: Hansen, Madsen (DEN) |
| 4 August 2021; 20:45 | 1× (suspension) | Report | 4× (suspension) | Yoyogi National Gymnasium, Tokyo; Referees: Hansen, Madsen (DEN) |

Semifinal

| 6 August 2021; 17:00 | France | 29–27 | Sweden | Yoyogi National Gymnasium, Tokyo; Referees: Lah, Sok (SLO) |
| 6 August 2021; 17:00 | Zaadi 7 | (15–14) | Carlson, Westberg 6 | Yoyogi National Gymnasium, Tokyo; Referees: Lah, Sok (SLO) |
| 6 August 2021; 17:00 | 1× (yellow card) 6× (suspension) | Report | 1× (yellow card) 4× (suspension) 1× (red card) | Yoyogi National Gymnasium, Tokyo; Referees: Lah, Sok (SLO) |

Gold medal game

| 8 August 2021; 15:00 | ROC | 25–30 | France | Yoyogi National Gymnasium, Tokyo; Referees: Lah, Sok (SLO) |
| 8 August 2021; 15:00 | Vedekhina 7 | (13–15) | Foppa, Pineau 7 | Yoyogi National Gymnasium, Tokyo; Referees: Lah, Sok (SLO) |
| 8 August 2021; 15:00 | 1× (yellow card) 5× (suspension) | Report | 1× (yellow card) 5× (suspension) | Yoyogi National Gymnasium, Tokyo; Referees: Lah, Sok (SLO) |

== Judo ==
Men

| Athlete | Event | Round of 64 | Round of 32 | Round of 16 | Quarterfinals | Semifinals | Repechage | Final / BM | |
| Athlete | Event | Opposition Result | Opposition Result | Opposition Result | Opposition Result | Opposition Result | Opposition Result | Opposition Result | Rank |
|---|---|---|---|---|---|---|---|---|---|
| Luka Mkheidze | −60 kg | —N/a | Bye | Garrigos (ESP); W 10–00 | Lesiuk (UKR); W 10–00 | Yang Y-w (TPE); L 00–10 | Bye | Kim W-j (KOR); W 10–00 | 3rd place, bronze medalist(s) |
| Kilian Le Blouch | −66 kg | —N/a | Alhassane (NIG); W 10–00 | H Abe (JPN); L 00–10 | Did not advance | | | | |
| Guillaume Chaine | −73 kg | Barbosa (BRA); W 10–00 | Shavdatuashvili (GEO); L 01–00 | Did not advance | | | | | |
| Axel Clerget | −90 kg | Bye | Ustopiriyon (TJK); W 10–00 | Van 't End (NED); L 00–01 | Did not advance | | | | |
| Alexandre Iddir | −100 kg | —N/a | Kotsoiev (AZE); L 00–01 | Did not advance | | | | | |
| Teddy Riner | +100 kg | —N/a | Hegyi (AUT); W 10–00 | Sasson (ISR); W 01–00 | Bashaev (ROC); L 00–01 | Did not advance | Silva (BRA); W 11–00 | Harasawa (JPN); W 10–00 | 3rd place, bronze medalist(s) |

Women

| Athlete | Event | Round of 32 | Round of 16 | Quarterfinals | Semifinals | Repechage | Final / BM | |
| Athlete | Event | Opposition Result | Opposition Result | Opposition Result | Opposition Result | Opposition Result | Opposition Result | Rank |
|---|---|---|---|---|---|---|---|---|
| Shirine Boukli | −48 kg | Nikolić (SRB); L 00–10 | Did not advance | | | | | |
| Amandine Buchard | −52 kg | Bye | Levytska-Shukvani (GEO); W 11–00 | Park D-s (KOR); W 10–00 | Kocher (SUI); W 10–00 | Bye | U Abe (JPN); L 00–10 | 2nd place, silver medalist(s) |
| Sarah-Léonie Cysique | −57 kg | Bye | Kim J-s (KOR); W 01–00 | Liparteliani (GEO); W 10–01 | Klimkait (CAN); W 10–00 | Bye | Gjakova (KOS); L 00–10 | 2nd place, silver medalist(s) |
| Clarisse Agbegnenou | −63 kg | Bye | Billiet (CPV); W 01–00 | Franssen (NED); W 01–00 | Beauchemin-Pinard (CAN); W 01–00 | Bye | Trstenjak (SLO); W 01–00 | 1st place, gold medalist(s) |
| Margaux Pinot | −70 kg | Bye | Teltsidou (GRE); L 00–10 | Did not advance | | | | |
| Madeleine Malonga | −78 kg | Bye | Graf (AUT); W 11–00 | Antomarchi (CUB); W 11–01 | Yoon H-j (KOR); W 10–00 | Bye | Hamada (JPN); L 00–10 | 2nd place, silver medalist(s) |
| Romane Dicko | +78 kg | Bye | Jablonskytė (LTU); W 10–00 | Altheman (BRA); W 11–00 | Ortiz (CUB); L 00–01 | Bye | Sayit (TUR); W 10–00 | 3rd place, bronze medalist(s) |

Mixed

| Athlete | Event | Round of 16 | Quarterfinals | Semifinals | Repechage | Final / BM | |
| Athlete | Event | Opposition Result | Opposition Result | Opposition Result | Opposition Result | Opposition Result | Rank |
|---|---|---|---|---|---|---|---|
| Amandine Buchard; Sarah-Léonie Cysique; Clarisse Agbegnenou; Margaux Pinot; Madeleine Malonga; Romane Dicko; Guillaume Chaine; Axel Clerget; Teddy Riner | Team | Bye | Israel; W 4–3 | Netherlands; W 4–0 | Bye | Japan; W 4–1 | 1st place, gold medalist(s) |

== Karate ==
France entered two karateka into the inaugural Olympic tournament. 2018 world champion Steven Da Costa qualified directly for the men's kumite 67-kg category by finishing among the top four karateka at the end of the combined WKF Olympic Rankings. Alexandra Feracci finished second in the final pool round to secure a spot in the women's kata at the World Olympic Qualification Tournament in Paris.

Kumite

| Athlete | Event | Group stage | | | | | Semifinals | Final | |
| Athlete | Event | Opposition Result | Opposition Result | Opposition Result | Opposition Result | Rank | Opposition Result | Opposition Result | Rank |
|---|---|---|---|---|---|---|---|---|---|
| Steven Da Costa | Men's −67 kg | Derafshipour (EOR); W 4–0 | Al-Masatfa (JOR); L 4–7 | Kalniņš (LAT); W 11–2 | Madera (VEN); W 2–0 | 2 Q | Assadilov (KAZ); W 5–2 | Şamdan (TUR); W 2–0 | 1st place, gold medalist(s) |
| Leïla Heurtault | Women's −61 kg | Garcés (VEN); L 0–8 | Someya (JPN); L 3–6 | Yin Xy (CHN); L 0–1 | Çoban (TUR); W 2–0 | 5 | Did not advance | | |

Kata

| Athlete | Event | Elimination round | | Ranking round | | Final / BM | |
| Athlete | Event | Score | Rank | Score | Rank | Opposition Result | Rank |
|---|---|---|---|---|---|---|---|
| Alexandra Feracci | Women's kata | 24.40 | 4 | Did not advance | | | |

== Modern pentathlon ==
French athletes qualified for the following spots in the modern pentathlon at the Games. Rio 2016 Olympian Valentin Prades and rookie Marie Oteiza confirmed places in their respective events with a top-ten finish (second for Prades and sixth for Oteiza among those eligible for Olympic qualification) at the 2019 European Championships in Bath, England. Less than a month later, Valentin Belaud was added to the French roster with a gold-medal victory at the 2019 UIPM World Championships in Budapest, Hungary.

| Athlete | Event | Fencing (épée one touch) | | | | Swimming (200 m freestyle) | | | Riding (show jumping) | | | Combined: shooting/running (10 m air pistol)/(3200 m) | | | Total points | Final rank |
| Athlete | Event | RR | BR | Rank | MP points | Time | Rank | MP points | Time | Rank | MP points | Time | Rank | MP Points | Total points | Final rank |
|---|---|---|---|---|---|---|---|---|---|---|---|---|---|---|---|---|
| Valentin Belaud | Men's | 18–17 | 4 | 13 | 212 | 2:04.13 | 23 | 302 | 78.16 | 9 | 293 | 11:05.74 | 9 | 635 | 1442 | 11 |
| Valentin Prades | Men's | 19–16 | 3 | 11 | 217 | 2:00.73 | 13 | 309 | 82.05 | 26 | 270 | 10:38.89 | 3 | 662 | 1458 | 7 |
| Élodie Clouvel | Women's | 16–19 | 0 | 24 | 196 | 2:07.51 | 3 | 295 | 74.08 | 12 | 293 | 12:17.78 | 10 | 563 | 1347 | 6 |
| Marie Oteiza | Women's | 19–16 | 1 | 13 | 215 | 2:10.15 | 7 | 290 | 87.70 | 13 | 293 | 12:44.75 | 19 | 536 | 1344 | 10 |

== Rowing ==
France qualified five boats for each of the following rowing classes into the Olympic regatta, with the majority of crews confirming Olympic places for their boats at the 2019 FISA World Championships in Ottensheim, Austria. Meanwhile, the women's quadruple sculls boat was awarded to the French roster with a top-two finish at the 2021 FISA Final Qualification Regatta in Lucerne, Switzerland.

On 8 June 2021, twelve rowers (eight men and four women) were officially selected to the French roster for the Games, including two-time Olympian Matthieu Androdias and his Rio 2016 partner Hugo Boucheron in the men's coxless pair.

Men

| Athlete | Event | Heats | | Repechage | | Semifinals | | Final | |
| Athlete | Event | Time | Rank | Time | Rank | Time | Rank | Time | Rank |
|---|---|---|---|---|---|---|---|---|---|
| Guillaume Turlan; Thibaud Turlan | Pair | 7:09.79 | 4 R | 6:49.19 | 2 SA/B | 6:52.24 | 6 FB | 6:28.01 | 9 |
| Matthieu Androdias; Hugo Boucheron | Double sculls | 6:10.45 | 1 SA/B | Bye | | 6:20.45 | 1 FA | 6:00.33 OR | 1st place, gold medalist(s) |

Women

| Athlete | Event | Heats | | Repechage | | Semifinals | | Final | |
| Athlete | Event | Time | Rank | Time | Rank | Time | Rank | Time | Rank |
|---|---|---|---|---|---|---|---|---|---|
| Hélène Lefebvre; Élodie Ravera-Scaramozzino | Double sculls | 6:57.83 | 3 SA/B | Bye | | 7:12.68 | 4 FB | 6:58.52 | 8 |
| Claire Bové; Laura Tarantola | Lightweight double sculls | 7:03.47 | 1 SA/B | Bye | | 6:42.92 | 2 FA | 6:47.68 | 2nd place, silver medalist(s) |
| Violaine Aernoudts; Margaux Bailleul; Marie Jacquet; Emma Lunatti | Quadruple sculls | 6:33.64 | 5 R | 6:47.41 | 5 FB | —N/a | | 6:29.70 | 9 |

Qualification Legend: FA=Final A (medal); FB=Final B (non-medal); FC=Final C (non-medal); FD=Final D (non-medal); FE=Final E (non-medal); FF=Final F (non-medal); SA/B=Semifinals A/B; SC/D=Semifinals C/D; SE/F=Semifinals E/F; QF=Quarterfinals; R=Repechage

== Rugby sevens ==
=== Women's tournament ===
France's women's national rugby sevens team qualified by securing a spot in the final repechage tournament on 20 June 2021.

Team roster

France's squad of 12 players was named on 5 July 2021. Additionally, Joanna Grisez was named as a replacement.

Head coach: Christophe Reigt

- Coralie Bertrand
- Anne-Cécile Ciofani
- Caroline Drouin
- Camille Grassineau
- Lina Guérin
- Fanny Horta
- Shannon Izar
- Chloé Jacquet
- Carla Neisen
- Séraphine Okemba
- Chloé Pelle
- Jade Ulutule

Group play

| Pos | Team | Pld | W | D | L | PF | PA | PD | Pts | Qualification |
|---|---|---|---|---|---|---|---|---|---|---|
| 1 | France | 3 | 3 | 0 | 0 | 83 | 10 | +73 | 9 | Quarter-finals |
| 2 | Fiji | 3 | 2 | 0 | 1 | 72 | 29 | +43 | 7 | Quarter-finals |
| 3 | Canada | 3 | 1 | 0 | 2 | 45 | 57 | −12 | 5 | |
| 4 | Brazil | 3 | 0 | 0 | 3 | 10 | 114 | −104 | 3 | |

Source: Tokyo 2020 and World Rugby
Rules for classification: 1) Points; 2) Head-to-head result; 3) Point difference; 4) Points scored.

29 July 2021
9:00

| France | 12–5 | Fiji |
| Try: Horta 7' c Okemba 9' m Con: Drouin (1/2) 7' | (Tokyo 2020) | Try: Riwai 3' m |

Tokyo Stadium, Tokyo

29 July 2021
17:00

| France | 40–5 | Brazil |
| Try: Ciofani (2) 2' c, 4' m Guérin (2) 6' c, 9' c Ulutule 11' c Grassineau 14' c Con: Ulutule (2/3) 3', 7'; Izar (3/3) 9', 11', 14' +1 | (Tokyo 2020) | Try: Silva 8' m Con: Kochhann (0/1) |

Tokyo Stadium, Tokyo

30 July 2021
9:30

| Canada | 0–31 | France |
| | (Tokyo 2020) | Try: Okemba 1' c Ciofani 4' m Ulutule 7' c Neisen 11' c Jacquet 14' m Con: Ulutule (2/2) 1', 7'; Izar (1/2) 11'; Drouin (0/1) |

Tokyo Stadium, Tokyo

Quarterfinal

30 July 2021
19:30 (Note: Matches were delayed by 30 minutes due to lightning in the area)

| France | 24–10 | China |
| Try: Okemba (2) 4' c, 10' m Drouin 6' m Ciofani 9' c Con: Ulutule (2/2) 4', 9'; Drouin (0/1); Izar (0/1) | (Tokyo 2020) | Try: Tang (2) 1' m, 12' m Con: Chen (0/2) |

Tokyo Stadium, Tokyo

Semifinal

31 July 2021
11:30

| Great Britain | 19–26 | France |
| Try: Joyce (2) 5' c, 7' m Smith 11' c Con: Aitchison (1/2) 6'; Hunt (1/1) 11' | (Tokyo 2020) | Try: Ciofani (2) 1' c, 8' m Okemba 3' c Bertrand 7' c Con: Drouin (2/3) 2', 3'; Ulutule (1/1) 7', 9' |

Tokyo Stadium, Tokyo

Final

31 July 2021
18:00

| New Zealand | 26–12 | France |
| Try: Blyde 1' c Broughton 5' m Fluhler 6' c Nathan-Wong 11' c Con: Nathan-Wong (3/4) 1', 7', 11' | (Tokyo 2020) | Try: Drouin 3' m Ciofani 8' c Con: Drouin (1/2) 9' |

Tokyo Stadium, Tokyo

== Sailing ==
French sailors qualified one boat in each of the following classes through the 2018 Sailing World Championships, the class-associated Worlds, and the continental regattas. Additionally, they received an unused berth from Oceania to send the women's 49erFX crew to the Games based on the results at the 2019 World Championships.

At the end of the 2019 season, the French Sailing Federation selected the first five sailors to compete at the Enoshima regatta, including the reigning Olympic windsurfing champion Charline Picon (women's RS:X) and Rio 2016 bronze medalist Camille Lecointre (women's 470). The 49er and Nacra 17 crews were named to the Olympic team on 7 January 2020, with New Caledonia native Thomas Goyard scoring a third-place finish at the Worlds two months later to lock the men's RS:X spot on the roster. Laser Radial sailor Marie Bolou, with Jean-Baptiste Bernaz making his fourth Olympic trip in the Laser class, joined Goyard as part of the fifth batch of nominated French athletes on 19 March 2020. The women's 49erFX crew (Dubois and Sebesi) completed the country's sailing lineup for the Games on 27 April 2021.

Men

| Athlete | Event | Race | | | | | | | | | | | | | Net points | Final rank |
| Athlete | Event | 1 | 2 | 3 | 4 | 5 | 6 | 7 | 8 | 9 | 10 | 11 | 12 | M* | Net points | Final rank |
|---|---|---|---|---|---|---|---|---|---|---|---|---|---|---|---|---|
| Thomas Goyard | RS:X | ~~13~~ | 5 | 3 | 13 | 1 | 1 | 3 | 6 | 7 | 1 | 9 | 3 | OCS | 74 | 2nd place, silver medalist(s) |
| Jean-Baptiste Bernaz | Laser | 1 | 9 | 13 | 9 | ~~23~~ | 7 | 16 | 4 | 9 | 22 | —N/a | | 2 | 92 | 6 |
| Jérémie Mion; Kevin Peponnet | 470 | 4 | 7 | 11 | ~~13~~ | 12 | 2 | 11 | 11 | 13 | 16 | —N/a | | EL | 87 | 11 |
| Émile Amoros; Lucas Rual | 49er | 15 | 9 | ~~16~~ | 15 | 8 | 13 | 11 | 15 | 10 | 12 | 16 | 10 | EL | 134 | 15 |

Women

| Athlete | Event | Race | | | | | | | | | | | | | Net points | Final rank |
| Athlete | Event | 1 | 2 | 3 | 4 | 5 | 6 | 7 | 8 | 9 | 10 | 11 | 12 | M* | Net points | Final rank |
|---|---|---|---|---|---|---|---|---|---|---|---|---|---|---|---|---|
| Charline Picon | RS:X | 1 | 6 | 2 | ~~9~~ | 1 | 4 | 2 | 3 | 6 | 3 | 2 | 6 | 2 | 38 | 2nd place, silver medalist(s) |
| Marie Bolou | Laser Radial | 28 | 27 | 5 | 15 | 7 | 2 | 16 | 14 | 7 | ~~33~~ | —N/a | | EL | 121 | 11 |
| Camille Lecointre; Aloïse Retornaz | 470 | 3 | 2 | 4 | 7 | 1 | ~~12~~ | 6 | 5 | 10 | 4 | —N/a | | 12 | 54 | 3rd place, bronze medalist(s) |
| Albane Dubois; Lili Sebesi | 49erFX | 4 | 15 | 10 | 6 | 8 | 2 | 7 | 14 | 13 | ~~18~~ | 14 | 2 | 16 | 111 | 9 |

Mixed

| Athlete | Event | Race | | | | | | | | | | | | | Net points | Final rank |
| Athlete | Event | 1 | 2 | 3 | 4 | 5 | 6 | 7 | 8 | 9 | 10 | 11 | 12 | M* | Net points | Final rank |
|---|---|---|---|---|---|---|---|---|---|---|---|---|---|---|---|---|
| Quentin Delapierre; Manon Audinet | Nacra 17 | ~~18~~ | 4 | 3 | 5 | 9 | 7 | 10 | 4 | 13 | 7 | 7 | 7 | 8 | 84 | 8 |

M = Medal race; EL = Eliminated – did not advance into the medal race

== Shooting ==
French shooters achieved quota places for the following events by virtue of their best finishes at the 2018 ISSF World Championships, the 2019 ISSF World Cup series, European Championships or Games, and European Qualifying Tournament, as long as they obtain a minimum qualifying score (MQS) by 31 May 2020.

On 19 March 2020, the French National Olympic and Sports Committee announced the first six shooters to compete at the Games, including Rio 2016 silver and 2018 world bronze medalist Jean Quiquampoix in the men's rapid fire pistol. Pistol shooter and London 2012 bronze medalist Celine Goberville, along with shotgun rookies Emmanuel Petit (men's skeet) and Mélanie Couzy (women's trap), joined as part of the sixth batch of nominated French athletes for Tokyo 2020 three months later.

Men

| Athlete | Event | Qualification | | Final | |
| Athlete | Event | Points | Rank | Points | Rank |
|---|---|---|---|---|---|
| Clément Bessaguet | 25 m rapid fire pistol | 582 | 7 | Did not advance | |
| Éric Delaunay | Skeet | 124 | 1 Q | 25 | 5 |
| Emmanuel Petit | Skeet | 121 | 11 | Did not advance | |
| Jean Quiquampoix | 25 m rapid fire pistol | 586 | 2 Q | 34 | 1st place, gold medalist(s) |

Women

| Athlete | Event | Qualification | | Final | |
| Athlete | Event | Points | Rank | Points | Rank |
|---|---|---|---|---|---|
| Lucie Anastassiou | Skeet | 119 | 9 | Did not advance | |
| Carole Cormenier | Trap | 117 | 12 | Did not advance | |
| Mélanie Couzy | Trap | 110 | 25 | Did not advance | |
| Céline Goberville | 10 m air pistol | 577 | 8 Q | 114.9 | 8 |
| Céline Goberville | 25 m pistol | 574 | 31 | Did not advance | |
| Mathilde Lamolle | 10 m air pistol | 578 | 5 Q | 134.6 | 7 |
| Mathilde Lamolle | 25 m pistol | 582 | 12 | Did not advance | |
| Océanne Muller | 10 m air rifle | 630.7 | 5 Q | 187.7 | 5 |
| Océanne Muller | 50 m rifle 3 positions | 1155 | 31 | Did not advance | |

== Skateboarding ==
France entered five skateboarders to compete across all events at the Games based on the World Skate Olympic Rankings of 30 June 2021: one entry each in the men's and women's park with the rest in the street (two men's and one women's). Madeleine Larcheron will be the youngest athlete in the French delegation at the Tokyo Olympic Games (15 years old)

| Athlete | Event | Qualification | | Final | |
| Athlete | Event | Points | Rank | Points | Rank |
|---|---|---|---|---|---|
| Vincent Matheron | Men's park | 74.07 | 7 Q | 42.33 | 7 |
| Aurélien Giraud | Men's street | 35.88 | 1 Q | 29.09 | 6 |
| Vincent Milou | Men's street | 34.36 | 5 Q | 34.14 | 4 |
| Madeleine Larcheron | Women's park | 32.34 | 13 | Did not advance | |
| Charlotte Hym | Women's street | 5.34 | 17 | Did not advance | |

== Sport climbing ==
France entered four sport climbers into the Olympic tournament. Mickaël Mawem qualified directly for the men's combined event, by advancing to the final and securing one of the seven provisional berths at the 2019 IFSC World Championships in Hachioji, Japan. Meanwhile, Mickäel's brother Bassa Mawem and Julia Chanourdie joined the French roster, by finishing in the top six of those eligible for qualification at the IFSC World Olympic Qualifying Event in Toulouse. The fourth and final slot was awarded to Anouck Jaubert, after accepting an unused berth, as the highest-ranked sport climber vying for qualification on the women's side, at the Worlds.

| Athlete | Event | Qualification | | | | | | | | | Final | | | | | | | | |
| Athlete | Event | Speed | | Boulder | | Lead | | | Total | Rank | Speed | | Boulder | | Lead | | | Total | Rank |
| Athlete | Event | Best | Place | Result | Place | Hold | Time | Place | Total | Rank | Best | Place | Result | Place | Hold | Time | Place | Total | Rank |
|---|---|---|---|---|---|---|---|---|---|---|---|---|---|---|---|---|---|---|---|
| Bassa Mawem | Men's | 5.45 OR | 1 | 0T1z 0 4 | 18 | 7 | — | 20 | 360.00 | 7 Q | DNS^{[a]} | 8 | DNS | 8 | DNS | — | 8 | 512 | 8 |
| Mickaël Mawem | Men's | 5.95 | 3 | 3T4z 4 5 | 1 | 28+ | 2:24 | 11 | 33.00 | 1 Q | 6.36 | 4 | 1T3z 1 3 | 2 | 23+ | — | 7 | 42 | 5 |
| Julia Chanourdie | Women's | 8.17 | 8 | 0T3z 0 9 | 15 | 25+ | — | 9 | 1080.00 | 13 | Did not advance | | | | | | | | |
| Anouck Jaubert | Women's | 7.12 | 2 | 1T1z 4 1 | 13 | 16+ | 2:14 | 15 | 390.00 | 8 Q | 7.40 | 2 | 0T1z 0 2 | 6 | 13+ | — | 7 | 84 | 6 |

a.Injured and could not compete.

== Surfing ==
France sent four surfers (two per gender) to compete in their respective shortboard races at the Games. Michel Bourez, Jérémy Florès, and Johanne Defay finished within the top ten (for men) and top eight (for women), respectively, of those eligible for qualification in the World Surf League rankings to secure their spots on the French roster for Tokyo 2020. Meanwhile, Pauline Ado completed the nation's surfing lineup by scoring a top-two finish within her heat at the 2021 ISA World Surfing Games in El Salvador.

| Athlete | Event | Round 1 | | Round 2 | | Round 3 | Quarterfinal | Semifinal | Final / BM | |
| Athlete | Event | Points | Rank | Points | Rank | Opposition Result | Opposition Result | Opposition Result | Opposition Result | Rank |
|---|---|---|---|---|---|---|---|---|---|---|
| Michel Bourez | Men's shortboard | 10.10 | 2 Q | Bye | | Boukhiam (MAR); W 12.43—9.40 | Medina (BRA); L 13.66—15.33 | Did not advance | | |
| Jérémy Florès | Men's shortboard | 7.63 | 4 q | 11.37 | 2 Q | Wright (AUS); L 12.90—15.00 | Did not advance | | | |
| Pauline Ado | Women's shortboard | 9.17 | 3 q | 9.66 | 2 Q | Fitzgibbons (AUS); L 9.03—10.86 | Did not advance | | | |
| Johanne Defay | Women's shortboard | 10.60 | 2 Q | Bye | | Hopkins (POR); L 9.40—10.84 | Did not advance | | | |

== Swimming ==
French swimmers further achieved qualifying standards in the following events (up to a maximum of two swimmers in each event at the Olympic Qualifying Time (OQT), and potentially one at the Olympic Selection Time (OST)): Swimmers must attain the federation's entry standards in one of two prerequisite Olympic qualification stages to assure their selection to the French roster: the 2020 French Winter Championships (10–13 December) in Saint-Raphael and the 2021 French Elite Championships & Olympic Trials (15–20 June) in Chartres.

Men

| Athlete | Event | Heat | | Semifinal | | Final | |
| Athlete | Event | Time | Rank | Time | Rank | Time | Rank |
|---|---|---|---|---|---|---|---|
| Jonathan Atsu | 200 m freestyle | 1:47.75 | 28 | Did not advance | | | |
| David Aubry | 400 m freestyle | 3:55.01 | 28 | —N/a | | Did not advance | |
| David Aubry | 800 m freestyle | 8:00.16 | 29 | —N/a | | Did not advance | |
| David Aubry | 10 km open water | —N/a | | | | DNF | |
| Théo Bussière | 100 m breaststroke | 1:00.75 | 33 | Did not advance | | | |
| Maxime Grousset | 50 m freestyle | 21.97 | =15 Q | 21.87 | =12 | Did not advance | |
| Maxime Grousset | 100 m freestyle | 48.25 | 12 Q | 47.82 | 8 Q | 47.72 | 4 |
| Florent Manaudou | 50 m freestyle | 21.65 | 2 Q | 21.53 | 2 Q | 21.55 | 2nd place, silver medalist(s) |
| Léon Marchand | 200 m butterfly | 1:55:85 | 15 Q | 1:55.68 | 14 | Did not advance | |
| Léon Marchand | 200 m individual medley | 1:58.30 | 18 | Did not advance | | | |
| Léon Marchand | 400 m individual medley | 4:10.09 | 7 Q | —N/a | | 4:11.16 | 6 |
| Mehdy Metella | 100 m freestyle | 48.68 | 23 | Did not advance | | | |
| Mehdy Metella | 100 m butterfly | 51.53 | 10 Q | 51.32 | 9 | Did not advance | |
| Yohann Ndoye Brouard | 100 m backstroke | 53.13 | 6 Q | DSQ | | Did not advance | |
| Yohann Ndoye Brouard | 200 m backstroke | 1:57.96 | 17 Q | 1:56.83 | 9 | Did not advance | |
| Marc-Antoine Olivier | 10 km open water | —N/a | | | | 1:50:23.0 | 6 |
| Jordan Pothain | 200 m freestyle | 1:46.75 | 20 | Did not advance | | | |
| Mewen Tomac | 100 m backstroke | 53.49 | 10 Q | 53.62 | 14 | Did not advance | |
| Mewen Tomac | 200 m backstroke | 1:59.02 | 25 | Did not advance | | | |
| Antoine Viquerat | 200 m breaststroke | 2:09.54 | 12 Q | 2:09.97 | =12 | Did not advance | |
| Maxime Grousset; Florent Manaudou; Mehdy Metella; Clément Mignon; Charles Rihoux^{[a]} | 4 × 100 m freestyle relay | 3:12.35 | 4 Q | —N/a | | 3:11.09 | 6 |
| Jonathan Atsu; Jordan Pothain; Hadrien Salvan; Enzo Tesic | 4 × 200 m freestyle relay | 7:08.88 | 11 | —N/a | | Did not advance | |
| Léon Marchand; Mehdy Metella; Yohann Ndoye Brouard; Antoine Viquerat | 4 × 100 m medley relay | 3:33.41 | 10 | —N/a | | Did not advance | |

Women

| Athlete | Event | Heat | | Semifinal | | Final | |
| Athlete | Event | Time | Rank | Time | Rank | Time | Rank |
|---|---|---|---|---|---|---|---|
| Charlotte Bonnet | 100 m freestyle | 53.67 | 15 Q | 54.10 | 15 | Did not advance | |
| Charlotte Bonnet | 200 m freestyle | 1:56:88 | 10 Q | 1:57.35 | 13 | Did not advance | |
| Cyrielle Duhamel | 200 m individual medley | 2:11:11 | 11 Q | 2:10.84 | 11 | Did not advance | |
| Béryl Gastaldello | 100 m backstroke | 1:00.69 | 23 | Did not advance | | | |
| Lara Grangeon | 10 km open water | —N/a | | | | 2:00:57.3 | 9 |
| Mélanie Henique | 50 m freestyle | 24.69 | 14 Q | 24.63 | =11 | Did not advance | |
| Fantine Lesaffre | 200 m individual medley | 2:14:20 | 21 | Did not advance | | | |
| Fantine Lesaffre | 400 m individual medley | 4:41.98 | 13 | —N/a | | Did not advance | |
| Marie Wattel | 50 m freestyle | 24.82 | 18 Q | 24.76 | 14 | Did not advance | |
| Marie Wattel | 100 m freestyle | 53.71 | =16 Q | 53.12 | 9 | Did not advance | |
| Marie Wattel | 100 m butterfly | 57.08 | 8 Q | 56.16 | 2 Q | 56.27 | 6 |
| Charlotte Bonnet; Margaux Fabre; Béryl Gastaldello; Anouchka Martin | 4 × 100 m freestyle relay | 3:36.61 | 10 | —N/a | | Did not advance | |
| Charlotte Bonnet; Margaux Fabre; Lucile Tessariol; Assia Touati | 4 × 200 m freestyle relay | 7:55.05 | 7 Q | —N/a | | 7:58.15 | 8 |

^{a} Swimmers who participated in the heats only.

== Table tennis ==
France entered six athletes into the table tennis competition at the Games. The men's team secured a berth by advancing to the quarterfinal round of the 2020 World Olympic Qualification Event in Gondomar, Portugal, permitting a maximum of two starters to compete in the men's singles tournament. Moreover, an additional berth was awarded to the French table tennis players competing in the inaugural mixed doubles based on the ITTF World Rankings of 1 May 2021. 16-year-old teen Prithika Pavade and Chinese-born Yuan Jia Nan scored a second-match final triumph each to book two of the four available places in the women's singles at the 2021 European Qualification Tournament in Odivelas, Portugal. On 9 June 2021, ITTF granted a spare berth forfeited by North Korea to the French women's table tennis team, as the next highest-ranked eligible nation in the federation's World Rankings.

The men's table tennis team was officially named as part of the nation's tenth batch of nominated athletes for the Games on 26 May 2021, including Rio 2016 Olympians Emmanuel Lebesson and Simon Gauzy.

Men

| Athlete | Event | Preliminary | Round 1 | Round 2 | Round 3 | Round of 16 | Quarterfinals | Semifinals | Final / BM | |
| Athlete | Event | Opposition Result | Opposition Result | Opposition Result | Opposition Result | Opposition Result | Opposition Result | Opposition Result | Opposition Result | Rank |
|---|---|---|---|---|---|---|---|---|---|---|
| Simon Gauzy | Singles | Bye | | | Groth (DEN); W 4–0 | Ma L (CHN); L 1–4 | Did not advance | | | |
| Emmanuel Lebesson | Singles | Bye | | Gaćina (CRO); W 4–0 | Fan Zd (CHN); L 0–4 | Did not advance | | | | |
| Alexandre Cassin; Simon Gauzy; Emmanuel Lebesson | Team | —N/a | | | | Hong Kong; W 3–0 | China; L 0–3 | Did not advance | | |

Women

| Athlete | Event | Preliminary | Round 1 | Round 2 | Round 3 | Round of 16 | Quarterfinals | Semifinals | Final / BM | |
| Athlete | Event | Opposition Result | Opposition Result | Opposition Result | Opposition Result | Opposition Result | Opposition Result | Opposition Result | Opposition Result | Rank |
|---|---|---|---|---|---|---|---|---|---|---|
| Prithika Pavade | Singles | Bye | Noskova (ROC); L 2–4 | Did not advance | | | | | | |
| Yuan Jianan | Singles | Bye | Abdel Razek (EGY); W 4–0 | Takahashi (BRA); W 4–0 | Jeon J-h (KOR); L 3–4 | Did not advance | | | | |
| Stéphanie Loeuillette; Prithika Pavade; Yuan Jianan | Team | —N/a | | | | Singapore; L 0–3 | Did not advance | | | |

Mixed

| Athlete | Event | Round of 16 | Quarterfinals | Semifinals | Final / BM | |
| Athlete | Event | Opposition Result | Opposition Result | Opposition Result | Opposition Result | Rank |
|---|---|---|---|---|---|---|
| Emmanuel Lebesson; Yuan Jianan | Doubles | Hu / Tapper (AUS); W 4–0 | Wong C-t / Doo H K (HKG); W 4–3 | Xu X / Liu Sw (CHN); L 0–4 | Lin Y-j / Cheng I-c (TPE); L 0–4 | 4 |

== Taekwondo ==
France entered two athletes into the taekwondo competition at the Games. 2019 world bronze medalist Magda Wiet-Hénin (women's 67 kg) and Althéa Laurin (women's +67 kg) secured the spots on the French taekwondo squad with a top two finish each in their respective weight classes at the 2021 European Qualification Tournament in Sofia, Bulgaria.

| Athlete | Event | Round of 16 | Quarterfinals | Semifinals | Repechage | Final / BM | |
| Athlete | Event | Opposition Result | Opposition Result | Opposition Result | Opposition Result | Opposition Result | Rank |
|---|---|---|---|---|---|---|---|
| Magda Wiet-Hénin | Women's −67 kg | Wahba (EGY); L 10–11 | Did not advance | | | | |
| Althéa Laurin | Women's +67 kg | Acosta (MEX); W 21–3 | Zheng Sy (CHN); W 14–6 | Mandić (SRB); L 5–7 | Bye | Traoré (CIV); W 17–8 | 3rd place, bronze medalist(s) |

== Tennis ==
At the conclusion of the qualification period for the Olympic tennis tournament, the following French players had qualified for the competition by means of rankings.

Men

| Athlete | Event | Round of 64 | Round of 32 | Round of 16 | Quarterfinals | Semifinals | Final / BM | |
| Athlete | Event | Opposition Score | Opposition Score | Opposition Score | Opposition Score | Opposition Score | Opposition Score | Rank |
|---|---|---|---|---|---|---|---|---|
| Jérémy Chardy | Singles | Barrios (CHI); W 6–1, 7–6^{(7–4)} | Karatsev (ROC); W 7–5, 4–6, 6–3 | Broady (GBR); W 7–6^{(7–3)}, 4–6, 6–1 | Zverev (GER); L 4–6, 1–6 | Did not advance | | |
| Ugo Humbert | Singles | Andújar (ESP); W 7–6^{(7–3)}, 6–1 | Kecmanović (SRB); W 4–6, 7–6^{(7–5)}, 7–5 | Tsitsipas (GRE); W 2–6, 7–6^{(7–4)}, 6–2 | Khachanov (ROC); L 6–7^{(4–7)}, 6–4, 3–6 | Did not advance | | |
| Gaël Monfils | Singles | Ivashka (BLR); L 4–6, 6–4, 5–7 | Did not advance | | | | | |
| Gilles Simon | Singles | Gerasimov (BLR); L 6–4, 3–6, 4–6 | Did not advance | | | | | |
| Jérémy Chardy; Gaël Monfils | Doubles | —N/a | Bublik / Golubev (KAZ); W 6–7^{(4–7)}, 7–6^{(7–3)}, [10–8] | Struff / Zverev (GER); L 4–6, 5–7 | Did not advance | | | |
| Pierre-Hugues Herbert; Nicolas Mahut | Doubles | —N/a | Murray / Salisbury (GBR); L 3–6, 2–6 | Did not advance | | | | |

Women

| Athlete | Event | Round of 64 | Round of 32 | Round of 16 | Quarterfinals | Semifinals | Final / BM | |
| Athlete | Event | Opposition Score | Opposition Score | Opposition Score | Opposition Score | Opposition Score | Opposition Score | Rank |
|---|---|---|---|---|---|---|---|---|
| Alizé Cornet | Singles | Plíšková (CZE); L 1–6, 3–6 | Did not advance | | | | | |
| Fiona Ferro | Singles | Sevastova (LAT); W 2–6, 6–4, 6–2 | Sorribes (ESP); L 1–6, 4–6 | Did not advance | | | | |
| Caroline Garcia | Singles | Vekić (CRO); L 2–6, 7–6^{(7–2)}, 3–6 | Did not advance | | | | | |
| Kristina Mladenovic | Singles | Badosa (ESP); L 7–6^{(7–4)}, 3–6, 0–6 | Did not advance | | | | | |
| Alizé Cornet; Fiona Ferro | Doubles | —N/a | Svitolina / Yastremska (UKR); W 6–2, 6–4 | Mattek-Sands / Pegula (USA); L 1–6, 4–6 | Did not advance | | | |
| Caroline Garcia; Kristina Mladenovic | Doubles | —N/a | Bertens / Schuurs (NED); L 6–7^{(5–7)}, 7–5, [9–11] | Did not advance | | | | |

Mixed

| Athlete | Event | Round of 16 | Quarterfinals | Semifinals | Final / BM | |
| Athlete | Event | Opposition Score | Opposition Score | Opposition Score | Opposition Score | Rank |
|---|---|---|---|---|---|---|
| Kristina Mladenovic; Nicolas Mahut | Doubles | Vesnina / Karatsev (ROC); L 4–6, 2–6 | Did not advance | | | |
| Fiona Ferro; Pierre-Hugues Herbert | Doubles | Świątek / Kubot (POL); L 3–6, 6–7^{(3–7)} | Did not advance | | | |

== Triathlon ==
French qualified five triathletes for the following events at the Games by finishing among the top seven nations in the ITU Mixed Relay Olympic Rankings.

Individual

| Athlete | Event | Time | | | | | | Rank |
| Athlete | Event | Swim (1.5 km) | Trans 1 | Bike (40 km) | Trans 2 | Run (10 km) | Total | Rank |
|---|---|---|---|---|---|---|---|---|
| Léo Bergère | Men's | 18:00 | 0:41 | 56:22 | 0:30 | 31:47 | 1:47:20 | 21 |
| Dorian Coninx | Men's | 18:04 | 0:41 | 56:18 | 0:30 | 31:15 | 1:46:48 | 17 |
| Vincent Luis | Men's | 17:39 | 0:39 | 56:45 | 0:30 | 30:51 | 1:46:24 | 13 |
| Cassandre Beaugrand | Women's | 19:37 | 0:42 | Did not finish | | | | |
| Léonie Périault | Women's | 19:13 | 0:43 | 1:03:13 | 0:34 | 34:06 | 1:57:49 | 5 |

Relay

| Athlete | Event | Time | | | | | | Rank |
| Athlete | Event | Swim (300 m) | Trans 1 | Bike (7 km) | Trans 2 | Run (2 km) | Total group | Rank |
|---|---|---|---|---|---|---|---|---|
| Dorian Coninx | Mixed relay | 4:12 | 0:38 | 9:24 | 0:27 | 5:28 | 20:09 | —N/a |
| Vincent Luis | Mixed relay | 3:54 | 0:35 | 9:34 | 0:27 | 5:48 | 20:18 | —N/a |
| Cassandre Beaugrand | Mixed relay | 4:19 | 0:38 | 10:31 | 0:29 | 6:00 | 21:57 | —N/a |
| Léonie Périault | Mixed relay | 4:02 | 0:40 | 10:22 | 0:31 | 6:05 | 21:40 | —N/a |
| Total | Mixed relay | —N/a | | | | | 1:24:04 | 3rd place, bronze medalist(s) |

== Volleyball ==
=== Indoor ===
Summary

| Team | Event | Group Stage | | | | | | Quarterfinal | Semifinal | Final / BM | |
| Team | Event | Opposition Score | Opposition Score | Opposition Score | Opposition Score | Opposition Score | Rank | Opposition Score | Opposition Score | Opposition Score | Rank |
|---|---|---|---|---|---|---|---|---|---|---|---|
| France men's | Men's tournament | United States; L 0–3 | Tunisia; W 3–0 | Argentina; L 2–3 | ROC; W 3–1 | Brazil; L 2–3 | 4 Q | Poland; W 3–2 | Argentina; W 3–0 | ROC; W 3–2 | 1st place, gold medalist(s) |

==== Men's tournament ====
France men's volleyball team qualified for the Olympics by winning the final match and securing an outright berth at the European Olympic Qualification Tournament in Berlin, Germany.

Team roster

The France roster was announced on 18 June 2021.

Head coach: (France) Laurent Tillie

- 1 Barthélémy Chinenyeze MB
- 2 Jenia Grebennikov L
- 4 Jean Patry OP
- 6 Benjamin Toniutti (c) S
- 7 Kevin Tillie OH
- 9 Earvin N'Gapeth OH
- 11 Antoine Brizard S
- 12 Stephen Boyer OP
- 14 Nicolas Le Goff MB
- 16 Daryl Bultor MB
- 17 Trévor Clévenot OH
- 19 Yacine Louati OH

Group play

| Pos | Team | Pld | W | L | Pts | SW | SL | SR | SPW | SPL | SPR | Qualification |
|---|---|---|---|---|---|---|---|---|---|---|---|---|
| 1 | ROC | 5 | 4 | 1 | 12 | 13 | 5 | 2.600 | 427 | 397 | 1.076 | Quarterfinals |
| 2 | Brazil | 5 | 4 | 1 | 10 | 12 | 8 | 1.500 | 476 | 450 | 1.058 | Quarterfinals |
| 3 | Argentina | 5 | 3 | 2 | 8 | 12 | 10 | 1.200 | 476 | 464 | 1.026 | Quarterfinals |
| 4 | France | 5 | 2 | 3 | 8 | 10 | 10 | 1.000 | 449 | 442 | 1.016 | Quarterfinals |
| 5 | United States | 5 | 2 | 3 | 6 | 8 | 10 | 0.800 | 432 | 412 | 1.049 | |
| 6 | Tunisia | 5 | 0 | 5 | 1 | 3 | 15 | 0.200 | 339 | 434 | 0.781 | |

Source: Tokyo 2020 and FIVB
Rules for classification: Tiebreakers

| 24 July 2021; 23:00 v | United States | 3–0 | France | Ariake Arena, Tokyo; Referees: Wojciech Maroszek (POL), Hernán Casamiquela (ARG) |
| 24 July 2021; 23:00 v | (25–18, 25–18, 25–22); Results Statistics | | | Ariake Arena, Tokyo; Referees: Wojciech Maroszek (POL), Hernán Casamiquela (ARG) |

| 26 July 2021; 16:25 v | France | 3–0 | Tunisia | Ariake Arena, Tokyo; Referees: Vladimir Simonović (SRB), Kang Joo-hee (KOR) |
| 26 July 2021; 16:25 v | (25–21, 25–11, 25–21); Results Statistics | | | Ariake Arena, Tokyo; Referees: Vladimir Simonović (SRB), Kang Joo-hee (KOR) |

| 28 July 2021; 14:20 v | Argentina | 3–2 | France | Ariake Arena, Tokyo; Referees: Liu Jiang (CHN), Daniele Rapisarda (ITA) |
| 28 July 2021; 14:20 v | (23–25, 25–17, 25–20, 15–25, 15–13); Results Statistics | | | Ariake Arena, Tokyo; Referees: Liu Jiang (CHN), Daniele Rapisarda (ITA) |

| 30 July 2021; 22:35 v | ROC | 1–3 | France | Ariake Arena, Tokyo; Referees: Shin Muranaka (JPN), Paulo Turci (BRA) |
| 30 July 2021; 22:35 v | (21–25, 25–20, 17–25, 20–25); Results Statistics | | | Ariake Arena, Tokyo; Referees: Shin Muranaka (JPN), Paulo Turci (BRA) |

| 1 August 2021; 11:05 v | Brazil | 3–2 | France | Ariake Arena, Tokyo; Referees: Wojciech Maroszek (POL), Liu Jiang (CHN) |
| 1 August 2021; 11:05 v | (25–22, 37–39, 25–17, 21–25, 20–18); Results Statistics | | | Ariake Arena, Tokyo; Referees: Wojciech Maroszek (POL), Liu Jiang (CHN) |

Quarterfinal

| 3 August 2021; 21:30 v | Poland | 2–3 | France | Ariake Arena, Tokyo; Referees: Juraj Mokrý (SVK), Daniele Rapisarda (ITA) |
| 3 August 2021; 21:30 v | (25–21, 22–25, 25–21, 21–25, 9–15); Results Statistics | | | Ariake Arena, Tokyo; Referees: Juraj Mokrý (SVK), Daniele Rapisarda (ITA) |

Semifinal

| 5 August 2021; 21:00 v | France | 3–0 | Argentina | Ariake Arena, Tokyo; Referees: Shin Muranaka (JPN), Liu Jiang (CHN) |
| 5 August 2021; 21:00 v | (25–22, 25–19, 25–22); Results Statistics | | | Ariake Arena, Tokyo; Referees: Shin Muranaka (JPN), Liu Jiang (CHN) |

Gold medal game

| 7 August 2021; 21:15 v | (gold) France | 3–2 | ROC (silver) | Ariake Arena, Tokyo; Referees: Vladimir Simonović (SRB), Paulo Turci (BRA) |
| 7 August 2021; 21:15 v | (25–23, 25–17, 21–25, 21–25, 15–12); Results Statistics | | | Ariake Arena, Tokyo; Referees: Vladimir Simonović (SRB), Paulo Turci (BRA) |

== Weightlifting ==
France qualified four weightlifters (one man and three women) for each of the following classes into the Olympic competition. Two-time Olympian Bernardin Kingue Matam (men's 67 kg) and Dora Tchakounté (women's 59 kg) secured one of the top eight slots each in their respective weight divisions based on the IWF Absolute World Ranking, with Anaïs Michel (women's 49 kg) and Gaëlle Nayo-Ketchanke (women's 87 kg) topping the list of weightlifters from Europe in the IWF Absolute Continental Ranking.

| Athlete | Event | Snatch | | Clean & Jerk | | Total | Rank |
| Athlete | Event | Result | Rank | Result | Rank | Total | Rank |
|---|---|---|---|---|---|---|---|
| Bernardin Kingue Matam | Men's −67 kg | 135 | 9 | ~~172~~ | DNF | 135 | DNF |
| Anaïs Michel | Women's −49 kg | 78 | 10 | 99 | 6 | 177 | 7 |
| Dora Tchakounté | Women's −59 kg | 96 | 2 | 117 | 4 | 213 | 4 |
| Gaëlle Nayo-Ketchanke | Women's −87 kg | 108 | 7 | 139 | 5 | 247 | 5 |

== Wrestling ==
France qualified two wrestlers for each of the following classes into the Olympic competition. One of them granted an Olympic license by advancing to the top two finals of the women's freestyle 68 kg at the 2021 European Qualification Tournament in Budapest, Hungary, while another French wrestler claimed one of the remaining slots in the women's freestyle 57 kg at the 2021 World Qualification Tournament in Sofia, Bulgaria.

Key:

- VT (ranking points: 5–0 or 0–5) – Victory by fall.
- VB (ranking points: 5–0 or 0–5) – Victory by injury (VF for forfeit, VA for withdrawal or disqualification)
- PP (ranking points: 3–1 or 1–3) – Decision by points – the loser with technical points.
- PO (ranking points: 3–0 or 0–3) – Decision by points – the loser without technical points.
- ST (ranking points: 4–0 or 0–4) – Great superiority – the loser without technical points and a margin of victory of at least 8 (Greco-Roman) or 10 (freestyle) points.
- SP (ranking points: 4–1 or 1–4) – Technical superiority – the loser with technical points and a margin of victory of at least 8 (Greco-Roman) or 10 (freestyle) points.

Freestyle

| Athlete | Event | Round of 16 | Quarterfinal | Semifinal | Repechage | Final / BM | |
| Athlete | Event | Opposition Result | Opposition Result | Opposition Result | Opposition Result | Opposition Result | Rank |
|---|---|---|---|---|---|---|---|
| Mathilde Rivière | Women's −57 kg | Boldsaikhan (MGL); L 0–5 ^{VB} | Did not advance | | | | 14 |
| Koumba Larroque | Women's −68 kg | Soronzonbold (MGL); L 0–5 ^{VT} | Did not advance | | | | 13 |

== See also ==
- France at the 2020 Summer Paralympics
