= Maxime Collard =

France equestrian

Personal information
- Born: 27 July 1983 (age 43) Lyon, France

Sport
- Country: France
- Sport: Equestrian
- Club: Haras du Bois Hubert
- Coached by: Jan Bemelmans

Achievements and titles
- Olympic finals: 2020 Olympic Games

Maxime Collard (born 27 July 1983) is a French Olympic equestrian athlete.

== Career ==
Collard competed at the Young Riders European Championships in 2006 and 2007 in Stadl-Paura and Nussloch. In 2016, she made her international debut on Grand Prix level. Collard represented France at the Olympic Games in Tokyo.
