= Romain Lagarde =

French handball player (born 1997)

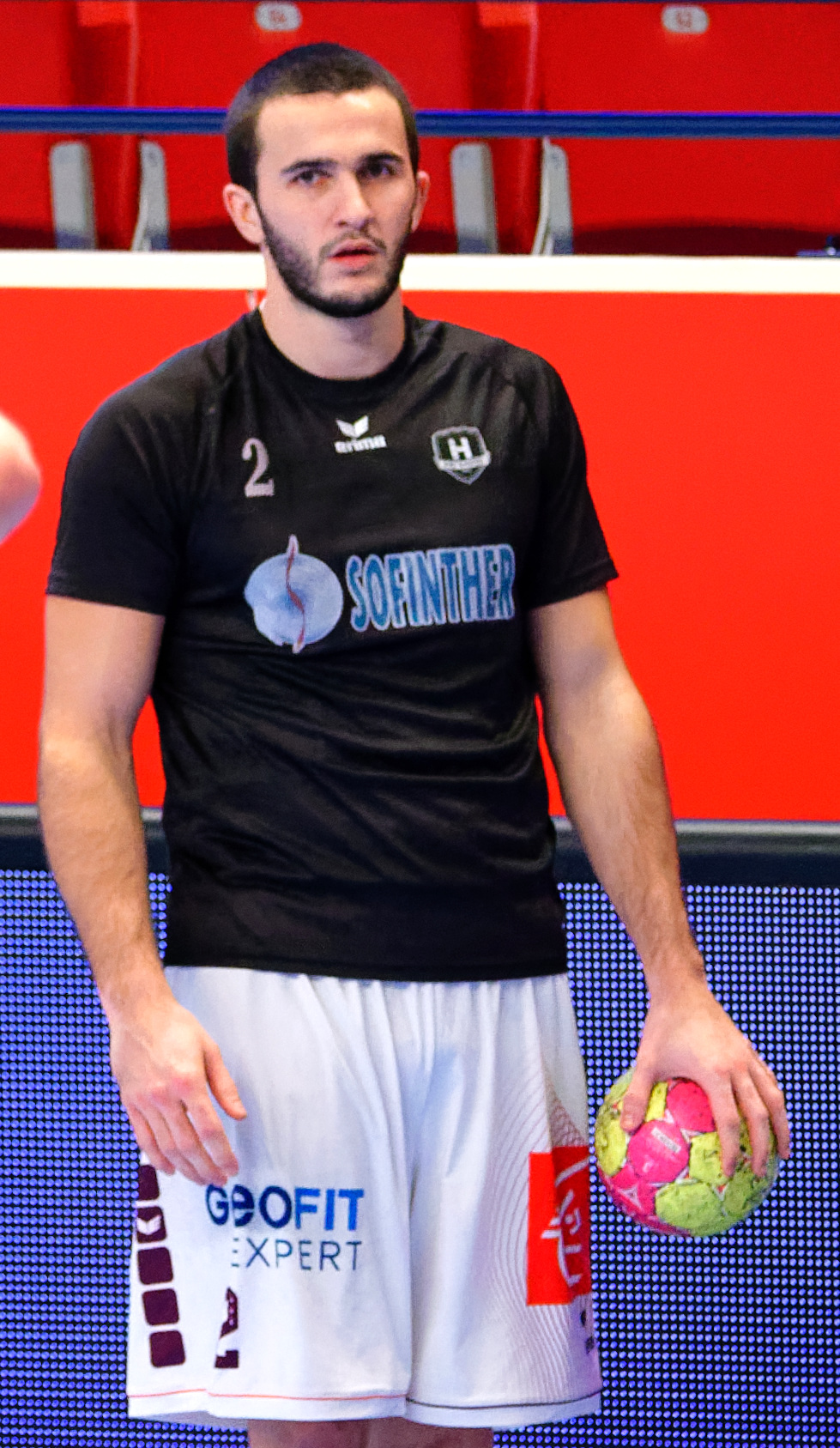
- Lagarde in 2017

Personal information
- Nationality: French
- Born: 5 March 1997 (age 29) Lorient, France
- Height: 1.94 m (6 ft 4 in)

Sport
- Sport: Handball
- Position: Centre back
- Current club: Pays d'Aix Université Club
- Number: 5

Senior clubs
- Years: Team
- 2016–2019: HBC Nantes
- 2019–2021: Rhein-Neckar Löwen
- 2021–02/2025: Pays d'Aix UC
- 02/2025–: HBC Nantes
National team
Years	Team	Apps	(Gls)
2017–	France	81	(89)
Medal record
Olympic Games
Gold medal – first place	2020 Tokyo	Team
World Championship
Silver medal – second place	2023 Poland/Sweden
Bronze medal – third place	2019 Germany/Denmark
Bronze medal – third place	2025 Croatia/Denmark/Norway
European Championship
Bronze medal – third place	2018 Croatia
- Updated on 10 July 2025

Romain Lagarde (born 5 March 1997) is a French handball player for Pays d'Aix Université Club and the French national team.

He was part of the French team that won bronze medals at the 2018 European Men's Handball Championship. At the 2025 World Championship he won bronze medals with France, losing to Croatia in the semifinal and beating Portugal in the third place playoff.
