= China at the 2020 Summer Olympics =

- IOC code: CHN
- NOC: Chinese Olympic Committee
- Website: www.olympic.cn (in Chinese and English)

in Tokyo, Japan July 23, 2021 – August 8, 2021
- Competitors: 406 (125 men & 281 women) in 30 sports
- Flag bearers (opening): Zhu Ting; Zhao Shuai
- Flag bearer (closing): Su Bingtian
- Medals Ranked 2nd: Gold 38 Silver 32 Bronze 19 Total 89

Summer Olympics appearances (overview)
- 1952; 1956–1980; 1984; 1988; 1992; 1996; 2000; 2004; 2008; 2012; 2016; 2020; 2024; 2028

Other related appearances
- Republic of China (1924–1948)

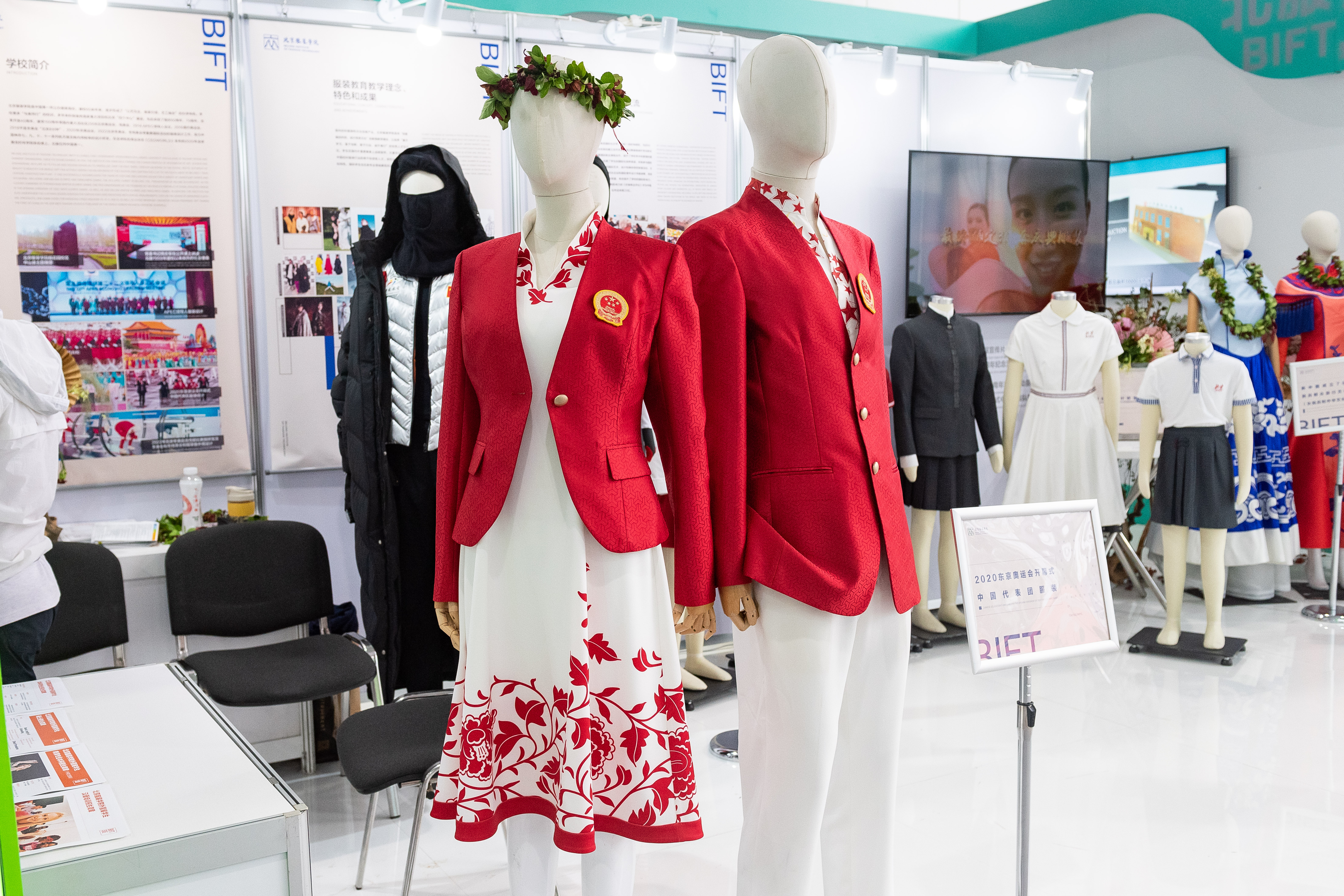
Uniform of the Team China at the opening ceremony, designed by Beijing Institute of Fashion Technology

The People's Republic of China competed at the 2020 Summer Olympics in Tokyo, Japan. Originally scheduled to take place from 24 July to 9 August 2020, the Games were postponed to 23 July to 8 August 2021 because of the COVID-19 pandemic. It was the nation's eleventh appearance at the Summer Olympics since its debut in 1952. The opening ceremony flag-bearers for China were volleyball player Zhu Ting and taekwondo practitioner Zhao Shuai. Sprinter Su Bingtian, who broke the Asian record of 100 m during the Games, was the flag-bearer for the closing ceremony. The delegation competed in all sports except baseball (softball), handball, and surfing.

China finished the Games with 89 medals, 38 of them gold, an improvement of their previous performance at the last Olympics of 70 medals and 26 golds, which moved them up to the second place in overall medal standing from the third place it occupied at the Rio Games. On 18 February 2022, the British men's relay track and field team was stripped of their medals for doping, which moved up the Chinese team to bronze, their 89th medal at the 2020 Summer Olympics.

== Medalists ==
Medal	Name	Sport	Event	Date
Gold	Yang Qian	Shooting	Women's 10 m air rifle	24 July
Gold	Hou Zhihui	Weightlifting	Women's 49 kg	24 July
Gold	Sun Yiwen	Fencing	Women's épée	24 July
Gold	Shi Tingmao; Wang Han	Diving	Women's synchronized 3 metre springboard	25 July
Gold	Li Fabin	Weightlifting	Men's 61 kg	25 July
Gold	Chen Lijun	Weightlifting	Men's 67 kg	25 July
Gold	Jiang Ranxin; Pang Wei	Shooting	Mixed 10 metre air pistol team	27 July
Gold	Chen Yuxi; Zhang Jiaqi	Diving	Women's synchronized 10 metre platform	27 July
Gold	Yang Qian; Yang Haoran	Shooting	Mixed 10 metre air rifle team	27 July
Gold	Chen Yunxia; Cui Xiaotong; Lü Yang; Zhang Ling	Rowing	Women's quadruple sculls	28 July
Gold	Wang Zongyuan; Xie Siyi	Diving	Men's synchronized 3 metre springboard	28 July
Gold	Shi Zhiyong	Weightlifting	Men's 73 kg	28 July
Gold	Zhang Yufei	Swimming	Women's 200 metre butterfly	29 July
Gold	Yang Junxuan; Tang Muhan; Zhang Yufei; Li Bingjie; Dong Jie; Zhang Yifan	Swimming	Women's 4 × 200 metre freestyle relay	29 July
Gold	Chen Meng	Table tennis	Women's singles	29 July
Gold	Wang Shun	Swimming	Men's 200 metre individual medley	30 July
Gold	Zhu Xueying	Gymnastics	Women's trampoline	30 July
Gold	Wang Yilyu; Huang Dongping	Badminton	Mixed doubles	30 July
Gold	Ma Long	Table tennis	Men's singles	30 July
Gold	Lu Yunxiu	Sailing	Women's RS:X	31 July
Gold	Lü Xiaojun	Weightlifting	Men's 81 kg	31 July
Gold	Gong Lijiao	Athletics	Women's shot put	1 August
Gold	Shi Tingmao	Diving	Women's 3 metre springboard	1 August
Gold	Chen Yufei	Badminton	Women's singles	1 August
Gold	Wang Zhouyu	Weightlifting	Women's 87 kg	2 August
Gold	Liu Yang	Gymnastics	Men's rings	2 August
Gold	Zhang Changhong	Shooting	Men's 50 m rifle 3 positions	2 August
Gold	Bao Shanju; Zhong Tianshi	Cycling	Women's team sprint	2 August
Gold	Li Wenwen	Weightlifting	Women's +87 kg	2 August
Gold	Xie Siyi	Diving	Men's 3 metre springboard	3 August
Gold	Zou Jingyuan	Gymnastics	Men's parallel bars	3 August
Gold	Guan Chenchen	Gymnastics	Women's balance beam	3 August
Gold	Quan Hongchan	Diving	Women's 10 m platform	5 August
Gold	Chen Meng; Sun Yingsha; Wang Manyu	Table tennis	Women's team	5 August
Gold	Fan Zhendong; Ma Long; Xu Xin	Table tennis	Men's team	6 August
Gold	Liu Shiying	Athletics	Women's javelin throw	6 August
Gold	Sun Mengya; Xu Shixiao	Canoeing	Women's C-2 500 metres	7 August
Gold	Cao Yuan	Diving	Men's 10 m platform	7 August
Silver	Sheng Lihao	Shooting	Men's 10 m air rifle	25 July
Silver	Zhang Yufei	Swimming	Women's 100 m butterfly	26 July
Silver	Cao Yuan; Chen Aisen	Diving	Men's synchronized 10 m platform	26 July
Silver	Liao Qiuyun	Weightlifting	Women's 55 kg	26 July
Silver	Xu Xin; Liu Shiwen	Table tennis	Mixed doubles	26 July
Silver	Xiao Ruoteng	Gymnastics	Men's artistic individual all-around	28 July
Silver	Sun Yingsha	Table tennis	Women's singles	29 July
Silver	Liu Lingling	Gymnastics	Women's trampoline	30 July
Silver	Zheng Siwei; Huang Yaqiong	Badminton	Mixed doubles	30 July
Silver	Fan Zhendong	Table tennis	Men's singles	30 July
Silver	Xu Jiayu; Yan Zibei; Yang Junxuan; Zhang Yufei	Swimming	Mixed 4 × 100 metre medley relay	31 July
Silver	Dong Dong	Gymnastics	Men's trampoline	31 July
Silver	Li Junhui; Liu Yuchen	Badminton	Men's doubles	31 July
Silver	Wang Han	Diving	Women's 3 metre springboard	1 August
Silver	Chen Qingchen; Jia Yifan	Badminton	Women's doubles	2 August
Silver	You Hao	Gymnastics	Men's rings	2 August
Silver	Chen Long	Badminton	Men's singles	2 August
Silver	Liu Hao; Zheng Pengfei	Canoeing	Men's C-2 1000 metres	3 August
Silver	Wang Zongyuan	Diving	Men's 3 metre springboard	3 August
Silver	Tang Xijing	Gymnastics	Women's balance beam	3 August
Silver	Wang Zheng	Athletics	Women's hammer throw	3 August
Silver	Huang Xuechen; Sun Wenyan	Artistic swimming	Women's duet	4 August
Silver	Zhu Yaming	Athletics	Men's triple jump	5 August
Silver	Chen Yuxi	Diving	Women's 10 m platform	5 August
Silver	Pang Qianyu	Wrestling	Women's freestyle 53 kg	6 August
Silver	Yin Xiaoyan	Karate	Women's 61 kg	6 August
Silver	Liu Hao	Canoeing	Men's C-1 1000 metres	7 August
Silver	Gu Hong	Boxing	Women's welterweight	7 August
Silver	Yang Jian	Diving	Men's 10 m platform	7 August
Silver	Huang Xuechen; Sun Wenyan; Guo Li; Liang Xinping; Yin Chengxin; Feng Yu; Xiao Yanning; Wang Qianyi	Artistic swimming	Women's team	7 August
Silver	Sun Yanan	Wrestling	Women's freestyle 50 kg	7 August
Silver	Li Qian	Boxing	Women's middleweight	8 August
Bronze	Pang Wei	Shooting	Men's 10 m air pistol	24 July
Bronze	Jiang Ranxin	Shooting	Women's 10 m air pistol	25 July
Bronze	Yang Haoran	Shooting	Men's 10 m air rifle	25 July
Bronze	Zhao Shuai	Taekwondo	Men's 68 kg	25 July
Bronze	Li Bingjie	Swimming	Women's 400 m Freestyle	26 July
Bronze	Wei Meng	Shooting	Women's skeet	26 July
Bronze	Lin Chaopan; Sun Wei; Xiao Ruoteng; Zou Jingyuan	Gymnastics	Men's artistic team all-around	26 July
Bronze	Liu Zhiyu; Zhang Liang	Rowing	Men's double sculls	28 July
Bronze	China women's national 3x3 team: Wan Jiyuan; Wang Lili; Yang Shuyu; Zhang Zhiting	Basketball	Women's 3×3 tournament	28 July
Bronze	Guo Linlin; Ju Rui; Li Jingjing; Miao Tian; Wang Zifeng; Wang Yuwei; Xu Fei; Zhang Min	Rowing	Women's eight	30 July
Bronze	Xiao Jiaruixuan	Shooting	Women's 25 metre pistol	30 July
Bronze	Bi Kun	Sailing	Men's RS:X	31 July
Bronze	Xiao Ruoteng	Gymnastics	Men's floor	1 August
Bronze	Li Yuehong	Shooting	Men's 25 metre rapid fire pistol	2 August
Bronze	Walihan Sailike	Wrestling	Men's Greco-Roman 60 kg	2 August
Bronze	Zhou Qian	Wrestling	Women's freestyle 76 kg	2 August
Bronze	Liu Hong	Athletics	Women's 20 kilometres walk	6 August
Bronze	Gong Li	Karate	Women's +61 kg	7 August
Bronze	Su Bingtian; Wu Zhiqiang; Tang Xingqiang; Xie Zhenye; Yan Haibin	Athletics	4 × 100 m relay	21 March 2022

Medals by sport
Sport	1st place, gold medalist(s)	2nd place, silver medalist(s)	3rd place, bronze medalist(s)	Total
Artistic swimming	0	2	0	2
Athletics	2	2	2	6
Badminton	2	4	0	6
Basketball	0	0	1	1
Boxing	0	2	0	2
Canoeing	1	2	0	3
Cycling	1	0	0	1
Diving	7	5	0	12
Fencing	1	0	0	1
Gymnastics	4	5	2	11
Karate	0	1	1	2
Rowing	1	0	2	3
Sailing	1	0	1	2
Shooting	4	1	6	11
Swimming	3	2	1	6
Table tennis	4	3	0	7
Taekwondo	0	0	1	1
Weightlifting	7	1	0	8
Wrestling	0	2	2	4
Total	38	32	19	89

Medals by date
Day	Date	1st place, gold medalist(s)	2nd place, silver medalist(s)	3rd place, bronze medalist(s)	Total
1	24 July	3	0	1	4
2	25 July	3	1	3	7
3	26 July	0	4	3	7
4	27 July	3	0	0	3
5	28 July	3	1	2	6
6	29 July	3	1	0	4
7	30 July	4	3	2	9
8	31 July	2	3	1	6
9	1 August	3	1	1	5
10	2 August	5	3	3	11
11	3 August	3	4	0	7
12	4 August	0	1	0	1
13	5 August	2	2	0	4
14	6 August	2	2	1	5
15	7 August	2	5	1	8
16	8 August	0	1	0	1
Total		38	32	19	89

Medals by gender
Gender	1st place, gold medalist(s)	2nd place, silver medalist(s)	3rd place, bronze medalist(s)	Total	Percentage
Female	22	16	9	47	53.4%
Male	13	13	9	35	39.8%
Mixed	3	3	0	6	6.8%
Total	38	32	18	88	100%

Multiple medalists
Name	Sport	1st place, gold medalist(s)	2nd place, silver medalist(s)	3rd place, bronze medalist(s)	Total
Zhang Yufei	Swimming	2	2	0	4
Yang Qian	Shooting	2	0	0	2
Shi Tingmao	Diving	2	0	0	2
Xie Siyi	Diving	2	0	0	2
Chen Meng	Table tennis	2	0	0	2
Ma Long	Table tennis	2	0	0	2
Yang Junxuan	Swimming	1	1	0	2
Wang Han	Diving	1	1	0	2
Wang Zongyuan	Diving	1	1	0	2
Chen Yuxi	Diving	1	1	0	2
Sun Yingsha	Table tennis	1	1	0	2
Fan Zhendong	Table tennis	1	1	0	2
Xu Xin	Table tennis	1	1	0	2
Cao Yuan	Diving	1	1	0	2
Pang Wei	Shooting	1	0	1	2
Jiang Ranxin	Shooting	1	0	1	2
Yang Haoran	Shooting	1	0	1	2
Li Bingjie	Swimming	1	0	1	2
Zou Jingyuan	Gymnastics	1	0	1	2
Liu Hao	Canoeing	0	2	0	2
Huang Xuechen	Artistic swimming	0	2	0	2
Sun Wenyan	Artistic swimming	0	2	0	2
Xiao Ruoteng	Gymnastics	0	1	2	3

== Competitors ==
The following is the list of number of competitors in the Games. Note that reserves in field hockey, association football, and water polo are not counted. Chinese state media reported that China sent 431 athletes including reserves, while the IOC website listed 421 athletes from China.

Sport	Men	Women	Total
Archery	3	3	6
Artistic swimming	—	8	8
Athletics	23	27	50
Badminton	6	8	14
Basketball	4	16	20
Boxing	3	3	6
Canoeing	7	11	18
Cycling	3	5	8
Diving	5	5	10
Equestrian	6	0	6
Fencing	5	7	12
Field hockey	0	16	16
Football	0	18	18
Golf	2	2	4
Gymnastics	8	13	21
Judo	0	6	6
Karate	0	2	2
Modern pentathlon	2	2	4
Rowing	7	21	28
Rugby sevens	0	13	13
Sailing	5	7	12
Shooting	10	14	24
Skateboarding	0	2	2
Sport climbing	1	1	2
Swimming	11	19	30
Table tennis	3	3 (Note: The allocated quota in Table tennis is 3 athletes, however there was a late replacement during the Games. In fact, 4 female athletes from China competed.)	6
Taekwondo	2	4	6
Tennis	0	5	5
Triathlon	0	1	1
Volleyball	0	16	16
Water polo	0	13	13
Weightlifting	4	4	8
Wrestling	5	6	11
Total	125	281	406

== Archery ==
Chinese archers qualified each for the men's and women's events by reaching the quarterfinal stage of their respective team recurves at the 2019 World Archery Championships in 's-Hertogenbosch, Netherlands. The Chinese archery team, led by Rio 2016 Olympians Wang Dapeng and Wu Jiaxin, was named to the Tokyo 2020 roster on 27 April 2021.

Men

Athlete	Event	Ranking round		Round of 64	Round of 32	Round of 16	Quarterfinal	Semifinal	Final / BM	
Athlete	Event	Score	Seed	Opposition Score	Opposition Score	Opposition Score	Opposition Score	Opposition Score	Opposition Score	Rank
Li Jialun	Individual	669	11	Baatarkhuyag (MGL); W 6–4	De Smedt (BEL); W 6–5	Abdullin (KAZ); W 6–5	Furukawa (JPN); L 0–6	Did not advance		
Wang Dapeng	Individual	668	13	Mussayev (KAZ); W 6–4	Mohamad (MAS); L 5–6	Did not advance				
Wei Shaoxuan	Individual	674	7	Pineda (COL); W 6–0	Worth (AUS); L 4–6	Did not advance				
Li Jialun; Wang Dapeng; Wei Shaoxuan	Team	2011	3	—N/a		Bye	Chinese Taipei; L 1–5	Did not advance		

Women

Athlete	Event	Ranking round		Round of 64	Round of 32	Round of 16	Quarterfinal	Semifinal	Final / BM	
Athlete	Event	Score	Seed	Opposition Score	Opposition Score	Opposition Score	Opposition Score	Opposition Score	Opposition Score	Rank
Long Xiaoqing	Individual	646	28	Amăistroaie (ROU); W 6–2	Brown (USA); L 0–6	Did not advance				
Wu Jiaxin	Individual	652	18	Folkard (GBR); W 6–2	Bettles (GBR); W 6–2	Nakamura (JPN); W 7–1	Boari (ITA); L 2–6	Did not advance		
Yang Xiaolei	Individual	654	14	Mîrca (MDA); W 6–0	Anagöz (TUR); L 2–6	Did not advance				
Long Xiaoqing; Wu Jiaxin; Yang Xiaolei	Team	1952	5	—N/a		Belarus; L 3–5	Did not advance			

Mixed

Athlete	Event	Ranking round		Round of 16	Quarterfinal	Semifinal	Final / BM	
Athlete	Event	Score	Seed	Opposition Score	Opposition Score	Opposition Score	Opposition Score	Rank
Wang Dapeng; Wu Jiaxin	Team	1328	5 Q	Great Britain; L 3–5	Did not advance			

== Artistic swimming ==
China fielded a squad of eight artistic swimmers to compete in the women's duet and team routine by obtaining one of two highest-ranked spots, not yet qualified, in the team free routine at the 2019 FINA World Championships in Gwangju, South Korea.

Athlete	Event	Technical routine		Free routine (preliminary)			Free routine (final)		
Athlete	Event	Points	Rank	Points	Total (technical + free)	Rank	Points	Total (technical + free)	Rank
Huang Xuechen; Sun Wenyan	Duet	95.5499	2	96.2333	191.7832	2 Q	96.9000	192.4499	2nd place, silver medalist(s)
Feng Yu; Guo Li; Huang Xuechen; Liang Xinping; Wang Qianyi; Sun Wenyan; Xiao Yanning; Yin Chengxin	Team	96.2310	2	—N/a			97.3000	193.5310	2nd place, silver medalist(s)

== Athletics ==
Chinese athletes further achieved the entry standards, either by qualifying time or by world ranking, in the following track and field events (up to a maximum of 3 athletes in each event):

Key

- Note–Ranks given for track events are within the athlete's heat only
- Q = Qualified for the next round
- q = Qualified for the next round as a fastest loser or, in field events, by position without achieving the qualifying target
- NR = National record
- N/A = Round not applicable for the event
- Bye = Athlete not required to compete in round

Track & road events
Men

Athlete	Event	Heat		Quarterfinal		Semifinal		Final	
Athlete	Event	Time	Rank	Time	Rank	Time	Rank	Time	Rank
Su Bingtian	100 m	Bye		10.05	2 Q	9.83 AS	1 Q	9.98	6
Xie Zhenye	100 m	Bye		10.16	5	Did not advance			
Wu Zhiqiang	100 m	Bye		10.18	4	Did not advance			
Xie Zhenye	200 m	20.34	4 q	—N/a		20.45	7	Did not advance	
Xie Wenjun	110 m hurdles	13.51	4 Q	—N/a		13.58	5	Did not advance	
Su Bingtian; Wu Zhiqiang; Tang Xingqiang; Xie Zhenye; Yan Haibin*	4 × 100 m relay	37.92	1 Q	—N/a				37.79	(bronze) ^{[b]}
Dong Guojian	Marathon	—N/a						2:21:35	57
Peng Jianhua	Marathon	—N/a						2:16:39	32
Yang Shaohui	Marathon	—N/a						2:14:58	19
Cai Zelin	20 km walk	—N/a						1:26:39	26
Wang Kaihua	20 km walk	—N/a						1:22:03	7
Zhang Jun	20 km walk	—N/a						1:22:16	8
Bian Tongda	50 km walk	—N/a						3:52:01	7
Luo Yadong	50 km walk	—N/a						4:06:17	28
Wang Qin	50 km walk	—N/a						3:59:35	21

^{b} On 18 February 2022, Great Britain was disqualified from the men's 4 × 100 m relay because of a doping violation, thereby officially stripping them of the silver medal. In this case, Canada will be upgraded to silver, with China receiving the bronze. Medals have not yet been reallocated.

Women

Athlete	Event	Heat		Quarterfinal		Semifinal		Final	
Athlete	Event	Time	Rank	Time	Rank	Time	Rank	Time	Rank
Ge Manqi	100 m	Bye		11.20	4 q	11.22	7	Did not advance	
Liang Xiaojing	100 m	Bye		11.40	5	Did not advance			
Wei Yongli	100 m	Bye		11.48	6	Did not advance			
Wang Chunyu	800 m	2:00.05	3 Q	—N/a		1:59.14	2 Q	1:57.00	5
Chen Jiamin	100 m hurdles	13.09	5	—N/a		Did not advance			
Xu Shuangshuang	3000 m steeplechase	9:34.92	8	—N/a				Did not advance	
Ge Manqi; Huang Guifen; Liang Xiaojing; Li Yuting*; Wei Yongli	4 × 100 m relay	42.82	3 Q	—N/a				42.71	6
Bai Li	Marathon	—N/a						2:49:21	67
Li Zhixuan	Marathon	—N/a						2:45:23	62
Zhang Deshun	Marathon	—N/a						2:37:45	47
Liu Hong	20 km walk	—N/a						1:29:57	3rd place, bronze medalist(s)
Qieyang Shenjie	20 km walk	—N/a						1:31:04	7
Yang Jiayu	20 km walk	—N/a						1:31:54	12

Field events
Men

Athlete	Event	Qualification		Final	
Athlete	Event	Distance	Position	Distance	Position
Gao Xinglong	Long jump	7.86	17	Did not advance	
Huang Changzhou	Long jump	7.96	11 q	7.72	10
Wang Jianan	Long jump	7.81	20	Did not advance	
Fang Yaoqing	Triple jump	16.84	10 q	17.01	8
Wu Ruiting	Triple jump	16.73	14	Did not advance	
Zhu Yaming	Triple jump	17.11	3 Q	17.57	2nd place, silver medalist(s)
Wang Yu	High jump	2.21	=17	Did not advance	
Huang Bokai	Pole vault	5.50	21	Did not advance	

Women

Athlete	Event	Qualification		Final	
Athlete	Event	Distance	Position	Distance	Position
Li Ling	Pole vault	NM	—	Did not advance	
Xu Huiqin	Pole vault	4.55	6 q	4.50	8
Gao Yang	Shot put	18.80	7 Q	18.67	10
Gong Lijiao	Shot put	19.46	1 Q	20.58	1st place, gold medalist(s)
Song Jiayuan	Shot put	19.23	2 Q	19.14	5
Chen Yang	Discus throw	62.72	9 q	61.57	10
Feng Bin	Discus throw	60.45	17	Did not advance	
Su Xinyue	Discus throw	58.90	20	Did not advance	
Liu Shiying	Javelin throw	61.95	9 q	66.34	1st place, gold medalist(s)
Lü Huihui	Javelin throw	61.99	7 q	63.41	5
Luo Na	Hammer throw	69.86	15	Did not advance	
Wang Zheng	Hammer throw	74.29	2 Q	77.03	2nd place, silver medalist(s)

Combined events – Women's heptathlon

Athlete	Event	100H	HJ	SP	200 m	LJ	JT	800 m	Total	Rank
Zheng Ninali	Result	13.27	1.80	13.55	24.56	6.12	42.0	2:10.35	6318	10
Zheng Ninali	Points	1084	978	764	928	887	717	960	6318	10

== Badminton ==
China entered fourteen badminton players (five men and nine women) for the following events based on the BWF Race to Tokyo Rankings; two entries each in the men's and women's singles, two pairs each in the women's and mixed doubles, and one entry in the men's doubles.

Men

Athlete	Event	Group stage				Elimination	Quarterfinals	Semifinals	Final / BM	
Athlete	Event	Opposition Score	Opposition Score	Opposition Score	Rank	Opposition Score	Opposition Score	Opposition Score	Opposition Score	Rank
Chen Long	Singles	Must (EST); W (21–10, 21–9)	Abián (ESP); W (21–11, 21–10)	—N/a	1 Q	Lee Z J (MAS); W (8–21, 21–19, 21–5)	Chou T-c (TPE); W (21–14, 9–21, 21–14)	Ginting (INA); W (21–16, 21–11)	Axelsen (DEN); L (15–21, 12–21)	2nd place, silver medalist(s)
Shi Yuqi	Singles	Abela (MLT); W (21–8, 21–9)	Opti (SUR); W (W/O)	—N/a	1 Q	Christie (INA); W (21–11, 21–9)	Axelsen (DEN); L (13–21, 13–21)	Did not advance		
Li Junhui; Liu Yuchen	Doubles	P Chew / R Chew (USA); W (21–9, 21–17)	Lamsfuß / Seidel (GER); W (21–14, 21–13)	Kamura / Sonoda (JPN); W (21–14, 21–16)	1 Q	—N/a	Astrup / Rasmussen (DEN); W (12–21, 21–14, 21–19)	Chia / Soh (MAS); W (24–22, 21–13)	Lee Y / Wang C-l (TPE); L (18–21, 12–21)	2nd place, silver medalist(s)

Women

Athlete	Event	Group stage				Elimination	Quarterfinals	Semifinals	Final / BM	
Athlete	Event	Opposition Score	Opposition Score	Opposition Score	Rank	Opposition Score	Opposition Score	Opposition Score	Opposition Score	Rank
Chen Yufei	Singles	Hany (EGY); W (21–5, 21–3)	Yiğit (TUR); W (21–14, 21–9)	—N/a	1 Q	Bye	An S-y (KOR); W (21–18, 21–19)	He Bj (CHN); W (21–16, 13–21, 21–12)	Tai T-y (TPE); W (21–18, 19–21, 21–18)	1st place, gold medalist(s)
He Bingjiao	Singles	Abdul Razzaq (MDV); W (21–6, 21–3)	Aghaei (IRI); W (21–11, 21–3)	—N/a	1 Q	Zhang (USA); W (14–21, 9–7^{r})	Okuhara (JPN); W (13–21, 21–13, 21–14)	Chen Yf (CHN); L (16–21, 21–13, 12–21)	Sindhu (IND); L (13–21, 15–21)	4
Chen Qingchen; Jia Yifan	Doubles	Kititharakul / Prajongjai (THA); W (21–6, 21–10)	G Stoeva / S Stoeva (BUL); W (21–18, 21–15)	Kim S-y / Kong H-y (KOR); W (19–21, 21–16, 21–14)	1 Q	—N/a	Fukushima / Hirota (JPN); W (18–21, 21–10, 21–10)	Kim S-y / Kong H-y (KOR); W (21–15, 21–11)	Polii / Rahayu (INA); L (19–21, 15–21)	2nd place, silver medalist(s)
Du Yue; Li Yinhui	Doubles	Fruergaard / Thygesen (DEN); W (21–13, 21–15)	Mapasa / Somerville (AUS); W (21–9, 21–12)	Lee S-h / Shin S-c (KOR); L (19–21, 12–21)	2 Q	—N/a	Polii / Rahayu (INA); L (15–21, 22–20, 17–21)	Did not advance		

Mixed

Athlete	Event	Group stage				Quarterfinals	Semifinals	Final / BM	
Athlete	Event	Opposition Score	Opposition Score	Opposition Score	Rank	Opposition Score	Opposition Score	Opposition Score	Rank
Wang Yilyu; Huang Dongping	Doubles	Lamsfuß / Herttrich (GER); W (24–22, 21–17)	Tang C M / Tse Y S (HKG); W (21–12, 21–18)	Chan P S / Goh L Y (MAS); W (21–13, 21–19)	1 Q	Seo S-j / Chae Y-j (KOR); W (21–9, 21–16)	Watanabe / Higashino (JPN); W (21–23, 21–15, 21–14)	Zheng Sw / Huang Yq (CHN); W (21–17, 17–21, 21–19)	1st place, gold medalist(s)
Zheng Siwei; Huang Yaqiong	Doubles	Elgamal / Hany (EGY); W (21–5, 21–10)	Tabeling / Piek (NED); W (21–15, 22–20)	Seo S-j / Chae Y-j (KOR); W (21–14, 21–17)	1 Q	Jordan / Oktavianti (INA); W (21–17, 21–15)	Tang C M / Tse Y S (HKG); W (21–16, 21–12)	Wang Yy / Huang Dp (CHN); L (17–21, 21–17, 19–21)	2nd place, silver medalist(s)

== Basketball ==
=== Indoor ===
Summary

Team	Event	Group stage				Quarterfinals	Semifinals	Final / BM	
Team	Event	Opposition Score	Opposition Score	Opposition Score	Rank	Opposition Score	Opposition Score	Opposition Score	Rank
China women's	Women's tournament	Puerto Rico; W 97–55	Australia; W 76–74	Belgium; W 74–62	1 Q	Serbia; L 70–77	Did not advance		5

==== Women's tournament ====
China women's basketball team qualified for the Olympics as one of two highest-ranked eligible squads from group B at the Belgrade meet of the 2020 FIBA Women's Olympic Qualifying Tournament.

Team roster

The roster was announced on 3 July 2021.

China women's national basketball team – 2020 Summer Olympics roster
Players
Coaches

Pos.	No.	Name	Age – Date of birth	Height	Club
PG	3	Yang Liwei	26 – 2 January 1995	1.76 m (5 ft 9 in)	Guangdong Vermilion Birds	(China)
G	4	Li Yuan	21 – 29 May 2000	1.70 m (5 ft 7 in)	Shandong Six Stars	(China)
G	5	Wang Siyu	25 – 16 October 1995	1.80 m (5 ft 11 in)	Shandong Six Stars	(China)
G	6	Wu Tongtong	27 – 27 June 1994	1.75 m (5 ft 9 in)	Shanxi Flame	(China)
SF	7	Shao Ting (C)	31 – 10 December 1989	1.84 m (6 ft 0 in)	Sichuan Blue Whales	(China)
F	8	Zhang Ru	21 – 2 September 1999	1.85 m (6 ft 1 in)	Henan Phoenix	(China)
SG	9	Li Meng	26 – 2 January 1995	1.83 m (6 ft 0 in)	Liaoning Flying Eagles	(China)
F	10	Pan Zhenqi	26 – 5 July 1995	1.90 m (6 ft 3 in)	Beijing Great Wall	(China)
PF	11	Huang Sijing	25 – 8 January 1996	1.90 m (6 ft 3 in)	Guangdong Vermilion Birds	(China)
C	13	Sun Mengran	29 – 16 July 1992	1.97 m (6 ft 6 in)	Shandong Six Stars	(China)
C	14	Li Yueru	22 – 28 March 1999	2.00 m (6 ft 7 in)	Guangdong Vermilion Birds	(China)
C	15	Han Xu	21 – 31 October 1999	2.05 m (6 ft 9 in)	Xinjiang Magic Deer	(China)

Head coach

- (China) Xu Limin

Assistant coach(es)

- (China) Jia Nan
- (China) Zheng Wei

Legend

- Club – describes last
  club before the tournament
- Age – describes age
  on 26 July 2021

Group play

Pos	Team	Pld	W	L	PF	PA	PD	Pts	Qualification
1	China	3	3	0	247	191	+56	6	Quarterfinals
2	Belgium	3	2	1	234	196	+38	5	Quarterfinals
3	Australia	3	1	2	240	230	+10	4	Quarterfinals
4	Puerto Rico	3	0	3	176	280	−104	3	

Source: TOCOG and FIBA
Rules for classification: 1) classification points; 2) head-to-head results; 3) head-to-head game points difference; 4) head-to-head number of game points scored.

27 July 2021
21:00
v

Boxscore

Puerto Rico	55–97	China
Scoring by quarter: 17–32, 9–21, 13–18, 16–26
Pts: Rosado 14; Rebs: Quiñones 5 Asts: Gwathmey 4		Pts: Li Yue. 21; Rebs: Han 14; Asts: Huang 7

Saitama Super Arena, Saitama
Referees: Takaki Kato (JPN), Maj Forsberg (DEN), Samir Abaakil (MAR)

30 July 2021
21:00
v

Boxscore

China	76–74	Australia
Scoring by quarter: 27–19, 11–19, 17–9, 21–27
Pts: Wang 20; Rebs: Shao 8 Asts: Li M. 7		Pts: Magbegor 15; Rebs: George 5 Asts: Ebzery 4

Saitama Super Arena, Saitama
Referees: Matthew Kallio (CAN), Maj Forsberg (DEN), Ahmed Al-Shuwaili (IRQ)

2 August 2021
17:20
v

Boxscore

China	74–62	Belgium
Scoring by quarter: 17–21, 21–16, 21–15, 15–10
Pts: Li Yue. 14; Rebs: Li Yue. 8 Asts: Wang 8		Pts: Meesseman 24; Rebs: Meesseman 7 Asts: Mestdagh 5

Saitama Super Arena, Saitama
Referees: Leandro Lezcano (ARG), Yener Yılmaz (TUR), Maj Forsberg (DEN)

Quarterfinal

4 August 2021
10:00
v

Boxscore

China	70–77	Serbia
Scoring by quarter: 14–16, 19–19, 25–14, 12–28
Pts: Shao 17; Rebs: Han 7 Asts: Li Yua. 6		Pts: Brooks 18; Rebs: Vasić 10; Asts: Dabović 6

Saitama Super Arena, Saitama
Referees: Luis Castillo (ESP), Maripier Malo (CAN), Rabah Noujaim (LIB)

=== 3×3 ===
Summary

Team	Event	Group stage								Quarterfinals	Semifinals	Final / BM	
Team	Event	Opposition Score	Opposition Score	Opposition Score	Opposition Score	Opposition Score	Opposition Score	Opposition Score	Rank	Opposition Score	Opposition Score	Opposition Score	Rank
China men's	Men's 3×3 tournament	Serbia; L 13–22	ROC; L 13–21	Latvia; L 17–18	Netherlands; L 18–21	Belgium; W 21–20	Poland; W 21–19	Japan; L 16–21	8	Did not advance			
China women's	Women's 3×3 tournament	Romania; W 21–10	ROC; L 9–19	Italy; W 22–13	France; W 20–13	Japan; W 15–12	United States; L 19–21	Mongolia; W 21–9	3 Q	Italy; W 19–13	ROC; L 14–21	France; W 16–14	3rd place, bronze medalist(s)

==== Men's tournament ====
China men's national 3x3 team qualified directly for the Olympics by securing an outright berth, as one of the three highest-ranked squads, in the men's category of the FIBA rankings.

Team roster

The players were named on 2 July 2021.

- Hu Jinqiu
- Gao Shiyan
- Li Haonan
- Yan Peng

Group play

Pos	Team	Pld	W	L	PF	PA	PD	Qualification
1	Serbia	7	7	0	138	91	+47	Semifinals
2	Belgium	7	4 (Note: Belgium 2–0, Latvia 1–1, Netherlands 0–2)	3	126	127	−1	Semifinals
3	Latvia	7	4	3	133	129	+4	Quarterfinals
4	Netherlands	7	4	3	132	129	+3	Quarterfinals
5	ROC	7	3	4	116	125	−9	Quarterfinals
6	Japan (H)	7	2 (Note: Japan 1–1, 123 PS; Poland 1–1, 120 PS; China 1–1, 119 PS)	5	123	134	−11	Quarterfinals
7	Poland	7	2	5	120	130	−10	
8	China	7	2	5	119	142	−23	

Source: TOCOG and FIBA
Rules for classification: 1) Wins; 2) Head-to-head record; 3) Points scored.
(H) Hosts
Notes:

24 July 2021
12:00
v

Report

China	13–22	Serbia
Pts: Hu 6		Pts: Domović Bulut 11

Aomi Urban Sports Park, Tokyo
Referees: Marek Maliszewski (POL), Glenn Tuitt (USA)

24 July 2021
15:00
v

Report

ROC	21–13	China
Pts: Zuev 12		Pts: Hu 6

Aomi Urban Sports Park, Tokyo
Referees: Glenn Tuitt (USA), Cecília Tóth (HUN)

25 July 2021
15:00
v

Report

China	17–18	Latvia
Pts: Hu 12		Pts: Lasmanis 11

Aomi Urban Sports Park, Tokyo
Referees: Evgeny Ostrovskiy (RUS), Vlad Ghizdareanu (ROU)

25 July 2021
22:00
v

Report

Netherlands	21–18	China
Pts: Van der Horst 8		Pts: Hu 17

Aomi Urban Sports Park, Tokyo
Referees: Glenn Tuitt (USA), Jasmina Juras (SRB)

26 July 2021
11:35
v

Report

Belgium	20–21	China
Pts: Vervoort 10		Pts: Hu 9

Aomi Urban Sports Park, Tokyo
Referees: Marek Maliszewski (POL), Cecília Tóth (HUN)

26 July 2021
19:05
v

Report

Poland	19–21	China
Pts: Pawłowski 7		Pts: Hu 12

Aomi Urban Sports Park, Tokyo
Referees: Vlad Ghizdareanu (ROU), Jasmina Juras (SRB)

27 July 2021
15:05
v

Report

China	16–21	Japan
Pts: Gao 8		Pts: Tominaga, Yasuoka 8

Aomi Urban Sports Park, Tokyo
Referees: Markos Michaelides (SUI), Jasmina Juras (SRB)

==== Women's tournament ====
China women's national 3x3 team qualified directly for the Olympics by securing an outright berth, as one of the four highest-ranked squads, in the women's category of the FIBA rankings.

Team roster

The players were named on 2 July 2021.

- Wan Jiyuan
- Wang Lili
- Yang Shuyu
- Zhang Zhiting

Group play

Pos	Team	Pld	W	L	PF	PA	PD	Qualification
1	United States	7	6	1	136	98	+38	Semifinals
2	ROC	7	5 (Note: ROC 2–0, China 1–1, Japan 0–2)	2	129	90	+39	Semifinals
3	China	7	5	2	127	97	+30	Quarterfinals
4	Japan (H)	7	5	2	130	97	+33	Quarterfinals
5	France	7	4	3	118	116	+2	Quarterfinals
6	Italy	7	2	5	98	125	−27	Quarterfinals
7	Romania	7	1	6	89	142	−53	
8	Mongolia	7	0	7	79	141	−62	

Source: TOCOG and FIBA
Rules for classification: 1) Wins; 2) Head-to-head record; 3) Points scored.
(H) Hosts
Notes:

24 July 2021
10:40
v

Report

China	21–10	Romania
Pts: Wan J, Yang 6		Pts: Cuic 4

Aomi Urban Sports Park, Tokyo
Referees: Marek Maliszewski (POL), Vanessa Devlin (AUS)

24 July 2021
14:00
v

Report

ROC	19–9	China
Pts: O. Frolkina 7		Pts: Wan J 4

Aomi Urban Sports Park, Tokyo
Referees: Vanessa Devlin (AUS), Cecília Tóth (HUN)

25 July 2021
14:25
v

Report

China	22–13	Italy
Pts: Zhang 8		Pts: D'Alie 6

Aomi Urban Sports Park, Tokyo
Referees: Cecília Tóth (HUN), Evgeny Ostrovskiy (RUS)

25 July 2021
21:00
v

Report

China	20–13	France
Pts: Wang L., Yang 7		Pts: Touré 5

Aomi Urban Sports Park, Tokyo
Referees: Glenn Tuitt (USA), Evgeny Ostrovskiy (RUS)

26 July 2021
10:15
v

Report

Japan	12–15	China
Pts: Mawuli 5		Pts: Wang L. 5

Aomi Urban Sports Park, Tokyo
Referees: Marek Maliszewski (POL), Vanessa Devlin (AUS)

26 July 2021
21:00
v

Report

United States	21–19	China
Pts: Plum 10		Pts: Yang 8

Aomi Urban Sports Park, Tokyo
Referees: Sara El-Sharnouby (EGY), Markos Michaelides (SUI)

27 July 2021
13:55
v

Report

China	21–9	Mongolia
Pts: Wan 10		Pts: Chimeddolgor 5

Aomi Urban Sports Park, Tokyo
Referees: Cecília Tóth (HUN), Sara El-Sharnouby (EGY)

Quarter-final

27 July 2021
20:30
v

Report

China	19–13	Italy
Pts: Wang 11		Pts: Consolini, D'Alie 5

Aomi Urban Sports Park, Tokyo
Referees: Vanessa Devlin (AUS), Vlad Ghizdareanu (ROU)

Semi-final

28 July 2021
18:10
v

Report

ROC	21–14	China
Pts: Kozik 10		Pts: Zhang 7

Aomi Urban Sports Park, Tokyo
Referees: Cecília Tóth (HUN), Marek Maliszewski (POL)

Bronze medal match

28 July 2021
20:45
v

Report

France	14–16	China
Pts: Touré 8		Pts: Wang 9

Aomi Urban Sports Park, Tokyo
Referees: Evgeny Ostrovskiy (RUS), Jasmina Juras (SRB)

== Boxing ==
China entered six boxers (three per gender) into the Olympic tournament. Rio 2016 bronze medalists Hu Jianguan (men's flyweight) and Li Qian (women's middleweight), along with rookies Tuohetaerbieke Tanglatihan (men's middleweight), Chen Daxiang (men's light heavyweight), Chang Yuan (women's flyweight), and Gu Hong (women's welterweight), secured the spots on the Chinese squad by advancing to the semifinal match of their respective weight divisions at the 2020 Asia & Oceania Qualification Tournament in Amman, Jordan.

Athlete	Event	Round of 32	Round of 16	Quarterfinals	Semifinals	Final	
Athlete	Event	Opposition Result	Opposition Result	Opposition Result	Opposition Result	Opposition Result	Rank
Hu Jianguan	Men's flyweight	Alakhverdovi (GEO); W 5–0	Tanaka (JPN); L 1–3	Did not advance			
Tuohetaerbieke Tanglatihan	Men's middleweight	Kumar (IND); W 5–0	Conceição (BRA); L 2–3	Did not advance			
Chen Daxiang	Men's light heavyweight	Negmatulloev (TJK); W 4–0	Machado (BRA); L 0–5	Did not advance			
Chang Yuan	Women's flyweight	Bye	Davison (GBR); W 5–0	Krasteva (BUL); L 1–4	Did not advance		
Gu Hong	Women's welterweight	Bye	Manikon (THA); W 5–0	Panguana (MOZ); W 5–0	Jones (USA); W 4–1	Sürmeneli (TUR); L 0–3	2nd place, silver medalist(s)
Li Qian	Women's middleweight	—N/a	O'Rourke (IRL); W 5–0	Rani (IND); W 5–0	Magomedalieva (ROC); W 5–0	Price (GBR); L 0–5	2nd place, silver medalist(s)

== Canoeing ==
=== Slalom ===
Chinese canoeists have qualified a maximum of one boat in each of the following classes through the 2019 ICF Canoe Slalom World Championships in La Seu d'Urgell, Spain and the 2021 Asian Canoe Slalom Championships in Pattaya, Thailand.

Athlete	Event	Preliminary						Semifinals		Final	
Athlete	Event	Run 1	Rank	Run 2	Rank	Best	Rank	Time	Rank	Time	Rank
Quan Xin	Men's K-1	98.86	16	98.06	15	98.06	20 Q	101.99	17	Did not advance	
Chen Shi	Women's C-1	127.36	17	124.15	16	124.15	18 Q	164.99	17	Did not advance	
Li Tong	Women's K-1	115.27	16	114.36	17	114.36	17 Q	126.86	20	Did not advance	

=== Sprint ===
Chinese canoeists qualified six boats in each of the following distances for the Games through the 2019 ICF Canoe Sprint World Championships in Szeged, Hungary and the 2021 Asian Championships in Pattaya, Thailand.

Men

Athlete	Event	Heats		Quarterfinals		Semifinals		Final	
Athlete	Event	Time	Rank	Time	Rank	Time	Rank	Time	Rank
Liu Hao	C-1 1000 m	4:06.914	2 SF	Bye		4:04.196	2 FA	4:05.724	2nd place, silver medalist(s)
Zheng Pengfei	C-1 1000 m	4:10.115	3 QF	4:05.502	1 SF	4:09.139	4 FA	4:14.048	8
Liu Hao; Zheng Pengfei	C-2 1000 m	3:37.783	1 SF	Bye		3:27.023	1 FA	3:25.198	2nd place, silver medalist(s)
Yang Xiaoxu	K-1 200 m	36.561	4 QF	35.852	3	Did not advance			
Zhang Dong	K-1 1000 m	3:40.955	3 QF	3:44.269	2 SF	3:26.246	4 FA	3:28.103	6
Bu Tingkai; Wang Congkang	K-2 1000 m	3:10.292	2 SF	Bye		3:17.784	3 FA	3:19.612	8
Bu Tingkai; Wang Congkang; Yang Xiaoxu; Zhang Dong	K-4 500 m	1:24.264	4 QF	1:24.036	3 SF	1:24.653	5	Did not advance	

Women

Athlete	Event	Heats		Quarterfinals		Semifinals		Final	
Athlete	Event	Time	Rank	Time	Rank	Time	Rank	Time	Rank
Lin Wenjun	C-1 200 m	46.449	2 SF	Bye		47.161	2 FA	47.608	6
Sun Mengya; Xu Shixiao	C-2 500 m	1:57.870	1 SF	Bye		2:01.369	1 FA	1:55.495	1st place, gold medalist(s)
Ma Qing	K-1 200 m	42.706	4 QF	42.321	2 SF	40.837	8 FB	40.652	15
Yin Mengdie	K-1 200 m	41.688	1 SF	Bye		40.069	5 FB	40.365	12
Huang Jieyi	K-1 500 m	1:52.385	6 QF	1:52.689	5	Did not advance			
Yin Mengdie	K-1 500 m	1:52.760	6 QF	1:49.268	1 SF	1:56.977	7	Did not advance	
Li Dongyin; Zhou Yu	K-2 500 m	1:45.831	3 QF	1:47.471	3 SF	1:39.404	5 FB	1:39.790	10
Li Dongyin; Ma Qing; Wang Nan; Zhou Yu	K-4 500 m	1:36.249	3 QF	1:36.379	2 SF	1:36.697	3 FA	1:38.121	6

Qualification Legend: FA = Qualify to final (medal); FB = Qualify to final B (non-medal); SF = Qualify to semifinal round; QF = Qualify to quarterfinal round

== Cycling ==
=== Road ===
China entered one rider each to compete in the men's and women's Olympic road races, by virtue of his top 50 national finish (for men) and her top 100 individual finish (for women) in the UCI World Ranking.

Athlete	Event	Time	Rank
Wang Ruidong	Men's road race	Did not finish	
Sun Jiajun	Women's road race	Did not finish	

=== Track ===
Following the completion of the 2020 UCI Track Cycling World Championships, Chinese riders accumulated spots in the women's team sprint, as well as the women's sprint, keirin, and omnium, based on their country's results in the final UCI Olympic rankings.

Unable to earn a spot in the men's team sprint, China won a single quota place in the men's individual sprint through the UCI Olympic rankings. Qualification for the individual sprint thereby implies a quota place being added to the men's keirin.

Sprint

Athlete	Event	Qualification		Round 1	Repechage 1	Round 2	Repechage 2	Round 3	Repechage 3	Quarterfinals	Semifinals	Final	
Athlete	Event	Time Speed (km/h)	Rank	Opposition Time Speed (km/h)	Opposition Time Speed (km/h)	Opposition Time Speed (km/h)	Opposition Time Speed (km/h)	Opposition Time Speed (km/h)	Opposition Time Speed (km/h)	Opposition Time Speed (km/h)	Opposition Time Speed (km/h)	Opposition Time Speed (km/h)	Rank
Xu Chao	Men's sprint	9.584; 75.125	11 Q	Rajkowski (POL); L	Tjon En Fa (SUR); Hart (AUS); L	Did not advance							
Bao Shanju	Women's sprint	10.723; 67.145	18 Q	Braspennincx (NED); L	Basova (UKR); Gaxiola (MEX); W 10.913; 65.976	Hinze (GER); L	Andrews (NZL); L	Did not advance					
Zhong Tianshi	Women's sprint	10.559; 68.188	10 Q	Gaxiola (MEX); W 10.744; 67.014	—N/a	Braspennincx (NED); L	McCulloch (AUS); W 11.200; 64.286	Hinze (GER); L	Andrews (NZL); Starikova (UKR); L	Did not advance			

Team sprint

Athlete	Event	Qualification		Semifinals		Final	
Athlete	Event	Time Speed (km/h)	Rank	Opposition Time Speed (km/h)	Rank	Opposition Time Speed (km/h)	Rank
Bao Shanju; Zhong Tianshi	Women's team sprint	32.135; 56.014	2 Q	Lithuania; W 31.804 WR; 56.597	1 FA	Germany; W 31.895; 56.435	1st place, gold medalist(s)

Qualification legend: FA=Gold medal final; FB=Bronze medal final

Keirin

Athlete	Event	1st Round	Repechage	2nd Round	3rd Round	Final
Athlete	Event	Rank	Rank	Rank	Rank	Rank
Xu Chao	Men's keirin	4 R	5	Did not advance		
Bao Shanju	Women's keirin	4 R	5	Did not advance		
Zhong Tianshi	Women's keirin	2 Q	Bye	3 Q	6 FB	12

Qualification legend: FA=Medal final; FB=7–12 placement final

Omnium

Athlete	Event	Scratch Race		Tempo Race		Elimination Race		Points Race		Total points	Rank
Athlete	Event	Rank	Points	Rank	Points	Rank	Points	Rank	Points	Total points	Rank
Liu Jiali	Women's omnium	10	22	7	28	14	14	11	1	65	11

=== Mountain biking ===
Chinese mountain bikers qualified for one men's and one women's quota place into the Olympic cross-country race, by virtue of a top two national finish, respectively, at the 2019 Asian Championships.

Athlete	Event	Time	Rank
Zhang Peng	Men's cross-country	LAP (3 laps)	36
Yao Bianwa	Women's cross-country	LAP (2 laps)	34

== Diving ==
Chinese divers qualified for the following individual spots and synchronized teams at the Olympics through the 2019 FINA World Championships.

Men

Athlete	Event	Preliminary		Semifinal		Final	
Athlete	Event	Points	Rank	Points	Rank	Points	Rank
Xie Siyi	3 m springboard	520.90	2 Q	543.45	1 Q	558.75	1st place, gold medalist(s)
Wang Zongyuan	3 m springboard	531.30	1 Q	540.50	1 Q	534.90	2nd place, silver medalist(s)
Cao Yuan	10 m platform	529.30	2 Q	513.70	1 Q	582.35	1st place, gold medalist(s)
Yang Jian	10 m platform	546.90	1 Q	480.85	2 Q	580.40	2nd place, silver medalist(s)
Wang Zongyuan; Xie Siyi	3 m synchronized springboard	—N/a				467.82	1st place, gold medalist(s)
Cao Yuan; Chen Aisen	10 m synchronized platform	—N/a				470.58	2nd place, silver medalist(s)

Women

Athlete	Event	Preliminary		Semifinal		Final	
Athlete	Event	Points	Rank	Points	Rank	Points	Rank
Shi Tingmao	3 m springboard	350.45	1 Q	371.45	2 Q	383.50	1st place, gold medalist(s)
Wang Han	3 m springboard	347.25	2 Q	346.85	1 Q	348.75	2nd place, silver medalist(s)
Chen Yuxi	10 m platform	390.70	1 Q	407.75	2 Q	425.40	2nd place, silver medalist(s)
Quan Hongchan	10 m platform	364.45	2 Q	415.65	1 Q	466.20	1st place, gold medalist(s)
Shi Tingmao; Wang Han	3 m synchronized springboard	—N/a				326.40	1st place, gold medalist(s)
Chen Yuxi; Zhang Jiaqi	10 m synchronized platform	—N/a				363.78	1st place, gold medalist(s)

== Equestrian ==
China fielded a squad of three equestrian riders for the first time into the team competitions by securing an outright berth each, as one of two top-ranked nations, qualified at the International Equestrian Federation (FEI)-designated Olympic eventing qualifier for Group F and G (Africa, Middle East, Asia and Oceania) in Saumur, France and at the Olympic jumping qualifier for Group G in Valkenswaard, Netherlands, respectively.

=== Eventing ===
Liang Ruiji and Agore de Bordenave have been named the traveling alternates.

Athlete	Horse	Event	Dressage		Cross-country			Jumping						Total	
Athlete	Horse	Event	Dressage		Cross-country			Qualifier			Final			Total	
Athlete	Horse	Event	Penalties	Rank	Penalties	Total	Rank	Penalties	Total	Rank	Penalties	Total	Rank	Penalties	Rank
Bao Yingfeng	Flandia	Individual	34.40	39	38.00	72.50	39	5.60	78.10	35	Did not advance				
Alex Hua Tian	Don Geniro	Individual	23.90	3	12.00	35.90	18	8.80	44.70	21 Q	17.60	62.30	25	62.30	25
Sun Huadong	Lady Chin van't Moerven Z	Individual	35.20	41	42.00	77.20	42	9.60	86.80	37	Did not advance				
Bao Yingfeng; Alex Hua Tian; Sun Huadong	See above	Team	93.60	7	92.00	185.60	9	24.00	209.60	9	—N/a			209.60	9

=== Jumping ===
Athlete	Horse	Event	Qualification		Final		
Athlete	Horse	Event	Penalties	Rank	Penalties	Time	Rank
Li Zhenqiang	Uncas S	Individual	10	=52	Did not advance		
Zhang Xingjia	For Passion d'Ive Z	Individual	18	65	Did not advance		
Zhang You	Caesar	Individual	Retired		Did not advance		
Li Yaofeng; Li Zhenqiang; Zhang Xingjia	Jericho Dwerse Hagen; Uncas S For Passion d'Ive Z	Team	35	12	Did not advance		

== Fencing ==
Chinese fencers qualified a full squad each in the women's team épée at the Games by finishing among the top four nations in the FIE Olympic Team Rankings, while the women's sabre team claimed the continental spot as the highest-ranked team from Asia and Oceania. Vying for qualification as the next highest-ranked country across all regions, the men's épée team accepted a spare berth freed up by Africa to complete the route in the rankings. Xu Yingming (men's sabre) and Chen Qingyuan (women's foil) secured additional places on the Chinese team as one of the two highest-ranked fencers vying for individual qualification from Asia and Oceania in the FIE Adjusted Official Rankings, while the reigning Asian Games gold medalist Huang Mengkai rounded out the Chinese roster by winning the final match of the men's foil at the Asia and Oceania Zonal Qualifier in Tashkent, Uzbekistan.

Men

Athlete	Event	Round of 64	Round of 32	Round of 16	Quarterfinals	Semifinals	Final / BM	
Athlete	Event	Opposition Score	Opposition Score	Opposition Score	Opposition Score	Opposition Score	Opposition Score	Rank
Dong Chao	Épée	Blais Bélanger (CAN); W 15–7	Siklósi (HUN); L 9–15	Did not advance				
Lan Minghao	Épée	Bye	Nikishyn (UKR); W 13–12	El-Sayed (EGY); L 9–15	Did not advance			
Wang Zijie	Épée	Bye	El Kord (MAR); L 14–15	Did not advance				
Dong Chao; Lan Minghao; Wang Zijie; Shi Gaofeng	Team épée	—N/a			Ukraine; W 45–35	ROC; L 38–45	South Korea; L 42–45	4
Huang Mengkai	Foil	Cervantes (MEX); L 14–15	Did not advance					
Xu Yingming	Sabre	Bye	Samele (ITA); L 12–15	Did not advance				

Women

Athlete	Event	Round of 64	Round of 32	Round of 16	Quarterfinals	Semifinals	Final / BM	
Athlete	Event	Opposition Score	Opposition Score	Opposition Score	Opposition Score	Opposition Score	Opposition Score	Rank
Lin Sheng	Épée	Bye	Diongue (SEN); W 15–6	Isola (ITA); L 9–15	Did not advance			
Sun Yiwen	Épée	Bye	Khakimova (UZB); W 15–10	Zhu My (CHN); W 15–8	Isola (ITA); W 15–11	Murtazaeva (ROC); W 12–8	Popescu (ROU); W 11–10	1st place, gold medalist(s)
Zhu Mingye	Épée	Bye	Hurley (USA); W 15–8	Sun Yw (CHN); L 8–15	Did not advance			
Lin Sheng; Sun Yiwen; Zhu Mingye; Xu Anqi	Team épée	—N/a			Hong Kong; W 44–32	South Korea; L 29–38	Italy; L 21–23	4
Chen Qingyuan	Foil	Bye	Hany (EGY); W 15–6	Jeon H-s (KOR); L 11–14	Did not advance			
Qian Jiarui	Sabre	Bye	Tamura (JPN); W 15–8	Pusztai (HUN); W 15–10	Pozdniakova (ROC); L 12–15	Did not advance		
Shao Yaqi	Sabre	Bye	Dayibekova (UZB); L 10–15	Did not advance				
Yang Hengyu	Sabre	Mohamed (ALG); W 15–1	Kharlan (UKR); W 15–12	Pozdniakova (ROC); L 8–15	Did not advance			
Qian Jiarui; Shao Yaqi; Yang Hengyu; Guo Yiqi	Team sabre	—N/a			Italy; L 41–45	Classification semifinal United States; L 35–45	Seventh place final Hungary; W 45–30	7

== Field hockey ==
Summary

Key:

- FT – After full time.
- P – Match decided by penalty-shootout.

Team	Event	Group stage						Quarterfinals	Semifinals	Final / BM	
Team	Event	Opposition Score	Opposition Score	Opposition Score	Opposition Score	Opposition Score	Rank	Opposition Score	Opposition Score	Opposition Score	Rank
China women's	Women's tournament	Japan; W 4–3	Australia; L 0–6	Argentina; L 2–3	Spain; L 0–2	New Zealand; W 3–2	5	Did not advance			

=== Women's tournament ===
China women's national field hockey team qualified for the Olympics by securing one of the seven tickets available and defeating Belgium in a playoff at the Changzhou leg of the 2019 FIH Olympic Qualifiers.

Team roster

Head coach: Wang Yang

No.	Pos.	Player	Date of birth (age)	Caps	Goals	Club
1	GK	Li Dongxiao	26 November 1987 (aged 33)	151	{{{goals}}}	
2	DF	Gu Bingfeng	25 January 1994 (aged 27)	100	{{{goals}}}	
5	FW	Li Jiaqi	1 July 1995 (aged 26)	101	{{{goals}}}	
6	DF	Zhang Ying	29 August 1998 (aged 22)	17	{{{goals}}}	
7	DF	Cui Qiuxia	11 September 1990 (aged 30)	182	{{{goals}}}	
9	MF	Xu Wenyu	6 December 1995 (aged 25)	75	{{{goals}}}	
10	FW	Peng Yang	17 January 1992 (aged 29)	198	{{{goals}}}	
11	FW	Liang Meiyu	8 January 1994 (aged 27)	181	{{{goals}}}	
13	FW	Li Hong	31 May 1999 (aged 22)	67	{{{goals}}}	
15	MF	Zhang Jinrong	24 March 1997 (aged 24)	129	{{{goals}}}	
16	DF	Ou Zixia	24 September 1995 (aged 25)	107	{{{goals}}}	
19	MF	Zhang Xiaoxue	13 December 1992 (aged 28)	154	{{{goals}}}	
21	FW	Liu Meng	17 December 1995 (aged 25)	30	{{{goals}}}	
24	MF	Wang Na	5 August 1994 (aged 26)	95	{{{goals}}}	
26	MF	Chen Yang	15 February 1997 (aged 24)	52	{{{goals}}}	
28	FW	Luo Tiantian	12 July 1995 (aged 26)	12	{{{goals}}}	
29	FW	Chen Yi	28 January 1997 (aged 24)	38	{{{goals}}}	
31	MF	Zhong Jiaqi	23 September 1999 (aged 21)	53	{{{goals}}}	

Group play

Pos	Team	Pld	W	D	L	GF	GA	GD	Pts	Qualification
1	Australia	5	5	0	0	13	1	+12	15	Quarterfinals
2	Spain	5	3	0	2	9	8	+1	9	Quarterfinals
3	Argentina	5	3	0	2	8	8	0	9	Quarterfinals
4	New Zealand	5	2	0	3	8	7	+1	6	Quarterfinals
5	China	5	2	0	3	9	16	−7	6	
6	Japan (H)	5	0	0	5	6	13	−7	0	

Source: Tokyo 2020 and FIH
Rules for classification: 1) points; 2) matches won; 3) goal difference; 4) goals for; 5) head-to-head result; 6) field goals scored.
(H) Hosts

25 July 2021
11:45
v

Japan	3–4	China
Nomura 21'; Y. Nagai 31'; H. Nagai 45+'	Report	Gu 10', 35'; Zhang Y. 20'; Liang 52'

North Pitch
Umpires:
Ayanna McClean (TTO)
Michelle Meister (GER)

26 July 2021
12:15
v

Australia	6–0	China
Chalker 16', 22'; Peris 31'; Malone 54'; Kershaw 56'; Stewart 58'	Report

South Pitch
Umpires:
Amber Church (NZL)
Laurine Delforge (BEL)

28 July 2021
19:00
v

Argentina	3–2	China
Gorzelany 18', 24'; Jankunas 54'	Report	Li H. 52'; Liu 56'

South Pitch
Umpires:
Annelize Rostron (RSA)
Emi Yamada (JPN)

29 July 2021
18:30
v

Spain	2–0	China
Pérez 4'; Bonastre 19'	Report

North Pitch
Umpires:
Michelle Meister (GER)
Irene Presenqui (ARG)

31 July 2021
09:30
v

China	3–2	New Zealand
Liu 24'; Chen Y. 37'; Liang 54'	Report	Gunson 20'; Keddell 45'

North Pitch
Umpires:
Laurine Delforge (BEL)
Ayanna McClean (TTO)

== Football ==
Summary

Key:

- A.E.T. – After extra time.
- P – Match decided by penalty-shootout.

Team	Event	Group stage				Quarterfinals	Semifinals	Final / BM	
Team	Event	Opposition Score	Opposition Score	Opposition Score	Rank	Opposition Score	Opposition Score	Opposition Score	Rank
China women's team	Women's tournament	Brazil; L 0–5	Zambia; D 4–4	Netherlands; L 2–8	4	Did not advance			10

=== Women's tournament ===
China PR qualified for the Games by defeating South Korea in a two-legged playoff of the 2020 AFC Olympic Qualifying Tournament.

Team roster

A provisional squad of 26 athletes was named on 8 June 2021. The final squad of 22 athletes was announced on 7 July 2021. On 9 July 2021, Chen Qiaozhu replaced Jin Kun.

Head coach: Jia Xiuquan

No.	Pos.	Player	Date of birth (age)	Caps	Goals	Club
1	GK	Zhu Yu	23 July 1997 (aged 23)	1	0	(Chinese Football Association) Wuhan Jianghan University
2	DF	Li Mengwen	28 March 1995 (aged 26)	7	0	(Chinese Football Association) Jiangsu
3	DF	Lin Yuping	28 February 1992 (aged 29)	17	0	(Chinese Football Association) Meizhou Hakka
4	MF	Li Qingtong	14 April 1999 (aged 22)	1	0	(Chinese Football Association) Meizhou Hakka
5	DF	Wu Haiyan	26 February 1993 (aged 28)	120	2	(Chinese Football Association) Wuhan Jianghan University
6	MF	Zhang Xin	23 May 1992 (aged 29)	9	2	(Chinese Football Association) Shanghai Shengli
7	MF	Wang Shuang	23 January 1995 (aged 26)	106	29	(Chinese Football Association) Wuhan Jianghan University
8	MF	Wang Yan	22 August 1991 (aged 29)	30	0	(Chinese Football Association) Beijing BG Phoenix
9	MF	Miao Siwen	24 January 1995 (aged 26)	1	0	(Chinese Football Association) Shanghai Shengli
10	MF	Wang Yanwen	27 March 1999 (aged 22)	0	0	(Chinese Football Association) Beijing BG Phoenix
11	FW	Wang Shanshan (captain)	27 January 1990 (aged 31)	136	52	(Chinese Football Association) Tianjin Shengde
12	GK	Peng Shimeng	12 May 1998 (aged 23)	30	0	(Chinese Football Association) Jiangsu
13	MF	Yang Lina	13 April 1994 (aged 27)	19	2	(Chinese Football Association) Shanghai Shengli
14	MF	Liu Jing	28 April 1998 (aged 23)	0	0	(Chinese Football Association) Changchun Dazhong Zhuoyue
15	FW	Yang Man	2 November 1995 (aged 25)	16	3	(Chinese Football Association) Shandong Sports Lottery
16	DF	Wang Xiaoxue	20 October 1994 (aged 26)	2	0	(Chinese Football Association) Jiangsu
17	DF	Luo Guiping	20 April 1993 (aged 28)	8	0	(Chinese Football Association) Meizhou Hakka
18	FW	Wurigumula	26 August 1996 (aged 24)	0	0	(Chinese Football Association) Changchun Dazhong Zhuoyue
19	MF	Wang Ying	18 November 1997 (aged 23)	3	0	(Chinese Football Association) Wuhan Jianghan University
20	FW	Xiao Yuyi	10 January 1996 (aged 25)	30	4	(Chinese Football Association) Shanghai Shengli
21	MF	Chen Qiaozhu	8 September 1999 (aged 21)	0	0	(Chinese Football Association) Meizhou Hakka
22	GK	Ding Xuan	11 February 1989 (aged 32)	0	0	(Chinese Football Association) Shanghai Shengli

Group play

Pos	Team	Pld	W	D	L	GF	GA	GD	Pts	Qualification
1	Netherlands	3	2	1	0	21	8	+13	7	Advance to knockout stage
2	Brazil	3	2	1	0	9	3	+6	7	Advance to knockout stage
3	Zambia	3	0	1	2	7	15	−8	1	
4	China	3	0	1	2	6	17	−11	1	

Source: TOCOG and FIFA
Rules for classification: Group stage tiebreakers
21 July 2021
17:00

China	0–5	Brazil
	Report (TOCOG); Report (FIFA)	Marta 9', 74'; Debinha 22'; Andressa 82' (pen.); Beatriz 89'

Miyagi Stadium, Rifu
Attendance: 1,645
Referee: Kateryna Monzul (Ukraine)

24 July 2021
17:00

China	4–4	Zambia
Wang Shuang 6', 22', 23', 84' (pen.)	Report (TOCOG); Report (FIFA)	Kundananji 15'; Banda 43' (pen.), 46', 69'

Miyagi Stadium, Rifu
Attendance: 2,212
Referee: Melissa Borjas (Honduras)

27 July 2021
20:30

Netherlands	8–2	China
Van de Sanden 12'; Beerensteyn 37', 45+2'; Martens 47', 70'; Miedema 65', 76'; Pelova 71'	Report (TOCOG); Report (FIFA)	Wang Shanshan 28'; Wang Yanwen 69'

International Stadium Yokohama, Yokohama
Attendance: 0
Referee: Salima Mukansanga (Rwanda)

== Golf ==
China entered two male and two female golfers into the Olympic tournament.

Athlete	Event	Round 1	Round 2	Round 3	Round 4	Total		
Athlete	Event	Score	Score	Score	Score	Score	Par	Rank
Wu Ashun	Men's	72	71	67	66	276	−8	=32
Yuan Yechun	Men's	69	68	70	71	278	−6	=38
Feng Shanshan	Women's	74	64	68	67	273	−11	8
Lin Xiyu	Women's	71	66	69	68	274	−10	=9

== Gymnastics ==
=== Artistic ===
China fielded a full squad of four gymnasts each in both the men's and women's artistic gymnastics events by virtue of a top three finish in the team all-around at the 2018 World Artistic Gymnastics Championships in Doha, Qatar. Both teams were announced on 3 July 2021.

Men
Team

Athlete	Event	Qualification								Final							
Athlete	Event	Apparatus						Total	Rank	Apparatus						Total	Rank
Athlete	Event	F	PH	R	V	PB	HB	Total	Rank	F	PH	R	V	PB	HB	Total	Rank
Lin Chaopan	Team	13.966	14.100	13.433	14.666	14.733	14.200	85.098	12	13.166	—N/a		14.733	—N/a	14.133	—N/a	
Sun Wei	Team	14.333	14.833 Q	14.233	14.766	15.133	14.000	87.298	4 Q	14.366	15.000	14.233	14.866	14.800	14.200	—N/a	
Xiao Ruoteng	Team	14.866 Q	14.300	14.200	14.700	15.400	14.266	87.732	3 Q	14.600	14.166	14.366	14.733	14.933	14.333	—N/a	
Zou Jingyuan	Team	—N/a	14.600	—N/a		16.166 Q	—N/a				14.800	15.000	—N/a	15.466	—N/a	—N/a	
Total	Team	43.165	43.733	41.866	44.132	46.699	42.466	262.061	2 Q	42.132	43.966	43.599	44.332	45.199	42.666	261.894	3rd place, bronze medalist(s)

Individual finals

Athlete	Event	Qualification								Final							
Athlete	Event	Apparatus						Total	Rank	Apparatus						Total	Rank
Athlete	Event	F	PH	R	V	PB	HB	Total	Rank	F	PH	R	V	PB	HB	Total	Rank
Liu Yang	Rings	—N/a		15.300	—N/a			15.300	2 Q	—N/a		15.500	—N/a			15.500	1st place, gold medalist(s)
Sun Wei	All-around	See team results								14.500	14.966	14.066	14.900	14.966	14.400	87.798	4
Sun Wei	Pommel horse	—N/a	14.833	—N/a				14.833	6 Q	—N/a	13.066	—N/a				13.066	8
Xiao Ruoteng	All-around	See team results								14.700	14.700	14.533	14.700	15.366	14.066	88.065	2nd place, silver medalist(s)
Xiao Ruoteng	Floor	14.866	—N/a					14.866	7 Q	14.766	—N/a					14.766	3rd place, bronze medalist(s)
You Hao	Rings	—N/a		14.800	—N/a			14.800	8 Q	—N/a		15.300	—N/a			15.300	2nd place, silver medalist(s)
You Hao	Parallel bars	—N/a				15.666	—N/a	15.666	3 Q	—N/a				15.466	—N/a	15.466	4
Zou Jingyuan	Parallel bars	—N/a				16.166	—N/a	16.166	1 Q	—N/a				16.233	—N/a	16.233	1st place, gold medalist(s)

Women
Team

Athlete	Event	Qualification						Final					
Athlete	Event	Apparatus				Total	Rank	Apparatus				Total	Rank
Athlete	Event	V	UB	BB	F	Total	Rank	V	UB	BB	F	Total	Rank
Lu Yufei	Team	13.600	14.700 Q	14.100	12.666	55.066	14 Q	—N/a	13.333	13.966	13.166	—N/a	
Ou Yushan	Team	13.633	13.500	13.933	—N/a			12.700	13.233	—N/a		—N/a	
Tang Xijing	Team	14.300	14.433	14.333 Q	13.366	56.432	8 Q	12.600	14.500	13.733	12.866	—N/a	
Zhang Jin	Team	14.433	13.100	13.966	13.433	54.932	15	14.066	—N/a	13.900	13.133	—N/a	
Total	Team	42.366	42.633	42.399	39.465	166.863	3 Q	39.366	41.066	41.599	39.165	161.196	7

Individual finals

Athlete	Event	Qualification						Final					
Athlete	Event	Apparatus				Total	Rank	Apparatus				Total	Rank
Athlete	Event	V	UB	BB	F	Total	Rank	V	UB	BB	F	Total	Rank
Fan Yilin	Uneven bars	—N/a	14.600	—N/a		14.600	9 Q	—N/a	13.900	—N/a		13.900	7
Guan Chenchen	Balance beam	—N/a		14.933	—N/a	14.933	1 Q	—N/a		14.633	—N/a	14.633	1st place, gold medalist(s)
Lu Yufei	All-around	See team results						13.500	13.333	13.133	12.833	52.799	18
Lu Yufei	Uneven bars	—N/a	14.700	—N/a		14.700	=7 Q	—N/a	14.400	—N/a		14.400	4
Tang Xijing	All-around	See team results						14.233	14.233	13.066	12.966	54.498	7
Tang Xijing	Balance beam	—N/a		14.333	—N/a	14.333	2 Q	—N/a		14.233	—N/a	14.233	2nd place, silver medalist(s)

=== Rhythmic ===
China qualified a squad of rhythmic gymnasts for the group all-around by finishing in the top five at the 2019 World Championships in Baku, Azerbaijan.

Athletes	Event	Qualification				Final			
Athletes	Event	5 apps	3+2 apps	Total	Rank	5 apps.	3+2 apps	Total	Rank
Guo Qiqi; Hao Ting; Huang Zhangjiayang; Liu Xin; Xu Yanshu	Group	41.600	42.000	83.600	5 Q	42.150	42.400	84.550	4

=== Trampoline ===
China qualified one gymnast each for the men's and women's trampoline by finishing in the top eight, respectively, at the 2019 World Championships in Tokyo, Japan. China qualified the second spot in both men's and women's trampoline through the 2019–2020 Trampoline World Cup series. The athletes were announced on 9 June 2021.

Athlete	Event	Qualification		Final	
Athlete	Event	Score	Rank	Score	Rank
Dong Dong	Men's	111.650	5 Q	61.235	2nd place, silver medalist(s)
Gao Lei	Men's	62.820	14	Did not advance	
Liu Lingling	Women's	105.470	1 Q	56.350	2nd place, silver medalist(s)
Zhu Xueying	Women's	105.300	2 Q	56.635	1st place, gold medalist(s)

== Judo ==
China entered six female judoka into the Olympic tournament based on the International Judo Federation Olympics Individual Ranking.

Athlete	Event	Round of 32	Round of 16	Quarterfinals	Semifinals	Repechage	Final / BM	
Athlete	Event	Opposition Result	Opposition Result	Opposition Result	Opposition Result	Opposition Result	Opposition Result	Rank
Li Yanan	Women's −48 kg	Otgontsetseg (KAZ); W 10–00	Costa (POR); L 00–10	Did not advance				
Lu Tongjuan	Women's −57 kg	Mezhetskaia (ROC); W 10–01	Yoshida (JPN); L 00–10	Did not advance				
Yang Junxia	Women's −63 kg	Krssakova (AUT); L 00–10	Did not advance					
Sun Xiaoqian	Women's −70 kg	Teltsidou (GRE); L 00–10	Did not advance					
Ma Zhenzhao	Women's −78 kg	Graf (AUT); L 00–10	Did not advance					
Xu Shiyan	Women's +78 kg	Külbs (GER); W 10–00	Chikhrouhou (TUN); W 10–00	Ortiz (CUB); L 00–10	Did not advance	Altheman (BRA); W FUS	Kindzerska (AZE); L 00–10	5

== Karate ==
China entered two karateka into the inaugural Olympic tournament. 2018 Asian Games champion and world silver medalist Yin Xiaoyan (women's 61 kg) and Gong Li (women's +61 kg) qualified directly for their respective kumite categories by finishing among the top four karateka at the end of the combined WKF Olympic Rankings.

Athlete	Event	Group stage					Semifinals	Final	
Athlete	Event	Opposition Result	Opposition Result	Opposition Result	Opposition Result	Rank	Opposition Result	Opposition Result	Rank
Yin Xiaoyan	Women's −61 kg	Garces Sequera (VEN); W 2–0	Heurtault (FRA); W 1–0	Someya (JPN); W 4–2	Çoban (TUR); W 2S–2	1 Q	Farouk (EGY); W 1H–1	Preković (SRB); L 0–0H	2nd place, silver medalist(s)
Gong Li	Women's +61 kg	Abdelaziz (EGY); L 0–4	Matoub (ALG); W 4–0	Quirici (SUI); D 1–1	Abbasali (IRI); W 8–4	2 Q	Zaretska (AZE); L 2–7	Did not advance	3rd place, bronze medalist(s)

== Modern pentathlon ==
Chinese athletes qualified for the following spots to compete in modern pentathlon. Asian Games bronze medalist Luo Shuai and champion Zhang Mingyu confirmed places each in the men's and women's event, respectively, with the former finishing second and the latter fourth among those eligible for Olympic qualification at the 2019 Asia & Oceania Championships in Kunming.

Athlete	Event	Fencing (épée one touch)				Swimming (200 m freestyle)			Riding (show jumping)			Combined: shooting/running (10 m air pistol)/(3200 m)			Total points	Final rank
Athlete	Event	RR	BR	Rank	MP points	Time	Rank	MP points	Penalties	Rank	MP points	Time	Rank	MP points	Total points	Final rank
Li Shuhan	Men's	16	0	26	196	2:09.27	34	292	82.14	17	284	11:08.89	13	632	1404	22
Luo Shuai	Men's	18	0	18	208	2:04.08	21	302	82.65	30	249	10:54.13	4	646	1405	21
Zhang Mingyu	Women's	16	3	20	199	2:15.23	18	280	75.69	19	286	13:17.67	31	503	1268	25
Zhang Xiaonan	Women's	19	0	19	204	2:21.44	31	268	76.22	11	293	13:10.16	29	510	1275	22

== Rowing ==
China qualified eight boats for each of the following rowing classes into the Olympic regatta, with the majority of crews confirming Olympic places for their boats at the 2019 FISA World Championships in Ottensheim, Austria. Meanwhile, two more boats (women's four and women's eight) were awarded to the Chinese roster with a top-two finish at the 2021 FISA Final Qualification Regatta in Lucerne, Switzerland.

Men

Athlete	Event	Heats		Repechage		Semifinals		Final	
Athlete	Event	Time	Rank	Time	Rank	Time	Rank	Time	Rank
Liu Zhiyu; Zhang Liang	Double sculls	6:11.55	2 SA/B	Bye		6:23.11	2 FA	6:03.63	3rd place, bronze medalist(s)
Liu Dang; Yi Xudi; Zang Ha; Zhang Quan	Quadruple sculls	5:43.44	4 SA/B	5:56.86	3 FB	—N/a		5:46.07	7

Women

Athlete	Event	Heats		Repechage		Quarterfinals		Semifinals		Final	
Athlete	Event	Time	Rank	Time	Rank	Time	Rank	Time	Rank	Time	Rank
Jiang Yan	Single sculls	7:53.14	2 QF	Bye		8:00.01	3 SA/B	7:27.30	3 FA	7:21.33	6
Huang Kaifeng; Liu Jinchao	Pair	7:45.55	4 R	7:45.17	4	—N/a		Did not advance			
Liu Xiaoxin; Shen Shuangmei	Double sculls	7:03.78	4 R	7:21.93	4	—N/a		Did not advance			
Chen Yunxia; Cui Xiaotong; Lü Yang; Zhang Ling	Quadruple sculls	6:14.32	1 FA	Bye		—N/a				6:05.13	1st place, gold medalist(s)
Lin Xinyu; Lu Shiyu; Qin Miaomiao; Wang Fei	Four	6:38.54	2 FA	Bye		—N/a				6:25.13	5
Guo Linlin; Ju Rui; Li Jingjing; Miao Tian; Wang Zifeng; Wang Yuwei; Xu Fei; Zhang Min	Eight	6:10.77	3 R	5:55.69	3 Q	—N/a				6:01.21	3rd place, bronze medalist(s)

Qualification Legend: FA=Final A (medal); FB=Final B (non-medal); FC=Final C (non-medal); FD=Final D (non-medal); FE=Final E (non-medal); FF=Final F (non-medal); SA/B=Semi-finals A/B; SC/D=Semi-finals C/D; SE/F=Semi-finals E/F; QF=Quarter-finals; R=Repechage

== Rugby sevens ==
Summary

Team	Event	Pool round				Quarterfinal	Semifinal / Cl.	Final / BM / Pl.	
Team	Event	Opposition Result	Opposition Result	Opposition Result	Rank	Opposition Result	Opposition Result	Opposition Result	Rank
China women	Women's tournament	United States; L 14–28	Australia; L 10–26	Japan; W 29–0	3 Q	France; L 10–24	Classification 5–8; United States; L 14–33	Classification 7–8; ROC; W 22–10	7

=== Women's tournament ===
The China women's national rugby sevens team qualified for the Games by winning the silver medal and securing a lone outright berth at the 2019 Asian Olympic Qualifying Tournament in Guangzhou, marking the country's debut in the sport.

Team roster

- Women's team event – 1 team of 12 players

Group play

Pos	Team	Pld	W	D	L	PF	PA	PD	Pts	Qualification
1	United States	3	3	0	0	59	33	+26	9	Quarter-finals
2	Australia	3	2	0	1	86	24	+62	7	Quarter-finals
3	China	3	1	0	2	53	54	−1	5	Quarter-finals
4	Japan (H)	3	0	0	3	7	94	−87	3	

Source: Tokyo 2020 and World Rugby
Rules for classification: 1) Points; 2) Head-to-head result; 3) Point difference; 4) Points scored.
(H) Hosts

29 July 2021
10:00

United States	28–14	China
Try: Thomas 5' c Kirshe (2) 10' c, 12' c Canett 14' c Con: Heavirland (2/2) 6', 10'; Kelter (1/1) 13'; Canett (1/1) 14'	(Tokyo 2020)	Try: Wang 3' c Chen 14' +1 c Con: Chen (1/1) 4'; Yu (1/1) 14' +1

Tokyo Stadium, Tokyo

29 July 2021
17:30

Australia	26–10	China
Try: Williams 3' c Caslick 6' m Nathan 8' c Ashby 9' c Con: Williams (2/3) 3', 8'; Hinds (1/1) 9'	(Tokyo 2020)	Try: Yang 1' m Tang 13' m Con: Chen (0/1)

Tokyo Stadium, Tokyo

30 July 2021
10:00

China	29–0	Japan
Try: Xu (2) 1' c, 5' m Wang 2' c Tang 8' m Yang 13' m Con: Chen (2/4) 1', 2'; Yu (0/1)	(Tokyo 2020)

Tokyo Stadium, Tokyo

Quarter-final

30 July 2021
19:30 (Note: Matches were delayed by 30 minutes due to lightning in the area)

France	24–10	China
Try: Okemba (2) 4' c, 10' m Drouin 6' m Ciofani 9' c Con: Ulutule (2/2) 4', 9'; Drouin (0/1); Izar (0/1)	(Tokyo 2020)	Try: Tang (2) 1' m, 12' m Con: Chen (0/2)

Tokyo Stadium, Tokyo

Classification

31 July 2021
10:30

United States	33–14	China
Try: Thomas 1' c, 3' c Tapper 6' c Maher 10' m, 14' c Con: Heavirland (4/5) 1', 3', 7', 14'	(Tokyo 2020)	Try: Wang 1' c Chen 9' c Con: Chen (2/2) 2', 9'

Tokyo Stadium, Tokyo

31 July 2021
16:30

ROC	10–22	China
Try: Tiron 3' m Seredina 5' m Con: Seredina (0/2)	(Tokyo 2020)	Try: Wang 7' m Yang 8' c Xu 9' m Chen 12' m Con: Chen (1/4) 8'

Tokyo Stadium, Tokyo

== Sailing ==
Chinese sailors qualified one boat in each of the following classes through the 2018 Sailing World Championships, the class-associated Worlds, the 2018 Asian Games, and the continental regattas.

Men

Athlete	Event	Race													Net points	Final rank
Athlete	Event	1	2	3	4	5	6	7	8	9	10	11	12	M*	Net points	Final rank
Bi Kun	RS:X	7	9	16	4	13	~~26~~	1	3	2	4	2	6	8	75	3rd place, bronze medalist(s)
He Chen	Finn	16	14	14	~~17~~	16	15	9	14	15	11	—N/a		EL	124	15
Wang Yang; Xu Zangjun	470	~~15~~	11	13	8	11	14	4	15	14	5	—N/a		EL	95	13

Women

Athlete	Event	Race													Net points	Final rank
Athlete	Event	1	2	3	4	5	6	7	8	9	10	11	12	M*	Net points	Final rank
Lu Yunxiu	RS:X	2	9	~~25~~	2	2	1	4	2	1	2	3	2	6	36	1st place, gold medalist(s)
Zhang Dongshuang	Laser Radial	31	33	30	7	27	20	~~45~~	28	6	6	—N/a		EL	188	24
Wei Mengxi; Gao Haiyan	470	9	15	16	14	~~DSQ~~	18	11	15	14	17	—N/a		EL	129	18
Chen Shasha; Ye Jin	49erFX	20	19	17	~~DNF~~	DNS	14	DSQ	DSQ	DSQ	2	10	1	EL	171	19

Mixed

Athlete	Event	Race													Net points	Final rank
Athlete	Event	1	2	3	4	5	6	7	8	9	10	11	12	M*	Net points	Final rank
Hu Xiaoxiao; Yang Xuezhe	Nacra 17	13	19	14	15	16	15	16	~~20~~	16	14	14	15	EL	167	16

Legend: M = Medal race; EL = Eliminated – did not advance into the medal race; † – Discarded race not counted in the overall result

== Shooting ==
Chinese shooters achieved quota places for the following events by virtue of their best finishes at the 2018 ISSF World Championships, the 2019 ISSF World Cup series, and Asian Championships, as long as they obtained a minimum qualifying score (MQS) by 5 June 2021. To assure their nomination to the Olympic team, shooters must finish in the top two of each individual event at the Olympic Trials for rifle & pistol (March 16 to 25) in Guangzhou.

The rifle and pistol team was officially announced on March 29, 2021, featuring Beijing 2008 gold medalist Pang Wei (men's 10 m air pistol), Rio 2016 bronze medalist Li Yuehong (men's 25 m rapid fire pistol), and 2014 Youth Olympic men's air rifle champion Yang Haoran.

Men

Athlete	Event	Qualification		Final	
Athlete	Event	Points	Rank	Points	Rank
Li Yuehong	25 m rapid fire pistol	582	6 Q	26	3rd place, bronze medalist(s)
Lin Junmin	25 m rapid fire pistol	584	4 Q	12	6
Pang Wei	10 m air pistol	578	7 Q	217.6	3rd place, bronze medalist(s)
Sheng Lihao	10 m air rifle	629.2	8 Q	250.9	2nd place, silver medalist(s)
Yang Haoran	10 m air rifle	632.7	1 Q	229.4	3rd place, bronze medalist(s)
Yu Haicheng	Trap	123	5 Q	24	5
Zhang Bowen	10 m air pistol	586	2 Q	158.2	6
Zhang Changhong	50 m rifle 3 positions	1183	2 Q	466.0 WR	1st place, gold medalist(s)
Zhao Zhonghao	50 m rifle 3 positions	1173	11	Did not advance	

Women

Athlete	Event	Qualification		Final	
Athlete	Event	Points	Rank	Points	Rank
Chen Dongqi	50 m rifle 3 positions	1165	19	Did not advance	
Deng Weiyun	Trap	115	18	Did not advance	
Jiang Ranxin	10 m air pistol	587	1 Q	218.0	3rd place, bronze medalist(s)
Lin Yuemei	10 m air pistol	579	4 Q	176.6	5
Shi Mengyao	50 m rifle 3 positions	1171	9	Did not advance	
Wang Luyao	10 m air rifle	625.6	18	Did not advance	
Wang Xiaojing	Trap	117	11	Did not advance	
Wei Meng	Skeet	124	1 Q	46	3rd place, bronze medalist(s)
Xiao Jiaruixuan	25 m pistol	587	2 Q	29	3rd place, bronze medalist(s)
Xiong Yaxuan	25 m pistol	580	16	Did not advance	
Yang Qian	10 m air rifle	628.7	6 Q	251.8	1st place, gold medalist(s)
Zhang Donglian	Skeet	116	17	Did not advance	

Mixed

Athlete	Event	Qualification		Semifinal		Final	
Athlete	Event	Points	Rank	Points	Rank	Opposition Result	Rank
Sheng Lihao; Zhang Yu	10 m air rifle team	626.7	11	Did not advance			
Yang Haoran; Yang Qian	10 m air rifle team	633.2	1 Q	419.7	1 Q	Kozeniesky / Tucker (USA); W 17–13	1st place, gold medalist(s)
He Zhengyang; Wang Qian	10 m air pistol team	576	7 Q	380	6	Did not advance	
Pang Wei; Jiang Ranxin	10 m air pistol team	581	3 Q	387	1 Q	Chernousov / Batsarashkina (ROC); W 16–14	1st place, gold medalist(s)
Yu Haicheng; Wang Xiaojing	Trap team	144	9	—N/a		Did not advance	

== Skateboarding ==
China entered two skateboarder into the Olympic tournament. Zhang Xin was automatically selected among the top 16 eligible skateboarders in the women's park based on the World Skate Olympic Rankings of June 30, 2021.

Athlete	Event	Qualification		Final	
Athlete	Event	Result	Rank	Result	Rank
Zhang Xin	Women's park	28.16	15	Did not advance	
Zeng Wenhui	Women's street	12.31	6 Q	9.66	6

== Sport climbing ==
China entered two sport climbers into the Olympic tournament. 2018 Youth Olympic fifth-place finalist Pan Yufei and Song Yiling qualified directly each for the men's and women's combined event, respectively, by finishing in the top six of those eligible for qualification at the IFSC World Olympic Qualifying Event in Toulouse, France.

Athlete	Event	Qualification									Final								
Athlete	Event	Speed		Boulder		Lead			Total	Rank	Speed		Boulder		Lead			Total	Rank
Athlete	Event	Best	Place	Result	Place	Hold	Time	Place	Total	Rank	Best	Place	Result	Place	Hold	Time	Place	Total	Rank
Pan Yufei	Men's	7.59	20	1T3z 2 15	8	36	—	7	1120.00	14	Did not advance								
Song Yiling	Women's	7.46	3	0T1z 0 5	19	13+	—	18	1026.00	12	Did not advance								

== Swimming ==
Chinese swimmers further achieved qualifying standards in the following events (up to a maximum of 2 swimmers in each event at the Olympic Qualifying Time (OQT), and potentially 1 at the Olympic Selection Time (OST)): To assure their selection to the Olympic team, swimmers must finish in the top two of each individual pool event under the Olympic qualifying cut at the Chinese National Championships and Olympic Trials (April 30 to May 8, 2021) in Qingdao and at the Final Qualifying Event in Xi'an; or the first-place winners at the 2019 FINA World Championships, if they have reached the qualifying standards but failed to qualify in those domestic qualification events in any means.

Men

Athlete	Event	Heat		Semifinal		Final	
Athlete	Event	Time	Rank	Time	Rank	Time	Rank
Cheng Long	800 m freestyle	7:58.71	27	—N/a		did not advance	
Cheng Long	1500 m freestyle	15:18.71	24	—N/a		did not advance	
He Junyi	100 m freestyle	48.50	18	Did not advance			
Ji Xinjie	200 m freestyle	1:46.86	21	Did not advance			
Ji Xinjie	400 m freestyle	3:48.27	19	—N/a		did not advance	
Qin Haiyang	200 m breaststroke	DSQ		Did not advance			
Qin Haiyang	200 m individual medley	1:58.95	=26	Did not advance			
Sun Jiajun	100 m butterfly	51.74	16 Q	51.82	13	Did not advance	
Wang Shun	200 m individual medley	1:57.42	7 Q	1:56.22	1 Q	1:55.00 AS	1st place, gold medalist(s)
Wang Shun	400 m individual medley	4:10.63	10	—N/a		Did not advance	
Xu Jiayu	100 m backstroke	52.70	3 Q	52.94	6 Q	52.51	5
Xu Jiayu	200 m backstroke	1:57.76	15 Q	DNS		Did not advance	
Yan Zibei	100 m breaststroke	58.75	5 Q	58.72	4 Q	58.99	6
Yu Hexin	50 m freestyle	22.14	=19	Did not advance			
Hong Jinquan; Ji Xinjie; Wang Shun; Zhang Ziyang	4 × 200 m freestyle relay	7:08.27	9	—N/a		Did not advance	
He Junyi; Sun Jiajun; Xu Jiayu; Yan Zibei	4 × 100 m medley relay	3:31.72	4 Q	—N/a		DSQ	

Women

Athlete	Event	Heat		Semifinal		Final	
Athlete	Event	Time	Rank	Time	Rank	Time	Rank
Chen Jie	100 m backstroke	1:00.07	22	Did not advance			
Li Bingjie	200 m freestyle	1:59.03	20	Did not advance			
Li Bingjie	400 m freestyle	4:01.57	2 Q	—N/a		4:01.08	3rd place, bronze medalist(s)
Li Bingjie	800 m freestyle	8:22.49	10	—N/a		did not advance	
Li Bingjie	1500 m freestyle	15:59.92	10	—N/a		did not advance	
Liu Yaxin	200 m backstroke	2:08.36	5 Q	2:08.65	6 Q	2:08.48	8
Peng Xuwei	100 m backstroke	59.78	9 Q	59.98	12	Did not advance	
Peng Xuwei	200 m backstroke	2:09.03	7 Q	2:08.76	8 Q	2:08.26	7
Tang Muhan	400 m freestyle	4:04.07	8 Q	—N/a		4:04.10	5
Tang Qianting	100 m breaststroke	1:06.47	10 Q	1:06.63	10	Did not advance	
Wang Jianjiahe	800 m freestyle	8:20.58	8 Q	—N/a		8:21.93	5
Wang Jianjiahe	1500 m freestyle	15:41.49 AS	2 Q	—N/a		15:46.37	4
Wu Qingfeng	50 m freestyle	24.55	10 Q	24.32	=8 Q	24.32	=5
Wu Qingfeng	100 m freestyle	53.87	=18 Q	54.86	16	Did not advance	
Xin Xin	10 km open water	—N/a				2:00:10.1	8
Yang Junxuan	100 m freestyle	53.02	8 Q	DNS		Did not advance	
Yang Junxuan	200 m freestyle	1:56.17	6 Q	1:55.98	4 Q	1:55.01	4
Yu Jingyao	200 m breaststroke	2:23.17	8 Q	2:24.76	12	Did not advance	
Yu Liyan	200 m butterfly	2:08.36	3 Q	2:07.04	5 Q	2:07.85	6
Yu Yiting	200 m individual medley	2:10.22	8 Q	2:09.72	4 Q	2:09.57	5
Yu Yiting	400 m individual medley	4:41.64	11	—N/a		Did not advance	
Zhang Yufei	50 m freestyle	24.36	6 Q	24.32	=8	Did not advance	
Zhang Yufei	100 m butterfly	55.82	=1 Q	55.89	1 Q	55.64	2nd place, silver medalist(s)
Zhang Yufei	200 m butterfly	2:07.50	1 Q	2:04.89	1 Q	2:03.86 OR	1st place, gold medalist(s)
Ai Yanhan; Cheng Yujie; Wu Qingfeng; Zhu Menghui	4 × 100 m freestyle relay	3:35.07	6 Q	—N/a		3:34.76 AS	7
Dong Jie^{[a]} Li Bingjie; Tang Muhan; Yang Junxuan; Zhang Yifan^{[a]} Zhang Yufei	4 × 200 m freestyle relay	7:48.98	3 Q	—N/a		7:40.33 WR	1st place, gold medalist(s)
Chen Jie^{[a]} Peng Xuwei; Tang Qianting; Wu Qingfeng^{[a]} Yang Junxuan; Yu Yiting^{[a]} Zhang Yufei	4 × 100 m medley relay	3:57.70	8 Q	—N/a		3:54.13	4

Mixed

Athlete	Event	Heat		Final	
Athlete	Event	Time	Rank	Time	Rank
Xu Jiayu; Yan Zibei; Yang Junxuan; Zhang Yufei	4 × 100 m medley relay	3:42.29	3 Q	3:38.86	2nd place, silver medalist(s)

^{a} Swimmers who participated in the heats only.

== Table tennis ==
China entered six athletes into the table tennis competition at the Games. The men's and women's teams secured their respective Olympic berths by winning the gold medal each at the 2019 ATTU Asian Championships in Jakarta, Indonesia, permitting a maximum of two starters to compete each in the men's and women's singles tournament. Moreover, an additional berth was awarded to the Chinese table tennis players competing in the inaugural mixed doubles by advancing to the semifinal stage of the 2019 ITTF World Tour Grand Finals in Zhengzhou.

Men

Athlete	Event	Preliminary	Round 1	Round 2	Round 3	Round of 16	Quarterfinal	Semifinal	Final / BM	
Athlete	Event	Opposition Result	Opposition Result	Opposition Result	Opposition Result	Opposition Result	Opposition Result	Opposition Result	Opposition Result	Rank
Fan Zhendong	Singles	Bye			Lebesson (FRA); W 4–0	Freitas (POR); W 4–1	Jeoung Y-s (KOR); W 4–0	Lin Y-j (TPE); W 4–3	Ma L (CHN); L 2–4	2nd place, silver medalist(s)
Ma Long	Singles	Bye			Achanta (IND); W 4–1	Gauzy (FRA); W 4–1	Assar (EGY); W 4–1	Ovtcharov (GER); W 4–3	Fan Zd (CHN); W 4–2	1st place, gold medalist(s)
Fan Zhendong; Ma Long; Xu Xin	Team	—N/a				Egypt; W 3–0	France; W 3–0	South Korea; W 3–0	Germany; W 3–0	1st place, gold medalist(s)

Women

Athlete	Event	Preliminary	Round 1	Round 2	Round 3	Round of 16	Quarterfinal	Semifinal	Final / BM	
Athlete	Event	Opposition Result	Opposition Result	Opposition Result	Opposition Result	Opposition Result	Opposition Result	Opposition Result	Opposition Result	Rank
Chen Meng	Singles	Bye			Moret (SUI); W 4–0	Zhang M (CAN); W 4–1	Doo H K (HKG); W 4–2	Yu My (SGP); W 4–0	Sun Ys (CHN); W 4–2	1st place, gold medalist(s)
Sun Yingsha	Singles	Bye			Yang Xx (MON); W 4–0	Chen S-y (TPE); W 4–0	Han Y (GER); W 4–0	Ito (JPN); W 4–0	Chen M (CHN); L 2–4	2nd place, silver medalist(s)
Chen Meng; Sun Yingsha; Wang Manyu*	Team	—N/a				Austria; W 3–0	Singapore; W 3–0	Germany; W 3–0	Japan; W 3–0	1st place, gold medalist(s)

* On August 1, Liu Shiwen, originally set to compete in the women's team, was replaced by Wang Manyu after suffering a recurring elbow injury from the mixed doubles.

Mixed

Athlete	Event	Round of 16	Quarterfinal	Semifinal	Final / BM	
Athlete	Event	Opposition Result	Opposition Result	Opposition Result	Opposition Result	Rank
Xu Xin; Liu Shiwen	Doubles	Wang / Zhang (CAN); W 4–1	Ionescu / Szőcs (ROU); W 4–0	Lebesson / Yuan (FRA); W 4–0	Mizutani / Ito (JPN); L 3–4	2nd place, silver medalist(s)

== Taekwondo ==
China entered six athletes into the taekwondo competition at the Games. Rio 2016 flyweight champion Zhao Shuai (men's 68 kg), 2019 world champion Zhang Mengyu (women's 67 kg), and defending Olympic champion Zheng Shuyin (women's +67 kg) qualified directly for their respective weight classes by finishing among the top five taekwondo practitioners at the end of the WT Olympic Rankings.

Zhou Lijun scored a gold-medal victory over Great Britain's two-time defending champion Jade Jones to book an Olympic spot in the women's lightweight final (57 kg) of the 2019 World Grand Slam series. Meanwhile, double Olympic champion Wu Jingyu received a spare berth freed up by the World Grand Slam winner in the women's flyweight category (49 kg), as the next highest-placed taekwondo practitioner, not yet qualified, in the rankings, to round out the Chinese roster for her fourth straight Games.

Sun Hongyi completed the Chinese taekwondo roster by finishing in the top-two final of the men's heavyweight category (+80 kg) at the 2021 Asian Qualification Tournament in Amman, Jordan.

Athlete	Event	Qualification	Round of 16	Quarterfinals	Semifinals	Repechage	Final / BM	
Athlete	Event	Opposition Result	Opposition Result	Opposition Result	Opposition Result	Opposition Result	Opposition Result	Rank
Zhao Shuai	Men's −68 kg	Bye	Sediqi (EOR); W 22–20	Pié (DOM); W 13–8	Sinden (GBR); L 25–33	Bye	Lee D-h (KOR); W 17–15	3rd place, bronze medalist(s)
Sun Hongyi	Men's +80 kg	—N/a	Cho (GBR); W 7–4	Šapina (CRO); W 8–6	Larin (ROC); L 3–30 PTG	Bye	Alba (CUB); L 4–5	5
Wu Jingyu	Women's −49 kg	Bye	Pouryounes (EOR); W 24–3 PTG	Cerezo (ESP); L 2–33 PTG	Did not advance	Bogdanović (SRB); L 9–12	Did not advance	7
Zhou Lijun	Women's −57 kg	Bye	Adamkiewicz (POL); W 31–17	Alizadeh (EOR); L 8–9	Did not advance			
Zhang Mengyu	Women's −67 kg	—N/a	Tursunkulova (UZB); W 12–9	Gbagbi (CIV); L 9–21	Did not advance			
Zheng Shuyin	Women's +67 kg	—N/a	Ávila (HON); W 20–1	Laurin (FRA); L 6–14	Did not advance			

== Tennis ==
China entered five tennis players, all women, into the Olympic tournament. One singles player, Wang Qiang secured the outright berth by winning the women's singles title at the 2018 Asian Games in Jakarta. Besides Wang Qiang, China also entered two pairs of double players, Xu Yifan pairs with Yang Zhaoxuan, while Duan Yingying pairs with Zheng Saisai.

Athlete	Event	Round of 64	Round of 32	Round of 16	Quarterfinal	Semifinal	Final / BM	
Athlete	Event	Opposition Result	Opposition Result	Opposition Result	Opposition Result	Opposition Result	Opposition Result	Rank
Wang Qiang	Women's singles	Cepede Royg (PAR); W 6–3, 6–4	Muguruza (ESP); L 3–6, 0–6	did not advance				
Zheng Saisai	Women's singles	Osaka (JPN); L 1–6, 4–6	Did not advance					
Duan Yingying; Zheng Saisai	Women's doubles	—N/a	Plíšková / Vondroušová (CZE); L 2–6, 1–6	Did not advance				
Xu Yifan; Yang Zhaoxuan	Women's doubles	—N/a	Krunić / Stojanović (SRB); W 4–6, 6–4, [18–16]	Barty / Sanders (AUS); L 4–6, 4–6	Did not advance			

== Triathlon ==
China had entered one triathlete to compete at the Games.

Athlete	Event	Time						Rank
Athlete	Event	Swim (1.5 km)	Trans 1	Bike (40 km)	Trans 2	Run (10 km)	Total	Rank
Zhong Mengying	Women's	19:53	0:45	Lapped				

== Volleyball ==
=== Beach ===
==== Women's tournament ====
Chinese women's beach volleyball teams qualified directly for the Olympics after winning the gold medal at the 2018–2020 AVC Beach Volleyball Continental Cup final round in Nakhon Pathom, Thailand.

Athlete	Event	Preliminary round				Repechage	Round of 16	Quarterfinal	Semifinal	Final / BM	
Athlete	Event	Opposition Score	Opposition Score	Opposition Score	Rank	Opposition Score	Opposition Score	Opposition Score	Opposition Score	Opposition Score	Rank
Wang Fan; Xia Xinyi	Women's	Bansley / Wilkerson (CAN); W (18–21, 21–15, 15–11)	Ágatha / Duda (BRA); W (21–18, 21–14)	Gallay / Pereyra (ARG); W (21–14, 21–13)	1 Q	Bye	Ana Patrícia / Rebecca (BRA); L (14–21, 21–23)	Did not advance			
Wang Xinxin; Xue Chen	Women's	Klineman / Ross (USA); L (17–21, 19–21)	Keizer / Meppelink (NED); W (19–21, 31–29, 15–13)	Elsa / Liliana (ESP); W (21–13, 21–10)	2 Q	Bye	Artacho / Clancy (AUS); L (20–22, 13–21)	Did not advance			

=== Indoor ===
Summary

Team	Event	Group stage						Quarterfinals	Semifinals	Final / BM	
Team	Event	Opposition Score	Opposition Score	Opposition Score	Opposition Score	Opposition Score	Rank	Opposition Score	Opposition Score	Opposition Score	Rank
China women's	Women's tournament	Turkey; L 0–3	United States; L 0–3	ROC; L 2–3	Italy; W 3–0	Argentina; W 3–0	5	Did not advance			

==== Women's tournament ====
China women's volleyball team qualified for the Olympics by securing an outright berth as the highest-ranked nation for pool B at the Intercontinental Olympic Qualification Tournament in Ningbo.

Team roster

The China following is the Chinese roster.

Head coach: Lang Ping

- 1 Yuan Xinyue MB
- 2 Zhu Ting (c) OS
- 6 Gong Xiangyu OP
- 7 Wang Yuanyuan MB
- 9 Zhang Changning OS
- 10 Liu Xiaotong OS
- 11 Yao Di S
- 12 Li Yingying OS
- 16 Ding Xia S
- 17 Yan Ni MB
- 18 Wang Mengjie L
- 19 Liu Yanhan OS

Group play

Pos	Team	Pld	W	L	Pts	SW	SL	SR	SPW	SPL	SPR	Qualification
1	United States	5	4	1	10	12	7	1.714	418	401	1.042	Quarter-finals
2	Italy	5	3	2	10	11	7	1.571	409	377	1.085	Quarter-finals
3	Turkey	5	3	2	9	12	8	1.500	434	416	1.043	Quarter-finals
4	ROC	5	3	2	9	11	8	1.375	422	378	1.116	Quarter-finals
5	China	5	2	3	7	8	9	0.889	374	385	0.971	
6	Argentina	5	0	5	0	0	15	0.000	275	375	0.733	

Source: Tokyo 2020 and FIVB
Rules for classification: Tiebreakers

25 July 2021; 16:25	China	0–3	Turkey	Ariake Arena, Tokyo; Referees: Susana Rodríguez (ESP), Luis Macias (MEX)
25 July 2021; 16:25	(21–25, 14–25, 14–25); Results Statistics			Ariake Arena, Tokyo; Referees: Susana Rodríguez (ESP), Luis Macias (MEX)

27 July 2021; 11:05	China	0–3	United States	Ariake Arena, Tokyo; Referees: Wojciech Maroszek (POL), Fabrice Collados (FRA)
27 July 2021; 11:05	(27–29, 22–25, 21–25); Results Statistics			Ariake Arena, Tokyo; Referees: Wojciech Maroszek (POL), Fabrice Collados (FRA)

29 July 2021; 16:25	China	2–3	ROC	Ariake Arena, Tokyo; Referees: Daniele Rapisarda (ITA), Juraj Mokrý (SVK)
29 July 2021; 16:25	(17–25, 25–23, 25–20, 25–27, 12–15); Results Statistics			Ariake Arena, Tokyo; Referees: Daniele Rapisarda (ITA), Juraj Mokrý (SVK)

31 July 2021; 21:45	China	3–0	Italy	Ariake Arena, Tokyo; Referees: Shin Muranaka (JPN), Evgeny Makshanov (RUS)
31 July 2021; 21:45	(25–21, 25–20, 26–24); Results Statistics			Ariake Arena, Tokyo; Referees: Shin Muranaka (JPN), Evgeny Makshanov (RUS)

2 August 2021; 16:25	China	3–0	Argentina	Ariake Arena, Tokyo; Referees: Kang Joo-hee (KOR), Denny Cespedes (DOM)
2 August 2021; 16:25	(25–15, 25–22, 25–19); Results Statistics			Ariake Arena, Tokyo; Referees: Kang Joo-hee (KOR), Denny Cespedes (DOM)

== Water polo ==
Summary

Key:
- FT – After full time.
- P – Match decided by penalty-shootout.

Team	Event	Group stage					Quarterfinals	Semifinal / Cl	Final / BM / Pl	
Team	Event	Opposition Score	Opposition Score	Opposition Score	Opposition Score	Rank	Opposition Score	Opposition Score	Opposition Score	Rank
China women's	Women's tournament	ROC; L 17–18	United States; L 7–12	Japan; W 16–11	Hungary; W 11–9	4 Q	Spain; L 7–11	Classification 5–8; Netherlands; L 6–13	Classification 7–8; Canada; L 7–16	8

=== Women's tournament ===
China women's national water polo team qualified for the Olympics by winning the gold medal and securing an outright berth at the 2018 Asian Games in Jakarta, Indonesia.

Team roster

Head coach: (Montenegro) Petar Porobić

No.	Player	Pos.	L/R	Height	Weight	Date of birth (age)	Apps	OG/ Goals	Club	Ref
1	Peng Lin	GK	R	1.83 m (6 ft 0 in)	73 kg (161 lb)	4 April 1995 (aged 26)	108	1/0	(China) Hunan	
2	Wang Xinyan	CB	R	1.80 m (5 ft 11 in)	73 kg (161 lb)	26 April 1991 (aged 30)	126	1/2	(China) Shanghai	
3	Mei Xiaohan (C)	CB	R	1.81 m (5 ft 11 in)	100 kg (220 lb)	11 November 1996 (aged 24)	126	1/3	(China) Tianjin	
4	Xiong Dunhan	CF	R	1.79 m (5 ft 10 in)	83 kg (183 lb)	11 November 1998 (aged 22)	126	1/0	(China) Hunan	
5	Niu Guannan	D	R	1.78 m (5 ft 10 in)	68 kg (150 lb)	10 May 1992 (aged 29)	120	1/5	(China) Guangxi	
6	Zhai Ying	D	R	1.72 m (5 ft 8 in)		10 February 1996 (aged 25)	22	0/0	(China) Hunan	
7	Lu Yiwen	D	R	1.81 m (5 ft 11 in)		16 May 1996 (aged 25)	49	0/0	(China) Fujian	
8	Wang Huan	D	R	1.84 m (6 ft 0 in)		8 October 1997 (aged 23)	53	0/0	(China) Shanghai	
9	Deng Zewen	D	R	1.77 m (5 ft 10 in)		6 February 1997 (aged 24)	26	0/0	(China) Hunan	
10	Zhang Danyi	D	R	1.76 m (5 ft 9 in)	74 kg (163 lb)	23 January 1995 (aged 26)	81	0/0	(China) Shanghai	
11	Chen Xiao	CF	R	1.81 m (5 ft 11 in)		11 March 1999 (aged 22)	180	0/0	(China) Shanghai	
12	Zhang Jing	D	L	1.65 m (5 ft 5 in)	62 kg (137 lb)	16 June 1996 (aged 25)	121	1/2	(China) Fujian	
13	Shen Yineng	GK	R	1.88 m (6 ft 2 in)	80 kg (176 lb)	18 January 1995 (aged 26)	61	0/0	(China) Shanghai	
Average				1.79 m (5 ft 10 in)	77 kg (170 lb)	25 years, 210 days	92			

Note: Age as of 23 July 2021
Source: China Women | Tokyo 2020 Olympics Archived 2021-07-22 at the Wayback Machine

Group play

Pos	Team	Pld	W	D	L	GF	GA	GD	Pts	Qualification
1	United States	4	3	0	1	64	26	+38	6	Quarterfinals
2	Hungary	4	2	1	1	46	43	+3	5 (Note: ROC10–10 Hungary)	Quarterfinals
3	ROC	4	2	1	1	53	61	−8	5	Quarterfinals
4	China	4	2	0	2	51	50	+1	4	Quarterfinals
5	Japan (H)	4	0	0	4	44	78	−34	0	

Source: Tokyo 2020 and FINA
Rules for classification: 1) Points; 2) Head-to-head points; 3) Head-to-head goal difference; 4) Head-to-head goals scored; 5) Goal difference.
(H) Hosts
Notes:

24 July 2021; 19:50 v	Report	China	17–18	ROC	Tokyo Tatsumi International Swimming Center; Referees: Marie-Claude Deslières (CAN), Michiel Zwart (NED)
24 July 2021; 19:50 v	Report	Score by quarters: 6–5, 4–4, 4–5, 3–4			Tokyo Tatsumi International Swimming Center; Referees: Marie-Claude Deslières (CAN), Michiel Zwart (NED)
24 July 2021; 19:50 v	Report	Wang X. 4	Goals	Prokofyeva 4	Tokyo Tatsumi International Swimming Center; Referees: Marie-Claude Deslières (CAN), Michiel Zwart (NED)

26 July 2021; 14:00 v	Report	United States	12–7	China	Tokyo Tatsumi International Swimming Center; Referees: Alessandro Severo (ITA), Dion Willis (RSA)
26 July 2021; 14:00 v	Report	Score by quarters: 4–4, 2–2, 3–0, 3–1			Tokyo Tatsumi International Swimming Center; Referees: Alessandro Severo (ITA), Dion Willis (RSA)
26 July 2021; 14:00 v	Report	M. Fischer 3	Goals	Wang, Zhang J. 2	Tokyo Tatsumi International Swimming Center; Referees: Alessandro Severo (ITA), Dion Willis (RSA)

28 July 2021; 18:20 v	Report	China	16–11	Japan	Tokyo Tatsumi International Swimming Center; Referees: Marie-Claude Deslières (CAN), Viktor Salnichenko (KAZ)
28 July 2021; 18:20 v	Report	Score by quarters: 5–2, 4–3, 4–3, 3–3			Tokyo Tatsumi International Swimming Center; Referees: Marie-Claude Deslières (CAN), Viktor Salnichenko (KAZ)
28 July 2021; 18:20 v	Report	Zhang 5	Goals	Arima 3	Tokyo Tatsumi International Swimming Center; Referees: Marie-Claude Deslières (CAN), Viktor Salnichenko (KAZ)

1 August 2021; 14:00 v	Report	Hungary	9–11	China	Tokyo Tatsumi International Swimming Center; Referees: Viktor Salnichenko (KAZ), Frank Ohme (GER)
1 August 2021; 14:00 v	Report	Score by quarters: 1–4, 1–3, 2–1, 5–3			Tokyo Tatsumi International Swimming Center; Referees: Viktor Salnichenko (KAZ), Frank Ohme (GER)
1 August 2021; 14:00 v	Report	Gurisatti 4	Goals	four players 2	Tokyo Tatsumi International Swimming Center; Referees: Viktor Salnichenko (KAZ), Frank Ohme (GER)

Quarterfinal

3 August 2021; 15:30 v	Report	Spain	11–7	China	Tokyo Tatsumi International Swimming Center; Referees: Sébastien Dervieux (FRA), Michael Goldenberg (USA)
3 August 2021; 15:30 v	Report	Score by quarters: 5–2, 4–3, 2–1, 0–1			Tokyo Tatsumi International Swimming Center; Referees: Sébastien Dervieux (FRA), Michael Goldenberg (USA)
3 August 2021; 15:30 v	Report	Forca 4	Goals	Deng 2	Tokyo Tatsumi International Swimming Center; Referees: Sébastien Dervieux (FRA), Michael Goldenberg (USA)

Classification

5 August 2021; 14:00 v	Report	China	6–13	Netherlands	Tokyo Tatsumi International Swimming Center; Referees: Viktor Salnichenko (KAZ), György Kun (HUN)
5 August 2021; 14:00 v	Report	Score by quarters: 0–1, 2–5, 1–2, 3–5			Tokyo Tatsumi International Swimming Center; Referees: Viktor Salnichenko (KAZ), György Kun (HUN)
5 August 2021; 14:00 v	Report	Deng 2	Goals	Keuning 5	Tokyo Tatsumi International Swimming Center; Referees: Viktor Salnichenko (KAZ), György Kun (HUN)

7 August 2021; 09:30 v	Report	China	7–16	Canada	Tokyo Tatsumi International Swimming Center; Referees: Nicola Johnson (AUS), Asumi Tsuzaki (JPN)
7 August 2021; 09:30 v	Report	Score by quarters: 3–4, 2–5, 1–4, 1–3			Tokyo Tatsumi International Swimming Center; Referees: Nicola Johnson (AUS), Asumi Tsuzaki (JPN)
7 August 2021; 09:30 v	Report	Zhang J. 4	Goals	Christmas 4	Tokyo Tatsumi International Swimming Center; Referees: Nicola Johnson (AUS), Asumi Tsuzaki (JPN)

== Weightlifting ==
Chinese weightlifters qualified for eight quota places at the games, based on the Tokyo 2020 Rankings Qualification List of 11 June 2021.

Men

Athlete	Event	Snatch		Clean & Jerk		Total	Rank
Athlete	Event	Result	Rank	Result	Rank	Total	Rank
Li Fabin	−61 kg	141	1	172 OR	1	313 OR	1st place, gold medalist(s)
Chen Lijun	−67 kg	145	4	187 OR	1	332 OR	1st place, gold medalist(s)
Shi Zhiyong	−73 kg	166 OR	1	198 OR	1	364 WR	1st place, gold medalist(s)
Lü Xiaojun	−81 kg	170 OR	1	204 OR	1	374 OR	1st place, gold medalist(s)

Women

Athlete	Event	Snatch		Clean & Jerk		Total	Rank
Athlete	Event	Result	Rank	Result	Rank	Total	Rank
Hou Zhihui	−49 kg	94 OR	1	116 OR	1	210 OR	1st place, gold medalist(s)
Liao Qiuyun	−55 kg	97	3	126	2	223	2nd place, silver medalist(s)
Wang Zhouyu	−87 kg	120	1	150	1	270	1st place, gold medalist(s)
Li Wenwen	+87 kg	140 OR	1	180 OR	1	320 OR	1st place, gold medalist(s)

== Wrestling ==
China qualified eleven wrestlers for each of the following classes into the Olympic competition. Five of them finished among the top six to book Olympic spots in the men's freestyle 125 kg and women's freestyle (50, 53, 57 and 76 kg) at the 2019 World Championships, while six additional licenses were awarded to the Chinese wrestlers, who progressed to the top two finals of their respective weight categories at the 2021 Asian Qualification Tournament in Almaty, Kazakhstan.

Key:

- VT (ranking points: 5–0 or 0–5) – Victory by fall.
- VB (ranking points: 5–0 or 0–5) – Victory by injury (VF for forfeit, VA for withdrawal or disqualification)
- PP (ranking points: 3–1 or 1–3) – Decision by points – the loser with technical points.
- PO (ranking points: 3–0 or 0–3) – Decision by points – the loser without technical points.
- ST (ranking points: 4–0 or 0–4) – Great superiority – the loser without technical points and a margin of victory of at least 8 (Greco-Roman) or 10 (freestyle) points.
- SP (ranking points: 4–1 or 1–4) – Technical superiority – the loser with technical points and a margin of victory of at least 8 (Greco-Roman) or 10 (freestyle) points.

Freestyle

Athlete	Event	Round of 16	Quarterfinal	Semifinal	Repechage	Final / BM	
Athlete	Event	Opposition Result	Opposition Result	Opposition Result	Opposition Result	Opposition Result	Rank
Liu Minghu	Men's −57 kg	Abdullaev (UZB); L 1–3 ^{PP}	Did not advance				12
Lin Zushen	Men's −86 kg	Ambrocio (PER); W 4–0 ^{ST}	Punia (IND); L 1–3 ^{PP}	Did not advance			7
Deng Zhiwei	Men's −125 kg	Kozyrev (ROC); W 3–1 ^{PP}	Petriashvili (GEO); L 1–3 ^{PP}	Did not advance	Kamal (EGY); W 3–1 ^{PP}	Zare (IRI); L 0–3 ^{PO}	5
Sun Yanan	Women's −50 kg	Guzmán (CUB); W 3–1 ^{PP}	Livach (UKR); W 3–1 ^{PP}	Hildebrandt (USA); W 3–1 ^{PP}	Bye	Susaki (JPN); L 0–4 ^{ST}	2nd place, silver medalist(s)
Pang Qianyu	Women's −53 kg	Hérin (CUB); W 3–0 ^{PO}	Winchester (USA); W 3–1 ^{PP}	Kaladzinskaya (BLR); W 3–1 ^{PP}	Bye	Mukaida (JPN); L 1–3 ^{PP}	2nd place, silver medalist(s)
Rong Ningning	Women's −57 kg	Maroulis (USA); L 1–3 ^{PP}	Did not advance				10
Long Jia	Women's −62 kg	Miracle (USA); W 3–1 ^{PP}	Koliadenko (UKR); L 0–5 ^{VT}	Did not advance			9
Zhou Feng	Women's −68 kg	Sánchez (CUB); W 4–1 ^{SP}	Mensah (USA); L 0–4 ^{ST}	Did not advance	Dosho (JPN); L 1–3 ^{PP}	Did not advance	7
Zhou Qian	Women's −76 kg	Belinska (UKR); W 3–1 ^{PP}	Rotter-Focken (GER); L 1–3 ^{PP}	Did not advance	Marzaliuk (BLR); W 3–1 ^{PP}	Minagawa (JPN); W 5–0 ^{VT}	3rd place, bronze medalist(s)

Greco-Roman

Athlete	Event	Round of 16	Quarterfinal	Semifinal	Repechage	Final / BM	
Athlete	Event	Opposition Result	Opposition Result	Opposition Result	Opposition Result	Opposition Result	Rank
Walihan Sailike	Men's −60 kg	Kinsinger (GER); W 3–1 ^{PP}	Fumita (JPN); L 1–3 ^{PP}	Did not advance	Fergat (ALG); W 3–1 ^{PP}	Temirov (UKR); W 3–1 ^{PP}	3rd place, bronze medalist(s)
Peng Fei	Men's −87 kg	Sid Azara (ALG); L 1–4 ^{SP}	Did not advance				16

== See also ==
- China at the 2020 Summer Paralympics
