= Zhang Peng =

Zhang Peng may refer to:

- Zhang Peng (artist) (born 1981), Chinese artist
- Zhang Peng (sailor) (born 1981), Chinese sailor
- Zhang Peng (cyclist), Chinese cross-country mountain biker
- Zhang Peng (table tennis)
