= Zhang Xingjia =

Chinese equestrian

Personal information
- Nationality: Chinese
- Born: 12 January 1999 (age 26)

Sport
- Sport: Equestrian

Zhang Xingjia (born 12 January 1999) is a Chinese equestrian. He competed in the individual jumping event at the 2020 Summer Olympics.
