= Ding Xuan =

Chinese association football player

Personal information
- Date of birth: February 11, 1989 (age 37)
- Position: Goalkeeper

Team information
- Current team: Shanghai Shengli

Ding Xuan is a Chinese professional association football player plays as a goalkeeper for Shanghai Shengli. She was in the 2020 Summer Olympics.
