= Zhang Peng (artist) =

Chinese artist

Zhang Peng (Chinese: 張鵬; 1981 – ) is an artist based in Beijing.

Zhang was born in Shandong, China. He graduated from Wu Zuo Ren Art Secondary School in Beijing in 2001, and from the Central Academy of Fine Art in Beijing in 2005. He has a background in painting but has increasingly embraced photography. His work centres on images of young girls in deceptively innocent settings. He is an innocent and courageous artist who intends to capture the truths and contradictions of this world in his art.

Images of his work have appeared in Newsweek, The New York Times online and have appeared on the covers of numerous art magazines. He has recently exhibited at the Museum Of Contemporary Art in Shanghai, the Chosun Ilbo Museum in Seoul, and is the youngest artist in the inaugural Chinese Contemporary exhibition of the new Saatchi Museum in London.

== Photography ==
Zhang Peng changed his art from painting to photography in 2006. When asked why he converted to photography, the artist replied, "There is no special reason. When I changed my genre from painting to photography, many people were just like you. They were curious as to why I changed my media so suddenly and kept asking me why. However, all I wanted was to express many thoughts and emotions in my mind through more diversified means." He feels that photography can capture the moment of an event, while painting offers only a limited time to express all of ones thoughts. He makes flawless compositions, carefully arranged as theater sets and elaborately controls the lighting effects to create dramatic scenes. Computer manipulations are also used to make abnormally big eyes and slender bodies.

The red used in Zhang Peng's paintings and full-color photographs symbolize "either China itself or blood. As the national economy grows, each individual within it becomes relatively small. Red implies the meaning of this duality." He doesn't use red in his recent black-and-white photographs, but the omission of it seems to add brutality and subtlety to those pieces.

== Influence ==
Zhang Peng is determined and serious about his art. His works are different from the works of other artists of his age. The young artists of China born after 1980 grew up in relatively stable social circumstances after China's Cultural Revolution. However, they were still strongly influenced by their older generations. "The memory and influence of my family background and school education build the foundation of my art. My parents and schools were influenced by politics," said Zhang Peng. He describes his growth as happening in between the sudden advent of the market economy and the long tradition of socialism, which is as awkward as wearing clothing that does not fit. Zhang Peng's art conveys serious contemplation of his surroundings and the society in a way that is not found in the arts of other Chinese artists born after 1980.

== Theme ==
All of the young girls in Zhang Peng's artworks are delicate and helpless. Their big, sad eyes are filled with tears and seem to appeal to the audience. "Their indescribable expressions of hurt and vulnerability leave the viewer unsettled, disconcerted and heavy hearted." His intentions are to create a visual contradiction that represents the current problems in China due to the ever-growing modernization. One of those problems is the gross overpopulation of the country. Because of the one-child policy, families are being selective about the gender of their babies. Boys have traditionally been more desired. In order to ensure the birth of boy, families resort to a number of different methods, including having early-term abortions with the discovery of a girl fetus. Because of this, China now has the greatest difference in sex ratio, with males outnumbering females by 35 million (Timeinmoments.com, 1). Zhang Peng's image of girl dolls symbolizes the discrimination against young girls in China and the injustices they endure.

== Selected exhibitions ==
2008

Fascinating Beauty, Eli Klein Fine Art, New York

2007

Blooms of Frailty, Art Seasons, Beijing

Narrative, Fantasy, Future, Tang Contemporary Art, Bangkok

ARTSingapore 2007, Singapore

Art Cologne 2007, Cologne

Beijing CIGE

2006

Art Taipei 2006, Taipei, Taiwan

China International Gallery Exposition, Beijing

2005

ARTSingapore 2005, Singapore

Beijing International Triennium

Beijing International Art Camp, Studio Opening Exhibition, Beijing

2009

Fascinating Beauty Klein Sun Gallery, New York
