= Zhang Peng (cyclist) =

Chinese cross-country mountain biker

Personal information
- Born: 9 October 1996 (age 30)

Cycling career
- Sport: Cycling
- Discipline: Mountain bike
- Role: Rider
- Rider type: Cross-country

Zhang Peng (born 9 October 1996) is a Chinese cross-country mountain biker. He competed in the 2020 Summer Olympics.
