= Breaking at the 2024 Summer Olympics – Qualification =

This article details the qualifying phase for breaking at the 2024 Summer Olympics. The competition at these Games comprised a total of 32 breakers (16 B-Boys and 16 B-Girls) coming from their respective National Olympic Committees (NOCs) with a maximum of two per gender. All breakers must endure a tripartite qualifying route to earn a spot for the Games through the following tournaments: the 2023 WDSF World Championships, the continental championships (European Games, Asian Games, Pan American Games, African Championships, and Oceania Championships), and the four-month-long Olympic Qualifier Series.

== Summary ==
A total of 32 breakers (sixteen per gender) were to compete in the B-Boys and B-Girls dual battle for Paris 2024. Each NOC could only send a maximum of four breakers with an equal split between B-Boys and B-Girls. Quota places were allocated to the athletes by name. These qualification spots were to be awarded as follows:

- World Championships – The B-Boy and B-Girl champion at the 2023 WDSF World Championships, scheduled for 23 to 24 September in Leuven, Belgium, will obtain a quota place, respecting a two-breaker NOC limit per gender.
- Continental Qualification Events – The highest-ranked eligible B-Boy and B-Girl at each of the five continental qualifying tournaments (Africa, Asia, Europe, the Americas, and Oceania) will obtain a quota place, respecting a two-breaker NOC limit per gender. If two breakers from the same NOC dominate the WDSF World Championships and their respective continental qualification tournament, the former will qualify directly for the Games with the latter providing another opportunity to book another slot for his or her NOC through the Olympic Qualifier Series (OQS).
- Olympic Qualifier Series – The top seven B-Boys and B-Girls eligible for qualification after a four-month-long invitational series of events will obtain a quota place, respecting a two-breaker NOC limit.
- Host country – As the host country, France reserves one quota place each for the B-Boys and B-Girls events. If two French breakers for each gender qualify directly through any of the tripartite routes (world championships, continental meets, or Olympic Qualifier Series), the host country slots will be reallocated to the next highest-ranked eligible breaker from OQS.
- Universality places – Two invitational places will be available for eligible NOCs interested in having their breakers compete in Paris 2024 in keeping with the universality principle.

== Qualification summary ==
NOC	Men	Women	Total
Australia	1	1	2
Canada	1	0	1
China	1	2	3
Chinese Taipei	1	0	1
France	2	2	4
Italy	0	1	1
Japan	2	2	4
Kazakhstan	1	0	1
Lithuania	0	1	1
Morocco	1	1	2
Netherlands	2	1	3
Portugal	0	1	1
Refugee Olympic Team	0	1	1
South Korea	1	0	1
Ukraine	1	2	3
United States	2	2	4
Total: 16 NOCs	16	17	33

== Timeline ==
Event	Date	Venue
2023 WDSF African Championships	May 12–13, 2023	(Morocco) Rabat
2023 European Games	June 26–27, 2023	(Poland) Kraków
2023 WDSF World Breaking Championship	September 22–24, 2023	(Belgium) Leuven
2022 Asian Games	October 6–7, 2023	(China) Hangzhou
2023 WDSF Oceania Championship	October 27–28, 2023	(Australia) Sydney
2023 Pan American Games	November 3–4, 2023	(Chile) Santiago
2024 Olympic Qualifier Series	May 16–19, 2024; June 20–23, 2024	(China) Shanghai (Hungary) Budapest

== Events ==
=== B-Boys ===
Event	Places	Nation	Qualified breakdancer	Nickname
Host nation	1	France	Gaëtan Alin	Lagaet
2023 World Championships	1	United States	Victor Montalvo	Victor
2023 African Championships	1	Morocco	Bilal Mallakh	Billy
2023 European Games	1	France	Danis Civil	Dany Dann
2022 Asian Games	1	Japan	Shigeyuki Nakarai	Shigekix
2023 WDSF Oceania Championship	1	Australia	Jeffrey Dan Arpie	J Attack
2023 Pan American Games	1	Canada	Philip Kim	Phil Wizard
Olympic Qualifier Series	7	Netherlands	Lee-Lou Demierre	Lee
Olympic Qualifier Series	7	South Korea	Kim Hong-yul	Hong 10
Olympic Qualifier Series	7	Japan	Hiroto Ono	Hiro10
Olympic Qualifier Series	7	China	Qi Xiangyu	Lithe-ing
Olympic Qualifier Series	7	United States	Jeffrey Louis	Jeffro
Olympic Qualifier Series	7	Kazakhstan	Amir Zakirov	Amir
Olympic Qualifier Series	7	Netherlands	Menno van Gorp	Menno
Reallocated from unused universality places	2	Chinese Taipei	Sun Chen	Quake
Reallocated from unused universality places	2	Ukraine	Oleg Kuznietsov	Kuzya
Total	16			

=== B-Girls ===
Event	Places	Nation	Qualified breakdancer	Nickname
Host nation	1	France	Carlota Dudek	Señorita Carlota
2023 World Championships	1	Lithuania	Dominika Banevič	Nicka
2023 African Championships	1	Morocco	Fatima El-Mamouny	Elmamouny
2023 European Games	1	Netherlands	India Sardjoe	India
2022 Asian Games	1	China	Liu Qingyi	671
2023 WDSF Oceania Championship	1	Australia	Rachael Gunn	Raygun
2023 Pan American Games	1	United States	Sunny Choi	Sunny
Olympic Qualifier Series	7	Japan	Ami Yuasa	Ami
Olympic Qualifier Series	7	Japan	Ayumi Fukushima	Ayumi
Olympic Qualifier Series	7	France	Sya Dembélé	Syssy
Olympic Qualifier Series	7	United States	Logan Elanna Edra	Logistx
Olympic Qualifier Series	7	China	Zeng Yingying	Yingzi
Olympic Qualifier Series	7	Ukraine	Kateryna Pavlenko	Kate
Olympic Qualifier Series	7	Italy	Antilai Sandrini	Anti
Universality places	0	—N/a		
Invitational quota	1	Refugee Olympic Team	Manizha Talash	Talash
Reallocated from unused universality places	2	Portugal	Vanessa Cartaxo	Vanessa
Reallocated from unused universality places	2	Ukraine	Anna Ponomarenko	Stefani
Total	17			
