= Breaking at the 2024 Summer Olympics – B-Girls =

Breaking – B-Girls at the Games of the XXXIII Olympiad
- Venue: Place de la Concorde 1
- Date: 9 August 2024
- Competitors: 17 from 12 nations

Medalists
| 1st place, gold medalist(s) | | Ami Yuasa (Ami) | Japan |
| 2nd place, silver medalist(s) | | Dominika Banevič (Nicka) | Lithuania |
| 3rd place, bronze medalist(s) | | Liu Qingyi (671) | China |

The B-Girls breaking competition at the 2024 Summer Olympics took place on 9 August 2024.

== Pre-seeding ==
Pre-seeding was based on the WDSF World Ranking as of January 1, 2024.

1. Liu Qingyi (671) (CHN) (semifinals, bronze medalist)
2. Dominika Banevič (Nicka) (LTU) (final, silver medalist)
3. Ami Yuasa (Ami) (JPN) (champion, gold medalist)
4. Ayumi Fukushima (Ayumi) (JPN) (quarterfinals)
5. Anna Ponomarenko (Stefani) (UKR) (group stage)
6. Antilai Sandrini (Anti) (ITA) (group stage)
7. Sya Dembélé (Syssy) (FRA) (quarterfinals)
8. Sunny Choi (Sunny) (USA) (group stage)
9. Vanessa Marina (Vanessa) (POR) (group stage)
10. Logan Edra (Logistx) (USA) (group stage)
11. Fatima El-Mamouny (Elmamouny) (MAR) (group stage)
12. Kateryna Pavlenko (Kate) (UKR) (quarterfinals)
13. Carlota Dudek (Carlota) (FRA) (group stage)
14. Zeng Yingying (Ying Zi) (CHN) (quarterfinals)
15. Rachael Gunn (Raygun) (AUS) (group stage)
16. India Sardjoe (India) (NED) (semifinals, fourth place)
17. Manizha Talash (Talash) (EOR) (pre-qualifier)

== Results ==
=== Pre-qualifier battle ===
| Rank | Breaker (seed) | Nickname | Nation | Rounds | Votes | Notes |
|---|---|---|---|---|---|---|
| 1 | India Sardjoe (16) | India | Netherlands | 3 | 27 | Q |
| 2 | Manizha Talash (17) | Talash | Refugee Olympic Team | DSQ | DSQ | Talash was disqualified for displaying a political slogan during her performance. She wore a cape with the words "Free Afghan Women" |

=== Group stage ===
==== Group A ====
| Rank | Breaker (seed) | Nickname | Nation | Rounds | Votes | Notes |
|---|---|---|---|---|---|---|
| 1 | India Sardjoe (16) | India | Netherlands | 6 | 48 | Q |
| 2 | Liu Qingyi (1) | 671 | China | 4 | 33 | Q |
| 3 | Sunny Choi (8) | Sunny | United States | 2 | 15 | |
| 4 | Vanessa Marina (9) | Vanessa | Portugal | 0 | 12 | |

| Red Side | Score | Blue Side | Round 1 | Round 2 | Total Votes | Report |
|---|---|---|---|---|---|---|
| 671 (CHN) | 2-0 | Sunny (USA) | 8-1 | 8-1 | 16-2 | Report |
| Vanessa (POR) | 0-2 | India (NED) | 3-6 | 0-9 | 3-15 | Report |
| 671 (CHN) | 2-0 | Vanessa (POR) | 6-3 | 8-1 | 14-4 | Report |
| India (NED) | 2-0 | Sunny (USA) | 9-0 | 9-0 | 18-0 | Report |
| India (NED) | 2-0 | 671 (CHN) | 7-2 | 8-1 | 15-3 | Report |
| Vanessa (POR) | 0-2 | Sunny (USA) | 3-6 | 2-7 | 5-13 | Report |

==== Group B ====
| Rank | Breaker (seed) | Nickname | Nation | Rounds | Votes | Notes |
|---|---|---|---|---|---|---|
| 1 | Dominika Banevič (2) | Nicka | Lithuania | 5 | 42 | Q |
| 2 | Sya Dembélé (7) | Syssy | France | 4 | 33 | Q |
| 3 | Logan Edra (10) | Logistx | United States | 3 | 33 | |
| 4 | Rachael Gunn (15) | Raygun | Australia | 0 | 0 | |

| Red Side | Score | Blue Side | Round 1 | Round 2 | Total Votes | Report |
|---|---|---|---|---|---|---|
| Nicka (LTU) | 1-1 | Syssy (FRA) | 4-5 | 7-2 | 11-7 | Report |
| Logistx (USA) | 2-0 | Raygun (AUS) | 9-0 | 9-0 | 18-0 | Report |
| Nicka (LTU) | 2-0 | Logistx (USA) | 5-4 | 8-1 | 13-5 | Report |
| Raygun (AUS) | 0-2 | Syssy (FRA) | 0-9 | 0-9 | 0-18 | Report |
| Raygun (AUS) | 0-2 | Nicka (LTU) | 0-9 | 0-9 | 0-18 | Report |
| Logistx (USA) | 1-1 | Syssy (FRA) | 6-3 | 4-5 | 10-8 | Report |

==== Group C ====
| Rank | Breaker (seed) | Nickname | Nation | Rounds | Votes | Notes |
|---|---|---|---|---|---|---|
| 1 | Ami Yuasa (3) | Ami | Japan | 6 | 52 | Q |
| 2 | Zeng Yingying (14) | Ying Zi | China | 4 | 35 | Q |
| 3 | Antilai Sandrini (6) | Anti | Italy | 2 | 19 | |
| 4 | Fatima El-Mamouny (11) | Elmamouny | Morocco | 0 | 2 | |

| Red Side | Score | Blue Side | Round 1 | Round 2 | Total Votes | Report |
|---|---|---|---|---|---|---|
| Ami (JPN) | 2-0 | Anti (ITA) | 8-1 | 9-0 | 17-1 | Report |
| Elmamouny (MAR) | 0-2 | Ying Zi (CHN) | 0-9 | 0-9 | 0-18 | Report |
| Ami (JPN) | 2-0 | Elmamouny (MAR) | 9-0 | 9-0 | 18-0 | Report |
| Ying Zi (CHN) | 2-0 | Anti (ITA) | 8-1 | 8-1 | 16-2 | Report |
| Ying Zi (CHN) | 0-2 | Ami (JPN) | 1-8 | 0-9 | 1-17 | Report |
| Elmamouny (MAR) | 0-2 | Anti (ITA) | 0-9 | 2-7 | 2-16 | Report |

==== Group D ====
| Rank | Breaker (seed) | Nickname | Nation | Rounds | Votes | Notes |
|---|---|---|---|---|---|---|
| 1 | Kateryna Pavlenko (12) | Kate | Ukraine | 4 | 35 | Q |
| 2 | Ayumi Fukushima (4) | Ayumi | Japan | 4 | 31 | Q |
| 3 | Anna Ponomarenko (5) | Stefani | Ukraine | 4 | 30 | |
| 4 | Carlota Dudek (13) | Carlota | France | 0 | 12 | |

| Red Side | Score | Blue Side | Round 1 | Round 2 | Total Votes | Report |
|---|---|---|---|---|---|---|
| Ayumi (JPN) | 1-1 | Stefani (UKR) | 7-2 | 3-6 | 10-8 | Report |
| Kate (UKR) | 2-0 | Carlota (FRA) | 7-2 | 8-1 | 15-3 | Report |
| Ayumi (JPN) | 1-1 | Kate (UKR) | 1-8 | 5-4 | 6-12 | Report |
| Carlota (FRA) | 0-2 | Stefani (UKR) | 4-5 | 2-7 | 6-12 | Report |
| Carlota (FRA) | 0-2 | Ayumi (JPN) | 1-8 | 2-7 | 3-15 | Report |
| Kate (UKR) | 1-1 | Stefani (UKR) | 3-6 | 5-4 | 8-10 | Report |

=== Bracket ===
Quarterfinals
Syssy (FRA) | 1 | 0 | 1
Ami (JPN) | 8 | 9 | 8
Ayumi (JPN) | 5 | 3 | 2
India (NED) | 4 | 6 | 7
671 (CHN) | 6 | 5 | 9
Kate (UKR) | 3 | 4 | 0
Ying Zi (CHN) | 0 | 1 | 0
Nicka (LTU) | 9 | 8 | 9

Semifinals
Ami (JPN) | 3 | 6 | 8
India (NED) | 6 | 3 | 1
671 (CHN) | 2 | 5 | 2
Nicka (LTU) | 7 | 4 | 7

Gold medal battle
Ami (JPN) (gold) | 6 | 5 | 5
Nicka (LTU) (silver) | 3 | 4 | 4
Bronze medal battle
India (NED) | 3 | 0 | 5
671 (CHN) (bronze) | 6 | 9 | 4

== Final standing ==
| Rank | Athlete | Nickname |
|---|---|---|
| 1st place, gold medalist(s) | Ami Yuasa (JPN) | Ami |
| 2nd place, silver medalist(s) | Dominika Banevič (LTU) | Nicka |
| 3rd place, bronze medalist(s) | Liu Qingyi (CHN) | 671 |
| 4 | India Sardjoe (NED) | India |
| 5 | Ayumi Fukushima (JPN) | Ayumi |
| 6 | Kateryna Pavlenko (UKR) | Kate |
| 7 | Sya Dembélé (FRA) | Syssy |
| 8 | Zeng Yingying (CHN) | Ying Zi |
| 9 | Anna Ponomarenko (UKR) | Stefani |
| 10 | Logan Edra (USA) | Logistx |
| 11 | Antilai Sandrini (ITA) | Anti |
| 12 | Sunny Choi (USA) | Sunny |
| 13 | Vanessa Marina (POR) | Vanessa |
| 14 | Carlota Dudek (FRA) | Carlota |
| 15 | Fatima El-Mamouny (MAR) | Elmamouny |
| 16 | Rachael Gunn (AUS) | Raygun |
| DSQ | Manizha Talash (EOR) | Talash |

== See also ==
- Breaking at the 2024 Summer Olympics
