= Rachael Gunn =

Australian breakdancer (born 1987)

- Born: Rachael Louise Gunn; 2 September 1987 (age 39); Hornsby, New South Wales, Australia
- Other name: Raygun
- Spouse: Samuel Free (m. 2018)

Academic background
- Education: Macquarie University (BA, PhD)
- Thesis: Deterritorializing Gender in Sydney's Breakdancing Scene: A B-girl's Experience of B-boying (2017)
- Doctoral advisor: Diane Hughes

Academic work
- Discipline: Cultural studies
- Institutions: Macquarie University
- Main interests: Dance; youth cultures; gender and politics
- Website: www.raygunofficial.com

Rachael Louise Gunn (born 2 September 1987), known competitively as Raygun, is an Australian former academic and former competitive breakdancer. From 2020 to 2026 she was a lecturer in the Department of Media, Communications, Creative Arts, Language, and Literature at Macquarie University Faculty of Arts.

Gunn competed in breaking at the 2024 Summer Olympics, the sport's debut at the games. She was one of 17 b-girls from around the world to compete in the games. She received no votes from the judges in her three battles and did not progress past the preliminary round. After her performance, Gunn became the subject of widespread criticism for her unorthodox, conceptual style which Reuters described as "perplexing" and a "misfire".

== Early life and education ==
Rachael Louise Gunn was born on 2 September 1987 in Hornsby, New South Wales. She danced as a child, and was trained in ballroom, tap, and jazz styles. She has a brother, Brendan.

Gunn attended Barker College before enrolling at Macquarie University, where she completed a bachelor's degree in contemporary music in 2009 and a PhD in cultural studies in 2017. Her PhD thesis, titled Deterritorializing Gender in Sydney's Breakdancing Scene: A B-girl's Experience of B-boying, explored "the intersection of gender and Sydney's breaking culture". Her doctoral advisor was Diane Hughes.

== Dance career ==
=== Early career ===
Before breakdancing, Gunn practised jazz, tap, and ballroom dancing, and competed in the last. Her boyfriend, later husband, had been breakdancing for 10 years and encouraged her to try it. She began breakdancing in the early 2010s when she was in her mid-twenties. Gunn paused her competitive breakdancing career to complete her PhD, returning to competitions in 2018.

Gunn performs under the nickname Raygun, a portmanteau of Rachael Gunn, which is sometimes prefixed with the descriptor b-girl. She is coached by her husband, Samuel Free, and says that she trains three to four hours a day. Gunn ranked second in the Australian Open B-girl Ranking in 2022 and topped the ranking in 2023 in Australia as well as winning or coming in the top three at many Australian breaking events in the previous five to ten years. She represented Australia at the World Breaking Championships in Paris (2021), Seoul (2022), and Leuven (2023). In 2023, she won the Oceania Breaking Championships, defeating Molly Chapman ("Holy Molly") in the final, and secured her spot in the 2024 Summer Olympics according to the qualifying rules.

=== 2024 Olympics ===
In the breaking event at the 2024 Summer Olympics, Gunn received zero votes from the judges in her three round-robin battles against her opponents, losing 18–0 in all three rounds. (Note: A note on judging: "A panel of nine judges score each battle and every round based on five criteria: technique, vocabulary, execution, musicality and originality. Each category accounts for 20% of the final score. Judges use a digital slider to score battles. The slider shifts in real-time toward the breaker who is outperforming the opposing dancer in a specific category". Each round leaves one of the dancers victorious. For a fuller explanation of how points are allocated, see Breakdancing rules format moves, here or the official Breaking Results book.) She was eliminated at the round-robin stage after being beaten by Logistx (US), Syssy (France), and Nicka (Lithuania). Gunn was widely criticised and mocked for what many perceived as an amateurish and disrespectful performance, which Stuart Heritage of The Guardian compared to "thrashing around like a toddler having a tantrum in the supermarket." Her outfit was also ridiculed and compared to that of a school teacher for exercise classes. In response, Gunn shared a quote on Instagram on 8 August: "don't be afraid to be different, go out there and represent yourself, you never know where that's gonna take you". She said she could not compete athletically with her younger rivals, and said she instead wanted to "move differently, be artistic and creative. ... I was always the underdog and wanted to make my mark in a different way".

Team Australia's Chef de Mission, Anna Meares, later issued a statement supporting Gunn and condemning what she called "trolls and keyboard warriors". Martin Gilian, the Head Olympic breaking judge, said that Raygun had done exactly what breaking is supposed to be about: "originality and bringing something new to the table and representing your country or region," which he said she achieved with her kangaroo hop. He claimed the breaking community stood behind her. The World DanceSport Federation also offered the support of their safeguarding officer in case Gunn was experiencing mental health problems due to the media attention.

Gunn's breaking performances were satirised by Rachel Dratch on The Tonight Show Starring Jimmy Fallon. Later, false rumours spread that Gunn's husband, Free, was a national coach involved in the Australian team selection and a judge in the Oceania Breaking Championships through which Gunn qualified. However, the Oceania qualifier did not have Free nor any other Australians on its judging panel, used the same rules as the Paris games, and was open to everyone.

An anonymous petition on Change.org, calling for an investigation into the conduct of Gunn, Anna Meares, and the selection process, garnered thousands of signatures. This petition called for an apology from Gunn and Meares, suggesting Gunn's conduct at the games was "unethical", and falsely accusing her of "manipulating the selection process". The Australian Olympic Committee (AOC) chief executive Matt Carroll demanded the petition be withdrawn, saying it amounted to "bullying and harassment and is defamatory" and that the AOC was especially offended by the insult to Meares. It stated that the Australian selection was made by nine independent international judges and that Gunn was nominated legitimately by DanceSport Australia to the AOC for selection. Gunn is not any kind of officeholder with AUSBreaking nor DanceSport, and no athlete appealed against her selection. The petition was withdrawn by Change.org on 15 August 2024. Other online bullying included "violent messages", often based on rumours spread online.

On the same day, Gunn posted a video on social media talking about the effect the criticism on social media had had on her and her family and asked the media to stop harassing her family, friends, and the Australian and broader breaking community. She said she had taken her entry seriously and worked hard to prepare. The hip hop community, which is small in Australia, was divided in their opinions of her performance, but condemned the bullying, which also led to further harassment of local Australian b-girls, including insults and violent threats in private messages.

=== Post-Olympics and retirement ===
In September 2024, she became ranked the World's Number One by the World DanceSport Federation, largely because many participants' ranking points had recently expired and because the Olympics and its qualifying circuit events were not counted in the rankings. News.com.au reported in October 2024 that though Gunn gained substantial notoriety at the Olympics for herself and for the sport, other national and international competitors have been trying to distance themselves from her.

On 6 November 2024, Gunn announced her retirement from competitive breaking, citing the response to her Olympic performance. She stated that the prospect of being scrutinised by so many online changed her experience of competing, and said she would henceforth dance mostly for personal enjoyment.

== Legal issues ==
Raygun: The Musical, a theatre work about Gunn's contentious Olympics performance, was scheduled to debut in Sydney on 7 December 2024. The show was cancelled after legal threats by Gunn's lawyers, who claimed her name and kangaroo hop were intellectual property. Sydney comedian Steph Broadbridge, the creator and star of the production, observed that the kangaroo dance was: "an Olympic-level dance. How would I possibly be able to do that without any formal breakdancing training?" Gunn claimed to have been "blindsided" after learning about the show through the media. By 20 December, the issue had been resolved and Broadbridge continued developing the show. Gunn's legal threats were worked into the revised version of the show, entitled Breaking: The Musical, which then played to larger audiences. Matt Reigle of OutKick cited the incident as an example of the Streisand effect.

A trademark application for the silhouette of Gunn doing the kangaroo pose was submitted by her legal team on the same day that the show was first promoted with the same image, on 25 September 2024. A trademark application for the name "Raygun" was stalled with an "adverse report" issued by authorities in October 2024.

== Academic career ==
From 2017 to 2020, Gunn served as a teaching fellow at Macquarie University Faculty of Arts in the Department of Media, Communications, Creative Arts, Language, and Literature. From 2020 until February 2026 Gunn was a full-time lecturer in the department, until she took a "voluntary redundancy". Gunn noted that she "had seen 'the writing on the wall,'" and that "We need to have a serious conversation about higher education" in Australia.

She was a member of the Macquarie University Performance and Expertise Research Centre.

Her research focuses on breakdancing, street dance, hip-hop, youth culture, and gender in politics.

== Documentary ==
A Netflix documentary about Gunn's Olympic performance and its aftermath, titled Untold Raygun: Breaking Badly, was aired in September 2026. Guardian reviewer Stuart Heritage gave it 4 out of 5 stars, saying Gunn came across as charismatic and vulnerable for discussing her worries and shortcomings.

== Personal life ==
Gunn met her husband Samuel Free, a fellow breakdancer, at university in 2008. They married in January 2018.

== Select publications ==
=== Journal articles ===
- Gunn, Rachael (2016). "The 'systems of relay' in doing cultural studies: experimenting with the 'Body without Organs' in b-girling practice". Continuum. 30 (2): 183–194. doi:10.1080/10304312.2016.1143194. ISSN 1030-4312.
- Gunn, Rachael (2022). "Where the #bgirls at? politics of (in)visibility in breaking culture". Feminist Media Studies. 22 (6): 1447–1462. doi:10.1080/14680777.2021.1890182. ISSN 1468-0777.

=== Book chapters ===
- Gunn, Rachael (2019). "Nocturnal Paradox: How Breakdancing Reveals the Potentials of the Night". In Stahl, Geoff; Bottà, Giacomo (eds.). Nocturnes: Popular Music and the Night. Pop Music, Culture and Identity. Cham: Palgrave Macmillan. pp. 147–162. doi:10.1007/978-3-319-99786-5. ISBN 978-3-319-99785-8.
- Gunn, Rachael (2024). "'In a Good Way There's No Beef, but the Bad Thing is There's No Beef': Tensions and Changing Cultural Politics in Sydney's Breaking Scene". In Sudiipta Dowsett; Lucas Marie; Dianne Rodger; Grant Leigh Saunders (eds.). Representing Hip Hop Histories, Politics and Practices in Australia. London: Routledge.

== See also ==
- Breakdancing in Australia
- Concerns and controversies at the 2024 Summer Olympics
