= Lithuania at the 2024 Summer Olympics =

- IOC code: LTU
- NOC: Lithuanian National Olympic Committee
- Website: www.ltok.lt (in Lithuanian and English)

in Paris, France 26 July 2024 – 11 August 2024
- Competitors: 51 (27 men and 24 women) in 13 sports
- Flag bearers (opening): Justina Vanagaitė & Rytis Jasiūnas
- Flag bearer (closing): Dominika Banevič
- Medals Ranked 70th: Gold 0 Silver 2 Bronze 2 Total 4

Summer Olympics appearances (overview)
- 1924; 1928; 1932–1988; 1992; 1996; 2000; 2004; 2008; 2012; 2016; 2020; 2024; 2028

Other related appearances
- Russian Empire (1908–1912); Soviet Union (1952–1988)

Lithuania competed at the 2024 Summer Olympics in Paris from 26 July to 11 August. This marked the nation's ninth consecutive appearance at the Games in the post-Soviet era and its eleventh overall in Summer Olympic history.

Lithuania left Paris with four medals (two silver and two bronze), failing to secure a gold for the fifth time in its Olympic history.

== Medalists ==
Medal	Name	Sport	Event	Date
Silver	Mykolas Alekna	Athletics	Men's discus throw	7 August
Silver	Dominika Banevič	Breaking	B-Girls	9 August
Bronze	Viktorija Senkutė	Rowing	Women's single sculls	3 August
Bronze	Evaldas Džiaugys; Gintautas Matulis; Aurelijus Pukelis; Šarūnas Vingelis	Basketball	Men's 3x3	5 August

Medals by sport
Sport	1st place, gold medalist(s)	2nd place, silver medalist(s)	3rd place, bronze medalist(s)	Total
Athletics	0	1	0	1
Breaking	0	1	0	1
Basketball	0	0	1	1
Rowing	0	0	1	1
Total	0	2	2	4

Medals by gender
Gender	1st place, gold medalist(s)	2nd place, silver medalist(s)	3rd place, bronze medalist(s)	Total
Male	0	1	1	2
Female	0	1	1	2
Mixed	0	0	0	0
Total	0	2	2	4

Medals by date
Date	1st place, gold medalist(s)	2nd place, silver medalist(s)	3rd place, bronze medalist(s)	Total
03 August	0	0	1	1
05 August	0	0	1	1
07 August	0	1	0	1
09 August	0	1	0	1
Total	0	2	2	4

== Competitors ==
The following is a list of the number of competitors in the Games:

Sport	Men	Women	Total
Athletics	4	7	11
Basketball	4	0	4
Breaking	0	1	1
Canoeing	5	0	5
Cycling	1	2	3
Equestrian	1	1	2
Gymnastics	1	0	1
Modern pentathlon	0	2	2
Rowing	3	5	8
Sailing	1	1	2
Swimming	5	2	7
Volleyball	0	2	2
Wrestling	2	1	3
Total	27	24	51

== Athletics ==
Lithuanian track and field athletes qualified for Paris 2024 by meeting the entry standards, either by surpassing the direct qualifying mark (or time for track and road events) or through world rankings. The following events had a maximum of three athletes per event:

Key

- Note–Ranks given for track events are within the athlete's heat only
- Q = Qualified for the next round
- q = Qualified for the next round as a fastest loser or, in field events, by position without achieving the qualifying target
- NR = National record
- N/A = Round not applicable for the event
- Bye = Athlete not required to compete in round

Track and road events

Athlete	Event	Heat		Repechage		Semifinal		Final	
Athlete	Event	Result	Rank	Result	Rank	Result	Rank	Result	Rank
Modesta Morauskaitė	Women's 400 m	52.00 SB	8	51.33 SB	4	Did not advance			
Gabija Galvydytė	Women's 800 m	1:59.18 PB	4	2:00.66	4	Did not advance			

Field events
Men

Athlete	Event	Qualification		Final	
Athlete	Event	Distance	Position	Distance	Position
Mykolas Alekna	Discus throw	67.47	1 Q	69.97	2nd place, silver medalist(s)
Andrius Gudžius	Discus throw	64.07	10 Q	66.55	8
Martynas Alekna	Discus throw	58.66	28	Did not advance	
Edis Matusevičius	Javelin throw	79.40	21	Did not advance	

Women

Athlete	Event	Qualification		Final	
Athlete	Event	Distance	Position	Distance	Position
Ieva Gumbs	Discus throw	60.37	22	Did not advance	
Airinė Palšytė	High jump	1.88	15	Did not advance	
Dovilė Kilty	Triple jump	13.64	25	Did not advance	
Diana Zagainova	Triple jump	12.86	30	Did not advance	
Liveta Jasiūnaitė	Javelin throw	58.35	25	Did not advance	

== Basketball ==
=== 3×3 basketball ===
Summary

Team	Event	Group stage								Quarterfinal	Semifinal	Final / BM	
Team	Event	Opposition Score	Opposition Score	Opposition Score	Opposition Score	Opposition Score	Opposition Score	Opposition Score	Rank	Opposition Score	Opposition Score	Opposition Score	Rank
Lithuania men's	Men's tournament	Latvia; L 14–21	France; L 20–21	Poland; W 21–12	United States; W 20–18	China; W 21–16	Netherlands; L 18–19	Serbia; W 20–18	3	Poland; W 21–15	Netherlands; L 9–20	Latvia; W 21–18	3rd place, bronze medalist(s)

==== Men's tournament ====
The Lithuanian men's 3x3 basketball team qualified for the Olympics by securing a top-three finish at the 2024 FIBA Olympic Qualifying Tournament in Debrecen, Hungary.

Team roster

The roster was announced on 11 July 2024.

- Evaldas Džiaugys
- Gintautas Matulis
- Aurelijus Pukelis
- Šarūnas Vingelis

Group play

Pos	Team	Pld	W	L	PF	PA	PD	Qualification
1	Latvia	7	7	0	147	103	+44	Semifinals
2	Netherlands	7	5	2	133	112	+21	Semifinals
3	Lithuania	7	4 (Note: Lithuania 20–18 Serbia)	3	134	125	+9	Play-ins
4	Serbia	7	4	3	129	123	+6	Play-ins
5	France (H)	7	3	4	131	132	−1	Play-ins
6	Poland	7	2 (Note: United States 17–19 Poland)	5	116	139	−23	Play-ins
7	United States	7	2	5	116	138	−22	
8	China	7	1	6	107	141	−34	

Source: FIBA
Rules for classification: 1) Wins; 2) Head-to-head record; 3) Points scored.
(H) Hosts
Notes:

30 July 2024
18:35
v

Boxscore

Latvia	21–14	Lithuania
Pts: Miezis 9		Pts: Pukelis 8

Place de la Concorde, Paris
Referees: Marek Maliszewski (POL), Jasmina Juras (SRB)

31 July 2024
22:05
v

Boxscore

Lithuania	20–21	France
Pts: Džiaugys, Pukelis 7		Pts: Rambaut 9

Place de la Concorde, Paris
Referees: Edmond Ho (HKG), Shi Qirong (CHN)

1 August 2024
13:25
v

Boxscore

Lithuania	21–12	Poland
Pts: Džiaugys 10		Pts: Bogucki 6

Place de la Concorde, Paris
Referees: Markos Michaelides (SUI), Deanna Jackson (USA)

1 August 2024
19:05
v

Boxscore

United States	18–20	Lithuania
Pts: Barry 9		Pts: Pukelis 7

Place de la Concorde, Paris
Referees: Edmond Ho (HKG), Najib Chajiddine (FRA)

2 August 2024
10:05
v

Boxscore

Lithuania	21–16	China
Pts: Džiaugys 9		Pts: Zhao 6

Place de la Concorde, Paris
Referees: Marek Maliszewski (POL), Brigitta Csabai-Kaskötő (HUN)

2 August 2024
13:25
v

Boxscore

Netherlands	19–18	Lithuania
Pts: De Jong 6		Pts: Pukelis 7

Place de la Concorde, Paris
Referees: Deanna Jackson (USA), Jasmina Juras (SRB)

4 August 2024
18:35
v

Boxscore

Lithuania	20–18	Serbia
Pts: Pukelis 10		Pts: Majstorović 10

Place de la Concorde, Paris
Referees: Markos Michaelides (SUI), Vlad Ghizdareanu (ROU)

Play-in

4 August 2024
21:30
v

Boxscore

Lithuania	21–15	Poland
Pts: Džiaugys, Vingelis 9		Pts: Sokołowski 7

Place de la Concorde, Paris
Referees: Jasmina Juras (SRB), Najib Chajiddine (FRA)

Semifinal

5 August 2024
18:00
v

Boxscore

Netherlands	20–9	Lithuania
Pts: De Jong 8		Pts: Pukelis 4

Place de la Concorde, Paris
Referees: Markos Michaelides (SUI), Deanna Jackson (USA)

Bronze medal game

5 August 2024
21:30
v

Boxscore

Latvia	18–21	Lithuania
Pts: Lasmanis 9		Pts: Vingelis 9

Place de la Concorde, Paris
Referees: Markos Michaelides (SUI), Deanna Jackson (USA)

== Breaking ==
Lithuania entered a breakdancer to compete in the B-Girl dual battles at Paris 2024. Dominika Banevič (Nicka) qualified for the Games by winning a gold medal at the 2023 World Championships in Leuven, Belgium.

Athlete	Nickname	Event	Round-robin		Quarterfinal	Semifinal	Final / BM	
Athlete	Nickname	Event	Votes	Rank	Opposition Result	Opposition Result	Opposition Result	Rank
Dominika Banevič	Nicka	B-Girls	42	1 Q	Ying Zi (CHN); W 3 (26)–0 (1)	671 (CHN); W 2 (18)–1 (9)	Ami (JPN); L 0 (11)–3 (16)	2nd place, silver medalist(s)

== Canoeing ==
=== Sprint ===
Lithuanian canoeists qualified two boats in the following distances for the Games through the 2023 ICF Canoe Sprint World Championships in Duisburg, Germany. National trials held in April 2024 determined the athletes representing Lithuania at the Olympics.

Athlete	Event	Heats		Quarterfinals		Semifinals		Final	
Athlete	Event	Time	Rank	Time	Rank	Time	Rank	Time	Rank
Andrej Olijnik	Men's K-1 1000 m	3:38.02	4 QF	3:36.72	4	Did not advance			20
Mindaugas Maldonis; Andrej Olijnik	Men's K-2 500 m	1:31.27	4 QF	1:30.30	5	Did not advance			19
Simonas Maldonis; Mindaugas Maldonis; Ignas Navakauskas; Artūras Seja	Men's K-4 500 m	1:21.51	3 QF	1:21.09	6 SF	1:21.27	3 FA	1:21.13	5

Qualification Legend: FA – Qualify to final (medal); FB – Qualify to final B (non-medal); SF – Qualify to Semifinals; QF – Qualify to Quarterfinals

== Cycling ==
=== Road ===
Lithuania entered one female rider to compete in the road race events at the Olympics through the reallocation of unused quota places based on the UCI Nation Ranking.

Athlete	Event	Time	Rank
Rasa Leleivytė	Women's road race	4:04:23	20

=== Track ===
Lithuania entered two riders in the following track events, based on their performances in the final UCI Olympic rankings.

Sprint

Athlete	Event	Qualification		Round 1	Repechage 1	Round 2	Repechage 2	Round 3	Repechage 3	Quarterfinals	Semifinals	Finals / BM	
Athlete	Event	Time Speed (km/h)	Rank	Opposition Time Speed (km/h)	Opposition Time Speed (km/h)	Opposition Time Speed (km/h)	Opposition Time Speed (km/h)	Opposition Time Speed (km/h)	Opposition Time Speed (km/h)	Opposition Time Speed (km/h)	Opposition Time Speed (km/h)	Opposition Time Speed (km/h)	Rank
Vasilijus Lendel	Men's sprint	9.581; 75.149	19 Q	Hoogland (NED); L 10.055; 72.486	Sahrom (MAS); Dakin (NZL); W 9.824; 73.290	Richardson (AUS); L 10.339; 75.973	Turnbull (GBR); L 10.111; 71.521	Did not advance					

Keirin

Athlete	Event	Round 1	Repechage	Quarterfinals	Semifinals	Final
Athlete	Event	Rank	Rank	Rank	Rank	Rank
Vasilijus Lendel	Men's keirin	5 R	4	Did not advance		

Omnium

Athlete	Event	Scratch race		Tempo race		Elimination race		Points race		Total	
Athlete	Event	Rank	Points	Rank	Points	Rank	Points	Rank	Points	Rank	Points
Olivija Baleišytė	Women's omnium	7	28	14	14	13	16	7	22	11	80

== Equestrian ==
Lithuania entered two riders, one in dressage and one in eventing, through the final Olympic ranking for Group C (Central & Eastern Europe; Central Asia), marking the nation's Olympic debut in the sport.

=== Dressage ===
Athlete	Horse	Event	Grand Prix		Grand Prix Freestyle		Overall	
Athlete	Horse	Event	Score	Rank	Technical	Artistic	Score	Rank
Justina Vanagaitė	Nabab	Individual	69.208	6	Did not advance		69.208	38

Qualification Legend: Q = Qualified for the final based on position in group; q = Qualified for the final based on overall position

=== Jumping ===
Athlete	Horse	Event	Qualification		Final		
Athlete	Horse	Event	Penalties	Rank	Penalties	Time	Rank
Andrius Petrovas	Linkolns	Individual	Retired		Did not advance		

== Gymnastics ==
=== Artistic ===
Lithuania entered one gymnast into the Games. Robert Tvorogal secured his quota to compete at the Olympics by being one of the highest-ranked eligible athletes in the men's horizontal bar, based on the final accumulations of the 2024 Apparatus World Cup Series rankings.

Men

Athlete	Event	Qualification								Final							
Athlete	Event	Apparatus						Total	Rank	Apparatus						Total	Rank
Athlete	Event	F	PH	R	V	PB	HB	Total	Rank	F	PH	R	V	PB	HB	Total	Rank
Robert Tvorogal	All-around	—N/a				13.166	13.833	—N/a		Did not advance							

== Modern pentathlon ==
Lithuanian modern pentathletes secured two quota places for Paris 2024. Previous gold and silver medalist Laura Asadauskaitė earned her selection in the women's event by finishing fourth among those eligible for Olympic qualification at the 2023 European Games in Kraków, Poland. Meanwhile, Gintarė Venčkauskaitė qualified for the Games through the Olympic ranking.

Athlete	Event	Semifinal															Final														
Athlete	Event	Fencing (épée one touch)				Swimming (200 m freestyle)			Riding (show jumping)			Combined: shooting/running (10 m laser pistol)/(3000 m)			Total pts	Final rank	Fencing (épée one touch)				Swimming (200 m freestyle)			Riding (show jumping)			Combined: shooting/running (10 m laser pistol)/(3000 m)			Total pts	Final rank
Athlete	Event	RR	BR	Rank	MP pts	Time	Rank	MP pts	Penalties	Rank	MP pts	Time	Rank	MP pts	Total pts	Final rank	RR	BR	Rank	MP pts	Time	Rank	MP pts	Penalties	Rank	MP pts	Time	Rank	MP pts	Total pts	Final rank
Laura Asadauskaitė	Women's	16–19	0	14	205	2:23.71	15	263	9	10	291	11:10.90	1	630	1389	9 Q	16–19	2	14	207	2:24.52	17	261	7	13	293	11:32.07	13	608	1369	16
Gintarė Venčkauskaitė	Women's	16–19	0	10	205	2:19.15	11	272	0	1	300	11:25.30	4	615	1392	6 Q	16–19	0	16	205	2:18.16	12	274	0	2	300	11:00.31	4	640	1419	7

== Rowing ==
Lithuanian rowers qualified boats in each of the following classes through the 2023 World Rowing Championships in Belgrade, Serbia, and the 2024 Final Qualification Regatta in Lucerne, Switzerland.

Athlete	Event	Heats		Repechage		Quarterfinals		Semifinals		Final	
Athlete	Event	Time	Rank	Time	Rank	Time	Rank	Time	Rank	Time	Rank
Giedrius Bieliauskas	Men's single sculls	7:00.96	3 QF	Bye		6:51.80	2 SA/B	7:09.29	6 FB	6:56.39	10
Dovydas Stankūnas; Domantas Stankūnas	Men's coxless pair	6:44.59	3 SA/B	Bye		—N/a		6:43.60	5 FB	6:25.94	8
Viktorija Senkutė	Women's single sculls	7:30.01	1 QF	Bye		7:33.35	1 SA/B	7:19.15	2 FA	7:20.85	3rd place, bronze medalist(s)
Dovilė Rimkutė; Donata Karalienė	Women's double sculls	6:59.62	4 R	7:15.00	4	Did not advance					13
Ieva Adomavičiūtė; Kamilė Kralikaitė	Women's coxless pair	7:22.53	2 SA/B	Bye		—N/a		7:19.27	3 FA	7:05.34	5

Qualification Legend: FA=Final A (medal); FB=Final B (non-medal); FC=Final C (non-medal); FD=Final D (non-medal); FE=Final E (non-medal); FF=Final F (non-medal); SA/B=Semifinals A/B; SC/D=Semifinals C/D; SE/F=Semifinals E/F; QF=Quarterfinals; R=Repechage

== Sailing ==
Lithuanian sailors secured a quota place in the women's Laser Radial by being one of the top two eligible nations to qualify at the 2024 ILCA European Championships in Athens, Greece. They also secured a place in the men's IQFoil events through the 2024 Semaine Olympique Française (Last Chance Regatta) in Hyères, France.

Elimination events

Athlete	Event	Race																										Final rank
Athlete	Event	1	2	3	4	5	6	7	8	9	10	11	12	13	QF	SF1	SF2	SF3	SF4	SF5	SF6	F1	F2	F3	F4	F5	F6	Final rank
Rytis Jasiūnas	Men's IQFoil	16	19	20	12	21	12	4	14	2	20	17	12	17	Did not advance						Did not advance							17

Medal race events

Athlete	Event	Race																Net points	Final rank
Athlete	Event	1	2	3	4	5	6	7	8	9	10	11	12	13	14	15	M*	Net points	Final rank
Viktorija Andrulytė	Women's ILCA 6	~~40.2~~	5	36	26	32	33	31	27	6	—N/a						Did not advance	196	31

M = Medal race; EL = Eliminated – did not advance into the medal race

== Swimming ==
Lithuanian swimmers achieved entry standards in the following events for Paris 2024, with a maximum of two swimmers qualifying under the Olympic Qualifying Time (OST) and potentially additional swimmers under the Olympic Consideration Time (OCT):

Athlete	Event	Heat		Semifinal		Final	
Athlete	Event	Time	Rank	Time	Rank	Time	Rank
Danas Rapšys	Men's 100 m freestyle	48.53	20	Did not advance			
Danas Rapšys	Men's 200 m freestyle	1:45.91	2 Q	1:45.48	6 Q	1:45.46	5
Danas Rapšys	Men's 400 m freestyle	3:46.27	10	—N/a		Did not advance	
Andrius Šidlauskas	Men's 100 m breaststroke	1:00.29	20	Did not advance			
Aleksas Savickas	Men's 200 m breaststroke	2:11.53	19	Did not advance			
Danas Rapšys; Tomas Navikonis; Tomas Lukminas; Andrius Šidlauskas	Men's 4 × 200 m freestyle relay	7:16.61	15	—N/a		Did not advance	
Rūta Meilutytė	Women's 100 m breaststroke	1:06.34	10 Q	1:06.89	11	Did not advance	
Kotryna Teterevkova	Women's 100 m breaststroke	1:06.76	15 Q	1:07.48	16	Did not advance	
Kotryna Teterevkova	Women's 200 m breaststroke	2:24.59	10 Q	2:23.42	7 Q	2:23.75	5

== Volleyball ==
=== Beach ===
The Lithuanian women's pair qualified for Paris based on the FIVB Beach Volleyball Olympic Ranking.

Athletes	Event	Preliminary round				Round of 16	Quarterfinal	Semifinal	Final / BM	
Athletes	Event	Opposition Score	Opposition Score	Opposition Score	Rank	Opposition Score	Opposition Score	Opposition Score	Opposition Score	Rank
Monika Paulikienė; Ainė Raupelytė	Women's	Stam / Schoon (NED); L 19–21,17–21	Carol / Bárbara (BRA); L 13–21,14–21	Akiko / Ishii (JPN); L 11–21, 5–21	4	Did not advance				19

== Wrestling ==
Key:

- VT (ranking points: 5–0 or 0–5) – Victory by fall.
- VB (ranking points: 5–0 or 0–5) – Victory by injury (VF for forfeit, VA for withdrawal or disqualification)
- PP (ranking points: 3–1 or 1–3) – Decision by points – the loser with technical points.
- PO (ranking points: 3–0 or 0–3) – Decision by points – the loser without technical points.
- ST (ranking points: 4–0 or 0–4) – Great superiority – the loser without technical points and a margin of victory of at least 8 (Greco-Roman) or 10 (freestyle) points.
- SP (ranking points: 4–1 or 1–4) – Technical superiority – the loser with technical points and a margin of victory of at least 8 (Greco-Roman) or 10 (freestyle) points.

Freestyle

Athlete	Event	Round of 16	Quarterfinal	Semifinal	Repechage	Final / BM	
Athlete	Event	Opposition Result	Opposition Result	Opposition Result	Opposition Result	Opposition Result	Rank
Gabija Dilytė	Women's 50 kg	Cardozo (COL); W 6–0^{F}	Guzmán (CUB); L 0–10	Did not advance			

Greco-Roman

Athlete	Event	Round of 16	Quarterfinal	Semifinal	Repechage	Final / BM	
Athlete	Event	Opposition Result	Opposition Result	Opposition Result	Opposition Result	Opposition Result	Rank
Mindaugas Venckaitis	97 kg	Dzhuzupbekov (KGZ); L 1–5	Did not advance				
Mantas Knystautas	130 kg	Assad (MAR); W 9–0	Lingzhe (CHN); L 1–1	Did not advance			
