= Morocco at the 2024 Summer Olympics =

- IOC code: MAR
- NOC: Moroccan Olympic Committee
- Website: www.cnom.org.ma (in French)

in Paris, France 26 July 2024 – 11 August 2024
- Competitors: 60 (42 men and 18 women) in 19 sports
- Flag bearers (opening): Yessin Rahmouni & Ines Laklalech
- Flag bearers (closing): Bilal Mallakh & Oumaima El-Bouchti
- Medals Ranked 60th: Gold 1 Silver 0 Bronze 1 Total 2

Summer Olympics appearances (overview)
- 1960; 1964; 1968; 1972; 1976; 1980; 1984; 1988; 1992; 1996; 2000; 2004; 2008; 2012; 2016; 2020; 2024; 2028

Morocco competed at the 2024 Summer Olympics in Paris from 26 July to 11 August 2024. It was the nation's sixteenth appearance at the Summer Olympics, except Moscow 1980, as part of the United States-led boycott.

== Medalists ==
| Medal | Name | Sport | Event | Date |
|---|---|---|---|---|
| Gold | Soufiane El Bakkali | Athletics | Men's 3000 m steeplechase | 7 August |
| Bronze | Morocco national under-23 football team: Ilias Akhomach; Eliesse Ben Seghir; Benjamin Bouchouari; Mehdi Boukamir; Oussama El Azzouzi; Bilal El Khannous; Zakaria El Ouahdi; Abde Ezzalzouli; Rachid Ghanimi; Achraf Hakimi; Yassine Kechta; Haytam Manaout; El Mehdi Maouhoub; Munir Mohamedi; Akram Nakach; Soufiane Rahimi; Amir Richardson; Adil Tahif; Oussama Targhalline | Football | Men's tournament | 8 August |

== Competitors ==
The following is the list of number of competitors in the Games. Note that reserves in football are not counted:

| Sport | Men | Women | Total |
|---|---|---|---|
| Athletics | 8 | 5 | 13 |
| Boxing | 0 | 3 | 3 |
| Breaking | 1 | 1 | 2 |
| Canoeing | 2 | 0 | 2 |
| Cycling | 2 | 0 | 2 |
| Equestrian | 1 | 1 | 2 |
| Fencing | 1 | 1 | 2 |
| Football | 18 | 0 | 18 |
| Golf | 0 | 1 | 1 |
| Judo | 2 | 1 | 3 |
| Rowing | 0 | 1 | 1 |
| Shooting | 1 | 0 | 1 |
| Skateboarding | 0 | 1 | 1 |
| Surfing | 1 | 0 | 1 |
| Swimming | 1 | 1 | 2 |
| Taekwondo | 0 | 2 | 2 |
| Triathlon | 1 | 0 | 1 |
| Volleyball | 2 | 0 | 2 |
| Wrestling | 1 | 0 | 1 |
| Total | 42 | 18 | 60 |

== Athletics ==
Moroccan track and field athletes achieved the entry standards for Paris 2024, either by passing the direct qualifying mark (or time for track and road races) or by world ranking, in the following events (a maximum of 3 athletes each):

Key

- Note–Ranks given for track events are within the athlete's heat only
- Q = Qualified for the next round
- q = Qualified for the next round as a fastest loser or, in field events, by position without achieving the qualifying target
- NR = National record
- N/A = Round not applicable for the event
- Bye = Athlete not required to compete in round

Track and road events
Men

| Athlete | Event | Heat | | Repechage | | Semifinal | | Final | |
| Athlete | Event | Result | Rank | Result | Rank | Result | Rank | Result | Rank |
|---|---|---|---|---|---|---|---|---|---|
| Abdelati El Guesse | 800 m | 1:46.91 | 5 R | DNS | | Did not advance | | | |
| Anass Essayi | 1500 m | 3:36.44 | 4 Q | Bye | | 3:32.49 | 7 | Did not advance | |
| Mohamed Tindouft | 3000 m steeplechase | 8:10.62 | 1 Q | —N/a | | | | 8:14.82 | 12 |
| Soufiane El Bakkali | 3000 m steeplechase | 8:17.90 | 1 Q | —N/a | | | | 8:06.05 | 1st place, gold medalist(s) |
| Faid El Mostafa | 3000 m steeplechase | 8:39.48 | 12 | —N/a | | | | Did not advance | |
| Othmane El Goumri | Marathon | —N/a | | | | | | 2:10:06 | 18 |
| Zouhair Talbi | Marathon | —N/a | | | | | | 2:11:51 | 35 |
| Mouhcine Outalha | Marathon | —N/a | | | | | | DNF | |

Women

| Athlete | Event | Heat | | Repechage | | Semifinal | | Final | |
| Athlete | Event | Result | Rank | Result | Rank | Result | Rank | Result | Rank |
|---|---|---|---|---|---|---|---|---|---|
| Noura Ennadi | 400 m hurdles | 55.26 | 2 Q | Bye | | 55.50 | 8 | Did not advance | |
| Assia Raziki | 800 m | DSQ | | Did not advance | | | | | |
| Kaoutar Farkoussi | Marathon | —N/a | | | | | | 2:31:34 | 39 |
| Fatima Ezzahra Gardadi | Marathon | —N/a | | | | | | 2:26:30 | 11 |
| Rahma Tahiri | Marathon | —N/a | | | | | | DNF | |

== Boxing ==
Morocco entered three boxers into the Olympic tournament. Yasmine Moutaqui (women's flyweight) and Widad Bertal (women's bantamweight) secured a spot in their respective division by advancing to the final match, while Khadija El-Mardi qualified for the games in the women's middleweight division through the 2023 African Olympic Qualification Tournament in Dakar, Senegal.

| Athlete | Event | Round of 32 | Round of 16 | Quarterfinals | Semifinals | Final | |
| Athlete | Event | Opposition Result | Opposition Result | Opposition Result | Opposition Result | Opposition Result | Rank |
|---|---|---|---|---|---|---|---|
| Yasmine Moutaqui | Women's 50 kg | Villegas (PHI); L 0–5 | Did not advance | | | | |
| Widad Bertal | Women's 54 kg | Bye | Jitpong (THA); W 3–2 | Pang (PRK); L 0–4 | Did not advance | | |
| Khadija El-Mardi | Women's 75 kg | —N/a | Reid (GBR); W 3–2 | Parker (AUS); L 1–4 | Did not advance | | |

== Breaking ==
Morocco entered two breakdancers to compete in their respective gender-based dual battles for Paris 2024. Bilal Mallakh (Billy) and Fatima El-Mamouny (Elmamouny) secured the spots on the Moroccan squad with a gold-medal victory each in the B-boys and B-girls final battle at the 2023 WDSF African Breaking Championships in Rabat.

| Athlete | Nickname | Event | Qualification | | Round of 16 | Quarterfinal | Semifinal | Final / BM | |
| Athlete | Nickname | Event | Points | Rank | Opposition Result | Opposition Result | Opposition Result | Opposition Result | Rank |
|---|---|---|---|---|---|---|---|---|---|
| Bilal Mallakh | Billy | B-Boys | 4 | 15 | Did not advance | | | | |
| Fatima El-Mamouny | Elmamouny | B-Girls | 2 | 15 | Did not advance | | | | |

== Canoeing ==
=== Slalom ===
Morocco entered a single boat into the slalom competition for the Games through the 2023 ICF Canoe Slalom World Championships in London, Great Britain.

| Athlete | Event | Preliminary | | | | | | Semifinal | | Final | |
| Athlete | Event | Run 1 | Rank | Run 2 | Rank | Best | Rank | Time | Rank | Time | Rank |
|---|---|---|---|---|---|---|---|---|---|---|---|
| Mathis Soudi | Men's K-1 | 89.90 | 14 | 89.45 | 9 | 89.45 | 16 Q | 104.11 | 16 | Did not advance | |

Kayak cross

| Athlete | Event | Time trial | | Round 1 | Repechage | Heat | Quarterfinal | Semifinal | Final | |
| Athlete | Event | Time | Rank | Position | Position | Position | Position | Position | Position | Rank |
|---|---|---|---|---|---|---|---|---|---|---|
| Mathis Soudi | Men's KX-1 | 70.53 | 17 | 3 R | 3 | Did not advance | | | | 33 |

=== Sprint ===
Moroccan male canoeists qualified one boat for the Games through the highest-ranked eligible nation's result in the K-1 1000 metres event at the 2023 Canoe Sprint African Championships in Abuja, Nigeria.

| Athlete | Event | Heats | | Quarterfinals | | Semifinals | | Final | |
| Athlete | Event | Time | Rank | Time | Rank | Time | Rank | Time | Rank |
|---|---|---|---|---|---|---|---|---|---|
| Achraf El Aydi | Men's K-1 1000 m | 3:50.36 | 5 q | 4:02.27 | 6 | Did not advance | | | |

Qualification Legend: FA = Qualify to final (medal); FB = Qualify to final B (non-medal)

== Cycling ==
=== Road ===
Morocco entered one male rider to compete in the men's road race events at the Olympics. Morocco secured this quota through the UCI Nation Ranking.

| Athlete | Event | Time | Rank |
|---|---|---|---|
| Achraf Ed Doghmy | Men's road race | DNF | DNF |

=== BMX ===
Morocco entered one male rider to compete in the men's race events at the Olympics through the 2023 African Championships in Harare, Zimbabwe.

Race

| Athlete | Event | Quarterfinal | | Semifinal | | Final | |
| Athlete | Event | Points | Rank | Points | Rank | Result | Rank |
|---|---|---|---|---|---|---|---|
| Dean Reeves | Men's race | 20 | 22 | Did not advance | | | |

== Equestrian ==
Morocco entered two riders, each in the dressage and eventing events, through the establishment of the final Olympic ranking for Group F (Africa & Middle East).

=== Dressage ===
| Athlete | Horse | Event | Grand Prix | | Grand Prix Freestyle | | Overall | |
| Athlete | Horse | Event | Score | Rank | Technical | Artistic | Score | Rank |
|---|---|---|---|---|---|---|---|---|
| Yessin Rahmouni | All At Once | Individual | 68.696 | 42 | Did not advance | | | |

Qualification Legend: Q = Qualified for the final based on position in group; q = Qualified for the final based on overall position

=== Eventing ===
| Athlete | Horse | Event | Dressage | | Cross-country | | | Jumping | | | | | | Total | |
| Athlete | Horse | Event | Dressage | | Cross-country | | | Qualifier | | | Final | | | Total | |
| Athlete | Horse | Event | Penalties | Rank | Penalties | Total | Rank | Penalties | Total | Rank | Penalties | Total | Rank | Penalties | Rank |
|---|---|---|---|---|---|---|---|---|---|---|---|---|---|---|---|
| Noor Slaoui | Cash in Hand | Individual | 36.4 | 48 | 24.0 | 60.4 | 43 | 20.8 | 81.2 | 45 | Did not advance | | | | |

== Fencing ==
Morocco entered two fencers into the Olympic competition. Houssam El Kord secured a quota place in the men's épée events, after being nominated as one of the two highest-ranked individuals eligible for the African zone through the release of the FIE Official ranking for Paris 2024; meanwhile, Youssra Zekrani qualified for the games by winning the gold medal in the women's individual foil events, at the 2024 African Zonal Qualifying Tournament in Algiers, Algeria.

| Athlete | Event | Round of 64 | Round of 32 | Round of 16 | Quarterfinal | Semifinal | Final / BM | |
| Athlete | Event | Opposition Score | Opposition Score | Opposition Score | Opposition Score | Opposition Score | Opposition Score | Rank |
|---|---|---|---|---|---|---|---|---|
| Houssam El Kord | Men's épée | Bye | Kurbanov (KAZ); L 13–15 | Did not advance | | | | |
| Youssra Zekrani | Women's foil | Jelińska (POL); L 3–15 | Did not advance | | | | | |

== Football ==
Summary

Key:

- A.E.T – After extra time.
- P – Match decided by penalty-shootout.

| Team | Event | Group Stage | | | | Quarterfinal | Semifinal | Final / BM | |
| Team | Event | Opposition Score | Opposition Score | Opposition Score | Rank | Opposition Score | Opposition Score | Opposition Score | Rank |
|---|---|---|---|---|---|---|---|---|---|
| Morocco men's | Men's tournament | Argentina; W 2–1 | Ukraine; L 1–2 | Iraq; W 3–0 | 1 Q | United States; W 4–0 | Spain; L 1–2 | Egypt; W 6–0 | 3rd place, bronze medalist(s) |

=== Men's tournament ===
Morocco men's football team qualified for the Olympics by advancing to the final match of the 2023 U-23 Africa Cup of Nations in Rabat, marking the country's return to the sport after twelve years.

Team roster

Morocco announced their initial 22-men squad on 4 July 2024. Ayman El Wafi withdrew on 9 July 2024 after his club refused to release him, and was replaced by Bilal El Ouadghiri.

Head coach: Tarik Sektioui

| No. | Pos. | Player | Date of birth (age) | Caps | Goals | Club |
|---|---|---|---|---|---|---|
| 1 | GK | Munir El Kajoui* | 10 May 1989 (aged 35) | 0 | 0 | (Saudi Arabian Football Federation) Al-Wehda |
| 2 | DF | Achraf Hakimi* (captain) | 4 November 1998 (aged 25) | 2 | 0 | (French Football Federation) Paris Saint-Germain |
| 3 | DF | Akram Nakach | 7 April 2002 (aged 22) | 1 | 0 | (Royal Moroccan Football Federation) Union de Touarga |
| 4 | DF | Mehdi Boukamir | 26 January 2004 (aged 20) | 8 | 0 | (Royal Belgian Football Association) Charleroi |
| 5 | DF | Adil Tahif | 24 February 2001 (aged 23) | 5 | 0 | (Royal Moroccan Football Federation) RS Berkane |
| 6 | MF | Benjamin Bouchouari | 13 November 2001 (aged 22) | 10 | 0 | (French Football Federation) Saint-Étienne |
| 7 | FW | Eliesse Ben Seghir | 16 February 2005 (aged 19) | 0 | 0 | (French Football Federation) Monaco |
| 8 | MF | Bilal El Khannous | 10 May 2004 (aged 20) | 2 | 0 | (Royal Belgian Football Association) Genk |
| 9 | FW | Soufiane Rahimi* | 2 June 1996 (aged 28) | 5 | 5 | (United Arab Emirates Football Association) Al-Ain |
| 10 | FW | Ilias Akhomach | 16 April 2004 (aged 20) | 1 | 0 | (Royal Spanish Football Federation) Villarreal |
| 11 | DF | Zakaria El Ouahdi | 31 December 2001 (aged 22) | 13 | 3 | (Royal Belgian Football Association) Genk |
| 12 | GK | Rachid Ghanimi | 25 April 2001 (aged 23) | 1 | 0 | (Royal Moroccan Football Federation) FUS Rabat |
| 13 | MF | Yassine Kechta | 25 February 2002 (aged 22) | 7 | 1 | (French Football Federation) Le Havre |
| 14 | MF | Oussama Targhalline | 20 May 2002 (aged 22) | 10 | 1 | (French Football Federation) Le Havre |
| 15 | FW | El Mehdi Maouhoub | 5 June 2003 (aged 21) | 2 | 1 | (Royal Moroccan Football Federation) Raja Casablanca |
| 16 | FW | Abde Ezzalzouli | 25 December 2001 (aged 22) | 5 | 3 | (Royal Spanish Football Federation) Real Betis |
| 17 | MF | Oussama El Azzouzi | 29 May 2001 (aged 23) | 7 | 0 | (Italian Football Federation) Bologna |
| 18 | MF | Amir Richardson | 24 January 2002 (aged 22) | 8 | 1 | (French Football Federation) Reims |
| 19 | DF | Haytam Manaout | 18 April 2001 (aged 23) | 3 | 0 | (Royal Moroccan Football Federation) Union de Touarga |

* Overage player.

Group play

| Pos | Team | Pld | W | D | L | GF | GA | GD | Pts | Qualification |
|---|---|---|---|---|---|---|---|---|---|---|
| 1 | Morocco | 3 | 2 | 0 | 1 | 6 | 3 | +3 | 6 (Note: Head-to-head points: Morocco 3, Argentina 0.) | Advance to knockout stage |
| 2 | Argentina | 3 | 2 | 0 | 1 | 6 | 3 | +3 | 6 | Advance to knockout stage |
| 3 | Ukraine | 3 | 1 | 0 | 2 | 3 | 5 | −2 | 3 | |
| 4 | Iraq | 3 | 1 | 0 | 2 | 3 | 7 | −4 | 3 | |

Source: FIFA
Rules for classification: Group stage tiebreakers
Notes:
24 July 2024
15:00

| Argentina | 1–2 | Morocco |
|---|---|---|
| Simeone 68' | Report | Rahimi 45+2', 51' (pen.) |

Stade Geoffroy-Guichard, Saint-Étienne
Attendance: 26,717
Referee: Glenn Nyberg (Sweden)

27 July 2024
17:00

| Ukraine | 2–1 | Morocco |
|---|---|---|
| Kryskiv 22'; Krasnopir 90+8' | Report | Rahimi 64' (pen.) |

Stade Geoffroy-Guichard, Saint-Étienne
Attendance: 28,655
Referee: Saíd Martínez (Honduras)

30 July 2024
17:00

| Morocco | 3–0 | Iraq |
|---|---|---|
| Richardson 19'; Rahimi 28'; Ezzalzouli 36' | Report |

Stade de Nice, Nice
Attendance: 19,300
Referee: Ramon Abatti (Brazil)

Quarterfinal

2 August 2024
15:00

| Morocco | 4–0 | United States |
|---|---|---|
| Rahimi 29' (pen.); Akhomach 63'; Hakimi 70'; Maouhoub 90+1' (pen.) | Report |

Parc des Princes, Paris
Attendance: 42,868
Referee: Yael Falcón (Argentina)

Semifinal

5 August 2024
18:00

| Morocco | 1–2 | Spain |
|---|---|---|
| Rahimi 37' (pen.) | Report | López 65'; Juanlu 86' |

Stade de Marseille, Marseille
Attendance: 59,882
Referee: Ilgiz Tantashev (Uzbekistan) (substituted off) 17'
Glenn Nyberg (Sweden) (substituted on) 17'

Bronze medal match

8 August 2024
17:00

| Egypt | 0–6 | Morocco |
|---|---|---|
| | Report | Ezzalzouli 23'; Rahimi 26', 64'; El Khannouss 51'; Nakach 73'; Hakimi 87' |

Stade de la Beaujoire, Nantes
Attendance: 27,391
Referee: Espen Eskås (Norway)

== Golf ==
Morocco entered one female golfer into the Olympic tournament. Ines Laklalech qualified directly for the games in the women's individual competitions, based on her world ranking positions, on the IGF World Rankings.

| Athlete | Event | Round 1 | Round 2 | Round 3 | Round 4 | Total | | |
| Athlete | Event | Score | Score | Score | Score | Score | Par | Rank |
|---|---|---|---|---|---|---|---|---|
| Ines Laklalech | Women's | 78 | 75 | 77 | 73 | 303 | +15 | 52 |

== Judo ==
Morocco qualified three judokas for the following weight classes at the Games. Abderrahmane Boushita (men's half-lightweight, 66 kg) and Soumiya Iraoui (women's half-lightweight, 52 kg) got qualified via quota based on IJF World Ranking List and continental quota based on Olympic point rankings.

| Athlete | Event | Round of 64 | Round of 32 | Round of 16 | Quarterfinals | Semifinals | Repechage | Final / BM | |
| Athlete | Event | Opposition Result | Opposition Result | Opposition Result | Opposition Result | Opposition Result | Opposition Result | Opposition Result | Rank |
|---|---|---|---|---|---|---|---|---|---|
| Abderrahmane Boushita | Men's −66 kg | —N/a | Shmailov (ISR); L 00–01 | Did not advance | | | | | |
| Achraf Moutii | Men's −81 kg | Bye | Lee (KOR); L 00–01 | Did not advance | | | | | |
| Soumiya Iraoui | Women's −52 kg | —N/a | Asvesta (CYP); L 00–01 | Did not advance | | | | | |

== Rowing ==
Moroccan rowers qualified one boats in the women's single sculls for the Games through the 2023 African Qualification Regatta in Tunis, Tunisia.

| Athlete | Event | Heats | | Repechage | | Quarterfinals | | Semifinals | | Final | |
| Athlete | Event | Time | Rank | Time | Rank | Time | Rank | Time | Rank | Time | Rank |
|---|---|---|---|---|---|---|---|---|---|---|---|
| Majdouline El Allaoui | Women's single sculls | 8:30.47 | 6 R | 8:42.07 | 5 SE/F | —N/a | | 8:49.70 | 4 FF | 8:20.81 | 31 |

Qualification Legend: FA=Final A (medal); FB=Final B (non-medal); FC=Final C (non-medal); FD=Final D (non-medal); FE=Final E (non-medal); FF=Final F (non-medal); SA/B=Semifinals A/B; SC/D=Semifinals C/D; SE/F=Semifinals E/F; QF=Quarterfinals; R=Repechage

== Shooting ==
Moroccan shooters achieved quota places for the following events based on their results at the 2022 and 2023 ISSF World Championships, 2023 African Championships, and 2024 ISSF World Olympic Qualification Tournament.

| Athlete | Event | Qualification | | Semifinal | | Final | |
| Athlete | Event | Points | Rank | Points | Rank | Points | Rank |
|---|---|---|---|---|---|---|---|
| Driss Haffari | Men's trap | 122 | 10 | Did not advance | | | |

== Skateboarding ==
Morocco entered one skateboarder into the Olympic tournament. Aya Asaqas qualified to compete in the women's park event after being ranked in the top 20 within the Olympic World Skateboarding ranking.

| Athlete | Event | Qualification | | Final | |
| Athlete | Event | Result | Rank | Result | Rank |
|---|---|---|---|---|---|
| Aya Asaqas | Women's park | 13.68 | 22 | Did not advance | |

== Surfing ==
Moroccan surfers confirmed one shortboard quota place for Tahiti 2024. Tokyo 2020 Olympian Ramzi Boukhiam, qualified for the games, by virtue of the results of top six individual men's surfer, not yet qualified, at the 2024 ISA World Surfing Games in Arecibo, Puerto Rico.

| Athlete | Event | Round 1 | | Round 2 | Round 3 | Quarterfinal | Semifinal | Final / BM | |
| Athlete | Event | Score | Rank | Opposition Result | Opposition Result | Opposition Result | Opposition Result | Opposition Result | Rank |
|---|---|---|---|---|---|---|---|---|---|
| Ramzi Boukhiam | Men's shortboard | 9.76 | 2 R2 | Pérez (ESA); W 14.60–12.60 | Chianca (BRA); L 17.80–18.10 | Did not advance | | | |

== Swimming ==
Morocco sent two swimmers to compete at the 2024 Paris Olympics.

| Athlete | Event | Heat | | Semifinal | | Final | |
| Athlete | Event | Time | Rank | Time | Rank | Time | Rank |
|---|---|---|---|---|---|---|---|
| Ilias El Fallaki | Men's 400 m freestyle | 4:01.59 | 33 | Did not advance | | | |
| Imane El Barodi | Women's 100 m breaststroke | 1:14.57 | 34 | Did not advance | | | |

== Taekwondo ==
Morocco qualified two athletes to compete at the games. Fatima-Ezzahra Aboufaras qualified for Paris 2024 following the triumph of her victory in the semifinal round, at the 2024 African Qualification Tournament in Dakar, Senegal. Later on, Oumaima El-Bouchti join the Moroccan squads after receiving the re-allocations of unused Oceanian Olympic quotas.

| Athlete | Event | Qualification | Round of 16 | Quarterfinals | Semifinals | Repechage | Final / BM | |
| Athlete | Event | Opposition Result | Opposition Result | Opposition Result | Opposition Result | Opposition Result | Opposition Result | Rank |
|---|---|---|---|---|---|---|---|---|
| Oumaima El-Bouchti | Women's −49 kg | da Costa da Silva (TLS); W 2–1, 4–1 | Wongpattanakit (THA); L 1–8, 1–10 | —N/a | | Abutaleb (KSA); L 0–2, 0–7 | Did not advance | |
| Fatima-Ezzahra Aboufaras | Women's +67 kg | —N/a | Abo-Alrub (JOR); L 3–0, 6–1, 3–3 | Did not advance | | | | |

== Triathlon ==
Morocco entered one triathlete in the triathlon events for Paris, following the release of final individual Olympics qualification ranking.

Individual

| Athlete | Event | Time | | | | | | Rank |
| Athlete | Event | Swim (1.5 km) | Trans 1 | Bike (40 km) | Trans 2 | Run (10 km) | Total | Rank |
|---|---|---|---|---|---|---|---|---|
| Jawad Abdelmoula | Men's | 22:29 | 0:52 | Lapped | | | | |

== Volleyball ==
=== Beach ===
Morocco men's pair qualified for Paris after winning the 2024 CAVB Continental Cup Final in Martil.

| Athletes | Event | Preliminary round | | | | Round of 16 | Quarterfinal | Semifinal | Final / BM | |
| Athletes | Event | Opposition Score | Opposition Score | Opposition Score | Rank | Opposition Score | Opposition Score | Opposition Score | Opposition Score | Rank |
|---|---|---|---|---|---|---|---|---|---|---|
| Mohamed Abicha; Zouheir El Graoui | Men's | George / André (BRA); L (18–21, 10–21) | Partain / Benesh (USA); L (12–21, 26–28) | Díaz / Alayo (CUB); L (14–21, 11–21) | 4 | Did not advance | | | | 19 |

== Wrestling ==
Morocco qualified one wrestler for Paris 2024. Oussama Assad qualified for the games following the triumph of advancing to the final round at 2024 African & Oceania Olympic Qualification Tournament in Alexandria, Egypt.

Key:

- VT (ranking points: 5–0 or 0–5) – Victory by fall.
- VB (ranking points: 5–0 or 0–5) – Victory by injury (VF for forfeit, VA for withdrawal or disqualification)
- PP (ranking points: 3–1 or 1–3) – Decision by points – the loser with technical points.
- PO (ranking points: 3–0 or 0–3) – Decision by points – the loser without technical points.
- ST (ranking points: 4–0 or 0–4) – Great superiority – the loser without technical points and a margin of victory of at least 8 (Greco-Roman) or 10 (freestyle) points.
- SP (ranking points: 4–1 or 1–4) – Technical superiority – the loser with technical points and a margin of victory of at least 8 (Greco-Roman) or 10 (freestyle) points.

Greco-Roman

| Athlete | Event | Round of 16 | Quarterfinals | Semifinals | Repechage | Final / BM | |
| Athlete | Event | Opposition Result | Opposition Result | Opposition Result | Opposition Result | Opposition Result | Rank |
|---|---|---|---|---|---|---|---|
| Oussama Assad | Men's −130 kg | Knystautas (LTU); L 9–0 | Did not advance | | | | |
