= Jeff Dunne =

Jeff Dunne may refer to:

- Jeff Dunne (footballer)
- Jeff Dunne (breakdancer)

== See also ==
- Jeffrey Dunn, British guitarist
