= Wug =

Wug or WUG may refer to:

- Wake Up, Girls!, a Japanese mixed-media project, consists of idol group/seiyuu unit and anime series
- Wireless user group, a wireless network run by enthusiasts
- Wirtschaft und Gesellschaft, the original title of Max Weber's magnum opus Economy and Society
- Universiade (translated as World University Games), an international athletic event for university students
- World Urban Games, a multi-sport event organized by SportAccord
- The Wug Test, a psycholinguistic experiment that depicted an imaginary creature, known as a wug
- Wyższy Urząd Górniczy, the State Mining Authority in Poland
