= 2023 WDSF Oceania Breaking Championship =

Breakdancing competition

- Location: Sydney, Australia
- Dates: 27–28 October
- Competitors: 52 from 4 nations

The 2023 WDSF Oceania Breaking Championship was held in Sydney, Australia from October 27th to October 28th, 2023.

The gold medalist in each category qualified for the Breaking competition at the 2024 Summer Olympics. Jeff Dunne (J Attack) won the B-Boys event, and Rachael Gunn (Raygun) won the B-Girls event.

== B-Boys ==
37 B-boys from 4 nations took part in preselection. The top sixteen scorers advanced to four round robin groups, and the top two in each group advanced to the knockout round.

=== Preselection ===
Rank	Name	Nickname	Country	Score
1	Peter Sette	Sette	Australia	71.9
2	Jeff Dunne	J Attack	Australia	71.8
3	Gerard Cabellon	Kid Tek	Australia	70.6
4	Ba Duc Hoang	Mighty Duck	Australia	70.5
5	Jericho Lim	Jericho	Australia	70.3
6	Harry Phan	Harry	Australia	70.1
7	Aron Mahuika	Akorn	New Zealand	69
8	Benji Cogdell-Baird	Benmx	Australia	68.8
9	Lawrence Bernal	The Law	Australia	67.9
10	Paulo Adorable	Pau	Australia	65.9
11	Christopher Cielo	Cielo	Australia	65.3
12	Alejandro Scarone	Alejandro	Australia	64.9
13	Taimatariki Mihaere	Tydal	Australia	63.6
14	Jared Graham	Leerok	New Zealand	62.8
15	Tyron De La Cruz	Thunda	Australia	62.6
16	Jed Granger	Jedi	Australia	62.3
17	Peter Kal	FLYForty	Papua New Guinea	61.6
18	Garrett Griffiths	Gaz	Australia	61.6
19	Matthew Tsang	Confusion	Australia	61.4
20	Isaac Gangemi	Izza	Australia	60.3
21	Jackson Garcia	Jackson	Australia	59.2
22	Jared Boyle	Bones	New Zealand	59.1
23	Johnson Xu	Johnson	Australia	58
24	Seth Ibbotson	Seth	New Zealand	57.2
25	Jacob Goodridge	Monsta	Australia	57.1
26	Brian Hong	Boo G	Australia	56.4
27	Heiron Chan	Heiron Ting-Hei	Australia	55.7
28	Jafri Yakin	Jaffaz	Australia	54.4
29	Naethiel Lumbera	Tango	Australia	54.4
30	Keith Enriquez	Lean	Australia	54.2
31	Jai Clarke	Jai	Australia	53.2
32	Dylan Hester	D-Struction	Australia	52.9
33	Mark Yum	Markie Mark	New Zealand	51.8
34	Cody Chockman	Code-E	Australia	51.4
35	Michael Fox	Michael	Australia	50.1
36	Atunaisa Laqeretabua	Atu	Fiji	44.1
37	David Arbis	Arbis	Australia	39

=== Round robin ===
==== Group A ====
Rank	Breaker	Nation	Rounds	Votes	Notes
1	Benmx	Australia	6	39	Q
2	Sette	Australia	3	28	Q
3	The Law	Australia	3	26	
4	Jedi	Australia	0	15	

==== Group B ====
Rank	Breaker	Nation	Rounds	Votes	Notes
1	J Attack	Australia	6	41	Q
2	Akorn	New Zealand	4	42	Q
3	Pau	Australia	1	14	
4	Thunda	Australia	1	11	

==== Group C ====
Rank	Breaker	Nation	Rounds	Votes	Notes
1	Kid Tek	Australia	6	48	Q
2	Cielo	Australia	4	36	Q
3	Harry	Australia	1	16	
4	Leerok	New Zealand	1	8	

==== Group D ====
Rank	Breaker	Nation	Rounds	Votes	Notes
1	Mighty Duck	Australia	5	42	Q
2	Tydal	Australia	4	34	Q
3	Alejandro	Australia	3	26	
4	Jericho	Australia	0	6	

=== Knockout round ===
Quarterfinals
(Australia) Kid Tek	8	9
(New Zealand) Akorn	1	0
(Australia) Benmx	7	4	8
(Australia) Tydal	2	5	1
(Australia) Cielo	1	4
(Australia) J Attack	8	5
(Australia) Mighty Duck	6	9
(Australia) Sette	3	0

Semifinals
(Australia) Benmx	2	7	6
(Australia) Kid Tek	7	2	3
(Australia) Mighty Duck	1	2	3
(Australia) J Attack	8	7	6

Gold medal battle
(Australia) Benmx (silver)	2	0	0
(Australia) J Attack (gold)	7	9	9
Bronze medal battle
(Australia) Mighty Duck	3	2	1
(Australia) Kid Tek (bronze)	6	7	8

== B-Girls ==
15 B-girls from 2 nations took part in preselection. The top eight scorers advanced to the knockout round.

=== Preselection ===
Rank	Name	Nickname	Country	Score
1	Rachael Gunn	Raygun	Australia	65.8
2	Geraldina Hnitko	G-Clef	Australia	62.6
3	Hannah Belet	Hannah	Australia	62.3
4	Molly Chapman	Holy Molly	Australia	61.9
5	Fauntine Lariba	Fontz	Australia	60.2
6	Leah Clark	Flix	Australia	60
7	Shannon Campradt	Sparklez	Australia	58.3
8	Isabelle Lee	Fizzy	Australia	58.1
9	Shang-Ting Wu	Tnt	New Zealand	56.8
10	Olivia Hadley	O	Australia	52.1
11	Hayley Ng	H	New Zealand	49.8
12	Jessica Liu	Jess	Australia	47
13	Peggy Liu	Pegz	Australia	45.9
14	Rosa Monsour	Rosa	Australia	45.3
15	Lydia Mattu	Lidls	Australia	40.6

=== Knockout round ===
Quarterfinals
(Australia) Raygun	9	9
(Australia) Fizzy	0	0
(Australia) Hannah	6	9
(Australia) Flix	3	0
(Australia) Fontz	1	2
(Australia) Holy Molly	8	7
(Australia) G-Clef	6	6
(Australia) Sparklez	3	3

Semifinals
(Australia) Raygun	8	6	4
(Australia) Hannah	1	3	5
(Australia) Holy Molly	5	9	9
(Australia) G-Clef	4	0	0

Gold medal battle
(Australia) Holy Molly (silver)	2	7	3
(Australia) Raygun (gold)	7	2	6
Bronze medal battle
(Australia) G-Clef	2	0	3
(Australia) Hannah (bronze)	7	9	6
