= Dominika Banevič =

Lithuanian breakdancer

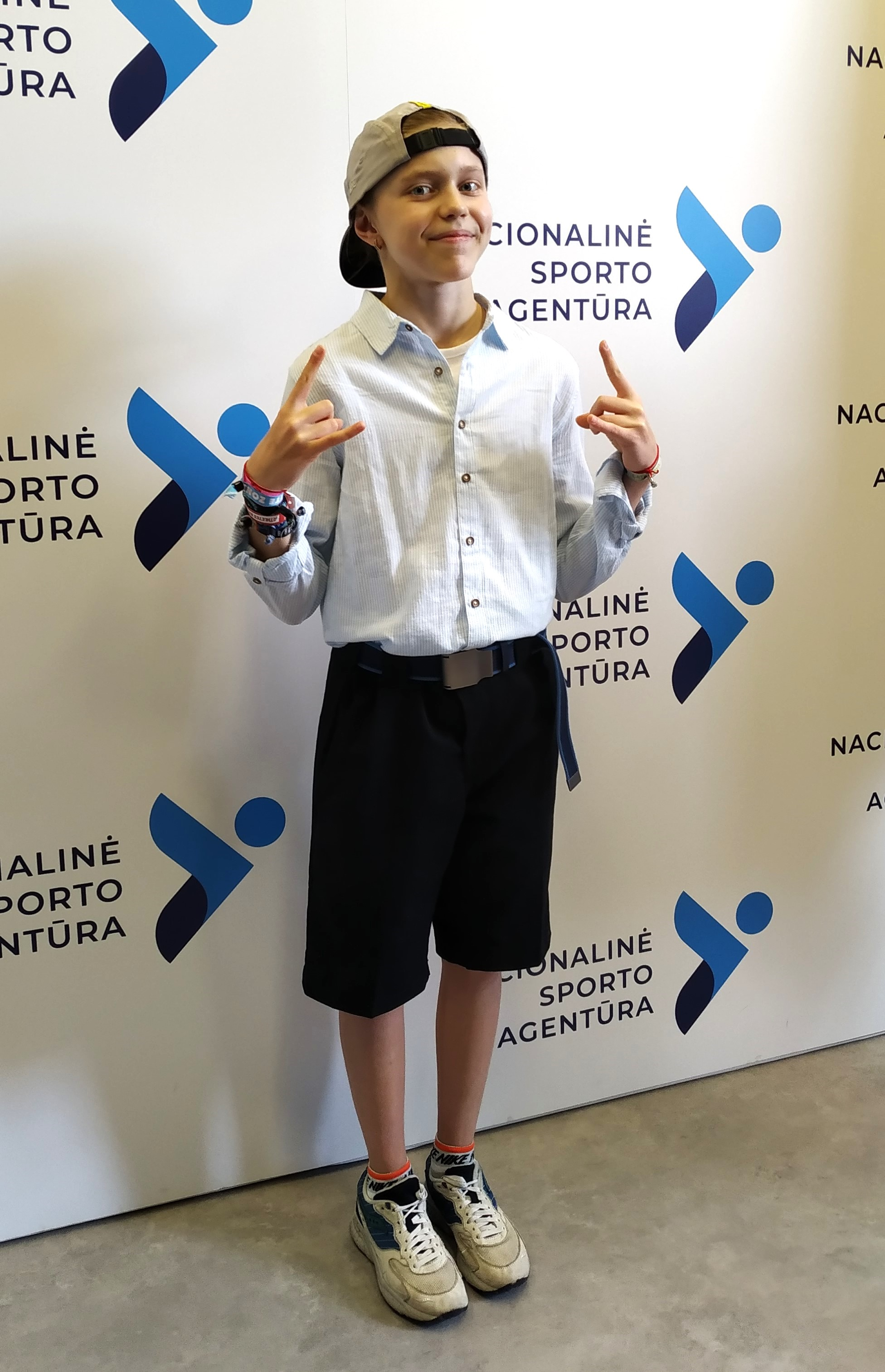
- Banevič in 2023

Personal information
- Born: 8 June 2007 (age 19) Vilnius, Lithuania
Medal record
Representing Lithuania
Breaking
Olympic Games
Silver medal – second place	2024 Paris	B-Girls
World Games
Bronze medal – third place	2025 Chengdu	B-Girls
WDSF World Championships
Gold medal – first place	2023 Leuven	B-Girls
Bronze medal – third place	2024 Chengdu	B-Girls
Bronze medal – third place	2025 Kurume	B-Girls
Red Bull BC One World Final
Runner-up	2024 Rio de Janeiro	B-Girls
European Games
Bronze medal – third place	2023 Kraków–Małopolska	B-Girls
WDSF European Championships
Gold medal – first place	2023 Almeria	B-Girls
FUJIFILM INSTAX Undisputed Masters
Winner	2022 London	Solo Women
Winner	2023 Tokyo World Final	Solo Women
Winner	2024 Tokyo World Final	Solo Women
Outbreak Europe
Winner	2021	1vs1 B-Girl
Winner	2023	1vs1 B-Girl
Winner	2024	1vs1 B-Girl

Dominika Banevič (Polish: Dominika Baniewicz; born 8 June 2007), also known as B-Girl Nicka, is a Lithuanian breakdancer of Polish ethnicity who won the 2023 European Championships title. In 2024, she won silver at the Paris 2024 Summer Olympics. She is one of the highest profile international b-girls, and represents as a Red Bull BC One All Star.

Nicka is known as an all-round breaker, whose style combines musicality, power moves and footwork, and aims to have a unique style and self-expression. Nicka also focuses on nutrition and psychology as part of the preparation for athletic competition.

== Career ==
Banevič is a student at the Polish-language John Paul II Gymnasium in Vilnius. She started practicing break dancing in September 2015. In 2021, she took part in the Polish School Youth Sports Games in Łomża. At the age of 16, she became world champion in Leuven in 2023. In 2023, Banevič won the Lithuanian national championships for the 4th time.

Banevič represented Lithuania in break dancing at the Paris 2024 Summer Olympics, and won the silver medal in a tightly contested final against Japanese bgirl Ami Yuasa. Nicka qualified from a group including home favourite Syssy, and former BC One champion Logistx and defeated both Chinese entrants Ying Zi and 671 in the finals. Upon returning to Lithuania, Česlav Okinčic, the former president of the Lithuanian Golf Federation, presented Dominika with a new electric car on behalf of the golf community and all nationalities of Vilnius.
