= 2021 WDSF European Breaking Championship =

International breakdancing competition

- Venue: Bolshoy Ice Dome
- Location: Sochi, Russia
- Dates: 26–27 June
- Competitors: 102 (50 men + 40 women in individual competitions) from 29 nations

The 2021 WDSF European Breaking Championship was an inaugural event and was held in Sochi, Russia, from 26 to 27 June 2021.

== Medal table ==
* Host nation (Russia)

Rank	Nation	Gold	Silver	Bronze	Total
1	Russia*	3	2	0	5
2	Spain	0	1	0	1
3	Belgium	0	0	1	1
3	Finland	0	0	1	1
3	Italy	0	0	1	1
Totals (5 entries)		3	3	3	9

== Medalists ==
Event	Gold	Silver	Bronze
B-Boy	Konstantin Eliseitsev; Russia	Jamal Asadulaev; Russia	Johannes Hattunen; Finland
B-Girl	Natalia Kiliachikhina; Russia	leksandra Vavilkina-Kachanova; Russia	Maxime Blieck; Belgium
Crew (5 vs 5)	Russia	Spain	Italy

== Participating nations ==
102 competitors from 29 nations participated:

1. Austria (5)
2. Belarus (3)
3. Belgium (4)
4. Croatia (4)
5. Czech Republic (3)
6. Denmark (4)
7. Estonia (5)
8. Finland (5)
9. France (3)
10. Georgia (2)
11. Germany (5)
12. Hungary (3)
13. Ireland (4)
14. Italy (5)
15. Latvia (1)
16. Lithuania (1)
17. Moldova (2)
18. Netherlands (3)
19. Norway (2)
20. Poland (2)
21. Portugal (5)
22. Romania (4)
23. Russia (5) (Host)
24. Spain (5)
25. Slovakia (3)
26. Slovenia (4)
27. Switzerland (4)
28. Sweden (2)
29. Turkey (4)
