= Breaking at the 2023 Pan American Games =

- Breaking pictogram
- Venues: Chimkowe Gym
- Start date: November 3, 2023
- End date: November 4, 2023
- No. of events: 2 (1 men, 1 women)
- Competitors: 32 from 12 nations

Breaking (breakdancing) competitions at the 2023 Pan American Games in Santiago, Chile were held between November 3 and 4th, 2023 at the Chimkowe Gym in Peñalolén, a suburb of Santiago.

On June 24, 2022, breaking was added to the sports program as the 39th sport, serving as a qualifier for its Olympic debut at Paris 2024. This will mark the sport's Pan American Games debut.

A total of two events are scheduled to be held, one each for men and women. A total of 32 athletes (16 per gender) are scheduled to compete.

== Qualification ==
A total of 32 breakdancers will qualify to compete (16 per gender). The host nation is guaranteed one sport per event. The other 15 spots will be awarded through the 2023 Pan American Championships and World Rankings list. A country can qualify a maximum of four athletes (two per gender).

== Participating nations ==
A total of 12 NOC's qualified breakdancers. The number of athletes a nation entered is in parentheses beside the name of the country.

- Argentina (2)
- Brazil (4)
- Canada (4)
- Chile (4)
- Colombia (3)
- Dominican Republic (1)
- Ecuador (2)
- Mexico (4)
- Peru (2)
- Puerto Rico (1)
- United States (4)
- Venezuela (1)

== Medal summary ==
=== Medal table ===
* Host nation (Chile)

Rank	NOC's	Gold	Silver	Bronze	Total
1	United States	1	1	1	3
2	Canada	1	0	0	1
3	Colombia	0	1	0	1
4	Chile*	0	0	1	1
Totals (4 entries)		2	2	2	6

=== Medalists ===
Event	Gold	Silver	Bronze
B-Boys	Philip Kim; Phil Wizard; Canada	Jeffrey Louis; Jeffro; United States	Matías Martínez; Matita; Chile
B-Girls	Sunny Choi; Sunny; United States	Luisa Tejada; Luma; Colombia	Vicki Chang; La Vix; United States

== 2024 Summer Olympics Qualification ==
This event was a direct qualification event for the 2024 Summer Olympics. A total of two quotas (one each for B-Boys and B-Girls) was awarded.

Event	Qualification path	Quotas	NOCs
B-Boys	One NOC of the winner, will earn one quota place.	1	Canada
B-Girls	One NOC of the winner, will earn one quota place.	1	United States
Total quota places awarded		2	

== See also ==
- Breaking at the 2024 Summer Olympics
