= Rytis Jasiūnas =

Lithuanian windsurfer (born 1994)

Personal information
- Nationality: Lithuanian
- Born: 20 July 1994 (age 32) Kaunas, Lithuania

Sport
- Sport: Sailing

Rytis Jasiūnas (born 20 July 1994) is a Lithuanian sailor who competes in windsurfing events. He competed at the 2024 Summer Olympics in the iQFoil event and was Lithuania's flagbearer at the Parade of Nations in the opening ceremony.

He has served as vice-president of the Professional Windsurfers Association since 2021.

== Biography ==
Jasiūnas is coached by Gintautas Bernotas. In 2012, he finished 23rd at the RS:X World Youth Championship. He later competed in the 2018 Funboard Slalom World Championship, finishing 22nd, and placed 19th at the 2019 Slalom World Championship. From 2020, Jasiūnas began competing in the iQFoil class. That year, he took part in his first European Championships in the discipline, finishing 32nd. In 2021, he competed at the iQFoil World Championships for the first time, finishing 57th. Since 2021, he has served as vice-president of the Professional Windsurfers Association. At the 2022 iQFoil European Championships, Jasiūnas achieved a career-best result, finishing 25th.

At the 2024 Summer Olympics, he competed in the iQFoil event. After 13 opening races, Jasiūnas finished 17th overall and did not advance to the final series. He also served as Lithuania's flag bearer during the opening ceremony of the Games.
