= Victor Montalvo =

American breakdancer (born 1994)

Personal information
- Full name: Victor Bernudez Montalvo
- Born: May 1, 1994 (age 32) Orlando, Florida, U.S.
- Home town: Kissimmee, Florida, U.S.
- Height: 5 ft 8 in (173 cm)

Sport
- Country: United States
- Sport: Breaking
Medal record
Breaking
Representing United States
Olympic Games
Bronze medal – third place	2024 Paris	B-Boys
WDSF World Championships
Gold medal – first place	2021 Paris	B-Boys
Gold medal – first place	2023 Leuven	B-Boys
Bronze medal – third place	2022 Seoul	B-Boys
Red Bull BC One World Final
Winner	2015 Rome	Breaking
Winner	2022 New York City	B-Boys
World Games
Gold medal – first place	2022 Birmingham	B-Boys
WDSF Pan American Championships
Bronze medal – third place	2023 Santiago	B-Boys
World Urban Games
Gold medal – first place	2019 Budapest	B-Boys
Outbreak Europe
Winner	2017	1vs1 Breaking
Winner	2019	1vs1 Breaking

Victor Bernudez Montalvo (born May 1, 1994), also known mononymously as Victor, is an American b-boy. He was born in Kissimmee, Florida to parents from Puebla, Mexico.

He participated at the 2022 World Games in the dancesport competition where he won the gold medal in the B-Boys event. He is also a two-time champion of Red Bull BC One, winning in 2015 and 2022. Montalvo became the first American to qualify for the Olympics in the sport of breaking.

He is married to Ukrainian-born b-girl Kateryna Pavlenko.
