= Sunny Choi =

American breakdancer (born 1988)

Personal information
- Born: November 10, 1988 (age 37) Cookeville, Tennessee, U.S.
- Home town: Queens, New York, U.S.
- Education: Wharton School
- Height: 5 ft 1 in (155 cm)

Sport
- Sport: Breaking
Medal record
Breaking
Representing United States
World Games
Silver medal – second place	2022 Birmingham	B-Girls
Pan American Games
Gold medal – first place	2023 Santiago	B-Girls
WDSF Pan American Championship
Silver medal – second place	2022 Santiago	B-Girls
World Urban Games
Silver medal – second place	2019 Budapest	B-Girls
FUJIFILM INSTAX Undisputed Masters
Winner	2023 New York	Solo Women

Grace Sun "Sunny" Choi (born November 10, 1988) is an American breakdancer who competed in the inaugural breaking competition at the 2024 Summer Olympics. She previously performed as a youth gymnast and a director at Estée Lauder before leaving to pursue breaking full-time. Choi participated at the 2022 World Games in the dancesport competition where she won the silver medal in the B-Girls event. In 2023, she won the first gold medal in breakdancing ever given at the Pan American Games. Because of that, she became the first American woman to qualify for Olympic breaking.

== Early life and education ==
Grace Sun "Sunny" Choi was born in November 10, 1988 in Cookeville, Tennessee, as the third of four children. Her parents, Jung-In and Kyung-Ju Choi, migrated from Daegu, South Korea for doctoral-level study at the University of Tennessee, with Jung-In going on to teach statistics at Tennessee Tech at the time of Sunny's birth. Her nickname, "Sunny", has been used by her family since birth; she also uses Sunny as her stage name when dancing to represent her warm personality. At the age of seven, her family moved to Louisville, Kentucky; Choi stated that her experiences with racism and alienation at predominantly white schools there led to an inferiority complex that impacted her into adulthood.

Choi showed an interest in gymnastics at an early age, which was sparked by watching the 1992 Olympic women's all around competition as a three year old. Her oldest brother Jin said that she "did cartwheels in diapers"; she even considered trying to compete in the Olympics when she was 12, but her family decided against it. However, a knee injury along with high expectations from herself and her family impacted her performance and spurred periods of depression. At times, she had suicidal ideation and fatigue-induced hallucinations. During this period, Choi was introduced to breakdancing (breaking) in 2007 by her younger brother, himself a breaker, later noting that she "thought it was cool but brushed it off, because who thinks anything their little brother shows them is cool?"

Choi decided to study business at the University of Pennsylvania's Wharton School. Although she joined the gymnastics team, she had to withdraw due to further injuries. Choi started breaking after walking home one night and noticing other students dancing on campus. She joined the school's breaking club, finding community and adrenaline as well as new ways to apply her gymnastic skills.

Through college, Choi continued breaking despite her initial feelings of not fitting in due to her Asian-American identity and previous lack of interest in hip-hop with the exception of a "miniature, teenage Dirty South music phase". She delved deeper into Philadelphia's breaking culture and her mother nearly pulled her out of college due to her increasing absences. Ultimately, she decided to stay in her program and graduated in 2011.

== Career ==
In 2012, Choi moved to Queens, New York City, where she currently lives. Choi started competing in international breaking events by 2014, going on to win silver at the World Urban Games in 2019. Nevertheless, Choi took on marketing and project management roles for financial security despite her lack of fulfillment with corporate environments, thinking of breaking as a hobby, and eventually joined Estée Lauder in 2021 as the director of global creative operations. Although the Olympics announced it would add breaking to its repertoire of sports that year, Choi initially thought that she could not balance her corporate career with the needs of the competition. At the 2022 World Games dancesport competition, Choi won the silver medal in the B-Girls event. In January 2023, six months after her win, she left Estée Lauder to focus on breaking and because her high-pressure corporate work contributed to her continuing cycles of depression. At the 2023 Pan American Games, Choi won the gold medal for breaking, the first ever given out, and thus qualified for the newly introduced breaking competition at the 2024 Summer Olympics, becoming the first American woman to do so. Choi has cited mental health and self-care as a core focus of her preparation, allowing her to address her insecurities and keep in touch with her emotions, which she attributes to improving and personalizing her dancing. She was eliminated in the round robin stage and did not make the quarterfinals. After the Olympics, Choi plans on opening a breaking center in Queens.
