= 2023 WDSF World Breaking Championship =

Breakdancing competition

- Location: Leuven, Belgium
- Dates: 22–24 September
- Competitors: 177 from 62 nations

The 2023 WDSF World Breaking Championship was held in Leuven, Belgium from September 22nd to September 24th, 2023.

The gold medalist in each category qualified for the Breaking competition at the 2024 Summer Olympics.

== Medal table ==
* Host nation (Belgium)

Rank	Nation	Gold	Silver	Bronze	Total
1	Lithuania	1	0	0	1
1	United States	1	0	0	1
3	Japan	0	1	1	2
4	Canada	0	1	0	1
5	France	0	0	1	1
Totals (5 entries)		2	2	2	6

== Medalists ==
Event	Gold	Silver	Bronze
B-Boy	Victor Montalvo; United States	Philip Kim; Canada	Shigeyuki Nakarai; Japan
B-Girl	Dominika Banevič; Lithuania	Ayumi Fukushima; Japan	Sya Dembélé; France

== Participating nations ==
177 competitors from 62 nations participated:

1. Albania (1)
2. Algeria (2)
3. Argentina (2)
4. Australia (4)
5. Austria (4)
6. Azerbaijan (2)
7. Belgium (4) (host)
8. Brazil (4)
9. Bulgaria (3)
10. Canada (4)
11. Chile (4)
12. China (4)
13. Cameroon (1)
14. Colombia (3)
15. Croatia (4)
16. Cyprus (2)
17. Czech Republic (3)
18. Denmark (4)
19. Ecuador (1)
20. England (4)
21. El Salvador (1)
22. Spain (4)
23. Estonia (2)
24. Finland (3)
25. France (4)
26. Germany (4)
27. Greece (1)
28. Guatemala (1)
29. Hong Kong (4)
30. Hungary (4)
31. Ireland (1)
32. Israel (4)
33. Italy (4)
34. Japan (4)
35. Kazakhstan (3)
36. South Korea (2)
37. Latvia (4)
38. Lithuania (3)
39. Morocco (1)
40. Malaysia (1)
41. Moldova (2)
42. Mexico (3)
43. Netherlands (2)
44. Nepal (1)
45. Norway (4)
46. Peru (1)
47. Philippines (1)
48. Poland (3)
49. Portugal (4)
50. Puerto Rico (1)
51. Romania (4)
52. Singapore (1)
53. Slovenia (3)
54. Switzerland (4)
55. Slovakia (3)
56. Sweden (4)
57. Chinese Taipei (4)
58. Turkey (3)
59. Ukraine (4)
60. United States (4)
61. Uzbekistan (3)
62. Venezuela (3)
