= Breaking at the 2023 European Games =

Breakdancing competitions

- Venue: Strzelecki National Park
- Dates: 26-27 June
- Competitors: 32

Breaking competition at the 2023 European Games took place from 26 to 27 June, 2023 at the Strzelecki National Park venue. Two quota places (one for women and one for men) for the Paris 2024 Olympic Games were available at the 2023 European Games.

== Participating nations ==
NOC	B-Boy	B-Girl	Total
Austria	1		1
Belgium	2	2	4
Finland		1	1
France	2	2	4
Germany		2	2
Great Britain	2		2
Israel		1	1
Italy	1	2	3
Lithuania		1	1
Netherlands	2	1	3
Norway	2		2
Poland	1	1	2
Portugal		1	1
Spain	1	1	2
Ukraine	2	1	3
Total: 15 NOCs	16	16	32

== Medal table ==
* Host nation (Poland)

Rank	NOC	Gold	Silver	Bronze	Total
1	Netherlands	1	1	0	2
2	France	1	0	0	1
3	Ukraine	0	1	0	1
4	Austria	0	0	1	1
4	Lithuania	0	0	1	1
Totals (5 entries)		2	2	2	6

== Medalists ==
Event	Gold	Silver	Bronze
B-Boy	Danis "Dany Dann" Civil; France	Menno "Menno" van Gorp; Netherlands	Fouad "Lil Zoo" Ambelj; Austria
B-Girl	India "India" Sardjoe; Netherlands	Anna "Stefani" Ponomarenko; Ukraine	Dominika "Nicka" Banevič; Lithuania
