= India Sardjoe =

Dutch breakdancer

Personal information
- Full name: India Dewi Sardjoe
- Nickname: B-Girl India
- Born: 19 May 2006 (age 20) The Hague, Netherlands

Sport
- Country: Netherlands
- Sport: Breaking
Medal record
Breaking
Representing Netherlands
WDSF World Championships
Gold medal – first place	2024 Chengdu	B-Girls
Red Bull BC One World Final
Winner	2022 New York City	B-Girls
Winner	2024 Rio de Janeiro	B-Girls
European Games
Gold medal – first place	2023 Kraków–Małopolska	B-Girls
WDSF European Championship
Gold medal – first place	2022 Manchester	B-Girls
FUJIFILM INSTAX Undisputed Masters
Winner	2024 Los Angeles	Solo Women

India Dewi Sardjoe (born 19 May 2006) is a Dutch breakdancer. She won the Red Bull BC One world title in 2022 and later qualified for the 2024 Summer Olympics, the first time breakdancing was featured at the games.

== Biography ==
Sardjoe was born in 2006 in The Hague, Netherlands. Her father is Indo-Surinamese while her mother is of half-Indian and half-Dutch descent. She played football when young and started taking hip hop dance classes, but switched to breakdancing at age seven. By age 10, she won the Dutch national championship in the U12 category. She is a member of the groups Heavyhitters and Hustlekidz and is coached by Ton Steenvoorden.

Sardjoe traveled internationally to attend different breakdancing tournaments and in 2022, she first won the Dutch championships, then the European championship, and the Red Bull BC One world championship in a six-month span. In 2023, she earned qualification for the 2024 Summer Olympics, featuring the first appearance of breakdancing at the Olympics. There, she defeated Manizha Talash in the pre-qualifying matchup, the first breakdancing battle in Olympic history, and advanced to the round-robin stage. She advanced from the round-robin tournament and ultimately finished in fourth place, losing in an 8–19 vote to Liu Qingyi in the bronze medal match.
