= Rachid Ghanimi =

Moroccan footballer (born 2001)

Personal information
- Date of birth: 25 April 2001 (age 25)
- Place of birth: Khouribga, Morocco
- Height: 6 ft 2 in (1.88 m)
- Position: Goalkeeper

Team information
- Current team: Wydad AC
- Number: 1

Senior career*
Years	Team	Apps	(Gls)
2020–2023	RC Oued Zem	16	(0)
2023–2026	Fath Union Sport	24	(0)
2026–	Wydad AC	2	(0)

International career
2023–	Morocco U23	1	(0)
2025–	Morocco A'	0	(0)
Medal record
Men's football
Representing Morocco
U-23 Africa Cup of Nations
Winner	2023 Morocco
African Nations Championship
Winner	2024 Kenya-Tanzania-Uganda
FIFA Arab Cup
Winner	2025 Qatar	Team
Olympic Games
Bronze medal – third place	2024 Paris	Team
- * Club domestic league appearances and goals

Rachid Ghanimi (born 25 April 2001) is a Moroccan professional footballer who plays as a goalkeeper for Botola club Wydad AC. He was selected for the Moroccan team at the 2024 Summer Olympics, winning a bronze medal with the Atlas Lions.

== Club career ==
Ghanimi signed his first professional contract with RC Oued Zem in 2020. He never played any games, mainly serving as the third-string goalkeeper. He was an unused substitute in a 2–0 loss to Hassania Agadir.

Seeking more regular game time, Ghanimi left Oued Zem in August 2023 to join Fath Union Sport in Rabat for an undisclosed fee. He made his Rabat debut in a 0–0 draw against Olympic Safi. Ghanimi also played in the following game against Hassania in a 3–1 win, with Ghanimi only conceding to a penalty. Ghanimi would also play in a 1–1 draw against MA Tétouan and in a 1–0 win against JS Soualem, with Ghanimi saving a penalty in the latter.

== International career ==
Ghanimi was called up to the Morocco national team to play in the friendlies against Cape Verde and South Africa. He appeared on the bench against South Africa but didn't play any games. Ghanimi also played one game for the Morocco U23, with Tarik Sektioui opting to give him a chance in a 2–0 win against the Wales U21. Ghanimi was a member of the Morocco squad that won the 2023 U-23 Africa Cup of Nations.

Ghanimi was included in Morocco's 2024 Summer Olympics squad. Morocco won the bronze medal.

== Honours ==
Morocco U23

- U-23 Africa Cup of Nations: 2023
- Olympic Bronze Medal: 2024

Morocco A'

- African Nations Championship: 2024
- FIFA Arab Cup: 2025
