= Antilai Sandrini =

Italian breakdancer

Personal information
- Nickname: Anti
- Nationality: Italian
- Born: 30 November 1997 (age 28)

Sport
- Country: Italy
- Sport: Breaking, Wushu
Medal record
Representing Italy
Breaking
WDSF European Championship
Silver medal – second place	2022 Manchester	B-Girls
Wushu Taolu
Mediterranean Championships
Silver medal – second place	2019 Marseille	Changquan
Silver medal – second place	2019 Marseille	Gunshu

Antilai Sandrini (born 30 November 1997) also known as Anti, is an Italian breakdancer.

She started breakdancing at 13 years old, after being introduced to it by her father. Sandrini has practiced gymnastics and cheerleading and is also an Italian Wushu Champion, having won silver medals in changquan and gunshu at the 2019 Mediterranean Wushu Championships.

Sandrini competed at the 2022 World Games in Birmingham, but was eliminated in the round-robin qualifiers. Two years later, she represented Italy in Breaking in the Paris 2024 Summer Olympics, and also did not progress.
