= Carlota Dudek =

French breakdancer (born 2002)

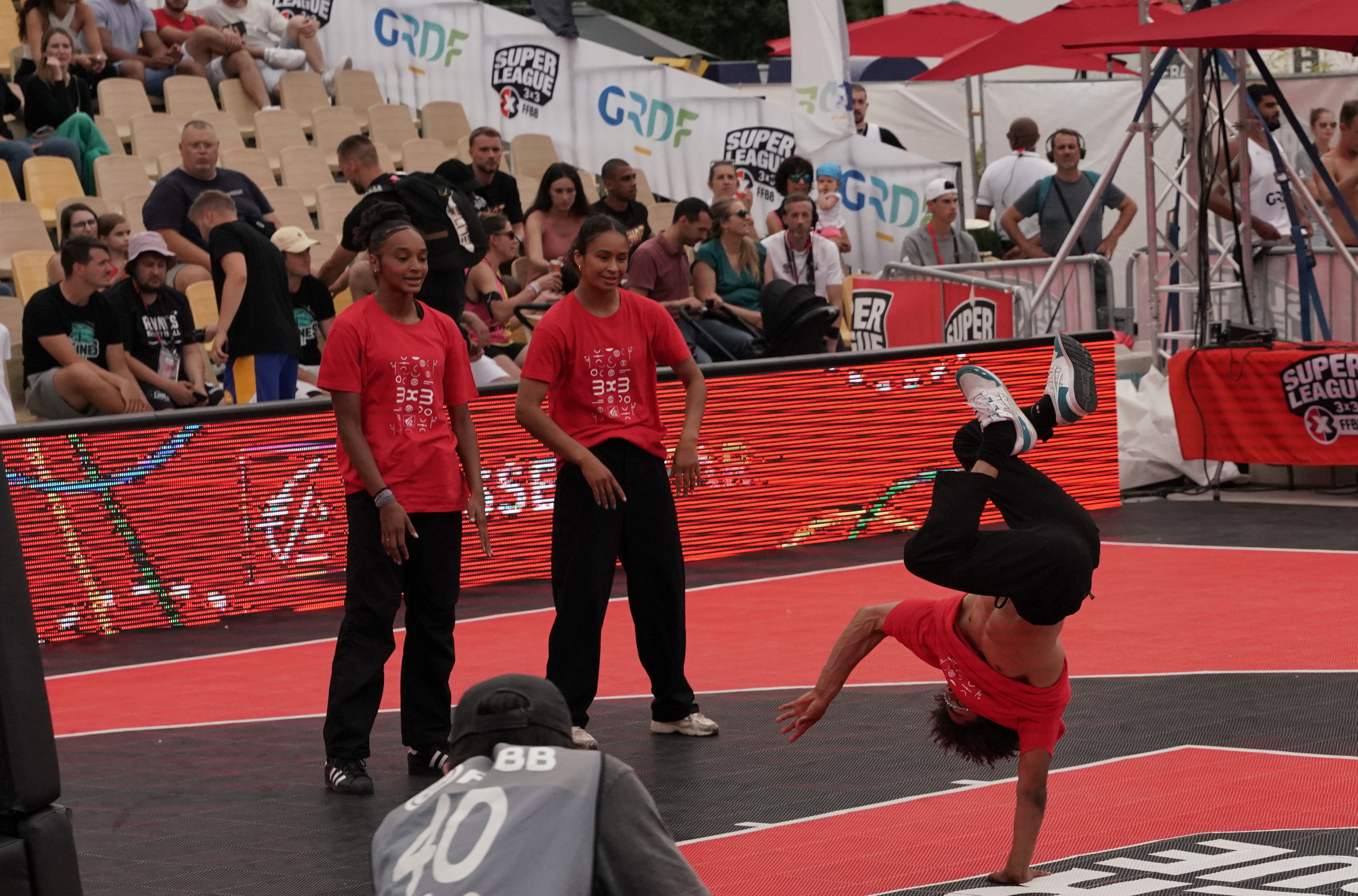
- Sya Dembélé and Carlota, 2022

Personal information
- Born: 5 November 2002 (age 23) Cadenet, Provence-Alpes-Côte d'Azur, France

Sport
- Sport: Breaking
Medal record
Breaking
Representing France
FUJIFILM INSTAX Undisputed Masters
Runner-up	2022 London	Solo Women

Carlota Dudek (born 5 November 2002) is a French breakdancer who competes under the nickname Señorita Carlota. She represented France at the 2024 Summer Olympics in Paris, the first time the sport of breaking has been included in the Olympics.

== Early and personal life ==
Dudek was born in Cadenet to a Cuban mother and Polish father. She began dancing at an early age.

As of 2020, Dudek was studying for a technical degree in business management.

== Career ==
Dudek began breaking in 2008, following a lesson in the sport at her primary school. For many years she practiced in the garage of her home.

In 2015, Dudek became the French Breaking Champion.

By 2018, Dudek was a member of the Break2Mars crew. At the 2018 Youth Olympic Games in Buenos Aires, Dudek came fifth in the breaking competition. The following year, she won the French Nationals Senior.

In 2022, Dudek modelled for a line of Adidas sportswear.
