= 2022 WDSF European Breaking Championship =

International breakdancing competition

- Venue: Belle Vue Sports Village, Kirkmanshulme Lane
- Location: Manchester, England
- Dates: 5–6 November
- Competitors: 241 (166 men + 75 women) from 31 nations

The 2022 WDSF European Breaking Championship was held in Manchester, England, from 5 to 6 November 2022.

== Medal table ==
* Host nation (England)

Rank	Nation	Gold	Silver	Bronze	Total
1	France	1	0	0	1
1	Netherlands	1	0	0	1
3	England*	0	1	0	1
3	Italy	0	1	0	1
5	Poland	0	0	1	1
5	Portugal	0	0	1	1
Totals (6 entries)		2	2	2	6

== Medalists ==
Event	Gold	Silver	Bronze
B-Boy	Danis Civil; France	Karam Singh; England	Igor Szymon Wypiór; Poland
B-Girl	India Sardjoe; Netherlands	Antilai Sandrini; Italy	Vanessa Marina Cartaxo Farinha; Portugal

== Participating nations ==
241 competitors from 31 nations participated:

1. Albania (1)
2. Austria (11)
3. Belgium (8)
4. Bulgaria (4)
5. Croatia (3)
6. Cyprus (2)
7. Czech Republic (3)
8. Denmark (2)
9. England (20) (Host)
10. Finland (6)
11. France (28)
12. Germany (15)
13. Hungary (7)
14. Ireland (7)
15. Israel (5)
16. Italy (22)
17. Latvia (4)
18. Lithuania (3)
19. Moldova (4)
20. Netherlands (9)
21. Norway (7)
22. Poland (10)
23. Portugal (3)
24. Romania (9)
25. Spain (12)
26. Slovakia (4)
27. Slovenia (6)
28. Switzerland (6)
29. Sweden (9)
30. Turkey (6)
31. Ukraine (5)
