= Kateryna Pavlenko (breaker) =

Ukrainian breakdancer (born 1995)

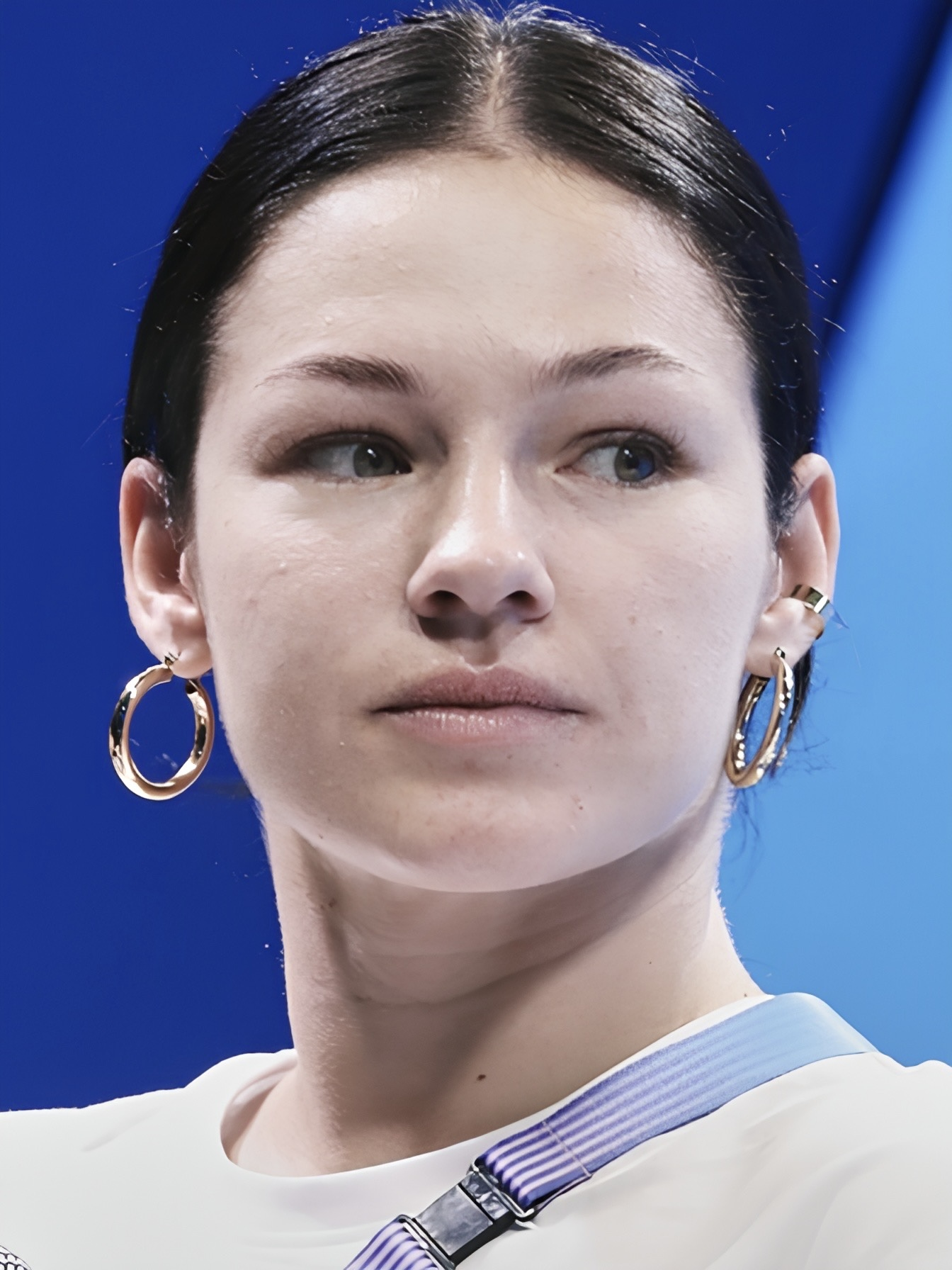
- Pavlenko in 2024

Personal information
- Born: 2 June 1995 (age 31) Kharkiv, Ukraine
Medal record
Breaking
Representing Ukraine
FUJIFILM INSTAX Undisputed Masters
Runner-up	2024 Los Angeles	Solo Women
Outbreak Europe
Winner	2013	1vs1 B-Girl
Winner	2017	1vs1 B-Girl
Winner	2018	1vs1 B-Girl

Kateryna Pavlenko (Ukrainian: Катерина Павленко; born 2 June 1995) also known as B-Girl Kate, is a Ukrainian breakdancer. She competed at the 2024 Summer Olympics and lost in the quarter-finals. Kate has claimed the Outbreak Europe championship title three times, triumphing in 2013, 2017, and 2018.

She is married to American b-boy Victor Montalvo.
