= Anna Ponomarenko =

Ukrainian breakdancer (born 1994)

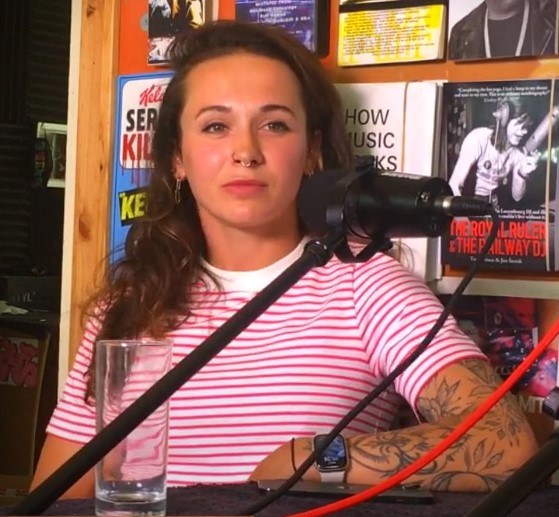
- Ponomarenko in 2023

Personal information
- Born: 26 June 1994 (age 32) Kharkiv, Ukraine
Medal record
Breaking
Representing Ukraine
European Games
Silver medal – second place	2023 Kraków–Małopolska	B-Girls
WDSF European Championships
Silver medal – second place	2023 Almeria	B-Girls
FUJIFILM INSTAX Undisputed Masters
Winner	2023 London	Solo Women
Runner-up	2024 The Notorious IBE	Solo Women

Anna Ponomarenko (Ukrainian: Анна Пономаренко; born 26 June 1994), also known as B-Girl Stefani, is a Ukrainian breakdancer who won silver at the 2023 European Games as well as silver at the 2023 European Championships. She competed at the 2024 Summer Olympics.
