= Sya Dembélé =

French breakdancer (born 2007)

- Dembélé in 2022

Personal information
- Born: 1 September 2007 (age 19) Saint-Étienne, France
Medal record
Breaking
Representing France
WDSF World Championships
Bronze medal – third place	2023 Leuven	B-Girls
WDSF European Championships
Bronze medal – third place	2023 Almeria	B-Girls
FUJIFILM INSTAX Undisputed Masters
Winner	2023 The Notorious IBE	Solo Women
Winner	2024 The Notorious IBE	Solo Women
Winner	2025 Tokyo World Final	Solo Women
Runner-up	2024 Tokyo World Final	Solo Women
WDSF Youth World Championship
Gold medal – first place	2024 Wuxi	B-Girls

Sya Dembélé (born 1 September 2007), also known mononymously as Syssy, is a French breakdancer.

== Early life and education ==
Sya Dembélé was born on 1 September 2007 in Saint-Étienne, France. She is the daughter of professional artists from the African dance group Doni Doni. Her father was a griot in Burkina Faso, while her mother is a choreographer.

Her family is passionate about dancing, and she started dancing at the age of eight. Her brother Damani also practises breakdancing, and she admired and emulated him. Her elder brother, Soso, also has a high profile in the breakdancing world.

== Career ==
Dembélé, under her stage name Syssy, has been dancing internationally since she was nine years old, evolving in the group Melting Force. The team was founded in 1999, and comprises around 15 members ranging from 10 to 40 years old.

Dembélé participated in her first international competition recognized by the World DanceSport Federation in early 2022 (being too young to participate before), finishing 27th (and 3rd French) in the 2022 European Breakdance Championship. In November 2022, she participated in the Red Bull BC One in New York City, the most prestigious international competition outside the federal circuit.

In December 2022, she represented France at the Battle of the Year in Okinawa, a leading international competition in the breakdance world.

On 7 May 2023, at the age of 16, Dembélé won the bronze medal at the 2023 European Breakdance Championship in Almería, qualifying her for the 2023 European Games but failed to reach the podium. In September, she won the bronze medal at the World Championships in Leuven.

In June 2024, Dembélé finished fourth in the Olympic Qualifier Series in Budapest, securing her ticket to the 2024 Summer Olympics where Ami Yuasa won the gold medal.
