= Zeng Yingying =

Chinese breakdancer

Personal information
- Native name: 曾莹莹
- Nickname: Ying Zi
- Nationality: Chinese
- Born: 12 April 1993 (age 32) Wenzhou, Zhejiang, China

Sport
- Country: China
- Sport: Breaking

Zeng Yingying (simplified Chinese: 曾莹莹; traditional Chinese: 曾瑩瑩; pinyin: Zēng Yíngyíng; born 12 April 1993), also known by her B-girl nickname Ying Zi, is a Chinese breakdancer who represented China at the 2024 Summer Olympic Games in the B-Girls competition.

== Biography ==
Zeng Yingying was born on 12 April 1993, in Wenzhou, China. She attended Ningbo University. She was introduced to breaking when she was 19 years old after being invited by a friend to try out the sport.

The only Chinese breakdancer at the first World Urban Games in Budapest in 2019, Ying Zi made it to the round of 16. She also competed at the 2022 Asian Games in Hangzhou and at the 2023 World Breaking Championships in Belgium. She later represented China in the B-Girls competition at the 2024 Summer Olympic Games.
