= Fatima El-Mamouny =

Moroccan breakdancer (born 1999)

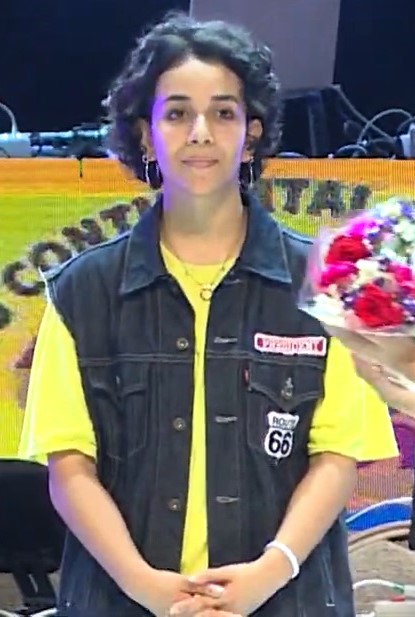
- El-Mamouny in 2023

Personal information
- Native name: فاطمة الزهراء الماموني
- Full name: Fatima Zahra El-Mamouny
- Nickname: Elmamouny
- Nationality: Moroccan
- Born: 20 July 1999 (age 26)

Sport
- Sport: Breaking
Medal record
Breaking
Representing Morocco
WDSF African Championship
Gold medal – first place	2024 Rabat	B-Girls

Fatima Zahra El-Mamouny (Arabic: فاطمة الزهراء الماموني, born 20 July 1999) is a Moroccan breakdancer who competes under the nickname Elmamouny. She and fellow breakdancer Bilal Mallakh were the first African breakdancers to ever qualify for the Olympics, and she competed at the 2024 Paris Olympics on 9 August.

== Career ==
El-Mamouny began breakdancing in the early 2010s, and initially performed with her friends on the street. She has said that she loves breaking because of its diversity and lack of barriers (including gender barriers), and for the confidence it gives her. One author for Forbes described her style as "funky, enthusiastic attitude" and noted she "clearly articulates both shapes and musical accents in her battle rounds".

In 2019, she won the 2019 Red Bull BC One Cypher, which secured her a spot at the 2019 Breaking World Final in Mumbai.

In March 2023, El-Mamouny won the Moroccan National Title in breaking. She then went on in May 2023 to win the inaugural WDSF African Breaking Championship, guaranteeing her a spot at the 2024 Paris Olympics. This win also made her one of the first two breakdancers to ever qualify for the sport at an Olympic level.

El-Mamouny trains for three or four hours each day.

== Personal life ==
El-Mamouny hails from the Moroccan capital, Rabat. In addition to breaking, El-Mamouny also dances in Afro, hip hop, and popping styles.
