= Ami Yuasa =

Japanese breakdancer (born 1998)

Ami Yuasa 湯浅亜実
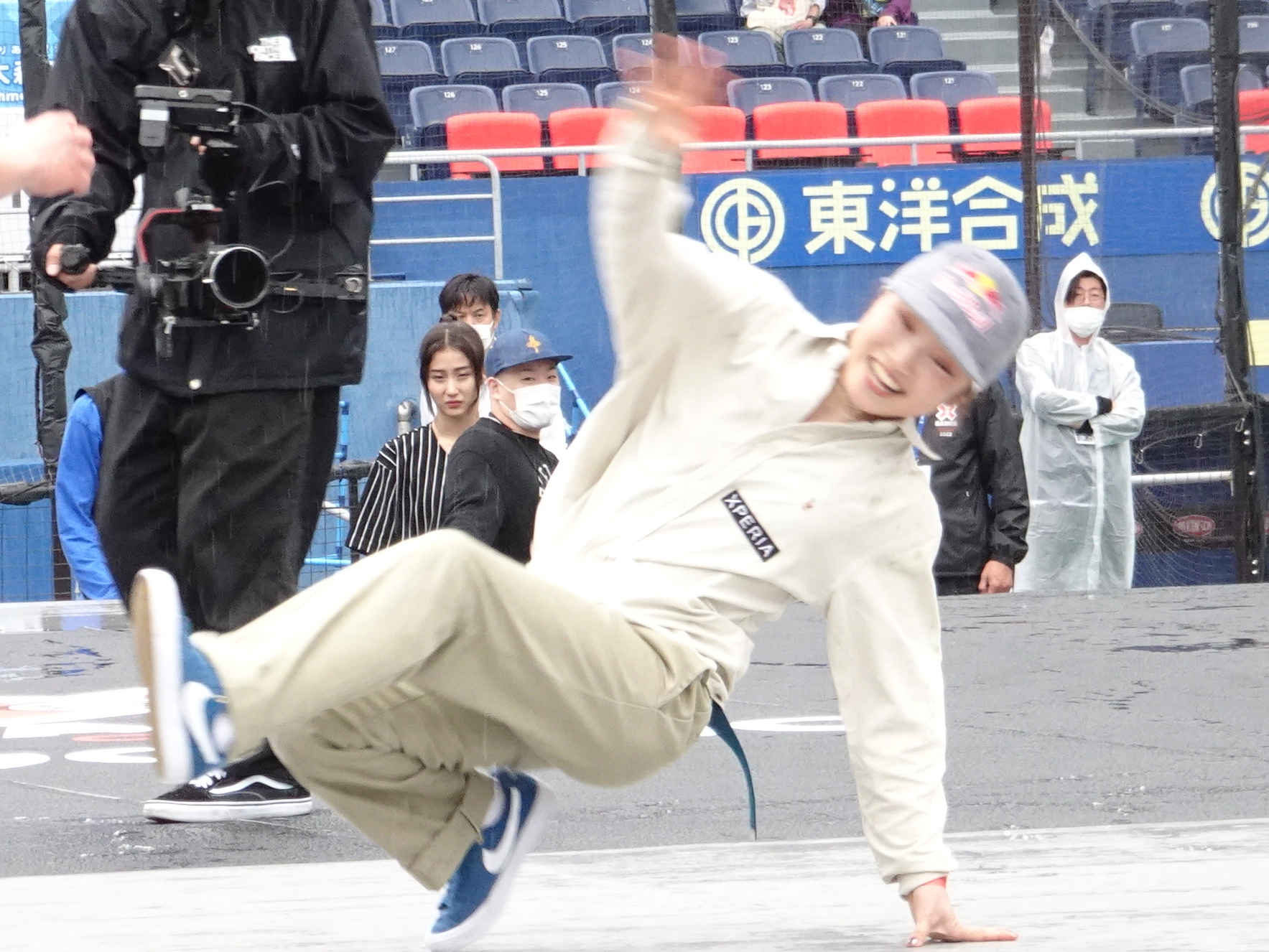
- Yuasa in 2022

Personal information
- Born: December 11, 1998 (age 27) Kawaguchi, Saitama Prefecture, Japan

Sport
- Country: Japan
- Sport: Breaking
Medal record
Breaking
Representing Japan
Olympic Games
Gold medal – first place	2024 Paris	B-Girls
WDSF World Championships
Gold medal – first place	2019 Nanjing	B-Girls
Gold medal – first place	2022 Seoul	B-Girls
Silver medal – second place	2021 Paris	B-Girls
Red Bull BC One World Final
Winner	2018 Zurich	B-Girls
Winner	2023 Paris	B-Girls
Olympic Qualifier Series
Gold medal – first place	2024 Budapest	B-Girls
Silver medal – second place	2024 Shanghai	B-Girls
World Games
Gold medal – first place	2022 Birmingham	B-Girls
Asian Games
Silver medal – second place	2022 Hangzhou	B-Girls
WDSF Asian Championship
Silver medal – second place	2023 Hangzhou	B-Girls
World Urban Games
Gold medal – first place	2019 Budapest	B-Girls

Ami Yuasa (湯浅 亜実, Yuasa Ami, born December 11, 1998), also known mononymously as Ami, is a Japanese breakdancer and Olympic gold medalist. She is the winner of the 2018 and 2023 Red Bull BC One world championship and the WDSF World Breaking Champions 2019 and 2022. She is a member of the Good Foot Crew.

== Early life and education ==
Yuasa was born in Kawaguchi, Saitama Prefecture. She graduated from Saitama Prefectural Kawaguchi High School and Komazawa University, Faculty of Letters, in the Department of English and American Literature.

== Career ==
Yuasa started learning hip hop in the first grade of elementary school due to the influence of her sister Ayu, who is four years older than her, and started breaking in the fifth grade.

In April 2018, Yuasa won the B-Girl World Final of Red Bull BC One held in Zurich, Switzerland. In 2019, she won the inaugural WDSF World Breaking Championship held in Nanjing, China. In September 2019, Yuasa won the 1st World Urban Championship held in Budapest, Hungary. In November 2020, she won the 2nd All Japan Breaking Championship in the Open B-Girl division. In 2021, Yuasa is the runner up in the 3rd WDSF World Breaking Championship held in Paris, France. Although she was unable to win for the second time in a row, she and her sister Ayu, who came in third, made it to the podium together.

Yuasa participated at the 2022 World Games in the dancesport competition where she won the gold medal in the B-Girls event. In October 2022, she won the 4th WDSF World Breaking Championships held in Seoul, South Korea for the second time, following her victory in 2019.

Yuasa represented Japan in Breaking in the 2024 Summer Olympics, winning the gold medal. Dominika Banevič of Lithuania took the silver medal.
