= Manizha Talash =

Afghan breakdancer (born 2002)

Personal information
- Nickname: Talash
- Nationality: Afghan
- Born: 22 December 2002 (age 23) Kabul, Afghanistan

Sport
- Sport: Breakdancing
- Team: Refugee Olympic Team

Manizha Talash (Dari: منیژه تلاش; born 22 December 2002), known competitively as b-girl Talash, is an Afghan breakdancer. She competed at the 2024 Summer Olympics in Paris as a member of the Refugee Olympic Team.

== Biography ==
Talash was born in 2002 and grew up in Kabul, Afghanistan. She first discovered breakdancing at age 17 through a Facebook video. She said that "When I saw a video online of a man just spinning over his head ... I immediately told myself: 'That's what I want to do with my life!'" She was able to get in contact with the man in the video and joined a breakdancing club in Kabul, called Superiors Crew, where she was one of 56 members and the only girl.

Talash was described by media sources as "Afghanistan's first female breakdancer", and she faced challenges as breakdancing is viewed negatively by many in Afghanistan. She continued breakdancing despite receiving opposition from her family and a number of death threats; her club was the target of bombings three times, with two going off and causing multiple deaths. The third was an attempted suicide bombing that was stopped by the police. Afterwards, the club was ordered to close for being a "major threat". Despite the difficulties, when asked whether she ever considered stopping, she replied: "I love breaking too much for that!"

After the Taliban took over Afghanistan in August 2021 and outlawed all forms of dancing for being "un-Islamic", Talash and her younger brother crossed over to Pakistan, where they lived for one year. She then moved to Spain as a refugee with her brother and six other members of her breakdancing club.

In 2024, through a friend, Talash was discovered by the Refugee Olympic Team and was selected for the 2024 Summer Olympics, which featured the Olympic debut of breakdancing. She competed in the Olympics, and wore a cape with the phrase "Free Afghan Women" on it in the pre-qualifier round. She lost the round 0–3 to India Sardjoe from the Netherlands, before the result was updated to her being disqualified for displaying a political slogan, which is a violation of rule 50 of the Olympic Charter. Talash stated that she intended to take legal action against the IOC over her disqualification because she said her message was not political, but rather "about human rights, freedom and gender equality". Her lawyers stated that a formal complaint would first be lodged through the World DanceSport Federation, and, depending on the outcome, they could take the case to the Court of Arbitration for Sport.

== Personal life ==
Talash learned Spanish after moving to Madrid in 2022. Her mother, who had been living in Afghanistan, moved to Spain to rejoin Talash and her brother in 2024. Talash enjoys dyeing her hair and she produced a streetwear fashion line inspired by traditional Afghan designs.
