= Bilal Mallakh =

Moroccan breakdancer (born 2003)

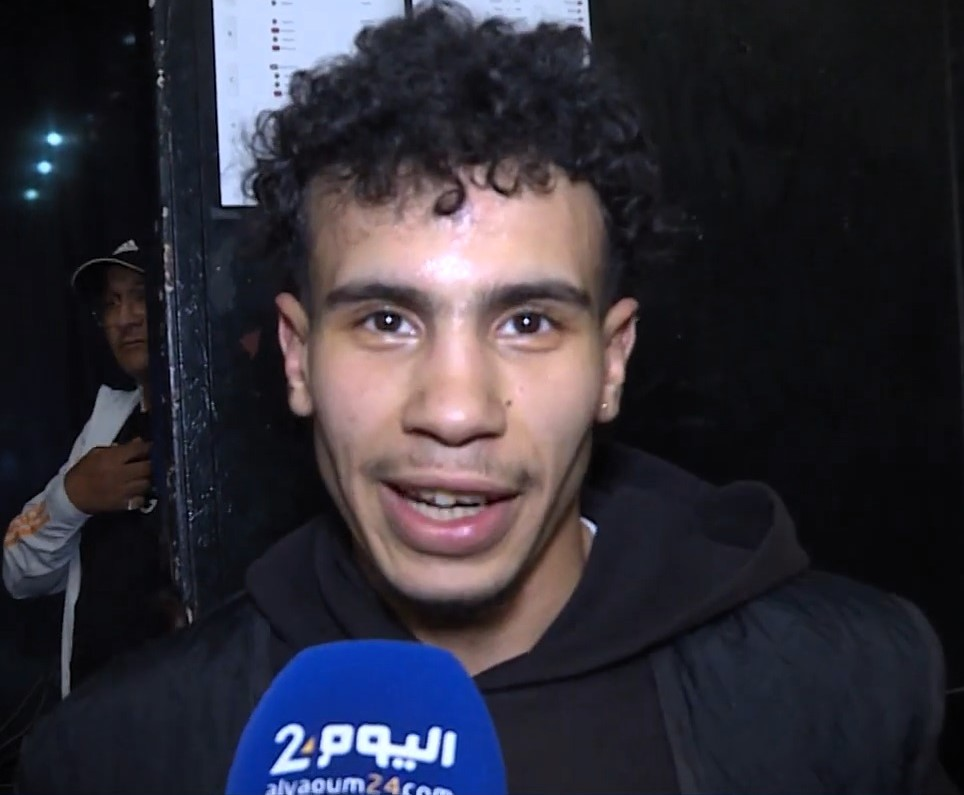
- Mallakh interviewed in 2023

Personal information
- Born: 24 November 2003 (age 22) Morocco

Sport
- Country: Morocco
- Sport: Breaking
Medal record
Breaking
Representing Morocco
African Championships
Gold medal – first place	2023 Rabat	B-Boys

Bilal Mallakh (Arabic: بلال ملاخ, born 24 November 2003) also known as B-Boy Billy, is a Moroccan breakdancer. He competed in the B-Boys event at the 2024 Summer Olympics.
