= Breaking at the 2024 Summer Olympics =

Breakdancing competition, 2024 Olympics

Breaking at the Games of the XXXIII Olympiad
- Venue: Place de la Concorde
- Dates: 9–10 August 2024
- No. of events: 2 (1 men, 1 women)
- Competitors: 33 from 16 nations

Breakdancing competitions at the 2024 Summer Olympics ran from 9 to 10 August at Place de la Concorde, making it the first dancesport discipline to appear in a Summer Olympics. Men's and women's events saw 16 b-boys and 17 b-girls compete in face-to-face single battles.

The Paris organizers added it, along with sport climbing and surfing, as an optional (temporary) sport after its debut at the 2018 Summer Youth Olympics in Buenos Aires. IOC president Thomas Bach said the sport was added to draw more interest from young people to the Olympics, while IOC sports director Kit McConnell said, "It's up to each local organizing committee to determine which [additional] sports to put forward that fit with their vision of the Games. Obviously, breaking fit very clearly with Paris's vision of a very youth-focused urban engagement."

As of 2024, the sport is not slated for inclusion at the 2028 Summer Olympics in Los Angeles, whose list of optional sports includes baseball, softball, cricket, flag football, lacrosse, and squash. World DanceSport Federation (WDSF), the sport's governing body, was said to be trying to get breaking included in the 2032 Summer Olympics in Brisbane.

== Competition format ==
The breaking competition comprised two gender-based medal events (one for men and the other for women) where sixteen B-Boys and sixteen B-Girls competed against each other.

The competition began with a round robin stage. The 16 breakers were split in four groups and danced against the others in their group for a minute each. The two best breakers from each group progressed to the knockout stage, where breakers were eliminated from the competition after losing a one-on-one match.

=== Scoring ===
A panel of nine judges scored each battle round using five equally-weighted criteria:

- Technique: The correct execution of moves, as well as athleticism, body control, dynamics, space control, form, lines and shape.
- Vocabulary: The number and variety of moves. A high score requires a diverse set of moves in multiple positions. Moves are grouped into toprock (dance elements executed while standing), downrock (spinning on the floor, combined with footwork, drops and transitions) and freeze (a stop in an acrobatic position).
- Execution: The clean performance of moves, and the distinction of moves from one another so that they flow, but not blend, into another.
- Musicality: How well the breaker reacts to and expresses the music, which is provided by a tournament staff DJ and not known to the breakers before the match.
- Originality: How the breaker "wows" the audience by making the dance their own.

For each round, the judge casts a vote in favor of one of the competitors, with the majority vote getter winning that particular round. Following the end of the match, the total number of rounds won and votes received are revealed.

=== Placing ===
In the round-robin stage, the competitors went head-to-head for two rounds. They were eventually ranked by total number of rounds won, then number of total votes, and then seeding, with the top two in each group advancing. The rest were pooled and sorted for 9th to 16th place with the same criteria.

In the knockout stage, the competitors went head-to-head for three rounds. Whoever won the most rounds won the match and advanced. Those who lost in the quarterfinal were sorted by the number of knockout rounds won, then the number of knockout votes, and then the round-robin criteria. Those who lost in the semi-finals competed in the bronze medal match.

== Qualification ==
A total of 32 quota places (sixteen each for B-Girls and B-Boys) were available for eligible dancers to compete for the inaugural medals in breaking. NOCs could enter a maximum of four breakers (two per gender) across two medal events.

Over eighty percent of the total quota was attributed to a large number of breakers through a tripartite qualification route. First, the 2023 WDSF World Championships, scheduled for 23 to 24 September in Leuven, Belgium, awarded the B-Boy and B-Girl champion with a direct quota place for Paris 2024. Second, a quintet of spots were assigned to the highest-ranked eligible breakers (one B-Boy and one B-Girl) competing in each of the designated continental meets (Africa, Americas, Asia, Europe, and Oceania), respecting the two-member NOC limit. The remaining breakers were provided the final opportunity to book their slots for Paris 2024 through a four-month-long Olympic Qualifier Series, held between March and June 2024 in various locations worldwide.

The host nation France reserved a spot each for a B-Boy and a B-Girl in their respective breaking events, while four more places (two per gender) were entitled to the eligible NOCs interested to have their breakers compete for Paris 2024 through a Universality invitation. To be registered for a spot according to the criteria of the universality principle, breakers must have finished within the top 32 of their respective events in the final rankings of the four-month-long Olympic Qualifier Series.

== Officials ==
The judges for the competition were:

Name	Nickname	NOC	Role
Po-Chun Chen	Bojin	Chinese Taipei	Chair
Martin Gilian	MGbility	Slovakia	Head Judge
Judes Ferdinand Abdoul	Dom:k	France	Judge
Dae Kyun Hwang	Virus	South Korea	Judge
Moises Rivas	Moy	United States	Judge
Messias Chardison Pereira	Migaz	Brazil	Judge
Andrii Kurnosov	Intact	Ukraine	Judge
Jess Heredia Rodriguez	Jess	Spain	Judge
Kazuhiro Arakaki	Kazuhiro	Japan	Judge
Friederike Frost	Frost	Germany	Judge
Jiulong Lian	Kowloon	China	Judge

The hosts and DJs for the competition were:

Name	Nickname	NOC	Role
João Oliveira Freitas	Max	Portugal	Host
Malik Moujouil	Malik	France	Host
Marcin Przeplasko	Plash One	Poland	DJ
Stephen Fleg	Fleg	United States	DJ

390 songs were cleared for use in the competition. The genres used included hip hop, soul, funk, jazz, latin, and rock. Many of the songs are commonly used in breaking competitions worldwide.

Some of the songs and instrumentals that were played included A Tribe Called Quest's "Scenario", The Incredible Bongo Band's "Apache", Roberto Roena's "Que Se Sepa", JID's "Never", Yellow Sunshine's "Yellow Sunshine", Method Man's "Judgement Day", Eric B. & Rakim's "Know the Ledge", Booker T. Averheart's "Heart N' Soul", Babe Ruth's "The Mexican", Choker Campbell's "Carioca", and James Brown's "Get Up, Get Into It, Get Involved".

== Competition schedule ==
Legend
Q	Qualification	F	Final

A = Afternoon session, starting at 16:00 local time (15:00 UTC).
E = Evening session, starting at 20:00 local time (19:00 UTC).

Schedule
Event ↓ / Date →	Fri 9		Sat 10	
B-Boys			Q	F
B-Girls	Q	F		

== Participating NOCs ==
In total 33 breakers from 16 nations are:

- Australia (2)
- Canada (1)
- China (3)
- Chinese Taipei (1)
- France (4) Host
- Italy (1)
- Japan (4)
- Kazakhstan (1)
- Lithuania (1)
- Morocco (2)
- Netherlands (3)
- Portugal (1)
- Refugee Olympic Team (1)
- South Korea (1)
- Ukraine (3)
- United States (4)

== Medal summary ==
=== Medal table ===
* Host nation (France)

Rank	NOC	Gold	Silver	Bronze	Total
1	Canada	1	0	0	1
1	Japan	1	0	0	1
3	France*	0	1	0	1
3	Lithuania	0	1	0	1
5	China	0	0	1	1
5	United States	0	0	1	1
Totals (6 entries)		2	2	2	6

=== Medalists ===
The winners were as follows:

Event	Gold	Silver	Bronze
B-Boys	Philip Kim; Phil Wizard; Canada	Danis Civil; Dany Dann; France	Victor Montalvo; Victor; United States
B-Girls	Ami Yuasa; Ami; Japan	Dominika Banevič; Nicka; Lithuania	Liu Qingyi; 671; China

== Controversy ==
The event was somewhat overshadowed and marred by the controversy generated on social media over Australian breaker Rachael Gunn's performance and choice of clothing. There was also an extended period of online bullying after misinformation was spread about the selection process.

== See also ==
- Breaking at the 2023 Pan American Games
