= Jeff Dunne (breakdancer) =

Australian breakdancer (born 2007)

Personal information
- Full name: Jeffrey Dan Arpie Dunne
- Born: 10 October 2007 (age 19) Davao City, Philippines
- Home town: Casuarina, Northern Territory

Sport
- Country: Australia
- Sport: Breaking
- Coached by: Liam Masters

Jeffrey Dan Arpie Dunne (born 10 October 2007), also known as J Attack, is an Australian breakdancer. He competed in the B-Boys event at the 2024 Summer Olympics.
