= Logan Edra =

American breakdancer (born 2003)

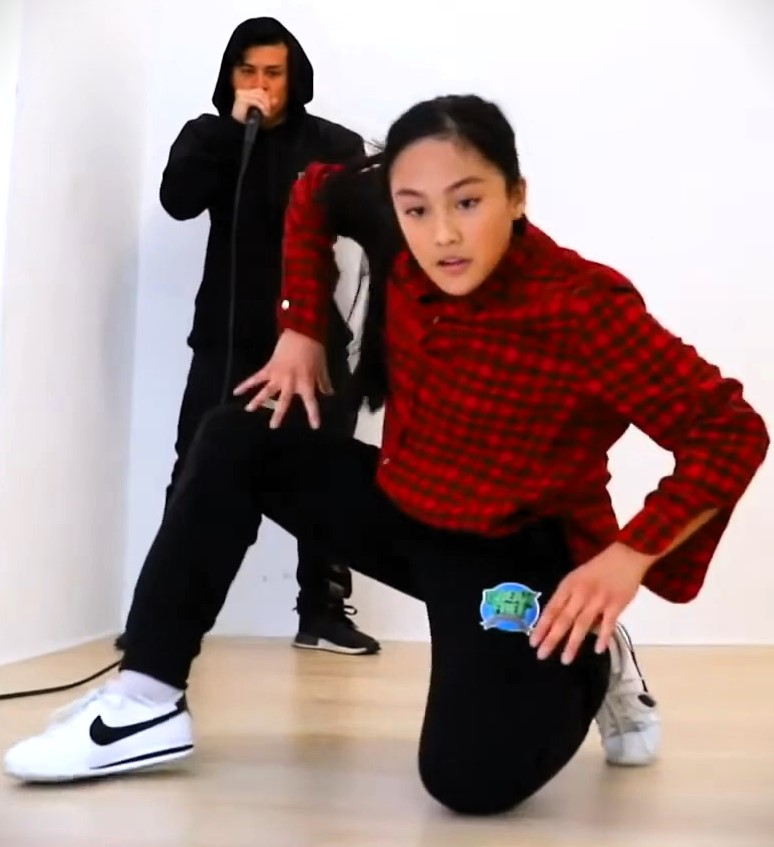
- Edra breakdances in 2020

Personal information
- Full name: Logan Elanna Edra
- Nickname: B-Girl Logistx
- Born: May 8, 2003 (age 23) Chula Vista, California, U.S.
- Height: 5 ft 1 in (155 cm)

Sport
- Country: United States
- Sport: Breaking
Medal record
Breaking
Representing United States
Red Bull BC One World Final
Winner	2021 Gdańsk	B-Girls
Runner-up	2022 New York City	B-Girls
WDSF Pan American Championship
Bronze medal – third place	2023 Santiago	B-Girls
World Urban Games
Bronze medal – third place	2019 Budapest	B-Girls

Logan Elanna Edra (born May 8, 2003), known by her nickname B-Girl Logistx (pronounced "logistics"), is an American breakdancer. She qualified for the United States at the 2024 Summer Olympics, featuring the debut of breakdancing at the Olympics.

== Biography ==
Edra was born on May 8, 2003, in Chula Vista, California, and has Filipino ancestry. She took ballet classes when young, but was unable to continue due to costs associated with classes. When she was age seven, her father suggested trying out hip hop dance classes; Edra said that "I told my dad I didn't want to try it, that I was scared, but he wanted me to try it." She said he responded by tricking her into attending the classes, telling her that she was going to be attending art classes instead. According to NBC: "She quickly became hooked, inspired by her B-girl teacher and the feeling of bliss that hip-hop brought her. Hip-hop classes quickly turned to breakdancing classes, and her career continued from there."

Edra was nicknamed "Logistx" by her father at age 10, and went on a strict schedule to develop as a dancer, which included gymnastics classes. She began competing in breaking competitions and won the Silverback Open B-Girl tournament in Philadelphia in 2018. In 2020, she traveled to Singapore and won the Junior 7 to Smoke breaking competition. Around that time, she moved to South Florida, where she later opened a dance studio. She competed at the Red Bull BC One World Final in 2021 and won the title, becoming both the youngest winner and the first American winner in the women's category. Edra later won a bronze medal at the WDSF 2023 Pan American Championship and was selected for the 2024 Olympic Qualifier Series; her performance there led her to be chosen to compete for the United States at the 2024 Summer Olympics, the first time breakdancing was featured at the games. She will be participating in the upcoming World of Street Woman Fighter this upcoming May 27, 2025 under the crew, Motiv.
