= WDSF European Breaking Championship =

European championship in breaking

European Breaking Championships
- Status: active
- Genre: sporting event
- Date: mid-year
- Frequency: annual
- Country: varying
- Inaugurated: 2021

The WDSF European Breaking Championship are the continental championships for breaking in Europe. The championships are organised by the World DanceSport Federation (WDSF). The first edition of the championships took place in 2021 in Sochi. It takes place annually.

== List of European Championships ==
#	Year	Venue	Date
1	2021	(Russia) Sochi	26–27 June
2	2022	(England) Manchester	5–6 November
3	2023	(Spain) Almeria	6–7 May
4	2025	TBD	April–May

== See also ==
- WDSF World Breaking Championship
