= World Urban Games =

International multi-sport event organized

Logo

The World Urban Games (WUG) is a multi-sport event featuring both competition and showcase urban sports alongside a cultural festival. The first edition was held in Budapest, Hungary from 13 to 15 September 2019. The event is now organised by SportAccord following the dissolution of the Global Association of International Sports Federations (GAISF).

== History ==
The event is the brainchild of the former GAISF President, the late Patrick Baumann. Although Baumann's death occurred before the first games, the project was maintained by the new executive of GAISF, and finally announced in 2018, with the first two editions originally awarded to Los Angeles, California. Disagreement over the program led to the venue of the first two editions being changed to Budapest, Hungary. The Games are designed as a showcase for new, urban sports and lifestyle.

== List of World Urban Games ==
Edition	Year	Host city	Host nation	Start Date	End Date	Nations	Competitors	Sports	Events
1	2019	Budapest	Hungary	13 September	15 September		300	8	18
2	TBD			Future event					

== Sports ==
Sport (Discipline)	Body	2019
BMX freestyle	UCI	2
3x3 basketball	FIBA	2
Indoor rowing	World Rowing	2
Breaking	WDSF	2
Parkour	FIG	4
Flying disc	WFDF	1
Laser run	UIPM	3
Roller freestyle	World Skate	2
Total events		18
