= Menno van Gorp =

Dutch breakdancer (born 1989)

Personal information
- Nickname: Menno
- Born: 7 February 1989 (age 37) Tilburg, Netherlands

Sport
- Sport: Breaking
Medal record
Breaking
Representing Netherlands
WDSF World Championships
Gold medal – first place	2019 Nanjing	B-Boys
Red Bull BC One World Final
Winner	2014 Paris	Breaking
Winner	2017 Amsterdam	Breaking
Winner	2019 Mumbai	B-Boys
Winner	2024 Rio de Janeiro	B-Boys
European Games
Silver medal – second place	2023 Kraków–Małopolska	B-Boys
WDSF European Championships
Gold medal – first place	2023 Almeria	B-Boys
World Urban Games
Silver medal – second place	2019 Budapest	B-Boys
Outbreak Europe
Winner	2015	2vs2 Breaking

Menno van Gorp (born 7 February 1989) is a Dutch breakdancer who performs mononymously as Menno.

Menno has won the Red Bull BC One four times, surpassing Hong 10 for the most titles won by a breaker. He won gold at the WDSF World Breaking Championship in 2019 and the European Breaking Championship in 2023. He represented the Netherlands in the 2024 Summer Olympics.

Menno was born in Tilburg and began breaking at age twelve. He practiced Judo before breaking, switching because he enjoyed the "freedom" he felt breaking gave him. His first competition was in 2007 at age 18.

He also enjoys photography, theatre, painting and fashion. He enjoys jazz music and collects jazz records.
