= Lee-Lou Demierre =

Dutch breakdancer (born 2001)

Personal information
- Nickname: Lee
- Born: 21 June 2001 (age 25) Amsterdam, Netherlands

Sport
- Sport: Breaking
Medal record
Breaking
Representing Netherlands
Red Bull BC One World Final
Runner-up	2022 New York City	B-Boys
Olympic Qualifier Series
Gold medal – first place	2024 Shanghai	B-Boys
Gold medal – first place	2024 Budapest	B-Boys
WDSF European Championships
Silver medal – second place	2023 Spain	B-Boys

Lee-Lou Demierre (born 21 June 2001) is a Dutch breakdancer who performs under the name B-Boy Lee.

== Early life ==
Lee was born and grew up in Amsterdam. His mother was a b-girl, which led to his interest in breakdancing. He began dancing at two years old.

== Career ==
Lee made the finals in the 2022 Red Bull BC One and the 2023 WDSF European Continental Championship, which sent him to the Olympic Qualifier Series, where he came first in Shanghai and Budapest. Scoring a perfect 100 points overall, he qualified for the 2024 Summer Olympics. He made it to the final eight in the Olympics, but lost 3–0 to Phil Wizard.

He is part of the breakdancing crew Ruggeds.

== Other ventures ==
Lee also makes music under the name Waterbreh.
