= Red Bull BC One =

Breakdancing competition

Red Bull BC One is an annual international breakdancing (B-Boy) competition, established in 2004. The competition is organised by the beverage company Red Bull. Its first event was held in Biel, Switzerland in 2004.

The competition's main event is a knockout tournament, featuring sixteen break dancers. The format involves one-on-one battles judged by a panel of five experienced judges

Red Bull BC One's has regional finals held in various parts of the world, including North America, Eastern Europe, Western Europe, Latin America, Asia Pacific, the Middle East and Africa. These regional winners compete in the World Finals, representing their regions internationally.

In the 2004 and 2005 events Red Bull BC released an official video that has been criticized due to restrictive music playing rights, as the live music played during the competition had to be dubbed over. From 2006 onwards, Red Bull stopped releasing DVDs and made the videos available online for free. In 2007, Alastair Siddons directed a film about the Red Bull BC One 2007 competition. The film was released in 2009 under the title, Turn it Loose.

Since 2014, Red Bull BC One has partnered with the World B-Boy Series to help create Undisputed, which crowns a solo world B-Boy champion.

== Winners ==
Year	Location	B-Boy winner	Crew	B-Girl Winner	Crew
2004	Biel, Switzerland	(United States) Omar	Mighty Zulu Kingz		
2005	Berlin, Germany	(France) Lilou	Pockemon		
2006	São Paulo, Brazil	(South Korea) Hong 10	Drifterz		
2007	Johannesburg, South Africa	(United States) Ronnie	Full Force / Super Cr3w		
2008	Paris, France	(South Korea) Wing	Jinjo		
2009	New York City, United States	(Algeria) Lilou	Pockemon		
2010	Tokyo, Japan	(Brazil) Neguin	Tsunami All-Stars		
2011	Moscow, Russia	(United States) Roxrite	Renegade Rockers / Squadron		
2012	Rio de Janeiro, Brazil	(France) Mounir	Vagabonds		
2013	Seoul, South Korea	(South Korea) Hong 10	Drifterz / 7 Commandoz		
2014	Paris, France	(Netherlands) Menno	Hustle Kidz		
2015	Rome, Italy	(United States) Victor	Squadron / MF Kidz / Backyard Funk		
2016	Nagoya, Japan	(Japan) Issei	Foundnation		
2017	Amsterdam, Netherlands	(Netherlands) Menno	Hustle Kidz		
2018	Zurich, Switzerland	(Morocco) Lil Zoo	Lhiba King Zoo / El Mouwahidin / Flying Steps	(Japan) Ami	Good Foot Crew
2019	Mumbai, India	(Netherlands) Menno	Hustle Kidz	(Russia) Kastet	3:16
2020	Salzburg, Austria	(Japan) Shigekix	K.A.K.B.	(Russia) Kastet	3:16
2021	Gdańsk, Poland	(Kazakhstan) Amir	Predatorz	(United States) Logistx	Underground Flow
2022	New York City, United States	(United States) Victor	Squadron / MF Kidz / Backyard Funk	(Netherlands) India	Hustle Kidz / Heavyhitters
2023	Paris, France	(South Korea) Hong 10	Flow XL	(Japan) Ami	Good Foot Crew
2024	Rio de Janeiro, Brazil	(Netherlands) Menno	Hustle Kidz	(Netherlands) India	Hustle Kidz / Heavyhitters
2025	Tokyo, Japan	(Japan) Issin	Body Carnival	(Japan) Riko	One Piece Crew
2026	Toronto, Canada				

== Yearly editions ==
=== 2025 ===
The Red Bull BC One took place in Tokyo on November 9, 2025.

Judges:

- (Colombia) Luma (Peligrosos)
- (South Korea) Kill (Gamblerz / C.A.Y. Crew)
- (United States) Ronnie Ruen (Style Elements)
- (United States) Cloud (Skill Methodz)
- (Finland) Ata (Ghost Crew)

MC:

- (Switzerland) Amjad ($7 Crew)
- (Japan) Kensaku

DJ:

- (United Kingdom) DJ KhanFu

B-boy World Final

Location: Tokyo, Japan

Round of 16
(Italy) Jet Leg^{1}	1
(Netherlands) **Lee**^{2}	**4**
(Belgium) Djibril^{1}	1
(Japan) **Shigekix**^{2}	**4**
**(Japan) Issin**^{2}	**5**
(Kazakhstan) Amir^{1}	0
(Venezuela) Alvin^{3}^{1}	1
(United States) **Icey Ives**^{2}	**4**
(Canada) Fléau^{2}	2
(Italy) **Pesto**^{3}^{1}	**3**
**(Venezuela) Mighty Jake**^{2}	**5**
(Netherlands) Lorenzo^{3}^{1}	0
(Denmark) Griimsen^{1}	1
(South Korea) **FE**^{2}	**4**
(Japan) Hiro10^{1}	0
(Japan) **Haruto**^{3}^{2}	**5**

Quarter-finals
(Netherlands) Lee^{1}	1
(Japan) **Shigekix**^{2}	**4**
(Japan) **Issin**^{1}	**4**
(United States) Icey Ives^{2}	1
(Italy) Pesto^{3}^{2}	2
(Venezuela) **Mighty Jake**^{1}	**3**
(South Korea) FE^{2}	1
(Japan) **Haruto**^{3}^{1}	**4**

Semi-finals
(Japan) Shigekix^{2}	0
(Japan) **Issin**^{1}	**5**
(Venezuela) Mighty Jake^{1}	0
(Japan) **Haruto**^{3}^{2}	**5**

Final
(Japan) **Issin**^{1}	**3**
(Japan) Haruto^{3}^{2}	2
Third place

3. Qualified via Last Chance Cypher

- ^{1} means they went first in the battle, ^{2} means they went second in the battle

Judge Votes
Battle	(United States) Ronnie Ruen	(Finland) Ata	(Colombia) Luma	(South Korea) Kill	(United States) Cloud	Total Score
(Italy) Jet Leg vs **(Netherlands) Lee**	(Netherlands) Lee	(Italy) Jet Leg	**(Netherlands) Lee**	**(Netherlands) Lee**	**(Netherlands) Lee**	1-**4**
**(Belgium)** Djibril vs **(Japan) Shigekix**	(Japan) Shigekix	**(Japan) Shigekix**	**(Japan) Shigekix**	**(Japan) Shigekix**	**(Belgium)** Djibril	1-**4**
**(Japan) Issin** vs **(Kazakhstan)** Amir	(Japan) Issin	**(Japan) Issin**	**(Japan) Issin**	**(Japan) Issin**	**(Japan) Issin**	**5**-0
**(Venezuela)** Alvin vs **(United States) Icey Ives**	(United States) Icey Ives	**(United States) Icey Ives**	**(United States) Icey Ives**	**(Venezuela)** Alvin	**(United States) Icey Ives**	1-**4**
**(Canada)** Fléau vs **(Italy) Pesto**	(Italy) Pesto	**(Canada)** Fléau	**(Italy) Pesto**	**(Canada)** Fléau	**(Italy) Pesto**	2-**3**
**(Venezuela) Mighty Jake** vs **(Netherlands)** Lorenzo	(Venezuela) Mighty Jake	**(Venezuela) Mighty Jake**	**(Venezuela) Mighty Jake**	**(Venezuela) Mighty Jake**	**(Venezuela) Mighty Jake**	**5**-0
**(Denmark)** Griimsen vs **(South Korea) FE**	(South Korea) FE	**(South Korea) FE**	**(Denmark)** Griimsen	**(South Korea) FE**	**(South Korea) FE**	1-**4**
**(Japan)** Hiro10 vs **(Japan) Haruto**	(Japan) Haruto	**(Japan) Haruto**	**(Japan) Haruto**	**(Japan) Haruto**	**(Japan) Haruto**	0-**5**
(Netherlands) Lee vs **(Japan) Shigekix**	(Japan) Shigekix	**(Japan) Shigekix**	(Netherlands) Lee	**(Japan) Shigekix**	**(Japan) Shigekix**	1-**4**
**(Japan) Issin** vs (United States) Icey Ives	(Japan) Issin	**(Japan) Issin**	**(Japan) Issin**	**(Japan) Issin**	(United States) Icey Ives	**4**-1
(Italy) Pesto vs **(Venezuela) Mighty Jake**	(Venezuela) Mighty Jake	(Italy) Pesto	**(Venezuela) Mighty Jake**	**(Venezuela) Mighty Jake**	(Italy) Pesto	2-**3**
(South Korea) FE vs **(Japan) Haruto**	(Japan) Haruto	**(Japan) Haruto**	**(Japan) Haruto**	**(Japan) Haruto**	(South Korea) FE	1-**4**
(Japan) Shigekix vs **(Japan) Issin**	(Japan) Issin	**(Japan) Issin**	**(Japan) Issin**	**(Japan) Issin**	**(Japan) Issin**	0-**5**
(Venezuela) Mighty Jake vs **(Japan) Haruto**	(Japan) Haruto	**(Japan) Haruto**	**(Japan) Haruto**	**(Japan) Haruto**	**(Japan) Haruto**	0-**5**
**(Japan) Issin** vs (Japan) Haruto	(Japan) Issin	(Japan) Haruto	**(Japan) Issin**	**(Japan) Issin**	(Japan) Haruto	**3**-2

B-girl World Final

Location: Tokyo, Japan

Round of 16
**(Japan) Riko**^{1}	**5**
(Mexico) Swami^{2}	0
(Ecuador) Leona^{1}	0
(South Korea) **Starry**^{2}	**5**
(Poland) Julianna^{1}	0
(France) **Syssy**^{3}^{2}	**5**
(South Korea) Freshbella^{3}^{2}	0
(Turkey) **Jazzy**^{3}^{1}	**5**
(United Kingdom) **Stefani**^{1}	**3**
(Japan) Ayu^{2}	2
(Kazakhstan) Sayora^{1}	0
(United States) **Logistx**^{3}^{2}	**5**
**(Lithuania) Nicka**^{2}	**5**
(Romania) Carla^{1}	0
(Bulgaria) Firebird^{1}	1
(France) **Kimie**^{2}	**4**

Quarter-finals
(Japan) **Riko**^{2}	**5**
(South Korea) Starry^{1}	0
(France) **Syssy**^{3}^{2}	**5**
(Turkey) Jazzy^{3}^{1}	0
(United Kingdom) Stefani^{1}	1
(United States) **Logistx**^{3}^{2}	**4**
(Lithuania) **Nicka**^{1}	**3**
(France) Kimie^{2}	2

Semi-finals
(Japan) **Riko**^{1}	**5**
(France) Syssy^{3}^{2}	0
(United States) Logistx^{3}^{1}	0
(Lithuania) **Nicka**^{2}	**5**

Final
(Japan) **Riko**^{2}	**4**
(Lithuania) Nicka^{1}	1
Third place

3.Qualified via Last Chance Cypher

- ^{1} means they went first in the battle, ^{2} means they went second in the battle

Judge Votes
Battle	(United States) Ronnie Ruen	(Finland) Ata	(Colombia) Luma	(South Korea) Kill	(United States) Cloud	Total Score
(Japan) **Riko** vs (Mexico) Swami	(Japan) **Riko**	(Japan) **Riko**	(Japan) **Riko**	(Japan) **Riko**	(Japan) **Riko**	**5**-0
(Ecuador) Leona vs (South Korea) **Starry**	(South Korea) **Starry**	(South Korea) **Starry**	(South Korea) **Starry**	(South Korea) **Starry**	(South Korea) **Starry**	0-**5**
(Poland) Julianna vs (France) **Syssy**	(France) **Syssy**	(France) **Syssy**	(France) **Syssy**	(France) **Syssy**	(France) **Syssy**	0-**5**
(South Korea) Freshbella vs (Turkey) **Jazzy**	(Turkey) **Jazzy**	(Turkey) **Jazzy**	(Turkey) **Jazzy**	(Turkey) **Jazzy**	(Turkey) **Jazzy**	0-**5**
(United Kingdom) **Stefani** vs (Japan) Ayu	(United Kingdom) **Stefani**	(United Kingdom) **Stefani**	(Japan) Ayu	(United Kingdom) **Stefani**	(Japan) Ayu	**3**-2
(Kazakhstan) Sayora vs **(United States) Logistx**	**(United States) Logistx**	**(United States) Logistx**	**(United States) Logistx**	**(United States) Logistx**	**(United States) Logistx**	0-**5**
**(Lithuania) Nicka** vs **(Romania)** Carla	**(Lithuania) Nicka**	**(Lithuania) Nicka**	**(Lithuania) Nicka**	**(Lithuania) Nicka**	**(Lithuania) Nicka**	**5**-0
**(Bulgaria)** Firebird vs **(France) Kimie**	**(France) Kimie**	**(France) Kimie**	**(France) Kimie**	**(Bulgaria)** Firebird	**(France) Kimie**	1-**4**
(Japan) **Riko** vs (South Korea) Starry	(Japan) **Riko**	(Japan) **Riko**	(Japan) **Riko**	(Japan) **Riko**	(Japan) **Riko**	**5**-0
(France) **Syssy** vs (Turkey) Jazzy	(France) **Syssy**	(France) **Syssy**	(France) **Syssy**	(France) **Syssy**	(France) **Syssy**	**5**-0
(United Kingdom) Stefani vs **(United States) Logistx**	**(United States) Logistx**	**(United States) Logistx**	(United Kingdom) Stefani	**(United States) Logistx**	**(United States) Logistx**	1-**4**
**(Lithuania) Nicka** vs (France) Kimie	**(Lithuania) Nicka**	(France) Kimie	**(Lithuania) Nicka**	**(Lithuania) Nicka**	(France) Kimie	**3**-2
(Japan) **Riko** vs (France) Syssy	(Japan) **Riko**	(Japan) **Riko**	(Japan) **Riko**	(Japan) **Riko**	(Japan) **Riko**	**5**-0
(United States) Logistx vs **(Lithuania) Nicka**	**(Lithuania) Nicka**	**(Lithuania) Nicka**	**(Lithuania) Nicka**	**(Lithuania) Nicka**	**(Lithuania) Nicka**	0-**5**
(Japan) **Riko** vs (Lithuania) Nicka	(Lithuania) Nicka	(Japan) **Riko**	(Japan) **Riko**	(Japan) **Riko**	(Japan) **Riko**	**4**-1

=== 2024 ===
The Red Bull BC One took place in Rio de Janeiro on 7 December, 2024.

Judges:

- (Kazakhstan) Amir (Predatorz)
- (Japan) Narumi (Body Carnival)
- (United States) Jeromeskee (Massive Monkees)
- (United Kingdom) Roxy (Soul Mavericks)
- (Venezuela) Lil G (Red Bull BC One All Stars / Team Vinotinto)

MC:

- (Switzerland) Amjad ($7 Crew)
- (Brazil) Magá Moura

DJ:

- (Netherlands) DJ Nobunaga

==== B-boy World Final ====
Location: Rio de Janeiro, Brazil

Round of 16
(Japan) Hiro 10^{2}	1
(Brazil) **Samuka**^{1}	**4**
(Taiwan) Quake^{2}	1
(South Korea) **Zooty Zoot**^{1}	**4**
(Japan) Nori^{3}^{1}	2
(Netherlands) **Menno**^{2}	**3**
(Kazakhstan) Dias^{2}	2
(United States) **Victor**^{1}	**3**
(Brazil) Leony^{1}	0
(France) **Khalil**^{2}	**5**
(Kazakhstan) Kalmius^{3}^{1}	0
(United States) **Icey Ives**^{3}^{2}	**5**
(Belgium) **Robb**^{2}	**4**
(Egypt) Klash^{1}	1
(Bulgaria) Slav^{3}^{1}	1
(Venezuela) **Alvin**^{2}	**4**

Quarter-finals
(Brazil) **Samuka**^{1}	**4**
(South Korea) Zooty Zoot^{2}	1
(Netherlands) **Menno**^{2}	**5**
(United States) Victor^{1}	0
(France) Khalil^{2}	0
(United States) **Icey Ives**^{3}^{1}	**5**
(Belgium) Robb^{2}	2
(Venezuela) **Alvin**^{1}	**3**

Semi-finals
(Brazil) Samuka^{1}	2
(Netherlands) **Menno**^{2}	**3**
(United States) **Icey Ives**^{3}^{1}	**3**
(Venezuela) Alvin^{2}	2

Final
(Netherlands) **Menno**^{1}	**4**
(United States) Icey Ives^{3}^{2}	1
Third place

3.Qualified via Last Chance Cypher
- ^{1} means they went first in the battle, ^{2} means they went second in the battle

Judge Votes
Match	Amir	Narumi	Jeromeskee	Roxy	Lil G
(Japan) Hiro 10 vs **(Brazil) Samuka**	**(Brazil) Samuka**	(Japan) Hiro 10	**(Brazil) Samuka**	**(Brazil) Samuka**	**(Brazil) Samuka**
(Taiwan) Quake vs **(South Korea) Zooty Zoot**	**(South Korea) Zooty Zoot**	**(South Korea) Zooty Zoot**	**(South Korea) Zooty Zoot**	**(South Korea) Zooty Zoot**	(Taiwan) Quake
**(Japan)** Nori vs **(Netherlands) Menno**	**(Japan)** Nori	**(Netherlands) Menno**	**(Netherlands) Menno**	**(Netherlands) Menno**	**(Japan)** Nori
**(Kazakhstan)** Dias vs **(United States) Victor**	**(Kazakhstan)** Dias	**(United States) Victor**	**(United States) Victor**	**(United States) Victor**	**(Kazakhstan)** Dias
(Brazil) Leony vs **(France) Khalil**	**(France) Khalil**	**(France) Khalil**	**(France) Khalil**	**(France) Khalil**	**(France) Khalil**
(Kazakhstan) Kalmius vs **(United States) Icey Ives**	**(United States) Icey Ives**	**(United States) Icey Ives**	**(United States) Icey Ives**	**(United States) Icey Ives**	**(United States) Icey Ives**
**(Belgium) Robb** vs (Egypt) Klash	**(Belgium) Robb**	**(Belgium) Robb**	(Egypt) Klash	**(Belgium) Robb**	**(Belgium) Robb**
(Bulgaria) Slav vs **(Venezuela) Alvin**	(Bulgaria) Slav	**(Venezuela) Alvin**	**(Venezuela) Alvin**	**(Venezuela) Alvin**	**(Venezuela) Alvin**
**(Brazil) Samuka** vs (South Korea) Zooty Zoot	**(Brazil) Samuka**	(South Korea) Zooty Zoot	**(Brazil) Samuka**	**(Brazil) Samuka**	**(Brazil) Samuka**
**(Netherlands) Menno** vs (United States) Victor	**(Netherlands) Menno**	**(Netherlands) Menno**	**(Netherlands) Menno**	**(Netherlands) Menno**	**(Netherlands) Menno**
(France) Khalil vs **(United States) Icey Ives**	**(United States) Icey Ives**	**(United States) Icey Ives**	**(United States) Icey Ives**	**(United States) Icey Ives**	**(United States) Icey Ives**
(Belgium) Robb vs **(Venezuela) Alvin**	(Belgium) Robb	(Belgium) Robb	**(Venezuela) Alvin**	**(Venezuela) Alvin**	**(Venezuela) Alvin**
(Brazil) Samuka vs **(Netherlands) Menno**	**(Netherlands) Menno**	**(Netherlands) Menno**	(Brazil) Samuka	**(Netherlands) Menno**	(Brazil) Samuka
**(United States) Icey Ives** vs (Venezuela) Alvin	**(United States) Icey Ives**	**(United States) Icey Ives**	**(United States) Icey Ives**	(Venezuela) Alvin	(Venezuela) Alvin
**(Netherlands) Menno** vs (United States) Icey Ives	**(Netherlands) Menno**	**(Netherlands) Menno**	(United States) Icey Ives	**(Netherlands) Menno**	**(Netherlands) Menno**

==== B-Girl World Final ====
Location: Rio de Janeiro, Brazil

Round of 16
(Japan) **Yasmin**^{1}	**5**
(China) Royal^{2}	0
(France) Syssy^{2}	2
(Lithuania) **Nicka**^{1}	**3**
(Ukraine) Kate^{1}	2
(Brazil) **Toquinha**^{2}	**3**
(China) **Yingzi**^{1}	**5**
(Spain) Lola^{2}	0
(Netherlands) **India**^{1}	**5**
(South Korea) Starry^{3}^{2}	0
(United States) **Logistx**^{2}	**3**
(Colombia) Luma^{1}	2
(Brazil) **Mini Japa**^{2}	**4**
(Mexico) Swami^{3}^{1}	1
(France) **Kimie**^{3}^{1}	**3**
(Japan) Mimz^{3}^{2}	2

Quarter-finals
(Japan) Yasmin^{1}	1
(Lithuania) **Nicka**^{2}	**4**
(Brazil) **Toquinha**^{2}	**4**
(China) Yingzi^{1}	1
(Netherlands) **India**^{2}	**5**
(United States) Logistx^{1}	0
(Brazil) Mini Japa^{2}	0
(France) **Kimie**^{3}^{1}	**5**

Semi-finals
(Lithuania) **Nicka**^{1}	**5**
(Brazil) Toquinha^{2}	0
(Netherlands) **India**^{1}	**4**
(France) Kimie^{3}^{2}	1

Final
(Lithuania) Nicka^{1}	2
(Netherlands) **India**^{2}	**3**
Third place

3.Qualified via Last Chance Cypher
- ^{1} means they went first in the battle, ^{2} means they went second in the battle

Judge Votes
Match	Amir	Narumi	Jeromeskee	Roxy	Lil G
(Japan) **Yasmin** vs (China) Royal	(Japan) **Yasmin**	(Japan) **Yasmin**	(Japan) **Yasmin**	(Japan) **Yasmin**	(Japan) **Yasmin**
(France) Syssy vs **(Lithuania) Nicka**	(France) Syssy	**(Lithuania) Nicka**	**(Lithuania) Nicka**	(France) Syssy	**(Lithuania) Nicka**
**(Ukraine)** Kate vs **(Brazil) Toquinha**	**(Brazil) Toquinha**	**(Ukraine)** Kate	**(Ukraine)** Kate	**(Brazil) Toquinha**	**(Brazil) Toquinha**
**(China) Yingzi** vs (Spain) Lola	**(China) Yingzi**	**(China) Yingzi**	**(China) Yingzi**	**(China) Yingzi**	**(China) Yingzi**
**(Netherlands) India** vs (South Korea) Starry	**(Netherlands) India**	**(Netherlands) India**	**(Netherlands) India**	**(Netherlands) India**	**(Netherlands) India**
**(United States) Logistx** vs (Colombia) Luma	(Colombia) Luma	**(United States) Logistx**	**(United States) Logistx**	(Colombia) Luma	**(United States) Logistx**
**(Brazil) Mini Japa** vs **(Mexico)** Swami	**(Brazil) Mini Japa**	**(Brazil) Mini Japa**	**(Brazil) Mini Japa**	**(Mexico)** Swami	**(Brazil) Mini Japa**
**(France) Kimie** vs **(Japan)** Mimz	**(France) Kimie**	**(Japan)** Mimz	**(France) Kimie**	**(Japan)** Mimz	**(France) Kimie**
(Japan) Yasmin vs **(Lithuania) Nicka**	**(Lithuania) Nicka**	**(Lithuania) Nicka**	(Japan) Yasmin	**(Lithuania) Nicka**	**(Lithuania) Nicka**
**(Brazil) Toquinha** vs (China) Yingzi	**(Brazil) Toquinha**	**(Brazil) Toquinha**	(China) Yingzi	**(Brazil) Toquinha**	**(Brazil) Toquinha**
**(Netherlands) India** vs (United States) Logistx	**(Netherlands) India**	**(Netherlands) India**	**(Netherlands) India**	**(Netherlands) India**	**(Netherlands) India**
(Brazil) Mini Japa vs **(France) Kimie**	**(France) Kimie**	**(France) Kimie**	**(France) Kimie**	**(France) Kimie**	**(France) Kimie**
**(Lithuania) Nicka** vs (Brazil) Toquinha	**(Lithuania) Nicka**	**(Lithuania) Nicka**	**(Lithuania) Nicka**	**(Lithuania) Nicka**	**(Lithuania) Nicka**
**(Netherlands) India** vs (France) Kimie	**(Netherlands) India**	(France) Kimie	**(Netherlands) India**	**(Netherlands) India**	**(Netherlands) India**
**(Netherlands) India** vs (Lithuania) Nicka	**(Netherlands) India**	**(Netherlands) India**	**(Netherlands) India**	(Lithuania) Nicka	(Lithuania) Nicka

=== 2023 ===
The Red Bull BC One took place in Paris at the Roland-Garros on October 21, 2023.

Judges:

- (United States) Flea Rock (The Street Masters / Skill Methods)
- (Spain) Movie One (Natural Moves)
- (Mexico) Dr. Hill (Unik Breakers)
- (France) Babyson (Wanted Posse)
- (South Korea) Kill (Gamblerz / C.A.Y. Crew)

MC:

- (Switzerland) Amjad ($7 Crew)
- (United States) MyVerse

DJ:

- (France) DJ One Up

==== B-boy World Final ====
Location: Paris, France

Round of 16
(Netherlands) Kid Colombia^{3}^{2}	0
(Mexico) **Kastrito**^{1}	**5**
(Canada) **Phil Wizard**^{2}	**4**
(Italy) Amaro^{3}^{1}	1
(France) **Khalil**^{3}^{1}	**3**
(United States) Jeffro^{2}	2
(Japan) **Issin**^{1}	**5**
(Belgium) Tiro^{2}	0
(South Korea) **Hong 10**^{1}	**5**
(Malaysia) Lego Sam^{2}	0
(United Kingdom) **Kid Karam**^{2}	**5**
(Brazil) Allef^{1}	0
(Poland) Wigor^{1}	0
(France) **Dany Dann**^{2}	**5**
(Venezuela) **Mighty Jake**^{3}^{2}	**5**
(China) X-Rain^{1}	0

Quarter-finals
(Mexico) Kastrito^{2}	0
(Canada) **Phil Wizard**^{1}	**5**
(France) Khalil^{3}^{2}	0
(Japan) **Issin**^{1}	**5**
(South Korea) **Hong 10**^{1}	**3**
(United Kingdom) Kid Karam^{2}	2
(France) **Dany Dann**^{1}	**3**
(Venezuela) Mighty Jake^{3}^{2}	2

Semi-finals
(Canada) **Phil Wizard**^{2}	**4**
(Japan) Issin^{1}	1
(South Korea) **Hong 10**^{2}	**4**
(France) Dany Dann^{1}	1

Final
(Canada) Phil Wizard^{1}	0
(South Korea) **Hong 10**^{2}	**5**
Third place

3.Qualified via Last Chance Cypher
- ^{1} means they went first in the battle, ^{2} means they went second in the battle

Judge Votes
Match	Dr. Hill	Movie One	Flea Rock	Babyson	Kill
(Netherlands) Kid Colombia vs **(Mexico) Kastrito**	**(Mexico) Kastrito**	**(Mexico) Kastrito**	**(Mexico) Kastrito**	**(Mexico) Kastrito**	**(Mexico) Kastrito**
**(Canada) Phil Wizard** vs **(Italy)** Amaro	**(Canada) Phil Wizard**	**(Italy)** Amaro	**(Canada) Phil Wizard**	**(Canada) Phil Wizard**	**(Canada) Phil Wizard**
**(France) Khalil** vs **(United States)** Jeffro	**(France) Khalil**	**(United States)** Jeffro	**(United States)** Jeffro	**(France) Khalil**	**(France) Khalil**
**(Japan) Issin** vs **(Belgium)** Tiro	**(Japan) Issin**	**(Japan) Issin**	**(Japan) Issin**	**(Japan) Issin**	**(Japan) Issin**
**(South Korea) Hong 10** vs (Malaysia) Legosam	**(South Korea) Hong 10**	**(South Korea) Hong 10**	**(South Korea) Hong 10**	**(South Korea) Hong 10**	**(South Korea) Hong 10**
**(United Kingdom) Kid Karam** vs (Brazil) Allef	**(United Kingdom) Kid Karam**	**(United Kingdom) Kid Karam**	**(United Kingdom) Kid Karam**	**(United Kingdom) Kid Karam**	**(United Kingdom) Kid Karam**
**(Poland)** Wigor vs **(France)** **Dany Dann**	**(France)** **Dany Dann**	**(France)** **Dany Dann**	**(France)** **Dany Dann**	**(France)** **Dany Dann**	**(France)** **Dany Dann**
**(Venezuela) Mighty Jake** vs **(China)** X-Rain	**(Venezuela) Mighty Jake**	**(Venezuela) Mighty Jake**	**(Venezuela) Mighty Jake**	**(Venezuela) Mighty Jake**	**(Venezuela) Mighty Jake**
(Mexico) Kastrito vs **(Canada) Phil Wizard**	**(Canada) Phil Wizard**	**(Canada) Phil Wizard**	**(Canada) Phil Wizard**	**(Canada) Phil Wizard**	**(Canada) Phil Wizard**
(France) Khalil vs **(Japan) Issin**	**(Japan) Issin**	**(Japan) Issin**	**(Japan) Issin**	**(Japan) Issin**	**(Japan) Issin**
**(South Korea) Hong 10** vs (United Kingdom) Kid Karam	**(South Korea) Hong 10**	(United Kingdom) Kid Karam	(United Kingdom) Kid Karam	**(South Korea) Hong 10**	**(South Korea) Hong 10**
**(France)** **Dany Dann** vs **(Venezuela)** Mighty Jake	**(France)** **Dany Dann**	**(Venezuela)** Mighty Jake	**(France)** **Dany Dann**	**(France)** **Dany Dann**	**(Venezuela)** Mighty Jake
**(Canada) Phil Wizard** vs (Japan) Issin	**(Canada) Phil Wizard**	(Japan) Issin	**(Canada) Phil Wizard**	**(Canada) Phil Wizard**	**(Canada) Phil Wizard**
**(South Korea) Hong 10** vs (France) Dany Dann	**(South Korea) Hong 10**	(France) Dany Dann	**(South Korea) Hong 10**	**(South Korea) Hong 10**	**(South Korea) Hong 10**
(Canada) Phil Wizard vs **(South Korea) Hong 10**	**(South Korea) Hong 10**	**(South Korea) Hong 10**	**(South Korea) Hong 10**	**(South Korea) Hong 10**	**(South Korea) Hong 10**

==== B-Girl World Final ====
Location: Paris, France

Round of 16
(France) **Syssy**^{1}	**4**
(Belarus) Kotya^{2}	1
(Bulgaria) Firebird^{2}	0
(China) **671**^{1}	**5**
(Japan) **Yasmin**^{3}^{1}	**4**
(Brazil) Maia^{2}	1
(Portugal) Vanessa^{1}	0
(Lithuania) **Nicka**^{2}	**5**
(Netherlands) **India**^{1}	**5**
(South Korea) Mono^{2}	0
(United Kingdom) **Stefani**^{3}^{2}	**5**
(Vietnam) Shun^{1}	0
(Brazil) Toquinha^{3}^{2}	0
(Japan) **Ami**^{1}	**5**
(France) Kimie^{3}^{2}	0
(Japan) **Riko**^{1}	**5**

Quarter-finals
(France) Syssy^{2}	2
(China) **671**^{1}	**3**
(Japan) Yasmin^{3}^{1}	0
(Lithuania) **Nicka**^{2}	**5**
(Netherlands) **India**^{1}	**5**
(United Kingdom) Stefani^{3}^{2}	0
(Japan) **Ami**^{2}	**4**
(Japan) Riko^{1}	1

Semi-finals
(China) **671**^{2}	**4**
(Lithuania) Nicka^{1}	1
(Netherlands) India^{1}	2
(Japan) **Ami**^{2}	**3**

Final
(China) 671^{2}	1
(Japan) **Ami**^{1}	**4**
Third place

1.Qualified via Last Chance Cypher
- ^{1} means they went first in the battle, ^{2} means they went second in the battle

Judge Votes
Match	Dr. Hill	Movie One	Flea Rock	Babyson	Kill
**(France)** **Syssy** vs (Belarus) Kotya	**(France)** **Syssy**	(Belarus) Kotya	**(France)** **Syssy**	**(France)** **Syssy**	**(France)** **Syssy**
**(Bulgaria)** Firebird vs **(China)** **671**	**(China)** **671**	**(China)** **671**	**(China)** **671**	**(China)** **671**	**(China)** **671**
**(Japan) Yasmin** vs **(Brazil)** Maia	**(Japan) Yasmin**	**(Japan) Yasmin**	**(Brazil)** Maia	**(Japan) Yasmin**	**(Japan) Yasmin**
(Portugal) Vanessa vs **(Lithuania) Nicka**	**(Lithuania) Nicka**	**(Lithuania) Nicka**	**(Lithuania) Nicka**	**(Lithuania) Nicka**	**(Lithuania) Nicka**
**(Netherlands) India** vs **(South Korea)** Mono	**(Netherlands) India**	**(Netherlands) India**	**(Netherlands) India**	**(Netherlands) India**	**(Netherlands) India**
**(United Kingdom) Stefani** vs **(Vietnam)** Shun	**(United Kingdom) Stefani**	**(United Kingdom) Stefani**	**(United Kingdom) Stefani**	**(United Kingdom) Stefani**	**(United Kingdom) Stefani**
**(Japan) Ami** vs **(Brazil)** Toquinha	**(Japan) Ami**	**(Japan) Ami**	**(Japan) Ami**	**(Japan) Ami**	**(Japan) Ami**
**(France)** Kimie vs **(Japan) Riko**	**(Japan) Riko**	**(Japan) Riko**	**(Japan) Riko**	**(Japan) Riko**	**(Japan) Riko**
(France) Syssy vs **(China)** **671**	**(China)** **671**	(France) Syssy	**(China)** **671**	(France) Syssy	**(China)** **671**
(Japan) Yasmin vs **(Lithuania) Nicka**	**(Lithuania) Nicka**	**(Lithuania) Nicka**	**(Lithuania) Nicka**	**(Lithuania) Nicka**	**(Lithuania) Nicka**
**(Netherlands) India** vs (United Kingdom) Stefani	**(Netherlands) India**	**(Netherlands) India**	**(Netherlands) India**	**(Netherlands) India**	**(Netherlands) India**
**(Japan) Ami** vs (Japan) Riko	**(Japan) Ami**	**(Japan) Ami**	**(Japan) Ami**	(Japan) Riko	**(Japan) Ami**
**(China)** **671** vs (Lithuania) Nicka	**(China)** **671**	(Lithuania) Nicka	**(China)** **671**	**(China)** **671**	**(China)** **671**
(Netherlands) India vs **(Japan) Ami**	**(Japan) Ami**	**(Japan) Ami**	(Netherlands) India	**(Japan) Ami**	(Netherlands) India
(China) 671 vs **(Japan) Ami**	**(Japan) Ami**	**(Japan) Ami**	(China) 671	**(Japan) Ami**	**(Japan) Ami**

=== 2022 ===
In 2022, the 19th Red Bull BC One took place in New York City on November 12, 2022.

Judges:

- (South Korea) Sick (Gamblerz)
- (Japan) Ayumi (Body Carnival)
- (France) Jey (Legiteam Obstruction)
- (Brazil) Fabgirl (BSB Girls)
- (United States) Kid Glyde (Dynamic Rockers)

MC:

- (United States) Wicket (Renegade Rockers)
- (United States) MyVerse

DJ:

- (United States) DJ Skeme Richards (Rock Steady Crew)

==== B-boy World final ====
Location: New York, United States

Round of 16
(Venezuela) **Alvin**^{2}	**5**
(Taiwan) Quake^{1}	0
(Japan) **Issin**^{3}^{1}	**5**
(Netherlands) Lorenzo^{2}	0
(Kazakhstan) **Amir**^{1}	**4**
(Greece) Mighty Jimm^{3}^{2}	1
(Netherlands) **Lee**^{1}	**4**
(Canada) Illz^{3}^{2}	1
(Morocco) **Lil Zoo**^{3}^{2}	**5**
(India) Wildchild^{1}	0
(Poland) Wigor^{3}^{2}	1
(Japan) **Yu-Ki**^{1}	**4**
(Canada) **Phil Wizard**^{2}	**5**
(Venezuela) Mini Joe^{3}^{1}	0
(United States) **Victor**^{1}	**5**
(France) Marlone^{2}	0

Quarterfinals
(Venezuela) Alvin^{1}	0
(Japan) **Issin**^{3}^{2}	**5**
(Kazakhstan) Amir^{1}	2
(Netherlands) **Lee**^{2}	**3**
(Morocco) Lil Zoo^{1}^{2}	1
(Japan) **Yu-Ki**^{1}	**4**
(Canada) Phil Wizard^{2}	1
(United States) **Victor**^{1}	**4**

Semifinals
(Japan) Issin^{3}^{2}	1
(Netherlands) **Lee**^{1}	**4**
(Japan) Yu-Ki^{2}	0
(United States) **Victor**^{1}	**5**

Finals
(Netherlands) Lee^{2}	2
(United States) **Victor**^{1}	**3**

1.Qualified via Last Chance Cypher
- ^{1} means they went first in the battle, ^{2} means they went second in the battle

Judge Votes
Match	(South Korea) Sick	(Brazil) Fabgirl	(France) Jey	(Japan) Ayumi	(United States) Kid Glyde
**(Venezuela) Alvin** vs (Taiwan) Quake	**(Venezuela) Alvin**	**(Venezuela) Alvin**	**(Venezuela) Alvin**	**(Venezuela) Alvin**	**(Venezuela) Alvin**
(Japan) **Issin** vs (Netherlands) Lorenzo	(Japan) **Issin**	(Japan) **Issin**	(Japan) **Issin**	(Japan) **Issin**	(Japan) **Issin**
(Kazakhstan) **Amir** vs (Greece) Mighty Jimm	(Kazakhstan) **Amir**	(Greece) Mighty Jimm	(Kazakhstan) **Amir**	(Kazakhstan) **Amir**	(Kazakhstan) **Amir**
(Netherlands) **Lee** vs (Canada) Illz	(Netherlands) **Lee**	(Netherlands) **Lee**	(Canada) Illz	(Netherlands) **Lee**	(Netherlands) **Lee**
(Morocco) **Lil Zoo** vs (India) Wildchild	(Morocco) **Lil Zoo**	(Morocco) **Lil Zoo**	(Morocco) **Lil Zoo**	(Morocco) **Lil Zoo**	(Morocco) **Lil Zoo**
(Poland) Wigor vs (Japan) **Yu-Ki**	(Japan) **Yu-Ki**	(Japan) **Yu-Ki**	(Poland) Wigor	(Japan) **Yu-Ki**	(Japan) **Yu-Ki**
(Canada) **Phil Wizard** vs (Venezuela) Mini Joe	(Canada) **Phil Wizard**	(Canada) **Phil Wizard**	(Canada) **Phil Wizard**	(Canada) **Phil Wizard**	(Canada) **Phil Wizard**
(United States) **Victor** vs (France) Marlone	(United States) **Victor**	(United States) **Victor**	(United States) **Victor**	(United States) **Victor**	(United States) **Victor**
(Venezuela) Alvin vs (Japan) **Issin**	(Japan) **Issin**	(Japan) **Issin**	(Japan) **Issin**	(Japan) **Issin**	(Japan) **Issin**
(Kazakhstan) Amir vs (Netherlands) **Lee**	(Netherlands) **Lee**	(Netherlands) **Lee**	(Netherlands) **Lee**	(Kazakhstan) Amir	(Kazakhstan) Amir
(Morocco) Lil Zoo vs (Japan) **Yu-Ki**	(Morocco) Lil Zoo	(Japan) **Yu-Ki**	(Japan) **Yu-Ki**	(Japan) **Yu-Ki**	(Japan) **Yu-Ki**
(Canada) Phil Wizard vs (United States) **Victor**	(Canada) Phil Wizard	(United States) **Victor**	(United States) **Victor**	(United States) **Victor**	(United States) **Victor**
(Japan) Issin vs (Netherlands) **Lee**	(Japan) Issin	(Netherlands) **Lee**	(Netherlands) **Lee**	(Netherlands) **Lee**	(Netherlands) **Lee**
(Japan) Yu-Ki vs (United States) **Victor**	(United States) **Victor**	(United States) **Victor**	(United States) **Victor**	(United States) **Victor**	(United States) **Victor**
(Netherlands) Lee vs (United States) **Victor**	(United States) **Victor**	(Netherlands) Lee	(United States) **Victor**	(Netherlands) Lee	(United States) **Victor**

==== B-Girl World Final ====
Location: New York, United States

Round of 16
(China) **671**^{2}	**4**
(Italy) Alessandrina^{3}^{1}	1
(Ecuador) Isis^{1}	0
(Portugal) **Vanessa**^{3}^{2}	**5**
(Mexico) **Swami**^{1}	**4**
(France) Carlota^{3}^{2}	1
(Netherlands) **India**^{1}	**5**
(Colombia) Luma^{2}	0
(United States) **Sunny**^{3}^{2}	**3**
(South Korea) Fresh Bella^{1}	2
(France) **Kimie**^{1}	**3**
(Poland) Paulina^{3}^{2}	2
(Japan) Yuika^{1}	2
(Italy) **Anti**^{2}	**3**
(United States) **Logistx**^{1}	**5**
(Canada) Emma^{2}	0

Quarterfinals
(China) **671**^{1}	**5**
(Portugal) Vanessa^{3}^{2}	0
(Mexico) Swami^{1}	0
(Netherlands) **India**^{2}	**5**
(United States) **Sunny**^{3}^{2}	**5**
(France) Kimie^{1}	0
(Italy) Anti^{2}	2
(United States) **Logistx**^{1}	**3**

Semifinals
(China) 671^{2}	1
(Netherlands) **India**^{1}	**4**
(United States) Sunny^{3}^{2}	2
(United States) **Logistx**^{1}	**3**

Finals
(Netherlands) **India**^{2}	**3**
(United States) Logistx^{1}	2

1.Qualified via Last Chance Cypher
- ^{1} means they went first in the battle, ^{2} means they went second in the battle

Judge Votes
Match	(South Korea) Sick	(Brazil) Fabgirl	(France) Jey	(Japan) Ayumi	(United States) Kid Glyde
(China) **671** vs (Italy) Alessandrina	(China) **671**	(Italy) Alessandrina	(China) **671**	(China) **671**	(China) **671**
(Ecuador) Isis vs (Portugal) **Vanessa**	(Portugal) **Vanessa**	(Portugal) **Vanessa**	(Portugal) **Vanessa**	(Portugal) **Vanessa**	(Portugal) **Vanessa**
(Mexico) **Swami** vs (France) Carlota	(Mexico) **Swami**	(France) Carlota	(Mexico) **Swami**	(Mexico) **Swami**	(Mexico) **Swami**
(Netherlands) **India** vs (Colombia) Luma	(Netherlands) **India**	(Netherlands) **India**	(Netherlands) **India**	(Netherlands) **India**	(Netherlands) **India**
(United States) **Sunny** vs (South Korea) Fresh Bella	(United States) **Sunny**	(South Korea) Fresh Bella	(United States) **Sunny**	(South Korea) Fresh Bella	(United States) **Sunny**
(France) **Kimie** vs (Poland) Paulina	(Poland) Paulina	(France) **Kimie**	(France) **Kimie**	(Poland) Paulina	(France) **Kimie**
(Japan) Yuika vs (Italy) **Anti**	(Italy) **Anti**	(Japan) Yuika	(Japan) Yuika	(Italy) **Anti**	(Italy) **Anti**
(United States) **Logistx** vs (Canada) Emma	(United States) **Logistx**	(United States) **Logistx**	(United States) **Logistx**	(United States) **Logistx**	(United States) **Logistx**
(China) **671** vs (Portugal) Vanessa	(China) **671**	(China) **671**	(China) **671**	(China) **671**	(China) **671**
(Mexico) Swami vs (Netherlands) **India**	(Netherlands) **India**	(Netherlands) **India**	(Netherlands) **India**	(Netherlands) **India**	(Netherlands) **India**
(United States) **Sunny** vs (France) Kimie	(United States) **Sunny**	(United States) **Sunny**	(United States) **Sunny**	(United States) **Sunny**	(United States) **Sunny**
(Italy) Anti vs (United States) **Logistx**	(Italy) Anti	(Italy) Anti	(United States) **Logistx**	(United States) **Logistx**	(United States) **Logistx**
(China) 671 vs (Netherlands) **India**	(Netherlands) **India**	(China) 671	(Netherlands) **India**	(Netherlands) **India**	(Netherlands) **India**
(United States) Sunny vs (United States) **Logistx**	(United States) **Logistx**	(United States) Sunny	(United States) **Logistx**	(United States) Sunny	(United States) **Logistx**
(Netherlands) **India** vs (United States) Logistx	(United States) Logistx	(Netherlands) **India**	(Netherlands) **India**	(Netherlands) **India**	(United States) Logistx

=== 2021 ===
The 18th edition of the breaking competition took place for the first time in Gdańsk, Poland, on November 5 and 6.

Judges:

- (Netherlands) Menno (Hustle Kidz / Deaf Dogs)
- (France) Sarah Bee (Zamounda)
- (Poland) Kleju (Polskee Flavour / Funky Masons)
- (United States) Beta (Ground Zero Crew / Heartbreakerz / MF Kidz)
- (United States) El Niño (Floorlords / Flava Squad / Squadron / Boogie Brats)

MC:

- (Switzerland) Amjad ($7 Crew)

DJ:

- (Poland) DJ Plash One (Dons Crew)

==== B-boy World Final ====
Location: Gdańsk, Poland

Round of 16
(Netherlands) **Tawfiq**^{1}	**3**
(Russia) Gun^{2}	2
(Spain) Xak^{1}	1
(Netherlands) **Lee**^{3}^{2}	**4**
(France) Lagaet^{2}	2
(Brazil) **Bart**^{1}	**3**
(Canada) **Phil Wizard**^{1}	**5**
(Japan) Nori^{3}^{2}	0
(Denmark) **Zoopreme**^{1}	**3**
(Belarus) Wild Jerry^{2}	2
(United Kingdom) Sunni^{2}	0
(Kazakhstan) **Amir**^{3}^{1}	**5**
(United States) **Flea Rock**^{1}	**5**
(Poland) Thomaz^{2}	0
(Japan) **Shigekix**^{2}	**5**
(Spain) Johnny Fox^{3}^{1}	0

Quarterfinals
(Netherlands) Tawfiq^{1}	0
(Netherlands) **Lee**^{3}^{2}	**5**
(Brazil) Bart^{2}	0
(Canada) **Phil Wizard**^{1}	**5**
(Denmark) Zoopreme^{2}	0
(Kazakhstan) **Amir**^{3}^{1}	**5**
(United States) **Flea Rock**^{2}	**4**
(Japan) Shigekix^{1}	1

Semifinals
(Netherlands) Lee^{3}^{1}	1
(Canada) **Phil Wizard**^{2}	**4**
(Kazakhstan) **Amir**^{3}^{1}	**5**
(United States) Flea Rock^{2}	0

Finals
(Canada) Phil Wizard^{2}	2
(Kazakhstan) **Amir**^{3}^{1}	**3**

3.Qualified via Last Chance Cypher
- ^{1} means they went first in the battle, ^{2} means they went second in the battle

Judge Votes
Match	(Poland) Kleju	(France) Sarah Bee	(Netherlands) Menno	(United States) Beta	(United States) El Niño
(Netherlands) **Tawfiq** vs (Russia) Gun	(Russia) Gun	(Netherlands) **Tawfiq**	(Netherlands) **Tawfiq**	(Netherlands) **Tawfiq**	(Russia) Gun
(Spain) Xak vs (Netherlands) **Lee**	(Netherlands) **Lee**	(Netherlands) **Lee**	(Netherlands) **Lee**	(Spain) Xak	(Netherlands) **Lee**
(France) Lagaet vs (Brazil) **Bart**	(France) Lagaet	(France) Lagaet	(Brazil) **Bart**	(Brazil) **Bart**	(Brazil) **Bart**
(Canada) **Phil Wizard** vs (Japan) Nori	(Canada) **Phil Wizard**	(Canada) **Phil Wizard**	(Canada) **Phil Wizard**	(Canada) **Phil Wizard**	(Canada) **Phil Wizard**
(Denmark) **Zoopreme** vs (Belarus) Wild Jerry	(Denmark) **Zoopreme**	(Denmark) **Zoopreme**	(Denmark) **Zoopreme**	(Belarus) Wild Jerry	(Belarus) Wild Jerry
(United Kingdom) Sunni vs (Kazakhstan) **Amir**	(Kazakhstan) **Amir**	(Kazakhstan) **Amir**	(Kazakhstan) **Amir**	(Kazakhstan) **Amir**	(Kazakhstan) **Amir**
(United States) **Flea Rock** vs (Poland) Thomaz	(United States) **Flea Rock**	(United States) **Flea Rock**	(United States) **Flea Rock**	(United States) **Flea Rock**	(United States) **Flea Rock**
(Japan) **Shigekix** vs (Spain) Johnny Fox	(Japan) **Shigekix**	(Japan) **Shigekix**	(Japan) **Shigekix**	(Japan) **Shigekix**	(Japan) **Shigekix**
(Netherlands) Tawfiq vs (Netherlands) **Lee**	(Netherlands) **Lee**	(Netherlands) **Lee**	(Netherlands) **Lee**	(Netherlands) **Lee**	(Netherlands) **Lee**
(Brazil) Bart vs (Canada) **Phil Wizard**	(Canada) **Phil Wizard**	(Canada) **Phil Wizard**	(Canada) **Phil Wizard**	(Canada) **Phil Wizard**	(Canada) **Phil Wizard**
(Denmark) Zoopreme vs (Kazakhstan) **Amir**	(Kazakhstan) **Amir**	(Kazakhstan) **Amir**	(Kazakhstan) **Amir**	(Kazakhstan) **Amir**	(Kazakhstan) **Amir**
(United States) **Flea Rock** vs (Japan) Shigekix	(United States) **Flea Rock**	(United States) **Flea Rock**	(United States) **Flea Rock**	(United States) **Flea Rock**	(Japan) Shigekix
(Netherlands) Lee vs **(Canada) Phil Wizard**	**(Canada) Phil Wizard**	(Netherlands) Lee	**(Canada) Phil Wizard**	**(Canada) Phil Wizard**	**(Canada) Phil Wizard**
(Kazakhstan) **Amir** vs (United States) Flea Rock	(Kazakhstan) **Amir**	(Kazakhstan) **Amir**	(Kazakhstan) **Amir**	(Kazakhstan) **Amir**	(Kazakhstan) **Amir**
(Canada) Phil Wizard vs (Kazakhstan) **Amir**	(Kazakhstan) **Amir**	(Kazakhstan) **Amir**	(Kazakhstan) **Amir**	(Canada) Phil Wizard	(Canada) Phil Wizard

==== B-Girl World Final ====
Location: Gdańsk, Poland

Round of 16
(United States) **Logistx**^{1}	**5**
(South Korea) Yell^{2}	0
(France) San Andrea^{1}	0
(Japan) **Ayumi**^{3}^{2}	**5**
(Japan) Ami^{2}	0
(Russia) **Nadia**^{1}	**5**
(Greece) **Sidi**^{1}	**3**
(France) Fanny^{3}^{2}	2
(Russia) **Kastet**^{2}	**5**
(Argentina) Carito^{1}	0
(Japan) **Ram**^{2}	**4**
(United Kingdom) Stefani^{3}^{1}	1
(Poland) **Paulina**^{1}	**3**
(Colombia) Luma^{2}	2
(Belgium) Madmax^{1}	0
(Russia) **Vavi**^{3}^{2}	**5**

Quarterfinals
(United States) **Logistx**^{1}	**4**
(Japan) Ayumi^{3}^{2}	1
(Russia) **Nadia**^{1}	**5**
(Greece) Sidi^{2}	0
(Russia) **Kastet**^{1}	**5**
(Japan) Ram^{2}	0
(Poland) Paulina^{2}	2
(Russia) **Vavi**^{3}^{1}	**3**

Semifinals
(United States) **Logistx**^{2}	**5**
(Russia) Nadia^{1}	0
(Russia) Kastet^{1}	2
(Russia) **Vavi**^{3}^{2}	**3**

Finals
(United States) **Logistx**^{1}	**5**
(Russia) Vavi^{3}^{2}	0

1.Qualified via Last Chance Cypher

- ^{1} means they went first in the battle, ^{2} means they went second in the battle

Judge Votes
Match	(Poland) Kleju	(France) Sarah Bee	(Netherlands) Menno	(United States) Beta	(United States) El Niño
(United States) **Logistx** vs (South Korea) Yell	(United States) **Logistx**	(United States) **Logistx**	(United States) **Logistx**	(United States) **Logistx**	(United States) **Logistx**
(France) San Andrea vs (Japan) **Ayumi**	(Japan) **Ayumi**	(Japan) **Ayumi**	(Japan) **Ayumi**	(Japan) **Ayumi**	(Japan) **Ayumi**
(Japan) Ami vs (Russia) **Nadia**	(Russia) **Nadia**	(Russia) **Nadia**	(Russia) **Nadia**	(Russia) **Nadia**	(Russia) **Nadia**
(Greece) **Sidi** vs (France) Fanny	(Greece) **Sidi**	(France) Fanny	(France) Fanny	(Greece) **Sidi**	(Greece) **Sidi**
(Russia) **Kastet** vs (Argentina) Carito	(Russia) **Kastet**	(Russia) **Kastet**	(Russia) **Kastet**	(Russia) **Kastet**	(Russia) **Kastet**
(Japan) **Ram** vs (United Kingdom) Stefani	(Japan) **Ram**	(Japan) **Ram**	(Japan) **Ram**	(United Kingdom) Stefani	(Japan) **Ram**
(Poland) **Paulina** vs (Colombia) Luma	(Poland) **Paulina**	(Poland) **Paulina**	(Poland) **Paulina**	(Colombia) Luma	(Colombia) Luma
(Belgium) Madmax vs (Russia) **Vavi**	(Russia) **Vavi**	(Russia) **Vavi**	(Russia) **Vavi**	(Russia) **Vavi**	**(Russia) Vavi**
(United States) **Logistx** vs (Japan) Ayumi	(United States) **Logistx**	(Japan) Ayumi	(United States) **Logistx**	(United States) **Logistx**	(United States) **Logistx**
(Russia) **Nadia** vs (Greece) Sidi	(Russia) **Nadia**	(Russia) **Nadia**	(Russia) **Nadia**	(Russia) **Nadia**	(Russia) **Nadia**
(Russia) **Kastet** vs (Japan) Ram	(Russia) **Kastet**	(Russia) **Kastet**	(Russia) **Kastet**	(Russia) **Kastet**	(Russia) **Kastet**
(Poland) Paulina vs (Russia) **Vavi**	(Poland) Paulina	(Russia) **Vavi**	(Russia) **Vavi**	(Russia) **Vavi**	(Poland) Paulina
(United States) **Logistx** vs (Russia) Nadia	(United States) **Logistx**	(United States) **Logistx**	(United States) **Logistx**	(United States) **Logistx**	**(United States) Logistx**
(Russia) Kastet vs (Russia) **Vavi**	(Russia) Kastet	(Russia) **Vavi**	(Russia) **Vavi**	(Russia) **Vavi**	(Russia) Kastet
(United States) **Logistx** vs **(Russia)** Vavi	(United States) **Logistx**	(United States) **Logistx**	(United States) **Logistx**	(United States) **Logistx**	(United States) **Logistx**

=== 2020 ===
The 17th edition took place in Salzburg, Austria.

Judges:

- (United States) Omar (Mighty Zulu Kingz)
- (Spain) Movie One (Natural Moves)
- (Finland) AT (Flow Mo)
- (France) Lilou (Pockemon Crew)
- (Japan) Ayumi (Body Carnival)

MC:

- (Germany) Redchild

DJ:

- (Germany) Just a Kid

==== B-boy World Final ====
Location: Salzburg, Austria

Quarter-finals
(Japan) **Shigekix**^{1}	**5**
(United Kingdom) Kid Karam^{2}	0
(Kazakhstan) Killa Kolya^{1}	2
(South Korea) **Vero**^{2}	**3**
(Morocco) **Lil Zoo**^{2}	**4**
(United States) Philip^{1}	1
(Russia) **Alkolil**^{1}	**3**
(France) Pac Pac^{2}	2

Semi-finals
(Japan) **Shigekix**^{1}	**4**
(South Korea) Vero^{2}	1
(Morocco) Lil Zoo^{2}	0
(Russia) **Alkolil**^{1}	**5**

Final
(Japan) **Shigekix**^{1}	**4**
(Russia) Alkolil^{2}	1

- ^{1} means they went first in the battle, ^{2} means they went second in the battle

Judge Votes
Match	(Spain) Movie One	(United States) Omar	(Japan) Ayumi	(France) Lilou	(Finland) AT
(Japan) **Shigekix** vs (United Kingdom) Kid Karam	(Japan) **Shigekix**	(Japan) **Shigekix**	(Japan) **Shigekix**	(Japan) **Shigekix**	(Japan) **Shigekix**
(Kazakhstan) Killa Kolya vs (South Korea) **Vero**	(South Korea) **Vero**	(Kazakhstan) Killa Kolya	(South Korea) **Vero**	(Kazakhstan) Killa Kolya	(South Korea) **Vero**
(Morocco) **Lil Zoo** vs (United States) Philip	(United States) Philip	(Morocco) **Lil Zoo**	(Morocco) **Lil Zoo**	(Morocco) **Lil Zoo**	(Morocco) **Lil Zoo**
(Russia) **Alkolil** vs (France) Pac Pac	(Russia) **Alkolil**	(Russia) **Alkolil**	(Russia) **Alkolil**	(France) Pac Pac	(France) Pac Pac
(Japan) **Shigekix** vs (South Korea) Vero	(Japan) **Shigekix**	(Japan) **Shigekix**	(South Korea) Vero	(Japan) **Shigekix**	(Japan) **Shigekix**
(Morocco) Lil Zoo vs (Russia) **Alkolil**	(Russia) **Alkolil**	(Russia) **Alkolil**	(Russia) **Alkolil**	(Russia) **Alkolil**	(Russia) **Alkolil**
(Japan) **Shigekix** vs (Russia) Alkolil	(Japan) **Shigekix**	(Japan) **Shigekix**	(Japan) **Shigekix**	(Japan) **Shigekix**	(Russia) Alkolil

==== B-Girl World Final ====
Location: Salzburg, Austria

Quarter-finals
(Belgium) **Madmax**^{1}	**3**
(United States) Sunny^{2}	2
(Germany) **Jilou**^{1}	**4**
(Austria) Sina^{2}	1
(Russia) **Kastet**^{2}	**5**
(Netherlands) Mess^{1}	0
(Japan) **Ayane**^{2}	**5**
(France) Kami^{1}	0

Semi-finals
(Belgium) **Madmax**^{1}	**4**
(Germany) Jilou^{2}	1
(Russia) **Kastet**^{2}	**3**
(Japan) Ayane^{1}	2

Final
(Belgium) Madmax^{1}	1
(Russia) **Kastet**^{2}	**4**

- ^{1} means they went first in the battle, ^{2} means they went second in the battle

Judge Votes
Match	(Spain) Movie One	(United States) Omar	(Japan) Ayumi	(France) Lilou	(Finland) AT
(Belgium) **Madmax** vs (United States) Sunny	(Belgium) **Madmax**	(Belgium) **Madmax**	(United States) Sunny	(United States) Sunny	(Belgium) **Madmax**
(Germany) **Jilou** vs (Austria) Sina	(Germany) **Jilou**	(Austria) Sina	(Germany) **Jilou**	(Germany) **Jilou**	(Germany) **Jilou**
(Russia) **Kastet** vs (Netherlands) Mess	(Russia) **Kastet**	(Russia) **Kastet**	(Russia) **Kastet**	(Russia) **Kastet**	(Russia) **Kastet**
(Japan) **Ayane** vs (France) Kami	(Japan) **Ayane**	(Japan) **Ayane**	(Japan) **Ayane**	(Japan) **Ayane**	(Japan) **Ayane**
(Belgium) **Madmax** vs (Germany) Jilou	(Belgium) **Madmax**	(Belgium) **Madmax**	(Germany) Jilou	(Belgium) **Madmax**	(Belgium) **Madmax**
(Russia) **Kastet** vs (Japan) Ayane	(Russia) **Kastet**	(Russia) **Kastet**	(Japan) Ayane	(Russia) **Kastet**	(Japan) Ayane
(Belgium) Madmax vs (Russia) **Kastet**	(Belgium) Madmax	(Russia) **Kastet**	(Russia) **Kastet**	(Russia) **Kastet**	(Russia) **Kastet**

=== 2019 ===
In its 16th edition took place on November 9, in Mumbai, India.

Judges:

- (Venezuela) Lil G (Speedy Angels / Team Vinotinto)
- (United States) Poe One (Style Elements / Mighty Zulu Kingz)
- (Japan) Narumi (Body Carnival)
- (Ukraine) Intact (Ruffneck Attack)
- (South Korea) Physicx (Rivers Crew)

MC:

- (Switzerland) Amjad ($7 Crew)

DJ:

- (Russia) DJ Smirnoff

==== B-boy World Final ====
Location: Mumbai, India

Round of 16
(Russia) **Bumblebee**^{2}	**4**
(United States) Stripes^{1}	1
(Japan) Nori^{1}	0
(Netherlands) **Menno**^{2}	**5**
(Greece) **Onel**^{2}	**5**
(South Korea) Heady^{1}	0
(Japan) **Kazuki Rock**^{2}	**5**
(Canada) Phil Wizard^{1}	0
(Russia) **Beetle**^{1}	**5**
(France) Khalil^{2}	0
(Taiwan) Monkey King^{2}	1
(Brazil) **Bart**^{1}	**4**
(Kazakhstan) **Killa Kolya**^{1}	**3**
(Morocco) Lil Zoo^{2}	2
(Ukraine) **Robin**^{1}	**5**
(India) Flying Machine^{2}	0

Quarterfinals
(Russia) Bumblebee^{2}	1
(Netherlands) **Menno**^{1}	**4**
(Greece) Onel^{2}	0
(Japan) **Kazuki Rock**^{1}	**5**
(Russia) Beetle^{1}	0
(Brazil) **Bart**^{2}	**5**
(Kazakhstan) **Killa Kolya**^{2}	**3**
(Ukraine) Robin^{1}	2

Semifinals
(Netherlands) **Menno**^{1}	**4**
(Japan) Kazuki Rock^{2}	1
(Brazil) Bart^{2}	1
(Kazakhstan) **Killa Kolya**^{1}	**4**

Finals
(Netherlands) **Menno**^{1}	**3***
(Kazakhstan) Killa Kolya^{2}	1*

Poe One didn't get to show his vote after Physicx showed his vote for Menno, which was the 3rd vote for Menno which was enough to win

- ^{1} means they went first in the battle, ^{2} means they went second in the battle

Judge Votes
Match	(Japan) Narumi	(Venezuela) Lil G	(Ukraine) Intact	(South Korea) Physicx	(United States) Poe One
(Russia) **Bumblebee** vs (United States) Stripes	(United States) Stripes	(Russia) **Bumblebee**	(Russia) **Bumblebee**	(Russia) **Bumblebee**	(Russia) **Bumblebee**
(Japan) Nori vs (Netherlands) **Menno**	(Netherlands) **Menno**	(Netherlands) **Menno**	(Netherlands) **Menno**	(Netherlands) **Menno**	(Netherlands) **Menno**
(Greece) **Onel** vs (South Korea) Heady	(Greece) **Onel**	(Greece) **Onel**	(Greece) **Onel**	(Greece) **Onel**	(Greece) **Onel**
(Japan) **Kazuki Rock** vs (Canada) Phil Wizard	(Japan) **Kazuki Rock**	(Japan) **Kazuki Rock**	(Japan) **Kazuki Rock**	(Japan) **Kazuki Rock**	(Japan) **Kazuki Rock**
(Russia) **Beetle** vs (France) Khalil	(Russia) **Beetle**	(Russia) **Beetle**	(Russia) **Beetle**	(Russia) **Beetle**	(Russia) **Beetle**
(Taiwan) Monkey King vs (Brazil) **Bart**	(Brazil) **Bart**	(Brazil) **Bart**	(Brazil) **Bart**	(Brazil) **Bart**	(Taiwan) Monkey King
(Kazakhstan) **Killa Kolya** vs (Morocco) Lil Zoo	(Kazakhstan) **Killa Kolya**	(Kazakhstan) **Killa Kolya**	(Kazakhstan) **Killa Kolya**	(Morocco) Lil Zoo	(Morocco) Lil Zoo
(Ukraine) **Robin** vs (India) Flying Machine	(Ukraine) **Robin**	(Ukraine) **Robin**	(Ukraine) **Robin**	(Ukraine) **Robin**	(Ukraine) **Robin**
(Russia) Bumblebee vs (Netherlands) **Menno**	(Netherlands) **Menno**	(Netherlands) **Menno**	(Netherlands) **Menno**	(Russia) Bumblebee	(Netherlands) **Menno**
(Greece) Onel vs (Japan) **Kazuki Rock**	(Japan) **Kazuki Rock**	(Japan) **Kazuki Rock**	(Japan) **Kazuki Rock**	(Japan) **Kazuki Rock**	(Japan) **Kazuki Rock**
(Russia) Beetle vs (Brazil) **Bart**	(Brazil) **Bart**	(Brazil) **Bart**	(Brazil) **Bart**	(Brazil) **Bart**	(Brazil) **Bart**
(Kazakhstan) **Killa Kolya** vs (Ukraine) Robin	(Ukraine) Robin	(Ukraine) Robin	(Kazakhstan) **Killa Kolya**	(Kazakhstan) **Killa Kolya**	(Kazakhstan) **Killa Kolya**
(Netherlands) **Menno** vs (Japan) Kazuki Rock	(Japan) Kazuki Rock	(Netherlands) **Menno**	(Netherlands) **Menno**	(Netherlands) **Menno**	(Netherlands) **Menno**
(Brazil) Bart vs (Kazakhstan) **Killa Kolya**	(Brazil) Bart	(Kazakhstan) **Killa Kolya**	(Kazakhstan) **Killa Kolya**	(Kazakhstan) **Killa Kolya**	(Kazakhstan) **Killa Kolya**
(Netherlands) **Menno** vs (Kazakhstan) Killa Kolya	(Netherlands) **Menno**	(Kazakhstan) Killa Kolya	(Netherlands) **Menno**	(Netherlands) **Menno**	?

==== B-Girl World Final ====
Location: Mumbai, India

Round of 16
(United States) Logistx^{1}	2
(Russia) **Kastet**^{2}	**3**
(China) Fen Qi^{1}	0
(South Korea) **Yell**^{2}	**5**
(Germany) **Jilou**^{1}	**5**
(Italy) Alessandrina^{2}	0
(France) Sarah Bee^{2}	0
(Japan) **Mimz**^{1}	**5**
(France) **San Andrea**^{1}	**5**
(Netherlands) Mess^{2}	0
(Japan) **Ayumi**^{2}	**5**
(Finland) Ramona^{1}	0
(Venezuela) **Estrella**^{1}	**3**
(Greece) Sidi^{2}	2
(Colombia) Luma^{1}	0
(Japan) **Ami**^{2}	**5**

Quarterfinals
(Russia) **Kastet**^{1}	**5**
(South Korea) Yell^{2}	0
(Germany) Jilou^{1}	1
(Japan) **Mimz**^{2}	**4**
(France) San Andrea^{2}	2
(Japan) **Ayumi**^{1}	**3**
(Venezuela) Estrella^{1}	0
(Japan) **Ami**^{2}	**5**

Semifinals
(Russia) **Kastet**^{1}	**4**
(Japan) Mimz^{2}	1
(Japan) **Ayumi**^{2}	**4**
(Japan) Ami^{1}	1

Finals
(Russia) **Kastet**^{2}	**3***
(Japan) Ayumi^{1}	1*

Narumi didn't get to show her vote after Poe One showed his vote for Kastet, which was the 3rd vote for Kastet which was enough to win

- ^{1} means they went first in the battle, ^{2} means they went second in the battle

=== 2018 ===
In 2004, the first Red Bull BC One was held at the cultural centre La Coupole in Biel. Fourteen years later, it to Switzerland. This time, at the Hallenstadion in northern Zurich.

Judges:

- (Switzerland) Tuff Kid (Basel City Attack)
- (Germany) Benny (Flying Steps)
- (United States) Wicket (Renegade Rockers)
- (France) Junior (Wanted Posse)
- (Japan) Taisuke (Flooriorz / Super Cr3w)

MC:

- (Switzerland) Amjad ($7 Crew)

DJ:

- (United States) DJ Fleg (Lionz of Zion)

==== B-boy World Final ====
Location: Zurich, Switzerland

Round of 16
(Japan) **Issei**^{1}	**5**
(Brazil) Luka^{2}	0
(Morocco) Cri6^{1}	1
(Mexico) **Dr. Hill**^{2}	**4**
(Morocco) **The Wolfer**^{2}	**3**
(Japan) Nori^{1}	2
(United Kingdom) Sunni^{1}	2
(United States) **Luigi**^{2}	**3**
(Morocco) **Lil Zoo**^{1}	**4**
(South Korea) Vero^{2}	1
(France) **Lil Kev**^{2}	**3**
(Netherlands) Kid Colombia^{1}	2
(United States) **Victor**^{1}	**5**
(Brazil) Leony^{2}	0
(Ukraine) **Uzee Rock**^{1}	**5**
(Spain) Chey^{2}	0

Quarterfinals
(Japan) Issei^{1}	2
(Mexico) **Dr. Hill**^{2}	**3**
(Morocco) The Wolfer^{2}	2
(United States) **Luigi**^{1}	**3**
(Morocco) **Lil Zoo**^{1}	**4**
(France) Lil Kev^{2}	1
(United States) **Victor**^{2}	**4**
(Ukraine) Uzee Rock^{1}	1

Semifinals
(Mexico) Dr. Hill^{1}	2
(United States) **Luigi**^{2}	**3**
(Morocco) **Lil Zoo**^{1}	**4**
(United States) Victor^{2}	1

Finals
(United States) Luigi^{1}	1*
(Morocco) **Lil Zoo**^{2}	**3***

Wicket didn't get to show his vote after Benny showed his vote for Lil Zoo, which was the 3rd vote for Lil Zoo which was enough to win

- ^{1} means they went first in the battle, ^{2} means they went second in the battle

Judge Votes
Match	(Switzerland) Tuff Kid	(France) Junior	(Germany) Benny	(United States) Wicket	(Japan) Taisuke
(Japan) **Issei** vs (Brazil) Luka	(Japan) **Issei**	(Japan) **Issei**	(Japan) **Issei**	(Japan) **Issei**	(Japan) **Issei**
(Morocco) Cri6 vs (Mexico) **Dr. Hill**	(Mexico) **Dr. Hill**	(Mexico) **Dr. Hill**	(Mexico) **Dr. Hill**	(Mexico) **Dr. Hill**	(Morocco) Cri6
(Morocco) **The Wolfer** vs (Japan) Nori	(Japan) Nori	(Morocco) **The Wolfer**	(Morocco) **The Wolfer**	(Morocco) **The Wolfer**	(Japan) Nori
(United Kingdom) Sunni vs (United States) **Luigi**	(United Kingdom) Sunni	(United States) **Luigi**	(United Kingdom) Sunni	(United States) **Luigi**	(United States) **Luigi**
(Morocco) **Lil Zoo** vs (South Korea) Vero	(Morocco) **Lil Zoo**	(Morocco) **Lil Zoo**	(Morocco) **Lil Zoo**	(Morocco) **Lil Zoo**	(South Korea) Vero
(France) **Lil Kev** vs (Netherlands) Kid Colombia	(Netherlands) Kid Colombia	(France) **Lil Kev**	(France) **Lil Kev**	(France) **Lil Kev**	(Netherlands) Kid Colombia
(United States) **Victor** vs (Brazil) Leony	(United States) **Victor**	(United States) **Victor**	(United States) **Victor**	(United States) **Victor**	(United States) **Victor**
(Ukraine) **Uzee Rock** vs (Spain) Chey	(Ukraine) **Uzee Rock**	(Ukraine) **Uzee Rock**	(Ukraine) **Uzee Rock**	(Ukraine) **Uzee Rock**	(Ukraine) **Uzee Rock**
(Japan) Issei vs (Mexico) **Dr. Hill**	(Mexico) **Dr. Hill**	(Japan) Issei	(Mexico) **Dr. Hill**	(Japan) Issei	(Mexico) **Dr. Hill**
(Morocco) The Wolfer vs (United States) **Luigi**	(United States) **Luigi**	(United States) **Luigi**	(Morocco) The Wolfer	(Morocco) The Wolfer	(United States) **Luigi**
(Morocco) **Lil Zoo** vs (France) Lil Kev	(Morocco) **Lil Zoo**	(France) Lil Kev	(Morocco) **Lil Zoo**	(Morocco) **Lil Zoo**	(Morocco) **Lil Zoo**
(United States) **Victor** vs (Ukraine) Uzee Rock	(Ukraine) Uzee Rock	(United States) **Victor**	(United States) **Victor**	(United States) **Victor**	(United States) **Victor**
(Mexico) Dr. Hill vs **(United States) Luigi**	(Mexico) Dr. Hill	**(United States) Luigi**	(Mexico) Dr. Hill	**(United States) Luigi**	**(United States) Luigi**
(Morocco) **Lil Zoo** vs (United States) Victor	(Morocco) **Lil Zoo**	(Morocco) **Lil Zoo**	(Morocco) **Lil Zoo**	(Morocco) **Lil Zoo**	(United States) Victor
(United States) Luigi vs (Morocco) **Lil Zoo**	(Morocco) **Lil Zoo**	(Morocco) **Lil Zoo**	(Morocco) **Lil Zoo**	?	(United States) Luigi

==== B-Girl World Final ====
Location: Zurich, Switzerland

Round of 16
(Russia) Mess^{1}	1*
(United Kingdom) **Roxy**^{2}	**3***
(Finland) AT^{2}	0
(France) **San Andrea**^{1}	**5**
(Japan) **Ayumi**^{1}	**5**
(Canada) JK47^{2}	0
(France) **Sarah Bee**^{2}	**5**
(South Korea) Primary Soul^{1}	0
(Japan) **Ami**^{2}	**3***
(Russia) Kastet^{1}	1*
(Ukraine) **Kate**^{1}	**4***
(Brazil) Mini Japa^{2}	0*
(United States) **Sunny**^{2}	**4***
(Poland) Paulina^{1}	0*
(Japan) **Narumi**^{2}	**4***
(Kazakhstan) Sayora^{1}	0*

Quarterfinals
(United Kingdom) Roxy^{2}	1
(France) **San Andrea**^{1}	**4**
(Japan) **Ayumi**^{1}	**3***
(France) Sarah Bee^{2}	1*
(Japan) **Ami**^{2}	**3***
(Ukraine) Kate^{1}	1*
(United States) Sunny^{1}	1
(Japan) **Narumi**^{2}	**4**

Semifinals
(France) **San Andrea**^{1}	**3**
(Japan) Ayumi^{2}	2
(Japan) **Ami**^{1}	**5**
(Japan) Narumi^{2}	0

Finals
(Japan) **Ami**^{2}	**3***
(France) San Andrea^{1}	1*

In the videos for Mess vs Roxy, Ami vs Kastet, Kate vs Mini Japa, Sunny vs Paulina, Narumi vs Paulina, Ayuma vs Sarah Bee and Ami vs Kate one of the judges votes couldn't be seen.

In Ami vs San Andrea, Taisuke didn't get to show his vote after Wicket showed the 3rd vote for Ami, which was enough to win.

- ^{1} means they went first in the battle, ^{2} means they went second in the battle

=== 2017 ===
The 2017 Red Bull BC One was held in Amsterdam, Netherlands, on November 4, 2017.

This was the first addition of a b-girl before Redbull BC One introduced B girl finals, featuring Ayumi from Body Carnival.

Judges:

- (United States) Crazy Legs (Rock Steady Crew)
- (South Korea) Hong 10 (Drifterz / 7 Commandoz)
- (Netherlands) Niek (The Ruggeds)
- (Ukraine) Intact (Ruffneck Attack)
- (Finland) AT (Flow Mo)

MC:

- (United States) Rakaa (Dilated Peoples / Rock Steady Crew / Universal Zulu Nation)

DJ:

- (Netherlands) DJ Nobunaga (Extraordinary Gentlemen)

==== B-boy World Final ====
Location: Amsterdam, Netherlands

Round of 16
(United States) **Thesis**^{1}	**5**
(Brazil) Leony^{2}	0
(Morocco) **Lil Zoo**^{2}	**3**
(Netherlands) Shane^{1}	2
(Japan) **Issei**^{1}	**5**
(France) Willy^{2}	0
(South Korea) **Wing**^{1}	**5**
(France) Dany^{2}	0
(South Korea) **Kill**^{1}	**3**
(Japan) Ayumi^{2}	2
(Netherlands) **Menno**^{1}	**5**
(Brazil) Ratin^{2}	0
(Ukraine) Lussy Sky^{2}	1
(Japan) **Shigekix**^{1}	**4**
(Russia) **Alkolil**^{2}	**3**
(United States) Moy^{1}	2

Quarterfinals
(United States) Thesis^{2}	2
(Morocco) **Lil Zoo**^{1}	**3**
(Japan) Issei^{1}	1
(South Korea) **Wing**^{2}	**4**
(South Korea) Kill^{2}	0
(Netherlands) **Menno**^{1}	**5**
(Japan) **Shigekix**^{1}	**3**
(Russia) Alkolil^{2}	2

Semifinals
(Morocco) Lil Zoo^{1}	1
(South Korea) **Wing**^{2}	**4**
(Netherlands) **Menno**^{2}	**4**
(Japan) Shigekix^{1}	1

Finals
(Netherlands) **Menno**^{1}	**4***
(South Korea) Wing^{2}	0*

Hong 10 didn't show his vote after Niek showed his vote for Menno, which was the 3rd vote for Menno which was enough to win, Crazy Legs showed his vote though, he voted for Menno.

- ^{1} means they went first in the battle, ^{2} means they went second in the battle

Judge Votes
Match	(Finland) AT	(Ukraine) Intact	(Netherlands) Niek	(United States) Crazy Legs	(South Korea) Hong 10
(United States) **Thesis** vs (Brazil) Leony	(United States) **Thesis**	(United States) **Thesis**	(United States) **Thesis**	(United States) **Thesis**	(United States) **Thesis**
(Morocco) **Lil Zoo** vs (Netherlands) Shane	(Morocco) **Lil Zoo**	(Netherlands) Shane	(Netherlands) Shane	(Morocco) **Lil Zoo**	(Morocco) **Lil Zoo**
(Japan) **Issei** vs (France) Willy	(Japan) **Issei**	(Japan) **Issei**	(Japan) **Issei**	(Japan) **Issei**	(Japan) **Issei**
(South Korea) **Wing** vs (France) Dany	(South Korea) **Wing**	(South Korea) **Wing**	(South Korea) **Wing**	(South Korea) **Wing**	(South Korea) **Wing**
(South Korea) **Kill** vs (Japan) Ayumi	(Japan) Ayumi	(Japan) Ayumi	(South Korea) **Kill**	(South Korea) **Kill**	(South Korea) **Kill**
(Netherlands) **Menno** vs (Brazil) Ratin	(Netherlands) **Menno**	(Netherlands) **Menno**	(Netherlands) **Menno**	(Netherlands) **Menno**	(Netherlands) **Menno**
(Ukraine) Lussy Sky vs (Japan) **Shigekix**	(Japan) **Shigekix**	(Japan) **Shigekix**	(Ukraine) Lussy Sky	(Japan) **Shigekix**	(Japan) **Shigekix**
(Russia) **Alkolil** vs (United States) Moy	(Russia) **Alkolil**	(Russia) **Alkolil**	(Russia) **Alkolil**	(United States) Moy	(United States) Moy
(United States) Thesis vs (Morocco) **Lil Zoo**	(Morocco) **Lil Zoo**	(United States) Thesis	(Morocco) **Lil Zoo**	(Morocco) **Lil Zoo**	(United States) Thesis
(Japan) Issei vs (South Korea) **Wing**	(Japan) Issei	(South Korea) **Wing**	(South Korea) **Wing**	(South Korea) **Wing**	(South Korea) **Wing**
(South Korea) Kill vs (Netherlands) **Menno**	(Netherlands) **Menno**	(Netherlands) **Menno**	(Netherlands) **Menno**	(Netherlands) **Menno**	(Netherlands) **Menno**
(Japan) **Shigekix** vs (Russia) Alkolil	(Japan) **Shigekix**	(Russia) Alkolil	(Russia) Alkolil	(Japan) **Shigekix**	(Japan) **Shigekix**
(Morocco) Lil Zoo vs (South Korea) **Wing**	(South Korea) **Wing**	(South Korea) **Wing**	(South Korea) **Wing**	(Morocco) Lil Zoo	(South Korea) **Wing**
(Netherlands) **Menno** vs (Japan) Shigekix	(Netherlands) **Menno**	(Netherlands) **Menno**	(Netherlands) **Menno**	(Japan) Shigekix	(Netherlands) **Menno**
(South Korea) Wing vs **(Netherlands) Menno**	**(Netherlands) Menno**	**(Netherlands) Menno**	**(Netherlands) Menno**	**(Netherlands) Menno**	?

=== 2016 ===
Red Bull BC One held camps around the world that featured traditional cyphers. It no longer held the six regional finals from previous years. Camps were held in Austria, France, South Africa, Italy, Japan, and Ukraine.

In 2016, Toronto also held the first direct Canadian qualifier for the world final in Nagoya, Japan.

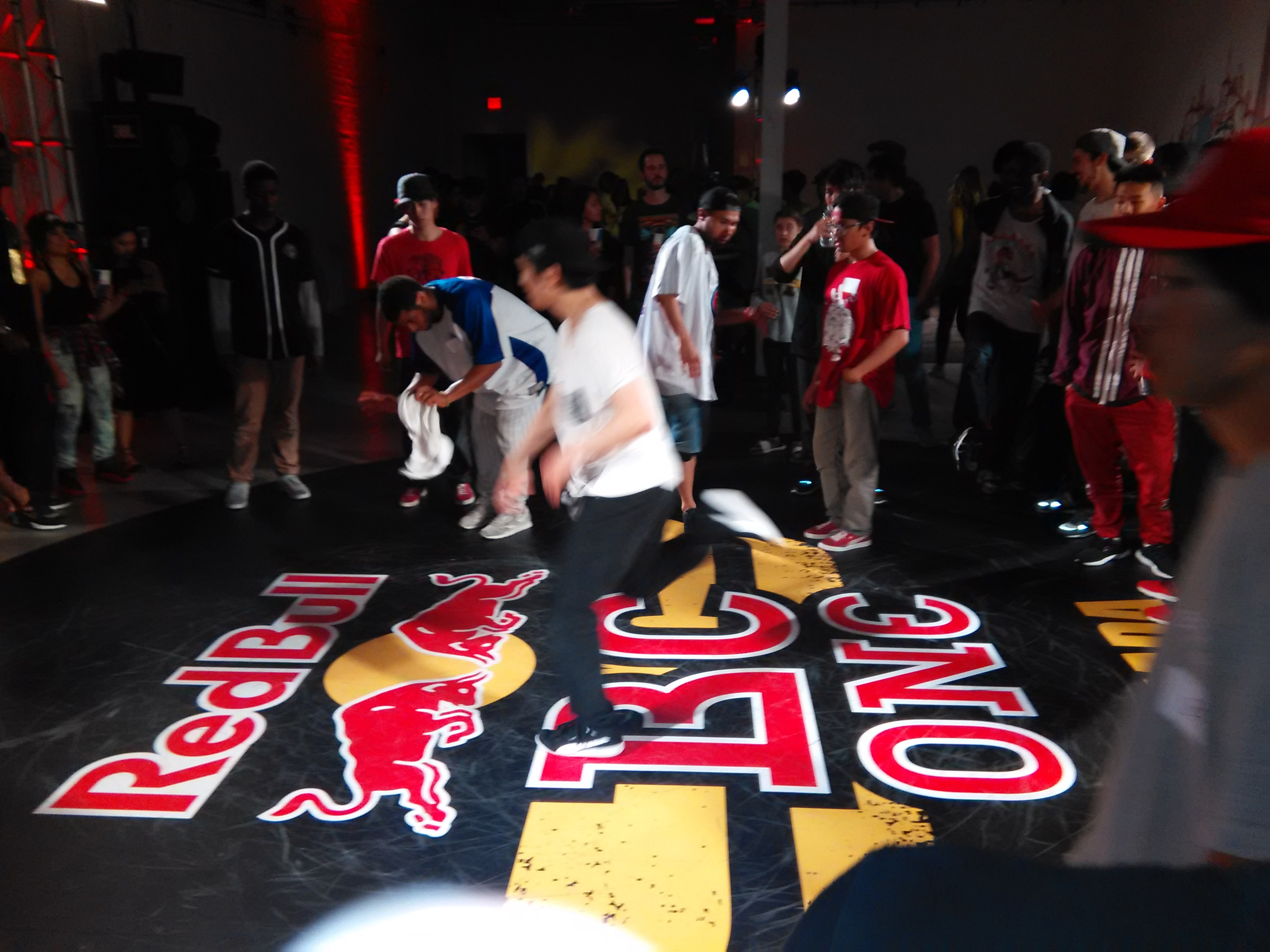
2016 Canadian national breakdancing competition at Red Bull BC One in Toronto, 2016

The winners of each cypher competed in a Last Chance Cypher to qualify to the World Finals in Aichi Prefectural Gymnasium, Nagoya, Japan on December 3. With the winners of the Last Chance Cypher going against each other in Nagoya alongside fifteen Wild Card entries, chosen by an international team of B-Boy experts.

The 2016 event was the final BC One that would feature Taisuke, as he announced his retirement from this competition. Thus, Issei's victory making him the first Japanese champion of Red Bull BC One.

Judges:

- (Germany) Storm (Battle Squad)
- (Sweden) Freeze (Ghost Crew)
- (United States) Wicket (Renegade Rockers)
- (Japan) Kosuke (Waseda Breakers)
- (France) Mounir (Vagabonds)

MC:

- (United States) Rakaa (Dilated Peoples / Rock Steady Crew / Universal Zulu Nation)

DJ:

- DJ Mar Ski (Universal Zulu Nation Japan)

==== B-boy World Final ====
Location: Nagoya, Japan

Round of 16
(Brazil) Leony^{2}	0
(Japan) **Taisuke**^{1}	**5**
(Finland) Focus^{1}	0
(South Korea) **Hong 10**^{2}	**5**
(Russia) Cheerito^{1}	0
(Portugal) **Bruce Almighty**^{2}	**5**
(Netherlands) Kid Colombia^{2}	1
(Brazil) **Neguin**^{1}	**4**
(United States) Benstacks^{1}	1
(United Kingdom) **Sunni**^{2}	**4**
(France) Soso^{2}	0
(Japan) **Issei**^{1}	**5**
(Ukraine) Kuzya^{2}	2
(Japan) **Nori**^{1}	**3**
(Poland) Kleju^{1}	0
(United States) **Victor**^{2}	**5**

Quarterfinals
(Japan) Taisuke^{1}	2
(South Korea) **Hong 10**^{2}	**3**
(Portugal) **Bruce Almighty**^{1}	**3**
(Brazil) Neguin^{2}	2
(United Kingdom) Sunni^{1}	2
(Japan) **Issei**^{2}	**3**
(Japan) Nori^{1}	0
(United States) **Victor**^{2}	**5**

Semifinals
(South Korea) **Hong 10**^{2}	**4**
(Portugal) Bruce Almighty^{1}	1
(Japan) **Issei**^{1}	**5**
(United States) Victor^{2}	0

Finals
(Japan) **Issei**^{1}	**3**
(South Korea) Hong 10^{2}	2

- ^{1} means they went first in the battle, ^{2} means they went second in the battle

Judge Votes
Match	(Japan) Kosuke	(Sweden) Freeze	(France) Mounir	(United States) Wicket	(Germany) Storm
(Brazil) Leony vs (Japan) **Taisuke**	(Japan) **Taisuke**	(Japan) **Taisuke**	(Japan) **Taisuke**	(Japan) **Taisuke**	(Japan) **Taisuke**
(Finland) Focus vs (South Korea) **Hong 10**	(South Korea) **Hong 10**	(South Korea) **Hong 10**	(South Korea) **Hong 10**	(South Korea) **Hong 10**	(South Korea) **Hong 10**
(Russia) Cheerito vs (Portugal) **Bruce Almighty**	(Portugal) **Bruce Almighty**	(Portugal) **Bruce Almighty**	(Portugal) **Bruce Almighty**	(Portugal) **Bruce Almighty**	(Portugal) **Bruce Almighty**
(Netherlands) Kid Colombia vs (Brazil) **Neguin**	(Netherlands) Kid Colombia	(Brazil) **Neguin**	(Brazil) **Neguin**	(Brazil) **Neguin**	(Brazil) **Neguin**
(United States) Benstacks vs (United Kingdom) **Sunni**	(United States) Benstacks	(United Kingdom) **Sunni**	(United Kingdom) **Sunni**	(United Kingdom) **Sunni**	(United Kingdom) **Sunni**
(France) Soso vs (Japan) **Issei**	(Japan) **Issei**	(Japan) **Issei**	(Japan) **Issei**	(Japan) **Issei**	(Japan) **Issei**
(Ukraine) Kuzya vs (Japan) **Nori**	(Japan) **Nori**	(Ukraine) Kuzya	(Japan) **Nori**	(Japan) **Nori**	(Ukraine) Kuzya
(Poland) Kleju vs (United States) **Victor**	(United States) **Victor**	(United States) **Victor**	(United States) **Victor**	(United States) **Victor**	(United States) **Victor**
(Japan) Taisuke vs (South Korea) **Hong 10**	(South Korea) **Hong 10**	(Japan) Taisuke	(Japan) Taisuke	(South Korea) **Hong 10**	(South Korea) **Hong 10**
(Portugal) **Bruce Almighty** vs (Brazil) Neguin	(Portugal) **Bruce Almighty**	(Portugal) **Bruce Almighty**	(Portugal) **Bruce Almighty**	(Brazil) Neguin	(Brazil) Neguin
(United Kingdom) Sunni vs **(Japan) Issei**	**(Japan) Issei**	**(Japan) Issei**	(United Kingdom) Sunni	**(Japan) Issei**	(United Kingdom) Sunni
(Japan) Nori vs (United States) **Victor**	(United States) **Victor**	(United States) **Victor**	(United States) **Victor**	(United States) **Victor**	(United States) **Victor**
(South Korea) **Hong 10** vs (Portugal) Bruce Almighty	(Portugal) Bruce Almighty	(South Korea) **Hong 10**	(South Korea) **Hong 10**	(South Korea) **Hong 10**	(South Korea) **Hong 10**
**(Japan) Issei** vs (United States) Victor	**(Japan) Issei**	**(Japan) Issei**	**(Japan) Issei**	**(Japan) Issei**	**(Japan) Issei**
(South Korea) Hong 10 vs **(Japan) Issei**	**(Japan) Issei**	(South Korea) Hong 10	**(Japan) Issei**	(South Korea) Hong 10	**(Japan) Issei**

=== 2015 ===
On November 14, 2015, the Red Bull BC One World Finals, took place in Rome's Palazzo dei Congressi.

Judges:

- (Italy) Cico (Spinkingz)
- (Finland) Focus (Flow Mo)
- (South Korea) Wing (Jinjo Crew / 7 Commandoz)
- (France) Lamine (Vagabonds)
- (United States) Poe One (Style Elements / Mighty Zulu Kingz)

MC:

- (United States) MC Supernatural

DJ:

- (France) DJ Marrrtin (Funky Bijou)

==== B-boy World Final ====
Location: Rome, Italy

Red Bull BC One 2015 Bracket

Round of 16
(Netherlands) **Menno**^{2}	**4**
(United States) Kareem^{1}	1
(Japan) Kazuki Rock^{1}	2
(South Korea) **Pocket**^{2}	**3**
(United Kingdom) Sunni^{2}	1
(Portugal) **Bruce Almighty**^{1}	**4**
(Russia) **Alkolil**^{2}	**4**
(Poland) Thomaz^{1}	1
(South Korea) Leon^{2}	2
(Morocco) **Lil Zoo**^{1}	**3**
(United States) **El Niño**^{2}	**3**
(Kazakhstan) Killa Kolya^{1}	2
(United States) **Victor**^{1}	**5**
(Brazil) Ratin^{2}	0
(Japan) **Issei**^{1}	**3***
(France) Nasso^{2}	1*

Quarterfinals
(Netherlands) Menno^{1}	1
(South Korea) **Pocket**^{2}	**4**
(Portugal) **Bruce Almighty**^{2}	**5**
(Russia) Alkolil^{1}	0
(Morocco) **Lil Zoo**^{1}	**5**
(United States) El Niño^{2}	0
(United States) **Victor**^{2}	**4**
(Japan) Issei^{1}	1

Semifinals
(South Korea) Pocket^{2}	0
(Portugal) **Bruce Almighty**^{1}	**5**
(Morocco) Lil Zoo^{1/1}	1
(United States) **Victor**^{2/2}	**4**

Finals
(United States) **Victor**^{2}	**3**
(Portugal) Bruce Almighty^{1}	2

After winning Red Bull BC One, the last event of the World BBoy Series, Victor ( (United States) ) earned a triple pass to Undisputed.

If a battle is italicized it means it was initially a tie and went into an extra round.

In Issei vs Nasso, Lamine voted TIE.

- ^{1} means they went first in the battle, ^{2} means they went second in the battle. A slash denotes before/in the overtime round, for an example ^{1/2} means that they went 1st before the overtime and 2nd in the overtime

Judge Votes
Match	(Finland) Focus	(South Korea) Wing	(Italy) Cico	(France) Lamine	(United States) Poe One
(Netherlands) **Menno** vs (United States) Kareem	(Netherlands) **Menno**	(Netherlands) **Menno**	(United States) Kareem	(Netherlands) **Menno**	(Netherlands) **Menno**
(Japan) Kazuki Rock vs (South Korea) **Pocket**	(Japan) Kazuki Rock	(South Korea) **Pocket**	(Japan) Kazuki Rock	(South Korea) **Pocket**	(South Korea) **Pocket**
(United Kingdom) Sunni vs (Portugal) **Bruce Almighty**	(Portugal) **Bruce Almighty**	(Portugal) **Bruce Almighty**	(Portugal) **Bruce Almighty**	(United Kingdom) Sunni	(Portugal) **Bruce Almighty**
(Russia) **Alkolil** vs (Poland) Thomaz	(Poland) Thomaz	(Russia) **Alkolil**	(Russia) **Alkolil**	(Russia) **Alkolil**	(Russia) **Alkolil**
(South Korea) Leon vs (Morocco) **Lil Zoo**	(Morocco) **Lil Zoo**	(South Korea) Leon	(South Korea) Leon	(Morocco) **Lil Zoo**	(Morocco) **Lil Zoo**
(United States) **El Niño** vs (Kazakhstan) Killa Kolya	(United States) **El Niño**	(United States) **El Niño**	(United States) **El Niño**	(Kazakhstan) Killa Kolya	(Kazakhstan) Killa Kolya
(United States) **Victor** vs (Brazil) Ratin	(United States) **Victor**	(United States) **Victor**	(United States) **Victor**	(United States) **Victor**	(United States) **Victor**
(Japan) **Issei** vs (France) Nasso	(Japan) **Issei**	(Japan) **Issei**	(Japan) **Issei**	TIE	(France) Nasso
(Netherlands) Menno vs (South Korea) **Pocket**	(Netherlands) Menno	(South Korea) **Pocket**	(South Korea) **Pocket**	(South Korea) **Pocket**	(South Korea) **Pocket**
(Portugal) **Bruce Almighty** vs (Russia) Alkolil	(Portugal) **Bruce Almighty**	(Portugal) **Bruce Almighty**	(Portugal) **Bruce Almighty**	(Portugal) **Bruce Almighty**	(Portugal) **Bruce Almighty**
(Morocco) **Lil Zoo** vs (United States) El Niño	(Morocco) **Lil Zoo**	(Morocco) **Lil Zoo**	(Morocco) **Lil Zoo**	(Morocco) **Lil Zoo**	(Morocco) **Lil Zoo**
(United States) **Victor** vs (Japan) Issei	(United States) **Victor**	(Japan) Issei	(United States) **Victor**	(United States) **Victor**	(United States) **Victor**
(South Korea) Pocket vs **(Portugal) Bruce Almighty**	**(Portugal) Bruce Almighty**	**(Portugal) Bruce Almighty**	**(Portugal) Bruce Almighty**	**(Portugal) Bruce Almighty**	**(Portugal) Bruce Almighty**
(Morocco) Lil Zoo vs (United States) **Victor**	(United States) Victor/ **(United States) Victor**	(Morocco) Lil Zoo/ **(United States) Victor**	TIE/ (Morocco) Lil Zoo	(Morocco) Lil Zoo/ **(United States) Victor**	(United States) Victor/ **(United States) Victor**
(Portugal) Bruce Almighty vs (United States) **Victor**	(United States) **Victor**	(United States) **Victor**	(Portugal) Bruce Almighty	(United States) **Victor**	(Portugal) Bruce Almighty

A slash signifies before/after the extra round.

=== 2014 ===
In 2014 Red Bull BC One took place in Paris, France with a round-by-round judging system used by Undisputed. The round-by-round judging format allows boys to see the judges decision after every round. The battle is set for 3 rounds (Finals is 5) but can end if a boy beats his opponent in 2.

However, this judging system received a lot of criticism from Red Bull BC One fans throughout social media following the event. Bboys and fans alike, both disagreed with the judges's decisions after many individual battles.

Many argued that it was the worst Red Bull BC one competition since its initiation. Due to Menno's ( (Netherlands) ) victory and Chelles Battle Pro, Gravity ( (United States) ) was awarded the final spot at Undisputed at the end of the year following Red Bull BC One.

Judges:

- (South Korea) The End (Gamblerz / C.A.Y. Crew)
- (Russia) Yan the Shrimp (Allthemost Crew)
- (United States) Ken Swift (Rock Steady Crew)
- (France) Yaman (Wanted Posse)
- (United States) Luigi (Skill Methods / Skill Brat Renegades)

MC:

- (France) Joey Starr

DJ

- (United States) DJ Lean Rock (Squadron)

==== B-boy World Final ====
Location: Paris, France

Round of 16
(South Africa) Benny^{2}	2|**3**|0
(United States) **Thesis**^{1}	**3**|2|**5**
**(Netherlands) Menno**^{1}	**5**|**3**
(Australia) Blond^{2}	0|2
(United States) **Victor**^{1}	**4**|**3**
(South Korea) Hong 10^{2}	1|2
(Russia) **Alkolil**^{1}	**4**|**5**
(France) Lilou^{2}	1|0
(United States) **Gravity**^{1}	**3***|1|**4**
(France) Mounir^{2}	1*|**4**|1
**(Russia) Cheerito**^{2}	**4**|**5**
(Venezuela) Lil G^{1}	1|0
(Brazil) Luan^{1}	2*|2|0
(Japan) **Taisuke**^{2}	2*|**3**|**5**
(France) Tonio^{1}	2|1
(South Korea) **Wing**^{2}	**3**|**4**

Quarter-finals
(United States) Thesis^{1}	0|1
(Netherlands) **Menno**^{2}	**5**|**4**
(United States) Victor^{1}	**4**|1*|2
(Russia) **Alkolil**^{2}	1|**3***|**3**
(United States) Gravity^{2}	0*|**3**|1*
(Russia) **Cheerito**^{1}	**3***|2|**2***
(Japan) **Taisuke**^{2}	**3***|2|**4**
(South Korea) Wing^{1}	1*|**3**|1

Semi-finals
(Netherlands) **Menno**^{2}	**4***|**3**
(Russia) Alkolil^{1}	0*|2
(Russia) Cheerito^{1}	**3**|0|1*
(Japan) **Taisuke**^{2}	2|**5**|**2***

Final
(Netherlands) **Menno**^{1}	**4**|**5**|**4***
(Japan) Taisuke^{2}	1|0|0*
Third place

- ^{1} means they went first in the battle, ^{2} means they went second in the battle.

=== 2013 ===
Red Bull BC One took place in Seoul, South Korea, on November 30, 2013.

Judges:

- (United States) Poe One (Style Elements / Mighty Zulu Kingz)
- (United States) El Niño (Floor Lords / Flava Squad / Squadron / Boogie Brats)
- (South Korea) Ducky (Drifterz / Floor Gangz)
- (Germany) Storm (Battle Squad)
- (France) Lamine (Vagabonds)

MC:

- (South Korea) Jay Park

DJ:

- (United States) DJ Lean Rock (Squadron)

==== B-boy World Final ====
Location: Seoul, Korea

Red Bull BC One 2013 Bracket

Individuals in bold won their respective battles.

Round of 16
(United States) **Roxrite**^{2}	**5**
(Colombia) Arex^{1}	0
(France) **Lilou**^{2}	**3**
(Japan) Taisuke^{1}	2
(United States) Ronnie^{2}	0
(United States) **Gravity**^{1}	**5**
(France) **Mounir**^{2}	**5**
(Italy) Froz^{1}	0
(South Korea) **Wing**^{2}	**5**
(Japan) Nori^{1}	0
(United States) Omar^{2}	0
(Ukraine) **Robin**^{1}	**5**
(Brazil) Neguin^{1}	1
(Morocco) **Lil Zoo**^{2}	**4**
(South Korea) **Hong 10**^{2}	**3***
(Netherlands) Menno^{1}	1*

Quarter-finals
(United States) Roxrite^{1}	1
(France) **Lilou**^{2}	**4**
(United States) Gravity^{1}	1
(France) **Mounir**^{2}	**4**
(South Korea) **Wing**^{2}	**5**
(Ukraine) Robin^{1}	0
(Morocco) Lil Zoo^{1}	0
(South Korea) **Hong 10**^{2}	**5**

Semi-finals
(France) Lilou^{1}	0
(France) **Mounir**^{2}	**5**
(South Korea) Wing^{1}	1
(South Korea) **Hong 10**^{2}	**4**

Final
(France) Mounir^{1}	1
(South Korea) **Hong 10**^{2}	**4**
Third place

In Hong 10 vs Menno, El Niño voted TIE

- ^{1} means they went first in the battle, ^{2} means they went second in the battle.

Judge Votes
Match	(United States) El Niño	(France) Lamine	(United States) Poe One	(Germany) Storm	(South Korea) Ducky
(United States) **Roxrite** vs (Colombia) Arex	(United States) **Roxrite**	(United States) **Roxrite**	(United States) **Roxrite**	(United States) **Roxrite**	(United States) **Roxrite**
(France) **Lilou** vs (Japan) Taisuke	(Japan) Taisuke	(France) **Lilou**	(France) **Lilou**	(France) **Lilou**	(Japan) Taisuke
(United States) Ronnie vs (United States) **Gravity**	(United States) **Gravity**	(United States) **Gravity**	(United States) **Gravity**	(United States) **Gravity**	(United States) **Gravity**
(France) **Mounir** vs (Italy) Froz	(France) **Mounir**	(France) **Mounir**	(France) **Mounir**	(France) **Mounir**	(France) **Mounir**
(South Korea) **Wing** vs (Japan) Nori	(South Korea) **Wing**	(South Korea) **Wing**	(South Korea) **Wing**	(South Korea) **Wing**	(South Korea) **Wing**
(United States) Omar vs (Ukraine) **Robin**	(Ukraine) **Robin**	(Ukraine) **Robin**	(Ukraine) **Robin**	(Ukraine) **Robin**	(Ukraine) **Robin**
(Brazil) Neguin vs (Morocco) **Lil Zoo**	(Morocco) **Lil Zoo**	(Brazil) Neguin	(Morocco) **Lil Zoo**	(Morocco) **Lil Zoo**	(Morocco) **Lil Zoo**
(South Korea) **Hong 10** vs (Netherlands) Menno	TIE	(Netherlands) Menno	(South Korea) **Hong 10**	(South Korea) **Hong 10**	(South Korea) **Hong 10**
(United States) Roxrite vs (France) **Lilou**	(United States) Roxrite	(France) **Lilou**	(France) **Lilou**	(France) **Lilou**	(France) **Lilou**
(United States) Gravity vs (France) **Mounir**	(France) **Mounir**	(France) **Mounir**	(United States) Gravity	(France) **Mounir**	(France) **Mounir**
(South Korea) **Wing** vs (Ukraine) Robin	(South Korea) **Wing**	(South Korea) **Wing**	(South Korea) **Wing**	(South Korea) **Wing**	(South Korea) **Wing**
(Morocco) Lil Zoo vs (South Korea) **Hong 10**	(South Korea) **Hong 10**	(South Korea) **Hong 10**	(South Korea) **Hong 10**	(South Korea) **Hong 10**	(South Korea) **Hong 10**
(France) Lilou vs (France) **Mounir**	(France) **Mounir**	(France) **Mounir**	(France) **Mounir**	(France) **Mounir**	(France) **Mounir**
(South Korea) Wing vs (South Korea) **Hong 10**	(South Korea) Wing	(South Korea) **Hong 10**	(South Korea) **Hong 10**	(South Korea) **Hong 10**	(South Korea) **Hong 10**
(France) Mounir vs (South Korea) **Hong 10**	(South Korea) **Hong 10**	(France) Mounir	(South Korea) **Hong 10**	(South Korea) **Hong 10**	(South Korea) **Hong 10**

=== 2012 ===
Red Bull BC One took place in Rio de Janeiro, Brazil on December 8, 2012.

Judges:

- (Brazil) Neguin (Tsunami All-Stars)
- (Japan) Taisuke (All Area Crew / Flooriorz / Mighty Zulu Kingz)
- (United States) Moy (Havikoro)
- (Netherlands) Niek (The Ruggeds)
- (Germany) Storm (Battle Squad)

MC:

- (Brazil) Dughettu

DJ:

- (United States) DJ Skeme Richards (Rock Steady Crew)

==== B-boy World Final ====
Location: Rio de Janeiro, Brazil

Red Bull BC One 2012 Bracket

Individuals in bold won their respective battles.

Round of 16
(Bulgaria) Slav ^{2}	0
(Mexico) **Hill** ^{1}	**5**
(United States) **Vicious Victor** ^{1}	**4**
(Japan) Issei ^{2}	1
(United Kingdom) Sunni ^{1}	0
(South Korea) **Differ** ^{2}	**5**
(United States) **Roxrite** ^{1}	**5**
(Colombia) Arex ^{2}	0
(South Korea) Shorty Force ^{2}	0
(France) **Junior** ^{1}	**5**
(United States) **Kid David** ^{1}	**5**
(Morocco) Lil Zoo ^{2}	0
(France) **Mounir** ^{2}	**5**
(United States) DOMkey ^{1}	0
(Russia) ExacT ^{1}	0
(Brazil) **Klesio** ^{2}	**5**

Quarter-finals
(Mexico) **Hill**^{2}	**W***
(United States) Vicious Victor^{1}	L*
(South Korea) **Differ**^{2}	**4**
(United States) Roxrite^{1}	1
(France) **Junior**^{2}	**4**
(United States) Kid David^{1}	1
(France) **Mounir**^{1}	**4**
(Brazil) Klesio^{2}	1

Semi-finals
(Mexico) Hill^{2}	1
(South Korea) **Differ**^{1}	**4**
(France) Junior^{2}	2
(France) **Mounir**^{1}	**3**

Final
(South Korea) Differ^{2}	0
(France) **Mounir**^{1}	**5**
Third place

In the video for Hill vs Vicious Victor, the judges scorecards were not shown

- ^{1} means they went first in the battle, ^{2} means they went second in the battle.

Judge Votes
Match	(Japan) Taisuke	(Germany) Storm	(Netherlands) Niek	(United States) Moy	(Brazil) Neguin
(Bulgaria) Slav vs (Mexico) **Hill**	(Mexico) **Hill**	(Mexico) **Hill**	(Mexico) **Hill**	(Mexico) **Hill**	(Mexico) **Hill**
(United States) **Vicious Victor** vs (Japan) Issei	(United States) **Vicious Victor**	(Japan) Issei	(United States) **Vicious Victor**	(United States) **Vicious Victor**	(United States) **Vicious Victor**
(United Kingdom) Sunni vs (South Korea) **Differ**	(South Korea) **Differ**	(South Korea) **Differ**	(South Korea) **Differ**	(South Korea) **Differ**	(South Korea) **Differ**
(United States) **Roxrite** vs (Colombia) Arex	(United States) **Roxrite**	(United States) **Roxrite**	(United States) **Roxrite**	(United States) **Roxrite**	(United States) **Roxrite**
(South Korea) Shorty Force vs (France) **Junior**	(France) **Junior**	(France) **Junior**	(France) **Junior**	(France) **Junior**	(France) **Junior**
(United States) **Kid David** vs (Morocco) Lil Zoo	(United States) **Kid David**	(United States) **Kid David**	(United States) **Kid David**	(United States) **Kid David**	(United States) **Kid David**
(France) **Mounir** vs (United States) DOMkey	(France) **Mounir**	(France) **Mounir**	(France) **Mounir**	(France) **Mounir**	(France) **Mounir**
(Russia) ExacT vs (Brazil) **Klesio**	(Brazil) **Klesio**	(Brazil) **Klesio**	(Brazil) **Klesio**	(Brazil) **Klesio**	(Brazil) **Klesio**
(Mexico) **Hill** vs (United States) Vicious Victor	?	?	?	?	?
(South Korea) **Differ** vs (United States) Roxrite	(United States) Roxrite	(South Korea) **Differ**	(South Korea) **Differ**	(South Korea) **Differ**	(South Korea) **Differ**
(France) **Junior** vs (United States) Kid David	(France) **Junior**	(France) **Junior**	(France) **Junior**	(United States) Kid David	(France) **Junior**
(France) **Mounir** vs (Brazil) Klesio	(France) **Mounir**	(France) **Mounir**	(France) **Mounir**	(France) **Mounir**	(Brazil) Klesio
(Mexico) Hill vs (South Korea) **Differ**	(South Korea) **Differ**	(South Korea) **Differ**	(South Korea) **Differ**	(Mexico) Hill	(South Korea) **Differ**
(France) Junior vs **(France) Mounir**	(France) Junior	**(France) Mounir**	(France) Junior	**(France) Mounir**	**(France) Mounir**
(South Korea) Differ vs **(France) Mounir**	**(France) Mounir**	**(France) Mounir**	**(France) Mounir**	**(France) Mounir**	**(France) Mounir**

=== 2011 ===
Red Bull BC One took place in Moscow, Russia on November 26, 2011.

Judges:

- (Russia) Bootuz (Predatorz)
- (France) Lamine (Vagabonds)
- (United States) Machine (Killafornia / Mighty Zulu Kingz)
- (Brazil) Pelezinho (Tsunami All-Stars)
- (South Korea) Wing (Jinjo Crew / 7 Commandoz)

MC:

- (United States) Rakaa Iriscience (Dilated Peoples / Rock Steady Crew / Universal Zulu Nation)

DJ:

- (United Kingdom) DJ Renegade (Soul Mavericks)

==== B-boy World Final ====
Location: Moscow, Russia

Red Bull BC One 2011 Bracket

Individuals in bold won their respective battles.

Round of 16
(Portugal) Lagaet^{1}	2
(United States) **El Niño**^{2}	**3**
(France) SoSo^{1}	0
(United States) **Roxrite**^{2}	**5**
(Russia) Flying Buddha^{1}	0
(Brazil) **Neguin** ^{2}	**5**
(South Korea) **Vero**^{2}	**4**
(Netherlands) Niek^{1}	1
(Venezuela) Salo^{1}	1
(United States) **Morris** ^{2}	**4**
(Vietnam) 3T ^{2}	0
(Japan) **Taisuke** ^{1}	**5**
(Russia) **Yan**^{1}	**4**
(South Korea) Hong 10 ^{2}	1
(Venezuela) **Lil G**^{2}	**4**
(France) Mounir^{1}	1

Quarter-finals
(United States) El Niño^{2}	2
(United States) **Roxrite** ^{1}	**3**
(Brazil) **Neguin**^{1/1}	**5**
(South Korea) Vero^{2/2}	0
(United States) **Morris**^{2}	**3***
(Japan) Taisuke ^{1}	1*
(Russia) Yan^{1}	0
(Venezuela) **Lil G**^{2}	**5**

Semi-finals
(United States) **Roxrite**^{1}	**3**
(Brazil) Neguin^{2}	2
(United States) Morris^{2}	1
(Venezuela) **Lil G**^{1}	**4**

Final
(United States) **Roxrite**^{1}	**4**
(Venezuela) Lil G^{2}	1
Third place

Negiun vs Vero went into an extra round.

- ^{1} means they went first in the battle, ^{2} means they went second in the battle. A slash denotes before/in the overtime round, for an example ^{1/2} means that they went 1st before the overtime and 2nd in the overtime

Judge Votes
Match	(Brazil) Pelezinho	(France) Lamine	(South Korea) Wing	(United States) Machine	(Russia) Bootuz
(Portugal) Lagaet vs (United States) **El Niño**	(Portugal) Lagaet	(United States) **El Niño**	(Portugal) Lagaet	(United States) **El Niño**	(United States) **El Niño**
(France) SoSo vs (United States) **Roxrite**	(United States) **Roxrite**	(United States) **Roxrite**	(United States) **Roxrite**	(United States) **Roxrite**	(United States) **Roxrite**
(Russia) Flying Buddha vs (Brazil) **Neguin**	(Brazil) **Neguin**	(Brazil) **Neguin**	(Brazil) **Neguin**	(Brazil) **Neguin**	(Brazil) **Neguin**
(South Korea) **Vero** vs (Netherlands) Niek	(Netherlands) Niek	(South Korea) **Vero**	(South Korea) **Vero**	(South Korea) **Vero**	(South Korea) **Vero**
(Venezuela) Salo vs (United States) **Morris**	(United States) **Morris**	(Venezuela) Salo	(United States) **Morris**	(United States) **Morris**	(United States) **Morris**
(Vietnam) 3T vs (Japan) **Taisuke**	(Japan) **Taisuke**	(Japan) **Taisuke**	(Japan) **Taisuke**	(Japan) **Taisuke**	(Japan) **Taisuke**
(Russia) **Yan** vs (South Korea) Hong 10	(Russia) **Yan**	(Russia) **Yan**	(South Korea) Hong 10	(Russia) **Yan**	(Russia) **Yan**
(Venezuela) **Lil G** vs (France) Mounir	(France) Mounir	(Venezuela) **Lil G**	(Venezuela) **Lil G**	(Venezuela) **Lil G**	(Venezuela) **Lil G**
(United States) El Niño vs (United States) **Roxrite**	(United States) El Niño	(United States) El Niño	(United States) **Roxrite**	(United States) **Roxrite**	(United States) **Roxrite**
(Brazil) **Neguin** vs (South Korea) Vero	(Brazil) Neguin/ (Brazil) **Neguin**	(Brazil) Neguin/ (Brazil) **Neguin**	(South Korea) Vero/ (Brazil) **Neguin**	TIE/ (Brazil) **Neguin**	(South Korea) Vero/ (Brazil) **Neguin**
(United States) **Morris** vs (Japan) Taisuke	(United States) **Morris**	(Japan) Taisuke	OT	(United States) **Morris**	(United States) **Morris**
(Russia) Yan vs (Venezuela) **Lil G**	(Venezuela) **Lil G**	(Venezuela) **Lil G**	(Venezuela) **Lil G**	(Venezuela) **Lil G**	(Venezuela) **Lil G**
(United States) **Roxrite** vs (Brazil) Neguin	(Brazil) Neguin	(Brazil) Neguin	(United States) **Roxrite**	(United States) **Roxrite**	(United States) **Roxrite**
(United States) Morris vs (Venezuela) **Lil G**	(Venezuela) **Lil G**	(Venezuela) **Lil G**	(Venezuela) **Lil G**	(Venezuela) **Lil G**	(United States) Morris
(United States) **Roxrite** vs (Venezuela) Lil G	(United States) **Roxrite**	(Venezuela) Lil G	(United States) **Roxrite**	(United States) **Roxrite**	(United States) **Roxrite**

=== 2010 ===
Red Bull BC One 2010 took place in Tokyo, Japan on November 27, 2010. This marks the first time the competition was held in Asia.

Judges:

- (United States) Ken Swift (Rock Steady Crew)
- (South Korea) Born (Rivers Crew / Floor Gangz / Mighty Zulu Kingz / Flava Squad)
- (Germany) Storm (Battle Squad)
- (United States) Roxrite (Break Disciples / Renegades / Squadron)
- (Algeria) Lilou (Pockemon Crew)

MC:

- (United States) Rahzel (former member of The Roots)

DJ:

- DJ Mar Ski (Universal Zulu Nation Japan)

==== B-boy World Final ====
Location: Tokyo, Japan

Red Bull BC One 2010 Bracket

Individuals in bold won their respective battles.

Round of 16
(United States) Gravity^{1}	2
(Venezuela) **Lil G**^{2}	**3**
(United States) Thesis^{1}	1
(Japan) **Toshiki**^{2}	**4**
(Poland) Kleju^{1}	2
(France) **Marcio**^{2}	**3**
(France) Keyz^{1}	1
(Brazil) **Neguin**^{2}	**4**
(Germany) **Airdit**^{1}	**5**
(South Korea) Beast^{2}	0
(South Korea) Kill^{2}	1*
(Netherlands) **Niek**^{1}	**3***
(Ukraine) **Pluto**^{1}	**4**
(Japan) Taisuke^{2}	1
(Brazil) Kapu^{1}	2
(United States) **Luigi**^{2}	**3**

Quarter-finals
(Venezuela) **Lil G**^{2}	**5**
(Japan) Toshiki^{1}	0
(France) Marcio^{2}	0
(Brazil) **Neguin**^{1}	**5**
(Germany) Airdit^{1}	2
(Netherlands) **Niek**^{2}	**3**
(Ukraine) Pluto^{1}	0
(United States) **Luigi**^{2}	**5**

Semi-finals
(Venezuela) Lil G^{2}	2
(Brazil) **Neguin**^{1}	**3**
(Netherlands) **Niek**^{1}	**3**
(United States) Luigi^{2}	2

Final
(Brazil) **Neguin**^{2}	**4**
(Netherlands) Niek^{1}	1
Third place

In the video for Kill vs Niek, Roxrite's vote cannot be seen

- ^{1} means they went first in the battle, ^{2} means they went second in the battle.

Judge Votes
Match	(United States) Ken Swift	(United States) Roxrite	(Germany) Storm	(South Korea) Born	(Algeria) Lilou
(United States) Gravity vs (Venezuela) **Lil G**	(Venezuela) **Lil G**	(Venezuela) **Lil G**	(Venezuela) **Lil G**	(United States) Gravity	(United States) Gravity
(United States) Thesis vs (Japan) **Toshiki**	(Japan) **Toshiki**	(Japan) **Toshiki**	(United States) Thesis	(Japan) **Toshiki**	(Japan) **Toshiki**
(Poland) Kleju vs (France) **Marcio**	(France) **Marcio**	(Poland) Kleju	(France) **Marcio**	(Poland) Kleju	(France) **Marcio**
(France) Keyz vs (Brazil) **Neguin**	(Brazil) **Neguin**	(Brazil) **Neguin**	(Brazil) **Neguin**	(Brazil) **Neguin**	(France) Keyz
(Germany) **Airdit** vs (South Korea) Beast	(Germany) **Airdit**	(Germany) **Airdit**	(Germany) **Airdit**	(Germany) **Airdit**	(Germany) **Airdit**
(South Korea) Kill vs (Netherlands) **Niek**	(Netherlands) **Niek**	?	(Netherlands) **Niek**	(South Korea) Kill	(Netherlands) **Niek**
(Ukraine) **Pluto** vs (Japan) Taisuke	(Ukraine) **Pluto**	(Ukraine) **Pluto**	(Ukraine) **Pluto**	(Ukraine) **Pluto**	(Japan) Taisuke
(Brazil) Kapu vs (United States) **Luigi**	(Brazil) Kapu	(United States) **Luigi**	(United States) **Luigi**	(United States) **Luigi**	(Brazil) Kapu
(Venezuela) **Lil G** vs (Japan) Toshiki	(Venezuela) **Lil G**	(Venezuela) **Lil G**	(Venezuela) **Lil G**	(Venezuela) **Lil G**	(Venezuela) **Lil G**
(France) Marcio vs (Brazil) **Neguin**	(Brazil) **Neguin**	(Brazil) **Neguin**	(Brazil) **Neguin**	(Brazil) **Neguin**	(Brazil) **Neguin**
(Germany) Airdit vs (Netherlands) **Niek**	(Germany) Airdit	(Netherlands) **Niek**	(Germany) Airdit	(Netherlands) **Niek**	(Netherlands) **Niek**
(Ukraine) Pluto vs (United States) **Luigi**	(United States) **Luigi**	(United States) **Luigi**	(United States) **Luigi**	(United States) **Luigi**	(United States) **Luigi**
(Venezuela) Lil G vs (Brazil) **Neguin**	(Brazil) **Neguin**	(Venezuela) Lil G	(Venezuela) Lil G	(Brazil) **Neguin**	(Brazil) **Neguin**
(Netherlands) **Niek** vs (United States) Luigi	(United States) Luigi	(Netherlands) **Niek**	(United States) Luigi	(Netherlands) **Niek**	(Netherlands) **Niek**
(Brazil) **Neguin** vs (Netherlands) Niek	(Brazil) **Neguin**	(Brazil) **Neguin**	(Brazil) **Neguin**	(Brazil) **Neguin**	(Netherlands) Niek

=== 2009 ===
Red Bull BC One was held on November 18, 2009, at the Hammerstein Ballroom in New York City. Tickets went on sale at midnight, October 9, 2009, and were sold out within 30 minutes.

Judges:

- (Japan) Katsu (All Area Crew / Mighty Zulu Kingz)
- (France) Salah (Vagabonds / Massive Monkees)
- (United States) Ronnie (Full Force / Super Cr3w / 7 Commandoz)
- (Italy) Cico (Spinkingz)
- (United States) Float (Incredible Breakers)

MC:

- (United States) KRS-One

DJ:

- (United States) DJ DP One (Turntable Anihilists / Supreme Beings)

==== B-boy World Final ====
Location: New York City, United States

Red Bull BC One 2009 Bracket

Individuals in bold won their respective battles.

{{Round16

If a battle is italicized it means it was initially a tie and went into an extra round.

In Neguin vs Menno, Ronnie voted TIE.

In Thesis vs Lilou, Katsu and Ronnie voted TIE.

- ^{1} means they went first in the battle, ^{2} means they went second in the battle. A slash denotes before/in the overtime round, for an example ^{1/2} means that they went 1st before the overtime and 2nd in the overtime

Judge Votes
Match	(France) Salah	(Italy) Cico	(United States) Float	(Japan) Katsu	(United States) Ronnie
(Brazil) **Neguin** vs (Portugal) Lagaet	(Brazil) **Neguin**	(Brazil) **Neguin**	(Brazil) **Neguin**	(Brazil) **Neguin**	(Portugal) Lagaet
(Netherlands) **Menno** vs (United States) Kid Glyde	(Netherlands) **Menno**	(Netherlands) **Menno**	(United States) Kid Glyde	(Netherlands) **Menno**	(Netherlands) **Menno**
(South Korea) **Differ** vs (Russia) Flying Buddha	TIE/ (South Korea) **Differ**	(Russia) Flying Buddha/ (South Korea) **Differ**	(Russia) Flying Buddha/ (South Korea) **Differ**	(South Korea) Differ/ (South Korea) **Differ**	(South Korea) Differ/ (South Korea) **Differ**
(United States) **Cloud** vs (Japan) Kaku	(United States) **Cloud**	(United States) **Cloud**	(United States) **Cloud**	(United States) **Cloud**	(United States) **Cloud**
(United States) **Morris** vs (Venezuela) Lil G	(United States) **Morris**	(Venezuela) Lil G	(United States) **Morris**	(United States) **Morris**	(United States) **Morris**
(South Korea) **Wing** vs (France) Punisher	(France) Punisher	(France) Punisher	(South Korea) **Wing**	(South Korea) **Wing**	(South Korea) **Wing**
(Germany) Lil Ceng vs (United States) **Thesis**	(United States) **Thesis**	(Germany) Lil Ceng	(United States) **Thesis**	(United States) **Thesis**	(United States) **Thesis**
(Ukraine) Kolobok vs (Algeria) **Lilou**	(Algeria) **Lilou**	(Algeria) **Lilou**	(Algeria) **Lilou**	(Algeria) **Lilou**	(Algeria) **Lilou**
(Brazil) **Neguin** vs (Netherlands) Menno	(Brazil) **Neguin**	(Brazil) **Neguin**	(Brazil) **Neguin**	(Brazil) **Neguin**	TIE
(South Korea) Differ vs (United States) **Cloud**	(United States) **Cloud**	(United States) **Cloud**	(United States) **Cloud**	(United States) **Cloud**	(United States) **Cloud**
(United States) **Morris** vs (South Korea) Wing	TIE/ (South Korea) Wing	TIE/ (United States) **Morris**	(United States) Morris/ (United States) **Morris**	(United States) Morris/ (United States) **Morris**	TIE/ (United States) **Morris**
(United States) Thesis vs (Algeria) **Lilou**	(Algeria) **Lilou**	(Algeria) **Lilou**	(Algeria) **Lilou**	TIE	TIE
(Brazil) Neguin vs (United States) **Cloud**	(United States) **Cloud**	(United States) **Cloud**	(United States) **Cloud**	(United States) **Cloud**	(United States) **Cloud**
(United States) Morris vs (Algeria) **Lilou**	(Algeria) **Lilou**	(Algeria) **Lilou**	(Algeria) **Lilou**	(Algeria) **Lilou**	(Algeria) **Lilou**
(United States) Cloud vs (Algeria) **Lilou**	(Algeria) **Lilou**	(United States) Cloud	(Algeria) **Lilou**	(United States) Cloud	(Algeria) **Lilou**

=== 2008 ===
For 2008, Red Bull BC One was held in Paris on November 5 at the new 104 Cent Quatre avenue.

Judges:

- (United States) Ivan (Style Elements)
- (Spain) Extremo (Addictos)
- (South Korea) Hong 10 (Drifterz)
- (France) Lilou (Pockemon Crew)
- (Germany) Storm (Battle Squad)

MC:

- (United States) Rakaa Iriscience (Dilated Peoples / Rock Steady Crew / Universal Zulu Nation)

DJ:

- (Japan) DJ Tee

==== B-boy World Final ====
Location: Paris, France

Red Bull BC One 2008 Bracket

Individuals in bold won their respective battles.

Round of 16
(Italy) **Cico**^{1}	**4**
(Netherlands) Niek^{2}	1
(Japan) **Taisuke**^{2}	**5**
(Venezuela) Lil G^{1}	0
(Germany) **Lil Ceng**^{2}	**3**
(United States) Kid David^{1}	2
(South Korea) Baek^{1}	2
(Brazil) **Pelezinho**^{2}	**3**
(South Korea) **Wing**^{2}	**4**
(South Africa) Benny^{1}	1
(Australia) Nasa^{1}	0
(France) **Mounir**^{2}	**5**
(Netherlands) **Menno**^{2}	**5**
(France) Lil Kev^{1}	0
(United States) Ronnie^{2}	2
(Ukraine) **Kolobok**^{1}	**3**

Quarter-finals
(Italy) Cico^{1}	0
(Japan) **Taisuke**^{2}	**5**
(Germany) **Lil Ceng**^{2}	**5**
(Brazil) Pelezinho^{1}	0
(South Korea) **Wing**^{2}	**4**
(France) Mounir^{1}	1
(Netherlands) Menno^{1}	2
(Ukraine) **Kolobok**^{2}	**3**

Semi-finals
(Japan) **Taisuke**^{1}	**4**
(Germany) Lil Ceng^{2}	1
(South Korea) **Wing**^{2}	**5**
(Ukraine) Kolobok^{1}	0

Final
(Japan) Taisuke^{1}	2
(South Korea) **Wing**^{2}	**3**
Third place

- ^{1} means they went first in the battle, ^{2} means they went second in the battle.

Judge Votes
Match	(South Korea) Hong 10	(Germany) Storm	(United States) Ivan	(Spain) Extremo	(France) Lilou
(Italy) **Cico** vs (Netherlands) Niek	(Italy) **Cico**	(Italy) **Cico**	(Italy) **Cico**	(Netherlands) Niek	(Italy) **Cico**
(Japan) **Taisuke** vs (Venezuela) Lil G	(Japan) **Taisuke**	(Japan) **Taisuke**	(Japan) **Taisuke**	(Japan) **Taisuke**	(Japan) **Taisuke**
(Germany) **Lil Ceng** vs (United States) Kid David	(United States) Kid David	(Germany) **Lil Ceng**	(Germany) **Lil Ceng**	(United States) Kid David	(Germany) **Lil Ceng**
(South Korea) Baek vs (Brazil) **Pelezinho**	(South Korea) Baek	(Brazil) **Pelezinho**	(South Korea) Baek	(Brazil) **Pelezinho**	(Brazil) **Pelezinho**
(South Korea) **Wing** vs (South Africa) Benny	(South Korea) **Wing**	(South Korea) **Wing**	(South Korea) **Wing**	(South Korea) **Wing**	(South Africa) Benny
(Australia) Nasa vs (France) **Mounir**	(France) **Mounir**	(France) **Mounir**	(France) **Mounir**	(France) **Mounir**	(France) **Mounir**
(Netherlands) **Menno** vs (France) Lil Kev	(Netherlands) **Menno**	(Netherlands) **Menno**	(Netherlands) **Menno**	(Netherlands) **Menno**	(Netherlands) **Menno**
(United States) Ronnie vs (Ukraine) **Kolobok**	(Ukraine) **Kolobok**	(United States) Ronnie	(United States) Ronnie	(Ukraine) **Kolobok**	(Ukraine) **Kolobok**
(Italy) Cico vs (Japan) **Taisuke**	(Japan) **Taisuke**	(Japan) **Taisuke**	(Japan) **Taisuke**	(Japan) **Taisuke**	(Japan) **Taisuke**
(Germany) **Lil Ceng** vs (Brazil) Pelezinho	(Germany) **Lil Ceng**	(Germany) **Lil Ceng**	(Germany) **Lil Ceng**	(Germany) **Lil Ceng**	(Germany) **Lil Ceng**
(South Korea) **Wing** vs (France) Mounir	(South Korea) **Wing**	(South Korea) **Wing**	(South Korea) **Wing**	(South Korea) **Wing**	(France) Mounir
(Netherlands) Menno vs **(Ukraine) Kolobok**	(Netherlands) Menno	(Netherlands) Menno	**(Ukraine) Kolobok**	**(Ukraine) Kolobok**	**(Ukraine) Kolobok**
(Japan) **Taisuke** vs (Germany) Lil Ceng	(Japan) **Taisuke**	(Japan) **Taisuke**	(Japan) **Taisuke**	(Japan) **Taisuke**	(Germany) Lil Ceng
(South Korea) **Wing** vs (Ukraine) Kolobok	(South Korea) **Wing**	(South Korea) **Wing**	(South Korea) **Wing**	(South Korea) **Wing**	(South Korea) **Wing**
(Japan) Taisuke vs (South Korea) **Wing**	(South Korea) **Wing**	(Japan) Taisuke	(South Korea) **Wing**	(South Korea) **Wing**	(Japan) Taisuke

=== 2007 ===
For 2007, qualifiers were held in May and June in 10 countries: Algeria, France, Japan, Germany, Brazil, South Africa, United States, Sweden, Taiwan, and Russia. The winner from each of these nine events, along with four wild card entries and the top 3 finishers from last year's 2006 main event, are the final 16 for the 2007 main event. However, two of the breakdancers – Baek ( (South Korea) ), a wild card selection, and Niek ( (Netherlands) ), who won the Germany qualifier – had to withdraw from the competition due to injury. They were replaced by B-boys Cico ( (Italy) ) and Jed.

Judges:

- (Germany) Speedy (Battle Squad)
- (South Africa) Emile (Black Noise)
- (Japan) Kazuhiro (King Ark)
- (United States) Kujo (Soul Control / Ill Abilities)
- (France) Salah (Vagabonds / Massive Monkees)

MC:

- (United States) Rakaa Iriscience (Dilated Peoples / Rock Steady Crew / Universal Zulu Nation)

DJ:

- (United Kingdom) DJ Renegade (Soul Mavericks)

==== B-boy World Final ====
Location: Johannesburg, South Africa

Red Bull BC One 2007 Bracket

Individuals in bold won their respective battles.

Round of 16
(South Korea) **Hong 10**^{1}	**W**
(Brazil) Daniel QDM^{2}	L
(United States) **Spee-D**^{1}	**W**
(Norway) Dark Marc^{2}	L
(Japan) **Taisuke**^{2}	**W**
(France) Sébastien^{1}	L
(United States) **Ronnie**^{2}	**W**
(Hong Kong) Drunk^{1}	L
(United States) **Roxrite** ^{1}	**W**
(Russia) Bootuz^{2}	L
(South Africa) Jed^{2}	L
(Italy) **Cico**^{1}	**W**
(Senegal) Ben-J^{2}	L
(France) **Lilou**^{1}	**W**
(South Africa) **Benny**^{2}	**W**
(United States) Twixx^{1}	L

Quarter-finals
(South Korea) **Hong 10**^{2}	**W**
(United States) Spee-D^{1}	L
(Japan) Taisuke^{1}	L
(United States) **Ronnie**^{2}	**W**
(United States) **Roxrite**^{2}	**W**
(Italy) Cico^{1}	L
(France) **Lilou**^{2}	**W**
(South Africa) Benny^{1}	L

Semi-finals
(South Korea) Hong 10^{1}	L
(United States) **Ronnie**^{2}	**W**
(United States) **Roxrite**^{2}	**W**
(France) Lilou^{1}	L

Final
(United States) **Ronnie**^{2}	**W**
(United States) Roxrite^{1}	L
Third place

- ^{1} means they went first in the battle, ^{2} means they went second in the battle.

=== 2006 ===
Judges:

- (Germany) Storm (Battle Squad)
- (United States) Rokafella (Full Circle Soul / Collective 7)
- (Brazil) Andrezinho (Discipulos do Ritmo)
- (Denmark) Sonic (Natural Effects)
- (France) Junior (Wanted Posse)

MC:

DJ:

==== B-boy World Final ====
Location: São Paulo, Brazil

Red Bull BC One 2006 Bracket

Individuals in bold won their respective battles.

Round of 16
(United States) Do Knock^{2}	2
(Japan) **Kaku**^{1}	**3**
(South Korea) **Hong 10**^{1}	**5**
(Germany) Lil Ceng^{2}	0
(France) Crazy Monkey^{2}	1
(Brazil) **Pelezinho**^{1}	**4**
(United States) **Roxrite**^{2}	**5**
(South Africa) Jed^{1}	0
(Brazil) **Muxibinha**^{1}	**W***
(France) Lilou^{2}	L*
(Venezuela) Salo^{2}	0
(South Korea) **The End**^{1}	**5**
(United Kingdom) **Mouse**^{2}	**W***
(Peru) Alex^{1}	L*
(United States) **Ronnie**^{2}	**4**
(Russia) Bootuz^{1}	1

Quarter-finals
(Japan) Kaku^{1}	0
(South Korea) **Hong 10**^{2}	**5**
(Brazil) Pelezinho^{2}	1*
(United States) **Roxrite**^{1}	**3***
(Brazil) Muxibinha^{1}	0
(South Korea) **The End**^{2}	**5**
(United Kingdom) Mouse^{1}	0
(United States) **Ronnie**^{2}	**5**

Semi-finals
(South Korea) **Hong 10**^{2}	**4**
(United States) Roxrite^{1}	1
(South Korea) The End^{1}	1
(United States) **Ronnie**^{2}	**4**

Final
(South Korea) **Hong 10**^{2}	**5**
(United States) Ronnie^{1}	0
Third place
(United States) **Roxrite**^{1}	**5**
(South Korea) The End^{2}	0

- ^{1} means they went first in the battle, ^{2} means they went second in the battle.

In the video for Muxibinha vs Lilou, 2 of the judges scorecards cannot be seen, but two judges can be seen voting for Muxibinha, and one can be seen voting for Lilou, so it was a split decision.

In the video for Mouse vs Alex, 3 of the judges scorecards cannot be seen, but two judges can be seen voting for Mouse, so it is unknown if it is a split decision.

In Pelezinho vs Roxrite, one of the judges voted TIE.

Judge Votes
Match	(United States) Rokafella	(France) Junior	(Germany) Storm	(Denmark) Sonic	(Brazil) Andrezinho
(United States) Do Knock vs (Japan) **Kaku**	(Japan) **Kaku**	(United States) Do Knock	(Japan) **Kaku**	(United States) Do Knock	(Japan) **Kaku**
(South Korea) **Hong 10** vs (Germany) Lil Ceng	(South Korea) **Hong 10**	(South Korea) **Hong 10**	(South Korea) **Hong 10**	(South Korea) **Hong 10**	(South Korea) **Hong 10**
(France) Crazy Monkey vs (Brazil) **Pelezinho**	(Brazil) **Pelezinho**	(France) Crazy Monkey	(Brazil) **Pelezinho**	(Brazil) **Pelezinho**	(Brazil) **Pelezinho**
(United States) **Roxrite** vs (South Africa) Jed	(United States) **Roxrite**	(United States) **Roxrite**	(United States) **Roxrite**	(United States) **Roxrite**	(United States) **Roxrite**
(Brazil) **Muxibinha** vs (France) Lilou	?	?	(Brazil) **Muxibinha**	(France) Lilou	(Brazil) **Muxibinha**
(Venezuela) Salo vs (South Korea) **The End**	(South Korea) **The End**	(South Korea) **The End**	(South Korea) **The End**	(South Korea) **The End**	(South Korea) **The End**
(United Kingdom) **Mouse** vs (Peru) Alex	?	?	?	(United Kingdom) **Mouse**	(United Kingdom) **Mouse**
(United States) **Ronnie** vs (Russia) Bootuz	(United States) **Ronnie**	(Russia) Bootuz	(United States) **Ronnie**	(United States) **Ronnie**	(United States) **Ronnie**
(Japan) Kaku vs (South Korea) **Hong 10**	(South Korea) **Hong 10**	(South Korea) **Hong 10**	(South Korea) **Hong 10**	(South Korea) **Hong 10**	(South Korea) **Hong 10**
(Brazil) Pelezinho vs (United States) **Roxrite**	(United States) **Roxrite**	(United States) **Roxrite**	(United States) **Roxrite**	(Brazil) Pelezinho	TIE
(Brazil) Muxibinha vs (South Korea) **The End**	(South Korea) **The End**	(South Korea) **The End**	(South Korea) **The End**	(South Korea) **The End**	(South Korea) **The End**
(United Kingdom) Mouse vs (United States) **Ronnie**	(United States) **Ronnie**	(United States) **Ronnie**	(United States) **Ronnie**	(United States) **Ronnie**	(United States) **Ronnie**
(South Korea) **Hong 10** vs (United States) Roxrite	(South Korea) **Hong 10**	(South Korea) **Hong 10**	(South Korea) **Hong 10**	(South Korea) **Hong 10**	(United States) Roxrite
(South Korea) The End vs (United States) **Ronnie**	(United States) **Ronnie**	(United States) **Ronnie**	(United States) **Ronnie**	(South Korea) The End	(United States) **Ronnie**
(United States) **Roxrite** vs (South Korea) The End	(United States) **Roxrite**	(United States) **Roxrite**	(United States) **Roxrite**	(United States) **Roxrite**	(United States) **Roxrite**
(South Korea) **Hong 10** vs (United States) Ronnie	(South Korea) **Hong 10**	(South Korea) **Hong 10**	(South Korea) **Hong 10**	(South Korea) **Hong 10**	(South Korea) **Hong 10**

=== 2005 ===
Judges:

- (United States) Asia One (Rock Steady Crew)
- (South Korea) Ducky (Drifterz / Project Seoul)
- (France) David Colas (Compagnie Phorm)
- (United States) Poe One (Rock So Fresh / Style Elements / Mighty Zulu Kingz)
- (Germany) Storm (Battle Squad)

MC:

- (United States) Rahzel (former member of The Roots)

DJ:

- DJ Ace and DJ Billy Brown

==== B-boy World Final ====
Location: Berlin, Germany

Red Bull BC One 2005 Bracket

Individuals in bold won their respective battles.

Round of 16
(France) **Lilou**^{1}	**3**
(South Korea) Physicx^{2}	2
(United States) **Omar**^{2}	**5**
(South Africa) Benny^{1}	0
(Russia) Jora^{1}	0
(France) **Junior**^{2}	**5**
(South Korea) Born^{1}	1
(United States) **Ronnie**^{2}	**4**
(United States) Moy^{2}	0
(South Korea) **Hong 10**^{1}	**5**
(France) Brahim^{1}	0
(United States) **Machine**^{2}	**5**
(Italy) Cico^{1}	2
(Brazil) **Pelezinho**^{2}	**3**
(Germany) Rubber Legz^{1}	0*
(Denmark) **Sonic**^{2}	**4***

Quarter-finals
(France) **Lilou**^{2}	**3***
(United States) Omar^{1}	1*
(France) Junior^{1}	2
(United States) **Ronnie**^{2}	**3**
(South Korea) **Hong 10**^{2}	**3***
(United States) Machine^{1}	0*
(Brazil) **Pelezinho**^{2}	**3***
(Denmark) Sonic^{1}	1*

Semi-finals
(France) **Lilou**^{1}	**5**
(United States) Ronnie^{2}	0
(South Korea) **Hong 10**^{1}	**4**
(Brazil) Pelezinho^{2}	1

Final
(France) **Lilou**^{2}	**3***
(South Korea) Hong 10^{1}	0*
Third place
(United States) **Ronnie**^{2}	**4**
(Brazil) Pelezinho^{1}	1

- ^{1} means they went first in the battle, ^{2} means they went second in the battle.

In Jora vs Junior and Ronnie vs Pelezinho the fifth judges vote wasn't shown.

In Rubber Legz vs Sonic, the fourth judges vote wasn't shown.

In Lilou vs Omar and Pelezinho vs Sonic, one of the judges voted TIE.

In Hong 10 vs Machine and Lilou vs Hong 10 the fourth and fifth judges votes weren't shown.

Match	(South Korea) Ducky	(United States) Poe One	(France) David Colas	(Germany) Storm	(United States) Asia One
(France) **Lilou** vs (South Korea) Physicx	(South Korea) Physicx	(France) **Lilou**	(France) **Lilou**	(South Korea) Physicx	(France) **Lilou**
(United States) **Omar** vs (South Africa) Benny	(United States) **Omar**	(United States) **Omar**	(United States) **Omar**	(United States) **Omar**	(United States) **Omar**
(Russia) Jora vs (France) **Junior**	(France) **Junior**	(France) **Junior**	(France) **Junior**	(France) **Junior**	(France) **Junior**
(South Korea) Born vs (United States) **Ronnie**	(United States) **Ronnie**	(United States) **Ronnie**	(United States) **Ronnie**	(United States) **Ronnie**	(South Korea) Born
(United States) Moy vs (South Korea) **Hong 10**	(South Korea) **Hong 10**	(South Korea) **Hong 10**	(South Korea) **Hong 10**	(South Korea) **Hong 10**	(South Korea) **Hong 10**
(France) Brahim vs (United States) **Machine**	(United States) **Machine**	(United States) **Machine**	(United States) **Machine**	(United States) **Machine**	(United States) **Machine**
(Italy) Cico vs (Brazil) **Pelezinho**	(Italy) Cico	(Brazil) **Pelezinho**	(Brazil) **Pelezinho**	(Italy) Cico	(Brazil) **Pelezinho**
(Germany) Rubber Legz vs (Denmark) **Sonic**	(Denmark) **Sonic**	(Denmark) **Sonic**	(Denmark) **Sonic**	(Denmark) **Sonic**	?
(France) **Lilou** vs (United States) Omar	(France) **Lilou**	(United States) Omar	(France) **Lilou**	(France) **Lilou**	TIE
(France) Junior vs **(United States) Ronnie**	(United States) **Ronnie**	(United States) **Ronnie**	(France) Junior	(France) Junior	(United States) **Ronnie**
(South Korea) **Hong 10** vs (United States) Machine	(South Korea) **Hong 10**	(South Korea) **Hong 10**	(South Korea) **Hong 10**	?	?
(Brazil) **Pelezinho** vs (Denmark) Sonic	TIE	(Brazil) **Pelezinho**	(Brazil) **Pelezinho**	(Brazil) **Pelezinho**	(Denmark) Sonic
(France) **Lilou** vs (United States) Ronnie	(France) **Lilou**	(France) **Lilou**	(France) **Lilou**	(France) **Lilou**	(France) **Lilou**
(South Korea) **Hong 10** vs (Brazil) Pelezinho	(South Korea) **Hong 10**	(South Korea) **Hong 10**	(South Korea) **Hong 10**	(South Korea) **Hong 10**	(Brazil) Pelezinho
**(United States) Ronnie** vs (Brazil) Pelezinho	**(United States) Ronnie**	**(United States) Ronnie**	**(United States) Ronnie**	**(United States) Ronnie**	(Brazil) Pelezinho
(France) **Lilou** vs (South Korea) Hong 10	?	(France) **Lilou**	(France) **Lilou**	?	(France) **Lilou**

=== 2004 ===
Judges:

- (Germany) Benny (Flying Steps)
- (France) Lamine (Vagabonds)
- (Australia) George (Wickid Force)
- (United States) Asia One (Rock Steady Crew)
- (Switzerland) Tuff Kid (Basel City Attack)

MC:

- (United States) Rahzel (former member of The Roots)

DJ:

- (United Kingdom) DJ Supreme

==== B-boy World Final ====
Location: Biel, Switzerland

Red Bull BC One 2004 Bracket

Individuals in bold won their respective battles.

Round of 16
(Germany) Leo^{2}	1
(United States) **Bebe**^{1}	**4**
(Denmark) **Sonic**^{1}	**5**
(Germany) KC^{2}	0
(Spain) Extremo^{1}	0*
(United States) **Omar**^{2}	**3***
(France) **By**^{1}	**5**
(United Kingdom) Lil' Tim^{2}	0
(United States) **Ronnie**^{1}	**5**
(Japan) Kousuke^{2}	0
(South Korea) Eagle^{2}	2
(United States) **Iron Monkey**^{1}	**3**
(South Korea) **Wake Up**^{2}	**4***
(Australia) Wongo^{1}	0*
(France) **Junior**^{2}	**4***
(Switzerland) Nuno^{1}	0*

Quarter-finals
(United States) Bebe^{2}	0*
(Denmark) **Sonic** ^{1}	**3***
(United States) **Omar**^{1}	**3**
(France) By^{2}	2
(United States) **Ronnie**^{1}	**4**
(United States) Iron Monkey^{2}	1
(South Korea) Wake Up^{1}	0*
(France) **Junior**^{2}	**3***

Semi-finals
(Denmark) Sonic^{1}	0
(United States) **Omar**^{2}	**5**
(United States) **Ronnie**^{2}	**3**
(France) Junior^{1}	2

Final
(United States) **Omar**^{1}	**W**
(United States) Ronnie^{2}	L
Third place
(Denmark) Sonic^{1}	1
(France) **Junior**^{2}	**4**

- ^{1} means they went first in the battle, ^{2} means they went second in the battle.

In the video for Extremo vs Omar, Bebe vs Sonic and Wake Up vs Junior, two judges votes weren't shown.

In the videos for Wake Up vs Wongo and Junior vs Nuno, one judges vote wasn't shown.

== Red Bull BC One All Stars ==
Red Bull BC One All Stars is a Red Bull sponsored crew of dancers composed of former Red Bull BC One competitors. Members of the crew travel internationally, teaching workshops, judging competitions and battling together.

Some notable achievements are the following:

- Winner of 2v2 Battle at Outbreak Europe 2015 (Roxrite & Menno)
- Winner of 3v3 Battle at Renegade Rockers 32nd Anniversary 2015 (Roxrite, Neguin, Menno)
- Winner of Crew Battle at UK B-Boy Championships 2016
- Winner of 3v3 Need For Dance 2017 (Lil G, Hong 10, Menno)
- Winner of 2v2 Battle De Vaulx 2017 (Menno & Wing)
- Winner of 3v3 Battle at Floorlords 36th Anniversary 2017 (Roxrite, Victor, Menno)
- Winner of Seven All Star 2 Smoke at The Notorious IBE 2017
- Winner of 2v2 LCB "Choose Your Destiny" 2017 (Taisuke & Issei)
- Winner of 3v3 Undisputed 2018 (Roxrite, Neguin, Victor)
- Winner of Crew vs Crew Circle Industry 2018 (Roxrite, Taisuke, Victor, Menno, Junior)
- Winner of 3v3 HIP OPsession 2018 (Hong 10, Wing, Ronnie)
- Winner of Crew Battle Legits Blast Winter 2018
- Winner of 4v4 SCAPE Radikal Forze Jam 2018 (Victor, Wing, Menno)
- Winner of 2v2 Battle De Vaulx 2018 (Victor & Roxrite)
- Winner of 2v2 Freestyle Session 2018 (Hong 10 & Wing)
- Winner of 3v3 United Styles 2019 (Hong 10, Menno, Neguin)
- Winner of 5v5 Checkmate - Circle Industry (Ronnie, Neguin, Menno, Lil Zoo, Ami)
- Winner of 4v4 Bucheon Bboy International Festival (Hong 10, Taisuke, Lil Zoo, Sunni)
- Winner of 3v3 Freestyle Session 2019 (Menno, Victor, Lil G)

Member	Crewbase
(United States) **Roxrite**	Renegade Rockers / Squadron
(Brazil) Pelezinho (Former)	Tsunami All-Stars
(Italy) Cico (Former)	Spinkingz
(South Korea) **Hong 10**	FlowXL
(United States) **Ronnie**	Full Force / Super Cr3w
(Japan) Taisuke	Flooriorz
(France) **Lilou**	Pockemon Crew
(Brazil) **Neguin**	Tsunami All-Stars
(Venezuela) Lil G	Speedy Angels / Team Vinotinto
(South Korea) **Wing (Former)**	Jinjo Crew
(Netherlands) **Menno**	Hustle Kidz
(United States) **Victor**	Squadron / MF Kidz
(Japan) **Issei (Former)**	Foundnation
(France) Junior	Wanted Posse
(Japan) **Ami**	Good Foot Crew
(Austria) **Lil Zoo (Former)**	El Mouwahidin / Flying Steps
(United Kingdom) Sunni	Soul Mavericks
(United States) **Logistix**	BreakinMIA / Underground Flow / Motiv
(Japan) **Shigekix**	XII After Ours
(Russia) **Kastet**	3:16
(Canada) Phil Wizard	United Rivals
(Netherlands) Lee	The Ruggeds
(Lithuania) Nicka	inDaMotion Crew
(Japan) Issin	Body Carnival

Breaker in Bold denotes former Red Bull BC One champion.
