= Breaking at the 2024 Summer Olympics – B-Boys =

Breakdancing competition, 2024 Olympics

Breaking – B-Boys at the Games of the XXXIII Olympiad
- Venue: Place de la Concorde 1
- Date: 10 August 2024
- Competitors: 16

Medalists
| 1st place, gold medalist(s) | | Philip Kim (Phil Wizard) | Canada |
| 2nd place, silver medalist(s) | | Danis Civil (Dany Dann) | France |
| 3rd place, bronze medalist(s) | | Victor Montalvo (Victor) | United States |

The B-Boys breaking competition at the 2024 Summer Olympics took place on 10 August 2024.

Philip Kim (Phil Wizard) of Canada won the gold medal, with Danis Civil (Dany Dann) of France taking silver, and Victor Montalvo (Victor) of the United States taking bronze.

== Pre-seeding ==
Pre-seeding was based on the WDSF World Ranking as of January 1, 2024.

1. Shigeyuki Nakarai (Shigekix) (JPN) (semifinals, fourth place)
2. Philip Kim (Phil Wizard) (CAN) (champion, gold medalist)
3. Jeffrey Louis (Jeffro) (USA) (quarterfinals)
4. Amir Zakirov (Amir) (KAZ) (quarterfinals)
5. Menno van Gorp (Menno) (NED) (quarterfinals)
6. Gaëtan Alin (Lagaet) (FRA) (group stage)
7. Danis Civil (Dany Dann) (FRA) (final, silver medalist)
8. Victor Montalvo (Victor) (USA) (semifinals, bronze medalist)
9. Hiroto Ono (Hiro10) (JPN) (group stage)
10. Oleg Kuznietsov (Kuzya) (UKR) (group stage)
11. Lee-Lou Demierre (Lee) (NED) (quarterfinals)
12. Bilal Mallakh (Billy) (MAR) (group stage)
13. Sun Chen (Quake) (TPE) (group stage)
14. Kim Hong-yul (Hongten) (KOR) (group stage)
15. Jeffrey Dunne (J Attack) (AUS) (group stage)
16. Qi Xiangyu (Lithe-ing) (CHN) (group stage)

== Results ==
=== Group stage ===
==== Group A ====
| Rank | Breaker (seed) | Nickname | Nation | Rounds | Votes | Notes |
|---|---|---|---|---|---|---|
| 1 | Victor Montalvo (8) | Victor | United States | 5 | 35 | Q |
| 2 | Shigeyuki Nakarai (1) | Shigekix | Japan | 4 | 38 | Q |
| 3 | Qi Xiangyu (16) | Lithe-ing | China | 3 | 27 | |
| 4 | Hiroto Ono (9) | Hiro10 | Japan | 0 | 8 | |

| Red Side | Score | Blue Side | Round 1 | Round 2 | Total Votes | Report |
|---|---|---|---|---|---|---|
| Shigekix (JPN) | 1-1 | Victor (USA) | 8-1 | 4-5 | 12-6 | Report |
| Lithe-ing (CHN) | 2-0 | Hiro10 (JPN) | 9-0 | 6-3 | 15-3 | Report |
| Shigekix (JPN) | 2-0 | Hiro10 (JPN) | 9-0 | 8-1 | 17-1 | Report |
| Victor (USA) | 2-0 | Lithe-ing (CHN) | 6-3 | 9-0 | 15-3 | Report |
| Lithe-ing (CHN) | 1-1 | Shigekix (JPN) | 0-9 | 9-0 | 9-9 | Report |
| Hiro10 (JPN) | 0-2 | Victor (USA) | 1-8 | 3-6 | 4-14 | Report |

==== Group B ====
| Rank | Breaker (seed) | Nickname | Nation | Rounds | Votes | Notes |
|---|---|---|---|---|---|---|
| 1 | Philip Kim (2) | Phil Wizard | Canada | 5 | 40 | Q |
| 2 | Danis Civil (7) | Dany Dann | France | 4 | 37 | Q |
| 3 | Oleg Kuznietsov (10) | Kuzya | Ukraine | 3 | 29 | |
| 4 | Jeffrey Dunne (15) | J Attack | Australia | 0 | 2 | |

| Red Side | Score | Blue Side | Round 1 | Round 2 | Total Votes | Report |
|---|---|---|---|---|---|---|
| Phil Wizard (CAN) | 2-0 | Dany Dann (FRA) | 8-1 | 5-4 | 13-5 | Report |
| J Attack (AUS) | 0-2 | Kuzya (UKR) | 1-8 | 0-9 | 1-17 | Report |
| Phil Wizard (CAN) | 1-1 | Kuzya (UKR) | 3-6 | 7-2 | 10-8 | Report |
| Dany Dann (FRA) | 2-0 | J Attack (AUS) | 9-0 | 9-0 | 18-0 | Report |
| J Attack (AUS) | 0-2 | Phil Wizard (CAN) | 0-9 | 1-8 | 1-17 | Report |
| Kuzya (UKR) | 0-2 | Dany Dann (FRA) | 2-7 | 2-7 | 4-14 | Report |

==== Group C ====
| Rank | Breaker (seed) | Nickname | Nation | Rounds | Votes | Notes |
|---|---|---|---|---|---|---|
| 1 | Jeffrey Louis (3) | Jeffro | United States | 5 | 37 | Q |
| 2 | Lee-Lou Demierre (11) | Lee | Netherlands | 4 | 29 | Q |
| 3 | Kim Hong-yul (14) | Hongten | South Korea | 2 | 27 | |
| 4 | Gaëtan Alin (6) | Lagaet | France | 1 | 15 | |

| Red Side | Score | Blue Side | Round 1 | Round 2 | Total Votes | Report |
|---|---|---|---|---|---|---|
| Jeffro (USA) | 2-0 | Lagaet (FRA) | 6-3 | 8-1 | 14-4 | Report |
| Hongten (KOR) | 0-2 | Lee (NED) | 2-7 | 3-6 | 5-13 | Report |
| Jeffro (USA) | 2-0 | Lee (NED) | 9-0 | 7-2 | 16-2 | Report |
| Lagaet (FRA) | 1-1 | Hongten (KOR) | 2-7 | 5-4 | 7-11 | Report |
| Hongten (KOR) | 1-1 | Jeffro (USA) | 3-6 | 8-1 | 11-7 | Report |
| Lee (NED) | 2-0 | Lagaet (FRA) | 6-3 | 8-1 | 14-4 | Report |

==== Group D ====
| Rank | Breaker (seed) | Nickname | Nation | Rounds | Votes | Notes |
|---|---|---|---|---|---|---|
| 1 | Menno van Gorp (5) | Menno | Netherlands | 6 | 49 | Q |
| 2 | Amir Zakirov (4) | Amir | Kazakhstan | 4 | 29 | Q |
| 3 | Sun Chen (13) | Quake | Chinese Taipei | 2 | 26 | |
| 4 | Bilal Mallakh (12) | Billy | Morocco | 0 | 4 | |

| Red Side | Score | Blue Side | Round 1 | Round 2 | Total Votes | Report |
|---|---|---|---|---|---|---|
| Amir (KAZ) | 0-2 | Menno (NED) | 1-8 | 0-9 | 1-17 | Report |
| Quake (TPE) | 2-0 | Billy (MAR) | 9-0 | 9-0 | 18-0 | Report |
| Amir (KAZ) | 2-0 | Billy (MAR) | 7-2 | 8-1 | 15-3 | Report |
| Menno (NED) | 2-0 | Quake (TPE) | 6-3 | 9-0 | 15-3 | Report |
| Quake (TPE) | 0-2 | Amir (KAZ) | 3-6 | 2-7 | 5-13 | Report |
| Billy (MAR) | 0-2 | Menno (NED) | 1-8 | 0-9 | 1-17 | Report |

=== Bracket ===
Quarterfinals
Dany Dann (FRA) | 3 | 5 | 6
Jeffro (USA) | 6 | 4 | 3
Amir (KAZ) | 0 | 1 | 2
Victor (USA) | 9 | 8 | 7
Shigekix (JPN) | 9 | 6 | 7
Menno (NED) | 0 | 3 | 2
Lee (NED) | 1 | 4 | 3
Phil Wizard (CAN) | 8 | 5 | 6

Semifinals
Dany Dann (FRA) | 6 | 6 | 3
Victor (USA) | 3 | 3 | 6
Shigekix (JPN) | 4 | 3 | 3
Phil Wizard (CAN) | 5 | 6 | 6

Gold medal battle
Dany Dann (FRA) (silver) | 4 | 0 | 0
Phil Wizard (CAN) (gold) | 5 | 9 | 9
Bronze medal battle
Victor (USA) (bronze) | 9 | 5 | 6
Shigekix (JPN) | 0 | 4 | 3

Judge Votes
| Battle | Kazuhiro (Japan) | Frost (Germany) | Moy (United States) | Migaz (Brazil) | Jess (Spain) | Kowloon (China) | Virus (South Korea) | Dom:k (France) | Intact (Ukraine) |
|---|---|---|---|---|---|---|---|---|---|
| Dany Dann (France) vs Jeffro (United States) | Jeffro (United States) /Jeffro (United States) /Jeffro (United States) | Dany Dann (France) /Jeffro (United States) /Dany Dann (France) | Jeffro (United States) /Dany Dann (France) /Dany Dann (France) | Jeffro (United States) /Dany Dann (France) /Jeffro (United States) | Jeffro (United States) /Dany Dann (France) /Dany Dann (France) | Dany Dann (France) /Dany Dann (France) /Jeffro (United States) | Jeffro (United States) /Dany Dann (France) /Dany Dann (France) | Dany Dann (France) /Jeffro (United States) /Dany Dann (France) | Jeffro (United States) /Jeffro (United States) /Dany Dann (France) |
| Amir (Kazakhstan) vs Victor (United States) | Victor (United States) /Victor (United States) /Amir (Kazakhstan) | Victor (United States) /Victor (United States) /Victor (United States) | Victor (United States) /Victor (United States) /Victor (United States) | Victor (United States) /Amir (Kazakhstan) /Victor (United States) | Victor (United States) /Victor (United States) /Victor (United States) | Victor (United States) /Victor (United States) /Victor (United States) | Victor (United States) /Victor (United States) /Amir (Kazakhstan) | Victor (United States) /Victor (United States) /Victor (United States) | Victor (United States) /Victor (United States) /Victor (United States) |
| Shigekix (Japan) vs Menno (Netherlands) | Shigekix (Japan) /Shigekix (Japan) /Shigekix (Japan) | Shigekix (Japan) /Menno (Netherlands) /Shigekix (Japan) | Shigekix (Japan) /Shigekix (Japan) /Shigekix (Japan) | Shigekix (Japan) /Menno (Netherlands) /Shigekix (Japan) | Shigekix (Japan) /Shigekix (Japan) /Shigekix (Japan) | Shigekix (Japan) /Shigekix (Japan) /Menno (Netherlands) | Shigekix (Japan) /Shigekix (Japan) /Shigekix (Japan) | Shigekix (Japan) /Shigekix (Japan) /Shigekix (Japan) | Shigekix (Japan) /Menno (Netherlands) /Menno (Netherlands) |
| Lee (Netherlands) vs Phil Wizard (Canada) | Phil Wizard (Canada) /Lee (Netherlands) /Lee (Netherlands) | Phil Wizard (Canada) /Phil Wizard (Canada) /Phil Wizard (Canada) | Phil Wizard (Canada) /Phil Wizard (Canada) /Phil Wizard (Canada) | Phil Wizard (Canada) /Lee (Netherlands) /Phil Wizard (Canada) | Phil Wizard (Canada) /Phil Wizard (Canada) /Phil Wizard (Canada) | Phil Wizard (Canada) /Phil Wizard (Canada) /Phil Wizard (Canada) | Lee (Netherlands) /Lee (Netherlands) /Lee (Netherlands) | Phil Wizard (Canada) /Lee (Netherlands) /Lee (Netherlands) | Phil Wizard (Canada) /Phil Wizard (Canada) /Phil Wizard (Canada) |
| Dany Dann (France) vs Victor (United States) | Dany Dann (France) /Victor (United States) /Victor (United States) | Dany Dann (France) /Dany Dann (France) /Dany Dann (France) | Dany Dann (France) /Victor (United States) /Dany Dann (France) | Victor (United States) /Dany Dann (France) /Dany Dann (France) | Victor (United States) /Dany Dann (France) /Victor (United States) | Dany Dann (France) /Victor (United States) /Victor (United States) | Dany Dann (France) /Dany Dann (France) /Victor (United States) | Dany Dann (France) /Dany Dann (France) /Victor (United States) | Victor (United States) /Dany Dann (France) /Victor (United States) |
| Shigekix (Japan) vs Phil Wizard (Canada) | Phil Wizard (Canada) /Shigekix (Japan) /Phil Wizard (Canada) | Shigekix (Japan) /Phil Wizard (Canada) /Phil Wizard (Canada) | Shigekix (Japan) /Phil Wizard (Canada) /Shigekix (Japan) | Phil Wizard (Canada) /Phil Wizard (Canada) /Shigekix (Japan) | Phil Wizard (Canada) /Phil Wizard (Canada) /Phil Wizard (Canada) | Phil Wizard (Canada) /Phil Wizard (Canada) /Shigekix (Japan) | Phil Wizard (Canada) /Phil Wizard (Canada) /Phil Wizard (Canada) | Shigekix (Japan) /Shigekix (Japan) /Phil Wizard (Canada) | Shigekix (Japan) /Shigekix (Japan) /Phil Wizard (Canada) |
| Victor (United States) vs Shigekix (Japan) | Victor (United States) /Shigekix (Japan) /Shigekix (Japan) | Victor (United States) /Shigekix (Japan) /Victor (United States) | Victor (United States) /Victor (United States) /Victor (United States) | Victor (United States) /Victor (United States) /Shigekix (Japan) | Victor (United States) /Victor (United States) /Victor (United States) | Victor (United States) /Shigekix (Japan) /Victor (United States) | Victor (United States) /Shigekix (Japan) /Shigekix (Japan) | Victor (United States) /Victor (United States) /Victor (United States) | Victor (United States) /Victor (United States) /Victor (United States) |
| Dany Dann (France) vs Phil Wizard (Canada) | Phil Wizard (Canada) /Phil Wizard (Canada) /Phil Wizard (Canada) | Dany Dann (France) /Phil Wizard (Canada) /Phil Wizard (Canada) | Phil Wizard (Canada) /Phil Wizard (Canada) /Phil Wizard (Canada) | Phil Wizard (Canada) /Phil Wizard (Canada) /Phil Wizard (Canada) | Dany Dann (France) /Phil Wizard (Canada) /Phil Wizard (Canada) | Phil Wizard (Canada) /Phil Wizard (Canada) /Phil Wizard (Canada) | Phil Wizard (Canada) /Phil Wizard (Canada) /Phil Wizard (Canada) | Dany Dann (France) /Phil Wizard (Canada) /Phil Wizard (Canada) | Dany Dann (France) /Phil Wizard (Canada) /Phil Wizard (Canada) |

== Final standing ==
| Rank | Athlete | Nickname |
|---|---|---|
| 1st place, gold medalist(s) | Philip Kim (CAN) | Phil Wizard |
| 2nd place, silver medalist(s) | Danis Civil (FRA) | Dany Dann |
| 3rd place, bronze medalist(s) | Victor Montalvo (USA) | Victor |
| 4 | Shigeyuki Nakarai (JPN) | Shigekix |
| 5 | Jeffrey Louis (USA) | Jeffro |
| 6 | Lee-Lou Demierre (NED) | Lee |
| 7 | Menno van Gorp (NED) | Menno |
| 8 | Amir Zakirov (KAZ) | Amir |
| 9 | Oleg Kuznietsov (UKR) | Kuzya |
| 10 | Qi Xiangyu (CHN) | Lithe-ing |
| 11 | Kim Hong-yul (KOR) | Hongten |
| 12 | Sun Chen (TPE) | Quake |
| 13 | Gaëtan Alin (FRA) | Lagaet |
| 14 | Hiroto Ono (JPN) | Hiro10 |
| 15 | Bilal Mallakh (MAR) | Billy |
| 16 | Jeffrey Dunne (AUS) | J Attack |
