= Breaking at the 2022 Asian Games – B-Boys =

B-Boys at the 2022 Asian Games
- Venue: Gongshu Canal Sports Park Gymnasium
- Date: 6–7 October 2023
- Competitors: 25 from 13 nations

Medalists
gold medal	Shigeyuki Nakarai	Japan
silver medal	Kim Hong-yul	South Korea
bronze medal	Qi Xiangyu	China

The B-Boys` breaking event at the 2022 Asian Games was held in Gongshu Canal Sports Park Gymnasium, Hangzhou from 6 to 7 October 2023.

== Schedule ==
All times are China Standard Time (UTC+08:00)

Date	Time	Event
Friday, 6 October 2023	14:30	Pre-selection
Friday, 6 October 2023	16:15	Round robin
Saturday, 7 October 2023	18:00	Knockouts
Saturday, 7 October 2023	19:20	Semifinals
Saturday, 7 October 2023	20:00	Finals

== Results ==
=== Pre-selection ===
Rank	Athlete	Score
1	Qi Xiangyu (CHN)	781.8
2	Sun Chen (TPE)	740.8
3	Isshin Hishikawa (JPN)	738.8
4	Shang Xiaoyu (CHN)	724.5
5	Amir Zakirov (KAZ)	724.4
6	Shigeyuki Nakarai (JPN)	721.1
7	Kim Heon-woo (KOR)	697.3
8	Kim Hong-yul (KOR)	690.2
9	Jamal Asadulaev (UZB)	684.0
10	Talgat Sherov (UZB)	618.8
11	Sze Ka Yam (HKG)	614.5
12	Hà Thanh Tùng (VIE)	614.0
13	Daulet Anarbekuly (KAZ)	611.7
14	Liu Cheng-te (TPE)	607.4
15	Kantapon Rodsaart (THA)	561.9
16	Chinavut Chantarat (THA)	553.7
17	Lục Đỗ Tấn Khoa (VIE)	552.6
18	Tsang Tsz Wa (HKG)	534.1
19	Ganbaltyn Gan-Ölzii (MGL)	528.0
20	Chuluunbaataryn Dölgöön (MGL)	487.0
21	Ilyvm Gabriel (PHI)	462.3
22	Nico Ronald Ruadap (PHI)	354.0
23	Deepak Lama (NEP)	347.7
24	Sadriddin Dorobshokhi (TJK)	309.3
25	Firdavs Dzhuraev (TJK)	294.9

=== Round robin ===
==== Group A ====
Pos	Athlete	Pld	W	D	L	Rnd	V	Qualification
1	Qi Xiangyu (CHN)	3	3	0	0	6	46	Knockouts
2	Kim Hong-yul (KOR)	3	2	0	1	4	42	Knockouts
3	Jamal Asadulaev (UZB)	3	1	0	2	2	12	
4	Chinavut Chantarat (THA)	3	0	0	3	0	8	

Source: WDSF

	Score		Rnd 1	Rnd 2
Kim Hong-yul (KOR)	0–2	Qi Xiangyu (CHN)	4–5	2–7
Jamal Asadulaev (UZB)	2–0	Chinavut Chantarat (THA)	5–4	6–3
Qi Xiangyu (CHN)	2–0	Jamal Asadulaev (UZB)	9–0	8–1
Chinavut Chantarat (THA)	0–2	Kim Hong-yul (KOR)	0–9	0–9
Chinavut Chantarat (THA)	0–2	Qi Xiangyu (CHN)	0–9	1–8
Jamal Asadulaev (UZB)	0–2	Kim Hong-yul (KOR)	0–9	0–9

==== Group B ====
Pos	Athlete	Pld	W	D	L	Rnd	V	Qualification
1	Kim Heon-woo (KOR)	3	3	0	0	6	50	Knockouts
2	Sun Chen (TPE)	3	2	0	1	4	35	Knockouts
3	Kantapon Rodsaart (THA)	3	0	1	2	1	12	
4	Talgat Sherov (UZB)	3	0	1	2	1	11	

Source: WDSF

	Score		Rnd 1	Rnd 2
Sun Chen (TPE)	0–2	Kim Heon-woo (KOR)	2–7	1–8
Kantapon Rodsaart (THA)	1–1	Talgat Sherov (UZB)	2–7	5–4
Sun Chen (TPE)	2–0	Talgat Sherov (UZB)	9–0	9–0
Kim Heon-woo (KOR)	2–0	Kantapon Rodsaart (THA)	9–0	8–1
Kantapon Rodsaart (THA)	0–2	Sun Chen (TPE)	3–6	1–8
Talgat Sherov (UZB)	0–2	Kim Heon-woo (KOR)	0–9	0–9

==== Group C ====
Pos	Athlete	Pld	W	D	L	Rnd	V	Qualification
1	Shigeyuki Nakarai (JPN)	3	2	1	0	5	47	Knockouts
2	Isshin Hishikawa (JPN)	3	2	1	0	5	42	Knockouts
3	Liu Cheng-te (TPE)	3	1	0	2	2	15	
4	Sze Ka Yam (HKG)	3	0	0	3	0	4	

Source: WDSF

	Score		Rnd 1	Rnd 2
Shigeyuki Nakarai (JPN)	1–1	Isshin Hishikawa (JPN)	4–5	7–2
Sze Ka Yam (HKG)	0–2	Liu Cheng-te (TPE)	1–8	3–6
Isshin Hishikawa (JPN)	2–0	Sze Ka Yam (HKG)	9–0	9–0
Liu Cheng-te (TPE)	0–2	Shigeyuki Nakarai (JPN)	0–9	0–9
Liu Cheng-te (TPE)	0–2	Isshin Hishikawa (JPN)	1–8	0–9
Shigeyuki Nakarai (JPN)	2–0	Sze Ka Yam (HKG)	9–0	9–0

==== Group D ====
Pos	Athlete	Pld	W	D	L	Rnd	V	Qualification
1	Amir Zakirov (KAZ)	3	3	0	0	6	47	Knockouts
2	Shang Xiaoyu (CHN)	3	2	0	1	4	36	Knockouts
3	Daulet Anarbekuly (KAZ)	3	1	0	2	2	23	
4	Hà Thanh Tùng (VIE)	3	0	0	3	0	2	

Source: WDSF

	Score		Rnd 1	Rnd 2
Amir Zakirov (KAZ)	2–0	Shang Xiaoyu (CHN)	5–4	8–1
Daulet Anarbekuly (KAZ)	2–0	Hà Thanh Tùng (VIE)	9–0	8–1
Hà Thanh Tùng (VIE)	0–2	Shang Xiaoyu (CHN)	1–8	0–9
Amir Zakirov (KAZ)	2–0	Daulet Anarbekuly (KAZ)	7–2	9–0
Shang Xiaoyu (CHN)	2–0	Daulet Anarbekuly (KAZ)	5–4	9–0
Amir Zakirov (KAZ)	2–0	Hà Thanh Tùng (VIE)	9–0	9–0

=== Knockout round ===
Knockouts
C1	Shigeyuki Nakarai (JPN)	7	3	9
B2	Sun Chen (TPE)	2	6	0
D2	Shang Xiaoyu (CHN)	6	1	0
A1	Qi Xiangyu (CHN)	3	8	9
A2	Kim Hong-yul (KOR)	5	7
D1	Amir Zakirov (KAZ)	4	2
B1	Kim Heon-woo (KOR)	4	3
C2	Isshin Hishikawa (JPN)	5	6

Semifinals
C1	Shigeyuki Nakarai (JPN)	8	5	5
A1	Qi Xiangyu (CHN)	1	4	4
A2	Kim Hong-yul (KOR)	6	6	9
C2	Isshin Hishikawa (JPN)	3	3	0

Gold medal battle
C1	Shigeyuki Nakarai (JPN)	5	6	3
A2	Kim Hong-yul (KOR)	4	3	6
Bronze medal battle
A1	Qi Xiangyu (CHN)	6	4	8
C2	Isshin Hishikawa (JPN)	3	5	1
