= Breaking at the 2026 Asian Games – B-Boys =

B-Boys at the 2026 Asian Games
- Venue: Aichi International Exhibition Center
- Date: 2–3 October 2026
- Competitors: 19 from 10 nations

Medalists
gold medal	Shigeyuki Nakarai	Japan
silver medal	Kim Hong-yul	South Korea
bronze medal	Wang Ruimiao	China

The B-Boys breaking event at the 2026 Asian Games was held at the Aichi International Exhibition Center Hall F in Tokoname, Aichi Prefecture, Japan, from 2 to 3 October 2026. Shigeyuki Nakarai (Shigekix) successfully defended his title, defeating Kim Hong-yul (Hongten) in the gold medal battle, while Wang Ruimiao (Monkey Z) took the bronze medal.

== Schedule ==
All times are Japan Standard Time (UTC+09:00)

Date	Time	Event
Friday, 2 October 2026	14:45	Pre-selection
Friday, 2 October 2026	17:08	Round of 16
Saturday, 3 October 2026	14:39	Quarterfinals
Saturday, 3 October 2026	16:10	Semifinals
Saturday, 3 October 2026	16:47	Finals

== Results ==
=== Pre-selection ===
Rank	Athlete	Score
1	Shigeyuki Nakarai (JPN)	84.47
2	Wang Ruimiao (CHN)	83.87
3	Kim Hong-yul (KOR)	83.33
4	Sun Chen (TPE)	81.73
5	Isshin Hishikawa (JPN)	81.46
6	Amir Zakirov (KAZ)	80.84
7	Qi Xiangyu (CHN)	80.73
8	Dias Aubakirov (KAZ)	80.41
9	Kim Heon-woo (KOR)	78.61
10	Wu Ding-jie (TPE)	76.87
11	Sze Ka Yam (HKG)	73.47
12	Nguyễn Thành Đạt (VIE)	72.50
13	Nguyễn Văn Hữu (VIE)	71.17
14	Nattaphol Padkhamwong (THA)	67.61
15	Chuluunbaataryn Dölgöön (MGL)	64.44
16	Pongsak Buntanom (THA)	61.13
17	Batjargalyn Tsogtkhas (MGL)	54.89
18	Sadriddin Dorobshokhi (TJK)	46.16
19	Azam Narziev (TJK)	39.80

=== Knockout round ===
Round of 16
1	Shigeyuki Nakarai (JPN)	9	9
16	Pongsak Buntanom (THA)	0	0
9	Kim Heon-woo (KOR)	9	5
8	Dias Aubakirov (KAZ)	0	4
5	Isshin Hishikawa (JPN)	9	8
12	Nguyễn Thành Đạt (VIE)	0	1
4	Sun Chen (TPE)	9	9
13	Nguyễn Văn Hữu (VIE)	0	0
15	Chuluunbaataryn Dölgöön (MGL)	0	0
2	Wang Ruimiao (CHN)	9	9
7	Qi Xiangyu (CHN)	7	4	6
10	Wu Ding-jie (TPE)	2	5	3
11	Sze Ka Yam (HKG)	0	0
6	Amir Zakirov (KAZ)	9	9
14	Nattaphol Padkhamwong (THA)	0	0
3	Kim Hong-yul (KOR)	9	9

Quarterfinals
1	Shigeyuki Nakarai (JPN)	8	6
9	Kim Heon-woo (KOR)	1	3
5	Isshin Hishikawa (JPN)	8	8
4	Sun Chen (TPE)	1	1
2	Wang Ruimiao (CHN)	6	5
7	Qi Xiangyu (CHN)	3	4
6	Amir Zakirov (KAZ)	2	2
3	Kim Hong-yul (KOR)	7	7

Semifinals
1	Shigeyuki Nakarai (JPN)	9	8	9
5	Isshin Hishikawa (JPN)	0	1	0
2	Wang Ruimiao (CHN)	4	4	0
3	Kim Hong-yul (KOR)	5	5	9

Gold medal battle
1	Shigeyuki Nakarai (JPN)	9	8	5
3	Kim Hong-yul (KOR)	0	1	4
Bronze medal battle
5	Isshin Hishikawa (JPN)	4	2	0
2	Wang Ruimiao (CHN)	5	7	9
