= Ukraine at the 2024 Summer Olympics =

- IOC code: UKR
- NOC: National Olympic Committee of Ukraine
- Website: www.noc-ukr.org (in Ukrainian and English)

in Paris, France 26 July 2024 – 11 August 2024
- Competitors: 139 (72 men and 67 women) in 22 sports
- Flag bearers (opening): Mykhailo Romanchuk; Elina Svitolina
- Flag bearers (closing): Parviz Nasibov; Liudmyla Luzan
- Medals Ranked 22nd: Gold 3 Silver 5 Bronze 4 Total 12

Summer Olympics appearances (overview)
- 1996; 2000; 2004; 2008; 2012; 2016; 2020; 2024; 2028

Other related appearances
- Austria (1896–1912); Hungary (1896–1912); Russian Empire (1900–1912); Czechoslovakia (1920–1936); Poland (1924–1936); Romania (1924–1936); Soviet Union (1952–1988); Unified Team (1992)

Ukraine competed at the 2024 Summer Olympics in Paris from 26 July to 11 August 2024. It was the nation's eighth consecutive appearance at the Summer Olympics in the post-Soviet era and the first since the Russian invasion of Ukraine. A total of 140 athletes competed amid the Russian invasion, the lowest number in the history of Ukraine's participation in the games.

Ukraine won 12 medals including three golds, their second worst Summer Olympic performance (behind 2016). Despite this, the haul of three gold medals was Ukraine's highest since 2012, when they obtained five.

== Competitors ==
The following is the list of number of competitors in the Games. Note that reserves in football are not counted:

Sport	Men	Women	Total
Archery	1	1	2
Artistic swimming	0	2	2
Athletics	11	14	25
Badminton	0	1	1
Boxing	3	0	3
Breaking	1	2	3
Canoeing	5	4	9
Cycling	2	2	4
Diving	5	4	9
Fencing	0	6	6
Football	18	0	18
Gymnastics	5	7	12
Judo	2	3	5
Modern pentathlon	2	1	3
Rowing	2	4	6
Shooting	4	2	6
Sport climbing	1	1	2
Swimming	4	1	5
Table tennis	1	2	3
Tennis	0	5	5
Weightlifting	0	1	1
Wrestling	5	4	9
Total	72	67	139

== Medalists ==
Medal	Name	Sport	Event	Date
Gold	Olga Kharlan; Alina Komashchuk; Olena Kravatska; Yuliya Bakastova	Fencing	Women's team sabre	3 August
Gold	Yaroslava Mahuchikh	Athletics	Women's high jump	4 August
Gold	Oleksandr Khyzhniak	Boxing	Men's middleweight	7 August
Silver	Serhiy Kulish	Shooting	Men's 50 m air rifle three positions	1 August
Silver	Illia Kovtun	Gymnastics	Men's parallel bars	5 August
Silver	Parviz Nasibov	Wrestling	Men's Greco-Roman 67 kg	8 August
Silver	Liudmyla Luzan; Anastasiia Rybachok	Canoeing	Women's C-2 500 m	9 August
Silver	Iryna Koliadenko	Wrestling	Women's freestyle 62 kg	10 August
Bronze	Olga Kharlan	Fencing	Women's sabre	29 July
Bronze	Iryna Herashchenko	Athletics	Women's high jump	4 August
Bronze	Mykhaylo Kokhan	Athletics	Men's hammer throw	4 August
Bronze	Zhan Beleniuk	Wrestling	Men's Greco-Roman 87 kg	8 August

Medals by sport
Sport	1st place, gold medalist(s)	2nd place, silver medalist(s)	3rd place, bronze medalist(s)	Total
Athletics	1	0	2	3
Fencing	1	0	1	2
Boxing	1	0	0	1
Wrestling	0	2	1	3
Canoeing	0	1	0	1
Gymnastics	0	1	0	1
Shooting	0	1	0	1
Total	3	5	4	12

Medals by gender
Gender	1st place, gold medalist(s)	2nd place, silver medalist(s)	3rd place, bronze medalist(s)	Total
Male	1	3	2	6
Female	2	2	2	6
Mixed	0	0	0	0
Total	3	5	4	12

Medals by date
Date	1st place, gold medalist(s)	2nd place, silver medalist(s)	3rd place, bronze medalist(s)	Total
29 July	0	0	1	1
1 August	0	1	0	1
3 August	1	0	0	1
4 August	1	0	2	3
5 August	0	1	0	1
7 August	1	0	0	1
8 August	0	1	1	2
9 August	0	1	0	1
10 August	0	1	0	1
Total	3	5	4	12

Multiple medalists
Name	Sport	1st place, gold medalist(s)	2nd place, silver medalist(s)	3rd place, bronze medalist(s)	Total
Olga Kharlan	Fencing	1	0	1	2

== Archery ==
Ukraine qualified two archers to the games through the 2024 European Continental Qualification Tournament in Essen, Germany; and 2024 Final Qualification Tournament in Antalya, Turkey.

Athlete	Event	Ranking round		Round of 64	Round of 32	Round of 16	Quarterfinals	Semifinals	Final / BM	
Athlete	Event	Score	Seed	Opposition Score	Opposition Score	Opposition Score	Opposition Score	Opposition Score	Opposition Score	Rank
Mykhailo Usach	Men's individual	651	48	D'Almeida (BRA); L 2–6	Did not advance					=33
Veronika Marchenko	Women's individual	657	25	Li T-c (TPE); W 6–4	Valencia (MEX); L 4–6	Did not advance				=17
Mykhailo Usach; Veronika Marchenko	Mixed team	1308	21	—N/a		Did not advance				21

== Artistic swimming ==
Ukraine fielded a pair of artistic swimmers to compete in the women's duet as the top three highest-ranked nations, eligible for qualification at the 2024 World Aquatics Championships in Doha, Qatar.

Athlete	Event	Technical routine		Free routine		
Athlete	Event	Points	Rank	Points	Total (technical + free)	Rank
Maryna Aleksiyiva; Vladyslava Aleksiyiva	Duet	260.4600	5	278.2084	538.6684	5

== Athletics ==
Ukrainian track and field athletes achieved the entry standards for Paris 2024, either by passing the direct qualifying mark (or time for track and road races) or by world ranking, in the following events (a maximum of 3 athletes each):

Key

- Note–Ranks given for track events are within the athlete's heat only
- Q = Qualified for the next round
- q = Qualified for the next round as a fastest loser or, in field events, by position without achieving the qualifying target
- R = Qualified for the repechage round
- NR = National record
- N/A = Round not applicable for the event
- Bye = Athlete not required to compete in round

Track & road events

Athlete	Event	Heat		Repechage		Semifinal		Final	
Athlete	Event	Result	Rank	Result	Rank	Result	Rank	Result	Rank
Oleksandr Pohorilko	Men's 400 m	45.71	36 R	45.59	12	Did not advance			
Ihor Hlavan	Men's 20 km walk	—N/a						1:24:52	40
Anna Ryzhykova	Women's 400 m hurdles	55.13	19 R	54.95 =SB	3 Q	55.65	23	Did not advance	
Viktoriya Tkachuk	Women's 400 m hurdles	58.10 SB	38 R	59.40	21	Did not advance			
Olena Sobchuk	Women's 20 km walk	—N/a						1:31:12	20
Mariia Sakharuk	Women's 20 km walk	—N/a						1:30:12	17
Lyudmyla Olyanovska	Women's 20 km walk	—N/a						1:29:55	14

Mixed

Athlete	Event	Heat		Final	
Athlete	Event	Result	Rank	Result	Rank
Oleksandr Pohorilko; Danylo Danylenko; Tetyana Melnyk; Maryana Shostak	Mixed 4 × 400 m relay	3:15.51	14	Did not advance	
Ivan Banzeruk; Ihor Hlavan*; Lyudmyla Olyanovska; Olena Sobchuk*; Hanna Shevchuk*	Marathon race walking mixed relay	—N/a		3:01:50	17

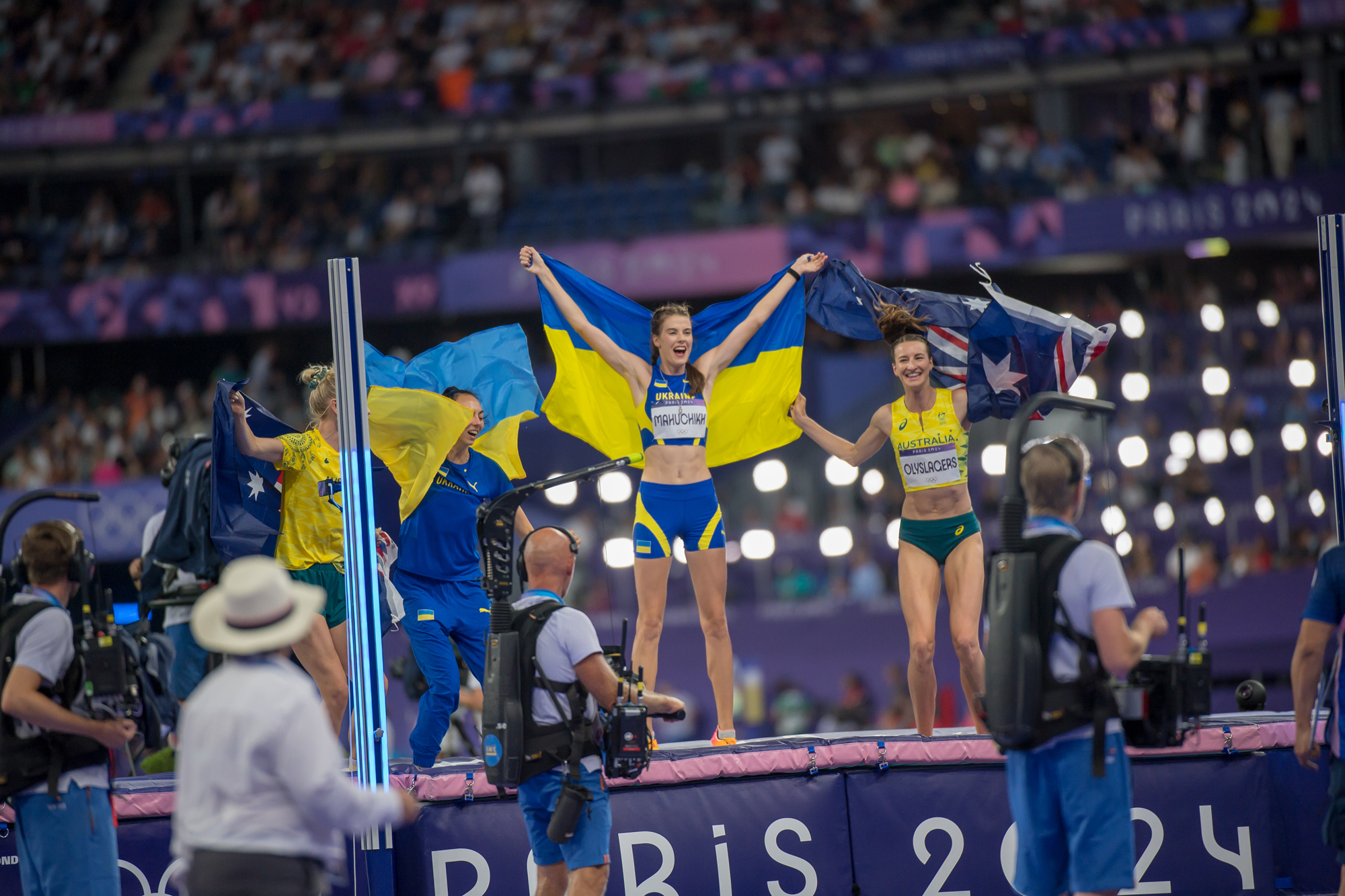
Medallists in women's high jumping

Field events

Athlete	Event	Qualification		Final	
Athlete	Event	Result	Rank	Result	Rank
Oleh Doroshchuk	Men's high jump	2.24	11 q	2.31 PB	6
Vladyslav Lavskyy	Men's high jump	2.15	25	Did not advance	
Andrii Protsenko	Men's high jump	NM		Did not advance	
Roman Kokoshko	Men's shot put	19.36	22	Did not advance	
Mykhaylo Kokhan	Men's hammer throw	77.42	3 Q	79.39	3rd place, bronze medalist(s)
Artur Felfner	Men's javelin throw	81.84	15	Did not advance	
Iryna Herashchenko	Women's high jump	1.95 =SB	4 q	1.95 =SB	3rd place, bronze medalist(s)
Yuliia Levchenko	Women's high jump	NM		Did not advance	
Yaroslava Mahuchikh	Women's high jump	1.95	1 q	2.00	1st place, gold medalist(s)
Maryna Bekh-Romanchuk	Women's triple jump	14.30	8 q	13.98	11
Olha Korsun	Women's triple jump	13.06	29	Did not advance	
Iryna Klymets	Women's hammer throw	66.95	26	Did not advance	

== Badminton ==
Ukraine entered one badminton player into the Olympic tournament based on the BWF Race to Paris Rankings.

Athlete	Event	Group stage			Elimination	Quarter-final	Semi-final	Final / BM	
Athlete	Event	Opposition Score	Opposition Score	Rank	Opposition Score	Opposition Score	Opposition Score	Opposition Score	Rank
Polina Buhrova	Women's singles	Tunjung (INA); L 0–2	Švábíková (CZE); W 2–1	2	Did not advance				

== Boxing ==
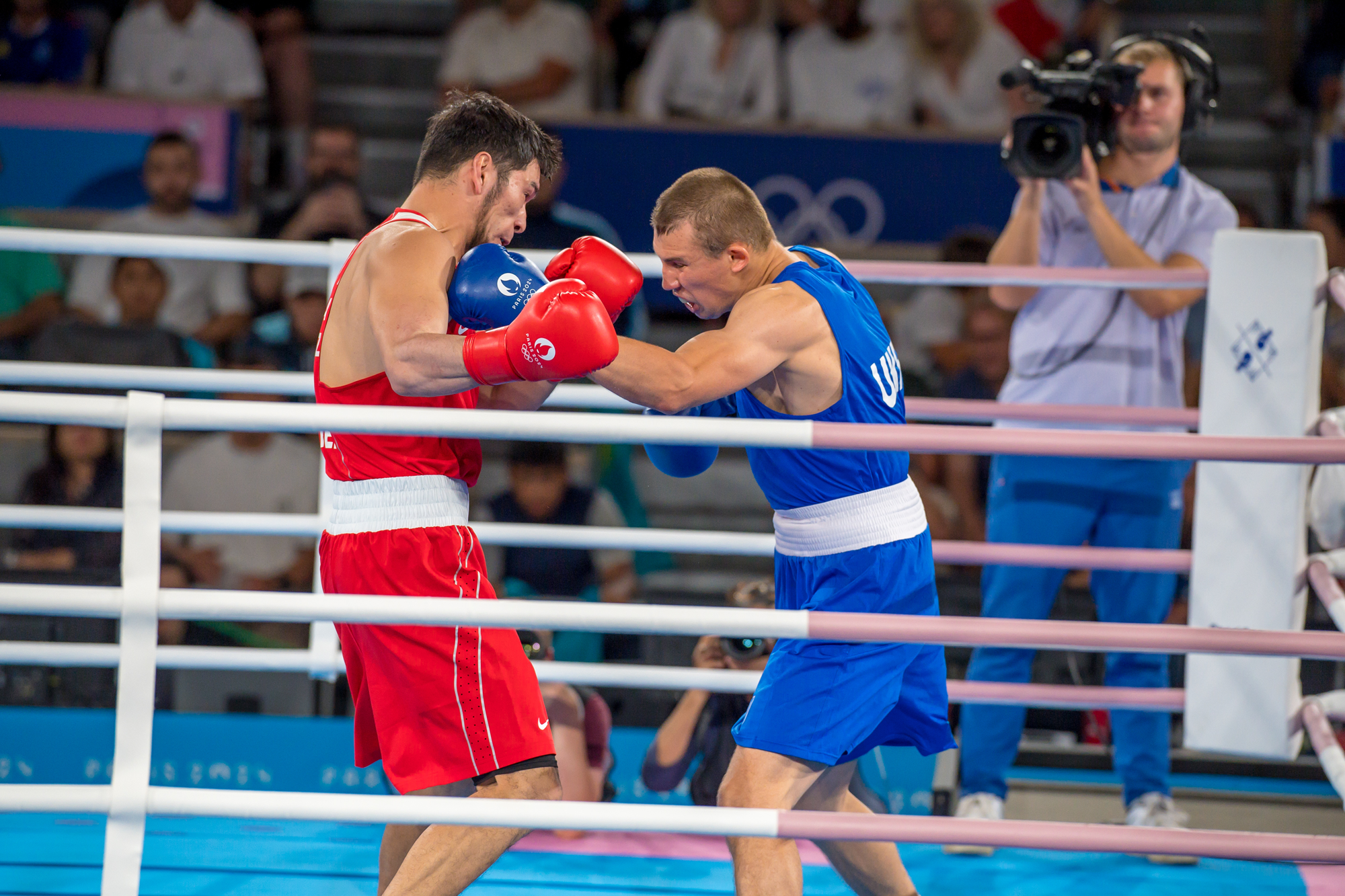
Nurbek Oralbay vs Oleksandr Khyzhniak in the Men's 80 kg gold medal bout on 7 August

Ukraine entered three boxers into the Olympic tournament. Slated to compete at his third straight Games, Tokyo 2020 silver medalist Oleksandr Khyzhniak scored an outright quarterfinal victory to secure a spot in the men's middleweight division at the 2023 European Games in Nowy Targ, Poland.Aider Abduraimov (men's featherweight) and Dmytro Lovchynskyi (men's super heavyweight) secured their spots following the triumph in quota bouts round, at the 2024 World Olympic Qualification Tournament 2 in Bangkok, Thailand.

Athlete	Event	Round of 32	Round of 16	Quarterfinals	Semifinals	Final	
Athlete	Event	Opposition Result	Opposition Result	Opposition Result	Opposition Result	Opposition Result	Rank
Aider Abduraimov	Men's 57 kg	Bye	Ibáñez (BUL); L 0–5	Did not advance			
Oleksandr Khyzhniak	Men's 80 kg	Bye	Akilov (HUN); W 4–0	Pereira (BRA); W 5–0	López (CUB); W 3–2	Oralbay (KAZ); W 3–2	1st place, gold medalist(s)
Dmytro Lovchynskyi	Men's +92 kg	—N/a	Teremoana (AUS); L KO	Did not advance			

== Breaking ==
Ukraine entered three breakdancers to compete in the B-Boy and B-Girl dual battles for Paris 2024. Oleg Kuznietsov (Kuzya), Kateryna Pavlenko (Kate) and Anna Ponomarenko (Stefani) qualified through 2024 Olympic Qualifier Series in Shanghai, China, and Budapest, Hungary.

Athlete	Nickname	Event	Pre-qualification	Round robin				Quarterfinal	Semifinal	Final / BM	
Athlete	Nickname	Event	Opposition Result	Opposition Result	Opposition Result	Opposition Result	Rank	Opposition Result	Opposition Result	Opposition Result	Rank
Oleg Kuznietsov	Kuzya	B-Boys	—N/a	J Attack (AUS); W 2–0	Phil Wizard (CAN); T 1–1	Dany Dann (FRA); L 0–2	3	Did not advance			
Kateryna Pavlenko	Kate	B-Girls	Bye	Carlota (FRA); W 2–0	Ayumi (JPN); T 1–1	Stefani (UKR); T 1–1	1	671 (CHN); L 0–3	Did not advance		
Anna Ponomarenko	Stefani	B-Girls	Bye	Ayumi (JPN); T 1–1	Carlota (FRA); W 2–0	Kate (UKR); T 1–1	3	Did not advance			

== Canoeing ==
=== Slalom ===
Ukraine entered one boat into the slalom competition, for the Games through the 2023 ICF Canoe Slalom World Championships in London, Great Britain.

Athlete	Event	Preliminary						Semifinal		Final	
Athlete	Event	Run 1	Rank	Run 2	Rank	Best	Rank	Time	Rank	Time	Rank
Viktoriia Us	Women's C-1	113.67	16	106.09	6	106.09	9 Q	114.26	8 Q	117.98	11
Viktoriia Us	Women's K-1	100.42	16	98.65	16	98.65	18 Q	120.76	18	Did not advance	

Kayak cross

Athlete	Event	Time trial		Round 1	Repechage	Heat	Quarterfinal	Semifinal	Final	
Athlete	Event	Time	Rank	Position	Position	Position	Position	Position	Position	Rank
Viktoriia Us	Women's KX-1	78.18	26	2 Q	Bye	2 Q	3	Did not advance		11

=== Sprint ===
Ukrainian canoeists qualified one boats in the following distances for the Games through the 2023 ICF Canoe Sprint World Championships in Duisburg, Germany; and 2024 European Qualifier in Szeged, Hungary.

Athlete	Event	Heats		Quarterfinals		Semifinals		Final	
Athlete	Event	Time	Rank	Time	Rank	Time	Rank	Time	Rank
Pavlo Altukhov	Men's C-1 1000 m	4:11.32	5 QF	3:51.58	3	Did not advance			
Oleh Kukharyk; Dmytro Danylenko; Ihor Trunov; Ivan Semykin	Men's K-4 500 m	1:21.55	4 QF	1:20.94	5 Q	1:20.67	4 Q	1:21.01	4
Oleh Kukharyk; Ihor Trunov	Men's K-2 500 m	1:31.24	3 QF	1:29.68	6	Did not advance			
Mariya Povkh	Women's K-1 500 m	1:54.13	4 QF	1:52.09	3 Q	1:52.51	6 FC	2:00.94	24
Anastasiia Rybachok	Women's C-1 200 m	47.04	4 QF	47.11	1 Q	47.76	8 FB	47.71	14
Liudmyla Luzan	Women's C-1 200 m	48.42	4 QF	47.42	1 Q	46.67	7 FB	DNS	16
Liudmyla Luzan; Anastasiia Rybachok	Women's C-2 500 m	1:55.88	2 SF	Bye		1:55.62	3 FA	1:54.30	2nd place, silver medalist(s)

Qualification Legend: FA = Qualify to final (medal); FB = Qualify to final B (non-medal); FC = Qualify to final C (non-medal)

== Cycling ==
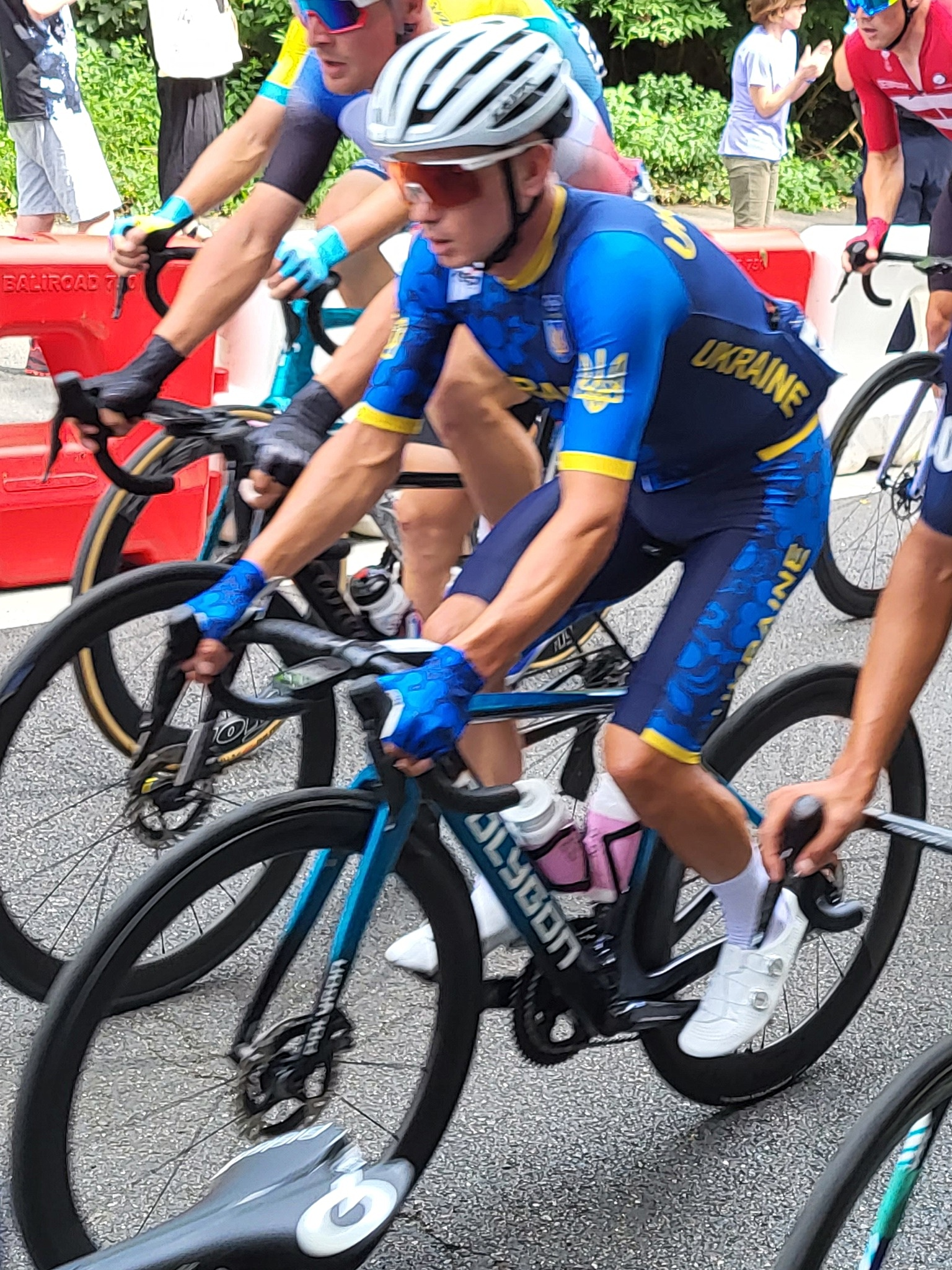
Budyak competing in men's road race

=== Road ===
Ukraine entered one male and one female rider to compete in the road race events at the Olympic, after secured those quota through the UCI Nation Ranking.

Athlete	Event	Time	Rank
Anatoliy Budyak	Men's road race	6:39:27	66
Yuliia Biriukova	Women's road race	4:10:47	67
Yuliia Biriukova	Women's time trial	44:43.73	27

=== Mountain biking ===
Ukraine mountain bikers secured one female quota place for the Olympic through the release of the final Olympic mountain biking rankings.

Athlete	Event	Time	Rank
Yana Belomoyna	Women's cross-country	-1 LAP	26
Oleksandr Hudyma	Men's cross-country	-1 LAP	32

== Diving ==
Ukrainian divers secured six quota places each in the men's synchronized, individual platform and synchronized platform and springboard, and women's individual platform for Paris 2024 by attaining a top-three finish from the list of nations eligible for qualification at the 2023 World Aquatics Championships in Fukuoka, Japan and at the 2024 World Aquatics Championships in Doha, Qatar.

Athlete	Event	Preliminary		Semifinal		Final	
Athlete	Event	Points	Rank	Points	Rank	Points	Rank
Oleh Kolodiy; Danylo Konovalov	Men's 3 m synchronized springboard	—N/a				348.27	7
Oleksii Sereda	Men's 10 m platform	479.45	5 Q	405.05	11 Q	426.90	8
Kirill Boliukh Oleksii Sereda	Men's 10 m synchronized platform	—N/a				412.65	5
Viktoriya Kesar	Women's 3 m springboard	217.75	27	Did not advance			
Anna Pysmenska; Viktoriya Kesar	Women's 3 m synchronized Springboard	—N/a				251.37	7
Sofiia Lyskun	Women's 10 m platform	253.10	25	Did not advance			
Kseniia Bailo; Sofiia Lyskun	Women's 10 m synchronized platform	—N/a				285.00	7

== Fencing ==
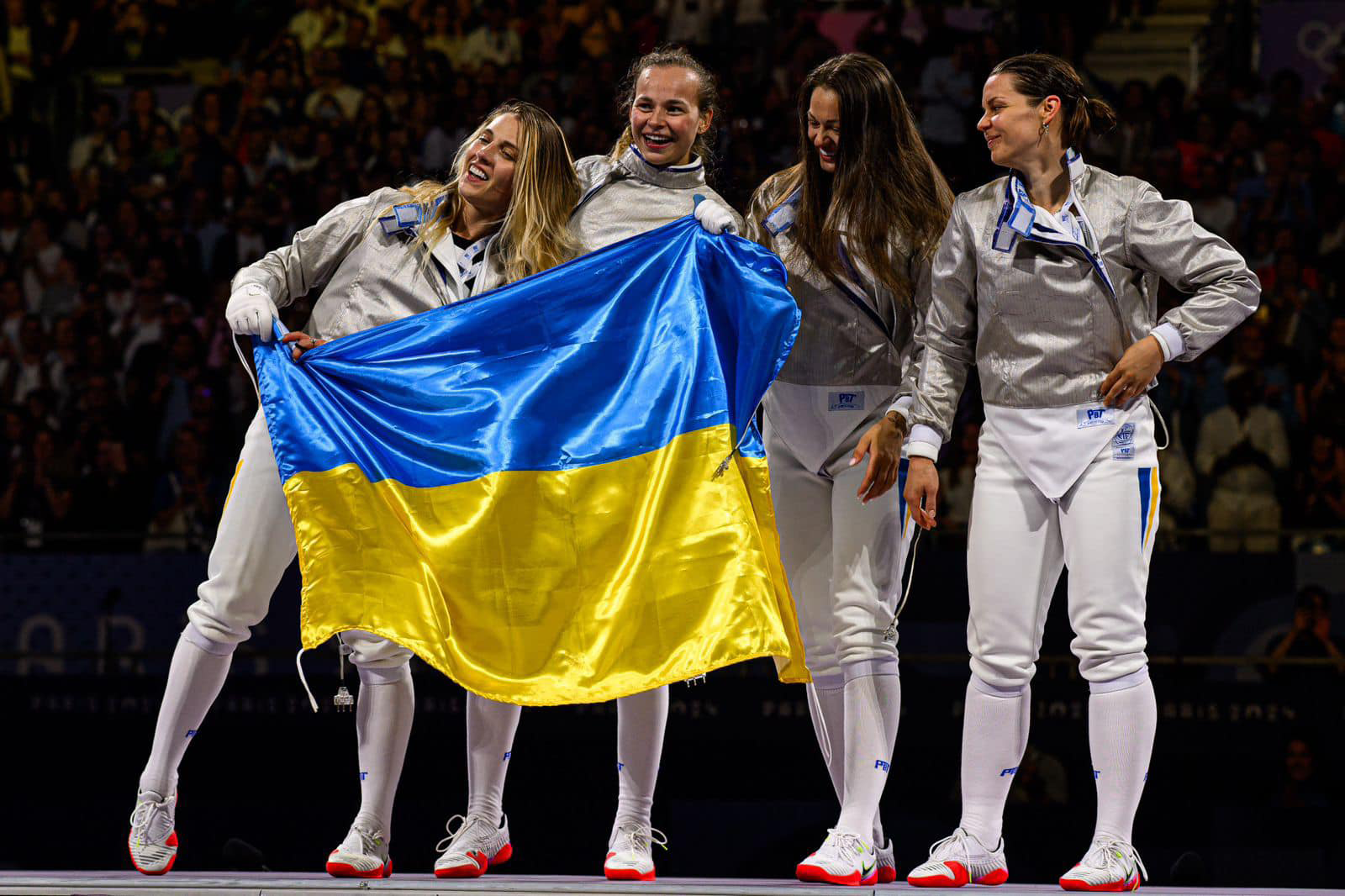
Ukraine women's sabre team after winning in the final of the Olympics

Ukraine entered six fencers into the Olympic competition. The nation's women's sabre team qualified for the games by becoming one of four highest ranked worldwide team; meanwhile women's épée team qualified as the highest European nation's team, through the release of the FIE Official ranking for Paris 2024.

Since July 1, 2020 (and reconfirmed by Fédération Internationale d'Escrime (FIE) public notice in September 2020 and in January 2021), by public written notice the FIE had replaced its previous handshake requirement with a "salute" by the opposing fencers, and written in its public notice that handshakes were "suspended until further notice." Nevertheless, in July 2023 Ukrainian four-time world fencing individual sabre champion Olga Kharlan was disqualified at the World Fencing Championships by the Fédération Internationale d'Escrime for not shaking the hand of her defeated Russian opponent, though Kharlan instead offered a tapping of blades in acknowledgement. Thomas Bach stepped in the next day. As President of the International Olympic Committee (IOC), he sent a letter to Kharlan in which he expressed empathy for her, and wrote that in light of the situation she was being guaranteed a spot in the 2024 Summer Olympics. He wrote further: "as a fellow fencer, it is impossible for me to imagine how you feel at this moment. The war against your country, the suffering of the people in Ukraine, the uncertainty around your participation at the Fencing World Championships ... and then the events which unfolded yesterday – all this is a roller coaster of emotions and feelings. It is admirable how you are managing this incredibly difficult situation, and I would like to express my full support to you. Rest assured that the IOC will continue to stand in full solidarity with the Ukrainian athletes and the Olympic community of Ukraine."

Athlete	Event	Round of 64	Round of 32	Round of 16	Quarterfinal	Semifinal	Final / BM	
Athlete	Event	Opposition Score	Opposition Score	Opposition Score	Opposition Score	Opposition Score	Opposition Score	Rank
Dzhoan Feybi Bezhura	Women's épée	Bye	Mallo (FRA); L 13–14	Did not advance				
Olena Kryvytska	Women's épée	Bye	Ndolo (KEN); W 13–12	Xiao (CAN); W 15–14	Kong (HKG); L 7–15	Did not advance		8
Vlada Kharkova	Women's épée	Bye	Vincenti (USA); W 15–6	Yoshimura (JPN); W 15–10	Mallo (FRA); L 10–15	Did not advance		7
Dzhoan Feybi Bezhura; Olena Kryvytska; Vlada Kharkova; Darya Varfolomeyeva*	Women's team épée	—N/a			China; L 41–45	Classification semifinal Egypt; W 45–31	Fifth place final South Korea; L 38–45	6
Olga Kharlan	Women's sabre	Bye	Fukushima (JPN); W 15–9	Bashta (AZE); W 15–6	Márton (HUN); W 15–7	Balzer (FRA); L 12–15	Choi (KOR); W 15–14	3rd place, bronze medalist(s)
Alina Komashchuk	Women's sabre	Bye	Jeon (KOR); L 12–15	Did not advance				
Olena Kravatska	Women's sabre	Boudiaf (ALG); W 15–8	Emura (JPN); L 14–15	Did not advance				
Olga Kharlan; Alina Komashchuk; Olena Kravatska; Yuliya Bakastova*	Women's team sabre	—N/a			Italy; W 45–37	Japan; W 45–32	South Korea; W 45–42	1st place, gold medalist(s)

== Football ==
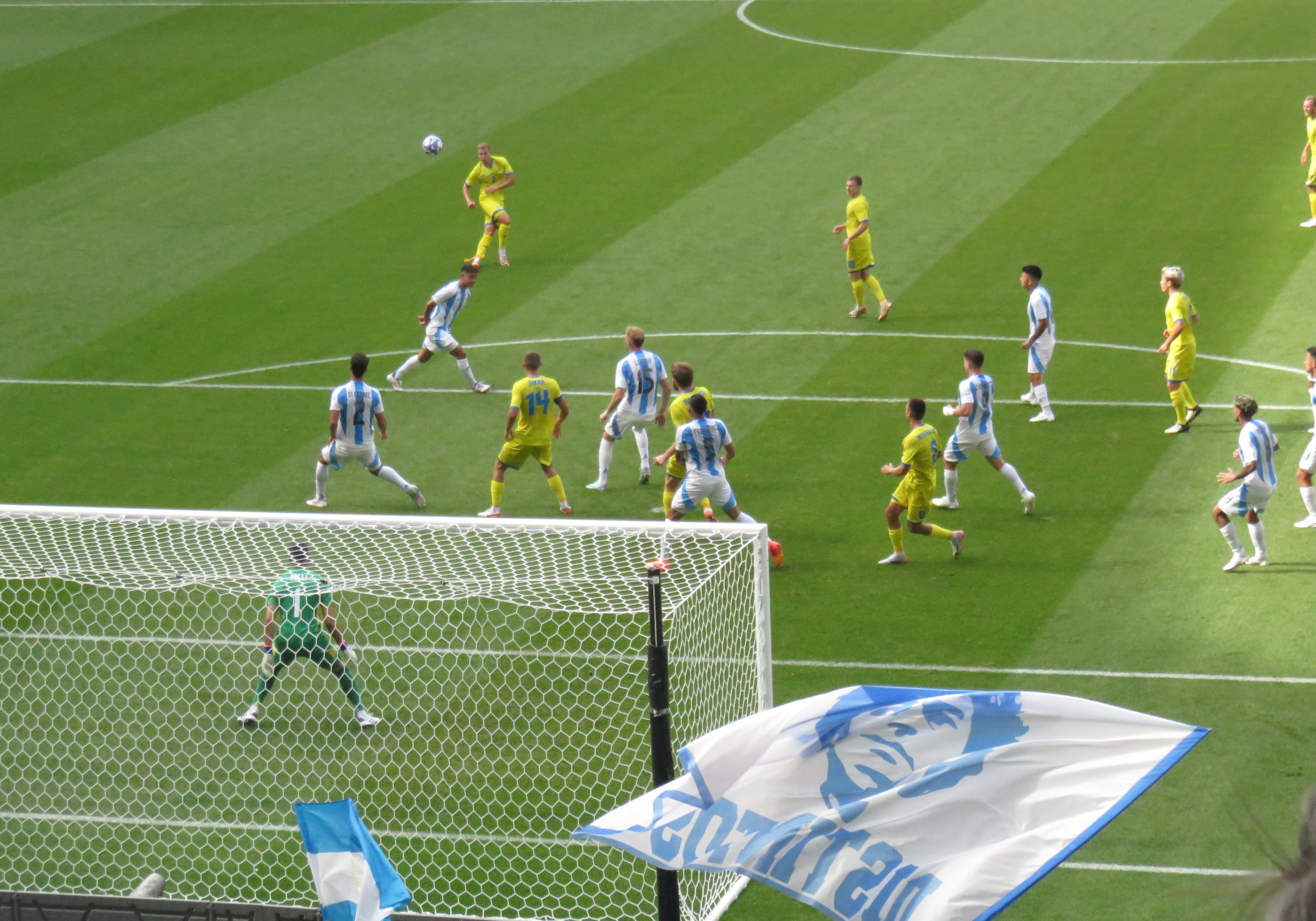
Ukraine playing against Argentina

Summary

Key:

- A.E.T – After extra time.
- P – Match decided by penalty-shootout.

Team	Event	Group Stage				Quarterfinal	Semifinal	Final / BM	
Team	Event	Opposition Score	Opposition Score	Opposition Score	Rank	Opposition Score	Opposition Score	Opposition Score	Rank
Ukraine men's	Men's tournament	Iraq; L 1–2	Morocco; W 2–1	Argentina; L 0–2	3	Did not advance			

=== Men's tournament ===
Ukraine men's football team qualified for the Olympics by advancing to the semifinals of the 2023 UEFA European Under-21 Championship in Georgia and Romania. It is signifying Ukraine's debut in the sport.

Team roster

Ukraine announced their initial 22-men squad on 3 July 2024.

Head coach: Ruslan Rotan

No.	Pos.	Player	Date of birth (age)	Caps	Goals	Club
1	GK	Heorhiy Yermakov	28 March 2002 (aged 22)	3	0	(Ukrainian Association of Football) Oleksandriya
2	DF	Illya Krupskyi	2 October 2004 (aged 19)	4	0	(Ukrainian Association of Football) Vorskla Poltava
3	DF	Oleksandr Martynyuk	25 November 2001 (aged 22)	5	1	(Ukrainian Association of Football) Oleksandriya
4	DF	Maksym Talovyerov*	28 June 2000 (aged 24)	0	0	(Austrian Football Association) LASK
5	MF	Valentyn Rubchynskyi	15 February 2002 (aged 22)	3	0	(Ukrainian Association of Football) Dnipro-1
6	DF	Oleksiy Sych	1 April 2001 (aged 23)	1	0	(Ukrainian Association of Football) Rukh Lviv
7	MF	Oleh Ocheretko	25 May 2003 (aged 21)	1	0	(Ukrainian Association of Football) Shakhtar Donetsk
8	MF	Mykola Mykhaylenko	22 May 2001 (aged 23)	2	1	(Ukrainian Association of Football) Dynamo Kyiv
9	FW	Ihor Krasnopir	1 December 2002 (aged 21)	4	0	(Ukrainian Association of Football) Rukh Lviv
10	MF	Maksym Braharu	21 July 2002 (aged 22)	2	0	(Ukrainian Association of Football) Dynamo Kyiv
11	MF	Maksym Khlan	27 January 2003 (aged 21)	5	2	(Polish Football Association) Lechia Gdańsk
12	GK	Kiril Fesyun	7 August 2002 (aged 21)	3	0	(Ukrainian Association of Football) Shakhtar Donetsk
13	DF	Volodymyr Salyuk	25 June 2002 (aged 22)	3	0	(Ukrainian Association of Football) Chornomorets Odesa
14	FW	Danylo Sikan (captain)	16 April 2001 (aged 23)	4	1	(Ukrainian Association of Football) Shakhtar Donetsk
15	MF	Vladyslav Veleten	1 October 2002 (aged 21)	4	2	(Ukrainian Association of Football) Kolos Kovalivka
16	DF	Arseniy Batahov	5 March 2002 (aged 22)	3	0	(Ukrainian Association of Football) Zorya Luhansk
17	MF	Oleh Fedor	23 July 2004 (aged 20)	6	1	(Ukrainian Association of Football) Rukh Lviv
18	MF	Dmytro Kryskiv*	6 October 2000 (aged 23)	0	0	(Ukrainian Association of Football) Shakhtar Donetsk

* Overage player.

Group play

Pos	Team	Pld	W	D	L	GF	GA	GD	Pts	Qualification
1	Morocco	3	2	0	1	6	3	+3	6 (Note: Head-to-head points: Morocco 3, Argentina 0.)	Advance to knockout stage
2	Argentina	3	2	0	1	6	3	+3	6	Advance to knockout stage
3	Ukraine	3	1	0	2	3	5	−2	3	
4	Iraq	3	1	0	2	3	7	−4	3	

Source: FIFA
Rules for classification: Group stage tiebreakers
Notes:
24 July 2024
19:00

Iraq	2–1	Ukraine
Hussein 57' (pen.); Jasim 75'	Report	Rubchynskyi 53'

Stade de Lyon, Décines-Charpieu
Attendance: 10,637
Referee: Mahmood Ismail (Sudan)

27 July 2024
17:00

Ukraine	2–1	Morocco
Kryskiv 22'; Krasnopir 90+8'	Report	Rahimi 64' (pen.)

Stade Geoffroy-Guichard, Saint-Étienne
Attendance: 28,655
Referee: Saíd Martínez (Honduras)

30 July 2024
17:00

Ukraine	0–2	Argentina
	Report	Almada 47'; Echeverri 90+1'

Stade de Lyon, Décines-Charpieu
Attendance: 10,017
Referee: Dahane Beida (Mauritania)

== Gymnastics ==
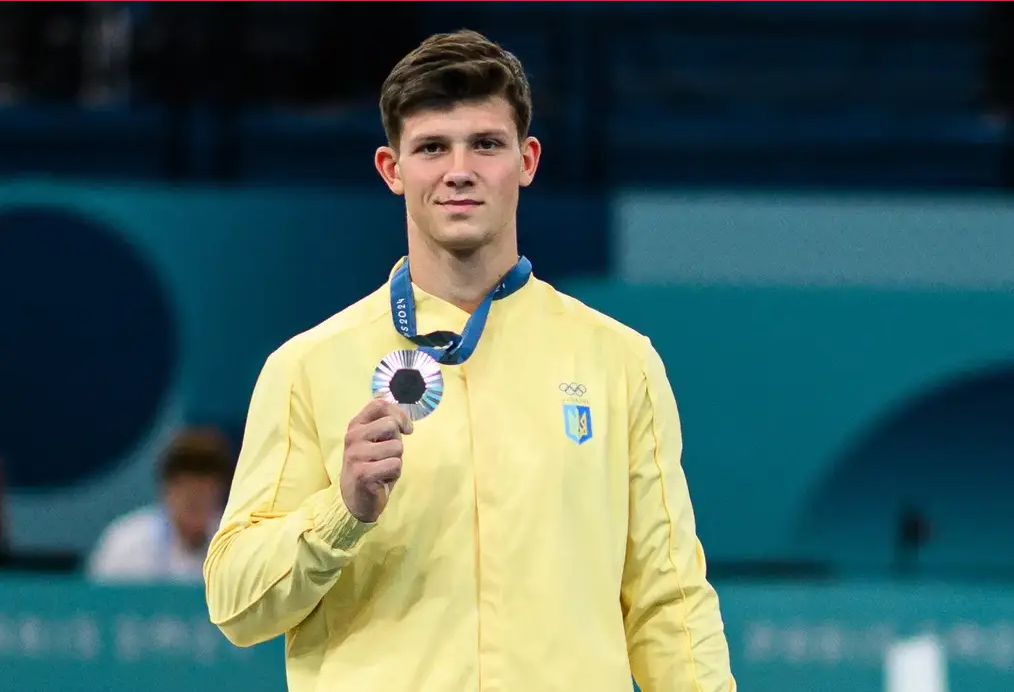
Illia Kovtun with his silver medal in parallel bars

=== Artistic ===
Ukraine fielded a squad of five male gymnasts for Paris after advancing to the final round of team all-around, and obtained one of nine available team spots for nations, not yet qualified, at the 2023 World Championships in Antwerp, Belgium.

Men
Team

Athlete	Event	Qualification								Final							
Athlete	Event	Apparatus						Total	Rank	Apparatus						Total	Rank
Athlete	Event	F	PH	R	V	PB	HB	Total	Rank	F	PH	R	V	PB	HB	Total	Rank
Nazar Chepurnyi	Team	13.533	~~13.000~~	—N/a	14.866	~~14.100~~	13.033	—N/a		13.366	—N/a		14.900	—N/a		—N/a	
Illia Kovtun	Team	14.533	13.466	13.066	~~14.166~~	15.166	~~12.766~~	83.163	11 Q	14.100	14.000	13.233	—N/a	15.433	14.033	—N/a	
Igor Radivilov	Team	—N/a		14.166	14.900	—N/a				—N/a		14.000	14.766	—N/a		—N/a	
Radomyr Stelmakh	Team	13.366	14.033	~~12.933~~	—N/a	14.600	13.600	—N/a		—N/a	14.033	—N/a		14.366	13.666	—N/a	
Oleg Verniaiev	Team	~~13.066~~	15.033	13.600	14.866	15.266	12.800	84.631	7 Q	13.766	14.833	13.666	14.800	15.000	12.800	—N/a	
Total	Team	41.432	42.532	40.832	44.632	45.032	39.433	253.893	4 Q	41.232	42.866	40.899	44.466	44.799	40.499	254.761	5

Individual

Athlete	Event	Qualification								Final							
Athlete	Event	Apparatus						Total	Rank	Apparatus						Total	Rank
Athlete	Event	F	PH	R	V	PB	HB	Total	Rank	F	PH	R	V	PB	HB	Total	Rank
Illia Kovtun	All-around	See team results above								14.700	14.633	13.333	14.266	15.400	13.833	86.165	4
Illia Kovtun	Floor	14.533	—N/a						4 Q	14.533	—N/a					14.533	4
Illia Kovtun	Pommel horse	—N/a	13.466	—N/a					34	Did not advance							
Illia Kovtun	Rings	—N/a		13.066	—N/a				43	Did not advance							
Illia Kovtun	Parallel bars	—N/a				15.166	—N/a		6 Q	—N/a				15.500	—N/a	15.500	2nd place, silver medalist(s)
Illia Kovtun	Horizontal bar	—N/a					12.766	—N/a	48	Did not advance							
Oleg Verniaiev	All-around	See team results above								13.933	14.833	13.533	14.400	15.000	12.700	84.399	8
Oleg Verniaiev	Floor	13.066	—N/a						57	Did not advance							
Oleg Verniaiev	Pommel horse	—N/a	15.033	—N/a					5 Q	—N/a	14.966	—N/a				14.966	5
Oleg Verniaiev	Rings	—N/a		13.600	—N/a				24	Did not advance							
Oleg Verniaiev	Parallel bars	—N/a				15.266	—N/a		4 Q	—N/a				13.300	—N/a	13.300	8
Oleg Verniaiev	Horizontal bar	—N/a					12.800	—N/a	45	Did not advance							
Nazar Chepurnyi	Floor	13.533	—N/a						41	Did not advance							
Nazar Chepurnyi	Pommel horse	—N/a	13.000	—N/a					44	Did not advance							
Nazar Chepurnyi	Vault	—N/a			14.833	—N/a			1 Q	—N/a			14.899	—N/a		14.899	6
Nazar Chepurnyi	Parallel bars	—N/a				14.100	—N/a		36	Did not advance							
Nazar Chepurnyi	Horizontal bar	—N/a					13.033	—N/a	42	Did not advance							
Radomyr Stelmakh	Floor	13.366	—N/a						46	Did not advance							
Radomyr Stelmakh	Pommel horse	—N/a	14.033	—N/a					20	Did not advance							
Radomyr Stelmakh	Rings	—N/a			12.933	—N/a			54	Did not advance							
Radomyr Stelmakh	Parallel bars	—N/a				14.600	—N/a		15	Did not advance							
Radomyr Stelmakh	Horizontal bar	—N/a					13.600	—N/a	24	Did not advance							
Igor Radivilov	Rings	—N/a			14.166	—N/a			15	Did not advance							
Igor Radivilov	Vault	—N/a				14.700	—N/a		4 Q	—N/a			14.166	—N/a		14.166	8

Women

Athlete	Event	Qualification						Final					
Athlete	Event	Apparatus				Total	Rank	Apparatus				Total	Rank
Athlete	Event	V	UB	BB	F	Total	Rank	V	UB	BB	F	Total	Rank
Anna Lashchevska	All-around	12.833	13.033	11.866	12.566	50.298	49	Did not advance					
Anna Lashchevska	Uneven bars	—N/a	13.033	—N/a			46	Did not advance					
Anna Lashchevska	Balance beam	—N/a		11.866	—N/a		65	Did not advance					
Anna Lashchevska	Floor	—N/a			12.566	—N/a	48	Did not advance					

=== Rhythmic ===
Ukraine entered a full-squad of rhythmic gymnasts into the games by virtue of the nation's result at the 2023 World Championships in Valencia, Spain.

Athlete	Event	Qualification						Final					
Athlete	Event	Hoop	Ball	Clubs	Ribbon	Total	Rank	Hoop	Ball	Clubs	Ribbon	Total	Rank
Taisiia Onofriichuk	Individual	34.250	35.250	33.750	32.500	135.750	4	30.400	30.900	34.150	32.950	128.400	9

Athletes	Event	Qualification				Final			
Athletes	Event	5 apps	3+2 apps	Total	Rank	5 apps.	3+2 apps	Total	Rank
Diana Baieva; Alina Melnyk; Mariia Vysochanska; Valeriia Peremeta; Kira Shyrykina	Group	35.450	33.500	68.950	3	36.550	29.150	65.700	7

== Judo ==
Ukraine qualified four judoka (two men and two women) for each of the following weight classes at the Games. Dilshot Khalmatov (men's extra-lightweight, 60 kg), Bogdan Iadov (men's half-lightweight, 66 kg), Daria Bilodid (women's lightweight, 57 kg) and Yelyzaveta Lytvynenko (women's half-heavyweight, 78 kg) were selected among the top 17 judoka of their respective weight classes based on the IJF World Ranking List of June 26, 2024. Fifth judoka got quota after reallocation continental quota of AIN athletes.

Athlete	Event	Round of 64	Round of 32	Round of 16	Quarterfinals	Semifinals	Repechage	Final / BM	
Athlete	Event	Opposition Result	Opposition Result	Opposition Result	Opposition Result	Opposition Result	Opposition Result	Opposition Result	Rank
Dilshot Khalmatov	Men's –60 kg	—N/a	Ruziev (UZB); W 1–0	Smetov (KAZ); L 0–1	Did not advance				
Bogdan Iadov	Men's –66 kg	—N/a	Aibek (KGZ); W 11–0	Yondonperenlei (MGL); L 0–10	Did not advance				
Daria Bilodid	Women's –57 kg	—N/a	Tiebwa (KIR); W 10–0	Funakubo (JPN); L 0–10	Did not advance				
Yelyzaveta Lytvynenko	Women's –78 kg	—N/a	Bye	Kuka (KOS); W 1–0	Bellandi (ITA); L 0–10	Did not advance	Zhenzhao (CHN); L 0–10	Did not advance	=7
Khrystyna Homan	Women's +78 kg	—N/a	Kamps (NED); L 0–10	Did not advance					

== Modern pentathlon ==
Ukrainian modern pentathletes three quota places for Paris 2024. Oleksandr Tovkai secured his selection in the men's event by finishing twelfth overall in the individual rankings and among the eight highest-ranked modern pentathletes eligible for qualification at the 2023 European Games in Kraków, Poland; meanwhile Valeriya Permykina and Vladyslav Chekan, qualified through the release of the final Olympic ranking.

Athlete	Event		Fencing (épée one touch)				Riding (show jumping)			Swimming (200 m freestyle)			Combined: shooting/running (10 m laser pistol)/(3000 m)			Total points	Final rank
Athlete	Event		RR	BR	Rank	MP points	Penalties	Rank	MP points	Time	Rank	MP points	Time	Rank	MP points	Total points	Final rank
Vladyslav Chekan	Men's	Semifinal	15–20	0	15	200	0	4	300	2:02.82	10	305	10:19.49	9	681	1486	11
Vladyslav Chekan	Men's	Final	15–20	Did not advance													
Oleksandr Tovkai	Men's	Semifinal	24–11	4	1	249	EL		0	2:00.93	6	309	10:36.41	13	664	1222	17
Oleksandr Tovkai	Men's	Final	24–11	Did not advance													
Valeriya Permykina	Women's	Semifinal	15–20	4	12	204	3	7	297	2:19.78	12	271	11:35.69	6	605	1377	10
Valeriya Permykina	Women's	Final	15–20	Did not advance													

== Rowing ==
Ukrainian rowers qualified two boats for the following events, through the 2024 European Qualification Regatta in Szeged, Hungary and 2024 Final Qualification Regatta in Lucerne, Switzerland.

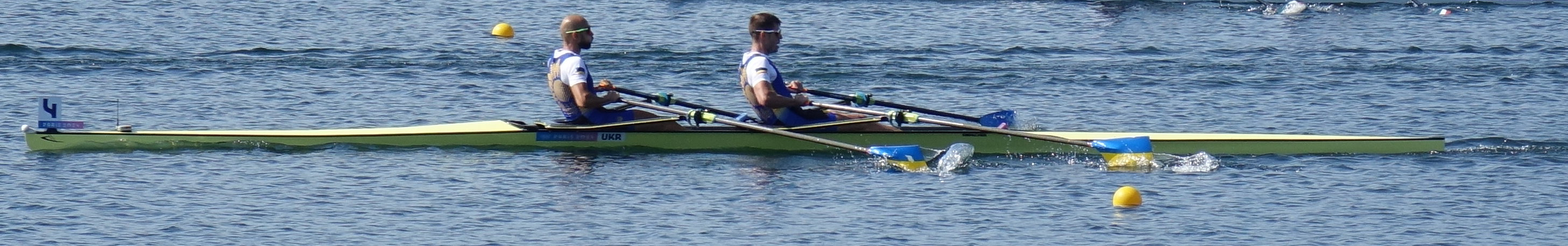
Kovalov and Khmara competing in LM2x

Athlete	Event	Heats		Repechage		Semifinals		Final	
Athlete	Event	Time	Rank	Time	Rank	Time	Rank	Time	Rank
Stanislav Kovalov; Ihor Khmara	Men's lightweight double sculls	7:00.13	4 R	6:46.05	2 SA/B	6:37.35	5 FB	6:26.32	11
Daryna Verkhohliad; Yevheniya Dovhodko; Anastasiya Kozhenkova; Kateryna Dudchenko; Nataliya Dovhodko*	Women's quadruple sculls	6:20.09	2 FA	Bye		—N/a		6:23.05	5

Qualification Legend: FA=Final A (medal); FB=Final B (non-medal); FC=Final C (non-medal); FD=Final D (non-medal); FE=Final E (non-medal); FF=Final F (non-medal); SA/B=Semifinals A/B; SC/D=Semifinals C/D; SE/F=Semifinals E/F; QF=Quarterfinals; R=Repechage

== Shooting ==
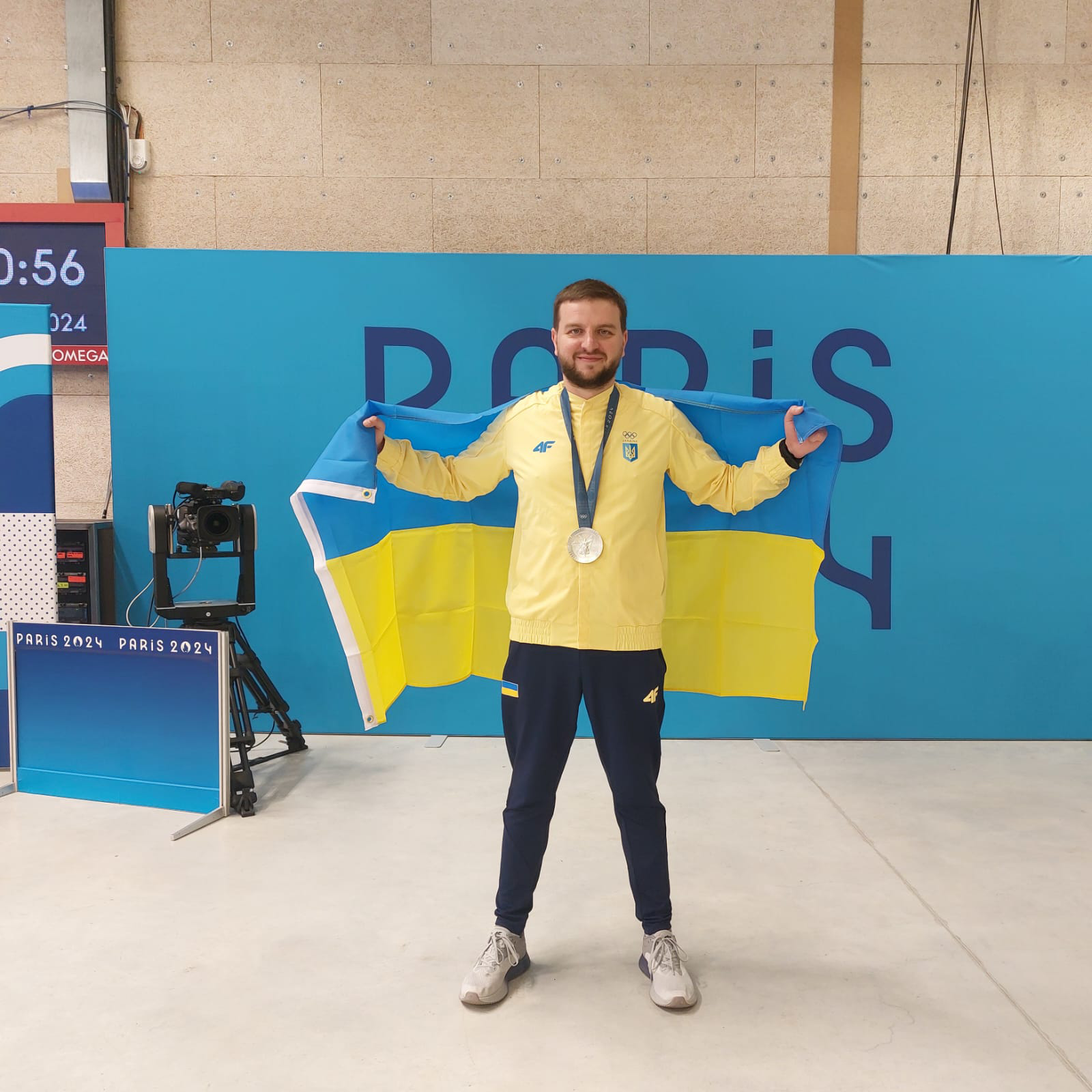
Serhiy Kulish after winning silver

Ukrainian shooters achieved quota places for the following events based on their results at the 2022 and 2023 ISSF World Championships, 2022, 2023, and 2024 European Championships, 2023 European Games, and 2024 ISSF World Olympic Qualification Tournament.

Athlete	Event	Qualification		Final	
Athlete	Event	Points	Rank	Points	Rank
Serhiy Kulish	Men's 10 m rifle	627.4	27	Did not advance	
Serhiy Kulish	Men's 50 m rifle 3 positions	592-39x	3	461.3	2nd place, silver medalist(s)
Pavlo Korostylov	Men's 10 m air pistol	576-20x	12	Did not advance	
Pavlo Korostylov	Men's 25 m rapid fire pistol	587-17x	3	16	5
Viktor Bankin	Men's 10 m air pistol	576-20x	11	Did not advance	
Maksym Horodynets	Men's 25 m rapid fire pistol	584-14x	8	Did not advance	
Olena Kostevych	Women's 10 m air pistol	572-19x	19	Did not advance	
Olena Kostevych	Women's 25 m pistol	576-19x	25	Did not advance	
Iryna Malovichko	Women's skeet	113	24	Did not advance	

Mixed

Athlete	Event	Qualification		Final	
Athlete	Event	Points	Rank	Points	Rank
Viktor Bankin; Olena Kostevych	10 m air pistol team	572-19x	13	Did not advance	

== Sport climbing ==
Ukraine qualified two climbers for Paris 2024. Yaroslav Tkach qualified directly for the men's speed events, Jenya Kazbekova qualified for the women's Boulder and lead combined event, through the 2024 Olympic Qualifier series ranking.

Boulder & lead combined

Athlete	Event	Qualification						Final					
Athlete	Event	Boulder		Lead		Total	Rank	Boulder		Lead		Total	Rank
Athlete	Event	Points	Rank	Points	Rank	Total	Rank	Points	Rank	Points	Rank	Total	Rank
Jenya Kazbekova	Women's	39.5	14	45.1	14	84.6	15	Did not advance					

Speed

Athlete	Event	Qualification		Round of 16	Quarterfinals	Semifinals	Final / BM	
Athlete	Event	Time	Rank	Opposition Time	Opposition Time	Opposition Time	Opposition Time	Rank
Yaroslav Tkach	Men's	5.11	7	Mawem (FRA); L 5.17–5.16	Did not advance			9

== Swimming ==
Ukrainian swimmers achieved the entry standards in the following events for Paris 2024 (a maximum of two swimmers under the Olympic Qualifying Time (OST) and potentially at the Olympic Consideration Time (OCT)):

Athlete	Event	Heat		Semifinal		Final	
Athlete	Event	Time	Rank	Time	Rank	Time	Rank
Vladyslav Bukhov	Men's 50 m freestyle	21.89	11 Q	21.76	11	Did not advance	
Mykhailo Romanchuk	Men's 800 m freestyle	7:49.75	17	—N/a		Did not advance	
Mykhailo Romanchuk	Men's 1500 m freestyle	DNS		—N/a		Did not advance	
Oleksandr Zheltyakov	Men's 100 m backstroke	54.32	24	Did not advance			
Oleksandr Zheltyakov	Men's 200 m backstroke	1:58.41	20	Did not advance			
Denys Kesil	Men's 200 m butterfly	1:57.72	24	Did not advance			
Nika Sharafutdinova	Women's 100 m backstroke	1:01.47	22	Did not advance			

== Table tennis ==
Ukraine entered three athletes into the games. Yaroslav Zhmudenko and Margaryta Pesotska secured their spots at the Games via winning one of five available places, respectively for men's and women's singles event, through the 2024 European Qualification Tournament in Sarajevo, Bosnia and Herzegovina. Later on, Solomiya Brateyko qualified for the games, through the world ranking cut-off for Paris 2024.

Athlete	Event	Preliminary	Round 1	Round 2	Round of 16	Quarterfinals	Semifinals	Final / BM	
Athlete	Event	Opposition Result	Opposition Result	Opposition Result	Opposition Result	Opposition Result	Opposition Result	Opposition Result	Rank
Yaroslav Zhmudenko	Men's singles	Bye	Zhendong (CHN); L 0–4	Did not advance					
Margaryta Pesotska	Women's singles	Bye	Paranang (THA); W 4–3	Szőcs (ROU); L 1–4	Did not advance				
Solomiya Brateyko	Women's singles	Bye	Samara (ROU); L 3–4	Did not advance					

== Tennis ==
Ukraine entered five tennis players into the Olympic tournament. Anhelina Kalinina withdrew from women's singles competition.

Athlete	Event	Round of 64	Round of 32	Round of 16	Quarterfinals	Semifinals	Final / BM	
Athlete	Event	Opposition Score	Opposition Score	Opposition Score	Opposition Score	Opposition Score	Opposition Score	Rank
Marta Kostyuk	Women's singles	Sun (NZL); W 6–4, 6–3	Burel (FRA); W 7–6^{(7–3)}, 6–2	Sakkari (GRE); W 4–6, 7–6^{(7–5)}, 6–4	Vekić (CRO); L 4–6, 6–2, 6–7^{(8–10)}	Did not advance		=5
Elina Svitolina	Women's singles	Uchijima (JPN); W 6–2, 6–1	Pegula (USA); W 4–6, 6–1, 6–3	Krejčíková (CZE); L 6–7^{(5–7)}, 6–2, 4–6	Did not advance			=9
Dayana Yastremska	Women's singles	Pigossi (BRA); W 3–6, 7–5, 6–0	Osorio (COL); L 6–7^{(4–7)}, 4–6	Did not advance				=17
Marta Kostyuk; Dayana Yastremska	Women's doubles	—N/a	Linette / Rosolska (POL); W 6–4, 6–1	Hsieh / Tsao (TPE); L WO	Did not advance			=9
Lyudmyla Kichenok; Nadiia Kichenok	Women's doubles	—N/a	Xin Wang / Zheng (CHN); W 6–1, 6–4	Collins / Krawczyk (USA); W 3–6, 6–4, [10–7]	Bucșa / Sorribes Tormo (ESP); L 3–6, 6–2, [10–12]	Did not advance		=5

== Weightlifting ==
Ukraine entered one weightlifter into the Olympic competition. Kamila Konotop (women's 59 kg) secured one of the top ten slots in her weight divisions based on the IWF Olympic Qualification Rankings.

Athlete	Event	Snatch		Clean & Jerk		Total	Rank
Athlete	Event	Result	Rank	Result	Rank	Total	Rank
Kamila Konotop	Women's −59 kg	104	5	123	7	227	7

== Wrestling ==
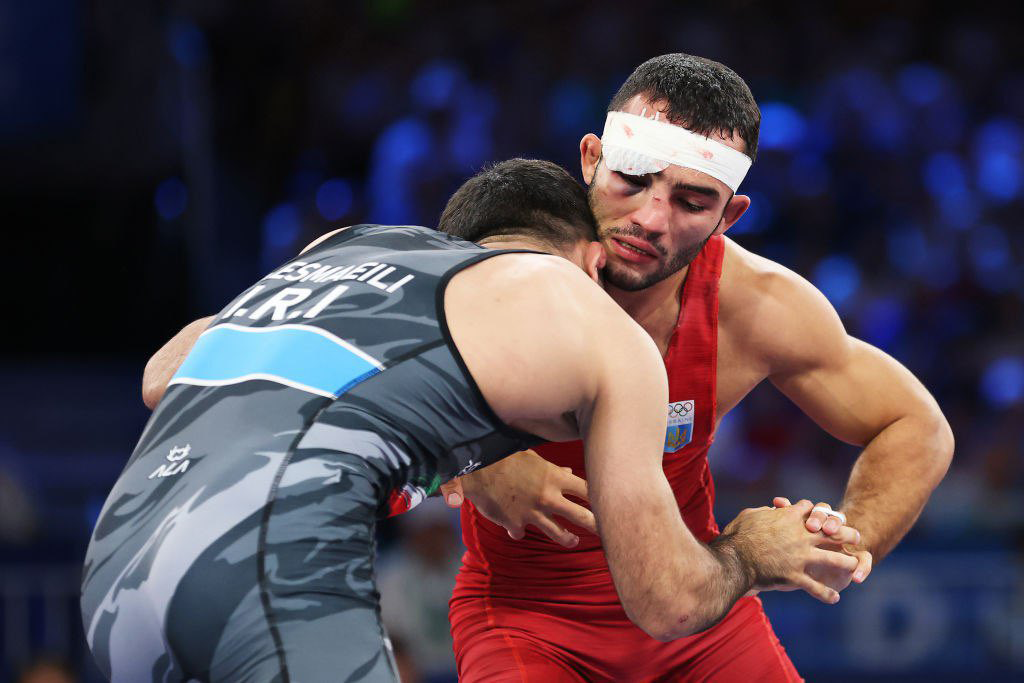
Parviz Nasibov (right) competing in the Men's Greco-Roman 67 kg gold medal match

Ukraine qualified eight wrestlers for each of the following classes into the Olympic competition. Iryna Koliadenko and Zhan Beleniuk qualified for the games by virtue of top five results through the 2023 World Championships in Belgrade, Serbia.Alina Hrushyna, Manola Skobelska, Vasyl Mykhailov, Oleksandr Khotsianivskyi, and Illia Archaia secured their spots due to reallocations of Individual Neutral Athletes quota.

Key:

- VT (ranking points: 5–0 or 0–5) – Victory by fall.
- VB (ranking points: 5–0 or 0–5) – Victory by injury (VF for forfeit, VA for withdrawal or disqualification)
- PP (ranking points: 3–1 or 1–3) – Decision by points – the loser with technical points.
- PO (ranking points: 3–0 or 0–3) – Decision by points – the loser without technical points.
- ST (ranking points: 4–0 or 0–4) – Great superiority – the loser without technical points and a margin of victory of at least 8 (Greco-Roman) or 10 (freestyle) points.
- SP (ranking points: 4–1 or 1–4) – Technical superiority – the loser with technical points and a margin of victory of at least 8 (Greco-Roman) or 10 (freestyle) points.

Freestyle

Athlete	Event	Round of 16	Quarterfinal	Semifinal	Repechage	Final / BM	
Athlete	Event	Opposition Result	Opposition Result	Opposition Result	Opposition Result	Opposition Result	Rank
Vasyl Mykhailov	Men's −86 kg	Amine (SMR); L 4–7^{PP}	Did not advance				10
Murazi Mchedlidze	Men's −97 kg	Çiftçi (TUR); W 5–1^{PP}	Matcharashvili (GEO); L 0–11ST	Did not advance	Lange (RSA); W 5–3^{PP}	Magomedov (AZE); L 0–10ST	=5
Oleksandr Khotsianivskyi	Men's +125 kg	Petriashvili (GEO); L 0–11ST	Did not advance		Baran (POL); L 0–3^{PO}	Did not advance	16
Oksana Livach	Women's −50 kg	Keunimjaeva (UZB); W 10–0^{PP}	~~Phogat (IND)~~; L 5–7^{PP}	Did not advance	Bye	Susaki (JPN); L 0–10ST	=5
Alina Hrushyna	Women's −57 kg	Lysak (POL); W 16–13^{PP}	Maroulis (USA); L 4–7^{PP}	Did not advance			9
Iryna Koliadenko	Women's −62 kg	Pürevdorjiin (MGL); W 8–7^{PP}	Dudova (BUL); W 7–3^{PP}	Tynybekova (KGZ); W 9–2^{PP}	Bye	Motoki (JPN); L 1–12^{SP}	2nd place, silver medalist(s)
Tetiana Rizhko	Women's −68 kg	Dahiya (IND); L 4–6^{PP}	Did not advance				11

Greco-Roman

Athlete	Event	Round of 16	Quarterfinal	Semifinal	Repechage	Final / BM	
Athlete	Event	Opposition Result	Opposition Result	Opposition Result	Opposition Result	Opposition Result	Rank
Parviz Nasibov	Men's −67 kg	Nemes (SRB); W 3–2^{PP}	Ismailov (KGZ); W 7–6^{PP}	Jafarov (AZE); W 3–3^{PP}	Bye	Esmaeili (IRI); L 5–6^{PP}	2nd place, silver medalist(s)
Zhan Beleniuk	Men's −87 kg	Qian (CHN); W 7–1^{PP}	Tursynov (KAZ); W 7–3^{PP}	Mohmadi (IRI); L 3–3^{PP}	Bye	Kułynycz (POL); W 3–1^{PP}	3rd place, bronze medalist(s)
