= Gaëtan Alin =

French breakdancer (born 1988)

Personal information
- Full name: Gaëtan Rodrigue Alin
- Born: 28 May 1988 (age 38) Fort-de-France, Martinique
- Home town: Paris, France

Sport
- Country: France
- Sport: Breaking

Gaëtan Rodrigue Alin (born 28 May 1988) is a French breakdancer. He competed in the B-Boys event at the 2024 Summer Olympics.

== Career ==
Alin began breakdancing at the age of 12.

He has been a member of Portuguese dance crew Momentum Crew, and is a member of Dutch dance crew The Ruggeds.

In August 2022, he won the Outbreak Europe competition, defeating compatriot Danis Civil in the finals.
