= Venues of the 2022 Asian Para Games =

The 2022 Asian Para Games will be held in 19 venues in Hangzhou, Zhejiang, China.

== Sporting venues ==
Venue	Sports	Capacity	Ref.
Hangzhou Sports Park Stadium	Ceremonies	80,000	
Zhejiang Tangxi Goalball Base	Goalball		
Hangzhou Wenhui School Lawn Bowls Green	Lawn Bowls	1,000	
Fuyang Yinhu Sports Center	Archery and Shooting	10,531	
Gongshu Canal Sports Park Gymnasium	Table Tennis	6,930	
Hangzhou Qi Yuan Chess Hall	Board Games	____	
Xiaoshan Sports Center Gymnasium	Powerlifting	1,901	
Xiaoshan Linpu Gymnasium	Judo	2,700	
Xiaoshan Guali Sports Centre	Taekwondo	4,600	
Hangzhou Dianzi University Gymnasium	Wheelchair fencing	4,599	
Hangzhou Gymnasium	Boccia	4,300	
Gongshu Canal Sports Park Stadium	Blind Football	4,870	
Huanglong Sports Center Stadium	Athletics	51,971	
Binjiang Gymnasium	Badminton	3,900	
Hangzhou Olympic Sports Center - Tennis Center	Wheelchair tennis	10,000 (centre court)	
Hangzhou Sports Center - Aquatics Arena	Swimming	6,000	
Chun'an Jieshou Sports Center Velodrome	Cycling		
Fuyang Water Sports Center	Canoeing and Rowing	3,000	
Hangzhou Olympic Sports Centre Gymnasium	wheelchair basketball	18,000	
Linping Sports Centre Gymnasium	Sitting volleyball	4,200	
