= Breaking at the 2026 Asian Games =

- Venue: Aichi International Exhibition Center
- Dates: 2–3 October 2026
- Competitors: 36 from 10 nations

The breakdancing competitions at the 2026 Asian Games was held between 2 and 3 October 2026 at the Aichi International Exhibition Center, Hall F.

Each National Olympic Committee (NOC) could enter a maximum of 4 competitors, 2 per each gender.

== Schedule ==
Q	Qualification	R	Round of 16	¼	Quarterfinals	½	Semifinals	F	Finals

Event↓/Date →	2nd Fri		3rd Sat		
B-Boys	Q	R	¼	½	F
B-Girls	Q	R	¼	½	F

== Medalists ==
Event	Gold	Silver	Bronze
B-Boys	Shigeyuki Nakarai; Japan	Kim Hong-yul; South Korea	Wang Ruimiao; China
B-Girls	Guo Pu; China	Ayumi Fukushima; Japan	Liu Qingyi; China

== Medal table ==
Rank	Nation	Gold	Silver	Bronze	Total
1	Japan (JPN)	1	1	0	2
2	China (CHN)	1	0	2	3
3	South Korea (KOR)	0	1	0	1
Totals (3 entries)		2	2	2	6

== Participating nations ==
A total of 36 athletes from 10 nations competed in breaking at the 2026 Asian Games:

- China (4)
- Chinese Taipei (4)
- Hong Kong (1)
- Japan (4)
- Kazakhstan (4)
- Mongolia (3)
- South Korea (4)
- Tajikistan (4)
- Thailand (4)
- Vietnam (4)
