= Breaking at the 2022 Asian Games =

- Venue: Gongshu Canal Sports Park Gymnasium
- Dates: 6–7 October 2023
- Competitors: 45 from 13 nations

Breakdancing at the 2022 Asian Games was held at Gongshu Canal Sports Park Gymnasium, Hangzhou, China from 6 to 7 October 2023. This marked the debut of this discipline at the Asian Games. Each National Olympic Committee (NOC) could enter a maximum of 4 competitors, 2 per each gender.

== Schedule ==
Q	Qualification	R	Round robin	¼	Quarterfinals	½	Semifinals	F	Finals

Event↓/Date →	6th Fri		7th Sat		
B-Boys	Q	R	¼	½	F
B-Girls	Q	R	¼	½	F

== Medalists ==
Event	Gold	Silver	Bronze
B-Boys	Shigeyuki Nakarai; Japan	Kim Hong-yul; South Korea	Qi Xiangyu; China
B-Girls	Liu Qingyi; China	Ami Yuasa; Japan	Ayumi Fukushima; Japan

== Medal table ==
Rank	Nation	Gold	Silver	Bronze	Total
1	Japan (JPN)	1	1	1	3
2	China (CHN)	1	0	1	2
3	South Korea (KOR)	0	1	0	1
Totals (3 entries)		2	2	2	6

== Participating nations ==
A total of 45 athletes from 13 nations competed in breaking at the 2022 Asian Games:

- China (4)
- Chinese Taipei (4)
- Hong Kong (4)
- Japan (4)
- Kazakhstan (3)
- Mongolia (3)
- Nepal (1)
- Philippines (3)
- South Korea (4)
- Tajikistan (4)
- Thailand (4)
- Uzbekistan (3)
- Vietnam (4)
