= Breaking at the 2023 Pan American Games – B-Boys =

B-Boys at the 2023 Pan American Games
- Venue: Chimkowe Gym
- Dates: November 3 – November 4
- Competitors: 16 from 10 nations

Medalists
Gold medal	Phil Wizard	Canada
Silver medal	Jeffro	United States
Bronze medal	Matita	Chile

The b-boys competition of the breaking events at the 2023 Pan American Games was held from November 3 to 4 at Chimkowe Gym in Santiago, Chile.

Breaking made its debut in 2023 as a Pan American sport, serving as a qualifier for its Olympic debut at Paris 2024.

== Schedule ==
Date	Time	Round
November 3, 2023	19:10	Round Robin
November 4, 2023	17:30	Quarterfinals
November 4, 2023	18:25	Semifinals
November 4, 2023	19:20	Final

== Round Robin ==
=== Group A ===
The athletes with the two highest votes advance to quarterfinals.

Pos	Athlete	Nickname	Pld	W	D	L	V
1	Philip Kim (CAN)	"Phil Wizard"	3	3	0	0	51
2	Matías Martínez (CHI)	"Matita"	3	1	1	1	28
3	Onton See (CAN)	"Onton"	3	1	1	1	27
4	Victor Custodio (PUR)	"Choky"	3	0	0	3	2

	Score	
Phil Wizard (CAN)	2–0	Onton (CAN)
Matita (CHI)	2–0	Choky (PUR)
Phil Wizard (CAN)	2–0	Matita (CHI)
Onton (CAN)	2–0	Choky (PUR)
Phil Wizard (CAN)	2–0	Choky (PUR)
Onton (CAN)	1–1	Matita (CHI)

=== Group B ===
The athletes with the two highest votes advance to quarterfinals.

Pos	Athlete	Nickname	Pld	W	D	L	V
1	Jeffrey Louis (USA)	"Jeffro"	3	2	1	0	45
2	Jordan Silva (COL)	"Alvin"	3	2	0	1	37
3	Xavier Mendoza (DOM)	"Dux-M"	3	0	2	1	14
4	Brandon Valencia (MEX)	"Kastrito"	3	0	1	2	12

	Score	
Jeffro (USA)	2–0	Alvin (COL)
Kastrito (MEX)	1–1	Dux-M (DOM)
Jeffro (USA)	2–0	Kastrito (MEX)
Alvin (COL)	2–0	Dux-M (DOM)
Jeffro (USA)	1–1	Dux-M (DOM)
Alvin (COL)	2–0	Kastrito (MEX)

=== Group C ===
The athletes with the two highest votes advance to quarterfinals.

Pos	Athlete	Nickname	Pld	W	D	L	V
1	Miguel Rosario (USA)	"Gravity"	3	3	0	0	47
2	Gilberto Araújo (BRA)	"Rato"	3	2	0	1	36
3	Mariano Carvajal (ARG)	"Broly"	3	0	1	2	14
4	Luis Deolarte (MEX)	"Ninonino"	3	0	1	2	11

	Score	
Gravity (USA)	2–0	Rato (BRA)
Ninonino (MEX)	1–1	Broly (ARG)
Gravity (USA)	2–0	Ninonino (MEX)
Rato (BRA)	2–0	Broly (ARG)
Gravity (USA)	2–0	Broly (ARG)
Rato (BRA)	2–0	Ninonino (MEX)

=== Group D ===
The athletes with the two highest votes advance to quarterfinals.

Pos	Athlete	Nickname	Pld	W	D	L	V
1	Gibrahimer Beomont (VEN)	"Lil G"	3	2	0	1	38
2	Leony Pinheiro (BRA)	"Leony"	3	2	0	1	35
3	Ricky Ordóñez (COL)	"Ricky Rulez"	3	2	0	1	34
4	Nicolas da Fonseca (CHI)	"Daf"	3	0	0	3	1

	Score	
Lil G (VEN)	2–0	Leony (BRA)
Ricky Rulez (COL)	2–0	Daf (CHI)
Lil G (VEN)	0–2	Ricky Rulez (COL)
Leony (BRA)	2–0	Daf (CHI)
Lil G (VEN)	2–0	Daf (CHI)
Leony (BRA)	2–0	Ricky Rulez (COL)

=== Bracket ===
Quarterfinals
Alvin (COL)	0
Gravity (USA)	2
Leony (BRA)	0
Phil Wizard (CAN)	2
Matita (CHI)	2
Lil G (VEN)	0
Rato (BRA)	0
Jeffro (USA)	2

Semifinals
Phil Wizard (CAN)	3
Gravity (USA)	0
Matita (CHI)	0
Jeffro (USA)	3

Gold medal match
Phil Wizard (CAN)	3
Jeffro (USA)	0
Bronze-medal match
Gravity (USA)	1
Matita (CHI)	2
