= Hiroto Ono =

Japanese breakdancer (born 2004)

Personal information
- Born: December 3, 2004 (age 21) Kanazawa, Ishikawa, Japan

Sport
- Country: Japan
- Sport: Breaking

Hiroto Ono (大能 寛飛, Ono Hiroto; born December 3, 2004) is a Japanese breakdancer. He competed in the B-Boys event at the 2024 Summer Olympics.

== Career ==
He began dancing at the age of 9 after being influenced by his younger sister. He won his first international competition at the Bomb Jam Powermove in China in 2019.
