= Danis Civil =

French breakdancer (born 1988)

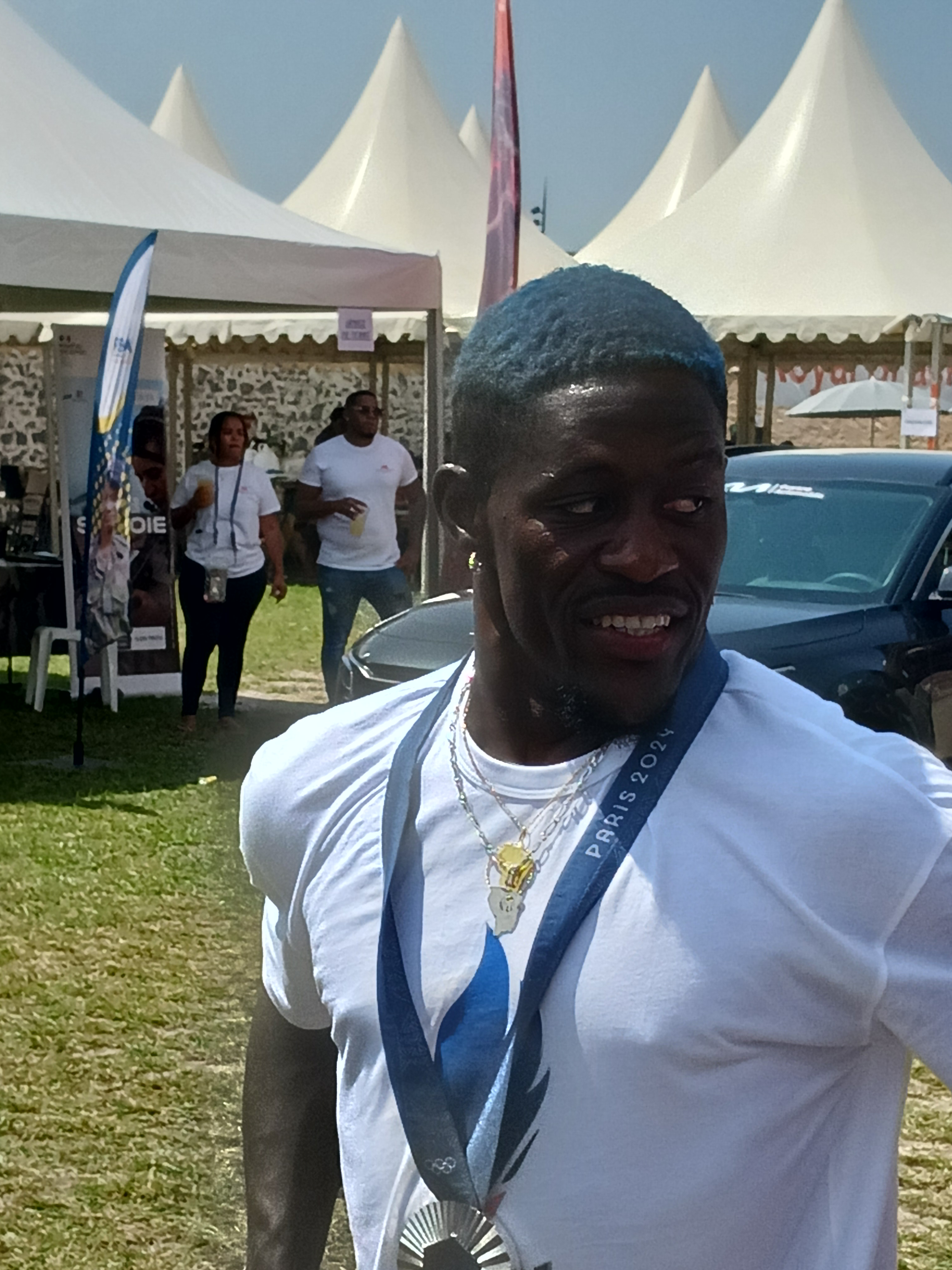
- Civil in 2024

Personal information
- Born: 3 May 1988 (age 38) French Guiana

Sport
- Country: France
- Sport: Breaking
Medal record
Breaking
Representing France
Olympic Games
Silver medal – second place	2024 Paris	B-Boys
European Games
Gold medal – first place	2023 Kraków–Małopolska	B-Boys
WDSF European Championships
Gold medal – first place	2022 Manchester	B-Boys
FUJIFILM INSTAX Undisputed Masters
Runner-up	2022 London	Solo Men
Runner-up	2023 Tokyo World Final	Solo Men

Danis Civil (born 3 May 1988), also known as Dany Dann, is a French breakdancer. He competed at the 2024 Summer Olympics, winning the silver medal in the B-Boys event.

== Life and career ==
Civil was born in French Guiana. In 2022, he was crowned as French breaking champion in Bordeaux, placing fifth at the World Games, then won the gold medal at the 2020 WDSF European Breaking Championship in Manchester.

He won the gold medal in Breaking at the 2023 European Games (team Sanofi), qualifying directly for the Breaking at the 2024 Summer Olympics in Paris.

On August 10, 2024, he won the silver medal at the 2024 Summer Olympics in Paris, losing in the finals to Canadian Philip Kim.
