= Lithe-ing =

Chinese breakdancer (born 2005)

Qi Xiangyu
Personal information
- Native name: 亓祥宇
- Nickname: Lithe-ing
- Born: 25 May 2005 (age 21) Qingdao, Shandong, China

Sport
- Country: China
- Sport: Breaking
Medal record
Breaking
Representing China
World Games
Gold medal – first place	2025 Chengdu	B-Boys
Asian Games
Bronze medal – third place	2022 Hangzhou	B-Boys

Qi Xiangyu (Chinese: 亓祥宇; pinyin: Qí Xiángyǔ; born 25 May 2005), better known by his stage name Lithe-ing, is a Chinese breakdancer. He won the bronze medal at the 2022 Asian Games and the gold medal at the 2025 World Games. He also competed in the B-Boys event at the 2024 Summer Olympics.

== Career ==
In 2023, Lithe-ing made his Asian Games debut, where he won the bronze medal for the men's breakdancing event in the 2022 Asian Games in Hangzhou.

In May and June 2024, Lithe-ing competed in the Olympic Qualifiers Series in Shanghai and Budapest for a spot to compete in the 2024 Paris Olympic Games. He finished in 4th overall in the series. The finish made it high enough to qualify for the games. At the 2024 Olympics, he was assigned to Group A but did not advance to the quarterfinals.

At the 2025 World Games, Lithe-ing made his World Games debut, where he participated in the dancesport competition. In the gold medal match of the B-Boys event, he defeated Issin to win gold.
