= Jeffrey Louis =

American breakdancer

Personal information
- Born: December 20, 1994 (age 31) Houston, Texas, U.S.
- Education: University of Houston
- Height: 5 ft 8 in (173 cm)

Sport
- Country: United States
- Sport: Breaking
Medal record
Breaking
Representing United States
World Games
Silver medal – second place	2022 Birmingham	B-Boys
Pan American Games
Silver medal – second place	2023 Santiago	B-Boys
WDSF Pan American Championships
Silver medal – second place	2023 Santiago	B-Boys
FUJIFILM INSTAX Undisputed Masters
Winner	2025 Tokyo World Final	Solo Men

Jeffrey Louis (born December 20, 1994), also known mononymously as Jeffro (/ˈdʒɛfroʊ/ JEF-roh), is an American breakdancer. He is of Haitian American heritage and has been breakdancing since the age of 12.

== Breakdancing career ==
Louis qualified to compete in breakdancing at the 2024 Summer Olympics.

== Education ==
Louis graduated from Westside High School in Houston. He earned a degree in kinesiology from the University of Houston.
