= Hong 10 =

South Korean breakdancer (born 1984)

Hong10
- Born: Kim Hong-Yul; December 27, 1984 (age 41); Seoul, South Korea
- Occupation: B-boy
- Years active: 1996–present
- Height: 175 cm (5 ft 9 in)
- Dancing career
- Current group: Drifterz (2003–2020); 7Commandoz (2009–); Red Bull BC One All Stars (2010–); Flow XL (2021–)
- Former groups: Expression (2000–2003); Project Soul; Project Korea
- Dances: B-boying
Medal record
Breaking
Representing South Korea
Red Bull BC One World Final
Winner	2006 São Paulo	Breaking
Winner	2013 Seoul	Breaking
Winner	2023 Paris	B-Boys
Runner-up	2005 Berlin	Breaking
Runner-up	2016 Nagoya	Breaking
Olympic Qualifier Series
Bronze medal – third place	2024 Budapest	B-Boys
Asian Games
Silver medal – second place	2022 Hangzhou	B-Boys
Silver medal – second place	2026 Aichi-Nagoya	B-Boys
WDSF Asian Championships
Bronze medal – third place	2023 Hangzhou	B-Boys

Kim Hong-Yul (Korean: 김홍열; born December 27, 1984), better known by his stage name Hong10 or Hongten, is a South Korean breakdancer. He is part of the Korean crew Flow XL (formally known as Drifterz), 7Commandoz worldwide and represents the Red Bull BC One All Stars.

Competing in Breaking at the 2022 Asian Games (held in 2023), he won the silver medal in the B-Boys event. In Breaking at the 2024 Summer Olympics, he finished 11th in the B-Boys event, where he was the oldest competitor at the age of 39. He returned to the Asian Games in 2026, where he won his second consecutive Silver medal for breaking.

== Biography ==
=== Name ===
The name Hong10 comes from a Korean-language homonym and an English-language pun. The second syllable of his name, Yul (although it has often been misspelled as 'Yeol'), has the same pronunciation as the Korean word for the number ten. Therefore, pronouncing the phrase Hong10 in Korean sounds the same as his real name, Hong-Yul. However, his nickname is always pronounced in English, so he is referred to as Hongten regardless of the language context—Korean, English, or otherwise.

Korean	김홍열
Hanja	金洪烈
English	Kim Hong-Yul
B-boy	Hong10 (Hongten)

=== Crew ===
Hong10 was a member of the crew Expression, with which he won the Battle of the Year title in 2002. He is currently part of the crew Drifterz and is involved in project teams called Project Soul and Project Korea, while also performing as a solo dancer. Recently, he and his close friend B-Boy Differ co-founded a crew called 7Commandoz, alongside world-renowned B-Boys Ronnie, Differ, Skim, Wing, Dyzee, and Phil Wizard. A former member, B-Boy Menno, has since left the crew. The members of 7Commandoz are known for their originality and futuristic style.

Hong10 has been one of the Red Bull All Stars since 2010.

He has also represented Jinjo Crew alongside fellow 7Commandoz members

=== Moves ===
Some of his signature moves include the spinning airchair, switching halos, handcuff mills to headspin drills, chair flares, and his signature freeze, the Hong10 Freeze. Hong10 is also known as The King of the Halo Freeze because of his many Hong10 (halo) freeze variations.

=== History ===
He first became a well-known B-Boy in 2002 when he exploded onto the scene as part of the Korean crews that won what were then considered the two most prestigious dance competitions in the world: the Battle of the Year International and the UK B-Boy Championships. He has also excelled in many individual competitions, including as a Red Bull BC One All Star, winning in 2006 in São Paulo, Brazil, and again in 2013 in his hometown of Seoul, South Korea.

At the same time, he has often been referred to as the famous "runner-up," having reached the finals in many competitions, including three times at the UK B-Boy Championships.

In recent years, Hong10 served in the Korean Army following his participation in the prestigious Red Bull BC One Moscow 2011. At the Battle Bled, he lost to B-Boy Finger (France).

Although his military service limited his ability to travel overseas for competitions, he occasionally acted as a judge at many local tournaments and sometimes competed when events were held within South Korea.

After completing his military service, he returned to the B-Boy scene and won the Red Bull BC One title in 2013.

== List of notable achievements ==
Significant achievements in major events are highlighted in bold text. Although Hong has more titles on his name, these are some notable achievements:

=== 2001 ===
- Performance in Dance Dynamite, Japan
- Be.B-Boy, Japan (winner)
- Tokyo Dance Delight, Japan (Runner-up, Performance)
- Hong 10 Vs Juan Diego
- Juan Diego Vs Lil YI Pobre 8)

=== 2002 ===
- Style War, Korea (winner)
- Performance in Big Wax, Japan
- Hip Hop Connection B-boy Master Mixed Battle Vol.1, Korea (winner)
- B-Boy Unit Vol.4, Korea (winner)
- B-Boy Master Championship, Korea (winner)
- Solo battle with Remind in HipHop Connection Vol.3, Korea
- Performance in Dance Dynamite, Japan
- Be.B-Boy, Japan (winner)
- Performance in Asian Comment, Denmark
- Guest battle in Jam 2 The Beat, Denmark
- **Battle Of The Year 2002, Korea (champion)**
- **International Battle Of The Year 2002, Germany (champion)**
- **International UK B-Boy Championships 2002 Solo (runner-up)**
- **International UK B-Boy Championships 2002 Crew (champion)**
- **Freestyle Session Japan (runner-up)**
- Take part in Sony Net.MD TV advertisement, New Zealand
- **Voted Best B-Boy of the Year**

=== 2003 ===
- Distinguished service prize, Honor of Dance 2003, Korea
- Featured on <6'o Clock Focused Issues> MBC TV programme, Korea
- B-Boy Master Mixed Battle Vol.3 Korea (winner)
- Performance in <Big Wax>, Fukuoka Japan
- Hiphop Planet, France (winner)
- Pro-Am Euro, France (winner)
- Judge & Special Guest Battle at the Netherland Tournament

=== 2004 ===
- Performance in <Funky Funky> the musical, Korea
- B-Boy Unit Vol.6, Korea (winner)
- B-Boy Challenge Vol.4, Korea (winner)
- Guest performance at "Breakin Convention", UK
- Guest performance at "Fitness Festival", Italy
- Guest performance "Korea Hip Hop Nite", Taiwan
- Judge of "B-Boy Battle", Taiwan
- Guest performance in the launching show of iPod, Korea
- Performed in the opening of <Korean Broadcasting Awards>, Korea
- **International UK B-Boy Championships 2004 Solo (runner-up)**
- **International UK B-Boy Championships 2004 Crew (champion)**
- **Freestyle Session Korea (champion)**
- B-Boy Challenge Grand Championship, Korea (winner)
- Performance at Nike, Inc. LeBron event, Korea
- Korean representative in "Free Style Session World Final", Japan

=== 2005 ===
- Participation in "Match One's Skill", Korea
- Street Dance Summer Jam, Taiwan (winner)
- Stand-in performance in TV drama <Nonestop>, Korea
- Opening performance for <EBS Robot Battle Korea>, Korea
- Event performance in "Nike 5,6,7,8", Korea
- Yongmasan Battle, Korea (Judge)
- Performance in "Breakin' Convension", UK
- **Red Bull BC One 2005, Germany (runner-up)**
- K.O.B.E, Japan (winner)
- Battle Of The Year South East Asia 2005, Taiwan (Judge)
- Hip Hop World Challenge 1on1, Germany (winner)
- Red Bull Street Battle, Hong Kong (Judge)
- **International UK B-Boy Championships Solo (runner-up)**
- **International UK B-Boy Championships Crew (champion)**
- KMTV Original Move 1on1 vol.7, Korea (winner)
- Motion-capture model for Playstation 2 and PSP-2000 game B-Boy, UK
- Judge of <MBK 3on3 Battle>, Thailand
- **The Notorious IBE 2005** (Korea)

=== 2006 ===
- One Of The Move vol.2, Korea (winner)
- Armory Cup Korea 2006, Korea (runner-up)
- Performance in "Breakin Convension", UK
- SBS "Hope TV" tournament, Korea (winner)
- Judge of "Top of Top", Korea
- Took part in KBS TV commercial, Korea
- Performance in Movement Concert (Drifterz Crew)
- Red Bull Break in Battle, Ireland (runner-up)
- Took part "Vita 500" commercial, Korea
- **UK B-Boy Championships 2006, Korea (champion)**
- **Battle Of The Year 2006, Korea (champion)**
- Performance in <B-Boy Park>, Korea
- Motion-capture model for the game <Groove Party>, Korea
- **International Battle Of The Year 2006 Crew (semi-finals)**
- **International UK B-Boy Championships 2006 Crew (runner-up)**
- **Red Bull BC One 2006, Brazil (champion)**
- Performance Of The Year, Korea (winner)

=== 2007 ===
- B-Boy Unit Vol.9, Korea (runner-up)
- Red Bull Beat Battle (winner)
- **Red Bull BC One 2007, South Africa (semi-finals)**

=== 2008 ===
- Red Bull BC One 2008, France (Judge)
- **The Notorious IBE 2008** (Korea/Japan)

=== 2009 ===
- Jincheon 2009 (winner) (7 Commandoz)
- Battle of the Year, Taiwan 2009 (Judge)
- Battle of the Year, Singapore 2009 (Judge)
- 2-Oh-Sick Usa 2009 (Steven Chhuon, Jovy Neak, Andy Phriep, j-mart, dino dylan)
- **The Notorious IBE 2009** (Korea)

=== 2010 ===
- 2010 Vancouver Battle of T.N.G - Just Battle 3 on 3 (Judge)
- Be.B-Boy, osaka3on3 (winner)
- Be.B-Boy, osaka1on1 (winner)
- **International Battle of the Year 2010, Germany (champion)**(Jinjo )

=== 2011 ===
- Temple O'Style (winner) (7 Commandoz)
- Break The Floor, France (champion) (7 Commandoz)
- **International R-16 Korea 2011 (champion)** (Jinjo )
- Red Bull BC One 2011, Russia

=== 2012 ===
- Road of Street 2 vs 2 (winner)
- **R-16 Korea Korea Eliminations (champion) (Jinjo )**
- International R-16 Korea Solo (quarter-finals)
- World B-Boy Fighterz 2012 1 vs 1
- Red Bull Bc One Crew Vs Crew (Jinjo Crew ) vs (The Happy Best Crew)
- **The Notorious IBE 2012** (Red Bull BC One All Stars)

=== 2013 ===
- **Red Bull BC One 2013, Korea (champion)**

=== 2014 ===
- Red Bull BC One 2014, France
- New Taipei BBoy City 2014 (winner) (7 Commandoz)
- Outbreak Europe 2014 (Judge)

=== 2015 ===
- **Floor Wars 2015, Denmark (champion)** (7 Commandoz)
- Chelles Battle Pro 2015 (Judge)
- **Silverback Open Championships Champion** (7 Commandoz)
- **Silverback Open Championships Solo (semi-finals)**
- **Freestyle Session Champion** (7 Commandoz)
- Red Bull BC One India Cypher 2015 (Judge)

== See also ==
- List of dancers
