= Shigeyuki Nakarai =

Japanese breakdancer (born 2002)

Shigeyuki Nakarai 半井重幸
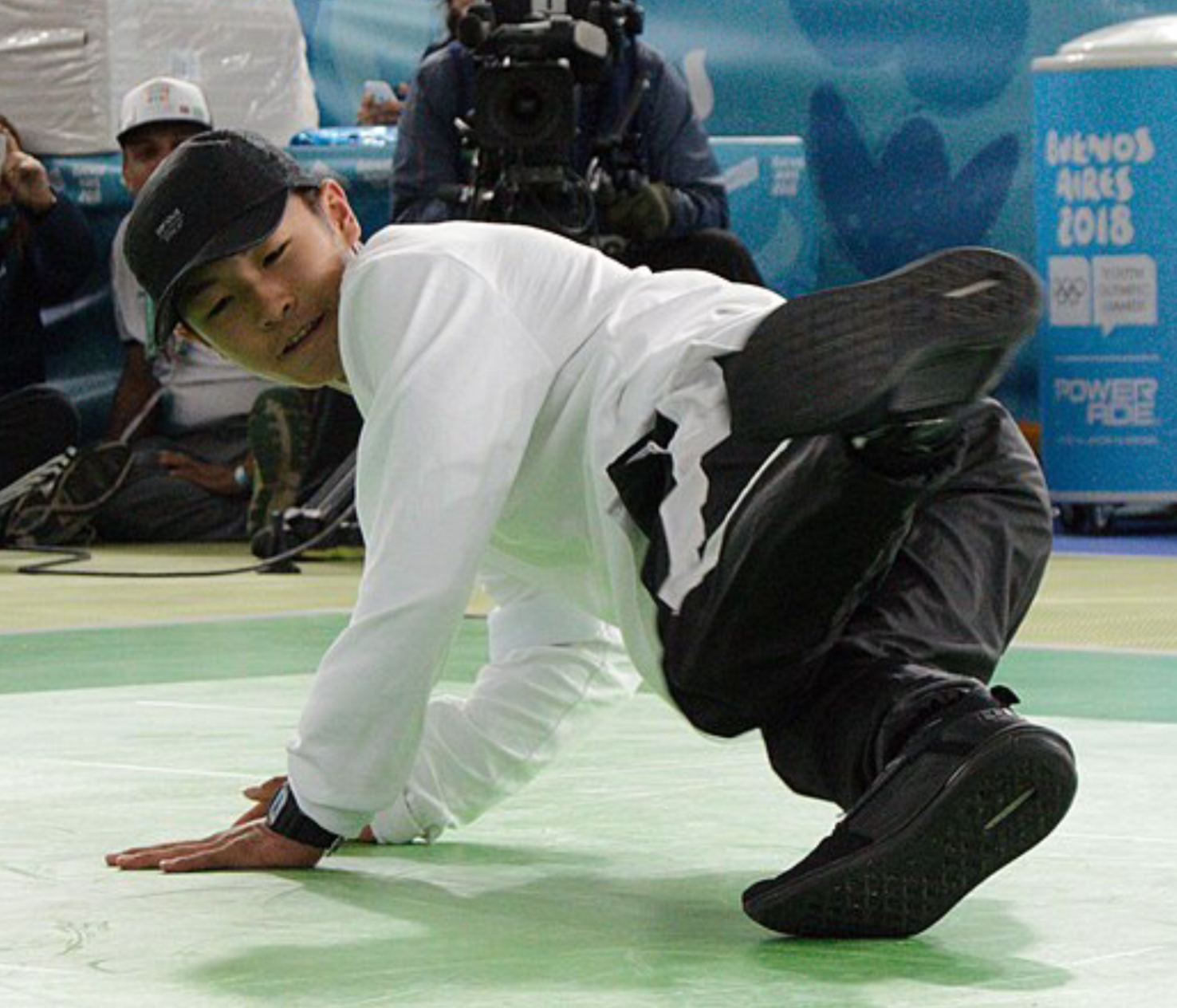
- Nakarai in 2018

Personal information
- Born: 11 March 2002 (age 24) Sapporo, Hokkaido, Japan

Sport
- Country: Japan
- Sport: Breaking
Medal record
Breaking
Representing Japan
WDSF World Championships
Gold medal – first place	2025 Kurume	B-Boys
Silver medal – second place	2022 Seoul	B-Boys
Silver medal – second place	2024 Chengdu	B-Boys
Bronze medal – third place	2023 Leuven	B-Boys
Red Bull BC One World Final
Winner	2020 Salzburg	B-Boys
World Games
Bronze medal – third place	2022 Birmingham	B-Boys
Bronze medal – third place	2025 Chengdu	B-Boys
Asian Games
Gold medal – first place	2022 Hangzhou	B-Boys
Gold medal – first place	2026 Aichi–Nagoya	B-Boys
Youth Olympic Games
Bronze medal – third place	2018 Buenos Aires	B-Boys
WDSF Youth World Championships
Gold medal – first place	2018 Kawasaki	B-Boys

Shigeyuki Nakarai (半井 重幸, Nakarai Shigeyuki; born 11 March 2002), also known mononymously as Shigekix, is a Japanese breakdancer. He participated at the 2022 World Games in the dancesport competition where he won the bronze medal in the B-Boys event. In 2023, he won the gold for the men's breakdancing event in the 2022 Asian Games in Hangzhou, and a day later, was chosen to be Japan's flag bearer in the closing ceremony of the games. On July 1, 2024, the Japanese Olympic Committee designated him and the female fencer Misaki Emura as the flag bearers to the París 2024 Olympic Games.

Olympic Games
Preceded by Rui Hachimura; Yui Susaki	Flagbearer for Japan; París 2024; With: Misaki Emura	Succeeded by Incumbent
