= Philip Kim (breakdancer) =

Canadian breakdancer (born 1997)

Phil Wizard
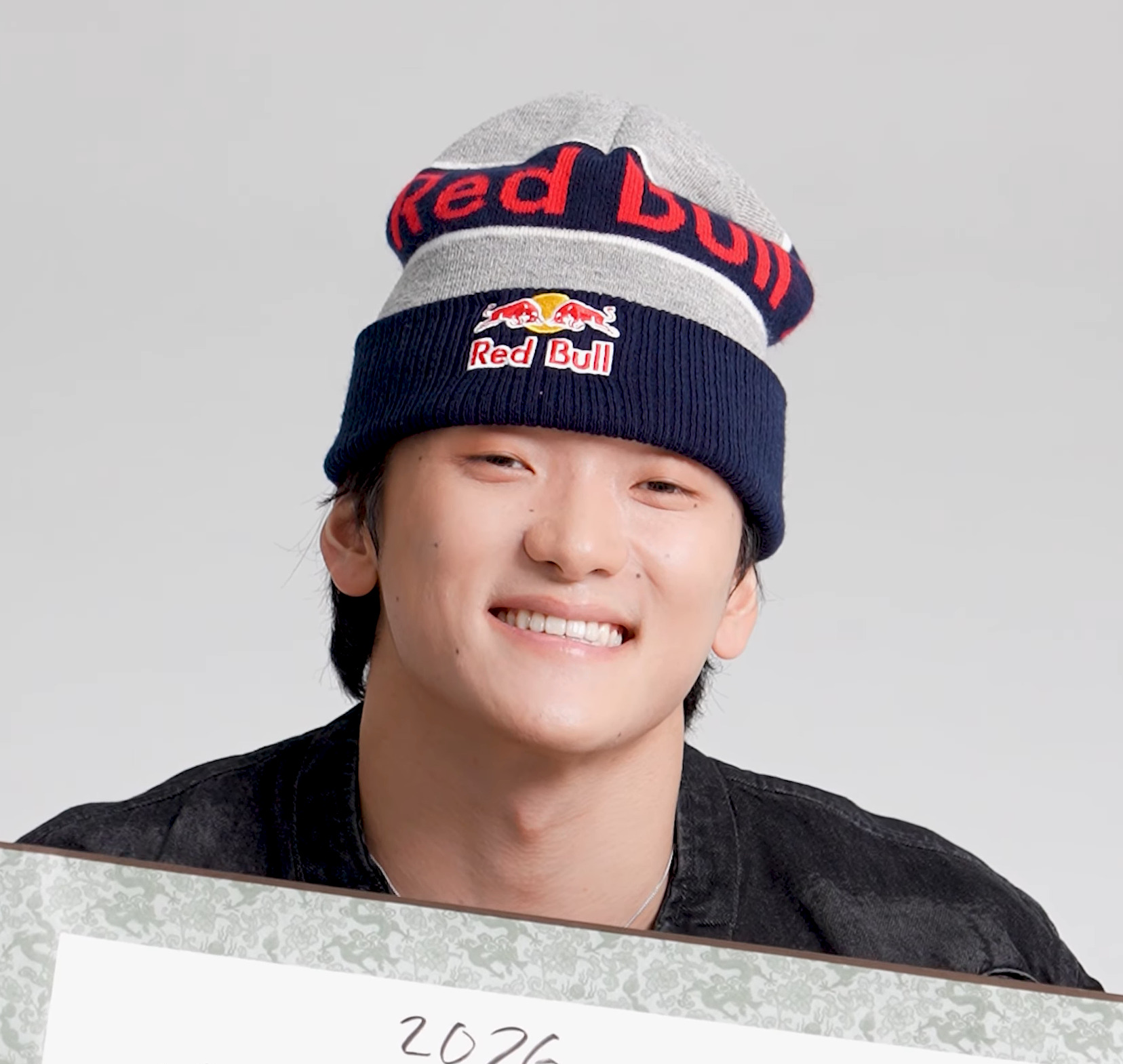
- Kim in 2025

Personal information
- National team: Canada
- Born: January 25, 1997 (age 29) Toronto, Ontario, Canada

Sport
- Country: Canada
- Sport: Breaking
Medal record
Breaking
Representing Canada
Olympic Games
Gold medal – first place	2024 Paris	B-Boys
WDSF World Breaking Championship
Silver medal – second place	2021 Paris	B-Boys
Gold medal – first place	2022 Seoul	B-Boys
Silver medal – second place	2023 Leuven	B-Boys
Pan American Games
Gold medal – first place	2023 Santiago	B-Boys
WDSF Pan American Breaking Championship
Gold medal – first place	2023 Santiago	B-Boys

Philip Kim (born January 25, 1997), also know as Phil Wizard, is a Canadian breakdancer. He is the men's 2024 Summer Olympic gold medal winner and 2022 World champion in the discipline.

== Early life ==
Kim was born to Korean parents in Toronto, Canada. He attended Magee Secondary School in Vancouver, where he frequently excused himself from classes to go to the bathroom to try new moves and practice in the hallway. He briefly attended university before dropping out to pursue breaking full time.

== Career ==
Kim's love of breaking began in 2009, when he saw the Now or Never (N.O.N.) crew performing street shows in downtown Vancouver. His stage name was given to him by accident: after consistently being introduced as ‘Phil from the Wizards crew’ people eventually began to shorten it to 'Phil Wizard'. He has since admitted that the name would not have been his first choice.

In 2015, Phil Wizard entered the inaugural Canadian Red Bull BC One national championship with a chance to qualify for the North American competition, which led to the World Championship. However, he lost to Fléau of Montreal in the final round of the Toronto competition.

Kim won the gold medal at the 2022 WDSF World Breaking Championships in Seoul, South Korea, beating out more than 250 competitors for his world title. In 2023, Kim won gold at the WDSF Pan American Breaking Championship in Santiago, Chile followed by silver at the 2023 WDSF World Breaking Championship.

In 2022, Phil traveled to Seoul, Korea to train with Hong 10, focusing on stamina for competitions. After training, they engaged in a 23-minute battle, completing 17 rounds before Phil conceded.

In August 2023, Kim was named to Canada's 2023 Pan American Games team.

Kim won gold in the inaugural 2024 Olympic Breakdancing competition.

== Personal life ==
Kim lives in Vancouver, British Columbia.
