= Oleh Kuznietsov =

Ukrainian breakdancer (born 1990)

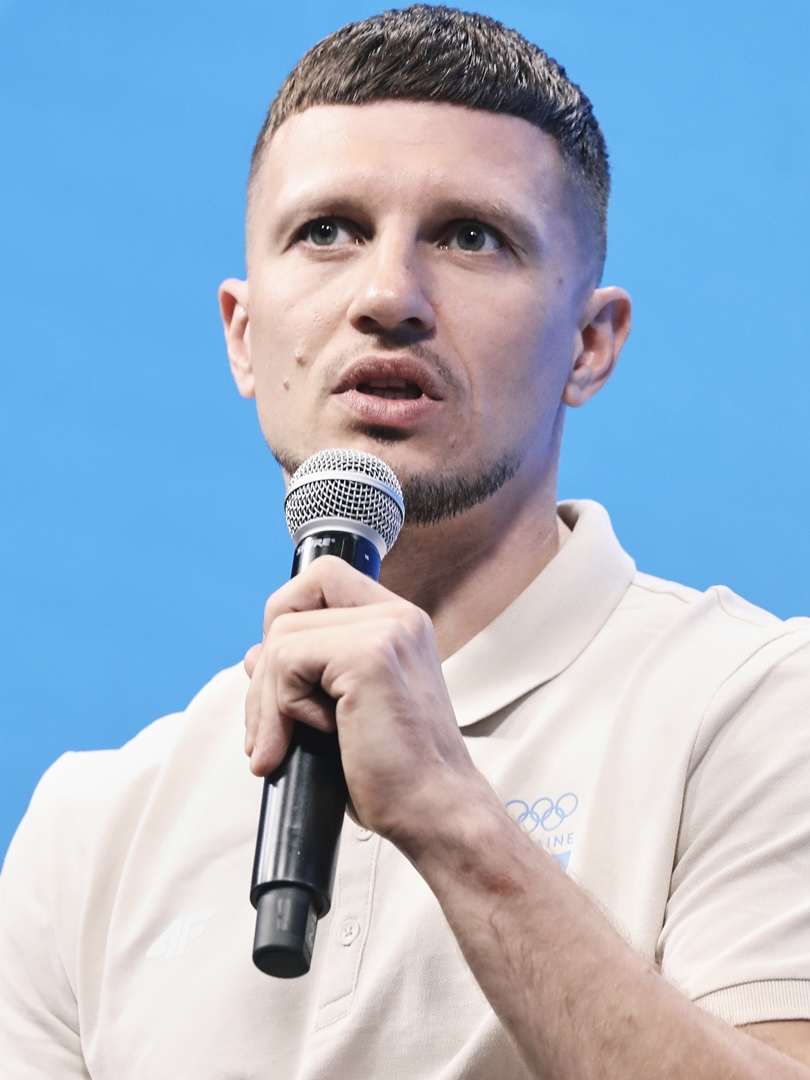
- Kuznietsov in 2024

Personal information
- Born: 23 July 1990 (age 35) Kyiv, Ukraine
Medal record
Breaking
Representing Ukraine
Outbreak Europe
Winner	2016	1vs1 Breaking
Winner	2023	2vs2 Breaking

Oleh Kuznietsov (Ukrainian: Олег Кузнєцов; born 23 July 1990) also known as B-Boy Kuzya, is a Ukrainian breakdancer who competed at the 2023 European Games, where he reached quarterfinals, and at the 2024 Summer Olympics. He finished 4th at the 2022 World Championships in Seoul.
