= Gongshu Canal Sports Park Gymnasium =

Sports venue in Hangzhou, China

- Address: Hangzhou; China
- Capacity: 6928

Construction
- Opened: 2021
- Architect: Archi-Tectonics

Website
- https://www.hangzhou2022.cn/

The Gongshu Canal Sports Park Gymnasium is a multipurpose stadium built for the 2022 Asian Games. The centre covers 58,395 square meters, has a floor area of 8,697 square meters and seats 6,928. It was completed in 2021. It is intended to host table tennis events during the games and paralympic games and serve as a performing arts center after the games end.

== Features ==
The gymnasium's irregular oval shape is inspired by the jade cong from Liangzhu culture. Its shape combines seating schemes of sports arenas and amphitheaters, to convert the gymnasium into an event space after the games. It features steel and glass diagrid walls resembling fish scales.

== Usage ==
The gymnasium passed the 2022 Asian Games acceptance criteria in November 2021.

Though the 2022 Asian Games were delayed from September 2022 to October 2023, the gymnasium was opened to the public in July 2022. It has since received over 10,000 visitors.

During the Asian Games, the gymnasium will host table tennis and breakdancing events.
