= Sun Chen (breakdancer) =

Taiwanese breakdancer (born 1999)

Personal information
- Nickname: Quake
- Born: 21 September 1999 (age 27) Hsinchu, Taiwan
- Education: University of Taipei

Sport
- Country: Chinese Taipei
- Sport: Breaking

Sun Chen (Chinese: 孫振; pinyin: Sūn Zhèn, born 21 September 1999) is a Taiwanese breakdancer. Nicknamed "Quake", he competed for Chinese Taipei at the 2022 Asian Games and later qualified for the 2024 Summer Olympics, where he served as the Taiwanese co-flag bearer.

== Biography ==
Sun was born on 21 September 1999, in Hsinchu, Taiwan, on the day of the deadly Jiji earthquake; as such, his breakdancing nickname is "Quake". He is the youngest of three children and was homeschooled until college. In 2010, the film Step Up became popular in Taiwan; according to the Central News Agency, it "triggered a fad that had the older guys in the neighborhood practicing moves on paperboards, and Sun felt he had to get involved." He said that "I wasn't making any friends if I didn't join them," and so he enrolled in a breakdancing class that year.

Sun enrolled at the University of Taipei for its street-dance department. He won a U18 championship in Australia in 2017 and gained attention in 2019 by rising to a world ranking of 8th. He placed top four at the 2019 Paris BattlePro tournament and top eight at the 2019 OutBreak Europe. In 2020, Sun won the Red Bull BC One Taiwan tournament, and he defended his Taiwan title in 2021. The following year, Sun participated in the team event at the FISE de Montpellier. He competed at the Asian Games in 2023. He placed 15th at the Budapest qualifiers for the 2024 Summer Olympics, but had a combined score from a previous event that led to him qualifying for the Olympics, in the first time breakdancing was featured at the games. He was selected as the Taiwan co-flagbearer at the Olympic opening ceremony, along with Tai Tzu-ying. At the Olympics, he was eliminated in the preliminary round of 16 after placing third in his group. After appearing in the 2024 Olympics, Sun became the first Taiwanese breakdancer to reach the final of The Notorious IBE, and won the 1 vs 1 competition in the 2024 edition of Outbreak Europe.
