= Amir Zakirov =

Kazakh breakdancer (born 1997)

Personal information
- Nickname: B-Boy Amir
- Born: 10 October 1997 (age 29) Petropavl, Kazakhstan

Sport
- Country: Kazakhstan
- Sport: Breaking
Medal record
Breaking
Representing Kazakhstan
WDSF World Championships
| Bronze medal – third place | 2021 Paris | B-Boys |
Red Bull BC One World Final
| Winner | 2021 Gdańsk | B-Boys |
Olympic Qualifier Series
| Silver medal – second place | 2024 Budapest | B-Boys |
FUJIFILM INSTAX Undisputed Masters
| Winner | 2022 The Notorious IBE | Solo Men |

Amir Zakirov (Kazakh: Әмір Вадимұлы Зәкіров; born 10 October 1997) is a Kazakh breakdancer. After winning multiple breakdancing competitions, including the 2021 Red Bull BC One, he qualified for the 2024 Summer Olympics. He was named to the Forbes Kazakhstan 30 Under 30 list in 2022.

== Biography ==
Zakirov was born on 10 October 1997 in Petropavlovsk, Kazakhstan. He grew up in a small Kazakh city and enjoyed dancing, but there were limited opportunities for him to do so. He self-trained in parkour before discovering a breakdancing class in 2009. Olympics.com noted:

One day while walking home from school he saw a poster advertising a breaking school. Sensing this was his chance he ripped the poster off the wall and brought it home to his parents. "I stole this poster so that other people wouldn't see it," Amir recalls remembering how much the discovery meant to him.

Zakirov was signed up for classes, using limited money he had from selling copper. When it became insufficient, he resorted to using the money his parents gave him for school lunch to take classes; he noted "I used the money my parents gave me for lunch in school to pay for the breaking. Because of this I had stomach pains from not eating all day, making it really hard to concentrate in school, but I wanted to use this money for breaking." Eventually, the teacher allowed him to attend for free.

At age 16, Zakirov graduated from school and moved to Omsk in Russia, then to Moscow aged 20. In Russia, he joined the club Predatorz and PDVL crew. In 2020, he won the Legits Blast tournament in Prague. He opened 2021 by winning the Unbreakable championship and the Kazakhstan Cypher tournament. Later that year, he won the Red Bull BC One championship. He competed at the world championships in 2022 and received selection that year to the Forbes Kazakhstan 30 Under 30 list. He won the Breaking for Gold tournament in Japan in 2023. Zakirov competed at the 2024 Olympic Qualifier Series and qualified for the 2024 Summer Olympics, which featured breakdancing for the first time.
