= B-boy Issin =

Japanese breakdancer (born 2005)

B-boy Issin Bboy issin
Personal information
- Born: 1 May 2005 (age 21) Okayama, Okayama, Japan

Sport
- Country: Japan
- Sport: Breaking
Medal record
Breaking
Representing Japan
Red Bull BC One World Final
Winner	2025 Tokyo	B-Boys
WDSF World Championships
Gold medal – first place	2024 Chengdu	B-Boys
World Games
Silver medal – second place	2025 Chengdu	B-Boys

Issin Hishikawa (菱川 一心, Hishikawa Isshin; born 1 May 2005), better known by his stage name B-boy Issin or simply Issin, is a Japanese bboy. He is a member of "Body Carnival Zoo" and "Red Bull BC One All Stars." He won the WDSF World Breaking Championship in 2024 and the silver medal at the 2025 World Games.

== Career ==
At the age of 8, Hishikawa was inspired by his older sister, a jazz dancer, to discover breaking. In 2017, he competed in the U-15 division of the Battle of the Year, winning as a sixth-grader. From then on, he has competed in numerous competitions, both individually and as a team, building a solid track record.

In 2018, Issin joined Body Carnival Zoo, the junior crew of Body Carnival, one of the world's most prestigious crews. In 2022, he won the Red Bull BC One Cypher Japan. That same year, he competed in the Red Bull BC One World Final in New York, achieving a Top 4 finish in his first appearance, instantly making his name known around the world.

In 2023, Issin signed a contract with Red Bull and became a member of the Red Bull BC One All Stars, an exclusive dance team selected exclusively for breakdancers who have achieved outstanding results in Red Bull BC One. In 2023, he competed in the Red Bull BC One World Final for the second consecutive year, garnering attention for his fierce semi-final battle that got the crowd excited. In December of the same year, he defeated some of the world's best competitors in the final match of the World Series, which determined a spot in the Olympic Qualifying Series, to win the gold medal.

In May and June 2024, Hishikawa competed in the Olympic Qualifiers Series in Shanghai and Budapest for a spot to compete in the 2024 Paris Olympic Games. Hishikawa finished in 7th overall in the series. The finish would have been high enough to qualify for the games, however due to a quota limit of two breakers per NOC, as well as B-boy Hiro10 (also representing Japan) finishing at a higher ranking than him, he was unable to qualify for the games.

In 2024, Issin won the JDSF All Japan Breaking Championship, which determines the best breakdancer in Japan, and continued his momentum by achieving his long-awaited victory at the DANCEALIVE 2024 FINAL. Later in December, at the WDSF World Breaking Championship, Issin won the gold medal in the b-boy category.

At the 2025 World Games, Issin participated in the dancesport competition where he won the silver medal in the B-Boys event. Later that year, he won the Red Bull BC One championship.
