= Concerns and controversies at the 2024 Summer Olympics =

Numerous concerns and controversies arose leading up to and during the 2024 Summer Olympics, which were held in Paris, France. Major concerns included security, Israel's participation amidst the Gaza war, and the inclusion of Russian and Belarusian athletes as neutrals amidst the Russian invasion of Ukraine. Despite the nominal Olympic Truce, both conflicts contributed to the complex political backdrop of the Games.

== Domestic organizational issues and controversies ==
=== The Seine in the opening ceremony ===
A portion of the 2024 Summer Olympics opening ceremony took place on the Seine. This was the first time such an opening ceremony was held on a river, which raised several concerns and spectator capacity was halved to ensure security.

French officials intended to use the Seine, a public outdoor space, to make the opening ceremony accessible to more people than usual. In 2022, Minister of the Interior Gérald Darmanin proposed a reduction from the initial estimate of 600,000 spectators along the Seine. In February 2024, the French government announced that the number of spectators would be reduced from 600,000 to 300,000 as a security precaution. A security perimeter around the area designated for spectators was to be erected in the days leading up to the Games, limiting public access. Tourists and pedestrians were not allowed to watch the ceremony from the Seine. Spectators were still allowed to register for free tickets. In July 2024, it was reported that 220,000 spectators were expected and 45,000 police and security officers would be present.

Part of the security plan for public viewing spaces around the Seine included removing bouquinistes, traditional booksellers with distinct riverside boxes, from the banks of the Seine. The booksellers strongly campaigned against their boxes being moved, even if they were forced to close for the ceremony. President Emmanuel Macron intervened, preventing the boxes from being moved and requesting a different security plan. Macron described the bouquinistes as part of the city's "living heritage".

=== Terror threats ===
==== Preparations ====
In March 2024, French Interior Minister Gérald Darmanin met with intelligence services to assess the terrorist threat to the country after an attack on a Moscow concert hall raised security fears for the Games. The Moscow attack was carried out by ISIS-K. French security services considered this an intelligence blind spot prior to the attack, and worked to expand their intelligence network ahead of the Games.

On 22 May, an 18-year-old man from Chechnya was arrested on suspicion of planning to attack matches during the Olympic football competition held in Saint-Étienne. In June, Recorded Future released a report stating that, despite a high likelihood of cyberattacks, the greatest risk to the Games would come from in-person threats.

==== Fake threat videos ====
A video showing Hamas threatening to attack the Olympics was shared on social media in the days before the opening ceremony. Hamas denied involvement, and Microsoft's Threat Analysis Center determined the video to be Russian disinformation. The video appeared to originate from the same Russian disinformation group responsible for previous fake videos purporting to be Hamas and was consistent with the Russian smear campaign previously identified by Microsoft.

==== Russian spy ====
On 24 July, French authorities arrested Kirill Gryaznov, a Russian national suspected of "planning to destabilize the Olympics". A former reality TV star who later became an FSB spy, Gryaznov was a 40-year-old chef who had lived in France for 14 years. French authorities did not believe he posed a terror threat, but that he had been involved in long-term espionage and a plot with foreign powers to commit a "large scale […] destabilization" act. The raid of his property and his subsequent arrest were authorized after authorities tapped his phone in May and heard him speaking to Russian intelligence services about plans relating to the opening ceremony.

=== Disruption to residents of Paris ===
Concerned that the Games would disrupt their day-to-day lives, polls showed that over half of Parisian residents planned to leave the city, and three-quarters were worried about transportation and security issues. The Head of the Paris Olympics Organizing Committee, Tony Estanguet, reportedly said, "There will be some disruptions, but it will also be a rare, magical moment."

=== Strike actions and worker protests ===
Thousands of trade unionists in France said that they would disrupt the Olympics with strike actions, with the General Confederation of Labour filing a strike notice covering the entire period of the Olympic and Paralympic Games.

French airport workers' unions demanded that the management group operating Parisian airports recruit more staff and give bonuses to staff working during the busy Olympic period. To pressure the group, the unions called for strike action on 24 July 2024, the first day of the Games and two days before the opening ceremony. The action was called off after three unions agreed to a deal for bonuses before the strike date.

On 22 July 2024, the dancers set to perform in the opening ceremony protested by lifting their fists, in a gesture resembling the black power salute, instead of rehearsing. This was reportedly a protest against "low pay and poor working conditions" for people across France. The dancers belonged to the Union of Performing Artists (SFA), and a union representative said its members were dissatisfied and "regret to have to announce the filing of a strike notice" for the days of the Olympic and Paralympic Games opening ceremonies. The SFA noted that many of the 3,000 people set to perform in the ceremony would either receive low wages or would not be paid. Dancers called off the strike ahead of the opening ceremony.

On 25 July, the staff of the Hôtel du Collectionneur, where IOC officials were staying, held a two-hour strike in protest of having received no pay raises for seven years. The strike occurred after negotiations on 24 July did not result in an agreement. The IOC intended to host various dinners and meetings at the hotel and were wary of further strike action.

=== Hijab ban for French athletes ===
The French government's secularism policies were called into question by activists, who specifically opposed a decision by the French National Olympic and Sports Committee to prohibit French athletes from wearing religious symbols—including hijabs—during the Olympics. The ban only applied to members of the French team and did not impact other delegations at the Games.

Sounkamba Sylla, a member of France's 4 × 400 m women's relay team, alleged that she had been barred from participating in the opening ceremony due to her wearing a hijab. It was reported that Sylla had agreed to a compromise allowing her to wear a cap instead. Muslim Australian boxer Tina Rahimi spoke out against the French team's stance on religious symbols, stating that it was "so unfortunate for the athletes in France because it has nothing to do with your performance, and it should not get in the way of you being an athlete."

=== French identity in promotional materials ===
The mascots for the Games were The Phryges, anthropomorphic Phrygian caps. Plush toys of the mascots were produced and advertised by French companies. However, the manufacturing sector of these companies was mostly located in China, which became a subject of criticism in France.

In March 2024, the Olympic poster for the Summer Olympics was revealed: a surrealist cartoon rendering of Paris with several landmark buildings and symbols of the city and the country. Detractors believed that the poster art removed symbols of Christianity and French identity. Several right-wing French politicians criticized it for being "woke" and described it as attempting to "cancel" France's history or being ashamed of having national pride. The largest complaint was that the depiction of the Dome des Invalides, part of a monument to France's military history, did not include the cross on the top.

=== Safety concerns ===
==== COVID-19 outbreaks ====
There was an outbreak of COVID-19 among aquatic athletes at the Games. On 24 July, it was reported that five members of Australia's women's water polo team had tested positive for COVID-19. Team Australia chef de mission, Anna Meares, stated the cases were limited to the water polo team and that standard respiratory illness protocols had been put in place. On 29 July, British swimmer Adam Peaty tested positive for COVID-19 after displaying symptoms the previous day, before he took part in the 100 m breaststroke final, and Australian swimmer Lani Pallister tested positive on July 30, pulling out of her race that day. Though it was not mandated, swimmers and coaches began wearing face masks at venues. The confirmation of Peaty and Pallister's positive tests was followed by reporting later on 30 July that three other swimmers, two from the US and one from Romania, had contracted COVID-19, with the Americans having been relocated to a hotel. More than 40 athletes tested positive for COVID-19 at the 2024 Summer Olympics across multiple competitions. They were permitted to compete if asymptomatic, in contrast to the strict rules implemented at the 2020 Summer Olympics and the 2022 Winter Olympics.

==== Recall of branded water bottles ====
A series of Olympic-branded reusable water bottles for children, which had been licensed but not produced by the organizers, were recalled a week before the Games began, due to excessive levels of Bisphenol A, which has been banned in France since 2015.

==== Security concerns ====
A news report in The Times cited an analysis by Dragonfly, a security and geopolitical firm, by which the level of terror threats for the Paris 2024 Games remained "severe", including the potential use of bombing drone attacks. It was reported that the British Olympic Association would provide an app to athletes and staff, so they could have access to instant help and the ability to share their location with security staff.

The main airports in Paris were closed on 26 July during the opening ceremony of the Olympic Games for security reasons. Security perimeters were set up around the event venues, strictly restricting the movement of cars, including taxis.

A petty thief, known to Paris police for stealing bags on public transport, stole the bag of a member of Paris Town Hall staff containing some security plans for the Olympic Games. It was later confirmed that no sensitive information was in the bag, and the thief was sentenced to seven months in jail.

=== Raids of organizing headquarters ===
French financial prosecutors raided the Paris 2024 Olympics headquarters on 18 October 2023 and targeted event management firms. The raids were part of an investigation opened into suspicion of "illegal taking of interest, favoritism and concealment" involved in awarding various contracts.

=== Alleged Azerbaijani smear campaign ===
A report from France's external digital interference-fighting body uncovered that several Azerbaijani websites and fake social media profiles attempted a disinformation campaign, expressing doubt in France's ability to organize the Games and threatening a boycott. The smear campaign is believed to be in retaliation for repeated French criticism of Azerbaijan since 2020 following the outbreak of conflict in Nagorno-Karabakh.

=== Crime in Paris ===
==== Safety of Australians ====
On 19 July 2024, a 25-year-old Australian female tourist was gang-raped by five men in Paris. Team Australia chef de mission, Anna Meares, said "Our hearts go out to the woman involved and we hope she's being cared for and supported after the trauma that she's experienced". Two staffers from Australia's Nine Network suffered injuries from an attempted robbery when walking to their accommodation in Le Bourget. As a result of this incident and the gang rape of the Australian tourist, Meares encouraged Australian athletes not to wear their team uniform when leaving the Olympic Village on their own.

==== Argentina football team training base robbery ====
On 25 July 2024, Argentina men's soccer coach Javier Mascherano said the team's Olympic training base had been robbed before its loss to Morocco on Wednesday. Midfielder Thiago Almada's watch was among the items stolen. The next day the prosecutor's office of nearby Saint-Étienne published that the Argentina delegation had filed a police complaint in Lyon.

==== Theft of Indonesian badminton team manager's bag ====
On 5 August 2024, a bag belonging to the manager of the badminton national team, Armand Darmadji, was stolen from a rental car in Paris. The stolen bag contained €53,000 in cash, a passport, and a credit card. Darmadji was in the car with his colleague Shendy Puspa Irawati when the suspected thief informed Irawati about a flat tire. Darmadji went to check the tire, and at the same time, Irawati went to a nearby store. After contacting the car rental company and asking the police about their location, Darmadji returned to the car and found that the bag was no longer in the car.

=== Global IT outage ===
The IT operations of the Olympics were hampered by a global IT outage on 19 July 2024, due to a faulty update provided by CrowdStrike, causing computers that were running Windows to experience the "Blue screen of death". The outage occurred a day after the Olympic Village opened, as organizers were processing the arrivals of athletes and delegates. The organizing committee said that a contingency plan was activated and that only the delivery of uniforms and accreditations was affected. The incident did slow down operations: the accreditation desk at the press centre was closed and security checks were done manually using a list of names.

== Political and human rights issues ==
=== Exploitation of workers ===
French newspaper Libération reported that migrant workers at construction sites were paid around €80 ($86.7) per day without any official declaration, social security, or resting day. Some workers expressed anger and dissatisfaction because they had not received the salary guaranteed in their contracts, and others said that there were no proper safety materials for high-risk jobs.

=== Forceful eviction of migrant camps ===
In April, migrants from several makeshift camps in Paris were evicted forcefully from their homes, in what aid groups called a campaign of "social cleansing" ahead of the Summer Olympics.

=== Elections amid preparations ===
A month before the Games, the 2024 French legislative election was held on 30 June and 7 July 2024. This election followed the dissolution of the National Assembly by President Emmanuel Macron, and came in the aftermath of the 2024 European Parliament election in France, in which the far-right National Rally and the left-wing New Popular Front won huge majorities. Olympic officials were largely unconcerned with the potential threat posed by a far-right government. Michael Payne, former head of marketing at the IOC, told AFP the level of support for the Olympics politically during the ongoing torch relay suggested "the Olympics themselves are not going to be caught in any political crossfire."

== Inclusion of nations involved in wars ==
=== Participation of Russian and Belarusian athletes ===
==== Potential for neutral athletes ====
Flag of the Individual Neutral Athletes at the 2024 Summer Olympics

The potential participation of Russian and Belarusian athletes remained controversial amid the Russian invasion of Ukraine. In February 2022, the International Olympic Committee (IOC) recommended that sports federations ban Russian and Belarusian athletes and officials from participating in international tournaments, citing the violation of the Olympic Truce.

In January 2023, the IOC announced plans to allow Russian and Belarusian athletes to compete as neutrals. On 26 January 2023, The Olympic Council of Asia invited Russian and Belarusian athletes to compete in the Hangzhou 2022 Asian Games, under a neutral flag and without the possibility of winning medals or winning Asian quota places for the Olympic Games. The IOC also published a statement stating that it supported the return of Russian and Belarusian athletes, as long as they did not "actively" support the war and as long as their flag, anthem, colors and organizations were excluded (thus preventing them from competing under the Russian Olympic Committee as in Tokyo 2020 and Beijing 2022). The IOC also compared the situation to the Independent Olympic Participants at the 1992 Summer Olympics.

On 1 February 2023, the United Nations released a report, commending the IOC for considering reinstating Russian and Belarusian athletes and stating that "no athlete should be required to take sides in the conflict."

On 31 January 2024, Russian President Vladimir Putin announced that the Russian Olympic Committee and the Ministry of Sport would make the decision on whether Russian athletes would participate in the 2024 Olympics. In the end, the country's leadership stated that Russia itself would not boycott the Games, leaving the decision to individual federations. None of the Russian broadcasters purchased Olympic TV rights for the first time since 1984.

==== Threatened boycotts from other nations ====
On 3 February 2023, the National Olympic and Paralympic Committees of the five Nordic countries (Denmark, Finland, Iceland, Norway and Sweden) issued a joint statement opposing the participation of Russian and Belarusian athletes at the 2024 Summer Olympics in Paris. Countries which had threatened a boycott over this issue included Denmark, Estonia, Latvia, Lithuania, Poland and Ukraine.

That month, the IOC president, Thomas Bach, stated that it should not be up to national governments to decide who gets to participate in international sporting tournaments. On 22 March 2023, Bach further reiterated his support for reinstating Russian and Belarusian athletes, opposing "any suggestion that Russians should be treated as if they have collective guilt".

==== Sporting federations' recognition and designation of athletes ====
On 10 March 2023, the International Fencing Federation (FIE) became the first Olympic governing body to officially reinstate Russian and Belarusian athletes and officials in time for the start of the qualification for the 2024 Games. Protesting this decision, Denmark, France, Germany and Poland cancelled upcoming World Cup fencing events to prevent Russians and Belarusians from participating. In April 2023, it was revealed that the European Fencing Confederation had sent a critical letter to the FIE, outlining their opposition to the FIE's plans to strip the countries that had indicated they would not grant visas to Russians and Belarusians of their hosting rights and impose sanctions on them.

As of May 2023, after the International Canoe Federation (ICF) reinstated Russian and Belarusian athletes, the number of summer sport international federations to do so had risen to 10.

==== ROC suspension ====
In October 2023, the IOC suspended the Russian Olympic Committee (ROC) due to violations of the Olympic Charter. The suspension stemmed from the ROC's incorporation of Ukrainian sporting bodies from annexed Ukrainian territories, undermining the integrity of the Ukraine Olympic Committee. Russia challenged this in the Court of Arbitration for Sport, but the appeal was rejected in February 2024. This worsened tensions between the IOC and ROC, with Thomas Bach saying in March 2024 that Russia only had itself to blame. He strongly criticized the decisions of Russian politicians and the systemic doping of athletes by the Russian state.

=== Participation of Israeli athletes ===
==== IOC view on Israeli participation and Palestinian protests ====
The participation of Israeli athletes became a point of contention following the outbreak of the Gaza war. The IOC warned Arab and pro-Palestinian athletes that they would be banned from participating if they refused to compete with Israeli athletes, recalling the case of Algerian judoka Fethi Nourine, who was suspended for 10 years by the International Judo Federation for refusing to fight Israeli athlete Tohar Butbul during the 2020 Summer Olympics. An IOC spokesman stated "The IOC is committed to the concept of individual responsibility and athletes cannot be held responsible for the actions of their governments," adding that the IOC will "ensure that swift action is taken, as during the Olympic Games Tokyo 2020." The Israeli Olympic officials expected protests, booing, as well as the potential that some athletes or teams would refuse to play against Israel.

Palestinian sports organizations and sports organizations from Arab countries called for sanctions to be imposed against Israel and for the IOC to prevent its participation in the 2024 Summer Olympics due to the war. These calls were prompted by anger over the deaths of Palestinian athletes in the war and Israel's destruction of Palestinian sports facilities. Some said athletes from Israel should be treated like those from Russia and Belarus, who were banned following the former's invasion of Ukraine and whose participants were only allowed under the Individual Neutral Athletes (AIN) label.

In January 2024, over 300 Palestinian sports clubs called for Israel to be barred from the 2024 Olympics after Israeli airstrikes had killed Palestine's Olympic football team coach and damaged the headquarters of the Palestine Olympic Committee in Gaza.

In March 2024, IOC president Thomas Bach stated that there was no issue regarding Israeli participation at the 2024 Summer Olympics. Paris Mayor Anne Hidalgo stated, "Sanctioning Israel in relation to the Olympic and Paralympic Games is out of the question because Israel is a democracy." French president Emmanuel Macron also defended the decision to include Israel, stating that "Israel responded to a terrorist attack" by Hamas, and that "this is not a war of aggression".

On 19 July, the International Court of Justice ruled that the Israeli presence in occupied Palestinian territories was "unlawful" and called on Israel to end its occupation, as well as cease the construction of settlements in said territories. The ruling led to renewed calls for Israel's removal from the Games.

==== Double standard accusations against the IOC ====
In November 2023, Russia accused the IOC of having double standards because it had not sanctioned Israel for its military actions in Gaza. The IOC's response was that the measures taken against Russia and Belarus resulted from their violation of the Olympic Truce, Russia's violation of the Olympic Charter following their annexation of four Ukrainian Olympic councils, and Russia's two previous violations of the Truce in 2008 and 2014. American academic and former professional soccer player Jules Boykoff described the double standards as "glaring" and questioned the IOC's treatment of Israel compared to Russia stating, "If taking over sports facilities are a red line, why silence as Israel converts Gaza's historic Yarmouk Stadium into an internment camp?". Boykoff also stated that Israel's various settlements in the West Bank, East Jerusalem and the Golan Heights "would be in clear violation [of the Olympic charter] in the same way as what Russia has done".

==== Security for Israeli athletes ====
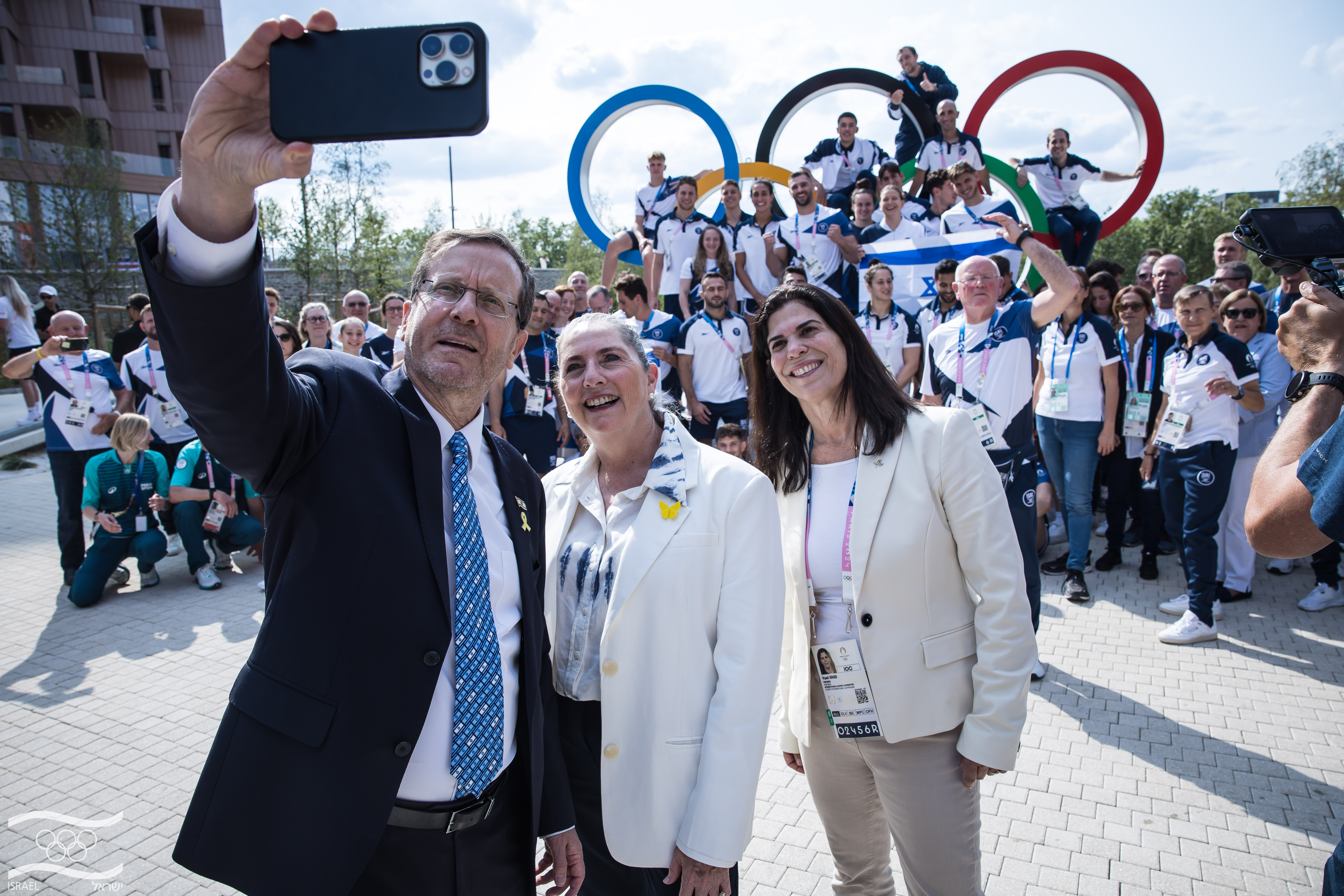
Israeli President Isaac Herzog with Israeli athletes in the Olympic village in Paris, 24 July 2024

Israel's sports minister, Miki Zohar, said that they knew of threats towards their athletes, with Yaakov Peri saying that the threat would be heightened due to France's antisemitism. In 2024, Israel doubled its security budget for the Games and said that Shin Bet, Israel's domestic security intelligence agency, would send agents to Paris: 88 athletes and their staff would have security details provided by Shin Bet, though Zohar said not every athlete would have a personal bodyguard. Israel planned for the Shin Bet agents to be armed. In response to the suggestion that threats directed at Israeli athletes had increased, a spokesperson for the IOC said that athletes in general receive threats regularly, and that it was common for the Israeli delegation to receive them.

There were reportedly calls for anti-Israel demonstrations to happen during the matches of the Israel Olympic football team. There had already been concern expressed that the Israeli football team might have to play in stadiums around France and stay outside the high-security Olympic village. The organizers confirmed that, since the Munich massacre, there have always been special measures to make Israeli delegations feel comfortable, but that they would add even more security. The Search and Intervention Brigade, which has been France's tactical task force since the Munich massacre, was set to be "patrolling fans" during Israel's matches, including at the Parc des Princes in Paris on the first day of matches (24 July). Drones were also to be used to monitor the grounds.

In May 2024, Israel prevented its wrestling delegation from traveling to a qualifying event in Türkiye due to alleged security concerns, therefore disqualifying the delegation from the 2024 Olympics. Approximately one week earlier, Türkiye had barred all imports and exports from Israel.

==== Statements by French politicians ====
In February, 26 French politicians and lawmakers sent a letter to the IOC, urging sanctions against Israel and calling for a ban on Israeli athletes competing under their flag and anthem. The lawmakers cited Israel's alleged war crimes in the Gaza Strip as the reason for their stance. They proposed that Israeli athletes participate neutrally, similar to Russian and Belarusian athletes, during the Games.

On 22 July, French MP Thomas Portes faced widespread backlash after he stated Israeli athletes were "not welcome" at the Games and called for protests against the Israeli delegation.

=== Participation of Afghan athletes ===
Afghanistan's participation in the 2024 Summer Olympics became uncertain after the country fell under Taliban control in August 2021. The Taliban had banned women from playing sports since retaking the country. Friba Razayee, the first female judoka in Afghanistan's history to participate in the 2004 Summer Olympics, called on the International Olympic Committee to ban Afghanistan from participating in the 2024 Summer Olympics, which would have been the first ban for the country since 1999 during the first Taliban takeover of the country. The IOC Executive Board announced that it would allow Afghanistan to send a mixed-gender team to the 2024 Summer Olympics. The International Olympic Committee said Afghanistan would field a gender-balanced team at the 2024 Summer Olympics and that Taliban government officials would not be allowed to attend. The team comprised 3 men and 3 women. The Taliban refused to recognise the female participants.

=== Participation of Iranian athletes ===
There were calls to ban Iran from the 2024 Summer Olympics due to human rights abuse allegations following the executions of Iranian wrestler Navid Afkari and national karate champion Mohammad Mehdi Karami, crackdowns on protesters and athletes during the Mahsa Amini protests, the blinding of archer Kowsar Khoshnoudi-Kia, and the defection of taekwondo medallist Kimia Alizadeh. A group of Iranian dissidents including Franco-Iranian boxer Mahyar Monshipour and Nobel Peace Prize winner Shirin Ebadi sent a letter to the IOC calling for Iran to be banned; they opined that the country's prohibition of women from practicing sports like wrestling, boxing, swimming, and sailing was not in line with the Olympic Charter. American senator Marsha Blackburn petitioned IOC President Thomas Bach in March 2024 to ban Iran from the Paris Games.

The IOC expressed serious concerns over the situation of the Iranian athletes and urged the Iranian Olympic Committee to take appropriate action to protect the athletes and members of the Olympic community from harm and oppression. The IOC said that it reserved the right to take any appropriate action relating to the participation of the Iranian NOC and athletes in regards to the 2024 Summer Olympics.

== Environment, health and safety concerns ==
The Paris Olympics were widely touted as being environmentally sustainable, with some members of the organizing committee claiming the Games will be the "greenest" ever held.

=== Judges' tower for surfing in Tahiti ===
The surfing competitions were held in the French Polynesian island of Tahiti, and a nine-ton aluminum tower was constructed for the judges. Criticism was drawn from locals and surfers, saying that it threatened damage to the coral reef and that the currently existing wooden tower could be used. A barge struck the reef and damaged it in 2023, which caused construction to be paused. Multiple surfers protested against its construction, and a local petition against building it gathered 239,000 responses.

=== Paris bedbug infestation ===
The 2023 Paris bedbug infestation caused concerns amongst locals and government officials about the heavy influx of visitors to the city and the risk of another outbreak during the Olympics.

=== Tiger mosquitoes ===
In March 2024, there was a concern in France that tiger mosquitoes, which can carry and spread dengue fever, might be a threat to the Olympic Games. The games fell in the mosquito's high season. The mosquitoes were also able to carry a number of other diseases such as chikungunya, yellow fever and zika virus. There was a similar concern at the 2016 Summer Olympics in Rio de Janeiro about the potential spread of zika virus.

=== Temperature concerns ===
==== Air conditioning units in the Olympic Village ====
Despite the Olympic Village accommodations being designed to be environmentally friendly, the water-based geothermal cooling system meant to be implemented was rejected by several National Olympic Committees (NOCs) as ineffective. The organizers said that the system, paired with the "passive building design", would keep the accommodation 6 °C cooler than the outside temperature; the NOCs did not dispute this, but said that this would not be sufficient given the forecast high temperatures. NOCs including the United States, Germany, Italy, Great Britain, Canada, and Australia, announced that they would be providing their athletes with air conditioning units for their personal use to help them withstand the heatwave. This move was initially perceived as undermining the environment messaging of the hosts. At the start of July 2024, the organizing committee began offering air conditioning unit rentals to NOCs for an extra fee. As weather got hotter during the Games, organizers were accused of "creating a two-tier Games", where NOCs who could afford their air conditioning units could provide better conditions for their athletes, while athletes from other NOCs were stuck in overheated rooms because the organizing committee had not installed it in all rooms as usual.

==== Health concerns for participants ====
The Paris 2024 Olympic Games were set to be the hottest on record, an increase on the previous Games in Tokyo, during which athletes had already expressed health concerns. In June 2024, a report titled "Rings of Fire: Heat Risks at the 2024 Paris Olympics" documented concerns, and the IOC proposed mitigation measures. Athletes set to compete in 2024 continued to express concerns about the risks of competing in athletics in extreme temperatures, and also about the normality of extreme temperatures. Sebastian Coe, the president of World Athletics, emphasized that heatwaves would pose a risk to athletes' sleep and training, and for heat-related illness and injury while competing. Proposals to mitigate the heat included rescheduling events to avoid the hottest times of day, and to improve athletes ability to rehydrate and implementing cooling plans. At the Games, ice vests and hand fans were used to combat the heat.

=== Water pollution of the Seine and uncertain role in the wider Games ===
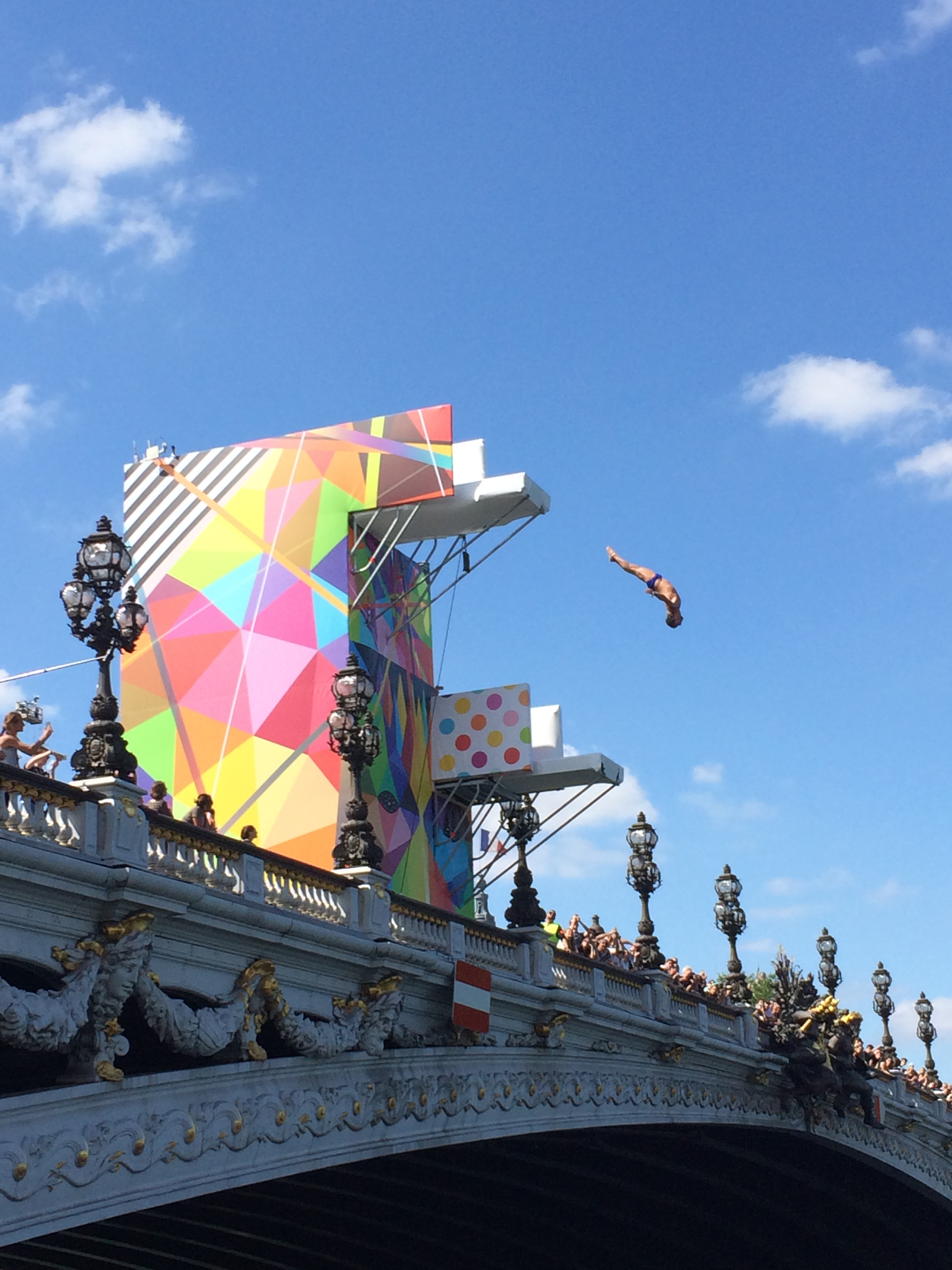
A diver jumping from Pont Alexandre III into the Seine as part of "Olympic Days Paris" in June 2017

The River Seine was planned to serve as the site of two Olympic events: open water (marathon) swimming and the swimming leg of the triathlon. It had been used for swimming events at the 1900 Summer Olympics in Paris, but swimming in it has been banned since 1923 due to harmful bacteria, such as E. coli. In 2017, divers used the Seine in an exhibition event while Paris campaigned to host the Games. Ahead of the Games a dedicated clean-up operation costing $1.5 billion took place to make the Seine safe to swim in. Test events in 2023 had to be cancelled due to a sewer problem creating unsafe water, and heavy rainfall in the spring of 2024, which sent polluted overflow into the river, was also a cause for concern. In the months before the start of the 2024 Games, the river consistently failed mandated testing for bacterial levels, with many concerned that athletes could become ill if they swam in the river. The clean-up operation involved an overhaul of the Seine's infrastructure – with "new underground pumps, pipes and tanks" installed to collect spillover wastewater and prevent it going into the river – as well as improving sewage treatment plants in the city and requiring moored boats to use the sewage network for their wastewater drainage.

Despite the repeated test failures, organizers continued to insist that the Seine would be used, and would be safe to use, for the events. In mid-July, they did concede that there were contingency plans in place, with the first option being to postpone the Seine-based events to later in the Games. If that became unfeasible, the marathon swim would be relocated to Vaires-sur-Marne Nautical Stadium, where rowing and canoeing were planned to take place, and the triathlon would have the swimming leg removed and become a duathlon. 220 Triathlon Magazine said that cancelling the swim "would feel unconscionable".

Paris mayor Anne Hidalgo and President Macron both vowed to swim in the Seine prior to the Games to prove that the extensive clean-up operation worked. A late June date for this swim was postponed; the primary reason cited was the concurrent French general election, but reports also circulated that protestors had planned a mass defecation event to coincide with the swim. On 12 July, two weeks before the start of the Olympics, Paris City Hall announced that the Seine had been clean enough for twelve days, also noting that the bacteria (including E. Coli) levels in a designated spot in central Paris had fallen within acceptable limits for four consecutive days. On 13 July, Sports Minister Amélie Oudéa-Castéra briefly swam near Pont Alexandre III for a television crew from BFM TV, and Hidalgo, along with Tony Estanguet and Marc Guillaume, swam in the Seine near Hôtel de Ville on 17 July.

Triathlon swimming training for triathletes to become familiar with the water conditions, which was scheduled for 28 July, had to be cancelled when the Seine's water quality dipped below acceptable levels again, blamed on heavy rainfall in the preceding days. Training was cancelled again the next day, meaning there would be no familiarization swims, which was criticized by triathletes. The men's triathlon was due to take place on 30 July, but postponed to 31 July to be run along with the women's triathlon; organizers said there was a 60% chance of them taking place that day.

After the men's and women's triathlons took place on the same day on 31 July, practice swims for the mixed relay triathlon were postponed and could not take place before the race on 5 August. Triathletes who competed in the individual events also took health precautions: Great Britain gave their triathletes hepatitis jabs and a course of antibiotics. On 3 August, a Swiss triathlete who became ill with a stomach infection and was removed from their mixed team; on 4 August, the Belgian team had to pull out of the mixed relay triathlon, as one of their triathletes had become ill, initially reported to be with E. Coli but was later confirmed by the blood tests to be a viral infection.

=== Ice production criticism ===
The organizers of the Games ordered around 650 tonnes of ice to be used for ice therapy at the Olympic and Paralympic Games. Initially, they had planned to obtain 1,624 tonnes, but nobody was able to produce this amount. The large order was criticized over claims that ice therapy is not proven to be widely effective, excessive or improper use can be harmful, for its high monetary cost, and particularly for being harmful to the environment. On the day before the opening ceremony, academics from France and other countries published an editorial in the British Journal of Sports Medicine criticizing the excessive ice, writing that "The amount of energy and water needed to produce, store, and transport the ice is not good for the planet". The scale was particularly criticized: around 64 tonnes of ice was used at the 2020 Olympics, about one-tenth the amount ordered in Paris.

== Controversies during Olympic qualifications and selections ==
=== Chinese doping allegations ===
On 20 April 2024, The New York Times revealed that 23 members of the Chinese swimming team had tested positive for trimetazidine seven months prior to the start of the 2020 Summer Games, but were allowed to participate in the games with some of the swimmers winning medals. Following the publication of the report, Travis Tygart, CEO of the United States Anti-Doping Agency, accused the World Anti-Doping Agency (WADA) and the China Anti-Doping Agency (CHINADA) of covering up doping by Chinese swimmers.

Eleven of the 23 swimmers involved in the controversy were named to the 2024 Chinese Olympic swimming team. World Aquatics said that the Chinese swimmers had been tested an average of 21 times, compared to four times for Australian swimmers and six times for American swimmers, since 1 January 2024. Also, including tests conducted by other organizations, there were 4,774 samples collected from the Chinese swimming team. Drug-testing data in 2023 from the International Testing Agency showed that Chinese swimmers were tested more often than swimmers of any other nationality even before news of their positive tests were made public.

According to University of Canberra academics Tracey Holmes and Catherine Ordway, WADA did not initially accept CHINADA's findings at face value and requested the entire case file so it could conduct its own investigations–which included speaking with the drug manufacturer on the latest science for TMZ, and comparing the Chinese positive tests with TMZ cases in other countries. WADA said at an April 2024 press conference that the swimmers testing positive to non-performance-enhancing amounts of TMZ were all at one hotel and that there were fluctuating negative and positive results for the swimmers who were tested on multiple occasions, which was not consistent with deliberate doping techniques. WADA also reported that there have been several cases of meat contamination in the United States, where complex contamination scenarios were acknowledged. Ordway also pointed out that Australian swimmers in Paris who set Olympic records faced no challenges, and emphasized that no country should impose a level of scrutiny on foreign athletes that it would deem "completely repugnant and unacceptable" if applied to its own athletes.

CHINADA, who had reported the results to WADA and FINA (now World Aquatics), stated that the contamination was from a hotel kitchen, a rationale that potentially exempts findings from being made public.

The Association of Summer Olympic International Federations issued a statement in July 2024 lambasting the U.S. for what it saw as attempts to "undermine the role and independence" of WADA, adding that "[the] US' extraterritorial investigation raises doubts about the personal safety of athletes, sport officials and representatives of international sport organizations and the confidence with which they may travel to the US for international sporting competitions". WADA responded by stating, "The (politicization) of Chinese swimming continues with this latest attempt by the media in the U.S. to imply wrongdoing on the part of WADA and the broader anti-doping community.

Former Chinese diver Gao Min said in a post on Chinese social media platform Sina Weibo that the Chinese swimmers' poor performance in the games was due to excessive drug testing they underwent. Chinese swimmer Qin Haiyang said the tests "come early in the morning before we're even awake, during midday rest periods, forcing us to rest on hotel lobby sofas, and even late at night, keeping us up past midnight". The heightened level of testing led Qin Haiyang to state, "This proves that the European and American teams feel threatened by the performances of the Chinese team in recent years. Some tricks aim to disrupt our preparation rhythm and destroy our psychological defence. But we are not afraid. With a clear conscience, we do not fear slander. My teammates and I will resist the pressure and win more medals to silence the sceptics". Wang Xue'er told a reporter from the Mandarin service of Radio Free Asia that the drug tests were okay, while Chinese swimmer Zhang Yufei said the frequent tests did not affect her much but she just felt a bit annoyed when they occurred at 5 a.m.

During the Olympics, British swimmer Adam Peaty questioned China's performance, alluding to the alleged cover-up of positive doping cases by Chinese swimmers and expressing dissatisfaction with the World Anti-Doping Agency's efforts to combat cheating in sports. American swimmer Caeleb Dressel emphasized the need to put trust in WADA and said that he was mainly focused on swimming well, acknowledging that China were the better team.

=== American doping allegations ===
American sprinter Erriyon Knighton was provisionally suspended by the United States Anti-Doping Agency (USADA) after testing positive for a metabolite of the anabolic steroid Trenbolone (category S1 on the banned list, substance not specified). This suspension jeopardized his participation in the US Olympic trials. Following a lengthy investigation, Knighton was cleared in June after an independent arbitrator concluded that the positive result was due to the consumption of trenbolone-contaminated meat, thus allowing him to take part in the US trials. The week after the Olympics ended, the Athletics Integrity Unit launched an appeal with the Court of Arbitration for Sport (CAS) against USADA's decision regarding Knighton's positive drugs test.

In July 2024, it was revealed that US artistic swimmer Calista Liu had tested positive for dorzolamide, a form of eye drops meant to treat glaucoma that can also be used as a masking agent to hide the use of steroids. USADA announced that an independent arbitrator had concluded that Liu would be given a no-fault violation, as she came into contact with dorzolamide from using her father's pillows and bedding, where he administered his prescribed dorzolamide eye drops. The substance can be absorbed through the skin and remain in the blood for up to four months. Travis Tygart commented: "Of course, we follow the rules and find a violation and publicly announce the case, but the unfair treatment of non-cheating athletes in these cases must motivate stakeholders to reform the system to account for the increases in the sensitivity of laboratory detection, particularly for long-lasting substances. This is especially true now knowing the current rules are not evenly enforced on others."

On 7 August 2024, WADA accused USADA of having permitted athletes caught doping to compete as undercover agents in order to identify other drug cheats. WADA stated that it discovered at least three cases of athletes who had violated anti-doping rules and were permitted to compete for years while serving as undercover agents for USADA. In one instance, despite admitting to doping, an elite American athlete who participated in international events held in the United States was not punished and was allowed to continue competing until retirement.

On 8 August 2024, the China Anti-Doping Agency (CHINADA) strongly urged that an independent investigation be conducted into the matter.

=== Bans on transgender women and regulations on intersex athletes ===
In 2022, World Aquatics banned transgender women from women's categories, with global organizers of both rugby codes also having done so in 2020 and 2022. A similar decision was taken by World Athletics in March 2023, banning all athletes who had been through male puberty from competing in women's categories. The group voted on the changes, with World Athletics president Sebastian Coe acknowledging the decision was controversial and would affect the rights of transgender women. Nevertheless, Coe stood by the decision. Shortly after the decision, the journal Science shared a report including analysis from researchers into transgender participation, who all felt their findings suggested no inherent advantage. The report acknowledged there is minimal research, and World Athletics said that a lack of conclusive evidence either way was a reason that the ban needed to be implemented. Researchers Eric Vilain and Joanna Harper felt that World Athletics had not taken a science-based approach to their decision.

Coe said that World Athletics felt the need to prioritize "fairness for female athletes above all other considerations" (referring to cisgender female athletes), but promised to set up a working group to consult with transgender athletes and said he would be open to voting on the matter again. A year later, in March 2024, Coe instead said that the ban would be "here to stay" regardless. The ruling meant that trans prospective Olympic athletes would no longer be able to qualify or compete, with some affected athletes feeling "hounded" just for wanting to participate in sport while not sacrificing their identity, like anyone else. LGBTQ+ advocacy group Stonewall said in February 2023 that transgender people "have every right to participate in sports", with Athlete Ally also saying that the decision actually went against the principle of fairness and was exclusionary and discriminatory.

The decision also included further restrictions on cisgender female athletes with disorders of sex development (DSD), expanding the events that restrictions apply to and requiring athletes to have met new requirements for six months before being allowed to compete, and for two years before being able to participate in international competition: 13 athletes with DSDs had to miss the 2023 World Athletics Championships, a world-ranking event that directly impacts potential for Olympic qualification, and thus missed the Olympics.

=== Disqualification and reinstatement of Ukrainian fencer ===
In July 2020, the FIE (Fédération Internationale d'Escrime - International Fencing Federation) had replaced its previous handshake requirement with a "salute" by the opposing fencers, and wrote in its public notice that handshakes were "suspended until further notice." Nevertheless, in July 2023 Ukrainian four-time world fencing individual sabre champion Olga Kharlan was disqualified at the World Fencing Championships by the FIE for not shaking the hand of her defeated Russian opponent, though Kharlan instead offered a tapping of blades in acknowledgement. The next day, the IOC president Thomas Bach sent a letter to Kharlan, where he expressed empathy for her and said that in light of the situation, she was being guaranteed a spot in the 2024 Summer Olympics.

=== Great Britain women's football qualifying group ===
The British Home Nations (England, Scotland, Wales and Northern Ireland) compete in association football individually, but field a combined Great Britain women's Olympic football team. (Note: Great Britain elects not to attempt to qualify a men's team, with certain historic exceptions.) Qualifying events are still played separately, with England representing Great Britain. The European qualification tournament for the 2024 Summer Olympics saw England play fellow Home Nation Scotland to qualify, with Great Britain's qualification ultimately coming down to England scoring as many goals as possible against Scotland in the last group match. The system allowing this scenario to happen was heavily criticized, and there were some suggestions that Scotland may throw the match, as this would allow them (as part of Great Britain) to have a chance to qualify. England won the match 6–0, but Great Britain did not qualify.

=== Great Britain triathlon selection ===
Great Britain is one of the most successful nations in Olympic triathlon, including at least one gold medal at every Games since it hosted in 2012. Their selection process is described as "the toughest selection criteria in the world". For the 2024 Games, British Triathlon awarded automatic spots to triathletes who earned automatic qualification by the end of September 2023 (thus needing to, at least, win the Olympic test events), with the remaining quota being filled by internally selected triathletes based on complex criteria. The process was criticized by Tim Heming of 220Triathlon Magazine, who said that the remaining triathletes having to "prove their worth" in 2024, rather than preparing for the Olympic Games, was unnecessarily disruptive. When Sophie Coldwell was left out of the team, despite placing higher in the final event than Kate Waugh, she appealed the decision; the appeal was upheld, with the panel re-assessing before coming to the same decision in June. Heming opined that if the last race was not going to be a decider, the panel should have selected Waugh earlier to give everyone time to prepare.

=== Dutch selection of Steven van de Velde ===
The Dutch Olympic Committee, NOC*NSF, selected Steven van de Velde to represent them in beach volleyball. Van de Velde pleaded guilty in 2016 to three counts of raping a 12-year-old child in the United Kingdom. The British judge said that he should not be able to continue his Olympic ambitions. He had initially fled to the Netherlands after the rapes, which took place in 2014, before being extradited back to the UK in 2016.

When asked about the decision to select Van de Velde, Michel Everaert, the head of Nederlandse Volleybalbond (NeVoBo; Dutch Volleyball Federation), said that "[Van de Velde] was convicted at the time according to English law and he has served his sentence. [...He] has now been fully reintegrated into the Dutch volleyball community" and "[is] an exemplary professional and human being". Sentenced on 21 March 2016 to four years in prison, he was transferred to the Netherlands due to an extradition treaty, where he was re-sentenced under Dutch law and subsequently released on 17 March 2017. Comments he made upon his release were criticized by the British child protection charity NSPCC as showing no remorse and being full of self-pity.

In June 2024, NeVoBo described the conviction as a "black period" and said Van de Velde was "obviously not happy" about it being brought up ahead of his appearance at the Olympics. NeVoBo said that they have a professionally guided process for convicted criminals to partake in sport, and that Van de Velde met all their conditions and followed all guidelines for Olympic participation. The IOC refused to comment. There was significant criticism directed at NOC*NSF for the selection. Advisors on safety in sport said the Dutch nonchalance towards the selection was concerning, and that Van de Velde's participation "sends a dangerous message that medals and money mean more than [the] safety [of minors in sports]." A non-profit that supports survivors of sexual abuse criticized Dutch sports media for a lack of attention on Van de Velde, especially when compared to how much the same media reported on inconsequential news, like footballer Memphis Depay's choice of headwear.

The British Olympic Association "raised serious concerns" when Van de Velde was confirmed, and the Australian Olympic Committee later said that a convicted rapist would never be allowed to be involved with their team, due to their safeguarding rules. The Dutch Olympic Committee faced international criticism. In a statement on their website, NeVoBo criticized foreign media outlets for "rekindl[ing] the past". A petition on the online platform Change.org called for the convicted athlete to be disqualified from the Paris Games. The petition had been signed more than 90,000 times before Van de Velde's first match. On 17 July, NOC*NSF said that Van de Velde would not stay in the Olympic Village but would be provided alternative accommodation and security elsewhere. In the statement, the NOC*NSF stated that it regretted "the impact of the unforeseen renewed attention to anyone facing trauma from sexual offences and cross-border behaviour." On 25 July, leaders of anti-violence organizations called for the IOC to investigate how Van de Velde was allowed to be selected. When he debuted at the Games on 28 July, his name being announced was met with audible booing from the crowd as well as typical announcement applause. Fans at the stadium asked about him by the BBC were largely disapproving that he was allowed to compete, with the exception of Dutch fans, many of whom opined that he had served his sentence.

=== French selection of Wilfried Happio ===
French hurdler Wilfried Happio was accused of domestic violence in 2020 and of sexual assault in 2022, being arrested for the latter; both charges were dismissed in court. Happio was selected to the French team for the 2024 Games and became one of the faces of its promotion. In July 2024, there were further allegations of domestic violence made about him, dating to 2018 and 2019. Following the allegations, the French Athletics Federation (FFA) reported Happio to the public prosecutor, and announced that they would hold an internal investigation but that Happio was presumed innocent and still part of the French team. The Ministry of Sports and Olympics said that they would investigate alleged incidents that took place at Happio's residence at INSEP. A statement from Happio made through his lawyer denied the allegations and said he regretted the timing of them, as he needed peace to prepare for the Olympics.

=== Filipino fencer omission and nationality change ===
The circumstances of Maxine Esteban's sporting nationality change from Philippines to the Ivory Coast were subject to controversy. The move was approved by the Philippine Fencing Association (PFA), which waived the three-year waiting period requirement, allowing her to compete for the African nation immediately.

Esteban competed at the 2022 World Fencing Championships in July but suffered a knee injury. Although she was reported to have recovered by the beginning of 2023, the injury rendered her unable to participate in qualifiers for both international and national events, costing her a place in the Philippine national team.

She was removed from the Philippine national fencing team pool on the pretext of non-participation in the qualifiers. This was despite an alleged approved written excuse letter that permitted her to skip training and local qualifiers while recovering from surgery while retaining her spot in the team. Esteban alleged other Filipino fencers retained their respective spots despite also skipping qualifiers.

In April 2024, the PFA reasoned that it was obliged to send only Samantha Catantan to the qualifiers based on merit (results since 2017) and noted the waiver it had given to Esteban for her sporting nationality change. In response, Esteban insisted her removal was unjust and expressed sadness that her former teammate's name was dragged into the controversy.

=== Dutch golf selection controversy ===
On 17 June, the final qualification list for the men's golf event was announced. While Joost Luiten, ranked No. 40 in Olympic qualifying and No. 147 in the Official World Golf Ranking, was eligible for the event, the Dutch Olympic Committee (NOC*NSF) declined to submit his name. The reason given was that Luiten, along with Darius van Driel and Dewi Weber, was not ranked highly enough to be considered a realistic medal contender. Per a criterion change in late 2023, male Dutch golfers would have to finish in the top 27 in ranking to be considered eligible by the NOC*NSF. Luiten challenged the ruling in court, with a Dutch judge ordering that Luiten be added to the 60-man Olympic field. The IOC declined to expand the field to 61 golfers (Luiten's place in the event had already been re-allocated on 28 June, four days before the NOC*NSF re-submitted Luiten's name in compliance with the court ruling). On 13 July, Luiten was named an Olympic alternate for the 60-man field.

During the proceedings, many outlets criticized the NOC*NSF's decision and criteria, noting that at the 2020 Summer Olympics, Rory Sabbatini and Pan Cheng-tsung both medalled in the men's event, despite their pre-tournament ranking being lower than Luiten's ranking in 2024.

=== Absence of Richard Carapaz ===
In May 2024, it was announced that Jhonatan Narváez would take the sole road cycling quota place for Ecuador, meaning that the defending road race gold medallist Richard Carapaz would miss the Olympics. While Carapaz publicly congratulated Narváez, he also claimed in several interviews that the Ecuador Cycling Federation had favored Narváez and ensured that he would represent the nation. The federation released a number of statements denying Carapaz's allegations.

=== Social media reaction to Caitlin Clark omission ===
On 8 June, Shams Charania of The Athletic reported that WNBA rookie Caitlin Clark would not be selected for the US women's 5x5 basketball team. The news, and subsequent confirmation of the report on 11 June, was met with widespread backlash on social media. Clark, who has been credited with a significant increase in interest in women's basketball, had won a number of medals within Team USA's youth system but had no senior team experience prior to the Olympics. On 11 June, USA Basketball released a statement about Clark's exclusion, citing her lack of senior team experience as the primary reason that she did not make the team. Clark herself later addressed the news, expressing her support for Team USA and stating that missing the Olympics would serve as "just a little more motivation" for herself going forward.

=== Disruption of tennis schedule and withdrawal of top-10 players ===
The decision to hold the Olympic tennis tournament at Stade Roland Garros, the home of the French Open, was criticized by several high-profile tennis players and ultimately led several highly ranked players, such as Aryna Sabalenka and Ons Jabeur, to withdraw from the tournament. Roland Garros is a clay-surface court, a surface played on during the early months of the ATP and WTA tours. Players traditionally transition to grass following the French Open and then to hard courts after the Wimbledon Championships. The timing of the Paris Games, as cited by many of the withdrawing players, would force players to switch to grass for Wimbledon following the French Open, only to switch back to clay for the Olympics, and then switch to hard courts ahead of the US Open.

=== Russian invitations declined by federations ===
The IOC set strict guidelines on which Russian and Belarusian athletes would be invited to compete as Individual Neutral Athletes. Of the 36 invitations offered to Russian athletes, 10 were for weightlifters and 4 were for judokas. Initially, 9 of the weightlifters and 1 of the judokas had accepted their invitations, but the Russian weightlifting and judo federations stepped in to decline all invitations, saying that the IOC was discriminatory in only choosing some Russians. This appeared to go against the Russian Olympic Committee's statement that they would not boycott the Games despite limitations, as well as taking individual athletes out of participation.

=== Dismissal of the Indian archery coach ===
On 20 July, the head coach of India's archery team, Baek Woong-Ki, alleged that he had been dismissed from the team without warning after arriving in Marseille ahead of the team's training camp. Baek claimed that he had not been accredited for the Olympic Village despite having a contract that ran through 30 August. "I am a Korean coach who signed a contract to prepare for the Paris Olympics. But at a critical time, I was removed from the Olympic coaching role and my flight schedule told me to return home," Baek said in a statement. Baek had previously coached South Korea to two gold medals at the 2012 Summer Olympics.

=== Charlotte Dujardin withdrawal ===
On 23 July, British equestrian Charlotte Dujardin abruptly withdrew from the Games, citing her shame at a video of her "making an error of judgement" in a training session four years earlier. She also said that the video was being investigated by the International Federation for Equestrian Sports (FEI), and she felt it would be wrong to compete during the investigation. Later on the same day, the FEI provisionally suspended Dujardin for six months, per Dujardin's own request. The FEI said they had been sent the video and that it showed Dujardin "engaging in conduct contrary to the principles of horse welfare". A lawyer for the person who sent the video to the FEI said that, in the video, Dujardin could be seen "beating a horse excessively with a whip". The BBC noted that Dujardin would have likely become Great Britain's most-decorated female Olympian at the Games and was withdrawing from competition beyond the purview of a provisional suspension. The FEI felt the timing was unfortunate and thanked Dujardin for her willingness to cooperate. Dujardin had her national lottery funding removed after the video was made public.

=== Qualifications and group draws for badminton ===
On 19 April, the Badminton World Federation (BWF) announced that it had found errors in the calculation of ranking points in the "Race to Paris" ranking list and had made point modifications, causing the French men's doubles pairs Lucas Corvee/Ronan Labar and Christo Popov/Toma Junior Popov to switch ranking positions, with the latter becoming the only French pair to qualify for the event. This prompted Corvee and Labar to take the case to the Court of Arbitration for Sport (CAS), which ordered BWF to recommend Corvee/Labar to the IOC to be included as the 17th pair in the men's doubles event. The men's doubles group draw was postponed after the CAS hearing. Badminton Association of Indonesia (PBSI) criticised BWF's error as there will be a group consisting of five pairs, who would have to play four group phase matches instead of three and be at a disadvantage.

PBSI also criticized the competition format for the men's singles event. Players are drawn into 11 groups of three and 2 groups of four (groups P and L) in the group stage. Only the winners of each group can progress to the knockout stage. The winner of Group P receives a 'bye' in the round of 16, while that of Group L does not, having to play more matches on the way to the final, affecting the players' physical condition.

On 17 July, Danish mixed doubles player Mathias Christiansen withdrew from the Olympics due to making errors in reporting his 'whereabouts' with Anti-Doping Denmark. Christiansen and his partner Alexandra Bøje were removed from the event with no replacement or redraw.

=== Egyptian cyclist barred from Olympics ===
On 15 July, Egyptian cyclist Shahd Saeed was barred from the Olympics following a collision with her competitor Ganna Eliwa 300 metres (980 ft) before the finish line during the Republic Championship race in Suez on 27 April, which left the latter severely injured. The Egyptian Olympic Committee upheld a one-year suspension imposed by the Egyptian Cycling Federation. Despite initially being selected for the Olympics on 11 July, public backlash led to Saeed's exclusion. Saeed maintained the crash was accidental, though Eliwa claimed she never received an apology.

=== Absence of Urška Žigart and Tadej Pogačar withdrawal ===
Slovenian cyclist Tadej Pogačar withdrew from the Games in the days before they began at the end of July, initially citing fatigue: he had won the 2024 Tour de France on 21 July 2024, as well as the 2024 Giro d'Italia on 26 May 2024, premiere road cycling events that he had prioritised over the Olympics. Two days before the opening ceremony, Pogačar admitted that his withdrawal was also motivated by the Slovenian Olympic Committee (OKS) not selecting his girlfriend, fellow cyclist Urška Žigart, for the Olympics, though he said this was "not the main reason". He criticised the OKS for not selecting Žigart, based on her achievements – she is the Slovenian champion in both road race and time trial, as well as the nation's most successful female cyclist internationally – and because she had been the cyclist to secure their quota spots at the Olympics.

== During the Games ==
=== Canada women's football drone spying ===
On 22 July, the New Zealand women's football team noticed a drone flying over their training session in Saint-Étienne and reported this to local police, who found and detained the drone operator, Joseph Lombardi, an analyst with the Canada women's football team. The New Zealand Olympic Committee (NZOC) then reported the incident to the IOC integrity unit, before announcing the situation the next day. NZOC and New Zealand Football issued a joint statement expressing their disappointment towards the Canadian team. The Canadian Olympic Committee (COC) then apologized to the NZOC and said they would review next steps with all the relevant governing bodies. The COC announced on 24 July that a non-accredited member of their delegation, the drone operator, had been arrested, and admitted to filming New Zealand on 19 July, too. Lombardi and assistant coach Jasmine Mander were immediately sent home, and head coach Bev Priestman said she would not coach Canada's game against New Zealand on 25 July, the opening match of the women's football tournament, with assistant coach Andy Spence to be with the team. Priestman had led Canada to gold at the 2020 Games. Priestman denied being part of the spying scheme, and the COC initially said she would remain as head coach; after further information came to light, Priestman was removed from the Olympic squad on 26 July, with Spence to take over.

The COC reported that New Zealand had asked FIFA not to award points to Canada for their match. New Zealand Football said that they had sought "urgent action" from the FIFA Disciplinary Committee. On 27 July, FIFA announced that it had deducted six points from Canada in the tournament, fined Canada Soccer 200,000 Swiss francs, and banned Priestman, Lombardi, and Mander from all soccer for one year. On 29 July, the COC appealed the decision. On 31 July, the Court of Arbitration for Sport dismissed the appeal.

Media from the two nations noted that Priestman's wife, Emma Humphries, played for the New Zealand team, and that Mander's brother is part of the New Zealand Football delegation at the 2024 Olympics. At around midnight in Paris between 25 and 26 July, Canadian journalist Rick Westhead of The Sports Network published an investigative report indicating that drone spying had been endemic within Canada Soccer for several years.

=== Argentina vs Morocco men's football incidents ===
The opening match of the men's football tournament, between Argentina and Morocco, had 15 minutes of stoppage time added on at the end, a controversial method of time-wasting prevention seen in FIFA competitions. As the game entered the 16th minute of stoppage time, Morocco was leading 2–1 when Argentina took a shot at goal from the edge of the box. This shot was pushed back into the area by Morocco's goalkeeper, leading to another two Argentina attempts hitting the crossbar and falling back into the area in succession, before Cristian Medina was able to head the rebounding ball into the goal and equalize for Argentina. Moroccan fans, feeling that time had elapsed and the game should have ended before Argentina scored, immediately began rioting in the stadium. Spectators stormed the pitch and set off pyrotechnic explosions, leading to the game being suspended amid safety concerns for the players. The very angry response was also partially blamed on fans already disliking Argentina (who had been booed throughout the game) due to their senior team chanting a "racist and discriminatory" song (particularly targeting the French senior team in wake of defeating France in the 2022 World Cup final) after winning the 2024 Copa América earlier in July.

The game was presumed to have been called as full time, with fans being asked to leave the stadium and players and officials leaving the pitch, before the Olympics website updated to show the match as "interrupted". The VAR was also checking Medina's goal, and after an hour and a half of play being suspended, the score was updated to disallow Medina's goal for offside, with no other information. ESPN said that semi-automated offside technology would have disallowed the goal almost instantly, but, with the crowd already disrupting the match at that point, match officials probably took the decision to withhold this information to prevent potentially making the crowd issues worse. The VAR decision was that Bruno Amione, who took Argentina's third attempt at goal in the sequence, had been offside when Nicolás Otamendi took the second shot at goal, and that while the Moroccan goalkeeper touched the ball after Otamendi's shot, this did not reset the phase of play and so Amione was offside in the play that led to the goal. It was then announced that the game would resume for the remaining stoppage time, behind closed doors.

After nearly two hours, play resumed behind closed doors, and the goal was officially disallowed, with the referee also going through the motions of checking the pitchside monitor (despite semi-automated offside not using this) before awarding a free kick to Morocco to restart play. Morocco saw out three minutes to win. The Argentina team then criticized both the delayed VAR decision and holding back the players for over an hour to play a small amount of extra stoppage time; Argentina coach Javier Mascherano said there was a lack of any communication and that both teams had indicated they did not want to resume play.

=== Argentina vs France men's football brawl ===
After the final whistle of the men's football tournament quarterfinal between Argentina and France, a brawl broke out between the players. The match was a replay of the 2022 World Cup final, in which Argentina was victorious. Additionally, one month before the tournament, Argentinian midfielder Enzo Fernández posted a video on social media in which he and other Argentina players chanted derogatory remarks regarding members of the French team with African heritage in a postgame celebration after their Copa América win. While no actions were taken against Fernández, these events likely created hostile feelings for the host nation, and Argentina was met with boos throughout the match.

France won the game 1–0 via a header off a corner kick by Jean-Phillipe Mateta in the fifth minute, and immediately celebrated in front of Argentinian supporters. Nearly immediately following the final whistle, the two sides came together and began exchanging shoves, but the encounter did not escalate further. No further action was taken against either side, and France would go on and claim the silver medal in the tournament following a 5–3 extra time loss to Spain in the final.

=== Pro-Palestinian protests ===
Pro-Palestinian organizations encouraged protest actions at the open-air events being held at the Olympics.

There were protests at the football stadium for Israel's opening match against Mali, though they were described as small. A large security perimeter was established around the stadium, with a security convoy escorting the Israeli team to the stadium. The Israeli national anthem was booed at their match, and ten minutes into the game a scuffle broke out when Israeli fans began acting abusively towards people carrying inflatable watermelons. Security inside the stadium intervened and separated a group of pro-Palestine protestors and Israel fans; reportedly, some people wearing t-shirts saying "Free Palestine" were removed from the stadium. The pro-Palestinian group continued a peaceful protest in the stadium with Palestinian flags and a sign, though they were "man-marked" by security officers. The Israeli fans were asked to calm down.

In the judo competition, Abderrahmane Boushita of Morocco and Nurali Emomali of Tajikistan both refused to shake hands with Israeli athlete Baruch Shmailov, with Emomali yelling Allah Akbar before leaving the mat, and Algerian judoka Messaoud Dris was accused of avoiding competition against Israeli judoka Tohar Butbul. Dris weighed in with an incorrect weight for his category and was disqualified before competing; Israeli media said that this was deliberate. French news outlet Ouest-France reported that Dris was expected to forfeit the match, leading to an investigation being opened by the judo governing body.

=== Alleged antisemitism ===
Police opened an investigation into possible antisemitic crimes committed during the Group D football match between Israel and Paraguay.

=== French high-speed trains vandalism and arson attack ===
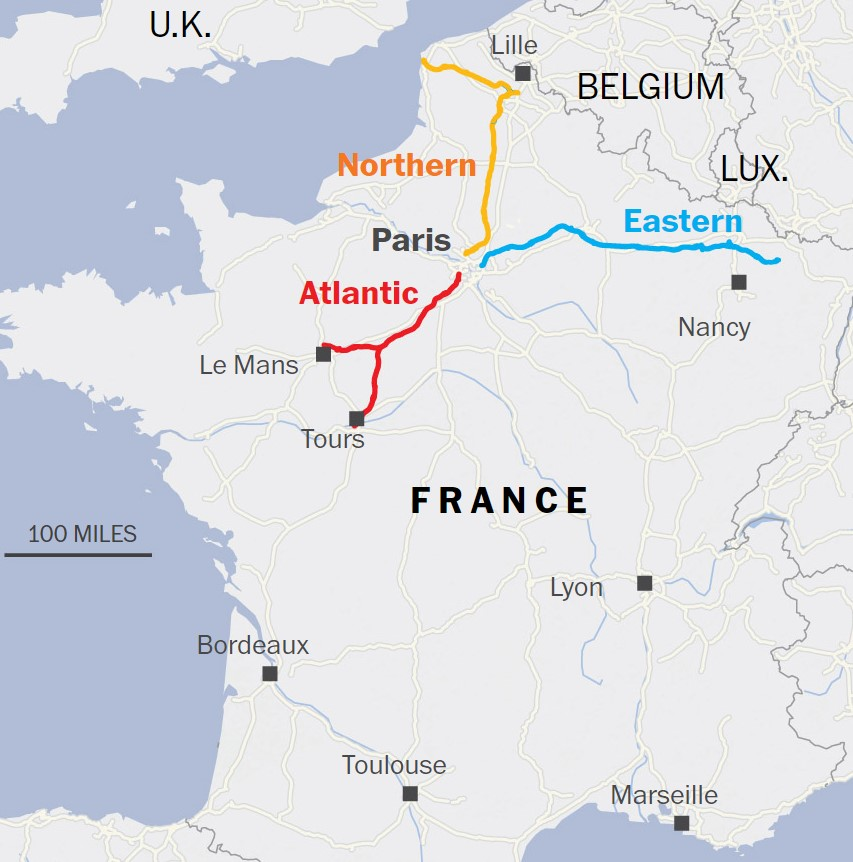
High-speed train lines targeted by attacks

Jean-Pierre Farandou, the head of the state-owned railway operator SNCF, reported that its high-speed rail network suffered from multiple instances of coordinated sabotage, causing significant disruptions to train services. The incident occurred just hours before the opening ceremony of the Olympics, considered a high-risk event. The affected lines were located in the western, northern, and eastern regions of France, impacting not only domestic trains but also the Eurostar services traveling to neighboring Belgium and to London via the Channel Tunnel. It was expected that roughly 800,000 travelers would be impacted because of this arson attack on French railway networks.

=== Bomb-threat alerts ===
- On 24 July, a suspicious bag was spotted near the football venue ahead of the match between Uzbekistan and Spain. Handling the issue caused some spectators to be held back and miss the start of the match.
- On 26 July, the Basel Mulhouse airport, also known as Euro Airport, on the France-Switzerland border received a bomb alert and the airport was evacuated and closed due to concerns about the safety of passengers and employees. Later, the airport was opened and flights were resumed after security checks by the French authorities.
- Also on 26 July, a bomb threat was also received by Paris police at Gare du Nord train station in Paris after two suspicious packages were reported just 6 hours before the opening ceremony of the Olympics, the unidentified packages were found on the tracks by the police. The authorities immediately evacuated and closed the train station due to concerns about the safety of passengers and employees.

=== Opening ceremony ===
Various elements of the opening ceremony generated controversy. After singer Aya Nakamura was announced as performing, she claimed to have received racial abuse, with far-right French figures being outraged at her presence; according to an Odoxa poll prior to the event, 63% of French people disapproved of Nakamura performing at the Olympics. A scene of drag queens at a bacchanal (or anthesteria) was interpreted by many commentators as a parody of depictions of the Last Supper, and deemed offensive by some Christian (including the Bishops' Conference of France) and Muslim groups, as well as conservatives. An initial statement from Paris 2024 said the scene was inspired by Leonardo da Vinci's The Last Supper fresco (housed in Santa Maria delle Grazie in Milan, one of the host cities of the 2026 Winter Olympics), though director Thomas Jolly denied this the following day and organizers apologized, saying Philippe Katerine was portraying Dionysus rather than Jesus. The published ceremony media guide (written before the ceremony) mentioned it being a homage to cultural festivities. According to Georgian fact checking website, Myth Detector, many experts pointed out differences between the Last Supper and the segment.

On the functional side, South Korea was introduced as the "Democratic People's Republic of Korea" (République populaire démocratique de Corée) – the formal name of North Korea – rather than the "Republic of Korea" (République de Corée). Jang Mi-ran, South Korea's Second Vice Minister of Culture, Sports and Tourism, asked the IOC for an official apology and to arrange a meeting with President Bach regarding this incident.

When the Olympic Flag was raised (during the Olympic Hymn), it was raised upside down.

=== Quality of food at Olympic Village ===
Athletes from Great Britain complained that raw meat was being served at the Olympic Village. Additionally, there were complaints regarding shortages of certain foods such as eggs, chicken, and types of carbohydrates. As a result, many British athletes began to avoid the Olympic village dining facilities and eat elsewhere, while the British Olympic Association flew in chefs for their delegation.

=== Criticism of cycling venues ===
The venues for the road cycling and mountain biking events were critiqued by many participants. Remco Evenepoel criticized the road conditions at the start and end of the time trial venue, stating "the road surface is pretty bad in the beginning and in the end. So that might be a problem if you have black spots in front of your eyes in the last kilometers. It's not so nice." Meanwhile, Nino Schurter said the mountain bike circuit at the Colline d'Élancourt was "slippery" and "quite loose" and lamented that it "could be a bit more natural" as "you can feel there was no mountain biking here before."

=== Pan Zhanle accused Kyle Chalmers and Jack Alexy of unsportsmanlike conduct ===
Following his victory in the men's 100 metre freestyle, China's Pan Zhanle accused Australian swimmer Kyle Chalmers of ignoring him when Pan approached him for a greeting. This was later clarified to be a misunderstanding.

Pan also mentioned that an incident similar occurred with Jack Alexy of the US team. Pan recounted that during a training session, his coach was on the pool deck when Alexy performed a flip turn and splashed water on him.

=== Tennis match between Emma Navarro and Zheng Qinwen ===
After tennis player Emma Navarro lost to opponent Zheng Qinwen in the Round of 16, Navarro spoke heatedly to Zheng at net during the handshake as the latter responded "with a few curt nods" and several shrugs. Navarro later stated to Agence France-Presse that she told Zheng she "didn't respect her as a competitor", adding she thought Zheng "goes about things in a pretty cut-throat way." When asked about the exchange at the net, Zheng said: "I'm glad that she told me that," Zheng continued. "I will not consider it an attack because she lost the match." Navarro's comments were controversial and drew criticism from Spanish newspaper MARCA.

=== Women's boxing controversy ===
Two boxers who had been disqualified from the 2023 Women's World Boxing Championships organised by the International Boxing Association (IBA) for failing sex verification tests – Imane Khelif of Algeria and Lin Yu-ting of Chinese Taipei – were selected for the Olympics. Both had competed at the Olympic boxing tournament in 2020.

The IBA had faced allegations of corruption, which prompted the IOC to suspend its recognition of the organization in 2019, and have Olympic boxing instead governed by an internal task force during the 2020 and 2024 Games. After Umar Kremlev was elected as the IBA's president in 2020, the organisation also began to face allegations that it was increasingly serving Russian interests, with additional concerns raised over irregularities in a 2022 election that kept Kremlev in power unopposed; in June 2023, the IOC executive board voted to strip the IBA of its recognition, citing that it had not made sufficient progress on reforming its governance and finance since the 2019 suspension.

Kremlev had claimed that unspecified DNA testing of Khelif and other athletes "proved they had XY chromosomes and were thus excluded from the sports events". He said the tests were carried out by medical professionals "at the request of female athletes" and after "the women's coaches complained a lot". Khelif made an appeal before the Court of Arbitration for Sport but later withdrew it. The IOC later denounced the IBA's process as a decision "solely by the IBA Secretary General and CEO. The IBA Board only ratified it afterwards" according to The Washington Post.

Both Khelif and Lin met requirements for the Olympics, with IOC spokesperson Mark Adams defending their requirements and refusing to speak about individual cases, instead saying "everyone competing in the women's category is complying with the competition eligibility rules. They are women in their passports and it is stated that is the case". The IOC said the key criterion is the gender listed on the athlete's passport. The IOC's decision was the subject of controversy and criticism, including from former boxing world champion Barry McGuigan and Australian boxing team captain Caitlin Parker.

Controversy arose after Khelif defeated Italian boxer Angela Carini. Carini abandoned her fight against Khelif after 46 seconds, stating she was hit harder than she had ever been hit and feared her nose was broken. Khelif received a wave of online backlash from those who accused her of being male. Italian Prime Minister Giorgia Meloni questioned the IOC's decision, saying: "I think that athletes who have male genetic characteristics should not participate in women's competitions. Not because we want to discriminate against anyone, but to protect the rights of female athletes to compete on equal terms." Italian Sports Minister Andrea Abodi said: "I find it difficult to understand that there is no alignment in the parameters of minimum hormonal values at an international level, which includes the European and world championships and the Olympics." Meloni met with IOC President Thomas Bach the following morning to voice her concerns.

The Algerian Olympic Committee (COA) defended Khelif, denouncing what they called "unethical targeting" and "baseless propaganda". They criticised certain media outlets for maligning Khelif and highlighted the unfairness of these attacks on her character. The COA emphasised that they have taken all necessary measures to protect Khelif and reaffirmed her right to compete. Boris van der Vorst – head of the competing governing body World Boxing – also denounced the criticism of Khelif, stating that "the pressure that there is from social media, from the press, from everyone else. It's not very helpful, and it's getting into everyone's head."

IOC president Thomas Bach defended the participation of Imane Khelif and Lin Yu-ting, saying: "We have two boxers who were born as women, who have been raised as women, who have a passport as a woman, and who have competed for many years as women." He added: "There was never any doubt about them being a woman. This is not a DSD case, this is about a woman taking part in a women's competition, and I think I have explained this many times." However the IOC immediately issued a correction, stating that Bach had meant to say this was not a transgender case. According to Taiwan News, Taiwanese President Lai Ching-te had called on the public to fully support Lin—praising her professionalism and resilience—while former President Tsai Ing-wen also expressed support for Lin on her Facebook page.

Both boxers won the gold medal in their respective weights. After the Games, Khelif filed a criminal complaint with the French police alleging cyberbullying. The complaint was filed against X (persons unknown in French law, allowing all leads to be investigated), but named Elon Musk and J. K. Rowling.

=== Taiwanese fan ejection and banner destruction ===
On 2 August, security at a badminton match involving the Taiwanese Olympic badminton team forcibly removed a man who displayed a banner that read "Taiwan go for it." Taiwan competes at the Olympics as Chinese Taipei, and any mention of the name Taiwan is forbidden. The Taiwanese government protested the spectator's removal. In a separate incident at the same event, a fan who destroyed a banner supporting the Taiwanese team was escorted out by security. In a third incident, security confiscated a towel that said "Taiwan" from a fan. The towel was later identified as a souvenir from the 2020 Summer Olympics in Tokyo. There was no ban placed on Chinese flags or slogans, which were prominently displayed in the venue. Taiwan News reported that signs were again confiscated at the final, including one which featured bubble tea but made no direct reference to Taiwan.

=== Chinese broadcast of the finals of men's doubles badminton ===
Radio Free Asia reported that due to political tensions between China and Taiwan, China's national television broadcaster China Central Television (CCTV) cut the live sections of the broadcast of the final of badminton men's doubles when Taiwanese players Lee Yang and Wang Chi-lin were winning over Chinese players Liang Weikeng and Wang Chang. The live medal ceremony and audience celebrations at the end were also cut by CCTV following the Taiwanese pair's victory in the final.

=== Timing error during women's team pursuit ===
During the qualifying round of the women's team pursuit on 6 August, the Canadian team rode an additional two laps due to the final lap bell failing to ring. Despite this, the Canadians still progressed to the next round of the competition.

=== Disqualification of Vinesh Phogat ===
On 7 August, Indian wrestler Vinesh Phogat was disqualified before her gold medal bout in the women's 50kg freestyle event against Sarah Ann Hildebrandt of the United States, after being found 100 grams overweight in the second weigh-in. Phogat had on the previous day beaten reigning Olympic champion Yui Susaki - handing the Japanese her first ever international defeat - in the Round of 16, Oksana Livach of Ukraine in the Quarterfinals, and Yusneylys Guzman Lopez of Cuba in the Semifinals, having weighed-in at 49.9 kg in the morning of 6 August. By the evening, however, her weight had increased to 52.7 kg. Phogat and her team tried drastic measures throughout the night to make weight, including foregoing sleep, spending hours on the treadmill and the sauna, not consuming any food or fluids, and even shortening her clothes and her hair. On 8 August, in a post on X, Phogat announced her retirement from wrestling. The disqualification meant that Guzman Lopez proceeded to the final, while Susaki and Livach contested the bronze medal match.

The Indian Olympic Association (IOA) filed an appeal against the disqualification at the Court of Arbitration for Sport (CAS), also contending that she be given a joint silver medal as she had complied with weight regulations during the bouts of 6 August. On 13 August, the Ad-hoc division of the CAS dismissed the appeal, with its detailed order of 19 August putting the onus on the athlete to meet weight requirements. The ruling, however, called the weight regulations "draconian" and found "no wrongdoing" on Phogat's part. Phogat also received support from Japanese wrestler Rei Higuchi, who had been disqualified at the 2020 Tokyo Olympics for being overweight but won gold at Paris 2024, and American wrestler Jordan Burroughs.

The case evoked strong responses in India, including suggestions of sabotage, with opposition politicians like Randeep Singh Surjewala, Supriya Sule and Bhagwant Singh Mann questioning the Sports Ministry, the IOA and Phogat's support team. The opposition Congress linked the incident to Phogat's participation in the 2023 wrestlers' protests against the incumbent Bharatiya Janata Party's erstwhile MP and Wrestling Federation of India (WFI) chief Brij Bhushan Sharan Singh. Phogat's natural weight category was the 53 kg, but she had to reduce her weight to compete in the 50 kg because another wrestler, Antim Panghal, had earned the sole available quota during the period of the protests. On 8 August, Phogat's lawyer alleged in the Delhi High Court that the WFI and its president Sanjay Singh were at the Olympics village making proxy decisions on her fate, despite its executive committee being suspended in December 2023 by the Sports Ministry. On social media, the saga was also compared to the disqualification and eventual reinstatement of Kenyan runner Faith Kipyegon for obstructing Ethiopian opponent Gudaf Tsegay in the women's 5000 metres.

=== Disqualification from breaking ===
On 9 August, b-girl Manizha Talash, representing the Refugee Olympic Team, was disqualified from breaking because she wore a cape with the words "Free Afghan Women" on it in the pre-qualifier round. This was ruled a violation of rule 50 of the Olympic Charter, which prohibits political messages or protests on the field of play at the Olympics.

=== Iranian censorship ===
During and after the Kimia Alizadeh vs Nahid Kiani match, Iran's state-run broadcaster, IRIB, censored Alizadeh and the podium celebrations when Alizadeh and Kiani were embracing each other, after having censored the opening ceremony weeks prior as well. During the broadcast, IRIB reporters refused to mention Alizadeh by name and attacked her with nicknames such as "homeless". Alizadeh had defected to Germany from Iran years prior.

=== Player actions during the women's field hockey semi-finals ===
At the women's field hockey semi-final on 8 August between China and Belgium and following the blowing of the whistle signifying end of the full-time part of the match, Chinese player Fan Yunxia, in frustration, hit the ball towards Belgian player Delphine Marien, resulting in the ball striking her hard in the leg and Marien falling to the ground. Several of the Belgian team members confronted Fan, resulting in a scuffle. The referee awarded both Fan and the Belgium player Judith Vandermeiren the yellow card while the on-site commentary of the match stated that Fan's actions were dangerous, reckless and unnecessary. Vandermeiren protested her penalty, saying she was just protecting her teammates, while Eurosport reported that the Chinese side appeared to accept Fan's punishment.

=== Filipino women's golf gear delay ===
Filipino golfers Bianca Pagdanganan and Dottie Ardina were forced to contest the women's golf event in non-official attire and with non-official gear after their original Adidas gear and attire was not approved by the IOC and their replacements were delayed by French customs. Both golfers were seen having to cover logos on their clubs that did not comply with the Olympics' policy on unsanctioned display of branding.

=== Reaction to Australian breaker ===
The performance of Australian b-girl Rachael "Raygun" Gunn during her three round-robin battles in breakdancing garnered widespread mockery online. Gunn finished last in her group, going 0-54 across three matches. In response to the reaction, Team Australia Chef de Mission Anna Meares issued a statement in support of Gunn, condemning what Meares called "trolls and keyboard warriors."

On 15 August, the Australian Olympic Committee (AOC) spoke out against a Change.org petition targeted at Gunn. The petition, which received over 40,000 signatures, alleged that the AOC had "manipulated" the Oceanic Olympic qualifying to benefit Gunn. The AOC called the petition "defamatory" and called for its removal from the website as it contained "numerous falsehoods."

Raygun later defended her performance in an interview with Channel 10, citing her status as Australia's top-ranked b-girl in 2020, 2022, and 2023, as well as calling the reaction to her performance "alarming".

=== Thai flag for Tajik medalist ===
During the victory ceremony of the boxing heavyweight event on 9 August, the Thai flag was raised instead of the Tajik flag. The Paris Olympic committee released a statement apologizing for the mistake.

== Judging controversies ==
=== Women's fencing épée round of 32 ===
In the women's épée round of 32, Chinese fencer and reigning Olympic champion Sun Yiwen was eliminated after the referee judged that her opponent, Miho Yoshimura, had touched her. Sun said that "she didn't touch me in her last attempt but when I asked the referee to watch the replay, he had already done it and wouldn't watch it again", expressing her frustration and disappointment that the results could not be changed after replay.

=== Men's judo under-60 kg quarterfinal ===
Japanese judoka Ryuju Nagayama failed to advance to the gold medal match after a controversial ruling. Opponent Francisco Garrigós from Spain won the competition via ippon after a chokehold, but did not release a hold after the referee called matte (wait) and thus violated the rules of the call. Nagayama did not agree with the call, giving a disbelieving shrug after the decision and refusing to shake hands, which the audience booed. Essentially Sports wrote that the judo community was critical towards Nagayama for the bad sportsmanship.

=== GB boxing ===
BBC Sport commentators were shocked at the controversial loss of British women's boxer Rosie Eccles, who had led throughout her entire last 32 bout and whose opponent (Poland's Aneta Rygielska) had a point deducted and received a warning for failing to keep her head up. Steve Bunce expressed that he was stunned at the bout being a split decision and that the two judges who deemed it equal then signalled for the boxer with the infringement, Rygielska, to win. Bunce said, "I'm really annoyed. It's a bad decision." The previous day, British women's boxer Charley Davison had also lost her fight in a close split decision, with TNT commentator Ian Darke tweeting afterwards that she was "scandalously robbed" and "won very very clearly." GB men's boxer Pat Brown also lost his first match; Barney Ronay for The Guardian wrote that, considering the three boxers, "at least two of those judging decisions [are] open to question."

On 29 July, British men's boxer Delicious Orie also surprisingly lost his first bout to Armenian boxer Davit Chaloyan: he was seeded as the number 2 in the Olympics, and was fighting an opponent whom he had easily beaten at the 2023 European Games. Saying he would not comment on the fairness of the judging, Orie added that he did not think his opponent had done enough to win. Bunce added that British boxers "have got targets on their backs", calling the tournament "a bit of a reality check".

=== Men's fencing foil final ===
In the finals of the men's foil, Hong Kong's Cheung Ka Long defeated Italy's Filippo Macchi by 15:14, defending his title as Olympics champion. The Italian fencing federation reacted to the ruling as "unacceptable refereeing" and made an official protest to the Fédération Internationale d'Escrime and the IOC, where the president Giovanni Malagò remarked that "in no sport is there a referee 'bordering on an athlete'". The main referee Huang Hao Chih is from Chinese Taipei (Taiwan), whereas video referee Suh Sang Won is from South Korea. However, Filippo Macchi made a post on his Instagram page to say that he respected the decisions of the judges and did not want to assign blame to them for his loss. He further added that he knew both of the referees.

The perceived unjust ruling sparked a conflict between Hong Kong and Italian netizens. Italian fans criticised Cheung through the comments on his Instagram account; in response, Hong Kong fans taunted the Italians by expressing their fondness of pineapple pizza and soy sauce spaghetti, considered to be a faux pas in Italian cuisine. As a playful response to the online exchange, Pizza Hut's subsidiaries in Hong Kong and Macao announced free pineapple toppings on their pizzas for 30 July until 31 July.

=== Surfing judge removal ===
After Australian surfing judge Benjamin Lowe posted a picture on social media of himself posing with Australian competitor Ethan Ewing and his coach Bede Durbidge, Lowe was removed from the judging panel by the International Surfing Association on August 1.

=== Skeet shooting miss controversy ===
The final of the women's skeet shooting ended with the shooters tied and went to a shoot-off. In one of the shoot-off shots, Amber Rutter hit the target, but it was called a miss. Rutter challenged the call, but in the review, the judges did not look at slow-motion replay (which was used in action replays and showed she hit the target), and they again called it a miss, causing Rutter to lose the shoot-off for the silver medal.

=== Women's gymnastics floor score appeal ===
During the women's gymnastics floor final, Romanian gymnasts Ana Maria Bărbosu and Sabrina Maneca-Voinea initially placed third and fourth, respectively, right ahead of American gymnast Jordan Chiles, with Bărbosu thinking she had won the bronze medal. Chiles' coach, Cécile Canqueteau-Landi, then filed an inquiry on Chiles' score, which resulted in a review; the appeal was accepted, which increased her difficulty score by one-tenth. It was then adjusted to 5.9 from 5.8, and the overall score was upgraded to 13.766, moving her from fifth to a bronze medal position. While score inquiries are not uncommon within gymnastics, further controversy arose when it was revealed that Voinea had received a 0.1 point deduction for going out of bounds. The replay showed that Voinea may not have gone out of bounds. If the deduction had not been taken, Voinea would have scored 13.800, which would have put her in the bronze medal position even after Chiles's score was increased.

Former Romanian Olympic gymnast, Nadia Comăneci, and Mihai Covaliu, president of the Romanian Olympic and Sports Committee, requested that Morinari Watanabe, the president of the International Gymnastics Federation, allow for Voinea's floor exercise to be re-analyzed.

The Prime Minister of Romania, Marcel Ciolacu, stated that he would boycott the closing ceremony due to "the scandalous situation in the gymnastics, where [Romanian] athletes were treated in an absolutely dishonorable manner".

On 10 August, five days after the event, the IOC announced that it was stripping Chiles of her bronze medal and awarding it to Bărbosu. The Court of Arbitration for Sport (CAS) ruled that Chiles's score inquiry was filed four seconds after the one-minute time limit to file an appeal had lapsed. Therefore, the appeal was void, and Chiles's original fifth-place score was restored. Voinea's separate appeal to the CAS was denied. A request to award multiple bronze medals was also denied.

On 11 August, USA Gymnastics announced that it had newly available time-stamped video evidence showing that Head Coach Cécile Canqueteau-Landi first stated her request to file an inquiry at 47 seconds, within the 1-minute deadline. USA Gymnastics formally submitted a letter to the CAS, requesting reinstatement of the 13.766 score.

On 12 August, the Court of Arbitration for Sport denied a request to reconsider its ruling, and in response, USA Gymnastics said it would "continue to pursue every possible avenue and appeal process, including to the Swiss Federal Tribunal." On 16 September 2024, it was confirmed Chiles had filed an appeal in the Federal Supreme Court of Switzerland.

== Athlete misconduct ==
On July 19, the Japan Gymnastics Association (JCA) announced that women's gymnastics team captain Shoko Miyata had withdrawn from the Games and returned home after allegations that Miyata had been smoking emerged. The JCA said Miyata, who at 19 years was under the legal Japanese smoking and drinking age, had admitted to both smoking and drinking in Paris.

On 5 August, it was reported that Paraguayan swimmer Luana Alonso had been asked to leave the Olympic Village after creating what the team's chef de mission described as an "inappropriate atmosphere". Alonso responded on 6 August, stating that she had been reprimanded but had left the Olympic Village of her own free will.

On 7 August, Australian field hockey player Tom Craig was arrested by the police after he was seen purchasing cocaine from an underage dealer on the streets. Craig was released without charge, where he would lose all his remaining Olympic privileges and miss the closing ceremony.

On 8 August, Indian wrestler Antim Panghal was evicted from the Olympics village after her sister attempted to enter the village with her credentials. In response, the Indian Olympic Association (IOC) withdrew Antim Panghal before returning her and her support staff to India.

On 9 August, Egyptian wrestler Mohamed Ibrahim El-Sayed was arrested by French police for allegedly groping a woman at a café in Paris.

== Others ==
=== Saudi Arabian pavilion in Les Invalides ===
Many NOCs build "Olympic villages", like exhibition pavilions, in the host city as places for national promotion and for their country's fans to gather. The Saudi Arabian Olympic Committee wanted to build an Olympic village at the site of Les Invalides, a historic military complex and the location of Napoleon's tomb, drawing criticism in France. The Ministry of Armed Forces held discussions with Saudi Arabia, causing consternation in the government, with a French politician saying that the site is "not for sale". Saudi Arabia reportedly wanted to secure the location to give itself prominence at the Games, as part of its wider policy of improving its international image through sports. While the Ministry of Armed Forces did negotiate use of the site with Saudi Arabia, they wanted to set very strict conditions, which the Saudis did not agree to; France denied them use of Les Invalides.

=== Bruce Mwape alleged sexual misconduct investigation ===
In 2022, an investigation into alleged sexual misconduct by Bruce Mwape, the coach of the Zambia women's national football team, began; it was still ongoing at the time of the 2024 Games, having previously caused controversy at the 2023 FIFA Women's World Cup, with further reports of misconduct in 2023 towards players and female staff. At the time of the 2023 World Cup, the IOC said that it "will be following the outcome of this case closely, for consideration with respect to the Olympic Games". Mwape struggled to obtain a travel visa as people accused of sexual crimes are not allowed visas under French law, but was eventually granted one, under strict conditions that include not having any private contact with the players. The visa was granted after the Football Association of Zambia told French officials it was too late to replace their coach and agreed a safeguarding plan with the IOC and FIFA.

=== Adidas Olympic campaign controversy ===
In a promotion for the Olympics, Adidas released products based on previous Olympic Games, including "SL72" footwear inspired by the 1972 Summer Olympics in Munich. Their marketing campaign that featured the footwear also featured model Bella Hadid. Israel's official X/Twitter account criticised Hadid's appearance in the Adidas campaign because the 1972 Games was the site of the Munich massacre, in which 11 members of the Israeli Olympic team were killed by the Palestinian militant organisation Black September. Hadid's father is Palestinian. Adidas removed the commercial featuring Hadid, said that there was no reference to the massacre in the campaign, and apologised to Hadid after she retained a lawyer in relation to the controversy.

=== Malaysia official attire design ===
The Olympic Council of Malaysia (OCM) and Yonex released the official attire of the Malaysian delegation to the Olympics on 23 June. The designs featuring tracksuits, polo shirts and t-shirts with a tiger theme were described as being inspired from the nation's "relentless pursuit [of] gold medals".

The design received negative feedback for being "ugly", "uninspiring", and a "low effort" design, inferior to the one worn by the delegation at the 2022 Asian Games. The manner of unveiling using mannequins was also criticized.

On 2 July, Yonex and the OCM unveiled a new design featuring jackets with a more prominent tiger stripes motif in black and yellow.

=== Sexism in sports journalism ===
Some journalists were criticised for their commentary about female athletes during the Olympics. One incident involved Eurosport's Bob Ballard saying: "Well, the women just finishing up. You know what women are like … hanging around, doing their makeup" after Shayna Jack, Mollie O'Callaghan, Emma Mckeon and Meg Harris won the 4 × 100 m freestyle relay. Ballard was removed from his position after the comment and posting on social media that he had not meant to offend. Another incident involved a commentator introducing a tennis player by saying "She does everything: The washing up, the cooking, the mopping up". Host broadcaster Olympic Broadcasting Services also reminded camera operators to not film women differently than they would film men.
