= Boycotts of Israel in sports =

Boycotts of Israel in sports refer to various disqualifications and denial of Israeli athletes due to the refusal of some countries to recognize the state of Israel and to outrage about Israeli actions such as the Gaza genocide. As part of a more or less systematic boycott of Israel, Israeli athletes and teams have been barred from some competitions. In many international competitions, where Israel does take part, such as the Olympic Games, some Arab and Muslim competitors avoid competing against Israelis. Some countries, most notably Iran, even compel their athletes not to compete against Israelis or in Israel.

== History ==
=== The Arab League boycott of Israel ===
The Israel Football Association was a member of the Asian Football Confederation (AFC) group of FIFA between 1954 and 1974. Because of the Arab League boycott of Israel, several Arab and Muslim states refused to compete against Israel. The political situation culminated in Israel winning the 1958 World Cup qualifying stage for Asia and Africa without playing a single game, forcing FIFA to schedule a playoff between Israel and Wales to ensure the Israeli team did not qualify without playing at least one game (which Wales won). In 1974, Israel was expelled from the AFC group by a resolution initiated by Kuwait, which was adopted by AFC by a vote of 17 to 13 with 6 abstentions. To get around the ban, Israel was admitted as an associated member of the Union of European Football Associations (UEFA) in 1992, and was admitted as a full member of the UEFA group in 1994. Supporters of the Boycott Divestment Sanctions (BDS) movement have advocated for Israel to be expelled or suspended from FIFA, without success. On 24 August 2018, the President of the Palestinian Football Association (PFA) Jibril Rajoub was fined CHF 20,000 (US$20,333) and banned from FIFA matches for a year for inciting hatred and violence against an Argentinian team proposing to play a friendly match in Israel.

The 1976 Chess Olympiad was held in the Israeli city of Haifa, which generated controversy, since several countries, such as the Soviet Union and the Arab nations, did not recognize the state of Israel. As FIDE refused to change the venue, the Soviet team boycotted the tournament in protest, as did all Soviet satellite states in Eastern Europe and FIDE member Arab nations, which held an alternative Chess Olympiad in the Libyan city of Tripoli.

In October 2017, when an Israeli Tal Flicker won gold in an international judo championship in the United Arab Emirates, officials refused to fly the Israeli flag and play the Israeli national anthem, instead playing the official music of the International Judo Federation (IJF) and flying the IJF's logo. The UAE also banned Israeli athletes from wearing their country's symbols on uniforms, having to wear IJF uniforms. Other contestants such as Gili Cohen received similar treatment. In December 2017, seven Israelis were denied visas by Saudi Arabia to compete in an international chess tournament. In October 2018, the UAE reversed its position allowing the Israeli flag be displayed and anthem played when an Israeli judoka Sagi Muki won a gold medal.

On 24 May 2018, a team of international jurists, including Harvard Professor Alan Dershowitz, announced a plan to petition the international Court of Arbitration for Sport against the exclusion of Israel's flag and anthem at sporting events in Arab countries. In July 2018, the International Judo Federation cancelled two grand slam judo events, in Tunis and Abu Dhabi, because Israeli flags were not allowed to be raised. Also in July 2018, the World Chess Federation said it will ban Tunisia from hosting the international chess competition in 2019 if it does not grant a visa to Israeli contestants, including a seven-year-old Israeli girl champion.

In March 2019, the Israeli national anthem was played in Qatar after Israeli gymnast Alexander Shatilov won the gold medal for the floor exercise during the 2019 FIG Artistic Gymnastics World Cup series. The anthem had previously been played in Abu Dhabi in October 2018, after Israeli judoka Sagi Muki won the gold medal in the Judo Grand Competition.

In 2024 New Year's Eve, Jordan's Football Association (JFA) asked in a statement from the global sports community for determining "decisive action to stop the aggression against Palestinians in Gaza and the occupied territories." Based on the statement, in order to restrict Israeli sport in International competition, "stringent sanctions" were demanded.

=== Boycott for Operation Cast Lead (2009) ===
In 2009, there was an increased number of boycotts and boycott campaigns against Israeli athletes over Operation Cast Lead. Israeli tennis star Shahar Peer was denied a visa to participate in a tournament in Dubai, leading to comments from stars like Venus Williams and Andy Roddick that were critical of the Dubai authorities' decision, with Roddick later pulling out of a tournament in Dubai. After a response that included a cable network cancelling its coverage of the event and a large fine for the Dubai Tennis Authorities, the United Arab Emirates did issue a visa for Israeli tennis player Andy Ram to compete that year. Campaigners in New Zealand asked Peer to heed the BDS call and not participate in local NZ tournaments, but Peer publicly dismissed them and the officials welcomed Peer's participation.

Tennis authorities in Malmö, Sweden wanted to cancel a Davis Cup match between Israel and Sweden because of anti-Israel riots and because the city council did not want the Israeli team competing in the city. The tennis authorities were unwilling to accept a Swedish forfeit, which would have eliminated Sweden from the competition, and decided to bar spectators from the match instead (Israel ended up knocking Sweden out of the 2009 tournament with a 3–2 series victory). As a punishment, the city was banned from hosting Davis Cup matches for five years and fined thousands of dollars.

=== 2012 London Olympics ===
Supporters of the BDS movement also tried and failed to have Israeli teams barred from the 2012 London Olympics and the 2016 Rio Olympics. At the 2016 Rio Olympics, Egypt's Islam El Shehaby provoked outrage after refusing to shake hands with Israeli judoka, Or Sasson.

=== 2019 World Paralympic Swimming Championships ===
On 18 January 2019, Israel called upon the International Paralympic Committee to move the World Paralympic Swimming Championships scheduled for Malaysia in July 2019 because it has refused to let Israelis participate. 10 days later, the IPC confirmed that due to Malaysia's actions regarding Israeli visas, the championships would be stripped from Malaysia and moved to another location. The IPC board said Malaysia “failed to provide the necessary guarantees that Israeli Para swimmers could participate, free from discrimination, and safely in the Championships”, including full compliance with the IPC protocols related to anthems and flags.

=== 2020 Tokyo Olympics ===
In July 2021, Algerian judo athlete Fethi Nourine withdrew from the 2020 Tokyo Olympics rather than face an Israeli competitor. The International Judo Federation (IJF) temporarily suspended Nourine and his coach.

=== 2023 FIFA U-20 World Cup ===
In March 2023, Indonesia was stripped of hosting rights for the 2023 FIFA U-20 World Cup after senior government officials stated they would not allow Israel's participation in Bali, where several matches had been scheduled to take place. The tournament was moved to Argentina, where the Israeli team joined the competition; Indonesia ended up not being in the tournament at all because their national team had not qualified on the field and lost their automatic host nation spot when FIFA pulled the event out of the country.

=== Ice Hockey Federation 2024 ===
According to the announcement of the International Ice Hockey Federation, after the suspension of Belarus and Russia from the tournament, in February 2024, Israel was also removed from the tournament due to security reasons. To much outcry, they were then reinstated.

=== 2024 Summer Olympics ===
Palestinian sports organizations and sports organizations from Arab countries have called for sanctions to be imposed against Israel and to prevent its participation in the 2024 Summer Olympics due to the Gaza war in the Gaza Strip. The calls from the organizations have been prompted by concerns about the war's impact on Palestinian athletes and sports facilities. These calls have come with comparisons to Russia and Belarus, who were banned following the former's invasion of Ukraine and whose participants were only allowed under the Individual Neutral Athletes label. In November 2023, Russia accused the IOC of having double standards by not sanctioning Israel due to its military actions in Gaza, as Palestine is also an IOC member. In January 2024, over 300 Palestinian sports clubs called for Israel to be barred from the 2024 Olympics after Israeli airstrikes had killed Palestine's Olympic football team coach, and damaged the headquarters of the Palestine Olympic Committee in Gaza.

American academic and former professional footballer Jules Boykoff described the double standards as "glaring" and questioned the IOC's treatment of Israel compared to Russia stating, "If taking over sports facilities are a red line, why silence as Israel converts Gaza's historic Yarmouk Stadium into an internment camp?". Boykoff has also stated that Israel's various settlements in the West Bank, East Jerusalem, and the Golan Heights "would be in clear violation [of the Olympic charter] in the same way as what Russia has done".

In February, 26 left-wing French lawmakers sent a letter to the IOC, urging sanctions against Israel, and calling for a ban on Israeli athletes competing under their flag and anthem, citing Israel's war crimes in the Gaza Strip. The lawmakers proposed that Israeli athletes participate neutrally, similar to Russian and Belarusian athletes, during the Games.

The IOC has cautioned athletes against boycotting or discriminating others, stating that immediate action will follow any discriminatory behavior such as the case of Algerian judoka Fethi Nourine, who received a ten-year ban following his refusal to fight Tohar Butbul, an Israeli in 2020. The IOC also stated that athletes are not to be held accountable for their government's actions. In March 2024, IOC President Thomas Bach made it clear there was no issue regarding Israel participating at the 2024 Summer Olympics and cautioned athletes against boycotts and discrimination.

Following the Israeli attacks on the Yarmouk stadium, the Palestinian Football Federation asked FIFA to condemn Israel. 200 Irish athletes also supported this action and demanded the exclusion of Israel from the Olympics. Also press conference held in Beirut under the title "Stop the genocide of the Palestinian people" aiming at preventing Israel from participating in the Paris Olympics.

=== The Democracy in Europe Movement 2025 ===
After October 7 attacks in 2023, a letter in the European Parliament, and the dispute between Israeli and Irish basketball players led to forming a petition to ban Israel from international sports. The petition by the Democracy in Europe Movement 2025 called for the suspension of Israel from the international games and had attracted around 70,000 signatures as of February 16.

=== EuroBasket 2025 qualification ===
At EuroBasket qualifier in February 2024, Ireland's national women's basketball players did not shake hands with their Israeli opponents due to "outrage over accusations of antisemitism".

=== Calls for Israel's suspension from FIFA ===
On 17 May 2024, FIFA announced that they would hold a special council meeting on 20 July to determine if the Israel Football Association would be suspended from international competitions. However, the decision was delayed to an unfixed date after 31 August – after 2024 Summer Olympics in which Israel participated. On 3 October 2024, FIFA again delayed the decision of suspension, citing that they will first investigate the allegations of discrimination raised by the Palestinian Football Association. These delays in regards to suspension of Israel came in contrast to FIFA's quick decision to suspend Russia in the light of Russian invasion of Ukraine. On March 19, 2026, FIFA refused to impose sanctions suspending Israel's participation in international football competitions, citing the unresolved legal status of the West Bank under international public law, and instead opted to impose a fine for violations related to discrimination.

During a UEFA Champions League match against Bayern Munich, fans of Celtic F.C. raised a banner calling on FIFA to "Show Israel the Red Card." The campaign was organized by the Celtic ultras group, the Green Brigade. Fans in several other countries subsequently created similar displays using the slogan to call for Israel's suspension.

Prior to Italy's 2026 World Cup qualification matches against Israel, the Italian Football Coaches’ Association (AIAC) called for Israel to be suspended from UEFA and FIFA over the Gaza war.

In September 2025, reports surfaced that Spain could possibly boycott the 2026 FIFA World Cup should Israel qualify and be allowed to compete. That same month, a joint letter from Irish club Bohemians, Irish Sport for Palestine, and FairSquare called on UEFA and FIFA to suspend Israel. Later that month, the Turkish Football Federation called for Israel to be suspended from UEFA and FIFA. In October 2025, Amnesty International called for FIFA and UEFA to suspend Israel over settlement clubs in the West Bank.

=== BBC's presenter ===
Gary Winston Lineker has been the presenter of the popular football show Match of the Day since 1990. In May 2025, it was announced that he would step down from the BBC show at the end of the 2024–25 Premier League season due to posts regarding Zionism.

=== 2025 World Artistic Gymnastics Championships ===
Entry visas must be granted to the gymnasts/athletes and to the officials of all Member Federations. In the event that this requirement is not fulfilled, the allocation of the event would be cancelled with immediate effect by the Executive Committee.

— Art. 26.4 Assurances Concerning Visas of the 2025 Statutes of the International Gymnastics Federation

Less than two weeks before the start of the 2025 World Artistic Gymnastics Championships, Indonesia's senior minister of law, Yusril Ihza Mahendra, announced that Indonesia would reject the visas for Israeli athletes due to their support of Palestine in the Gaza war, adding that this decision is in line with Indonesian President Prabowo Subianto's condemnation of Israel for its continued attacks on the Gaza Strip. This came after Israel's planned participation sparked intense opposition in Indonesia, according to Pramono Anung, governor of Jakarta. He cited the fact that many politicians and Muslim groups called for an Israeli ban for this competition, with Indonesian social media users objecting to the arrival of athletes from a country that is committing genocide. Furthermore, Indonesia has no diplomatic ties with Israel and has refused to host Israeli sports delegations going back to 1962, when Israel and Taiwan were denied entry to compete in the 1962 Asian Games. Originally, the Indonesian Gymnastics Federation had submitted a letter to sponsor six Israeli athletes for visas, but the letter had since been withdrawn. The FIG released a short statement saying that it "recognizes the challenges that the host country has faced in organizing the event" but did not comment on its statutes requiring that visas be issued to competitors.

In response to the refusal to issue visas, the Israel Gymnastics Federation (IGF) submitted an urgent appeal to the Court of Arbitration for Sport (CAS), seeking for their athletes to be allowed to compete, or alternatively that the competition be canceled or moved to an alternative location that will issue visas to all competitors. In their appeal, the IGF argued that the FIG statutes require the FIG Executive Committee to pass a decision to move or cancel the event if entry visas are not granted to all participating delegations. On October 14, the CAS rejected the appeal for urgent provisional measures, and therefore the competition would go on as scheduled and without Israeli participation. However, the second appeal, as to whether the FIG is in breach of their statutes, will remain ongoing, but it will not be heard before the start of the competition. After the start of the World championship, International Olympic Committee announced that it was ending "any form of dialogue" with Indonesia about hosting future Olympic events (including Youth Olympic Games, Olympic events and conferences). IOC also recommended all global sports federations to not hold events in Indonesia. Before this controversy, Indonesia was considered as one of candidate to hold 2036 Summer Olympic games.

== Iranian boycotts ==
In August 2019, Iranian judoka Saeid Mollaei refused to withdraw from a match at the 2019 World Judo Championships in Tokyo which would have required, had he won, to compete against an Israeli judoka Sagi Muki in the final. Though he lost, and so did not need to compete against the Israeli, Mollaei feared returning to his country and sought political asylum in Germany. Following the episode, the International Judo Federation (IJF) suspended Iran from competing in any future judo competition. In 2021, Court of Arbitration for Sport (CAS) lifted Iran's Judo Ban, saying there was "no legal basis" to ban Iran from the competitions for directing an athlete not to compete against an Israeli competitor. Later on, Egyptian judoka Mohamed Abdelaal refused to shake hands with Israeli Sagi Moki in the same championship. In October 2019, two Iranian teenagers also refused to play Israelis in a chess tournament. On 17 November 2019, the Israeli national anthem was played and Israeli flag flown in Abu Dhabi when 17-year-old Alon Leviev took gold in the junior category at the Ju-jitsu World Championship. In December 2019, Alireza Firouzja, the world's second-highest rated junior chess player, applied to renounce his Iranian citizenship over pressures on Iranian athletes to forego matches with Israeli competitor, the second Iranian sports figure in recent months to do so.

In November 2020, the International Chess Federation (FIDE) warned the Iranian Chess Federation (ICF) that it could be facing an imminent international ban for its continued refusal to allow Iranian chess players to compete against their Israeli equivalents.

In August 2023, Iranian weightlifter Mostafa Rajai was banned to compete for life by his federation, after talking to, shaking hands and taking a picture with Israeli Maksim Svirsky during a medal awarding ceremony at the World Masters Championship in Wieliczka, Poland.

== Athletes who have competed with Israel ==
In 2007, Mushir Salem Jawher, a Kenyan-born marathoner, lost his Bahraini citizenship after competing in the Tiberias Marathon in Israel, but later that year reacquired Bahraini citizenship and competed again in the Tiberias Marathon in 2008, 2009 and 2010.

Despite the country's international political issues, a growing number of Arab athletes are joining domestic Israeli sports teams and the international teams, including the Israel national football team. These include Rifaat Turk, Najwan Ghrayib, Walid Badir, Salim Toama, Abbas Suan, amongst others. Another Arab-Israeli, Johar Abu Lashin, born in Nazareth, was an IBO Welterweight champion.

In June 2018, Argentina cancelled a planned football friendly against Israel. The game was originally due to be played in Haifa, but was moved to Jerusalem, which is claimed by both Palestine and Israel as capital. Palestinians saw this as politicizing the match, as the stadium it was due to be played in sits on the site of a former Palestinian village. Israeli Minister of Culture Miri Regev denied that the game was being politicised by the move, but was being moved to celebrate the 70th anniversary of Israel. International pressure grew on Argentina to call off the game, led by the BDS campaign and the Palestinian Football Association. Threats were also made against Argentine players. The match was called off, with Argentina giving the reason as security concerns. The BDS campaign and Palestinian FA claimed a victory, with campaign group Avaaz thanking Argentina for their "brave ethical decision". Argentine Striker Gonzalo Higuain said they had "finally done the right thing", while Argentine Foreign Minister Jorge Faurie said he believed his country's footballers "were not willing to play the game", but also compared the threats his country's players received as "exceeding of (those of) ISIS." Israel's Defence Minister Avigdor Lieberman responded to the cancellation of the match by calling the BDS campaign "a pack of anti-Semitic terrorist supporters" and claimed that the Argentines could not "withstand the pressure of the Israeli-hating inciters". Culture Minister Regev blamed threats on Lionel Messi for the cancellation of the friendly match. In early November 2019, the BDS movement sought the cancellation of a football match between the national teams of Argentina and Uruguay scheduled to be held in Tel Aviv, Israel. The match took place on 19 November.

== Individual sporting boycott ==
Since the 21st century, Israeli athletes competing in tournaments have faced boycotts by athletes from Muslim countries (primarily Iran), speculated to be the result of political interferences.

=== Iran ===
Date	Retired athlete's name	Israeli athlete's name	Sport type	Event	Official reason for retiring	Ref
17 February 2001	Hamed Malekmohammadi	Yoel Razvozov	judo	2001 World Judo Championships		
22 June 2003	Iran national five-a-side football team	Israel national five-a-side football team	football	2003 Special Olympics World Summer Games		
15 August 2004	Arash Miresmaeili	Ehud Vaks	judo	2004 Summer Olympics		
4 August 2005	Iran U-21 men national basketball team	Israel U-21 men national basketball team	basketball	FIBA Under-21 World Championship	Visa issues	
28 January 2007	Ahmad Ksanfandi (referee)	Gal Yekutiel	judo	2007 Tbilisi judo Open		
18 September 2007	Mehdi Mohammadi	Ilia Shafran	amateur wrestling	2007 World Wrestling Championships		
10 August 2008	Mohammad Alirezaei	Tom Be'eri	swimming	2008 Summer Olympics	Indigestion	
28 July 2009	Mohammad Alirezaei	Michael Malul	swimming	2009 World Aquatics Championships		
30 September 2009	Mohammad Hossein Ebrahimi	Tomer Or	fencing	2009 World Fencing Championships		
1 October 2009	Ali Fadja	Slava Zingerman	fencing	2009 World Fencing Championships	Retired from entire competition	
1 October 2009	Mohammad Mohazzabnia	Tomer Hodorov	tennis	2009 Kenya Futures F1		
4 April 2010	Iran youth national volleyball team	Israel youth national volleyball team	volleyball	2010 International Volleyball Tournament Pordenone		
10 April 2010	Meisam Bagheri	Moty Lugassi	taekwondo	A-Class Belgian Open 2010		
28 April 2010	Iran men's national table tennis team	Israel men's national table tennis team	table tennis	2011 Luxembourg Table Tennis championship		
21 May 2010	Ali Shahhosseini	Misha Zilberman	badminton	2010 Spanish Open		
15 August 2010	Mohammad Soleimani	Gili Haimovitz	taekwondo	2010 Summer Youth Olympics		
4 November 2010	Hamed Sayyad Ghanbari	Maor Hatoel	fencing	2010 World Fencing Championships		
4 November 2010	Mohammad Hossein Ebrahimi	Kobi Hatoel	fencing	2010 World Fencing Championships		
5 November 2010	Hamed Sedaghati	Ido Herpe	fencing	2010 World Fencing Championships		
5 November 2010	Sadegh Abedi	Grigori Beskin	fencing	2010 World Fencing Championships		
24 July 2011	Mohammad Alirezaei	Gal Nevo	swimming	2011 World Aquatics Championships	Tiredness	
20 August 2011	Iran men's national volleyball team	Israel men's national volleyball team	volleyball	2011 Summer Universiade		
11 September 2011	Ghasem Rezaei	Robert Avanesyan	amateur wrestling	2011 World Wrestling Championships		
18 September 2011	Javad Mahjoub	Or Sasson	judo	World Cup Tashkent 2011		
10 October 2011	Shervin Tolouei	Oren Bassal	fencing	2011 World Fencing Championships		
5 November 2011	Kaveh Mehrabi	Misha Zilberman	badminton	2011 Puerto Rico International Challenge		
21 July 2015	Saber Hoshmand/Abbas Pourasgari	Sean Faiga/Ariel Hilman	beach volleyball	2015 FIVB Grand Slam Yokohama	injury	
27 January 2017	Majid Hassaninia	Jonathan Giller	karate	21st Open de Paris – Karate Premier League	"what is of paramount importance to every Iranian athlete is his/her beliefs plus support for the defenseless Palestinian nation"	
25 November 2017	Alireza Karimi	Uri Kalashnikov	wrestling	2017 World U23 Wrestling Championship	Lost prior match at instruction of coach.	
2 October 2018	Hossein Vafaei	Eden Sharav	snooker	2018 European Masters		
10 December 2018	Hossein Vafaei	Eden Sharav	snooker	2018 Scottish Open		
19 April 2019	Alireza Firouzja	Or Bronstein	chess	GRENKE Chess Open		
22 March 2022	Iran women's national ice hockey team	Israel women's national ice hockey team	Ice Hockey	2022 IIHF Women's World Championship Division III		
15 September 2022	Amir Yazdani	Josh Finesilver	Wrestling	2022 World Wrestling Championships	Required by coaches to miss weight, as to not wrestle the Israeli athlete in the first round of competition	
26 December 2022	Bardiya Daneshvar and Pouya Idani	Boris Gelfand	chess	World Rapid Chess Championship 2022		
2024			chess	Chess Olympiad		

=== Elsewhere ===
Date	Country origin	Boycotting athlete(s)/team	Israeli athlete(s)/team	Sport type	Event	Official reason for retiring	Ref
8 April 1970	Lebanon	Homenetmen	Hapoel Tel Aviv	football	1970 Asian Champion Club Tournament		
25 March 1971	Iraq	Aliyat Al-Shorta	Maccabi Tel Aviv	football	1971 Asian Champion Club Tournament		
2 April 1971	Iraq	Aliyat Al-Shorta	Maccabi Tel Aviv	football	1971 Asian Champion Club Tournament		
4 June 1979	Sri Lanka	Sri Lanka national cricket team	Israel national cricket team	cricket	1979 ICC Trophy		
26 July 2001	Tunisia	Sadok Khalki	Arik Zeevi	judo	2001 World Judo Championships		
6 July 2006	Indonesia	Indonesia Fed Cup team	Israel Fed Cup team	tennis	2006 Fed Cup		
19 July 2007	Kuwait	Mohammed al Ghareeb	Amir Weintraub	tennis	2007 Togliatti challenger	Stomach problems	
15 August 2008	Syria	Bayan Jumah	Anya Gostomelsky	swimming	2008 Summer Olympics		
7 February 2010	Kuwait	Kuwait men's national pool team	Israel men's national pool team	pool	2010 Hanover world team A championship	Food poisoning of four players	
5 May 2011	Algeria	Zakaria Chenouf	Adam Sagir	taekwondo	2011 World Taekwondo Championships		
1 October 2011	Algeria	Meriem Moussa	Shahar Levi	judo	World Cup Women Rome 2011		
1 October 2011	Algeria	Abdelmalek Rahou	Artem Masliy	boxing	2011 World Amateur Boxing Championships		
18 October 2013	Tunisia	Malek Jaziri	Amir Weintraub	tennis	2013 Tashkent Challenger		
7 August 2016	Saudi Arabia	Joud Fahmy	Christianne Legentil, Gili Cohen	judo	2016 Summer Olympics	Sustained injuries to her arm and leg during training; ostensibly dropped out of match with Christianne Legentil of Mauritius to avoid match with Gili Cohen in next round	
28 January 2019	Kuwait	Abdullah al-Anjari	Eitan Seri-Levi	jiu-jitsu	2019 Los Angeles International Jiu-jitsu Open		
February 2019	Lebanon	Nacif Elias	Li Kochman	judo	Paris Grand Slam 2019		
February 2019	Lebanon	Ezzeddine Faraj		taekwondo	2019 European Junior Championships		
March 2019	Lebanon	Bassam Safadieh		table tennis	2019 Table Tennis Mediterranean Championships U-15		
25 September 2019	Lebanon	Domenic Abounader	Uri Kalashnikov	amateur wrestling	2019 World Wrestling Championships		
November 2019	Jordan	Mohammed Eid	Amir Assad	kickboxing	2019 International Turkish Open Kickboxing European Cup		
3 June 2021	Jordan	Osama Abu Jame	Shmuel Ben Asor	table tennis	2021 World Para Table Tennis Championships		
July 2021	Algeria	Fethi Nourine	Tohar Butbul	judo	Judo at the 2020 Summer Olympics – Men's 73 kg	He withdrew from the previous round to avoid competing against an Israeli, as he had done before in the 2019 World Judo Championships in Tokyo against Butbul as well	
July 2021	Sudan	Mohamed Abdalarasool	Tohar Butbul	judo	Judo at the 2020 Summer Olympics – Men's 73 kg	He weighed in but did not show up to the match	
January 2022	Kuwait	Muhammad al-Awadi		tennis	2022 Dubai Tennis Championships for Juniors		
March 2022	Kuwait	Abdul Razzaq al-Baghli		surfing	The Emirates International Motosurf Championship		
May 2022	Kuwait	Bader Al-Hajiri		chess	Sunway Chess Tournament		
May 2022	Kuwait	Kholoud Al-Mutairi		fencing	2022 IWAS World Cup		
20 July 2022	Oman	Oman national university futsal team		futsal	FISU World University Championship Futsal		
11 August 2022	Iraq	Nasser Mahdi	Adam Berdichevsky	wheelchair tennis	Open Wheelchair Tennis Tournament		
11 August 2022	Iraq	Muhammad al-Mahdi	Sergei Lysov	wheelchair tennis	Open Wheelchair Tennis Tournament		
18 August 2022	Lebanon	Charbel Abou Daher	Yonatan Mak	mixed martial arts	Youth IMMAF World Championships		
September 2022	Kuwait	Muhammad al-Otaibi		karate	2022 Karate1 Premier League		
April 2023	Kuwait	Mohamed al-Fadli		fencing	Junior and Cadet Fencing World Championships	He had already withdrawn twice from competing against Israelis in September 2019 and April 2022.	
April 2023	Kuwait	Ahmed Awad		fencing	Junior and Cadet Fencing World Championships		
August 2023	Syria	Hammam Hashim Mualla		swimming	2023 FINA World Masters Championships		
28 September 2024	Bangladesh	Enamul Hossain		chess	2024 Chess Olympiad		

== See also ==
- Palestinian sports during the Israeli invasion of the Gaza Strip
- Academic boycott of Israel
- Antisemitism in the Olympic Games
- Jewish Olympics
- Muscular Judaism
- Sport policies of the Arab League
- Peace and Sport
- United Nations Office on Sport for Development and Peace
- International Day of Sport for Development and Peace
- Boycott of Russia and Belarus
- Sporting boycott of South Africa during the apartheid era
