= Boykoff =

Boykoff is a surname of Russian and Bulgarian origin. Notable people with the surname include:

- Harry Boykoff (1922–2001) American basketball player
- Jules Boykoff, American academic and soccer player
