= Joud Fahmy =

Saudi Arabian judoka (born 1994)

Joud Fahmy (Arabic: جود فهمي; born 20 February 1994) is a Saudi Arabian judoka. She was slated to represent Saudi Arabia in the 2016 Summer Olympics but she forfeited her first match.

Her father is a diplomat, and she has lived in Santa Monica, California since 2014. She is 1.64 m (5 ft 5 in) tall, and weighs 52 kg (115 lb) She competes in the -52 kg weight category.

== Anti-Israel controversy ==
Allegedly, Fahmy forfeited her match in order to avoid competing against Israeli judoka Gili Cohen in the second round. Fahmy, Saudi Arabia's news agency Al Arabiya, and the Saudi Olympic delegation said that Fahmy forfeited because she received injuries to her hands and feet in training. However, other media outlets such as Israel Channel 2 reported she was not injured.

Jim Nieto, the martial arts instructor who coached her before the Olympics, said it seemed fishy that she, after taking part in the Opening Ceremony, was reportedly injured so close to her fight date, because top competitors generally don't fight the day before their competition. He said "I feel sorry for her. Let her fight — even if she lasts 10 seconds. She busted her butt for almost a year to get there."

== See also ==
- Boycotts of Israel in individual sports
