= Antisemitism in the Olympic Games =

The modern Olympic Games or Olympics, are leading international sporting events featuring summer and winter sports competitions in which thousands of athletes from around the world participate in a variety of competitions. The Olympic Games are considered the world's foremost sports competition with more than 200 nations participating. The Olympic Games are held every four years, with the Summer and Winter Games alternating by occurring every four years but two years apart. In the Olympic Games during the years, despite its approach of "peace through sport", there have been many expressions of antisemitism, most notably in the Munich Massacre of 1972, which ended in the death of eleven Israeli athletes. The first official commemoration by the International Olympic Committee in acknowledgment of the massacre happened in 2016.

== The Olympic Games ==
=== Berlin – 1936 ===
- The 1936 Summer Olympics, held in Berlin, Germany soon after Adolf Hitler’s rise to power, were subjected to boycotts and racial discrimination. Jews were banned from the German team. Critics claimed that Hitler used the Olympic stage to propagate his own political ideologies. Hitler was also heavily criticized for his racist attitude towards the Jewish participants in the games. Recognizing the exploitation of the Olympic Games for political purposes by Hitler, a number of organizations and leading politicians called for a boycott of the games.

=== Munich – 1972 ===
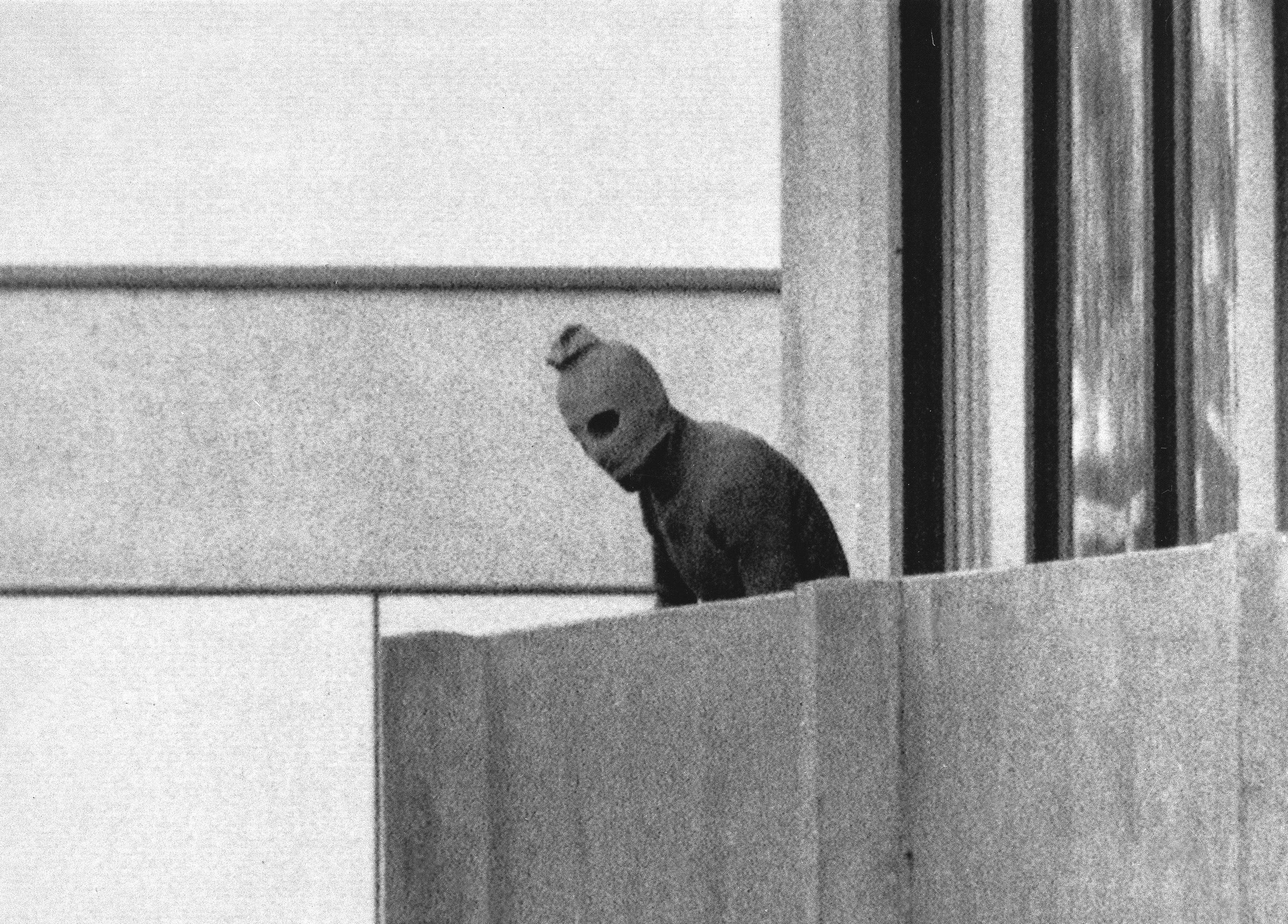
One of the Munich terrorists

- During the 1972 Summer Olympics in Munich, West Germany, eleven Israeli Olympic team members were taken hostage by the Palestinian terrorist group Black September who eventually killed them along with a German police officer. Shortly after the crisis began, they demanded 234 prisoners jailed in Israel and the German-held founders of the Red Army Faction (Andreas Baader and Ulrike Meinhof) be released. The attack was motivated by secular nationalism, with the commander of the terrorist group, Luttif Afif, claiming to have been born to Jewish and Christian parents. German neo-Nazis gave the attackers logistical assistance. Police officers killed five of the eight Black September members during a failed rescue attempt. They captured the three survivors, whom West Germany later released following hijacked Lufthansa Flight 615 in October. Mossad responded to the release with the 1973 Israeli raid on Lebanon and Operation Wrath of God, tracking down and killing Palestinians suspected of involvement in the massacre. On 3 August 2016, two days prior to the start of the 2016 Summer Olympics, the International Olympic Committee officially honored the eleven Israelis killed for the first time.

=== Moscow – 1980 ===
- Israel was one of the countries that boycotted the Moscow Olympics in protest of the Soviet invasion of Afghanistan, but also because of Soviet antisemitic and anti-Israel policies.

=== Athens – 2004 ===
- Iranian judoka Arash Miresmaeili was to fight the Israeli Ehud Vaks but was disqualified for being over the weight limit. In order to avoid implicit recognition of Israel, Iran forbids its athletes from competing against Israeli athletes. An Iranian National Olympic Committee spokesman said it was Iran's "general policy" not to face Israeli athletes. He earned public praise from the Iranian government. In an editorial, The Jerusalem Post said that Miresmaeili disqualified himself and listed it as an antisemitic incident.

=== London – 2012 ===
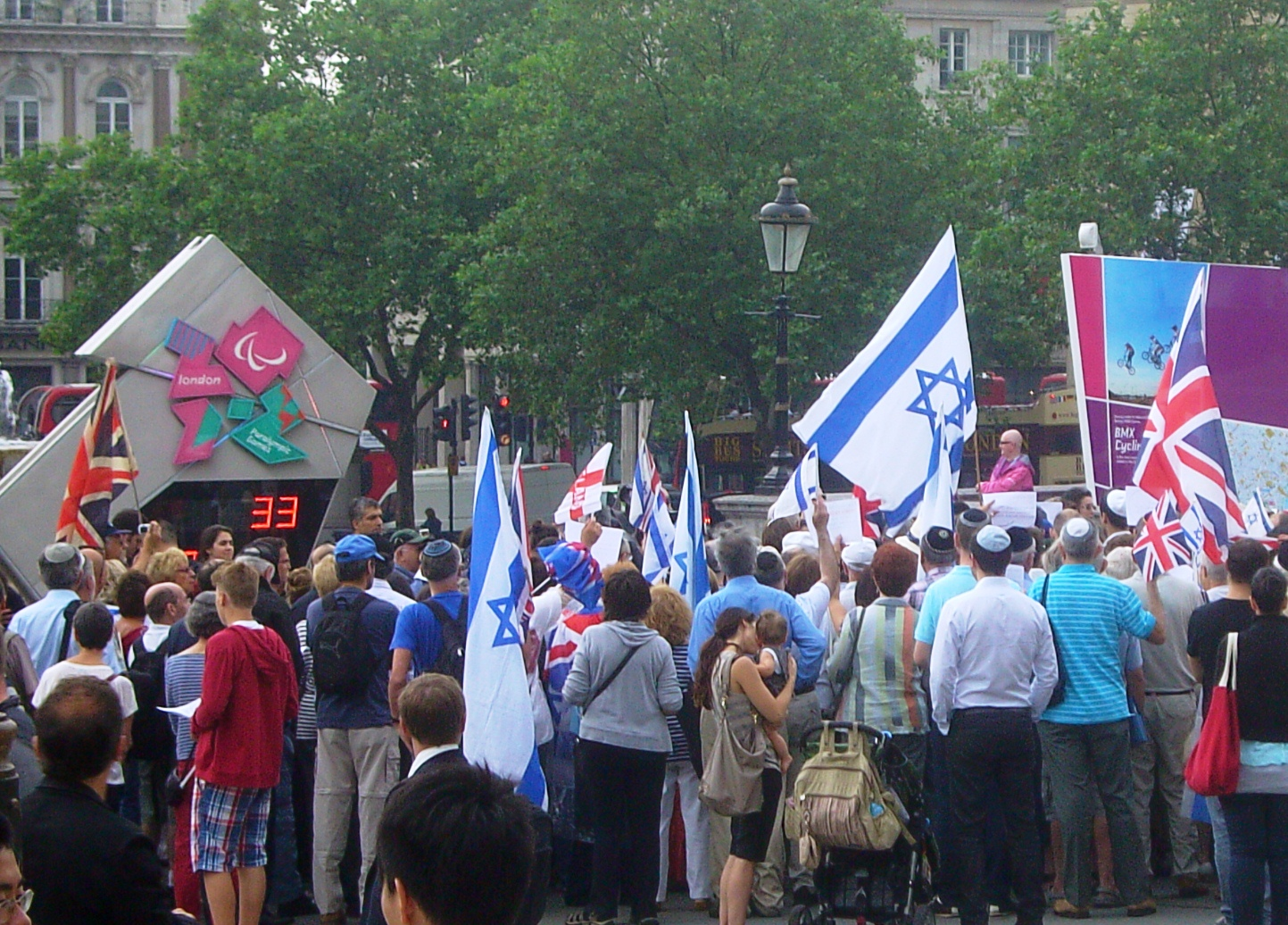
Remembering the Munich massacre, during London 2012

- At a ceremony for memory of the 11 Israeli athletes and coaches that were killed at the 1972 Summer Olympics, top Olympics' official Jacques Rogge came under criticism over the refusal to honor the dead with a minute's silence at the opening ceremony of London 2012. Instead, a week before the official opening of the Games, Rogge held a minute of silence during a minor ceremony in the Olympic village.

=== Rio de Janeiro – 2016 ===
- Lebanese Olympians refused to ride on a bus with Israeli athletes to get to the opening ceremony of the 2016 Summer Olympics. When the Israeli delegation of athletes and coaches tried to board the bus to Maracana stadium, the head of the Lebanese delegation blocked the entrance.

=== PyeongChang – 2018 ===
- The International Bobsleigh and Skeleton Federation was accused of antisemitism by an Israeli athlete who claimed that an official who disqualified a piece of equipment stated the reason as being "you people make all the rules, but not today."

== See also ==
- Boycotts of Israel in sports
- Jewish Olympics
- Muscular Judaism
