= Yarmouk Stadium =

Stadium in Gaza City, Palestine

Yarmouk Stadium ملعب اليرموك
- Interactive map of Yarmouk Stadium ملعب اليرموك
- Location: Gaza City, Gaza Governorate, Palestine
- Coordinates: 31°30′55.1″N 34°27′20.7″E
- Capacity: 9,000 (all seated)

Construction
- Opened: 1952
- Demolished: 8 January 2024

Tenant
- Gaza Sports Club

Yarmouk Stadium was a football stadium in Gaza City, Gaza. Yarmouk Stadium was one of the oldest Palestinian stadiums, opened in 1952 under Egyptian administration and was restored under the direct supervision of the Municipality of Gaza. It was the home stadium of the Gaza Sports Club. The stadium seated 9,000 spectators.

== Israeli invasion of Gaza ==
During the Gaza war, hundreds of Palestinians went to Yarmouk Stadium to find safety from Israeli bombing attacks.

On 24 December 2023, during the Israeli invasion of Gaza, the Israel Defense Forces (IDF) occupied the stadium, turning it into an internment camp. Hundreds of Palestinians from the Sheikh Radwan neighborhood of Gaza City were kidnapped and taken to the stadium. The kidnapped, including children as young as 10 years old and elderly people over the age of 70, were forced to take off all of their clothes except their underwear, with some victims also blindfolded.

On 27 December 2023, the Palestinian Football Association (PFA) sent letters to the International Olympic Committee (IOC) and The Fédération Internationale de Football Association (FIFA) asking for an "urgent international probe into occupation crimes against sports and athletes in Palestine". American academic and former professional soccer player Jules Boykoff described the double standards as "glaring" and questioned the IOC's treatment of Israel compared to Russia (which was sanctioned) stating, "If taking over sports facilities are a red line, why silence as Israel converts Gaza’s historic Yarmouk Stadium into an internment camp?"

On 8 January 2024, the Gaza Municipality announced that the IDF had demolished the stadium.

By July 2024, the remains of the stadium had become a refugee camp, housing thousands of displaced Palestinians.

== See also ==
- Sports in Palestine
- Football in Palestine
- Outline of the Gaza war
- Timeline of the Israeli–Palestinian conflict 2023
- Timeline of the Israeli–Palestinian conflict 2024
