= Jules Boykoff =

American academic and soccer player

- Boykoff in 2026
- Education: University of Portland (BA)
- Occupations: Academic, author
- Website: julesboykoff.org

Jules Boykoff is an American academic, author, and former professional soccer player. His research focuses on the politics of the Olympic Games, social movements, the suppression of dissent, and the role of the mass media in US politics, especially regarding coverage of climate change issues. Boykoff has written six books on the Olympic Games and two on soccer. His writing has been published in Al Jazeera, Jacobin, The Nation, The New York Times, and The Guardian, among many other venues. He is a frequent commentator and has appeared on CNN, Democracy Now! and The World, among many other outlets.

== Life and work ==
=== Soccer career ===
Jules Boykoff
Personal information
- Full name: Jason Boykoff
- Place of birth: Madison, Wisconsin
- Height: 5 ft 10 in (1.78 m)

College career
Years	Team	Apps	(Gls)
- Wisconsin Badgers
- Portland Pilots

Senior career*
Years	Team	Apps	(Gls)
1993–1996	Portland Pride (indoor)	98	(26)
1993–1994	Milwaukee Wave (indoor)	40	(3)

International career
1990	United States U-23		
- * Club domestic league appearances and goals

At the age of 19, Boykoff played for the United States men's national under-23 soccer team in the 1990 Toulon Tournament. He played two years for the University of Wisconsin before crossing to the University of Portland. After graduating, he was drafted in 1993 by indoor soccer team Portland Pride of the now folded Continental Indoor Soccer League. He also played in the now defunct National Professional Soccer League with team Milwaukee Wave. In all, he played four seasons of indoor professional soccer.

=== Academic career ===
Boykoff is a professor of Politics and Government at Pacific University, Oregon. He was also a visiting professor at Whitman College in Walla Walla, Washington during the 2004–2005 school year. Topics taught by Boykoff include US politics, the politics of surveillance, mass-media and politics, and the politics of literature and poetry. In November 2006, he spoke at the United Nations Climate Change Conference in Nairobi, Kenya, "COP 12". In An Inconvenient Truth, Al Gore mentioned work Boykoff co-authored with his brother Maxwell Boykoff (University of Colorado at Boulder, Department of Environmental Studies) on US media coverage of global warming.

Boykoff was also co-editor of The Tangent, a politics and art zine, and ran The Tangent Reading Series in Portland, Oregon.

In an article co-authored with Dave Zirin, Boykoff defended anti-zionist left-wing protests against Israel during the Gaza war as well as the use of the phrase "From the river to the sea, Palestine will be free". In the article, they wrote that liberal media was promoting Israel's "Big lie" on the war. The two also accused Israel of having weaponized the Holocaust for decades.

=== Critique of the Olympic Games and the World Cup ===
Boykoff lived in London in the lead-up to and during the 2012 Summer Olympics and in Rio de Janeiro as a Fulbright scholar during preparations for the 2016 Summer Olympics.

In July 2019, he interviewed two women in Tokyo who were displaced by the 1964 Summer Olympics and the 2020 Summer Olympics.

He released his book Red Card: The 2026 World Cup, Sportswashing, and the FIFA Greed Machine in June 2026, amidst the 2026 FIFA World Cup.

== Bibliography ==
=== Books ===
==== Nonfiction ====
- The Suppression of Dissent: How the State and Mass Media Squelch USAmerican Social Movements, Routledge, 2006, ISBN 978-0415978101
- Beyond Bullets: The Suppression of Dissent in the United States, AK Press, 2007, ISBN 978-1904859598
- Jules Boykoff; Kaia Sand (2008), Landscapes of Dissent: Guerrilla Poetry & Public Space, Palm Press, ISBN 978-0978926243
- Celebration Capitalism and the Olympic Games, Routledge, 2013, ISBN 9780415821971
- Activism and the Olympics: Dissent at the Games in Vancouver and London, Rutgers University Press, 2014, ISBN 978-0813562018
- Power Games: A Political History of the Olympics, Verso Books, 2016, ISBN 9781784780722
- NOlympians: Inside the Fight Against Capitalist Mega-Sports in Los Angeles, Tokyo and Beyond, Fernwood Publishing, 2020, ISBN 9781773632766
- The 1936 Berlin Olympics: Race, Power, and Sportswashing, Common Ground Research Networks, 2023, ISBN 9781957792248
- What Are the Olympics For?, Bristol University Press, 2024, ISBN 9781529230284
- Kicking, Duke University Press, 2026, ISBN 9781478038900
- Red Card: The 2026 World Cup, Sportswashing, and the FIFA Greed Machine, OR Books, 2026, ISBN 9781682195284

==== Poetry ====
- Once Upon a Neoliberal Rocket Badge: Edge Books, 2006. I ISBN 978-1890311216
- The Slow Motion Underneath (Hot Dream), collaboration with Jim Dine: Steidl, 2009. I ISBN 9783865216939
- Hegemonic Love Potion: Factory School, 2009. I ISBN 978-1600010620
- Fireworks: Tinfish Press, 2018. I ISBN 978-0998743875
