= Red Bull BC One Eastern European Finals =

Eastern European finals

This page provides the summary of RBBC1 Eastern European Qualifier/Finals.

Since 2012, Red Bull BC One has held a qualifier for the World Final in the Eastern European Region. The winner advances to the Red Bull BC One World Final.

== Winners ==
Year	Location	Winner	Crew
2015	Tbilisi, Georgia	(Kazakhstan) Killa Kolya	Simple System
2014	Zagreb, Croatia	(Russia) Cheerito	Illusion of Exist/EOS/FSAL
2013	Kyiv, Ukraine	(Ukraine) Robin	East Side Bboys/Top 9
2012	St. Petersburg, Russia	(Bulgaria) Slav	Slavic United
2011	Istanbul, Turkey	(Russia) Flying Buddha	Top 9

== 2015 ==
=== RBBC1 Eastern European 2015 results ===
Location: Tbilisi, Georgia

Judges:

- Pelezinho (Tsunami All Stars, Brazil)
- Lilou (Pockemon, France/Algeria)
- Mounir (Vagabonds, France)

Individuals in bold won their respective battles.

Round of 16
(Slovenia) Naki	L
(Ukraine) **Uzee Rock**	**W**
(Greece) **Onel**	**W**
(Azerbaijan) Quattro J	L
(Turkey) Jester	L
(Ukraine) **Robin**	**W**
(Romania) Marius	L
(Russia) **Gun**	**W**
(Croatia) **Lux de Lux**	**W**
(Bulgaria) Queen Mary	L
(Serbia) Padre	L
(Kazakhstan) **Killa Kolya**	**W**
(Armenia) Booble	L
(Georgia (country)) **Pioneer**	**W**
(Slovakia) Miniboj Killa	L
(Russia) **Stany the Game**	**W**

Quarter-finals
(Ukraine) **Uzee Rock**	**W**
(Greece) Onel	L
(Ukraine) **Robin**	**W**
(Russia) Gun	L
(Croatia) Lux de Lux	L
(Kazakhstan) **Killa Kolya**	**W**
(Georgia (country)) **Pioneer**	**W**
(Russia) Stany the Game	L

Semi-finals
(Ukraine) Uzee Rock	L
(Ukraine) **Robin**	**W**
(Kazakhstan) **Killa Kolya**	**W**
(Georgia (country)) Pioneer	L

Final
(Kazakhstan) **Killa Kolya**	**W**
(Ukraine) Robin	L
Third place

== 2014 ==
=== RBBC1 Eastern European 2014 results ===
Location: Zagreb, Croatia

Judges:

- Hong 10 (Drifterz/7 Commandoz, South Korea)
- Yan the Shrimp (Allthemost, Russia)
- Lamine (France)

Individuals in bold won their respective battles.

Round of 16
(Russia) **Cheerito**	**W**
(Slovenia) Vision	L
(Slovakia) **El Prcinho**	**W**
(Kazakhstan) Create	L
(Russia) **Flying Buddha**	**W**
(Azerbaijan) Stimo	L
(Greece) Onel	L
(Serbia) **Padre**	**W**
(Bulgaria) **Slav**	**W**
(Bosnia and Herzegovina) Justice	L
(Georgia (country)) **Pioneer**	**W**
(Croatia) Lux de Lux	L
(Serbia) **Goofy**	**W**
(Turkey) Jester	L
(Russia) **Bootuz**	**W**
(Moldavia) Jorik	L

Quarter-finals
(Russia) **Cheerito**	**W**
(Slovakia) El Prcinho	L
(Russia) **Flying Buddha**	**W**
(Serbia) Padre	L
(Bulgaria) **Slav**	**W**
(Georgia (country)) Pioneer	L
(Serbia) Goofy	L
(Russia) **Bootuz**	**W**

Semi-finals
(Russia) **Cheerito**	**W**
(Russia) Flying Buddha	L
(Bulgaria) **Slav**	**W**
(Russia) Bootuz	L

Final
(Russia) **Cheerito**	**W**
(Bulgaria) Slav	L
Third place

== 2013 ==
=== RBBC1 Eastern European 2013 results ===
Location: Kyiv, Ukraine

Round of 16
(Ukraine) **Robin**	**W**
(Georgia (country)) Pioneer	L
(Belarus) Open Space	L
(Slovenia) **Naki**	**W**
(Russia) **Cheerito**
(Croatia) 2nd Blind	L
(Israel) **Pick Up**	**W**
(Turkey) Ahmedo	L
(Kazakhstan) **Killa Kolya**	**W**
(Romania) China	L
(Russia) **Exact**	**W**
(Latvia) Stepy	L
(Serbia) Goofy	L
(Ukraine) **Pluto**	**W**
(Ukraine) **Kolobok**	**W**
(Bosnia and Herzegovina) Justice	L

Quarter-finals
(Ukraine) **Robin**	**W**
(Slovenia) Naki	L
(Russia) Cheerito	L
(Israel) **Pick Up**	**W**
(Kazakhstan) Killa Kolya	L
(Russia) **Exact**	**W**
(Ukraine) **Pluto**	**W**
(Ukraine) Kolobok	L

Semi-finals
(Ukraine) **Robin**	**W**
(Israel) Pick Up	L
(Russia) Exact	L
(Ukraine) **Pluto**	**W**

Final
(Ukraine) **Robin**	**W**
(Ukraine) Pluto	L
Third place

== 2012 ==
=== RBBC1 Eastern European 2012 results ===
Location: St. Petersburg, Russia

Individuals in bold won their respective battles.

Round of 16
(Albania) Just On Beat	L
(Greece) **Zoob**	**W**
(Bulgaria) **Slav**	**W**
(Ukraine) Intact	L
(Estonia) Marek	L
(Russia) **Jamal**	**W**
(Slovenia) Naki	L
(Russia) **Kosto**	**W**
(Turkey) Exen	L
(Poland) **Kleju**	**W**
(Iran) Farzin	L
(Kazakhstan) **Shadr**	**W**
(Azerbaijan) Killa Jazz	L
(Russia) **ExacT**	**W**
(Romania) **Franke**	**W**
(Ukraine) Pluto	L

Quarter-finals
(Greece) Zoob	L
(Bulgaria) **Slav**	**W**
(Russia) **Jamal**	**W**
(Russia) Kosto	L
(Poland) **Kleju**	**W**
(Kazakhstan) Shadr	L
(Russia) **ExacT**	**W**
(Romania) Franke	L

Semi-finals
(Bulgaria) **Slav**	**W**
(Russia) Jamal	L
(Poland) Kleju	L
(Russia) **ExacT**	**W**

Final
(Bulgaria) **Slav**	**W**
(Russia) ExacT	L
Third place

== 2011 ==
=== RBBC1 Eastern European 2011 results ===
Location: Istanbul, Turkey

Individuals in bold won their respective battles.

Round of 16
(Ukraine) **Uzee Rock**	**W**
(Iran) Reckless	L
(Ukraine) **Robin**	**W**
(Azerbaijan) Killa Jazz	L
(Slovenia) **Tomy**	**W**
(Latvia) Amega	L
(Ukraine) **Kolobok**	**W**
(Croatia) Lux de Lux	L
(Poland) **Kleju**	**W**
(Turkey) G-Hat	L
(Russia) **Flying Buddha**	**W**
(Italy) Marco	L
(Poland) Maniek	L
(Greece) **Lucky Look**	**W**
(Saudi Arabia) Lazy	L
(Ukraine) **Pluto**	**W**

Quarter-finals
(Ukraine) Uzee Rock	L
(Ukraine) **Robin**	**W**
(Slovenia) Tomy	L
(Ukraine) **Kolobok**	**W**
(Poland) Kleju	L
(Russia) **Flying Buddha**	**W**
(Greece) Lucky Look	L
(Ukraine) **Pluto**	**W**

Semi-finals
(Ukraine) **Kolobok**	**W**
(Ukraine) Robin	L
(Russia) **Flying Buddha**	**W**
(Ukraine) Pluto	L

Final
(Russia) **Flying Buddha**	**W**
(Ukraine) Kolobok	L
Third place
