= Red Bull BC One Latin American Finals =

This page provides the summary of RBBC1 Latin America Region Qualifier/Finals.

Since 2011, Red Bull BC One has held a qualifier for the World Final in the Latin America Region. The winner advances to the Red Bull BC One World Final.

== Winners ==
Year	Location	Winner	Crew	Runner-up	Crew
2015	Lima, Peru	(Brazil) Ratin	Killa Rockers Crew	(Brazil) Luan	Funk Fockers Gang
2014	Belém, Brazil	(Brazil) Luan	Funk Fockers Gang	(Venezuela) Lil G	Speedy Angels Family
2013	Bogotá, Colombia	(Colombia) Arex	Crew Peligrosos	(Mexico) Hill	Unik Breakers
2012	Monterrey, Mexico	(Brazil) Klesio	New Old School	(Mexico) Gato	Poker Hope Crew
2011	Salvador, Brazil	(Venezuela) Lil G	Speedy Angels Family	(Brazil) Kapu	Amazon Crew

== 2015 ==
=== RBBC1 Latin American 2015 results ===
Location: Lima, Peru

Round of 16
(Colombia) Hell Style	W
(Costa Rica) Alex	L
(Mexico) Omar	L
(Peru) Sinta Soul	W
(Venezuela) Sony	W
(Dominican Republic) Dux-M	L
(Brazil) Ratin	W
(Chile) Jorgito	L
(Brazil) Kapu	W
(Peru) Piedrita	L
(Venezuela) Lil G	W
(Cuba) Gannicus	L
(Brazil) Luan	W
(Colombia) Frada Step	L
(Mexico) Ztimpy	L
(Bolivia) Giroshi	W

Quarter-finals
(Colombia) Hell Style	W
(Peru) Sinta Soul	L
(Venezuela) Sony	L
(Brazil) Ratin	W
(Brazil) Kapu	L
(Venezuela) Lil G	W
(Brazil) Luan	W
(Bolivia) Giroshi	L

Semi-finals
(Colombia) Hell Style	L
(Brazil) Ratin	W
(Venezuela) Lil G	L
(Brazil) Luan	W

Final
(Brazil) Ratin	W
(Brazil) Luan	L
Third place

== 2014 ==
=== RBBC1 Latin American 2014 results ===
Location: Belém, Brazil

Round of 16
(Venezuela) Lil G	W
(Bolivia) Chukuta	L
(Mexico) Cirujano	W
(Chile) Javi Style	L
(Colombia) Arex	W
(Guatemala) Chama	L
(Brazil) Ratin	W
(Argentina) Matrix	L
(Brazil) Luan	W
(Chile) Shuky	L
(Venezuela) Kaos	W
(Cuba) Gannicus	L
(Brazil) Iguin	W
(Peru) Lima	L
(Mexico) Hill	W
(Colombia) Baby	L

Quarter-finals
(Venezuela) Lil G	W
(Mexico) Cirujano	L
(Colombia) Arex	L
(Brazil) Ratin	W
(Brazil) Luan	W
(Venezuela) Kaos	L
(Brazil) Iguin	W
(Mexico) Hill	L

Semi-finals
(Venezuela) Lil G	W
(Brazil) Ratin	L
(Brazil) Luan	W
(Brazil) Iguin	L

Final
(Brazil) Luan	W
(Venezuela) Lil G	L
Third place

== 2013 ==
=== RBBC1 Latin American 2013 results ===
Location: Bogotá, Colombia

Round of 16
(Mexico) Baby	L
(Brazil) Harrystil	W
(Colombia) Arex	W
(Guatemala) Tizon	L
(Brazil) Leony	W
(Peru) Roflow	L
(Colombia) Lil Drez	W
(Cuba) Balto	L
(Mexico) Hill	W
(Chile) Dani Chico	L
(Venezuela) H2	L
(Bolivia) Giroshi	W
(Brazil) Mixa	W
(Colombia) Mighty Kevin	L
(Venezuela) Shadyz	L
(Argentina) Fack	W

Quarter-finals
(Brazil) Harrystil	L
(Colombia) Arex	W
(Brazil) Leony	L
(Colombia) Lil Drez	W
(Mexico) Hill	W
(Bolivia) Giroshi	L
(Brazil) Mixa	W
(Argentina) Fack	L

Semi-finals
(Colombia) Arex	W
(Colombia) Lil Drez	L
(Mexico) Hill	W
(Brazil) Mixa	L

Final
(Colombia) Arex	W
(Mexico) Hill	L
Third place

== 2012 ==
=== RBBC1 Latin American 2012 results ===
Location: Monterrey, Mexico

Round of 16
(Argentina) Johny Breaker	L
(Brazil) Klesio	W
(El Salvador) Wolverine	L
(Venezuela) Salo	W
(Bolivia) Lil Mouse	L
(Brazil) Xandin	W
(Chile) Schuky	L
(Colombia) Lil Drez	W
(Guatemala) Jandro	L
(Mexico) Archi	W
(Peru) Roflow	L
(Brazil) Luan	W
(Colombia) Zkills	L
(Mexico) Gato	W
(Dominican Republic) Dux-M	L
(Venezuela) Enano	W

Quarter-finals
(Brazil) Klesio	W
(Venezuela) Salo	L
(Brazil) Xandin	W
(Colombia) Lil Drez	L
(Mexico) Archi	L
(Brazil) Luan	W
(Mexico) Gato	W
(Venezuela) Enano	L

Semi-finals
(Brazil) Klesio	W
(Brazil) Xandin	L
(Brazil) Luan	L
(Mexico) Gato	W

Final
(Brazil) Klesio	W
(Mexico) Gato	L
Third place

== 2011 ==
=== RBBC1 Latin American 2011 results ===
Location: Salvador, Brazil

Round of 16
(Venezuela) Lil G	W
(Argentina) Sisto	L
(Brazil) Klesio	W
(Chile) Panxo	L
(Venezuela) Salo	W
(El Salvador) Wolverine	L
(Mexico) Gato	W
(Bolivia) Ninja	L
(Honduras) Allan	L
(Brazil) Dan	W
(Brazil) Denis	W
(Mexico) Hill	L
(Brazil) Kapu	W
(Colombia) Arex	L
(Colombia) D.M	W
(Peru) 2U	L

Quarter-finals
(Venezuela) Lil G	W
(Brazil) Klesio	L
(Venezuela) Salo	W
(Mexico) Gato	L
(Brazil) Dan	L
(Brazil) Denis	W
(Brazil) Kapu	W
(Colombia) D.M	L

Semi-finals
(Venezuela) Lil G	W
(Venezuela) Salo	L
(Brazil) Denis	L
(Brazil) Kapu	W

Final
(Venezuela) Lil G	W
(Brazil) Kapu	L
Third place
