= 2023 in sports =

This page describes and summarizes the year 2023 in world sporting events.

The main events taking place this year include the 2023 Cricket World Cup in India, 2023 Rugby World Cup in France, and the 2023 FIFA Women's World Cup in Australia and New Zealand.

Most of the major Continental multi-sports events – the Pan American, European, Asian and Pacific Games – are held this year, one year ahead of the 2024 Summer Olympics in Paris, in addition to the Francophone Games. 2023 sees the first combined cycling world championships, including all disciplines except Cyclo-cross, and the first mixed-sex United Cup in tennis.

== Calendar by month ==
=== January ===
Date	Sport	Venue/Event	Status	Winner/s
15 December 2022 – 3	Darts	(England) 2023 PDC World Darts Championship	International	(England) Michael Smith
20 December 2022 – 16	Association football	(ASEAN) 2022 AFF Championship	Regional	Thailand
26 December 2022 – 5	Ice hockey	(Canada) 2023 World Junior Ice Hockey Championships	International	Canada
28 December 2022 – 6	Ski jumping	(Germany) / (Austria) 2022–23 Four Hills Tournament	International	(Norway) Halvor Egner Granerud
29 December 2022 – 8	Tennis	(Australia) 2023 United Cup	International	United States
31 December 2022 – 8	Cross-country skiing	(Switzerland) / (Germany) / (Italy) 2022–23 Tour de Ski	International	Men: (Norway) Johannes Høsflot Klæbo; Women: (Sweden) Frida Karlsson
31 December 2022 – 15	Rally raid	(Saudi Arabia) 2023 Dakar Rally (WRRC #1)	International	Bikes: (Argentina) Kevin Benavides; Quads: (France) Alexandre Giroud; Cars: (Qatar) Nasser Al-Attiyah; Light Proto: (United States) Austin Jones; SSV: (Poland) Eryk Goczał; Trucks: (Netherlands) Janus van Kasteren
2	Ice hockey	(United States) 2023 NHL Winter Classic	Domestic	Boston Bruins
6–8	Speed skating	(Norway) 2023 European Speed Skating Championships	Continental	Netherlands
6–19	Association football	(Iraq) 25th Arabian Gulf Cup	Regional	Iraq
6–22	Bowls	(England) 2023 World Indoor Bowls Championship	International	Open: (England) Jamie Walker; Women: (England) Katherine Rednall
8–15	Ice hockey	(Sweden) 2023 IIHF World Women's U18 Championship	International	Canada
8–15	Snooker	(England) 2023 Masters (Triple Crown #2)	International	(England) Judd Trump
8 – 1 July	Yacht racing	(Spain) / (Cape Verde) / (South Africa) / (Brazil) / (United States) / (Denmark) / (Netherlands) / (Italy) 2023 The Ocean Race	International	Volvo Ocean 65 class: (Poland) WindWhisper Racing Team IMOCA 60 class: (United States) 11th Hour Racing Team
9	American football	(United States) 2023 College Football Playoff National Championship	Domestic	(Georgia (U.S. state)) Georgia Bulldogs
11–28	Association football	(Fiji) 2023 OFC U-17 Championship	Continental	New Zealand
11–29	Handball	(Poland) / (Sweden) 2023 World Men's Handball Championship	International	Denmark
12–22	Multi-sport	(United States) 2023 Winter World University Games	International	Japan
13–15	Bobsleigh & Skeleton	(Germany) IBSF Junior World Championships 2023	International	Germany
13–15	Short-track speed skating	(Poland) 2023 European Short Track Speed Skating Championships	Continental	Netherlands
13–29	Field hockey	(India) 2023 Men's FIH Hockey World Cup	International	Germany
13 – 4 February	Association football	(Algeria) 2022 African Nations Championship	Continental	Senegal
14	Formula racing	2023 Mexico City ePrix (FE #1)	International	(United Kingdom) Jake Dennis ( (United States) Avalanche Andretti Formula E)
14–15	Luge	(Latvia) 2023 FIL European Luge Championships	Continental	Germany
14–29	Cricket	(South Africa) 2023 ICC Under-19 Women's T20 World Cup	International	India
16–22	Snooker	(England) 2023 World Grand Prix (Players Series #1)	International	(Northern Ireland) Mark Allen
16–29	Tennis	(Australia) 2023 Australian Open	International	Men: (Serbia) Novak Djokovic; Women: Aryna Sabalenka
17–22	Road bicycle racing	(Australia) 2023 Tour Down Under (UCI World Tour #1)	International	Men: (Australia) Jay Vine ( (United Arab Emirates) UAE Team Emirates); Women: (Australia) Grace Brown ( (France) FDJ–Suez)
17–26	Alpine skiing	(Austria) World Junior Alpine Skiing Championships 2023	International	Switzerland
17–26	Amateur boxing	(Thailand) 2023 Asian U22 Boxing Championships	Continental	Uzbekistan
19–22	Rallying	(Monaco) 2023 Monte Carlo Rally (WRC #1)	International	WRC: (France) Sébastien Ogier & (France) Vincent Landais ( (Japan) Toyota Gazoo Racing WRT); WRC-2: (France) Yohan Rossel & (France) Arnaud Dunand ( (France) PH Sport)
19–12 February	Association football	(Colombia) 2023 South American U-20 Championship	Continental	Brazil
20–22	Bobsleigh & Skeleton	(Germany) IBSF European Championships 2023	Continental	Germany
21	Mixed martial arts	(Brazil) UFC 283: Teixeira vs. Hill	International	(United States) Jamahal Hill
21–28	Multi-sport	(Italy) 2023 European Youth Olympic Winter Festival	Continental	France
21–29	Paralympic Nordic skiing	(Sweden) 2023 World Para Nordic Skiing Championships	International	Germany
21–29	Para-alpine skiing	(Spain) 2023 World Para Alpine Skiing Championships	International	Austria
25–29	Biathlon	(Switzerland) 2023 IBU Open European Championships	Continental	Norway
25–29	Figure skating	(Finland) 2023 European Figure Skating Championships	Continental	Italy
26–29	Beach volleyball	(Qatar) 2022 Volleyball World Beach Pro Tour Finals	International	Men: (Norway) Anders Mol / Christian Sørum; Women: (United States) Sara Hughes / Kelly Claes
26–5 February	Bobsleigh & Skeleton	(Switzerland) IBSF World Championships 2023	International	Germany
27–28	Formula racing	(Saudi Arabia) 2023 Diriyah ePrix (FE #2 & #3)	International	Race 1: (Germany) Pascal Wehrlein ( (Germany) TAG Heuer Porsche Formula E Team); Race 2: (Germany) Pascal Wehrlein ( (Germany) TAG Heuer Porsche Formula E Team)
27–29	Short-track speed skating	(Germany) 2023 World Junior Short Track Speed Skating Championships	International	South Korea
27–29	Luge	(Germany) 2023 FIL World Luge Championships	International	Germany
27–29	Rowing	(France) 2023 European Rowing Indoor Championships	Continental	United Kingdom
27–1 February	Baseball	(Pakistan) 2023 West Asia Baseball Cup	Continental	Pakistan
27–5 February	Nordic skiing	(Canada) 2023 Nordic Junior World Ski Championships	International	Norway
28–29	Motorsport	(Sweden) 2023 Race of Champions	International	(Sweden) Mattias Ekström
28–30	Canoe slalom	(New Zealand) 2023 Oceania Canoe Slalom Championships	Continental	New Zealand
29	Road bicycle racing	(Australia) 2023 Cadel Evans Great Ocean Road Race (UCI World Tour #2)	International	Men: (Germany) Marius Mayrhofer ( (Netherlands) Team DSM); Women: (Netherlands) Loes Adegeest ( (France) FDJ–Suez)
29–4 February	Multi-sport	(Canada) / (Alberta) 2023 Arctic Winter Games	Regional	Yukon

=== February ===
Date	Sport	Venue/Event	Status	Winner/s
1–11	Association football	(Morocco) 2022 FIFA Club World Cup	International	(Spain) Real Madrid
3–5	Cyclo-cross	(Netherlands) 2023 UCI Cyclo-cross World Championships	International	Men: (Netherlands) Mathieu van der Poel; Women: (Netherlands) Fem van Empel
3–5	Karate	(Cyprus) 2023 European Karate Cadet, Junior and U21 Championships	Continental	Spain
3–5	Skateboarding	(United Arab Emirates) 2023 Street Skateboarding World Championships	International	Men: (France) Aurélien Giraud; Women: (Brazil) Rayssa Leal
4	Ice hockey	(United States) 2023 National Hockey League All-Star Game	Domestic	Atlantic Division
4 – 18 March	Rugby union	(England) / (France) / (Ireland) / (Italy) / (Scotland) / (Wales) 2023 Six Nations Championship	Continental	Ireland
4 – 19 March	Rugby union	(Belgium) / (Georgia (country)) / (Germany) / (Netherlands) / (Poland) / (Portugal) / (Romania) / (Spain) 2023 Rugby Europe Championship	Continental	Georgia
5	Flag football	(United States) 2023 Pro Bowl	Domestic	National Football Conference
5–11	Indoor hockey	(South Africa) 2023 Men's FIH Indoor Hockey World Cup (South Africa) 2023 Women's FIH Indoor Hockey World Cup	International	Men: Austria; Women: Netherlands
5–12	Skateboarding	(United Arab Emirates) 2023 Park Skateboarding World Championships	International	Men: (United States) Jagger Eaton; Women: (United Kingdom) Sky Brown
5	Stock car racing	(United States) 2023 NASCAR Cup Series	Domestic	(United States) Ryan Blaney
6–12	Beach soccer	(El Salvador) 2023 Americas Winners Cup	Continental	Men: (Brazil) Barra de Santiago; Women: (Brazil) São Pedro (beach soccer)
6–19	Alpine skiing	(France) FIS Alpine World Ski Championships 2023	International	Switzerland
7–12	Figure skating	(United States) 2023 Four Continents Figure Skating Championships	International	Japan
8–11	Baseball5	(Malaysia) 2023 Youth Baseball5 Asia Cup	Continental	Chinese Taipei
8–19	Biathlon	(Germany) Biathlon World Championships 2023	International	Norway
8–12	Track cycling	(Switzerland) 2023 UEC European Track Championships	Continental	Germany
9–12	Rallying	2023 Rally Sweden (WRC #2)	International	WRC: (Estonia) Ott Tänak & (Estonia) Martin Järveoja ( (United Kingdom) M-Sport Ford WRT); WRC-2: (Sweden) Oliver Solberg & (United Kingdom) Elliott Edmondson; WRC-3: (Finland) Roope Korhonen & (Finland) Anssi Viinikka; J-WRC: (Republic of Ireland) William Creighton & (Republic of Ireland) Liam Regan
10–11	Korfball	(Netherlands) 2023 IKF Europe Korfball Champions League Finals	Continental	(Netherlands) PKC/Vertom
10–12	Athletics	(Kazakhstan) 2023 Asian Indoor Athletics Championships	Continental	Japan
10–12	Basketball	(Spain) 2023 FIBA Intercontinental Cup	International	(Spain) Lenovo Tenerife
10–12	Speed skating	(Germany) 2023 World Junior Speed Skating Championships	International	Netherlands
10–26	Cricket	(South Africa) 2023 ICC Women's T20 World Cup	International	Australia
11	Formula racing	(India) 2023 Hyderabad ePrix (FE #4)	International	(France) Jean-Éric Vergne ( (United States) DS Penske)
11–19	Multi-sport	(Turkey) 2023 ISF World School Winter Games	International	Cancelled due to 2023 Turkey–Syria earthquake
11–25	Rugby union	(Netherlands) / (Spain) 2023 Rugby Europe Women's Championship	Continental	Spain
11–26	Association football	(Guatemala) 2023 CONCACAF U-17 Championship	Continental	Mexico
12	American football	(United States) Super Bowl LVII	Domestic	(Missouri) Kansas City Chiefs
12	Mixed martial arts	(Australia) UFC 284: Makhachev vs. Volkanovski	International	(Russia) Islam Makhachev
13–19	Badminton	(South Africa) 2023 African Badminton Championships	Continental	Egypt
13–19	Badminton	(New Zealand) 2023 Oceania Badminton Championships	Continental	Australia
14–18	Badminton	(France) 2023 European Mixed Team Badminton Championships	Continental	Denmark
14–19	Badminton	(United Arab Emirates) 2023 Badminton Asia Mixed Team Championships	Continental	China
15–19	Biathlon	(Latvia) 2023 IBU Junior Open European Championships	Continental	Italy
16–19	Badminton	(Mexico) 2023 Pan Am Badminton Championships (Team)	Continental	Canada
17 – 3 November	Stock car racing	(United States) 2023 NASCAR Craftsman Truck Series	Domestic	(United States) Ben Rhodes
18	Athletics	(Australia) 2023 World Athletics Cross Country Championships	International	Kenya
18	Ice hockey	(Sweden) 2023 Champions Hockey League Final	Continental	(Finland) Tappara
18	Ice hockey	(United States) 2023 NHL Stadium Series	Domestic	(North Carolina) Carolina Hurricanes
18 – 4 November	Stock car racing	(United States) 2023 NASCAR Xfinity Series	Domestic	(United States) Cole Custer
19	Basketball	(United States) 2023 NBA All-Star Game	Domestic	Team Giannis
19	Stock car racing	(United States) 2023 Daytona 500	Domestic	Ricky Stenhouse Jr. (JTG Daugherty Racing)
19 – 4 March	Freestyle skiing & Snowboarding	(Georgia (country)) FIS Freestyle Ski and Snowboarding World Championships 2023	International	Austria
19 – 11 March	Association football	(Egypt) 2023 Africa U-20 Cup of Nations	Continental	Senegal
20–24	Archery	(Turkey) 2023 European Indoor Archery Championships	Continental	Cancelled due to 2023 Turkey–Syria earthquake
20–26	Snooker	(England) 2023 Players Championship (Players Series #2)	International	(England) Shaun Murphy
20–26	Road bicycle racing	(United Arab Emirates) 2023 UAE Tour (UCI World Tour #3)	International	(Belgium) Remco Evenepoel ( (Belgium) Soudal–Quick-Step)
21 & 28	Association football	(Ecuador) / (Brazil) 2023 Recopa Sudamericana	Continental	(Ecuador) Independiente del Valle
22 – 5 March	Nordic skiing	(Slovenia) FIS Nordic World Ski Championships 2023	International	Norway
24 – 26 March	Powerboat racing	(Indonesia) 2023 F1 Powerboat World Championship	International	(Poland) Bartek Marszalek ( (Poland) Strømøy Racing F1 H2O Team)
25	Formula racing	(South Africa) 2023 Cape Town ePrix (FE #5)	International	(Portugal) António Félix da Costa ( (Germany) TAG Heuer Porsche Formula E Team)
25	Horse racing	(Saudi Arabia) 2023 Saudi Cup	International	Horse: (Japan) Panthalassa; Jockey: (Japan) Yutaka Yoshida; Trainer: (Japan) Yoshito Yahagi
25	Road bicycle racing	(Belgium) 2023 Omloop Het Nieuwsblad (UCI World Tour #4)	International	Men: (Netherlands) Dylan van Baarle ( (Netherlands) Team Jumbo–Visma); Women: (Belgium) Lotte Kopecky ( (Netherlands) SD Worx)
25–26	Motorcycle racing	(Australia) 2023 WSBK Australian round	International	R1: (Spain) Álvaro Bautista ( (Italy) Aruba.it Racing – Ducati); SR: (Spain) Álvaro Bautista ( (Italy) Aruba.it Racing – Ducati); R2: (Spain) Álvaro Bautista ( (Italy) Aruba.it Racing – Ducati)
25–26	Rowing	(Canada) 2023 World Rowing Indoor Championships	International	United States
25–26	Table tennis	(Switzerland) 2023 Europe Top 16 Cup	Continental	Men: (Slovenia) Darko Jorgić; Women: (Germany) Han Ying
25 – 4 March	Curling	(Germany) 2023 World Junior Curling Championships	International	Men: China; Women: Scotland
27 – 5 March	Figure skating	(Canada) 2023 World Junior Figure Skating Championships	International	Japan
27 – 5 March	Ski mountaineering	(Spain) 2023 World Championship of Ski Mountaineering	International	France
28 – 4 March	Snooker	(Thailand) 2023 World Women's Snooker Championship	International	(Thailand) Siripaporn Nuanthakhamjan

=== March ===
Date	Sport	Venue/Event	Status	Winner/s
1–7	Fencing	(Colombia) 2023 Pan American Cadets and Juniors Fencing Championships	Continental	United States
1–18	Association football	(Uzbekistan) 2023 AFC U-20 Asian Cup	Continental	Uzbekistan
2–5	Athletics	(Turkey) 2023 European Athletics Indoor Championships	Continental	Norway
2–5	Speed skating	(Netherlands) 2023 World Single Distances Speed Skating Championships	International	Netherlands
3–5	Motorcycle racing	(Indonesia) 2023 WSBK Mandalika round	International	R1: (Spain) Álvaro Bautista ( (Italy) Aruba.it Racing – Ducati); SR: (Turkey) Toprak Razgatlıoğlu ( (Japan) Pata Yamaha Prometeon WorldSBK); R2: (Spain) Álvaro Bautista ( (Italy) Aruba.it Racing – Ducati)
4	Road bicycle racing	(Italy) 2023 Strade Bianche (UCI World Tour #5)	International	Men: (United Kingdom) Thomas Pidcock ( (United Kingdom) INEOS Grenadiers); Women: (Netherlands) Demi Vollering ( (Netherlands) SD Worx)
4–12	Biathlon	(Kazakhstan) Biathlon Junior World Championships 2023	International	Germany
4–12	Curling	(Canada) 2023 World Wheelchair Curling Championship	International	China
4–12	Curling	(Canada) 2023 World Wheelchair Mixed Doubles Curling Championship	International	Latvia
5	Formula racing	2023 Bahrain Grand Prix (F1 #1)	International	(Netherlands) Max Verstappen ( (Austria) Red Bull Racing-Honda RBPT)
5	Marathon	(Japan) 2023 Tokyo Marathon	International	Men: (Ethiopia) Gelmisa Deso; Women: (Kenya) Rosemary Wanjiru
5	Mixed martial arts	(United States) UFC 285: Jones vs. Gane	International	(United States) Jon Jones
5–12	Road bicycle racing	(France) 2023 Paris–Nice (UCI World Tour #6)	International	(Slovenia) Tadej Pogačar ( (United Arab Emirates) UAE Team Emirates)
5–15	Shooting	(Estonia) 2023 European 10 m Events Championships	Continental	Norway
5 – 10 September	Indy car racing	(United States) / (Canada) 2023 IndyCar Series	International	Drivers' champion: (Spain) Álex Palou
6–11	Six-red snooker	(Thailand) 2023 Six-red World Championship	International	(China) Ding Junhui
6–12	Road bicycle racing	(Italy) 2023 Tirreno–Adriatico (UCI World Tour #7)	International	(Slovenia) Primož Roglič ( (Netherlands) Team Jumbo–Visma)
7	Cross country running	(Nepal) 2023 Asian Cross Country Championships	Continental	India
8–19	Tennis	(United States) 2023 Indian Wells Masters	International	Men: (Spain) Carlos Alcaraz; Women: (Kazakhstan) Elena Rybakina
8–21	Baseball	(Japan) / (Taiwan) / (United States) 2023 World Baseball Classic	International	Japan
9–12	Golf	(United States) 2023 Players Championship	International	(United States) Scottie Scheffler
10–12	Short-track speed skating	(South Korea) 2023 World Short Track Speed Skating Championships	International	Netherlands
11–12	Athletics	(Portugal) 2023 European Throwing Cup	Continental	Ukraine
11–19	Beach soccer	(Argentina) 2023 Copa América de Beach Soccer	Continental	Brazil
12–16	Field hockey	(Egypt) 2023 Men's Hockey Junior Africa Cup (Egypt) 2023 Women's Hockey Junior Africa Cup	Continental	Men: South Africa; Women: South Africa
13–19	Wrestling	(Romania) 2023 European U23 Wrestling Championships	Continental	Azerbaijan
14 – 3 April	Basketball	(United States) 2023 NCAA Division I men's basketball tournament	Domestic	(Connecticut) UConn Huskies
15 – 2 April	Basketball	(United States) 2023 NCAA Division I women's basketball tournament	Domestic	(Louisiana) LSU Tigers
15–26	Boxing	(India) 2023 IBA Women's World Boxing Championships	International	India
16–19	Rallying	2023 Rally Mexico (WRC #3)	International	WRC: (France) Sébastien Ogier & (France) Vincent Landais ( (Japan) Toyota Gazoo Racing WRT); WRC-2: (United Kingdom) Gus Greensmith & (United Kingdom) Jonas Andersson; WRC-3: (Paraguay) Diego Dominguez Jr. & (Spain) Rogelio Peñate
16–26	Beach soccer	(Thailand) 2023 AFC Beach Soccer Asian Cup	Continental	Iran
17	Endurance racing	(United States) 2023 1000 Miles of Sebring (WEC #1)	International	Hypercar: (United Kingdom) Mike Conway, (Japan) Kamui Kobayashi & (Argentina) José María López ( (Japan) Toyota Gazoo Racing); LMP2: (Portugal) Filipe Albuquerque, (United Kingdom) Philip Hanson & (United Kingdom) Frederick Lubin ( (United Kingdom) United Autosports); LMGTE-Am: (Netherlands) Nicky Catsburg, (United States) Ben Keating & (Argentina) Nicolás Varrone ( (United States) Corvette Racing)
17–19	Futsal	(Hungary) UEFA Women's Futsal Euro 2023 Finals	Continental	Spain
18	Road bicycle racing	(Italy) 2023 Milan–San Remo (UCI World Tour #8)	International	(Netherlands) Mathieu van der Poel ( (Belgium) Alpecin–Deceuninck)
18	Mixed martial arts	(United Kingdom) UFC 286: Edwards vs. Usman 3	International	(England) Leon Edwards
18–26	Curling	(Sweden) 2023 World Women's Curling Championship	International	Switzerland
19	Formula racing	(Saudi Arabia) 2023 Saudi Arabian Grand Prix (F1 #2)	International	(Mexico) Sergio Pérez ( (Austria) Red Bull Racing-Honda RBPT)
19–25	Air sports	(Lithuania) 2023 FAI F3P World Championships	International	France
20–26	Figure skating	(Japan) 2023 World Figure Skating Championships	International	Japan
20–26	Road bicycle racing	(Spain) 2023 Volta a Catalunya (UCI World Tour #9)	International	(Slovenia) Primož Roglič ( (Netherlands) Team Jumbo–Visma)
21–25	Telemark skiing	(Switzerland) 2023 World Telemarking Championships	International	Switzerland
22 – 2 April	Tennis	(United States) 2023 Miami Open	International	Men: Daniil Medvedev; Women: (Czech Republic) Petra Kvitová
22	Road bicycle racing	(Belgium) 2023 Classic Brugge–De Panne (UCI World Tour #10)	International	Men: (Belgium) Jasper Philipsen ( (Belgium) Alpecin–Deceuninck); Women: (United Kingdom) Pfeiffer Georgi ( (Netherlands) Team DSM)
22–26	Golf	(United States) 2023 WGC Match Play	International	(United States) Sam Burns
22–26	Karate	(Spain) 2023 European Karate Championships	Continental	Germany
23–25	Freestyle skiing	(Italy) 2023 FIS Junior Freestyle Moguls Championship	International	United States
24	Road bicycle racing	(Belgium) 2023 E3 Saxo Classic (UCI World Tour #11)	International	(Belgium) Wout van Aert ( (Netherlands) Team Jumbo–Visma)
24–26	Triathlon	(Norway) 2023 World Triathlon Winter Championships	International	Men: (Norway) Hans Christian Tungesvik; Women: (Italy) Sandra Mairhofer
24–27	Snowboarding	(Bulgaria) 2023 FIS Junior Snowboard Alpine World Championship	International	Bulgaria
25	Formula racing	(Brazil) 2023 São Paulo ePrix (FE #6)	International	(New Zealand) Mitch Evans ( (United Kingdom) Jaguar TCS Racing)
25	Horse racing	(United Arab Emirates) 2023 Dubai World Cup	International	Horse: (Japan) Ushba Tesoro; Jockey: (Japan) Yuga Kawada; Trainer: (Japan) Noboru Takagi
25 – 1 April	Weightlifting	(Albania) 2023 Youth World Weightlifting Championships	International	Turkey
25 – 29 April	Rugby union	(England) / (France) / (Ireland) / (Italy) / (Scotland) / (Wales) 2023 Women's Six Nations Championship	Continental	England
26	Road bicycle racing	(Belgium) 2023 Gent–Wevelgem (UCI World Tour #12)	International	Men: (France) Christophe Laporte ( (Netherlands) Team Jumbo–Visma); Women: (Switzerland) Marlen Reusser ( (Netherlands) SD Worx)
26	Motorcycle racing	(Portugal) 2023 Portuguese motorcycle Grand Prix (MotoGP #1)	International	MotoGP: (Italy) Francesco Bagnaia ( (Italy) Ducati Lenovo Team); Moto2: (Spain) Pedro Acosta ( (Finland) Red Bull KTM Ajo); Moto3: (Spain) Daniel Holgado ( (France) Red Bull KTM Tech3)
27–28	Freestyle skiing	(Italy) 2023 FIS Junior Freestyle Ski Cross World Championship	International	Switzerland
27 – 1 April	Weightlifting	(Argentina) 2023 Pan American Weightlifting Championships	Continental	United States
27 – 2 April	Snooker	(England) 2023 Tour Championship (Players Series #3)	International	(England) Shaun Murphy
28 – 2 April	Bandy	(Sweden) 2023 Bandy World Championship (Sweden) 2023 Women's Bandy World Championship	International	Men: Sweden; Women: Sweden
29–30	Freestyle skiing	(Austria) 2023 FIS Junior Freestyle Ski Aerials World Championship	International	China
29 – 2 April	3x3 basketball	(Singapore) 2023 FIBA 3x3 Asia Cup	Continental	Men: Mongolia; Women: Australia
29 – 2 April	Gymnastics	(Turkey) 2023 Junior World Artistic Gymnastics Championships	International	Japan
29	Road bicycle racing	(Belgium) 2023 Dwars door Vlaanderen (UCI World Tour #13)	International	Men: (France) Christophe Laporte ( (Netherlands) Team Jumbo–Visma); Women: (Netherlands) Demi Vollering ( (Netherlands) SD Worx)
30–31	Snowboarding	(Italy) 2023 FIS Junior Snowboard Cross World Championship	International	France
30 – 23 April	Association football	(Ecuador) 2023 South American U-17 Championship	Continental	Brazil
30 – 1 October	Baseball	(Canada) / (United States) 2023 Major League Baseball season	Domestic	(United States) Texas Rangers

=== April ===
Date	Sport	Venue/Event	Status	Winner/s
1–8	Softball	(Peru) 2023 U-15 Women's Softball Pan American Championship	Continental	United States
1–9	Curling	(Canada) 2023 World Men's Curling Championship	International	Scotland
1–9	Fencing	(Bulgaria) 2023 World Cadets and Juniors Fencing Championships	International	United States
2	Formula racing	(Australia) 2023 Australian Grand Prix (F1 #3)	International	(Netherlands) Max Verstappen ( (Austria) Red Bull Racing-Honda RBPT)
2	Motorcycle racing	(Argentina) 2023 Argentine Republic motorcycle Grand Prix (MotoGP #2)	International	MotoGP: (Italy) Marco Bezzecchi ( (Italy) Mooney VR46 Racing Team); Moto2: (Italy) Tony Arbolino ( (Belgium) Elf Marc VDS Racing Team); Moto3: (Japan) Tatsuki Suzuki ( (Luxembourg) Leopard Racing)
2	Road bicycle racing	(Belgium) 2023 Tour of Flanders (UCI World Tour #14)	International	Men: (Slovenia) Tadej Pogačar ( (United Arab Emirates) UAE Team Emirates); Women: (Belgium) Lotte Kopecky ( (Netherlands) SD Worx)
2–8	Softball	(South Korea) 2023 Asian Women's Softball Championship	Continental	Japan
3–8	Road bicycle racing	(Spain) 2023 Tour of the Basque Country (UCI World Tour #15)	International	(Denmark) Jonas Vingegaard ( (Netherlands) Team Jumbo–Visma)
4–8	Equestrian	(United States) 2023 FEI World Cup Finals (show jumping and dressage)	International	Show jumping: (Sweden) Henrik von Eckermann; Dressage: (Germany) Jessica von Bredow-Werndl
5–9	Table tennis	(Bosnia and Herzegovina) 2023 European Under-21 Table Tennis Championships	Continental	Men: (Poland) Miłosz Redzimski; Women: (Croatia) Hana Arapović
5–16	Ice hockey	(Canada) 2023 IIHF Women's World Championship	International	United States
6	Association football	(England) 2023 Women's Finalissima	International	England
6–9	Golf	(United States) 2023 Masters Tournament	International	(Spain) Jon Rahm
6–10	Field hockey	(Netherlands) 2023 Men's Euro Hockey League (Netherlands) 2023 Women's Euro Hockey League	Continental	Men: (Netherlands) Bloemendaal; Women: (Netherlands) Den Bosch
7 – 1 May	Chess	(Kazakhstan) World Chess Championship 2023	International	(China) Ding Liren
8	Mixed martial arts	(United States) UFC 287: Pereira vs. Adesanya 2	International	(New Zealand) Israel Adesanya
9	Road bicycle racing	(France) 2023 Paris–Roubaix (UCI World Tour #16)	International	Men: (Netherlands) Mathieu van der Poel ( (Belgium) Alpecin–Deceuninck); Women: (Canada) Alison Jackson ( (United States) EF Education–Tibco–SVB)
9–14	Wrestling	(Kazakhstan) 2023 Asian Wrestling Championships	Continental	Kazakhstan
9–16	Tennis	(Monaco) 2023 Monte-Carlo Masters	International	Andrey Rublev
10–18	Field hockey	(Barbados) 2023 Men's Junior Pan American Championship (Barbados) 2023 Women's Pan American Junior Championship	Continental	Men: Argentina; Women: United States
11–16	Artistic gymnastics	(Turkey) 2023 European Artistic Gymnastics Championships	Continental	Great Britain
13–16	Figure skating	(Japan) 2023 ISU World Team Trophy in Figure Skating	International	United States
14–16	Basketball	(Czech Republic) 2023 EuroLeague Women Final Four	Continental	(Turkey) Fenerbahçe
15	Horse racing	(United Kingdom) 2023 Grand National	International	Horse: (Republic of Ireland) Corach Rambler; Jockey: (Republic of Ireland) Derek Fox; Trainer: (Scotland) Lucinda Russell
15–23	Softball	(Argentina) 2023 U-23 Men's Softball World Cup	International	Australia
15–23	Weightlifting	(Armenia) 2023 European Weightlifting Championships	Continental	Armenia
15 – 1 May	Snooker	(England) 2023 World Snooker Championship (Triple Crown #3)	International	(Belgium) Luca Brecel
16	Endurance racing	(Portugal) 2023 6 Hours of Portimão (WEC #2)	International	Hypercar: (Switzerland) Sébastien Buemi, (New Zealand) Brendon Hartley & (Japan) Ryo Hirakawa ( (Japan) Toyota Gazoo Racing); LMP2: (Netherlands) Giedo van der Garde, (United Kingdom) Oliver Jarvis & (United States) Josh Pierson ( (United Kingdom) United Autosports); LMGTE-Am: (Netherlands) Nicky Catsburg, (United States) Ben Keating & (Argentina) Nicolás Varrone ( (United States) Corvette Racing)
16	Formula racing	(China) 2023 Chinese Grand Prix	International	Cancelled
16	Motorcycle racing	(United States) 2023 Motorcycle Grand Prix of the Americas (MotoGP #3)	International	MotoGP: (Spain) Álex Rins ( (Monaco) LCR Honda Castrol); Moto2: (Spain) Pedro Acosta ( (Finland) Red Bull KTM Ajo); Moto3: (Spain) Iván Ortolá ( (Italy) Angeluss MTA Team)
16	Road bicycle racing	(Netherlands) 2023 Amstel Gold Race (UCI World Tour #17)	International	Men: (Slovenia) Tadej Pogačar ( (United Arab Emirates) UAE Team Emirates); Women: (Netherlands) Demi Vollering ( (Netherlands) SD Worx)
16–23	Weightlifting	(Dominican Republic) 2023 Central American & Caribbean Weightlifting Championships	Regional	Colombia
17	Marathon	(United States) 2023 Boston Marathon	International	Men: (Kenya) Evans Chebet; Women: (Kenya) Hellen Obiri
17–23	Wrestling	(Croatia) 2023 European Wrestling Championships	Continental	Turkey
19	Road bicycle racing	(Belgium) 2023 La Flèche Wallonne (UCI World Tour #18)	International	Men: (Slovenia) Tadej Pogačar ( (United Arab Emirates) UAE Team Emirates); Women: (Netherlands) Demi Vollering ( (Netherlands) SD Worx)
20–23	Golf	(United States) 2023 Chevron Championship	International	(United States) Lilia Vu
20–23	Rallying	2023 Croatia Rally (WRC #4)	International	WRC: (United Kingdom) Elfyn Evans & (United Kingdom) Scott Martin ( (Japan) Toyota Gazoo Racing WRT); WRC-2: (France) Yohan Rossel & (France) Arnaud Dunand; WRC-3: (Republic of Ireland) William Creighton & (Republic of Ireland) Liam Regan
20–30	Ice hockey	(Switzerland) 2023 IIHF World U18 Championships	International	United States
21–29	Curling	(South Korea) 2023 World Mixed Doubles Curling Championship (South Korea) 2023 World Senior Curling Championships	International	Mixed: United States; Senior Men: Canada; Senior Women: Canada
22–23	Formula racing	(Germany) 2023 Berlin ePrix (FE #7 & #8)	International	Race 1: (New Zealand) Mitch Evans ( (United Kingdom) Jaguar TCS Racing); Race 2: (New Zealand) Nick Cassidy ( (United Kingdom) Envision Racing)
22–23	Motorcycle racing	2023 WSBK Netherlands round	International	R1: (Spain) Álvaro Bautista ( (Italy) Aruba.it Racing – Ducati); SR: (Spain) Álvaro Bautista ( (Italy) Aruba.it Racing – Ducati); R2: (Spain) Álvaro Bautista ( (Italy) Aruba.it Racing – Ducati)
23	Marathon	(United Kingdom) 2023 London Marathon	International	Men: (Kenya) Kelvin Kiptum; Women: (Netherlands) Sifan Hassan
23	Road bicycle racing	(Belgium) 2023 Liège–Bastogne–Liège (UCI World Tour #19)	International	Men: (Belgium) Remco Evenepoel ( (Belgium) Soudal–Quick-Step); Women: (Netherlands) Demi Vollering ( (Netherlands) SD Worx)
24	Association football	(Switzerland) 2023 UEFA Youth League Final	Continental	(Netherlands) AZ
25–30	Badminton	(United Arab Emirates) 2023 Badminton Asia Championships	Continental	Men: (Indonesia) Anthony Sinisuka Ginting; Women: (Chinese Taipei) Tai Tzu-ying
25–30	Handball	(Bulgaria) 2023 IHF Emerging Nations Championship	International	Cuba
25–30	Road bicycle racing	(Switzerland) 2023 Tour de Romandie (UCI World Tour #20)	International	(United Kingdom) Adam Yates ( (United Arab Emirates) UAE Team Emirates)
25 – 2 May	Volleyball	(Vietnam) 2023 Asian Women's Club Volleyball Championship	Continental	(Vietnam) Sport Center 1
26 – 7 May	Tennis	(Spain) 2023 Madrid Open	International	Men: (Spain) Carlos Alcaraz; Women: Aryna Sabalenka
27–29	American football	(United States) 2023 NFL draft	Domestic	#1 pick: (Alabama) Bryce Young
27–30	Athletics	(Uzbekistan) 2023 Asian U18 Athletics Championships	Continental	China
27–30	Badminton	(Jamaica) 2023 Pan Am Badminton Championships (Individual)	Continental	Men: (Canada) Brian Yang; Women: (Canada) Michelle Li
28–30	Canoe slalom	(Brazil) 2023 Pan American Canoe Slalom Championships	Continental	Brazil
29	Endurance racing	(Belgium) 2023 6 Hours of Spa-Francorchamps (WEC #3)	International	Hypercar: (United Kingdom) Mike Conway, (Japan) Kamui Kobayashi & (Argentina) José María López ( (Japan) Toyota Gazoo Racing); LMP2: (Angola) Rui Andrade, (Switzerland) Louis Delétraz & (Poland) Robert Kubica ( (Belgium) Team WRT); LMGTE-Am: (Argentina) Luis Pérez Companc, (Italy) Alessio Rovera & (France) Lilou Wadoux ( (Italy) Richard Mille AF Corse)
29 – 3 May	Athletics	(Zambia) 2023 African U18 and U20 Championships in Athletics	Continental	South Africa
29 – 4 May	Baseball	(Thailand) 2023 East Asian Baseball Cup	Continental	Philippines
29 – 6 May	Association football	(Saudi Arabia) / (Japan) 2023 AFC Champions League Final	Continental	(Japan) Urawa Red Diamonds
29 – 7 May	Triathlon	(Spain) 2023 World Triathlon Multisport Championships	International	Spain
29 – 14 May	Amateur boxing	(Uzbekistan) 2023 IBA Men's World Boxing Championships	International	Uzbekistan
29 – 19 May	Association football	(Algeria) 2023 U-17 Africa Cup of Nations	Continental	Senegal
30	Formula racing	2023 Azerbaijan Grand Prix (F1 #4)	International	(Mexico) Sergio Pérez ( (Austria) Red Bull Racing-Honda RBPT)
30	Motorcycle racing	(Spain) 2023 Spanish motorcycle Grand Prix (MotoGP #4)	International	MotoGP: (Italy) Francesco Bagnaia ( (Italy) Ducati); Moto2: (United Kingdom) Sam Lowes ( (Belgium) Elf Marc VDS Racing Team); Moto3: (Spain) Iván Ortolá ( (Italy) Angeluss MTA Team)
30 – 7 May	Ice hockey	(Thailand) 2023 IIHF Women's Asia and Oceania Championship	Continental	Thailand

=== May ===
Date	Sport	Venue/Event	Status	Winner/s
1	Road bicycle racing	(Germany) 2023 Eschborn–Frankfurt (UCI World Tour #21)	International	(Denmark) Søren Kragh Andersen ( (Belgium) Alpecin–Deceuninck)
1–7	Road bicycle racing	(Spain) 2023 La Vuelta Femenina	International	(Netherlands) Annemiek van Vleuten ( (Spain) Movistar Team)
3–7	Wrestling	(Argentina) 2023 Pan American Wrestling Championships	Continental	United States
3–7	Wheelchair rugby	(United Kingdom) 2023 IWRF European Championship	Continental	France
3–11	Squash	(United States) 2023 PSA Men's World Squash Championship (United States) 2023 PSA Women's World Squash Championship	International	Men: (Egypt) Ali Farag; Women: (Egypt) Nour El Sherbini
5–7	Futsal	(Spain) 2023 UEFA Futsal Champions League Finals	Continental	(Spain) Palma Futsal
5–13	Weightlifting	(South Korea) 2023 Asian Weightlifting Championships	Continental	China
5–17	Multi-sport	(Cambodia) 2023 SEA Games	Regional	Vietnam
6	Formula racing	2023 Monaco ePrix (FE #9)	International	(New Zealand) Nick Cassidy ( (United Kingdom) Envision Racing)
6	Horse racing	(United States) 2023 Kentucky Derby (US Triple Crown #1)	Domestic	Horse: (United States) Mage; Jockey: (Venezuela) Javier Castellano; Trainer: (Venezuela) Gustavo Delgado
6	Mixed martial arts	(United States) UFC 288: Sterling vs. Cejudo	International	(United States) Aljamain Sterling
6–7	Motorcycle racing	(Spain) 2023 WSBK Catalunya round	International	R1: (Spain) Álvaro Bautista ( (Italy) Aruba.it Racing – Ducati); SR: (Spain) Álvaro Bautista ( (Italy) Aruba.it Racing – Ducati); R2: (Spain) Álvaro Bautista ( (Italy) Aruba.it Racing – Ducati)
6–7	Breaking	(Spain) 2023 WDSF European Breaking Championship	Continental	B-Boys: (Netherlands) Menno Van Gorp; B-Girls: (Lithuania) Dominika Banevič
6–7	Sailing	(United States) 2022–23 SailGP championship	International	Australia
6–28	Road bicycle racing	(Italy) 2023 Giro d'Italia (UCI World Tour #22)	International	(Slovenia) Primož Roglič ( (Netherlands) Team Jumbo–Visma)
7	Formula racing	(United States) 2023 Miami Grand Prix (F1 #5)	International	(Netherlands) Max Verstappen ( (Austria) Red Bull Racing-Honda RBPT)
7–12	Bowls	(Australia) 2023 World Bowls Indoor Championships	International	Men: (Australia) Aron Sherriff; Women: (Scotland) Julie Forrest
7–14	Judo	(Qatar) 2023 World Judo Championships	International	Japan
8–14	Beach soccer	(The Bahamas) 2023 CONCACAF Beach Soccer Championship	Continental	United States
8–14	Golf	(United States) The Tradition	International	(United States) Steve Stricker
10–21	Tennis	(Italy) 2023 Italian Open	International	Men: Daniil Medvedev; Women: (Kazakhstan) Elena Rybakina
11–14	Rallying	2023 Rally de Portugal (WRC #5)	International	WRC: (Finland) Kalle Rovanperä & (Finland) Jonne Halttunen ( (Japan) Toyota Gazoo Racing WRT); WRC-2: (United Kingdom) Gus Greensmith & (Sweden) Jonas Andersson ( (Germany) Toksport WRT 3); WRC-3: (Finland) Roope Korhonen & (Finland) Anssi Viinikka
11–20	Weightlifting	(Tunisia) 2023 African Weightlifting Championships	Continental	Tunisia
12–13	Breaking	(Morocco) 2023 WDSF African Breaking Championship	Continental	B-Boys: (Morocco) Bilal Mallakh; B-Girls: (Morocco) Fatima Zahra El Mamouny
12–14	Basketball	(Spain) 2023 Basketball Champions League Final Four	Continental	(Germany) Telekom Baskets Bonn
12–20	Multi-sport	(South Korea) 2023 Asia Pacific Masters Games	Continental	South Korea
12–28	Ice hockey	(Finland) / (Latvia) 2023 IIHF World Championship	International	Canada
13–14	Athletics	(The Bahamas) 2023 World Athletics Relays	International	Postponed
14	Motorcycle racing	(France) 2023 French motorcycle Grand Prix (Moto GP #5)	International	MotoGP: (Italy) Marco Bezzecchi ( (Italy) Mooney VR46 Racing Team); Moto2: (Italy) Tony Arbolino ( (Belgium) Elf Marc VDS Racing Team); Moto3: (Spain) Daniel Holgado ( (France) Red Bull KTM Tech3)
14–21	Badminton	(China) 2023 Sudirman Cup	International	China
14–21	Volleyball	(Bahrain) 2023 Asian Men's Club Volleyball Championship	Continental	(Japan) Suntory Sunbirds
14–26	Association football	(Estonia) 2023 UEFA Women's Under-17 Championship	Continental	France
16–20	Wrestling	(Tunisia) 2023 African Wrestling Championships	Continental	Egypt
17–21	Rhythmic gymnastics	(Azerbaijan) 2023 Rhythmic Gymnastics European Championships	Continental	Bulgaria
17–28	Nine-pin bowling	(Croatia) 2023 World Team Ninepin Bowling Classic Championships	International	Men: Austria; Women: Croatia
17 – 2 June	Association football	(Hungary) 2023 UEFA European Under-17 Championship	Continental	Germany
18–21	Canoe slalom	(Thailand) 2023 Asian Junior & U23 Canoe Slalom Championships	Continental	Japan
18–21	Golf	(United States) 2023 PGA Championship	International	(United States) Brooks Koepka
19–20	Rhythmic gymnastics	(Mauritius) 2023 African Rhythmic Gymnastics Championships	Continental	Egypt
19–21	Athletics	(Colombia) 2023 South American U20 Championships in Athletics	Continental	Brazil
19–21	Basketball	(Lithuania) 2023 EuroLeague Final Four	Continental	(Spain) Real Madrid
20	Horse racing	(United States) 2023 Preakness Stakes (US Triple Crown #2)	Domestic	Horse: (United States) National Treasure; Jockey: (Puerto Rico) John R. Velazquez; Trainer: (United States) Bob Baffert
20	Rugby union	(Republic of Ireland) 2023 European Rugby Champions Cup Final	Continental	(France) La Rochelle
20	Volleyball	(Italy) 2023 CEV Champions League Final	Continental	(Poland) ZAKSA Kędzierzyn-Koźle
20–21	Rowing	(France) 2023 European Rowing U19 Championships	Continental	Italy
20–28	Table tennis	(South Africa) 2023 World Table Tennis Championships	International	Men: (China) Fan Zhendong; Women: (China) Sun Yingsha
20 – 11 June	Association football	(Argentina) 2023 FIFA U-20 World Cup	International	Uruguay
21	Formula racing	(Italy) 2023 Emilia Romagna Grand Prix	International	Cancelled
21	Racewalking	(Czech Republic) 2023 European Race Walking Team Championships	Continental	Spain
22–28	Golf	(United States) Senior PGA Championship	International	(United States) Steve Stricker
23–28	Rugby union	(Kazakhstan) 2023 Asia Rugby Women's Championship	Continental	Japan
23 – 1 June	Field hockey	(Oman) 2023 Men's Hockey Junior Asia Cup	Continental	India
24 – 4 June	Association football	(Dominican Republic) 2023 CONCACAF Women's U-20 Championship	Continental	Mexico
25–28	Rowing	(Slovenia) 2023 European Rowing Championships	Continental	Great Britain
26–27	Artistic gymnastics	(South Africa) 2023 African Artistic Gymnastics Championships	Continental	Egypt
26–28	Aesthetic group gymnastics	(Finland) 2023 European Aesthetic Group Gymnastics Championships	Continental	Finland
26–29	Artistic gymnastics	(Colombia) 2023 Pan American Artistic Gymnastics Championships	Continental	United States
26–4	Rugby union	(Australia) 2023 Oceania Rugby Women's Championship	Continental	Samoa
27	Association football	(Vanuatu) 2023 OFC Champions League Final	Continental	(New Zealand) Auckland City
27	Basketball	(Rwanda) 2023 BAL Final	Continental	(Egypt) Al Ahly
27–28	Breaking	(Chile) 2023 WDSF Pan American Breaking Championship	Continental	B-Boys: (Canada) Philip Kim; B-Girls: (Colombia) Luisa Fernanda Tejada Pulgarin
28	Formula racing	2023 Monaco Grand Prix (F1 #6)	International	(Netherlands) Max Verstappen ( (Austria) Red Bull Racing-Honda RBPT)
28	Indy car racing	(United States) 2023 Indianapolis 500 (IndyCar #6)	International	(United States) Josef Newgarden ( (United States) Team Penske)
28 – 3 June	Association football	(Tanzania) / (Algeria) 2023 CAF Confederation Cup Final	Continental	(Algeria) USM Alger
28 – 3 June	Multi-sport	(Malta) 2023 Games of the Small States of Europe	Continental	Malta
28 – 4 June	Para ice hockey	(Canada) 2023 World Para Ice Hockey Championships	International	United States
28 – 11 June	Tennis	(France) 2023 French Open	International	Men: (Serbia) Novak Djokovic; Women: (Poland) Iga Świątek
29 – 4 June	Taekwondo	(Azerbaijan) 2023 World Taekwondo Championships	International	South Korea
30 – 3 June	Handball	(Brazil) 2023 South and Central American Men's Club Handball Championship	Continental	(Argentina) San Fernando HB
30 – 4 June	3x3 basketball	(Austria) 2023 FIBA 3x3 World Cup	International	Men: Serbia; Women: United States
30 – 7 June	Surfing	(El Salvador) 2023 ISA World Surfing Games	International	Men: (Mexico) Alan Cleland; Women: (Brazil) Tatiana Weston-Webb
31	Association football	(Hungary) 2023 UEFA Europa League Final	Continental	(Spain) Sevilla
31 – 3 June	Rhythmic gymnastics	(Philippines) 2023 Asian Rhythmic Gymnastics Championships	Continental	Uzbekistan
31 – 3 June	Water polo	(Serbia) 2023 LEN Champions League Final 8	Continental	(Italy) Pro Recco
31 – 4 June	Association football	(Mexico) / (United States) 2023 CONCACAF Champions League Final	Continental	(Mexico) León
31 – 4 June	Modern pentathlon	(Turkey) 2023 Modern Pentathlon World Cup Final	International	Men: (Egypt) Mohanad Shaban; Women: (Italy) Elena Micheli

=== June ===
Date	Sport	Venue/Event	Status	Winner/s
1–4	Brazilian jiu-jitsu	(United States) 2023 World Jiu-Jitsu Championship	International	Brazil
1–4	Rallying	(Italy) 2023 Rally Italia Sardegna (WRC #6)	International	WRC: (Belgium) Thierry Neuville & (Belgium) Martijn Wydaeghe ( (South Korea) Hyundai Shell Mobis WRT); WRC-2: (Norway) Andreas Mikkelsen & (Norway) Torstein Eriksen ( (Germany) Toksport WRT 3); WRC-3: (Finland) Roope Korhonen & (Finland) Anssi Viinikka
1–9	Modern Pentathlon	(Lithuania) 2023 Modern Pentathlon Youth European Championships	Continental	Hungary
1–10	Handball	(Iran) 2023 Asian Men's Club League Handball Championship	Continental	(Bahrain) Al-Najma
1–12	Basketball	(United States) 2023 NBA Finals	Domestic	(Colorado) Denver Nuggets
2–11	Field hockey	(Japan) 2023 Women's Hockey Junior Asia Cup	Continental	India
2–11	Socca	(Germany) 2023 Socca World Cup	International	Kazakhstan
3	Association football	(Netherlands) 2023 UEFA Women's Champions League Final	Continental	(Spain) Barcelona
3	Horse racing	(United Kingdom) 2023 Epsom Derby	International	Horse: (Republic of Ireland) Auguste Rodin; Jockey: (United Kingdom) Ryan Moore; Trainer: (Republic of Ireland) Aidan O'Brien
3–4	Formula racing	(Indonesia) 2023 Jakarta ePrix (FE #10 & #11)	International	Race 1: (Germany) Pascal Wehrlein ( (Germany) TAG Heuer Porsche Formula E Team); Race 2: (Germany) Maximilian Günther ( (Monaco) Maserati MSG Racing)
3–4	Handball	(Hungary) 2023 Women's EHF Champions League Final Four	Continental	(Norway) Vipers Kristiansand
3–4	Motorcycle racing	(Italy) 2023 WSBK Emilia Romagna round	International	R1: (Spain) Álvaro Bautista ( (Italy) Aruba.it Racing – Ducati); SR: (Spain) Álvaro Bautista ( (Italy) Aruba.it Racing – Ducati); R2: (Spain) Álvaro Bautista ( (Italy) Aruba.it Racing – Ducati)
3–9	Multi-sport	(Cambodia) 2023 ASEAN Para Games	Regional	Indonesia
3–17	Rugby union	(Hong Kong) / (Malaysia) 2023 Asia Rugby Championship	Continental	Hong Kong
3–13	Ice hockey	(United States) 2023 Stanley Cup Final	Domestic	(Nevada) Vegas Golden Knights
4	Formula racing	(Spain) 2023 Spanish Grand Prix (F1 #7)	International	(Netherlands) Max Verstappen ( (Austria) Red Bull Racing-Honda RBPT)
4–7	Athletics	(South Korea) 2023 Asian U20 Athletics Championships	Continental	Japan
4–11	Association football	(Egypt) / (Morocco) 2023 CAF Champions League Final	Continental	(Egypt) Al Ahly
4–11	Road bicycle racing	(France) 2023 Critérium du Dauphiné (UCI World Tour #22)	International	(Denmark) Jonas Vingegaard ( (Netherlands) Team Jumbo–Visma)
5–11	Handball	(Greenland) 2023 Nor.Ca. Women's Handball Championship	Continental	Greenland
5–11	Table tennis	(Peru) 2023 South American Table Tennis Championships	Continental	Chile
6–10	Handball	(Brazil) 2023 South and Central American Women's Club Handball Championship	Continental	(Brazil) EC Pinheiros
7	Association football	(Czech Republic) 2023 UEFA Europa Conference League Final	Continental	(England) West Ham United
7–10	Mountain running & Trail running	(Austria) 2023 World Mountain and Trail Running Championships	International	France
7–11	Cricket	(England) 2023 ICC World Test Championship Final	International	Australia
7–13	Road bicycle racing	(Thailand) 2023 Asian Road Cycling Championships	Continental	Kazakhstan
8–11	Rhythmic gymnastics	(Mexico) 2023 Pan American Rhythmic Gymnastics Championships	Continental	Brazil
9–20	Wheelchair basketball	(United Arab Emirates) 2022 Wheelchair Basketball World Championships	International	Men: United States; Women: Netherlands
10	Association football	(Turkey) 2023 UEFA Champions League Final	Continental	(England) Manchester City
10	Horse racing	(United States) 2023 Belmont Stakes (US Triple Crown #3)	Domestic	Horse: (United States) Arcangelo; Jockey: (Venezuela) Javier Castellano; Trainer: (United States) Jena Antonucci
10	Mixed martial arts	(Canada) UFC 289: Nunes vs. Aldana	International	(Brazil) Amanda Nunes
10–11	Endurance racing	(France) 2023 24 Hours of Le Mans (WEC #4)	International	Hypercar: (United Kingdom) James Calado, (Italy) Antonio Giovinazzi & (Italy) Alessandro Pier Guidi ( (Italy) Ferrari AF Corse); LMP2: (Spain) Albert Costa, (Switzerland) Fabio Scherer & (Poland) Jakub Śmiechowski ( (Poland) Inter Europol Competition); LMGTE-Am: (Netherlands) Nicky Catsburg, (United States) Ben Keating & (Argentina) Nicolás Varrone ( (United States) Corvette Racing)
10–17	Water polo	(Romania) 2023 FINA Men's Junior Water Polo World Championships	International	Hungary
10–18	Artistic gymnastics	(Singapore) 2023 Asian Artistic Gymnastics Championships	Continental	Japan
11	Motorcycle racing	(Italy) 2023 Italian motorcycle Grand Prix (Moto GP #6)	International	MotoGP: (Italy) Francesco Bagnaia ( (Italy) Ducati Lenovo Team); Moto2: (Spain) Pedro Acosta ( (Finland) Red Bull KTM Ajo); Moto3: (Spain) Daniel Holgado ( (France) Red Bull KTM Tech3)
11–18	Road bicycle racing	(Switzerland) 2023 Tour de Suisse (UCI World Tour #23)	International	(Denmark) Mattias Skjelmose ( (United States) Trek–Segafredo)
11–18	Powerlifting	(Malta) 2023 IPF World Classic Open Powerlifting Championships	International	United States
12–18	Wrestling	(Albania) 2023 European Cadets Wrestling Championships	Continental	Georgia
13–24	Deaf basketball	(Greece) 2023 DIBF Basketball World Championships	International	Men: United States; Women: United States
14–18	Association football	(Netherlands) 2023 UEFA Nations League Finals	Continental	Spain
14–18	Modern pentathlon	(Turkey) 2023 European Junior Modern Pentathlon Championships	Continental	France
14–18	Track cycling	(Argentina) 2023 Pan American Track Cycling Championships	Continental	Canada
14–19	Track cycling	(Malaysia) 2023 Asian Track Cycling Championships	Continental	Japan
15–18	Association football	(United States) 2023 CONCACAF Nations League Finals	Continental	United States
15–18	Darts	(Germany) 2023 PDC World Cup of Darts	International	Wales
15–18	Golf	(United States) 2023 U.S. Open	International	(United States) Wyndham Clark
15–25	Basketball	(Israel) / (Slovenia) EuroBasket Women 2023	Continental	Belgium
15 – 2 July	Association football	(Thailand) 2023 AFC U-17 Asian Cup	Continental	Japan
17–18	Handball	(Germany) 2023 EHF Champions League Final Four	Continental	(Germany) SC Magdeburg
17–18	Rugby sevens	(Uruguay) 2023 Sudamérica Rugby Men's Sevens (Uruguay) 2023 Sudamérica Rugby Women's Sevens	Continental	Men: Uruguay; Women: Brazil
17–22	Fencing	(China) 2023 Asian Fencing Championships	Continental	Japan
17–25	Multi-sport	(Germany) 2023 Special Olympics World Summer Games	International	India
18	Formula racing	(Canada) 2023 Canadian Grand Prix (F1 #8)	International	(Netherlands) Max Verstappen ( (Austria) Red Bull Racing-Honda RBPT)
18	Motorcycle racing	(Germany) 2023 German motorcycle Grand Prix (Moto GP #7)	International	MotoGP: (Spain) Jorge Martín ( (Italy) Prima Pramac Racing); Moto2: (Spain) Pedro Acosta ( (Finland) Red Bull KTM Ajo); Moto3: (Turkey) Deniz Öncü ( (Finland) Red Bull KTM Ajo)
18–25	Beach soccer	(Chile) 2022 Copa Libertadores de Beach Soccer	Continental	(Paraguay) Club Presidente Hayes
18–25	Volleyball	(Indonesia) 2023 Asian Women's Volleyball Challenge Cup	Continental	Vietnam
19–24	Finswimming	(Egypt) 2023 Finswimming World Junior Championship	International	CMAS
20–25	Squash	(Egypt) 2023 Men's PSA World Tour Finals (Egypt) 2023 Women's PSA World Tour Finals	International	Men: (Egypt) Mostafa Asal; Women: (Egypt) Nouran Gohar
20 – 2 July	Handball	(Germany) / (Greece) 2023 Men's Junior World Handball Championship	International	Germany
21 – 1 July	Lacrosse	(United States) 2023 World Lacrosse Championship	International	United States
21 – 2 July	Multi-sport	(Poland) 2023 European Games	Continental	Italy
21 – 4 July	Association football	(India) 2023 SAFF Championship	Regional	India
21 – 8 July	Association football	(Fiji) 2023 OFC U-19 Women's Championship	Continental	New Zealand
21 – 8 July	Association football	(Romania) / (Georgia (country)) 2023 UEFA European Under-21 Championship	Continental	England
22	Basketball	(United States) 2023 NBA draft	Domestic	(France) Victor Wembanyama
22–25	Golf	(United States) 2023 Women's PGA Championship	International	(China) Yin Ruoning
22–25	Judo	(Portugal) 2023 European Cadet Judo Championships	Continental	Azerbaijan
22–25	Rallying	(Kenya) 2023 Safari Rally (WRC #7)	International	WRC: (France) Sébastien Ogier & (France) Vincent Landais ( (Japan) Toyota Gazoo Racing WRT); WRC-2: (Poland) Kajetan Kajetanowicz & (Poland) Maciej Szczepaniak; WRC-3: (Paraguay) Diego Dominguez Jr. & (Spain) Rogelio Peñate
23–24	Athletics	(Northern Mariana Islands) 2023 Oceania Athletics Cup	Continental	Melanesia
23–25	Athletics	(Poland) 2023 European Athletics Team Championships	Continental	Italy
23–25	Water polo	(United States) 2023 FINA Women's Water Polo World Cup Super Final	International	United States
23–25	Wrestling	(Mexico) 2023 Pan American Cadets Wrestling Championships	Continental	United States
23 – 8 July	Multi-sport	(El Salvador) 2023 Central American and Caribbean Games	Regional	Mexico
24	Formula racing	(United States) 2023 Portland ePrix (FE #12)	International	(New Zealand) Nick Cassidy ( (United Kingdom) Envision Racing)
24–30	Multi-sport	(Tunisia) 2023 African Beach Games	Continental	Algeria
24 – 2 July	Basketball	(Hungary) 2023 FIBA Under-19 Basketball World Cup	International	Spain
24 – 8 July	Association football	(Morocco) 2023 U-23 Africa Cup of Nations	Continental	Morocco
24 – 14 July	Rugby union	(South Africa) 2023 World Rugby U20 Championship	International	France
24 – 16 July	Association football	(United States) 2023 CONCACAF Gold Cup	Continental	Mexico
25	Motorcycle racing	(Netherlands) 2023 Dutch TT (Moto GP #8)	International	MotoGP: (Italy) Francesco Bagnaia ( (Italy) Ducati Lenovo Team); Moto2: (United Kingdom) Jake Dixon ( (Spain) Inde GasGas Aspar Team); Moto3: (Spain) Jaume Masià ( (Luxembourg) Leopard Racing)
25 – 2 July	Golf	(United States) U.S. Senior Open	International	(Germany) Bernhard Langer
26 – 2 July	Basketball	(Australia) 2023 FIBA Women's Asia Cup	Continental	China
26 – 2 July	Wrestling	(Spain) 2023 European Juniors Wrestling Championships	Continental	Ukraine
26 – 9 July	Multi-sport	(Finland) 2023 European Masters Games	Continental	
27 – 2 July	Nine-ball pool	(Spain) 2023 World Cup of Pool	International	Philippines
28–29	Ice hockey	(United States) 2023 NHL entry draft	Domestic	(Canada) Connor Bedard
29 – 2 July	Wheelchair rugby	(Japan) 2023 IWRF Asia-Oceania Championship	Continental	Japan
30 – 2 July	Water polo	(United States) 2023 FINA Men's Water Polo World Cup Super Final	International	Spain
30 – 9 July	Handball	(Hong Kong) 2023 Asian Women's Junior Handball Championship	Continental	South Korea
30 – 9 July	Road bicycle racing	(Italy) 2023 Giro Donne	International	(Netherlands) Annemiek van Vleuten ( (Spain) Movistar Team)

=== July ===
Date	Sport	Venue/Event	Status	Winner/s
1	Judo	(Poland) 2023 European Mixed Team Judo Championships	Continental	Georgia
1–2	Motorcycle racing	(United Kingdom) 2023 WSBK UK round	International	R1: (Spain) Álvaro Bautista ( (Italy) Aruba.it Racing – Ducati); SR: (Spain) Álvaro Bautista ( (Italy) Aruba.it Racing – Ducati); R2: (Turkey) Toprak Razgatlıoğlu ( (Japan) Pata Yamaha Prometeon WorldSBK)
1–9	Archery	(Republic of Ireland) 2023 World Archery Youth Championships	International	South Korea
1–9	Basketball	(Mexico) 2023 FIBA Women's AmeriCup	Continental	Brazil
1–9	Basketball	(Turkey) 2023 FIBA U18 Women's European Championship	Continental	Slovenia
1–16	Association football	(Chile) 2023 U-20 Copa Libertadores	Continental	(Argentina) Boca Juniors
1–23	Road bicycle racing	2023 Tour de France (UCI World Tour #24)	International	(Denmark) Jonas Vingegaard ( (Netherlands) Team Jumbo–Visma)
2	Formula racing	(Austria) 2023 Austrian Grand Prix (F1 #9)	International	(Netherlands) Max Verstappen ( (Austria) Red Bull Racing-Honda RBPT)
2–10	Weightlifting	(Moldova) 2023 European Youth & U15 Weightlifting Championships	Continental	Turkey
3–16	Association football	(Malta) 2023 UEFA European Under-19 Championship	Continental	Italy
3–16	Tennis	(United Kingdom) 2023 Wimbledon Championships	International	Men: (Spain) Carlos Alcaraz; Women: (Czech Republic) Markéta Vondroušová
4–9	Swimming	(Serbia) 2023 European Junior Swimming Championships	Continental	Italy
5–15	Association football	(Indonesia) 2023 AFF U-19 Women's Championship	Regional	Thailand
5–15	Multi-sport	(Algeria) 2023 Arab Games	International	Algeria
5–25	Chess	(China) Women's World Chess Championship 2023	International	(China) Ju Wenjun
6–9	Canoe sprint	(Italy) 2023 World Junior and U23 Canoe Sprint Championships	International	Hungary
6–9	Golf	(United States) 2023 U.S. Women's Open	International	(United States) Allisen Corpuz
6–9	Rhythmic gymnastics	(Romania) 2023 Junior World Rhythmic Gymnastics Championships	International	Bulgaria
7–9	Wrestling	(Chile) 2023 Pan American U20 Wrestling Championships	Continental	United States
7–16	Badminton	(Indonesia) 2023 Badminton Asia Junior Championships	Continental	China
7–16	Volleyball	(Bahrain) 2023 FIVB Volleyball Men's U21 World Championship	International	Iran
8	Mixed martial arts	(United States) UFC 290: Volkanovski vs. Rodríguez	International	(Australia) Alexander Volkanovski
8–14	Multi-sport	(Guernsey) 2023 Island Games	International	Guernsey
8–15	Volleyball	(Taiwan) 2023 Asian Men's Volleyball Challenge Cup	Continental	Thailand
8–16	Basketball	(Angola) 2023 FIBA AfroCan	Continental	Morocco
8–16	Basketball	(Greece) 2023 FIBA U20 European Championship	Continental	France
8–17	Para-athletics	(France) 2023 World Para Athletics Championships	International	China
8–29	Rugby union	(Argentina) / (Australia) / (New Zealand) / (South Africa) 2023 Rugby Championship	International	New Zealand
9	Endurance racing	(Italy) 2023 6 Hours of Monza (WEC #5)	International	Hypercar: (United Kingdom) Mike Conway, (Japan) Kamui Kobayashi, (Argentina) José María López ( (Japan) Toyota Gazoo Racing); LMP2: (Brazil) Pietro Fittipaldi, (Denmark) David Heinemeier Hansson, (Denmark) Oliver Rasmussen ( (United Kingdom) Jota); LMGTE Am: (Germany) Christian Ried, (Denmark) Mikkel Pedersen, (France) Julien Andlauer ( (Germany) Dempsey – Proton Competition)
9	Formula racing	(United Kingdom) 2023 British Grand Prix (F1 #10)	International	(Netherlands) Max Verstappen ( (Austria) Red Bull Racing-Honda RBPT)
10–16	Basketball	(Jordan) 2023 FIBA Under-16 Women's Asian Championship	Continental	Australia
11	Baseball	(United States) 2023 Major League Baseball All-Star Game	Domestic	National League
11–16	Orienteering	(Switzerland) 2023 World Orienteering Championships	International	Switzerland
11–16	Track cycling	(Portugal) 2023 UEC European Track Championships (under-23 & junior)	Continental	Italy
11–16	Volleyball	(Cuba) 2023 Men's U23 Pan-American Volleyball Cup	Continental	Cuba
11–23	Volleyball	(Serbia) / (Hungary) 2023 Women's U17 European Volleyball Championship	Continental	Italy
12–16	Athletics	(Thailand) 2023 Asian Athletics Championships	Continental	Japan
12–16	Volleyball	(United States) 2023 FIVB Volleyball Women's Nations League Final Round	International	Turkey
13–15	Rowing	(Canada) 2023 World University Rowing Championships	International	Cancelled
13–16	Athletics	(Finland) 2023 European Athletics U23 Championships	Continental	Great Britain
13–16	Golf	(United States) Senior Players Championship	International	(United States) Steve Stricker
13–16	Triathlon	(Germany) 2023 World Triathlon Sprint Championships	International	France
13–23	Basketball	(Tunisia) 2023 FIBA Under-16 African Championship (Tunisia) 2023 FIBA U16 Women's African Championship	Continental	Men: Guinea; Women: Mali
14–21	Multi-sport	(Colombia) 2023 South American Beach Games	Continental	Colombia
14–23	Table tennis	(Poland) 2023 European Youth Table Tennis Championships	Continental	Romania
14–28	Shooting	(South Korea) 2023 ISSF Junior World Championships	International	China
14–30	Aquatics	(Japan) 2023 World Aquatics Championships	International	China
15–16	Formula racing	(Italy) 2023 Rome ePrix (FE #13 & #14)	International	Race 1: (New Zealand) Mitch Evans ( (United Kingdom) Jaguar TCS Racing); Race 2: (United Kingdom) Jake Dennis ( (United States) Avalanche Andretti Formula E)
15–16	Motorcycle racing	(Italy) 2023 WSBK Italian round	International	R1: (Spain) Álvaro Bautista ( (Italy) Aruba.it Racing – Ducati); SR: (Turkey) Toprak Razgatlıoğlu ( (Japan) Pata Yamaha Prometeon WorldSBK); R2: (Turkey) Toprak Razgatlıoğlu ( (Japan) Pata Yamaha Prometeon WorldSBK)
15–23	Basketball	(Spain) 2023 FIBA Under-19 Women's Basketball World Cup	International	United States
15–23	Darts	(England) 2023 World Matchplay	International	Nathan Aspinall
15–24	Handball	(India) 2023 Asian Women's Youth Handball Championship	Continental	Japan
15–30	Rugby union	(Kenya) 2023 World Rugby U20 Trophy	International	Spain
17–23	Archery	(Czech Republic) 2023 World Para Archery Championships	International	China
17–23	Finswimming	(Hungary) 2023 European Finswimming Championships	Continental	Hungary
18–23	Baseball	(Slovakia) 2023 U-15 Baseball European Championship	Continental	Netherlands
18–23	Volleyball	(Mexico) 2023 Women's U23 Pan-American Volleyball Cup	Continental	Dominican Republic
18–30	Association football	(Belgium) 2023 UEFA Women's Under-19 Championship	Continental	Spain
19	Association football	(Spain) 2023 UEFA–CONMEBOL Club Challenge	International	(Spain) Sevilla
19–23	Rowing	(Bulgaria) 2023 World Rowing U23 Championships	International	Italy
19–23	Tennis	(France) 2023 Hopman Cup	International	Croatia
19–23	Volleyball	(Poland) 2023 FIVB Volleyball Men's Nations League Final Round	International	Poland
20–23	Canoe slalom	(Slovakia) 2023 European Junior and U23 Canoe Slalom Championships	Continental	Czech Republic
20–23	Golf	(United Kingdom) 2023 Open Championship	International	(United States) Brian Harman
20–23	Rallying	2023 Rally Estonia (WRC #8)	International	WRC: (Finland) Kalle Rovanperä & (Finland) Jonne Halttunen ( (Japan) Toyota Gazoo Racing WRT); WRC-2: (Norway) Andreas Mikkelsen & (Norway) Torstein Eriksen ( (Germany) Toksport WRT 3); WRC-3: (Finland) Roope Korhonen & (Finland) Anssi Viinikka ( (Finland) Rautio Motorsport)
20 – 20 August	Association football	(Australia) / (New Zealand) 2023 FIFA Women's World Cup	International	Spain
21–23	Athletics	(Costa Rica) 2023 NACAC U18 and U23 Championships in Athletics	Continental	United States
21–23	Karate	(Malaysia) 2023 Asian Karate Championships	Continental	Kazakhstan
22–29	Volleyball	(Uzbekistan) 2023 Asian Boys' U16 Volleyball Championship	Continental	Iran
22–30	Basketball	(Serbia) 2023 FIBA U18 European Championship	Continental	Serbia
22–30	Fencing	(Italy) 2023 World Fencing Championships	International	Italy
23	Darts	(England) 2023 Women's World Matchplay	International	Beau Greaves
23	Formula racing	(Hungary) 2023 Hungarian Grand Prix (F1 #11)	International	(Netherlands) Max Verstappen ( (Austria) Red Bull Racing-Honda RBPT)
23–29	Multi-sport	(Slovenia) 2023 European Youth Summer Olympic Festival	Continental	Italy
23–30	Road bicycle racing	2023 Tour de France Femmes	International	(Netherlands) Demi Vollering ( (Netherlands) SD Worx)
25–29	Speedway	(Poland) 2023 Speedway World Cup	International	Poland
26–29	Beach volleyball	(Romania) 2023 European U22 Beach Volleyball Championships	Continental	Men: (Norway) Markus Mol & (Norway) Jo Sunde; Women: (Lithuania) Danielė Kvedaraitė & (Lithuania) Ariana Rudkovskaja
27–30	Canoe sprint	(Portugal) 2023 European Junior and U23 Canoe Sprint Championships	Continental	Hungary
27–30	Golf	(France) 2023 Evian Championship	International	(France) Céline Boutier
27–30	Golf	(United Kingdom) 2023 Senior Open Championship	International	(Germany) Alex Cejka
27–30	Volleyball	(Qatar) 2023 FIVB Volleyball Men's Challenger Cup (France) 2023 FIVB Volleyball Women's Challenger Cup	International	Men: Turkey; Women: France
28–30	Athletics	(Brazil) 2023 South American Championships in Athletics	Continental	Brazil
28 – 5 August	Basketball	(Rwanda) 2023 Women's Afrobasket	Continental	Nigeria
28 – 6 August	Baseball	(Taiwan) 2023 U-12 Baseball World Cup	International	United States
28 – 6 August	Multi-sport	(Democratic Republic of the Congo) 2023 Jeux de la Francophonie	International	Morocco
28 – 6 August	Multi-sport	(Canada) 2023 World Police and Fire Games	International	United States
28 – 6 August	Netball	(South Africa) 2023 Netball World Cup	International	Australia
28 – 8 August	Multi-sport	(China) 2021 Summer World University Games	International	China
29–30	Formula racing	(United Kingdom) 2023 London ePrix (FE #15 & #16)	International	Race 1: (New Zealand) Mitch Evans ( (United Kingdom) Jaguar TCS Racing); Race 2: (New Zealand) Nick Cassidy ( (United Kingdom) Envision Racing)
29	Road bicycle racing	(Spain) 2023 Clásica de San Sebastián (UCI World Tour #25)	International	(Belgium) Remco Evenepoel ( (Belgium) Soudal–Quick-Step)
29	Mixed martial arts	(United States) UFC 291: Poirier vs. Gaethje 2	International	(United States) Justin Gaethje
29–30	Motorcycle racing	(Czech Republic) 2023 WSBK Czech round	International	R1: (United Kingdom) Jonathan Rea ( (Japan) Kawasaki Racing Team WorldSBK); SR: (Turkey) Toprak Razgatlıoğlu ( (Japan) Pata Yamaha Prometeon WorldSBK); R2: (Spain) Álvaro Bautista ( (Italy) Aruba.it Racing – Ducati)
29 – 4 August	Road bicycle racing	(Poland) 2023 Tour de Pologne (UCI World Tour #26)	International	(Slovenia) Matej Mohorič ( Team Bahrain Victorious)
29 – 6 August	Basketball	(Lithuania) 2023 FIBA U20 Women's European Championship	Continental	France
30	Formula racing	(Belgium) 2023 Belgian Grand Prix (F1 #12)	International	(Netherlands) Max Verstappen ( (Austria) Red Bull Racing-Honda RBPT)
30 — 24 August	Chess	(Azerbaijan) Chess World Cup 2023 (Azerbaijan) Women's Chess World Cup 2023	International	Men: (Norway) Magnus Carlsen; Women: (FIDE) Aleksandra Goryachkina
31 – 6 August	Archery	(Germany) 2023 World Archery Championships	International	India
31 – 6 August	Para swimming	(United Kingdom) 2023 World Para Swimming Championships	International	Italy
31 – 6 August	Wrestling	(Turkey) 2023 World Cadet Wrestling Championships	International	Japan

=== August ===
Date	Sport	Venue/Event	Status	Winner/s
1–11	Volleyball	(Croatia) / (Hungary) 2023 FIVB Volleyball Girls' U19 World Championship	International	United States
1–12	Climbing	(Switzerland) 2023 IFSC Climbing World Championships	International	Austria and Slovenia
2–6	Beach volleyball	(Austria) 2023 European Beach Volleyball Championships	Continental	Men: (Sweden) David Åhman/Jonatan Hellvig; Women: (Switzerland) Nina Brunner/Tanja Hüberli
2–6	Rowing	(France) 2023 World Rowing Junior Championships	International	Great Britain
2–11	Volleyball	(Argentina) 2023 FIVB Volleyball Boys' U19 World Championship	International	France
2–13	Handball	(Croatia) 2023 Men's Youth World Handball Championship	International	Spain
3–6	Rallying	2023 Rally Finland (WRC #9)	International	WRC: (United Kingdom) Elfyn Evans & (United Kingdom) Scott Martin ( (Japan) Toyota Gazoo Racing WRT); WRC-2: (Finland) Sami Pajari & (Finland) Enni Mälkönen ( (Germany) Toksport WRT 2); WRC-3: (Finland) Benjamin Korhola & (Finland) Pekka Kelander ( (Finland) Rautio Motorsport)
3–12	Field hockey	(India) 2023 Men's Asian Champions Trophy	Continental	India
3–13	Cycling	(United Kingdom) 2023 UCI Cycling World Championships	International	Great Britain
4–6	Athletics	(Puerto Rico) 2023 Pan American U20 Athletics Championships	Continental	United States
4–6	Judo	(Hungary) 2023 Judo World Masters	International	Japan
4–11	Multi-sport	(Trinidad and Tobago) 2023 Commonwealth Youth Games	International	Australia
4–12	Badminton	(Lithuania) 2023 European U17 Badminton Championships	Continental	France
5–12	Multi-sport	(Indonesia) 2023 World Beach Games	International	Cancelled
5–13	Basketball	(North Macedonia) 2023 FIBA U16 European Championship	Continental	Spain
6	Motorcycle racing	(United Kingdom) 2023 British motorcycle Grand Prix (Moto GP #9)	International	MotoGP: (Spain) Aleix Espargaró ( (Italy) Aprilia Racing); Moto2: (Spain) Fermín Aldeguer ( (Italy) Speed Up Racing); Moto3: (Colombia) David Alonso ( (Spain) GasGas Aspar Team)
6–13	Beach soccer	(Chile) 2023 South American Under-20 Beach Soccer Championship	Continental	Paraguay
6–13	Volleyball	(Puerto Rico) 2023 Women's Pan-American Volleyball Cup	Continental	Argentina
7–10	Athletics	(Israel) 2023 European Athletics U20 Championships	Continental	Germany
7–13	Tennis	(Canada) 2023 Canadian Open	International	Men: (Italy) Jannik Sinner; Women: (United States) Jessica Pegula
8–20	Multi-sport	(Netherlands) 2023 European Para Championships	Continental	France
10–13	Field hockey	(New Zealand) 2023 Men's Oceania Cup (New Zealand) 2023 Women's Oceania Cup	Continental	Men: Australia; Women: Australia
10–13	Golf	(United Kingdom) 2023 Women's British Open	International	(United States) Lilia Vu
10–20	Sailing	(Netherlands) 2023 Sailing World Championships	International	Netherlands
10–27	Golf	(United States) 2023 FedEx Cup Playoffs	International	St. Jude Championship: (United States) Lucas Glover; BMW Championship: (Norway) Viktor Hovland; Tour Championship: (Norway) Viktor Hovland
11–13	Swimming	(Republic of Ireland) 2023 European U-23 Swimming Championships	Continental	Ireland
11–19	Basketball	(Turkey) 2023 FIBA U16 Women's European Championship	Continental	France
13–20	Tennis	(United States) 2023 Cincinnati Masters	International	Men: (Serbia) Novak Djokovic; Women: (United States) Coco Gauff
14–20	Wrestling	(Jordan) 2023 World Junior Wrestling Championships	International	Iran
14 – 3 September	Shooting	(Azerbaijan) 2023 ISSF World Shooting Championships	International	China
15–20	Canoe slalom	(Poland) 2023 World Junior and U23 Canoe Slalom Championships	International	Czech Republic
15–20	Volleyball	(Mexico) 2023 Men's Pan-American Volleyball Cup	Continental	Canada
15 – 3 September	Volleyball	(Belgium) / (Germany) / (Italy) / (Estonia) 2023 Women's European Volleyball Championship	Continental	Turkey
16	Association football	(Greece) 2023 UEFA Super Cup	Continental	(England) Manchester City
16–23	Multi-sport	(Mongolia) 2023 East Asian Youth Games	Regional	China
16–24	Volleyball	(Cameroon) 2023 Women's African Nations Volleyball Championship	Continental	Kenya
17–20	Beach volleyball	(Latvia) 2023 European U20 Beach Volleyball Championships	Continental	Men: (France) Canet/Rotar; Women: (Poland) Ciezkowska/Lunio
17–26	Association football	(Thailand) 2023 AFF U-23 Championship	Regional	Vietnam
17–26	Volleyball	(Mexico) 2023 FIVB Volleyball Women's U21 World Championship	International	China
17–27	Baseball	(United States) 2023 Little League World Series	Domestic	(California) El Segundo Little League
18–27	Field hockey	(Germany) 2023 Men's EuroHockey Championship (Germany) 2023 Women's EuroHockey Championship	Continental	Men: Netherlands; Women: Netherlands
19	Mixed martial arts	(United States) UFC 292: Sterling vs. O'Malley	International	(United States) Sean O'Malley
19–20	Rugby sevens	(Canada) 2023 RAN Sevens (Canada) 2023 RAN Women's Sevens	Continental	Men: United States; Women: Canada
19–23	Volleyball	(Brazil) 2023 Women's South American Volleyball Championship	Continental	Brazil
19–26	Volleyball	(Iran) 2023 Asian Men's Volleyball Championship	Continental	Japan
19–27	Athletics	(Hungary) 2023 World Athletics Championships	International	United States
19–28	Modern pentathlon	(United Kingdom) 2023 World Modern Pentathlon Championships	International	Egypt
20	Road bicycle racing	(Germany) 2023 Hamburg Cyclassics (UCI World Tour #27)	International	(Denmark) Mads Pedersen ( (United States) Lidl–Trek)
20	Motorcycle racing	(Austria) 2023 Austrian motorcycle Grand Prix (Moto GP #10)	International	MotoGP: (Italy) Francesco Bagnaia ( (Italy) Ducati Lenovo Team); Moto2: (Italy) Celestino Vietti ( (Italy) Fantic Racing); Moto3: (Turkey) Deniz Öncü ( (Finland) Red Bull KTM Ajo)
21–27	Badminton	(Denmark) 2023 BWF World Championships	International	Men: (Thailand) Kunlavut Vitidsarn; Women: (South Korea) An Se-young
21–27	Summer biathlon	(Slovakia) 2023 Summer Biathlon World Championships	International	Bulgaria
22–26	Beach soccer	(French Polynesia) 2023 OFC Beach Soccer Nations Cup	Continental	Tahiti
22–30	Paralympic powerlifting	(United Arab Emirates) 2023 World Para Powerlifting Championships	International	China
23–27	Canoe sprint	(Germany) 2023 ICF Canoe Sprint World Championships	International	Germany
23–27	Judo	(Croatia) 2023 World Judo Cadets Championships	International	Azerbaijan
23–27	Rhythmic gymnastics	(Spain) 2023 Rhythmic Gymnastics World Championships	International	Germany
23–27	Road bicycle racing	(Belgium) / (Netherlands) 2023 Renewi Tour (UCI World Tour #28)	International	(Belgium) Tim Wellens ( (United Arab Emirates) UAE Team Emirates)
23–27	Track cycling	(Colombia) 2023 UCI Junior Track Cycling World Championships	International	Italy
23 – 3 September	Multi-sport	(Madagascar) 2023 Indian Ocean Island Games	Regional	Madagascar
24–27	Beach volleyball	(Spain) 2023 European U18 Beach Volleyball Championships	Continental	Men: (Denmark) Napier/Brinck; Women: (Spain) Carro/Izuzquiza
24–27	Golf	(United States) 2023 U.S. Senior Women's Open	International	(England) Trish Johnson
25 – 10 September	Basketball	(Indonesia) / (Japan) / (Philippines) 2023 FIBA Basketball World Cup	International	Germany
26–27	Rowing	(Germany) 2023 European Rowing U23 Championships	Continental	Romania
26–30	Volleyball	(Brazil) 2023 Men's South American Volleyball Championship	Continental	Argentina
26 – 3 September	Inline speed skating	(Italy) 2023 Inline Speed Skating World Championships	International	Colombia
26 – 17 September	Road bicycle racing	(Spain) 2023 Vuelta a España (UCI World Tour #29)	International	(United States) Sepp Kuss ( (Netherlands) Team Jumbo–Visma)
27	Formula racing	(Netherlands) 2023 Dutch Grand Prix (F1 #13)	International	(Netherlands) Max Verstappen ( (Austria) Red Bull Racing-Honda RBPT)
27 – 3 September	Sailing	(Lithuania) 2023 470 Junior World Championships	International	France
28 – 10 September	Tennis	(United States) 2023 US Open	International	Men: (Serbia) Novak Djokovic; Women: (United States) Coco Gauff
28 – 16 September	Volleyball	(Italy) / (North Macedonia) / (Bulgaria) / (Israel) 2023 Men's European Volleyball Championship	Continental	Poland
29 – 3 September	Volleyball	(Canada) 2023 Women's NORCECA Volleyball Championship	Continental	Dominican Republic
29 – 10 September	Bowls	(Australia) 2023 World Outdoor Bowls Championship	International	Men: (Canada) Ryan Bester; Women: (New Zealand) Tayla Bruce
30 – 3 September	3x3 basketball	(Hungary) 2023 FIBA 3x3 U18 World Cup	International	Men: Germany; Women: United States
30 – 3 September	Artistic swimming	(Greece) 2023 FINA Youth Artistic Swimming Championships	International	Japan
30 – 6 September	Volleyball	(Thailand) 2023 Asian Women's Volleyball Championship	Continental	Thailand
30 – 17 September	Cricket	(Pakistan) / (Sri Lanka) 2023 Asia Cup	Continental	India

=== September ===
Date	Sport	Venue/Event	Status	Winner/s
3	Formula racing	(Italy) 2023 Italian Grand Prix (F1 #14)	International	(Netherlands) Max Verstappen ( (Austria) Red Bull Racing-Honda RBPT)
3	Motorcycle racing	(Catalonia) 2023 Catalan motorcycle Grand Prix (Moto GP #11)	International	MotoGP: (Spain) Aleix Espargaró ( (Italy) Aprilia Racing); Moto2: (United Kingdom) Jake Dixon ( (Spain) Asterius GasGas Aspar Team); Moto3: (Colombia) David Alonso ( (Italy) Gaviota GasGas Aspar Team)
3	Road bicycle racing	2023 Bretagne Classic Ouest-France (UCI World Tour #30)	International	(France) Valentin Madouas ( (France) Groupama–FDJ)
3–10	Futsal	(Croatia) 2023 UEFA Under-19 Futsal Championship	Continental	Portugal
3–10	Rowing	(Serbia) 2023 World Rowing Championships	International	Netherlands
3–10	Table tennis	(South Korea) 2023 Asian Table Tennis Championships	Continental	Men: (China) Ma Long; Women: (China) Wang Manyu
3–12	Multi-sport	(Ghana) 2023 African Para Games	Continental	Morocco
3–13	Volleyball	(Egypt) 2023 Men's African Nations Volleyball Championship	Continental	Egypt
4–9	Swimming	(Israel) 2023 World Aquatics Junior Swimming Championships	International	United States
4–10	Dressage	(Germany) 2023 FEI European Dressage Championships	Continental	Germany
4–17	Weightlifting	(Saudi Arabia) 2023 World Weightlifting Championships	International	China
5–7	3x3 basketball	(Israel) 2023 FIBA 3x3 Europe Cup	Continental	Men: Serbia; Women: Netherlands
5–10	Volleyball	(United States) 2023 Men's NORCECA Volleyball Championship	Continental	United States
6–11	Modern pentathlon	(Egypt) 2023 African & Oceania Modern Pentathlon Championships	Continental	Men: (Egypt) Ahmed El-Gendy; Women: (Egypt) Malak Ismail
7–10	Judo	(Morocco) 2023 African Judo Championships	Continental	Algeria
7–10	Judo	(Netherlands) 2023 European Junior Judo Championships	Continental	Italy
7–10	Rallying	(Greece) 2023 Acropolis Rally (WRC #10)	International	WRC: (Finland) Kalle Rovanperä & (Finland) Jonne Halttunen ( (Japan) Toyota Gazoo Racing WRT); WRC-2: (Norway) Andreas Mikkelsen & (Norway) Torstein Eriksen ( (Germany) Toksport WRT 3); WRC-3: (Paraguay) Diego Dominguez Jr & (Spain) Rogelio Peñate
7–14	Handball	(Tunisia) 2023 African Women's Junior Handball Championship	Continental	Angola
7 – 7 January 2024	American football	(United States) 2023 NFL season	Domestic	
8–10	Artistic gymnastics	(Colombia) 2023 South American Artistic Gymnastics Championships	Continental	Brazil
8–27	Shooting	(Croatia) 2023 European Shotgun Championships	Continental	Italy
8 – 28 October	Rugby union	(France) 2023 Rugby World Cup	International	South Africa
8	Road bicycle racing	(Canada) 2023 Grand Prix Cycliste de Québec (UCI World Tour #31)	International	(Belgium) Arnaud De Lie ( (Belgium) Lotto–Dstny)
9	Association football	(Argentina) 2023 Under-20 Intercontinental Cup	International	(Argentina) Boca Juniors
9	Surfing	(United States) 2023 World Surf League Finals	International	Men: (Brazil) Filipe Toledo; Women: (United States) Caroline Marks
9–10	Motorcycle racing	(France) 2023 WSBK French round	International	R1: (Turkey) Toprak Razgatlıoğlu ( (Japan) Pata Yamaha Prometeon WorldSBK); SR: (Turkey) Toprak Razgatlıoğlu ( (Japan) Pata Yamaha Prometeon WorldSBK); R2: (Spain) Álvaro Bautista ( (Italy) Aruba.it Racing – Ducati)
9–16	Multi-sport	(Germany) 2023 Invictus Games	International	Ukraine
9–16	Multi-sport	(Greece) 2023 Mediterranean Beach Games	Regional	Italy
9–17	Futsal	(Venezuela) 2022 South American Under-20 Futsal Championship	Continental	Brazil
10	Endurance racing	(Japan) 2023 6 Hours of Fuji (WEC #6)	International	Hypercar: (United Kingdom) Mike Conway, (Japan) Kamui Kobayashi & (Argentina) José María López ( (Japan) Toyota Gazoo Racing); LMP2: (Angola) Rui Andrade, (Switzerland) Louis Delétraz & (Poland) Robert Kubica ( (Belgium) Team WRT); LMGTE Am: (Italy) Francesco Castellacci, (Switzerland) Thomas Flohr & (Italy) Davide Rigon ( (Italy) AF Corse)
10	Mixed martial arts	(Australia) UFC 293: Adesanya vs. Strickland	International	(United States) Sean Strickland
10	Motorcycle racing	2023 San Marino and Rimini Riviera motorcycle Grand Prix (Moto GP #12)	International	MotoGP: (Spain) Jorge Martín ( (Italy) Prima Pramac Racing); Moto2: (Spain) Pedro Acosta ( (Finland) Red Bull KTM Ajo); Moto3: (Colombia) David Alonso ( (Spain) GasGas Aspar Team)
10	Road bicycle racing	(Canada) 2023 Grand Prix Cycliste de Montréal (UCI World Tour #32)	International	(United Kingdom) Adam Yates ( (United Arab Emirates) UAE Team Emirates)
10–17	Table tennis	(Sweden) 2023 European Table Tennis Championships	Continental	Men: Sweden; Women: Germany
10–17	Table tennis	(Cuba) 2023 Pan American Table Tennis Championships	Continental	Men: (Brazil) Hugo Calderano; Women: (United States) Amy Wang
11–17	Badminton	(South Korea) 2023 BWF World Senior Championships	International	England
11–17	Table tennis	(Tunisia) 2023 African Table Tennis Championships	Continental	Men: (Nigeria) Quadri Aruna; Women: (Egypt) Hana Goda
12–17	Modern pentathlon	(Lithuania) 2023 World Junior Modern Pentathlon Championships	International	France
13–26	Association football	(French Polynesia) 2023 OFC U-16 Women's Championship	Continental	New Zealand
15–17	Judo	(Canada) 2023 Pan American-Oceania Judo Championships	Continental	Brazil
16–17	Rugby sevens	(Zimbabwe) 2023 Africa Men's Sevens	Continental	Kenya
16–23	Handball	(Tunisia) 2023 African Women's Youth Handball Championship	Continental	Egypt
16–24	Wrestling	(Serbia) 2023 World Wrestling Championships	International	Japan
17	Formula racing	2023 Singapore Grand Prix (F1 #15)	International	(Spain) Carlos Sainz Jr. ( (Italy) Scuderia Ferrari)
17–21	Real Tennis	(United States) 2023 Real Tennis World Championship	International	(United States) Camden Riviere
17–23	Tennis	(Mexico) 2023 Guadalajara Open	International	(Greece) Maria Sakkari
17–24	Basketball	(Qatar) 2023 FIBA U16 Asian Championship	Continental	Australia
19–24	Beach soccer	(Italy) 2023 Euro Beach Soccer League	Continental	Italy
19–24	Canoe slalom	(United Kingdom) 2023 ICF Canoe Slalom World Championships	International	Great Britain
20–24	Beach soccer	(Italy) 2023 Women's Euro Beach Soccer League	Continental	Spain
20–24	Road bicycle racing	(Netherlands) 2023 European Road Championships	Continental	Great Britain & Italy
21–24	Basketball	(Singapore) 2023 FIBA Intercontinental Cup	International	(Brazil) Sesi Franca
22–24	Breaking	(Belgium) 2023 WDSF World Breaking Championship	International	B-Boys: (United States) Victor Montalvo; B-Girls: (Lithuania) Dominika Banevič
22–24	Golf	(Spain) 2023 Solheim Cup	International	Europe
22–24	Tennis	(Canada) 2023 Laver Cup	International	Team World
23–24	Motorcycle racing	(Spain) 2023 WSBK Aragon round	International	R1: (Italy) Michael Ruben Rinaldi ( (Italy) Aruba.it Racing – Ducati); SR: (Spain) Álvaro Bautista ( (Italy) Aruba.it Racing – Ducati); R2: (Spain) Álvaro Bautista ( (Italy) Aruba.it Racing – Ducati)
23 – 8 October	Multi-sport	(China) 2022 Asian Games	Continental	China
24	American football	(Germany) 2023 European League of Football Championship Game	Regional	(Germany) Rhein Fire
24	Formula racing	(Japan) 2023 Japanese Grand Prix (F1 #16)	International	(Netherlands) Max Verstappen ( (Austria) Red Bull Racing-Honda RBPT)
24	Marathon	(Germany) 2023 Berlin Marathon	International	Men: (Kenya) Eliud Kipchoge; Women: (Ethiopia) Tigst Assefa
24	Motorcycle racing	(India) 2023 Indian motorcycle Grand Prix (Moto GP #13)	International	MotoGP: (Italy) Marco Bezzecchi ( (Italy) Mooney VR46 Racing Team); Moto2: (Spain) Pedro Acosta ( (Finland) Red Bull KTM Ajo); Moto3: (Spain) Jaume Masià ( (Luxembourg) Leopard Racing)
24 – 1 October	SUP & Paddleboarding	(France) 2023 ISA World SUP and Paddleboard Championship	International	France
25 – 8 October	Badminton	(United States) 2023 BWF World Junior Championships	International	China
27 – 1 October	3x3 basketball	(Poland) 2023 FIBA 3x3 Under-23 World Cup	International	Men: United States; Women: Netherlands
28	Basketball	(France) 2023 FIBA Europe SuperCup Women	Continental	(Turkey) Fenerbahçe
28 – 1 October	Rallying	2023 Rally Chile (WRC #11)	International	WRC: (Estonia) Ott Tänak & (Estonia) Martin Järveoja ( (United Kingdom) M-Sport Ford WRT); WRC-2: (Sweden) Oliver Solberg & (United Kingdom) Elliott Edmondson; WRC-3: (Peru) Eduardo Castro & (Argentina) Fernando Mussano
29 – 1 October	Golf	(Italy) 2023 Ryder Cup	International	Europe
30 – 1 October	Road running	(Latvia) 2023 World Athletics Road Running Championships	International	Kenya
30 – 1 October	Motorcycle racing	2023 WSBK Portugal round	International	R1: (Spain) Álvaro Bautista ( (Italy) Aruba.it Racing – Ducati); SR: (Spain) Álvaro Bautista ( (Italy) Aruba.it Racing – Ducati); R2: (Spain) Álvaro Bautista ( (Italy) Aruba.it Racing – Ducati)
30 – 8 October	Artistic gymnastics	(Belgium) 2023 World Artistic Gymnastics Championships	International	United States
30 – 8 October	Tennis	2023 China Open	International	Men: (Italy) Jannik Sinner; Women: (Poland) Iga Świątek

=== October ===
Date	Sport	Venue/Event	Status	Winner/s
1	Horse racing	(France) 2023 Prix de l'Arc de Triomphe	International	Horse: (Republic of Ireland) Ace Impact; Jockey: (Italy) Cristian Demuro; Trainer: (France) Jean-Claude Rouget
1	Motorcycle racing	(Japan) 2023 Japanese motorcycle Grand Prix (Moto GP #15)	International	MotoGP: (Spain) Jorge Martín ( (Italy) Prima Pramac Racing); Moto2: (Thailand) Somkiat Chantra ( (Japan) Idemitsu Honda Team Asia); Moto3: (Spain) Jaume Masià ( (Luxembourg) Leopard Racing)
1–7	Futsal	(New Zealand) 2023 OFC Futsal Nations Cup	Continental	New Zealand
2–8	Darts	(England) 2023 World Grand Prix	International	(England) Luke Humphries
4–8	Judo	(Portugal) 2023 World Judo Juniors Championships	International	Japan
4–15	Tennis	(China) 2023 Shanghai Masters	International	(Poland) Hubert Hurkacz
5–21	Association football	(Colombia) 2023 Copa Libertadores Femenina	Continental	(Brazil) Corinthians
5–19 November	Cricket	(India) 2023 Cricket World Cup	International	Australia
6–15	Beach volleyball	(Mexico) 2023 Beach Volleyball World Championships	International	Men: (Czech Republic) Ondřej Perušič & David Schweiner; Women: (United States) Kelly Cheng & Sara Hughes
7	Road bicycle racing	(Italy) 2023 Il Lombardia (UCI World Tour #33)	International	(Slovenia) Tadej Pogačar ( (United Arab Emirates) UAE Team Emirates)
7–8	Gravel cycling	(Italy) 2023 UCI Gravel World Championships	International	Men: (Slovenia) Matej Mohorič; Women: (Poland) Katarzyna Niewiadoma
7–8	Motocross	(France) 2023 Motocross des Nations	International	France
8	Formula racing	2023 Qatar Grand Prix (F1 #17)	International	(Netherlands) Max Verstappen ( (Austria) Red Bull Racing-Honda RBPT)
8	Marathon	(United States) 2023 Chicago Marathon	International	Men: (Kenya) Kelvin Kiptum; Women: (Netherlands) Sifan Hassan
12–17	Road bicycle racing	(China) 2023 Tour of Guangxi (UCI World Tour #34)	International	(Netherlands) Milan Vader ( (Netherlands) Team Jumbo–Visma)
13–15	Rhythmic gymnastics	(Colombia) 2023 South American Rhythmic Gymnastics Championships	Continental	Brazil
13 – 4 November	Rugby union	(New Zealand) / (South Africa) / (United Arab Emirates) 2023 WXV	International	WXV 1: England; WXV 2: Scotland; WXV 3: Ireland
14–15	Rugby sevens	(Tunisia) 2023 Africa Women's Sevens	Continental	South Africa
14–21	Curling	(Scotland) 2023 World Mixed Curling Championship	International	Sweden
14 – 4 November	Rugby league	(Australia) / (New Zealand) 2023 Rugby League Pacific Championships	Continental	Cup: New Zealand; Bowl: Papua New Guinea
15	Motorcycle racing	(Indonesia) 2023 Indonesian motorcycle Grand Prix (Moto GP #16)	International	MotoGP: (Italy) Francesco Bagnaia ( (Italy) Ducati Lenovo Team); Moto2: (Spain) Pedro Acosta ( (Finland) Red Bull KTM Ajo); Moto3: (Brazil) Diogo Moreira ( (Spain) MT Helmets – MSi)
17–22	Wrestling	(Greece) 2023 World Veterans Wrestling Championships	International	United States
19–30	Softball	(Japan) 2023 U-15 Women's Softball World Cup	International	United States
20–29	Korfball	(Taiwan) 2023 IKF World Korfball Championship	International	Netherlands
20 – 5 November	Multi-sport	(Chile) 2023 Pan American Games	Continental	United States
21	Mixed martial arts	(United Arab Emirates) UFC 294: Makhachev vs. Volkanovski 2	International	(Russia) Islam Makhachev
21–30	Multi-sport	(Saudi Arabia) 2023 World Combat Games	International	Ukraine
22	Formula racing	2023 United States Grand Prix (F1 #18)	International	(Netherlands) Max Verstappen ( (Austria) Red Bull Racing-Honda RBPT)
22	Motorcycle racing	(Australia) 2023 Australian motorcycle Grand Prix (Moto GP #17)	International	MotoGP: (France) Johann Zarco ( (Italy) Prima Pramac Racing); Moto2: (Italy) Tony Arbolino ( (Belgium) Elf Marc VDS Racing Team); Moto3: (Turkey) Deniz Öncü ( (Finland) Red Bull KTM Ajo)
22–28	Multi-sport	(China) 2022 Asian Para Games	Continental	China
22 – 2 November	Shooting	(South Korea) 2023 Asian Shooting Championships	Continental	China
23–29	Wrestling	(Albania) 2023 U23 World Wrestling Championships	International	Authorised Neutral Athletes
24–29	Karate	(Hungary) 2023 World Karate Championships	International	Japan
24–29	Tennis	(China) 2023 WTA Elite Trophy	International	Singles: (Brazil) Beatriz Haddad Maia; Doubles: (Brazil) Beatriz Haddad Maia & Veronika Kudermetova
25 – 5 November	Chess	(Isle of Man) FIDE Grand Swiss Tournament 2023 (Isle of Man) FIDE Women's Grand Swiss Tournament 2023	International	Men: (India) Vidit Gujrathi; Women: (India) Vaishali Rameshbabu
26–29	Darts	(Germany) 2023 European Championship	International	(Scotland) Peter Wright
26–29	Rallying	(Germany) / (Austria) / (Czech Republic) 2023 Central Europe Rally (WRC #12)	International	WRC: (Belgium) Thierry Neuville & (Belgium) Martijn Wydaeghe ( (South Korea) Hyundai Shell Mobis WRT); WRC-2: (France) Nicolas Ciamin & (France) Yannick Roche; WRC-3: (Czech Republic) Filip Kohn & (United Kingdom) Tom Woodburn
27–29	Canoe slalom	(Japan) 2023 Asian Canoe Slalom Championships	Continental	Japan
27 – 1 November	Baseball	(United States) 2023 World Series	Domestic	Texas Rangers
27 – 5 November	Field hockey	(India) 2023 Women's Asian Champions Trophy	Continental	India
28	Association football	(Uruguay) 2023 Copa Sudamericana final	Continental	(Ecuador) LDU Quito
29	Formula racing	2023 Mexico City Grand Prix (F1 #19)	International	(Netherlands) Max Verstappen ( (Austria) Red Bull Racing-Honda RBPT)
29	Ice hockey	(Canada) 2023 Heritage Classic	Domestic	(Alberta) Edmonton Oilers
29	Motorcycle racing	2023 Thailand motorcycle Grand Prix (Moto GP #18)	International	MotoGP: (Spain) Jorge Martín ( (Italy) Prima Pramac Racing); Moto2: (Spain) Fermín Aldeguer ( (Italy) Beta Tools Speed Up); Moto3: (Colombia) David Alonso ( (Spain) Gaviota GasGas Aspar Team)
29 – 5 November	Tennis	(Mexico) 2023 WTA Finals	International	Singles: (Poland) Iga Świątek; Doubles: (Germany) Laura Siegemund & Vera Zvonareva
30 – 5 November	Tennis	(France) 2023 Paris Masters	International	(Serbia) Novak Djokovic
30 – 6 November	Shooting	(Australia) 2023 Oceania Shooting Championships	Continental	Australia

=== November ===
Date	Sport	Venue/Event	Status	Winner/s
3–4	Horse racing	(United States) 2023 Breeders' Cup	International	Breeders' Cup Classic: Horse: (United States) White Abarrio; Jockey: (Puerto Rico) Irad Ortiz Jr.; Trainer: (United States) Richard Dutrow Jr.
3–5	Judo	(France) 2023 European Judo Championships	Continental	France
3–5	Cyclo-cross	(France) 2023 UEC European Cyclo-cross Championships	Continental	Men: (Belgium) Michael Vanthourenhout; Women: (Netherlands) Fem van Empel
3–10	Archery	(Thailand) 2023 Asian Archery Championships	Continental	South Korea
3–9 December	Basketball	(United States) 2023 NBA In-Season Tournament	Domestic	(California) Los Angeles Lakers
4	Association football	(Brazil) 2023 Copa Libertadores Final	Continental	(Brazil) Fluminense
4	Endurance racing	2023 8 Hours of Bahrain (WEC #7)	International	Hypercar: (Switzerland) Sébastien Buemi, (New Zealand) Brendon Hartley & (Japan) Ryō Hirakawa ( (Japan) Toyota Gazoo Racing); LMP2: (Portugal) Rui Andrade, (Switzerland) Louis Delétraz & (Poland) Robert Kubica ( (Belgium) Team WRT); LMGTE-Am: (Belgium) Sarah Bovy, (Switzerland) Rahel Frey & (Denmark) Michelle Gatting ( (Italy) Iron Dames)
5	Formula racing	(Brazil) 2023 São Paulo Grand Prix (F1 #20)	International	(Netherlands) Max Verstappen ( (Austria) Red Bull Racing-Honda RBPT)
5	Marathon	(United States) 2023 New York City Marathon	International	Men: (Ethiopia) Tamirat Tola; Women: (Kenya) Hellen Obiri
5–19	Association football	(Ivory Coast) 2023 CAF Women's Champions League	Continental	(South Africa) Mamelodi Sundowns
7	Horse racing	(Australia) 2023 Melbourne Cup	International	Horse: (Republic of Ireland) Without A Fight; Jockey: (Australia) Mark Zahra; Trainer: (Australia) Anthony & Sam Freedman
7–12	Handball	(Saudi Arabia) 2023 IHF Men's Super Globe	International	(Germany) SC Magdeburg
7–12	Tennis	(Spain) 2023 Billie Jean King Cup Finals	International	Canada
9–11	Softball	(American Samoa) 2023 Men's Softball Oceania Championship	Continental	Australia
9–12	Gymnastics	(United Kingdom) 2023 Trampoline Gymnastics World Championships	International	United States
10–12	Rugby sevens	(Australia) 2023 Oceania Sevens Championship (Australia) 2023 Oceania Women's Sevens Championship	Continental	Men: New Zealand; Women: Australia
10 – 2 December	Association football	(Indonesia) 2023 FIFA U-17 World Cup	International	Germany
11	Mixed martial arts	(United States) UFC 295: Procházka vs. Pereira	International	(Brazil) Alex Pereira
11–19	Darts	(England) 2023 Grand Slam of Darts	International	(England) Luke Humphries
12	Motorcycle racing	(Malaysia) 2023 Malaysian motorcycle Grand Prix (Moto GP #19)	International	MotoGP: (Italy) Enea Bastianini ( (Italy) Ducati Lenovo Team); Moto2: (Spain) Fermín Aldeguer ( (Italy) Beta Tools Speed Up); Moto3: (Netherlands) Collin Veijer ( (Germany) Liqui Moly Husqvarna Intact GP)
12–19	Tennis	(Italy) 2023 ATP Finals	International	(Serbia) Novak Djokovic
13–19	Snooker	(England) 2023 Champion of Champions	International	(Northern Ireland) Mark Allen
14–18	Handball	(Argentina) 2023 South and Central American Women's Junior Handball Championship	Continental	Argentina
15–23	Weightlifting	(Mexico) 2023 Junior World Weightlifting Championships	International	Armenia
16–19	Baseball	(Japan) 2023 Asia Professional Baseball Championship	Continental	Japan
16–19	Rallying	2023 Rally Japan (WRC #13)	International	WRC: (United Kingdom) Elfyn Evans & (United Kingdom) Scott Martin ( (Japan) Toyota Gazoo Racing WRT); WRC-2: (Norway) Andreas Mikkelsen & (Norway) Torstein Eriksen ( (Germany) Toksport WRT 3); WRC-3: (Canada) Jason Bailey & (Canada) Shayne Peterson
16–20	Wushu	(United States) 2023 World Wushu Championships	International	China
17–19	Judo	(Germany) 2023 European U23 Judo Championships	Continental	Netherlands
17–26	Multi-sport	(Chile) 2023 Parapan American Games	Continental	Brazil
18	Formula racing	(United States) 2023 Las Vegas Grand Prix (F1 #21)	International	(Netherlands) Max Verstappen ( (Austria) Red Bull Racing-Honda RBPT)
18–25	Curling	(Scotland) 2023 European Curling Championships	Continental	Men: Scotland; Women: Switzerland
19	Canadian football	(Canada) 110th Grey Cup	Domestic	(Quebec) Montreal Alouettes
19	Motorcycle racing	2023 Qatar motorcycle Grand Prix (Moto GP #20)	International	MotoGP: (Italy) Fabio Di Giannantonio ( (Italy) Gresini Racing MotoGP); Moto2: (Spain) Fermín Aldeguer ( (Italy) Beta Tools Speed Up); Moto3: (Spain) Jaume Masià ( (Luxembourg) Leopard Racing)
19 – 2 December	Multi-sport	(Solomon Islands) 2023 Pacific Games	Regional	New Caledonia
21–26	Tennis	(Spain) 2023 Davis Cup Finals	International	Italy
24–26	Darts	(England) 2023 Players Championship Finals	International	(England) Luke Humphries
24 – 3 December	Surfing	(Brazil) 2023 ISA World Junior Surfing Championship	International	Brazil
25 – 3 December	Snooker	(England) 2023 UK Championship (Triple Crown #1)	International	(England) Ronnie O'Sullivan
26	Formula racing	(United Arab Emirates) 2023 Abu Dhabi Grand Prix (F1 #22)	International	(Netherlands) Max Verstappen ( (Austria) Red Bull Racing-Honda RBPT)
26 – 3 December	Table tennis	(Slovenia) 2023 ITTF World Youth Championships	International	China
26	Motorcycle racing	2023 Valencian Community motorcycle Grand Prix (Moto GP #21)	International	MotoGP: (Italy) Francesco Bagnaia ( (Italy) Ducati Lenovo Team); Moto2: (Spain) Fermín Aldeguer ( (Italy) Speed Up Racing); Moto3: (Japan) Ayumu Sasaki ( (Germany) Liqui Moly Husqvarna Intact GP)
28 – 2 December	Tennis	(Saudi Arabia) 2023 Next Generation ATP Finals	International	(Serbia) Hamad Medjedovic
29 – 10 December	Field hockey	(Chile) 2023 Women's FIH Hockey Junior World Cup	International	Netherlands
29 – 17 December	Handball	(Denmark) / (Norway) / (Sweden) 2023 World Women's Handball Championship	International	France

=== December ===
Date	Sport	Venue/Event	Status	Winner/s
2–3	Taekwondo	(United Kingdom) 2023 World Taekwondo Grand Prix Final	International	China
2–10	Darts	(England) 2023 WDF World Darts Championship	International	Men: (Belgium) Andy Baetens; Women: (England) Beau Greaves
2–10	Floorball	(Singapore) 2023 Women's World Floorball Championships	International	Sweden
3–10	Baseball	(Taiwan) 2023 Asian Baseball Championship	Continental	Japan
3–10	Beach soccer	(Paraguay) 2023 Copa Libertadores de Fútbol Playa	Continental	(Paraguay) San Antonio
4–10	Table tennis	(China) 2024 ITTF Mixed Team World Cup	International	China
5–10	Swimming	(Romania) 2023 European Short Course Swimming Championships	Continental	Great Britain
5–16	Field hockey	(Malaysia) 2023 Men's FIH Hockey Junior World Cup	International	Germany
6–10	Volleyball	(India) 2023 FIVB Volleyball Men's Club World Championship	International	(Italy) Sir Sircoma Perugia
7–10	Figure skating	(China) 2023–24 Grand Prix of Figure Skating Final	International	Japan
7–10	Taekwondo	(Romania) 2023 European U21 Taekwondo Championships	Continental	Turkey
8–17	Basketball	(Egypt) 2023 Africa Women's Basketball League	Continental	(Egypt) Sporting Alexandria
8–17	Cricket	(United Arab Emirates) 2023 ACC Under-19 Asia Cup	Continental	Bangladesh
9	Basketball	(United States) 2023 NBA In-Season Tournament championship game	Domestic	(California) Los Angeles Lakers
10	Cross country running	(Belgium) 2023 European Cross Country Championships	Continental	Great Britain
10–17	Skateboarding	(Japan) 2023 Street Skateboarding World Championships	International	Men: (France) Aurélien Giraud; Women: (Brazil) Rayssa Leal
12–22	Association football	(Saudi Arabia) 2023 FIFA Club World Cup	International	(England) Manchester City
13–17	Badminton	(China) 2023 BWF World Tour Finals	International	Men: (Denmark) Viktor Axelsen; Women: (Chinese Taipei) Tai Tzu-ying
13–17	Volleyball	(China) 2023 FIVB Volleyball Women's Club World Championship	International	(Turkey) Eczacıbaşı Dynavit
15 – 3 January 2024	Darts	(England) 2024 PDC World Darts Championship	International	(England) Luke Humphries
16	Judo	(Kosovo) 2023 European Judo Championships Open	Continental	Men: (Kosovo) Akil Gjakova; Women: (Georgia (country)) Eteri Liprteliani
16	Mixed martial arts	(United States) UFC 296: Edwards vs. Covington	International	(United Kingdom) Leon Edwards
26–28	Chess	(Uzbekistan) World Rapid Chess Championship 2023	International	Open: (Norway) Magnus Carlsen; Women: (FIDE) Anastasia Bodnaruk
26 – 5 January 2024	Ice hockey	(Sweden) 2024 World Junior Ice Hockey Championships	International	United States
28 – 6 January 2024	Ski jumping	(Germany) / (Austria) 2023–24 Four Hills Tournament	International	(Japan) Ryōyū Kobayashi
29–30	Chess	(Uzbekistan) World Blitz Chess Championship 2023	International	Open: (Norway) Magnus Carlsen; Women: (FIDE) Valentina Gunina
29 – 7 January 2024	Tennis	(Australia) 2024 United Cup	International	Germany
30 – 7 January 2024	Cross-country skiing	(Italy) / (Switzerland) 2023–24 Tour de Ski	International	Men: (Norway) Harald Østberg Amundsen; Women: (United States) Jessie Diggins

== Multi-sport events ==
- January 12–22: 2023 Winter World University Games in (United States) Lake Placid
  - (gold) : Japan, (silver) : South Korea, (bronze) : Canada
- January 21–28: 2023 European Youth Olympic Winter Festival in Friuli-Venezia Giulia
  - (gold) : France, (silver) : Italy, (bronze) : Switzerland
- January 29 – February 4: 2023 Arctic Winter Games in (Canada) / Wood Buffalo
  - (gold) : Yukon, (silver) : Alaska, (bronze) : Alberta North
- May 5–17: 2023 SEA Games in (Cambodia) Phnom Penh
  - (gold) : Vietnam, (silver) : Thailand, (bronze) : Indonesia
- May 12–20: 2023 Asia Pacific Masters Games in (South Korea) North Jeolla Province
- May 28 – June 3: 2023 Games of the Small States of Europe in Valletta
  - (gold) : Malta, (silver) : Cyprus, (bronze) : Luxembourg
- June 17–25: 2023 Special Olympics World Summer Games in (Germany) Berlin
  - There is no official medal table.
- June 21 – July 2: 2023 European Games in (Poland) Kraków & Małopolska
  - (gold) : Italy, (silver) : Spain, (bronze) : Ukraine
- June 23 – July 8: 2023 Central American and Caribbean Games in (El Salvador) San Salvador
  - (gold) : Mexico, (silver) : Colombia, (bronze) : Cuba
- June 24–30: 2023 African Beach Games in Hammamet
  - (gold) : Algeria, (silver) : Tunisia, (bronze) : Morocco
- June 26 – July 9: 2023 European Masters Games in (Finland) Tampere
  - There is no official medal table.
- July 5–15: 2023 Pan Arab Games in Algeria
  - (gold) : Algeria, (silver) : Tunisia, (bronze) : Morocco
- July 8–14: 2023 Island Games in Guernsey
  - (gold) : Guernsey, (silver) : Jersey, (bronze) : Isle of Man
- July 23–29: 2023 European Youth Summer Olympic Festival in (Slovenia) Maribor
  - (gold) : Italy, (silver) : Germany, (bronze) : France
- July 28 – August 6: 2023 World Police and Fire Games in Winnipeg
  - (gold) : United States, (silver) : Canada, (bronze) : India
- July 28 – August 6: 2023 Jeux de la Francophonie in (Democratic Republic of the Congo) Kinshasa
  - (gold) : Morocco, (silver) : Romania, (bronze) : Cameroon
- July 28 – August 8: 2021 Summer World University Games in Chengdu
  - (gold) : China, (silver) : Japan, (bronze) : South Korea
- August 4–11: 2023 Commonwealth Youth Games in (Trinidad and Tobago) Port of Spain
  - (gold) : Australia, (silver) : England, (bronze) : Scotland
- August 5–12: 2023 World Beach Games in (Indonesia) Bali
  - Cancelled
- September 9–16: 2023 Mediterranean Beach Games in Heraklion
  - (gold) : Italy, (silver) : Greece, (bronze) : Spain
- September 23 – October 8: 2022 Asian Games in Hangzhou
  - (gold) : China, (silver) : Japan, (bronze) : South Korea
- October 20 – November 5: 2023 Pan American Games in (Chile) Santiago
- October 21–30: 2023 World Combat Games in (Saudi Arabia) Riyadh
- October 22–28: 2022 Asian Para Games in (China) Hangzhou
- November 17–26: 2021 Asian Indoor and Martial Arts Games in (Thailand) Bangkok and Chonburi
- November 19 – December 2: 2023 Pacific Games in (Solomon Islands) Honiara
- TBD: 2023 Military World Games in (Colombia) Bogotá
- TBD: 2023 Indian Ocean Island Games in (Madagascar) Antananarivo
- TBD: 2023 Asian Beach Games in (China) Sanya
- TBD: 2023 South American Beach Games in (Colombia) Santa Marta
- 2023 World Transplant Games April in Australia
- 2023 World Dwarf Games Germany
- 2023 Cerebral Palsy Games United Kingdom
- 2023 European Heart and Lung Transplant Championships
- 2023 European Transplant and Dialysis Sports Games
- 2023 World Company Games Mexico
- 2023 Reykjavik International Games Iceland
- 2023 CSIT World Workers Games Italy
- 2022 International Children's Games
- 2023 Senior Olympics
- 2023 Huntsman World Senior Games
- 2023 Newruz Games
- 2023 Gratitude Games
- 2023 ALBA Games Venezuela
- 2023 European Masters Games Finland July
- 2023 GCC Games
- 2023 World Combat Games
- 2023 Croatian World Games
- 2023 Pan Pacific Masters Games
- 2023 World University Combat World Cup (2nd)
- 2023 Children of Asia Winter Games
- 2023 CIS Games
- University International Sports Festival 2023
- Summer Games of Deaf Athletes in Russia 2023 in 20 Sports
- ISF U15 Gymnasiade 2023. Rio, Brazil. 19/08-27/08
- 2023 North American Indigenous Games
- 2023 World Medi Games
- 2023 IBSA World Games United Kingdom
- 2023 IWAS World Games Thailand Abilitysports
- 2024 South Asian Games
- 2023 East Asian Youth Games
- 2023 Arab Games
- 2023 World Dwarf Games
- 2023 Phygital Games

== See also ==
- 2023 in sports (A)
- 2023 in sports (B)
- 2023 in sports (C–J)
- 2023 in sports (K–S)
- 2023 in sports (T–Z)
