= Vanessa Marina =

Portuguese breakdancer (born 1992)

Personal information
- Full name: Vanessa Marina Cartaxo Farinha
- Nickname: B-Girl Vanessa
- Born: 21 March 1992 (age 34) Leiria, Portugal

Sport
- Country: Portugal
- Sport: Breaking
Medal record
Breaking
Representing Portugal
WDSF European Championships
Bronze medal – third place	2022 Manchester	B-Girls

Vanessa Marina Cartaxo Farinha (born 21 March 1992) is a Portuguese breaker. She represented Portugal at the 2024 Summer Olympics, the first time breaking was featured at the games.

== Biography ==
Marina was born on 21 March 1992 in Leiria, Portugal. She began breaking in 2012, after being introduced to the sport by a friend. Two years later, she moved from Lisbon to London to pursue breaking as a career and would help "evolve the UK B-girl scene."

She has competed several times in the Red Bull BC One competition; in 2019, she won the gold medal in the competition's UK cypher. After losing in the final battle of the 2020 UK cypher, she began competing in the competition's Portugal cypher. She won the latter in 2021, but failed to qualify for the world final. The following year, she once again won the Portugal cypher and qualified for the Red Bull BC One World Final, reaching the quarterfinals before being knocked out by Chinese dancer 671. Marina also competed at the 2022 European Championship, winning the bronze medal. She reached the quarterfinals at the event the following year. She also competed at the 2023 European Games. Overcoming an injury scare, she qualified for the 2024 Summer Olympics in Paris, with the event marking the first time breaking was featured at the Olympic Games.
