= 2023 Prix de l'Arc de Triomphe =

102nd Prix de l'Arc de Triomphe
- Prix de l'Arc de Triomphe
- Location: Longchamp Racecourse
- Date: 1 October 2023
- Winning horse: Ace Impact
- Starting price: 5/2
- Jockey: Cristian Demuro
- Trainer: Jean-Claude Rouget
- Owner: Serge Stempniak and Gousserie Racing
- Conditions: Good to Soft

The 2023 Prix de l'Arc de Triomphe was a horse race held at Longchamp Racecourse on Sunday 1 October 2023. It was the 102nd running of the Prix de l'Arc de Triomphe. The race was won by Serge Stempniak and Gousserie Racing's three-year-old colt Ace Impact, trained in France by Jean-Claude Rouget and ridden by Cristian Demuro. It was a second win in the race for Rouget and Demuro, who had previously won the 2020 Arc with Sottsass. Ace Impact became the first French-trained three-year-old colt to win the Arc since Rail Link in 2006.

Ace Impact defeated Westover by one and three-quarter lengths, with Onesto finishing third and Through Seven Seas fourth. Sent off as the 5/2 favourite, Ace Impact remained unbeaten after six starts and won the Arc on his first attempt over 2,400 metres.

The race was run on good to soft ground and attracted 15 runners. Ace Impact was held towards the rear of the field before making his move around the final turn. He produced a strong acceleration in the straight to pass his rivals and win decisively.

== Full result ==
The below result is sourced from Racing Post, France Galop, and Sporting Life.

| Pos. | Draw | Time | Marg. | Horse | Age | Jockey | Trainer (Country) |
|---|---|---|---|---|---|---|---|
| 1 | 8 | 2:25.50 | | Ace Impact | 3 | Cristian Demuro | Jean-Claude Rouget (FR) |
| 2 | 1 | | 1 3/4 | Westover | 4 | Rob Hornby | Ralph Beckett (GB) |
| 3 | 9 | | short head | Onesto | 4 | Maxime Guyon | Fabrice Chappet (FR) |
| 4 | 5 | | 1 1/4 | Through Seven Seas | 5 | Christophe Lemaire | Tomohito Ozeki (JPN) |
| 5 | 7 | | neck | Continuous | 3 | Ryan Moore | Aidan O'Brien (IRE) |
| 6 | 6 | | 2 1/2 | Bay Bridge | 5 | Richard Kingscote | Sir Michael Stoute (GB) |
| 7 | 13 | | nose | Sisfahan | 5 | Lukas Delozier | Henk Grewe (GER) |
| 8 | 2 | | short head | Feed The Flame | 3 | Christophe Soumillon | Pascal Bary (FR) |
| 9 | 14 | | head | Hukum | 6 | Jim Crowley | Owen Burrows (GB) |
| 10 | 15 | | short neck | Simca Mille | 4 | Alexis Pouchin | Stephane Wattel (FR) |
| 11 | 12 | | head | Fantastic Moon | 3 | Rene Piechulek | Sarah Steinberg (GER) |
| 12 | 11 | | 5 | Place Du Carrousel | 4 | Mickael Barzalona | André Fabre (FR) |
| 13 | 3 | | head | Free Wind | 5 | Frankie Dettori | John & Thady Gosden (GB) |
| 14 | 4 | | 1 1/2 | Haya Zark | 4 | Gerald Mosse | Adrien Fouassier (FR) |
| 15 | 10 | | 1 1/2 | Mr Hollywood | 3 | Bauyrzhan Murzabayev | Henk Grewe (GER) |

== Race details ==
- Sponsor: Qatar Racing and Equestrian Club
- Purse: €5,000,000
- Going: Good to Soft
- Distance: 2,400 metres
- Number of runners: 15
- Winner's time: 2:25.50
