= 2023 European U17 Wrestling Championships =

2023 European Cadets Championships
- Host city: Tirana, Albania
- Dates: 12–18 June 2023
- Stadium: Parku Olimpik Feti Borova

Champions
- Freestyle: Armenia
- Greco-Roman: Georgia
- Women: Turkey

The 2023 European Cadets Wrestling Championships (U-17) is the 25th edition of European Cadets Wrestling Championship of combined events, and takes place from June 12 to 18 in Tirana, Albania. In accordance with sanctions imposed following by the 2022 Russian invasion of Ukraine, wrestlers from Russia and Belarus were not permitted to use the name, flag, or anthem of Russia or Belarus. They instead participated as "Individual Neutral Athletes" (AIN). Nevertheless, in protest against participation of Individual Neutral Athletes, the Ukrainian team withdrew from the championships.

== Competition schedule ==
All times are (UTC+2)

Date	Time	Event
12 June	11.30-15.00	Qualification rounds GR – 48-55-65-80-110 kg
12 June	18.00-19.30	Semi-finals GR – 48-55-65-80-110 kg
13 June	11.30-14.30	Qualification rounds GR – 45-51-60-71-92 kg; Repechage GR – 48-55-65-80-110 kg
13 June	17.00-17.45	Semi-finals: GR – 45-51-60-71-92 kg
13 June	18.00-20.00	Finals GR – 48-55-65-80-110 kg
14 June	11.30-14.00	Qualification rounds WW – 43-49-57-65-73 kg; Repechage GR – 45-51-60-71-92 kg
14 June	17.00-17.45	Semi-finals WW – 43-49-57-65-73 kg
14 June	18.00-20.00	Finals GR – 45-51-60-71-92 kg
15 June	11.30-14.00	Qualification rounds WW – 40-46-53-61-69 kg; Repechage WW – 43-49-57-65-73 kg
15 June	17.00-17.45	Semi-finals WW – 40-46-53-61-69 kg
15 June	18.00-20.00	Finals WW – 43-49-57-65-73 kg
16 June	11.30-14.00	Qualification rounds FS – 48-55-65-80-110 kg; Repechage WW – 40-46-53-61-69 kg
16 June	17.00-17.45	Semi-finals: FS – 48-55-65-80-110 kg
16 June	18.00-20.00	Finals WW – 40-46-53-61-69 kg
17 June	11.30-14.00	Qualification rounds FS – 45-51-60-71-92 kg; Repechage FS – 48-55-65-80-110 kg
17 June	16.45-17.45	Semi-finals: FS – 45-51-60-71-92 kg
17 June	18.00-21.00	Finals FS – 48-55-65-80-110 kg
18 June	16.30-17.45	Repechage : FS – 45-51-60-71-92 kg
18 June	18.00-20.00	Finals : FS – 45-51-60-71-92 kg

== Medal table ==
* Host nation (Albania)

Rank	Nation	Gold	Silver	Bronze	Total
–	Individual Neutral Athletes ^{a}	9	9	14	32
1	Georgia	5	4	6	15
2	Azerbaijan	5	1	8	14
3	Armenia	2	5	6	13
4	Germany	2	1	1	4
5	Turkey	1	6	7	14
6	Hungary	1	2	3	6
7	Moldova	1	1	0	2
7	Poland	1	1	0	2
9	Sweden	1	0	4	5
10	Croatia	1	0	0	1
10	Italy	1	0	0	1
12	Romania	0	0	3	3
13	Greece	0	0	2	2
13	Serbia	0	0	2	2
15	Bulgaria	0	0	1	1
15	Estonia	0	0	1	1
15	Spain	0	0	1	1
Totals (17 entries)		30	30	59	119

== Russian and Belarusian participation ==
a In accordance with sanctions imposed following by the 2022 Russian invasion of Ukraine, wrestlers from Russia and Belarus were not permitted to use the name, flag, or anthem of Russia or Belarus. They instead participated as "Individual Neutral Athletes (AIN)", their medals were not included in the official medal table.

== Team ranking ==
Rank	Men's freestyle		Men's Greco-Roman		Women's freestyle	
Rank	Team	Points	Team	Points	Team	Points
1	Armenia	169	Georgia	185	Turkey	106
2	Azerbaijan	155	Azerbaijan	118	Germany	92
3	Georgia	150	Armenia	115	Sweden	90
4	Turkey	120	Hungary	83	Hungary	77
5	Germany	63	Turkey	80	Poland	62
6	Moldova	49	Moldova	44	Romania	41
7	Bulgaria	48	Serbia	31	Bulgaria	39
8	Poland	34	Greece	29	Azerbaijan	32
9	Hungary	34	Germany	28	Croatia	31
10	France	22	Poland	25	Italy	31

== Medal overview ==
=== Men's freestyle ===
Event	Gold	Silver	Bronze
45 kg	Jafar Jafarov; Azerbaijan	Mate Tsinadze; Georgia	Ebubekir Gür; Turkey
45 kg	Jafar Jafarov; Azerbaijan	Mate Tsinadze; Georgia	Eskender Dagirov; Individual Neutral Athletes
48 kg	Magomed Magomedov; Individual Neutral Athletes	Arman Harutyunyan; Armenia	Gegi Oniani; Georgia
48 kg	Magomed Magomedov; Individual Neutral Athletes	Arman Harutyunyan; Armenia	Hleb Piatrou; Individual Neutral Athletes
51 kg	Giorgi Maisuradze; Georgia	Sasha Petrosyan; Armenia	Seyhun Alizada; Azerbaijan
51 kg	Giorgi Maisuradze; Georgia	Sasha Petrosyan; Armenia	Rakhul Umudov; Individual Neutral Athletes
55 kg	Haji Karimov; Azerbaijan	Samvel Gevorgyan; Armenia	Arshak Lulukyan; Georgia
55 kg	Haji Karimov; Azerbaijan	Samvel Gevorgyan; Armenia	Ibragimgadzhi Magomedov; Individual Neutral Athletes
60 kg	Jamal Abbasov; Azerbaijan	Akramat Shakriev; Individual Neutral Athletes	Vahid Samed Yılmaz; Turkey
60 kg	Jamal Abbasov; Azerbaijan	Akramat Shakriev; Individual Neutral Athletes	Tigran Buniatyan; Armenia
65 kg	Manuel Wagin; Germany	Remzi Temur; Turkey	Mirzaagha Akhundov; Azerbaijan
65 kg	Manuel Wagin; Germany	Remzi Temur; Turkey	Vladimir Azaryan; Armenia
71 kg	Narek Nikoghosyan; Armenia	Islam Kazharov; Individual Neutral Athletes	Ferhat Yiğit; Turkey
71 kg	Narek Nikoghosyan; Armenia	Islam Kazharov; Individual Neutral Athletes	İsmayil Rahimli; Azerbaijan
80 kg	Alexandru Bors; Moldova	Razmik Yepremyan; Armenia	David Adrian Metea; Romania
80 kg	Alexandru Bors; Moldova	Razmik Yepremyan; Armenia	Konstantine Petriashvili; Georgia
92 kg	Sandro Kurashvili; Georgia	Eyyüp Çetin; Turkey	Aliaksei Kulakou; Individual Neutral Athletes
92 kg	Sandro Kurashvili; Georgia	Eyyüp Çetin; Turkey	Magomed Gasanov; Individual Neutral Athletes
110 kg	Yusif Dursunov; Azerbaijan	Henrik Haykyan; Armenia	Ruşen Arda Güler; Turkey
110 kg	Yusif Dursunov; Azerbaijan	Henrik Haykyan; Armenia	Aleksandre Abramishvili; Georgia

=== Men's Greco-Roman ===
Event	Gold	Silver	Bronze
45 kg	Turan Dashdamirov; Azerbaijan	Rustem Abatsiev; Individual Neutral Athletes	Mehmet Sarp; Turkey
45 kg	Turan Dashdamirov; Azerbaijan	Rustem Abatsiev; Individual Neutral Athletes	Yurik Mkhitaryan; Armenia
48 kg	Murat Khatit; Individual Neutral Athletes	Iuri Chapidze; Georgia	Petro Zhytovoz; Hungary
48 kg	Murat Khatit; Individual Neutral Athletes	Iuri Chapidze; Georgia	Elnar Ziyadov; Azerbaijan
51 kg	Ilia Kandalin; Individual Neutral Athletes	Peter Totok; Hungary	Ali Seyidalili; Azerbaijan
51 kg	Ilia Kandalin; Individual Neutral Athletes	Peter Totok; Hungary	Koba Karumidze; Georgia
55 kg	Erekle Tavberidze; Georgia	Maxim Sarmanov; Moldova	Vasileios Papageorgiou; Greece
55 kg	Erekle Tavberidze; Georgia	Maxim Sarmanov; Moldova	Aykhan Javadov; Azerbaijan
60 kg	Kiryl Valeuski; Individual Neutral Athletes	Halil Çınar; Turkey	Samvel Terteryan; Armenia
60 kg	Kiryl Valeuski; Individual Neutral Athletes	Halil Çınar; Turkey	Saba Surmanidze; Georgia
65 kg	Petros Ashkaryan; Armenia	Giorgi Tchikaidze; Georgia	Zaur Beslekoev; Individual Neutral Athletes
65 kg	Petros Ashkaryan; Armenia	Giorgi Tchikaidze; Georgia	Constantin Lungu; Romania
71 kg	Abdurakhman Abdulkadyrov; Individual Neutral Athletes	Luka Lomadze; Georgia	Gor Khachatryan; Armenia
71 kg	Abdurakhman Abdulkadyrov; Individual Neutral Athletes	Luka Lomadze; Georgia	Alexander Sakas; Sweden
80 kg	Stanislaw Fussy; Poland	Szabolcs Szinay; Hungary	Ramazan Nekhai; Individual Neutral Athletes
80 kg	Stanislaw Fussy; Poland	Szabolcs Szinay; Hungary	Elmin Aliyev; Azerbaijan
92 kg	Saba Purtseladze; Georgia	Saipula Gadzhimagomedov; Individual Neutral Athletes	Grisha Voskanyan; Armenia
92 kg	Saba Purtseladze; Georgia	Saipula Gadzhimagomedov; Individual Neutral Athletes	Stevan Kojić; Serbia
110 kg	Saba Chilashvili; Georgia	Evgenii Repkin; Individual Neutral Athletes	Cemal Yusuf Bakır; Turkey
110 kg	Saba Chilashvili; Georgia	Evgenii Repkin; Individual Neutral Athletes	Mahir Gurbanli; Azerbaijan

=== Women's freestyle ===
Event	Gold	Silver	Bronze
40 kg	Klara Winkler; Germany	Fatma Yılmaz; Turkey	Raniia Rakhmanova; Individual Neutral Athletes
43 kg	Aleksandra Berezovskaia; Individual Neutral Athletes	Yağmur Karabacak; Turkey	Maya Johansson; Sweden
43 kg	Aleksandra Berezovskaia; Individual Neutral Athletes	Yağmur Karabacak; Turkey	Maria Gkika; Greece
46 kg	Valeriya Yerameyeva; Individual Neutral Athletes	Dominika Konkel; Poland	Josephine Wrensch; Germany
46 kg	Valeriya Yerameyeva; Individual Neutral Athletes	Dominika Konkel; Poland	Diana Rybchenko; Individual Neutral Athletes
49 kg	Sviatlana Katenka; Individual Neutral Athletes	Violetta Biriukova; Individual Neutral Athletes	Nil Aktaş; Turkey
49 kg	Sviatlana Katenka; Individual Neutral Athletes	Violetta Biriukova; Individual Neutral Athletes	Vera Sjölander; Sweden
53 kg	Fabiana Rinella; Italy	Olga Ovchinnikova; Individual Neutral Athletes	Valeryia Mikitsich; Individual Neutral Athletes
53 kg	Fabiana Rinella; Italy	Olga Ovchinnikova; Individual Neutral Athletes	Lisette Bödtker; Estonia
57 kg	Sophie Ritter; Hungary	Ruzanna Mammadova; Azerbaijan	Rosa Molina Rodriguez; Spain
57 kg	Sophie Ritter; Hungary	Ruzanna Mammadova; Azerbaijan	Viktoria Boynova; Bulgaria
61 kg	Ekaterina Radysheva; Individual Neutral Athletes	Leonie Steigert; Germany	Éda Balázs; Hungary
61 kg	Ekaterina Radysheva; Individual Neutral Athletes	Leonie Steigert; Germany	Varvara Aliseyenka; Individual Neutral Athletes
65 kg	Duygu Gen; Turkey	Margarita Salnazarian; Individual Neutral Athletes	Wilma Hoffman; Sweden
65 kg	Duygu Gen; Turkey	Margarita Salnazarian; Individual Neutral Athletes	Sabina Petrache; Romania
69 kg	Veronika Vilk; Croatia	Elif Şevval Kurt; Turkey	Evelin Ujhelji; Serbia
69 kg	Veronika Vilk; Croatia	Elif Şevval Kurt; Turkey	Liliana Kazmina; Individual Neutral Athletes
73 kg	Elvira Ersson; Sweden	Aliaksandra Kazlova; Individual Neutral Athletes	Petra Mueller; Hungary
73 kg	Elvira Ersson; Sweden	Aliaksandra Kazlova; Individual Neutral Athletes	Diana Titova; Individual Neutral Athletes

== Participating nations ==
497 wrestlers from 34 nations:

1. Individual Neutral Athletes (59)
2. Albania (15)
3. Armenia (19)
4. Austria (6)
5. Azerbaijan (25)
6. Bulgaria (27)
7. Croatia (9)
8. Czech Republic (9)
9. Spain (5)
10. Estonia (15)
11. Finland (9)
12. France (13)
13. United Kingdom (4)
14. Georgia (22)
15. Germany (23)
16. Greece (19)
17. Hungary (25)
18. Ireland (1)
19. Israel (11)
20. Italy (12)
21. Kosovo (3)
22. Latvia (9)
23. Lithuania (14)
24. Moldova (16)
25. North Macedonia (6)
26. Netherlands (5)
27. Norway (7)
28. Poland (24)
29. Romania (15)
30. Switzerland (5)
31. Slovenia (2)
32. Serbia (8)
33. Slovakia (10)
34. Sweden (15)
35. Turkey (30)
