= 2023 Epsom Derby =

244th running of the Epsom Derby horse race

- Epsom Derby
- Location: Epsom Downs Racecourse
- Date: 3 June 2023
- Winning horse: Auguste Rodin
- Starting price: 9-2
- Jockey: Ryan Moore
- Trainer: Aidan O'Brien
- Owner: Michael Tabor, Derrick Smith, Sue Magnier & Westerberg
- Conditions: Good to firm

Epsom Derby 2023
1-2-3
Auguste Rodin	King Of Steel	White Birch

Also Ran
4-5-6
Sprewell	The Foxes	Waipiro
7-8-9
Artistic Star	Adelaide River	Dubai Mile
10-11-12
Arrest	San Antonio	Passenger
13-14
Dear My Friend	Military Order	14 Ran

The 2023 Epsom Derby was the 244th annual running of the Derby horse race which took place at Epsom Downs Racecourse on 3 June 2023. Race time was at 1:30pm due to an FA Cup final broadcast clash, as ITV have the broadcasting rights to both events.

== Race card ==
No	Draw	Horse	Weight (st–lb)	Jockey	Trainer	Owner
1	14	Adelaide River	9–2	Seamie Heffernan	Aidan O'Brien (IRE)	Sue Magnier et al
2	13	Arrest	9–2	Frankie Dettori	John and Thady Gosden	Juddmonte
3	8	Artistic Star	9–2	Rob Hornby	Ralph Beckett	Jeff Smith
4	10	Auguste Rodin	9–2	Ryan Moore	Aidan O'Brien (IRE)	Michael Tabor et al
5	1	Dear My Friend	9–2	Andrea Atzeni	Charlie Johnston	Middleham Racing
6	5	Dubai Mile	9–2	Danny Muscutt	Charlie Johnston	Ahmad al Shiakh
7	4	King Of Steel	9–2	Kevin Stott	Roger Varian	Amo Racing
8	9	Military Order	9–2	William Buick	Charlie Appleby	Godolphin
9	7	Passenger	9–2	Richard Kingscote	Michael Stoute	Flaxman Holdings
10	12	San Antonio	9–2	Wayne Lordan	Aidan O'Brien (IRE)	Michael Tabor et al
11	6	Sprewell	9–2	Shane Foley	Jessica Harrington (IRE)	Mohamed Khalid Mohamed Abdulrahim
12	3	The Foxes	9–2	Oisin Murphy	Andrew Balding	King Power Racing
13	11	Waipiro	9–2	Tom Marquand	Ed Walker	Siu Pak Kwan
14	2	White Birch	9-2	Colin Keane	John Joseph Murphy (IRE)	Chantal Regalado-Gonzalez

Trainers are based in Great Britain unless indicated.

== Result ==
1st - Auguste Rodin - 9-2

2nd - King Of Steel - 66-1

3rd - White Birch - 12-1

== Form analysis ==
=== Subsequent Group 1 wins ===
- Auguste Rodin – Irish Derby (2023), Irish Champion Stakes (2023), Breeders' Cup Turf (2023), Prince of Wales's Stakes (2024)
- King of Steel - Champion Stakes (2023)
- White Birch - Tattersalls Gold Cup (2024)
