= Gratitude Games =

Annual milti-sports competition

The Gratitude Games is an annual multi-sports "Olympics" competition for workers in the UK's NHS, police, fire service and other emergency services.

The inaugural Gratitude Games will take place in Manchester and Salford from 27 April to 29 May 2022.
