= 2023 WDSF European Breaking Championship =

International breakdancing competition

- Venue: Tinglados del Puerto de Almeria
- Location: Almería, Spain
- Dates: 6–7 May
- Competitors: 235 from 33 nations

The 2023 WDSF European Breaking Championship was held in Almería, Spain from May 6th to May 7th, 2023.

The top two finishers in each category qualified for the Olympic Qualifier Series. The championships were also a qualification event for the 2023 European Games.

== Medal table ==
* Host nation (Spain)

Rank	Nation	Gold	Silver	Bronze	Total
1	Netherlands	1	1	0	2
2	Lithuania	1	0	0	1
3	Ukraine	0	1	0	1
4	France	0	0	1	1
4	Spain*	0	0	1	1
Totals (5 entries)		2	2	2	6

== Medalists ==
Event	Gold	Silver	Bronze
B-Boy	Menno van Gorp; Netherlands	Lee-Lou Demierre; Netherlands	Juan De la Torre Sanchez; Spain
B-Girl	Dominika Banevič; Lithuania	Anna Ponomarenko; Ukraine	Sya Dembélé; France

== Participating nations ==
235 competitors from 33 nations participated:

1. Armenia (3)
2. Austria (8)
3. Belgium (9)
4. Bulgaria (7)
5. Canada (1)
6. Croatia (3)
7. Czech Republic (3)
8. Denmark (7)
9. England (8)
10. Finland (7)
11. France (22)
12. Germany (10)
13. Greece (1)
14. Hungary (6)
15. Ireland (5)
16. Israel (6)
17. Italy (12)
18. Latvia (5)
19. Lithuania (3)
20. Moldova (2)
21. Netherlands (6)
22. Norway (7)
23. Poland (9)
24. Portugal (6)
25. Romania (6)
26. Serbia (1)
27. Spain (23) (Host)
28. Slovakia (4)
29. Slovenia (4)
30. Switzerland (9)
31. Sweden (5)
32. Turkey (8)
33. Ukraine (19)

Athletes from Cyprus and Azerbaijan were also scheduled to compete, but were not present.
