= Ace Impact =

Thoroughbred racehorse

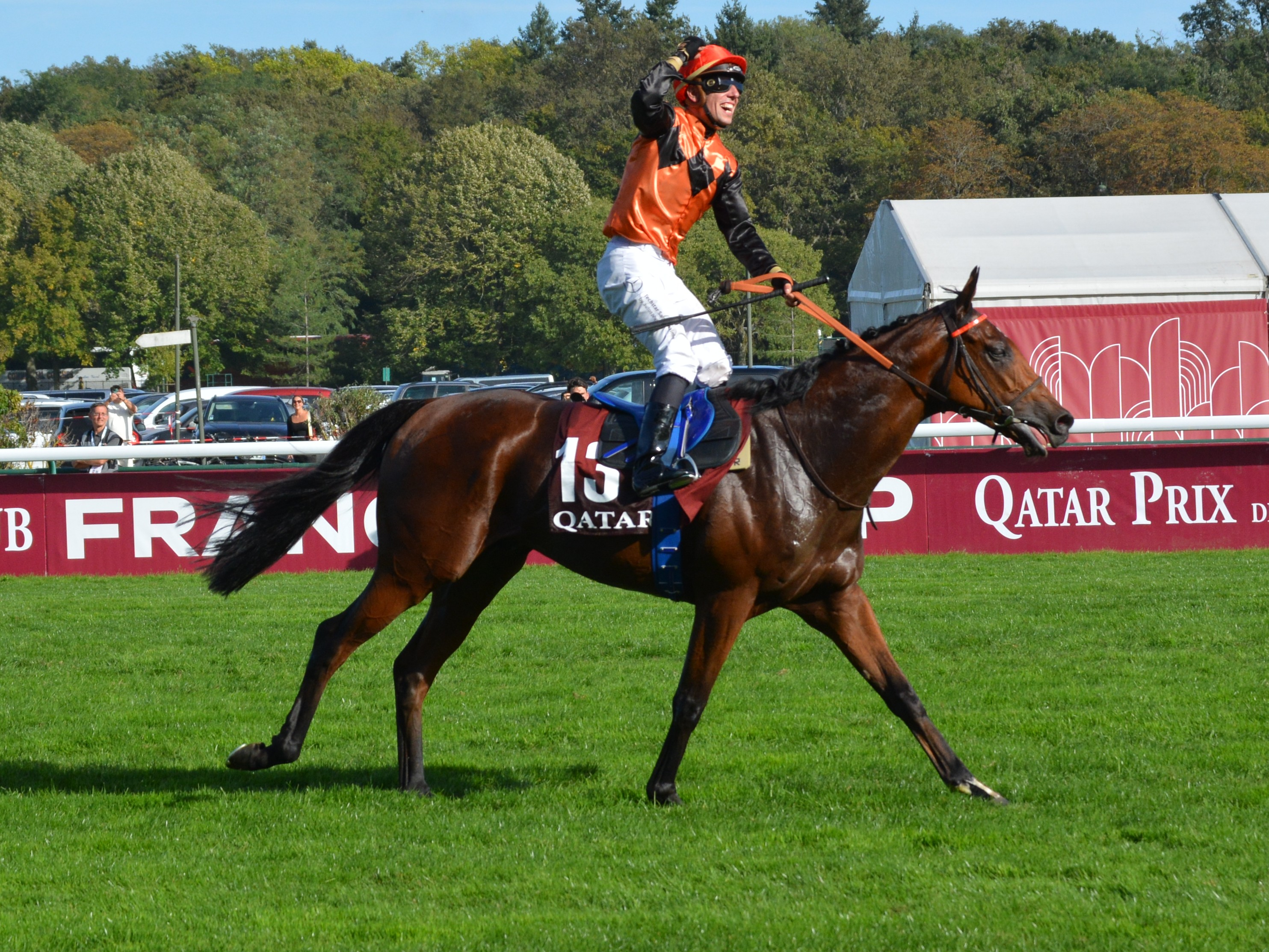
- Ace Impact and jockey Cristian Demuro at the 2023 Prix de l'Arc de Triomphe
- Breed: Thoroughbred
- Sire: Cracksman
- Grandsire: Frankel
- Dam: Absolutly Me
- Damsire: Anabaa Blue
- Sex: Colt
- Foaled: February 13, 2020 (age 6)
- Country: Ireland
- Breeder: Mrs Waltraut Spanner
- Owner: Ecuries Serge Stempniak
- Trainer: Jean-Claude Rouget
- Record: 6:6-0-0

Major wins
- Prix du Jockey Club (2023); Prix Guillaume d'Ornano (2023); Prix de l'Arc de Triomphe (2023)

Awards
- Cartier Horse of the Year (2023); Cartier Champion Three-year-old Colt (2023)
- Last updated on November 18, 2023

Ace Impact（born February 13, 2020）is an undefeated Irish-bred, French-trained thoroughbred racehorse. His major wins include the 2023 Prix du Jockey Club and Prix de l'Arc de Triomphe.

== Racing career ==
Ace Impact made his debut at a maiden race held at the Hippodrome de la Côte d'Azur on January 25, 2023, where he also made his first victory with Cristian Demuro at the helm. He ran and won his second race, an allowance race, on April 2 at the Hippodrome de Bordeaux le Bouscat with jockey Jean-Bernard Eyquem. The horse then won his third consecutive race at the Prix de Suresnes, a Listed Race held at Chantilly, with Demuro back as jockey.

Ace Impact ran the Prix du Jockey Club on June 4 as the 3rd most favored. The horse ran the race in the rear of the pack behind Marhaba Ya Sanafi. As the pack entered the final stretch, Ace Impact went in to the outside and picked up speed. At around the final 100-meter mark, the horse caught front runner Big Rock and won against him by three and a half lengths, marking his first Group 1 victory.

After a 2 months long break, Ace Impact entered the Prix Guillaume d'Ornano held on August 15, where he was the most favored to win with the odds of winning at 1.4. The horse started with stablemate Cambronne taking the lead, with Ace Impact trailing from 8 lengths behind in the back of the pack. The horse seemed to want to move up initially, but calmed down as the race went on. As the horse entered the final stretch from the outside alongside Al Riffa, Ace Impact passed the horse at the final 100 meters and beat him with 3/4 lengths.

Ace Impact then entered the Prix de l'Arc de Triomphe, held on October 1. The weather at Longchamps that day was very sunny, and many horses were sweating. Also, prior to the race Ace Impact acted excited. The horse was the most favored to win the race, with PMU having the odds set at 2.5, and the JRA's odds at 2.8.

With no clear runners anticipated, Mr Hollywood took the lead, with Ace Impact running from the 3rd furthest in the back alongside Through Seven Seas. After passing the half-way point of the False Straight, Ace Impact moved to the outside to catch up to the front. At the final stretch the other horses started to push up as they passed the Open Stretch. The horse sped up from the outside and took the lead, finishing the race with a length-and-three-quarters against second place Westover, and marking his 6th consecutive victory since his debut at one of the most prestigious races. The horse finished the race in 2:25.50, and the horse ran the last 3 furlongs at 33.06 seconds.

After this victory, there were plans to race in either the Champion Stakes or the Japan Cup. The latter race was seriously considered in order to defeat Equinox, who was rated the best horse in the world, but as the trip to Japan was deemed too long for the horse, the plan was quickly scrapped. It was ultimately decided, and announced on October 12, that he would retire from racing.

On November 9, Ace Impact was named the Horse of the Year and Champion Three-year-old Colt of the Cartier Awards. This was the first time since Treve in 2013 for a French-trained horse to be named the Cartier Horse of the Year.

== Racing statistics ==
The following is based on the statistics listed on JRA-VAN

Date	Track	Race	Distance and ground	Runners	Finished	Time	Jockey
January 26, 2023	Côte d'Azur	Maiden	2000 m All Weather	10	1st	2:05.52	C. Demuro
April 2, 2023	Bordeaux le Bouscat	Allowance	1900 m Turf	7	1st	2:10.80	J. Eyquem
May 4, 2023	Chantilly	Prix de Suresnes	2000 m Turf	8	1st	2:03.72	C. Demuro
June 4, 2023	Chantilly	Prix du Jockey Club	2100 m Turf	11	1st	2:02.63	C. Demuro
August 15, 2023	Deauville-La Touques	Prix Guillaume d'Ornano	2000 m Turf	8	1st	2:07.59	C. Demuro
October 1, 2023	Longchamps	Prix de l'Arc de Triomphe	2400 m Turf	15	1st	2:25.50	C. Demuro

== Stud career ==
Starting from the 2024 season, Ace Impact will stand stud at Haras de Beaumont in Normandy. His service fee is set at 40,000 Euros, the highest ever first-year fee for a French stallion.

== Pedigree ==
Pedigree of Ace Impact
Sire Cracksman b. 2014	Frankel b. 2008	Galileo	Sadler's Wells
Sire Cracksman b. 2014	Frankel b. 2008	Galileo	Urban Sea
Sire Cracksman b. 2014	Frankel b. 2008	Kind	Danehill
Sire Cracksman b. 2014	Frankel b. 2008	Kind	Rainbow Lake
Sire Cracksman b. 2014	Rhadegunda b. 2005	Pivotal	Polar Falcon
Sire Cracksman b. 2014	Rhadegunda b. 2005	Pivotal	Fearless Revival
Sire Cracksman b. 2014	Rhadegunda b. 2005	St Radegund	Green Desert
Sire Cracksman b. 2014	Rhadegunda b. 2005	St Radegund	On The House
Dam Absolutly Me b. 2009	Anabaa Blue b. 1998	Anabaa	Danzig
Dam Absolutly Me b. 2009	Anabaa Blue b. 1998	Anabaa	Balbonella
Dam Absolutly Me b. 2009	Anabaa Blue b. 1998	Allez Les Trois	Riverman
Dam Absolutly Me b. 2009	Anabaa Blue b. 1998	Allez Les Trois	Allegretta
Dam Absolutly Me b. 2009	Tadawul b. 2001	Diesis	Sharpen Up
Dam Absolutly Me b. 2009	Tadawul b. 2001	Diesis	Doubly Sure
Dam Absolutly Me b. 2009	Tadawul b. 2001	Barakat	Bustino
Dam Absolutly Me b. 2009	Tadawul b. 2001	Barakat	Rosia Bay

- Ibn Bey, winner of numerous Group I races, is a half brother to Barakat, who is Ace Impact's great-grand dam.
