= 2023 Asia Pacific Masters Games =

- Host city: North Jeolla, South Korea
- Motto: Enjoy Sports! Play Life!
- Athletes: 8,621 from 60 nations
- Events: 26 sports
- Opening: 12 May 2023
- Closing: 20 May 2023
- Website: https://www.apmg2023.kr

The 2023 Asia Pacific Masters Games (Korean: 2023 아시아 태평양 마스터즈 게임), the second edition of the Asia Pacific Masters Games, also known as Jeonbuk 2023, was held in the South Korean province of North Jeolla from 12 to 20 May 2023. Organised by the International Masters Games Association (IMGA), it is the second Masters Games for the Asia-Pacific region.

== Host city ==
North Jeolla was selected as the host of the inaugural edition of the Asia Pacific Masters Games during a bidding process in Lausanne, Switzerland in 2019.

== Venues ==
List of venues by administrative divisions.

=== Jeonju Specific City ===
- Jeonju Gymnasium - Basketball
- Jeonju High School Gymnasium - Basketball
- Vision College of Jeonju - Basketball, Squash
- Cheonil Bowling Alley - Bowling
- Jeonju Bike Arena - Cycling (Track)
- North Jeolla Sports Center - Squash
- Jeonju Wansan Swimming Pool - Swimming
- Jeonju Geunyeong Girls High School Gymnasium - Volleyball
- Hwasan Gymnasium - Wushu

=== Iksan City ===
- Iksan Sports Complex - Athletics (Track)
- Iksan City - Athletics (Road)
- Iksan Indoor Gymnasium - Badminton
- Kim's Rock Bowling Alley - Bowling
- Southern Top Bowling Alley - Bowling
- Iksan Geumma Stadium - Football
- Iksan Ungpo Triathlon Venue - Triathlon

=== Gunsan City ===
- Gunsan Wolmyeong Sports Complex - Baseball, Football, Table Tennis
- Gunsan Country Club - Golf

=== Jeongeup City ===
- Taein Seonghwang Stadium - Football
- Jeongeup Sintaein Football Stadium - Football

=== Gimje City ===
- Gimje Civic Stadium - Football
- Gimje International Hockey Field - Field hockey

=== Namwon City ===
- Namwon Chunhyanggol Sports Park - Roller Sports

=== Wanju County ===
- Wanju Saeng-gang Park Golf Course - Park Golf
- Woosuk University Gymnasium - Volleyball

=== Gochang County ===
- Gochang County Gymnasium - Judo

=== Buan County ===
- Buan Byeonsan Yachting Center - Sailing

=== Sunchang County ===
- Sunchang Public Stadium Tennis Court - Tennis

=== Imsil County ===
- North Jeolla International Archery Field - Archery
- North Jeolla International Shooting Range - Shooting

=== Muju County ===
- Muju MTB Race Track - Cycling (Mountain Biking)
- Muju Taekwondo Won T1 Stadium - Taekwondo

=== Jinan County ===
- Jinan Yongdam Dam - Cycling (Road)
- Jinan Culture and Art Stadium - Weightlifting

=== Jangsu County ===
- Jangsu Gaya Gateball Stadium - Gateball

== Emblem ==
The emblem that resembles people holding hands and playing sports is inspired by the eaves of Hanok represents friendship between participants, the dynamics of sports-for-all and the beauty and tradition of Korea.

== Mascots ==
Achi (left) and Taechi (right).

Achi and Taechi are the official mascots of the 2023 Asia Pacific Masters Games. Achi & Taechi are described as white and black magpies and were chosen as the oriental magpie is the official bird of the North Jeolla Province. These were the first Asia Pacific Masters Games to feature more than one mascot.

== Sports ==
The second edition of the Asia Pacific Masters Games in 2023 will include 26 sports. In 2023, Roller sports, sailing, triathlon, baseball, park golf, gateball, and judo will be added, while lion dance, netball, pencak silat will be removed.

2023 Asia-Pacific Masters Games Sporting Programmes

Individual

- Archery
- Athletics
- Badminton
- Cycling
- Golf
- Judo
- Roller sports
- Sailing
- Shooting
- Squash
- Swimming
- Table tennis
- Taekwondo
- Tennis
- Ten-pin bowling
- Triathlon
- Weightlifting
- Wushu

Team sports

- Baseball
- Basketball
- Football
- Hockey
- Softball
- Volleyball

Demonstrate events

- Park golf
- Gateball

== Results ==
1. Archery:
2. Athletics Road:
3. Athletics Track:
4. Athletics Field:
5. Badminton Men and Mixed:
6. Badminton Women:
7. Baseball and Softball:
8. Basketball:
9. Cycling Road:
10. Cycling Cross Country:
11. Cycling Track:
12. Hockey:
13. Football:
14. Golf:
15. Shooting:
16. Squash:
17. Table Tennis:
18. Taekwondo:
19. Tennis:
20. Triathlon:
21. Volleyball:
22. Weightlifting:
23. Bowling:
24. Gateball:
25. Judo:
26. Park Golf:
27. Roller Sports:
28. Sailing and Windsurfing:
29. Swimming Women:
30. Swimming Men:
31. Swimming Mixed:
32. Wushu:

== Participating nations ==
Below are the countries of origin of the participating athletes. Note that there are no national delegations in Masters Games, as the athletes compete on their own.

Compared to the previous period, the number of participants and countries was much less.

=== Asia Pacific ===
8621 people - Page 90-95:

8,621 Athletes - Only 2,099 Non-Korea

5,556 Accompanying Person

14,177 Total

1. South Korea (6,522)
2. Mongolia (566)
3. India (392)
4. China (278)
5. Hong Kong (135)
6. Japan (83)
7. Kazakhstan (78)
8. Malaysia (61)
9. Singapore (53)
10. Indonesia (27)
11. Sri Lanka (18)
12. Chinese Taipei (15)
13. Vietnam (7)
14. Macau (4)
15. Philippines (3)
16. Qatar (3)
17. Tajikistan (3)
18. Myanmar (2)
19. Kuwait (2)
20. Uzbekistan (2)
21. Kyrgyzstan (1)
22. Iran (1)
23. Bahrain (1)
24. Nepal (1)
25. Pakistan (1)
26. Bangladesh (1)
27. Brunei (1)
28. Thailand (1)

1. Australia (90)
2. New Zealand (16)
3. Fiji (7)
4. New Caledonia (1)
5. Papua New Guinea (1)
6. Guam (1)

=== Guests ===
243 Athletes from other nations:

1. Uganda (83)
2. United States (80)
3. Great Britain (15)
4. Canada (13)
5. France (7)
6. Hungary (5)
7. Switzerland (5)
8. South Africa (4)
9. Ukraine (4)
10. Russia (3)
11. Egypt (2)
12. Brazil (2)
13. Turkey (2)
14. Norway (2)
15. Germany (2)
16. Bulgaria (2)
17. Belgium (2)
18. Finland (2)
19. Burkina Faso (1)
20. Trinidad and Tobago (1)
21. Chile (1)
22. Guatemala (1)
23. Guyana (1)
24. Netherlands (1)
25. Italy (1)
26. Portugal (1)

== Medal summary ==
Page 95:

Number of medals:

2200 G, 1441 S, 1073 B, Total: 4714 Medals

Medal table
Sports	Gold	Silver	Bronze	Total
Archery	44	42	34	120
Athletics (R+T+F)	352	215	145	712
Badminton	177	173	193	543
Basketball	152	74	41	267
Cycling (R+T+MTB)	46	24	17	87
Football	82	79	0	161
Golf	14	13	10	37
Park golf	4	4	4	12
Gateball	6	5	6	17
Hockey	77	28	0	105
Shooting	52	30	27	109
Baseball	52	37	32	121
Squash	17	17	19	53
Swimming	364	264	187	815
Table tennis	92	62	100	254
Taekwondo	96	45	23	164
Tennis	77	56	63	196
Ten-pin bowling	32	31	29	92
Volleyball	86	46	24	156
Weightlifting	125	41	22	188
Wushu	89	30	20	139
Roller sports	52	46	29	127
Sailing	15	4	3	22
Judo	42	31	8	81
Triathlon	55	44	37	136
Total	2,200	1,441	1,073	4,714

=== Archery ===
==== Compound ====
30+

Event	Gold	Silver	Bronze
Men's Compound	India; Santhosh Kumar Josybhatla	South Korea; Kim Seunghwi	Not awarded

40+

Event	Gold	Silver	Bronze
Men's Compound	South Korea; Jinseok Hwang	India; Vignyanand Racherla	South Korea; Yunjae Choi
Women's Compound	South Korea; Jo In-joo	India; Rajeshwari Dontha	Not awarded

50+

Event	Gold	Silver	Bronze
Men's Compound	South Korea; Mooyang Lee	South Korea; Cho Yang-ho	Indonesia; Oke Kusuma
Women's Compound	South Korea; Soonam Lee	South Korea; Wonjeong Lee	Not awarded

==== Recurve ====
30+

Event	Gold	Silver	Bronze
Men's Recurve	South Korea; Woo Seok-jae	Mongolia; Gido Deo	South Korea; Pyeon Daebeom
Women's Recurve	South Korea; Kyuri Kang	South Korea; Hwang Gaeul	South Korea; Jung Eun-ji

40+

Event	Gold	Silver	Bronze
Men's Recurve	South Korea; Ann Aung	South Korea; Namcheol Lee	South Korea; Bongwon Lee
Women's Recurve	South Korea; Noh Yunhwa	South Korea; Miyeon Park	South Korea; Jeong Gahee

50+

Event	Gold	Silver	Bronze
Men's Recurve	South Korea; Kyungwon Lim	South Korea; Jeonggeun Lee	South Korea; Lee Hyo-sik
Women's Recurve	Mongolia; Zanaa Jurmed	Mongolia; Regzedma Ravjil	Mongolia; Bymbasuren Shagdar

=== Athletics ===
30+

Men

Event	Gold	Silver	Bronze
100 m	Chinese Taipei; Yu-syuan Tseng	China; Xuechao Dong	Japan; Shunta Nakamae
200 m	China; Xuechao Dong	Not awarded	Not awarded
800 m	South Korea; Dongheon Seol	South Korea; Youngcheol Kim	Not awarded
1,500 m	South Korea; Seonho Lim	South Korea; Seongji Gaa-ng	South Korea; Dongheon Seol
Discus throw	China; Xuechao Dong	India; Lambadi Varthyavath Gopalnaik	Not awarded
Hammer throw	Mongolia; Purevsurev Gansukh	Not awarded	Not awarded
Javelin throw	Mongolia; Purevsurev Gansukh	Not awarded	Not awarded
Shot put	India; Lambadi Varthyavath Gopalnaik	Not awarded	Not awarded
Long jump	Japan; Shunta Nakamae	Not awarded	Not awarded

=== Badminton ===
Event	Gold	Silver	Bronze
Men's Doubles A 35+	India; Stefan Fernandez Vincent; Thong Teron	Indonesia; Fernando Kurniawan; Portugal; José Augusto Maria da Rosa jr.	Not awarded
Men's Doubles A 40+	India; Stefan Fernandez Vincent; Thong Teron	Not awarded	Not awarded

== See also ==
- Asia Pacific Masters Games
- European Masters Games
- Pan-American Masters Games

Preceded by Penang	Asia Pacific Masters Games; North Jeolla; II Asia Pacific Masters Games (2023)	Succeeded by
