= Elizabeth Edmondson =

Australian Paralympic swimmer

Elizabeth Edmondson PLY
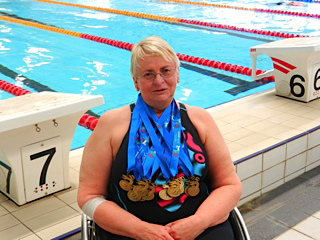
- Edmondson showing her medals won at the 13th Australian Masters Games held in Adelaide in October 2011

Personal information
- Full name: Elizabeth Mary Edmondson
- Nationality: Australia
- Born: 1 July 1950 (age 76) Perth, Western Australia

Sport
- Club: Stadium Masters Swimming Club
Medal record
Women's swimming
Paralympic Games
Gold medal – first place	1964 Tokyo	Class 5 50 m Breaststroke
Gold medal – first place	1964 Tokyo	Class 5 50 m Backstroke
Gold medal – first place	1964 Tokyo	Class 5 Complete 50 m Freestyle
Gold medal – first place	1968 Tel Aviv	Class 4 Incomplete 50 m Freestyle
Gold medal – first place	1968 Tel Aviv	Open 100 m Freestyle
Silver medal – second place	1968 Tel Aviv	Class 4 Incomplete 50 m Backstroke
World Masters Games
Gold medal – first place	2009 Sydney	Women's 50 m Breaststroke 55–69
Gold medal – first place	2009 Sydney	Women's 100 m Breaststroke 55–69
Gold medal – first place	2009 Sydney	Women's 100 m Backstroke 55–69
Gold medal – first place	2009 Sydney	Women's 200 m Breaststroke 55–69
Silver medal – second place	2009 Sydney	Women's 100 m Freestyle 55–69

Elizabeth Mary Edmondson PLY (born 1 July 1950) is an Australian Paralympic competitor and current Australian Masters competitor in swimming. She became a paraplegic after contracting polio as a small child. She won several medals in the 1964 and 1968 Summer Paralympics. She subsequently retired from swimming, only taking up the sport again in 2006 to compete in the 2008 FINA World Masters Championships in Perth.

== Early life ==
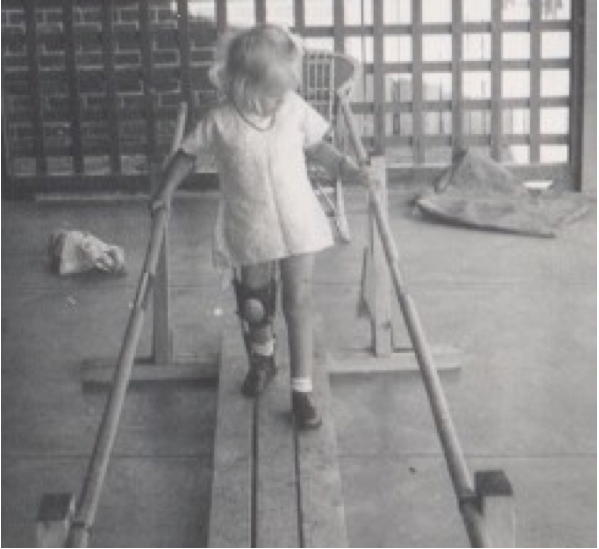
Edmondson learning to walk

Elizabeth Edmondson was born on 1 July 1950 in Perth, Western Australia. On 27 September 1951, at the age of 15 months, she was diagnosed with polio. She spent fifteen months in the hospital. Her father made changes to the house to make it easier for her to get around, including the addition of parallel bars to help her learn to walk. She was given a jelly bean for every length she walked. She started swimming when she was five years old, at Crawley Baths in the Swan River. The first strokes she learnt to swim were the backstroke, dog paddle and freestyle. She learnt to swim without using her legs. She first placed in a swimming competition during a competition in year one at school, where she finished third in a dog paddle swim.

Her first calliper did not allow her to bend her knee. She was excited to receive her first calliper that allowed her knee to bend when she was ten years old. Edmondson had other issues with footwear as a youngster. As her feet grew, she outgrew her custom-made footwear. To extend the life of her shoes, the toes were cut out of them to provide more space for her own toes.

== Competitive career ==
=== Beginnings ===
Tony suggested I joined his Swimming Squad at Beatty Park, which I did. One day Tony came up to me and said "You have just broken a world record."

— Elizabeth Edmondson

When Edmonson was 14, her coach told her she had broken a world record while swimming at Beatty Park as a member of the Swimming Squad. To qualify for the 1964 Summer Paralympics, she competed at the Third Australian Paraplegic Games held in Adelaide, South Australia. At the Australian Paraplegic Games in 1964, she broke a world record and a Commonwealth record. She won a gold medal in the 50m backstroke class e event with a time of 51.8 seconds, 15.2 seconds faster than the previous Commonwealth record time that she beat. The event was the Australian qualifying competition for the 1964 Summer Paralympics.

Around the time that Elizabeth was starting to prepare for the Paralympics, she was a student at St Hilda's Anglican School for Girls, a member of the West Perth Swimming Club, and an avid surfer. Edmondson put her surfing on hold to spend more time training.

=== Paralympics ===
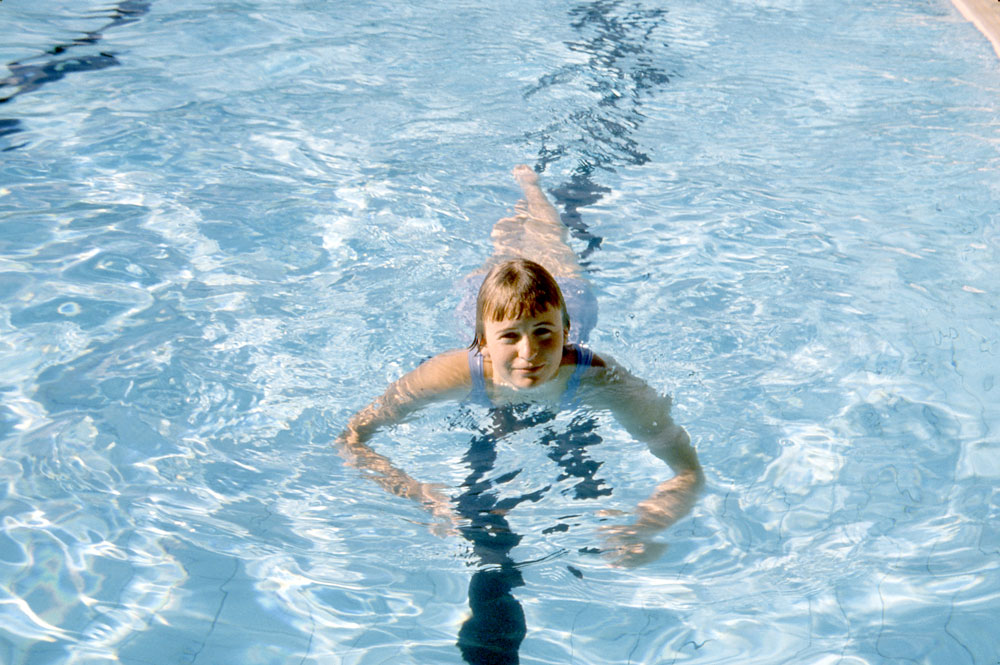
Elizabeth Edmondson training at Beatty Park pool aged 14

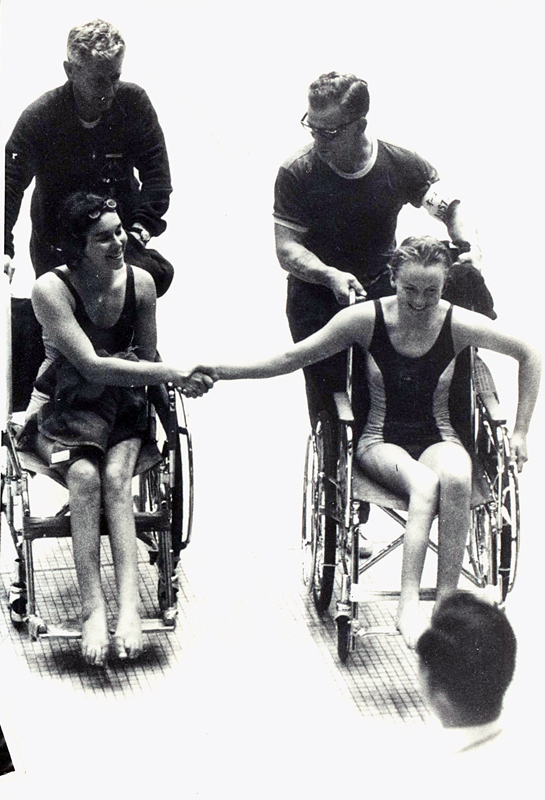
Australian Paralympic Team members Daphne Ceeney (now Hilton) and Elizabeth Edmondson shake hands after Edmondson won gold and Ceeney silver in the 50m prone swimming event at the 1964 Tokyo Paralympic Games. They are pushed by Kevin Betts (Ceeney) and 'Johnno' Johnston (Edmondson)

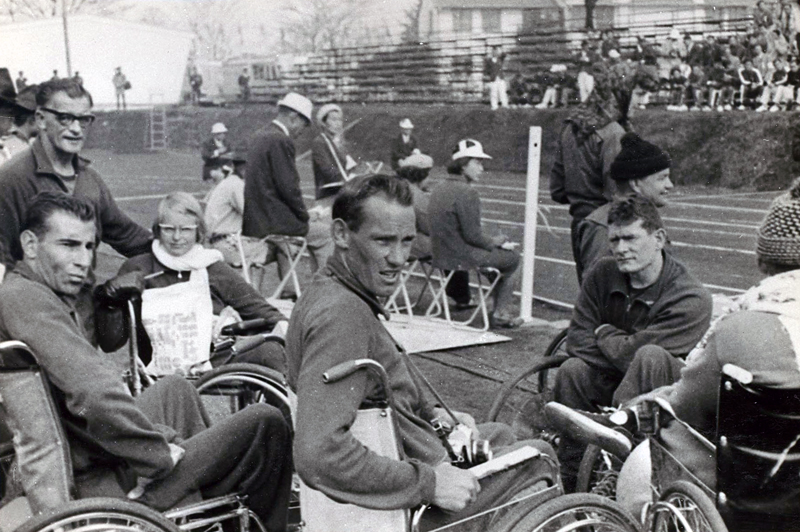
Australian Paralympic Team members in the in-field at the athletics during the 1964 Tokyo Paralympic Games. From left (seated) Frank Ponta, team official John Johnston, Elizabeth Edmondson, unknown and Bill Mather-Brown

Swimming allowed me to move through the water with a certain amount of grace and my disability seemed to disappear in the dimensions of the pool. It got me physically fit, which was a big plus. I enjoyed the competition, the travel and most of all people I met became firm friends. Sport has meant a great deal to me.

— Elizabeth Edmondson

At the age of 14 years and 4 months, Edmondson was an Australian Paralympic competitor. She was the youngest competitor at the 1964 Summer Paralympics in Tokyo among athletes from all nations. She was the youngest Paralympic gold medallist for Australia for 48 years, until Maddison Elliott won a bronze medal at the 2012 London Paralympics. She won three gold medals in the 1964 Summer Paralympics in the following events: the women's class 5 50-metre breaststroke with a world record time of 1.04.6; women's class 5 50-metre backstroke with a world record time of 0.50.8; women's class 5 complete 50-metre freestyle with a world record time of 0.39.7. At the conclusion of the 1964 Games, Edmondson's parents acknowledged that swimming had greatly helped their daughter, but felt that she needed to quit the sport and concentrate on her education because swimming would not provide her with standing in life. After the 1964 games, Edmondson returned home and prepared for school exams.

Edmondson and Lorraine Dodd met Queen Elizabeth The Queen Mother at a garden party hosted at Government House when she visited Perth in 1966. Edmondson did not compete in the 1966 Commonwealth Paraplegic Games, due to difficulty finding funding to go to Jamaica, a plight common to many Western Australian athletes.

Edmondson won a gold medal at the 1968 Summer Paralympics in Tel Aviv in the 50-metre freestyle class 4 incomplete swimming event with a world record time of 0.44.1 and a gold medal in the 100-metre open freestyle swim event with a world record time of 1.33.0. She also won a silver medal in Women's 50m Backstroke class 4 incomplete in a time of 52.3.

Edmondson competed with limited mobility in the water, during the Paralympics and the rest of her swimming career: She could only use her arms and shoulders to move through the water. Edmondson's swimming coach, Tony Howson, claimed that her swimming times were similar to those of able-bodied girls of the same age. She stopped competing after the 1968 Games for financial reasons, and was employed at Telstra.

=== Masters swimming ===
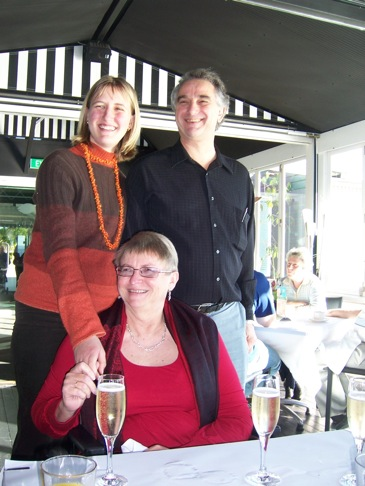
Elizabeth Edmondson (seated) at her daughter's 21st birthday.

I was diagnosed with breast cancer and underwent a lumpectomy. After surgery, I wrote to my friends and told them I now had one concave and one convex breast. One friend then asked "Does that mean you will swim round in circles?" Luckily, when I resumed swimming in early 2009 I was still able to swim in a straight line!

— Elizabeth Edmondson

In 2006, she started to participate in competitive swimming again when she joined the Stadium Masters Swimming Club. In 2008, she qualified for the FINA World Masters Championships and swam a personal best time in the 800m Freestyle. From 2007 to 2009, she competed in several swimming events in a variety of strokes and distances around Australia in the women's 55–59 age group. In October 2007, at the 11th Australian Masters Games, she won 7 individual gold medals and a 1 gold in a relay as a disabled swimmer. She also won a bronze medal in a member of a team in an able bodied relay event.

In February 2009, she swam in the 12th Australian Masters Games and won 7 individual gold medals and 2 gold for relay events as a disabled swimmer .

At the 2009 World Masters Games in Sydney, she won four gold medals and a silver medal in the age group 55 to 69 years.

Edmondson competed at the 2010 Australian National Masters Swimming Championships, held in Launceston, Tasmania. She competed in twelve individual events, and set eleven individual personal records. Her travel to the event was paid for by Wheelchair Sports WA through the Sir George Bedbrook Scholarship fund.

Edmondson competed at the 2011 X111 Australian Masters Games held in Adelaide, South Australia. She competed as a disabled swimmer in six individual events and four relays and won ten gold medals. Edmondson competed at the 2013 X1V Australian Masters Games held in Geelong, Victoria. She competed as a disabled swimmer in seven individual events and two relays and won nine gold medals.

Edmondson swam in the British Long Distance Swimming Association's One Hour Postal Swim from 2009 to 2012. She is also a qualified swimming marshall.

== Recognition ==
Edmondson was awarded the Australian Sports Medal in 2000, in recognition of her work as a swimmer. Edmondson was inducted into the Swimming Western Australia Hall of Fame in 2008. In 2009, Edmondson was inducted into the Wheelchair Sports WA Hall of Fame. Edmondson was awarded a Certificate of Commendation in 2012 by Masters Swimming Western Australia for her services to Masters Swimming.

In 2018 she became the first inductee into the Swimming WA Hall of Legends recognising "outstanding swimming performances at an international level... deemed to have inspired the nation and to have established the name of the athlete, their State and their country on the world stage."

In 2024, Edmondson was inducted into Australian Paralympic Hall of Fame

== Personal life ==
Edmondson has a daughter from a marriage that ended in divorce. In December 2008, Edmondson was diagnosed with breast cancer. Her treatment involved having a lumpectomy.
