= 2018 Asia Pacific Masters Games =

I Asia Pacific Masters Games
- Host city: Penang, Malaysia
- Motto: Beyond the Games
- Athletes: 5564 from 67 nations
- Events: 22 sports
- Opening: 8 September 2018
- Closing: 15 September 2018
- Opened by: Abdul Rahman Abbas; Governor of Penang
- Main venue: City Stadium, George Town
- Website: Asia Pacific Masters Games Penang 2018

The 2018 Asia Pacific Masters Games (Malay: Sukan Masters Asia Pasifik 2018), the inaugural edition of the Asia Pacific Masters Games, also known as Penang 2018, was held in the Malaysian state of Penang from 7 to 15 September 2018. Organised by the International Masters Games Association (IMGA), it is the first ever Masters Games for the Asia-Pacific region.

The multi-sport event is open to participants of all abilities and most ages – the minimum age criterion ranges between 25 and 35 years depending on the sport. There are no competition qualification requirements apart from the age requirement and membership in that sport's governing body.

== Host city ==
Penang was selected as the host of the inaugural edition of the Asia Pacific Masters Games during a bidding process in Nice, France in 2015.

== Venues ==
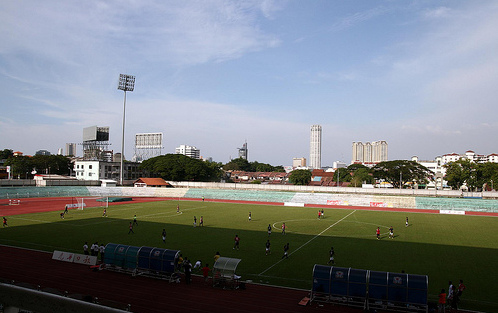
The City Stadium in George Town

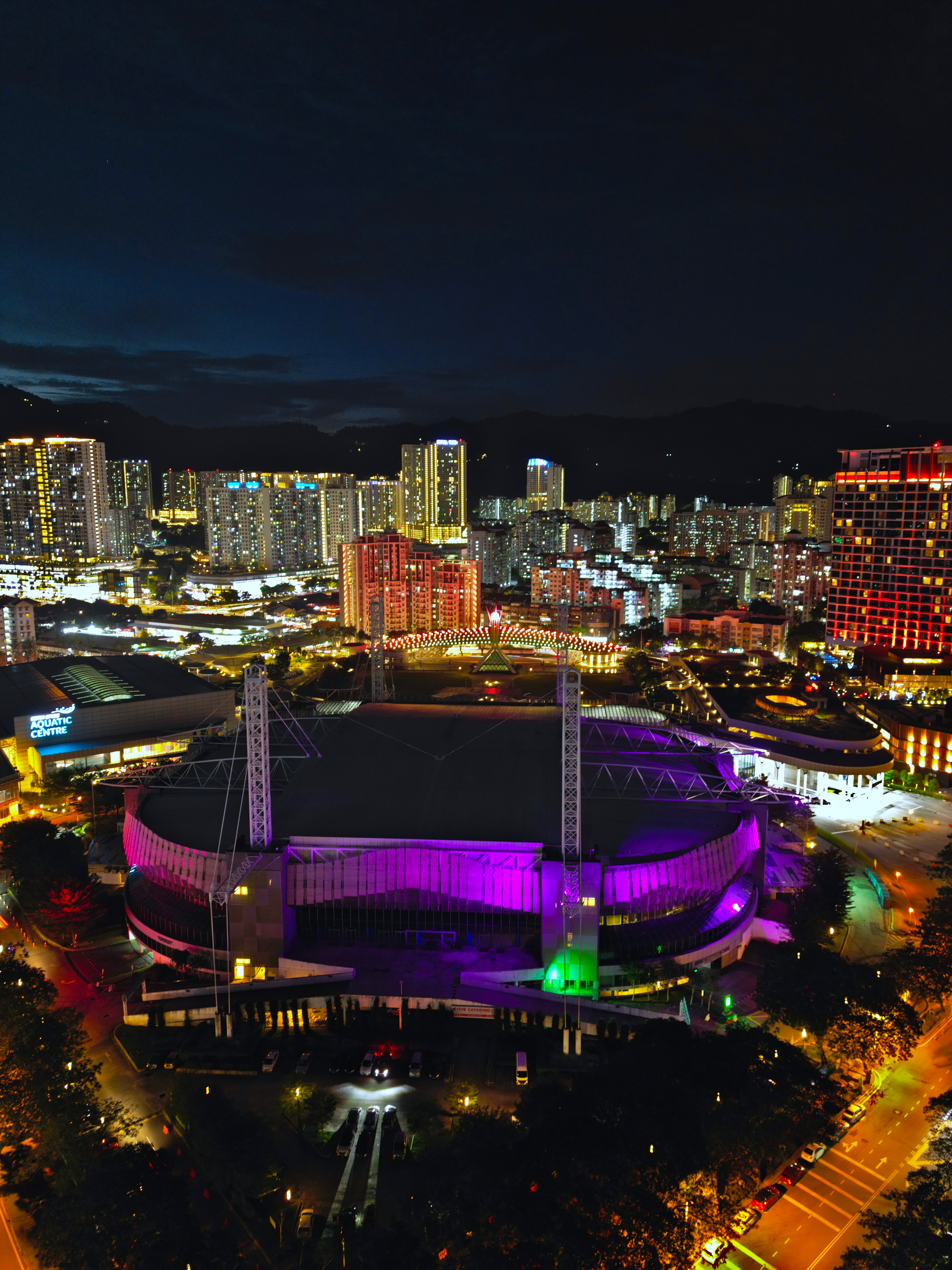
Setia SPICE served as the venue for the closing ceremony.

Mascot of the 2018 Asia Pacific Masters Games

18 venues within Penang's four districts were utilised in the Asia Pacific Masters Games. Most of the venues for the event are situated around Penang's capital city, George Town on Penang Island.

=== Northeast Penang Island ===
1. City Stadium-Athletics (Track and field), Opening ceremony
2. Downtown UNESCO Zone-Cycling (Criterium), Athletics (Half marathon)
3. Gurney Drive to Teluk Bahang-Cycling (Road race)
4. Penang Macallum Street Table Tennis Training Centre-Table tennis
5. Residency Road Primary School-Archery
6. Penang Sports Club-Tennis
7. Penang Rifle Club-Shooting
8. Hard Rock Hotel-Volleyball (beach)
9. Dumbar Hill Penang Water Supply Corporation Badminton Hall-Badminton
10. Nicol David International Squash Centre-Squash
11. Universiti Sains Malaysia (Island Campus)-Netball, Softball, Football, Hockey, Tennis, Volleyball (Indoor)
12. Penang Golf Club, Bukit Jambul-Golf
13. Relau City Sports Complex-Swimming
14. Relau Agro Agriculture Centre-Cycling (Mountain bike)

=== Southwest Penang Island ===
- Setia SPICE-Basketball, Lion dance, Pencak silat, Taekwondo, Wushu, Closing ceremony

=== Central Seberang Perai ===
- Mega Lanes Bowling Centre-Bowling
- Seberang Perai Arena-Weightlifting

=== South Seberang Perai ===
- Bukit Jawi Golf Resort-Golf

== Emblem ==
The emblem consisted of four strokes of pink, blue, sky blue and yellow represents the four spirits of sportsmanship - fairness, discipline, courage and perseverance.

== Mascot ==
CUN the cat, symbolizing "Capable, United and Noble", was the official mascot of the 2018 Games.

== Sports ==
The inaugural edition of the Asia Pacific Masters Games in 2018 will include 22 sports.

- Archery (16) - 125 participants from 12 countries
- Athletics (467) - 1300 participants from 37 countries
- Badminton (138) - 538 participants from 21 countries
- Cycling (43) - 466 participants from 13 countries
- Golf (18) - 107 participants from 9 countries
- Pencak silat (38) - 95 participants from 5 countries
- Shooting (2) - 52 participants from 3 countries
- Squash (61) - 111 participants from 13 countries
- Swimming (500) - 306 participants from 27 countries
- Table tennis (96) - 277 participants from 16 countries
- Taekwondo (25) - 69 participants from 9 countries
- Tennis (69) - 131 participants from 21 countries
- Tenpin bowling (80) - 135 participants from 7 countries
- Weightlifting (49) - 83 participants from 14 countries
- Wushu (70) - 197 participants from 17 countries

Team Sports:

- Basketball (204) - 245 participants from 9 countries
- Football (152) - 484 participants from 12 countries
- Hockey (162) - 157 participants from 9 countries
- Lion dance (40) - 110 participants from 8 countries
- Netball (28) - 138 participants from 7 countries
- Softball (30) - 109 participants from 3 countries
- Volleyball (150) - 199 participants from 15 countries
- Note: Volleyball consist of Beach Volleyball too.

== Results ==
1. Archery:
2. Athletics: https://d3tfdru9q5sbcz.cloudfront.net/2019/11/APMG-2018-Athletics.pdf
3. Badminton: https://d3tfdru9q5sbcz.cloudfront.net/2019/11/APMG-2018-Badminton.pdf
4. Basketball: https://d3tfdru9q5sbcz.cloudfront.net/2020/09/APMG-2018-Basketball.pdf
5. Beach volleyball: https://d3tfdru9q5sbcz.cloudfront.net/2020/09/APMG-2018-Beach-Volleyball-All-Results.pdf
6. Cycling:
7. Football:
8. Golf:
9. Hockey: https://d3tfdru9q5sbcz.cloudfront.net/2019/11/APMG-2018-Field-Hockey.pdf
10. Lion dance:
11. Netball: https://d3tfdru9q5sbcz.cloudfront.net/2019/11/APMG-2018-Netball.pdf
12. Pencak silat:
13. Shooting:
14. Softball:
15. Squash: https://d3tfdru9q5sbcz.cloudfront.net/2019/11/APMG-2018-SQUASH-final-results.pdf
16. Swimming: https://d3tfdru9q5sbcz.cloudfront.net/2019/11/APMG-2018-Swimming.pdf
17. Table tennis: https://d3tfdru9q5sbcz.cloudfront.net/2019/11/APMG-2018-Table-Tennis.pdf
18. Taekwondo:
19. Tennis:
20. Ten-pin bowling:
21. Volleyball: https://d3tfdru9q5sbcz.cloudfront.net/2020/09/APMG-2018-INDOOR-VB-RESULT-All-Results.pdf
22. Weightlifting: https://d3tfdru9q5sbcz.cloudfront.net/2020/09/All-Weightlifting.pdf
23. Wushu:

== Medals ==
Source page 70 and 77: There should not be any medal table or results in the article as Master games are not like the Olympics. As mentioned in the rules of IMGA, there are no national delegation and all participants compete individually.

Total 5,846 Podium medals (G, S, B) and 1,180 finishers medals (in Road cycling and road athletics events) in all age group.

1. 2438 Gold
2. 1850 Silver
3. 1558 Bronze
4. 5846 Total

Medal table
Sports	Gold	Silver	Bronze	Total
Archery	16	15	13	44
Athletics	467	467	467	1401
Badminton	138	128	117	383
Basketball	204	72	48	324
Cycling	43	39	31	113
Football	152	114	57	323
Golf	18	14	14	46
Hockey	162	126	126	414
Lion dance	40	40	40	120
Netball	28	28	28	84
Pencak silat	38	27	27	92
Shooting	2	2	2	6
Softball	30	60	30	120
Squash	61	50	35	146
Swimming	500	333	261	1094
Table tennis	96	65	53	214
Taekwondo	25	20	15	60
Tennis	69	69	44	182
Ten-pin bowling	80	80	80	240
Volleyball	150	20	10	180
Weightlifting	49	20	10	79
Wushu	70	61	50	181
Total	2438	1850	1558	5846

== Participating nations ==
Below are the countries of origin of the participating athletes. Note that there are no national delegations in Masters Games, as the athletes compete on their own.

=== Summary ===
Source event report page 6 and 75:

A total of 5601 participants:

3328 athletes from Malaysia (59.4%).

2273 athletes from 66 other countries (40.6%).

4,073 men (73%) and 1,528 women (27%).

=== Ages ===
1. Under 20: 25 persons
2. 20-29: 55 persons
3. 30-39: 1346 persons
4. 40-49: 1748 persons
5. 50-59: 1420 persons
6. 60-69: 745 persons
7. 70-79: 220 persons
8. Over 80: 42 persons

=== Top ===
1. Malaysia (3328)
2. India (385)
3. Australia (296)
4. Japan (240)
5. China (179)

=== Asia Pacific ===
==== Asia (30) ====
- Bangladesh (1)
- Bahrain (2)
- Brunei (13)
- China (179)
- Hong Kong (102)
- Indonesia (73)
- India (385)
- Iran (48)
- Japan (240)
- Kazakhstan (20)
- South Korea (52)
- Lebanon (2)
- Macau (12)
- Malaysia (host) (3328)
- Mongolia (135)
- Maldives (35)
- Pakistan (1)
- Philippines (52)
- North Korea (5)
- Saudi Arabia (2)
- Singapore (113)
- Sri Lanka (64)
- Tajikistan (1)
- Thailand (5)
- Chinese Taipei (22)
- Vietnam (6)
- Uzbekistan (1)

==== Pacific (7) ====
- Australia (296)
- British Indian Ocean Territory (1)
- Guam (6)
- New Caledonia (2)
- Nouméa (1)
- New Zealand (39)
- Papua New Guinea (1)

==== Guest (30) ====
- Argentina (3)
- Azerbaijan (1)
- Brazil (2)
- Belgium (5)
- Canada (11)
- Chile (2)
- Czech Republic (6)
- Colombia (1)
- Denmark (1)
- Egypt (1)
- Estonia (1)
- Finland (4)
- France (4)
- Hungary (31)
- Italy (1)
- Germany (1)
- Great Britain (17)
- Lithuania (5)
- Mexico (2)
- Mali (1)
- Malta (1)
- Netherlands (1)
- South Africa (87)
- Russia (64)
- Trinidad and Tobago (1)
- Scotland (1)
- Slovenia (7)
- Switzerland (18)
- United States (47)
- Ukraine (28)
- Zimbabwe (1)

== Athlete's death ==
On 13 September 2018, Ukrainian football player Oleksandr Shcherbinin died of a heart attack in his hotel room at 6.45 am, after he complained of chest pain and collapsed.

== See also ==
- Asia Pacific Masters Games
- European Masters Games
- Pan-American Masters Games

Preceded by	Asia Pacific Masters Games; Penang; I Asia Pacific Masters Games (2018)	Succeeded by North Jeolla
