= GYF =

GYF or gyf may refer to:

- gyf, ISO 639-3 code for Gungabula, a dialect of the Bidjara language
- GYF domain, a protein family
- Great Yarmouth First, local political party in England
- GYF, Telegraph code for Gongyi South railway station, China
- Gakhar youth welfare, society in Gakhar Chanan, Gujrat, Pakistan
- Global Youth Forum, program of American organization People to People International
- GYF, sports code for French Guiana used in the 2015 European Masters Games
