= Ground golf =

Form of golf invented Japan

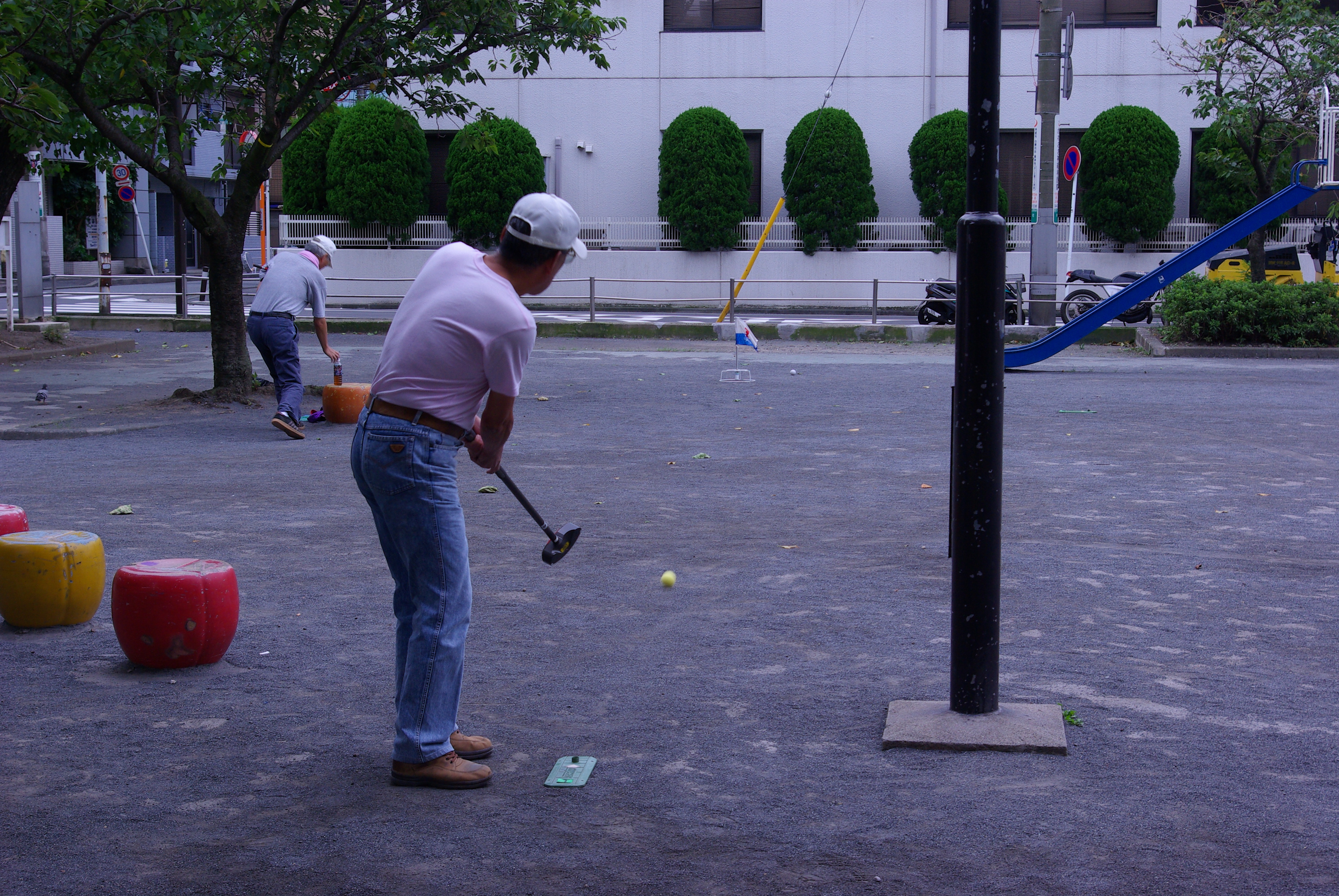
- A ground golf player in a park who has just taken a swing

Presence
- Olympic: No
- Paralympic: No

A man practicing ground golf in a park in Tokyo

Ground golf (グラウンド・ゴルフ, guraundo gorufu) is a form of golf played in a park that was invented in the village of Tomari (now part of Yurihama) in Tottori Prefecture, Japan, in 1982. It is similar to and a forerunner of park golf and is one of Japan's new sports.

The "ground", from the Japanese use of the word guraundo (グラウンド) for "school playground" or "sports ground", emphasizes anyone can play in any place at any time on nearly any surface. Unlike golf and even park golf, ground golf does not use a formal course or require holes (cups). Instead, the ball is hit into a holepost, a basket-like cage at the base of a moveable post.

Aesthetically, ground golf resembles a sport somewhere between golf and croquet. As with golf, the competitive object of the game is to hit the ball, in this case into the holeposts, in the fewest strokes.

The courses have eight holes and a standard course has holes at a distance between 15 and 50 meters. Each player has one ball of his or her own and players take turns hitting. Players tee-off from a manufactured start mat and count the number of strokes taken. To finish a hole, a player's ball must come to rest within the bottom ring of the holepost. This is called a "tomari", named for the village where the sport was invented. There are no restrictions on the time or number of players. Informally, the number of holes and their distances can vary.

The sport has grown in popularity in Japan since its invention as an alternative to gateball for younger senior citizens who may have reacted to the image of gateball as a "silver sport". By 2024 there were three million participants in Japan, with over 155,000 players registered to clubs throughout Japan, and players in other countries from Malaysia, to the Maldives, to Mongolia to Spain.

Standards for the sport are set by the Japan Ground Golf Association and the Japan-based International Ground Golf Federation. The World Masters Games have recognized the sport, and it is scheduled to be played at the 2027 Summer World Masters Games in Kansai, Japan.

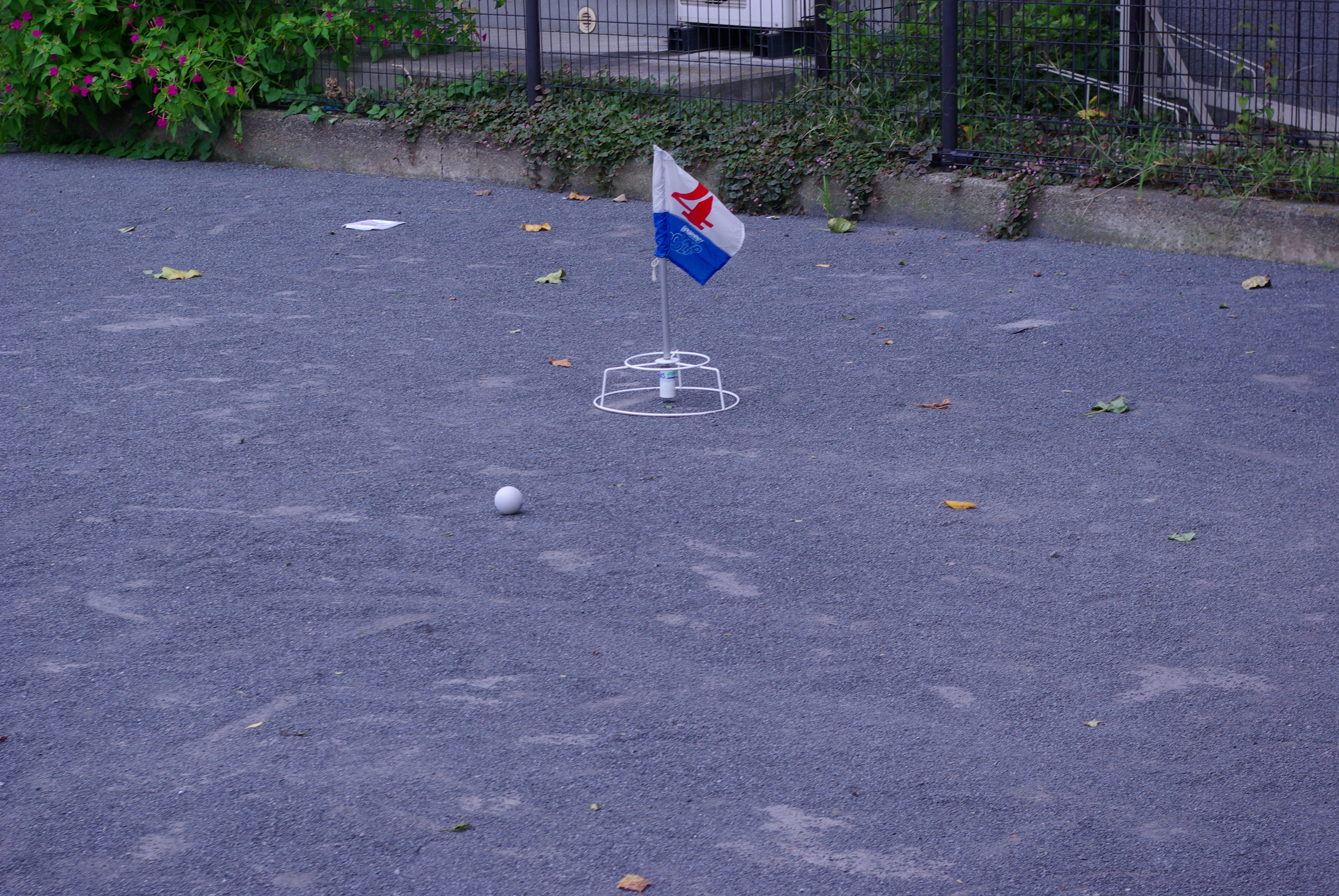
A ground golf ball and a holepost

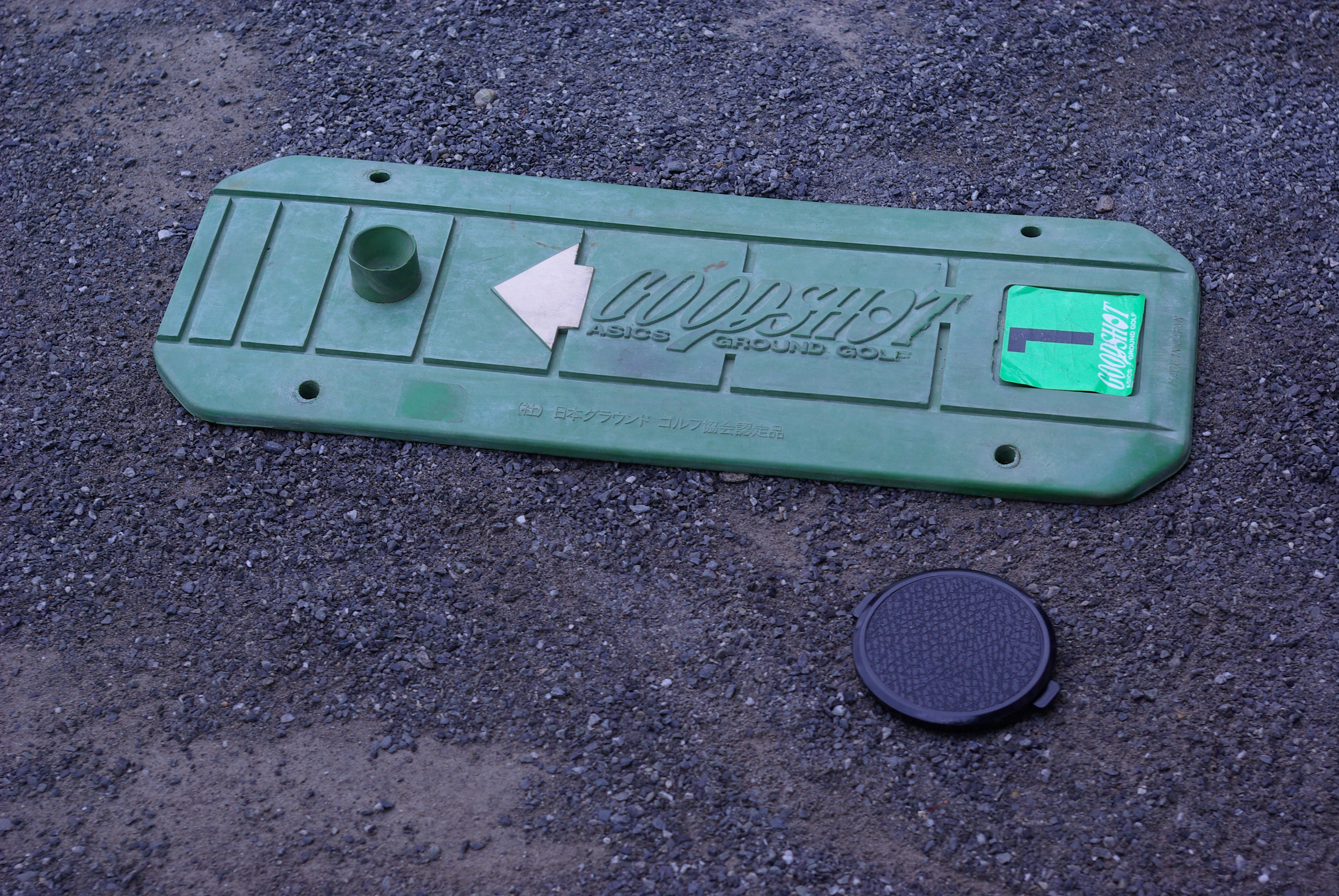
A ground golf start mat

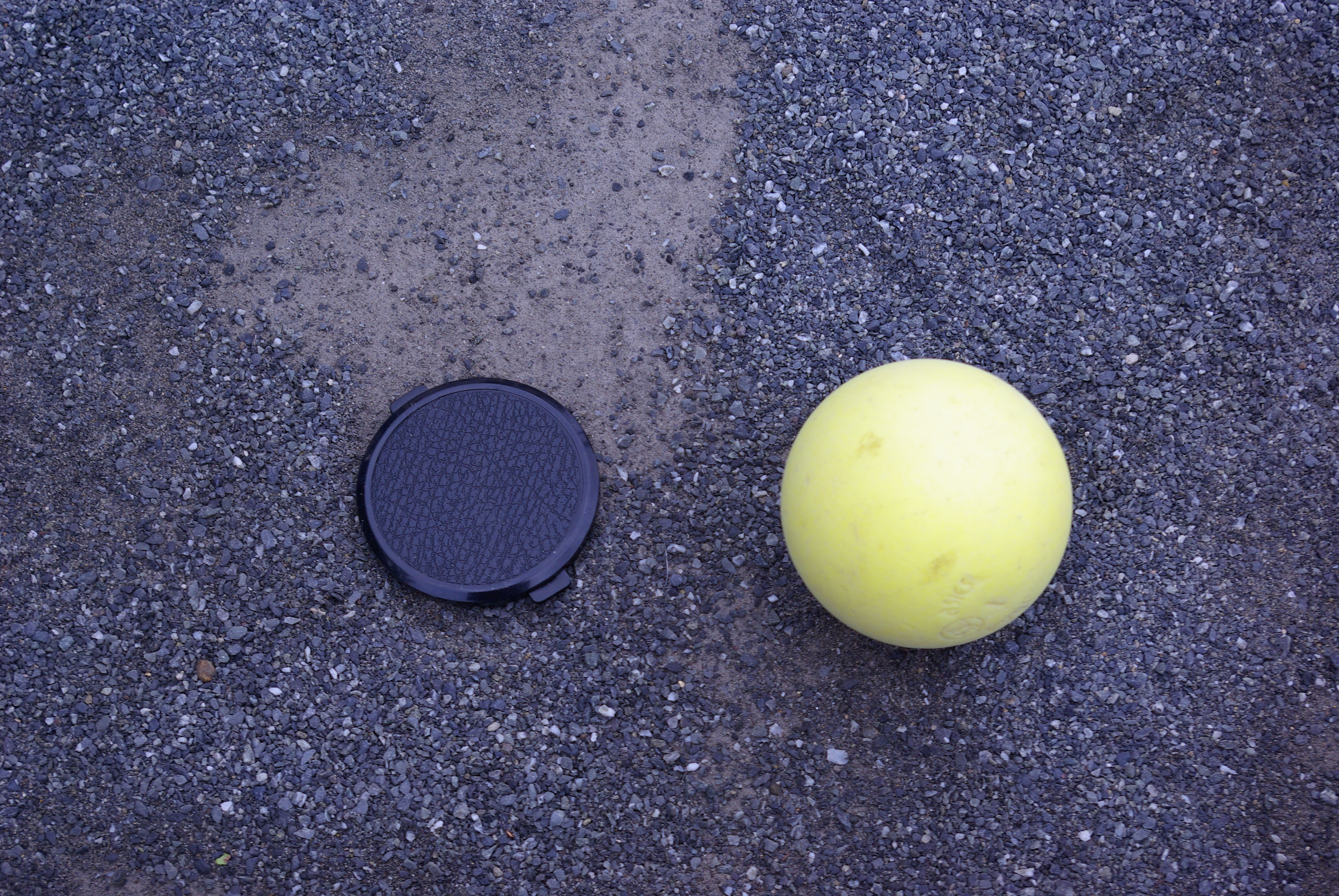
A ground golf ball with a 52 mm camera lens cover for comparison

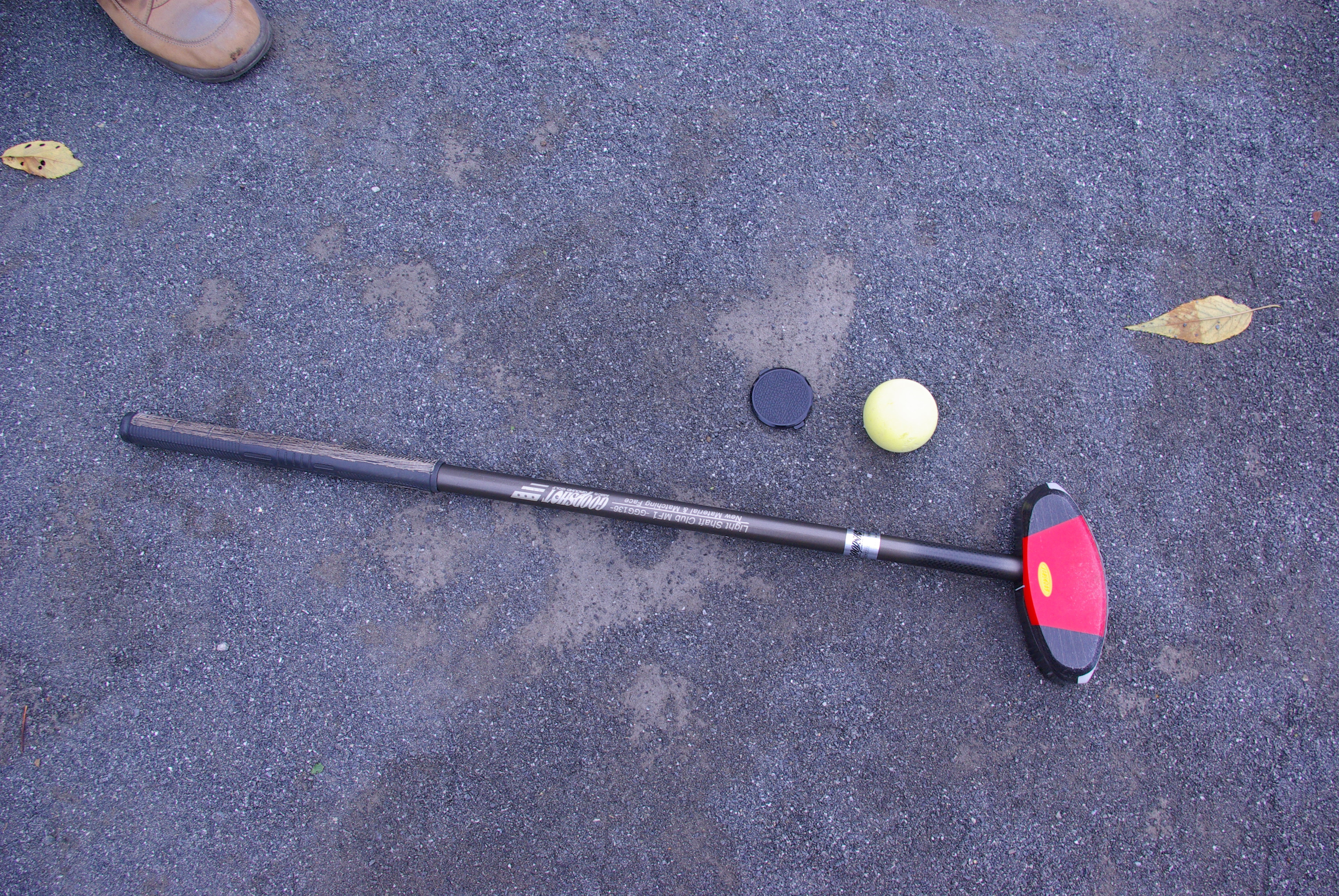
A ground golf ball and club
