= Antonio Maino =

Italian masters athlete (born 1951)

Personal information
- Nationality: Italian
- Born: 23 November 1951 (age 74)

Sport
- Country: Italy
- Sport: Masters athletics
- Event: Throws

Achievements and titles
- Personal best: Javelin throw 43.51 m (1955)
Medal record
European Masters Games
Gold medal – first place	2008 Malmö	Shot put M55
Silver medal – second place	2008 Malmö	Discus throw M55

Antonio Maino (born 23 November 1951) is an Italian masters athlete who won two medals at the European Masters Games.

== Achievements ==
Year	Competition	Venue	Event	Position	Measure	Notes
2008	European Masters Games	(Sweden) Malmö	Shot put M55	1st	12.42 m	
2008	European Masters Games	(Sweden) Malmö	Discus throw M55	2nd	39.00 m	

== See also ==
- List of Italian records in masters athletics
