= Asia Pacific Masters Games =

Regional multi-sport event

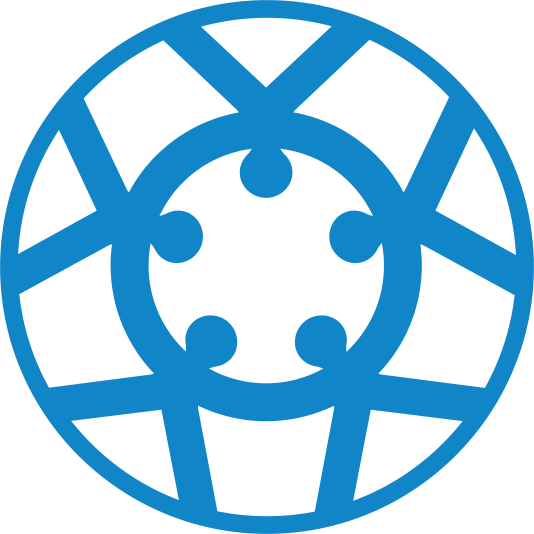
- Purpose: To conduct multi-sport events for sports and disciplines that are contested in the Olympic Games (+ more sports) but for masters
- Frequency: Every 4 years
- Inaugurated: 2018 – Malaysia
- Most recent: 2023 – South Korea
- Next event: 2026 – United Arab Emirates
- Website: imga.ch International Masters Games Association (IMGA)

The Asia Pacific Masters Games is a regional multi-sport event which involves participants from the Asia-Pacific region. Governed by the International Masters Games Association (IMGA), the Asia Pacific Masters Games is open to participants of all abilities and most ages – the minimum age criterion ranges between 25 and 35 years depending on the sport. Participants compete for themselves, instead of their countries. There are no competition qualification requirements apart from the age requirement and membership in that sport's governing body. The Malaysian state of Penang hosted the event's first edition between 8 and 15 September 2018.

== History ==
A bidding process was held in Nice, France in 2015 to select the host cities for the first two editions of the Asia Pacific Masters Games. The Malaysian state of Penang was selected to host the inaugural edition in September 2018.

Rename: 2026 Open Masters Series instead of Asia Pacific Masters Games.

Edition	Year	Host city	Country	Sports	Competitors	Date	Motto	Note
Asia Pacific Masters Games
1	2018	Penang	Malaysia	22	5,564	8 – 15 September	Beyond the Games	
2	2022	North Jeolla	South Korea	26	13,000	12 – 20 May 2023	Enjoy Sports, Play Life	
Regional (Asia Pacific) Open Masters Series
3	2026	Abu Dhabi	United Arab Emirates					

Hosts of the Asia Pacific Masters Games

== Sports ==
=== 2018 (22 Sports) ===
The inaugural edition of the Asia-Pacific Masters Games in 2018 included 22 sports.

- Archery
- Athletics
- Badminton
- Basketball
- Cycling
- Football
- Golf
- Hockey
- Lion dance
- Netball
- Pencak silat
- Shooting
- Softball
- Squash
- Swimming
- Table tennis
- Taekwondo
- Tennis
- Tenpin bowling
- Volleyball
- Weightlifting
- Wushu

=== 2022 (26 Sports) ===
In 2022 (was held in 2023), roller sports, sailing, triathlon, baseball, park golf, gateball, and judo will be added, and lion dance, netball, and pencak silat will be removed.

=== 2026 (37 Sports) ===
37 sports Abu Dhabi 06 - 15 February 2026

31 Usual Sports: Football, Basketball, Volleyball, Judo, Karate, Jiu-Jitsu, Muay Thai, Shooting, Badminton, Weightlifting, Table Tennis, Tennis, Padel, Athletics, Squash, Chess, Cycling, Obstacle Course Racing, Swimming, Golf, Canoeing/Kayaking, Sailing, Orienteering, Triathlon, Bowling, Netball, Rugby, Cricket, Wrestling, Horse Jumping, Archery.

6 Emirati Heritage Sports: Falconry, Endurance Horse Racing, Camel Racing, Dhow Sailing, Al Taba, Diving.

18 Para Sports categories (determination people).

== See also ==
- Asia Masters Athletics Championships
- European Masters Games
- World Masters Games
- Americas Masters Games
