= New sports =

Japanese term for newly designed recreational sports

New sports (ニュースポーツ, nyūsupōtsu) is term used in Japan for a group sports that were newly devised or adapted in the latter half of the 20th century and the early 21st century. First used in 1979, the term refers to sports whose focus is on physical exercise with an emphasis on casual enjoyment as part of recreation, rather than on winning or losing.

Many of those sports, such as footgolf, gateball, speed-ball and teeball are modifications of previously-existing sports or hybrid sports. Some, such as pétanque, kabaddi and darts, are traditional sports popularized beyond their original homelands. Still others, like inline hockey and floorball, have arisen with new technology.

Modifications to existing sports are often designed to expand participation to a wider range of ages and physical strengths and environments. Some of them are adaptive sports or parasports. In Japan, there is an image that many of them are for the elderly. New sports include the following:

- Boccia
- Crossminton
- Darts
- Floorball
- Footgolf
- Freestyle nunchaku
- Frisbee golf
- Gateball
- Ground golf
- Headis
- Indiaca
- Inline hockey
- Kabaddi
- Kin-Ball
- Mölkky
- Pétanque
- Slacklining
- Speed-ball
- Sport blowgun
- Tamburello
- Teeball
- Ultimate frisbee
