= Park golf ball =

Three brightly colored park golf balls

Park golf balls are used in the sport of park golf. They have a weight less than 100 grams (3.5 oz) and diameter of 60 millimetres (2.4 in) and are constructed of durable synthetic resins. They may be translucent or opaque and are manufactured in many different colours. Balls from different manufacturers vary significantly in the way they perform contacting the club, flying through the air and rolling on the grass.

== Types of Balls ==
Park golf balls are divided into three categories based on their construction.

One-piece balls are made of a single kind of plastic resin, shaped into a sphere and hardened. They are the most durable kind of ball but their performance is limited by the properties of the resin. These balls are also the cheapest and often available as rentals at park golf courses.

Two-piece balls have an inner core and outer covering made of different materials. By combining two materials, the advantages of both can be used in the same ball. For example, a ball may have a durable resin core, while the outer layer offers a better feeling to the player hitting the ball. In this way, the two-piece ball improves on the one-piece ball. However, due to the more complicated manufacturing process, they are also more expensive.

Three-piece balls, sometimes called multi-layer balls, are constructed of several different resins and have a non-spherical core. They are difficult to produce and are designed to have a specific characteristic (such as the ability to curve in the air or stop quickly on the green). They are the most expensive balls on the market and currently only made by two companies, Mizuno and Asics.

== Commercial Balls ==
In 2006, the following two- and three-piece ball were available on the market in Japan.

Maker	Name	Construction	Colours	Specific Advantages
Asics	Three-Piece Ball	3-piece	6	Designed for increased control of short shots and putting.
Bridgestone	Thunderbird	2-piece (hollow core)	7	Built for long flights and large curves. High durability.
Dunlop	Park Golf Ball	2-piece	7	A soft outer layer provides a snappy contact and greater control.
Hatachi	Crystal Ball	2-piece	7	Designed for maximum carry and flying distance.
Hatachi	Crystal Ball Light	2-piece	4	An ultra-light ball (80 grams) for parkers without much power in their swing.
Mizuno	Two-Piece Ball	2-piece	5	A soft ball with high resilience.
Mizuno	Cross-shot	3-piece	5	Designed using golf-ball technology for greater control.
Naniwa	Birth Rainbow	2-piece	6	A medium density ball that rolls true.
Nittax	Two-Piece Ball	2-piece	5	Innovative resin provides a high resilience. Carries well.
SPG	Magnum F	2-piece	8	Performs well in rain and deep rough. Flies straight.
SPG	Magnum G	2-piece	8	Designed for high-end parkers. Can be curved in flight.
Tabata	TPG1002 Mustone	2-piece	5	Provides greater feeling off the club face.
