= 2019 European Masters Games =

- Dates: 26 July – 4 August
- Host city: Turin, Italy
- Participation: 7,505 athletes

The 2019 European Masters Games was the fourth edition of the multi-sport event for masters sport, taking place between 26 July – 4 August 2019 in Turin in Italy. It featured 28 sports, mostly for people aged 35 and above, although some disciplines allowed younger athletes to participate.

== Sports ==
- Archery
- Athletics
- Badminton
- Basketball
- Beach volleyball
- Canoe kayak
- Shooting Clay Target
- Shooting Pistol&Rifle
- Cycling
- Dancesport
- Fencing
- Field Hockey
- Floorball
- Football
- Futsal
- Golf
- Handball
- Judo
- Karate
- Paddle
- Rowing
- Softball
- Swimming
- Taekwondo
- Tennis
- Triathlon and Duathlon
- Volleyball
- Weightlifting

=== Cancel sports ===
- Climbing
- Orienteering
- Wakeboard

=== Paralympic Sports ===
Disabled athletes were allowed to participate in the disciplines of the archery, athletics, and swimming.

== Results ==
- https://www.torino2019emg.org/en/results/
- https://web.archive.org/web/20191103111502/https://www.torino2019emg.org/en/results/

== Results ==
- https://torino2019emg.org/en/
