= 2011 European Masters Games =

The 2011 European Masters Games is the second edition of the multi-sport event for masters sport, scheduled to take place between 10–20 September 2011 in the areas of Lignano Sabbiadoro and Friuli-Venezia Giulia in Italy.

It featured 21 sports, mostly for people aged 35 and above, although some disciplines will allow younger athletes to participate.

== Sports ==
https://www.imga.ch/assets/Uploads/Reports/EMG2008-Final-Report.pdf

=== Main ===
https://web.archive.org/web/20131218080033/http://www.lignano2011.it/index.php?op=2028

- Archery (40 to 60)
- Athletics (30 to 100)
- Beach rugby
- Beach volleyball
- Canoe kayak
- Clay pigeon shooting (30 to 70)
- Cycling
- Dancesport
- Fencing
- Futsal
- Golf
- Handball
- Judo
- Karate
- Orienteering
- Rowing
- Sailing
- Taekwondo
- Tennis
- Triathlon
- Weightlifting

=== Paralympic Sports ===
https://web.archive.org/web/20131218075942/http://www.lignano2011.it/index.php?op=1472

ATHLETICS

Age classes Paralympics: Men and Woman:30 over =Born in 1981 or before.

Competition Specialities Paralympics (Deambulants, Wheelchairs and sport blinds).

Men and Woman: 100mt; 200mt; shot put; discus. (According to IPC-IAAF rules)

CANOE - KAYAK

Age classes Paralympics: Men and Woman: Open.

Competition Categories Paralympics: Men and Woman – 2: (K1, V1).

Competition Categories Paralympics: Men and Woman – 3: (A, TA, LTA).

Distances Paralympics: Men and Woman - 1: mt. 200.

CYCLING

Age Classes for Paralympics: Men and Woman - 1 : 30 over.

Competition Specialities for Paralympics: Men and Woman – 2: (Handbyke and Tandem for blinds)

CLAY TARGET

Age classes Paralympics: Men and Woman: 30 over = born in 1981 or before.

Competition Specialities Paralympics (Deambulants, Wheelchairs).

Men and Woman

JUDO

Age classes Paralympics: Men and Woman: Age-classes are open.

All athletes must be born in 1981 or before.

Competition Categories (Blinds).

Men - 4: kg. 66, kg. 73, kg. 81, kg .+ 81.

Woman - 4: kg. 52, kg. 57, kg. 63, kg. +63.

ORIENTEERING

Age Classes : Open elite and Paralympics M+ W+: 35 over.

Competition Specialities: Men and Woman - 1: TRAIL-O.

HANDBALL

Age Classes: (Deafs).

Men - 1: 35 over.

Woman - 1: 33 over.

Composition of teams: Maximum: 16, Minimum: 8 athletes for each team.

ARCHERY

Age classes Paralympics: Men and Woman – 1: 40 over.

Distances: Men and Woman - 1: Olympic: mt. 60.

Men and Woman - 1: Compound: mt. 50.

== Results ==
- https://www.imga.ch/en/data/27
- https://www.imga.ch/assets/Uploads/Reports/EMG-Lignano-2011-Final-Report.pdf
- https://www.imga.ch/assets/Uploads/Results/All-Archery-Results.pdf
- https://www.imga.ch/assets/Uploads/Results/ATHLETICS.pdf
- https://www.imga.ch/assets/Uploads/Results/All-Beach-Volley-Results.pdf
- https://www.imga.ch/assets/Uploads/Results/All-Cycling-Results.pdf
- https://www.imga.ch/assets/Uploads/Results/DANCE-SPORT.pdf
- https://www.imga.ch/assets/Uploads/Results/FUTSAL.pdf
- https://www.imga.ch/assets/Uploads/Results/20110915-08-GOLF-Netto-Udine.pdf
- https://www.imga.ch/assets/Uploads/Results/HANDBALL.pdf
- https://www.imga.ch/assets/Uploads/Results/JUDO.pdf
- https://www.imga.ch/assets/Uploads/Results/2011-12-orienteering-results-merged.pdf
- https://www.imga.ch/assets/Uploads/Results/All-Rowing-Results.pdf
- https://www.imga.ch/assets/Uploads/Results/All-Sailing-Results.pdf
- https://www.imga.ch/assets/Uploads/Results/TEAKWONDO.pdf
- https://www.imga.ch/assets/Uploads/Results/Triathlon-Results-Book.pdf
- https://www.imga.ch/assets/Uploads/Results/ALL-WEIGHTLIFTING-RESULTS-2011.pdf
- http://websites.sportstg.com/select_node.cgi?cID=2209&p=1
- http://websites.sportstg.com/assoc_page.cgi?assoc=4653&pID=1
- http://websites.sportstg.com/assoc_page.cgi?assoc=4655&pID=1
- http://websites.sportstg.com/assoc_page.cgi?assoc=4660&pID=1
- http://websites.sportstg.com/assoc_page.cgi?assoc=4664&pID=1
- http://websites.sportstg.com/assoc_page.cgi?assoc=4667&pID=1
- http://websites.sportstg.com/assoc_page.cgi?assoc=4682&pID=1
- http://websites.sportstg.com/assoc_page.cgi?assoc=4671&pID=1
- http://websites.sportstg.com/assoc_page.cgi?assoc=4673&pID=1
- http://websites.sportstg.com/assoc_page.cgi?assoc=4654&pID=1
- http://websites.sportstg.com/assoc_page.cgi?assoc=4656&pID=1
- http://websites.sportstg.com/assoc_page.cgi?assoc=4670&pID=1
- http://websites.sportstg.com/assoc_page.cgi?assoc=4679&pID=1
- http://websites.sportstg.com/assoc_page.cgi?assoc=4676&pID=1
- http://websites.sportstg.com/assoc_page.cgi?assoc=4665&pID=1
- http://websites.sportstg.com/assoc_page.cgi?assoc=4674&pID=1
- http://websites.sportstg.com/assoc_page.cgi?c=1-8696-0-0-0&sID=228027
- http://websites.sportstg.com/assoc_page.cgi?c=1-8696-0-0-0&sID=228031
- https://www.cpsa.co.uk/userfiles/files/EMG2011.pdf
