= Gakhar Chanan, Gujrat =

Coordinates: 32.692889°N 73.763629°E

Gakhar is farming in Gujrat district in the Punjab province of Pakistan. The village is located at 32.692889 (latitude) and 73.763629 (longitude) on the Kharian-Dinga link road. The most direct route to the village is by traveling southwest from the city of Kharian.

The residents of Gakhar are predominantly from Gujjar clans with the Phand tribe making up the majority of the village. Other clans within the village are the Mian, Gorsi, and Kohli clans.

The main source of income for the village residents is agriculture, although many villagers residing abroad, mainly in Europe and various other parts of the world, send remittance to their families. Gakhar has two big mosques and a small one at the stop of Gakhar. Gakhar also has a government hospital and government school as well as a number of private schools in the neighboring village Chanan.

Modern-day facilities are present in Gakhar today including electricity and gas. It also has its own sewer system running through Gakhar. Gakhar also has access to canal water which comes from Mangla Dam.

Gakhar is also known in the area for its Rent a car business, located on the main Dinga road. It holds up to 25 cars which can be pre-booked or self-driven. The majority of the car owners are residents of Gakhar or neighboring villages.

The villagers of Gakhar are political. There is GYF Gakhar youth welfare society has 6 members and these members all work hard for the welfare of the village.

Habib Bank of Pakistan is also present in Gakhar as well as a handful of shops.

It also holds its own Adara a place which the whole village uses in certain times of need, mainly deaths. It was built with all the villagers contributing towards its build.

The main streets which run through Gakhar are in excellent order with vehicles passing freely from one side to the other.

Recently residents of Gakhar formed an association whereby members contribute a fixed amount each month into a fund which in turn is used to spend money within Gakhar. Over 100 members mainly in the UK meet up regularly in Burnley to discuss issues and needs of the village. Varies different projects have been carried out like the cleaning of gutters which takes place every week bus stops solar lights and varies other projects have been carried out.

The main towns near Gakhar are Dinga which is located about 7 km away and Kharian located about 17 km away.

== Gujjar clans who reside in Gakhar ==
- Phand
- Koli
- Mian
- Gorsi
- khatana

== Mehfil-E-Naat ==
The first Mehfil-E-Naat took place in Gakhar; on that occasion numerous speakers come and contributed their teachings at the Mehfil. The main speaker on the day was Makhdom Jaffer Hussain Qureshi from Multan.
