= 2009 World Masters Games =

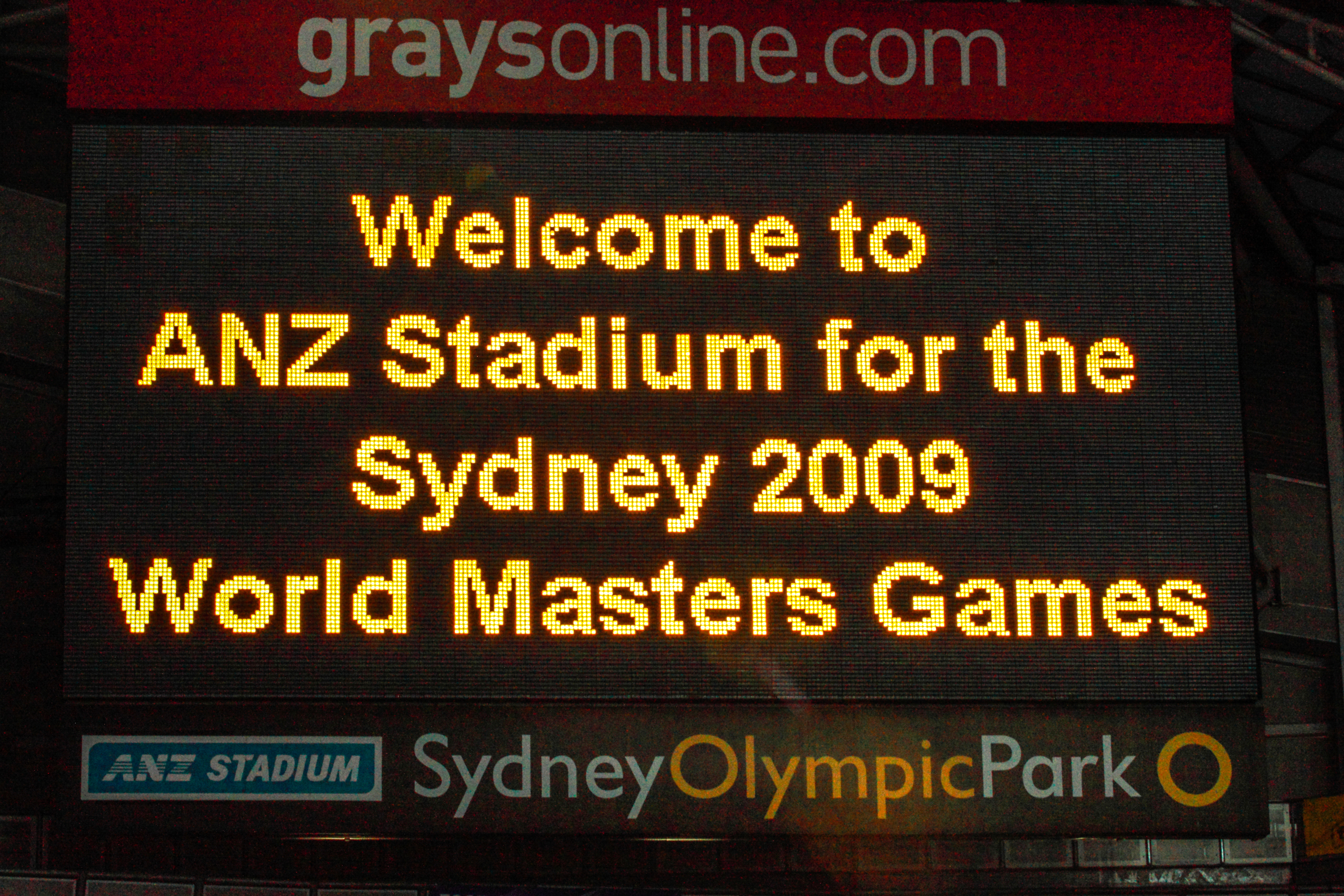
Sign welcoming attendees to the opening ceremony

The Sydney 2009 World Masters Games, the seventh edition of a four–yearly event that has developed into the world's largest multi-sport event in terms of participation, was held from 10 October to 18 October 2009 in Sydney, the largest city in Australia and the capital city of New South Wales.

Open to sportspeople of all abilities and most ages – the minimum age criterion ranges between 25 and 35 years depending on the sport – the Sydney 2009 World Masters Games included competitors from more than 100 countries who competed in 28 sports.

Many of the Sydney 2009 World Masters Games sports competitions took place at 2000 Olympic Games venues, something that was not the case to any significant degree at any of the previous six World Masters Games. The Sydney International Regatta Centre, the Sydney International Shooting Centre and several Sydney Olympic Park facilities, including the Sydney Olympic Park Aquatic Centre, the Sydney Olympic Park Archery Centre and the Sydney Olympic Park Athletic Centre to list just three, were just some of the sites at which Sydney 2009 World Masters Games competitors competed.

== Sports ==
The Sydney 2009 World Masters Games featured 28 sports – 15 core sports that are mandatory for all events under the auspices of the International Masters Games Association and 13 optional sports that the Sydney 2009 World Masters Games Organising Committee proposed to the International Masters Games Association.

Sport	Minimum age	Venue(s)
Archery	30	Sydney Olympic Park Archery Centre (target), The Armory (field), Five Dock Leisure Centre (indoor), to be advised (clout)
Athletics	30	Sydney Olympic Park Athletic Centre ^{Map}
Badminton	35	Sydney Olympic Park Sports Centre ^{Map}
Baseball	35	Blacktown Olympic Park Baseball Complex, Corbin Reserve
Basketball	30	Hills Sports Stadium, Bankstown Basketball Stadium, Menai Indoor Sports Centre, Penrith Valley Regional Sports Centre, Sutherland Leisure Centre, Thornleigh Indoor Sports Centre
Canoeing/Kayaking	30	Penrith Whitewater Stadium (canoe polo and slalom), Sydney International Regatta Centre (flatwater), Nepean River (marathon)
Cycling	30	Dunc Gray Velodrome (track and women's criterium), Lansdowne Park (men's criterium), Eastern Creek Raceway & Western Sydney International Dragway(individual time trial and road race)
Diving	25	Sydney Olympic Park Aquatic Centre
Football	30	Valentine Sports Park, Bernie Mullane Sports Complex, Fred Caterson Reserve
Golf	35	Bankstown Golf Club, Bonnie Doon Golf Club, Liverpool Golf Club, Long Reef Golf Club, Mona Vale Golf Club, Monash Country Club, New South Wales Golf Club, Pennant Hills Golf Club, Pymble Golf Club, Ryde-Parramatta Golf Club, St Michael's Golf Club, The Coast Golf Club, The Lakes Golf Club
Hockey	35	Sydney Olympic Park Hockey Centre, Cintra Park Hockey Centre, The Crest Hockey Centre
Lawn bowls	30	Birrong Bowling and Sports Club
Netball	35	Anne Clark Netball Centre ^{Map}, Parramatta Auburn Netball Association Courts
Orienteering	35	Lithgow (long), Sydney (sprint)
Rowing	27	Sydney International Regatta Centre
Rugby union	30 for women and 35 for men	TG Millner Field, Macquarie University Sports Fields
Sailing	35	Woollahra Sailing Club, Dobroyd Aquatic Club
Shooting	30	Sydney International Shooting Centre
Softball	30	Blacktown Olympic Park Softball Centre, Jacqui Osmond Softball Centre, Kelso Park North Softball Complex
Squash	35	Dural Squash and Fitness Centre, Thornleigh Squash and Fitness Centre
Surf lifesaving	30	Manly Beach (subject to Council approval)
Swimming	25	Sydney Olympic Park Aquatic Centre (pool), Chowder Bay (open water)
Table tennis	30	Hurstville Aquatic Leisure Centre
Tennis	30	Sydney Olympic Park Tennis Centre, Cintra Park
Touch football	30	St Marys Leagues Club, The Kingsway Playing Fields
Volleyball	30	Sydney Olympic Park Sports Halls (indoor) ^{Map}, Maroubra Beach (beach)
Water polo	30	Ryde Aquatic Leisure Centre, MLC School Aquatic Centre, Ashfield Aquatic Centre
Weightlifting	35	Sydney Olympic Park, Southee Complex

== Advisory Committee ==
Appointed by the New South Wales Government to advise the New South Wales Minister for Sport and Recreation and the chief executive officer of the Sydney 2009 World Masters Games Organising Committee on all aspects of the planning and staging of the Sydney 2009 World Masters Games, the Sydney 2009 World Masters Games Advisory Committee, as of March 2009, comprised these seven people:

Position	Name	Other roles
Chair	Margy Osmond	Chief Executive Officer of the Australian National Retailers Association
Member	Phil Coles AM	Member of the International Olympic Committee, Vice President of the World Taekwondo Federation
Member	Bob Elphinston OAM	President of the International Basketball Federation
Member	Michelle Ford-Eriksson MBE	1980 Summer Olympic Games gold medallist
Member	Chris Jordan AO	Chairman of KPMG New South Wales
Member	John Moore	Managing Director of the Global Brands Group Australasia
Member	David Brettell	Chief Executive Officer of the Australian Cancer Research Foundation

== Organising Committee ==
Headed by Shane O'Leary, the Sydney 2009 World Masters Games Organising Committee comprised five divisions with, as of March 2009, its key personnel being:

Position	Name
Chief Executive Officer	Shane O'Leary
Chief Operating Officer	Lynne Bates AM
Group Manager, Games Services	James Hunter
Group Manager, Finance and Corporate Services	Sally Judd
Group Manager, Marketing	Rod Dowler
Group Manager, Communications & Media	Natalie Saltyskewer
Group Manager, Sport and Venues	Nick Jordan

== See also ==
- World Masters Games
