= 2008 European Masters Games =

The 2008 European Masters Games was the first edition of the multi-sport event for masters sport, which took place between 29 August – 7 September 2008 in Malmö, Sweden. 3022 participants from 46 countries competed in 18 sports.

== Sports ==
- American football
- Archery
- Athletics
- Badminton
- Beach volleyball
- Cue sports (Pool)
- Fencing
- Football
- Golf
- Handball
- Indoor Bandy
- Karate
- Orienteering
- Rugby
- Squash
- Table tennis
- Volleyball
- Wrestling

The sports that were contracted, but that did not hold their competitions, were:

- Basketball
- Carom billiards
- Boules/Petanque
- Bowling
- Cycling
- Ju-Jitsu
- Judo
- Lifesaving
- Rowing
- Sailing
- Shooting

Exhibition sports

During the week of the EMG a number of sporting events were held that were associated with the EMG, but that had their own organisations and application systems. These were an invitation competition for fencing, an international football match for “old boys” between the Danish European champions from 1992 and the Swedish team that finished third in the 1994 World Cup at Malmö IP, the Christian-loppet race (an open cycling race between Helsingborg and Malmö) and an open half marathon.

== Results ==
- https://www.imga.ch/assets/Uploads/Reports/EMG2008-Final-Report.pdf
- https://www.imga.ch/assets/Uploads/Results/Athletics.pdf
- http://websites.sportstg.com/select_node.cgi?cID=2209&p=1
- http://websites.sportstg.com/assoc_page.cgi?assoc=4674&pID=1
- http://websites.sportstg.com/assoc_page.cgi?assoc=4665&pID=1
- http://websites.sportstg.com/assoc_page.cgi?assoc=4676&pID=1
- http://websites.sportstg.com/assoc_page.cgi?assoc=4679&pID=1
- http://websites.sportstg.com/assoc_page.cgi?assoc=4670&pID=1
- http://websites.sportstg.com/assoc_page.cgi?assoc=4656&pID=1
- http://websites.sportstg.com/assoc_page.cgi?assoc=4654&pID=1
- http://websites.sportstg.com/assoc_page.cgi?assoc=4673&pID=1
- http://websites.sportstg.com/assoc_page.cgi?assoc=4671&pID=1
- http://websites.sportstg.com/assoc_page.cgi?assoc=4682&pID=1
- http://websites.sportstg.com/assoc_page.cgi?assoc=4667&pID=1
- http://websites.sportstg.com/assoc_page.cgi?assoc=4664&pID=1
- http://websites.sportstg.com/assoc_page.cgi?assoc=4660&pID=1
- http://websites.sportstg.com/assoc_page.cgi?assoc=4655&pID=1
- http://websites.sportstg.com/assoc_page.cgi?assoc=4653&pID=1
