= GYF domain =

GYF
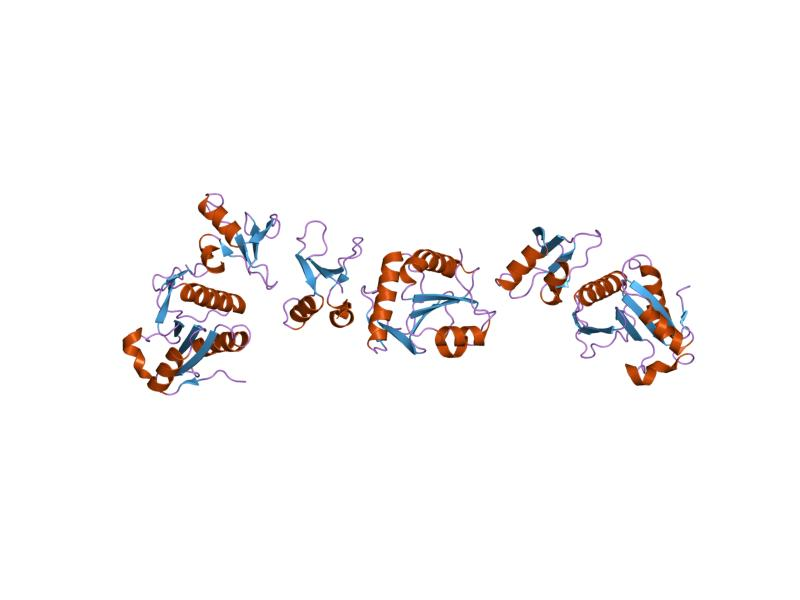
- the crystal structure of a binary u5 snrnp complex

Identifiers
- Symbol: GYF
- Pfam: PF02213
- InterPro: IPR003169
- SMART: GYF
- SCOP2: 1gyf / SCOPe / SUPFAM
- CDD: cd00072
Available protein structures:
- PDB: IPR003169 PF02213 (ECOD; PDBsum)
- AlphaFold: IPR003169; PF02213

In molecular biology, the GYF domain (glycine-tyrosine-phenylalanine domain) is an approximately 60-amino acid protein domain which contains a conserved GP[YF]xxxx[MV]xxWxxx[GN]YF motif. It was identified in the human intracellular protein termed CD2 binding protein 2 (CD2BP2), which binds to a site containing two tandem PPPGHR segments within the cytoplasmic region of CD2. Binding experiments and mutational analyses have demonstrated the critical importance of the GYF tripeptide in ligand binding. A GYF domain is also found in several other eukaryotic proteins of unknown function. It has been proposed that the GYF domain found in these proteins could also be involved in proline-rich sequence recognition. Resolution of the structure of the CD2BP2 GYF domain by NMR spectroscopy revealed a compact domain with a beta-beta-alpha-beta-beta topology, where the single alpha-helix is tilted away from the twisted, anti-parallel beta-sheet. The conserved residues of the GYF domain create a contiguous patch of predominantly hydrophobic nature which forms an integral part of the ligand-binding site. There is limited homology within the C-terminal 20-30 amino acids of various GYF domains, supporting the idea that this part of the domain is structurally but not functionally important.
