= 2015 European Masters Games =

- Dates: 1–11 October 2015
- Host city: Nice, France
- Participation: 6,702 athletes

The 2015 European Masters Games was the third edition of the multi-sport event for masters sport, which took place between 1–11 October 2015 in Nice, France. 6,702 participants from 76 countries competed in 27 sports.

== Sports ==
https://web.archive.org/web/20160417025444/https://registration.emg-nice2015.fr/en/sports

- Archery (40 to 60)
- Athletics (30 to 100)
- 10 km Road Race (Running)
- Badminton
- Basketball
- Beach volleyball
- Canoe Ocean Racing
- Cycling
- Dancesport
- Fencing
- Football
- Handball
- Judo
- Karate
- Orienteering
- Petanque
- Rowing (Sea Rowing)
- Rugby
- Sailing
- Squash
- Swimming
- Open Water Swimming
- Taekwondo
- Table Tennis
- Tennis
- Triathlon
- Volleyball
- Weightlifting

== Medal table ==
Rank	Nation	Gold	Silver	Bronze	Total
1	France (FRA)*	483	416	386	1,285
2	Russia (RUS)	447	299	253	999
3	Germany (GER)	210	149	114	473
4	Italy (ITA)	205	143	176	524
5	Ukraine (UKR)	176	120	66	362
6	Great Britain (GBR)	145	114	60	319
7	Switzerland (SUI)	91	49	39	179
8	Lithuania (LTU)	76	83	92	251
9	Poland (POL)	65	39	27	131
10	Austria (AUT)	61	35	12	108
11	Netherlands (NED)	50	38	17	105
12	Latvia (LAT)	43	39	35	117
13	Hungary (HUN)	41	46	26	113
14	Bulgaria (BUL)	40	25	18	83
15	Slovakia (SVK)	39	32	26	97
16	Czech Republic (CZE)	35	40	45	120
17	Sweden (SWE)	33	21	10	64
18	Canada (CAN)	30	8	11	49
19	Belgium (BEL)	29	33	27	89
20	Spain (ESP)	28	14	18	60
21	Ireland (IRL)	26	18	23	67
22	Romania (ROU)	25	11	6	42
23	Finland (FIN)	24	28	17	69
24	Slovenia (SLO)	19	23	11	53
25	Luxembourg (LUX)	16	0	0	16
26	Estonia (EST)	15	3	2	20
27	United States (USA)	14	16	6	36
28	Israel (ISR)	14	2	0	16
29	Norway (NOR)	12	9	6	27
30	Aruba (ARU)	12	0	0	12
31	North Macedonia (MKD)	11	0	1	12
32	Australia (AUS)	9	13	10	32
33	Portugal (POR)	8	0	0	8
34	New Zealand (NZL)	7	8	0	15
35	Turkey (TUR)	7	2	9	18
36	Mongolia (MGL)	6	6	7	19
37	Belarus (BLR)	6	4	8	18
38	Croatia (CRO)	6	3	0	9
39	Brazil (BRA)	4	7	5	16
40	Martinique (MTQ)	4	2	0	6
41	South Africa (RSA)	4	0	0	4
42	Azerbaijan (AZE)	3	9	0	12
43	Serbia (SRB)	3	5	2	10
44	Greece (GRE)	3	3	0	6
44	New Caledonia (NCL)	3	3	0	6
46	French Polynesia (TAH)	3	0	1	4
47	French Guiana (GYF)	3	0	0	3
47	Moldova (MDA)	3	0	0	3
47	Trinidad and Tobago (TRI)	3	0	0	3
50	Denmark (DEN)	2	7	5	14
51	Monaco (MON)	2	3	0	5
52	Argentina (ARG)	2	2	5	9
53	Réunion (REU)	2	0	0	2
54	Kazakhstan (KAZ)	1	7	15	23
55	Iceland (ISL)	1	2	1	4
56	Åland (ALA)	1	0	0	1
57	Caribbean Netherlands (BES)	0	9	0	9
58	Japan (JPN)	0	4	2	6
59	Bosnia and Herzegovina (BIH)	0	3	0	3
60	Lebanon (LIB)	0	1	0	1
61	India (IND)	0	0	3	3
61	Peru (PER)	0	0	3	3
63	Cambodia (CAM)	0	0	1	1
63	Senegal (SEN)	0	0	1	1
63	Sri Lanka (SRI)	0	0	1	1
Totals (65 entries)		2,611	1,956	1,609	6,176

== Results ==
- https://web.archive.org/web/20150216092333/http://www.nice.fr/fr/sports/european-masters-games-2015
- https://web.archive.org/web/20160817065004/https://registration.emg-nice2015.fr/en/ranking
- https://web.archive.org/web/20160402182909/https://registration.emg-nice2015.fr/en/results
- https://web.archive.org/web/20160417025444/https://registration.emg-nice2015.fr/en/sports
- https://www.imga.ch/assets/Uploads/Reports/EMG-RAPPORT-FINAL-FR.pdf
- https://www.imga.ch/assets/Uploads/Results/Tir-a-larc.pdf
- https://www.imga.ch/assets/Uploads/Results/resultats-athletisme.pdf
- https://www.imga.ch/assets/Uploads/Results/Badminton-emg2015.pdf
- https://www.imga.ch/assets/Uploads/Results/resultats-basket.pdf
- https://www.imga.ch/assets/Uploads/Results/resultats-beach-volley.pdf
- https://www.imga.ch/assets/Uploads/Results/Cyclisme.pdf
- https://www.imga.ch/assets/Uploads/Results/Danse-sportive.pdf
- https://www.imga.ch/assets/Uploads/Results/Escrime.pdf
- https://www.imga.ch/assets/Uploads/Results/resultats-football.pdf
- https://www.imga.ch/assets/Uploads/Results/resultats-handball.pdf
- https://www.imga.ch/assets/Uploads/Results/Judo.pdf
- https://www.imga.ch/assets/Uploads/Results/resultats-karatC.pdf
- https://www.imga.ch/assets/Uploads/Results/Natation-en-eau-libre.pdf
- https://www.imga.ch/assets/Uploads/Results/Course-dorientation.pdf
- https://www.imga.ch/assets/Uploads/Results/Course-sur-route.pdf
- https://www.imga.ch/assets/Uploads/Results/resultats-aviron.pdf
- https://www.imga.ch/assets/Uploads/Results/resultats-rugby.pdf
- https://www.imga.ch/assets/Uploads/Results/Kayak-de-mer.pdf
- https://www.imga.ch/assets/Uploads/Results/resultats-squash.pdf
- https://www.imga.ch/assets/Uploads/Results/Natation.pdf
- https://www.imga.ch/assets/Uploads/Results/RESULTATS-tennis-table.pdf
- https://www.imga.ch/assets/Uploads/Results/resultats-taekwondo.pdf
- https://www.imga.ch/assets/Uploads/Results/resultats-tennis.pdf
- https://www.imga.ch/assets/Uploads/Results/resultats-volley.pdf
- https://www.imga.ch/assets/Uploads/Results/Halterophilie.pdf
