= Speed-ball =

Racquet sport

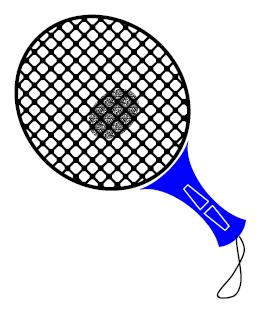

Speed-Ball (Arabic: كرة السرعة / [kurat.assurʕa]) is a racquet sport invented in Egypt in 1961 by Mohamed Lotfy, father of Hussein Lotfy (first world champion) and Ahmad Lotfy (the present president of FISB), for the training of beginner tennis players. Today it is a sport in its own right, enjoying popularity not only in Egypt but in other countries. Several of these countries make up the International Federation of Speed-Ball (FISB).

== Description ==
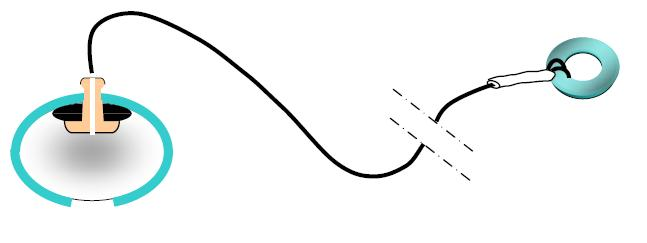

A hollow ball in latex revolves around a metallic mast (1,70m high) which is linked by a nylon thread (fishing thread type) of 1,70m length. The thread is knotted to the mast by a loop or a plastic ring freely revolving around a reel. The mast is fixed in a base from 40 kg to 90 kg. The ball is elliptic and is hit with a rigid plastic racquet with a small handle and strings around 25 cm diameter. The speed-ball court is about 6x4 m. for the single match and 8x6 m. for the doubles.

== Rules for speed-ball ==
Speed-ball is played alone (super-solo), with two players (single match), or with four players (double match or relay).

=== Super-solo ===

In Super-solo, the aim is to hit the ball a maximum times in one minute. At first with the right hand, then a minute again with the left hand, then with two racquets in fore-hand only, then with two racquets in back-hand only. The number of hits of each movement is added to make the final score of the solo.

The duration of one movement is 30 seconds for the players under 14 years old and one minute for older players. A break of 30 seconds for all classes is granted behind each movement.

The best players can do up to 160 hits in one minute.

The current men's world record is 621 hits, set by Egypt's Mohammed Nagy Elagroudy in the 31st world championship in France (2019), while the women's record of 539 hits set by Egyptian Noha AbouZeid in the 26th world championship in Kuwait.

=== Single match ===

The single match is played by two players, each with one racquet. Each player has their own ground, separated by a neutral strip 60 cm wide (the diameter of the speed-ball's base). A match is divided into games of 10 points. The players attempt to hit the ball once each in turn, inverting its direction of rotation. To score points, the ball must pass twice successively across the opponent's ground, without the opponent being able to return it. If there is a fault, the point is missed and there is a new service. The service is alternated according to who wins each point. The first player to score 10 points wins the game. The first player who wins two games (three games for men's seniors) wins the match.

=== Double match ===

The double match takes place like the single, in two teams of two players. In each team, the players serve and hit the ball alternatively. The general rules are the same as the single.

Specific mistakes involve the player's rotation and reception of the ball.

=== Relay ===
is a

== International Federation ==
The International Federation of Speed-Ball (FISB) was founded in 1985 by the membership of Egypt, France, and Japan.

Several other countries have since joined the federation, such as Kuwait, KSA, Pakistan, Sudan, India, Lebanon, Nigeria, Afghanistan, Tunisia, USA, Poland, Algeria, Libya, and Morocco.

== 2025 Members ==
19 Members in 2025:

Founder countries (3): Egypt, France, Japan.

Others (16): Algeria, Canada, Germany, India, Iraq, Jordan, Kuwait, Libya, Mauritania, Morocco, Nigeria, Pakistan, Poland, Spain, Tunisia and the United States of America.

== World Championship ==
27th World Speedball Championship was held in 2015 in Poland.

== See also ==
- Legball
