= Americas Masters Games =

Regional multi-sport event

- 2024 Pan American Masters Games logo
- Genre: sporting event; senior sports
- Frequency: quadrennial
- Inaugurated: 26 August 2016
- Most recent: 26 August - 4 September 2016
- Next event: 12 - 23 July 2024
- Organiser: International Masters Games Association
- Website: clevelandmasters2024.com

The Pan American Masters Games or Americas Masters Games is a regional multi-sport event which involves participants from across the world. Governed by the International Masters Games Association (IMGA), the Americas Masters Games is open to participants of all abilities and most ages – the minimum age criterion is 30 years. Participants compete for themselves, instead of their countries. There are no competition qualification requirements apart from the age requirement and membership in that sport's governing body. The event's first edition was hosted by Vancouver, Canada from 26 August to 4 September 2016.

== Editions ==
Edition	Year	Host city	Country	Sports	Competitors	Dates
1	2016	Vancouver	Canada			26 August – 4 September
-	2022	Rio de Janeiro	Brazil		-	Cancelled
2	2024	Cleveland	USA		TBD	12–23 July
3	2028					

2020 was postponed and later cancelled.

== See also ==
- South American Games
- World Masters Games
- Asia Pacific Masters Games
- European Masters Games
- USA Masters Games
- South American Masters Games
