= Australian Masters Games =

The Australian Masters Games is a biennial sporting event and the largest multi-sport participation sporting event in Australia. Garry Daly as President of the Confederation of Australian Sport proposed the concept of Masters Games to the Northern Territory government. It went on to establish the Central Australian Masters Games in 1986. The first Australian Masters Games were held in Hobart, Tasmania in 1987. The Australian Masters Games event is owned by the Confederation of Australian Sport and state governments and cities bid to host the Games. The minimum age for most sports is 30 years of age however some of the sports, like Gymnastics, the minimum age for participation is 20 years of age.

Edition	Year	Host	Sports	Competitors
1st	1987	Hobart	35	3695
2nd	1989	Adelaide	42	7415
3rd	1991	Brisbane	40	5957
4th	1993	Perth	40	5759
5th	1995	Melbourne	51	10479
6th	1997	Canberra	31	8811
7th	1999	Adelaide	46	10144
8th	2001	Newcastle	61	11225
9th	2003	Canberra	58	10326
10th	2005	Adelaide	59	10003
11th	2007	Adelaide	52	9693
12th	2009	Geelong	50	7126
13th	2011	Adelaide	52	8103
14th	2013	Geelong	51	7771
15th	2015	Adelaide	49	8159
16th	2017	NW Tasmania	47	5109
17th	2019	Adelaide	45	7036
18th	2021	Perth	51	
19th	2023	Adelaide	45+	9000
20th	2025	Canberra		
21st	2027	Newcastle & Central Coast	TBC	

The estimated number of competitors for future events includes volunteers and social participants. An official breakdown of the three participant categories is provided in an update to the participation report by the organisers following each event.

== Sports ==
These were the sports on offer for the 2021 edition of the games.

- Archery
- Artistic Swimming
- Athletics
- Badminton
- Baseball
- Basketball
- Bocce
- Boxing
- Canoe/Kayak
- Cricket
- Croquet
- Cue Sports
- Cycling
- Dancesport
- Darts
- Dragon Boat
- Fencing
- Figure Skating
- Finswimming
- Football
- Futsal
- Golf
- Gymnastics
- Hockey
- Judo
- Kendo
- Lawn Bowls
- Mountain Bike
- Netball
- Padel
- Petanque
- Powerlifting
- Rowing
- Rowing Indoor
- Rugby Union
- Sailing
- Sailing – Windsurfer LT
- Shooting – clay target, revolver & pistol, smallbore & air rifle
- Softball
- Squash
- Swimming
- Table Tennis
- Taekwondo
- Tennis
- Tenpin Bowling
- Touch Football
- Volleyball - beach and indoor
- Wrestling

== See also ==
- Pacific Games
- Arafura Games
- Australian Youth Olympic Festival
