= Park golf =

Form of golf played in a park invented in Makubetsu, Japan

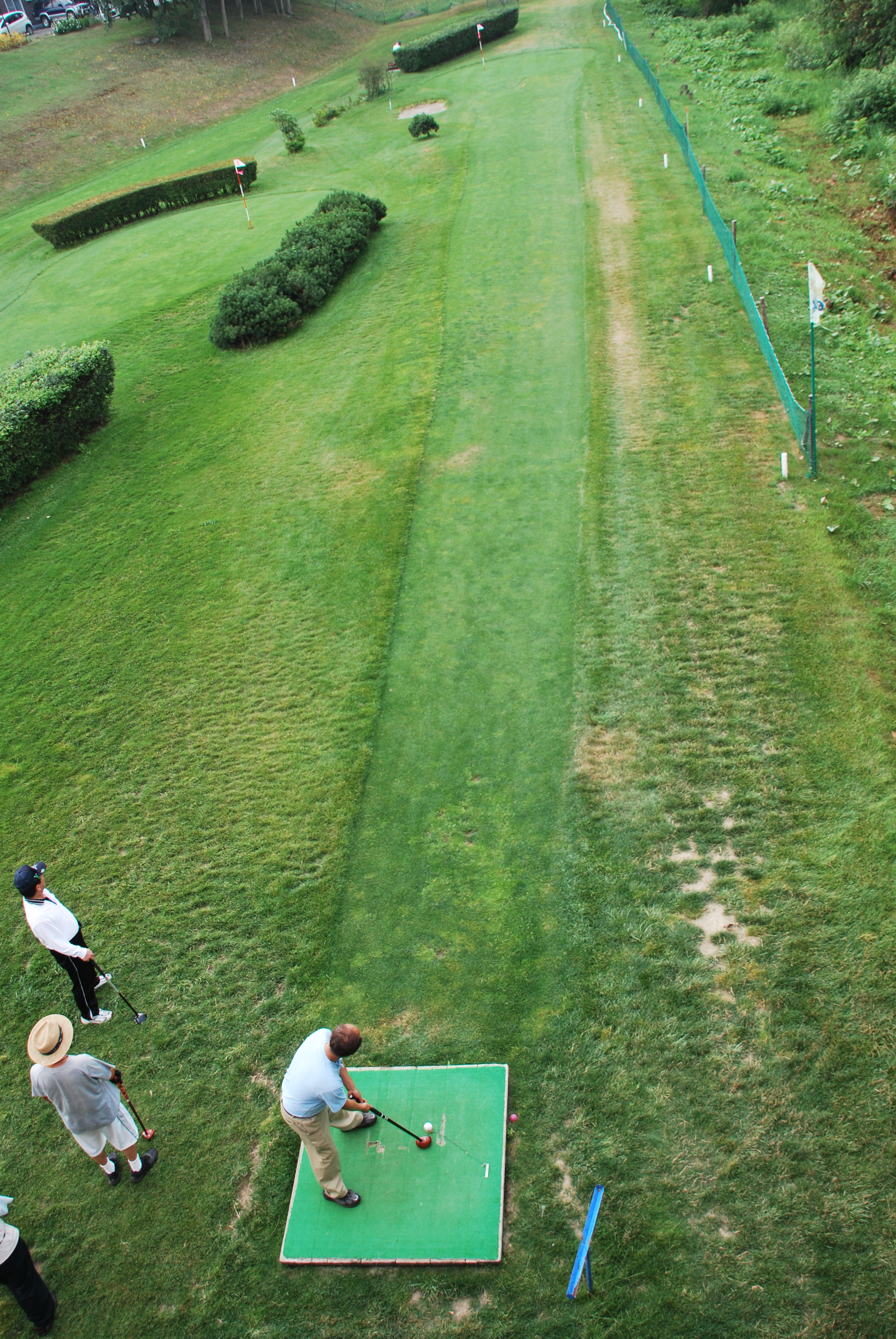
- A player about to swing at a park golf course in Eniwa, Hokkaido.

Presence
- Olympic: No
- Paralympic: No

Park golf (パークゴルフ, pāku gorufu) is a form of golf played in a park that was invented in Makubetsu, Hokkaido, Japan in 1983. Aesthetically, it resembles a sport somewhere between golf and croquet and is one of Japan's new sports. The competitive object of the game is to hit the ball into a hole with a club in the fewest strokes. At the same time, there is also a strong emphasis on harmony with other players (players of park golf are referred to as parkers) and the natural setting of the course.

The founders of the sport wanted to keep it simple so that people of all ages could become parkers easily. A single ball and club are sufficient for a game of park golf. Courses are relatively short and the physical strain of the game is low. The cost of playing is also low and the rules are simple. For this reason, it is a good sport for children and families. Despite this, the majority of the 700,000 parkers continue to be of retirement age.

== Course ==
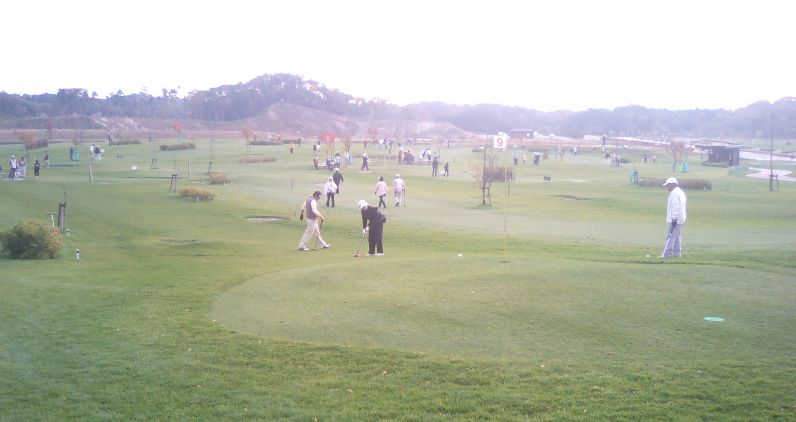
A busy day on a Park Golf course in Miyagi, Japan.

A "round" of park golf is 9 holes. The International Park Golf Association has set upper limits on the length of park golf holes and courses. The maximum length for an individual hole is 100 meters. A 9-hole course is limited to 500 meters or less. Because there is no lower limit, courses can be found in small corners of parks or in the fringe around parking lots.

== Equipment ==
=== Clubs ===
It is played using a club similar in appearance to a standard golf driver with a thicker, shorter shaft. The head on a Park Golf club is rarely varied, but the length of stick can change according to the height of the Parker. The club is flat, and only the most skillful Parker can hit the ball in the air.

=== Balls ===
The durable plastic resin balls are bright-coloured so they can be easily distinguished from a distance. They come in many colours but are all 60 millimetres (2.4 inches) in diameter and less than 100 grams (3.5 oz). Balls may be made of a single or multiple components and individual manufactures' balls all perform slightly differently. It is not unusual to see players with several balls for use in different conditions.

=== Ball carriers ===
Although some people carry their balls in their hand between rounds or place it in their pockets, others invest in various ball-carrying devices. The most basic is a moulded length of stainless steel which is attached to the belt or shoelaces. High-end carriers resemble a leather fanny pack and can hold multiple balls, cellular phones, score cards and other personal items.

=== Scorecard protector ===
Park golfers often use a scorecard holder to protect the scorecard from the elements. Inexpensive versions of this accessory are available for 200 yen. Some models include an attached pencil.

== Brands ==
Park golf equipment is produced by a variety of manufacturers, with brand presence differing by region. The market is characterized by a wide range of products, from premium models to mass-market options.

=== Premium brands ===
Honma is a Japanese luxury golf brand established in Tokyo in 1959. It is widely recognized for adhering to traditional handcrafted production methods. Some models feature gold or platinum ornamentation, placing them in the highest price category. Its park golf clubs are produced with the same philosophy as its golf lines, combining high cost with consistent performance. The brand is generally referred to as Honma Golf and is distinct from Bukuro Honma.

Martin Carat 1837 is a brand inspired by the craftsmanship traditions of the Victorian era in Britain. It combines woodworking with elements of jewelry design, most notably the inclusion of diamond details in some products. The brand emphasizes ergonomic design aimed at reducing joint impact, positioning itself as particularly health-friendly for older players.

=== Popular brands ===
Japanese manufacturers play a central role in the park golf market, as Japan is the birthplace of the sport. Mizuno and Asics are among the most widely used brands domestically. Both companies originally established reputations in broader sports equipment markets, such as baseball and athletics, and later expanded into park golf as the sport grew. Their equipment continues to hold a high share of the Japanese market, particularly in the mid-range, mass-market category. The premium brand Honma is also part of this Japanese tradition.

== Rules ==
A typical sign showing a hole not to be missed

A player draws the rod designating third play ("san-ban")

Park golf uses terminology similar to golf, using words such as par, bogey, eagle and double eagle. To formally play a game of Park Golf, two to four participants are required to form one group. Order is decided by drawing rods that are generally provided by the course management at the beginning of each course. Once initial shooting order is determined, the group decides which course to play on as most parks have 2-4 courses, one course being 9 holes. Multiple courses can be played. Holes can be shot in any order, as long as all holes are played eventually. This occurs most commonly due to a quick group advancing on a slower group of park golfers.

During a tournament, rules are that the person to shoot the lowest number of strokes on one hole, goes first the following hole. The highest number of strokes results in going last. Thus, shooting order changes frequently and is something that must be paid attention to. During the game, if a player is having difficulty finishing a hole, rules state that a player may take eight as their score once they exceed this number of strokes and move on.

The playing field is marked by a green, semi-fairway, fairway, bunkers, rough, and out of bounds. Balls landing out of bounds are replaced to an area on the fairway equal distance from the hole, the player taking two strokes for this mistake instead of playing from where the ball had landed. The player at the end of all accrued courses with the lowest score is the winner.

== Etiquette ==
In Park Golf, etiquette is based around the principles of enjoyment of the game and enjoyment of nature.

=== Environment ===
Players take care not to damage the greenery and smoking on all courses is forbidden.

=== Stance ===
A: Ashi-donari stance, slightly behind the ball, used for getting loft on delicate chip shots. B: Kata-haba stance used for stability during long drives.

Stance is the foundation upon which Park Golf shots are constructed. An address behind the ball is used to increase the loft of a shot. Likewise, a forward stance will help keep the ball running along the ground. An open stance offers stability; a closed stance gives precision. This is a difficult choice for a parker and requires decisiveness and concentration.

=== Treatment of others ===
Players are to be considerate of the group behind them by moving off the green once their play is over. Likewise, the group should not enter the next green prior to that group's play being completed. Players are encouraged to continuously check their surroundings to ensure the safety of themselves and others. In addition, players are advised to only give advice when asked in order to avoid meddling.

== Tournaments ==
There are regular tournaments, with scores as low as 96 for 4 rounds. One unexceptional competitor recently recorded a score of 22 for a round. Tournaments usually cost 1000 yen, which often includes a box lunch. The winner generally gets an envelope with a small amount of money, and the runners-up get boxes of tissues. Very often the courses are closed because people are having a tournament.

== Outside Japan ==
American wrestler Dick "The Destroyer" Beyer, who spent several years wrestling in Japan, imported the sport of park golf to the United States and opened the first park golf course in the country, in his native Akron, New York in July 2013. The course hosted the first International Park Golf Association tournament in North America on July 12-13, 2025.
