= European Masters Games =

Multi-sport event

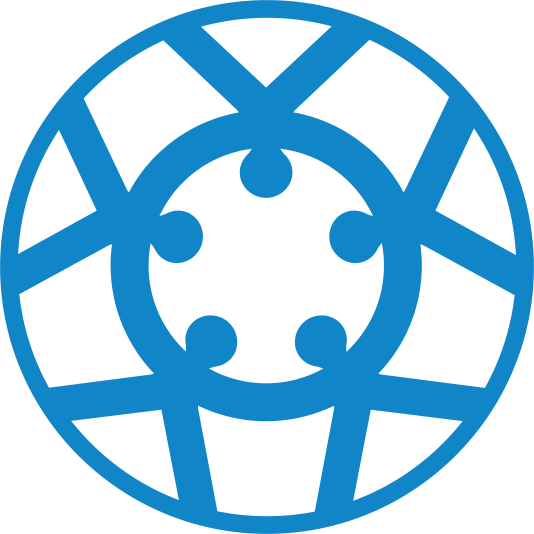
- Inaugurated: 2008
- Leader: The Duke of Sussex
- Headquarters: IMGA

The European Masters Games (EMG) is a multi-sport event, consisting of summer sports, held every four years. The European Masters Games are owned by the International Masters Games Association (IMGA), owners of the World Masters Games. The age categories vary depending on the sport, but the competition is generally for people 30–35 years or older. The first games were held in 2008 in Malmö, Sweden. The European Masters Games are held once every four years, while the last games were held in 2015 in Nice, France. The next games will be celebrated in Turin, Italy, in 2019. The International Masters Games Association (IMGA), based in Lausanne, Switzerland, is the body responsible for the bidding and placing of the games.

== History ==
The first European Masters Games (EMG) was held from August 29 to September 7, 2008, in Malmö, Sweden. There were a total of 3,022 athletes who competed in 18 sports during the 10 days the games were held.

== Editions ==
Edition	Year	City	Country	Dates	Sports	Athletes	Source
European Masters Games
1	2008	Malmö	Sweden	29 August – 7 September	18	3,022	
2	2011	Lignano Sabbiadoro	Italy	10 – 20 September	20	4,000	
3	2015	Nice	France	1 – 11 October	27	7,200	
4	2019	Turin	Italy	26 July – 4 August	31	7,500	
5	2023	Tampere	Finland	26 June – 7 July	27	7,500	
Regional (European) Open Masters Series
6	2027	Como	Italy				

Results:

== Results ==
=== 2023 European Masters Games ===
Report:

About:

=== Sports ===
1. Core Sports (20): Archery, Athletics, Badminton, Basketball, Canoe Kayak, Cycling, Floorball, Football, Futsal, Golf, Orienteering, Rowing, Shooting, Squash, Table Tennis, Taekwondo, Tennis, Triathlon, Volleyball, Weightlifting
2. Additional sports (6): Disc Golf, Handball, Inline Hockey, Judo, Karate, Swimming
3. Demonstration sports (3): Darts, Petanque, Padel
4. Para sports (4): Swimming, Athletics, Sitting Volleyball, Table Tennis

=== Results ===
Results:

1. https://www.emg2023.fi/wp-content/uploads/CErTIFICATION-OF-PARTICIPATION.pdf
2. https://www.emg2023.fi/wp-content/uploads/EMG2023_tulokset_kaikki.pdf
3. https://www.emg2023.fi/wp-content/uploads/Results-EMG-2023-Half-Marathon-Tampere-8.7.2023.pdf
4. https://www.emg2023.fi/wp-content/uploads/Results-EMG-2023-Road-Race-Walk-10-km-Tampere-05.07.2023.pdf
5. https://www.emg2023.fi/wp-content/uploads/EMG23-ArcheryTarget-results.pdf
6. https://www.emg2023.fi/wp-content/uploads/EMG23-ArcheryField-Results.pdf
7. https://www.emg2023.fi/wp-content/uploads/EMG-2023-badminton-medalists.pdf
8. https://www.emg2023.fi/wp-content/uploads/EMG20203_Basketball_schedule-and-results.pdf
9. https://www.emg2023.fi/wp-content/uploads/EMG2023_BVT_beach_volleyball_all_results_20230907.pdf
10. https://www.emg2023.fi/wp-content/uploads/EMG2023-canoe-slalom-results.pdf
11. https://www.emg2023.fi/wp-content/uploads/EMG2023-Canoeing-Full-Results.pdf
12. https://www.emg2023.fi/wp-content/uploads/EMG23-Cycling-Criterium1_2-Results.pdf
13. https://www.emg2023.fi/wp-content/uploads/EMG23-Cycling-Criterium2_2-Results.pdf
14. https://www.emg2023.fi/wp-content/uploads/EMG23-Cycling-MTB1_2-Results.pdf
15. https://www.emg2023.fi/wp-content/uploads/EMG23-Cycling-MTB2_2-Results.pdf
16. https://www.emg2023.fi/wp-content/uploads/EMG23-Cycling-RoadRace1_2-Results.pdf
17. https://www.emg2023.fi/wp-content/uploads/EMG23-Cycling-RoadRace2_2-Results.pdf
18. https://www.emg2023.fi/wp-content/uploads/emg-discgolf-results-fin.pdf
19. https://www.emg2023.fi/wp-content/uploads/EMG23-Floorball-M35-M40-Results.pdf
20. https://www.emg2023.fi/wp-content/uploads/EMG23-Floorball-M50-Results.pdf
21. https://www.emg2023.fi/wp-content/uploads/EMG2023-Football-Final-Rankings.pdf
22. https://www.emg2023.fi/wp-content/uploads/EMG2023_Futsal_final_results.pdf
23. https://www.emg2023.fi/wp-content/uploads/golf_results.pdf
24. https://www.emg2023.fi/wp-content/uploads/EMG2023-Handball-29.6.-2.7.2023-Final-Results.pdf
25. https://www.emg2023.fi/wp-content/uploads/EMG2023_JUDO_RESULTS.pdf
26. https://www.emg2023.fi/wp-content/uploads/Karate-EMG2023-Results-new.pdf
27. https://www.emg2023.fi/wp-content/uploads/EMG23-Orienteering-results.pdf
28. https://www.emg2023.fi/wp-content/uploads/Padelemg_tulokset.pdf
29. https://www.emg2023.fi/wp-content/uploads/EMG-2023-petanque.pdf
30. https://www.emg2023.fi/wp-content/uploads/all_results.pdf
31. https://www.emg2023.fi/wp-content/uploads/EMG23-Shooting-Air-Guns-Results.pdf
32. https://www.emg2023.fi/wp-content/uploads/EMG23-Shooting-Trap-results.pdf
33. https://www.emg2023.fi/wp-content/uploads/EMG2023-SQUASH.pdf
34. https://www.emg2023.fi/wp-content/uploads/EMG23-Swimming-Results.pdf
35. https://www.emg2023.fi/wp-content/uploads/EMG-2023-TAMPERE-TT-RESULTS-1.pdf
36. https://www.emg2023.fi/wp-content/uploads/EMG-2023-Taekwondo-all-results.pdf
37. https://www.emg2023.fi/wp-content/uploads/EMG_ottelut_tennis.pdf
38. https://www.emg2023.fi/wp-content/uploads/EMG23-Triathlon-results.pdf
39. https://www.emg2023.fi/wp-content/uploads/EMG23-Volleyball-results.pdf
40. Weightlifting: https://painonnosto.fi/emg-2023-tampere-28-29-6-osallistujat-participants/

== Summer sports ==
Number	Event	2008	2011	2015	2019	2023
Main Sports
1	Athletics	Yes	Yes	Yes	Yes	Yes
2	Canoeing	No	Yes	Yes	Yes	Yes
3	Cycling	No	Yes	Yes	Yes	Yes
4	Rowing	No	Yes	Yes	Yes	Yes
5	Sailing	No	Yes	Yes	No	No
6	Shooting	No	Yes	No	Yes	Yes
7	Swimming	No	No	Yes	Yes	Yes
Combat Sports
8	Fencing	Yes	Yes	Yes	Yes	No
9	Judo	No	Yes	Yes	Yes	Yes
10	Karate	Yes	Yes	Yes	Yes	Yes
11	Taekwondo	No	Yes	Yes	Yes	Yes
12	Wrestling	Yes	No	No	No	No
Team Sports
13	American football	Yes	No	No	No	No
14	Bandy	Yes	No	No	No	No
15	Basketball	No	No	Yes	Yes	Yes
16	Beach volleyball	Yes	Yes	Yes	Yes	Yes
17	Field hockey	No	No	No	Yes	No
18	Floorball	No	No	No	Yes	Yes
19	Football	Yes	No	Yes	Yes	Yes
20	Futsal	No	Yes	No	Yes	Yes
21	Handball	Yes	Yes	Yes	Yes	Yes
22	Softball	No	No	No	Yes	No
23	Rugby	Yes	Yes	Yes	No	No
24	Volleyball	Yes	No	Yes	Yes	Yes
Racket Sports
25	Badminton	Yes	No	Yes	Yes	Yes
26	Paddle	No	No	No	Yes	Yes
27	Squash	Yes	No	Yes	No	Yes
28	Table tennis	Yes	No	Yes	No	Yes
29	Tennis	No	Yes	Yes	Yes	Yes
Other Sports
30	Archery	Yes	Yes	Yes	Yes	Yes
31	Cue sports	Yes	No	No	No	No
32	Dancesport	No	Yes	Yes	Yes	No
33	Disc golf	No	No	No	No	Yes
34	Golf	Yes	Yes	No	Yes	Yes
35	Orienteering	Yes	Yes	Yes	No	Yes
36	Petanque	No	No	Yes	No	Yes
37	Sport climbing	No	No	No	No	No
38	Triathlon	No	Yes	Yes	Yes	Yes
39	Wakeboarding	No	No	No	No	No
40	Weightlifting	No	Yes	Yes	Yes	Yes

== See also ==
- World Masters Games
- Asia Pacific Masters Games
- Americas Masters Games
