= World Masters Games =

International multi-sport event

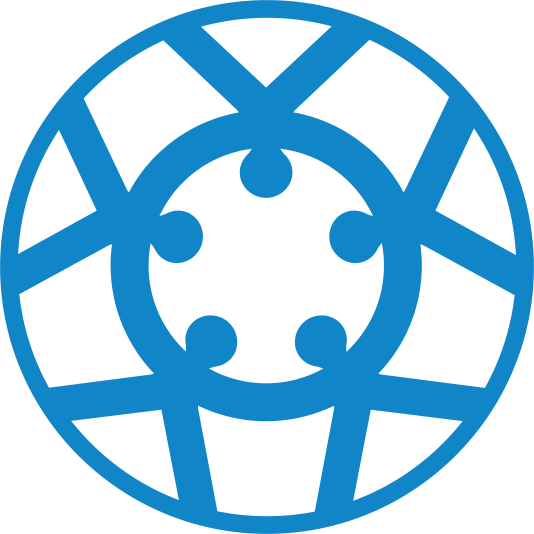
- Status: active
- Genre: sporting event; senior sports
- Frequency: quadrennial
- Inaugurated: 7 August 1985
- Most recent: 17–30 May 2025
- Next event: 2027
- Organiser: International Masters Games Association
- Website: imga.ch

The World Masters Games is an international multi-sport event held every four years which, in terms of competitor numbers, has developed into the largest of its kind. Governed by the International Masters Games Association (IMGA), the World Masters Games is open to sports people of all abilities and most ages – the minimum age criteria ranges between 25 and 35 years depending on the sport. Participants compete for themselves – there are no country delegations. Beyond the age requirement and membership in that sport's governing body, there are no competition qualification requirements.

== History ==
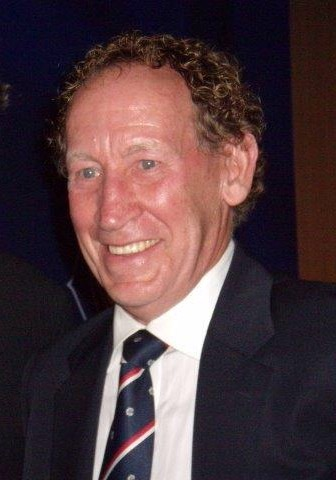
Peter Wright - Three times World Masters Squash Champion

Toronto staged the first World Masters Games in 1985. Since then, World Masters Games has also taken place in Aalborg, Aarhus and Herning (1989), Brisbane (1994), Portland, Oregon (1998), Melbourne (2002), Edmonton (2005) and Sydney (2009). The Sydney 2009 World Masters Games attracted a record 28,676 competitors. This is more than double the number of competitors that took part in the Sydney 2000 Olympic Games.

The Games have been popular with retired professional athletes and former Olympic competitors, with over 230 past Olympians taking part in the 2009 edition.

== Summer Games ==
Edition	Year	Host	Sports	Countries	Competitors	Motto
1	1985	(Canada) Toronto	22	61	8,305	The Year of the Masters
2	1989	(Denmark) Aalborg, Aarhus and Herning	37	76	5,500	Sport for life
3	1994	(Australia) Brisbane	30	74	24,500	The challenge never ends
4	1998	(United States) Portland	28	102	11,400	The global celebration of sport for life
5	2002	(Australia) Melbourne	26	98	24,886	The biggest multi-sport festival on Earth
6	2005	(Canada) Edmonton	25	89	21,600	A festival of sport in the city of festivals
7	2009	(Australia) Sydney	28	95	28,676	Fit, fun and forever young
8	2013	(Italy) Turin	30	99	15,394	Sport for life, Sport for all
9	2017	(New Zealand) Auckland	28	100	28,578	For the Love of Sport
10	2025	(Taiwan) Taipei and New Taipei City	35	108	25,049	Sports Beyond Age, Life Without Limits!
11	2027	(Japan) Kansai region		–	–	
12	2029	(Australia) Perth				

=== 2013 World Masters Games ===
Venues

- Stadio Olimpico – Archery
- Stadio Primo Nebiolo – Athletics
- Stadio del Ghiaccio PalaTazzoli – Badminton
- Passobuole – Baseball, Softball
- Cus Panetti – Basketball, Volleyball (beach)
- Cus E11 Modigliani – Basketball
- Cus palaBallin – Basketball
- Cus Moncrivello – Basketball
- Cus E10 Alvaro – Basketball
- Cus Palaruffini – Basketball
- Cus Palestra Braccini – Basketball
- Palestra Parri – Volleyball
- Cus Centro 2D – Volleyball
- Sebastopoli – Volleyball
- Manzoni – Volleyball
- Cus Bertolla – Volleyball (beach)
- Cus PalaVela – Volleyball (beach)
- CH4 Sporting Club- Volleyball
- A.s.d Pozzo Strada – Lawn bowls (lyonnaise, raffa, lawn bowls)
- A.s.d Petanque Taurinense e la Mole – Lawn bowls (petanque)
- Torino Fiume Po – Canoeing
- Ivrea – Canoeing
- Lago di Candia – Canoeing
- Piscina Acquatica – Canoeing
- Parco del Valentino – Athletics, Cycling Road Race, Duathlon, Triathlon
- Parco Leopardi – Cycling Mountain Bike
- Velodromo Francone – Cycling Track
- Campi Pellerina – Football
- Santa Rita – Football
- Cbs -Football
- Cenisia – Football
- Beppe Viola – Football
- Rapid Torino – Football
- Golf Club Torino La Mandria – Golf
- Royal Park i Roveri – Golf
- Hockey club Bra – Hockey
- Stadio Tazzol – Hockey
- Palestra Centro Storico – Judo, Karate
- Sestriere Torino – Orienteering
- Cesana Torinese
- Pragelato
- Bardonecchia
- Lago di Candia – Rowing
- Impianto Angelo Albonico – Rugby
- Circolo Vela Orta – Sailing
- Remiro Gozzano
- Shooting range Racconigi Tiro Valo – Shooting Clay Target
- Poligono Tiro a Segno Nazionale – Shooting Pistol and Rifle
- Sport City Torino – Squash
- Palanuoto – Swimming
- Stadio del ghiaccio Tazzoli – Table tennis
- PalaMirafiori – Taekwondo
- Sporting Club La Stampa – Tennis
- Palasport Le Cupole – Weightlifting
- Giovanni Paolo II – Baseball, Softball
- Impianto Fanton – Softball
- Servais – Softball

=== 2017 World Masters Games ===
Venues

- ASB Showgrounds – Archery Indoor
- Massey Archery Club – Archery Field
- Cornwall Park – Archery Target
- The Trusts Arena – Athletics Track and Field, Volleyball Indoor
- Auckland Domain – Athletics Cross Country
- Auckland Waterfront – Athletics Road Running, Cycling Time Trial, Triathlon
- Auckland Badminton Centre – Badminton
- North Harbour Badminton Centre – Badminton
- Lloyd Elsmore Park – Baseball, Rugby union
- AUT University, North Shore Campus – Basketball
- Bruce Pulman Park – Basketball, Touch Football
- The North Shore Events Centre – Basketball
- Lake Pupuke – Canoeing Canoe Polo, Dragon Boating, Canoe Racing and Waka Ama
- Wero – Canoeing Canoe Slalom
- Takapuna Beach – Canoeing Ocean Racing and Waka Ama, Surf Life Saving, Swimming Open Water
- Lake Karapiro – Rowing
- Wynyard Quarter – Cycling Criterium
- Woodhill Mountain Bike Park – Cycling Mountain Biking
- Avantidrome, Cambridge – Cycling Track
- Clevedon Roads – Cycling Road Race
- North Harbour Stadium (QBE Stadium) – Football, Hockey
- Westlake Boys and Girls High School – Football, Hockey
- Akarana Golf Club – Golf
- Muriwai Golf Club – Golf
- Pakuranga Golf Club – Golf
- Remuera Golf Club – Golf
- Carlton Cornwall Bowls – Lawn bowls
- Mt Eden Bowling Club – Lawn bowls
- Auckland Netball Centre – Netball
- Woodhill forest – Orienteering Long distance
- Massey University (Albany Campus) – Orienteering Sprint Model
- The University of Auckland (Epsom Campus) – Orienteering Sprint Qualification
- The University of Auckland (City Campus) – Orienteering Sprint Finals
- Torbay Sailing Club – Sailing
- Waitemata Clay Target Club – Shooting
- North Harbour Softball Stadium – Softball
- Rangitoto College – Softball
- North Shore Squash Club – Squash
- AUT Millennium – Swimming Pool, Weightlifting
- Auckland Table Tennis Centre – Table tennis
- Albany Tennis Centre – Tennis
- Mairangi Bay Beach Volleyball Centre – Volleyball Beach
- West Wave Aquatic Centre – Water polo
- Eden Park – Opening ceremony
- Entertainment Hub Queens Wharf – Closing ceremony

== Winter Games ==
Edition	Year	Host	Sports	Countries	Competitors	Motto
1	2010	(Slovenia) Bled	7	42	3,000	The Games for you
2	2015	(Canada) Quebec City	9	20	1,600	
3	2020	(Austria) Innsbruck	12		3,500	Spirit Together
4	2024	(Italy) Lombardy				
5	2028	(Finland) Lahti				

== Sports ==
2017 Summer Games Sports List (28) :

- Archery
- Athletics
- Badminton
- Baseball
- Basketball
- Canoe
- Cycling
- Football
- Golf
- Hockey
- Lawn Bowls
- Netball
- Orienteering
- Rowing
- Rugby
- Sailing
- Shooting
- Softball
- Squash
- Surf Lifesaving
- Swimming
- Table Tennis
- Tennis
- Touch Football
- Triathlon
- Volleyball
- Water Polo
- Weightlifting

== Americas Masters Games ==
The Americas Masters Games is a regional multi-sport event which involves participants from the Americas region. Governed by the International Masters Games Association (IMGA), the Americas Masters Games is open to participants of all abilities and most ages – the minimum age criterion is 30 years. Participants compete for themselves, instead of their countries. There are no competition qualification requirements apart from the age requirement and membership in that sport's governing body.

The event's first edition was hosted by Vancouver, Canada from 26 August to 4 September 2016. The second edition was scheduled for 2020 in Rio de Janeiro, Brazil but was cancelled due to the COVID-19 outbreak.

== See also ==
- Asia Pacific Masters Games
- European Masters Games
- Americas Masters Games
- Australian Masters Games
- Senior Olympics
- Huntsman World Senior Games
- Masters athletics
