= Gateball =

Japanese mallet team sport based on croquet

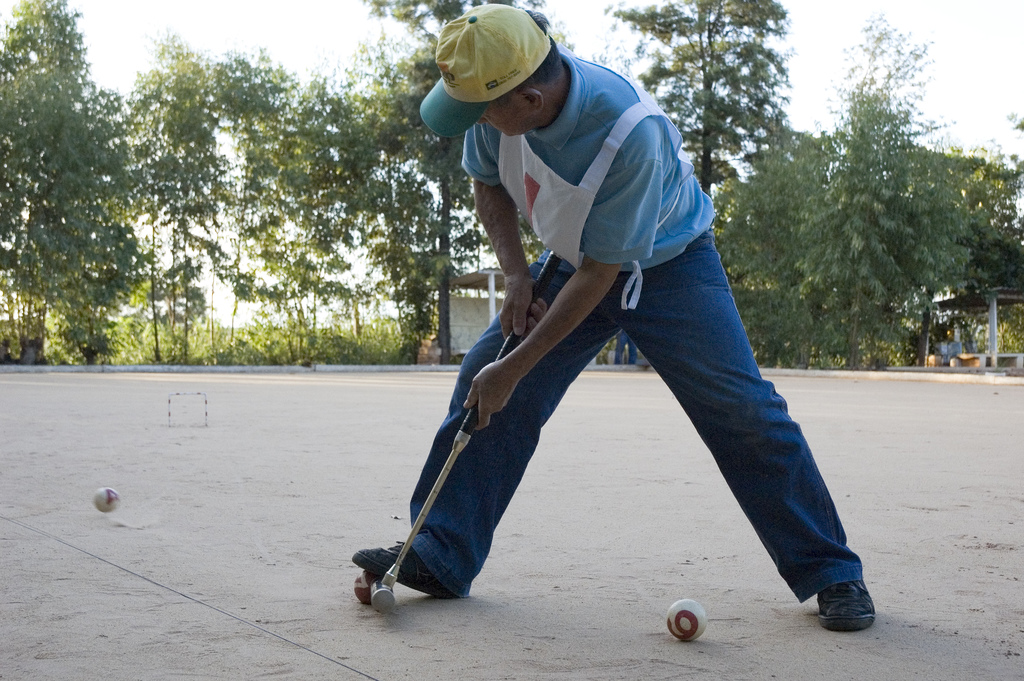
- Playing gateball
- Highest governing body: The World Gateball Union was formed in 1985.
- First played: 1947

Characteristics
- Contact: No
- Team members: Yes
- Mixed-sex: Yes
- Type: Mallet sport
- Equipment: Gateball sticks, gateballs

Presence
- Olympic: No
- World Games: Invitational in 2001

Gateball (Japanese: ゲートボール, Hepburn: gētobōru) is a mallet team sport inspired by croquet. It is a fast-paced, non-contact, highly strategic team game that can be played by anyone regardless of age or gender and is most popular in China, Indonesia, Japan, South Korea and Taiwan with a growing presence in other countries.

== Gameplay ==
Gateball is played between two teams (red and white) of up to five people on a rectangular court 15–20 meters long and 20–25 meters wide, with three gates and a goal pole. The teams play in an alternating fashion with balls numbered 1 to 10 corresponding to their playing order. Odd-numbered balls are red and are played by the red team, even-numbered balls are white and are played by the white team. Each player plays the same ball throughout the game.

At the beginning of the game the players, in order, place their ball in the designated "start area" and attempt to hit the ball through the first gate. If they successfully pass through the gate they may play again. If the player misses the first gate, or their ball passes through the first gate but ends up outside of the court, they pick up their ball and have to try again in the second round. Since the 2015 rule changes, a ball going through the first gate but ending up out of bounds is deemed to have passed the first gate but is an outball and will attempt to enter court on their next turn from the place the ball went outball.

When stroking, if the ball hits another ball, this is called a "touch". If both the stroker's ball and the touched ball remain within the inside line, the stroker shall step on the stroker's ball and place the other touched ball so that it is touching the stroker's ball, and hit the stroker's ball with the stick (this play is called a "spark"), sending the other touched ball off as the result of the impact. By passing through a gate or sparking the ball, a player receives another turn.

One point is given for every gate the ball passes in order and two points for hitting the goal-pole. The winner is the team with the most points at the end of thirty minutes. As the red team always gets to play first, the white team always has the final turn, even if time has elapsed before the final white ball is called.

== History ==
Gateball was invented in Japan by Suzuki Kazunobu in 1947. At the time there was a severe shortage of rubber needed to make the balls used in many sports. Suzuki, then working in the lumber industry on the northern island of Hokkaido, realised there was a ready supply of the wood used to make croquet balls and mallets. He revised the rules of croquet and created gateball as a game for young people.

Gateball first became popular in the late 1950s when a physical education instructor introduced gateball to the women's societies and senior citizens' clubs of Kumamoto City. In 1962, the Kumamoto Gateball Association was formed and established a local set of rules. This version of the game became known nationally when it was demonstrated at a national fitness meet in Kumamoto in 1976. Shortly afterwards gateball's popularity exploded as local government officials and representatives of senior citizens' organisations introduced the sport around the country.

In 1984, the Japanese Gateball Union (JGU) was founded. Under the leadership of its inaugural chairman, Ryoichi Sasakawa, the JGU developed a unified set of rules and organised the first national meet. The following year, the JGU joined with five countries and regions, China, Korea, Brazil, United States of America and Chinese Taipei (Taiwan), to form the World Gateball Union (WGU). The WGU has since been joined by Bolivia (1987), Paraguay (1987), Peru (1987), Argentina (1989), Canada (1989), Singapore (1994), Hong Kong (1998), Australia (2003), Macao (2005), Philippines (2012) and Indonesia (2013).

== World Gateball Union ==
The World Gateball Union was founded in 1985 and have 16 countries members in 2025. In 1986, the first World Gateball Championship (WGU) was held in Hokkaido, the birthplace of Gateball.

== Members ==
16 Nations in March 2025:

1. Asia (9): CHN, JPN, KOR, MAC, HKG, TPE, PHI, THA, INA
2. Oceania (1): AUS
3. Africa (0): –
4. Americas (5): ARG, BRA, USA, PER, PAR
5. Europe (1): SUI

Also have about 30 no member nations.

== Events ==
Gateball originated in Memuro Town, Japan, and was invented by Suzuki Kazunobu in 1947. It is a transformation of the traditional British croquet sport.

The Japan Gateball Union was founded in 1984, and the first All Japan Gateball Championship was held in Tokyo in 1985. It is held every year, and the winning team is awarded the Minister of Education, Culture, Sports, Science and Technology Cup.

=== World Gateball Union ===
The first World Gateball Championship was held at Sapporo's Maruyama Stadium in 1986. It was originally held annually, but is now held every four years.

=== World Gateball Championship ===
In recent years, it has been held once every four years, with the last one taking place in Sao Paulo, Brazil in 2018. A total of 90 teams from 20 countries and regions, including Japan, Australia, Brazil, Canada, China, Hong Kong, Indonesia, South Korea, Macau, Paraguay, Peru, the Philippines, Taiwan, the United States, India, Russia, Switzerland, Thailand, Uruguay, and Europe, participated in the 11th tournament. (Listed in order of IOC code. Europe participated as one region.)

回	年	開催地	優勝チーム
1	1986年	(Japan) 札幌	(Japan) 群馬・高崎下佐野第一
2	1987年	(Japan) 横浜	(Japan) 栃木・大田原さつき
3	1988年	(Brazil) サンパウロ	(Brazil) ドラセーナ
4	1989	(Japan) 名古屋	(Japan) 茨城・竜ヶ崎ドラゴンズ
5	1990年	(South Korea) ソウル	(Taiwan) 宜蘭中興
6	1994年	(Japan) 鹿児島	(Japan) 岩手・グリーンピア友の会
7	1998年	(United States) ホノルル	(Japan) 岩手・グリーンピア友の会
8	2002年	(Japan) 富山	(Japan) 岩手・グリーンピア友の会
9	2006年	(South Korea) 西帰浦	(Japan) 大阪・大阪みどり
10	2010年	(China) 上海	(China) 福建省队
11	2014年	(Japan) 新潟	(China) 山西臨汾代表隊
12	2018年	(Brazil) サンパウロ	(Brazil) ニッポン・カントリー・クラブ

About the postponed of the 13th World Gateball Championship|World Gateball Championships|WGU | World Gateball Union Official Web Site

About the postponed of the 13th World Gateball Championship

In light of these circumstances, it is with the utmost regret that we have decided to postpone the 13th World Gateball Championship until 2026, the year the 14th World Gateball Championship would have been held.

=== Asian Gateball Championship ===
It is held every four years, and in 2012, Friend Sports from Kagoshima Prefecture won the Macau tournament for the third consecutive year. The 2020 tournament will be held in China, but the details have not yet been decided.

回	年	開催地	優勝チーム
1	1992年	(Japan) 金沢	(Japan) 福祉会A
2	1996年	(Japan) 釧路	(Taiwan) 台湾新竹縣東正區A
3	2000年	(China) 上海	(China) 福建省
4	2004年	(Japan) 鹿児島	(Japan) フレンドスポーツB
5	2008年	(Taiwan) 彰化	(Japan) フレンドスポーツクラブ
6	2012年	(Macau) マカオ	(Japan) フレンドスポーツ
7	2016年	(South Korea) 南原	(China) 山東
8	2024年	(China) 杭州	

=== Open Championship ===
==== 2025 ====
2025 Gateball Tournaments Opened for International Players

- 22–23 Aug Sat-Sun The 10th International Gateball Friendship Tournament Memuro - Brazil
- 16–19 Oct Thu-Sun Australian Gateball Championships 2025
- 14–15 Jun Sat-Sun The 2nd Pan American Gateball Championship
- 22–23 Mar Sat-Sun Hong Kong International Gateball Champion

=== South American Championship ===
18th South American Gateball Championship 2019

=== Asian Cities Invitational Gateball Championship ===
The 8th Asian Cities Invitational Gateball Championship in Hong Kong

=== Asia Youth Gateball Championship ===
The 2nd Asia Youth Gateball Championship 2018

=== WGU Chairperson Cup Tournament ===
25th WGU Chairperson Cup Tournament Held in Argentina

=== European Gateball Series ===
2023 Swiss Singles & Doubles Gateball Tournament – September 1-3, 2023 – Swiss Gateball Association

2023 Swiss Singles & Doubles Gateball Tournament - Swiss Gateball

=== Thailand International Gateball Championship ===
【The 7th Thailand International Gateball Championship 2019 】Result

=== Pan American Gateball Championship ===
1st was held in 2023.

=== All Japan Championship ===
38th All Japan Gateball Championship in 2022.

=== Australian Gateball Championships ===
2023, 7 to 10 September.

=== Midori Ward Gateball Union Spring Competition ===
59th Midori Ward Gateball Confederation Spring Competition

=== Gateball Results (Since 2015) ===
Tournaments for 2025 - Gateball Scores

Latest Tournaments - Gateball Scores

== Competitions ==
=== World Games ===
In 2001, gateball was included as an exhibition event at the 6th World Games. The competition was held in Akita Prefecture in Japan and was attended by teams from China, Japan, South Korea, the US and Chinese Taipei. The final was won by a team of mostly teenage players from Japan.

=== World Gateball Championship ===
The World Gateball Championships are held every four years. The inaugural championship in 1986 was played in Hokkaido with teams from Brazil, China, Chinese Taipei, Japan, Korea and the United States of America. Subsequent championships were held in Hawaii (1998); Toyama, Japan (2002); Jeju, South Korea (2006); Shanghai, China( 2010); and Niigata (Japan) in 2014.

The 10th World Championship was played on 17–19 September 2010 in Shanghai China. The competition was contested by 96 teams from 14 countries/regions including Australia, Brazil, China, Chinese Taipei, Hong Kong, India, Japan, Paraguay, the Philippines, South Korea, Russia and the USA.

The 12th World Championship was held in São Paulo In Brazil on 21–23 September in 2018.
