= James Hernandez =

James Hernandez may refer to:

- James Chico Hernandez, American sambo practitioner
- James Hernandez (figure skater), English ice dancer
