= Badger State Games =

Multi-sport event in Wisconsin, United States

- Frequency: Every year
- Inaugurated: 1985
- Headquarters: Wausau/Central Wisconsin Convention & Visitors Bureau; Wausau, Wisconsin
- Website: www.badgerstategames.org

The Badger State Games are a series of annual Olympic-style multi-sport events for amateur athletes from the state of Wisconsin, held twice per year in Wausau. It is a member of the National Congress of State Games. The summer games have been held annually since they began in 1985, originally in Wisconsin's capital city of Madison, then briefly in the Fox Cities area before being relocated to their current home in Wausau in 2012. The winter games have been held in Wausau since they began in 1989. Some sports are represented at both summer and winter editions of the games.

== History ==
The Wisconsin Amateur Sports Corporation, a non-profit organization, began organizing the first edition of the Badger State Games in 1984. The plan was closely associated with Madison's bid for the 1987 National Sports Festival, which was ultimately awarded to Raleigh-Durham, North Carolina. The inaugural Badger State Games were held in Madison in 1985, with ceremonies including an Olympic-style torch relay that circled the state over the course of two weeks. Wisconsin became the sixteenth state to hold a statewide multi-sport event, with the National Congress of State Games created in 1988 to serve as their governing body.

In its first few years, the event continually grew, and was met with enthusiasm from the state government and local businesses who contributed to fundraising efforts. It was consistently held in Madison during the last weekend of June. The first winter games were held in 1989 in Wausau, which exceeded attendance expectations despite temperatures of −10 °F (−23 °C). A special snowmobile-based torch relay was held in anticipation of the Winter Games. These games also continued to be held annually, during the first weekend of February. By the end of the 1980s, the event had grown significantly and eight regional festivals were established to extend opportunities to even more athletes.

Otto Breitenbach became the executive director of the Wisconsin Amateur Sports Corporation in 1988, and he was credited with raising the profile and scope of the games during his nine-year tenure. By 1997, when Breitenbach retired, the Badger State Games was "considered by many to be the current standard bearer" among statewide multi-sport events, and the country's largest relative to state population.

At the 2006 summer games, Bill Wambach of Sun Prairie, Wisconsin, a long-time competitor, broke the national high-jump record for the 80- to 84-year-old division with a jump of 1.26 meters.

In 2007, American Family Insurance became the primary sponsor of the games, and both the winter and summer events were officially renamed the American Family Insurance Badger State Games for two years.

After the 2008 summer games, the Wisconsin Sports Development Corporation announced that the event would leave Madison and move to the Fox Cities region for at least three years. The decision was made after the Fox Cities Sports Authority offered a grant of $180,000, which the Greater Madison Visitors and Convention Bureau refused to compete with. The games had been in decline for several years up to that point, and there was no opening ceremony for the games' final year in Madison because of construction at James Madison Memorial High School.

Following the 2010 Winter Games, the Wausau/Central Wisconsin Convention and Visitors Bureau withdrew its large annual contributions to the event, leaving it without a host city. The 2011 Winter Games were ultimately held at venues across the state, although many were able to remain in the Wausau area. That same year, the Wisconsin Sports Development Corporation announced that it would discontinue the Badger State Games, after operating at a loss for two years. The WSDC stated that the Games had served their purpose, and that the current market for amateur athletic events had become overly saturated, lowering participation in recent years. The Wausau/Central Wisconsin Convention and Visitors Bureau agreed to purchase both the winter and summer games, holding both events in the Wausau area. It was announced that the summer games would not move to Wausau until 2015, following the completion of the WSDC's deal with the Fox Cities Sports Authority, but the 2012 summer games were ultimately held in Wausau.

The Wausau CVB changed the format of both events in 2015, spreading the dozens of events across a period of months rather than holding them all in the same weekend. This allowed for more sports to be represented, and more athletes to participate in more events.

== Sports ==
=== Summer Games ===
As of 2018, the summer games take place over four months and include events in 24 sports.

- 5K run/walk
- Adventure racing
- Archery
- Baseball
- BMX racing
- Bowling
- Cornhole
- Flag football
- Freestyle kayaking
- Golf
- Gymnastics
- Individual time trial
- Lacrosse
- Martial arts
- Pickleball
- Skateboarding
- Soccer
- Softball
- Swimming
- Track and field
- Trap shooting
- Volleyball
- Weightlifting
- Wrestling

=== Winter Games ===
As of 2018, the winter games take place over three months and include events in 21 sports.

- Alpine skiing
- Archery
- Billiards
- Bowling
- Cornhole
- CrossFit
- Curling
- Disc golf
- eSports
- Fat-tire bike racing
- Figure skating
- Ice hockey
- Martial arts
- Nordic skiing
- Pickleball
- Pistol shooting
- Ski jumping
- Snowmobiling
- Snowshoe running
- Table tennis
- Trap shooting

== Editions ==
Summer Games
No.	Dates held	Primary venue	Participants	Sports	Notes
1	July 12 - 14, 1985	Dane County Coliseum; Madison	5,000	17	
2	June 27 - 29, 1986	Camp Randall Stadium; Madison	6,000	22	
3	June 26 - 28, 1987	Camp Randall Stadium; Madison	8,000	22	
4	June 24 - 26, 1988	Wisconsin Field House; Madison	10,000	25	
5	June 23 - 25, 1989	Capitol Square; Madison	12,000	25	
6	June 22 - 24, 1990	Capitol Square; Madison	14,000	24	
7	June 28 - 30, 1991	Wisconsin Field House; Madison	18,000	24	
8	June 26 - 28, 1992	Capitol Square; Madison	15,000	24	
9	June 25 - 27, 1993	Capitol Square; Madison	20,000	25	
10	June 24 - 26, 1994	Wisconsin Field House; Madison	18,000	24	
11	June 23 - 25, 1995	Mansfield Stadium; Memorial High School; Madison	25,266	24	
12	June 28 - 30, 1996	Mansfield Stadium; Memorial High School; Madison	22,000	26	
13	June 27 - 29, 1997	Mansfield Stadium; Memorial High School; Madison	20,500	26	
14	June 26 - 28, 1998	Mansfield Stadium; Memorial High School; Madison	20,000	26	
15	June 25 - 27, 1999	Verona Area High School; Verona	18,000	26	
16	June 22 - 25, 2000	Verona Area High School; Verona	20,000	27	
17	June 22 - 24, 2001	Verona Area High School; Verona	20,000	27	
18	June 27 - 30, 2002	Verona Area High School; Verona	16,000	26	
19	June 27 - 30, 2003	Verona Area High School; Verona	14,000	26	
20	June 24 - 27, 2004	Verona Area High School; Verona	10,400	28	
21	June 17 - 26, 2005	Verona Area High School; Verona	16,000	28	
22	June 17 - 25, 2006	Mansfield Stadium; Memorial High School; Madison	16,000	28	
23	June 15 - 24, 2007	Mansfield Stadium; Memorial High School; Madison	10,000	30	
24	June 27 - 29, 2008	Mansfield Stadium; Memorial High School; Madison	8,045	30	
25	June 26 - 28, 2009	Titan Stadium; Oshkosh	6,268	25	
26	June 25 - 27, 2010	Titan Stadium; Oshkosh	5,480	25	
27	June 16 - 26, 2011	Titan Stadium; Oshkosh	5,000	19	
28	June 22 - 24, 2012	Wausau	1,000	3	
29	June 15 - 30, 2013	Wausau	1,300	11	
30	June 14 - 29, 2014	Wausau	1,400	15	
31	June 12 - 28, 2015	Wausau	1,500	18	
32	May 6 - August 20, 2016	Wausau	2,000	22	
33	May 4 - August 26, 2017	Wausau		26	
34	May 4 - August 19, 2018	Wausau		24	

Winter Games
No.	Dates held	Primary venue	Participants	Sports	Notes
1	February 3 - 5, 1989	Rib Mountain State Park; Wausau	1,614	5	
2	February 2 - 4, 1990	Rib Mountain State Park; Wausau	2,432	8	
3	February 1 - 3, 1991	Rib Mountain State Park; Wausau	2,607	9	
4	January 31 - February 2, 1992	Rib Mountain State Park; Wausau	3,854	8	
5	February 5 - 7, 1993	Marathon Park; Wausau	4,200	8	
6	February 4 - 6, 1994	Marathon Park; Wausau	4,600	8	
7	February 3 - 5, 1995	Marathon Park; Wausau	5,004	9	
8	February 2 - 4, 1996	Marathon Park; Wausau	5,376	9	
9	January 31 - February 2, 1997	Marathon Park; Wausau	5,378	9	
10	February 6 - 8, 1998	Marathon Park; Wausau	5,500	10	
11	February 5 - 7, 1999	Marathon Park; Wausau	5,833	10	
12	February 4 - 6, 2000	Marathon Park; Wausau	6,298	10	
13	February 3 - 5, 2001	Marathon Park; Wausau	6,391	10	
14	February 1 - 3, 2002	Marathon Park; Wausau	4,000	7	
15	January 31 - February 2, 2003	Marathon Park; Wausau	4,115	8	
16	January 31 - February 8, 2004	Marathon Park; Wausau	4,123	14	
17	February 4 - 6, 2005	Cedar Creek Village Mall; Wausau	4,000	13	
18	January 27 - February 5, 2006	Cedar Creek Village Mall; Wausau	4,000	16	
19	February 2 - 4, 2007	Cedar Creek Village Mall; Wausau	4,400	13	
20	January 26 - February 3, 2008	Rothschild Pavilion; Rothschild	5,000	18	
21	January 24 - February 8, 2009	Rothschild Pavilion; Rothschild	4,300	18	
22	January 23 - February 7, 2010	CitySquare; Wausau	4,000	18	
23	January 21 - February 6, 2011	statewide	4,000	20	
24	January 21 - February 5, 2012	Wausau	1,400	7	
25	January 19 - February 3, 2013	Wausau	1,500	8	
26	January 18 - February 2, 2014	Wausau	1,800	13	
27	January 17 - February 1, 2015	Wausau	2,000	13	
28	January 16 - 30, 2016	Wausau	2,000	8	
29	January 6 - March 12, 2017	Wausau		24	
30	January 5 - April 28, 2018	Wausau		21	
