= Texas Amateur Athletic Federation =

- Sport: Multi-sport
- Category: Amateur
- Jurisdiction: Texas
- Abbreviation: TAAF
- Founded: 1925
- Affiliation: National Congress of State Games
- Headquarters: Georgetown, Texas, U.S.
- President: Jeff Goodman
- CEO: Mark Lord
- Secretary: Kathleen McGrath

Official website
- www.taaf.com

The Texas Amateur Athletic Federation (sometimes referred to as TAAF) is a nonprofit amateur sports organization based in Georgetown, Texas that conducts competitions across the U.S. state of Texas. It is made up of over 140 organizations and 210,000 individuals. The organization's premier events are the Games of Texas, which consist of the Summer and Winter Games held each year during their respective seasons.

== Regions ==
The state is divided into 17 regions, each with its own regional director, member cities, and affiliates.

- Region 1 – Houston and coastal cities
- Region 2 – The Valley
- Region 3 – South Central Texas
- Region 4 – Cities surrounding Fort Worth
- Region 5 – Central Texas
- Region 6 – East Texas
- Region 7 – Cities surrounding Dallas
- Region 8 – North Texas (Oklahoma Border)
- Region 9 – West Texas (Panhandle)
- Region 10 – West Texas
- Region 11 – City of Austin
- Region 12 – City of Fort Worth
- Region 13 – City of Dallas
- Region 14 – City of Houston
- Region 15 – City of San Antonio
- Region 16 – Far Southeast Texas (Coastline)
- Region 17 – City of El Paso

== Games of Texas ==
TAAF conducts the Summer Games of Texas in late July and the Winter Games in January of each year. Started in 1986, the Summer Games are the largest multi-sport event in Texas and have been hosted by various cities across the state. The 2019 Games will be hosted by College Station and Bryan, TX, and the 2020 Games will hosted by Corpus Christi, TX. The Winter Games were created in 2006 and have been hosted since their inception by the city of Frisco, Texas.

== Sport education ==
In addition to certification programs for coaches, parents, and officials, TAAF conducts the Sport Management School (sometimes referred to as SMS University) along with the Texas Recreation and Park Society. The goal of the two-year program is to train coaches, administrators, and parks and recreation directors to become TAAF Certified Professional Sports Managers (C.P.S.M.) TAAF is also affiliated with the Aquafina Major League Baseball Pitch, Hit & Run program; the NFL Punt, Pass, and Kick program; and the Hershey's Track and Field Games.

== Awards ==
Each year, the TAAF Foundation gives out three types of scholarships: for athletes (past and present), for college students majoring in Parks and Recreation, and for a graduating high school seniors or college students majoring in the sports sciences.

- The TAAF Hall of Fame was established in 1994 to recognize those players, coaches, officials, or administrators who have greatly contributed to the organization and their sport.
- Since 1978, TAAF has given the Koger Stokes Award to a TAAF officeholder with at least 10 years of membership.
- TAAF Members with a minimum of ten years of membership in the organization who have served on at least one committee and are retired are eligible to receive a TAAF Lifetime Membership.
- The Susan Gerred Young Professional Award (previously the Young Professional Award) is awarded to a sports professional under 35 years old.
- The Member City Award is given to three TAAF member cities each year in different population ranges: 34,999 and under, 35,000 – 74,999, and 75,000 and over.
- TAAF awards the Service Award to an individual or organization who has had an affiliation with TAAF for at least five years.
