= Bay State Games =

Amateur multi-sport event in Massachusetts

- Sport: Multiple sports
- Category: Amateur
- Jurisdiction: Massachusetts
- Abbreviation: BSG
- Founded: 1982
- Affiliation: National Congress of State Games
- Location: Woburn, Massachusetts
- Chairperson: Phil Gloudemans
- Other key staff: Kevin Cummings, Executive Director; Erika Sheinhait, Director of Communications; Alanis Tirabassi, Director of Operations

Official website
- www.baystategames.org

The Bay State Games are an Olympic-style athletic event for amateur athletes in the state of Massachusetts, which includes several divisions and allows athletes of all ages to compete. The Games are divided into Summer and Winter Games. The Summer Games include 25 sports and are usually held in late July. The Winter Games include three different sports and are usually held in late January or early February. The Bay State Games is a member of the National Congress of State Games. Kevin Cummings currently serves as executive director.

== Overview ==
The Massachusetts Amateur Sports Foundation (MASF), organizer of the Bay State Summer and Winter Games, provides Olympic-style athletic competitions and developmental programs for Massachusetts amateur athletes of all ages and abilities. The MASF operates statewide and year-round to promote personal development, education, physical fitness, teamwork, sportsmanship, and mutual respect. The MASF is a member of the National Congress of State Games, which comprises 35 states nationwide that conduct State Games events.

In 2019, the Bay State Summer Games celebrated its 38th anniversary. In 2020, the Bay State Winter Games enjoyed its 35th year. From a modest beginning of four sports and 300 athletes, the Games have grown to include almost 6,000 athletes in 35 different sports from more than 300 Massachusetts cities and towns. Each sport is organized according to national governing body rules. Age and skill divisions have been created to allow medal opportunities for a broad range of athletes.

The Bay State Games is one of the largest amateur multi-sports organizations in the state of Massachusetts. This non-profit organization is a member of the National Congress of State Games, associated with the United States Olympic Committee and its Affiliated Organization Council. The Bay State Games' mission is to promote personal development, education, health, physical fitness, teamwork and sportsmanship through recreational and educational programs. Over 6,000 Massachusetts residents ranging in age from 6 to 86 participate in these programs each year. Each year, the Bay State Games has over 1,000 volunteer including coaches, referees, and medical staff.

== History ==
The Bay State Games was founded by Dave McGillivray in 1982. McGillivray was on the Governor's Council of Physical Fitness and Sports and wanted to create a statewide summer sports festival for Massachusetts. He appointed Doug Arnot to pitch the idea of "Sportsfest" to the commonwealth of Massachusetts and to become the executive director (1982-1992). "Sportsfest" began with only four sports with 500 athletes. Peter Thomsen (1992-1996), Charlie Noonan (1996-1998), Linda Driscoll (1998-1999), and Kevin Cummings (1999-present) have all served as executive director.

The Games' breakthrough year came in 1985. Basketball became the Game's showcase event in both women's and men's divisions. That same year, Arnot developed the idea of creating a winter sports festival for Massachusetts athletes. The Winter Games took place in the Northern Berkshire region because of the facilities available to them. Four hundred athletes took part in the 1985 Winter Games with competitions that included figure skating, alpine skiing, cross country skiing, and speed skating. Figure skating is the only sport to be included in every Winter Games. Masters ice hockey, youth ice hockey, speed skating, ski orienteering, snowboarding, sled dog racing, and cross country skiing were added into the competitions as the Winter Games became more successful.

== Winter Games ==
The Winter Games are usually held in the months of January, February, and March in the Northern Berkshire region of Massachusetts. Featured sports include figure skating, curling, masters ice hockey, and futsal. Each year, the Winter Games have featured the Bay State Skate Figure Skating Show. This show was created in the 1980s to display some of the best skaters in the Winter Games. The Bay State Skate has more than a dozen Olympic skaters from the national and world championships. Shows presented by the Bay State Games have included Olympians Nancy Kerrigan, Paul Wylie, Surya Bonaly, Linda Frattiani, Sylvia Fontana, and national competitors Mark Mitchell and Jennifer Kirk. The athletes in the Winter Games represent over 200 Massachusetts communities and participants range from ages 5 to 62.

Events (as of 2020)

- Curling
- Figure Skating
- Futsal
- Ice hockey

== Summer Games ==
The Summer Games is Massachusetts' own Olympic-style athletic competition that has been held since 1982 and features more than 6,000 athletes in 30 sports. athletes represent over 300 Massachusetts communities, and participants range in age from 5 to 86. The Bay States Games reached it popularity in the 1990s when the number of participants increased to over 10,000 athletes. Over the years, the Bay State Games has expanded and focused more on individual sports such as swimming and track and field. Also, rugby has been one of the Games' fastest growing sports. Master divisions were created and recreational sports such as baton twirling, judo, table tennis, and badminton. The Summer Games span is six to seven weeks in June and July. Tryouts for the Summer Games are held throughout the month of June, with finals taking place in the Metro-Boston and central Massachusetts area in mid-July.

Events (as of 2020)

- Archery
- Badminton
- Baseball
- Basketball
- Baton Twirling
- Fencing
- Field Hockey
- 6 vs 6 Field Hockey
- Basic Skills Figure Skating
- Footgolf
- Ice hockey
- Judo
- Lacrosse
- Pickleball
- Rugby Sevens
- Shooting Sports - Pistol, Trap, Rifle
- Soccer
- Softball
- Swimming
- Synchronized Swimming
- Table Tennis
- Track & Field
- Ultimate
- Volleyball
- Weightlifting
- Wrestling

== Programs ==
=== Future Leaders Scholarship Program ===
The Future Leaders Scholarship annually awards six $1,000 college scholarships to Bay State Summer and Winter Games participants. The MASF is proud to award these scholarships to student-athletes who demonstrate leadership through community service, academic excellence and athletic achievement. Since its inception, more than $400,000 has been awarded to students who have gone on to successful careers at prestigious institutions.

=== High School Ambassador Program ===
The High School Ambassador program works with high school students who are interested in a career in marketing or sport management. Ambassadors actively promote Bay State Games in their schools by hanging up posters, meeting with athletic directors and coaches, and sharing posts on social media.

=== Internship Program ===
The Bay State Games Internship Program offers candidates the opportunity to gain valuable experience in all phases of sport management. Interns will have the opportunity to learn about event management, financial management, operations, sponsorship fulfillment, and media relations. Unlike many other internships, the Bay State Games Internship Program allows candidates to take ownership of specific projects and manage events. Alumni of the BSG Internship Program have gone onto careers professional and collegiate sports, including the New York Jets, Miami Dolphins, and the Big East Conference,

=== Sports Medicine Symposium ===
In conjunction with Boston Children's Hospital Division of Sports Medicine, the MASF sponsors an annual sports medicine conference to educate athletic trainers and sports medicine professionals on current trends in the field. Participants earn continuing education units to maintain their certification.

== Bay State Games Hall of Fame ==
The Bay State Games Hall of Fame recognizes athletes, volunteers, coaches, officials, organizers and commissioners who have had an extraordinary impact on the people and communities that are a part of the Games. Inductees include former Bay State Games athletes who competed in the Olympics, NBA, NHL, or MLB.

Class of 2019

- Yvonne Chern – BSG badminton co-commissioner
- Beth Sopka – BSG badminton co-commissioner
- Orlando Vandross – BSG basketball athlete & coach, asst. coach Virginia NCAA Men Basketball National Champions
- Charlie Titus – BSG Board member

Class of 2018

- Samantha Livingstone – BSG swimming athlete, NCAA Champion, 2000 US Olympic gold medalist
- Tara Danielson – BSG field hockey athlete, US National Team, head coach Stanford field hockey
- Denis Reno – BSG weightlifting co-commissioner
- Dave Lussier – BSG weightlifting co-commissioner

Class of 2017

- Tom Thibodeau – BSG basketball coach. NBA head coach, Chicago, Minnesota, New York
- Chris Lane – BSG track & field officials coordinator
- David Blake – BSG fencing commissioner

Class of 2016

- Jim Carboneau – BSG lacrosse officials coordinator
- Tracey Gangi Johnson – BSG baton twirling commissioner
- Dr. Arthur Pappas – BSG board member & chair

Class of 2015

- David Harrison – BSG board member
- Joe LeMar – BSG track athlete, board member, Paralympic Games gold medal 1992, bronze 2000.
- Greg Derr – BSG shooting athlete, US 1996 Olympic shooting team member

Class of 2014

- Dr. Lyle Micheli – BSG medical team
- Dr. Pierre D'Hemecourt – BSG medical team
- Bill Cleary – BSG board member, Harvard athletic director, Olympic ice hockey silver medalist
- Keith Yandle – BSG ice hockey athlete, 15 year NHL veteran, 3 time all star

Class of 2013

- Katy Hayden – BSG figure skating commissioner
- Rich Hill – BSG baseball athlete, 18-year MLB player
- Jack Sordillo – BSG board member

Class of 2012

- Rick Meara – BSG judo commissioner
- New Balance – sponsor
- Elena Pirozhkova – BSG wrestling athlete, 2012 Olympic Team & world champion

Class of 2011

- Carlos Pena – BSG baseball athlete, MLB player & All-Star
- Ted Neill – BSG wrestling officials coordinator
- Carol Kronopolus – BSG field hockey officials coordinator

Class of 2010

- Jim Fanning – BSG softball commissioner & officials coordinator
- Patty Flanagan – BSG synchronized swimming commissioner
- Jack Aborn – BSG archery commissioner

Class of 2009

- Bill Guerin – BSG hockey athlete & gold medalist. NHL, two-time Stanley Cup Champion
- Ann Welch – BSG volunteer
- Bob McCorry – BSG shooting commissioner
- Peter Buxton – BSG board member

Class of 2008

- Sarah Behn - Second leading scorer in Massachusetts girls basketball history, All-American at Boston College, leading scorer in Big East Conference women's basketball history.
- Mike Burns - College soccer All American, member of 1992 US Olympic Men's Soccer Team, member of 1998 US World Cup Soccer Team, 7-year player for MLS Soccer
- Joe Chirico - diving commissioner
- Rachel Woo - Bay State Games soccer officials coordinator

Class of 2007

- Nancy Kerrigan - Participant in first BSG figure skating event in 1985. Two-time Olympian.
- Dave Marcus - table tennis commissioner.
- Joe Cacciatore - baseball umpire commissioner
- Bruce McAndrews - Member of Winter Games organizing committee for over 20 years.

Class of 2006

- Dana Barros - Two time BSG basketball medalist. 13-year NBA veteran and NBA all-star.
- Doug Arnot - Founded Bay State Games in 1982 and served as executive director from 1982 to 1992
- Athletic Trainers of Massachusetts - Supported BSG since 1982 for medical coverage.
- Rich Moran - 20-year Summer Games volunteer.

Class of 2005

- Kelly Dostal - BSG field hockey athlete, 3 time NCAA champion and player of the year.
- Jim Maher - Wrestling commissioner
- Louise Wing - 22-year synchro swimming athlete, National State Games Athlete of the Year.
- Diane Wilcox - 24-year volunteer

Class of 2004

- UMass Boston - Host of Summer Finals for 20 years
- Jeanne King - 20-year volunteer from Verizon
- Jimmy Pedro - Bay State Games wrestling athlete, 4 time Olympian in *Judo

Class of 2003

- Tom Lynch - Ice hockey officials coordinator
- Jim Underwood - Soccer commissioner
- Rebecca Lobo - Two=time BSG basketball medalist, Olympic medalist & NCAA champion.

Class of 2002

- Reggie Lewis - Two-time BSG basketball medalist, former member Boston Celtics.
- Leda Levine - Field hockey commissioner
- Barb Cece - Figure skating commissioner

Class of 2001

- Charlie Butterfield - Track & field commissioner
- Rob Garon - Swimming commissioner
- Melissa Mulloy-Mecozzi - shooting athlete, member Olympic shooting team

=== Notable Bay State Games alumni ===
- Dana Barros
  - Bay State Summer Games boys scholastic & men's open basketball athlete
  - Played for Boston College. 1988 Big East 1st team selection. BC number retired
  - Played in NBA from 1989 – 2004
  - 1995 NBA All-Star
- Surya Bonaly
  - 1999 Bay State Skate Figure Skating Show performer
  - 1992, 1994 and 1998 French Olympic Figure Skating Team member
- Michael Botticelli and Cheryl Franks
  - Bay State Skate Figure Skating Show performers
  - 1980 U.S. Pairs Figure Skating Olympic Team members
- Mike Burns
  - Bay State Summer Games boys' scholastic soccer athlete
  - 1992 U.S. Olympic Soccer Team member
  - 1996-2002 MLS Player
  - Member of the 1998 U.S. World Cup Soccer Team
- Kitty Carruthers and Peter Carruthers
  - Bay State Skate Figure Skating Show performers
  - 1980 and 1984 U.S. Pairs Figure skating Olympic Team members
- Karen Cashman
  - Bay State Winter Games figure Skating competitor
  - 1994 U.S. Olympic Speed Skating bronze medalist (3000m relay)
- Pat Connaughton
  - Bay State Games baseball athlete
  - Played for University of Notre Dame in baseball & basketball
  - 2014 MLB Draft 4th Round Pick for Baltimore Orioles
  - 2015 NBA Draft 2nd Round Pick for New Jersey Nets
  - Currently plays for the Milwaukee Bucks
  - Currently plays for the Milwaukee Bucks (NBA)
- Jim Craig
  - Bay State Winter Games Masters ice hockey athlete
  - 1980 U.S. Olympic Ice Hockey Team member
- Bill Curley
  - Bay State Summer Games boys' scholastic and men's athlete basketball athlete
  - 1994 to 1998 NBA Player
  - Head Coach Emerson College Men's Basketball Team
- Tara Danielson
  - Bay State Games field hockey athlete
  - U.S. Field Hockey National Team member 1998-2005
  - Competed in Pan American Games, World Cup, and Olympic Qualifiers
  - Former head Coach of Stanford University Field Hockey Team
- Greg Derr
  - Bay State Summer Games shooting competitor
  - 1996 U.S. Olympic Shooting Team member
  - 6-time member of the US Shooting Team at the world championships
- Kelly Dostal
  - Bay State Summer Games scholastic field hockey athlete
  - Three-time All-American and national champion at Wake Forest (2002–04)
  - 2016 Inductee to Wake Forest University Athletic Hall of Fame
- Philip Dulebohn and Tiffany Scott
  - Bay State Skate Figure Skating Show performers
  - Bay State Winter Games figure skating competitor (Scott)
  - 2002 U.S. Pairs figure skating Olympic Team members
- Howard Eisley
  - Bay State Summer Games men's open basketball athlete
  - Member of the Boston College men's basketball team
  - NBA Player (1994-1996)
- Scott Gregory and Suzanne Semanick
  - Bay State Skate Figure Skating Show performers
  - Bay State Winter Games figure skating athlete (Semanick)
  - 1988 U.S. ice dancing Olympic Team members
- Bill Guerin
  - Bay State Summer Games boys' scholastic ice hockey athlete & gold medalist
  - 1998, 2002, and 2006 U.S. ice hockey Olympic Team member
  - 18-year NHL Veteran
  - Two-time Stanley Cup Champion, four-time NHL All-Star, and league MVP in 2001
- James Chico Hernandez
  - Bay State Summer Games wrestling competitor
  - Five-time U.S. Sambo National Team member (2000–2005)
  - World Cup sambo vice-champion (2000)
- Rich Hill
  - Bay State Games baseball athlete
  - 18-year MLB veteran
- David Jensen
  - Bay State Winter Games Masters ice hockey athlete
  - 1984 U.S. Olympic Ice Hockey Team member
- Nancy Kerrigan
  - 1985 Bay State Winter Games figure skating competitor
  - 1992 Bay State Skate Figure Skating Show performer
  - 1992 and 1994 U.S. Olympic figure skating medalist
- Joe Lemar
  - Bay State Games Track & Field athlete
  - Bay State Games board member
  - 1992 Barcelona Paralympics gold medalist
  - 2000 Sydney Paralympics bronze medalist
- Reggie Lewis
  - 1985 and 1986 Bay State Summer Games men's open basketball athlete
  - NBA Player - Boston Celtics (1987-1993)
- Samantha Livingstone
  - Bay State Games Swimming gold medalist
  - 2000 Sydney Olympic Swimming gold medalist
  - Seven-time NCAA All-American Women's Swimming
  - Co-Captain University of Georgia 2005 NCAA Women's Swimming National Championship Team
- Rebecca Lobo
  - Bay State Summer Games girl's scholastic basketball athlete
  - 1995 NCAA Women's Basketball National Champion
  - 1996 U.S. Olympic Basketball Team member
  - 1997 to 2003 WNBA Player
- Melissa Malloy
  - Bay State Summer Games shooting competitor
  - 2000 U.S. Olympic Shooting Team member
- Kevin McGlinchy
  - Bay State Summer Games baseball athlete
  - MLB Player - Atlanta Braves (1999-2000)
- Jimmy Pedro
  - Bay State Summer Games wrestling competitor
  - Four-time U.S. Olympic Judo Team member (1992, 96, 2000, 04)
  - Two-time Olympic silver medalist (1996, 2004)
- Carlos Pena
  - Bay State Games Baseball athlete
  - 13-year MLB Veteran
  - 2009 MLB All-Star
  - 2009 AL Home Run Leader
- Elena Pirozhkova
  - Bay State Games Wrestling athlete
  - 2012 & 2016 member of U.S. Olympic Women's Wrestling Team
  - World Women's Wrestling Championships - Gold (2012), Silver (2010 & 2014), Bronze (2013)
  - Pan American Championship gold medalist 2008, 2009, and 2010
- Stephen Scherer
  - Bay State Summer Games shooting competitor
  - 2008 U.S. Olympic Shooting Team member
- Krista Schmidinger
  - 1985 Bay State Winter Games Alpine Skiing athlete
  - 1992 and 1994 U.S. Alpine Skiing Olympic Team member
- Nikki Stone
  - Bay State Winter Games Alpine skiing competitor
  - 1998 U.S. Olympic Aerial Skiing Team member
- Tom Thibodeau
  - Bay State Games basketball coach
  - Former assistant coach - Boston Celtics
  - Former head coach - Chicago Bulls, Minnesota Timberwolves
  - Current head coach - New York Knicks
- Orlando Vandross
  - Bay State Games basketball athlete and men's open basketball coach
  - Previously served as assistant men's basketball coach at Boston University and Charlotte University
  - Currently serves as assistant coach at University of Virginia.
  - Member of the coaching staff that won the 2019 Division I Men's Basketball National Championship
- Kara Wolters
  - Bay State Summer Games girls' scholastic basketball athlete
  - 2000 U.S. Olympic Basketball Team member
  - WNBA Player (1999-2003)
- Nicole Woods
  - Bay State Games field hockey athlete
  - Four-year field hockey player at University of Louisville, 3-time Al-ACC selection
  - Member of the U.S. Field Hockey National Team
- Paul Wylie
  - 1992 Bay State Skate Figure Skating Show performer
  - 1992 U.S. Olympic figure skating silver medalist
- Keith Yandle
  - Bay State Games ice hockey athlete
  - 15-year NHL veteran
  - 3-time NHL All-Star
