= Games of Texas =

Multi-sport event in Texas, United States

- Games of Texas logo
- Motto: "The Original State Championship of Texas"
- Frequency: Annual
- Inaugurated: 1986
- President: Jeff Goodman
- Headquarters: Georgetown, Texas
- Website: www.taaf.com

The Games of Texas are a series of amateur Olympic-style events held each summer and winter in the U.S. state of Texas. They are organized by the Texas Amateur Athletic Federation (TAAF) and are part of the National Congress of State Games. Medalists from the Games qualify to participate in the State Games of America, a biennial multi-sport event.

== Summer Games ==
The Summer Games of Texas are held every year across multiple venues in a pre-designated city or region. The event is usually held in late July and draws more than 10,000 athletes and 15,000–20,000 spectators each year. It is the largest multi-sport event in Texas. Each year at the games, TAAF organizes the opening ceremonies, which typically include a parade of athletes and fireworks. In 2010 and 2011, the event was hosted by Waco, Texas. In 2012 and 2013, it was hosted by Corpus Christi, Texas.

=== Sports contested ===
Though most "core" sports are held each year at the games, host cities will sometimes add region-specific sports to the games they host.

The 2026 Summer Games of Texas will be hosted in Bryan and College Station, the ninth time which they have been hosted there. Athletes will compete in 11 sports:

- Archery
- Boxing
- Futsal
- Golf
- Horseshoes
- Pickleball
- Soccer
- Swimming
- Tennis
- Track and field
- Ultimate frisbee

== Winter Games ==
Since their inception in 2006, the Winter Games of Texas have been held in Frisco, Texas.

=== Sports contested ===
The 2026 TAAF Winter Games will take place in Victoria, Texas. Athletes will compete in 10 sports:

- Cornhole
- Disc golf
- E-sports
- Flag Football
- Gymnastics
- Golf
- Swimming
- Tennis
- Wheelchair basketball
- Youth fastpitch softball
