= Dave McGillivray =

American sports businessman

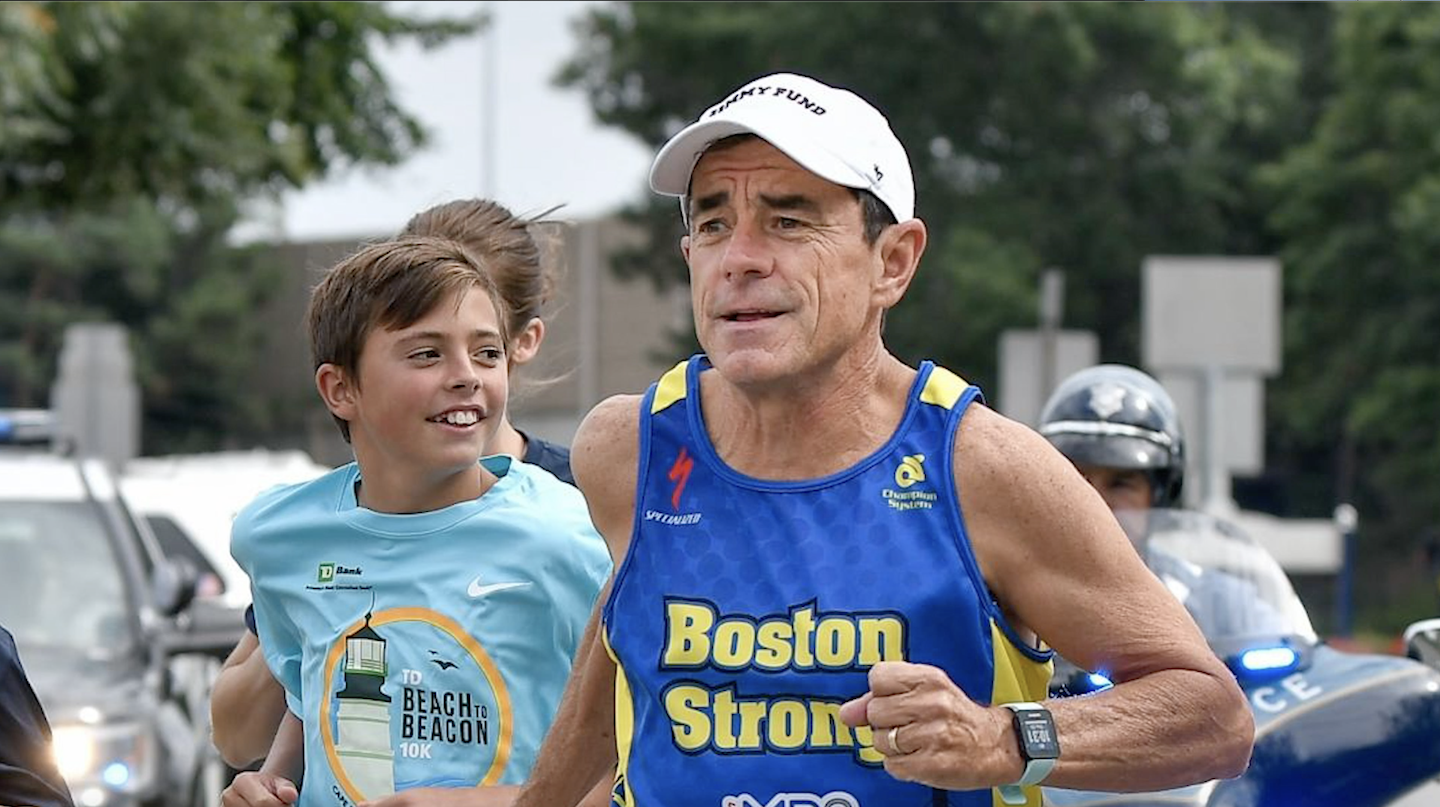
Dave McGillivray running alongside son, Luke, during the celebratory run from Medford, Massachusetts, to Fenway Park to commemorate the 40th anniversary of McGillvray's run across America

Dave McGillivray is an American road race director, entrepreneur, philanthropist, motivational speaker, author, and athlete.

McGillivray is the founder and president of DMSE Sports, Inc., a full-service event-management organization. McGillivray has directed or consulted on more than 1,400 events throughout the world including the Boston Athletic Association (B.A.A.) Boston Marathon, the Beach to Beacon 10K, the ASICS Falmouth Road Race, the Mount Washington Road Race, the Olympic Marathon trials, and the Olympic Games.

McGillivray is the founder of the Dave McGillivray Finish Strong Foundation, which seeks to inspire and empower youth to increase physical activity, expand literacy, and build community and self-esteem through running, reading, and acts of kindness. McGillivray has given more than 1,400 motivational talks and he presented a Ted Talk. He is the author of four autobiographical books.

McGillivray has completed 173 marathons, including 53 consecutive Boston Marathons. In 1978, he completed an 80-day trek across the United States, running the 3,452 miles from Medford, Ore., to Medford, Mass. to benefit the Jimmy Fund and Dana-Farber Cancer Institute.

== Life ==
McGillivray is a graduate of Medford High School and Merrimack College, both of which named him valedictorian. McGillivray was born and raised in Medford, and now resides in North Andover, Mass. He is married with five children.

== Athletic achievements ==
In 1978, McGillivray gained recognition for his athleticism when he ran across the U.S. from Medford, Oregon, to his hometown of Medford, Massachusetts. Over the course of 80 days, he ran a distance of 3,452 miles, averaging 45–50 miles a day for the majority of the journey. He culminated his cross-America run by running into in Fenway Park in Boston. His effort raised funds for the Jimmy Fund and Dana-Farber Cancer Institute.

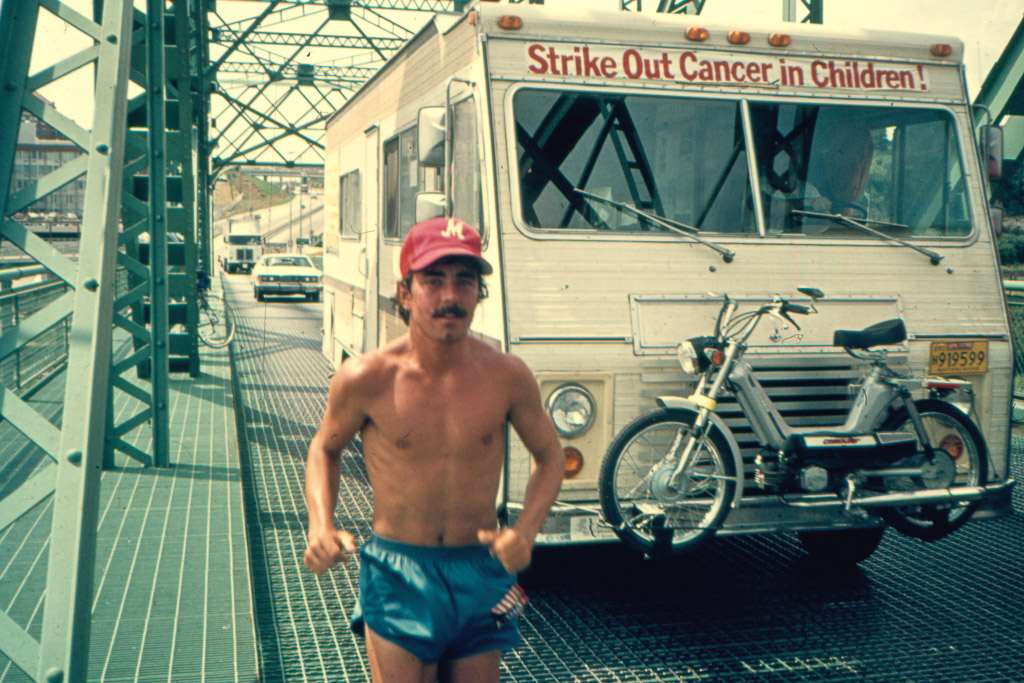
Dave McGillivray runs across the Mississippi River bridge during his 1978 run across America

In 1980, McGillivray completed several athletic endeavors.

- His Wrentham State School 24-Hour Run traversed 120 miles in 24 hours through 31 communities in southeastern Massachusetts, ending in Foxboro Stadium at halftime of a New England Patriots game. It was held to benefit the Wrentham State School, and the event raised more than $10,000 for the handicapped.
- He ran the East Coast Run to once again benefit the Jimmy Fund. From Winter Haven, Florida, to Boston, Massachusetts, McGillivray ran 1,520 miles and was joined by Robert Hall, a pioneer of wheelchair marathoning. While in Washington, D.C., the duo met with President Jimmy Carter at the White House.
- He entered his first Hawaii Ironman Triathlon. He finished 14th in the competition, and was the 30th person to have ever completed an Ironman, an individual endurance event consisting of three back-to-back distance events: a 2.4 mile rough, open ocean water swim, followed by a 112-mile bike race and finishing up with a 26.2-mile marathon run He would go on to complete eight more Hawaii Ironmans over his career.

In 1981, McGillivray:

- Ran in the Empire State Building Run-Up, an 86-story, 1,575-step run. He placed 10th overall with a time of 13 minutes, 27 seconds.
- Ran the Boston Marathon in 3:14 while blindfolded and being escorted by two guides to raise $10,000 for the Carroll Center for the Blind in Newton, Massachusetts.
- He completed the New England Run where he triathloned (ran, cycled, and swam) 1,522 miles throughout the six New England states and finished in Foxboro Stadium. The event required a run up and down Mount Washington, running three miles alongside inmates within the Walpole State Prison, and swimming two miles across Lake Winneapesaukee, both in New Hampshire. He raised $55,000 for the Jimmy Fund.
- A year later he swam more than seven miles from Martha's Vineyard to Falmouth, Massachusetts, raising funds for the Jimmy Fund.
- He formed the first sanctioned running club inside a maximum security institution at Walpole State Prison in Massachusetts. He conducted and ran in numerous distance races inside the prison yard, including completing and winning a full 26.2 mile marathon against inmates.

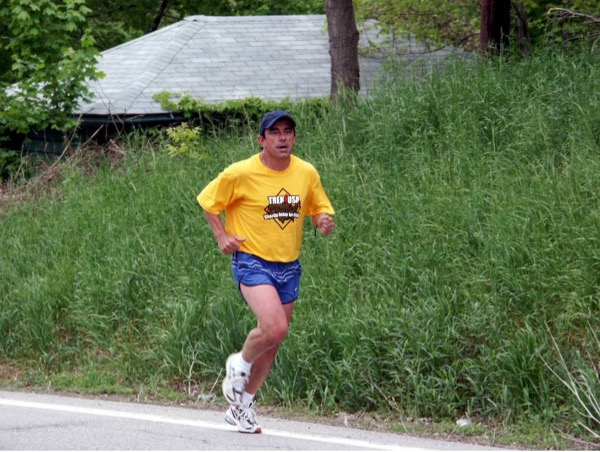
Dave McGillivray runs with the TREK team

During the rest of the 1980s, he continued to combine his love of athletic endeavors and fundraising for charity.

- In 1983, he completed 24-hour swim in the Olympic-size Medford High School pool, which totaled 1,884 lengths and covering 27 miles, again raising funds for the Jimmy Fund.
- Also in 1983, McGillivray cycled more than 1,000 miles throughout six New England states in 14 days to raise money for a scholarship fund for his alma mater, Merrimack College.
- In 1986, McGillivray biked again for 24 consecutive hours around a five-mile loop course in Medford, Massachusetts while simultaneously directing the annual Bay State Triathlon being held on the course at the same time. He covered a total of 385 miles, again raising money for the Jimmy Fund.
- In 1989, he helped create the Boston Marathon Jimmy Fund Walk, an event that has raised more than $5 million a year for the Jimmy Fund of Boston. Each year, nearly 10,000 walkers walk along the famous Boston Marathon course.

In 2004, McGillivray and nine other marathons runners ran relay-style across the U.S. following the same path he took in 1978, raising $350,000 for five charities benefiting children. They called the run TREK USA, which was an acronym for Trans-continental Embracing Kids.

In February 2018, he completed the World Marathon Challenge, which consists of seven marathons on seven continents in seven days.

Each year McGillivray runs his birthday age in miles, a tradition he started when he was 12 and realized that running was his passion.

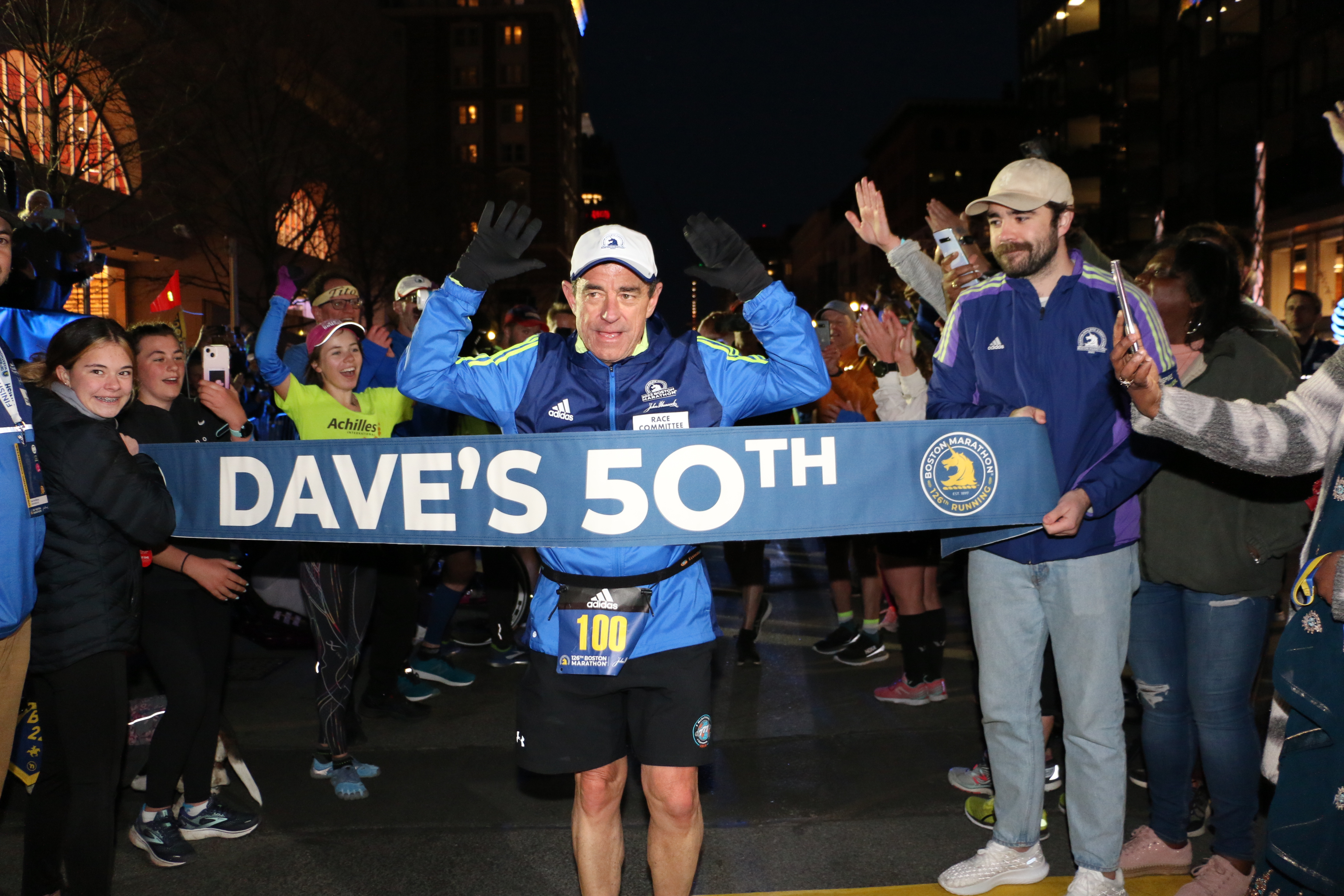
Dave McGillivray finishes his 50th consecutive Boston Marathon

McGillivray has also run the Boston Marathon each year since 1973—50 as of 2022: the first 15 years were as an entrant, and 35 during his time as the race director, running the course after his duties were completed.

As of January 2026, McGillivray has completed:

- 173 full marathons, including 53 consecutive Boston Marathons
- An 80-day trek across the United States, running the 3,452 miles from Medford, Ore., to Medford, Mass.
- the World Marathon Challenge, which consists of seven marathons in seven days on seven continents
- ten Ironman Triathlon World Championships
- a 1,250 mile run along the U.S. East Coast in 1980 to again benefit the Jimmy Fund,
- a 24-hour run (120 miles) a 24-hour bike (385 miles), and a 24-hour swim (27 miles)
- a triathlon around the six New England states by swimming one mile, biking 80 miles and running 20 miles every day for 32 consecutive days
- more than 150,000 running miles over the course of his life

== Professional life ==
McGillivray created DMSE Sports, Inc. in 1981, a firm that manages mass participatory road race events such as marathons, half-marathons, 10Ks, 5-milers, 5Ks, and charity walks. In 1982, when McGillivray was on the Governor's Council of Physical Fitness and Sports, he helped create the Bay State Games as a way to bring a statewide summer sports festival to Massachusetts.

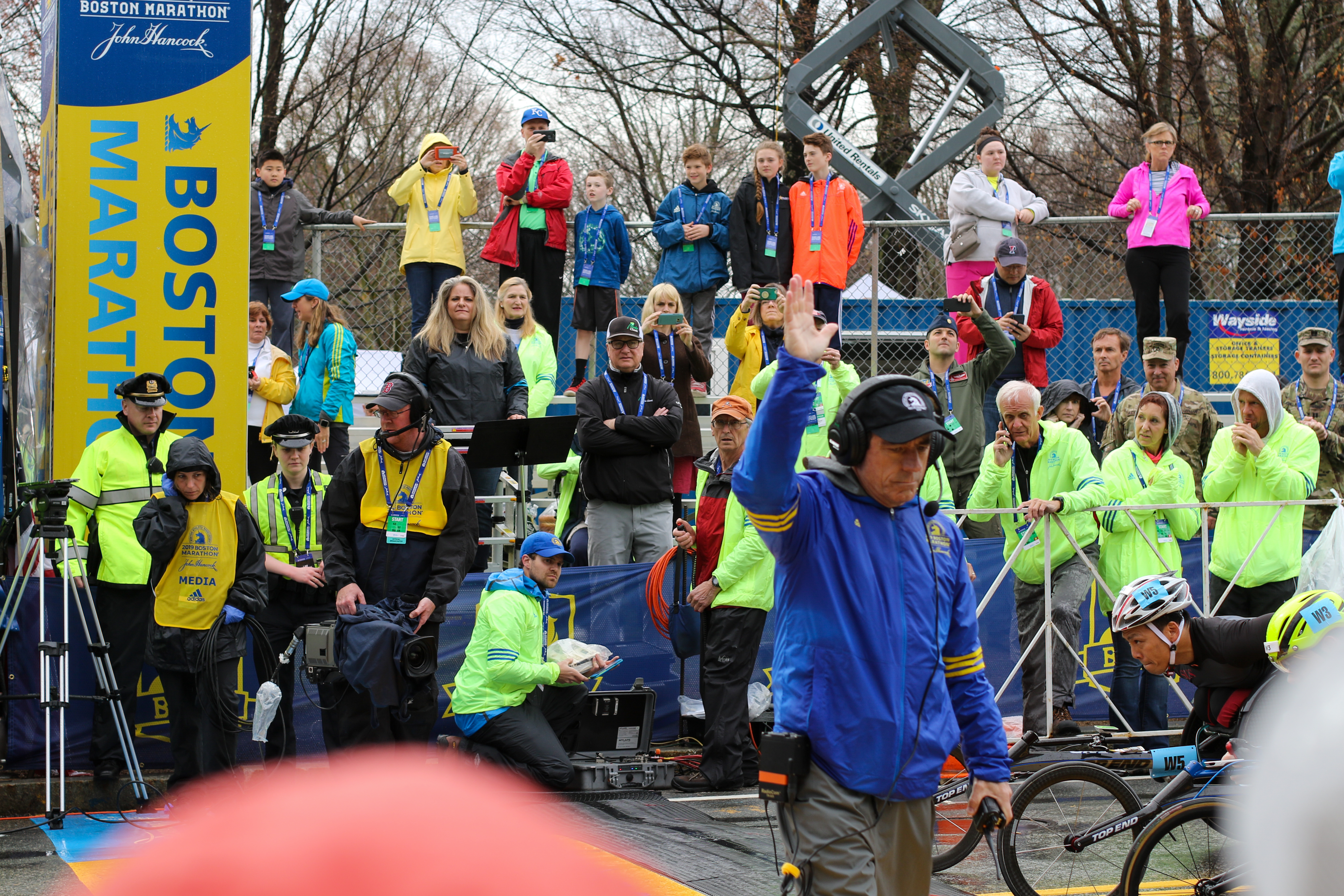
Dave McGillivray stands at the start line of the Boston Marathon

He has worked with the Boston Marathon since 1988, first as technical director, and then as race director beginning in 2001. In 1998, Olympic Gold Medalist Joan Benoit Samuelson tapped him to become the race director of the TD Beach to Beacon 10K Road Race in Cape Elizabeth, Maine.

Other races McGillivray and his team have managed include the Bellin 10K Run in Green Bay, Wisconsin; the B.A.A. Half Marathon/10K/5K; Across the Bay 10K; the Boston Marathon Jimmy Fund Walk; the Runner's World Festival & Half; the Mount Washington Road Race; the Feaster Five Thanksgiving Day Road Race; and the ASICS Falmouth Road Race. DMSE has also created several races, including the Fenway Park Marathon (a 113 lap course held entirely within the ballpark), Run to Home Base (Fenway Park; Boston), Harvard Pilgrim Finish at the Fifty (Gillette Stadium; Foxboro, Massachusetts).

In 2021, in the midst of the COVID-19 pandemic, McGillivray, along with his team at DMSE Sports, were tapped by CIC Health to oversee logistics for mass vaccination sites at Gillette Stadium, Fenway Park, Reggie Lewis Center, Hynes Convention Center.

To date, DMSE has helped manage more than 1,400 events throughout the world.

== Books ==
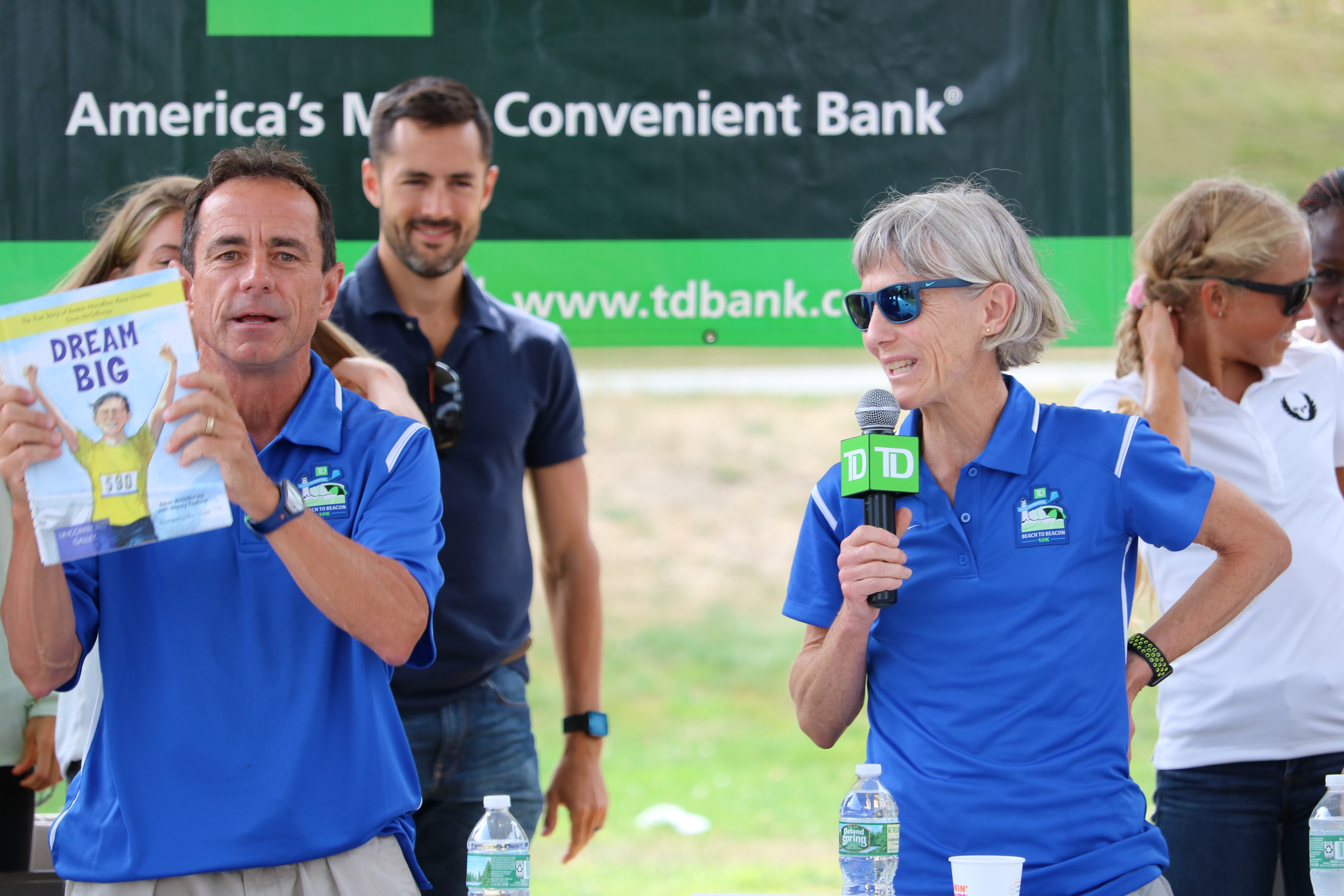
Dave McGillivray holds a copy of his illustrated children's book, Dream Big

In 2006, McGillivray wrote “The Last Pick” with writer Linda Glass Fechter, chronicling his childhood as the last pick for team sports because of his small stature, telling readers never to underestimate their own ability, and to set goals, not limits. The book also covers his life as an athlete and race director.

In 2018, he and his co-author, Nancy Feehrer, published the first of their illustrated children's books. "Dream Big: A True Story of Courage and Determination " is a nonfiction story about reaching deep and showing extreme determination in the face of doubt, disappointment, and loss. Their second children's book was published in 2019. "Running Across America" chronicles McGillivray's 1978 run across the contiguous United States. In 2021, they published their third illustrated book, "Finish Strong: Seven Marathons, Seven Continents, Seven Days," which tells the adventure of McGillivray's 2018 World Marathon Challenge adventure.

== Nonprofit leadership ==
In 2003, McGillivray created the DMSE Children's Fitness Foundation to support non-profit organizations that use running to promote physical fitness in children.

In 2022, the foundation was relaunched as the Dave McGillivray Finish Strong Foundation to "inspire and empower youth across New England and beyond to increase physical activity, expand literacy, and build community and self-esteem though running, reading, and performing acts of kindness."

== Motivational speaking ==
McGillivray has made 1400 appearances over 40 years as a motivational speaker. He has presented stories and insights from his life in nearly every major U.S. city and has traveled abroad to various countries including Canada, Denmark, England, France, Poland, Sweden, in addition to Bermuda, and the Caribbean.

In 2019, he presented a version of his "Defining Moments" speech in a Ted Talk.

== Awards ==
- 1972 Valedictorian — Medford High School (Massachusetts)
- 1976 Valedictorian — Merrimack College (Massachusetts)
- 2000 Lifetime Achievement Award — Competitor Magazine
- 2000 Director of the Year, Running Times Magazine — Road Race Management and Running Times Magazine
- 2005 Inducted into the Running USA Hall of Champions
- 2006 Christ the Servant Award — Lazarus House, for continuous dedication to the unloved and forgotten who are served by the Lazarus House Ministries
- 2007 Runner’s World Heroes of Running Award, honoring outstanding individuals from the running community whose achievements and contributions are nothing short of extraordinary
- 2007 Proclaimed Honorary Citizen — Town of Hopkinton, Massachusetts
- 2009 Jimmy Award — Jimmy Fund and Dana-Farber Cancer Institute
- 2010 Fleet Feet Lifetime Commitment to Running Award
- 2010 Ron Burton Community Service Award — Massachusetts Interscholastic Athletic Association
- 2011 Inducted into the USA Triathlon Hall of Fame
- 2011 "One Hundred" list honoring outstanding contributions in the fight against cancer – Massachusetts General Hospital
- 2012 Honorary Doctor of Public Service degree – Merrimack College (Massachusetts)
- 2013 Spirit of Giving Award – Ironstone Farms (Andover, Massachusetts)
- 2013 Dreamfar Breakfast of Champions Award – Dreamfar High School Marathon
- 2014 Honorary Doctor of Humane Letters degree – Newbury College (Massachusetts)
- 2014 Back on My Feet Endurance Spirit Award
- 2015 MarathonFoto/Road Race Management Lifetime Achievement Award
- 2015 Runner's World "The 50 Most Influential People in Running" list
- 2017 Road Runners Club of America Distance Running Hall of Fame Inductee
- 2017 Merrimack College Athletics Hall of Fame Inductee
- 2018 PIGGYs Award — Flying Pig Marathon; Cincinnati, Ohio
- 2019 Sports Museum Lifetime Achievement Award
- 2019 Performed on the inaugural TEDx Kenmore Square stage
- 2020 Medford, OR, declared February 13, 2020, “Dave McGillivray Day” in recognition of his 1978 run from Medford, OR, to Medford, MA.
- 2021 Old North Church Third Lantern Award recipient
- 2022 Completed his 50th Boston Marathon (35th run at night after his race director duties were complete) and fundraiser $100,000 for the Dave McGillivray Finish Strong Foundation.
- 2022 City of Medford names the track at Medford's Hormel Stadium in McGillivray's honor

== Sources ==
- Runner's World, by Amby Burfoot, "Heroes of Running: Dave McGillivray: The Leader" -

http://www.runnersworld.com/article/0,7120,s6-243-560--12372-0,00.html Link is down

- Running USA "Dave McGillivray named to USA Triathlon Hall of Fame" - http://www.runningusa.org/node/74758

Link is down

- By Jason Wolfe, DMSE Sports News, Wolfe News Wire - http://www.wolfenews.com/clients/DMSE-Sports/110/
- By Dave McGillivray with Linda Glass Fechter and foreword by Joan Benoit Samuelson, The Last Pick: The Boston Marathon Race Director's Road to Success, published by Rodale Inc., 2006 - https://www.amazon.com/Last-Pick-Marathon-Directors-Success/dp/1594864225, ISBN 1-59486-422-5
- Boston Globe, by David Abel, "Running Last, But Not Least", The Boston Globe" Running Last but not Least." http://articles.boston.com/2011-04-17/news/29428537_1_dave-mcgillivray-oldest-annual-marathon-boston-marathon
- Boston Globe, by Bella English, Running for His Life, 2004,
- Boston Herald, by Steve Buckley "A Reason to Run", http://www.bostonherald.com/sports/columnists/view.bg?articleid=1322698* Competitor Magazine "Boston Marathon Race Director Completes Birthday Run," http://running.competitor.com/2011/08/news/boston-marathon-race-director-completes-birthday-run_35244
- Runner's World "Ask the Race Director" http://racedirector.runnersworld.com/2012/01/why-cant-i-defer-my-entry.html*
