= California State Games =

Multi-sport event in California, United States

- Abbreviation: CSG
- Motto: To promote and nurture the health, education, and competitive spirit of residents of California by managing a quality amateur sports event that encourages participation and provides an Olympic experience.
- Purpose: Sports for working people
- Frequency: Yearly
- Executive Director: Sandi Hill
- Headquarters: San Diego, CA 92110
- Website: California State Games

The California State Games is an annual Olympic-style competition for California's amateur athletes of all ages and abilities. The Games is a member of the National Congress of State Games and of the United States Olympic Committee. Most of the events are held in locations throughout San Diego County (home of one of the USOC's three Olympic Training Center campuses) for both the Winter and Summer competitions. Skiing events held during the 2004 to 2007 Games took place at the June Mountain Ski Area in Mono County on the eastern slope of the Sierra Nevada.

== Summer Games ==
=== Sporting events ===
- Archery
- Badminton
- Baseball
- Basketball
- BMX
- Field Hockey
- Jr. Lifeguards
- Judo
- Pickleball
- Powerlifting
- Rugby
- Skateboarding
- Soccer
- Softball
- Surfing
- Swimming
- Synchronised swimming
- Table Tennis
- Track & Field (Youth)
- Track & Field (Adult)
- Water Polo
- Weightlifting
- Wrestling

== Winter Games ==
=== Sporting events ===
==== Current events ====
- Ice Hockey - Competition takes place in February
- Figure Skating - Competition takes place in March
- Gymnastics - Competition takes place in March
- Roller Skating - Competition takes place in March

==== Past Events ====
- Skiing
- Snowboarding
