= National Congress of State Games =

American nonprofit sports organization

- Sport: Multiple sports
- Category: Amateur
- Jurisdiction: United States
- Abbreviation: NCSG
- Founded: 1988
- Affiliation: United States Olympic Committee
- Location: Grand Rapids, Michigan, U.S.
- President: Eric Engelbarts
- Vice president: Kevin Cummings

Official website
- www.stategames.org

The National Congress of State Games (or American games) is an American nonprofit sports association, consisting of 27 full members divided into three regions. As of 2023, NCSG members run 26 Summer Games and a number of winter games The NCSG is part of the United States Olympic Committee and organizes the State Games of America, an Olympic-style multi-sport event in which athletes who have won a medal in their home state's Games are eligible to compete.

== Member States ==
As of 2026, there are 29 member states.

- Alabama Sports Festival (Alabama)
- Grand Canyon State Games (Arizona)
- California State Games (California)
- Rocky Mountain State Games (Colorado)
- Nutmeg State Games (Connecticut)
- Sunshine State Games (Florida)
- Georgia Games (Georgia)
- Iowa Games (Iowa)
- Sunflower State Games (Kansas)
- Bluegrass State Games (Kentucky)
- Louisiana State Games (Louisiana)
- Bay State Games (Massachusetts)
- State Games of Michigan (Michigan)
- State Games of Mississippi (Mississippi)
- Show-Me State Games (Missouri)
- Big Sky State Games (Montana)
- Cornhusker State Games (Nebraska)
- Garden State Games (New Jersey)
- New Mexico Games (New Mexico)
- Empire State Winter Games (New York)
- State Games of North Carolina (North Carolina)
- State Games of Oregon (Oregon)
- Keystone State Games (Pennsylvania)
- Games of Texas (Texas)
- Utah Summer Games, Utah Winter Games (Utah)
- Virginia Commonwealth Games (Virginia)
- State Games of West Virginia (West Virginia)
- Badger State Games (Wisconsin)
- Cowboy State Games (Wyoming)

=== Former ===
- Prairie Rose State Games (North Dakota) (ran from 1987 to 2011)

== See also ==
- Huntsman World Senior Games
- Senior Olympics (State Games)
