= Cosmo Park =

Park in Columbia, Missouri, US

Columbia Cosmopolitan Recreation Area
- Interactive map of Columbia Cosmopolitan Recreation Area
- Type: Public Park
- Location: Columbia, Missouri
- Coordinates: 38.973523°N 92.363048°W
- Area: 533 acres (2.16 km^{2})
- Operator: Columbia Parks and Recreation

Columbia Cosmopolitan Recreation Area, commonly referred to as Cosmo Park, is a city park in Columbia, Missouri. At 533 acres (2.16 km^{2}), it is the largest park in Columbia. It is also the location of the annual Show-Me State Games. Many soccer, football, lacrosse, softball, baseball, golf, mountain bike, and skateboard tournaments and events are hosted at Cosmo.

== History ==
The park is built on the location of the former Columbia Municipal Airport. The runways were rebuilt as parking lots, and the old layout of the airport can be seen in aerial imagery.

On September 17, 2007, the park was proposed as a possible location for Columbia's third high school. On October 10, 2007 City Council rejected this proposal.

== Activities ==
=== Facilities ===
L.A. Nickell Golf Course

The park features a par 70, 18-hole golf course that is open year-round (weather permitting). The course has no formal dress code; golf carts, a driving range, and lessons are all available.

Columbia Skate Park

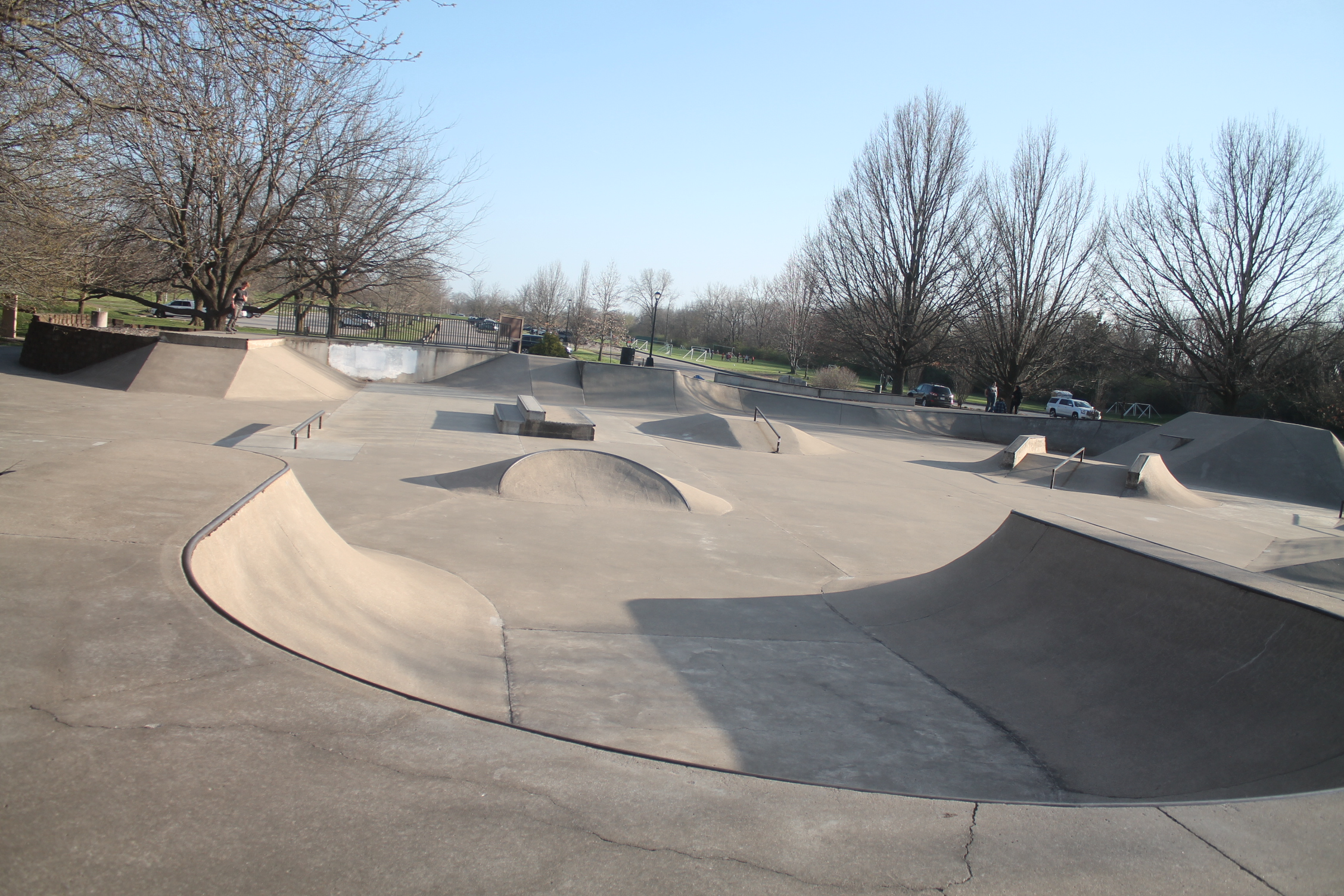
Cosmo Skate Park

The park contains a 28,000-square-foot (2,600 m^{2}) skate park that was opened in 1999. The skate park was built with the help of skateboarders and inline skaters.

Additional facilities

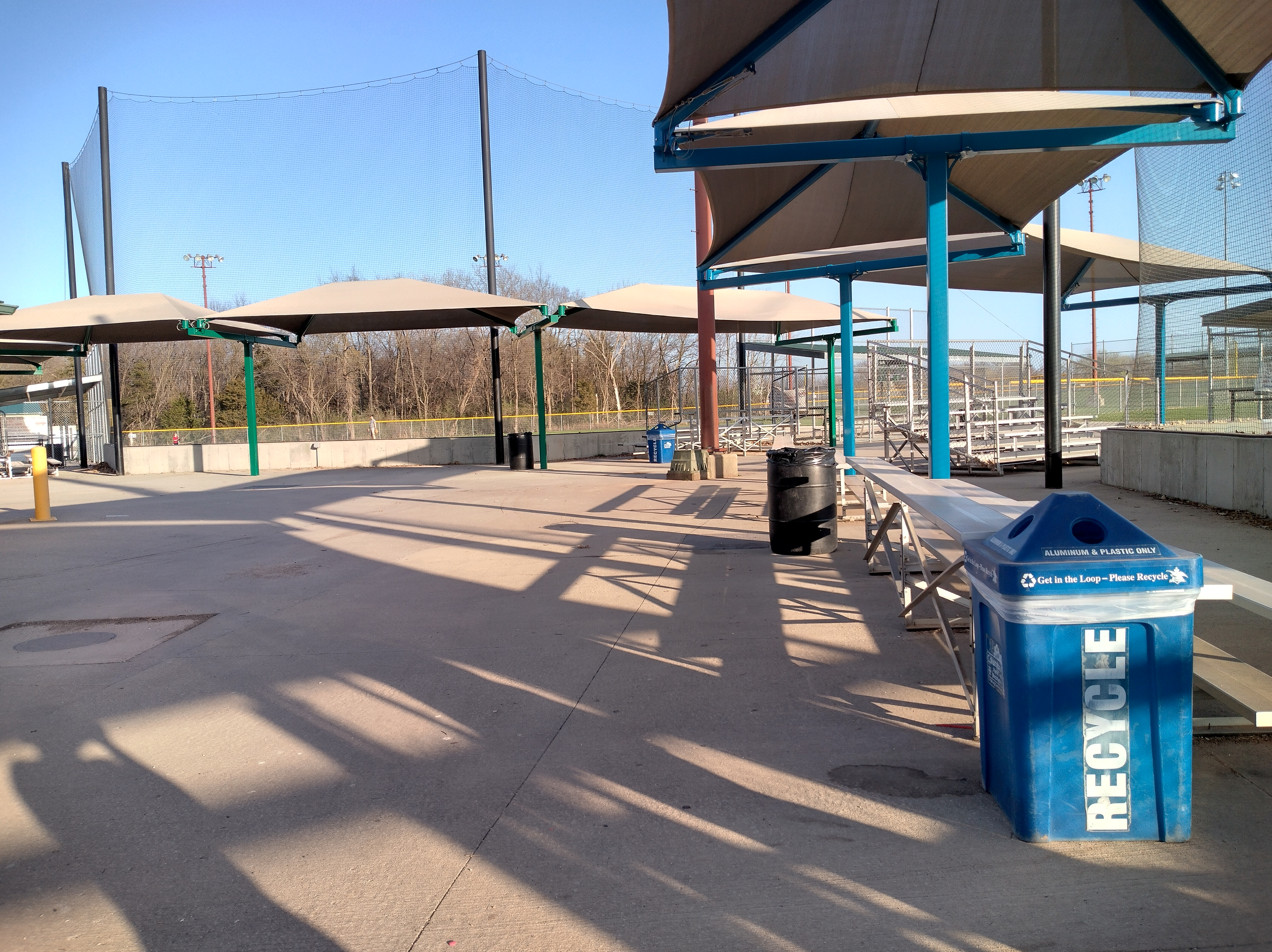
- View of interior of Antimi Sports Fields, Cosmo Park, Columbia, MO
  Antimi Sports Complex - eight baseball/softball/tee-ball fields.
- Football fields - six
- Horseshoe pits - twelve
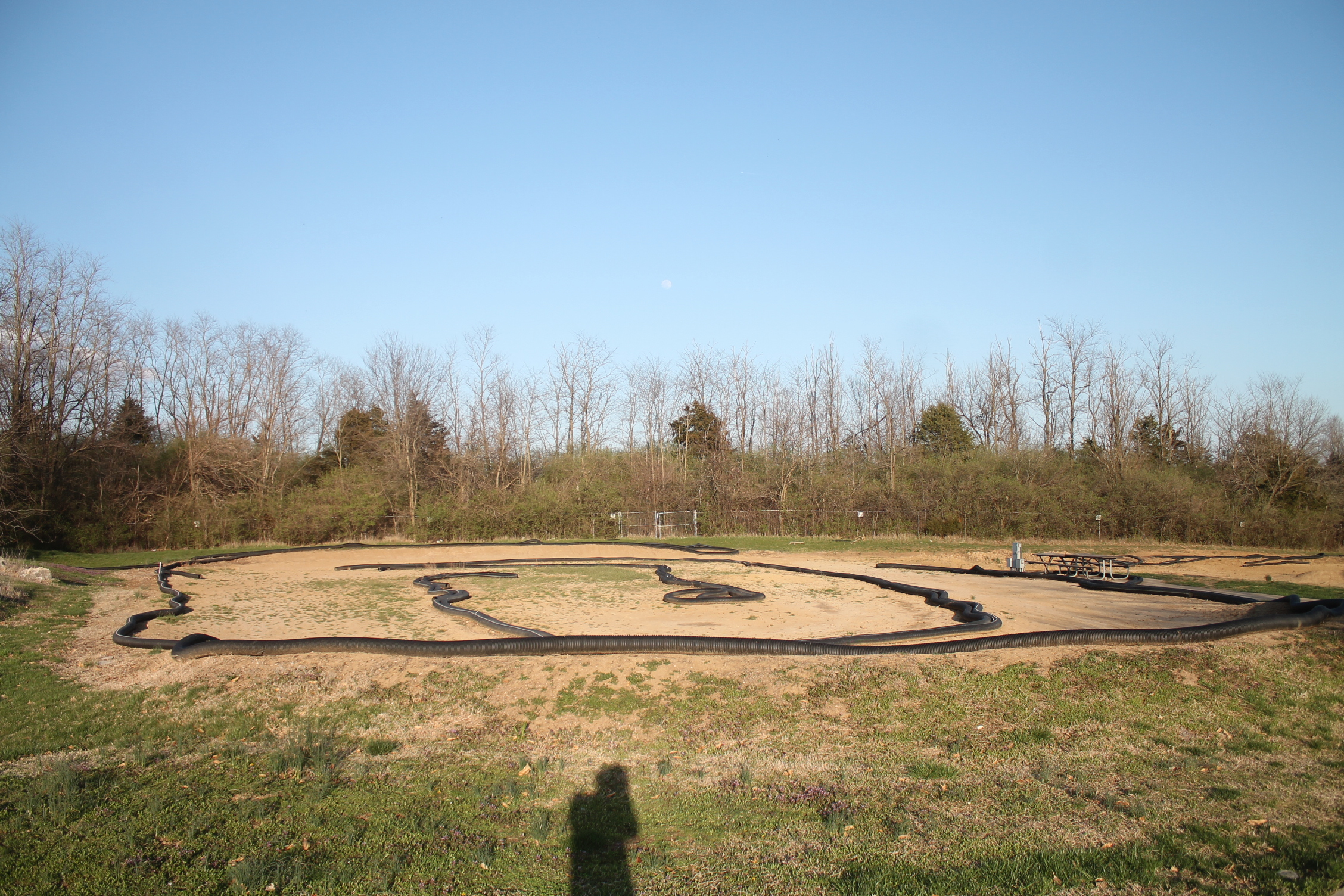
- Race Car Track, Cosmo Park, Columbia, MO on April 3, 2023
  Remote control car track
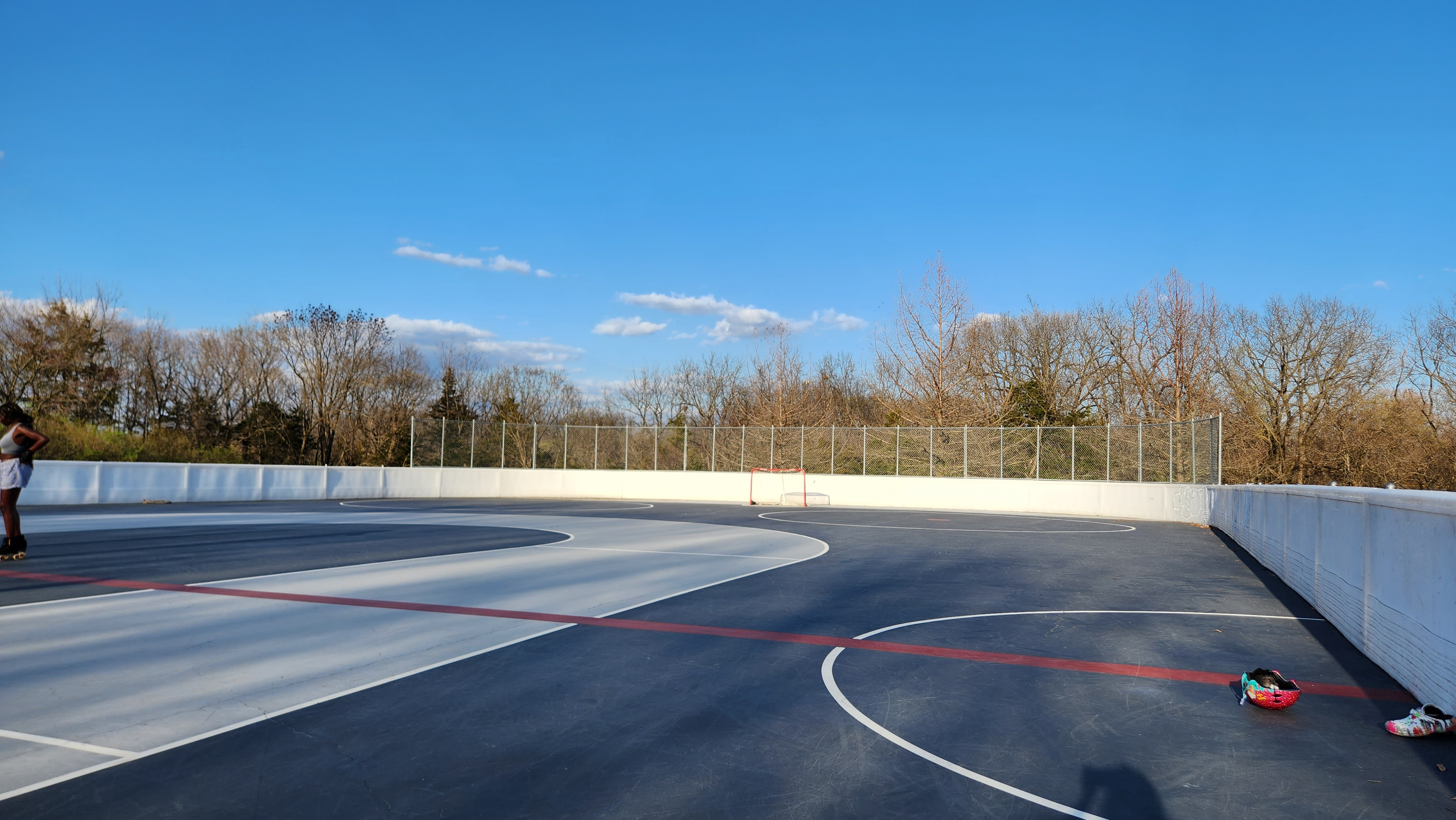
- Image of Roller Hockey Rink behind the Skate Park, Cosmo Park, Columbia, MO
  Roller hockey rink
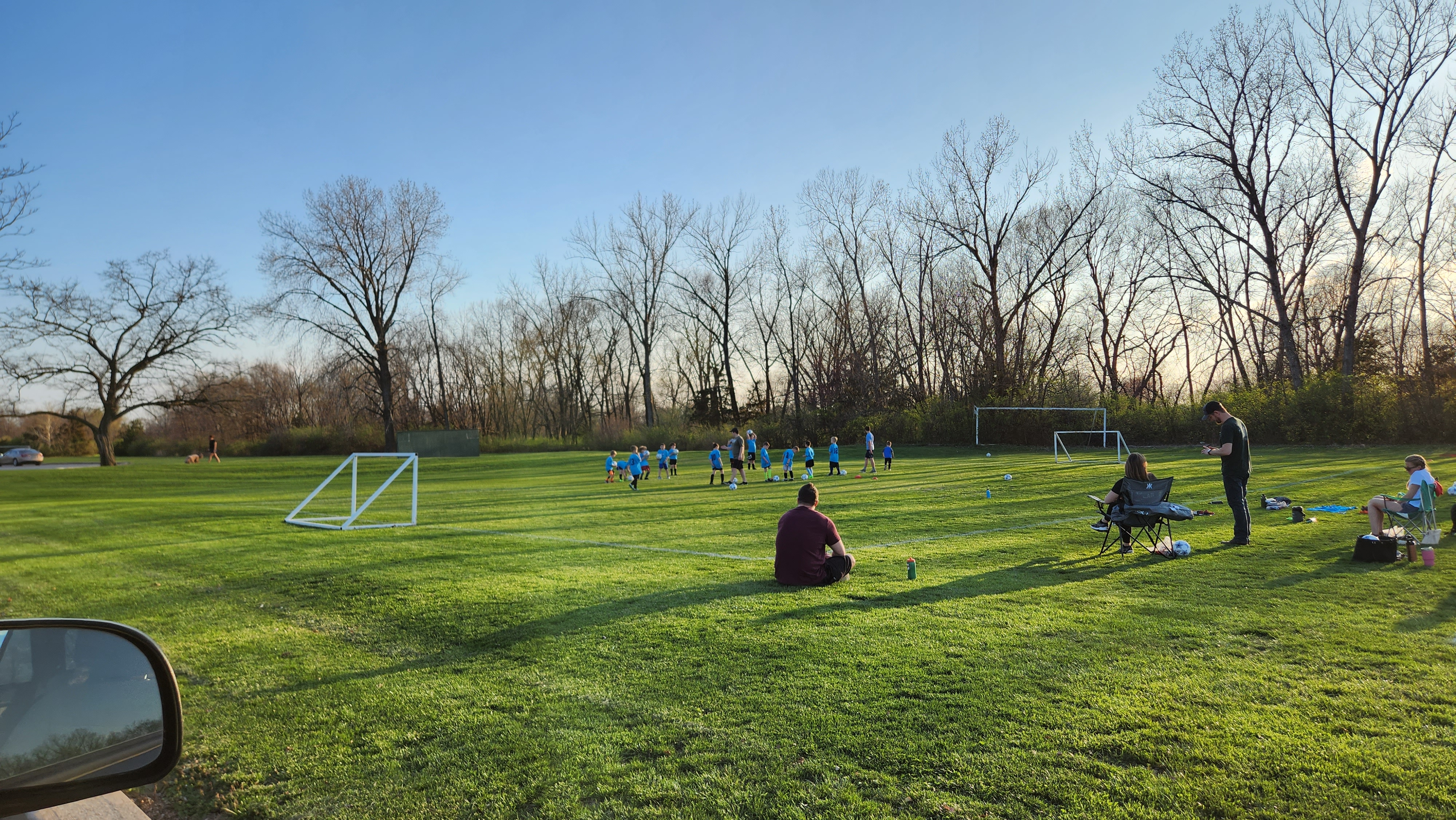
- Kids playing soccer on a soccer field at Cosmo Park, Columbia, MO
  Soccer fields - nineteen
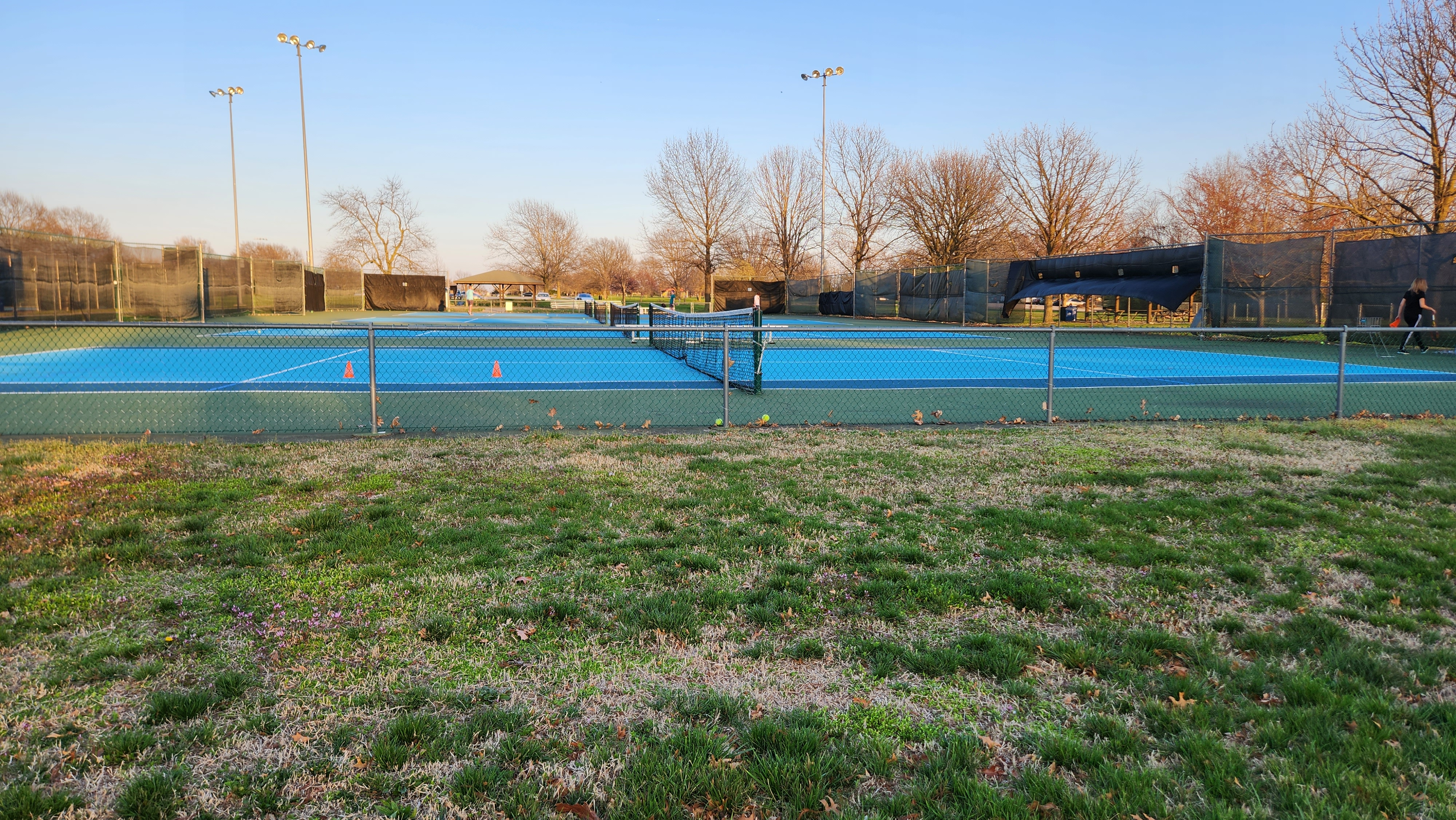
- Tennis Courts, Cosmo Park, Columbia, MO
  Tennis courts - eight
- Volleyball courts - six sand, one grass
- Playground

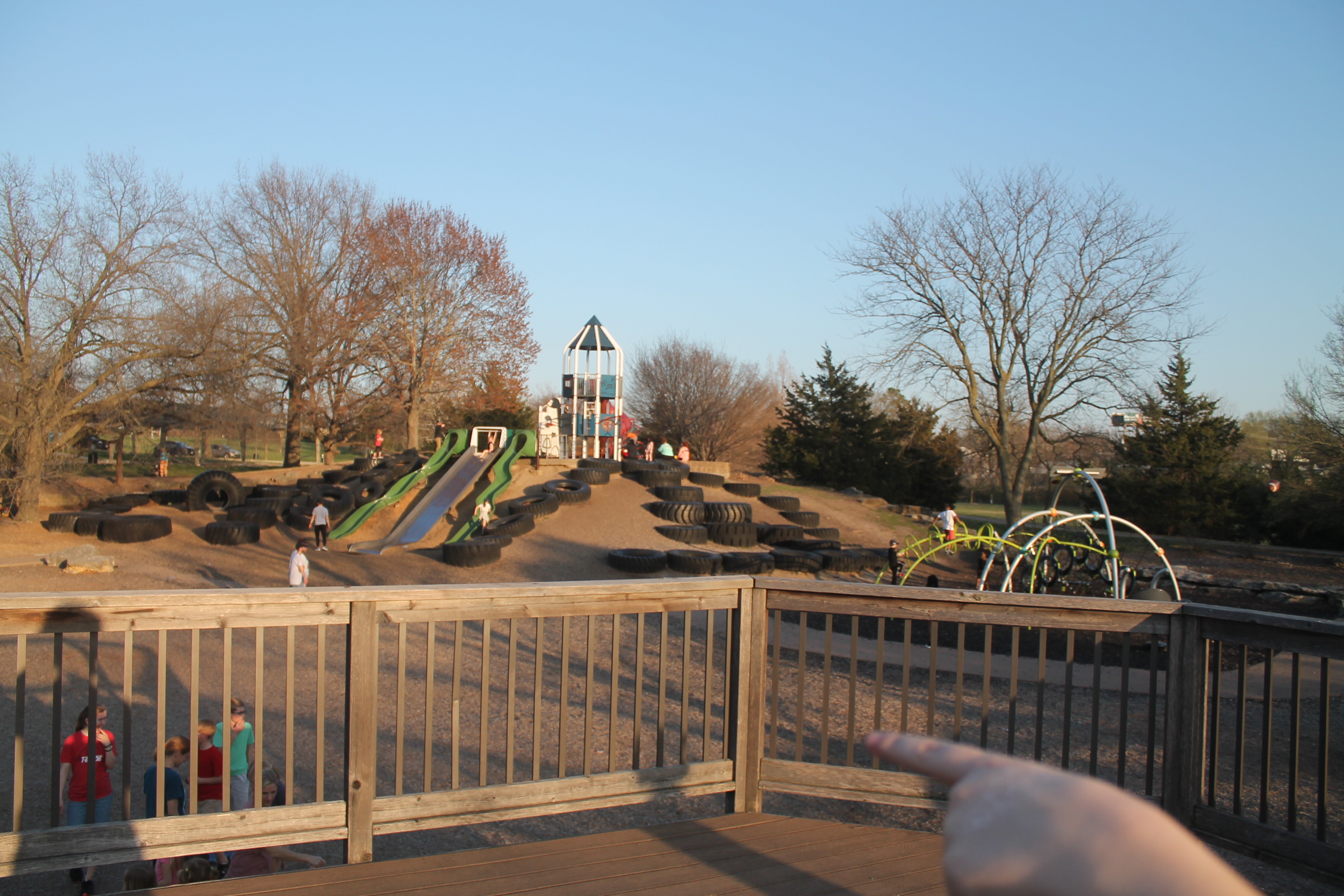
View of Cosmo Playground at sunset, Cosmo Park, Columbia, MO

== Trails ==
Several trails wind through the park:

- Cosmo Nature Trail - (1.75 miles, dirt). This trail wanders through a heavily wooded nature area and wetlands.
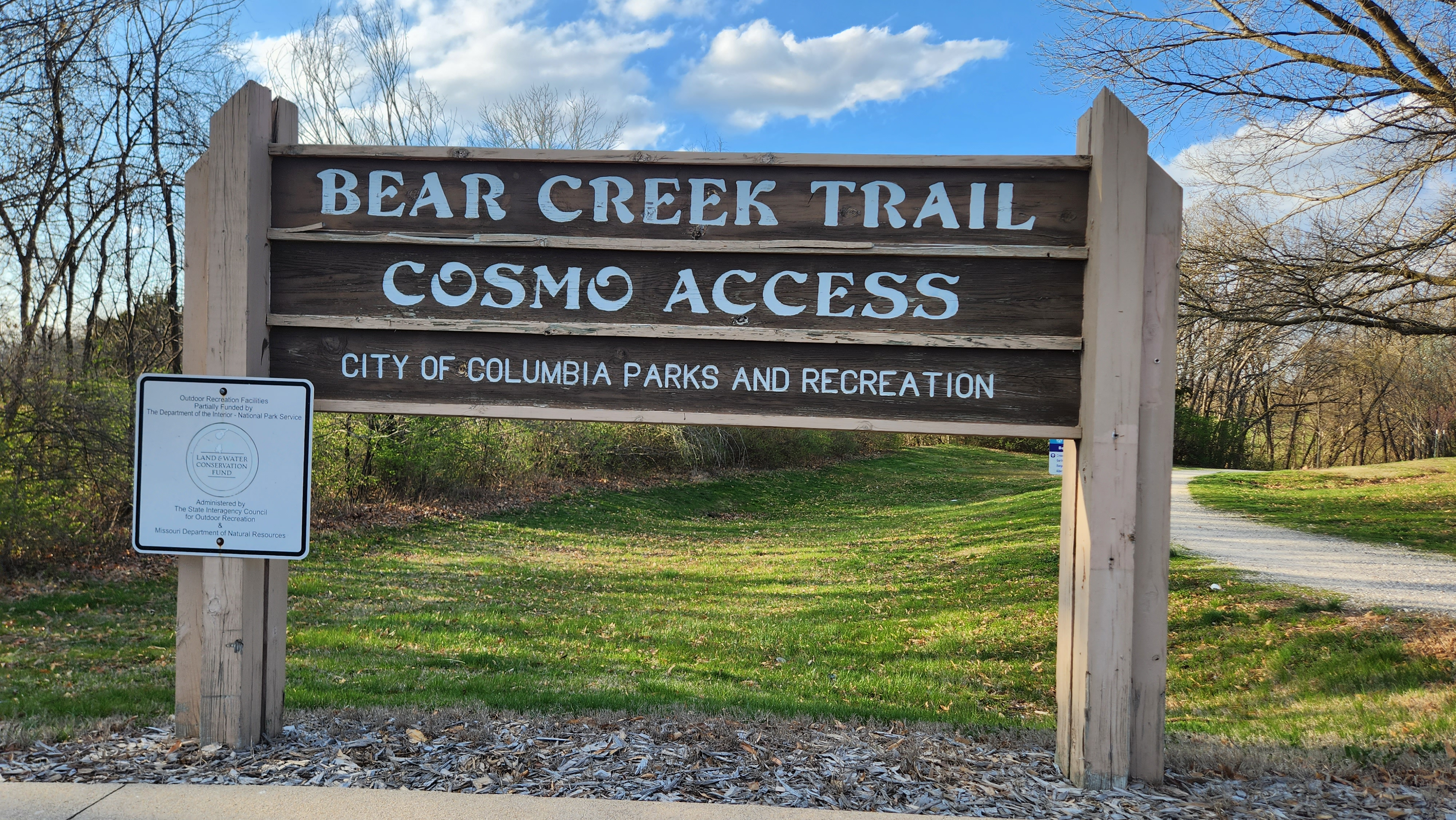
- Bear Creek Trail Access sign, Cosmo Park, Columbia, MO
  Bear Creek Trail - (4.8 miles, limestone gravel). This trail runs along Bear Creek and connects the park to the 75-acre (300,000 m^{2}) Albert Oakland Park.
- Cosmo Fitness Trail - (1.25 Miles, asphalt). A hard surface trail open to walkers, bikers, and skaters (no motorized vehicles).
- Rhett's Run Mountain Bike Trail - (2.4 miles, dirt). A mountain bike course.
