= Albert Oakland Park =

Park in Missouri, United States

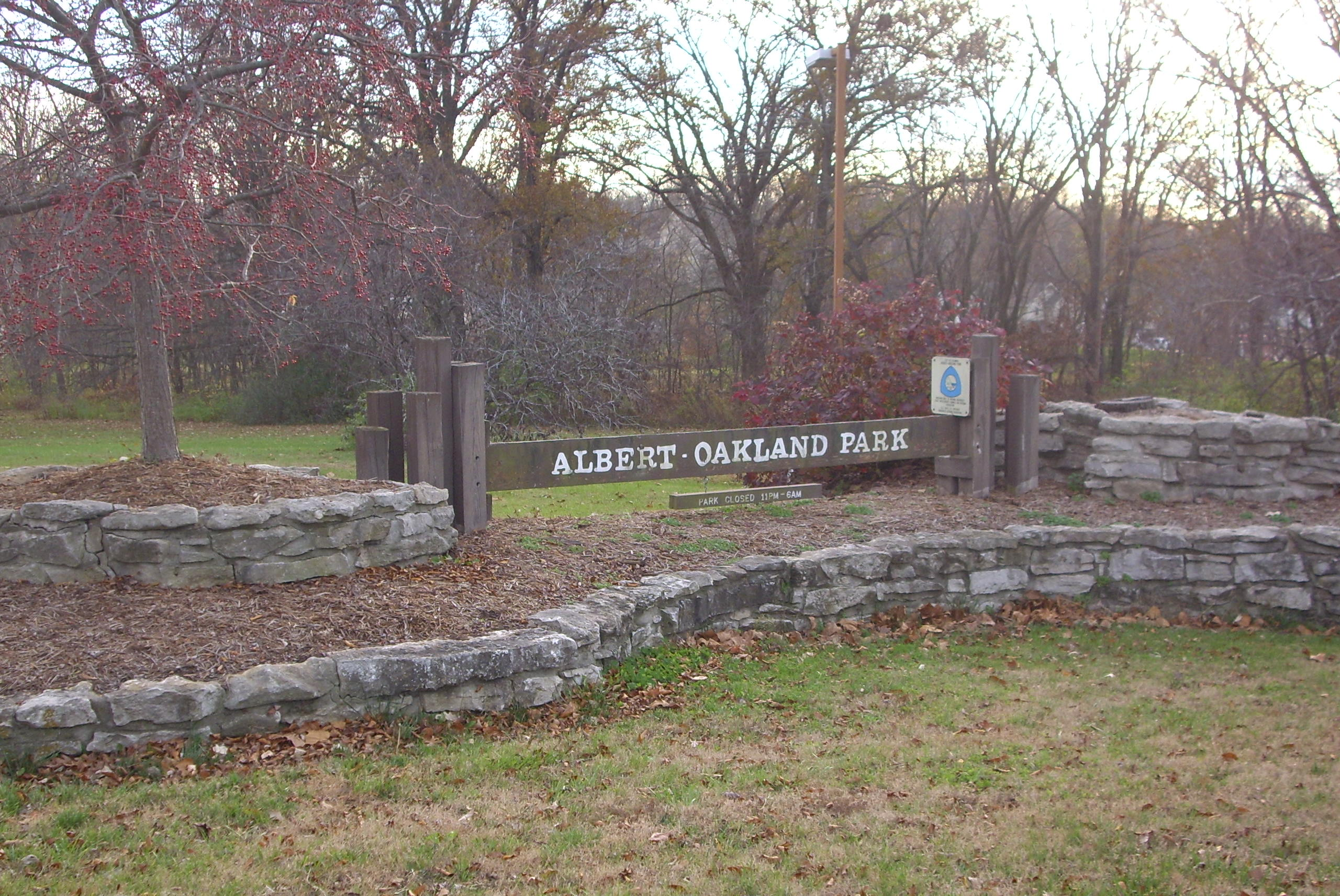
- Interactive map of Albert Oakland Park
- Location: Columbia, Missouri
- Coordinates: Maps 38°58′58″N 92°18′31″W
- Area: 81.5 acres (330,000 m^{2})
- Operator: Columbia Parks and Recreation

Albert Oakland Park is a 79-acre (320,000 m^{2}) park in Columbia, Missouri, in the United States. The park is located at 1900 Blue Ridge Road next to Oakland Middle School.

== History ==
The southern 20 acres (81,000 m^{2}) of the park was donated to the City of Columbia in 1964 and is known as the C.M. Albert Memorial Park.

== Activities ==
=== Facilities ===
- Albert-Oakland Family Aquatic Center
- Reservable Shelters - three total with drinking fountains, power outlets, BBQ grills, and restroom access.

=== Sports ===
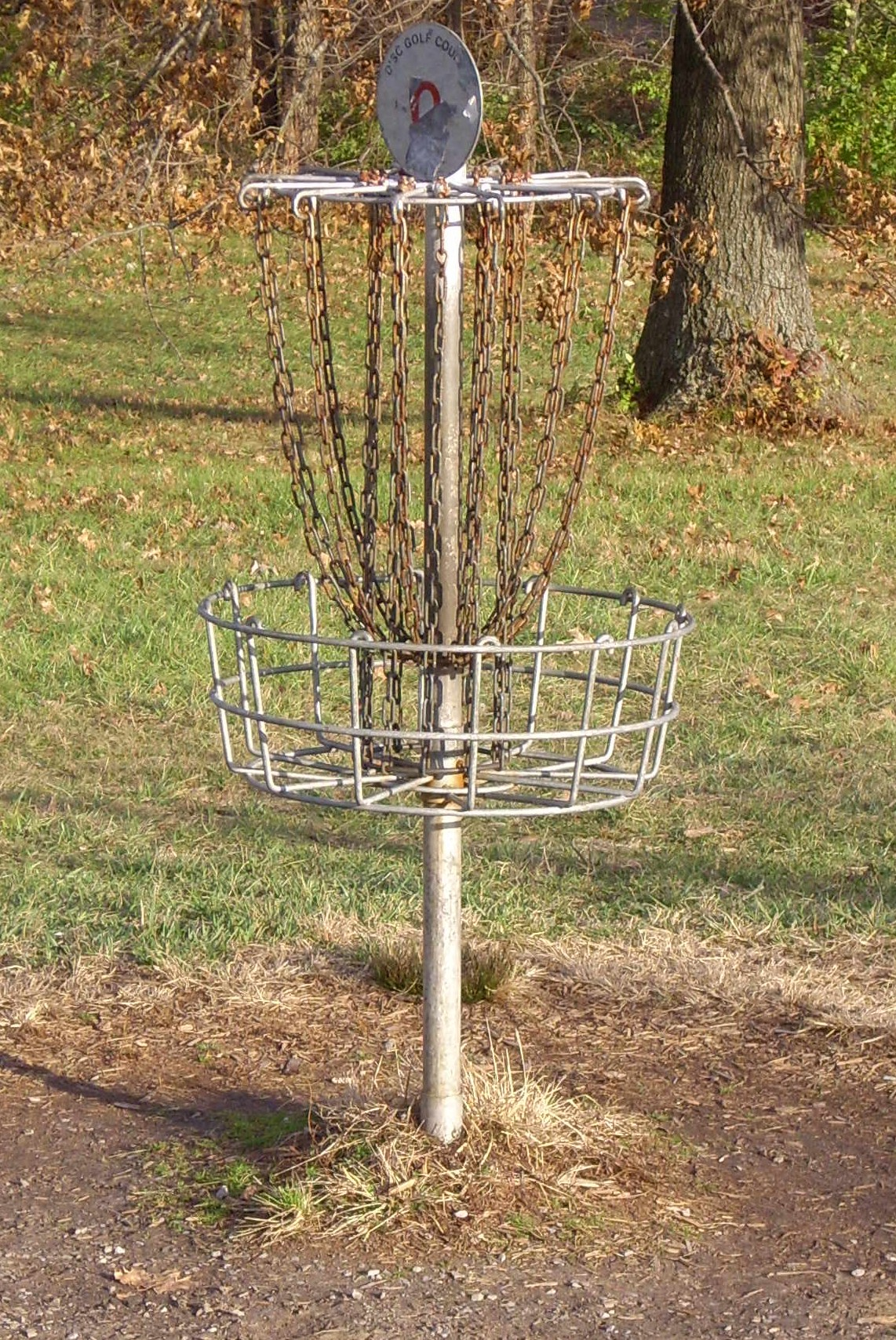
One of the park's Disc Golf Baskets

- Baseball/Softball fields - two
- Basketball court - one
- Disc Golf courses (18-hole) - two
- Playgrounds - two
- Soccer fields - two
- Tennis courts - one
- Sand Volleyball courts - two
- Pickleball courts - twelve
- Outdoor Pools
- Water Play Areas

=== Trails ===
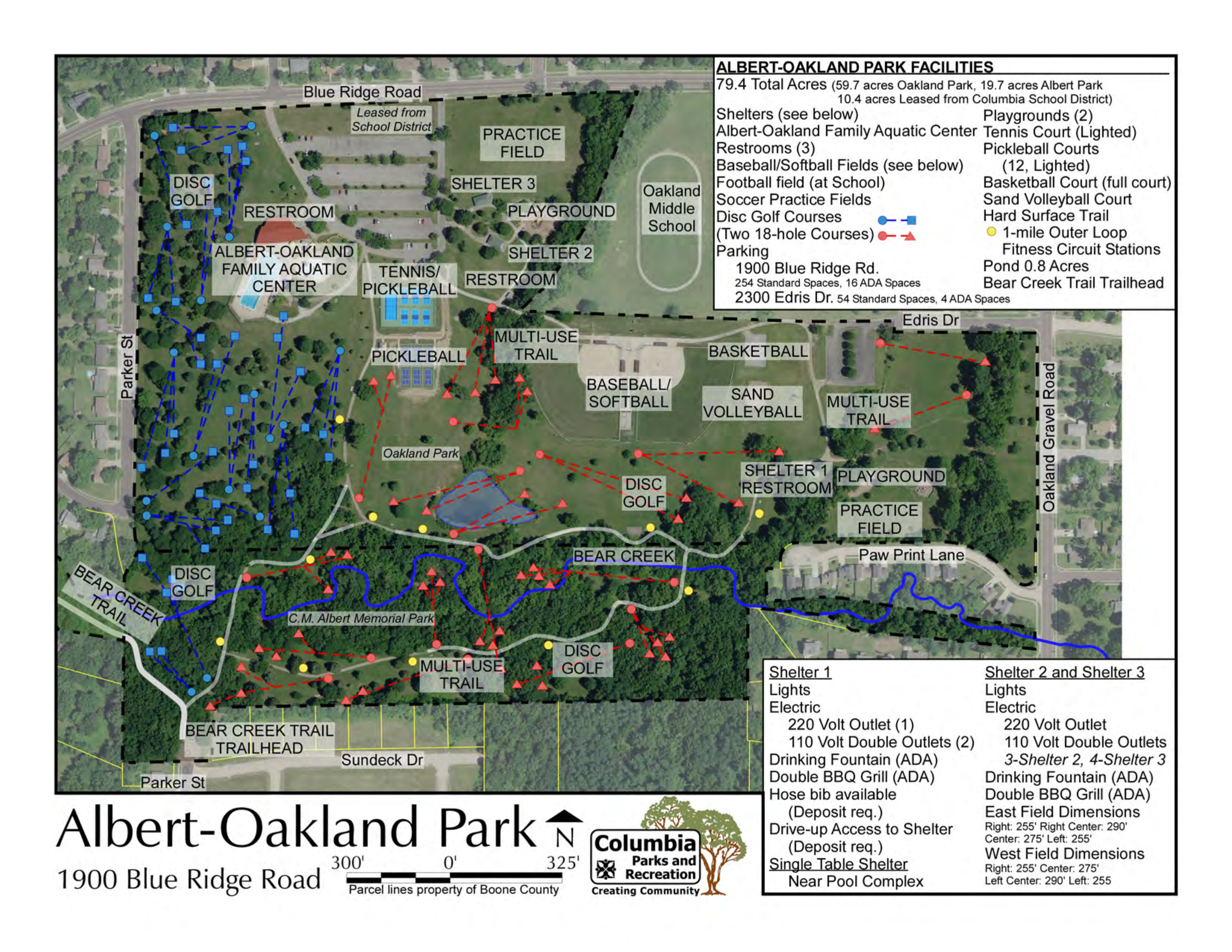
A Map of Albert-Oakland Park

Several trails wind through the park:

- Bear Creek Trail - (4.8 miles). This limestone gravel trail runs along Bear Creek and connects the park to the 533-acre (2,160,000 m^{2}) Columbia Cosmopolitan Recreation Area.
- Fitness Trail - (1 Mile). A hard surface trail with eighteen exercise stations.
