= Show-Me State Games =

Amateur athletic competition in Missouri, U.S.

The Show-Me State Games (SMSG) is an annual competition for amateur athletes in the U.S. state of Missouri, held in the city of Columbia, specifically the Columbia Cosmopolitan Recreation Area

The SMSG is a member of the National Congress of State Games and the United States Olympic Committee. SMSG is a program of the Missouri Governor's Council on Physical Fitness and Health, . The name derives from the state's official nickname, the "Show-Me State."

The Show-Me State Games has expanded from 600 participants in 1985, to more than 34,000 year-round participants in 2014. In addition to three weekends in the summer, the Show-Me STATE GAMES hosts events throughout the year, including basketball tournaments, soccer events, swimming events, triathlons, and a statewide Torch Run. The mission of the SMSG is to provide all Missourians the opportunity to "take part in an event of health, fitness, family and fun".
