= State Games of North Carolina =

Sporting event

- Abbreviation: SGNC
- Frequency: Annual
- Headquarters: Durham, North Carolina
- Website: https://www.ncsports.org/

The State Games of North Carolina (for sponsorship reasons known as the BODYARMOR State Games) is an Olympic-style competition in North Carolina, and a member of the National Congress of State Games. The BODYARMOR State Games are the largest sports festival in North Carolina and one of the largest State Games programs in the United States. The annual event features over 12,000 athletes and 600 teams competing in 25-30 different sports. The goal of the state games is to promote fitness, sportsmanship, and a drug-free environment to North Carolinians.

Many famous athletes have taken part in the games including Roy Lassiter, Julius Peppers, Rashad McCants, Chris Paul, Corey Seager, Bryse Wilson, Chris Archer, Carlos Rodon, Trot Nixon, Madison Bumgarner, Josh Howard, Brendan Haywood, Stephanie Watts, Wendy Palmer, Shea Ralph, Rodney Rodgers, and others.

The sports that are offered in the Games differ each year, but have included Archery, Badminton, Baseball, Basketball, Bowling, Boxing, Canoe/Kayak, Cheerleading, Cycling, Chess, Disc Golf, Diving, Esports, Equestrian, Fencing, Field Hockey, Figure Skating, Flag Football, Golf, Gymnastics, Horseshoes, Ice Hockey, In-Line Hockey, Judo, Jump Rope, Karate, Kickball, Lacrosse, Olympic Lifting, Ninja, Pickleball, Polo, Power Lifting, Rock Climbing, Roundnet, Rowing, 5K Road Race, Rugby, Sailing, Shooting, Skateboarding, Soccer, Softball, Strongman, Swimming, Table Tennis, Taekwondo, Tennis, Track & Field, Ultimate, Volleyball, Water Ski, Wrestling.

== Host cities ==
| Year | Host Cities | County Location |
|---|---|---|
| 1986 | The Triangle | Durham County, Orange County, Wake County |
| 1988 | The Triangle | Durham County, Orange County, Wake County |
| 1989 | The Triangle | Durham County, Orange County, Wake County |
| 1990 | The Triangle | Durham County, Orange County, Wake County |
| 1991 | The Triangle | Durham County, Orange County, Wake County |
| 1992 | The Triangle | Durham County, Orange County, Wake County |
| 1993 | Durham | Durham County |
| 1994 | Durham | Durham County |
| 1995 | Raleigh | Wake County |
| 1996 | Raleigh | Wake County |
| 1997 | Greensboro | Guilford County |
| 1998 | Greensboro | Guilford County |
| 1999 | Greensboro | Guilford County |
| 2000 | Raleigh | Wake County |
| 2001 | Raleigh | Wake County |
| 2002 | Raleigh | Wake County |
| 2003 | Winston-Salem | Forsyth County |
| 2004 | Winston-Salem | Forsyth County |
| 2005 | Cary | Wake County |
| 2006 | Cary | Wake County |
| 2007 | Greensboro | Guilford County |
| 2008 | Greensboro | Guilford County |
| 2009 | Charlotte | Mecklenburg County |
| 2010 | Charlotte | Mecklenburg County |
| 2011 | Winston-Salem | Forsyth County |
| 2012 | Winston-Salem | Forsyth County |
| 2013 | Charlotte | Mecklenburg County |
| 2014 | Charlotte | Mecklenburg County |
| 2015 | The Triangle | Durham County, Orange County, Wake County |
| 2016 | The Triangle | Durham County, Orange County, Wake County |
| 2017 | Piedmont Triad | Forsyth County, Guilford County, Alamance County |
| 2018 | Piedmont Triad | Forsyth County, Guilford County, Alamance County |
| 2019 | Charlotte | Mecklenburg County |
| 2020 | Charlotte | Mecklenburg County |
| 2021 | The Triangle | Durham County, Orange County, Wake County |
| 2022 | The Triangle | Durham County, Orange County, Wake County |
| 2023 | Charlotte | Mecklenburg County |
| 2024 | Charlotte | Mecklenburg County |
