= Senior Olympics =

Sports competition

Senior Olympics (NSGA)
- Organisers: National Senior Games Association
- Start date: July 24
- End date: August 4
- Host city: Des Moines (2025)
- Level: National
- Type: Masters athletics

The National Senior Games (Senior Olympics) are a sports competition mostly for senior citizens in the United States. It is conducted by the National Senior Games Association (NSGA) once every two years. Akin to the Summer Olympics, it is a multi-sport event devoted to adults above the age of 50 with several age brackets (50+, 55+, 60+, 65+, and 75+ for most sports). It consists of regional competitions held yearly in all states of the US.

== History ==
The games were founded by Warren Blaney. In 1969, the Los Angeles Memorial Coliseum Commission approved the 1970 meet. In June 1970 the first Senior Olympics took place at the Los Angeles Coliseum (1970 known as Senior Sports International Meet). The games continued in the 1970s and 1980s in the Los Angeles and Orange County, California. Today the meet is known as the Senior Games (or Senior Olympics). The Senior Games are now held in every state in the USA. In 1985 National Senior Olympics Organization (NSOO) was formed, and in 1990 NSGA took over control of the Senior Games.

A 1987 version attracted 2,500 people. Recent attendance (Louisville, 2007) had over 10,000 competitors and 20,000 spectators, with oldest competitors being over 100 years old.

In 2021 there are currently five regions under NSGA: Great Lakes, Northeast, Pacific, Southeast, and West. These national games are supported by the National Senior Games Association.

The Huntsman World Senior Games is an international senior sports competition begun in 1987. The 27 athletic events held in Southern Utah begin with the torch lighting in traditional Olympic fashion during the Opening Ceremonies.

== Summary ==
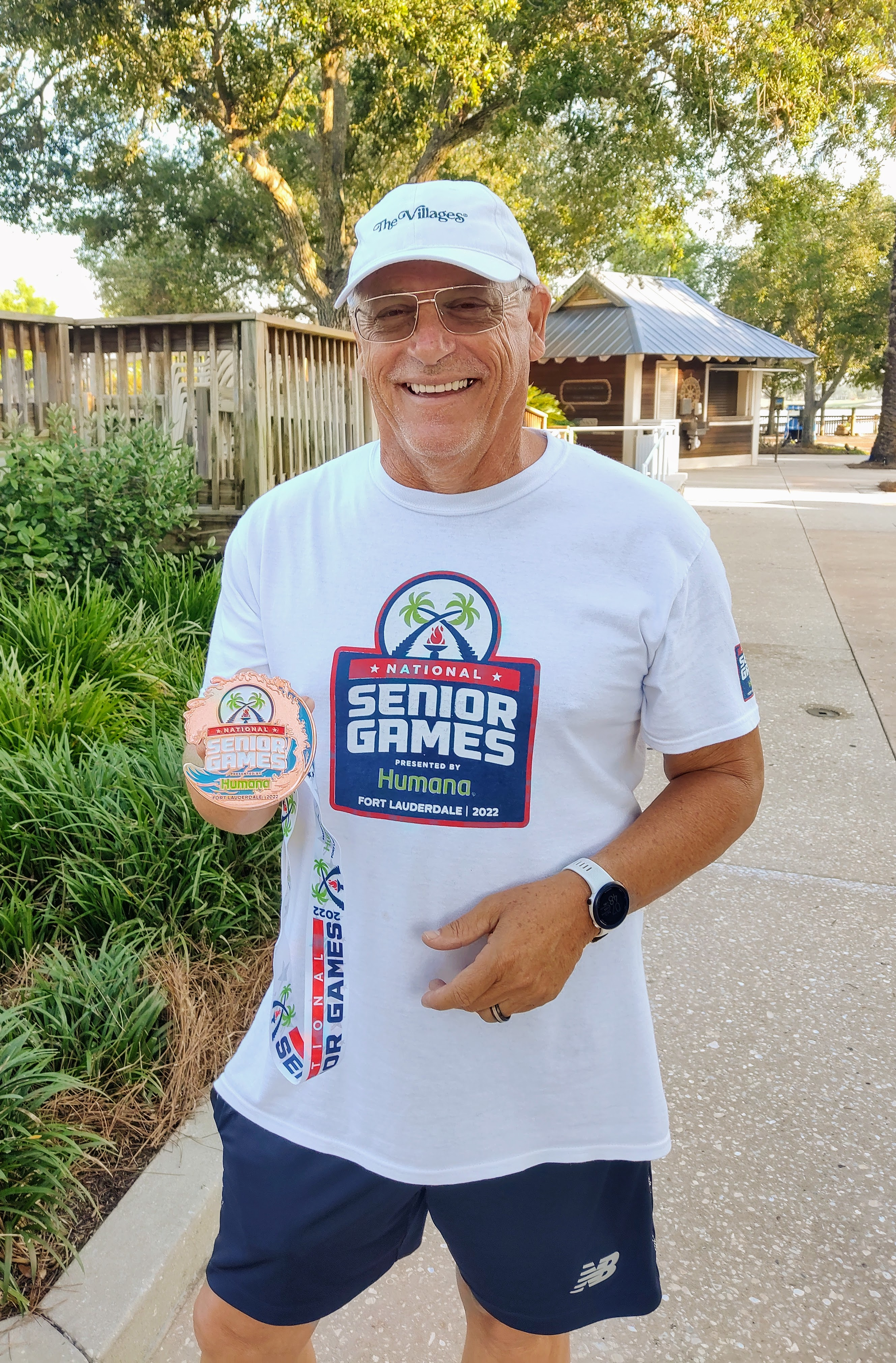
Man with a bronze medal in swimming from the 2022 Senior Games.

=== Summer ===
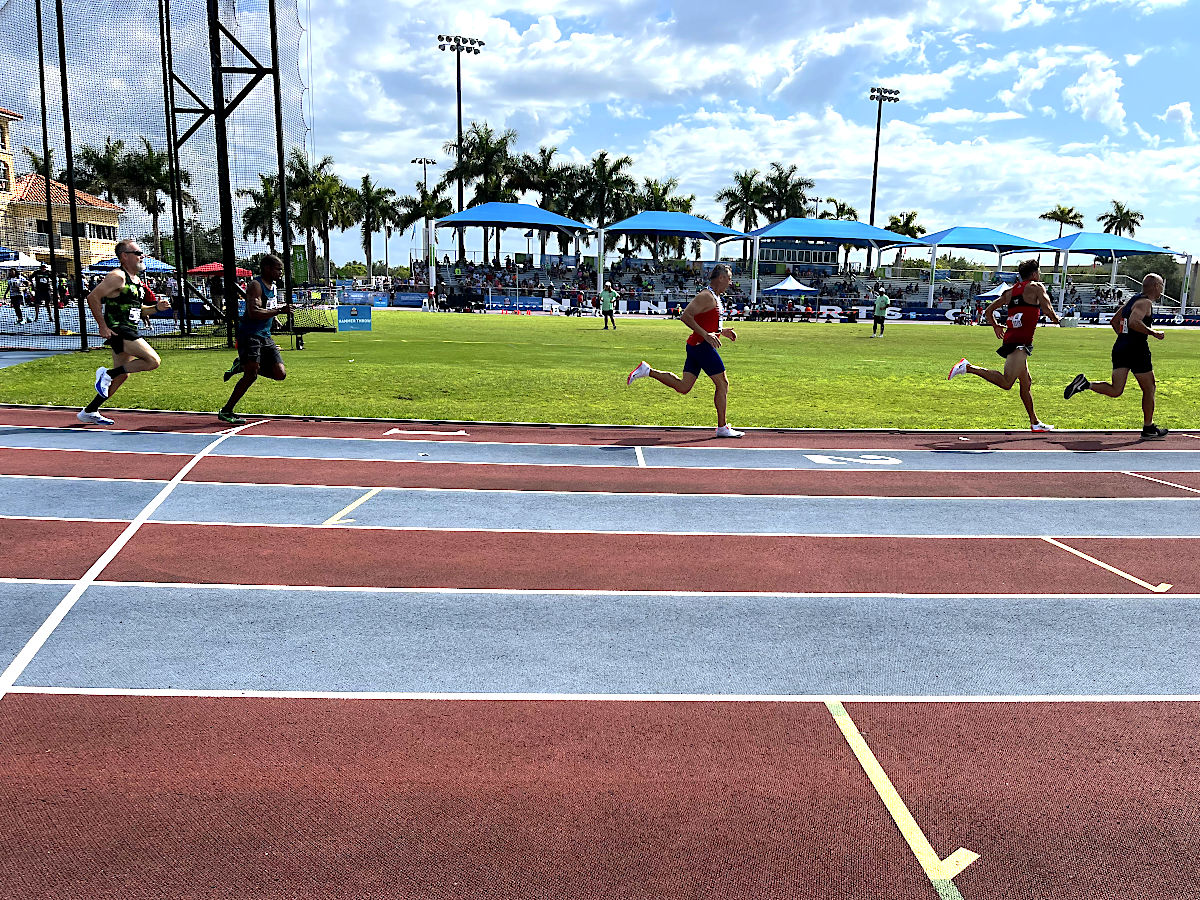
M50 800 meters at 2022 games

The Senior Summer Olympics are conducted from 1970 to the present day.

| Number | Year | Host city | Number of Sports | Number of Athletes |
|---|---|---|---|---|
| 1 | 1987 | St. Louis | 15 | 2,500 |
| 2 | 1989 | St. Louis | 16 | 3,400 |
| 3 | 1991 | Syracuse | 18 | 3,400 |
| 4 | 1993 | Baton Rouge | 18 | 7,200 |
| 5 | 1995 | San Antonio | 18 | 8,200 |
| 6 | 1997 | Tucson | 10 | 10,300 |
| 7 | 1999 | Orlando | 12 | 12,000 |
| 8 | 2001 | Baton Rouge | 18 | 8,700 |
| 9 | 2003 | Hampton Roads | 18 | 10,700 |
| 10 | 2005 | Pittsburgh | 18 | 11,100 |
| 11 | 2007 | Louisville | 18 | 12,000 |
| 12 | 2009 | Palo Alto | 18 | 10,000 |
| 13 | 2011 | Houston | 18 | 10,100 |
| 14 | 2013 | Cleveland | 19 | 10,881 |
| 15 | 2015 | Bloomington-Minneapolis-St.Paul | 19 | 9,989 |
| 16 | 2017 | Birmingham | 19 | 10,530 |
| 17 | 2019 | Albuquerque | 20 | 13,882 |
| 18 | 2021 (postponed to 2022) | Fort Lauderdale | 21 | 11,938 |
| 19 | 2023 | Pittsburgh | 21 | 11,681 |
| 20 | 2025 | Des Moines | TBD | TBD |

=== Winter ===
The Senior Winter Olympics were held from 2000 to 2011.

| Number | Year | Host city | Number of Athletes |
|---|---|---|---|
| 1 | 2000 | Lake Placid | 265 |
| 2 | 2002 | Lake Placid | 240 |
| 3 | 2003 | Buffalo | 640 |
| 4 | 2004 | Blaine | 560 |
| 5 | 2005 | Blaine | 440 |
| 6 | 2006 | Blaine | 500 |
| 7 | 2007 | Blaine | 420 |
| 8 | 2008 | Providence | 500 |
| 9 | 2009 | Fort Lauderdale | 410 |
| 10 | 2010 | Rochester | 260 |
| 11 | 2011 | Rochester | 250 |

== State Games Regions ==
NSGA State Regions:

1. Northeast (12): Connecticut, Delaware, Maine, Maryland, Massachusetts, New Hampshire, New Jersey, New York, Pennsylvania, Rhode Island, Vermont, Washington, D.C.
2. Southeast (12): Alabama, Arkansas, Florida, Georgia, Louisiana, Mississippi, Kentucky, North Carolina, South Carolina, Tennessee, Virginia, West Virginia
3. Great Lakes (8): Illinois, Indiana, Iowa, Michigan, Minnesota, Missouri, Ohio, Wisconsin
4. West (9): Colorado, Kansas, Nebraska, New Mexico, North Dakota, Oklahoma, South Dakota, Texas, Wyoming
5. Pacific (10): Alaska, Arizona, California, Hawaii, Idaho, Montana, Nevada, Oregon, Utah, Washington

== Senior State Games ==
Empire State Senior Games

USOC Festivals

The USOC Sports Festivals were in the 80s. Teams of North, East, South and West competed in a domestic Olympics.

Many states have held and still hold Sports Festivals.

- Keystone State Games in Pennsylvania
- Empire State Games in New York
- Prairie State Games in Illinois

Master and Senior Games

NSGA Qualifying Games

Veterans Games

Canada Games

== Sports ==
Individual Sports Competitions in the Senior Games:

- Archery
- Badminton
- Basketball Shooting-Skills
- Billiards 8-Ball
- Bowling
- Cornhole
- Cycling
- Disc Golf
- Golf
- Pickleball
- Powerwalk
- Powerlifting
- Race Walk
- Racquetball
- Road Race
- Shuffleboard
- Swimming
- Table Tennis
- Tennis
- Track & Field
- Triathlon

Team Sports Competitions:

- Basketball
- Badminton
- Beach Volleyball
- Soccer
- Softball
- Tennis
- Volleyball

Non-Ambulatory Sports Competitions:

- Non-Ambulatory Bowling
- Non-Ambulatory Cornhole
- Non-Ambulatory Pickleball
- Ambulatory Shuffleboard

== See also ==
- Huntsman World Senior Games
- Senior sport
- Masters athletics (track and field)
