= Cornhusker State Games =

State games of Nebraska, US

The Cornhusker States Games is the state games of Nebraska. It is part of an organization of games from within the National Congress of State Games. The games were established in 1985.

== Sports ==
- Adventure racing
- Aquatics (diving, open water swimming, swimming)
- Archery
- Arm wrestling
- Badminton
- Baseball
- Basketball
- BMX
- Bowling
- Chess
- Cornhole
- Craft axe throwing
- Curling
- Cycling
- Disc golf
- Electronic darts
- Esports
- Fencing
- Figure skating
- Fishing
- Foosball
- Footgolf
- Golf
- Gymnastics
- Hockey
- Horseshoes
- Jiu-jitsu
- Judo
- Karate
- Kart racing
- Miniature golf
- Nebraska State Fair (USA Powerlifting, Street Vault)
- Ninja Warrior Challenge
- Pickleball
- Pocket billiards
- Powerlifting
- Racquetball
- Road race
- Rowing
- Rugby
- Sailing
- Shooting sports
- Soccer
- Softball
- Super Retriever Series
- Table tennis
- Taekwondo
- Tennis
- Track and field
- Triathlon
- Volleyball
- Walking
- Wrestling
