= Sunshine State Games =

Annual olympiad in Florida, United States

The Sunshine State Games is an Olympics-style amateur sports competition for residents of Florida, United States. The event is part of the National Congress of State Games. The games began in 1980 and are held throughout the year.

== Sports ==
- Archery
- Badminton
- Basketball
- Canoe/Kayak
- Fencing
- Figure skating
- Inline hockey
- Judo
- Jump rope
- Karate
- Lacrosse
- Powerlifting
- Racquetball
- Road race
- Rugby
- Softball
- Swimming
- Tennis
- Track and field
- Volleyball
- Water polo
- Wrestling
