= Alabama Sports Festival =

Multi-sport event in Alabama, United States

The Alabama Sports Festival was founded in 1982 at the request of the United States Olympic Committee and is a member of the National Congress of State Games. The Summer Games, an effort of the Alabama Sports Festival, Inc., is a 501(c)3 non-profit organization, providing opportunities to compete in Olympic-style games.

== Sports ==
In 2010, competition was held in the following sports:

- Archery/Bow-hunting
- Baseball
- Basketball
- Bowling
- Cycling
- Disc golf
- Diving
- Flag football
- Football 7 on 7
- Gymnastics
- Lacrosse
- Shooting Sports
- Soccer
- Softball
- Swimming
- Taekwondo
- Track and field
- Triathlon
- Volleyball
