= Rothschild Pavilion =

- U.S. National Register of Historic Places
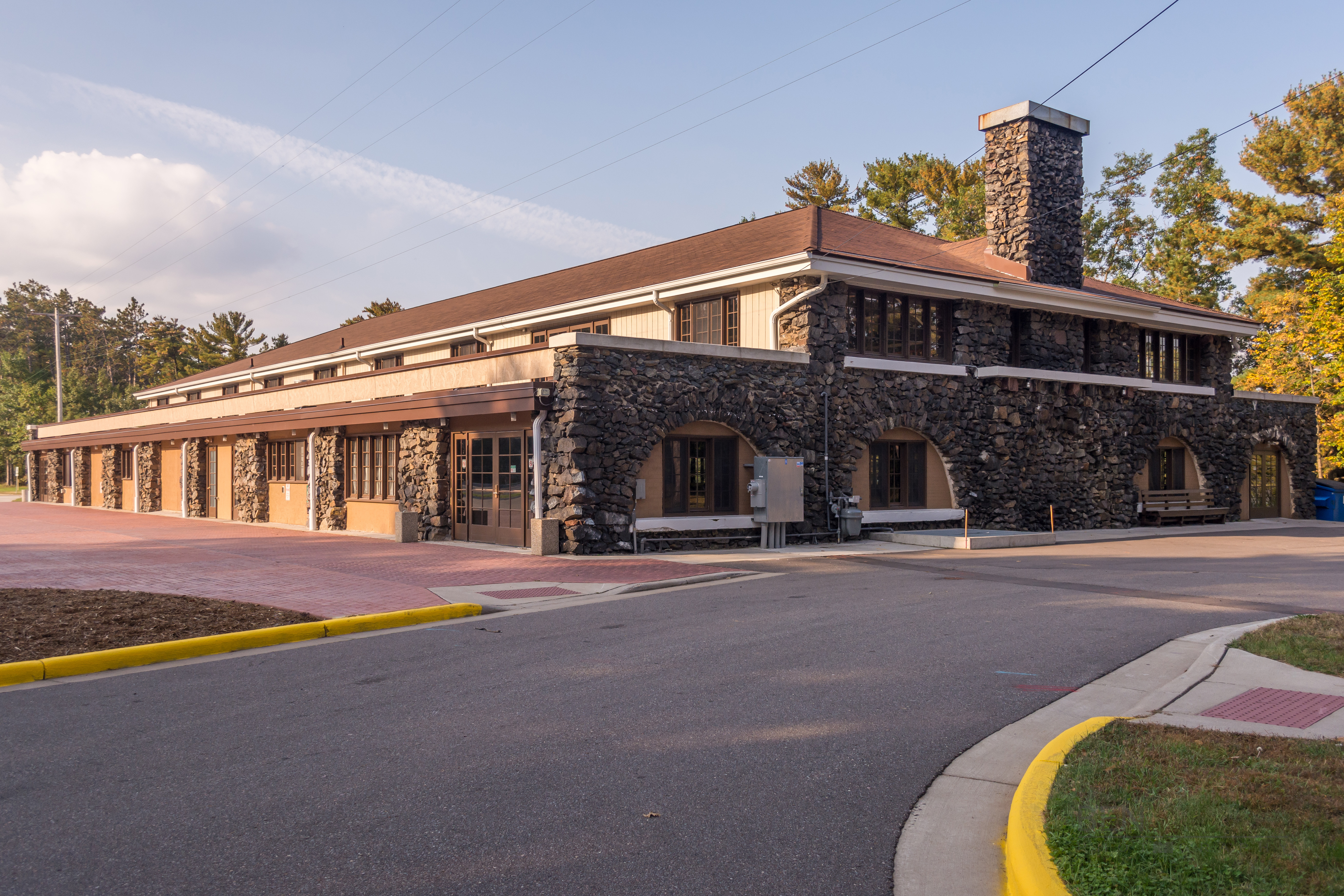
- Location: 1104 Park St. Rothschild, Wisconsin
- Coordinates: 44.89896°N 89.61597°W
- NRHP reference No.: 02000708
- Added to NRHP: June 27, 2002

The Rothschild Pavilion is a dance hall located in Rothschild, Wisconsin. It was added to the National Register of Historic Places in 2002.

The Wausau Street Railway Company built a pavilion at this site in 1908 as an attraction to encourage residents to take the trolley eight miles down from Wausau. This first pavilion was built of timbers, logs and slabs of bark, with burlap curtains in case of rain. This rustic structure burned in 1911 and was replaced with the current building.

The pavilion's wooden dance floor is supported by railroad car springs on top of granite stone foundations, giving it a special bounce effect often referred to as "floating". It is believed to be the only one of its kind in the United States.

The pavilion hosted ballroom dancing accompanied by Lawrence Welk and Guy Lombardo and their orchestras, among others, and later Buddy Holly and his band, and many local functions like wedding dances, proms, and family reunions. The surrounding Pine Park has at times also boasted a baseball field, a zoo, a hockey rink, a ski jump, and a roller coaster.
