= World Senior Games =

Annual Multi-sport senior Competition

Huntsman World Senior Games
- Dates: Annual, every October
- Host city: St. George, Utah, United States
- Venue: Greater Zion Stadium and other venues
- Level: Senior
- Type: Senior Olympics
- Events: 34

The World Senior Games (since 1989 Huntsman World Senior Games for sponsorship reasons) is the largest annual multi-sport senior competition in the world. Most participants are U.S. citizens, but athletes from Canada, Australia, Russia, Japan, Barbados, and several other countries also participate. The Games was founded in 1987 as a not-for-profit 501(c)(3) organization, "with the mission to foster worldwide peace, health and friendship and lead the world in active aging. All athletes aged 50 and over, of all skill levels, are eligible to compete. No pre-qualification is necessary. In addition to self-registered entries, invitation-only tournaments are also included, such as the Global Cup World Senior Volleyball Championships.

In 2018, 11,033 athletes from around the world participated, including 349 softball teams and 213 volleyball teams. Following the tradition of the Olympic Games, opening ceremonies are held at Greater Zion Stadium at Utah Tech University in St. George, Utah, and feature a parade of athletes and a fireworks display. Singing and dancing performances at the opening ceremonies are provided by the performing arts studio Diamond Talent.

In many events, U.S. competitors' results from the competition serve to qualify for the biennial National Senior Games. Swimming events are eligible for setting masters swimming records.

In 1989 Jon Huntsman Sr. of the Huntsman Corporation became the Games' title sponsor. The 2016 games had competitors from 34 countries in 29 sports, the oldest Daniel Bulkley, aged 99. The 2020 competition was cancelled due to the COVID-19 pandemic. The World Senior Games annually brings in an estimated $17 million in direct economic impact to the St. George community. Brigham Young University students have provided free health screenings, conducted research at the games and published findings in peer-reviewed journals, and are a major source of volunteers at the competition.

== Events ==
For 2021, competition was planned in 34 different sports.

1. Archery - 3D
2. Archery - Target
3. Badminton
4. Basketball
5. Bocce
6. Bowling
7. Cowboy action shooting
8. Cycling
9. Golf
10. Horseshoes
11. Lawn bowls
12. Mountain biking
13. Pickleball
14. Power walking
15. Race walking
16. Racquetball
17. Road races
18. Rowing - indoor
19. Rugby
20. Shooting benchrest
21. Shooting handgun
22. Shotgun sports
23. Shuffleboard
24. Soccer
25. Softball
26. Square dance
27. Swimming
28. Table tennis
29. Tennis
30. Track and field
31. Trail running
32. Triathlon
33. Volleyball
34. Walking tours

== See also ==
- Senior Olympics
- Senior sport
- Masters athletics (track and field)
