= Doug Arnot =

American sports executive

Doug Arnot is the Chairman of the Broadstone Group, an international management firm specializing in the planning and delivery of the world’s largest events. Broadstone has provided senior executive consulting and Games planning, management and delivery support to Sydney 2000, Sochi 2014, Baku European Games 2015, Rio 2016, Tokyo 2020, Qatar FIFA World Cup 2022 and Los Angeles 2028.

== Olympics ==
Arnot has been a member of executive management teams for seven organizing committees for the FIFA World Cup and the Olympic Games as well as continental Games and multiple world championships.

Arnot was managing director of venues and operations for the 1996 Atlanta Olympics. Arnot was the Director of Operations for the 2002 Winter Olympics in Salt Lake City. Arnot was director of sport, venues and operations for Chicago's bid for the 2016 Olympics.

In 2009, Arnot was appointed to the London 2012 Olympic Organizing Committee as the Executive Vice President where he was responsible for planning and directing all Games operations. For his work on London 2012 he was honored by Her Majesty the Queen as an Officer of the British Empire.

Arnot has also been awarded the Order of the Rings and the Order of Excellence by the International Olympic Committee.

Arnot has served as advisor to the CEOs of Sochi 2014 and Rio 2016 is now advising the IOC and Los Angeles 2028 Olympics as the Chief of Games Management.

== Rugby ==
Arnot was CEO of USA Rugby from November 14, 2002 until July 14, 2006, USA Rugby grew during Arnot's tenure. In his three-plus years, the national office annual operating budget increased 400 percent from $1 million in 2002 to $4.5 million in 2006, and the membership of USA Rugby grew nearly 10,000 members, from 55,300 year end 2002 to 64,718 in 2005. During Arnot's leadership, the International Rugby Board awarded the U.S. national governing body with a three-year $2.67 million grant to improve its high performance pathways.

Arnot was involved in negotiations to bring more international level rugby to the United States. During Arnot's leadership, the United States was awarded a tournament in 2004 on the IRB Sevens World Series in the USA Sevens, which saw attendance pass the 20,000 fan mark in 2006. In 2006, the U.S. began hosting the Churchill Cup and the North American Four Series, which pitted Canada and the U.S. in cross-border competition.
