= James Chico Hernandez =

American martial artist (born 1954)

James Chico Hernandez (born April 14, 1954) is an American martial artist who competes in Sambo. Born in Pilsen, Chicago, he represented the United States in Sambo and freestyle wrestling at national and international levels over a career spanning several decades. He won the Fédération Internationale Amateur de Sambo World Championships in 2000 and earned multiple AAU national titles in Sambo, Greco-Roman, and freestyle wrestling. Hernandez served in the U.S. Army from 1981 to 2014, attaining the rank of First Sergeant, and was among the first Sambo wrestlers to be featured on a Wheaties cereal box. He was inducted into the AAU Wrestling Hall of Fame in 2012.

== Biography ==
=== Early life ===
Hernandez was born in Pilsen, in the Lower West Side of Chicago, Illinois. He wrestled for Reavis High School, Chicago State University, the University of Maine at Presque Isle, the U.S. Army National Team, and the United States National Sambo Team. He was among the first Sambo wrestlers to be featured on a Wheaties Energy Crunch cereal box.

== Wrestling ==
In January 1975, he received a wrestling scholarship to Chicago State University. By 1976, he placed second in the National Association of Intercollegiate Athletics District #20 at 158 lbs and thus qualified for the NAIA National Wrestling Championships in Edinboro, Pennsylvania, at Edinboro University.

In August 1976, Hernandez transferred to the University of Maine at Presque Isle and competed in the Acadia University Nova Scotia Open in November 1977. In January 1979, while being in university, he competed in and won first place at the University of New Brunswick International Open Championships in Fredericton, New Brunswick, and the USA Wrestling Maine State Freestyle Wrestling Championships. The State of Maine Amateur Athletic Union (AAU) Olympic Freestyle Wrestling All-Star Team selected him to compete against the Netherlands Olympic Freestyle Wrestling Team. He graduated with a Bachelor of Arts degree in Social Science from the University of Maine at Presque Isle in May 1979.

Hernandez enlisted in the United States Army in October 1981. In November 1982, he won the Fort Riley, Kansas Post Freestyle Wrestling Championship in the 158 lbs weight class. In January 1983, Hernandez was selected for the All-Army National Wrestling team at Ft. Bliss, Texas. Hernandez won a Bronze medal at the Texas Tech Wrestling Invitational, where the Army National Team won the team title. In November 1983, he won his second Ft. Riley Post Wrestling Championship in the 158 lbs weight class. He was selected as the "Outstanding Wrestler" of the tournament.

In April 1984, Hernandez participated in the US Olympic Greco-Roman Wrestling Trials. In April 1985, he won the USA Wrestling Vermont State Freestyle Championships in the 163 lbs weight class and in April 1986, he won the USA Wrestling Massachusetts State Freestyle Wrestling Championships in the 180 lbs weight class. In July 1986, he reached the finals in the Bay State Games Freestyle Wrestling competition. Hernandez was named Outstanding Wrestler at the AAU/USA National Sambo Championship in May 1987 held at Howard University, Washington, D.C. He won the AAU National Greco-Roman Masters Championships and the Greco-Roman Masters All-Around Championship and placed 4th in the Greco-Roman Open.

In July 1991, Hernandez won two Gold Medals at the 1991 AAU National Masters Free-Style Wrestling Championships in Battle Creek, Michigan. He won the 35-39 age group and the Masters All-Round Championships and was selected for the "Most Outstanding Wrestler Award" of the tournament. In 1995, he took fifth place as a member of the USA Wrestling National Veterans Team at the Fédération Internationale des Luttes Associées World Veterans Freestyle Wrestling Championships held in Sofia, Bulgaria.

At age 43, Hernandez won three Gold medals, two Silvers, and two Bronzes at the Grand National AAU Wrestling Championships. He participated in Sambo, Greco-Roman, and Freestyle wrestling contests at the 3-day event in 1997, held at Rabobank Arena in Bakersfield, California. In 1999, he won the Fédération Internationale Amateur de Sambo Pan-American Gold and Bronze medals in the 180 lbs weight class. Hernandez competed as a member of the USMC National Sambo Team, which won the US National Sambo Team Championships held at Marine Corps Base Quantico in Quantico, Virginia, in 1999.

In April 2000, Hernandez won the XXV National AAU Sambo Championships held at Disney's Wide World of Sports Complex in Orlando, Florida, and the Fédération Internationale Amateur de Sambo Pan-American Silver medal. In July 2000, Hernandez, aged 46, won the middleweight (163 pounds) Gold medal in the 45-49 age group at the Federation International Association Sambo World Championships held at the Hara Arena in Dayton, Ohio. He also earned the Silver medal in the Masters of the Sport category, which combines champions from all masters' age groups, and a Bronze medal in the open division. He was selected to represent the US at the World Cup of Sombo in Nice, France.

In November 2000, Hernandez led the United States to a second-place finish at the FIAS World Cup of Sambo Wrestling held in Nice, France, and won a silver medal. In November 2001, Hernandez was selected to represent the United States at the FIAS World Cup of Sambo held in Nice, where he took 5th place. In May 2003, he won 2 gold medals at the 6th World AAU Iron Man Wrestling Championships in the Open and Masters divisions in Knoxville, Tennessee. Between 1987 and 2003, Hernandez reportedly received AAU All-American honors on 31 occasions for his accomplishments in wrestling.

In May 2015, Hernandez got double gold in Greco-Roman Wrestling and Olympic Freestyle at the USA Wrestling Veterans National Championships at the U.S. Open at the South Point Hotel, Casino & Spa, Las Vegas, Nevada. Earlier that year, he was crowned at the 2015 Cliff Keen USA Wrestling Folkstyle Nationals in the Veterans divisions, held at the UNIDome on the campus of the University of Northern Iowa in Cedar Falls.

On September 3, 2016, Hernandez won the NAGA Championships of Ireland in the Executive Expert Heavyweight divisions of both GI and No-Gi competitions, and earned a silver medal in the Directors division of the No-Gi competition. The Championships were held at the University Sports Complex of Dublin City University in Dublin, Ireland. On October 20–21, 2018, Hernandez was selected by USA Sambo Inc. to represent the US at the World Masters Sambo Championships at the Stade Mohamed V, Casablanca, Morocco. Competing in the 60-64 age group in the +100 kg weight class, Hernandez defeated Sakhtan Bekpeiisuly of Kazakhstan 5-3 for the Bronze medal.

== Honors and awards ==
In December 2001, Hernandez appeared on a Wheaties Energy Crunch cereal box and participated in a promotional event alongside Olympic champion Mary Lou Retton and Tiger Woods at Madison Square Garden.

Hernandez was featured in CNN/SI "Faces In the Crowd".

He was featured in the Scholastic textbook publication on the state of Maine called "Maine: America the Beautiful".

Hernandez was also featured in Discover Maine, "Maine's History Magazine" in 2010.

The AAU Wrestling Executive Committee announced James "Chico" Hernandez as a 2012 AAU Wrestling Hall of Fame Inductee.

Hernandez was featured in Memories of Maine: The Magazine For Maine History and Nostalgia in 2024.

== Military ==
Hernandez is a US Army veteran. He served from 1981 to 2014, attaining the rank of First Sergeant.

He completed his Combat Basic Training at Fort Dix, New Jersey, in March 1982. He graduated from the premier class of the Soldier Physical Fitness Academy at Fort Benjamin Harrison, Indiana, in 1983 as a Master Fitness Trainer. He graduated from the Warrior Leader Course in Fort Riley, Kansas, in 1984, the Maine Military Academy in 1996, and the Vermont Military Academy in 1997.

He instructed at US Army Post Fort Lewis, Washington in 1991, Fort Indiantown Gap, Pennsylvania, from 1992 to 1994, Fort Bragg, North Carolina, from 1995 to 1996, and Fort Leonard Wood, Missouri, from 1998 to 2002. He served as a Combat Basic Training Instructor at the United States Military Academy from 2002 to 2005.

During his US Army career, Hernandez was awarded the Physical Fitness Badge of Excellence 26 times. In 2003, he received a Challenge coin for his "Superior Performance as an Instructor" at West Point.
