= List of multi-sport events =

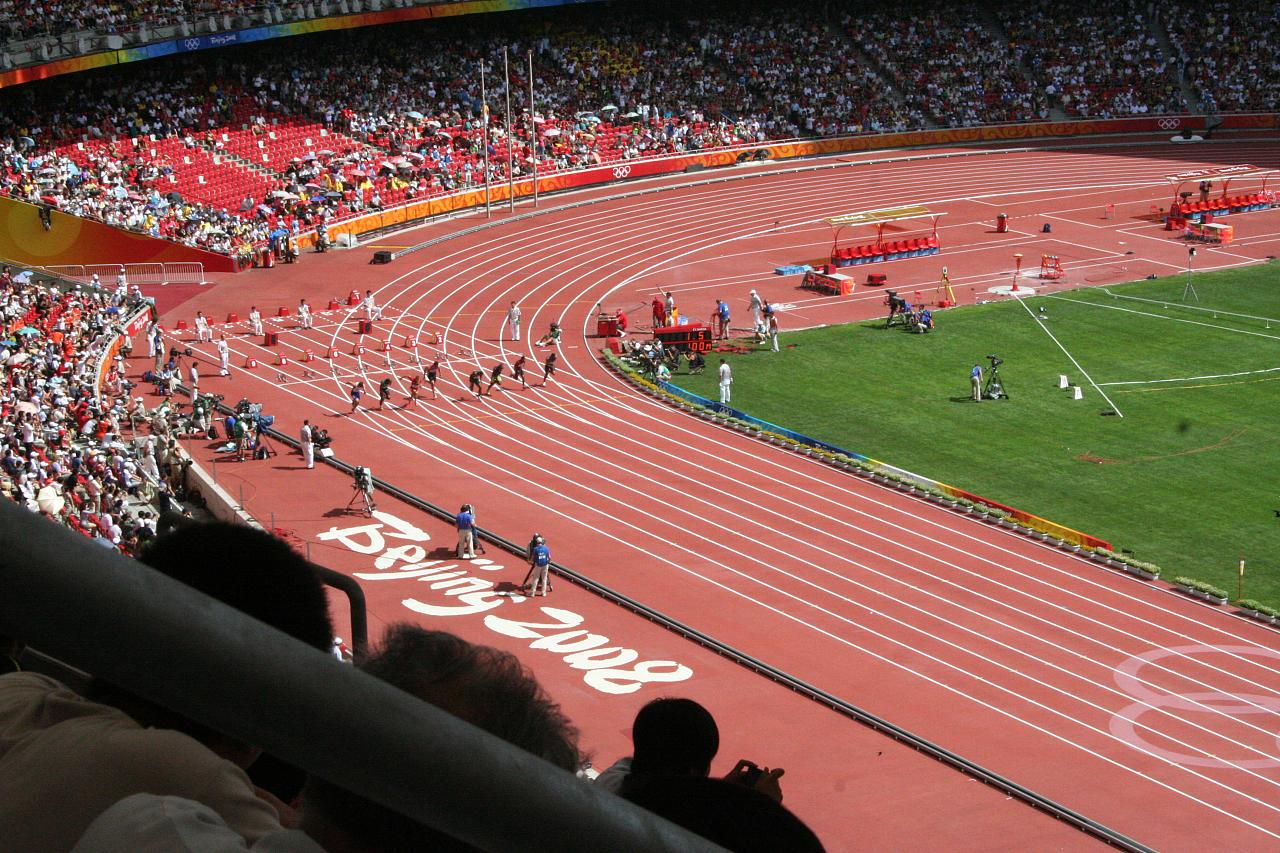
An athletics event in the 2008 Summer Olympics. The Olympic Games, part of the Olympic movement, was the first major, modern, multi-sport event of international significance.

A multi-sport event is an organized sporting event, often held over multiple days, featuring competition in many different sports between organized teams of athletes from (mostly) nation-states. Events are typically held over a few days to accommodate the large number of events held, often more than those in single-sport competitions. The first major, modern, multi-sport event of international significance was the modern Olympic Games. Some of the most recognised sporting events in the world today are multi-sport events – the Asian Games, the Commonwealth Games, the Pan American Games and the Mediterranean Games – among others. This article lists all major multi-sport events, whether defunct or functioning, in the modern day. A full listing of all major multi-sport events is provided in the table below.

Transnational multi-sport events are often organised across concords of cultural elements between nations. These include language, such as the Francophone Games for French-speaking nations; ethnic, such as the Maccabiah Games for Jewish athletes; political, such as the Spartakiad used to oppose the Olympics; occupation, such as the Universiade for university students; and gender, such as World Outgames for the gay community. Participation is also delineated across other lines including region, religion, age, and season (winter instead of summer). A number of multi-sport events are held within nations, where athletes representing various intra-national states or districts compete against each other; these include the Thailand National Games and the National Games of China. These differences in intended audiences are highlighted in the table.

== Historical ==
Prior to the modern day, there were instances of multi-sport events held centuries or millennia in the past. The Tailteann Games, held near modern Telltown in Ireland, was one of the first multi-sport festivals to be recorded, with a history that traces back to 1829 BC. There were several other games held in Europe in the classical era. the Panhellenic Games encompassed the Ancient Olympic Games, which was the precursor to the modern Olympic Games; the Pythian Games; the Nemean Games; and the Isthmian Games. The Roman Games, held in ancient Rome, focused on Greek sports as well as the Etruscan sport of gladiatorial combat. Other multi-sport festivals emerged in the Middle Ages in Europe, including the Cotswold Olimpick Games in England, the Highland games in Scotland still in existence today, and the Olympiade de la République in France in the 19th century.

As these multi-sport events or festivals occurred pre-20th century, when the rules for today's modern sports were largely different or yet to be established, these are not included in the table. The events noted in this section document all known historical multi-sport events.

== Scope ==
Multi-sport events can be classified by scope. Some cater to international audiences; some to regional audiences; and some are held within nations. These differences are presented in the table as well, in addition to other divisions such as ethnicity and historical origins as described earlier.

Only a few modern multi-sport events cater to international audiences without cultural or political boundaries. The most famous of these is the Olympic Games. The others are namely the World Games, established to host sports not within the Olympic scope; the World Mind Sports Games, which hosts competitions in mind sports which are not found in either of the two abovementioned events; the X Games and the Winter X Games, organised for extreme action sports; the World Combat Games, for martial arts and combat sports; and the now-cancelled Goodwill Games.

Similarly, there are also regional multi-sport events held that purely cater to regional audiences regardless of cultural and/or political elements. These are often grouped by continent and sub-continental regions. Each continent has at least one major continental Games; the Asian Games are held for athletes in Asia; In Africa, the African Games perform the same continental function, and in the Americas, the largest multi-sport event that fits the description is the Pan American Games; countries in Oceania compete in the Pacific Games, while Europe has two similar events, the European Games organised by the European Olympic Committees in the tradition of the Olympic Games, and the European Championships, organised by a group of European sports federations.

On a sub-continental and regional level, the Central Asian Games, the East Asian Games, the South Asian Games and the Southeast Asian Games cater to Central Asia, East Asia, South Asia and Southeast Asia respectively, which are all regions of the Asian continent.. The various regions of the Americas are catered for by the South American Games, the Central American and Caribbean Games and the Central American Games. The Games of the Small States of Europe caters for the various island nations and micronations around Europe, while Europe provides the majority of competitors in the Mediterranean Games.

== List of major multi-sport events ==
The criteria in listing a multi-sport event is as follows: The event should have received significant media coverage where it is covered; national, regional, or international. At the same time, organization of the event is taken charge by a formal body, with at least one sport in the event sanctioned by an international sports federation that is recognized by the International Olympic Committee or the General Association of International Sports Federations (GAISF).

Title	Est.^{1}	Next/ Last^{2}	Rec.^{3}	Location^{4}	Scope	Elem.^{5}	Notes
Academic Olympia	1909	1913			International	Age	
Afro-Asian Games	2003	2003	4		Regional		Defunct
ALBA Games	2005	2025	2	Dominica, Roseau	Regional	Colonial ties	
African Games	1965	2027	4	Egypt, Cairo	Regional		
African Beach Games	2019	2027	4	Equatorial Guinea, Riaba	Regional		
African Francophone Games for the Handicapped	1994	2009			Regional	Disabled	Defunct
African Martial Arts Games	2018	2020			Regional		
Africa Military Games	2002	2002			Regional		Defunct
African Para Games	2023	2027	4	Egypt, Cairo	Regional		
African Roller Games	2019	2019			Regional		
African Youth Games	2010	2026	4	Lesotho, Maseru	Regional	Age	
AGBU Games	1955	2012			International		
AGBU European Games	2002	2003			Regional		
AGBU South American Games	2002	2002			Regional		
Alice Springs Masters Games	1986	2024	2	Australia, Alice Springs	National	Age	
All-Africa University Games	1975	2024	1	Nigeria, Lagos	Regional	School	
All-China Games	2000	2010			National		Defunct
All Japan Dental Student Sports Festival	1968	2024			National	School	
Alps-Adriatic Summer Youth Games	1984	2016	2		Regional	Age	
Alps-Adriatic Winter Youth Games	1982	2011	2		Regional	Age	
Arab School Games	1949	2012			Regional	School	
Arab University Games	2018				Regional	School	
Arab University Games for Beach Sports	2016	2016			Regional	School	
Arafura Games	1991	2019	2		International		Defunct
Arctic Winter Games	1970	2026	2	Canada, Whitehorse	Regional		
Armenian Students Sports Games	2002				National	School	
Armenia-Georgia Students Sports Festival	2021		1		Regional	Age	
Arnold Sports Festival	1984	2024	1	United States, Columbus	International		
ASEAN Autism Games	2012	2020	2		Regional	Disability	
ASEAN Civil servant Games	2015	2017			Regional		
ASEAN Deaf Games	2022	2024	2	Indonesia, Jakarta	Regional	Disabled	
ASEAN Para Games	2001	2026	2	Thailand, Nakhon Ratchasima	Regional	Disabled	
ASEAN School Games	2009	2024	2		Regional	School	
ASEAN University Games	1981	2026	2	Malaysia, Kuala Lumpur	Regional	School	
Asem Youth Games	2005	2005			International		Asia and Europe Youth Games
Asian Beach Games	2008	2025	2	Indonesia, Manado	Regional		
Asian Games	1951	2026	4	Japan, Aichi & Nagoya	Regional		
Asian Indoor Games	2005	2009	2		Regional		Merge with Asian Martial Arts Games into Asian Indoor-Martial Arts Games
Asian Indoor-Martial Arts Games	2013	2021 (2024 Hold)	4	Thailand, Bangkok-Chonburi	Regional		
Asian Martial Arts Games	2009	2009	2		Regional		Merge with Asian Indoor Games into Asian Indoor-Martial Arts Games
Asian Martial Arts Games(WMAGC)	2018	2018			Regional		
Asian Para Games	2010	2022 (2023 Hold)	4	China, Hangzhou	Regional	Disabled	
Asian Transplant Games	2002	2002			Regional	Disabled	Defunct
Asian Winter Games	1986	2025	4	China, Harbin	Regional		
Asian Youth Games	2009	2025	4	Bahrain, Manama	Regional	Age	
Asian Youth Para Games	2009	2025	4	Uzbekistan, Tashkent	Regional	Disabled, Age	
Asia Pacific Deaf Games	1984	2024		Iran, Kish Island	Regional	Disability	
Asia Pacific Masters Games	2018		4		Regional	Age	
Asia Pacific Outgames	2008	2014			Regional	Sexual orientation	Defunct
Asia Pacific University Games	2015	2015	2		Regional	Age	Defunct
Asia Pacific Youth Games	2010	2019	1		Regional	Age	Host by Far-Eastern Regional in Russia.
Asia Sports Festival	1998	1998			Regional		
Ataturk Dam International Watersports Games	1995				International		
Atlantic Watersports Games	1995	2024	2	Spain, Bajo GuadIana	Regional	Age	
AUSC Region 5 Youth Games	2004	2024	2	Mozambique, Maputo	Regional	Age	
Aurora Games	2019	2019			International	Gender	For female athletes
Australasian Police and Emergency Services Games	2012	2025	2	Australia, Hobart	National	Occupation	Hold between Australia or New Zealand
Australasian Public Sector Games	1998	2000			National		Defunct
Australia Games	1985	1985			National		
Australia Beach Games	2018				National		
Australia Deaf Games	1964	2024	2	Australia, Newcastle, Lake Macquarie	National	Disabled	
Australia Police Winter Games	1983	2024	1	Australia, Falls Creek	National	Occupation	
Australian Masters Games	1987	2025	2	Australia, Canberra	International	Age	
Australian Youth Olympic Festival	2007	2013	2		International	Age	Defunct
Balkan Games	1929	2024	1		Regional		
Baltic Games (Extreme Sports)	2009	2024	1	Poland, TBA	International		
Baltic Military Games	1989	2010	3		Regional		Defunct
Baltic Military Winter Games	2002	2020	3		Regional		Defunct
Baltic Sea Games	1993	1997	4		Regional		Defunct
Baltic Sea Youth Games	1999	2019	2		Regional		
Bangladesh Games	1978	2024			National		
Bangladesh Youth Games	2018	2026	1		National	Age	
Batang Pinoy	1999	2024		Philippine, Bacolod	National	Age	
Black Sea Games	2007	2007	4		Regional		Defunct
BIMP-EAGA Friendship Games	1996	2023	2	Philippine, Davao City	Regional		Between the regions of the four member countries of the BIMP-EAGA.
Andina Binational Andean Integration Games	1998	2024	1		Regional	Age	Hold between Chile and Argentina.
Binational Games of Araucanía	1992	2023	1	Argentina, Río Negro Province	Regional	Age	Hold between Chile and Argentina.
Para Binational Games of Araucanía	2022	2023	1	Argentina, Río Negro Province	Regional	Age	Hold between Chile and Argentina.
BOLESWA Intervarsity Games	2011		1		Regional	School	
Bolivarian Games	1938	2024	4	Peru, Ayacucho	Regional	Colonial ties	
Bolivarian Beach Games	2012	2019	2		Regional	Colonial ties	
Bolivarian Youth Games	2023	2023		Bolivia, Sucre	Regional	Colonial ties, Age	
Botswana Games	2005		2		National		
BRICS Games	2016	2024	1	Russia, Kazan	International	Political	BRICS economic group Games
Bridge Olympiad	1960	2004	2		International		World Bridge Games
British Transplant Games	1977	2024	1	United Kingdom, Coventry	National		
Jogos Abertos Brasileiros ,(JABs)	1992	2014	1		National		Brazilian National Games
Jogos Brasileiros Paradesportivos	1995	1996	1	Brazil, Joinville	National	Age	Brazilian Para National Games
Jogos Escolares Brasileiros,(JEBs)	2021	2026	1	Brazil, Brasília	National	Age	Brazilian Student Games of age 12–17
Jogos Universitários Brasileiros,(JUBs)	1935	2026	1	Brazil, Goiânia & Trindade	National	Age	Brazilian University Games
Jogos Universitários de Praia Brasileiros	2011	2026		Brazil, Guarapari	National	Age	Brazilian University beach Games
Jogos da Juventude,	2022	2026	1	Brazil, Foz do Iguaçu	National	Age	Brazilian Youth Games
BSME games	2004	2022	1		Regional	School	British school in middle east games
BUCS Nationals	2010	2024	1	Great Britain, Sheffield	National	School	
Can-Am Police-Fire Games	1977	2024	2	United States, Butler	Regional	Occupation	
Canada Summer Games	1969	2025	2	St. John's, Newfoundland and Labrador	National		Includes able-bodied, para sport, and Special Olympics events.
Canada Winter Games	1967	2027	2	Quebec City	National		Includes able-bodied, para sport, and Special Olympics events.
Canada Deaf Games	2012	2024	2	Canada, Toronto	National	Disabled	
Canterbury Centennial Games	1950	1950			National		
CANUSA Games	1958	2024	1		Regional	Age	
Caribbean Games	2022	2025	4	Bahamas, Nassau	Regional		
CARIFTA Games	1972	2024	1	Grenada	Regional		Caribbean Free Trade Association Games
Central African Games	1976	1987			Regional		Defunct
Central American and Caribbean Games	1926	2026	4	Dominican Republic, Santo Domingo	Regional		
Central American and Caribbean Beach Games	2022				Regional		
Central American and Caribbean Junior Games	2024	2024		Honduras, San Pedro Sula	Regional		
Central American Games	1973	2025	4	Guatemala,Guatemala City	Regional		
Central American Para Games	2013	2018	4		Regional	Disabled	
Central Asian Games	1995	2024	4	Kyrgyzstan, Bishkek	Regional		
Central Asian Para Games	2015	2015			Regional	Disability	
Collegiate Nationals	2006	2012			National	Age	
Chess Olympiads	1924	2024	1	Hungary, Budapest	International	Age	
Children of Asia Games	1996	2024	4	Russia, Yakutsk	Regional	Age	
Winter Children of Asia Games	2019		4		Regional	Age	
China National Youth Games	2015	2019	4		National		Merge with China National Student Games into China Student (Youth) Games
Chinese Transplant Games	2006				National		
CIS Games	2021	2025	4	Azerbaijan, TBA	Only First edition in 2021 was Regional. 2023 and 2025 editions held in Belarus and Azerbaijan respectively included non CIS countries as participants		For athletes in CIS organization nations
Citizens Sports Games	2000	2024	2	Taiwan, Pingtung County	National		Non-Olympics events
Colombia National Games	1928	2027	4	Colombia	National		Non-Llympics events
Colombia National Para Games	2004	2027	4	Colombia	National		Non-Paralympics events
Commonwealth Games	1930	2026	4	TBA	International	Colonial ties, Language	For athletes in commonwealth nations.
Commonwealth Paraplegic Games	1962	1974	4		International	Colonial ties, Language, Age	Defunct
Commonwealth Winter Games	1958	1966	4		International	Colonial ties, Language, Age	Defunct
Commonwealth Youth Games	2000		4		International	Colonial ties, Language, Age	
Community Games	1967	2024			National	Age	Irish independent voluntary organization
Continental Martial Arts Games	2011	2011			International		
Cook Islands Games	2020	2024	2		National		
Cook Islands Beach Games	2018	2024	2		National		
Cook Islands University Games	2021				National		
Counter Olympics	1932	1932			International		
Country Senior High Schools Carnival (Western Australia)	2005	2024			National	Age	
World Summer Corporate Games	1988	2023	1		International		Also has regional or national events
World Winter Corporate Games	2019	2023	1		International		
Costarican University Games (JUNCOS)	1992		1		National	School	
CPISRA World Games	1989	2018	4		International	Disabled	Merge with IWAS World Games into World Abilitysport Games
CPLP Games	1990	2018	2		International	Age, Language	
CSIT World Sports Games	2009	2025	2	Greece, Loutraki	International		
CUCSA Games	1996	2024	2		Regional	Age	Involve ten southern African nations
Summer Deaflympics	1924	2025	4	Japan, Tokyo	International	Disabled	Longest running multi-sport event excluding the Olympic Games.
Winter Deaflympics	1949	2024	4	Turkey, Ankara-Erzurum	International	Disabled	
Deaf Sports Carnivals	1911	1911			International	Disabled	Defunct
Défi sportif	1984	2024	1	Canada, Quebec	International	Disabled	
Dod Warrior Games	2010	2024	1	United States, Orlando	International	Occupation, Disabled	For injured military. Held by Department of defense, the United States.
DPR Korea Championship	1972	2024	1	North Korea, TBA	National		
East African Community Games	2018				Regional		
East African Military Games	1982	1982			Regional	Occupation	
East African Military Community Games	2005	2019			Regional	Occupation	
East African Schools Games	2002	2019	1		Regional	School	
Eastern Africa University Games	1999		1		Regional	Age	
East Asian Games	1993	2013	4		Regional		Included Pacific island of Guam (Oceania). Transform to East Asian Youth Games.
East Asian Youth Games	2023	2027	4	South Korea, Gwacheon	Regional	Age	
Eastern European Transplant Games	1996	1996			Regional	Disabled	
eGames	2016	2016	2		International		Esports
Elderly Sports and Fitness Conference of People's Republic of China	2009	2017	4		National	Age	
Enhanced Games	2026	2026		United States, Winchester	International		Performance-enhancing substances use permitted without being subject to drug tests
Phygital Games of the Future	2024	2024		Russia, Kazan	International		Phygital sport
EuroGames	1992	2024	1	Austria, Vienna	Regional	Sexual orientation	
European Championships (multi-sport event)	2018	2022	4		Regional		Defunct
European Games	2015	2027	4	TBA	Regional		
European Company Sports Games of Summer	1977	2023		France, Bordeaux	Regional		
European Company Sports Games of Winter	1990	2023		France, Bordeaux	Regional		
European Heart/Lung Transplant Games	1988	2024	2		Regional	Disabled	
European Maccabi Games	1963		4		Regional	Religion	
European Maccabi Youth Games	2024	2024			Regional	Religion	
European Martial Arts Games	2011		2		Regional		
European Masters Games	2008	2027	4	Italy, Como	Regional	Age	
European Para Championships	2023	2027		TBA	Regional	Disabled	
European Para Youth Games	2011	TBA	2	TBA	Regional	Age	
European Para Winter Youth Games	2020				Regional	Age	2020 but not held.
European Police and Fire Games	2006	2020	2		Regional	Occupation	
European Sports Festival	2019	2019			Regional		
European Transplant and Dialysis Games	2000	2024	2		Regional		
European Universities Games	2012	2024	2	Hungary, Debrecen, Miskolc	Regional	School	
European Winter Games (For Police & Firefighter & Paramedics)	2019	2023	4	Finland, Kuopio	Regional	Occupation	
European Youth Olympic Festival	1991	2025	2	North Macedonia, Skopje	Regional	Age	
European Youth Olympic Winter Festival	1993	2025	2	Georgia, Borjomi-Bakuriani	Regional	Age	
Extremity Games	2006	2016	1		International	Disabled	Defunct
Far Eastern Championship Games	1913	1934	2		Regional		Defunct. Precursor to the Asian Games.
Federal Youth Games of Olympics	1969		1		National	School	For German schools and international schools
Federal Youth Games of Paralympics	2012		1		National	School	For German schools and international schools
FESPIC Games	1975	2006	4		Regional	Disabled	Defunct. Merge into Asian Paralympic Games.
FESPIC Youth Games	2003	2003	-		Regional	Age, Disabled	Defunct. Precursor to the Asian Youth Para Games.
Festival of Empire	1911	1911			Regional		
FIA Motorsport Games	2019	2024	2	Spain, Valencia	International		
FICEP-FISEC Games	1987		2		International	Age, Religion	
Fiji Games	2004				National		
FIM Intercontinental Games	2024	2026	1	Spain, Andalusia	International		
FIS Games	2028	2028	4		International		
FISU America Games	2018	2024	2	Colombia, Cali	Regional	Age	Merge with South American University Games.
FISU World University Summer Games(Summer Universiade)	1959	2025	2	Germany, Rhine-Ruhr	International	Age	
FISU World University Winter Games(Winter Universiade)	1960	2025	2	Italy, Torino	International	Age	
Friendship Games	1984	1984	-		Political		Defunct. For athletes who did not participate in the 1984 Summer Olympics.
Friendship Military Spartakiads of Summer	1958	1989			National	Occupation	
Friendship Military Spartakiads of Winter	1961	1987			National	Occupation	
FSM games ,(Federated States of Micronesia Games)	1995	2005			National		
Games of the New Emerging Forces (GANEFO)	1963	1963	4		International		Defunct. Set up by Indonesia as a counter to the Olympic Games, with participation meant for so-called "emerging nations".
Asian Games of the New Emerging Forces (Asian GANEFO)	1966	1966	4		Region		Defunct. For antiboycott of 1966 Asian Games.
Games of the Small States of Europe	1985	2025	2	Andorra, Andorra la Vella	Regional	Population size	
Gascoyne Games	1994	2023		Australia, Carnarvon	Regional		For the West Australia intra-regional, ceased in 2015, but 2021 revive
Gay Games	1982	2022 (2023 Hold)	4	Hong Kong	International	Sexual Orientation	Organized by LGBT community people but no limitation of sexual orientation
GCC Games	2011	2026	4	Qatar, Doha	Regional		Persian Gulf regional nationals
GCC Beach Games	2010	2025	-	Oman, TBA	Regional		Persian Gulf regional nationals
GCC Women's Games	2008	2026	2	Qatar, Doha	Regional	Gender	Persian Gulf regional nationals
GCC Youth Games	2024	2024	2	United Arab Emirates, Dubai	Regional	Age	Persian Gulf regional nationals
GCC Martial Arts and Indoor Games	2024	2024	2	Saudi Arabia, TBA	Regional	Age	Persian Gulf regional nationals
Georgian Universiade	2021				National	School	
German Combat Games	1922	1937			National		Defunct
Global Esports Games	2021	2023	1	Saudi Arabia, Riyadh	International		Organized by Global Esports Federation, not International Esports Federation.
Summer Goodwill Games	1986	2001	4		International		Defunct. Reaction to the political troubles surrounding the Olympic Games in the 1980s.
Winter Goodwill Games	2000	2000	4		International		Defunct
Gorge Games	1996	2011			International		Defunct
Winter Gorge Games	2009	2009			International		Defunct
Gratitude Games	2023	TBA	1		National	Occupation	For workers in the UK's NHS, police, fire service and other emergency services.
Summer Gravity Games	1999	2006			International		Defunct. For extreme sport games
Winter Gravity Games	2000	2000			International		Defunct. For extreme sport games
Gravity Games H2O	2005	2005			International		
Hapoel Games	1928	1995			Regional		
Highland Games	1836	2023	1	Scotland, Somewhere	National		Hold in Scotland and other countries with a large Scottish diaspora
Hong Kong Games	2007	2024	2	Hong Kong	National		
Huntsman World Senior Games	1987	2023	2	United States, St. George, Utah	International	Age	
IBSA World Games	1998	2027	4		International	Disabled	
IBSA World Youth Games	2005	2017			International	Disabled, Age	
Iceland Winter Games	2014		1		National		
Indian Ocean Island Games	1979	2027	4	Comoros, TBA	Regional		
Indian Ocean Youth and Sport Commission Games	1994	2025		Seychelles, TBA	Regional	Age	
Indian Rim Asian University Games	2007	2011			Regional	School	
Indigenous Nationals	1996	2024	1	Australia, New South Wales, University of Wollongong	National	Ethnicity	For Indigenous Australians with qualification in Australian University or tertiary institutions.
Inter-Allied Games	1919	1919	-		Regional		Defunct
International Army Games	2015	2024	1	Russia, Moscow	International	Occupation	
International Children's Games	1968	2024	1	Mexico, Leon	International	Age	
International Children's Winter Games	1994		2		International	Age	
Invictus Games	2014	2025	2	Canada, Vancouver-Whistler	International	Occupation	For wounded, injured military.
ISF Educational Games	2014	2020			International	School	
ISF European Schools Games	1992	2004			International	School	
ISF Gymnasiade School Summer Games	1974	2024	2	Bahrain, Manama	International	Age	
ISF Gymnasiade School Winter Games	2018	2023	2	Turkey, Erzurum	International	Age	
ISF Pan American Schools Games	2013	2017			International	School	
ISF Universal Teacher Games	2022	2022	1		International	School	
ISF World Cool Games	2019	2022	1		International	School	
ISF World School Beach Games	2022	2022	1		International	School	
ISF World School Combat Games	2017	2021	2		International	School	
ISF World School Games U12	2025	2025			International	Age	
ISF World School Games U15	2021	TBA	2		International	Age	
ISF World School E-Sports Games	2019	2022	1		International	Age	E-sport
ISF World School Inclusive Games	2019	2019			International	School, Disabled	
Inter-High School Championships of Japan	1963	2024	1	Japan, Fukuoka Prefecture	National	Age	
International University Beach Games	2015	2019	2		International	School	
International ASA Games	1968	2019	1		National		
International ASA Winter Games	1996	2019	1		National		
International Festival of Martial Arts Pearl of Kyrgyzstan	2017	2024	1		National		
International Issyk-Kul Sports Games	2001	2024	1		National		
International Law Enforcement Games	1974	2000			International	Occupation	
International Winter Sports Week (France)	1907	1929	1		International		
International Winter Sports Week (Germany)	1937	2024	1	Germany, Garmisch-Partenkirchen	International		
International Workers' Olympiads of Summer	1921	1943			International	Occupation	
International Workers' Olympiads of Winter	1925	1937			International	Occupation	
International Youth Games	2014	2024	1	Germany, Rendsburg	International	Age	Host by 4 city: Aalborg, Almere, Rendsburg and Lancaster.
Islamic Games	1980	1980			Regional		
Islamic Solidarity Games	2005	2025		Cameroon, Yaoundé	Regional		Involves member-states of the Organisation of the Islamic Conference.
Island Games	1985	2025	2	Orkney, Orkney	Regional		
IWAS World Games	1948	2022	1		International	Disabled	Merge with CPISRA World Games into World Abilitysport Games
IWAS World Winter Games			1		International	Disabled	Defunct
IWAS Youth World Games	2005	2016	1		International	Disabled, Age	Defunct
ISAF World Sailing Games	1994	2006			International		
JCC Maccabi Youth Games	1982	2024		United States, Houston	National	Age, Religion	
Jeux de la Francophonie	1989	2025	4	Canada, TBA	International	Colonial ties, Language	
Jeux des îles	1997	2024	1	TBA	Regional	Population Size	
Jeux Mondiaux De La Paix	1983	2010			International		
Jogos Sul-Americanos Escolares	1976	2023	2		Regional	Age	South American School Games.
Jubilee Games	2008	2016			International		
Juegos Deportivos de Universidades Centro America	2006	TBA	1		Regional	School	Central America University Games.
Juegos Deportivos Escolares Nacionales de Peru	1993				National	Age	
Juegos Universitarios Argentinos	2014				National	Age	
Juegos Universitarios Nacionales de Nicaragua	2014				National	Age	
Juegos Evita	1948	2024	1		National		Argentina National Games.
Junior Pan American Games	2021	2025	4	Peru, TBA	Regional	Age	
Khelo India Para Games	2018		1	India, TBA	National	Disabled	
Khelo India School Games	2018	2018	1		National	School	
Khelo India University Games	2020	2024	1	India, TBA	National	Age	
Khelo India Winter Games	2020	2024	1	India, TBA	National		
Khelo India Youth Games	2020	2024	1	India, TBA	National	Age	
Kingdom Games	1995	2009	2		Regional		Defunct, Netherlands Antilles country, because these organization has been dissolved, so this games will not been continued.
Korean National Youth Sports Festival	1972	2023	1	South Korea, Ulsan	National		
Korean National Para Games	1981	2023	1	South Korea, South Jeolla Province	National		
Korean National Sports Festival	1920	2023	1	South Korea, South Jeolla Province	National		
Korean National Leisure Sports Festival	2001	2023	1		National		
Korean National Winter Para Games	2004	2023	1	South Korea, Seoul, Gangwon, Daegu–Gyeongbuk	National		
Korean National Winter Sports Festival	1920	2023	1	South Korea, Seoul, Gangwon, Daegu–Gyeongbuk	National		
Korean National Winter Leisure Sports Festival	2015	2018	1		National		
Korean National Youth Para Games	2008	2023	1	South Korea, Ulsan	National	Disabled, Age	
Korean National Harmony Leisure Sports Festival	2022	2023	1		National		
Las Justas	1929				National	School	
Lakota Nation Invitational	1976	2023	1	United States, Rapid City	National		
Latin American Games	1922	1922			Regional		
Latin American Transplant Games	1998	1998			Regional	Disabled	
Liberty Bell Classic	1980	1980	-		International		
Lithuanian National Olympics	1938	2006	4		International		First games held in 1938, but 2nd games did not held until 1998.
Lusophony Games	2006	2024	4	Brazil, Goiânia	International	Colonial ties, Language	
Luso-Brazilian Sports Games	1960	1972			Regional		
Macau Games	2014		2	Macau	National		
Maccabiah Games	1932	2025	4	Israel, Jerusalem	International		
Maccabi Winter Games	2023	2026			International		
Maccabiah Winter Games	1933	1936			International		
Maccabi Youth Games	2018		4		Regional	Age, Religion	
Manea Games	2008	2023	3		National		Cook Island
Masters Indigenous Games	2023		2		International		
Mediterranean Games	1951	2026	4	Italy, Taranto	Regional		
Mediterranean Beach Games	2015	2027	4	Portugal, Portimão	Regional		
MED Senior Games	2022	2024	2		International	Age	
Micronesian Games	1969	2024	4	Marshall Islands, Majuro	Regional		
Middle East/Mediterranean Scholar-Athlete Games	2000	2000			International	Occupation	
CISM World Solidarity Games	2023				International	Occupation	Military personnel
Military Winter World Games	2010	2025	4	Switzerland, Bern	International	Occupation	Military personnel
Military World Games	1995	2027	4	Colombia, Bogotá	International	Occupation	Military personnel
Military World Cadet Games	2010	2026			International	Occupation	Military personnel
Mind Sports Olympiad	1997	2024	1		International		Reduced in size after 2000.
Move United Junior Nationals	1984	2024	1	Alabama, Birmingham, Hoover	National	Disabled, Age	
MTC Youth Games	2018	2021 (2023 Hold)	2	Namibia, TBA	National	Age	National youth games of Namibia
Naadam	1921	2024			National		Is a traditional festival in Mongolia and Inner Mongolia.
National Biennial Games of Singapore	2010		2		National		
National Community Games of Singapore	2012		1		National		
National Games of the People's Republic of China	1910	2025	4	China, Guangdong.Hong Kong.Macau	National		
National Para Games of China	1984	2025	4	China, Guangdong.Hong Kong.Macau	National	Disability	
National Winter Games of China	1959	2024	4	China, Hulunbuir	National		
National Games of Chile	2013	2024	2	Chile, TBA	National		
National Games of Colombia	1928	TBA	4	Colombia, TBA	National		
Paranational Games of Colombia	2004	TBA	4	Colombia, TBA	National	Disabled	
National Sports Games of Sea and Beach of Colombia	2013	2025	2	Colombia, TBA	National		
National Games of Costa Rica	1976	2024	1	Costa Rica, Guanacaste Province	National		
Paranational Games of Costa Rica	2009	2016			National	Disabled	
National Games of India	1924	2023	1	India, Goa	National		
National Winter Games of India	2007	2015			National		
National Games of Nepal	1982	2024	2	Nepal, Karnali	National		
National Games of Pakistan	1948	2023		Pakistan, Quetta	National		
National Games of Taiwan	1946	2023	2	Taiwan, Tainan City	National		
National Games of Uruguay	2017				National		
National Games of Venezuela	1978				National		
National Para Games of Venezuela	2011				National	Disabled	
National Deaf Games of Malaysian	2014	2016			National	Disabled	
National Deaf Games of Singapore	2015	2021	2		National	Disabled	
National Disabled Games of Taiwan	1993	2024	2	Taiwan, Nantou County	National	Disability	
National Youth Games of Nigeria	2016		1	Nigeria, TBA	National	Age	National Youth games in Nigeria.
National High School Games	2001	2024	1	Taiwan, Taipei	National		
National Indigenous Games of Taiwan	1999	2025	2	Taiwan, Kaohsiung	National	Ethnicity	
National Intellectual Games	2009	2023	4	China, Hefei	National		China Mind Sports Games.
National Intercity Games of the People's Republic of China	1988	2015	4		National		
National Intercollegiate Athletic Games	1970	2024	1	Taiwan, Taichung City, National Taiwan University of Sport	National	Age	
National Intercollegiate Deaf Athletic Games	2000	2011			National	Disabled	
National Children and Youth Olympiad of Mexico	1996	2019			National	Age	
National Paralympic Week	1957	2024	4	Indonesia, TBA	National		
National Peasants' Games	1988	2016	4		National	Occupation	Ceased in 2016, 2012 is last edition.
National Red Games	2010	2011			National		
National School Games of Singapore	1954		1		National	School	
National Sports Festival of Japan	1946	2023	1	Japan, Kagoshima Prefecture	National		
National Sports Week	1948	2024	4	Indonesia, Aceh–North Sumatra, TBA	National		
National Sports Winter Festival of Japan	2005	2023	1	Japan, Aomori Prefecture	National		
National Sports Tournament for the Disabled of Japan	2001	2023	1	Japan, Kagoshima Prefecture	National	Disabled	
National High School Student Sports Games of the People's Republic of China	1973	2011			National	Age	
National University Student Sports Games of the People's Republic of China	1982	2012			National	Age	
National Universiade	1993				National		Mongolia University Games
National Veterans Wheelchair Games	1981				National	Disabled	
National Student Sports Games of the People's Republic of China	2014	2021			National	Age	Merge with National Youth Games into National Student (Youth) Sports Games of the People's Republic of China
National Student (Youth) Sports Games of the People's Republic of China	2023	2023		China, Guangxi	National	Age	Merge with National Student Sports Games of the People's Republic of China and China National Youth Games.
National Traditional Games of Ethnic Minorities of the People's Republic of China	1953	2023	4	China, Hainan, Haikou	National		
National Youth Olympics of Cross Country Races of Polish	1997	2011			National		
National Youth Olympics of Indoor Sports of Polish	1995	2023	1	Poland, Western Pomerania	National		
National Youth Olympics of Mental Sports of Polish	2012	2014			National		
National Youth Olympics of Summer Sports of Polish	1995	2023	1	Poland, Silesia	National		
National Youth Olympics of Winter Sports of Polish	1996	2023	1	Poland, Podkarpackie Province	National		
Nauru National Games	2009	2009			National		
Neom Beach Games	2022				National		
NSW Police & Emergency Services Games	1984	2024	4	Australia, New South Wales	National	Occupation	
New Zealand Deaf Games	1956		2		National	Disabled	
New Zealand Games	1975	1975			National		
New Zealand Masters Games	1989	2023	1	New Zealand, Whanganui	National	Age	
New Zealand University Games	1902	2009			National		Replace by National Tertiary Championship
New Zealand Winter Games	2009	2024	2		National		National games in New Zealand, and restrict winter events.
Nigerian National Sports Festival	1973	2022	1	Nigeria, Asaba	National		
Nigerian University Games	1966	2024	4	Nigeria, University of Jos	National	School	
Nitro World Games	2016	2021 (2022 Hold)	1	Australia, Brisbane	International		
Hot Wheels Nitro Junior Games	2019	2021	2	United States, Chino	International	Age	
Nordic Games	1901	1926			Regional		
North American Indigenous Games	1990	2023	3	Canada, Halifax, Nova Scotia	Regional		
North American Outgames	2007	2016	-		Regional	Sexual orientation	
North Queensland Games	1986	2024	1	Australia, Cairns	National		intra-national games
Northern University Games	2005	2005			Regional		an Australian inter-varsity multi-sport competition.
Summer Olympic Games	1896	2028	4	USA, Los Angeles	International		
Winter Olympic Games	1924	2030	4	France, French Alps	International		
Olympic Virtual Sports Festival	2023	2023		Singapore, Singapore	International	Occupation	Military personnel
Pacific Games	1963	2027	4	French Polynesia, Pirae	Regional		
Pacific Mini Games	1981	2025	4	Palau, Koror	Regional		
Pacific Ocean Games	1995	1995			Regional		This multi-sport event is between countries of the Pacific Rim, but only take place an edition.
Pacific School Games	1982		4		Regional	School	
Palarong Pambansa	1948	2022	1	Philippine, Metro Manila, Marikina	National	Age	Sport Events held annually for the elementary and high school students in the Philippines
Pan American Games	1951	2027	4	Peru, Lima	Regional		
Pan American Deaf Youth Games	2000	2006			Regional	Disabled	
Winter Pan American Games	1990	1990	4		Regional		Defunct
Pan American Games for Patients with Asthma	2000	2000			Regional	Disabled	
Pan American Games for the Blind	1997	1999			Regional	Disabled	
Pan American Games for the Deaf	1975	2019			Regional	Disabled	
Pan American Maccabi Games	1967	2023	4	Argentina, Buenos Aires	Regional	Religion	
Pan American Martial Arts Games	2020				Regional		
Pan American Masters Games	2016	2024	2	United States, Cleveland	International	Age	
Pan American Sports Festival	2014	2014	4		Regional		
Pan American Wheelchair Games	1967	1999			Regional	Disabled	
Pan Arab Games	1953	2027	4	Saudi Arabia, Riyadh	Regional		
Pan Arab Games for the Handicapped	1999	2003			International	Disabled	Mergr into Pan Arab Games.
Pan-Armenian Summer Games	1999	2023	4	Armenia, Gyumri	International		
Pan-Armenian Winter Games	2014	2014			International		
Pan Homenetmen Games	2012	2024			International	Ethnics	
Pan Pacific Masters Games	1998	2022	2	Australia, Queensland	Regional	Age	
Paralympic Games	1960	2028	4	USA, Los Angeles	International	Disabled	
Paralympic Winter Games	1976	2026	4	Italy, Milan, Cortina d'Ampezzo	International	Disabled	
Parapan American Games	1999	2027	4	Peru, Lima	Regional	Disabled	
Youth Parapan American Games	2005	2023	4	Colombia, Bogotá	Regional	Disabled, Age	
PCU Games	1999	2023	1	Belgium, Antwerp	International	Age	Formerly known as World Interuniversity Games.
People's Olympiad	1936	1936	-		International	Political ideology	Protest against the 1936 Summer Olympics held in Berlin under Nazi rule.
Philippine National Games	1994				National		
Philippine ROTC Games	2023				National	Occupation	
Philippine University Games	1996		1		National	School	
Punjab Games	2004	2006			National		
Qeltic Games	2023	2023		Australia, Perth	National	Sexual Orientation	
Red Sport International of Summer	1921	1931			International		
Red Sport International of Winter	1928	1928			International		
Respublika Universiade	2008		1		International		
Reykjavik International Games	2008	2023	1	Iceland, Reykjavík	International		
Russian-Chinese Summer Youth Games	2015	2024			Regional	International	
Russian-Chinese Winter Youth Games	2016	2024			Regional	International	
SAIMSA Games	2014	2026			Regional		
Saudi Games	2022	2022	1	Saudi Arabia, Riyadh	National		Due to COVID-19 pandemic postponed to 2022.
SAUSSA Games	1999	2019			Regional	School	
SELL Student Games	1923	2023	1	Estonia, Tartu	International	Age	
SELL Student Winter Games	1929	1940	1		International	Age	
Senior Olympics	1987	2023	2	Pennsylvania, Pittsburgh	International	Age	
Senior Winter Olympics	2000	2011	1		International	Age	Winter National Senior Games.
Seven Universities Athletic Meet	1962	2023	1	Japan, University of Tokyo	National	Age	
Sky Games	2000	2012			International		Trailrunning Events.
South African Indigenous Games Festival	2005	2024	1		National		
South American Games	1978	2026	4	Argentina, Rosario, Santa Fe	Regional		
South American Beach Games	2009	2023	4	Colombia, Santa Marta	Regional		
South American Deaf Games	2014	2019			Regional	Disabled	
South American Masters Games	2021	TBA		TBA	Regional	Age	
South American Para Games	2014				Regional	Disabled	
South American University Games	2004	2019	2		Regional	School	Merge Into FISU America Games.
South American Youth Games	2013	2025	4		Regional	Age	
South Asian Games	1984	2023	2	Pakistan, Lahore	Regional		
South Asian Beach Games	2011	2011			Regional		
South Asian Winter Games	2011	2011			Regional		
South Australian Masters Games	1996	2023	1	Australia, Copper Coast	National		
South Pacific Games	1963	2007	4		Regional		
South Pacific Masters Games	2000	2002			Regional	Age	
Southeast Asian Games	1959	2027	2	Malaysia, Kuala Lumpur, Sarawak, Penang and Johor	Regional		
Southern University Games	2003	2017			Regional		an Australian inter-varsity multi-sport competition.
Summer Spartakiad	1928	1931			International	Political ideology	Organised by Red Sport International sponsored by the Soviet Union.
Winter Spartakiad	1928	1936			International	Political ideology	Organised by Red Sport International sponsored by the Soviet Union.
Summer Spartakiad of the Peoples of the USSR	1956	1991	4		National		Internal events in the Soviet Union.
Winter Spartakiad of the Peoples of the USSR	1962	1990	4		National		Internal events in the Soviet Union.
Special Olympics National Summer Games in New Zealand	1985	2022	4	New Zealand, Hamilton	Regional	Disabled	
Special Olympics National Winter Games in New Zealand	2005	2023	4	New Zealand, TBA	Regional	Disabled	
Special Olympics USA	2006	2026	4	United States, Minnesota	Regional	Disabled	
Special Olympics Summer World Games	1968	2023	4	Germany, Berlin	International	Disabled	
Special Olympics Winter World Games	1977	2025	4	Italy, Turin	International	Disabled	
Asia Pacific Summer Special Olympic Games	2013	2025		Japan, Utsunomiya	International	Disabled	
European Summer Special Olympic Games	1981	2024		Switzerland, Nyon, Lausanne	International	Disabled	
Special Olympics Pan African Games	2020	2024	2	Rwanda, TBA	Regional	Disabled	
SportAccord World Mind Games	2011	2014			International		Defunct
Somaliland Regional Games	2011				National		
South African Games	1964	1986			National		Defunct
Shanghai International Games	1926	1937			International		
Singapore University Games	2006				National	School	
Southern Games	1964	2026	1	Trinidad and Tobago, Trinidad	International		Originally known as Texaco Sports, athletics and cycling only
Sri Lanka University Games	1980	2019			National	School	
State Games of America (National Congress of State Games component games listed below)	1999	2026	2	Pennsylvania, State College	National		
Starty nadezhd	1975	1975			International		
Sukma Games	1986	2024	4	Malaysia, Johor	National		
Para Sukma Games	1982	2024	2	Malaysia, Johor	National		
Swedish Games	1916	1922			National		
TAFISA World Martial Arts Festival	2019	2023	4		International		
TAFISA World Sport for All Games	1992	2024	4	Russia, Nizhny Novgorod	Regional		Focus on traditional sports and games(TSG).
TAFISA European Sport for All Games	2018	2022	4	Italy, Perugia	Regional		
Tailteann Games	1924	1932	4		International	Ethnicity	A revival of the ancient Tailteann Games of Gaelic Ireland
Thailand National Games	1967	2023	2	Thailand, Kanchanaburi	National		
Thailand National Youth Games	1985	2023	1	Thailand, Nakhon Sawan	National	Age	
Thailand Sports University Games	1995	2023	1	Thailand, Ubon Ratchathani University	National	School	
The Norway Championships Week of Summer (NM Week)	2018	2022	1	Norway, Bergen, Moss	National		
The Norway Championships Week of Winter (NM Week)	2020	2022	1	Norway, Skien	National		
Asia Pride Games (The Straits Games)	2002	2023	4	Cambodia, Phnom Penh	Regional	Sexual orientation	the name “ Asia Gay Sports” was first coined in 2014.
The Finnish Championships Week (SM-viikko)	2016	2023	1	Finland, Lahti	National		
The Swedish Championships Week of Summer (SM Week)	2009	2023	1	Sweden, Umeå	National		
The Swedish Championships Week of Winter (SM Week)	2009	2023	1	Sweden, Skövde	National		
The World Children's Winners Games	2010				International	Age	
Transplant Games of America	2018	2022	2	United States, San Diego	Regional		
Tras-Andean Games (Trasandina Youth Sports Games)	1998		1		International	Age	Between the countries of Argentina, Bolivia, Chile and Peru since 1998
Trinidad and Tobago Beach Games	2018		2		National		
Trisome Games	2016				International	Disabled	
Euro Trisome Games	2021				International	Disabled	
Tropic Cup Games	1962	1964			Regional		Central Africa Sport Tropical Countries Games.
Turkic International Youth Festivals	2016				Regional	Age	
Turkic Universiade	2018				Regional	School	
Tuvalu Games	2008	2011			National		
U.S. Olympic Festival	1978	1995			National		
UK School Games	2006	2022	1		National	Age	
UniSport Nationals	1992	2023	1	Australia, Gold Coast	National	Age	Australia University Games.
United World Games	2005	2022	2		International	Age	This Games can distinguish from U10.U12.U14.U16.U18 Level.
University International Sports Festival	2023	2023	1	Russia, Yekaterinburg	National	Age	
USIP World Police Games	2015		2		International	Occupation	
Vietnam National Games	1985	2026	4	Vietnam, Ho Chi Minh City	National		
Virtus Americas Regional Games	2022	2026	4	Peru, Lima	Regional	Disabled	Intellectual Disability (INAS)
Virtus European Games	2018	2022	4	Poland, Cracow	Regional	Disabled	Intellectual Disability (INAS)
Virtus Global Games	2004	2023	4	France, Vichy	International	Disabled	Formerly known as INAS Global Games. For athletes with intellectual disability or autism
Virtus Oceania Asia Games	2022	2022		Australia, Brisbane	Regional	Disabled	For athletes with intellectual disability, Autism or Down syndrome.
West Asian Games	1997	2025	4	Iraq, Baghdad	Regional		Defunct
West Asian Para Games	2017	2024	2	United Arab Emirates, Sharjah	Regional	Disabled	
West African Games	1977	1979			Regional		Defunct
West African University Games	1965				Regional		
Western Canada Summer Games	1975	2023	4	Canada, Manitoba	National		
Western Asiatic Games	1934	1934			Regional		Defunct
Winter Children of Asia International Sports Games	2019	2027	4		National	Age	
Women's Islamic Games	1993	2005	4		Regional	Gender	Defunct
Women's Olympiad	1921	1931			International	Gender	Defunct
Women's World Games	1922	1934	4		International	Gender	Defunct
World Abilitysport Games	2023	2023		Thailand, Nakhon Ratchasima	International	Disabled	
World Air Games	1997	2025	4		International		
World Artistic Games					International		
World Beach Games	2019	2023	2	Indonesia, Bali	International		
World Bridge Games	2008	2020 (2022 Hold)	2	Italy, Salsomaggiore Terme	International		
World Combat Games	2010	2023	4	Saudi Arabia, Riyadh	International		
World Company Sports Games	2016	2023	2	Mexico, León, Guanajuato	International		
World Cyber Games	2000	2022	1		International		Esports
World Dancesport Games	2013	2013			International		Dancesport
World Deaf Youth Games	2024	2024	2	Brazil, São Paulo	National	Disabled	
World Dwarf Games	1993	2023	4	Germany, Cologne	International	Disabled	
World Electronic Sports Games	2016	2019			International		
World Equestrian Games	1990	2026	4		International		Equestrian events.
World Eskimo Indian Olympics	1961	2023	2	United States, Alaska, Fairbanks	International	Ethnicity	
World e-Sports Games	2004	2010			International		
World Ex-servicemen's Wheelchair Games	1993	1993			International	Disability	
World Firefighters Games	1990	2024	2	Denmark, Aalborg	International	Occupation	
World Friendship Games	2024	2024		Russia, Kazan	International	Political	
World Games	1981	2025	4	China, Chengdu	International		
World Indigenous Games	2015	2017	2		International		
World Lithuanian Sports Games	1978	2022	4		International	Ethnicity	Started in Canada, usually held in Lithuania (Athletes from Lithuania itself debuted only in 3rd Games in 1988).
World Martial Arts Games	2007	2023	2	United States, TBA	International		
World Masters Games	1985	2025	4	Taiwan, Taipei City, New Taipei City	International	Age	
Winter World Masters Games	2010	2024	4	Italy, lombardy	International	Age	
World Medical and Health Games	1978	2023	2	Spain, Madeira	International	Occupation	For health professional
World Mind Sports Games	2008	2012			International		
World Nature Games	1997	1997			International		
World Nomad Games	2014	2024	2	Kazakhstan, Astana	International		
World OutGames	2006	2017	4		International	Sexual orientation	
World Police and Fire Games	1985	2023	2	Canada, Winnipeg	International	Occupation	
World Polonia Games of Summer	1934	2023	2		National		
World Polonia Games of Winter	2010	2022	2	Poland, Wisła	National		
World Roller Games	2017	2022	4	Argentina, Buenos Aires	International		
World Scholar-Athlete Games	1993	2011			International	Occupation	
World Surfing Games	1996	2023	1	El Salvador, Surf City	International		
World Transplant Summer Games	1978	2023	2	Australia, Perth	International		
World Transplant Winter Games	1994	2022	2	Italy, Bormio	International		
World Urban Games	2019	2023	2		International		
World Youth Games	1998	1998			International		
X Games	1995	2022	1	United States, South California	International		
Winter X Games	1997	2023	1	United States, Aspen	International		
Summer X Games Asia	1998	2022		Japan, Chiba City	Regional		
Winter X Games Asia	2020				Regional		
Summer X Games Europe	2013	2019			Regional		
Winter X Games Europe	2010	2020			Regional		
X Games Latin America	2007	2013			Regional		
X Games Oceania	2018	2018			Regional		
Youth Centennial Games	1996	1996			International	Age	
Summer Youth Olympic Games	2010	2026	4	Senegal, Dakar	International	Age	
Winter Youth Olympic Games	2012	2024	4	South Korea, Gangwon	International	Age	
Youth World Games	2023	2023	1	Portugal, Algarve	International	Age	
Zimbabwe National Youth Games	2003	2019			National	Age	
Zimbabwe National Youth And Paralympic Games	2008	2018			National	Age, Disability	

Legend
1. Established – Year in which first edition was held 2. Year in which last edition is held 3. Recurrence (in years) 4. Location where next edition is held 5. Cultural and/or political elements that limit audiences as intended (e.g. ethnicity, religion, gender, occupation)

=== No determined to hold ===
- Asian University Games
- Winter European Para Youth Games
- Winter European Para Championships
- European Para Games
- Olympic Esports Games
- Shanghai Cooperation Organisation (SCO) Games
- European Para Youth Championships
- Asian Youth Winter Para Games
- Asian Winter Para Games

=== Component games ===
Provincial multi-sport events in Canada

- BC Games
- Alberta Games
- Saskatchewan Games
- Manitoba Games
- Ontario Games
- Jeux du Quebec
- East Coast Games of Saint John's

Provincial multi-sport events in Japan

- 群馬県民スポーツ大会
- 全九州高等学校体育大会

Provincial multi-sport events in Argentina

- juegos bonaerenses
- Juegos Deportivos Entrerrianos

Provincial multi-sport events in Chile

- Juegos Juveniles del Norte Grande

==== National Congress of State Games ====
- Alabama: Alabama Sports Festival
- Arizona: Grand Canyon State Games
- California: California State Games
- Colorado: Rocky Mountain State Games
- Connecticut: Nutmeg State Games
- Florida: Sunshine State Games
- Georgia: Georgia Games
- Hawaii: Aloha State Games
- Idaho: Winter Games of Idaho, Summer Games of Idaho
- Illinois: Prairie State Games
- Indiana: State Games of Indiana
- Iowa: Iowa Games
- Kansas: Sunflower State Games
- Kentucky: Bluegrass State Games
- Maine: Maine Games
- Massachusetts: Bay State Games
- Minnesota: Star of the North Games
- Mississippi: State Games of Mississippi
- Missouri: Show-Me State Games
- Montana: Big Sky State Games
- Nebraska: Cornhusker State Games
- New Hampshire: New Hampshire Amateur State Games
- New Jersey: Garden State Games
- New Mexico: New Mexico Games
- New York: Empire State Games
- North Carolina: State Games of North Carolina
- North Dakota: Prairie Rose State Games
- Oklahoma: Sooner State Games
- Oregon: State Games of Oregon
- Pennsylvania: Keystone State Games
- Texas: Games of Texas
- Utah: Utah Summer Games, Utah Winter Games
- Virginia: Coventry Commonwealth Games of Virginia
- Washington: Washington State Games
- Wisconsin: Badger State Games
- Wyoming: Cowboy State Games

State multi-sports events in Malaysia

- Federal Territories: Federal Territories Games (SWIP)
- Johor: Johor Unity Games
- Kedah: Kedah Darul Aman Games (SUKDA)
- Kelantan: Kelantan Games Carnival (Kasukel)
- Perak: Perak Games Carnival (SUPER)
- Sabah: Sabah Games (SAGA)
- Sarawak: Sarawak Games (SUKSAR)
- Selangor: Selangor Games (SUKSES)
- Terengganu: Terengganu Games (SUTERA)

Provincial multi-sport events in China

- Anhui Province Games
- Tibet Autonomous Region Games

Provincial multi-sport events in Great Britain

- London Youth Games

Provincial multi-sport events in Republic of China

- Hsinchu City Games

Provincial multi-sport events in South Korea

- Chungcheongbuk-do: Chungcheongbuk-do Sports Festival, Chungcheongbuk-do Junior Sports Festival
- Chungcheongnam-do: Chungcheongnam-do Sports Festival
- Gangwon-dl: Gangwon-do Sports Festival
- Gyeongsangbuk-do: Gyeongsangbuk-do Sports Festival, Gyeongsangbuk-do Students Sports Festival, Gyeongsangbuk-do Junior Sports Festival
- Gyeonggi-do: Gyeonggi-do Sports Festival
- Gyeongsangnam-do: Gyeongsangnam-do Sports Festival
- Jeollabuk-do: Jeollabuk-do Sports Festival
- Jeollanam-do: lJeollanam-do Sports Festival

National Senior State Games in United States

- Connecticut Masters Games

== See also ==
- International athletics championships and games
- World School Championships
- FISU World University Championships
- Multi-sport event
- Multiple-stage competition (disambiguation)
