= National Games =

National Games may refer to:

- Bangladesh Games
- Canada Games
- Daciad
- Hong Kong Games
- Interior Open Games
- Kingdom Games
- Korean National Sports Festival
- Naadam
- National Games of China
  - National Winter Games of China, national winter games
  - All-China Games, national games for non-Olympic games
  - China National Youth Games, national games for young athletes
  - National Peasants' Games, national games for rural athletes
  - National Red Games, national games of CCP athletes
- National Games of Colombia
- National Games of India
  - Khelo India Winter Games, national winter games
  - Khelo India Beach Games, national beach games
  - Khelo India Para Games, national games for para athletes
  - Khelo India Youth Games, national summer games for young athletes
  - Khelo India University Games, national games for student athletes
- National Games of Nepal
- National Games of Pakistan
- National Games of the People's Republic of China
- National Sports Festival of Japan
- National Sports Week of Indonesia
- Nigerian National Sports Festival
  - National Youth Games in Nigeria, national games for young athletes
- Philippine National Games
  - Philippine National Para Games, national games for para athletes
  - Palarong Pambansa, national games for student athletes
- Singapore Biennial Games
- South African Games
- State Games of America
- Spartakiad of Albania
- Spartakiad of Czechoslovakia
- Spartakiad of the Soviet Union
- Sukma Games
- Thailand National Games
  - Thailand National Youth Games, national games for young athletes
- Tuvalu Games
- Vietnam National Games
