= Tebesa Nemine =

Nigerian swimmer

Personal information
- Nationality: Nigeria
- Born: February 8, 1986 (age 40) Delta, Nigeria
- Height: 1.85 m (6 ft 1 in)

Sport
- Sport: Swimming
- Strokes: Freestyle, backstroke, butterfly

Tebesa Nemine (born 8 February 1986 in Delta State, Nigeria) is a competitive swimmer from Nigeria and an aspiring Olympian. He is best known for winning 12 gold medals and one silver medal at the KADA 2009 Nigerian National Sports Festival in Kaduna.

Nemine hails from the Burutu Local Government area in Delta State. He is the first of six children. He started swimming at age 13 and was spotted by the then Delta State Swim Coach Monday Aigbe, after winning a swimming competition in the river. Aigbe took him to a pool and began coaching him to become an elite swimmer.

Nemine said he was inspired by Michael Phelps after he set out to win 8 gold medals and achieved his target. Nemine felt he could do the same.

Due to his record setting performance at the Sports Festival, He was awarded 6 million naira ($39,000) by the Delta State Governor Emmanuel Uduaghan; 500,000 naira ($3250) for every gold medal won. He has been awarded a scholarship to study and train in a Swim Academy in Australia as preparation for the 2012 Summer Olympics and was named the Delta State ambassador for youths in the riverine area.

Nemine credits his family's swimming lineage (his cousin Blessing Forcados has represented Nigeria at various international meets), his hard working father and the Delta State government for his achievement (the state funded his training in France as preparation for the Festival).
