= NDFA =

NDFA may refer to:

- National Drama Festivals Association
- Nondeterministic finite automaton (also abbreviated as NFA)
- North Dakota Fencing Association
- North Dakota Firefighter's Association
