= North Dakota Fencing Association =

The North Dakota Fencing Association was established in 2011 by a group of North Dakota fencing coaches who wanted to help fencing grow in North Dakota. North Dakota fencers had been meeting up once a year at the North Dakota Prairie Rose State Games held in July. However, 2011 was the last year, after 25 years, the state games were held.

The NDFA also produces a quarterly news letter titled 'North Dakota Fencing Association Forte' The first issue can be read online here: NDFA Forte Issue 1

Currently NDFA tries to hold four Non-USFA fencing tournaments a year for North Dakota fencers of all levels to attend.
