= Starty nadezhd =

Multi-sport event

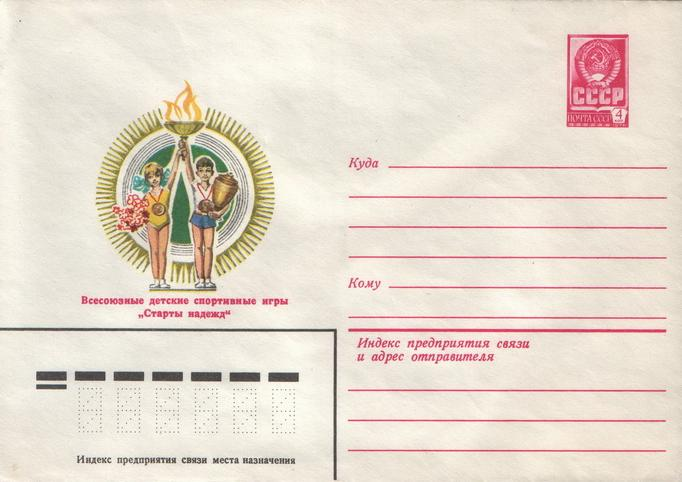
USSR stamped cover dedicated to the competition, released on July 20, 1981

Starty nadezhd (Russian: Старты надежд) was the national children's multi-sport event in the USSR. Established in 1975, the competition was held between grades of all secondary schools throughout the country. Motto of the competition was "Olympians Are Among Us!" (Russian: Олимпийцы среди нас!).

== Description ==
=== Soviet secondary school system ===
To describe competition format, first the structure of a Soviet secondary school should be overviewed. Typically about 1,000 children studied in one Soviet secondary school. Levels of education comprised 10 classes from the first to the tenth. And each class was divided into several parallel classes. They were numbered like 9 "A", 9 "B", 9 "V" and so on for parallel classes of the ninth class in this case. Usually a parallel class was also called just class. So, in one parallel class, like 9 "A" for instance, some 30 to 40 children of the same age studied together, while 9 "B" was a separate group of children, that had lessons in another time and place, although it had the same education program. Children of 10 "A" parallel class were one year older than children of 9 "A", and the education program was more advanced for them than it was for 9 "A", while children of 8 "A" were one year younger and had less advanced education program, than 9 "A".

=== Competition format ===
"Starty nadezhd" was a competition for children of classes 4th to 9th. A parallel class, like 4 "A" for instance, as one team competed in several sports with other parallel classes of the same school, like 4 "B", 4 "V". So, on the first level of the competition six best parallel classes for each secondary school of the country were determined, let's say 4 "B", 5 "A", 6 "V", 7 "A", 8 "B", 9 "A". Then, on the second level of the competition each of these parallel classes competed with corresponding best parallel classes of other secondary schools of the same district or town. Third level competition was held between best parallel classes of districts of the same oblast. The fourth level was contested between best parallel classes of oblasts of the same krai. The fifth level of the competition was held between best parallel classes of krais of the same republic. And the best parallel classes of 15 republics, i.e. 6 times 15 — about 100 teams in total, competed in the finals to determine the best parallel classes of the country.

=== Sports ===
On first four levels of the "Starty nadezhd" competition classes competed in the following sports:

- athletics: running, cross-country running, push-ups, pull-ups, ball throw
- gymnastics: floor exercise
- swimming
- shooting
- tourist relay, also called tourist obstacle course

On the fifth level, the last one before the finals, in addition to these sports, children teams competed in cross-country skiing, ice hockey, football, volleyball, basketball, chess, checkers.

=== Finals ===
In the finals of the competition competed some 100 best parallel classes of 15 republics of the Soviet Union. For the first time the finals were held in Artek Young Pioneer camp in October 1976. Next four finals also were held in Artek each year in September–October until 1980. Finals sixth through ninth were held until 1987 in Orlyonok Young Pioneer camp; 1981, 1984 and 1986 were leap years. Honorary guests of "Starty nadezhd" finals were many notable Soviet athletes, Olympic champions, including Nikolai Andrianov, Valeriy Borzov, Galina Prozumenshchikova, Pyotr Bolotnikov, Elena Vaytsekhovskaya.

Winners of the finals of the competition were awarded medals, diplomas, pennants, memorable prizes.

== Significance ==
As every school age boy and girl of the then-Soviet Union of classes 4 to 9 of secondary school could take part in "Starty nadezhd", competing in one's parallel class, the competition served as great means of popularizing sports among people, and exposing them to practicing sports, competitive activity and team spirit.

Both the idea and the name of the competition are still popular. Some competitions named "Starty nadezhd" are held in Russia and Belarus. Since 1998 "Starty nadezhd" is the name of All-Ukrainian competition of parallel classes of secondary schools which is held yearly (with some leap years, nine finals were held before 2010), with finals in Artek, where some 27 best parallel classes compete.
