= Pan-Armenian Games =

Multi-sport event, held between competitors from the Armenian diaspora and Armenia

Pan Armenian Games Համահայկական խաղեր
- Flag of the Pan-Armenian Games
- Purpose: Multi-sport event for Armenian diaspora and Armenia.
- Frequency: Every four years (formerly two years)
- Inaugurated: 1999; Yerevan
- Most recent: 2023
- Chairman of the World Committee: Ishkhan Zakaryan
- Headquarters: Yerevan
- Website: panarmeniangames.am

The Pan-Armenian Games (Armenian: Համահայկական խաղեր, romanized: Hamahaykakan khagher) are a multi-sport event, held between competitors from the Armenian diaspora and Armenia. They consist of various competitions in individual and team sports among the Armenian athletes. It takes place in Yerevan, the capital of Armenia.

== Eligibility ==
The games are open to Armenian passport-holders (irrespective of national origin) and citizens of other countries who have Armenian descent. Spouses of those of Armenian descent are also eligible to compete.

== History ==
The idea of holding Pan-Armenian Games came from Soviet diplomat Ashot Melik-Shahnazaryan, who first thought of the idea of organizing universal games for all Armenians while he was on a business trip in 1965 to Brazzaville, Republic of Congo, that was getting ready to participate in the first Pan-African Games. But because Armenia was a Soviet republic and that such an idea was considered by Moscow to be nationalistic, Shahnazaryan had to wait until Armenia attained independence to try to put forth his brainchild.

In 1995, Melik-Shahnazaryan for the first time publicly announced his intentions to create the Pan-Armenians Games while he was in Paris as a guest for World Games of AGBU. He quickly gained the support of the Armenian diaspora with whom he did not have any contact during Soviet times. The idea of organizing sporting events for all Armenians and the motto of the future World Committee "Unity through Sport" was highly supported by representatives of Homenetmen, AGBU and Homenmen in diasporan cities such as Los Angeles, Toronto, Montreal, Buenos Aires, Beirut, Paris, London and many others.

During the founding meeting on 30 April 1997, in Yerevan, World Committee of Pan-Armenian Games (WCPAG) was created, with the help of traditional Armenian unions of the Diaspora and the Iranian-Armenian cultural-sport organization "Ararat". Representatives of state and public organizations of Armenia, Artsakh and also Armenian communities from Iran, Argentina, Turkey, Australia, Germany, Canada, Cyprus, France and other countries became members. Ashot Melik-Shahnazaryan was elected the first president of WCPAG. He also became the creator of the emblem, cup, medals, almost all the symbols of the organization and also the official anthem and the farewell song of the games.

Today, the WCPAG is a non-governmental, international organization that collaborates with the International Olympic Committee (IOC), UNESCO, the Council of Europe and other international sport units and contributes in developing sport in Armenia.

== The Games ==
The Pan-Armenian Games are complex competitions in individual and team kinds of sport among athletes of Armenia and athletes of Armenian origin from other countries. The athletes from various parts of the world represent the cities in which they come from and not countries like other pan-games. The Pan-Armenian Games take place mainly in Yerevan, Armenia. The sports played during the games are football, mini-football, basketball, volleyball, swimming, badminton, tennis, table tennis, chess, and athletics.

The first Pan-Armenian Games took place from 28 August 1999 to 5 September 1999. Delegations from 62 cities and 23 countries participated in the games.

In 2003, it was decided to transform the games into once every four years (instead of once every two years).

The Games are mostly held in Yerevan, Armenia. However, the opening ceremony of the 7th Pan-Armenian Games was hosted for the first time in Stepanakert, the capital of the Republic of Artsakh in August 2019.

The opening ceremony of the 8th Pan-Armenian Games in August 2023 were held at the Shirak Stadium in the city of Gyumri.

	Year	Date	Sports	Athletes	Cities (Countries)
I	1999	28 August–5 September	7	1141	63 (23)
II	2001	18–26 August	9	1419	82 (27)
III	2003	16–24 August	10	1559	82 (28)
IV	2007	18–26 August	10	1576	94 (28)
V	2011	13–21 August	10	3244	125 (33)
VI	2015	2–13 August	17	6352	175 (35)
VII	2019	6–17 August	17	5300	161 (35)
VIII	2023	5–19 August	17	7161	179 (41)
IX	2027	TBD	TBD	TBD	TBD

== Sports ==
=== Summer ===
1. 1999: 1141 athletes - 63 cities (529 from Armenia, 612 from the Diaspora). 7 sports: Football, basketball, volleyball, tennis, table-tennis, chess, and athletics.
2. 2001: 1419 athletes - 82 cities (464 from Armenia, 955 from the Diaspora). 9 sports: Football, basketball, volleyball, tennis, table- tennis, chess, athletics, swimming, and mini-football.
3. 2003: 1559 athletes - 82 cities (423 from Armenia, 1136 from the Diaspora). 10 sports: Football, basketball, volleyball, tennis, table-tennis, chess, athletics, swimming, mini-football, and badminton.
4. 2007: 1576 athletes - 28 cities (425 from Armenia, 1151 from the Diaspora). 10 sports: Football, basketball, volleyball, tennis, table-tennis, chess, athletics, swimming, mini-football, and badminton.
5. 2011: 3244 athletes - 125 cities (1372 from Armenia, 1872 from the Diaspora). 10 sports: Football, basketball, volleyball, tennis, table-tennis, chess, athletics, swimming, mini-football and badminton.
6. 2015: 6,352 athletes - 175 cities. 17 sports: Football, basketball, volleyball, tennis, table- tennis, chess, athletics, swimming, mini-football, badminton, beach-volleyball, sports dances, golf, handball, wrestling, cycling, and shooting.
7. 2023: 107 medals in 17 sports.

=== Winter Games ===
1. 2014: 401 athletes - 22 cities (193 from Armenia, 208 from the Diaspora). 4 sports: Alpine skiing, skiing, snowboarding, and ice hockey.

== Participating nations ==
Delegations are represented by country of residence, and participants from the same country march together during the opening ceremonies. Delegations from countries which have participated in the games have come from the following:

- Armenia
- Argentina
- Australia
- Austria
- Brazil
- Bulgaria
- Canada
- Chile
- Cyprus
- Czechia
- Egypt
- Estonia
- France
- Georgia
- Germany
- Great Britain
- Greece
- India
- Iran
- Iraq
- Israel
- Italy
- Jordan
- Kazakhstan
- Kuwait
- Lebanon
- Netherlands
- Poland
- Russia
- Saudi Arabia
- Singapore
- Spain
- Sweden
- Syria
- Turkey
- UAE
- Ukraine
- USA

== The medals won by cities (Top 5) ==
The medals won by cities

City	Gold	Silver	Bronze	Total
(Armenia) Yerevan	51	42	47	140
(Armenia) Gyumri	15	12	19	46
(Armenia) Vanadzor	6	8	4	18
(Republic of Artsakh) Stepanakert	5	4	6	15
(Georgia (country)) Tbilisi	4	2	2	8
Total	114	113	114	341

== See also ==
- Armenia at the Olympics
- Armenian Olympic Committee
- List of multi-sport events
- Sport in Armenia
