= Big Sky State Games =

Multi-sport event in Montana, United States

The Big Sky State Games are the State games for the U.S. State of Montana. The BSSG is an affiliate of the State Games of America. It is a sporting event for young athletes to come together and play over 30 sports.

The games are held in Billings. The games were inaugurated in 1986.

== Sports ==
- Archery
- Arm wrestling
- Axe Throwing
- Badminton
- Basketball
- Biathlon
- Billiards
- Bowling
- Canoeing/Kayaking
- Cycling
- Dance events (stage)
- Dancing (Ballroom)
- Disc golf
- Electronic darts
- Equestrian
- Fencing
- Figure skating
- Fitness walk
- Flag football
- Golf
- Handball
- Ice hockey (3-on-3)
- Karate
- Pickleball
- Racquetball
- Road running
- Shooting
- Soccer
- Softball
- Summer biathlon
- Table tennis
- Taekwondo/Judo
- Tennis
- Track and field
- Triathlon
- Volleyball
- Wrestling
- Weightlifting
