= 1913 Nordic Games =

International multi-sport event

- Host city: Stockholm, Östersund
- Country: Sweden

The 1913 Nordic Games was the fifth Nordic Games and was held in Stockholm in February 1913. It was formally international sports competitions in many disciplines, but because of the communications of the time it was still mostly domestic sportspeople participating.

Among the sports were winter sports like bandy, speed skating and skiing but also motorsports and equestrian sports.

== Bandy ==
The bandy tournament was a club tournament. Beside the Swedish teams, IFK Helsingfors from Finland also participated. Leipziger HC from Germany was scheduled to appear but the Germans eventually favoured to take part in the 1913 European Bandy Championships, which were held in Switzerland at the same time. The Stockholm team AIK beat IFK Uppsala in the final game by 3-1.

== Cross-country skiing ==
The winter of 1913 had left Stockholm little snow, so this year the cross-country skiing was arranged in Östersund. Beside Swedish skiers, there were competitors from Finland, Norway and Russia. The events were 30, 60 and 90 kilometers for men, and for women 10 kilometer. 90 km was the most prestigious event and this was won by Swede Haldo Hansson.

== Media ==
The games were depicted in the film Nordiska spelen 1913 by cinematographer Adrian Bjurman, a film shown in several cinemas in Sweden in the same year.
