= Baltic Sea Games =

Multi-sport event between countries near the Baltic Sea

The Baltic Sea Games was a multi-sport event between countries near the Baltic Sea. It was held on two occasions: first in 1993 then for a final time in 1997.

Estonian officials drove the creation of competition, organising a preliminary meeting with other nations in 1988. An agreement was reached at the inaugural Sports Conference of the Baltic Sea Countries in 1989 that Tallinn would host the first games, with the intention of the competition being to use sport to promote understanding and friendship among young people. Despite the break-up of the Soviet Union in this period, ten nations of the Baltic region signed on for the first games in 1993, comprising the three post-Soviet Baltic states (Estonia, Latvia, Lithuania), the three Nordic countries (Denmark, Norway, Sweden), plus Germany, Finland, Poland and Russia.

At the 1993 Baltic Sea Games, a total of 1177 athletes took part in the competition where 170 gold medals were awarded. Lithuania topped the medal table with 39 gold medals among a haul of 95, closely followed by Russia on 38 golds and 90 medals. Poland had the next most gold medals, with 23, while the hosts Estonia had the next highest medal tally, with 81.

The 1997 Baltic Sea Games followed on schedule, with the Lithuanian capital Vilnius serving as host. The competition was greatly expanded, with 2250 athletes present and 221 gold medals given out. Only volleyball was dropped from the sports programme, while ten new discrete sports added. All the original nations returned and Belarus competed for the first (and only) time. The hosts Lithuania repeated as medal table winners, with 62 gold medals and 178 medals in total. Newcomers Belarus had the next highest gold medal count on 58 and Russia had the second highest medal total with 129. Poland also performed well, with the fourth best tally in both gold medals and overall.

The Latvian capital Riga intended to host the 2001 edition of the games, but it was abandoned due to lack of support among the competing nations.

== Editions ==
Games	Year	Host city	Host country	Dates	Sports	Nations	Athletes
1	1993	Tallinn	Estonia	22 June – 3 July	14	10	1177
2	1997	Vilnius	Lithuania	25 June – 6 July	23	11	2550
3	2001	Riga	Latvia	Abandoned			

=== Baltic Sea Youth Games ===
Games	Year	Host city	Host country	Dates	Sports	Nations	Athletes
1	1999	Schwerin	Germany				
2	2001	Rostock	Germany				
3	2003	Šiauliai	Lithuania				
4	2005	Szczecin	Poland				
5	2007	Neubrandenburg	Germany				
6	2009	Koszalin	Poland				
7	2011	Ljungbyhed	Sweden				
8	2013	Vyborg	Russia				
9	2015	Brandenburg	Germany				
10	2017	Brest	Belarus				
11	2019	Karlstad	Sweden				

== Participation ==
- Belarus (1997 only)
- Denmark
- Estonia
- Finland
- Germany
- Latvia
- Lithuania
- Norway
- Poland
- Russia
- Sweden

== Sports ==
- Athletics
- Badminton (1997 only)
- Basketball
- Boxing (1997 only)
- Canoeing
- Cycling
  - Track cycling
  - Road cycling
- Darts (1997 only)
- Dancesport
- Fencing
- Gymnastics
- Handball
- Ice hockey (1997 only)
- Judo
- Modern pentathlon (1997 only)
- Orienteering
- Rowing (1997 only)
- Rugby union (1997 only)
- Sambo (1997 only)
- Shooting
- Swimming
- Weightlifting (1997 only)
- Wrestling
  - Freestyle wrestling (1997 only)
  - Greco-Roman wrestling
- Volleyball (1993 only)
- Yachting (1997 only)

== Medal table ==
Rank	Nation	Gold	Silver	Bronze	Total
1	Lithuania (LTU)	101	94	78	273
2	Russia (RUS)	81	72	66	219
3	Belarus (BLR)	58	37	27	122
4	Poland (POL)	53	29	44	126
5	Latvia (LAT)	26	42	66	134
6	Estonia (EST)	22	46	58	126
7	Germany (GER)	18	23	12	53
8	Finland (FIN)	17	22	33	72
9	Sweden (SWE)	14	19	24	57
10	Norway (NOR)	1	2	0	3
11	Denmark (DEN)	0	1	0	1
Totals (11 entries)		391	387	408	1,186

== Athletics gold medalists ==
=== Men's 100 metres ===
- 1993: Aleksey Knoroz (RUS)
- 1997: Piotr Berestiuk (POL)

=== Men's 200 metres ===
- 1993: Innokenty Zharov (RUS)
- 1997: Anders Hansson (SWE)

=== Men's 400 metres ===
- 1993: Innokenty Zharov (RUS)
- 1997: Dmitriy Bugayev (RUS)

=== Men's 800 metres ===
- 1993: Rolandas Vasiliauskas (LTU)
- 1997: Ivan Komar (BLR)

=== Men's 1500 metres ===
- 1993: Andrey Machonko (RUS)
- 1997: Darius Gruzdys (LTU)

=== Men's 5000 metres ===
- 1993: Pavel Andreyev (RUS)
- 1997: Sergey Dubina (BLR)

=== Men's 10,000 metres ===
- 1993: Česlovas Kundrotas (LTU)

=== Men's 3000 metres steeplechase ===
- 1993: Girts Fogels (LAT)
- 1997: Aleksey Rudenko (RUS)

=== Men's 110 metres hurdles ===
- 1993: Igors Kazanovs (LAT)
- 1997: Dmitriy Sereda (BLR)

=== Men's 400 metres hurdles ===
- 1993: Igor Frolov (RUS)
- 1997: Andrzej Ogorek (POL)

=== Men's high jump ===
- 1993: Rolandas Verkys (LTU)
- 1997: Aleksandr Buglakov (BLR)

=== Men's pole vault ===
- 1993: Valeri Bukrejev (EST)

=== Men's long jump ===
- 1993: Vladen Kapustyanskiy (RUS)
- 1997: Tomas Bardauskas (LTU)

=== Men's triple jump ===
- 1993: Audrius Raizgys (LTU)
- 1997: Audrius Raizgys (LTU)

=== Men's shot put ===
- 1993: Vitalijus Mitkus (LTU)
- 1997: Saulius Kleiza (LTU)

=== Men's discus throw ===
- 1993: Aleksandr Borichevskiy (RUS)
- 1997: Vaclavas Kidykas (LTU)

=== Men's hammer throw ===
- 1993: Benjaminas Viluckis (LTU)
- 1997: Vitaliy Alisevich (BLR)

=== Men's javelin throw ===
- 1993: Dainis Kûla (LAT)
- 1997: Kestutis Celiesius (LTU)

=== Men's 4 × 100 metres relay ===
- 1993: Russia (RUS)

=== Men's 4 × 400 metres relay ===
- 1993: Latvia (LAT)
- 1997: Poland (POL)

=== Women's 100 metres ===
- 1993: Marja Salmela (FIN)
- 1997: Agné Visockaité (LTU)

=== Women's 200 metres ===
- 1993: Marja Salmela (FIN)
- 1997: Agné Visockaité (LTU)

=== Women's 400 metres ===
- 1993: Yuliya Tarasenko (RUS)
- 1997: Žana Minina (LTU)

=== Women's 800 metres ===
- 1993: Tatyana Semskova (RUS)
- 1997: Olga Novozenina (RUS)

=== Women's 1500 metres ===
- 1993: Stefanija Statkuvienė (LTU)
- 1997: Rasa Drazdauskaitė (LTU)

=== Women's 3000 metres ===
- 1993: Stefanija Statkuvienė (LTU)

=== Women's 5000 metres ===
- 1997: Vilija Birbalaité (LTU)

=== Women's 100 metres hurdles ===
- 1993: Neringa Jakštiené (LTU)
- 1997: Remigija Nazarovienė (LTU)

=== Women's 400 metres hurdles ===
- 1993: Olga Nazarova (RUS)
- 1997: Elena Kostickaja (LTU)

=== Women's high jump ===
- 1993: Yelena Topchina (RUS)
- 1997: Svetlana Lapina (RUS)

=== Women's long jump ===
- 1993: Virge Naeris (EST)
- 1997: Joanna Kosciely (POL)

=== Women's triple jump ===
- 1993: Inâra Curko (LAT)
- 1997: Yelena Stakhova (BLR)

=== Women's shot put ===
- 1993: Monika Raizgiené (LTU)
- 1997: Linda-Marie Mårtensson (SWE)

=== Women's discus throw ===
- 1993: Austra Mikelyté (LTU)
- 1997: Joanna Wiśniewska (POL)

=== Women's javelin throw ===
- 1993: Lyudmila Konon (RUS)
- 1997: Rita Ramanauskaité (LTU)

=== Women's 4 × 100 metres relay ===
- 1993: Latvia (LAT)

== See also ==
- SELL Student Games
