= Bundesjugendspiele =

German annual student sports event

The Bundesjugendspiele (German pronunciation) ("Federal Youth Games") are an annual sports event that takes place at German schools and German international schools. They are obligatory for all students.

The participating students are expected to achieve the best possible performances in specific disciplines, like athletics or gymnastics. In athletics, usually a combination consisting of the disciplines ball-throwing (shot put in higher age groups), running, and long jump is performed.

The performances achieved are rated with points. If the participant achieves a specific minimum score, they are given a simple certificate. Above a certain higher score they receive an 'honorary certificate', which bear the (printed) signature of the Federal President. Since 1991, all other students, who have neither received a 'certificate of achievement' nor an 'honorary certificate', get a 'certificate of participation'.

== History ==
The Bundesjugendspiele were inspired by the sports official and sports scientist Carl Diem, who also initiated the German Sports Badge and the Olympic torch relay, and founded the German Sport University Cologne. At the same time he engaged in propaganda actions during the time of Nazi Germany and used sports for National Socialist actions. The precursor of the Bundesjugendspiele were the Reichsjugendwettkämpfe, which took place for the first time in 1920.

'Winner's Certificate' from the Bundesjugendspiele 1986

The event was first announced by the Federal Ministry of the Interior, then by the Federal Ministry for Youth, Family, and Health of Students between 8 and 19 years. Since 2001 there are nine Bundesjugendspiele that are advertised as individual competitions in apparatus gymnastics, athletics and swimming.

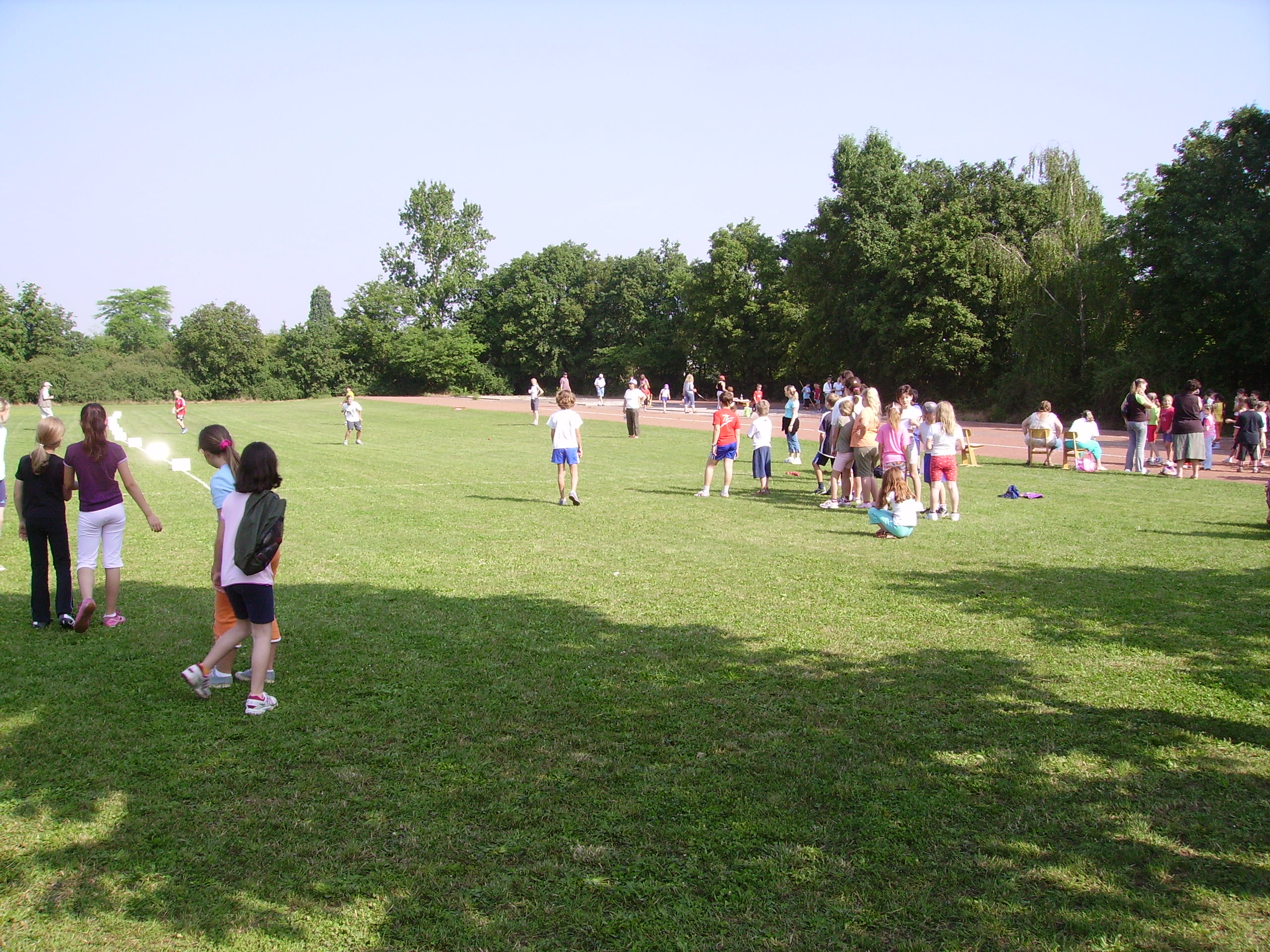
Bundesjugendspiele (2007)

The National Paralympic Committee Germany and the Deutsche Behindertensportjugend have, in collaboration with the committee for the Bundesjugendspiele and the commission of sports in the KMK, developed a programme for the participation of students with disabilities.

== Debate ==
In July 2015 a petition was started on change.org with the aim of abolishing the Bundesjugendspiele. Within a few days several thousand signatures were collected in favor of the abolition. Reports about this petition triggered a debate about the Bundesjugendspiele. In July 2015 another petition was started on change.org with the aim of maintaining the Bundesjugendspiele. This petition also gained several thousand supporters in a short time.

The proponents of the Bundesjugendspiele argue that the basic movements involved in athletics belong to something that was earlier called the classical canon of education. Exercise is said to be crucial for the development of cognitive abilities and the aspect of performance comparison is an inherent side effect of sports. Furthermore, the fact that others are better in some areas is said to be an important experience. They argue that dealing with failure is also an important part of learning. Not least, especially within the scope of school education, there is a comparison of individual performance through grading in other subjects, too.

Critics of the Bundesjugendspiele point out that through a confirmation of bad performance in written form physically weaker students are demotivated rather than motivated to do sports. The point of the sports is not the competitive character but the physical fitness paired with shared joy.

People criticize the obligatory participation, because in other branches like reading or singing there are no obligatory competitions. With this obligation physically weaker students are put under compulsion and pressure. Moreover, there is no basis for the distinction between the genders just before puberty, because no fundamental differences in performance are present. Beyond that, individual physical requirements are not considered.
