= Multiple-stage competition =

Multiple-stage competition may refer to:

- Combination events, e.g. decathlon, where points are awarded for each discipline and aggregated to determine the overall winner
- Multisport race, e.g. triathlon, where competitors switch from one method of locomotion to another at different stages of the race
- Multi-stage tournament, where top competitors from one stage progress to the next
- Race stage, where times of difference stages are aggregated
