= Daegu–Gyeongbuk =

Region in South Korea

- Metropolitan area
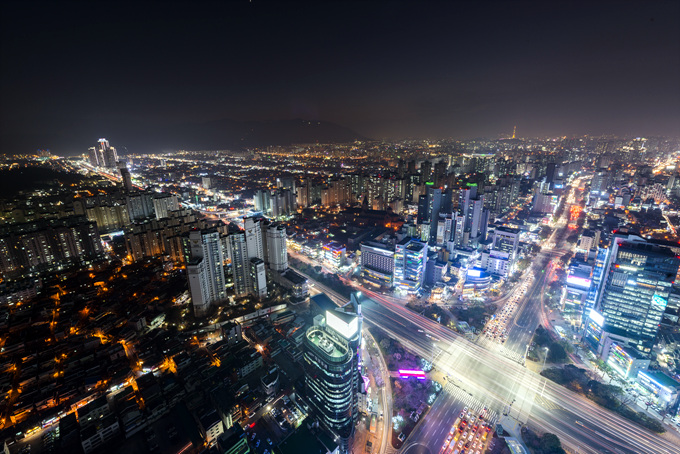
- Downtown Daegu
- Country: South Korea
- Major Cities: Daegu; Pohang; Gumi; Gyeongsan; Gyeongju

Area
  - Metro: 20,530 km^{2} (7,930 sq mi)

Population
  - Metro: 5,000,000
  - Metro density: 240/km^{2} (630/sq mi)

GDP
  - Metro: KR₩ 200 trillion US$ 160 billion (2022)

Daegu-Gyeongbuk or Taegu-Kyŏngbuk (대구경북, 大邱慶北) is the compound word of Daegu and Gyeongbuk (formally Gyeongsangbuk-do), and indicates both administrative regions in South Korea. The region usually forms the similar political, economic, and cultural area. Daegu is an independent city from Gyeongsangbuk-do and has the same administrative status with its mother province. Both have their separate local governments reporting directly to the national government.

In addition to the foremost city Daegu, there are many cities in this region including Pohang the major port and steel industrial city, Gumi the electronics industrial city, Gyeongju and Andong as the historic cities.

With a population of 5.1 million, the region has about one tenth of South Korea's population and GDP. It also has the country's third largest metropolitan area centering the Daegu city.

== Economy ==
Subdivision	Area km^{2}	Population	GDP (KR₩, 2023)	GDP (US$, 2023)
Daegu	1,500	2,365,523	₩ 73 trillion	US$ 58 billion
North Gyeongsang Province	19,030	2,644,757	₩ 127 trillion	US$ 102 billion
Daegu-Gyeongbuk	20,530	5,000,280	₩ 200 trillion	US$ 160 billion

== History ==
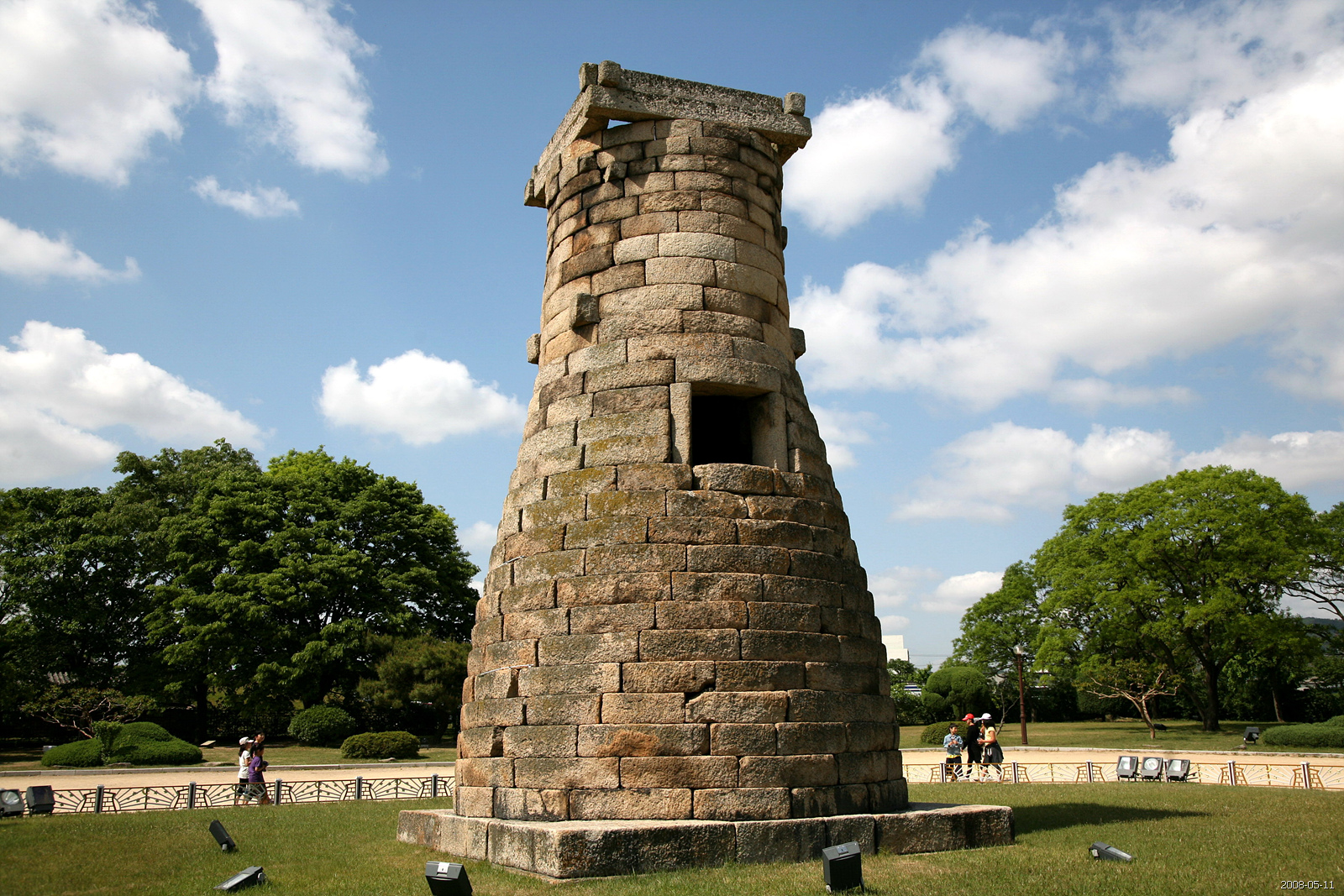
Cheomseongdae in Gyeongju

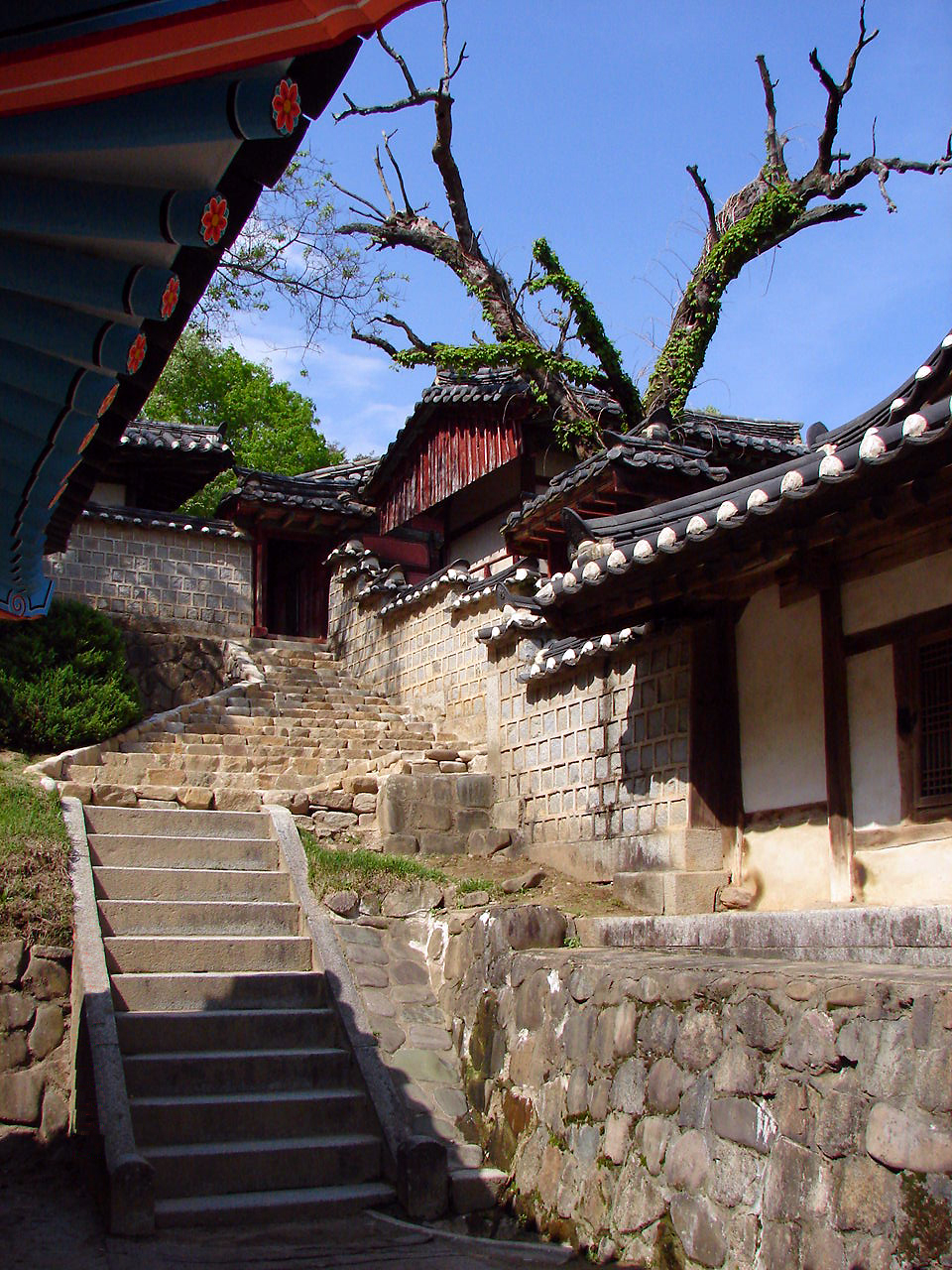
Dosan Seowon in Andong

Historically, the region was the birthplace of the Silla Kingdom. With Gyeongju as the capital, it first unified the Korean Peninsula and prospered for about thousand years. It left a number of remains around the city, which are listed as a World Heritage Site by UNESCO.

In the Goryeo and Joseon Dynasty, it formed the northern half of Gyeongsang-do. Its name is from Gyeong of Gyeongju and Sang of Sangju, the two largest cities at that time. In the latter part of Joseon, it became home to the Korean Confucianism. Many cultural assets can be seen throughout the region including Andong. The Hahoe village of Andong and Yangdong village of Gyeongju are designated as the World heritages. From around the time, Daegu became the commercial center of the region. The provincial capital moved to Daegu in 1601.

The current boundary of the region was first defined with the name of Gyeongsangbuk-do in 1896, the year when Gyeongsang-do was divided into Gyeongsangbuk-do and Gyeongsangnam-do. After more than four hundred years at Daegu, Gyeongsangbuk-do's provincial office moved to Andong in 2016.
