= Prairie Rose State Games =

Multi-sport event in North Dakota, United States

The Prairie Rose State Games was a multi-sport event for athletes from the U.S. State of North Dakota. It was part of the State Games of America. The first games were held in Bismarck, North Dakota in 1987, and the last games were held in July 2011.. Participation peaked at 7,252 athletes in 1999, but fell sharply over the following decade, dropping to 6,387 in 2000 and continuing a steady decline to roughly 3,700 athletes by 2010. The board of directors cited rising sponsorship costs and growing competition from similar events in neighboring states as primary factors behind the decline, noting that businesses approached for sponsorship were often the same ones repeatedly solicited for other local events. The Prairie Rose State Games had also not been a member of the national State Games of America organization for roughly four years prior to its closure. The 25th and final edition, held in Bismarck-Mandan in July 2011 despite regional flooding that required relocating some events, drew about 1,000 athletes to its opening weekend events. Board President Robert King described the games as "a labor of love" but said the financial burden had become unsustainable, and the board of directors dissolved following the final event.

== Sports (as of 2006) ==
- Archery
- Baseball
- Basketball (Traditional)
- Basketball (Shooting contest)
- BMX
- Bowling
- Canoe/Kayak
- Cowboy Action Shooting
- Curling
- Dancing
- Darts
- Disc Golf
- Dodgeball
- Drill Team
- Eightball Pool
- Fishing
- Fencing
- Golf
- High Powered Rifle
- Horseshoes
- Horse show (English & Western)
- In-line Skating
- Kite Flying
- Mountain Biking
- Racewalk
- Racquetball
- Recreational Bike Ride
- Remote Control Aircraft
- Rifle Silhouette
- Road Cycling
- Roadrace
- Rugby
- Skateboarding
- Skate Jam
- Skeet Shooting
- Soccer
- Softball
- Swimming/Diving
- Tennis
- Track & Field (Athletics)
- Trap Shooting
- Triathlon
- Volksmarch
- Volleyball
- Wrestling
