= International Winter Sports Week =

Multiple sports event spanning consecutive days

An International Winter Sports Week is a multi-sport event of winter sports with a program spanning consecutive days longer than a weekend which includes participants from multiple nations.

== France ==
The International Winter Sports Week (French: Semaine Internationale des Sports d'Hiver with Concours International de Ski) organized by the Club Alpin Français (CAF) Winter Sports Commission was a winter multi-sport event held annually from 1907 to 1929 in France. Events included ice hockey, ice skating, skiing, bobsleigh and luge, and had a weekly attendance in the thousands.

=== Sites ===
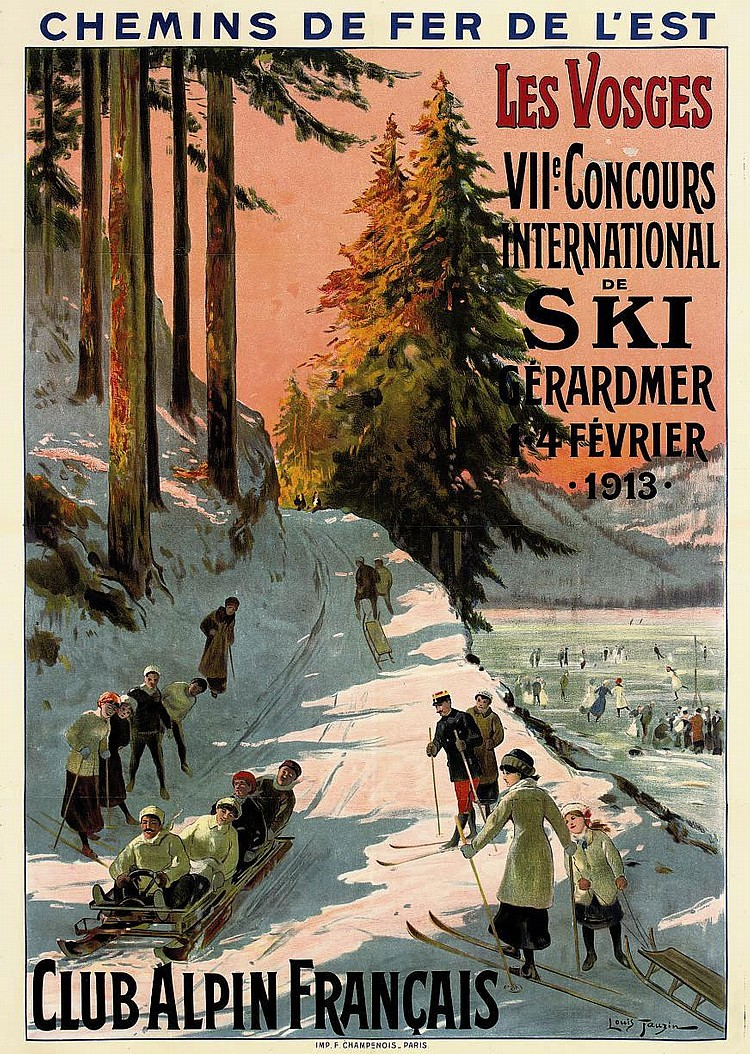
1913 Gérardmer event poster

- 1907. Briançon-Montgenèvre, Feb 9–13
- 1908. Chamonix-Mont-Blanc, Jan 3–5
- 1909. Morez, Jan 31–Feb 5
- 1910. Cauterets, Jan 21–27
- 1911. Le Lioran, Feb 10–15
- 1912. Chamonix-Mont-Blanc, Feb 2–7
- 1913. Gérardmer, Feb 1–4
- 1914 – 1919 Not held
- 1920. Chamonix-Mont-Blanc, Feb 15–17
- 1921. Chamonix-Mont-Blanc, Feb 2–6
- 1922. Morez
- 1923. Luchon-Superbagnères, Feb 1–5
- 1924. Briançon-Montgenèvre, Jan
- 1925. Le Revard (cancelled)
- 1926. Pontarlier, Jan 27–31
- 1927. Chamonix-Mont-Blanc, Feb 9–13
- 1928. Chamonix-Mont-Blanc (cancelled)
- 1929. Luchon-Superbagnères

== Germany ==
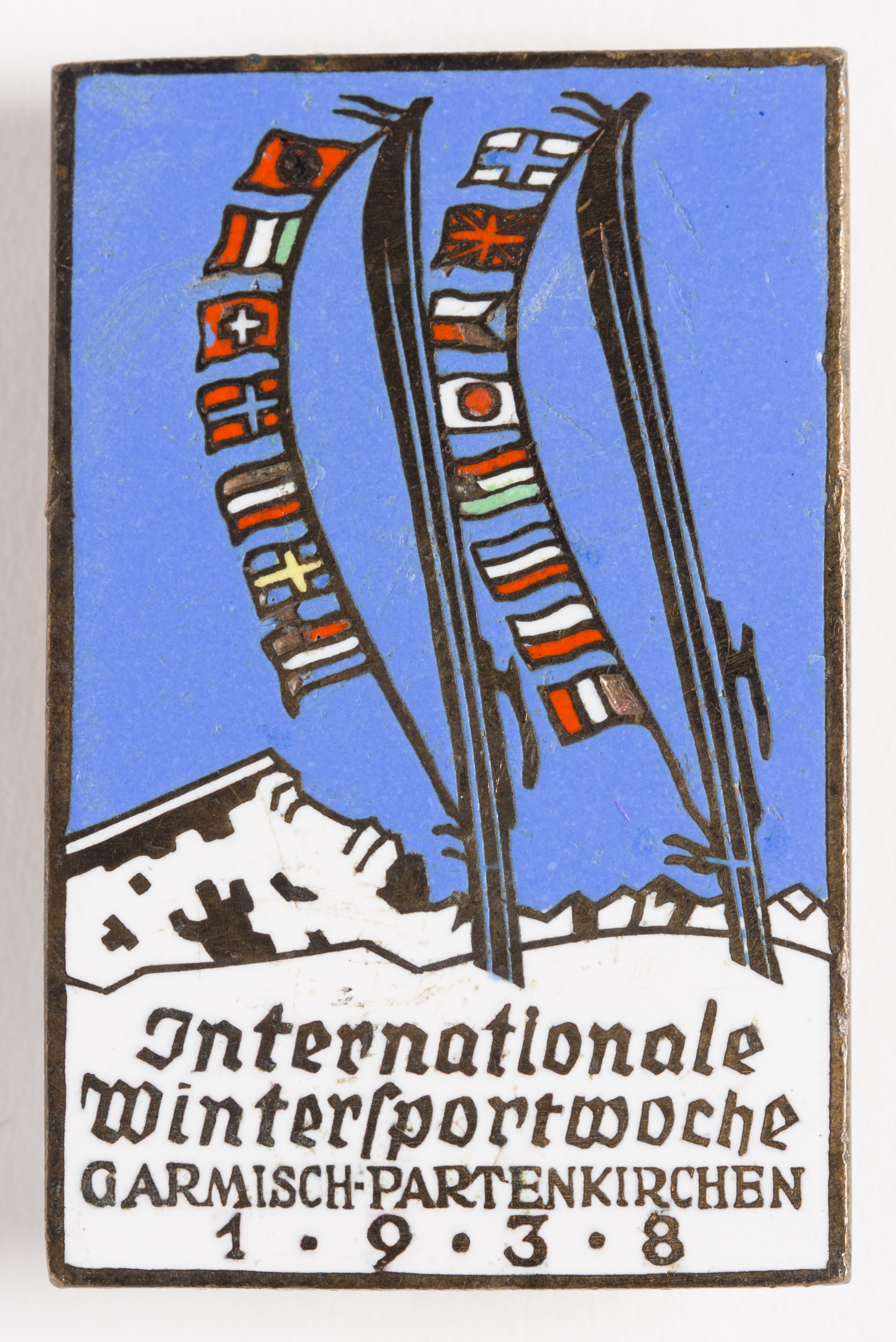
1938 Internationale Wintersportwoche event badge

Garmisch-Partenkirchen holds an annual International Winter Sports Week (German: Internationale Wintersportwoche). Five editions were held from 1937 to 1941 then resumed in 1950.

== Other ==
In 1971 Sapporo, Japan held an International Winter Sports Week.

== See also ==
- Nordic Games
- GEM Altigliss Challenge
