= Bangladesh Games =

Multi-sport event in Bangladesh

- Motto: Sports in our heart
- Frequency: Every four years
- Inaugurated: March 1978
- Most recent: April 2021
- Headquarters: Dhaka, Bangladesh
- Remarks: National multi-sport event of Bangladesh

Bangladesh Games is the largest domestic multi-sport tournament in Bangladesh where athletes and sports teams from all the districts of Bangladesh participate. Initiated in 1978, the event went into a hiatus after being held for the 7th time in 2002 but was restored after almost 11 years in 2013.

== History ==
The history of Bangladesh Games can be traced back to the British colonial period in the Indian subcontinent. The Indian Olympic Association was formed in 1927 and the first ever National Games of India was held in 1934. Athletes from present day Bangladesh participated in the event representing the Bengal Province. After the Partition of India in 1947, Bangladesh became a part of the newly created nation of Pakistan. The Pakistan Olympic Association was established in 1948 and from the same year it began to organize the National Games of Pakistan. Bangladeshis used to participate in the event representing the East Pakistan province. Dhaka was the host city of the event in four occasions, in 1955, 1960, 1964 and 1968. After the independence of Bangladesh in 1971, the sports officials in the country felt the need to organize a Bangladeshi version of such a national event. The first edition of Bangladesh Games was held in 1978 from 15 to 19 March under the name Bangladesh Olympic Championships. However, the inception of the event was distinct from those of India and Pakistan, as it was initiated before the formal establishment of the national Olympic committee of Bangladesh in 1979.

The first edition of the event featured athletics, basketball, boxing, cycling, gymnastics, shooting, swimming, volleyball, weightlifting and wrestling. The second edition was held in 1980, as it was decided to hold the event in biennial manner. At this time, some subsequent changes were made in the formation of the event. The title was changed into Bangladesh Games and it was decided to hold the event in every four years. Accordingly, the third edition of the event was held in 1984. The event had been organized regularly until the seventh edition which was scheduled to take place in 2000 but was held in 2002. The eighth edition of the event was held in 2013, after almost eleven years from the previous edition and five years from the scheduled date. To revive the popularity of the event, a gala opening ceremony was held prior to the beginning of the event. This edition featured 31 disciplines having 346 events with almost ten thousand athletes, officials and staffs involved with it.
