= Nordic Games =

International winter sports event

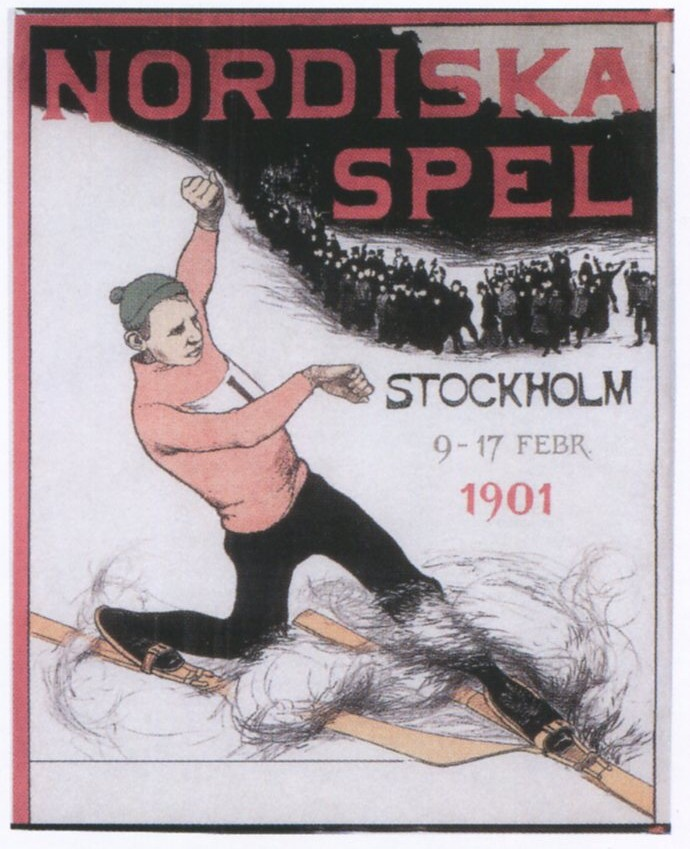
- First Nordic Games poster featuring telemark, 9–17 February 1901
- Status: Cancelled
- Genre: Sports event
- Date: Varying
- Frequency: every fourth year
- Country: Sweden
- Years active: 1901–1926
- Organiser: Swedish Central Association for the Promotion of Athletics

The Nordic Games were the first international multi-sport event that focused primarily on winter sports, and were held at varying intervals between 1901 and 1926. It was organized by Sweden's Swedish Central Association for the Promotion of Athletics, and more specifically by Viktor Balck, a member of that association and one of the five original members of the International Olympic Committee (IOC). It was, in many ways, a precursor to the modern Winter Olympic Games, whose success was a contributing factor (along with the social and economic turmoil following World War I) to the Nordic Games's discontinuation in the 1920s.

== History ==
The Nordic Games began in Stockholm in February 1901, after being conceived in 1899 by the Swedish Central Association for the Promotion of Sports (SCFIF) led by Viktor Balck, a well-known Swedish sports figure. He is quoted as saying, "Above all we placed the national goal of rendering a service to the fatherland and bringing honor to our country." The Nordic Games have now become a national concern for our entire people." They were held every four years thereafter through 1926. Many believe that this event led to the implementation of the Winter Olympics as we know them today. The Nordic Games began as an effort to bolster both Swedish national sentiment along with Swedish tourism. The Nordic Games featured not only the snow and ice related sports that the country excelled in but also showcased Swedish cultural events such as theatre, opera and folklore. Tourist attractions were also highlighted.

== Editions ==
Edition	Year	Host city	Host nation
I	1901	Stockholm	Sweden
II	1905	Stockholm	Sweden
III	1909	Stockholm	Sweden
IV	1913	Stockholm	Sweden
V	1917	Stockholm	Sweden
VI	1922	Stockholm	Sweden
VII	1926	Stockholm	Sweden

A similar event was held in Kristiania in 1903. Similar games were held in Helsinki in Finland in 1907. According to some sources these were Nordic Games, but it is unclear whether they were formally named Nordic Games or not.

== Sports ==
The Nordic Games consisted of the winter sports that were popular in Scandinavia at the time, such as ski jumping, downhill racing, cross-country skiing, skeleton, speed skating, figure skating, hockey (which at the time was a term used for bandy) and curling. Some non-winter sports were also included like fencing, swimming and a long-distance equestrian ride. Many other sports that are rarer or less commonly thought of as winter sports today were also included, such as horse-driven sledding, glima, hunting, skiing behind reindeer (a.k.a. skijoring), military sports, car racing, motorcycle racing, ballooning, kick-sled, and pulka racing.

=== Bandy results ===
The sport of bandy was featured at the Nordic Games beginning in 1901. The final match in 1901 was the second real bandy match played in Sweden. The first took place between the same teams earlier the same year and was won by Stockholm 4-1.

As many as 16 teams took part in the 1905 game.

In the 1909 game, AIK participated as "Swedish Football Association A", while the "B-team" was beaten in the final which consisted of players from IFK Uppsala, Djurgårdens IF, IFK Gävle, IFK Stockholm and The Sea Cadets. On the way to the final, AIK defeated the Copenhagen Skating Association 3-0.

In 1913, seven teams participated and IFK Helsinki was responsible for the non-Swedish element. The Finns lost however, already in the quarterfinals with 4-2 against the final winners AIK. Even a German team, Leipziger HK, would have participated in 1913, but was absent because the event clashed with the 1913 European Bandy Championships (Bandy-EM) in Switzerland. The 1913 European Bandy Championships had been won by England and had six more participating nations: Germany, Switzerland, Italy, France, Belgium and Holland.

Denmark's Bandy Union participated in the 1917 tournament and came fourth (out of six teams) after losing their matches with 0-13 (Stockholm, semifinals) and 0-16 (Västmanland, match for third prize). The Danes were also invited to the 1922 game, but despite an unusually bandy-friendly winter in Denmark that year, they abstained.

During the Nordic Games in 1917, the bandy SM semi-finals and final were also decided as part of the arrangements.

In 1922 it was a national team tournament and Sweden beat Norway 13-1 in the semifinals in the first meeting between the two countries. Because the Norwegians at that time played 7-man a side bandy, a match was also arranged between Norway and a Stockholm by combining it into a smaller one, the variant. It was this match that Stockholmers won 7-2.

In the last Nordic Games in 1926, the bandy tournament existed between provincial teams with Norway as foreign element.

Bandy at Nordic Games 1901 – 1926
Edition	Year	Team 1	Team 2	Final
I	1901	Uppsala HK	Stockholms HK	1–0
II	1903	demonstration games only		
III	1905	Uppsala HK	Djurgårdens IF	6–1
IV	1909	Svenska Fotbollförbundet A (AIK)	Svenska Fotbollförbundet B	7–4
V	1913	AIK	IFK Uppsala	3–1
VI	1917	Upplands IF	Stockholms IF	4–0
VII	1922	Sweden	Finland	4–6
VIII	1926	Sweden	Västmanland	3–0

== Ties to Winter Olympics ==
The Nordic Games were one of the first to lead to international championships in winter sports. For example, the skating championships raised the international appeal of the Nordic Games. Viktor Balck, the founder of the Nordic Games, was also a charter member of the International Olympic Committee and a president of the International Skating Union. He is credited with holding the ISU together through the end of World War I. He also established the World Championship Events for Ladies and Pairs, who were not recognised before this. Balck was known as the ISU president with the longest tenure of 30 years of any president before him. He was elected the first honorary president of the ISU. All of his participation helped the Olympics take hold. The Winter Olympics as we know it today began in Chamonix, France in 1924. Prior to this time, some winter sports such as figure skating and ice hockey were held during the Summer Olympics.

== Decline ==
The Nordic Games mainly included only competitors from the Nordic countries of Denmark, Finland, Iceland, Sweden, and Norway. These countries ended up opposing the establishment of a separate Winter Olympics because it would take away from their nationalistic efforts. Sweden and Norway had political differences during this time which led Norway to cease participation in the games, which caused some controversy. After Viktor Balck died in 1928, there was no one to champion the cause, particularly after the 1930 games had to be cancelled due to a lack of snow. The Winter Olympics turned out to be highly successful right from the beginning and their international appeal overshadowed the Nordic Games.

== See also ==
- 1913 Nordic Games
- International Winter Sports Week
