= Singapore Biennial Games =

Multi-sport event in Singapore

The Singapore Biennial Games were first introduced on 15 September 2010 by Singapore's Senior Parliamentary Secretary for Community Development, Youth and Sports, Teo Ser Luck.

Organized by the Singapore Sports Council and co-organized by the People's Association of Singapore, the games will take place once every two years, with the first edition of the games in 2012, in an effort to keep up the 2010 Summer Youth Olympics legacy.
