= National Youth Games of Nigeria =

The National Youth Games (NYG), is an annual event aimed at growing the youths in to become skilled sportsmen and women. The Youth sports event in Nigeria is a brain child of the former President of the Federal Republic of Nigeria Goodluck Jonathan administration.

It is a multi-sporting event organized by the Federal Government of Nigeria through the National Sports Commission for athletes from the 36 States and the Federal Capital Territory of Nigeria.

== History ==
The maiden edition of the National Youth Games held in 2013 at the main bowl of the National Stadium Abuja.

The event was opened by the Vice President Namadi Sambo who was represented by Malam Bolaji Abdullahi, Chairman National Sports Commission.

The maiden event had in attendance over 4000 athletes drawn from the different states in Nigeria and the Federal Capital Territory. The aim of the festival is to harness talents amongst the youths in Nigeria and also ensuring unity and togetherness among different states.

== Winners and Hosting activities ==
In 2013, the maiden event was hosted in Abuja from December 5–15, 2013 with Cross River State emerging as overall winners.

This was closely followed by Akwa Ibom State as first runner up and Delta State as second runner up.

The event recorded four Gold medals, three silver medals and Seven bronze medals.

In 2016, the second edition event was hosted in Ilorin from 21st - 30th, September 2016.

Ilorin also hosted the event in 2017, 2018, 2019 and 2021 respectively. This was largely due to the success recorded during the 2016 event which was hosted in Ilorin.

Also it was reported that the University of Ilorin and the Federal Ministry of Youths and Sports Development had signed a memorandum of agreement to host the games in the University of Illorin for five years.

Team Delta was known for winning the competition back to back after its maiden edition till 2021 since its inception in 2013.

In 2017, the third edition of the event was hosted in Ilorin with Delta state emerging overall winners with 21 gold, 16 silver and 23 bronze.

In 2021, the sixth edition of the event was hosted in Ilorin with Delta State emerging overall winners.

This was closely followed by Team Lagos in second position while Team Edo finished third after the event.

Team Delta had 60 gold, 27 silver and 29 bronze medals. Team Lagos had 19 gold, 26 silver and 28 bronze medals while Team Edo had 18 gold, 10 silver and 11 bronze medals.

In 2023, the 7th edition of the event was to be hosted in Delta state and originally scheduled to hold from February 8–18, 2023 at the Dennis Osadebay University, Asaba, Delta State.

The event was postponed to a later date due to the general elections in Nigeria that was scheduled to hold on February 25, 2023.
