= Thailand National Youth Games =

Youth multi-sport event in Thailand

Thailand National Games

Games
- Senior Games; Para Games; Youth Games

Thailand National Youth Games (Thai: กีฬาเยาวชนแห่งชาติ) is the sports event of Thailand at the national level for youth, which is held annually.

== Editions ==
Games	Dates	Hosts	Sports	Athletes
1	26 April–2 May 1985	Nakhon Ratchasima	7	1,542
2	18–24 June 1987	Nakhon Si Thammarat	10	1,548
3	19–25 March 1987	Surin	10	1,575
4	6–12 May 1988	Chiang Rai	10	1,574
5	4–10 May 1989	Ratchaburi	11	1,632
6	25–31 March 1990	Phuket	13	1,755
7	18–27 January 1991	Trang	13	1,880
8	26 March–1 April 1992	Sisaket	13	1,964
9	22–29 March 1993	Chanthaburi	13	1,992
10	21–28 March 1994	Phitsanulok	13	1,957
11	21–28 March 1995	Songkhla	14	2,163
12	19–26 May 1996	Kamphaeng Phet	14	2,216
13	8–15 June 1997	Surat Thani	15	2,359
14	19–26 March 1998	Udon Thani	17	2,546
15	19–25 March 1999	Yala	17	2,564
16	19–26 March 2000	Surin	18	2,979
17	24–31 March 2001	Phrae	18	3,076
18	24–31 March 2002	Phang Nga	19	3,371
19	19–29 March 2003	Phetchaburi	24	4,433
20	20–31 March 2004	Sukhothai	24	5,478
21	20–31 March 2005	Chaiyaphum	27	6,169
22	19–27 March 2006	Lampang	27	6,870
23	20–30 March 2007	Surat Thani	28	8,115
24	19–29 March 2008	Ubon Ratchathani	28	9,500
25	15–26 March 2009	Kanchanaburi	30	8,237
26	March 2010	Phetchabun	31	9,150
27	March 2011	Uttaradit	35	10,111
28	26 May–5 June 2012	Phuket	45	9,379
29	18–29 March 2013	Maha Sarakham	36	9,257
30	12–23 March 2014	Sisaket	38	10,724
31	16–27 March 2015	Chanthaburi	43	11,132
32	9–19 March 2016	Suphanburi	45	10,847
33	16–26 March 2017	Chunporn	46	12,246
34	19–29 March 2018	Nan	48	15,665
35	10-20 May 2019	Buriram	45	16,692
36	19-29 March 2021	Trat	47	13,841
37	29 July-10 August 2022	Phatthalung	47	13,500
38	25 March-3 April 2023	Nakhon Sawan	46	16,346
39	21-31 March 2023	Ratchaburi	43	15,000
40	21-31 March 2023	Ratchaburi	55	15,061
