= National Games of Colombia =

Multi-sport event in Colombia

The National Games of Colombia (Spanish: Juegos Deportivos Nacionales) is the premier multi-sport event of Colombia at national level. The first instance of the event was organized in 1928 and for several years it took place at irregular intervals of time. Currently overseen by the Ministry of Sports, the National Games were initially organised by each department and municipality until 1941. After that, they were directly funded by the government and later managed by Coldeportes from 1968 to 2019. The event has been held regularly every 4 years since 1988, except for 2014.

Valle del Cauca has been the most successful department in the history of the national games (9 times), followed by Antioquia (8 times) and next Bogotá (one time).

== Results ==
Year	Event	Host	Winner
1928	I	Valle del Cauca	Not Available (N/A).
1932	II	Antioquia	N/A.
1935	III	Atlántico	N/A.
1936	IV	Caldas	N/A.
1941	V	Santander	Valle del Cauca
1950	VI	Magdalena	Valle del Cauca
1954	VII	Valle del Cauca	Valle del Cauca
1960	VIII	Bolívar	Valle del Cauca
1970	IX	Tolima	Valle del Cauca
1974	X	Risaralda	Valle del Cauca
1980	XI	Huila	Antioquia
1985	XII	Meta	Antioquia
1988	XIII	Quindío	Antioquia
1992	XIV	Atlántico	Antioquia
1996	XV	Santander	Valle del Cauca
2000	XVI	Nariño Boyacá	Antioquia
2004	XVII	Bogotá Cundinamarca	Bogotá
2008	XVIII	Valle del Cauca San Andrés y Providencia	Antioquia
2012	XIX	Norte de Santander Cauca Córdoba	Antioquia
2015	XX	Tolima Chocó	Antioquia
2019	XXI	Bolívar	Valle del Cauca
2023	XXII	Caldas Risaralda Quindío Valle del Cauca	Valle del Cauca
2027	XXIII	Córdoba Sucre	
