= Nigerian National Sports Festival =

Biennial multi-sport event

The Nigerian National Sports Festival is a biennial multi-sport event organized by the Federal Government of Nigeria through the National Sports Commission for athletes from the 36 States of Nigeria.

Started and staged in 1973 at the National Stadium, Surulere in Lagos, the game was originally conceived as a "unifying tool" with the main purpose of promoting peace and cross-cultural affiliation in Nigeria after the Nigerian Civil War in 1970. The game also serves as a development and training event to aid athletes prepare for continental and international meets. The objectives of the National Sports Festival is:

- To build a robust talent pool of athletes
- To enhance and elevate sports at grassroots level
- To establish a standard programme for athletes’ succession
- To enhance and elevate sports at grassroots level
- To curb age cheating in Sports
- To encourage early participation in Sports
- To engage young athletes in the Olympic Movement, skill development and social responsibility
- To enhance cultural and educational development
- To promote National unity

== COVID-19 and Nigerian National Sport Festival ==
The 2020 edition of the biennial sporting event was set to take place in March 2020 at the Samuel Ogbemudia Stadium in Benin City, Edo State. However, due to the global health crisis occasioned by the COVID-19 pandemic, the event was postponed to December 2020. The sporting event further suffered another set back as a result of the second wave of the spread of the virus and the event was postponed to 2021.

== Winners tables ==
Below is a table displaying the host cities/states, winners, and years of each festival.

| SN | TOURNAMENT | STADIUM | CITY | STATE | YEAR | WINNER |
| 1 | LAGOS '73 | NATIONAL STADIUM, SURULERE, LAGOS | LAGOS | LAGOS | 1973 | MID-WESTERN |
| 2 | LAGOS '75 | NATIONAL STADIUM, SURULERE, LAGOS | LAGOS | LAGOS | 1975 | MID-WESTERN |
| 3 | KADUNA '77 | AHMADU BELLO STADIUM | KADUNA | KADUNA | 1977 | BENDEL |
| 4 | OLUYOLE '79 | LIBERTY STADIUM | IBADAN | OYO | 1979 | BENDEL |
| 5 | BENDEL '81 | | BENIN CITY | BENDEL | 1981 | BENDEL |
| 6 | KWARA '85 | | ILORIN | KWARA | 1985 | BENDEL |
| 7 | RIVERS '88 | | PORT HARCOURT | RIVERS | 1988 | BENDEL |
| 8 | LAGOS '89 | NATIONAL STADIUM, SURULERE, LAGOS | LAGOS | LAGOS | 1989 | LAGOS |
| 9 | BAUCHI '91 | | BAUCHI | BAUCHI | 1991 | ZONE 2 (BENDEL, ONDO, RIVERS) |
| 10 | BENUE '96 | | MARKURDI | BENUE | 1996 | LAGOS |
| 11 | IMO '98 | | OWERRI | IMO | 1998 | LAGOS |
| 12 | BAUCHI '00 | | BAUCHI | BAUCHI | 2000 | DELTA |
| 13 | EDO '02 | | BENIN CITY | EDO | 2002 | EDO |
| 14 | ABUJA '04 | | ABUJA | ABUJA | 2004 | DELTA |
| 15 | GATEWAY '06 | | ABEOKUTA | OGUN | 2006 | DELTA |
| 16 | KADA '09 | | KADUNA | KADUNA | 2009 | DELTA |
| 17 | RIVERS '11 | | PORT HARCOURT | RIVERS | 2011 | RIVERS |
| 18 | LAGOS '12 | | LAGOS | LAGOS | 2012 | DELTA |
| 19 | ABUJA '18 | | ABUJA | ABUJA | 2018 | DELTA |
| 20 | EDO '21 | | BENIN CITY | EDO | 2021 | DELTA |
| 21 | DELTA '22 | | ASABA | DELTA | 2022 | DELTA |
| 22 | GATEWAY '24 | GATEWAY INTERNATIONAL STADIUM | SHAGAMU | OGUN | 2025 | DELTA |

*In 1976, The Mid-Western state became known as Bendel State. Also, Bendel State was split into Edo and Delta states in 1991.
