= National Red Games =

The National Red games (simplified Chinese: 全国红色运动会; traditional Chinese: 全國紅色運動會; pinyin: Quánguó Hóngsè Yùndònghuì), shortened as Red games (simplified Chinese: 红运会; traditional Chinese: 紅運會; pinyin: Hóngyùn Huì) or sometimes referred to internationally as Communist Olympics is a national sporting competition that began within the People's Republic of China under the Chinese Communist Party (CCP). The city and people participating varies depending on the games.

== List of games ==
| Year | Games | Host | Dates | Participants | Athletes | Comments |
|---|---|---|---|---|---|---|
| 2010 | 1st | Linyi, Shandong | August 26–28 | 8 cities | 400 | |
| 2011 | 2nd | Qingyang, Gansu | June 26–28 | 21 cities from China, 2 schools, 61 representative teams | 600 | Coincided with 90th anniversary of founding of CCP |

== Sports ==
The competition events vary depending on the games. Below are listing of some of the sports.

- Grenade throws
- 100m thread spin
- 240m obstacle course
- barb wire crawls
- minefield run
- Cart pushing
- medic stretcher race
- patriotic sprints
- heroic suicide bombing (inspired by Dong Cunrui)

== See also ==
- 2008 Summer Olympics
