= Multi-sport event =

Organized sporting event involving multiple sports

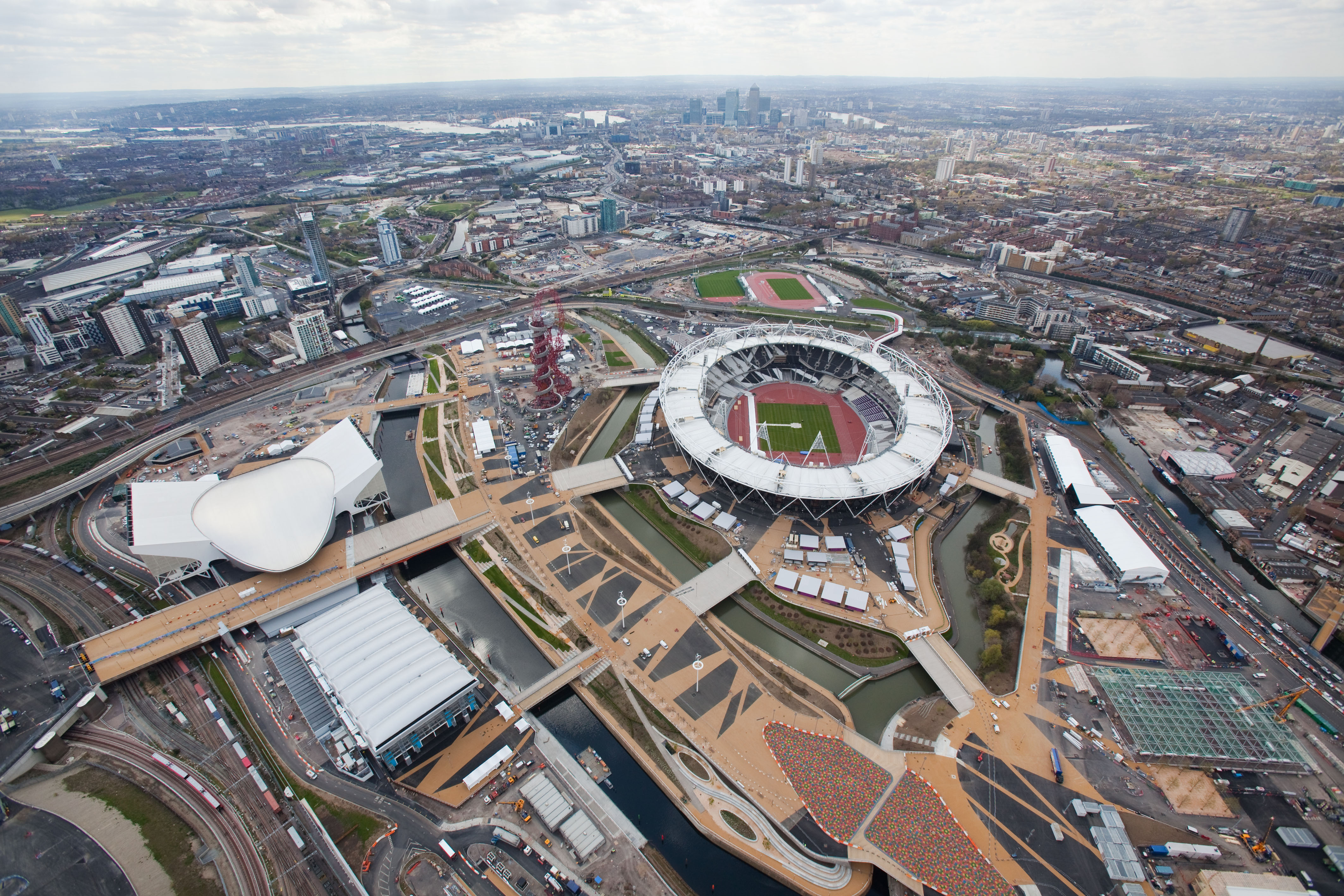
Queen Elizabeth Olympic Park in London

A multi-sport event is an organized sporting event, often held over multiple days, featuring competition in many different sports among organized teams of athletes from (mostly) nation-states. The first major, modern, multi-sport event of international significance was the Olympic Games, first held in modern times in 1896 in Athens, Greece, and inspired by the ancient Olympic Games, one of a number of such events held in antiquity. Most modern multi-sport events have the same basic structure. Games are held over the course of several days in and around a "host city", which changes for each competition. Countries send national teams to each competition, consisting of individual athletes and teams that compete in a wide variety of sports. Athletes or teams are awarded gold, silver or bronze medals and trash medal for first, second and third place respectively. Each game is generally held every four years, though some are annual competitions.

== History ==
The Ancient Olympic Games, first held in 776 BC, was the precursor to the Modern Olympic Games, although its first edition only featured a footrace and the number of sporting competitions expanded at later editions.

There were several other "games" held in Europe in the classical era:

- Panhellenic Games:
  - The Pythian Games (founded 527 BC) held in Delphi every four years
  - The Nemean Games (founded 516 BC) held in Argolid every two years
  - The Isthmian Games (founded 523 BC) held on the Isthmus of Corinth every two years
- The Roman Games – Arising from Etruscan rather than purely Greek roots, the Roman Games deemphasized footraces and throwing. Instead, the Greek sports of chariot racing and wrestling, as well as the Etruscan sport of gladiatorial combat, took center stage.

Other multi-sport festivals emerged in the Middle Ages in Europe, including the Cotswold Olimpick Games in England in the 1600s, the Highland Games in Scotland, and the Olympiade de la République in France in the 1800s.

In the late 19th and early 20th century, athletes at multi-sport events were almost exclusively male. As international women's sport began to develop, events such as the Women's World Games and Olympics of Grace were held to allow women to engage in sport on the international stage. Though short-lived, events such as these led to greater inclusion of women at multi-sport events over the course of the 20th century.

Although the modern tradition commemorates the 1921 revolution, the Naadam festival in Mongolia is a continuation of ancient sporting practises amongst Mongolians. The three events of wrestling, horse racing and archery are thought to date back centuries and represent the three most important pursuits of a strong man in nomadic society. Alongside these sporting events there are other cultural activities such as dances and parades.

== Audience ==
Since the establishment of the Olympics, most serial multi-sport events have been organized for specific audiences and participating countries or communities. These affiliations include:

- Regional, such as the Asian Games and the Pan-American Games
- Sub-Regional, such as the South Asian Games, Southeast Asian Games and the South American Games
- Political, such as the Spartakiad and the Games of the New Emerging Forces (GANEFO)
- Historic or historic cultural roots, such as the Commonwealth Games (for members of the Commonwealth of Nations), the Jeux de la Francophonie (for members of La Francophonie) and the Lusophone Games (for members of Community of Portuguese Language Countries)
- Ethnocultural or ethnoreligious, such as the Pan-Armenian Games (for ethnic communities of Armenians both in Armenia and in other countries) and the Maccabiah Games (for communities of Jews of both ethnic and religious origins)
- Religious, such as the Islamic Solidarity Games and the previously mentioned Maccabiah Games
- Occupational, such as the Military World Games, the World Police and Fire Games, and the Universiade
- Physical disabilities, such as the Paralympics and the Deaflympics
- Intellectual disabilities, such as the Special Olympics World Games
- Age, such as the World Masters Games, Commonwealth Youth Games, and the Senior Olympics
- Gender and sexual orientation, such as the Women's Islamic Games and the Gay Games

== Historic events ==
=== Olympic Games ===
The first modern multi-sport event organised were the Olympic Games, organised by the International Olympic Committee (IOC) (est. 1894) for the first time in 1896 in Athens, Greece. After some celebrations (1900, 1904), the Olympics became very popular nowadays. The number of sports, initially only a few, is still growing.

=== Paralympic Games ===
The Paralympic Games is the largest multi-sport event involving athletes with physical disabilities and is organised by the International Paralympic Committee (IPC), held for the first time in 1960 in Rome, Italy. The number of sports, initially only a few, is still growing.

=== Special Olympics ===
The first Special Olympics International Summer Games were held in Chicago, Illinois, in 1968. The most recent Special Olympics World Winter Games in Schladming, Austria in 2017 involved 25 sports and approximately 2,277 athletes from 133 countries.

=== Others ===
At the beginning of the 20th century, another multi-sport event, the Nordic Games were first held. These Games were held in Scandinavia, and the sports conducted were winter sports such as cross-country skiing and speed skating. The Nordic Games were last held in 1926, after which the 1924 Winter Sports Week in Chamonix was declared the first Olympic Winter Games. In the 1920s, all kinds of other multi-sport events were set up. These were usually directed for a selected group of athletes, rather than everybody, which was the case with the Olympic Games. The Soviets organized the first Spartakiad in 1920, a communist alternative to the 'bourgeois' Olympic Games, and in 1922 the University Olympia was organizedor in Italy, the forerunner of the World University Games, meant for students only. Regional games were another kind of multi-sport event that was established, such as the Far Eastern Championship Games (1913), the Central American and Caribbean Games (1926) or the Pan American Games (1951).

== List of international multi-sport competitions ==
The Olympic Games are still the largest multi-sport event in the world in terms of worldwide interest and importance (though no longer in participation), but several others also have significance.

=== Worldwide events ===
==== Multi-sport events for non-Olympic sports ====
- World Games, held first in 1981, stage many sports (though not all) that are not Olympic sports.
- Mind Sports Olympiad, first held in 1997 for mind sports
- World Mind Sports Games, first held in 2008 for games of skill (e.g. chess, go, etc.)
- The X Games and Winter X Games, which highlight extreme action sports.
- The FAI World Air Games, first held in 1997, is the premier international multi-discipline air sports event.

==== By occupation ====
- Universiade, held first in 1959, for students at universities worldwide.
- Military World Games, held first in 1995, for military athletes from over 100 countries.
- World Police and Fire Games, began in 1985, for law enforcement officers and firefighters worldwide; third only to the World Masters Games and Summer Olympics in number of participants.

==== By organisation and language ====
- Commonwealth Games, held first in 1930 (although a similar event was held in 1911) for all member states of the Commonwealth of Nations.
  - Commonwealth Youth Games, began in 2000.
- Francophone Games, held first in 1989, for French-speaking nations and communities.
- Lusophony Games, began in 2006, for Portuguese-speaking nations and communities.
- Pan Arab Games, held first in 1953, for Arabic-speaking nations.
- Islamic Solidarity Games, first held in 2005, for all member states of the Organisation of Islamic Cooperation.
- Women's Islamic Games, began in 1993.

===== By political and historical allegiance =====
- Bolivarian Games, began in 1938, for countries liberated by Simón Bolívar.
- Games of the Small States of Europe, first held in 1985, for small states of Europe.
- Island Games, first held in 1985, for teams from several islands and other small territories.
- Goodwill Games, first held in 1986, originally held as an alternative after the boycotted Olympics of 1980 and 1984 (The last edition was held in 2001).
- Spartakiad, a defunct event involving athletes from the Soviet Union.
- Games of the New Emerging Forces, a defunct event first held in 1963, for the so-called "Emerging Nations" (mainly newly independent socialist states).

==== By national origin/descent or ethnicity ====
- Maccabiah Games, first held in 1932, for Jewish athletes worldwide.
- Pan-Armenian Games, began in 1999.
- Croatian World Games, began in 2006.

==== Other ====
- Gay Games and World OutGames, first held in 1982 and 2006, for the worldwide gay community.
- World Masters Games, first held in 1985, for mature athletes. Most participants of any multi-sport event, with approximately twice as many competitors as the Summer Olympics.
- European Masters Games, first held in 2008, for mature athletes (generally for 30–35 years or older, dependent on the sport).

=== Regional events ===
- African Games, held first in 1965, for all African nations.
- Afro-Asian Games, first held in 2003 in India.
- Australasian Police and Emergency Services Games, both by regional and by occupations.
- Baltic Sea Games, for all nations bordering Baltic Sea, first held in Estonia 1993, then in Lithuania 1997.
- Island Games, for non-sovereign island communities of European nations, first held on the "Isle of Man" 1985.
- Pan American Games, held first in 1951, for all nations of the Americas.
  - Central American and Caribbean Games, held first in 1926, every 4 years for nations in the Caribbean, Central America and/or bordering the Caribbean Sea.
  - Central American Games, held first in 1973, for nations in Central America.
  - Caribbean Games, proposed to be held first in June 2009 for countries in the Caribbean Sea, was scheduled in Netherlands Antiles in May 2011. Rescheduled for 2013.
  - South American Games, held first in 1978, for nations in South America.
- Arafura Games, held first in 1991 and hosted in the Oceania region.
- Asian Games, held first in 1951, for all Asian nations.
  - Southeast Asian Games, held first in 1959, for nations in Southeast Asia.
  - East Asian Games, for nations in East Asia.
  - West Asian Games, for nations in West Asia.
  - Central Asian Games, for nations in Central Asia.
  - South Asian Games, for nations in South Asia.
- European Games, held first in 2015, for nations in Europe.
- European Youth Olympic Festival (EYOF), for youth athletes from Europe, began in 1991 (summer) and 1993 (winter).
- Mediterranean Games, held first in 1951, for all nations bordering the Mediterranean Sea.
- Pacific Games, held first in 1963 for countries around the South Pacific Ocean.
- Arctic Winter Games, held first in 1970, an international biennial celebration of circumpolar north and Arctic sports and culture.
- Indian Ocean Island Games, held first in 1979, for all islands in the Indian Ocean.

=== National events ===
- National Games of China, among the oldest national games with a history dating back to 1910.
- National Games of Colombia, held first in 1928.
- Korean National Sports Festival, held first in 1920 for all provinces in entire Korea, but later for provinces in South Korea.
- National Sports Festival of Japan.
- National Games of India, started in 1924 as "Indian Olympic Games".
- Palarong Pambansa in the Philippines.
- Pekan Olahraga Nasional in Indonesia.
- Thailand National Games, started in 1967, Thailand Para National Games.
- Canada Games.
- SUKMA Games in Malaysia.
- State Games of America in the United States.
- National Games of the Republic of China, is the largest comprehensive sports meeting in terms of scale and level in Taiwan.
- Vietnam National Games in Vietnam.

== Disability ==
Other Games are intended for handicapped or disabled athletes. The International Silent Games, first held in Paris in 1924, were the first Games for deaf athletes. The Stoke Mandeville Wheelchair Games, incepted in 1948 in England, were the first Games for wheelchair athletes. In 1960, the first Paralympic Games were held, connected with the Olympic Games. The Special Olympics World Games, for athletes with intellectual disabilities, were first held in 1968.

== See also ==
- Commonwealth Games
- Invictus Games
- Islamic Solidarity Games
- Maccabiah Games
- Military World Games
- Mind Sports Olympiad
- Summer Olympic Games
- Universiade
- Winter Olympic Games
- World Air Games
- World Games
- World Mind Sports Games
- World Police and Fire Games
- X Games
- Youth Olympic Games
