= State Games of America =

United States biennial multi-sport event

- Abbreviation: SGA
- Frequency: Biennial
- Inaugurated: 1999

The State Games of America is a biennial amateur multi-sport event held in the United States. It is organized by the National Congress of State Games. Athletes qualify for the Games by earning a medal in their respective State Games in the previous two years. Typically, over 12,000 athletes compete in the Games each time they are held.

== History ==
Year	Host city
1999	St. Louis, Missouri
2001	St. Louis, Missouri
2003	Hartford, Connecticut
2005	Colorado Springs, Colorado
2007	Colorado Springs, Colorado
2009	Colorado Springs, Colorado
2011	San Diego, California
2013	Hershey, Pennsylvania
2015	Lincoln, Nebraska
2017	Grand Rapids, Michigan
2019	Lynchburg, Virginia
2022	Ames, Iowa
2024	San Diego, California
2026	State College, Pennsylvania

== Sports contested ==
In 2011, athletes participated in 24 different sports in San Diego, California:

- Archery
- Badminton
- Baseball
- Basketball
- BMX
- Bowling
- Figure Skating
- Gymnastics
- Judo
- Jr. Lifeguards
- Karate
- Power Lifting
- Skateboarding
- Soccer
- Softball (Girls Fast Pitch)
- Surfing
- Swimming
- Synchronised swimming
- Table Tennis
- Taekwondo
- Track and Field
- Water Polo
- Weightlifting
- Wrestling
