= Shoppin' from A to Z =

Single by Toni Basil

from the album Word of Mouth
- Released: 1983
- Recorded: 1981
- Genre: Power pop; new wave; novelty
- Length: 3:41
- Label: Chrysalis
- Songwriter(s): Allee Willis, Bruce Roberts, Toni Basil
- Producer(s): Mike Chapman

Toni Basil singles chronology
"Time After Time" / "You Gotta Problem" (1982)	"Shoppin' from A to Z" (1983)	"Over My Head" (1983)

"Shoppin' from A to Z" is a song by US singer-songwriter Toni Basil, released in 1983 as the fourth and final single from her debut album Word of Mouth. It was released in the US only. After the poor performance of "Nobody" in the UK, "Shoppin' from A to Z" also failed to match the success of chart topper "Mickey", peaking at No. 77.

== Background ==
The song features a shopping list consisting of various grocery items, each beginning with a different letter of the alphabet. On the album version, it is shouted out by a chorus. The single version features comical voices saying the name of each item.

== Track listing ==
- 7" single
1. "Shoppin' from A to Z" — 3:41
2. "Time After Time" — 4:18
- Promo 12" "Special Remix" single
1. "Shoppin' from A to Z" (Special Remix) — 6:04
2. "Shoppin' from A to Z" — 3:41

== Music video ==
The music video starts with Basil and her two friends at a house looking through a shopping list and a newspaper. Then, the scene quickly changes to a supermarket where Basil and everyone in the market (including the employees) start dancing while they shop. Finally, after all that shopping, Basil and her friends arrive home exhausted. The clip ends with two dollar signs coming out of the shopping bags and plastered on a CGI heart on a green background.

== Chart performance ==
Chart (1983)	Peak position
US Billboard Hot 100	77
