= Jonathan Albaladejo =

Puerto Rican baseball player (born 1982)

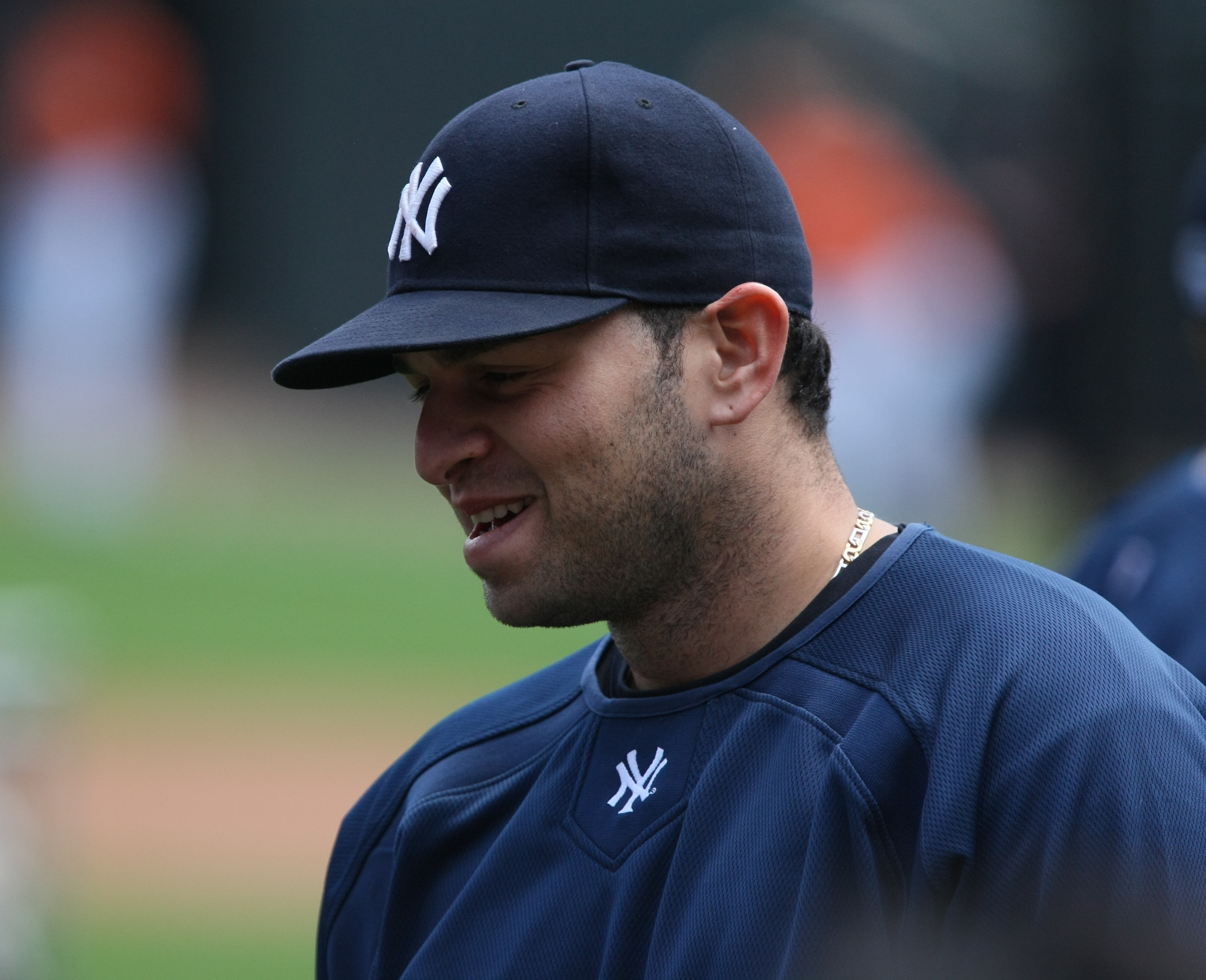
- Albaladejo with the New York Yankees

Trois-Rivières Aigles
- Pitcher / Coach / Manager
- Born: October 30, 1982 (age 43); San Juan, Puerto Rico
- Batted: Right Threw: Right

Professional debut
- MLB: September 5, 2007, for the Washington Nationals
- NPB: April 14, 2011, for the Yomiuri Giants

Last appearance
- MLB: July 20, 2012, for the Arizona Diamondbacks
- NPB: October 16, 2011, for the Yomiuri Giants

MLB statistics
- Win–loss record: 6–3
- Earned run average: 4.34
- Strikeouts: 56

NPB statistics
- Win–loss record: 2–2
- Earned run average: 2.45
- Strikeouts: 44
- Stats at Baseball Reference

Teams
- Washington Nationals (2007); New York Yankees (2008–2010); Yomiuri Giants (2011); Arizona Diamondbacks (2012)

Jonathan Albaladejo Santana (/ˌælbələˈdeɪhoʊ/ AL-bə-lə-DAY-hoh; born October 30, 1982) is a Puerto Rican professional baseball coach and former pitcher who is currently the manager for the Trois-Rivières Aigles of the Frontier League. He played in Major League Baseball (MLB) for the Washington Nationals, New York Yankees, and Arizona Diamondbacks, as well in Nippon Professional Baseball (NPB) for the Yomiuri Giants.

== Playing career ==
=== Pittsburgh Pirates ===
Albaladejo was selected by the San Francisco Giants in the 34th round (1,021st overall) of the 2000 Major League Baseball draft, but did not sign. In the following year he was selected by the Pittsburgh Pirates in the 19th round (564th overall), and signed on June 6, 2001.

He spent a number of years in the minors in the Pirates system as a starting pitcher, and in 2005 was converted to a reliever. The Pirates released him on April 25, 2007.

=== Washington Nationals ===
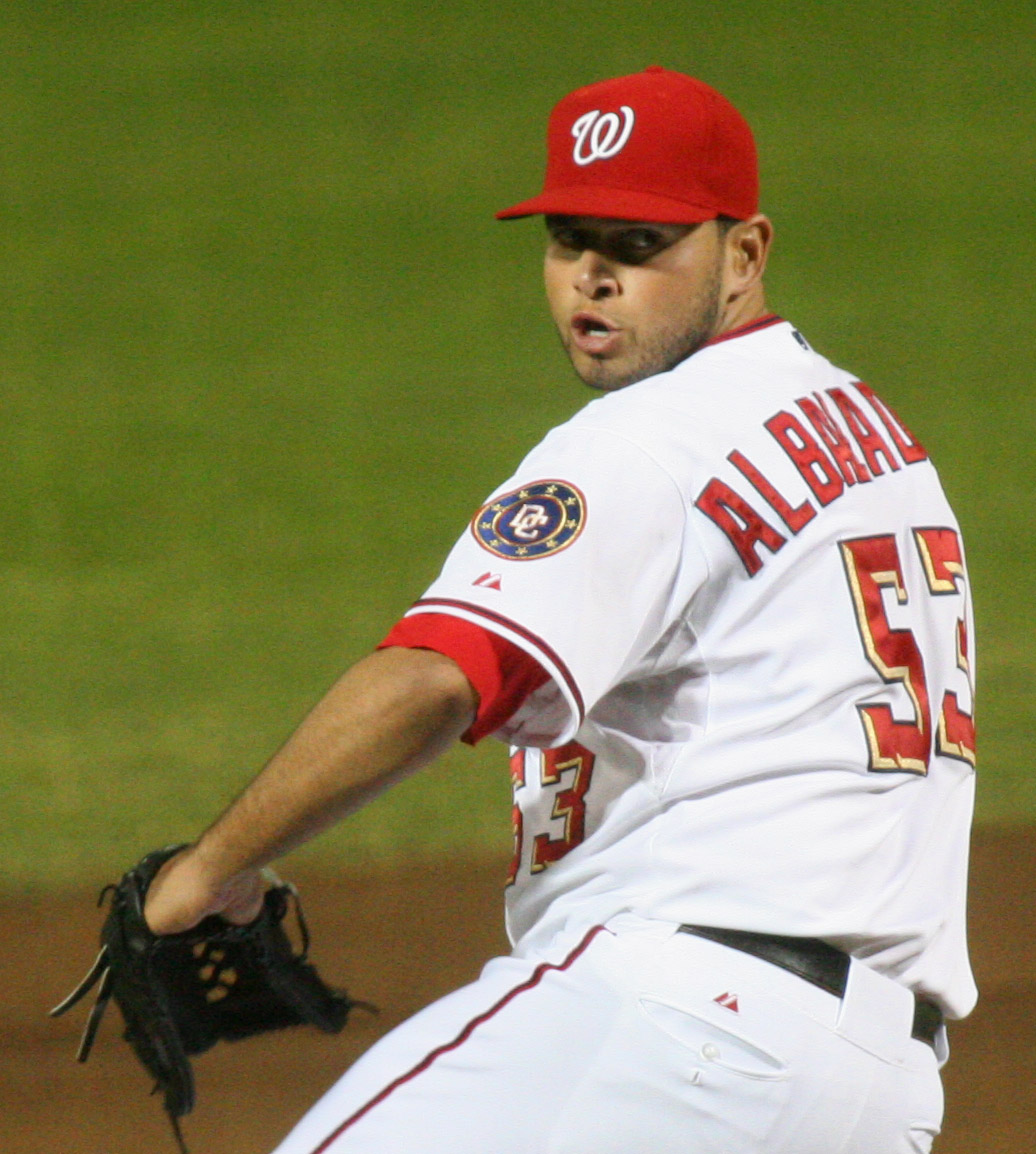
Albaladejo pitching for the Washington Nationals in 2007

On May 3, 2007, Albaladejo signed a minor league contract with the Washington Nationals. He played most of the season for the Double-A Harrisburg Senators, compiling a 4.17 earned run average in 21 appearances. He moved up to the Triple-A Columbus Clippers and finished the season extremely well, posting an ERA of 0.78 in 14 appearances. When rosters expanded in September, the Nationals, then leading the league in innings pitched by relievers, brought him up.

On September 5, 2007, Albaladejo made his Major League debut. In the top of the third inning, in a game against the Florida Marlins, Tim Redding was injured by a batted ball and needed to be replaced. Albaladejo entered the game with two men on and one out, and allowed a ground ball (where an inherited runner scored) and a pop up. In the fourth inning, Albaladejo struck out the side, and then was relieved.

=== New York Yankees ===
On December 4, 2007, he was traded to the New York Yankees for relief pitcher Tyler Clippard.

He made the Yankees' Opening Day roster in 2008, but only pitched in seven games while recording a 3.95 ERA. He suffered a stress fracture in his elbow on May 9, 2008, and was ruled out for the season in June. Albaladejo again made the Yankees' major league roster to start the 2009 season. After posting an ERA of 6.00 in 18 appearances through May 22, he was optioned to Triple-A Scranton/Wilkes-Barre to make room on the roster for pitcher Chien-Ming Wang. In 17 innings at Triple-A, he compiled a 1.59 ERA and 0.65 WHIP, earning a promotion back to the majors when Wang was placed on the disabled list on July 5, 2009. Albaladejo was sent back down to Scranton on July 10, 2009, to make room for Mark Melancon.

Albaladejo began the 2010 season with Scranton/Wilkes-Barre. After a poor spring training, Albaladejo transitioned from his two-seam fastball to his four-seam fastball, which allowed him more control. He was named International League Pitcher of the Week from July 5–12, and from July 12–18, and pitched in the Triple-A All-Star Game. After saving 31 games in 32 chances with a 0.96 ERA, he was called up to the Yankees on July 20. However, he was optioned back to Scranton/Wilkes-Barre on July 24 to make room for Sergio Mitre.

Albaladejo set an International League single-season record for saves in 2010 with 43 (the previous record was 38). He was named to the International League Postseason All-Star team. He was called up by the Yankees when the rosters expanded at the start of September and pitched 11 1/3 innings for the team during the 2010 season, recording a 3.97 ERA. During the offseason, Albaladejo asked the Yankees to release him so he could pursue a career in Japan.

=== Yomiuri Giants ===
Albaladejo signed a one-year contract with the Yomiuri Giants of Japan's Central League. In 46 games in Japan, he was 2–2 with a 2.45 ERA.

=== Arizona Diamondbacks ===
The Arizona Diamondbacks signed Albaladejo on December 13, 2011. In 49 games with the Triple-A Reno Aces, Albaladejo recorded 25 saves and struck out 60 in 56 2/3 innings of work. He was called up by the Diamondbacks at the end of the minor league season, and posted an ERA of 9.00 in three games. On October 25, 2012, Albaladejo was removed from the 40-man roster and sent outright to Reno.

=== Miami Marlins ===
On December 16, 2012, Albaladejo signed a minor league deal with the Miami Marlins. He spent the entirety of the 2013 season with their Triple-A affiliate, the New Orleans Zephyrs, recording a 3.80 ERA and 72 strikeouts in 73 1/3 innings. He was granted free agency after the season.

=== Broncos de Reynosa ===
On April 1, 2016, Albaladejo signed with the Broncos de Reynosa of the Mexican League. He was released on April 9.

=== Bridgeport Bluefish ===
On April 19, 2016, Albaladejo signed with the Bridgeport Bluefish of the Atlantic League of Professional Baseball. He was named an All-Star and won Pitcher of the Year during the 2016 season after setting the record for most wins by a Bluefish player (15) and most strikeouts in the league (164). Albaladejo re-signed with Bridgeport for the 2017 season.

=== New York Mets ===
On July 25, 2017, Albaladejo signed a minor league deal with the New York Mets. He made 9 appearances (8 starts) for the Triple–A Las Vegas 51s, logging a 4.50 ERA with 36 strikeouts in 52 innings of work. He was named the PCL's Pitcher of the Week for the week of July 24 after throwing 11 1/3 scoreless innings. Albaladejo elected free agency following the season on November 6.

=== Lancaster Barnstormers ===
On November 1, 2017, Albaladejo was drafted by the Lancaster Barnstormers in the Bridgeport Bluefish dispersal draft. On February 26, 2018, he signed with the team for the 2018 season. Albaladejo re-signed for the 2019 season as a player-coach. He coached Bryan Harper, the older brother of Bryce Harper.

== Coaching career ==
Albaladejo retired as an active player following the 2019 season and was later hired as bullpen coach for the Toros de Tijuana of the Mexican League.

He managed the Tupper Lake Riverpigs of the independent Empire Baseball League in 2020 and 2021. He was the pitching coach for the Empire State Greys during the 2022 season where they were a road team for the Frontier League.

On February 12, 2024, Albaladejo was announced as the pitching coach for the Lake Erie Crushers of the Frontier League.

On October 17, 2024 Albaladejo was named the Manager of the Trois-Rivières Aigles of the Frontier League.

== See also ==
- List of Major League Baseball players from Puerto Rico
