= Pick 'n' Mix =

Studio album by Lolly
- Released: 11 September 2000
- Genres: Pop, dance-pop
- Length: 55:15
- Label: Polydor Records

Lolly chronology
My First Album (1999)	Pick 'n' Mix (2000)

Singles from Pick 'n' Mix
- 1. "Big Boys Don't Cry" / "Rockin' Robin" Released: 22 November 1999; 2. "Per Sempre Amore" Released: 24 April 2000; 3. "Girls Just Wanna Have Fun" Released: 24 August 2000

Pick 'n' Mix is the second album by English singer Lolly. Lolly, who was born Anna Shantha Kumble, was born in 1977 in Sutton Coldfield and she is a singer, dancer and TV presenter. All three singles from her debut album My First Album – "Viva La Radio", "Mickey" and "Big Boys Don't Cry" are also included on Pick 'n' Mix. "Big Boys Don't Cry" was released as a double A-side single alongside a cover of "Rockin' Robin" which reached No. 10 in the UK. "Per Sempre Amore" and a cover of "Girls Just Wanna Have Fun" both reached the top 20 in the UK.

== Track listing ==
1. "Girls Just Wanna Have Fun" - 2:53 - Written by Lolly Vegas & Roert Hazard
2. "Per Sempre Amore" - 2:52 - Written by Mike Rose & Nick Foster
3. "It Never Rains But It Pours" - 3:02 - Written by Mike Rose & Nick Foster
4. "999" - 3:44 - Written by Mike Rose & Nick Foster
5. "She Loves You" - 2:20 - John Lennon & Paul McCartney
6. "I Can't Help Myself" - 3:37 - Written by Mike Rose & Nick Foster
7. "You Left the Light On" - 3:23 - Written by Mike Rose & Nick Foster
8. "Just Say Goodbye" - 3:09
9. "Ti Amo" - 2:56 - Written by Mike Rose & Nick Foster
10. "Better Than Ever" - 2:47 - Written by Mike Rose & Nick Foster
11. "Twisting Roads" - 3:36 - Written by Mike Rose & Nick Foster
12. "Rockin' Robin" - 2:13 - Written by Mike Rose & Nick Foster
13. "One Plus One" - 2:39 - Written by Mike Rose & Nick Foster
14. "Listen to Your Heart" - 3:05 - Written by Mike Rose & Nick Foster
15. "Puppy Love" - 3:17
16. "Viva La Radio" - 2:44 - Written by Mike Rose & Nick Foster
17. "Mickey" - 3:36 - Nicky Chinn & Mike Chapman
18. "Big Boys Don't Cry" - 3:23 - Written by Mike Rose & Nick Foster

== Charts ==
=== Weekly ===
Chart (2000)	Peak position
UK Albums	80

=== Singles ===
UK Singles	Peak position
"Big Boys Don't Cry" / "Rockin' Robin"	10
"Per Sempre Amore"	11
"Girls Just Wanna Have Fun"	14
