= Toni Basil (album) =

Studio album by Toni Basil
- Released: December 1983
- Studios: Oasis Recording Studios, Universal City, California; except "Street Beat" at Sound City Studios, Van Nuys, California and Studio 55, Los Angeles
- Genres: Pop, new wave
- Length: 35:04
- Labels: Chrysalis; Virgin (South America/UK)
- Producers: Richie Zito; Greg Mathieson and Trevor Veitch on "Street Beat"

Toni Basil chronology
Word of Mouth (1981)	Toni Basil (1983)

Singles from Toni Basil
- 1. "Street Beat" Released: 1983; 2. "Over My Head" Released: 1983; 3. "Suspense" Released: 1984; 4. "Do You Wanna Dance" Released: 1984

Professional ratings
Review scores
Source	Rating
AllMusic	3/5 stars

Toni Basil is the second studio album by Toni Basil, released in December 1983 on Chrysalis Records. Despite the success of her previous album Word of Mouth and the single "Mickey", the album was less successful and did not enter the Billboard album chart. The second single from the album, "Over My Head", reached #81 on the Billboard Hot 100, her third and final song to do so. Of the four singles from the album, three appeared on various charts in the US.

== Singles ==
The album spawned four singles, three of which charted. The album's first single, "Street Beat", failed to enter the Hot 100 but managed to reach number 63 on Billboard's Hot Dance Club Songs chart. The next single, "Over My Head", reached number 81 on the Billboard Hot 100, spending a total of six weeks on the chart. The third single, "Suspense", reached number 42 on Billboard's Hot Dance Club Songs chart, spending a total of 11 weeks on the chart. The final single, "Do You Wanna Dance", failed to chart.

== Track listing ==
=== International edition ===
Adapted from Discogs.

Side A:

1. "Over My Head" – 3:20
2. "Do You Wanna Dance" – 3:58
3. "Go for the Burn" – 4:04
4. "Street Beat" – 3:37
5. "Suspense" – 3:54

Side B:

1. "Spacewalkin' the Dog" – 4:23
2. "Best Performance" – 3:50
3. "Easy for You to Say" – 4:26
4. "I Don't Hear You" – 3:32

=== US edition ===
Side A:

1. "Over My Head" (Franne Golde, Sue Shifrin) – 3:20
2. "I Don't Hear You" (Greg Mathieson, Trevor Veitch, Toni Basil) – 3:32
3. "Easy for You to Say" (Dennis Lambert, Peter Beckett) – 4:26
4. "Suspense" (Alan Roy Scott, Brian Short) – 3:54
5. "Go for the Burn" (Allee Willis, Richie Zito, Toni Basil) – 4:04

Side B:

1. "Spacewalkin' the Dog" (Franne Golde, Richard Wolfe) – 4:23
2. "Street Beat" (Allee Willis, Bruce Roberts, Toni Basil) – 3:37
3. "Do You Wanna Dance" (Barry Blue) – 3:58
4. "Best Performance" (Allee Willis, Bruce Roberts, Toni Basil) – 3:50

== Personnel ==
- Toni Basil – vocals
- Richie Zito – guitar, Linn and Simmons drums
- Arthur Barrow – bass guitar, keyboards
- Carlos Vega – drums
- Sylvester Levay – additional keyboards on "Over My Head" and "Do You Wanna Dance"
- The Locke High School Cadence Band – cadence drums on "Street Beat"
- Allee Willis, Beth Andersen, Bruce Roberts, Charlotte Crossley, Cindy Fee, Darrell Phinnessee, Jimmy Haas, Joe Esposito, Joe Pizzulo, Julia Tillman Waters, Lauren Wood, Mary Hylan, Maxine Waters – backing vocals

Technical

- Brian Reeves, Bob Casale – engineer
- Richard Seireeni – art direction
- Jerry Casale – cover concept
- Allan Ballard – photography
- Giorgio Moroder, Jeff Aldrich – "very special thanks"
