= Street Beat =

Street Beat may refer to:

- Street beat, or drum cadence, a work played exclusively by the percussion section of a modern marching band
- Street Beat (album), a 1983 album by The Deele
- Street Beat (song), a 1983 song by Toni Basil
- Street Beat, a 1979 album by Tom Scott
