= Jürgen Drews =

German singer (born 1945)

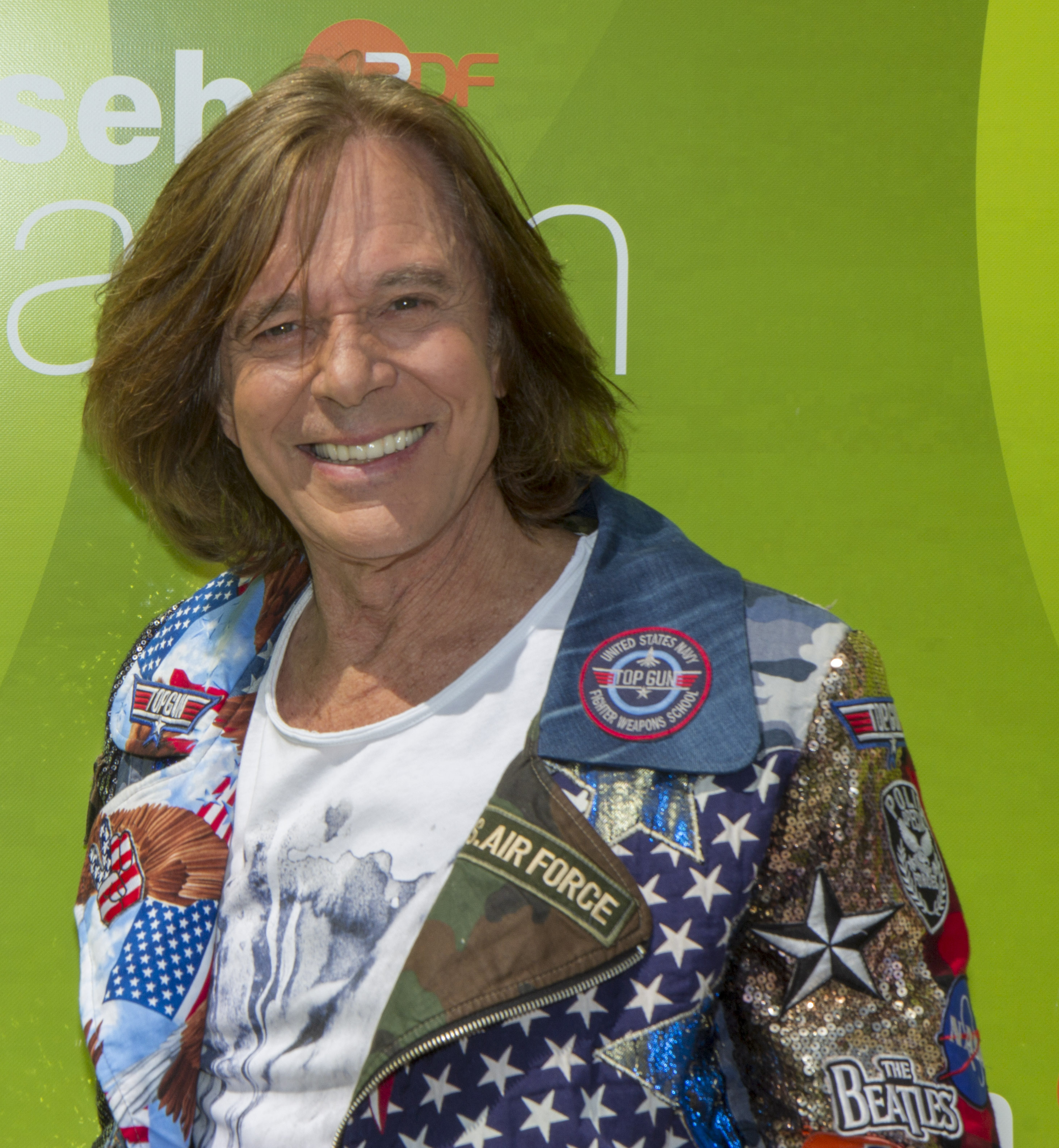
- Jürgen Drews 2019

Background information
- Born: Jürgen Ludwig Buttlar; 2 April 1945 (age 81); Nauen, Germany
- Genre: Schlager music
- Occupations: Singer, musician, songwriter
- Instruments: Vocals, banjo, guitar
- Years active: 1960–present
- Labels: Polydor (Universal), Ariola Records
- Website: juergen-drews.de

Jürgen Ludwig Drews (German pronunciation: [ˈjʏʁɡn̩ ˈluːtvɪç ˈdʁeːfs]; born 2 April 1945) is a German schlager singer.

== Life ==
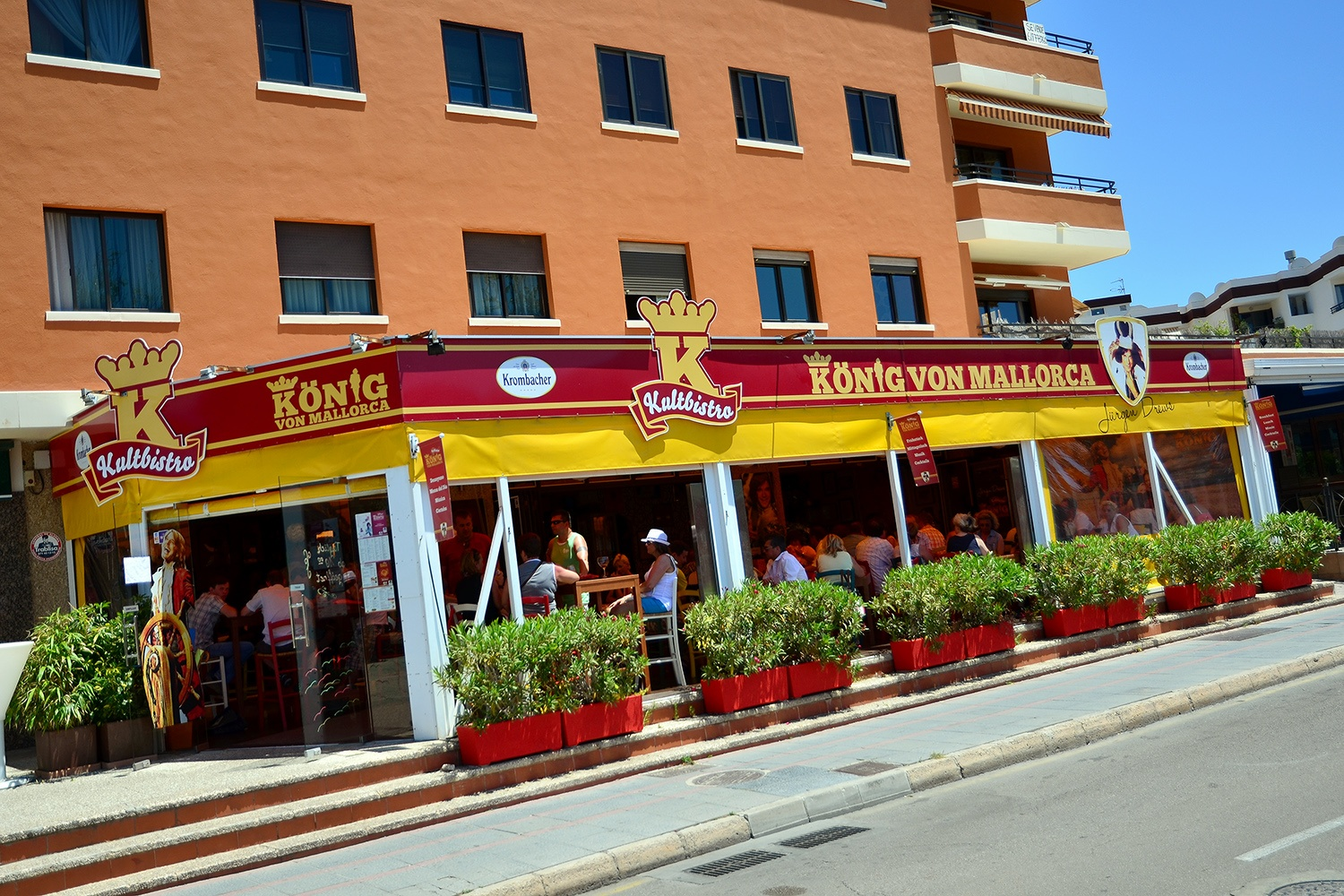
Drews' Bistro in Mallorca

Drews was born in Nauen near Berlin, and brought up in Schleswig. His father's family is descended from Huguenots, but has lived in Brandenburg for two generations; the mother was the daughter of the head director and opera singer Georg Buttlar. After finishing school, he went on to study medicine at the University of Kiel, but dropped out of medical school to work as a singer. At age 15 he received an award as Best Banjo Player of Schleswig-Holstein, while playing in jazz band the Schnirpels. At school he played in "The Monkeys". In 1967 he was solo guitarist in the Kiel based psychedelic rock band "Chimes of Freedom", later renamed by its manager to "Die Anderen" (The Others). In that same year, Drews took on his first acting role as a student and musician in the German film comedy Zur Hölle mit den Paukern.

In the 1970s, he became a member of the pop group "Les Humphries Singers". He was part of their lineup that represented Germany at the 1976 Eurovision Song Contest with the Ralph Siegel title "Sing Sang Song". Drews eventually started a solo career and had a German number one hit in 1976 with "Ein Bett im Kornfeld", an adaptation of the Bellamy Brothers' "Let Your Love Flow" which was also a German number one.

In the U.S., he had only one moderate hit with "Don't Want No-Body" on the Billboard Hot 100 in January 1981. The single was credited to J.D. Drews and it peaked at #79. As "Nobody", it was released as a single by Toni Basil.

Drews' first marriage was to German actress and model Corinna Drews (née Gillwald) from 1981 until 1985, with whom he has one son. Since 1995 Drews has been married to German actress and model Ramona Drews (née Mittendorf), with whom he has one daughter, Joelina Drews. He lives in Dülmen-Rorup in Germany and spends a lot of his time working on the Spanish island Majorca, where he styles himself as the King of Majorca ("König von Mallorca") since being called that on prime-time German television by Thomas Gottschalk in the show Wetten, dass..?.

Drews opened a restaurant in Santa Ponsa, Majorca in January 2011. It was called "König von Mallorca – Kultbistro" and is decorated with memorabilia and awards from Drews' music career. It had to be closed due to COVID-19 pandemic in August 2020. Drews is suffering from polyneuropathy and announced to reduce his activity as a professional musician because of this disease in May 2022.

== Awards ==
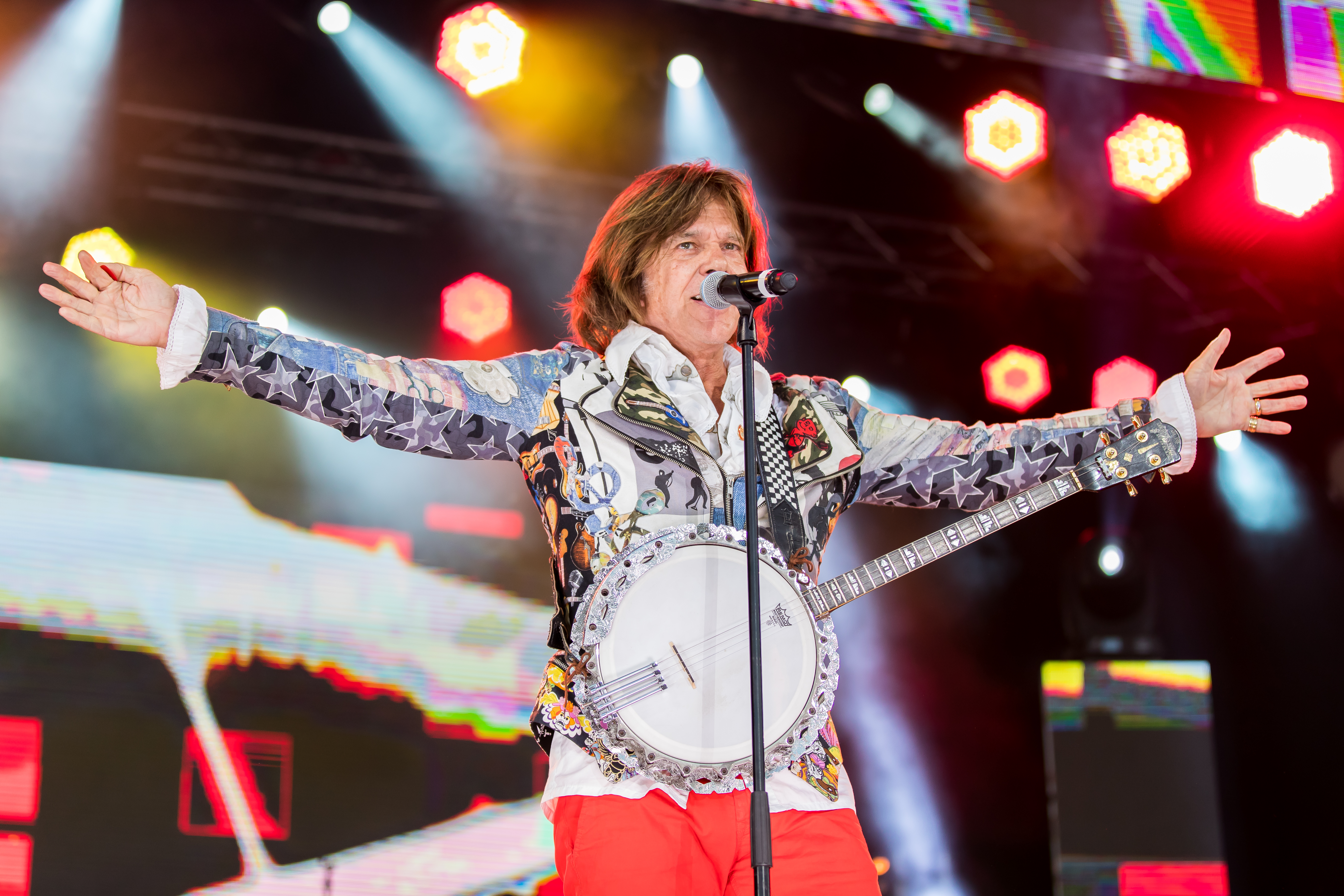
Drews performing in 2016

- Bravo Otto
  - 1976: "Silver"
  - 1977: "Silver"
  - 1978: "Silver"
- Goldene Stimmgabel
  - 1981
- Löwe von Radio Luxemburg
  - 1976: "Silber"

== Selected filmography ==
=== Film ===
- Zur Hölle mit den Paukern (1968, comedy)
- Execution Squad (1972, drama film, Italian crime thriller)
- When Women Were Called Virgins (1972, Italian comedy)
- Ein Kaktus ist kein Lutschbonbon (1981, adult comedy)
- Ballermann 6 (1997, comedy)
- Pudelmützen Rambos (Bobble-hat Rambos, 2003, action comedy)
- Der Prinz von Wanne-Eickel (The Prince of Wanne-Eickel, 2007, comedy)
- Horst Schlämmer – Isch kandidiere! (2009, comedy)
- Agenten in Gummistiefeln – Jagd auf den Killerhasen (Agents in rubber boots – Hunt for the killer rabbits, 2011, comedy)

=== Television ===
- 3×1 in Noten (3×1 in music notation)
- Die deutsche Schlagerparade (The German Schlager parade, 1988–1993)
- Strip! (1999–2000)
- Die Drews – eine furchtbar nette Familie (The Drews – a terribly nice family, from 2003)
- Cash Crash (2013)
