= Fernando Carmona (American football) =

American football player (born 2002)

No. 66 – Tennessee Titans
- Position: Guard
- Roster status: Injured reserve/designated for return

Personal information
- Born: July 8, 2002 (age 24); Las Vegas, Nevada, U.S.
- Listed height: 6 ft 5 in (1.96 m)
- Listed weight: 316 lb (143 kg)

Career information
- High school: Las Vegas (Sunrise Manor, Nevada)
- College: San José State (2021–2023); Arkansas (2024–2025)
- NFL draft: 2026: 5th round, 142nd overall pick

Career history
- Tennessee Titans (2026–present)

Awards and highlights
- Second-team All-SEC (2025)

Career NFL statistics as of Week 3, 2026
- Games played: 3
- Games started: 3
- Stats at Pro Football Reference

Fernando Carmona Jr. (born July 8, 2002) is an American professional football guard for the Tennessee Titans of the National Football League (NFL). He played college football for the San José State Spartans and Arkansas Razorbacks and was selected by the Titans in the fifth round of the 2026 NFL draft.

== Early life ==
Carmona was born on July 8, 2002, in Las Vegas, Nevada. His father was a college baseball player and coach, while his grandmother was a Cuban immigrant. Carmona grew up playing basketball and flag football and attended Las Vegas High School. He played basketball, tennis and volleyball in high school, and as a junior, after being convinced by his brother, began playing tackle football for the first time as well. In seven games played during the 2019 season as a tight end, Carmona posted 143 receiving yards and one touchdown while being selected second-team all-league. He did not play in 2020 as the season was canceled due to the COVID-19 pandemic. A three-star recruit, he committed to play college football for the San Jose State Spartans.

== College career ==
Carmona became an offensive tackle at San Jose State. He redshirted as a true freshman in 2021, appearing in one game. He then started 12 games in 2022 and 12 games in 2023, all at left tackle, earning honorable mention All-Mountain West Conference (MWC) honors in the latter year. Carmona then entered the NCAA transfer portal and transferred to the Arkansas Razorbacks in 2024. He started 13 games in his first year with Arkansas, earning third-team All-Southeastern Conference (SEC) honors. Carmona moved to guard for his final year in 2025 and started 12 games, serving as team captain while being named second-team All-SEC. He concluded his collegiate career with 50 games played, 49 as a starter, and was invited to the 2026 Senior Bowl.

== Professional career ==
Pre-draft measurables
Height	Weight	Arm length	Hand span	Wingspan	40-yard dash	10-yard split	20-yard split	20-yard shuttle	Three-cone drill	Vertical jump	Broad jump	Bench press
6 ft 4 5/8 in (1.95 m)	316 lb (143 kg)	32 1/8 in (0.82 m)	9 1/2 in (0.24 m)	6 ft 8 1/2 in (2.04 m)	5.22 s	1.85 s	3.05 s	4.60 s	7.48 s	29.0 in (0.74 m)	8 ft 7 in (2.62 m)	26 reps
All values from NFL Combine/Pro Day

Carmona was selected by the Tennessee Titans in the fifth round with the 142nd overall pick of the 2026 NFL draft.
