= Lolly (singer) =

English singer, dancer and TV presenter

- Also known as: Lolly
- Born: Anna Shantha Kumble; 27 June 1977 (age 49); Sutton Coldfield, Birmingham, England
- Occupations: Musician, TV presenter
- Instrument: Vocals
- Years active: 1998–2000, 2005, 2018–present (musician, actress, TV presenter)
- Label: Polydor

Lolly (born Anna Shantha Kumble (pronounced KUUM-blay, Kŭmblā); 27 June 1977, Sutton Coldfield) is a British singer, dancer and TV presenter.

== Early life ==
Kumble was born to Jaiker Kumble (who emigrated from India) and Barbara in Sutton Coldfield. She has a brother Paul, and a sister Jodie. Kumble attended The Shrubbery School, Highclare School and Plantsbrook School in Sutton Coldfield. She is a graduate of the London Studio Centre.

== Career ==
Kumble worked as a model before going into a pop career. Lolly arrived on the British pop music scene in 1999 with the release of her first single, "Viva La Radio". She released five top 20 singles and two albums over her two-year career in music. Her real name was released one letter at a time in Smash Hits magazine. After quitting her record label Polydor, Lolly reverted to her real name and began TV presenting, working for the BBC on programmes such as Xchange. She also works for Nickelodeon. Kumble also acted as a stand-in for presenter Anna Williamson some Saturday and Sunday mornings on now-axed kids show Toonattik on CITV. She has had roles in West End productions of Starlight Express at the Apollo Victoria Theatre and played Priscilla Presley in Elvis at the Prince of Wales Theatre. In July 2018, her first two albums My First Album and Pick 'n' Mix were released digitally. In October 2018, she released a new single, "Stay Young and Beautiful", her first in 18 years. In 2020, Lolly's follow-up single was titled "Paper Rain". In 2025 Lolly returned with her new "Only For Love" and in 2026 Lolly returned with her next single "We Can Do Anything" alongside Wilma and Bodacia. Lolly has another track called Up All Night which was included as an exclusive track with the Vinyl and CD and the Single will be released before the end of 2026.

=== Pantomime ===
Kumble has starred in a number of pantomimes, typically billed as "Anna Kumble (Lolly)". In 2002, she played Tinker Bell in Peter Pan at the Theatre Royal, Brighton. In 2004, she played the title role in Snow White and the Seven Dwarfs at the Derby Assembly Rooms. In 2006, Kumble starred as Alice Fitzwarren in Dick Whittington at The Playhouse in Weston-super-Mare. In 2009, Kumble again starred in Dick Whittington as Fairy Bowbells, this time at the Stag theatre, Kent.

In 2010, Kumble returned to Peter Pan, this time playing the role of Tiger Lily at the Lichfield Garrick Theatre. In December 2012, she appeared in Jack and the Beanstalk in Weymouth. In December 2018, she appeared in Cinderella as the Fairy Godmother in Telford. She returned to Telford in December 2022, where she appeared in Snow White as the Evil Queen.

== Personal life ==
Kumble has two children, a son Charlie and a daughter Belle.

== Discography ==
=== Albums ===
Year	Title	Chart positions
Year	Title	UK
1999	My First Album	21
2000	Pick 'n' Mix	80

=== Singles ===
Year	Single	Chart peak positions		Album
Year	Single	UK	AUS	Album
1999	"Viva La Radio"	7	—	My First Album / Pick 'n' Mix
1999	"Mickey"	4	66	My First Album / Pick 'n' Mix
1999	"Big Boys Don't Cry" / "Rockin' Robin"	10	—	My First Album / Pick 'n' Mix
2000	"Per Sempre Amore"	11	—	Pick 'n' Mix
2000	"Girls Just Wanna Have Fun"	14	—	Pick 'n' Mix
2018	"Stay Young and Beautiful"	—	—	Non-album singles
2020	"Paper Rain"	—	—	Non-album singles
