= Word of Mouth (Toni Basil album) =

Studio album by Toni Basil
- Released: May 22, 1981
- Recorded: 1981
- Genres: New wave; pop rock
- Length: 39:28
- Labels: Chrysalis (U.S.); Radialchoice (UK)
- Producers: Greg Mathieson; Trevor Veitch

Toni Basil chronology
Word of Mouth (1981)	Toni Basil (1983)

Singles from Word of Mouth
- 1. "Mickey" Released: January 3, 1982; 2. "Nobody" Released: 1982; 3. "Time After Time" / "You Gotta Problem" Released: 1982; 4. "Shoppin' from A to Z" Released: 1983

Professional ratings
Review scores
Source	Rating
AllMusic	3.5/5 stars
Christgau's Record Guide	B+

Word of Mouth is the debut studio album by American singer Toni Basil. It was first released in May 1981 in the United Kingdom and April 1982 in the United States. The album features the number-one worldwide hit "Mickey", as well as three covers of songs by Devo, who also performed on those three tracks ("Be Stiff", "Space Girls", which is a re-titled "Space Girl Blues", and "You Gotta Problem", which is a re-titled "Pity You"). The U.S. version of the album added the songs "Rock On" (a David Essex cover) and "Shoppin' from A to Z", deleting "Hanging Around". Word of Mouth was certified Gold by the RIAA. Basil also released a video album for Word of Mouth.

== Chart performance ==
The lead single "Mickey" became an international hit, earning a double platinum certification. The album, which was released shortly after, was also a success, peaking at number 22 on the US Billboard 200 and receiving a Gold certification. However, the following singles, "Nobody" in the UK and "Shoppin' from A to Z" in the US, both under-performed, which cut the album's success short. It also reached number 27 on the New Zealand albums chart.

== Track listing ==
=== U.S. LP ===
Side A
No.	Title	Writer(s)	Length
1.	"Mickey"	Mike Chapman; Nicky Chinn	4:12
2.	"Rock On"	David Essex	4:04
3.	"Shoppin' from A to Z"	Allee Willis; Bruce Roberts; Toni Basil	4:08
4.	"You Gotta Problem"	Mark Mothersbaugh	4:34
5.	"Be Stiff"	Gerald Casale; Bob Lewis	3:22

Side B
No.	Title	Writer(s)	Length
1.	"Nobody"	Paul Delph	4:00
2.	"Little Red Book"	Burt Bacharach; Hal David	4:04
3.	"Space Girls"	Casale	2:56
4.	"Thief on the Loose"	Basil; Greg Mathieson	3:50
5.	"Time After Time"	Nick Gilder; James McCullough	4:18

=== UK LP ===
Side A
No.	Title	Writer(s)	Length
1.	"Nobody"	Delph	4:03
2.	"Hanging Around"	Tony Conway	4:08
3.	"Thief on the Loose"	Basil; Mathieson	3:54
4.	"Time After Time"	Gilder; McCullough	4:23
5.	"Mickey"	Chapman; Chinn	4:15

Side B
No.	Title	Writer(s)	Length
1.	"Little Red Book"	Bacharach; David	4:07
2.	"Be Stiff"	Casale; Lewis	3:24
3.	"Space Girls"	Casale	3:00
4.	"You Gotta Problem"	Mothersbaugh	4:36

=== International cassette ===
Side A
No.	Title	Writer(s)	Length
1.	"Mickey"	Chapman; Chinn	4:15
2.	"Nobody"	Delph	4:03
3.	"Hanging Around"	Conway	4:08
4.	"Thief on the Loose"	Basil; Mathieson	3:54
5.	"Little Red Book"	Bacharach; David	4:07

Side B
No.	Title	Writer(s)	Length
1.	"Time After Time"	Gilder; McCullough	4:23
2.	"Be Stiff"	Casale; Lewis	3:24
3.	"Space Girls"	Casale	3:00
4.	"You Gotta Problem"	Mothersbaugh	4:36

== Personnel ==
- Toni Basil – vocals
- Rick Parnell, Alan Myers, Ed Greene, Mike Baird – drums
- Doug Lunn, Gerald Casale (credited as Jerry Casale) – bass
- Mike Chapman – synthesizer and keyboards on "Mickey"
- Dorsey High Cheerleaders, classes of 1980–81 – stomping and chanting on "Mickey"
- Greg Mathieson, Michael Boddicker, Mark Mothersbaugh, Paul Delph – synthesizer
- Bob Mothersbaugh, John Goodsall, Bob Casale, Richie Zito, Trevor Veitch, David Storrs – guitar
- Richard Greene – violin on "Rock On"
- Dan Wyman – synthesizer programming; vocoder on "Space Girls"
- Allee Willis, Bruce Roberts, Bob Esty – additional vocals
- The Alphabet Singers – additional backing vocals on "Shoppin' from A to Z"

Technical

- Produced by Greg Mathieson and Trevor Veitch
- John Michael Weaver, Joe Robb, Tony D'Amico, David Leonard – engineer
- Janet Levinson – design
- Steven Arnold – cover photography

== Charts ==
=== Weekly charts ===
Weekly chart performance
Chart (1982–1983)	Peak position
Australian Albums (Kent Music Report)	43
Canada Top Albums/CDs (RPM)	45
New Zealand Albums (RMNZ)	27
UK Albums (Official Charts)	15
US Billboard 200	22

=== Year-end charts ===
Year-end chart performance
Chart (1983)	Position
US Billboard 200	100

== Certifications ==
Certifications
Region	Certification	Certified units/sales
Canada (Music Canada)	Gold	50,000^{^}
United States (RIAA)	Gold	500,000^{^}
^{^} Shipments figures based on certification alone.
