= My First Album (Lolly album) =

Studio album by Lolly
- Released: 20 September 1999
- Genre: Bubblegum pop
- Length: 61:02
- Label: Polydor

Lolly chronology
My First Album (1999)	Pick 'n' Mix (2000)

Singles from My First Album
- 1. "Viva La Radio" Released: 28 June 1999; 2. "Mickey" Released: 6 September 1999; 3. "Big Boys Don't Cry" Released: 22 November 1999

My First Album is the debut album by English singer Lolly, released in 1999. All three singles from the album, "Viva La Radio", "Mickey" and "Big Boys Don't Cry" were top 10 hits in the UK. The album reached number 21 on the UK Albums Chart.

== Track listing ==
All songs written by the Dufflebag Boys (Mike Rose and Nick Foster), except as indicated.

1. "Viva la Radio" - 2:44
2. "Mickey" (Mike Chapman, Nicky Chinn) - 3:36
3. "Big Boys Don't Cry" - 3:23
4. "Kiss Kiss Boom Boom" - 3:01
5. "Dance in the Rain" - 3:01
6. "Can You Keep a Secret?" - 2:50
7. "Internet Love" - 2:57
8. "Happy" - 2:52
9. "Telephone Boy" - 2:10
10. "Do You Feel Like I Feel?" - 2:52
11. "Viva La Radio" (karaoke version) - 2:44
12. "Mickey" (karaoke version) (Chapman, Chinn) - 3:36
13. "Big Boys Don't Cry" (karaoke version) - 3:23
14. "Kiss Kiss Boom Boom" (karaoke version) - 3:01
15. "Dance in the Rain" (karaoke version) - 3:01
16. "Can You Keep a Secret?" (karaoke version) - 2:50
17. "Internet Love" (karaoke version) - 2:57
18. "Happy" (karaoke version) - 2:52
19. "Telephone Boy" (karaoke version) - 2:10
20. "Do You Feel Like I Feel?" (karaoke version) - 2:52

== Charts ==
Chart (1999)	Peak position
UK Albums (OCC)	21

== Certifications ==
Region	Certification	Certified units/sales
United Kingdom (BPI)	Gold	100,000^{^}
^{^} Shipments figures based on certification alone.
