= William Harrell Nellis =

World War II pilot for whom Nellis Air Force Base is named (1916–1944)

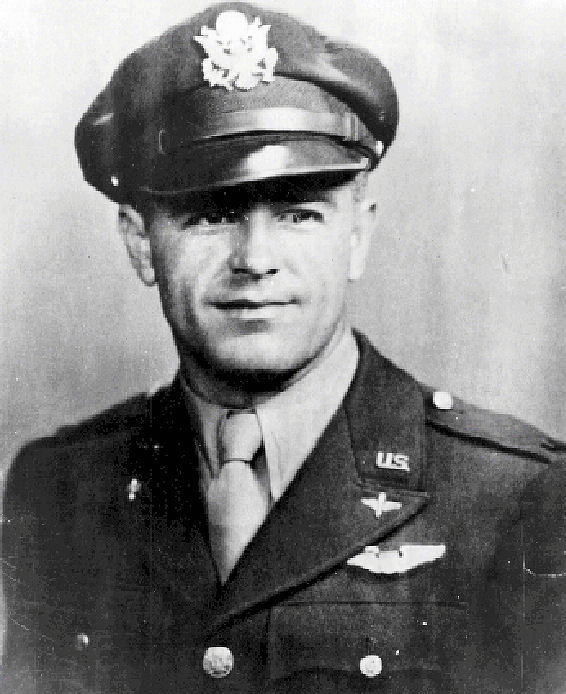
- Born: March 8, 1916; Santa Rita, New Mexico, U.S.
- Died: December 27, 1944 (aged 28); Winseler, Luxembourg
- Burial place: Henri-Chapelle American Cemetery and Memorial, Belgium
- Alma mater: Las Vegas High School
- Spouse(s): Shirley (Fletcher) Nellis Genstel (1921–2004)
- Children: 1 son, 1 daughter
- Military career
- Allegiance: United States
- Branch: United States Army Air Forces
- Service years: 1942–1944
- Rank: First Lieutenant
- Nickname: Billy
- Unit: 513th Fighter Squadron
- Conflicts: World War II: European theater Battle of the Bulge
- Awards: Legion of Merit (2); Distinguished Flying Cross (2)

William Harrell Nellis (March 8, 1916 – December 27, 1944) was a United States fighter pilot who flew 70 World War II combat missions. He was shot down three times, the last time fatally. On April 30, 1950, the Las Vegas Air Force Base in Nevada was renamed Nellis Air Force Base in his honor.

Soon after his birth in Santa Rita, New Mexico, Nellis and his parents, Cecil and Marguerite, moved to Searchlight, Nevada, and, when he was 13, to Las Vegas. Nellis graduated from Las Vegas High School; he did not go to college, but subsequently joined the Army Enlisted Reserve Corps on December 9, 1942, training in Albany, Georgia. He was commissioned a flight officer on January 7, 1944. and on July 9, Nellis was assigned to the 513th Fighter Squadron, in support of General George Patton's Third Army.

On December 27, 1944, flying a P-47 Thunderbolt during the Battle of the Bulge, he was shot down by ground fire while strafing a German convoy in Luxembourg. He was too low to bail out, and crashed near Winseler. Nellis's remains were recovered from his wrecked aircraft the following April. He was buried at Henri-Chapelle American Cemetery and Memorial near Liège, Belgium.
