= Bryan Harper (baseball) =

American baseball player (born 1989)

- Pitcher
- Born: December 29, 1989 (age 36); Las Vegas, Nevada, U.S.
- Bats: Left Throws: Left
- Stats at Baseball Reference

Bryan James Harper (born December 29, 1989) is an American former professional baseball pitcher. Harper spent eight seasons in the Washington Nationals organization. He is the older brother of Bryce Harper.

== Early life ==
Growing up in Las Vegas, Nevada, Harper played many sports, including basketball and football as well as baseball. His brother Bryce said that the reason he bats left-handed is because he always wanted to be like his older brother, who throws left-handed. The younger Harper said he tried throwing left-handed when he was young, but, being naturally right-handed, was terrible at it, so he settled for hitting from the left side instead.

== Baseball career ==
=== High school and college ===
Harper attended Las Vegas High School. He was drafted in the 2008 Major League Baseball draft in the 31st round by the Washington Nationals, but he chose not to sign.

After graduating from high school, Harper briefly relocated out-of-state to pitch for the Cal State Northridge Matadors before transferring back to Las Vegas to attend the College of Southern Nevada. The Harper brothers were teammates on the Las Vegas High baseball team as well as at Southern Nevada, a junior college that Bryce attended early so that he could sign with a major league team as quickly as possible. At the time, Bryce was a catcher, so the Harper brothers would often form the Coyotes' battery. Coyotes baseball manager Tim Chambers later praised Harper's work ethic and professionalism in spite of being overshadowed by his younger brother. Harper acknowledged in a 2015 interview that he has "never been the uber-prospect like my brother has", but he said he focused on his pitching and was consistently able to get batters out.

Harper pitched in the 2010 JUCO World Series, with Bryce as his catcher, earning the win in an 18-1 blowout of Faulkner State Community College in the second round of the tournament. After Bryce was ejected and suspended later in the tournament, Harper got to pitch in an elimination game versus Iowa Western Community College. While the Coyotes led into the ninth inning, the team's closer gave up a walk-off home run, ending their playoff run.

The brothers spent just one year together at Southern Nevada before Bryce was drafted in the 2010 Major League Baseball (MLB) draft. Although Chambers hoped the elder Harper would be picked up by the Nationals in a later round of the draft, believing he could help his younger brother make the transition to professional baseball, the Chicago Cubs selected him in the 27th round.

While Bryce, having been taken by the Nationals with the first overall draft pick, chose to sign and become a member of the Nationals organization, Harper declined to sign with the Cubs. He instead transferred to the University of South Carolina, where he pitched in relief for the Gamecocks. He won the 2011 College World Series with South Carolina. During that 2011 season, he recorded a 5.40 ERA over 18 1/3 innings. He later admitted he "didn't pitch the best" as a Gamecock, but he said the additional year of college helped with his maturity.

=== Washington Nationals ===
The Nationals again drafted Harper, in the 30th round of the 2011 MLB draft. Feeling he was ready at that point to play professionally, he signed, joining his brother in the Nationals organization.

While Bryce, who converted from catching to playing in the outfield, shot through the Nationals organization and made his major league debut in April 2012, Harper's progression through the minors was slower. He spent the 2012 season with the Low-A Auburn Doubledays and the 2013 season with the Single-A Hagerstown Suns, working exclusively out of the bullpen. Starting in the 2014 season, he began to advance into the high minor leagues, ending the year with the Double-A Harrisburg Senators and appearing briefly in the 2015 season with the Triple-A Syracuse Chiefs, the top level of the minors. After spending the first two months of the 2016 season back in Double-A and recording a 1.50 ERA over 24 innings pitched, including 16 out of 20 scoreless appearances, Harper was promoted again to Triple-A in June.

After pitching to a 2.95 ERA over 21 1/3 innings with the Chiefs in 2016, Harper was shut down in August with a forearm strain. He was ruled out for the season, ending any chance of being called up to the Nationals that year. In November, he underwent Tommy John surgery, which likely ruled him out for the 2017 season, as well. Due to his injury, the Nationals did not add him to their 40-man roster after the 2016 season, as had been previously expected.

Harper re-signed with the Nationals after the 2017 season and was invited to major league spring training in 2018 for the first time, vying for a spot in the Washington bullpen.

Harper spent the 2018 regular season with Harrisburg, making 44 relief appearances and compiling a 3.69 ERA with 38 strikeouts and 4 saves across 46 1/3 innings pitched. He elected free agency following the season on November 2, 2018.

=== Lancaster Barnstormers ===
On March 22, 2019, Harper signed with the Lancaster Barnstormers of the independent Atlantic League of Professional Baseball. He made 37 appearances for the Barnstormers, posting an 0-5 record and 5.17 ERA with 32 strikeouts across 31 1/3 innings pitched. Harper became a free agent following the season.

== Pitching style ==
At 6-foot-5, Harper is two inches taller than his younger brother Bryce. Unlike Bryce, he throws left-handed. While his fastball velocity sat in the mid-80s when he was pitching for South Carolina in 2011, he was throwing in the low 90s with the Syracuse Chiefs in 2016 prior to undergoing Tommy John surgery. His pitching arsenal included a fastball, curveball, slider, and changeup.
