= Las Vegas High School =

- LVHS in 2009

Location
- 6500 E. Sahara Avenue; Las Vegas, Nevada; United States; 36.146°N 115.032°W

Information
- Type: Public High School
- Established: Original campus: 1930; 96 years ago Current campus: 1993; 33 years ago
- School district: Clark County S.D.
- Principal: Ray Ortiz
- Teaching staff: 108.00 (FTE)
- Grades: 9–12
- Enrollment: 2,552 (2023–2024)
- Student to teacher ratio: 23.63
- Colors: Black and red
- Athletics conference: Sunrise 5AAA Region
- Team name: Wildcats
- Rivals: Eldorado, Rancho
- Publication: Hollywood
- Yearbook: Echo
- Website: www.lvwildcats.com

Las Vegas High School is a public high school in Sunrise Manor, Nevada, and part of the Clark County School District. Established in 1905, it is the oldest high school in the Las Vegas area. The school moved to its current campus on East Sahara Avenue in 1993, while its former downtown campus, known for its Art Deco architecture, was converted into the Las Vegas Academy of International Studies and Performing Arts. The school's mascot is the wildcat, and its colors are red and black.

== History ==
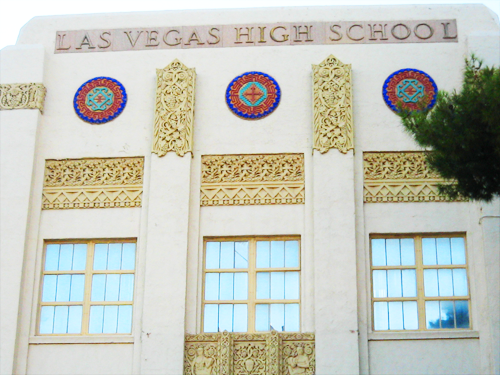
The original campus of Las Vegas High School in 2006, now the campus for the Las Vegas Academy of the Arts.

Las Vegas High School's original campus was constructed as a tent near the cottonwoods near north Creek of town for the 1905 school year. In 1911, high school classes were moved to the Clark County School at Fourth Street and Bridger Avenue, the precursor to Las Vegas High. Seventeen students were enrolled.

On December 17, 1917 a new Las Vegas High School was built at a cost of $42,500, opening at Fourth Street and Clark Avenue with 51 students. This campus was destroyed by a fire on May 11, 1934. Previously, a new high school was built in 1930, which caused controversy at the time due to its location. In the early 1930s, the new high school was considered distant from the rest of the town and was a commute for some students. The school originally had three buildings: the tri-level Main building on the corner of 7th and Bridger, the Gymnasium, and a third building that originally housed wood shops and vocational classes, and later government classes. The Shop building was torn down in 1969. Las Vegas High School is now a landmark in Las Vegas, as it represents the best of the Art-Deco Style Architecture of the 1930s that still stands in the city. The school's outer appearance has been maintained, but the interior has been changed since its original construction. Lieutenant William Harrell Nellis, for whom Nellis Air Force Base is named, is an alumnus of Las Vegas High School.

During the late 1980s, Clark County School District opened a new, larger campus for Las Vegas High School on the east side of Clark County. The original Las Vegas High School campus now holds Las Vegas Academy of the Arts, which opened in 1993.

== Athletics ==
Las Vegas High School's athletics teams are known as the Wildcats and participate in the 5A Division III Southern sports division. The Wildcats athletics programs are some of the best in the state and have won numerous championships with several in football, including the 1944 team which went all eight games without giving up a single point. The football team also has two historic rivalries, the Battle of Sunrise Mountain against Eldorado High School, which began in 1993 (and coined by a former 1985 graduate of Eldorado High School) and the Bone Game against Rancho High School, the latter of which is the oldest football rivalry in the state of Nevada. Las Vegas has won 28 consecutive games against Rancho, dating back to 1996.

=== Nevada Interscholastic Activities Association State Championships ===
- Baseball – 1968, 1971, 2024
- Basketball (Men's) – 1944, 1945, 1949, 1953, 1958, 1960, 1965, 1966, 1967, 1972, 1974, 1976
- Basketball (Women's) – 1978, 2023
- Bowling (Men's) – 2017
- Football – 1931, 1932, 1933, 1934, 1938, 1944, 1945, 1947, 1951, 1953, 1954, 1957, 1959, 2001, 2005, 2006
- Golf – 1966, 1970
- Soccer (Boys) – 2008, 2009, 2018
- Softball – 1982
- Volleyball (Boys) – 2005, 2008
- Wrestling – 1985, 2001, 2002, 2010, 2011
- Track & Field – 1930, 1933, 1939, 1941, 1946, 1947, 1948, 1949, 1953, 1954, 1955, 1956, 1957, 1958, 1959, 1962, 1963, 1965, 1972, 1973, 1993

=== Nevada Interscholastic Activities Association State Runners-Up ===
- Basketball (Men’s) - 1970, 1973, 1994, 1998
- Basketball (Women’s) - 1991, 2022
- Bowling (Men's) – 2014
- Flag Football - 2020
- Football – 2003, 2004
- Softball – 2007
- Track and Field (Men's) – 1999
- Volleyball (Men's) – 2014, 2017
- Wrestling – 1988, 1991, 2005, 2009, 2026

=== Nevada Interscholastic Activities Association Individual State Champions ===
- Bowling (Women's)(1) – 2014 Gabriella Weis
- Golf (Men's)(1) – 2009 Ray Gillup
- Track and Field (Men's) – 1998 Anthony Park, 1999 John Pollard, 2000 Anthony Parker, 2002 Cory Williams, 2009 Aaron Adkins, 2012 Tony Verdugo, 2016 Tre James

Relay – 2001 and 2015 - 400x2 (Elias Miller, Tre' James, Kalin Quailis, Eric Williams)

- Track and Field (Women's) – 1998 Lillie Williams

Relay – 2007

- Wrestling(48) - 1979 Adam Hilty, Ben Viray, 1980 Ben Viray, 1983 Tim Monahan, 1985 Mike Brewer, Joel Collins, Dave Rumfield, 1988 Simon Gutierrez, Joey Vidana, 1989 Mihn Nguyen, Scott Hocker, 1990 Frank Quintana, Damon Ruemmele, 1991 Pete Rayner, Rick Villalobos, Damon Ruemmele, 1996 Kelly Brinkerhoff, 1998 Eddy Gifford, 1999 Ricardo Osario, 2001 Greg Gifford, 2002 Chris Gifford, Greg Gifford, 2003 Chris Gifford, 2004 Chris Gifford, 2005 Nick Ruggiero, Zach Brewer, 2006 Mike Ruggiero, 2007 Jarell Price, Zach Hocker, 2009 Madison Hales, 2010 Alex Aniciete, Napoleon Aniciete, Trey McElhaney, 2011 Nathan Garcia, Alex Aniciete, Napoleon Aniciete, 2013 Christopher Caday, Alex Aniciete, 2014 Antonio Jauregui, 2015 Antonio Saldate, 2016 Antonio Saldate, 2017 Mauricio Jimenez, 2018 Antonio Saldate, Mauricio Jimenez, 2026 Kainoa Lopez

NIAA REGION CHAMPIONS - (1999–Present)

Basketball (Men's) - 2000, 2001, 2002

Basketball (Women's) - 2003

Bowling (Men's) - 2014, 2017

Football - 1999, 2001, 2003, 2004, 2005, 2006, 2007, 2008

Track and Field (Men's) - 2000

Soccer (Men's) - 1999, 2006, 2009, 2018

Softball - 2005, 2007

Volleyball (Men's) - 2005, 2010, 2014, 2015, 2017

Wrestling - 2001, 2002, 2003, 2004, 2005, 2006, 2007, 2008, 2009, 2010, 2026

== Notable alumni ==
- Toni Basil (1961), pop singer, Best known for her songs Mickey and Over my Head. Basil wore her Las Vegas High cheerleader uniform in the music video for Mickey.
- Sal Bernal (2011), Major League Soccer player
- Tyler Bey (born 1998), basketball player in the Israeli Basketball Premier League, a 2020 NBA draft prospect
- Bill Boyd (1949), businessman and co-founder of Boyd Gaming
- Richard Bryan (1955)
- Gabriel Campisi (1986)
- Fernando Carmona (2021), college football guard for the San Jose State Spartans and the Arkansas Razorbacks
- Brian Cram (1955), Clark County School Superintendent
- Ricardo Dominguez (1978), co-founder of Electronic Disturbance Theater and professor at University of California, San Diego
- Erick Fedde (2011), Major League Baseball player
- Lloyd D. George (1948), United States federal judge, namesake of Lloyd D. George Federal Courthouse
- Herculez Gomez (2000), soccer player
- Bryce Harper (dropped out in 2008 to pursue a GED), Major League Baseball player
- Sean Kazmar (2002), major league baseball player
- Barbara Knudson, actress
- Raúl Labrador (1985), congressman from Idaho
- William Harrell Nellis (1934), namesake of Nellis Air Force Base
- Marc Ratner (1963)
- Sig Rogich (1962)
- Larry Ruvo (1964)
- Jack Lund Schofield (1941), Nevada state legislator
- Dana Snyder (1992), stand-up comedian, actor, voice actor, and producer
- Billy Winn (2007), professional football player
- Bruce Woodbury (1962)
