= Nobody (Toni Basil song) =

Single by Toni Basil

from the album Word of Mouth
- Released: 1982
- Recorded: 1981
- Genre: Rock; power pop; new wave
- Label: A&M
- Songwriter: Paul Delph
- Producer: Mike Chapman

Toni Basil singles chronology
"Mickey" (1981)	"Nobody" (1982)	"Time After Time" / "You Gotta Problem" (1982)

"Nobody" is a song by Toni Basil, released in 1982 as the second single from her debut album, Word of Mouth. It was released in the UK only. "Nobody" reached a peak position of No. 52 on the UK Singles Chart.

The song is a cover of the minor 1981 hit "Don't Want No-Body" by Jürgen "J.D." Drews (No. 79 on the Billboard Hot 100).

== Music video ==
A music video was made for the song. The visuals of the music video were inspired by the 1951 film version of A Streetcar Named Desire and the 1948 film version of The Red Shoes.

The video begins with a very upset Basil walking around appearing chroma keyed over a blue sky background, then emerges into a black background. Then, she is seen in a bedroom, taking her frustration out on various furniture items in her bedroom, such as a bed pillow and some cosmetics. Then, flashback scenes of Basil and a man (possibly Mickey) appear in the background while she sings. Afterwards, she dances while the blue sky background changes from various colors, and then black. The music video ends with the exterior of an animated house while Basil is singing inside the window and eventually passes out.
