= Toni Basil =

American singer (born 1943)

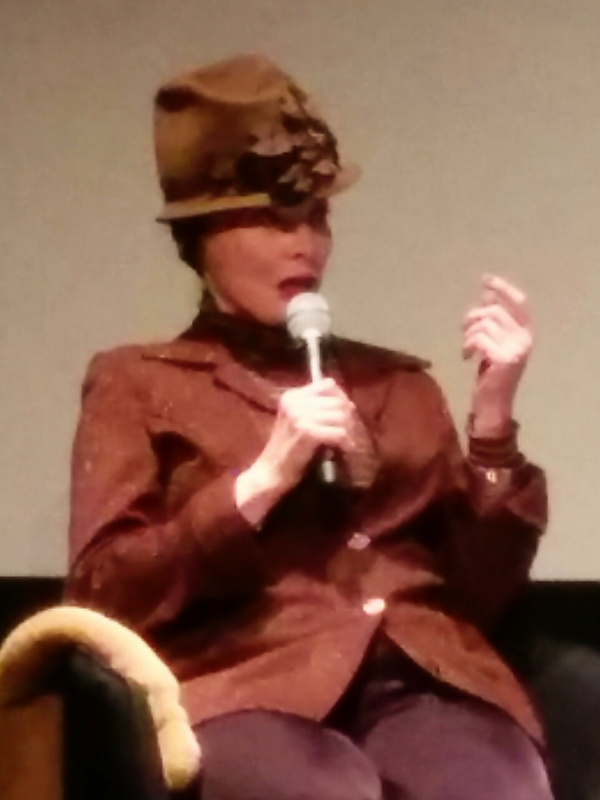
- Basil in 2016

Background information
- Born: Antonia Christina Basilotta; September 22, 1943 (age 83); Philadelphia, Pennsylvania, U.S.
- Education: Las Vegas High School (graduate)
- Genre: New wave
- Occupations: Singer; dancer; actress; choreographer; film director
- Years active: 1964–present
- Labels: Chrysalis; Virgin
- Website: tonibasil.net

Antonia Christina Basilotta (born September 22, 1943), better known by her stage name Toni Basil, is an American singer, choreographer, dancer, actress, and director. Her 1982 single, "Mickey" (a cover of "Kitty"), topped the charts in the US, Canada and Australia and entered the top 10 of several other international charts.

== Early life and education ==
Basil was born Antonia Christina Basilotta on September 22, 1943, in Philadelphia. Her father led an orchestra, and her mother performed in vaudeville. Basil has Italian ancestry.

She grew up in Las Vegas, where her father moved the family for his work when she was a child. In 1961, Basil graduated from Las Vegas High School, where she was head cheerleader. Already known by the nickname Toni, she later incorporated her cheerleading experience into her dance career, including her choreography/performance of "Mickey". The cheerleader uniform that she wore in the video was the one she wore in high school.

== Career ==
=== Dance career ===
Also in 1964, she assisted choreographer David Winters for Steve Binder's concert film T.A.M.I. Show. T.A.M.I. Show would go on to be deemed "culturally, historically, or aesthetically significant" by the United States Library of Congress and selected for preservation in 2006 in the National Film Registry.

In 1968, Princess Grace of Monaco's television special Monte Carlo: C'est La Rose premiered. In it, Basil accompanies lead dancer and choreographer Winters; he explained that he brought her and fellow dancer Anita Mann because they were his best students.

In addition, Basil is credited with bringing street dance to prominence, as a founding member and manager of The Lockers. A 2012 Dance Magazine article cited Basil as the pioneer in merging ballet with street dance for a piece she choreographed for Saturday Night Live, "Swan Lake" in 1978.

Basil created collaboratively with English singer/songwriter David Bowie as the primary choreographer for Bowie's Diamond Dogs Tour and Glass Spider Tour in 1974 and 1987 respectively. Basil also co-directed the music video for the Talking Heads music video "Once in a Lifetime" (1981) and choreographed lead singer David Byrne's spasmodic dance moves as seen in the video.

Basil choreographed the film Once Upon a Time in Hollywood at the age of 75, and appeared in an uncredited cameo, wearing her trademark fedora and dancing with Margot Robbie on the Pan Am flight. Basil was surprised by Tarantino's detailed knowledge of both 1960s dances and her previous work, and said she personally knew two of the real-life people who are portrayed in the film: Sharon Tate and Jay Sebring, who were both killed in the Tate–LaBianca murders.

=== Music career ===
Basil's recording career began in 1966 with a single for A&M Records, which was the title song of the short film Breakaway by artist Bruce Conner. The B-side was "I'm 28" written by Graham Gouldman, who later co-founded 10cc. Basil sang, solo, the swinging jazz number "Wham Rebop Boom Bam" in the first season of Saturday Night Live for the January 17, 1976, show with Buck Henry as host. Basil sold out solo shows at The Roxy in Los Angeles in June 1976, and sang the song on The Merv Griffin Show. She and The Lockers appeared on Saturday Night Live during the first season and also in later seasons of the show, as a singer and filmmaker, to perform in her urban style Swan Lake. She was signed to Warner Bros. Records at some point in 1976, but never released any material for the label.

In 1982, her single "Mickey" achieved international success. The song is a cover of "Kitty", a 1979 release by the UK band Racey, written by Nicky Chinn and Mike Chapman and produced by the latter. The original song did not include the "Oh Mickey, you're so fine" chant, which Basil added. The video was conceived, directed, and choreographed by Basil for the UK-based label Radialchoice, before the inception of MTV in July 1981. Issued on Chrysalis Records in September 1982 in the US, the song knocked Lionel Richie's "Truly" from No. 1 on the Billboard Hot 100 in December. It topped the chart in Canada where it was issued by Virgin Records. The 45 was quickly certified Gold and in early 1983 reached Platinum status for sales of over 2 million copies in the United States alone. The music video for "Mickey" was one of the most popular early MTV videos. In the video, Basil wore her head cheerleader uniform from Las Vegas High School from which she graduated.

During an interview on VH1's "100 Greatest Songs of The 80's", Basil said that she still owns the same cheerleader sweater she wore in the video. In 2009, VH1 ranked "Mickey" Number 6 on its list of the 100 Greatest One Hit Wonders of the '80s. In 2017, she launched an unsuccessful lawsuit against the makers of South Park over their use of the song in parodying Barack Obama's 2008 election win.

For television, Basil has appeared as an actress and featured singer/dancer in many television shows and specials. She co-directed and choreographed two BBC specials with Alan Walsh and Ken Stephenson called "Toni Basil Tape 1" and "Toni Basil Tape 2".

=== Filmmaking and music videos ===
Basil's Word of Mouth video album was nominated for both a Grammy Award and an MTV Video Music Award. Her late 1960s 8 mm and 16 mm films toured the U.S. with the show "Semina Culture: Wallace Berman and His Circle" in 2007.

== Awards and accolades ==
Basil received Emmy Award recognition for Outstanding Achievement in Choreography for The Smothers Brothers Comedy Hour in 1988, including a nomination and win listed by the Television Academy. Her other listed honors include Hip Hop International's Living Legend Award, two MTV Award nominations, four American Choreography Award nominations and two wins, including Lifetime Achievement Innovator, and the Los Angeles Theater Ovation Street Dance Award.

Basil's exhibitions include at the Museum of Modern Art (Videos), and at the Santa Monica Museum of Art (Short Films). She has received platinum and gold discs in the US, United Kingdom, Australia, Canada, Philippines, and France. Her single "Mickey" was installed in the Rock and Roll Hall of Fame as one of the groundbreaking singles of the 1980s.

She was given a tribute at The Carnival: Choreographer's Ball, Monsters of Hip-Hop Masters of Movement, and in Portraits of America's Great Choreographers. She was featured in the Museum of Modern Art Calendar of Artists, and on the cover of Dance Magazine.

On January 25, 2012, Basil presented The Electric Boogaloos with a Lifetime Achievement Award at the 13th anniversary show of The Carnival: Choreographer's Ball for their role in popularizing dance styles such as popping and electric boogie.

In 2023, Basil was inducted into the Women Songwriters Hall of Fame.

== Filmography ==
Year	Title	Role	Notes	Refs.
1964	Viva Las Vegas	Dancer in Red Dress (What'd I Say)	Uncredited	
1964	Robin and the 7 Hoods	Flapper	Uncredited	
1964	Pajama Party	Pajama Girl No. 15		
1964	T.A.M.I. Show	Herself; Go-Go Dancer	Documentary; Uncredited	
1965	Village of the Giants	Red		
1966	Breakaway	Dancer	Short	
1968	Head	Daddy's Song Dancer	Uncredited	
1969	Sweet Charity	Dancer	Uncredited	
1969	Easy Rider	Mary		
1970	Myra Breckinridge	Cigarette Girl	Uncredited	
1970	Five Easy Pieces	Terry Grouse		
1971	The Last Movie	Rose		
1972	Greaser's Palace	Indian Girl		
1976	Won Ton Ton, the Dog Who Saved Hollywood	Awards Ceremony Guest	Uncredited	
1976	Mother, Jugs & Speed	Addict		
1976	Citizen Soldier			
1988	Slaughterhouse Rock	Sammy Mitchell		
1988	Angel III: The Final Chapter	Hillary		
1988	Glass Spider	Choreographer		
1990	Rockula	Phoebe		
1990	Pacific Palisades	Désirée		
1990	Catchfire		Uncredited	
1990	Eating	Jackie		
2001	Legally Blonde	Choreographer	"Bend and Snap" sequence	

== Discography ==
=== Studio albums ===
Title	Album details	Peak chart positions					Certifications
Title	Album details	US	AUS	CAN	NZ	UK	Certifications
Word of Mouth	Released: 1981 (UK), 1982 (US); Formats: LP, cassette; Label: Chrysalis	22	43	45	27	15	RIAA: Gold; MC: Gold
Toni Basil	Released: 1983; Formats: LP, cassette; Label: Chrysalis	—	—	—	—	—	

=== Compilation albums ===
Title	Album details
The Best of Toni Basil: Mickey & Other Love Songs	Released: 1994; Formats: CD; Label: Razor & Tie
The Best of Toni Basil	Released: 1994; Formats: CD, cassette; Label: Tring International PLC
The Best of Toni Basil: Mickey... And Other Greatest Hits	Released: 1994; Formats: CD; Label: Form Records
Mickey!: The Best of Toni Basil	Released: 1994; Formats: CD, cassette; Label: Hallmark Records
The Very Best of Toni Basil	Released: 1997; Formats: CD; Label: Emporio
Oh Mickey!	Released: 2000; Formats: CD; Label: Snapper Music

=== Singles ===
Title	Year	Peak chart positions										Certifications	Album
Title	Year	US	US Dance	AUS	CAN	BEL (FL)	GER	IRE	NLD	NZ	UK	Certifications	Album
"Breakaway"	1966	—	—	—	—	—	—	—	—	—	—		—N/a
"Mickey"	1982	1	3	1	1	39	69	3	39	2	2	RIAA: Platinum; ARIA: Gold; BPI: Gold; MC: 2× Platinum	Word of Mouth
"Nobody"	1982	—	—	—	—	—	—	—	—	—	52		Word of Mouth
"Time After Time" / "You Gotta Problem"	1982	—	—	—	—	—	—	—	—	—	—		Word of Mouth
"Shoppin' from A to Z"	1983	77	—	—	—	—	—	—	—	—	—		Word of Mouth
"Street Beat"	1983	—	63	—	—	—	—	—	—	—	—		Toni Basil
"Over My Head"	1983	81	4	—	—	—	—	—	—	—	—		Toni Basil
"Suspense"	1984	—	8	—	—	—	—	—	—	—	—		Toni Basil
"Do You Wanna Dance"	1984	—	—	—	—	—	—	—	—	—	—		Toni Basil
"—" denotes a recording that did not chart or was not released in that territory.

== Awards and nominations ==
Year	Awards	Work	Category	Result	Refs.
1984	MTV Video Music Awards	Over My Head	Best Choreography	Nominated	
1984	Grammy Awards	Word of Mouth	Best Video Album	Nominated	

== Works cited ==
- Binder, Steve (1964). T.A.M.I. Show (DVD). Shout Factory. Barcode: 8 26664 11742 4.
- Winters, David (2018). Tough guys do dance. Pensacola, Florida: Indigo River Publishing. ISBN 978-1-948080-27-9.
