= Over My Head (Toni Basil song) =

Single by Toni Basil

from the album Toni Basil
- Released: 1983
- Recorded: Radialchoice/Chrysalis
- Genre: Rock; power pop; new wave
- Label: A&M
- Songwriters: Franne Golde, Sue Shifrin
- Producer: Richie Zito

Toni Basil singles chronology
"Shoppin' from A to Z" (1983)	"Over My Head" (1983)	"Street Beat" (1984)

"Over My Head" is a song by American singer Toni Basil. It was featured on her self-titled 1983 album, and reached number 81 on the Billboard Hot 100 and number 4 on the US Dance chart.

== Release ==
"Over My Head" was the second single from Toni Basil's 1983 album Toni Basil. The song was released as a 12" record by Chrysalis and Virgin Records. The song was also featured on her 1994 greatest hits compilation The Best of Toni Basil: Mickey & Other Love Songs.

== Music video ==
A music video for the song was released, directed by Basil and Michelle Simmons.

=== Synopsis ===
The video starts with Basil dancing in front of several paperback mystery novels, before being zapped into one of the books. She is suddenly featured in a dark room, clad in vampire-like fashion. She then appears on the cover of another mystery novel, before she is shown stuck on train tracks as a train flies over her. The train suddenly becomes a plane. Basil finally escapes the books and continues dancing in front of them.

=== Accolades ===
The video was nominated for "Best Choreography" at the first MTV Music Video Awards, in 1984. The video lost, however, to Michael Jackson's "Thriller."

== Commercial performance ==
The song reached number 81 on the Billboard Hot 100, spending a total of 6 weeks on the chart; it was her final single to reach the Hot 100. The song also went to number 4 on the US Dance chart. "Over My Head" was the final charting single that Basil's record label, Radial Choice, had before folding in 1984.

== Charts ==
Chart (1984)	Peak position
US Billboard Hot 100	81
US Dance Songs	4
