= Bryce Harper =

American baseball player (born 1992)

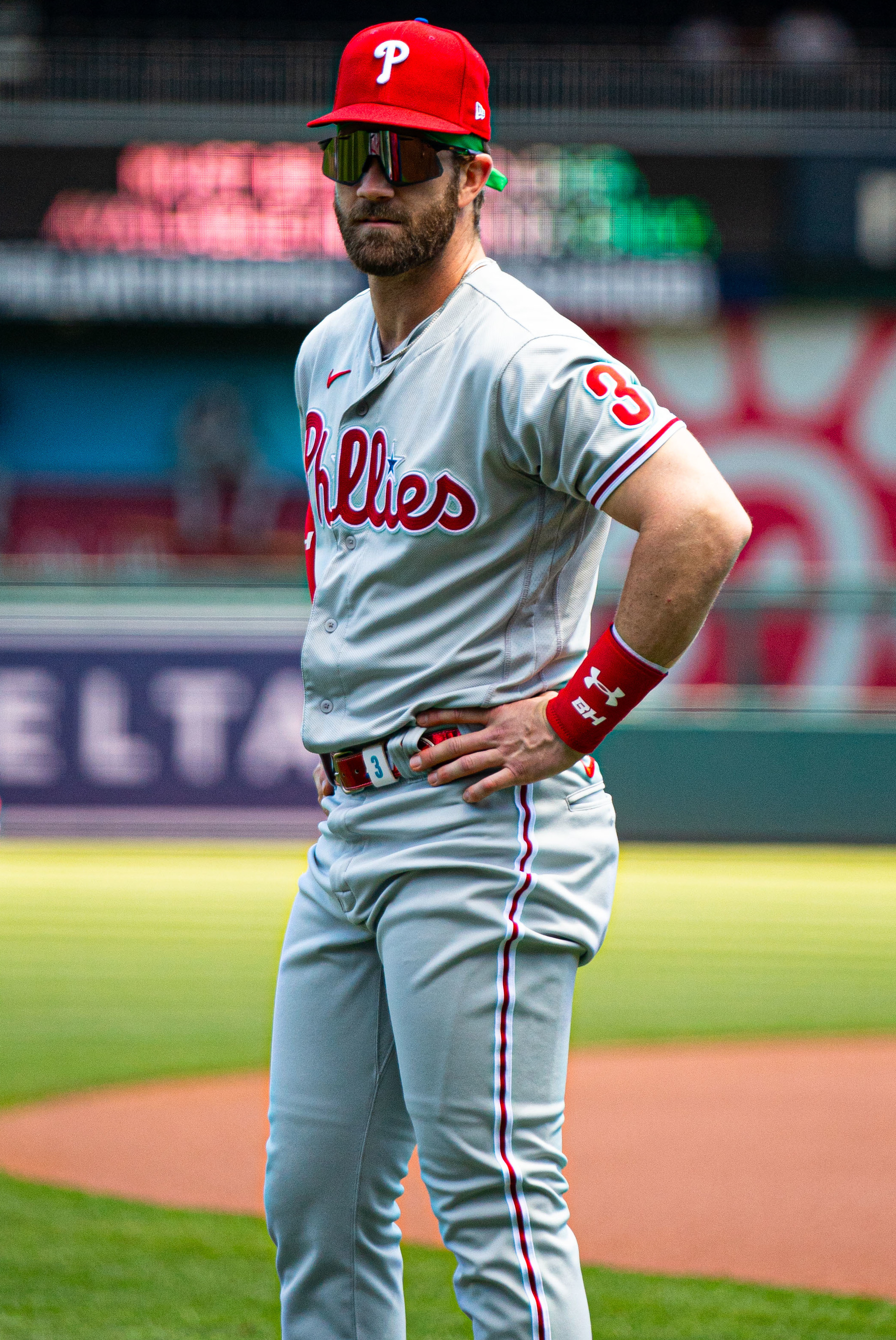
- Harper with the Philadelphia Phillies in 2021

Philadelphia Phillies – No. 3
- First baseman / Outfielder
- Born: October 16, 1992 (age 34); Las Vegas, Nevada, U.S.
- Bats: Left Throws: Right

MLB debut
- April 28, 2012, for the Washington Nationals

MLB statistics (through 2026 season)
- Batting average: .279
- Home runs: 392
- Runs batted in: 1,138
- Stats at Baseball Reference

Teams
- Washington Nationals (2012–2018); Philadelphia Phillies (2019–present)

Career highlights and awards
- 9× All-Star (2012, 2013, 2015–2018, 2022, 2024, 2026); 2× NL MVP (2015, 2021); All-MLB First Team (2021); NL Rookie of the Year (2012); NLCS MVP (2022); 4× Silver Slugger Award (2015, 2021, 2023, 2024); 2× NL Hank Aaron Award (2015, 2021); NL home run leader (2015 (Note: Tied with Nolan Arenado of the Colorado Rockies.)); Golden Spikes Award (2010)
Medals
Men's baseball
Representing United States
World Baseball Classic
| Silver medal – second place | 2026 Miami | Team |

Bryce Aron Max Harper (born October 16, 1992) is an American professional baseball first baseman and outfielder for the Philadelphia Phillies of Major League Baseball (MLB). He has previously played in MLB for the Washington Nationals.

One of the most heavily touted draft prospects in recent history, Harper has been cited as a "five-tool player." He left Las Vegas High School after his sophomore year so that he could attend the College of Southern Nevada, where he won the 2010 Golden Spikes Award. The Nationals selected Harper as the first overall pick in the 2010 MLB draft. He made his MLB debut with the Nationals on April 28, 2012, at 19 years old. Harper was selected for the 2012 All-Star Game, becoming the youngest position player (19 years, 268 days old on the day of the game) to play in an All-Star Game, and the second youngest overall (pitcher Dwight Gooden was 19 years, 237 days old when he played in the 1984 All-Star Game).

Harper won the National League (NL) Rookie of the Year Award in 2012 and tied for the NL lead in home runs in 2015. He was named the NL Most Valuable Player for 2015 by unanimous decision of the Baseball Writers' Association of America; at age 23, he was the youngest MLB player to win the award. As a free agent during the 2018–19 offseason, he signed a 13-year, $330 million contract with the Phillies, the richest contract in the history of North American sports at the time, which was eclipsed shortly thereafter by Mike Trout, and by several others later on. He won his second NL MVP award in 2021 with the Phillies. The next season, he helped lead the Phillies to their first postseason appearance in 11 years, and was instrumental in helping the team win its first pennant since 2009, winning the NLCS MVP in the process. Since April 2022, Harper transitioned from playing as an outfielder to a first baseman.

== Early life ==
Harper attended Las Vegas High School in Las Vegas, Nevada. In May 2009, Sports Illustrated featured Harper in a cover story, comparing him with LeBron James by similarly calling him his sport's "Chosen One". That same spring, he won Baseball America's high school player of the year award. Harper grew up a New York Yankees fan.

== College career ==
Harper dropped out of high school after completing his sophomore year and earned his GED in October 2009, reclassifying and making him eligible earlier for the Major League Baseball (MLB) draft in June 2010.

For the 2010 college season, 17-year-old Harper enrolled at the College of Southern Nevada of the Scenic West Athletic Conference (SWAC) in the National Junior College Athletic Association (NJCAA), where he was a catcher. His older brother Bryan, who had been his teammate at Las Vegas High School, was one of the Southern Nevada Coyotes' starting pitchers, and the brothers often worked as a battery. An advantage for Harper in his eventual transition to his MLB career was that the SWAC, like MLB, uses wooden bats in conference play. In 66 games, he hit 31 home runs with 98 RBIs, hitting .443 with a .526 OBP, and a .987 SLG. Harper's 31 home runs in 2010 broke the school's previous record of 12, and he was named the 2010 SWAC Player of the Year.

In the Western district finals of the 2010 NJCAA World Series, Harper went 6-for-7 with five RBIs and hit for the cycle. The next day, in a doubleheader, he went 2-for-5 with a three-run double in the first game. In the second game, he went 6-for-6 with four home runs, a triple, and a double.

On June 2 that year, Harper was ejected from a National Junior College World Series game by home plate umpire Don Gilmore for disputing a called third strike. Harper drew a line in the dirt with his bat as he left the plate, presumably to show where he thought the pitch was. It was Harper's second ejection of the year and resulted in a two-game suspension. The suspension ended his amateur career, and Southern Nevada lost the game from which Harper was ejected. With Harper suspended, the team also lost their next game, which eliminated them from the tournament. Harper won the 2010 Golden Spikes Award, given to the best amateur baseball player in the nation.

== Professional career ==
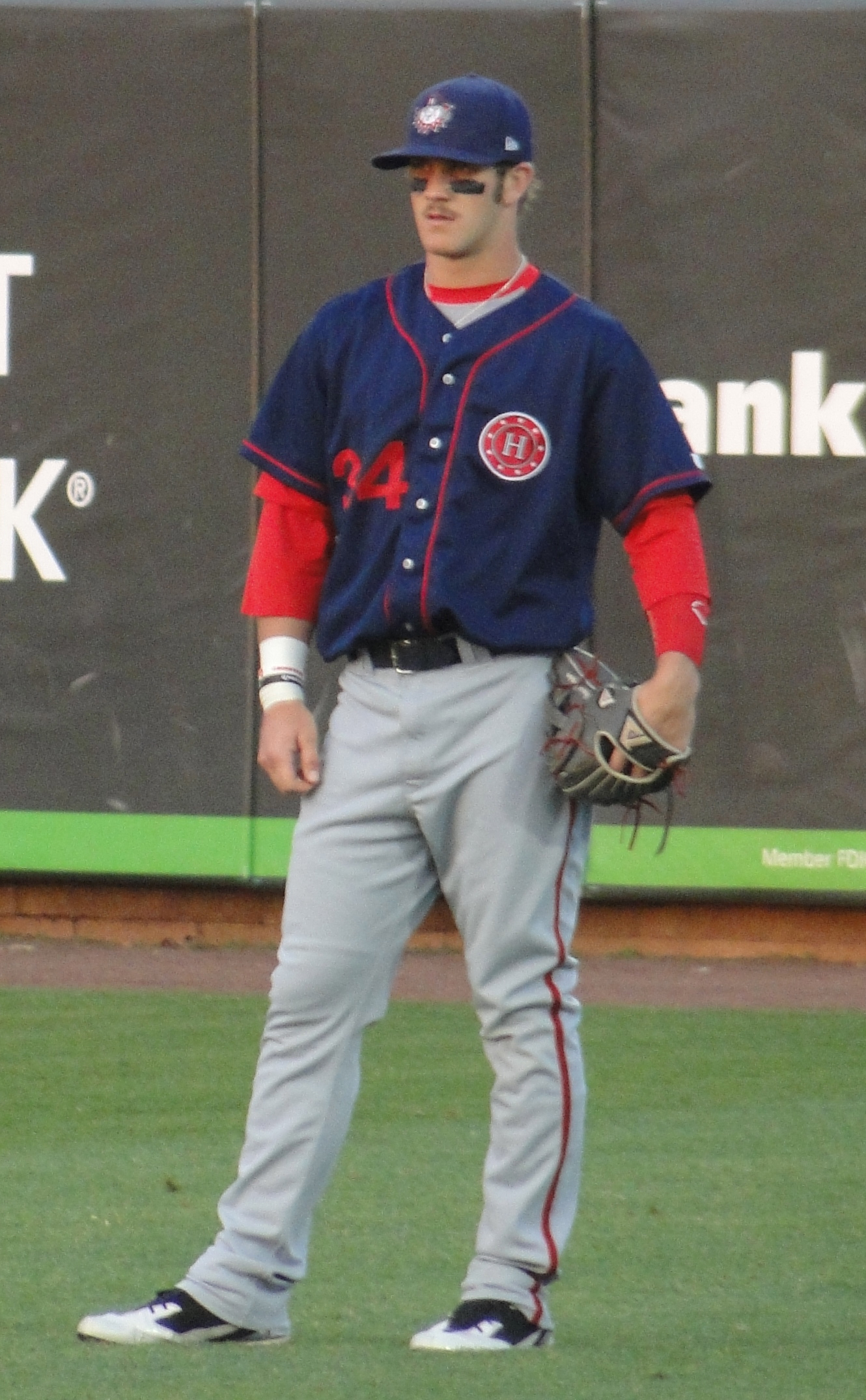
Harper playing the outfield for the Hagerstown Suns, May 2011

=== Draft and minor leagues ===
The Washington Nationals chose Harper with the first overall selection of the 2010 Major League Baseball draft. Although Harper had previously and predominantly played catcher, the Nationals drafted him as an outfielder to extend his career and to accelerate his player development so that he could debut in MLB earlier.

At the signing deadline, Harper and the Nationals agreed to a five-year contract worth $9.9 million, including a $6.25 million signing bonus and eight semesters of college tuition. When asked about the signing, Nationals President Stan Kasten said, "The truth is, with a full minute to go, Mike and I both thought we were not going to have a deal." Asked what changed in that final minute, Nationals General Manager Mike Rizzo replied, "It was both sides compromising and knowing that we were so close, it would be fruitless not to get a deal done." On August 26, 2010, Harper was introduced by the Nationals. He said he chose to wear No. 34 because "I always loved Mickey Mantle, three and four equals seven."

After batting .319 with a .407 OBP (and leading his team in hits, home runs, RBIs, and walks) in the Nationals' fall instructional league, Harper was selected to participate in the Arizona Fall League (AFL) as a member of the Scottsdale Scorpions taxi-squad, the second-youngest player in the history of the league (two days older than when Mets' prospect Fernando Martínez appeared in the league in 2006). He batted .343 and slugged .729. On November 20, Harper and the Scottsdale Scorpions won the 2010 AFL Championship.

After batting .399 in spring training, Harper began his minor league career when the Nationals optioned him to the Hagerstown Suns of the Class-A South Atlantic League. In April 2011, after a slow start in the minor leagues, Harper visited optometrist Dr. Keith Smithson, who reportedly told him, "I don't know how you ever hit before. You have some of the worst eyes I've ever seen." In his first 20 games after receiving contact lenses, Harper hit .480, collecting seven home runs, 10 doubles and 23 RBIs.

Harper was selected to represent the United States in the 2011 All-Star Futures Game during the 2011 All-Star Game weekend. He was promoted to the Harrisburg Senators of the Double-A Eastern League on July 4. Harper went 2-for-3 in his Double-A debut with two singles, a run, and a walk. On August 18, Harper injured his hamstring while running from second to third on an extra-base hit. The injury was severe enough for him to be carried off the field by his coaches. He was placed on the seven-day disabled list and the injury ended Harper's season.

Harper began the 2012 season with the Syracuse Chiefs of the Triple-A International League.

=== Washington Nationals (2012–2018) ===
==== 2012 season: NL Rookie of the Year ====
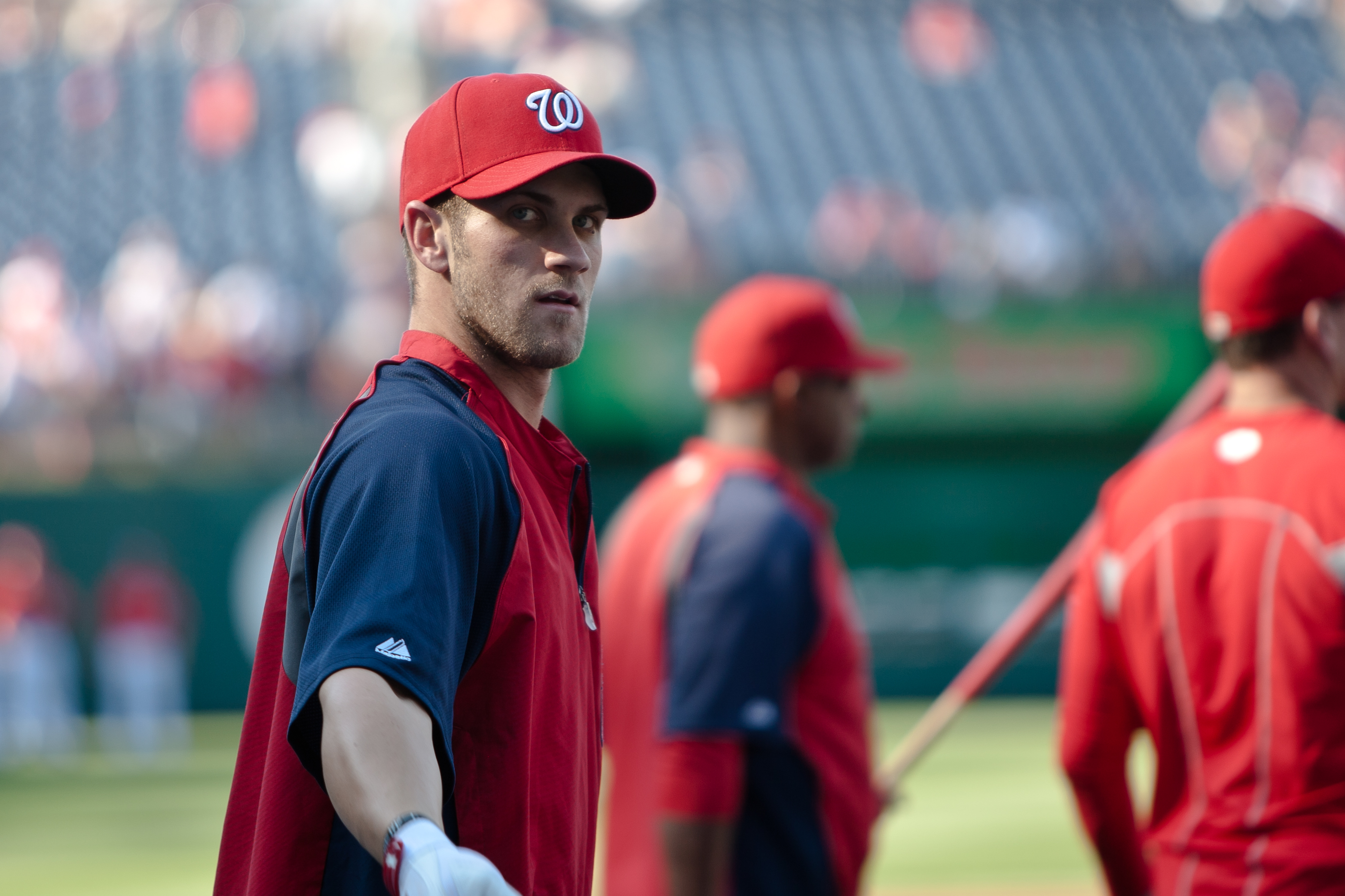
Harper at Nationals Park, May 2012

The Nationals promoted Harper to the major leagues on April 27, 2012, after Ryan Zimmerman was placed on the disabled list. Harper made his MLB debut with the Nationals the next day against the Los Angeles Dodgers. Harper grounded out to pitcher Chad Billingsley in his first major league at-bat. He recorded his first major league hit, a double, in his third at-bat against Billingsley and got his first RBI on a sacrifice fly in the top of the ninth against Javy Guerra.

After being hit by a pitch by Cole Hamels in the first inning of a game against the Phillies on May 6, Harper eventually advanced to third, then stole home plate, becoming the first teenager to steal home plate since 1964. Hamels later admitted that he intentionally hit Harper and was suspended for five games by MLB. On May 14, Harper was 19 when he hit his first career Major League home run, connecting off of San Diego Padres pitcher Tim Stauffer. He was the youngest player to homer in the major leagues since Adrián Beltré did in 1998. He was named National League Rookie of the Month for May.

Harper earned his first walk-off hit on June 5 with an RBI single in the bottom of the 12th inning against the New York Mets.

During a game against the Toronto Blue Jays on June 12, Harper hit a deep home run to center field that struck an advertising banner adjacent to the restaurant in the second tier of seats at the Rogers Centre, estimated to travel 438 feet. After the game, a reporter asked if Harper would take advantage of Ontario's lower drinking age (19, versus 21 in the U.S.) by drinking a celebratory beer with his teammates. Harper replied, "I'm not going to answer that. That's a clown question, bro." The comment quickly developed into an Internet meme, with the phrase itself repeated, in response to a question, by Senate Majority Leader Harry Reid. Harper filed an application to trademark the phrase.

Harper was named a candidate in the All-Star Final Vote, with the winner being added to the All-Star Game roster. Harper finished third behind David Freese and Michael Bourn. However, Bourn would make the roster after Ian Desmond sustained an injury and Harper would become the youngest position player (and third-youngest player, behind Dwight Gooden and Bob Feller) to ever make an All-Star roster when it was announced Giancarlo Stanton would undergo knee surgery. "I don't have words to explain it right now. It's exciting to go. I'm excited to get there and be around all the top guys in the country, of course, and the top guys in baseball. I'm going to take it all in and try to enjoy it with my family and just be as mellow and as calm as I can," Harper stated. He went 0-for-1 with a strikeout and a walk.

Harper struggled in the games following the All-Star break, hitting .176 with 26 strikeouts in his first 116 plate appearances in the second half of the season. Manager Davey Johnson began to give Harper days off due to his poor play and visible on-field frustration. Johnson said that Harper had become "overly aggressive" at the plate.

Harper's play began to improve in late August. He hit two home runs in a game against the Miami Marlins on August 29, his first career multi-homer game, and received his first major league ejection after throwing his helmet down in the ninth inning in response to hitting into a double play. He had a second multi-homer game on September 5, against the Chicago Cubs. Harper was named Rookie of the Month again in September after hitting .330 with seven home runs. Harper's 254 total bases and 57 extra base hits were the most ever for a player under age 20, while his 22 home runs, 98 runs scored, .340 on-base percentage, .477 slugging percentage, and .817 on base-plus-slugging were the best regular season totals for a teenager in the past 45 years.

In Game 5 of the 2012 NLDS against the St. Louis Cardinals, Harper hit his first postseason home run. The Nationals would eventually lose the game 9–7 despite leading by 6 runs. He finished his first postseason appearance with a .130 batting average.

Harper was named the National League Rookie of the Year. He received 112 votes, 16 of them first-place votes, beating Arizona's Wade Miley (105 votes, 12 first-place) and Cincinnati's Todd Frazier.

==== 2013 season ====
Harper hit two home runs against the Miami Marlins on Opening Day of the 2013 season. At age 20, he became the youngest major league player to hit two home runs in his team's first game of the season. He was voted a starter for the MLB All-Star Game, his second career All-Star selection.

After hitting 13 home runs in just 58 games, Harper was selected to participate in the 2013 Home Run Derby. Harper hit a total of 16 home runs in the first two rounds to advance to the final round, in which he faced Yoenis Céspedes, an outfielder for the Oakland Athletics. Although he lost 9–8 in the finals, Harper was the second-youngest player to participate in the Home Run Derby, and the youngest to ever make it to the final round. Harper hit his 17th homer of the season on August 6, the 39th of his career, passing Ken Griffey Jr. for most home runs by a player younger than 21. Only two other players hit more home runs than Harper before turning 21. In 118 games, he hit .274/.368/.486 with 20 home runs, 58 RBIs, and 47 extra base hits. During the 2013 off-season, Harper successfully underwent left knee surgery to remove a bursa sac.

==== 2014 season ====
During a game against the San Diego Padres on April 25, 2014, Harper suffered a left thumb injury when he slid into third base on a 3-run triple. He was placed on the 15-day disabled list the next day. An MRI revealed that the thumb had a torn ulnar collateral ligament. On April 28, it was announced that Harper would require surgery to repair the ligament tear in the thumb. During a rehab game with Double-A Harrisburg on June 28, Harper hit three home runs in one game. Harper returned to the Majors on June 30. In 100 games during the season, Harper batted .273 with 13 home runs and 32 RBI.

After the 2014 season, Harper planned to travel to Japan to participate in the 2014 Major League Baseball Japan All-Star Series, but later withdrew.

==== 2015 season: First NL MVP ====
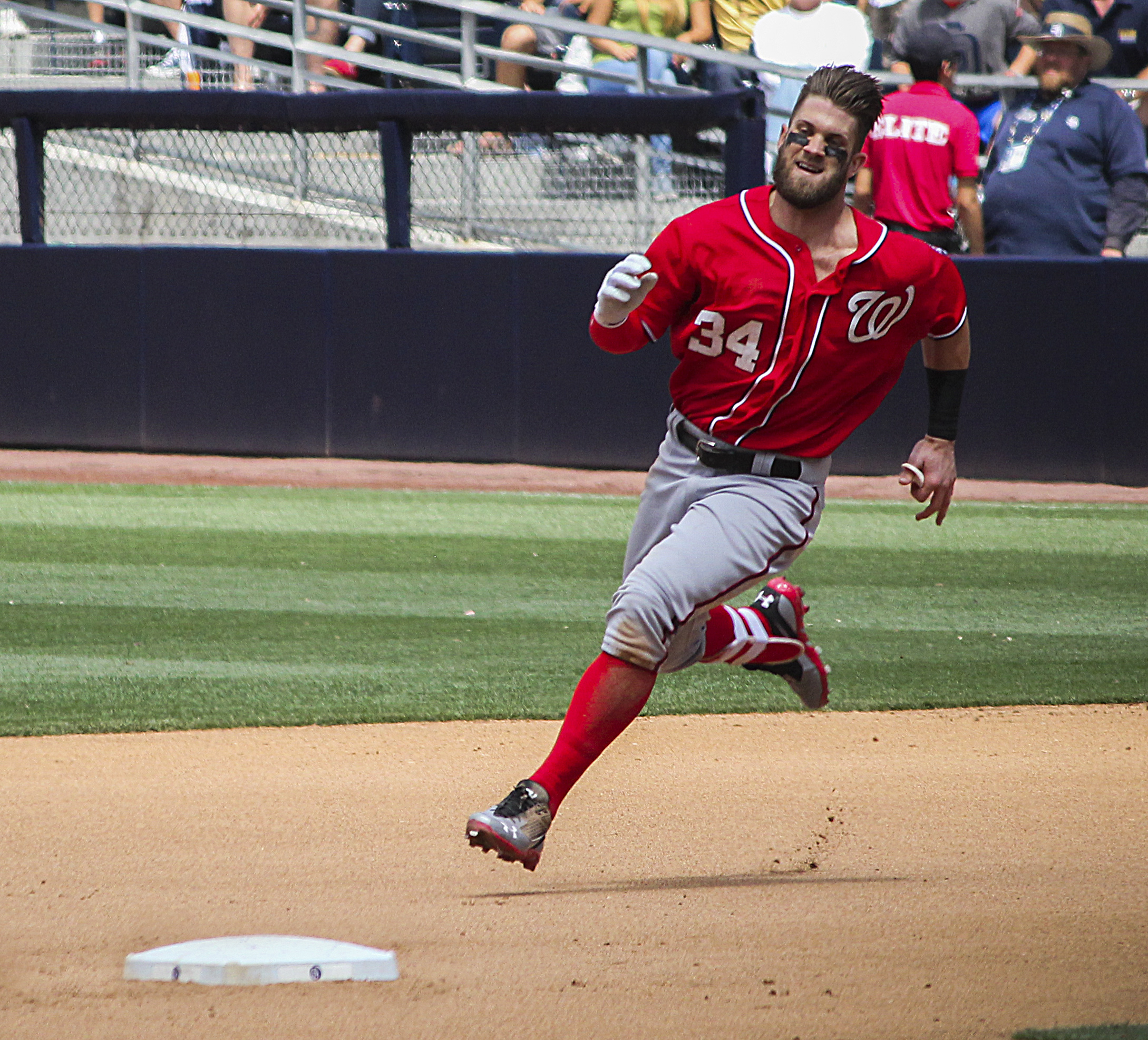
Harper approaching second base, May 2015

On April 18, 2015, Harper hit the longest home run of his MLB career with a 461-foot drive over the center field wall against the Philadelphia Phillies. On May 6, Harper hit three home runs in a single game for the first time in his career. He did it against Tom Koehler, with one of the shots going 442 feet to the second deck in a 7–5 victory over the Miami Marlins. He became the youngest player to accomplish this feat since Joe Lahoud in 1969. Harper was later awarded the Player of the Month Award for May for the first time in his career.

Measured by OPS+, which adjusts on-base plus slugging for park factors and normalizes it against league averages, Harper's 2015 was a top-5 hitting season (since 1900) for all players under the age of 23, and the best season of any hitter since Barry Bonds a decade earlier. Harper led the majors in WAR and tied for the NL home run title with 42. Harper also became the youngest player ever with at least 40 home runs and 120 walks in one season, a distinction previously held by Babe Ruth.

Harper's historic season earned him many awards. He received all 30 first place votes for the 2015 National League Most Valuable Player. At age 23, Harper became the youngest player to unanimously win an MVP award. He also became the first player in Nationals/Expos history to win an MVP award and the first player that played for a Washington team to win the honor. He also won the Hank Aaron Award as the NL's top hitter, and Baseball America named him the player of the year. ESPN chose him as its 2015 MLB Person of the Year.

Despite Harper's strong season, the Nationals finished in second in the NL East at 83–79, 7 games behind the Mets.

==== 2016 season ====
On April 14, 2016, Harper hit his first career grand slam for his 100th career home run in a game against the Atlanta Braves. Three days later, he hit a home run for a fourth straight game, setting a new career streak for most consecutive games with a home run. He was named National League Player of the Week on April 18, after driving in 12 runs, tying a club record for home runs in consecutive games and becoming the eighth-youngest player in major league history to reach 100 home runs.

On Mother's Day, May 8, Harper was walked six times in a game against the Chicago Cubs, tying the MLB record for most walks in a game. Harper reached base seven times that day (he was also hit by a pitch), becoming the first player in over 100 years to reach base seven times without recording an at-bat. He saw 27 pitches in total, and swung his pink Mother's Day bat at none of them, as the Cubs defeated the Nats 4–3 in 13 innings. Over the weekend four game series, Harper was walked 13 times, setting a new MLB record for most walks in a series. The following day, Harper was ejected from the dugout for yelling at home plate umpire Brian Knight when teammate Danny Espinosa was called out on strikes. Harper returned to the field to celebrate the 5–4 walk-off win over the Detroit Tigers with his teammates and was caught shouting profanity towards Knight. Two days later, Harper was given a one-game suspension and an undisclosed fine, but Harper appealed the same day. On May 14, Harper dropped his appeal and began serving the one-game suspension. In 147 games of 2016, Harper finished with a .243 batting average, 24 home runs, and 86 RBI. He also walked 108 times, and 20 of them were intentional that led MLB.

The Nationals finished the season with a 95–67 record, clinching the NL East division, but lost to the Dodgers in the 2016 NLDS.

==== 2017 season ====
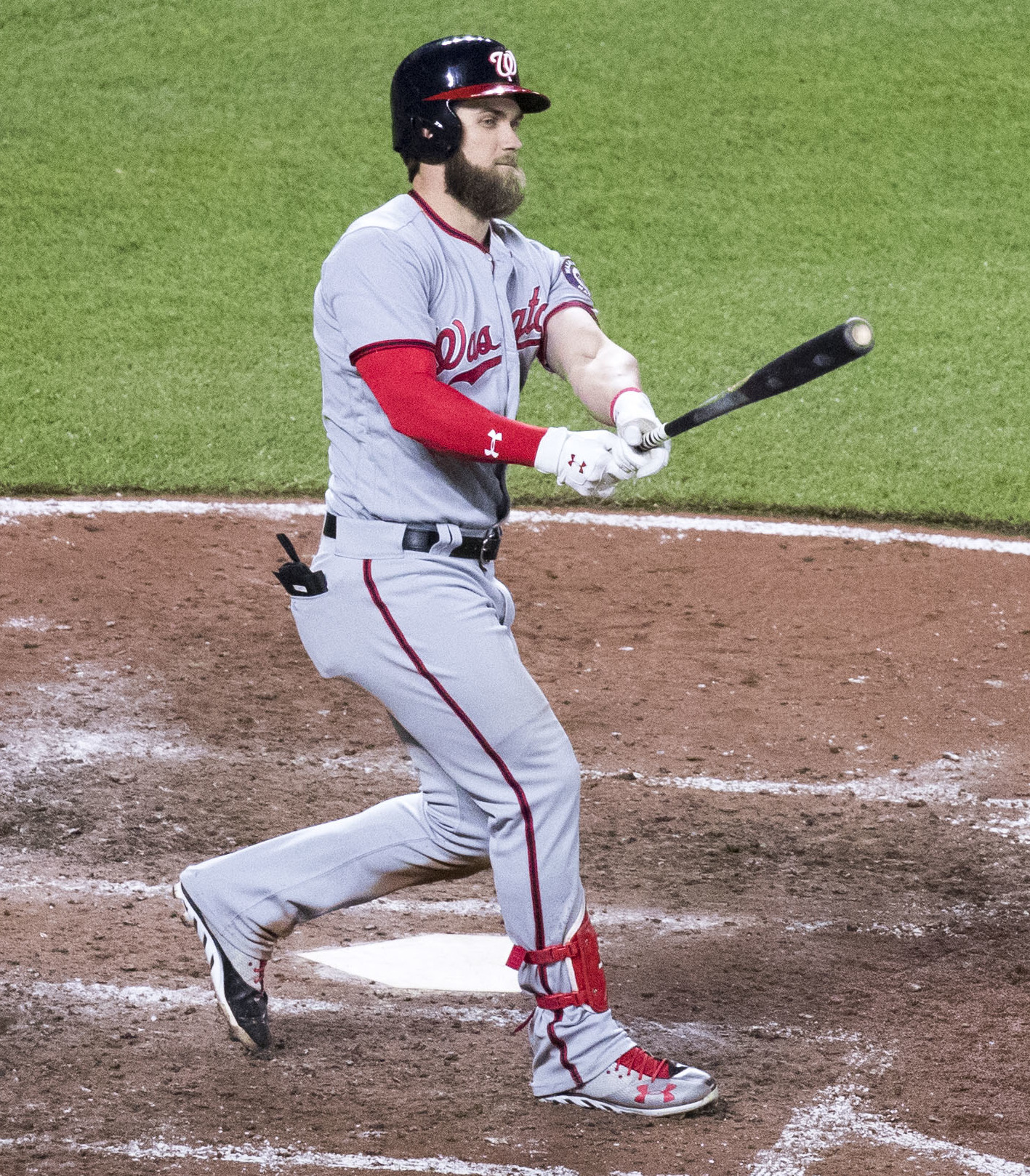
Harper in 2017

On Opening Day, April 3, 2017, Harper hit a solo home run, struck out, and walked against the Miami Marlins. His home run was the fifth of his career in a season opener, the most by a player younger than 25. He set the MLB record for runs scored in the month of April with 32, surpassing Larry Walker's 29 in 1997.

On May 13, Harper and the Nationals avoided arbitration in 2018 by agreeing to a one-year, $21.625-million contract. That night, he hit a walk-off home run versus the Philadelphia Phillies for the second time in the 2017 season, after doing it on April 16 as well.

On May 16, Harper hit a home run at PNC Park, which meant in his career he had hit a home run in all 15 National League ballparks.

On May 29, in a game against the San Francisco Giants, Harper was hit by a pitch from Hunter Strickland. Harper had hit two home runs off of Strickland in the 2014 National League Division Series (a series the Giants won), leading Harper to believe Strickland was seeking revenge. Harper slammed down his bat and charged the mound, throwing his helmet wide of Strickland before the two players exchanged punches, starting a bench-clearing brawl in which Giants first baseman Michael Morse, one of several former Nationals teammates of Harper on the Giants team, suffered a serious concussion in a collision with Giants pitcher Jeff Samardzija, which would go on to end his career. Both Harper and Strickland were ejected for their roles in the brawl. The next day, on May 30, Harper was suspended four games. Harper appealed, and his suspension was reduced to three games. Harper credited Morse with preventing him from injury during the scrum, as Morse had absorbed a body blow from Samardzija that appeared to be aimed at Harper, telling a MASN reporter, "I'm very thankful for Mikey Mo."

Harper was the top overall vote-getter for the National League to start in the 2017 Major League Baseball All-Star Game and received the most votes of any one player overall. As the starting right fielder for the National League All-Stars, he went 1-for-1 with a walk and made a diving catch to rob American League catcher Salvador Pérez of a base hit. He wore cleats for the All-Star Game in honor of the late Miami Marlins ace José Fernández, a division rival pitcher who had held Harper to a career .211 batting average against him; Fernández had been killed in a September 2016 boat crash.

On July 27, Harper hit one of four consecutive home runs by Nationals hitters off Milwaukee Brewers starter Michael Blazek; this was the first time that the feat had been accomplished in Major League Baseball since the 2011 season. On August 7, he hit his 150th home run. He was 24 years and 295 days old when he accomplished this feat, exactly the same age as Los Angeles Angels superstar Mike Trout when he hit his 150th home run. On August 12, Harper suffered a hyperextended left knee after reaching first base; the injury forced him to leave the game. It was later revealed that his left knee had a significant bone bruise, but no ligament damage, sending him to the disabled list but prompting team officials to say they were confident he could return before the end of the season. On September 27, Bryce was reactivated off of the DL against the Philadelphia Phillies. On October 13, Harper went 2–4 with an RBI in Game 5 of the NLDS, and made the last out of the game by striking out against Chicago Cubs' closer, Wade Davis, ending the Nationals' NLCS bid.

==== 2018 season ====
Harper began the 2018 season by drawing more walks than in previous years. He was batting .219 with 21 home runs and 50 RBIs when he was named a starting outfielder for the 2018 MLB All-Star Game, where he also won the homerun derby. He finished the season with a career-high 130 walks, 34 home runs, a .249 batting average, and 100 RBIs, marking his first season reaching triple-digit RBIs. He became a free agent after the 2018 season.

=== Philadelphia Phillies (2019–present) ===
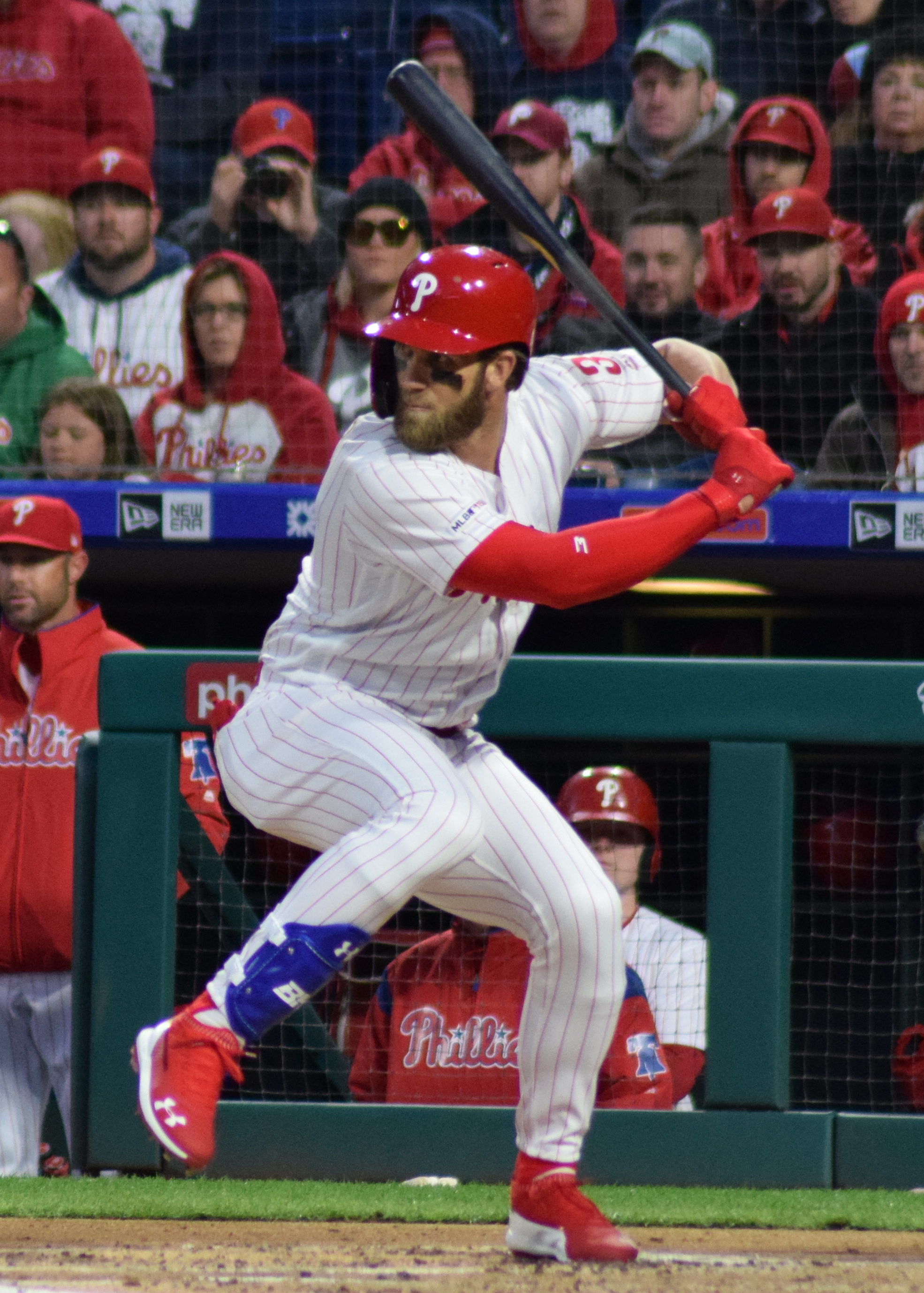
Harper with the Philadelphia Phillies at Citizens Bank Park, March 2019

Initially the Nationals sought to offer Harper a new contract with the team; however he later rejected two offers, describing them as disappointing. Numerous reports had also linked Harper to possibly sign a $45 million annual contract with the Los Angeles Dodgers, Despite the offer from the Dodgers, Harper signed a 13-year, $330 million contract with the Philadelphia Phillies on March 2, 2019. This deal set the record for the largest MLB contract until Mike Trout signed a 12-year, $430 million contract extension with the Los Angeles Angels. Harper chose to wear No. 3 with the club, as the number he wore with the Nationals (34) was being considered for retirement by the Phillies in honor of the late Roy Halladay. At his first press conference, Harper misspoke, saying, "We want to bring a title back to D.C." The Nationals went on to win the 2019 World Series in Harper's absence.

==== 2019 season ====
Harper speaking with Ken Rosenthal in 2019

Harper's first hit as a member of the Phillies was a 465-foot home run to the second deck of the right field bleachers at Citizens Bank Park on March 30, 2019, off Jesse Biddle of the Atlanta Braves. On August 15, 2019, Harper hit a walk-off grand slam against the Chicago Cubs. On September 3, 2019, Harper would bat his 100th RBI of the season for the second consecutive year and was the first Philadelphia Phillies player since Ryan Howard in 2011 to hit for 100 RBIs or more in a season. However, the Phillies missed the playoffs, being eliminated officially on September 24 by losing to the eventual World Series champions and Harper's former team, the Washington Nationals.

==== 2020 season ====
In March 2020, the MLB season was suspended indefinitely due to the COVID-19 pandemic. On May 15, Harper took to Instagram and suggested a potential 135-game season that would last from July through November. MLB eventually settled on a 60-game season that began on July 24. Harper hit .268/.420/.542 with 13 home runs and 33 RBIs and led the majors with 49 walks during the season.

==== 2021 season: Second NL MVP ====
In 2021, Harper batted .309/.429/.615 with 35 home runs and 84 RBIs in 141 games. His slugging percentage led the major leagues. He also led the National League with 78 extra-base hits and tied for the major league lead with 42 doubles. He won his second career National League MVP award. He is the second player in MLB history to win a league MVP with two different teams before the age of 30, joining Barry Bonds.

==== 2022 season: NLCS MVP and first World Series appearance ====
On May 12, Harper was diagnosed with a small tear in the ulnar collateral ligament of his right elbow. He received a platelet-rich plasma injection to alleviate the pain on May 15, but was not allowed to throw in the outfield for at least six weeks. He was used exclusively as a designated hitter to avoid further damage. While playing against the San Diego Padres on June 25, Harper was hit by a pitch from Blake Snell. In the aftermath, Harper suffered a fractured left thumb and ruled out indefinitely. He underwent surgery on his thumb on July 6 with three pins being inserted to stabilize the area. Harper was voted as an All-Star, but was replaced by Marlins first baseman Garrett Cooper due to his injury.

In August, Harper was designated to the Lehigh Valley IronPigs in Allentown, the Phillies' Triple-A affiliate, as a final step in his rehabilitation stint from his thumb fracture in June. IronPigs' fans in Allentown greeted Harper's appearance enthusiastically, and Coca-Cola Park quickly sold out to its 10,100 capacity for Harper's appearance against the Gwinnett Stripers. In his August 23 appearance with the IronPigs, Harper homered twice. The Phillies surged in the second half to reach the playoffs, their first appearance since 2011.

In the 2022 regular season, Harper batted .286/.364/.514 in 370 at bats, with 63 runs, 18 home runs, 65 RBIs, 7 sacrifice flies (6th in the NL), and 9 intentional walks (9th), as he had the ninth-highest salary in baseball ($27.5 million). He played 90 games at DH, and eight games in right field.

In Harper's first postseason series since 2017, he hit a home run in Game 2 of the NL Wild Card Series vs St. Louis in an eventual 2–0 victory. With their advancement to the NLDS, Harper finally won a postseason series. He batted 8 for 16 in the NLDS against the defending champion Atlanta Braves, helping the Phillies win the series 3–1 and advance to the NLCS for the first time since 2010.

On October 23, 2022, during Game 5 of the National League Championship Series, Harper hit a go-ahead two-run home run in the bottom of the eighth inning off of Padres right-handed reliever Robert Suárez. It would prove to be the game-winning hit, sending the Phillies to the 2022 World Series against the Houston Astros. At the end of the game, Harper was voted 2022 NLCS MVP.

During his first World Series, Harper went 4-for-20 (.200) in at bats, scoring a run each in Games 1 and 3. Most notably, in Game 3, Harper hit the first of five homers from the Phillies against Lance McCullers, Jr., with the game tying the record for most home runs from a single team in one World Series game. The Phillies lost against the Astros four games to two.

==== 2023 season ====
On November 23, 2022, Harper underwent Tommy John surgery for his ligament tear and was expected to be able to return as the Phillies' everyday designated hitter at around the All-Star break. Harper rejoined the team earlier than expected, in early May, brandishing a large arm brace. In July, Harper made his first career start as a first baseman.

==== 2024 season ====
In the first half of the 2024 season, Harper put up a hard work notice, hitting 21 home runs and even hitting three home runs in a game against the Cincinnati Reds on April 2nd in the 9–4 win. On July 13, 2024, Harper reached the milestone of homering against every team in Major League Baseball, hitting a solo home run on a pitch by Austin Adams of the Oakland Athletics.

By the end of the 2024 season, he batted .285/.373/.525 in 550 at bats, with 85 runs, 30 home runs, 87 RBIs, and walked intentionally 11 times, which was the National League lead. His performance helped the Phillies win their first NL East division title in thirteen years. The Phillies’ season came to an end as they lost to the New York Mets in the NLDS.

==== 2025 season ====
On May 16, 2025, Harper recorded his 1,000th RBI against the Pittsburgh Pirates in an 8–4 Phillies comeback victory. He also became the fourteenth player in MLB history to reach 1,000 RBIs, 1,000 runs, and 1,000 walks before turning 33. On July 23, Harper hit his 350th career home run when he hit it in the first inning against the Boston Red Sox. He became the eighth active player to reach that milestone, joining Giancarlo Stanton (434), Mike Trout (396), Paul Goldschmidt (370), Manny Machado (360), Freddie Freeman (353), Aaron Judge (352), and Nolan Arenado (351). He is also the youngest active player to have reached that milestone at age 32.

In the 2025 season, he batted .261/.357/.487 in 501 at bats, with 72 runs, 27 home runs, and 75 RBIs as the Phillies won back-to-back NL East division titles, before losing to the then two-time defending World Series champions Los Angeles Dodgers in the NLDS.

==== 2026 season ====
Harper hit for the cycle against the New York Mets on June 20, 2026 and became the 11th player in Phillies franchise history to do so. On July 8, Harper was named by Rob Manfred as a "legend pick" to the All-Star Game. At the time of the announcement, he was hitting .274 with 20 home runs and 57 runs batted in.

After the acquisition of Luis Arráez, and knowing if the Phillies make a trade in the infield, Harper made his first outfield start at right field since 2022, on August 3 against the Washington Nationals. On the very first pitch of the game, Harper caught a fly out off Dylan Crews in right field.

Overall in 2026, Harper played a complete season of 162 games, which was a first for his career. His final statistics for that season featured a .269 batting average, 29 home runs, 87 RBI, an NL-leading 107 walks, and a career-high in at-bats with 577.

In Game 2 of the 2026 National League Wild Card Series against the Atlanta Braves, during the bottom of the seventh inning, Harper misplayed a flyball hit by Drake Baldwin, resulting in him dropping the ball and letting two runs score. The play was ruled a double and not an error. Then, in the top of the eighth, Harper redeemed himself, hitting a game-tying home run to right field after Kyle Schwarber hit a homer earlier before he came up to bat. The Phillies would wound up winning that game in 10 innings, 4–3, although they would be eliminated after losing in game three.

== International career ==
Harper played for the United States U-18 baseball team in 2008, before he was drafted by the Nationals. In 2009, he represented the United States at the Pan American U-18 Baseball Championship, in Barquisimeto, Venezuela, where the team won gold.

On August 12, 2022, Harper announced that he would join the United States national baseball team in the 2023 World Baseball Classic, joining fellow Phillies J. T. Realmuto and Trea Turner. However, Harper was unable to play due to rehabbing from Tommy John surgery in the offseason. Team USA would go on to finish as runners-up, losing to Japan in the championship game.

Harper later expressed his hope that MLB players would be allowed to participate in the 2028 Summer Olympics in Los Angeles after it was announced in 2023 that baseball would return as a competition sport. "I'm going to be old at that point, so I don't know if they're going to want me on the team, but it's always a dream... I would love to put 'USA' on my chest and represent it at the highest level. I know the WBC, and everyone loves that and it's great for the game, but it's not the Olympics."

Harper represented the United States during the 2026 World Baseball Classic. In the championship game against Venezuela, Harper hit a game-tying two-run home run in the bottom of the 8th inning. However, Team USA would go on to lose the game 3–2, finishing as runners-up in the World Baseball Classic for the second time in a row. In the tournament, Harper had a .214 average, going 6–28 with 1 home run and 3 RBI.

== Career accomplishments ==
- 2× NL Most Valuable Player (2015, 2021)
- 8× MLB All-Star selection (2012, 2013, 2015, 2016, 2017, 2018, 2022, 2024)
- National League Rookie of the Year (2012)
- 2× NL Hank Aaron Award (2015, 2021)
- 4× Silver Slugger Award (2015, 2021, 2023, 2024)
- NLCS MVP (2022)
- ESPN MLB Person of the Year (2015)
- All-Star Futures Game selection (2011)
- Golden Spikes Award (2010)
- SWAC Player of the Year (2010)
- Baseball America High School Player of the Year (2009)

== Personal life ==
Harper resides in Knoxville, Tennessee, relocating there during the 2023/2024 offseason. His father, Ron, is an ironworker in Las Vegas and his mother is Sherilyn Harper. Harper attributes his work ethic to the lessons he learned from watching his father: "I wanted to come out and I wanted to work hard because he worked hard. He did it for over 25 years." Harper's older brother, Bryan, also played in the Washington Nationals organization. While playing on different teams within the Nationals organization, the Harper brothers spoke by phone "almost every day" during the baseball season, according to Bryce. When he was a youth in Las Vegas, he also played alongside Joey Gallo and Kris Bryant. He has said in interviews that Joe Mauer was his favorite player growing up.

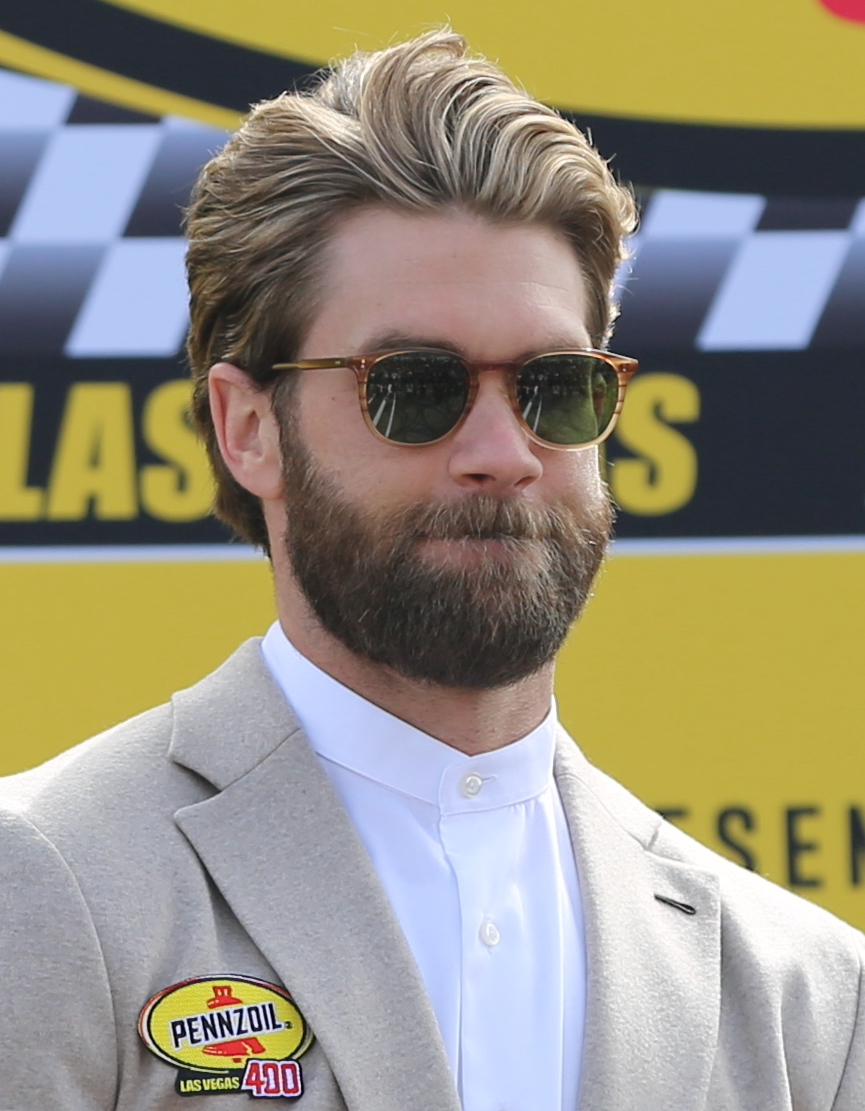
Harper at the 2023 Pennzoil 400

Harper is a member of the Church of Jesus Christ of Latter-day Saints. Though serving a mission is strongly encouraged for male members of The Church of Jesus Christ of Latter-day Saints who are between the ages of 18 and 26, it is not required. In a 2016 interview, he said, "Coming up to the draft and trying to make that decision, I always thought that my Heavenly Father upstairs always just wanted me to be a walking Book of Mormon, you could say... I knew that I could touch a lot of people's lives playing and trying to be the best Mormon that I can be on and off the field."

Harper and his girlfriend Kayla Varner were engaged in 2014, but their wedding that was set for January 2015 did not take place. In July 2016, Kayla announced the couple's reconciliation and re-engagement. They were married at the San Diego California Temple in December 2016. Their first child, a son, was born in Las Vegas on August 22, 2019, while Harper was with his wife on paternity leave. Their second child, a daughter, was born in November 2020. The Harpers' third child, a daughter was born in April 2024. In April 2025, Harper announced their fourth pregnancy by debuting a blue colored bat, handed to him by Trea Turner, revealing that baby is a boy. Harper’s fourth child was born on October 2, 2025.

In 2018, the Washington Nationals Dream Foundation and the District of Columbia Department of Parks and Recreation renovated a baseball field in the Takoma neighborhood of Washington, D.C., and named it Bryce Harper Field. Harper is a fan of the Vegas Golden Knights of the NHL. He dropped the puck before a game in their inaugural season and put the Golden Knights' logo on his bat during their run to the Stanley Cup Final in 2018. After his first son's birth, the Vegas Golden Knights gifted him a personalized jersey. Harper also grew up a fan of the Dallas Cowboys of the NFL but was converted into a Philadelphia Eagles fan after moving to Philadelphia.

=== Endorsements and other media appearances ===
Harper was featured in an episode of ESPN E:60. He was featured in a nonrevealing naked format in ESPN's The Magazine 2015 Body Issue. Harper has appeared on The Tonight Show Starring Jimmy Fallon on two occasions, the first in 2016 to play Catch Phrase with Fallon, Andy Samberg and Gigi Hadid, and the second in 2019 to play the video game MLB The Show 19, which featured him as the cover athlete. In 2016, Harper signed a 10-year extension with apparel company Under Armour, at the time the largest endorsement deal in history for a baseball player.

On July 9, 2026, The Philadelphia Inquirer reported that in November 2024 a customer manager of FanDuel, Bryttanni Morgan, sent Terry Thompson, a Philadelphia sports fan who gambled on the platform at the time, a personal video message from Cameo recorded by Harper. In the video, Harper said he was reaching out at the request of "your host Bryttanni at FanDuel", addressed Thompson and his son by name, and thanked him for his support. The video bore a FanDuel watermark, although Harper is not wearing any FanDuel merchandise in it. Thompson at the time was a high-volume, addicted sports gambler who lost $1.5 million gambling with FanDuel, and the video was released as part of his lawsuit against FanDuel. The lawsuit does not name Harper. That same day, during media availability before the Phillies game against the Reds, Harper declined to comment on the FanDuel video. On July 13, Harper said he did not know the video message would be used by FanDuel; the request for the message was made on Cameo and he was instructed to read a provided script.

== See also ==
- List of largest sports contracts
- List of Major League Baseball annual doubles leaders
- List of Major League Baseball annual runs scored leaders
- List of Major League Baseball career bases on balls leaders
- List of Major League Baseball career games played as a right fielder leaders
- List of Major League Baseball career home run leaders
- List of Major League Baseball career intentional bases on balls leaders
- List of Major League Baseball career OPS leaders
- List of Major League Baseball career extra base hits leaders
- List of Major League Baseball career runs batted in leaders
- List of Major League Baseball career runs scored leaders
- List of Major League Baseball career slugging percentage leaders
- List of Major League Baseball career strikeouts by batters leaders
- List of National League annual slugging percentage leaders
- List of people from Las Vegas
- List of Philadelphia Phillies award winners and league leaders
- List of Washington Nationals team records

== Notes ==
Achievements
| Preceded by Pete Crow-Armstrong | Hitting for the cycle June 20, 2026 | Succeeded by Tristan Peters |
