= Street Beat (song) =

Single by Toni Basil

from the album Toni Basil
- Released: 1983
- Genre: Power pop; new wave
- Length: 3:37
- Label: A&M
- Songwriter(s): Allee Willis, Bruce Roberts, Toni Basil
- Producer(s): Greg Mathieson, Trevor Veitch

Toni Basil singles chronology
"Over My Head" (1983)	"Street Beat" (1983)	"Suspense" (1984)

"Street Beat" is a song by Toni Basil, released in 1983 as the first single from her self-titled second album Toni Basil. Without a music video, the single failed to chart on the Billboard Hot 100, but it did peak at No. 63 on the Hot Dance Club Play chart.
