= Mickey (Toni Basil song) =

1981 single by Toni Basil

- Artwork for US vinyl release

Single by Toni Basil

from the album Word of Mouth
- B-side: "Hanging Around"; "Thief on the Loose"
- Released: March 1981
- Genre: New wave; bubblegum pop; glam rock
- Length: 4:12 (album version); 3:36 (single version)
- Label: Chrysalis (US); Radialchoice, Virgin (international)
- Songwriters: Mike Chapman; Nicky Chinn
- Producers: Greg Mathieson; Trevor Veitch

Toni Basil singles chronology
"Breakaway" (1966)	"Mickey" (1981)	"Nobody" (1982)

Music Video
- "Mickey" on YouTube

"Mickey" (also titled "Hey Mickey") is a song originally recorded by English rock band Racey under the title "Kitty" for their debut studio album Smash and Grab (1979). American singer Toni Basil covered it for her debut studio album Word of Mouth (1981). Nicky Chinn and Mike Chapman co-wrote the song while production was helmed by Greg Mathieson and Trevor Veitch. It is a new wave song, featuring guitar, synthesizers, and cheerleading chants. The song was released as Word of Mouth's lead single on January 3, 1982, by Chrysalis Records.

== Background ==
The song was originally performed by British pop group Racey, with the title "Kitty", and was included on their debut studio album Smash and Grab in 1979. The original Racey song did not include the "Oh Mickey, you're so fine" chant, which Basil added.

For many years it was rumored that the name was changed to Mickey on speculations that Basil had developed a crush on The Monkees' drummer and lead vocalist Micky Dolenz after meeting him on the set of their film Head, for which she was the choreographer. However, that claim has been denied by Basil, who said that she "didn't really know Micky at all".

In January 2020, Basil released a re-recording of the song as "Hey Mickey" to digital and streaming platforms.

== Legal claims ==
On August 31, 2017, Basil filed a multi-claim lawsuit against Razor & Tie Direct, Forever 21, Disney, Viacom, VH1, and South Park. Basil alleged that the defendants had commercially used the song "Mickey" without a license and damaged her right of publicity, claiming excess of $25,000 in damages. Basil also filed a lawsuit against AMC on May 12, 2020, for the unauthorized use of "Mickey" in a trailer for Preacher. On August 27, 2020, a California state of appeals court affirmed dismissal of Basil's case.

In 2013, a separate legal filing for the song was made by Basil. After almost a decade later in 2022, the courts ruled Basil was the sole copyright owner of her album Word Of Mouth, which included the song "Mickey".

== Composition ==
According to the sheet music published at Musicnotes.com by Alfred Music, the song is written in the key of E major and is set in time signature of common time with a tempo of 145 beats per minute. Basil's vocal range spans from B_{3} to C♯_{5}.

The chant incorporates the clap pattern (1, 1-2, 1-2-3) from the 1962 song "Let's Go (Pony)".

== Critical reception ==
Rock critic Robert Christgau commented on the perceived 'obscene' content of the lyric "So come on and give it to me / Any way you can / Any way you want to do it / I'll take it like a man". Christgau wrote in a review at the time that Basil "was the only woman ever to offer to take it up the ass on Top 40 radio." However, Basil has adamantly denied that the song is about anal sex, stating: "NO! That's ridiculous."

The single reached number one on the US Billboard Hot 100 for one week and number two on the UK Singles Chart. It is Basil's only top 40 success. The song was ranked at number 6 on VH1's "100 Greatest One Hit Wonders of the 80s".

== Music video ==
The music video was directed, produced and choreographed by Basil. The cheerleaders featured in the video were members of a championship squad from Carson High School in Carson, California. The cheerleading uniform Basil wore in the music video was the one she actually wore in high school. According to Basil, "They didn't put anything in the budget, I did everything myself. And this is the actual cheer sweater from Las Vegas High."

== Track listings and formats ==
US 7-inch single

1. "Mickey" – 3:36
2. "Thief on the Loose" – 3:50

International 7-inch single

1. "Mickey" – 3:36
2. "Hanging Around" – 4:06

US 12-inch single

1. "Mickey" (Special Club mix) (Short) – 4:32
2. "Mickey" (Special Club mix) (Long) – 5:58

Alternate US 12-inch single

1. "Mickey" (Special Club mix) – 5:58
2. "Mickey" (Spanish version) – 5:12
- 7-inch single
1. "Mickey" – 3:30
2. "Hanging Around" – 3:59
- SG CD single (1994)
1. "Mickey" (Original Version) – 3:29
2. "Mickey" (7-inch New Mix) – 6:03
3. "Mickey" (12-inch New Mix) – 4:13
4. "Mickey" (12-inch Alternative Version) – 3:57
5. "Mickey" (7-inch Instrumental) – 6:16
6. "Mickey" (7-inch Smart E's Version) – 6:04
7. "Mickey" (12-inch Smart E's Version – 6:16
8. "Mickey" (Smart E's Dub) – 6:16
- US CD single (1999)
1. "Mickey" (Radio Remix) – 3:29
2. "Mickey" ("Back to the Future" Club Mix) – 6:03
3. "Mickey" ("Killa Klub" Edit) – 3:57
4. "Mickey" ("Killa Klub" Mix) – 6:16
5. "Mickey" ("Killa Klub" Dub) – 6:04
- HK CD single (1999)
1. "Mickey" (Radio Remix) – 3:29
2. "Mickey" ("Back to the Future" Club Mix) – 6:03
3. "Mickey" (Jason Nevins Radio Remix) – 4:13
4. "Mickey" ("Killa Klub" Edit) – 3:57
5. "Mickey" ("Killa Klub" Mix) – 6:16
6. "Mickey" ("Killa Klub" Dub) – 6:04
- Digital rerecording (2020)
1. "Hey Mickey" – 4:12

Credits and personnel adapted from Word of Mouth album liner notes.

== Charts ==
=== Weekly charts ===
Chart (1982–1983)	Peak position
Australia (Kent Music Report)	1
Belgium (Ultratop 50 Flanders)	39
Canada (The Record)	1
Canada Top Singles (RPM)	1
Ireland (IRMA)	3
Netherlands (Single Top 100)	39
New Zealand (Recorded Music NZ)	2
South Africa (Springbok Radio)	3
UK Singles (Official Charts)	2
US Billboard Hot 100	1
US Dance Club Songs (Billboard)	3
US Cash Box	2
West Germany (GfK)	69

=== Year-end charts ===
Chart (1982)	Position
Australia (Kent Music Report)	6
Canada Top Singles (RPM)	63
New Zealand (RIANZ)	15
US Cash Box	36

Chart (1983)	Position
Canada Top Singles (RPM)	35
US Billboard Hot 100	36

== Certifications and sales ==
Region	Certification	Certified units/sales
Australia (ARIA)	Gold	50,000^{^}
Canada (Music Canada)	2× Platinum	200,000^{^}
United Kingdom (BPI)	Gold	500,000^{^}
United States (RIAA)	Platinum	2,000,000^{^}
^{^} Shipments figures based on certification alone.

== Other versions ==
=== Lolly version ===
"Mickey"

Single by Lolly

from the album My First Album
- Released: September 6, 1999
- Length: 3:35
- Label: Polydor
- Songwriters: Mike Chapman; Nicky Chinn
- Producer: Dufflebag Boys

Lolly singles chronology
"Viva La Radio" (1999)	"Mickey" (1999)	"Big Boys Don't Cry" (1999)

English singer Lolly covered "Mickey" which was released in September 1999 as the second single from her debut album My First Album. Her version reached number four on the UK Singles Chart the same month. A karaoke version appears on both the single and album.

=== Track listings ===
UK CD1 and Australian CD single

1. "Mickey" – 3:35
2. "Sweetheart" – 2:52
3. "Mickey" (karaoke version) – 3:35
4. "Mickey" (CD ROM video)

UK CD2

1. "Mickey" – 3:35
2. "Mickey" (Creator remix) – 5:58
3. "Mickey" (D-Bop remix edit) – 4:22
4. "Mickey" (The Bold & the Beautiful remix) – 5:50

UK cassette single

1. "Mickey" – 3:35
2. "Mickey" (karaoke version) – 3:35

=== Charts ===
==== Weekly charts ====
Chart (1999–2000)	Peak position
Australia (ARIA)	66
Europe (Eurochart Hot 100)	17
Ireland (IRMA)	14
Scottish Singles Sales (Official Charts)	4
UK Singles (Official Charts)	4

==== Year-end charts ====
Chart (1999)	Position
UK Singles (OCC)	87

=== Other artists ===
In addition to Lolly's version, several other artists covered or adapted Toni Basil's original version of "Mickey". Carola Häggkvist released a Swedish version of the song in 1983, which achieved success in Scandinavia. The Swedish version had lyrics written by Ingela "Pling" Forsman for the album Främling. In the same year, Mexican pop band Timbiriche included a Spanish adaptation of the song on their album En Concierto. Irish girl group B*Witched did a cover of the song that was included on the soundtrack of the film Bring It On (2000).

In 1983, "Weird Al" Yankovic released a parody of the song revolving around the 1950s sitcom I Love Lucy, titled after one of the show's main characters, Ricky Ricardo. The parody featured a duet with voice actress Tress MacNeille as Ricky's wife Lucy. The entire structure of the Run–D.M.C. song "It's Tricky" was consciously lifted from "Mickey". "Speed Drive" is a song by British singer Charli XCX from Barbie the Album, the soundtrack of the 2023 film Barbie, which interpolates the song.

American rapper Nitty sampled parts of "Mickey" for his single "Hey Bitty", released in the United States on January 18, 2005. In Australia, where Nitty's previous single "Nasty Girl" had topped the ARIA Singles Chart, "Hey Bitty" was released as a CD single on April 25, containing two remixes and album track "It's Official" as B-sides. The single reached number 11 on the ARIA Singles Chart and stayed in the top 50 for 12 weeks, finishing 2005 at number 86 on the Australian year-end chart.

The 2024 song "APT." by New Zealand and South Korean singer Rosé and American singer-songwriter Bruno Mars famously interpolates "Mickey" and its elements as part of its melody.

== See also ==
- List of Billboard Hot 100 number ones of 1982
- List of number-one singles in Australia during the 1980s
- List of number-one singles of 1982 (Canada)
