= List of dance styles =

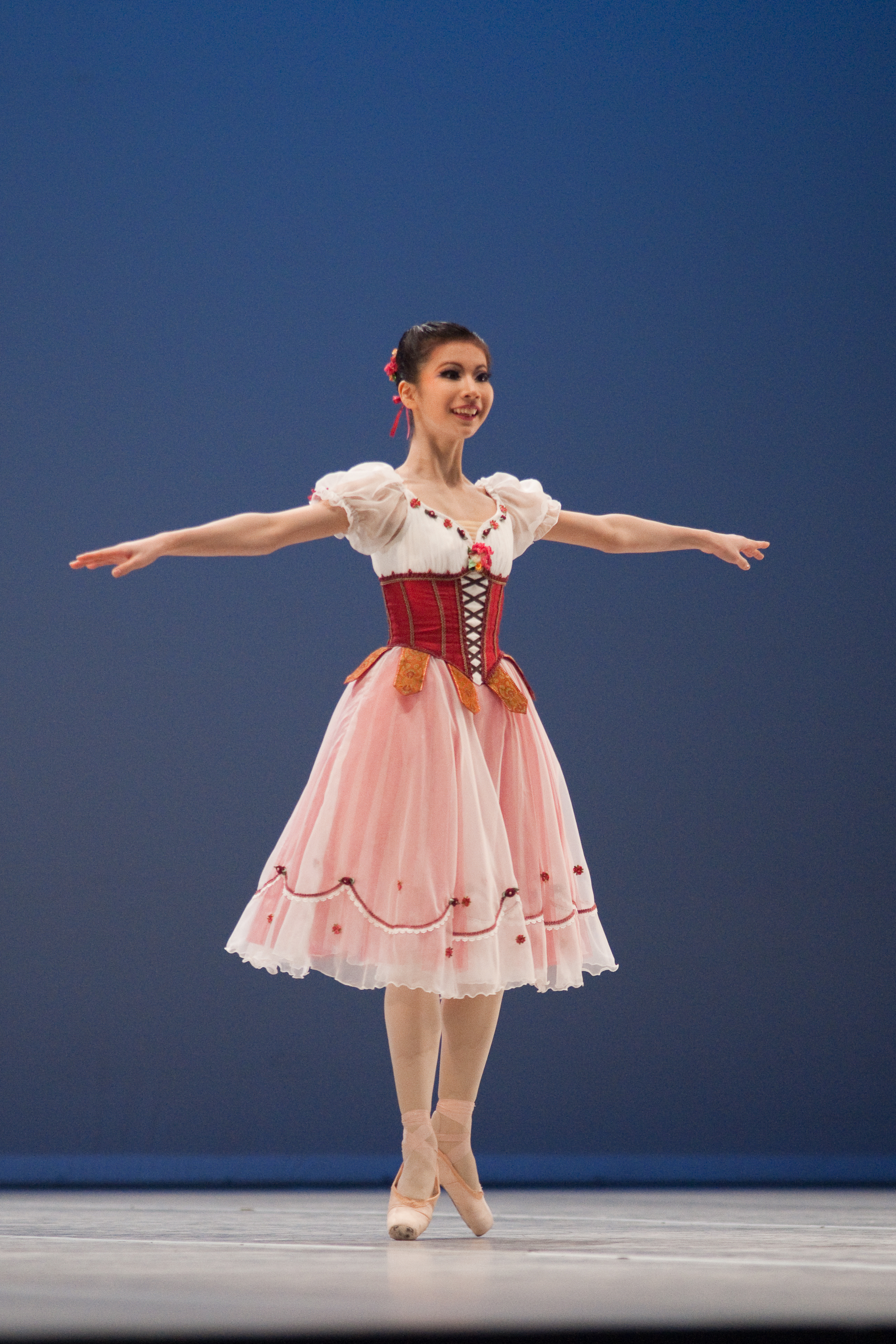
A ballet dancer.

This is a list of dance categories, different types, styles, or genres of dance.

For older and more region-oriented vernacular dance styles, see List of ethnic, regional, and folk dances by origin.

== Belly dance ==
- Belly dance
- Raqs Sharqi
- Turkish belly dance
- Oriental fusion
- Tribal belly dance
- American tribal fusion
- Saidi
- Kawleeya
- Khaleeji
- Baladi
- Dabkeh
- Romani dance

== Traditional Dances ==
- Haka
- Kagura
- Ritual dances of China
- Sacred dance
- Cham dance
- Drametse Ngacham
- Khon
- Prophetic dance
- Rejang dance
- Sanghyang
- Sufi whirling
- Worship dance

== Disco / Soul dance ==
- Bird
- Boogaloo and Electric boogaloo (Electric boogie)
- Boogie
- Boomerang
- Broadway
- Bump
- Bus stop
- Chicken
- Duck
- Waacking
- Fly
- Free step
- Hitch hike
- Horse
- Hurry Gurry
- Hustle
- Jerk
- Mashed Potato
- Monkey
- Penguin
- Philly dog
- Pony
- Popcorn
- Robot
- The Shake
- Shimmy
- Spank
- Watergate
- Watusi

== Free and improvised dance ==
- 5Rhythms
- Bogo lelo dance
- Contact improvisation
- Dance improvisation
- Ecstatic dance
- Free dance
- Fusion dance
- Interpretive dance
- Modern dance

== Historical dance ==
- Ballet
- Baroque dance
- Medieval dance
- Regency dance
- Renaissance dance
- Ultapulta dance
- Highland dance

== Latin dance / Rhythm ==
- American Rhythm
  - Bolero willy
  - East Coast Swing
  - Mambo
  - Rumba
- Bachata
- Cha Cha
- Corridos
- Cumbia
- Duranguense
- Forró
- International Latin
  - Argentine tango
  - Capoeira
    - Maculelê
  - Danza
  - Jive
  - Merengue
  - Milonga
  - Reggaeton
  - Rumba
    - Rueda
  - Salsa
  - Samba (ballroom dance)
  - Samba (Brazilian dance)
  - Samba de Gafieira
  - Zouk
- Lambada
- Pasodoble
- Quebradita
- Samba de roda
- Samba enredo
- Tejano dance
- Zapateado:
  - Zapateado (Mexico)
  - Zapateado (Spain)

== Novelty and fad dances ==
- Animal dance
- Bossa Nova
- Bunny hop
- Conga line
- Freddie
- Frug
- Go-go
- Hitch hike
- Jitterbug
- Lambada
- Madison
- Mule
- Pony
- The Shake
- Swim
- Floss
- Turkey trot
- Twist
- Watusi

== Social dance ==
Contra dancing

- Country dance, Contra dance
- Participation dance
  - Solo dance
  - Partner dance
    - Circle dance
    - grinding
    - Line dance
    - Round dance
    - Square dance
    - Slow dance

== Street dance / Electronic dance ==
- Hip-hop dance
  - Funk Styles
    - Electric boogaloo
    - Locking
    - Popping
    - Tutting
    - Robot dance
  - Breakdancing
  - Uprock
  - Cabbage patch dance
  - Cat Daddy
  - Dougie
  - Gangsta Walking
  - Jerkin'
  - Turfing
  - Krumping
  - Harlem shake
  - Litefeet
  - Lyrical hip-hop
- Flexing
- Majorette
- House dance
  - Footwork
  - Electro dance
  - Melbourne Shuffle
  - Jumpstyle
  - Vogue
- Waacking

== Swing dance ==
Balboa swing dancing.

- Balboa
- Big Apple
- Black Bottom
- Blues dance
- Boogie-woogie
- Breakaway
- Bugg
- Carolina Shag
- Charleston
- Collegiate Shag
- East Coast Swing
- Hand dancing
- Hand Jive
- Jitterbug
- Jive
- Jumpin' Joe
- Leroc
- Lindy Hop
- Modern Jive
- Rock and Roll
- Single Swing
- Skip jive
- St. Louis Shag
- West Coast Swing
- Robert R Dance
- Country Swing

== Other ==
- Acrobatic dance
- Bhangra
- Broadway dance
- Calypso
- Competitive dance
- Concert dance
- Contemporary dance
- Dance squad
- Fire dance
- Flamenco
- Flying Men dance
- Ice dance
- Jazz dance
- K-pop
- Liturgical dance
- Lyrical dance
- Nordic Folkdance
- Pole dance
- Rhythmic gymnastics
- Vintage dance
- Wuju
