= Hip-hop dance =

Street dance styles primarily performed to hip hop

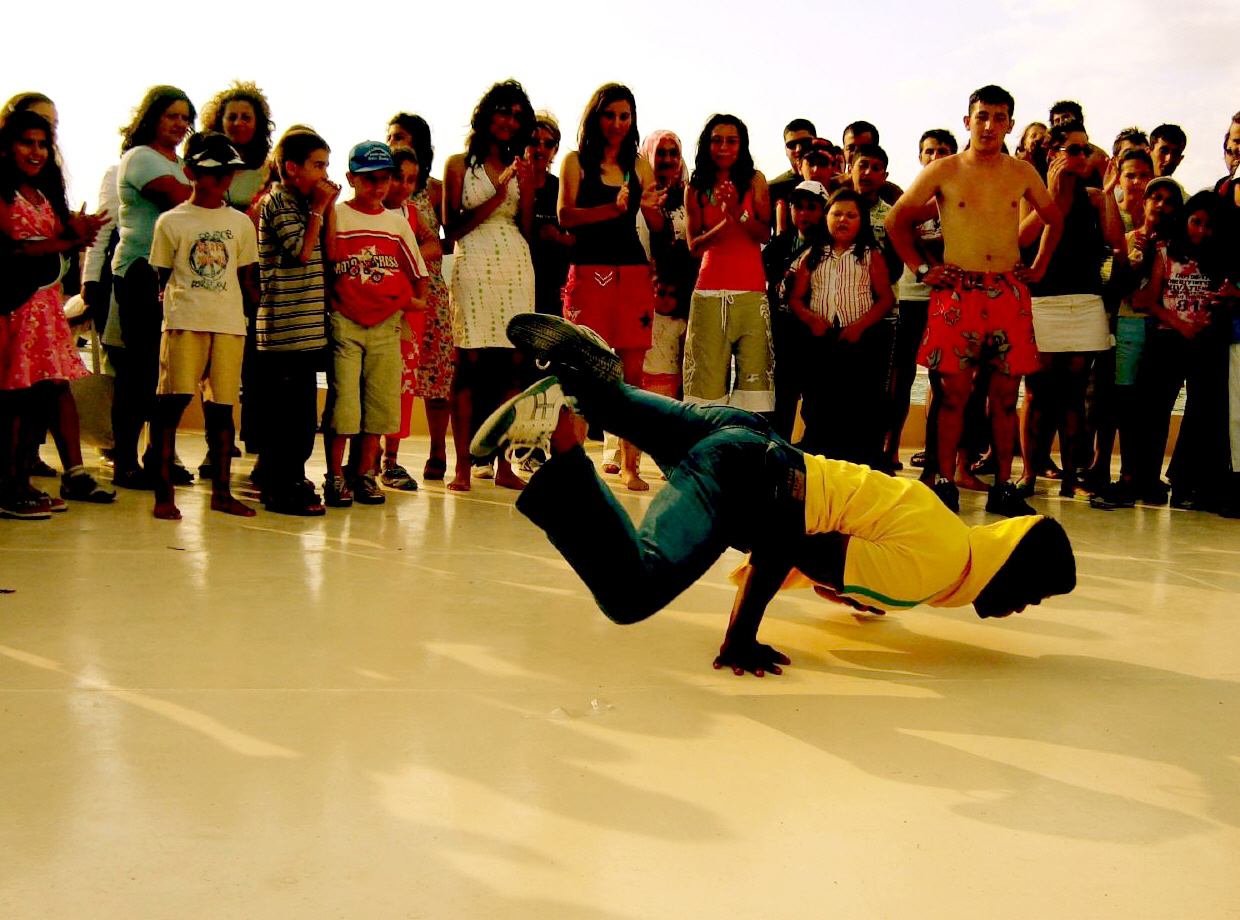
- A b-boy performing in Turkey surrounded by a group of spectators.

Primary influences
- Breaking – Locking – Popping

Derivative styles
- Street: Memphis Jookin' – Turfing – Jerkin' – Krumping
- Studio: Commercial/New Style – Jazz-funk – Lyrical hip hop

Cultural Markers
- Origins: Turntables – Hip hop music – Social dancing/Party dancing – African-American culture
- Attributes: Crews – Freestyle – Battles

Hip-hop dance is a range of street dance styles primarily performed to hip-hop music or that have evolved as part of hip-hop culture. It is influenced by a wide range of styles that were created in the 1970s and made popular by dance crews in the United States. The television show Soul Train and the 1980s films Breakin', Beat Street, and Wild Style showcased these crews and dance styles in their early stages, thereby giving hip-hop dance mainstream exposure.

The dance industry responded with a commercial, studio-based version of hip-hop—sometimes called "new style"—and a hip-hop-influenced style of jazz dance called "jazz-funk". Classically trained dancers developed these studio styles in order to create choreography from the hip-hop dances that were performed on the street. Because of this development, hip-hop dance is practiced in both dance studios and outdoor spaces.

The commercialization of hip-hop dance continued into the 1990s and 2000s with the production of several television shows and movies such as The Grind, Planet B-Boy, Rize, StreetDance 3D, America's Best Dance Crew, Saigon Electric, the Step Up film series, and The LXD, a web series. Though the dance is established in entertainment, including mild representation in theater, it maintains a strong presence in urban neighborhoods, which has led to the creation of street dance derivatives like Memphis jookin, turfing, jerkin', and krump. What distinguishes hip-hop from other forms of dance is that it is often "freestyle" (improvisational) in nature and hip-hop dance crews often engage in freestyle dance competitions—colloquially referred to as "battles".

Films, television shows, and the Internet have contributed to introducing hip-hop dance outside the United States. Since being exposed, educational opportunities and corporate dance competitions such as World of Dance and Hip Hop International have helped maintain its presence worldwide. Hip-hop dance can be a form of entertainment or a hobby. It can also be a way to stay active in competitive dance and a way to make a living by dancing professionally.

== History ==
Hip-hop dance is a fusion dance genre with influences from older street dance styles created in the 1970s. These include uprock, breaking, and the funk styles. Breaking was created in The Bronx, New York, in the early 1970s. In its earliest form, it began as elaborations on James Brown's "Good Foot" dance, which debuted in 1972. Breaking at this period was not primarily floor-oriented as seen today; it started out as toprock, which dancers perform while standing up. An influence on toprock was uprock, which was created in Brooklyn, New York. Uprock looks similar to toprock, but it is more aggressive and looks like a fight. Uprock is also performed with partners, but in toprock—and in breaking in general—each person takes turns dancing. In 1973, DJ Kool Herc popularized the break beat. A break beat is a rhythmic, musical interlude of a song that has been looped over and over again to extend that instrumental solo, because "breaks" were seen as the part of the song best to dance to. In the 1970s, DJs started using two copies of the same record to mix them, extending the break. This was known as Beat juggling. This interluding, which had previously been used in Funk and Soul songs, inspired this musical evolution. Kool Herc did this to provide a means for dancers who attended his parties to demonstrate their skills. B-boy and b-girl stands for "break-boy" and "break-girl"; b-boys and b-girls dance to the break of a record. Further influenced by martial arts and gymnastics, breaking went from being a purely upright dance style—toprock only—to becoming more floor-oriented.

At the same time that breaking was developing in New York, other styles were being created in California. The funk styles refer to several street dance styles created in California in the 1970s such as roboting, bopping, hitting, locking, bustin', popping, boogaloo, strutting, sac-ing, and dime-stopping. Out of all of these dances, Boogaloo is one of the oldest. It started out as a 1960s fad dance and was the subject of several songs released during that time such as "Do the Boogaloo" and "My Baby Likes to Boogaloo". From being a fad, it developed into a street dance style called Boogaloo in Oakland, California, as well as a separate music genre called Latin boogaloo. The most popular and widely practiced of the funk styles are locking and popping. The television show Soul Train played a large role in giving these styles commercial exposure. Both The Lockers and The Electric Boogaloos—dance crews responsible for the spread of locking and popping—performed on this show.

It is historically inaccurate to say that the funk styles were always considered hip-hop. In an interview with Racked, Moncell Durden, assistant dance professor at the University of Southern California, is quoted as saying "Hip-hop dance involves two dances: breaking and social dances. That's it. Nothing else is hip-hop." The funk styles were adopted into hip-hop in large part due to the media. The media identified these styles as "breakdance", which caused confusion about their origin. They were created on the west coast independent from breaking and were originally danced to funk music, rather than hip-hop music.

As breaking, locking, and popping gained popularity in the 1980s, hip-hop social dancing (party dancing) started to develop. Novelty and fad dances such as the Roger Rabbit, the Cabbage Patch, and the Worm appeared in the 1980s followed by the Humpty dance and the Running Man in the 1990s. (Note: The Running Man has African origins. It was performed at the Fela Kuti concert "Cross Examination" in Berlin in 1978.) The music of the day was the driving force in the development of these dances. For example, the 1980s rap group Gucci Crew II had a song called "The Cabbage Patch" that the dance of the same name was based on. 2000s-era social dances include the Cha Cha Slide, the Cat Daddy, and the Dougie. The previously mentioned dances are a sample of the many that have appeared since hip-hop developed into a distinct dance style. Like hip-hop music, hip-hop social dancing continues to change as new songs are released and new dances are created to accompany them.

== Primary influences ==
=== Breaking ===
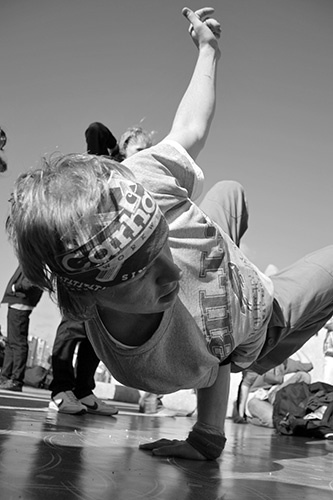
A b-boy in an airchair freeze at Street Summit 2006 in Moscow.

Breaking or b-boying, commonly known by its exonym as breakdancing, was created in the South Bronx, New York City during the early 1970s. It is considered the first hip-hop dance style. At the time of its creation, it was the only hip-hop dance style because Afrika Bambaataa classified it as one of the five pillars of hip-hop culture along with MCing (rapping), DJing (turntablism), graffiti writing (bombing), and knowledge. Though African Americans created breaking, Puerto Ricans maintained its growth and development when it was considered a fad in the late 1970s. In a 2001 interview Richard "Crazy Legs" Colón, the president of Rock Steady Crew, commented on how Puerto Ricans contributed to breaking: "I think the difference is when the brothas first started doing [it] and it was at its infancy they weren't doing acrobatic moves. That didn't come into play until more Puerto Ricans got involved in the mid 70s. We then took the dance, evolved it, and kept it alive. In '79 I was getting dissed. I would go into a dance and I would get dissed by a lot of brothas who would ask 'Why y'all still doing that dance? That's played out'. By 79, there were very few African American brothas that was doing this... We always maintained the flava. It was like a changing of the guard and all we did was add more flava to something that already existed." Breaking includes four foundational dances: toprock, footwork-oriented steps performed while standing up; downrock, footwork performed with both hands and feet on the floor; freezes, stylish poses done on your hands; and power moves, complex and impressive acrobatic moves. Transitions from toprock to downrock are called "drops."

Traditionally, breakers dance within a cypher or an Apache Line. A cypher is a circular shaped dance space formed by spectators that breakers use to perform or battle in. Cyphers work well for one-on-one b-boy or b-girl (break-boy/break-girl) battles; however, Apache Lines are more appropriate when the battle is between two crews—teams of street dancers. In contrast to the circular shape of a cypher, competing crews face each other in an Apache Line, challenge each other, and execute their burns (a move intended to humiliate the opponent, i.e. crotch grabbing).

Dance scholar Imani Kai Johnson examined oral histories of early hip-hop dancers to explore the relationship between life in the South Bronx during the 1970s and 1980s and the development of battling practices. Drawing on principles identified by early b-boy Trac2, Johnson grouped battling culture into four concepts: survivalism, strategizing, nomadism, and illusionism.

=== Locking ===
Locking, originally called Campbellocking, was created in 1969 in Los Angeles, California by Don "Campbellock" Campbell and popularized by his crew The Lockers. In addition to Campbell, the original members of The Lockers were Fred "Mr. Penguin" Berry, Leo "Fluky Luke" Williamson, Adolfo "Shabba-Doo" Quiñones, Bill "Slim the Robot" Williams, Greg "Campbellock Jr" Pope, and Toni Basil, who also served as the group's manager. At the 2009 World Hip Hop Dance Championships, Basil became the first female recipient of the Living Legend Award in honor of her role in giving locking commercial exposure.

Locking looks similar to popping, and the two are frequently confused by the casual observer. In locking, dancers hold their positions longer. The lock is the primary move used in locking. It is "similar to a freeze or a sudden pause." A locker's dancing is characterized by frequently locking in place and after a brief freeze moving again. According to Dance Spirit magazine, a dancer cannot perform both locking and popping simultaneously; thus, it is incorrect to call locking "pop-locking". While both styles are from Los Angeles, locking and popping are two distinct funk styles with their own histories, their own set of dance moves, their own pioneers, and their own competition categories. Locking is more playful and character-driven, whereas popping is more illusory. In popping, dancers push the boundaries of what they can do with their bodies. Locking has specific dance moves that distinguish it from popping and other funk styles. In the 2006 book Total Chaos, hip-hop historian Jorge "Popmaster Fabel" Pabon lists some of these moves, which include "the lock, points, skeeter [rabbits], scooby doos, stop 'n go, which-away, and the fancies." In addition, Lockers commonly use a distinctive dress style characterized by colorful clothing with stripes and suspenders.

=== Popping ===
Popping was derived from the earlier boogaloo street dance movement taking place in Oakland, California during the late 1960s. It was created in Fresno, California in the 1970s and popularized by Samuel "Boogaloo Sam" Solomon and his crew the Electric Boogaloos. It is based on the technique of quickly contracting and relaxing muscles to cause a jerk in a dancer's body, referred to as a pop or a hit. When performed correctly, each hit is synchronized to the rhythm and beats of the music. Popping is also used as an umbrella term to refer to a wide range of closely related illusionary dance styles such as strobing, liquid, animation, twisto-flex, and waving. Dancers often integrate these styles with standard popping to create a more varied performance. (Note: Two regional substyles that developed out of popping are jookin' (also called buckin) from Memphis, Tennessee and turfing from Oakland, California. Turfing borrows heavily from gliding.) In all of these subgenres it appears to the spectator that the body is popping. The difference between each subgenre is how exaggerated the popping is. In liquid, the body movements look like water. The popping is so smooth that the movements do not look like popping at all; they look fluid. The opposite of this is strobing (also called ticking) in which the movements are staccato and jerky.

Popping, as an umbrella term, also includes gliding. Gliding is a lower body dance performed with little to no movements in the chest or arms. In gliding a dancer appears as if they are drifting across the floor on ice. (Note: The moonwalk, called the backslide in popping context, is an example of sliding.) Opposite from gliding is tutting, an upper body dance that uses the arms, hands, and wrists to form right angles and create geometric box-like shapes. Tutting can be done primarily with the fingers rather than the arms. This method is called finger tutting. In both variations the movements are intricate, linear, and form 90° or 45° angles. In practice, tutting looks like the characters on the art of ancient Egypt, hence the name—a reference to King Tut.

While popping as an umbrella term is widely used by hip-hop dancers and in competitive hip-hop dancing, Timothy "Popin' Pete" Solomon of the Electric Boogaloos disagrees with the use of the word "popping" in this way. Many of these related styles (animation, liquid, tutting, etc.) can not be traced to one person or group. Solomon states "There are people who wave and there are people who tut. They're not popping. I say this to give the people who created other styles their just dues and their props."

== Derivative styles ==
Decades after breaking, locking, and popping became established, four new dance styles appeared. Three of them come from California and one comes from Tennessee. Memphis Jookin' was created in the 1980s in Memphis, Tennessee. It is an evolution of an older Memphis line dance called The Gangsta' Walk. According to Dance magazine, jookin is characterized by dancers "gliding footwork... popping and waving... [and] using the tips of their sneakers to balance on pointe." Gliding on tiptoes is fundamental to this dance. While watching a jookin' battle in Jackson, Tennessee, dance critic Alastair Macaulay observed that "the most evidently sensational feature of jookin is the extensive use of what a ballet observer is bound to call pointwork: the men, in sneakers, go onto tiptoe... many of the men not only rose onto point but also hopped, turned, ran and balanced on point." Jookers have traditionally practiced their moves at the Crystal Palace skating rink in Memphis, which is akin to how milongueros practice their moves in public spaces in Buenos Aires.

Turfing, an acronym for Taking Up Room on the Floor, was created in 2002 by Jeriel Bey in Oakland, California. Turfing is a fusion of miming and gliding that places heavy emphasis on storytelling (through movement) and illusion. Other than San Francisco Bay Area pride, turfing avoided becoming a fad due to local turf dance competitions and local youth programs that promote turfing as a form of physical activity.

The dance style, Jerkin', was popularized in 2009 by the New Boyz's rap song "You're a Jerk". This song went viral via their MySpace page before they had a manager or were signed to a record label. After hearing about the song, Los Angeles radio station Power 106 hired the New Boyz to perform at local high schools. These shows led to "You're a Jerk" entering the radio's playlist. Later the same year, rap duo Audio Push released the song and video "Teach Me How to Jerk", which showcased the different dance moves within jerkin' including the Reject—the Running Man done in reverse. Dancers who perform jerkin' typically wear bright colors, skinny jeans, Mohawks, and Vans sneakers. This trend echos locking dancers in the 1970s who traditionally wore suspenders and black and white striped socks. Of the dance, journalist Jeff Weiss from LA Weekly stated "For a youth culture weaned on the cult of individualism, jerkin' is its apotheosis." Similar to breaking, locking, and popping, jerkin's popularity spread through dance crews. For example, The Rej3ctz (crew) created both the Cat Daddy and the Reject dance moves.

Although jookin', turfing, and jerkin' generated regional support and media attention, none have reached the same zenith as krumping. Ceasare "Tight Eyez" Willis and Jo'Artis "Big Mijo" Ratti created krumping in the early 2000s in South Central, Los Angeles. It was only practiced in Los Angeles until it gained mainstream exposure after being featured in several music videos and showcased in the krumping documentary Rize. Rize was screened at several film festivals before it was commercially released in the summer of 2005. (Note: Rize had a limited release when shown in theaters.) Clowning, the less aggressive predecessor to krumping, was created in 1992 by Thomas "Tommy the Clown" Johnson. (Note: Clowning is not the same as the clown walk.) Johnson and his dancers would paint their faces and perform clowning for children at birthday parties or for the general public at other functions as a form of entertainment. In contrast, krumping focuses on highly energetic battles and movements, which Johnson describes as intense, fast-paced, and sharp. Of the dance, journalist Taisha Paggett from Dance magazine stated "If movement were words, [krumping] would be a poetry slam." Compared to breaking and the funk styles, jookin', turfing, jerkin', and krumping are relatively new. The music driving the dances and the cultural similarities between these street dance styles, the funk styles, and breaking have brought them together under the same subculture of hip-hop.

== Dance industry ==
=== Commercial/New Style ===
The dance industry responded to hip-hop dance by creating a commercial version of it. This urban choreography or studio hip-hop, sometimes called "new style", is the kind of hip-hop dance seen in rap, R&B, and pop music videos and concerts. From the point of view of someone deeply immersed in hip-hop culture, anything that looks like hip-hop dance that did not come from the streets and is not improvisational in nature is not a true hip-hop dance form. In an interview with Dance magazine, choreographer and hip-hop dance teacher Emilio "Buddha Stretch" Austin, Jr. described his point-of-view:

There are a lot of jazz dancers out there doing pseudo hip hop. A lot of teachers don't know the history, they're just teaching the steps. They're learning from videos, but they don't know the culture. If all you see is Britney Spears, you think that's hip hop, but that's never been hip hop. It's completely watered down. And studios could [sic] care less, because hip hop is one of their biggest moneymakers.

Stage performance can suppress improvisation, which defined hip-hop dance early in its development. Furthermore, meshing different dance styles together dissolves their structures and identities. In an interview with The Bronx Journal, choreographer and artistic director Safi Thomas expressed a similar qualm as Austin concerning hip-hop instruction within the studio:

In a lot of studios what you find is people just doing movement to hip-hop music. So if there's hip-hop music in the background, and they're moving, they're calling it a hip-hop class. The problem with that is let's say I wanted to teach a ballet class and I just come in, and I throw on Mozart, and I just start moving—and I'm not doing any of the foundational elements. I am not doing any of the movement vocabulary of ballet. I can not call that a ballet class and that's what happens in relation to hip-hop... within the studio realm there is no standard for the art form, and [the teachers] don't know what the foundational elements of the art are. They know nothing about popping, nothing about locking, nothing about boogaloo, breaking, or the hip-hop dance—the social dances—or any of that. They know none of the history which spans over 30–35 years, and so they pretty much cut off any type of edification that a dancer can have.

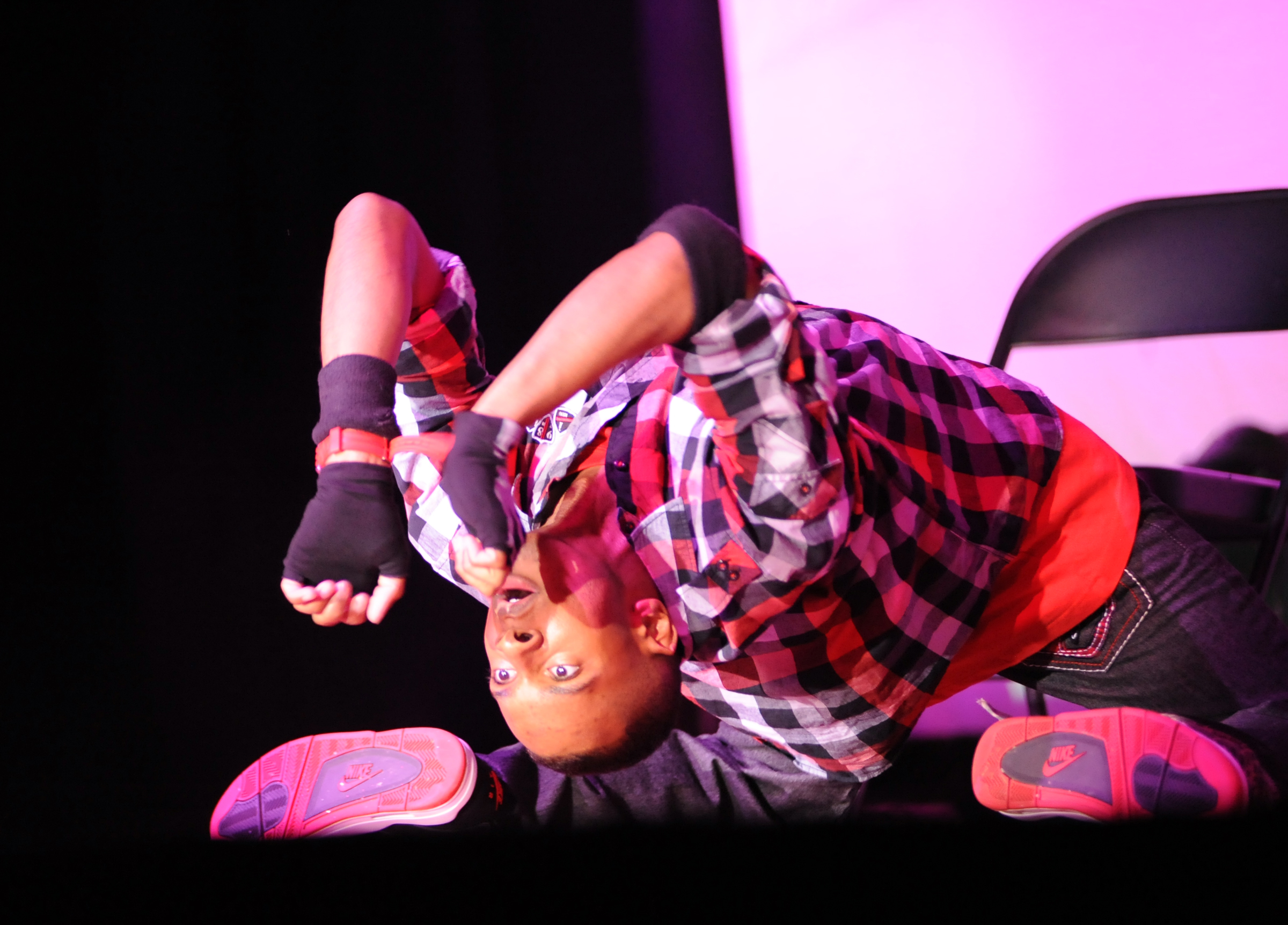
Hip-hop dancer Joseph Coine performing in 2011 in Wallace Theater at Fort Belvoir, Virginia.

The term "new style" was created by dancers outside the United States. According to Moncell Durden, adjunct professor at Drexel University and director of the film History and Concept of Hip-Hop Dance, the 1992 dance documentary Wreckin' Shop From Brooklyn was very influential to hip-hop dancers in France and Japan. These dancers wanted to move like the New York hip-hop dancers who were profiled in the documentary. They called the social dancing (party dancing) they saw "new style", which was short for "New York Style".

In the context of the commercial dance industry, hip hop (or new style hip-hop for dancers in France and Japan) is choreographed urban party dancing with studio technique added to it. From a technical aspect, it is characterized as hard-hitting involving flexibility and isolations—moving a specific body part independently from others.

"I would say that Toni Basil was sort of our Abe Saperstein in terms of how she was able to organize us into a professional dance troupe. I remember her teaching us how to count music. She was like, okay, we were like, count music? How do you count soul? It was crazy, you know?... all of our cues kind of went something like this, boom, pop, do boom, pada da boom, pada like that. And she was like, how do you guys get in sync like that? I said it's a feeling, you know?"

— Adolfo "Shabba-Doo" Quiñones;
The Lockers

A significant juncture in the development of hip-hop was the addition of eight-counts, a method of counting dance steps to stay in sync with the music. Toni Basil introduced this studio technique into locking in the 1970s. Basil was trained in ballet before being introduced to street dance by Don Campbell, the creator of locking and founding member of The Lockers dance crew. She is responsible for teaching the rest of The Lockers how to dance to counts. Traditionally hip-hop dance, or any form of street dance, is not performed to counts as these styles were created on the street rather than in a studio setting. Therefore, the introduction of counts was a pivotal move into bringing hip-hop dance from the street into the studio. Even with this addition, it would be years before commercial hip-hop developed into its current form.

A second important event in the development of hip-hop was the start of hip-hop dance instruction. Buddha Stretch was a pioneer in this field. He started teaching formal hip-hop dance classes in 1989 at Broadway Dance Center in New York City where he continues to teach today. Around the same time, hip-hop party dancing started to appear in music videos and on television—this was another important point in the development and commercialization of hip-hop. An early example of this is when Janet Jackson performed the Running Man in her 1989 music video for the song "Rhythm Nation", which was choreographed by street dancer Anthony Thomas. The dance was so popular during this time it was also performed by 1990s rappers MC Hammer and Vanilla Ice in their choreographed routines. Michael Jackson also used hip-hop in his 1992 music video "Remember the Time", which was choreographed by a then 21-year-old Fatima Robinson. At the time, Robinson was a street dancer with no formal training and "Remember the Time" was her first music video job. According to MTV.com, "Dances have always been a part of hip-hop culture — from the running man to the Soulja Boy dance..." and this era was the start of commercial hip-hop choreography as it looks today: dance routines are not specific to one genre (strictly popping, strictly locking, or strictly breaking) but rather an amalgamation of urban party dancing with studio technique added to it.

=== Jazz-funk ===
Another style the dance industry created in response to hip-hop was jazz-funk. Jazz-funk (also called street-jazz) is a hybrid of hip-hop and jazz dance. This style was shown in its early form on a sketch comedy series called In Living Color. The resident dance troupe, The Fly Girls, opened and closed every show with a hip-hop and jazz performance choreographed by Rosie Perez. R&B singer Beyoncé uses this style. Korean dance crew Prepix also uses this style. They have choreographed for K-pop singers Jay Park and G.NA as well as for K-pop boy bands 2PM and B2ST. Although jazz-funk borrows from hip-hop dance, it is not considered a style of hip-hop because the foundational movements are jazz. In hip-hop—even in lyrical hip-hop—there are no pirouettes or arabesques and dancers do not perform on relevé (on the balls of the feet). However, these methods are mostly used in jazz-funk and in jazz dance in general.

=== Business developments ===
Other developments in the dance industry occurred in response to the growing popularity of hip-hop. On the traveling convention circuit there were tap, ballet, and jazz dance conventions, but there were none specifically for hip-hop. The same void existed in dancewear. There was dancewear for tap, ballet, and jazz dancers but none for hip-hop dancers. Monsters of Hip Hop and Nappytabs dancewear were formed to answer to both needs. Nappytabs is the first line of hip-hop dancewear. Because their clothing is made for hip-hop dancers, they do not sell leotards, unitards, tights, or leg warmers. Their line consists of tank tops, shorts, t-shirts, sweat pants, harem pants, and hoodies. Monsters of Hip Hop (MOHH) was founded in 2003 in Baltimore, Maryland by Andy Funk, Becky Funk, and Angie Servant. The convention is dedicated exclusively to hip-hop instruction. Fatima Robinson, Stefan "Mr. Wiggles" Clemente, and Timothy "Popin' Pete" Solomon have taught classes at MOHH in the past. Every year, the convention brings together its top student dancers for a professionally choreographed showcase in Los Angeles called Monsters of Hip Hop: The Show.

MOHH may have been the first hip-hop dance convention, but it is not the only one that exists. Urban Dance Camp (UDC) is a six-week-long German-based dance convention held every year in Lörrach, a small town on the border of France and Switzerland. In a report on the event by a local paper, Bettina Kraft, the manager of UDC, estimated that 85% of the participants were from outside Germany. In 2009 Kraft created Urban Dance Showcase, a parallel event to UDC reserved only for performances by professional choreographers, dance crews, and UDC teachers. Dancers such as Shaun Evaristo, Les Twins, I.aM.mE, b-boy Lilou, and b-boy Hong 10 have performed at the showcase in the past.

Aside from dancewear and conventions, developments in agency representation occurred as well. Although limited, representation for individual dancers had existed since the 1980s at the beginning of the music video era due to the pioneering work of talent agent Julie McDonald. (Note: Representation for dance groups existed before the music video era. In the 1970s, The Lockers were represented by ICM Talent Agency.) Whereas HeadNod Agency was the first UK-based agency to represent street dancers in the commercial world, others followed such as ProDance and Superbad Talent who were created to exclusively represent street dancers.

== Entertainment ==
=== Movies ===
The entertainment industry has been largely responsible for introducing hip-hop dance to mainstream audiences around the world. Early hip-hop films Wild Style, Beat Street, and Breakin' were made in the 1980s. When Wild Style opened in Japan, Rock Steady Crew performed breaking in Tokyo's Harajuku shopping district to promote the film. Wild Style was the first movie centered around hip-hop culture; however, Flashdance was the first commercially released film to feature breaking. (Note: Wild Style was produced in New York City and independently released.) In 1984, Beat Street was released in West Germany and screened at the Cannes Film Festival, which helped to introduce breaking, graffiti writing, and turntablism to this part of Europe. Breakin' and Breakin' 2: Electric Boogaloo brought the funk styles to the cinema. Breaking, locking, popping, and waacking were performed in these films. At this time in the 1980s, the United States was not the only country producing hip-hop films. In 1985, Yuen Woo-ping directed a hip-hop themed romantic comedy in Hong Kong called Mismatched Couples starring Donnie Yen. Another hip-hop film, Electro Rock, was released the same year in the United Kingdom. This film featured a then 14-year-old Hanifa "Bubbles" McQueen Hudson, the UK's first b-girl.

Several hip-hop dance films were produced after the millennium. The Freshest Kids: A History of the B-Boy, Neukölln Unlimited, B-Girl, Bouncing Cats, Planet B-Boy, and Battle of the Year: The Dream Team all showcase breaking. Films such as Honey, Save the Last Dance, You Got Served, the Step Up film series, StreetDance 3D, Hype Nation, Saigon Electric, Berlin Dance Battle 3D, and ABCD: Any Body Can Dance showcase all forms of hip-hop dance, especially new style hip-hop. Rize, The Heart of Krump, and Shake City 101 are documentaries about krumping. All of these movies and documentaries are examples of films where the plot and theme surround hip-hop dance and how it affects the characters' lives. Bouncing Cats is the story of b-boy Abraham "Abramz" Tekya who uses b-boying to empower youth in Uganda. In 2010, the film won "Outstanding Achievement in Documentary Filmmaking" at Newport Beach Film Festival and "Best Documentary Feature" at Urbanworld Film Festival. Saigon Electric was Vietnam's first hip-hop film. It was written, produced, and directed by Vietnamese-American filmmaker Stephane Gauger. The film is about two female dancers (a ribbon dancer and a hip-hop dancer) and how their respective romances, the threat of their community center being torn down, and the stress of an upcoming dance battle affects their friendship. The film was choreographed by Viet Max and Ricky Cole. In 2012, it won a Golden Kite Prize (the Vietnamese equivalent of The Oscars/BAFTAs) for "Best Film" and "Best Actress".

=== Television ===
Before reaching movie audiences, hip-hop dance was already being broadcast on television. Soul Train was a syndicated, music variety show that featured social dancing and performances by African-American soul, funk, and R&B singers. The show was broadcast in South Korea via the US Armed Forces Korea Network. Before officially becoming a crew, The Lockers made several appearances on this show. After becoming a crew, The Electric Boogaloos also appeared on the show. Soul Train premiered in 1970. During its 36 year run, the resident freestyle dancers were referred to as the Soul Train Gang. Auditions were held in 1971 when the show moved from Chicago, Illinois to Los Angeles, California. Dancers who wanted to get on Soul Train after this time had to rely on word-of-mouth recommendations from dancers who were already employed by the show. A regular feature during the broadcast was the Soul Train Line. To participate, the dancers formed two lines of equal length facing each other with a large space in between them. Each dancer in line would take their turn dancing down the middle.

Other music variety shows on television at this time were American Bandstand, Solid Gold, and Top of the Pops. Unlike Soul Train, which focused on soul and funk, these shows promoted Top 40 music and pop acts. Solid Gold employed a permanent dance troupe called the Solid Gold Dancers who performed choreographed routines to musical performances. Lucinda Dickey, an actress and dancer who played the lead role in the Breakin' films, appeared on the show during the 1982–1983 season as a Solid Gold dancer. In 1983, street dancers Marc "Mr. Freeze" Lemberger from Rock Steady Crew, Timothy "Popin' Pete" Solomon and Dane "Robot Dane" Parker from the Electric Boogaloos, and locking dancers Alpha "Omega" Anderson and Lewis "Deputy" Green also appeared on Solid Gold during a performance to the song "What a Feeling" from the movie Flashdance. In 1982 during a performance in London on Top of the Pops, street dancer Jeffrey Daniel performed popping and the backslide during the song "A Night to Remember". This was the first time popping was shown on British television, thus spreading its popularity in the United Kingdom. A year later, Michael Jackson also performed the backslide during a performance of "Billie Jean" on the Motown 25 TV special. He called it the moonwalk and his performance spread its popularity all over the world to much larger extent than Daniel's performance did. It was Jeffrey Daniel who taught Michael Jackson how to do the backslide/moonwalk. (Note: Jeffrey Daniel learned the backslide from The Electric Boogaloos.)

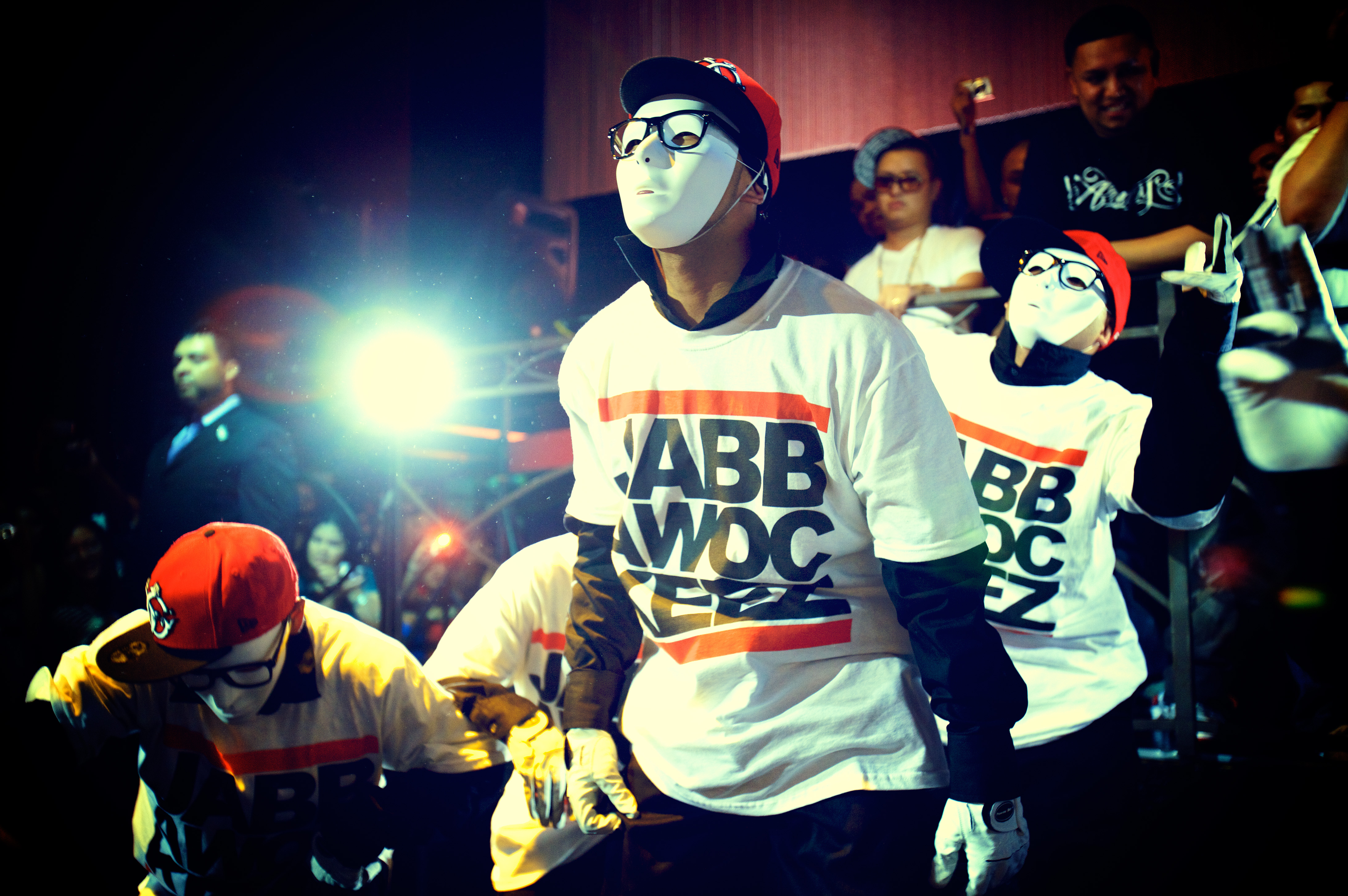
The JabbaWockeez, winners of the first season of America's Best Dance Crew, performing in 2008 at Vivid Nightclub in San Jose, California.

A few hip-hop dance shows appeared on television in the 1990s such as 1991's The Party Machine with Nia Peeples (Note: Prior to The Party Machine, Nia Peeples hosted the US version of Top of the Pops.) and 1992's The Grind. Several hip-hop dance shows premiered in the 2000s including (but not limited to) Dance Fever, Dance 360, The Wade Robson Project, MTV Dance Crew, America's Best Dance Crew, Dance on Sunset, and Shake It Up. In 2006, MTV France documented the creation of a dance crew for an original series called MTV Dance Crew. Viewers were able to see the crew from auditions to the selection of the final eight who were subsequently named Original Soul. Original Soul was coached by three professional choreographers who mentored them and helped refine their dancing. Over the course of 32 episodes they routinely participated in professional dance battles including the popping battle at Juste Debout, the Seven 2 Smoke battle at The Notorious IBE, and b-boy battles at Chelles Battle Pro. B-boy Lilou, b-boy crew Phase T, and promoter Bruce Ykanji (the founder of Juste Debout) all made appearances in the show.

The founders of Hip Hop International, Howard and Karen Schwartz, created the reality hip-hop dance competition America's Best Dance Crew (ABDC) in 2008. On the show, different crews competed in dance challenges against each other every week. ABDC contributed to the exposure of several crews such as Jabbawockeez, Quest, Beat Freaks, Poreotics, and Kinjaz. These crews now have official websites, work with musical artists, and perform at live events. The JabbaWockeeZ had a show in Las Vegas, Nevada called MÜS.I.C. at the Monte Carlo Resort and Casino. MÜS.I.C. was the first hip-hop dance stage show on the Las Vegas Strip. In 2012, the Jabbawockeez performed the show during a five-month residency at the Jupiters Hotel and Casino in Gold Coast, Queensland, Australia. Both Poreotics and Hokuto "Hok" Konishi from Quest were nominated for a 2011 MTV Video Music Award for Best Choreography. Poreotics was nominated with singer Bruno Mars for his video "The Lazy Song". Hok was nominated for LMFAO's video "Party Rock Anthem"; the rest of Quest crew appeared in the video as featured dancers.

In contrast to ABDC, individual dancers from all backgrounds compete on the reality dance competition So You Think You Can Dance (SYTYCD) and World of Dance (WOD). It has a similar premise to the Idol series of singing competitions with initial auditions leading to the selection of a winner over the course of several episodes. In 2008, poppers Robert "Mr. Fantastic" Muraine and Phillip "Pacman" Chbeeb auditioned during season four of the US SYTYCD series. Neither made it to the final "Top 20", but the judges were so impressed with their dancing that both were invited back to participate in a popping battle against each other on the show's live finale. According to Muraine, this was the first popping battle that was nationally televised. After the battle, hip-hop dancer Joshua Allen was declared the winner of season four of the competition. The same year Mona-Jeanette Berntsen, a hip-hop dancer from Norway, won the first season of So You Think You Can Dance Scandinavia. In 2017, hip hop duo Les Twins won the inaugural season of World of Dance. Hip hop dance crew The Lab won the following year.

Hip-hop dance has also been popular among viewers of the Got Talent series. French hip-hop dancer Salah won the first season of Incroyable Talent in 2006. French b-boy Junior won the second season in 2007. In 2008, hip-hop dancer George Sampson won Britain's Got Talent, Danish popping and roboting duo Robot Boys won Talent 2008 (da), and hip-hop dance crew Quick won the Norwegian version of the show. After George Sampson, dance crew Diversity won the next season of Britain's Got Talent in 2009. (Note: George Sampson and Diversity appeared in the film StreetDance 3D.) The same year, Brazilian crew D-Efeitos won Qual é o Seu Talento? (What's Your Talent?). In 2010, Justice Crew won Australia's Got Talent. After signing a recording contract with Sony Music Australia, Justice Crew shot a video for their single "Dance with Me" featuring rapper Flo Rida and America's Best Dance Crew alumni Beat Freaks. In 2015, nine years after he won Incroyable Talent, hip-hop dancer Salah won the fourth season of Arabs Got Talent.

=== Theater ===
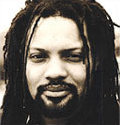
Choreographer and artistic director Rennie Harris in 2011.

Though hip-hop dancing is established on film and on television, it has not gained the same level of exposure in theater. This may be due to the fact that the dance is performed more in film and in television than it is in a theatrical setting. B-boy and popper Stefan "Mr. Wiggles" Clemente and hip-hop historian Jorge "Popmaster Fabel" Pabon were involved in hip-hop theater at its inception. Their dance company, GhettOriginal, produced the first hip-hop stage shows: 1991's off Broadway musical So! What Happens Now? and 1995's Jam on the Groove. Both shows were performed by the Rock Steady Crew, Magnificent Force, and the Rhythm Technicians. Aside from the pioneers in New York City was Rennie Harris' Puremovement hip-hop theater company. Harris founded Puremovement in 1992 in Philadelphia, Pennsylvania. One of Puremovement's theater shows Rome & Jewels won two Black Theater Alliance Awards and three Bessie Awards. In 2012, Harris and his company toured Egypt, Israel, and the Palestinian territories as part of Dance Motion USA, a program sponsored by the US State Department to showcase American dance to other countries and promote cultural exchange.

German b-boy pioneer Niels "Storm" Robitzky has his performance roots in hip-hop theater. In 1991, Robitzky—who went by the name "Swipe"—left Germany with his crew Battle Squad for New York City to look for b-boy legends they could study under. When he got to New York, he met b-boy Gabriel "Kwikstep" Dionisio who personally mentored him and introduced him to New York techniques. While in New York, he also learned about the funk styles from Clemente. Clemente and Dionisio knew each other since Dionisio was an original member of both GhettOriginal and the Rhythm Technicians. A year later in 1992, Robitzky performed with GhettOriginal at the Kennedy Center in Washington D.C. and at the Lincoln Center in New York City. It was Dionisio who gave Robitzky a new name, "Storm". In 2000, he wrote a book called Von Swipe zu Storm: Breakdance in Deutschland (From Swipe to Storm: Breakdance in Germany).

Dancers in the United Kingdom have had success in hip-hop theater. In 2006, hip-hop dance company Boy Blue Entertainment won a Laurence Olivier Award for their show Pied Piper. In 2008, Into the Hoods became the first hip-hop theater show to perform in London's West End. It eventually went on to become the West End's longest running dance show ever.

=== Online content ===
YAK Films is a three-man team that films urban dance around the world. It was founded in Oakland, California by Yoram Savion and Kash Gaines. Their first videos were of the Turf Feinz dance crew performing turfing—a regional hip-hop dance style from Oakland. After generating significant views on YouTube, they started YAK (Yoram And Kash) Films and added music producer Ben "B'zwax" Tarquin to the team. From shooting videos only in the United States, they were able to easily transition to covering dance events in Europe due to Savion's dual French citizenship. In 2009, they filmed Battle of the Year's first one-on-one b-boy competition, and in 2010 they filmed dance battles at Juste Debout, a French street dance competition. Some of their more popular videos have been featured in Oakland Local and the Huffington Post.

Juba Films was founded in Germany by Julien Bam and Gong Bao. Rather than film freestyle content, Juba ("Ju"lien and "Ba"o) produces short films with a storyline. For their short b-boy film "More Than Bread", they won first place at the 7th International Online Dance Festival in 2011. Both Juba Films and YAK Films appeared at The Notorious IBE's New Dance Media Conference discussing the relationship between street dance and visual arts. Although Juba Films has won an award and YAK Films has booked high-profile events, they are not the only film production teams distributing hip-hop dance videos on the Internet. House of Crews, Strife TV, Pacific Rim Video Press, ProDance TV, Battle Fest Extreme, Urban Dance Show, Ocke Films, World of Dance Network, and Canal Street TV also produce hundreds of high-quality hip-hop dance content. (Note: CanalStreet.tv is owned by Canal+, a French premium television channel.)

The Legion of Extraordinary Dancers (The LXD) was a good-versus-evil themed web series created by Jon M. Chu (Note: Jon Chu also directed the movies Step Up 2: The Streets and Step Up 3D.) about a group of dancers who discover they have super powers through their dance moves. Each character specializes in one dance style. Consequently, a wide range of styles are displayed including krumping, tutting, breaking, locking, boogaloo, and popping. The majority of the dancing shown in the series is hip-hop; however, other styles were also performed including jazz, tap, and ballet. AdvertisingAge.com gave the series a favorable review stating "...each episode of 'LXD' packs a wealth of narrative sophistication into its eight or nine minutes. Combine this with the theater-worthy production values and a cast that exerts itself to an ungodly extent, and the end result is – pun time! – extraordinary."

== International competitions ==
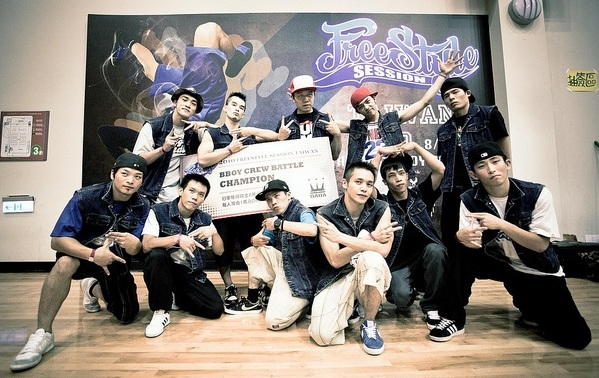
The 2010 winners of the b-boy crew battle at Freestyle Session Taiwan.

- UK B-Boy Championships was founded by DJ Hooch in 1996 in London. There are four world championship titles: breaking crew champions, solo b-boy champion, solo popping champion, and solo hip-hop champion. The world finals also include the "Fresh Awards" (best dressed), which are hosted and judged every year by Richard "Crazy Legs" Colón—the president of Rock Steady Crew. In 2011, DJ Hooch wrote a book about the competition called B-Boy Championships: From Bronx to Brixton.
- Freestyle Session was founded in 1997 in California by graffiti writer and DJ Chris "Cros1" Wright. It is the largest breaking competition in the United States. The main competitive event is for b-boy crews, but there are also popping and locking competitions for solo competitors. Although the US is the flagship location for Freestyle Session, it is not the only country where it is held. Promoters outside the US pay Cros1 to use Freestyle Session's name and fly him to their location to judge the competition. Using this method, Freestyle Session has been held in 18 other countries including Poland, Russia, Switzerland, and Venezuela.
- Hip Hop International (HHI) was founded in 2002 in the United States by Howard and Karen Schwartz. There are two categories of competitions: World Battles and World Hip Hop Dance Championship. Within the World Battles category, there are four titles including three-on-three breaking champions, one-on-one popping champion, one-on-one locking champion, and one-on-one all styles (freestyle) champion. The World Hip Hop Dance Championship is for hip-hop crews. There are four divisions: junior (ages 8–12), varsity (13–17), adult (18+), and mega crew (all ages). Each crew must have at least five but not more than nine people (mega crew must have 15–40) and must perform a routine that showcases three styles of hip-hop dance. For the 2009 competition, there were 120 crews representing 30 countries. HHI also created the USA Hip Hop Dance Championship and the television show America's Best Dance Crew.
- Juste Debout was founded in 2002 by Bruce Ykanji in Paris. Competition categories include popping, hip-hop, locking, house, toprock, and experimental. Breaking is not included to put more focus on dance styles performed while standing up, hence the name (French for Just Standing). There are not any team trophies at Juste Debout. The experimental and toprock categories are only for solo dancers; popping, new style, locking, and house are for duos. In 2008, Ingrid "Shéyen" Gamboa, the editor-in-chief of Juste Debout magazine, wrote a book called Hip-hop: L'histoire de la danse (Hip Hop: A history of the dance).
- United Dance Organisation (UDO) was founded in 2002 in the United Kingdom. UDO operates the British Street Dance Championships, the European Street Dance Championships, the North American Championships, and the World Street Dance Championships. The European championships are held in Germany rather than in the UK.
- Street Dance Kemp Europe (SDK Europe) is a competition and dance convention founded in 2004 in Jedovnice, Czech Republic. There is a hip-hop crew battle and solo battles for house, krumping, locking, hip-hop male, and hip-hop female dancers. SDK Europe begins every year in the summer and lasts seven days. Daytime hours are reserved primarily for dance workshops and classes taught by an international pool of instructors; competitive events are held at night. All of the classes, workshops, and competitive events are held outside.
- EuroBattle was founded in 2005 in Portugal by Max from Momentum crew. There are five competitive events for solo dancers including b-boying, b-girling, hip-hop, locking, and popping. The international final is held in Porto but the winner of the Spanish qualifying tournament also gets to compete at the UK B-Boy Championships in London.
- World Supremacy Battlegrounds is a hip-hop dance competition based in Australia. The heritage of World Supremacy Battlegrounds goes back to 2002 when it began as GROOVE, a local hip-hop competition held in Sydney. Over the three years that followed, the competition was renamed Battlegrounds and went national to include dance crews from all over Australia. It became international in 2006 when crews from the Philippines, Japan, and New Zealand entered the competition. There are four dance crew categories: open (all ages), junior (12 and under), varsity (12–18), and monster (all ages, 20–40 members). For the 2011 competition, teams from Indonesia, Thailand, Singapore, Malaysia, Vietnam, the Philippines, Japan, Guam, New Zealand, Samoa, and South Africa came to compete.
- World of Dance Tour (WOD) was founded in 2008 by Myron Marten and David Gonzales in Pomona, California. It differs from other competitions because there is no final championship. WOD travels to different cities in the United States, Canada, and Europe and holds a competition in each location; therefore, WOD distinguishes itself as a tour. Each tour stop is a stand-alone competition; they are all related to each other in name only. In 2013, WOD traveled to New York City, Vallejo, Seattle, Vancouver, Berlin, Dallas, Toronto, San Diego, Montreal, Eindhoven, Boston, Orlando, Houston, Chicago, Seattle, Honolulu, Los Angeles, Union City, and Antwerp. WOD reached a larger audience in 2017 when NBC started airing a television show based on the competition.
- World Dance Colosseum is a two-on-two dance competition founded in Japan. There are five two-on-two world championship titles: b-boying, locking, popping, hip-hop, and house. Japanese dancers qualify for the international final through preliminary tournaments held in the country but foreign dancers do not qualify through tournaments because 30 of the top-ranked foreign dancers are automatically invited to participate in the final. At the final, the winning duos from the Japanese tournaments compete against the top-ranked foreign duos to determine who is the best.
- Vibe Dance Competition is a choreography competition that was started by Joseph Lising in 1995 as a Greek Talent Show at UC Irvine. It later evolved into one of the biggest competitions for choreography hip hop teams in the world, hosting teams from all over the US, Canada, the Philippines, and Japan.

== Education ==
In 2004, Safi Thomas founded the Hip-Hop Dance Conservatory (HHDC) in New York City. Thomas' goal was to provide a comprehensive education to hip-hop dancers that was comparable to what ballet, modern, and jazz dancers experience at their respective institutions. HHDC provides a formal curriculum with dance classes (breaking, freestyle, locking, etc.) and academic classes (dance theory, physiology, kinesiology, etc.) to people who want to pursue hip-hop dance as a career. It is the only educational institution in the United States that is exclusively dedicated to hip-hop dance instruction. HHDC does not grant degrees. It is a non-profit organization and repertory company that grants certifications to dancers that complete the three-year program.

Three years later in 2007, the University of East London's Center for Performing Arts Development (CPAD) started intake for the only bachelor's degree program in the world specializing in hip-hop, urban, and global dance forms. The CPAD's program also lasts three years, but it is not exclusive to hip-hop. Students also study African dance, kathak, Bollywood, and capoeira.
