= Gloving =

Modern dance form

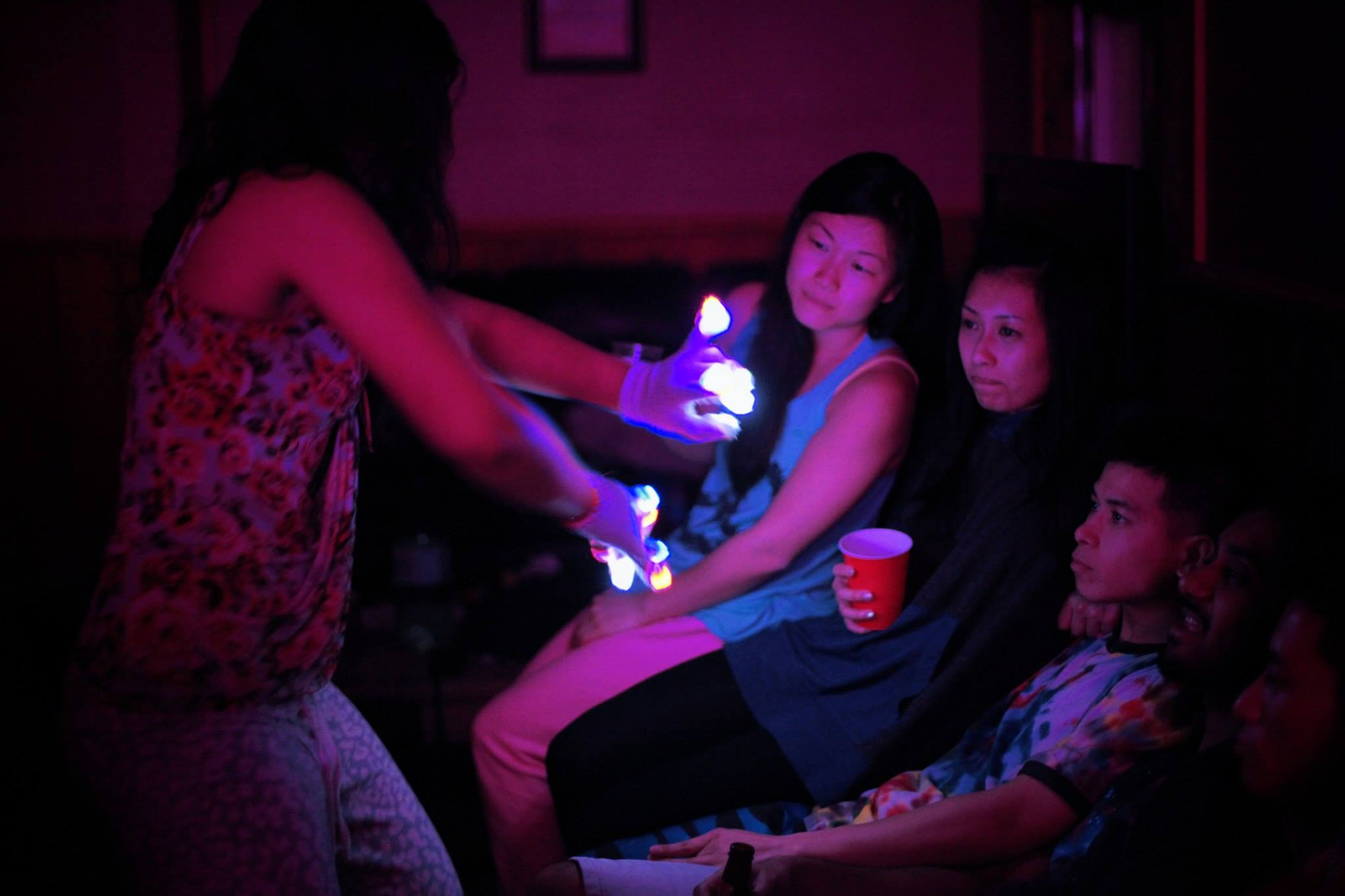
A gloving dance

Gloving is a form of modern dance which involves the use of fingertip light-emitting diode (LED) lights to accentuate patterns.

== History ==
Gloving is believed to have started in the 1990s and early 2000s, with video evidence of it from 2006 existing.

Gloving performances are called light-shows, and primarily performed at raves. Elements of hip-hop dance including liquiding, finger-tutting, and popping have influenced gloving, and many of the same dance concepts and techniques can be applied to the dance form. Prior to gloving, rave attendees twirled glow sticks, and before the addition of LED lights, glovers used plain white Mickey Mouse gloves, which reflected black light frequently employed at shows. Specially-made gloves are manufactured for gloving, such as by the California company EmazingLights, which appeared on Shark Tank and was one of the fastest-growing private companies in 2014.

In 2010, an electronic dance music promotions company, Insomniac Events, banned gloving from all its events citing drug connotations and safety issues. Insomniac chief executive officer Pasquale Rotella stated, "Between the fire marshals and the media perception, [gloving] was putting the events in jeopardy and was not helping the health of the culture."

== Revival ==
In late 2025, TikTok users outside of the gloving community started to make internet memes where they made gloving seem more intense than it is. This made members of the real community get defensive about their hobby, which only fueled users to make satirical "Gloving War" videos about who should be able to do the sport. As the meme went on, users began saying the punishment for disrespecting the community was getting degloved, which was reinterpreted as removing one's glove as a symbolic ban from the dance. Some memes put gloving as a rival hobby to sliding. Sliding is a maneuver where a person with metal plating on their hands and knees slides across concrete towards a person, commonly performed by actors in haunted amusement parks.

== See also ==
- Finger-tutting
