= Electric boogaloo =

Electric boogaloo may refer to:

- Electric boogaloo (dance), a dance style involving popping techniques
  - The Electric Boogaloos, a street dance crew founded in Fresno, California in 1977
- Breakin' 2: Electric Boogaloo, a 1984 American dance musical film directed by Sam Firstenberg
  - "Electric Boogaloo" (song), lead single from the 1984 film soundtrack recorded by Ollie & Jerry
- Five Iron Frenzy 2: Electric Boogaloo, a 2001 album by the band Five Iron Frenzy
- Danza II: Electric Boogaloo, a 2007 album by the Tony Danza Tapdance Extravaganza
- Electric Boogaloo: The Wild, Untold Story of Cannon Films, a 2014 Australian documentary about The Cannon Group
- "Chardee MacDennis 2: Electric Boogaloo", a 2016 episode from the eleventh season of It's Always Sunny in Philadelphia
- Electric Boogaloo, a zombie hero in Plants vs. Zombies Heroes
- Electric Boogaloo, the third level of Jazz Jackrabbit 2 - Episode 3: Flashback

== See also ==
- "Electric Boogie", a 1983 song
- Boogaloo (disambiguation)
- Boogaloo (funk dance), a freestyle, improvisational street dance movement
- "3rd Acts: ? vs. Scratch 2 ... Electric Boogaloo", a 1999 track by The Roots from Things Fall Apart
