= Jazz-funk dance =

Style of dance

Jazz-funk dance, also called street jazz, is a hybrid of hip-hop and jazz dance. This style was shown in its early form on the sketch comedy series In Living Color. The resident dance troupe, the Fly Girls, of which Jennifer Lopez was a member, opened and closed every show with a hip-hop and jazz performance choreographed by Rosie Perez. This style of dance remains popular today, and has been used in music videos by Beyoncé, Paula Abdul, Gwen Stefani, and Janet Jackson.

Although jazz-funk borrows from hip-hop dance, it is not considered a style of hip-hop because the foundational movements are jazz. In hip-hop—even in lyrical hip-hop—there are no pirouettes or arabesques, and dancers do not perform on relevé (on the balls of the feet). However, these methods are used in jazz-funk and in jazz dance in general. In hip-hop, you can see large steps and sweeping movements with the hands; in jazz-funk, all movements are small, smoothly and beautifully replacing each other. In hip-hop, the initial position of the body implies a soft, slightly bent back. Jazz-funk uses direct, choreographic staging of the body.

The main funky styles are:

- Popping
- Animation
- Strobing
- Floating (gliding)
- Dimestop
- Bopping
- Locking
- Waving
- Robot (botting)
- Saccing
- Slowmo
- Hitting (ticking)
- King tut
- Digits (finger waving) 3D
- Strutting
