= Tutting =

Tutting may refer to:

- A dental click interjection "tut-tut"
- Tutting, a locality in Kirchham, Germany
- Tutting (dance), a movement style in popping street dance
- Finger tutting, a related hand movement to tutting in body-popping dance
