= Boogaloo (disambiguation) =

Boogaloo refers to the genre of Latin music and dance which was popular in the United States in the 1960s.

Boogaloo may also refer to:

== Other dance styles ==
- Boogaloo (funk dance), a freestyle, improvisational street dance movement
- Electric boogaloo (dance), a related funk dance style

== Music ==
- Boogaloo (Nazareth album), 1998
- Boogaloo (John Patton album), recorded 1968 but released 1995
- "Boogaloo" (song), or "Fyra bugg och en Coca Cola", by Lotta Engberg, 1987
- "Boogaloo", a song by the Cat Empire from Cities, 2006
- "Boogaloo", a demo version of ABBA song Dancing Queen, 1975-1976

== People ==
- James "Boogaloo" Bolden (born 1950), American musician and band leader
- Boogaloo Joe Jones (born 1940), American jazz guitarist

== Other uses ==
- Boogaloo movement, a loosely organized far-right anti-government extremist movement in the United States
  - 2020 Oakland–Ben Lomond shootings, in California

== See also ==
- Electric Boogaloo (disambiguation)
- The Bugaloos, an American children's TV series
- Boogaloo and Graham, a 2014 British short drama film
- Breakin' 2: Electric Boogaloo, a 1984 American comedy-drama musical film
- Ray Lugo & The Boogaloo Destroyers, an American music group
- Boogaloo Joe, a 1969 album by Joe Jones
- The Electric Boogaloo Song, a 1969 album by Cedar Walton
- Gon' Boogaloo, a 2014 album by C. W. Stoneking
- Jala Jala y Boogaloo, a 1967 album by Richie Ray & Bobby Cruz
  - Jala Jala Boogaloo Volume II, 1968
- Sugar's Boogaloo, a 1999 album by The Sugarman 3
- "Back Off Boogaloo", a 1972 song by Ringo Starr
- Miles Brown (born 1984), known as Baby Boogaloo, American actor
