= Dramitse =

Town in Bhutan

Dramitse (Dremetse, Dremtse, Demtsi)
- Location in Bhutan
- Coordinates: 27°18′56″N 91°26′11″E
- Country: Bhutan
- District: Mongar District
- Village block: Drametse Gewog
- Elevation: 6,900 ft (2,100 m)
- Time zone: UTC+6 (BTT)

Dramitse (also Dametsi or Drametse) is a town in Drametse Gewog in the east part of Mongar District, Eastern Bhutan. At the 2005 census, its population was 541. It is situated on a hill opposite the town of Trashigang.

The town is the location of Dramitse Monastery, which is the home of the Drametse Ngacham or "Drum Dance" originated by Lama Kunga Gyaltsen, and the seat in Bhutan of Peling Sungtrul, who is revered as the speech incarnation of Pema Lingpa.

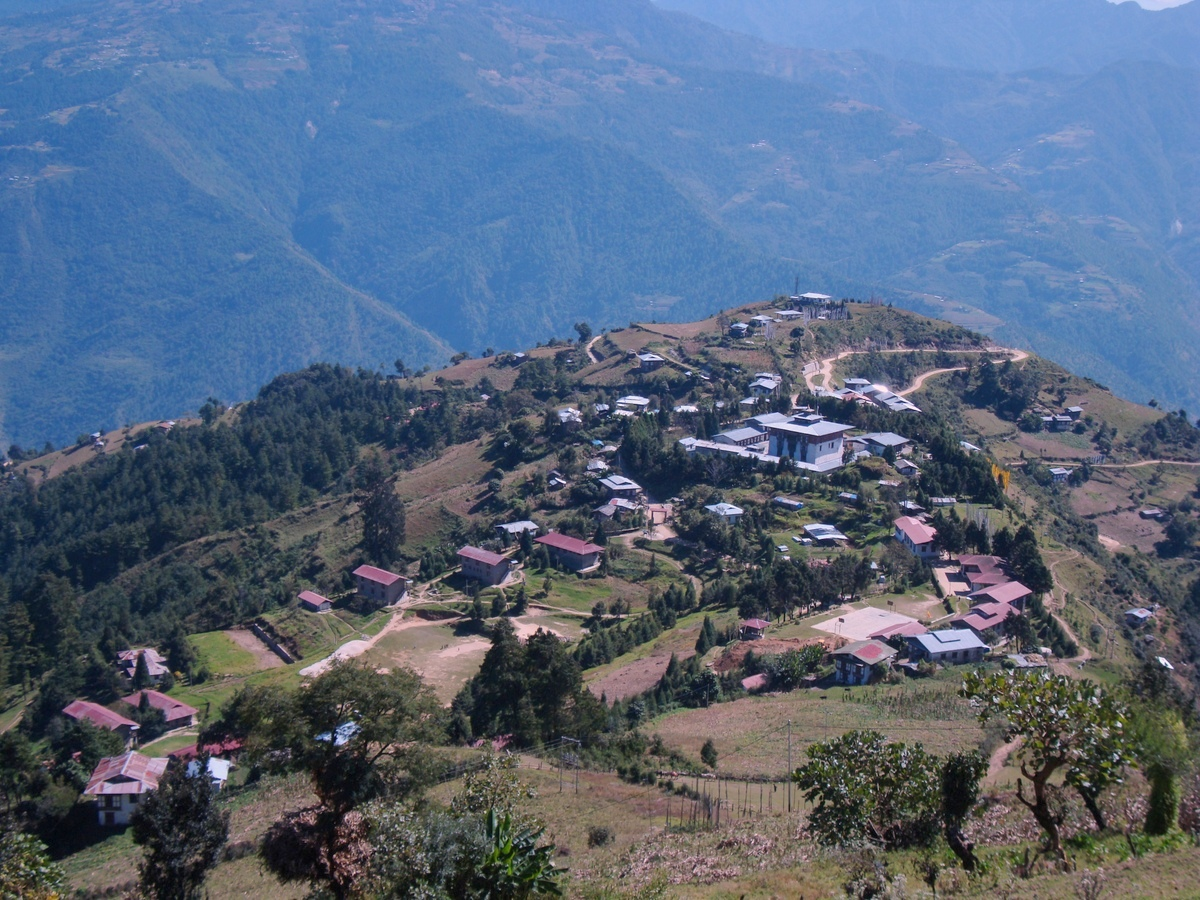
View of Drametse in Mongar district
