= The Carnival: Choreographer's Ball =

- Genre: R&B, hip hop, funk, modern, rock
- Dates: Monthly showcase
- Locations: Hollywood, New York, London, Sydney, Tokyo
- Years active: 2000–present
- Founders: Carey Ysais, Paulette Azizian
- Website: Official website

"The Carnival: Choreographer's Ball" show is the longest-running dance show in Southern California, United States, and a popular monthly showcase of the top/elite choreographers in the world (video, music, and film). The show is run in Hollywood, with satellite choreographer's balls in Chicago, New York, Sydney, London, and Tokyo.

The show is considered the dance community's ultimate competitive venue for choreographers to perform or display their work.

== Origin ==
The show was created by Los Angeles choreographers Carey Ysais and Paulette Azizian in 1998 to give working choreographers and dancers a venue where they could have free artistic expression without the constraints of an artist, a director, or a script. Ysais modeled the show after a similar choreographer showcase that had run at Prince's Glam Slam nightclub in Los Angeles in the 1990s. The first venue was the Key Club on the Sunset Strip, and was promoted in partnership with DMK Entertainment.

== Shows and performance types ==
In order to be on the show, choreographers have to submit video tapes of their work in advance and/or audition, with established and elite choreographers given free access.

Performances include street dance, popping, funk, hip hop, tap dancing, modern, ballet, lyrical dance, spoken word, and performance art. Each show has up to 14 choreographers and/or their dancers who are given up to "five minutes of freedom" to work artistically and perform before their peers.

Each performance (i.e., "piece") in the show is similar to a mini-musical, with an overall theme, props, costumes, and dance styles. Virtually any kind of dance music might be played or various music styles combined. However, many pieces are known for being edgy and provocative.

Some choreographers use the show for dance experimentation.

The first show of the year is usually an anniversary show, the latest "The Carnival: Choreographer's Ball 14th Anniversary Show," where the dance community celebrates the year in review. Choreographer awards and/or tributes are presented to their peers, or a person or group is recognized for outstanding achievement in the field of dance or choreography, including Lifetime Achievement Awards.

== Success ==
Talent agents for movie, music, and television productions regularly attend "The Carnival: Choreographer's Ball" shows searching for talent. Many dancers get industry work after performing at the show. It is estimated that up to "30 percent of participating dancers get bookings" as a result of being in a Choreographer Ball show.

The show often includes special guests and appearances by many of the top dancers and choreographers including Paula Abdul, Travis Payne, Kenny Ortega, and Wade Robson. The audience is usually populated with many of the top songwriters and musical acts in the entertainment business.

Regular hosts include:

- Lisa Joann Thompson (In Living Color, Fame L.A., and Motown Live)
- Affion Crockett (Def Comedy Jam, NYPD Blue, Dance Flick, and In the Flow with Affion Crockett)
- Carey Ysais, director/choreographer and co-founder of "The Carnival: Choreographer's Ball"

== Anniversary shows and achievement awards ==
The following gala award shows were celebrated by the dance community where awards and/or tributes were given to their peers for excellence or outstanding achievement in the field of choreography.

- Special Night Honoring the Work and Legacy of Alex Magno - July 27, 2023

On July 27, 2023, The Carnival: Choreographer’s Ball honored EMMY and WORLD CHOREOGRAPHY AWARDS nominated Alex Magno, renowned Director, Choreographer, and Dance Educator, with a Special Lifetime Achievement Award. The award was presented by Magno’s longtime student and muse, Dancing with the Stars judge Carrie Ann Inaba, who spoke on his significant contributions to the dance community and his influential role in shaping generations of dancers. In celebration, Magno choreographed a live performance for the event, showcasing his fusion of Latin Dance, Jazz, Hip-Hop, and other dance styles. In his acceptance speech, Magno expressed heartfelt gratitude to the many teachers, mentors, muses, and both current and former students who contributed to his artistic journey, including Brian Friedman, Carrie Ann Inaba, Christina Applegate, and others who have inspired and supported his legacy.

- 14th Anniversary Show – On January 30, 2013, The Carnival: Choreographer's Ball celebrated their 14th anniversary. At the show, Paula Abdul was honored with a Lifetime Achievement Award.
- 13th Anniversary Show – On January 25, 2012, The Carnival: Choreographer's Ball celebrated their 13th anniversary. At the show, The Electric Boogaloos were honored with a Lifetime Achievement Award for their role in popularizing dance styles such as popping, locking, and electric boogie. The award was presented to them by choreographer and dancer Toni Basil.
- 12th Anniversary Show – On January 26, 2011, The Carnival: Choreographer's Ball celebrated their 12th anniversary. At the show, Travis Payne was honored with a Lifetime Achievement Award to a star-studded audience including the dance judges from the television shows So You Think You Can Dance, MTV's America's Best Dance Crew, and many well-known choreographers such as Kenny Ortega, Derrick Hough, Chris Judd, Jon M. Chu, Harry Shum, Toni Basil.
- 11th Anniversary Show – On January 2, 2010, The Carnival: Choreographer's Ball celebrated their 11th anniversary. At the show, choreography agent Julie McDonald was honored for being a pioneer of dance representation and a friend, helper, and agent to many choreographers for over 25 years. The award was presented to her by Tony Selznick, Robin Antin, and one of her first clients, Paula Abdul.
- 10th Anniversary Show – On February 4, 2009, The Carnival: Choreographer's Ball celebrated their 10th anniversary. At the show, Debbie Allen was honored for her contributions to dance and was presented a Lifetime Achievement Award by Nia Peeples.
- 9th Anniversary Show – On January 30, 2008, The Carnival: Choreographer's Ball celebrated their 9th anniversary. At the show, director-choreographer Adam Shankman was given a tribute and honored with a Lifetime Achievement Award, presented by Kenny Ortega.
