= Popin' Pete =

American dancer and choreographer

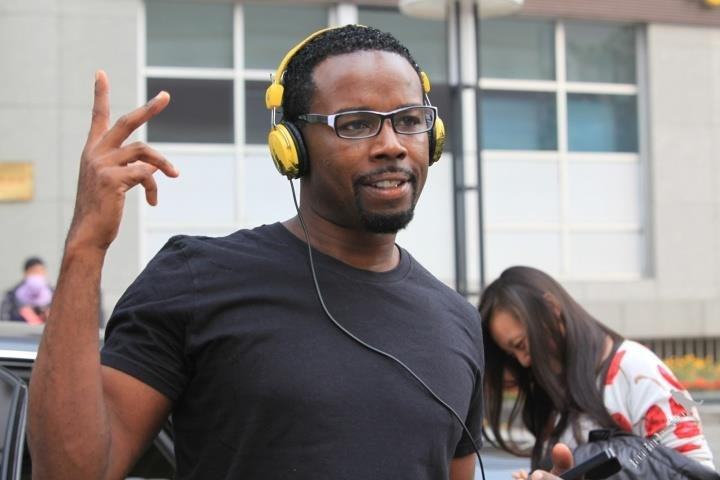
- Popin' Pete in China, 2011
- Born: Timothy Earl Solomon; August 5, 1961 (age 64); Fresno, California, U.S.
- Occupation(s): Dancer, choreographer

Timothy Earl Solomon (born August 5, 1961), known as Popin' Pete, is an American dancer and choreographer who popularized the "popping" dance style and member of the Electric Boogaloos. Pete’s career has spanned over forty years since the emergence of popping dance.

== Biography ==
Being inspired by his older brother, “Boogaloo” Sam Solomon, who by that time had already mastered all existing street dance styles, Pete would always watch Sam dance and learn from him . Around the years 1975-1976 Sam would combine the local popping techniques & Boogaloo styles that originated in Oakland. He compiled a set of basic movements and founded The Electric Boogaloos.

=== The Electric Boogaloos ===
Popin’ Pete is a first generation member of The Electric Boogaloos, joining the group in 1978, Pete began to learn the popping style. According to Pete, he learned to pop first because Boogaloo was too difficult. Boogaloo Sam as a creator of the group taught basics to the members of The Electric Boogaloos. As all the members were very experienced and passionate dancers, the group soon became successful. During that time, Pete and the other members of The Electric Boogaloos appeared on many popular shows including: The Midnight Special, Kicks and Soul Train in the United States. (firstly in 1980).

=== Relationship with Michael Jackson ===
In 1982, Michael Jackson, after seeing their Soul Train performance, approached members of The Electric Boogaloos to choreograph both the "Thriller" and "Beat It" videos. Their relationship with Jackson spanned almost two decades working in various roles — from numerous music videos (e.g. "Beat It", Captain EO & Michael Jackson's Ghosts) to multimedia movies, live performances, choreography, and lessons.

=== Popin' Pete in Chris Brown's "Yeah 3x" ===
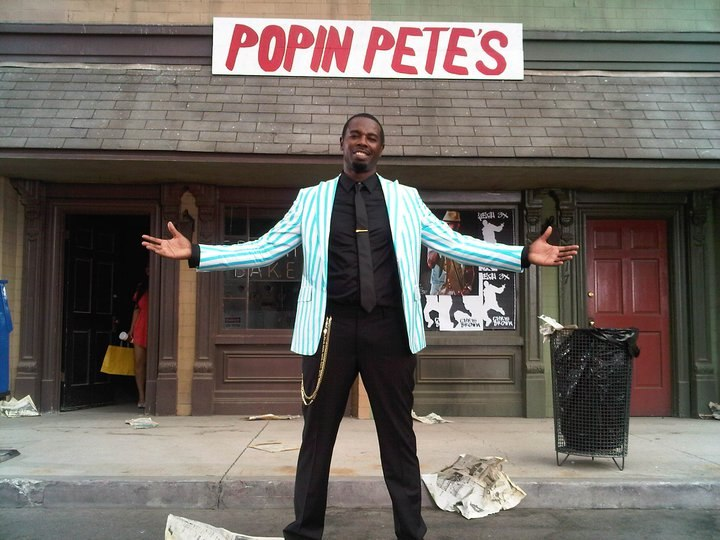
Popin Pete on the Chris Brown's Yeah 3x video, 2010

One scene in "Yeah 3x" is dedicated to Popin' Pete who dances with Chris Brown at a storefront labeled "Popin Pete's" . Pete and Brown do a dance routine which was choreographed by Pete. Then they each go on with short dance solos.

=== Popin’ Pete in funk culture ===
Popin Pete has gone on to innovate styles/moves like crazy legs, ET, spider man and sleepy style. With Electric Boogaloos he performs on the most authoritative scenes spreading American funkstyles culture all over the world, working alongside some of this generation's most dedicated and hard working music artists. Artists such as: Justin Timberlake, Gwen Stefani, Mýa, The Black Eyed Peas and Janet Jackson etc.
For 35 years Popin Pete and the Electric Boogaloos have been developing funk styles in the world. Popin Pete is invited as a judge to the dance competitions ("battles") in United Kingdom (UK Bboy Championship, Breakin' Convention), Europe, Japan (Dance Delight Japan, Old School Night), South Korea, China (Keep on dancing) etc. He is considered to be influential figure in street-dance culture. His students from the United States, Canada, UK, Europe, Brazil, Japan, China, South Korea, Russia call him "living legend". On January 25, 2012 the Electric Boogaloos were presented with special Life Time Achievement Award at The Carnival: Choreographer’s Ball 13 Year Anniversary Show.
