= Scott Garrett (disambiguation) =

Scott Garrett may refer to:

- Scott Garrett, New Jersey Congressman
- Scott Garrett (musician), former drummer for Pop's Cool Love, The Cult and Dag Nasty
- T. Scott Garrett, member of the Virginia House of Delegates
