= Salah (dancer) =

French hip-hop dancer

- Born: Salah Benlemqawanssa صلاح بن لمقوانصة; June 28, 1979 (age 47); Saint-Denis, France
- Other names: Salah the Entertainer; Spider Salah
- Occupation: Dancer
- Years active: 1995–present
- Known for: Winning La France a un incroyable talent, Arabs Got Talent and Tú Sí Que Vales (Italy)
- Website: BreatheTheBeat.com

Salah Benlemqawanssa (born June 28, 1979), also known as Salah the Entertainer and Spider Salah, is a competitive hip-hop dancer from France who won the inaugural season of La France a un incroyable talent (France has Incredible Talent), the fourth season of Arabs Got Talent and the fourth season of Tú Sí Que Vales (Italy). He was born in the Paris suburb Saint-Denis and is of Moroccan (Father) and Algerian (Mother) ancestry. He calls his personal dance style P.A.B.E. which stands for Popping, Animation, Boogaloo, and Effects. Although Salah is best known for popping, he is also skilled in b-boying.

== Career ==
Salah started dancing in 1996 after he saw the dance crew O Posse practicing their moves in front of the mirrors of the Théâtre national de Chaillot. Two years later, he and his crew The Family won second place at the international b-boying competition Battle of the Year (BOTY) in 1998. In 1999, he joined the contemporary dance company Montalvo-Hervieu.

In 2006, Salah won the first season of Incroyable Talent. In 2007, he performed a one-man stage show at London-based Breakin' Convention called "The Dream of Gluby". In 2008, he starred as himself in Beats Per Minute, an independent film about a French popper who discovers he can rewind time with his dance moves. In 2009, Salah served as a judge at BOTY's international one-on-one b-boy battle in Germany. BOTY is a b-boy competition exclusively for b-boy crews; however, to celebrate their 20th anniversary they had a competition for b-boy solo dancers.

"My life is dance and dance is my life. I sacrifice a lot for the dance. I am always practicing or performing. There is not much time for a personal life, but I love what I do! It takes a lot of inspiration, time and dedication to become a good dancer."

— Salah

In 2011, Salah led a digital project called Breathe the Beat. Through Breathe the Beat, he released a series of five video tutorials explaining how he takes inspiration from the world around him to create his P.A.B.E. dance style. He also judged an online competition based on the principles of his tutorials to see which dancer could create the best one-minute performance. The winner, chosen by Salah, that created the best routine was James "AnimatedJ" Jimenez from the USA. The project also featured a series of roadshows around the UK taught by Brooke and Roxy from Funkstylerz and Plague dance crews. After Breath the Beat, Salah toured North America from October 2011 to October 2012 as a featured dancer in Cirque du Soleil's production Michael Jackson: The Immortal World Tour.

In 2013, Salah became a brand ambassador for Puma. Through this partnership, Puma launched a dance project called "Puma the Quest" that gave five dancers the opportunity to travel the world and be personally mentored by Salah. The street dancers were chosen from hundreds of video submissions which were narrowed down to a core group of 20. The core group had to perform live in front of a panel of judges including singer Nawell Madani, rapper Youssoupha, and Salah himself. The five winners—Lara Laquiz, Tiet Sofian, Steph 2SL, Anto, and b-boy Ska—were announced the following day at the Juste Debout 2013 finals. They traveled with Salah to New York City, Berlin, Tokyo, Paris, London, and Los Angeles to learn about the street culture within each city. When they returned to Paris they created a show about their experience around the world.

In December 2013, Salah appeared on La France a un incroyable talent again in a one-time special called La Finale des Champions (The Finale of Champions). Three months later in March 2014, Salah served as a judge on the Canal J kids television show Battle Dance with singer Sherefa Luna and b-boy Ali "Lilou" Ramdani. In 2015, Salah won the fourth season of Arabs Got Talent.

== Titles ==
- Tú Sí Que Vales (Italy)
  - 2017: Winner
- Arabs Got Talent
  - 2015: Winner
- Last One Stands
  - 2014: 1-on-1 Popping champion
- DANCE@LIVE WORLDCUP
  - 2014: 1-on-1 Freestyle champion
  - 2018: 1-on-1 Freestyle champion
- Red Bull Beat It
  - 2012: 1-on-1 Freestyle champion
- UK B-Boy Championships
  - 2016: 1-on-1 Popping champion
  - 2010: B-boy crew champions (Note: He won the world b-boy crew battle with Vagabonds.)
  - 2007: 1-on-1 Popping champion
- Funkin' Styles
  - 2010: 1-on-1 Freestyle champion
  - 2009: 1-on-1 Freestyle champion
  - 2006: 1-on-1 Freestyle champion
- Popping Professional battle Japan
  - 2007: 1-on-1 Popping champion
- EuroBattle
  - 2008: 1-on-1 Popping champion
  - 2006: 1-on-1 Popping champion
- Juste Debout
  - 2006: 2-on-2 Popping champions - Salah & Iron Mike
  - 2004: 2-on-2 Popping champions - Salah & Damon Frost
- Incroyable Talent
  - 2006: Winner
- The Notorious IBE
  - 2005: Stand Up Dance Battle champion
  - 2003: Stand Up Dance Battle champion
  - 2002: Seven 2 Smoke champion
- Urban Momentum
  - 2004: 1-on-1 Freestyle champion
- B-Boy Showdown
  - 1998: 1-on-1 Popping champion
- FreeStylez Seesion Korea
  - 2004: 1-on-1 Freestyle champion

== Appearances ==
- Television
  - 2017: Tú Sí Que Vales
  - 2016: Das Supertalent
  - 2015: Arabs Got Talent
  - 2014: Battle Dance
  - 2013: La France a un Incroyable Talent
  - 2009: Star King
  - 2006: Incroyable Talent (Note: The official name of La France a un incroyable talent in the first season was Incroyable Talent.)
- Judging
  - 2013: All India Dance Competition
  - 2013: The Notorious IBE
  - 2013: R16
  - 2009: BOTY
  - 2009: Red Bull BC One
  - 2008: UK B-Boy Championships (Note: He judged the locking and popping competitions only.)
  - 2008: Warsaw Challenge
  - 2007: Warsaw Challenge
  - 2006: Circle Sensation
- Film
  - 2014: Mad About Dance
  - 2012: Houba! On the Trail of the Marsupilami (Sur la piste du Marsupilami)
  - 2008: Beats Per Minute
  - 2002: Asterix & Obelix: Mission Cleopatra (Astérix et Obélix: Mission Cléopâtre)
- Music Video
  - 1996: "Super Discount" - Etienne de Crecy
  - 2006: "Rudebox" - Robbie Williams
  - 2005: "Feel The Vibe" - Axwell
  - 2005: "Doo Wap" - Paul Johnson Feat. Chynna
- Stage
  - 2011: Michael Jackson: The Immortal World Tour
  - 2009: Breakin' Convention
  - 2008: Freestyle Session
  - 2008: Urban Dance Showcase
  - 2007: Rencontres de la Villette
  - 2007: Breakin' Convention
  - 2007: Red Bull BC One
  - 2001: France Moves
- Teaching
  - DanceKool
  - Street Dance Kemp Europe
  - Urban Dance Camp
  - Broadway Dance Center
  - Ones to Watch
  - International Dance Festival Birmingham
  - Giant Studio
  - The Hip Drop Dance Complex
  - Urban Dance Studio
  - Fair Play Academy

== Training ==
Salah specializes in hip-hop, but he has also studied other forms of dance including African, salsa, tap, contemporary, and belly dancing. Salah is a member of Vagabonds and Massive Monkees b-boy crews and Montalvo-Hervieu contemporary dance company. To stay in shape, he works out five times a week with two trainers.
