= Bone breaking =

Bone breaking may refer to:

- A bone fracture
- A type of street dance, also called flexing
