= Pop's Cool Love =

American rock band from Los Angeles

- Origin: Los Angeles, CA
- Genres: Jazz fusion; soul; funk metal
- Years active: 1990s
- Label: Elektra
- Past members: Suga Pop; Mike Tyler; Myles John O'Brien; Jerry Cohen; Tal Bergman

Pop's Cool Love was an American rock band from Los Angeles in the early 1990s, featuring multi-instrumentalist and street dancer Suga Pop, guitarist Mike Tyler, bassist Myles John O'Brien, keyboardist Jerry Cohen, and drummer Tal Bergman (later of Rock Candy Funk Party).

They released the album A Man on Elektra Records in 1991, followed by a self-titled album in 1992. Their video for "Free Me" was directed by Tim Pope.

Members of Pop's Cool Love were the backing band for LL Cool J, De La Soul, A Tribe Called Quest, and MC Lyte on a seminal 1991 episode of MTV Unplugged, of which The Chi reviewer Kenji Jasper noted, "Its impact was immeasurable." Producer Chris Shaw noted that the band had one day to prepare, and added pastiches from Lou Reed's "Walk on the Wild Side" and other songs to supplement the rappers' beats. The band later went on tour with A Tribe Called Quest.
