= Flexing (dance) =

Style of street dance

FlexN, also spelled as Flexing, is a style of street dance from Brooklyn, New York that is characterized by rhythmic Brukup/Dancehall, incorporating showmanship elements like pauzN, konnectN, GlidN, Getlow, Bonebreaking and hat tricks.

== Origins ==
Before FlexN gained mainstream exposure, it started out at the home of a couple called Rocky and Sandra Cummings. In 1992, the couple created a talent show and a local cable TV show in New York City, called 'Flex N Brooklyn'. The dance roots are traced back to reggae, dancehall, and "...a chopped-up instrumental called the 'Volume' riddim". The producers of the new genre refer to it as FDM, Flex Dance Music. Unlike other street dance styles originating in the United States, FlexN did not come from hip-hop dance, funk music, or hip-hop culture. It evolved from a Jamaican style of street dance called bruk-up. In a 2009 interview with WireTap magazine, dancer Stefan "Mr. Wiggles" Clemente described bruk-up as a "reggae style of animation."

== Variations ==
FlexN is represented by 8 movement styles, with flexers often mixing the styles.

- Bone-breaking is characterized by rhythmic contortionist movement.
- Bruk Up, “broken” in Jamaican Patois, is a style that resembles movement of broken limbs.
- Connecting (K'nect'N), is often compared to tutting, but is of different origins than popping.
- Get Lo integrates movements on the floor and the levels in between.
- Grooving is the foundation of the flow of FlexN with roots in Jamaican dancehall, characterized by rhythmic movements that can be subtle or aggressive.
- Gliding is a style of illusion of air walking, sliding, and floating, using hand placements, body movement, and foot placement.
- Hat Tricks is a style that utilizes the hat for illusions, concepts, and animations.
- Pausing (Pauzn) is characterized by discrete movement similar to a movie watched frame by frame.

== Exposure ==
FlexN has been performed on the third season of America's Best Dance Crew (ABDC), on the second season of The LXD, and at the Guggenheim Museum as part of the YouTube Play event. In 2011, the Huffington Post published a brief news article on flex dancers Bones the Machine and DJ Aaron. In 2013, NextLevelSquad performed FlexN at Breakin' Convention and Adedamola "Ringmaster Nugget" Orisagbemi performed FlexN at the Vail International Dance Festival.

The 2013 independent film Flex Is Kings documents the lives of several flexers over a two-year period leading up to a dance competition called BattleFest. Flex Is Kings was screened at the Tribeca Film Festival. FlexN was also the subject of a French online dance show called "Puma the Quest". In 2014, The New Yorker published a seven-page article about flex dancer Saalim "Storyboard P" Muslim.

== Notable FDM Producers ==
- DJ Aaron
- Epic B
- Hitmakerchinx
- Uninamise
