= Carey Ysais =

American dancer and choreographer

Carey Ysais is an American dancer and choreographer. He is best known as the co-founder, director, and executive producer of a popular monthly show called The Carnival: Choreographer's Ball, which is also the longest running dance show in Los Angeles California.

Ysais starting dancing as a teenager and was heavily influenced by Don Campbell, who invented the locking dance in the 1970s.

In 1998, Ysais and choreographer Paulette Azizian created a show to give dancers and choreographers an outlet for free artistic expression without the constraints of commercial profit, or the demands of a director or a script, called The Carnival: Choreographer's Ball. The show quickly caught on with the dance community and began to boost the careers of dancers and choreographers. The show has a history of being sold out. For some shows, Ysais is a co-host in addition to being the producer and director.

On December 6, 2010, Carey Ysais received a Lifetime Achievement Award at the 2010 TIV Awards.
