= Storyboard P =

American street dancer

- Born: 1990 or 1991 (age 35–36)
- Occupation: Street dancer
- Awards: Bessie Award for Outstanding Emerging Choreographer

Storyboard P (born Saalim Muslim) is an American street dancer. He is one of the foremost practitioners of the flex genre of street dance, and is particularly noted for his improvisational style. He developed a type of dance called "mutation" or "mutant", which uses fractured movements in an homage to stop motion animation, which the name "Storyboard P" also alludes to.

== Early life ==
Storyboard P was born Saalim Muslim, and grew up in Crown Heights, Brooklyn. He danced under the name Professoar, but later switched to the name Storyboard P, with "Storyboard" referring to stop motion animation, and the "P" retained from Professoar. He studied dance at the Harlem School of the Arts.

== Style ==
Storyboard P is particularly known for flex, a style of street dance that originated in Brooklyn and involves pantomime and physical contortion. He also developed his own genre of street dance, called "mutation" or "mutant". This style draws from animation, particularly stop motion and claymation, and involves tightly controlled and fractured movements, and simulations of seemingly impossible motion like levitation or moving backwards while walking forwards. Storyboard P is particularly noted for his dance improvisation.

== Performances ==
Storyboard P has performed at venues including the Breakin' Convention at Sadler's Wells Theatre, the Massachusetts Museum of Contemporary Art, and Ithaca College, and he was commissioned to appear at Performance Space New York.

In addition to street dance, Storyboard P has performed in prominent music videos. In 2010, he danced in the video for "Close Your Eyes" by The Bullitts. In 2012, Storyboard P was featured in the film for Until the Quiet Comes by Flying Lotus, which won the Special Jury Award for Short Film at the Sundance Film Festival, and was identified by Okayplayer as the moment when Storyboard P "hit the mainstream". He was then selected to dance solo in the 2013 video for "Picasso Baby" by Jay-Z, and he did not listen to the track beforehand, instead choosing to improvise his dance performance as he heard the track for the first time. In 2017, Storyboard P was featured in the music video for the song "4:44" by Jay-Z. By 2017, YouTube videos that included Storyboard P's dancing had reached about 500 million views, due to his appearances on videos by prominent musical artists. Storyboard P also performed in a commercial for the Apple Watch. As of 2026, he has appeared in Drake's HIGH FIVE & Little Birdie music videos, which were a part of his successful Iceman episode 4, on May 14, 2026, on Drake's YouTube Channel.

== Recognition ==
At the Bessie Awards in 2015, Storyboard P won the Outstanding Emerging Choreographer Award. His dancing has been featured in The New York Times and The New Yorker, and was profiled in a cover feature for The Wire. He was also the subject of a study by the liquid blackness project.

An article by The Guardian noted that Storyboard P is "widely regarded as the world's greatest exponent of flex", while in Okayplayer he was identified as "the king of flex dancing". He has been compared to the neo-expressionist visual artist Jean-Michel Basquiat, and in The New Yorker Storyboard P was identified as "the Basquiat of street dance". The resemblance of some motions in mutation dance to the moonwalk have also invited comparisons to Michael Jackson, including as "more virtuosic extension of Michael Jackson".
