= The Electric Boogaloos =

American street dance group

The Electric Boogaloos are a street dance crew responsible for the spread of popping and electric boogaloo. The name "Boogaloo" came from a song called "Do a Boogaloo" by James Brown, which was also adapted as a Boogaloo street dance done from Oakland, CA. They were founded by Boogaloo Sam in Fresno, California in 1977. Their original name was the Electronic Boogaloo Lockers but "Lockers" was dropped the following year.

On January 25, 2012, The Electric Boogaloos were honored with a Lifetime Achievement Award at the 13th anniversary show of The Carnival: Choreographer's Ball, for their role in popularizing dance styles such as popping and electric boogaloo, presented by choreographer and dancer Toni Basil.

== Members ==
Boogaloo Sam, also known as Sam Solomon grew up in Fresno, California. Sam was also inspired by The Lockers, who he saw on television. He created a new dance style after learning from the Bay City Boogaloos and meeting Tick'n Will and Darnell McDowell - the Ace Tre Lockers - they danced a form of Boogaloo from Oakland. He innovated popping and the EB Boogaloo dance style from Fresno. Popin’ Pete, Boogaloo Sam's little brother, practiced his dance moves by watching Soul Train and doing the robot. Poppin' Pete was taught how to pop styles by his older brother Boogaloo Sam. He watched his brother pop styles and wanted to learn too. The original members of the first group from long beach California were: Boogaloo Sam, Popin Pete, Robot Dane, Puppet Boozer, Creeping Sidney and Scarecrow Scalley. "Skeeter Rabbit of the EBs"who took his dance name from an early original Locker and Robot dancer James @ "Skeeter Rabbit" Higgins, Stephan grew up in Los Angeles, and originally was followed in his name sakes tradition as a locker until his cousins, Boogaloo Sam and Popin’ Pete introduced him to popping. Suga Pop was determined to become part of the Electric Boogaloos after he saw them perform on Soul Train. Later, he moved to Los Angeles where he met Popin’ Pete and Skeeter Rabbit and joined the Electric Boogaloos in 1979. He is currently a music producer. Mr. Wiggles is the most recent addition to the Electric Boogaloos, growing up from South Bronx, New York he is also a member of the Rock Steady Crew.
