= Julie McDonald (agent) =

- Born: 1954 (age 71–72)
- Occupation: Talent agent
- Years active: 1985 - Present
- Employer(s): McDonald Selznick Associates (owner & co-founder)
- Known for: Being the first dance agent

Julie McDonald (born 1954) is a talent agent and co-founder of McDonald Selznick Associates (MSA), an agency headquartered in Hollywood, California, that represents dancers, choreographers, stage directors, and production designers. She is best known for being the first dance agent i.e. the first talent agent to offer commercial representation for dancers.

== Career ==
In the 1980s, McDonald worked as a ballet and modern dancer and owned a dance studio in Venice, California, called Room to Move. Due to a knee injury while shooting a television commercial, she was forced to end her dance career early, but she still had a desire to work in entertainment. In 1985, after taking a three-week entertainment business course, she took a position as an agent at Joseph, Heldfond & Rix (JHR) agency. At the time, JHR only represented actors. McDonald became the first dance agent by creating the first agency department dedicated exclusively to dancer representation. At the time, representation for back-up dancers did not exist and they were commonly classified as "extras". At the first agency audition she held, 300 dancers showed up; one of her first clients was Paula Abdul.

While at JHR, McDonald worked to improve working conditions for dancers and secure overtime and hazard pay. In 1990, she founded the Dancers' Alliance to establish minimum rates for work. In 2000, she left JHR (which is now called Kazarian/Spencer Associates) and founded McDonald Selznick Associates with business partner Tony Selznick. She took her entire client roster of choreographers with her including Darrin Henson, Nadine "Hi Hat" Ruffin, Kenny Ortega, Marguerite Derricks, Travis Payne, Jerry Mitchell, and Wade Robson.

In addition to running MSA, McDonald is on the advisory council of Dance Camera West film festival. In 2011, she was an associate producer for the dance documentary MOVE. In 2012, she produced the Emmy's live webcast and panel discussion "The Choreographers...Yesterday Today and Tomorrow".

== Awards ==
In 2010, McDonald was honored at The Carnival: Choreographer’s Ball "for being a pioneer of dance representation." Her award was presented to her by Paula Abdul, Tony Selznick, and Robin Antin.

In 2011, she won a Lifetime Achievement Award at the 14th Annual Dance Under the Stars Choreography Festival. In 2013, she was an honoree at Tremaine Dance Convention's National Gala and she won another Lifetime Achievement Award, from The Industry Voice, for her work with Dancers' Alliance.

In 2014, World of Dance presented her and her business partner Tony Selznick with the Decade of Dance award.
