= Drametse Gewog =

Drametse Gewog དགྲ་མེད་རྩེ་
- Gewog
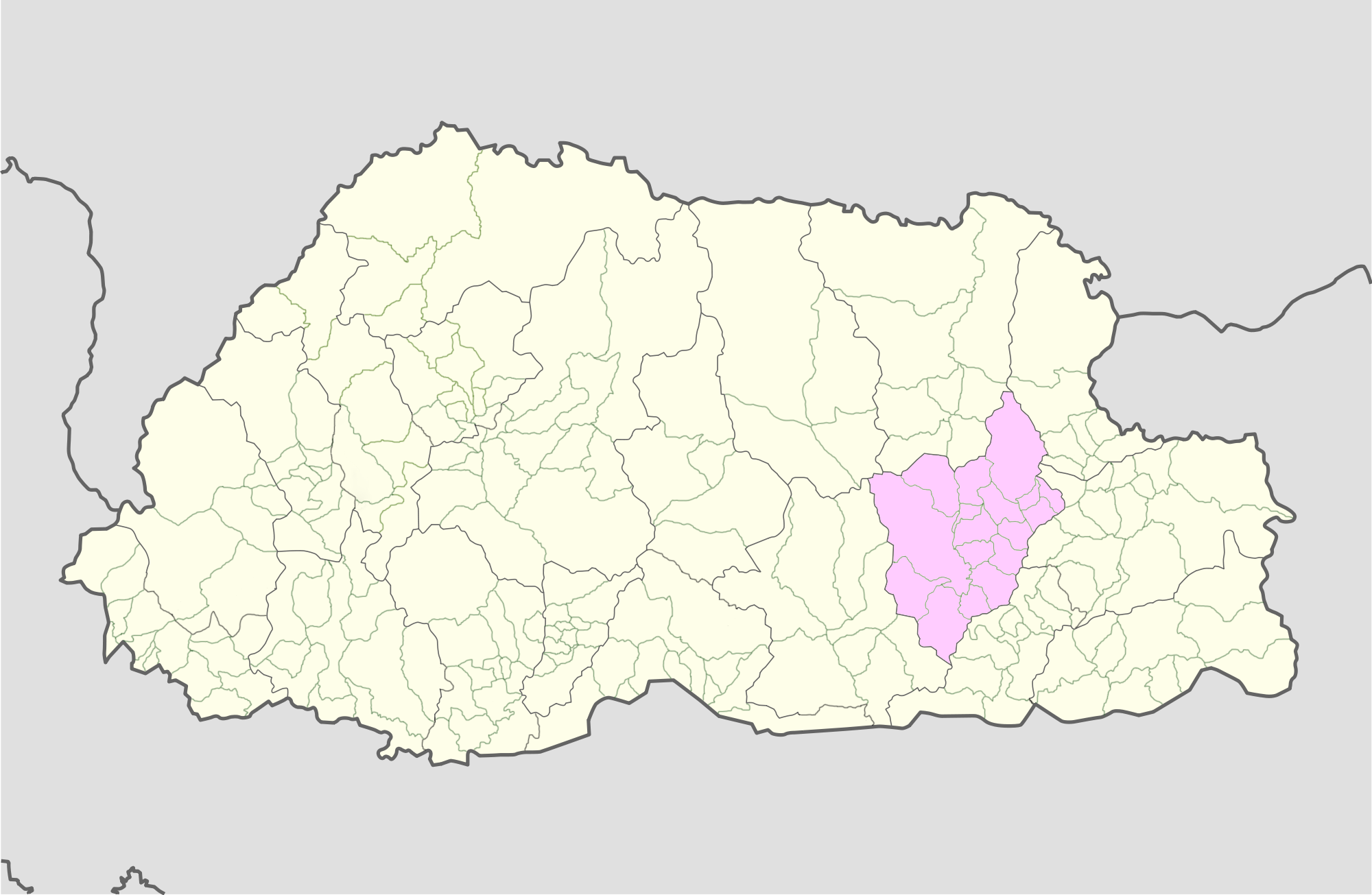
- Country: Bhutan
- District: Mongar District
- Time zone: UTC+6 (BTT)

Drametse Gewog (Dzongkha: དགྲ་མེད་རྩེ་) is a gewog (village block) of Mongar District, Bhutan.
