= Drametse Ngacham =

Bhutanese religious dance

The Drametse Ngacham (meaning "mask dance of the drums from Drametse", nga means "drum" and cham means "mask dance") is a sacred dance performed in the village of Drametse in eastern Bhutan. It is performed twice a year during the Drametse festival, which occurs on the fifth and tenth months of the Bhutanese calendar. The festival is organized by the Ogyen Tegchok Namdroel Choeling Monastery to honor Padmasambhava, an 8th-century Buddhist master.

A performance of the dance features sixteen masked male dancers and ten musicians. The dancers wear monastic robes and wooden masks with features of animals, both real and mythical. The musicians play "cymbals, trumpets and drums, including the bang nga, a large cylindrical drum, the lag nga, a small hand-held circular flat drum, and the nga chen, a drum beaten with a bent drumstick." They first perform a prayer dance in the soeldep cham, the main shrine, before appearing one by one in the courtyard of the monastery. The dance has two parts: a calm, contemplative part to represent the peaceful deities, and a rapid, athletic part for the wrathful ones.

Performances of the dance have been conducted for almost five centuries. In the late nineteenth century, the dance started spreading to other parts of Bhutan. Today, it is approaching to be something of a national dance for the country, representing the identity of the Bhutanese nation.

The dance was inscribed in the Representative List of the Intangible Cultural Heritage of Humanity by UNESCO in 2008, though it was originally proclaimed in 2005. The original proclamation notes "the number of practitioners is dwindling due to the lack of rehearsal time, the absence of a systematic mechanism to train and honour the dancers and musicians and the gradual decrease in interest among young people."

The Institute of Language and Culture Studies at the Royal University of Bhutan coordinated and implemented a project to preserve and promote the dance. The project was funded by the Japanese Funds-in-Trust for the Safeguarding of Intangible Cultural Heritage, through UNESCO. It involved strengthening the training capacities of the monastery, compiling existing documentation, recording videos of the dance, researching its history, and promotional activities. A result of the project was a book about the dance written in English and Dzongkha and an accompanying film.
