= Suga Pop =

American dancer

Steve da Silva', better known as Suga Pop, is an American "street dance" practitioner and choreographer based in the United States. He is known for his work in "popping" and "locking", styles of dance collectively grouped under the umbrella term "funk styles". These styles are associated with the U.S. West Coast, particularly California. He has been affiliated with the performance groups Electric Boogaloos and Rock Steady Crew.

== History ==
Suga Pop worked with artists such as Michael Jackson, James Brown, Lionel Richie, Janet Jackson, and Sheila E in the 1980s and 1990s, touring as a dancer, featuring in televised performances such as Herbie Hancock's performance of "Rockit" at the 1984 Grammy Awards, and appearing in such seminal pop musical videos as Michael Jackson's "Beat It" and "Thriller," and Janet Jackson's "That's The Way Love Goes." After touring as a dancer with Lionel Richie, and then with Sheila E in support of Prince's Purple Rain Tour of 1984–1985, Suga Pop ventured into music collaboration and production. He has subsequently played live with such acts as A Tribe Called Quest, De La Soul, Amp Fiddler, Cypress Hill, Brand Nubian, LL Cool J, Third Bass, and the Boo-Yaa T.R.I.B.E., in addition to recording and releasing his own material under the band name Pop's Cool Love, and mostly recently, under the name Pop. A video for the single "My Suga" was loaded to YouTube in 2011, and the single is available on iTunes.

== Legacy ==
Suga Pop is recognized as a key contributor to the international street dancing scene, regularly teaching and delivering workshops on the dance forms of locking and popping around the world. He is recognized by other dance practitioners as playing a key role in teaching these West Coast forms to dancers in New York in the early 1980s, and in subsequently teaching the New York street dance form b-boying or breaking in Los Angeles, after returning from the East Coast.
