= Country Swing (dance) =

Country Swing is a country style partner dance danced mostly, but not exclusively, to the Western swing music.

The movements of this dance originate from swing dancing. The footwork is simpler compared to mainstream swing dances: quick, quick, slow. The simplicity of the steps is compensated by the extensive use of various movements with the partner lifting into the air (known in swing dancing as Aerials, but in country dancing, including country swing, these movements are called Lifts).

While Country Swing shares some similarity with the two-step dance, it is distinct. Country swing is a stationary, rotational partner dance, while two-step is a traditional traveling partner dance that moves counterclockwise around the dance floor in a circle.

It is danced in a small space, often in crowded spaces, such as bars, and relies on improvisation more than fixed patterns.

== Sources ==
- C. Bluehill, The Viral Phenomenon of Country Swing and Line Dancing
