= Finger-tutting =

Type of dance

- Genre: Street dance
- Year: 1990s
- Origin: United States

Finger-tutting is a type of dance that involves intricate movements of the fingers. "Tutting" is a street dance style based on angular movements which are supposed to stylize the poses seen on reliefs in the art of ancient Egypt, and refers to "King Tut".

Popularity of this dance style increased after Jay Gutierrez or "Jsmooth" revealed his innovated style of finger-tutting in the credits of Step Up 3D, released August 6, 2010.

Finger-tutting received international attention after dancer/choreographer Julian "JayFunk" Daniels performed in a viral Samsung commercial entitled "Unleash Your Fingers". Later, the dance group Finger Circus popularized the form through commercials and YouTube videos.

Finger-tutting received further international attention after practitioner John Hunt, also known as Pnut, made a viral video entitled "Greasy Fingers". Filmed, directed and produced by Statussilver. Later, Hunt was featured prominently in the video for the Taylor Swift song "Shake It Off".

More recently, finger-tutting has been featured in the Syfy show The Magicians and the Marvel Studios film Doctor Strange as one of the ways in which characters can cast various spells. JayFunk helped with the finger-tutting in Doctor Strange.

In 2020, the music video for "Naughty" by Red Velvet's Irene and Seulgi featured a choreographed tutting performance.

== See also ==
- Gloving
