= Mr. Wiggles =

American street dancer

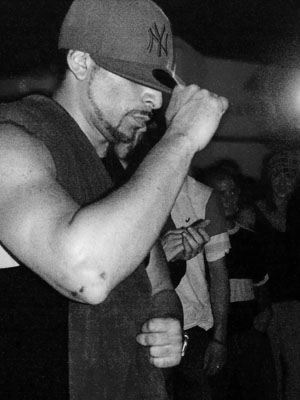
Mr. Wiggles performing in 2005

Steffan "Mr. Wiggles" Clemente (born 1965) is an American street dancer, noted for his popping skills. He has been active as a dancer, actor, choreographer, dance instructor, music producer and graffiti artist. He is a member of the Rock Steady Crew, The Electric Boogaloos, Tribal Click, Zulu Nation, and TC5 (also known as The Cool Five or The Crazy Five).

== Biography ==
Steffan "Mr. Wiggles" Clemente was born in 1965 in the South Bronx area of New York City, of Puerto Rican descent. He was raised on hip hop since the early 1970s. His dancing career started by battling all around New York City. He built his battling reputation until he was able to battle around the world. This includes Europe, South America, Asia, the Middle East, Canada, and on the stages of Broadway. He has been credited for two feature films – the 1984 drama dance film Beat Street and the 1983 hip-hop film Wild Style – which helped establish hip hop today.

During his time in the graffiti crew TC5, Clemente was known as "Rek" by other members of the group. Clemente originally got his stage name of Mr. Wiggles from a leader in the TC5 crew, who went by both "Seen" and "Mr. Wiggles". While cutting class in school, Clemente had shown "Seen" a certain dance move which inspired him to give Clemente his side-alias, "Mr. Wiggles".

Aside from dancing, he has worked in theater, film, and music with entertainers, including Graciela Daniele, Bill Irwin, and Ann Marie DeAngelo. He has been a featured artist at the Apollo Theater (New York City) and performed at the John F. Kennedy Center for the Performing Arts (Washington, D.C.). He has appeared in music videos with musicians, including Missy Elliott, Usher, Madonna, and Limp Bizkit, among others.

He, along with the members of Rock Steady Crew, were acclaimed at the first annual VH-1 Hip Hop Honors in 2004.

== Awards ==
- 1993 Foundation for Contemporary Arts Grants to Artists Award
- Drama Desk Award nomination for the Ghettoriginal production of Jam on the Groove
- Bessie Award for Best Choreography for the theatrical production of So What Happens Now, a play dedicated to Buck4, a deceased Rock Steady crew member

== Personal life ==
Clemente and his wife, Zoraya, have six children.

== See also ==
- Breakdancing
- Locking
