= Turfing =

Type of street dance

Turfing (or turf dancing) is a form of street dance that originated in Oakland, California, United States, characterized by rhythmic movement combined with waving, floor moves, gliding, flexing, and contortioning. It was developed by youth from West Oakland and organized by dancer Jeriel Bey, who coined the name "turf dancing," or "Turfin" and named his Organization The Architeckz™. Bey named the dance form as an acronym for "Taking Up Room on the Floor." The style was originally known by the terms "having fun with it" or "hitting it", but these names didn't seem marketable. However, another claim for the nomenclature considers the acronym as a backronym and that turf dancing originated as a way to describe dances that different "turfs" (locations or territories) from Oakland performed to represent where they were from (the same as "blocks" or "sets"). The dance form had its earliest influences in the Boogaloo movement of the mid-1960s, but it developed into a distinctive dance style.

== History ==
The dance form can be traced back to the traditions of the Boogaloo movement in Oakland, California in the 1960s, developing into a separate genre of dance in the 1990s. Along with hyphy music, it came to be seen as distinctively representative of Oakland. The movement rose to prominence in 2002 following Jeriel Bey's establishment of his group, "The Architeckz™."

Turfing is a social critique and recognition of lost African American lives, police brutality, and race relations in Oakland. This form of expression uniquely addresses African American deaths, while using art to create a politicized awareness of brutality against people of color. It is also seen as a means to humanize blackness, spread community, empathy, and peace in the same streets black lives were taken. Apart from being a unique hood dance form, turfing represents a collective movement, and is part of the street culture in the East Bay.

Turf dancing was first displayed on videos from artists such as Baby Bash, Keak Da Sneak, and E-40 by innovative and influential turf dancers (and creators of the turfing Lifestyle). Turf dance had been promoted as a means of dispute resolution within the Oakland community, and in 2005 The Architeckz built on this concept of dance battle by engaging krump dancers from Los Angeles in city-level competition. Friendly rivalries with dancers from New York City and Memphis, Tennessee, have developed as well. The artist E-40 brought international attention to the movement with his 2006 single "Tell Me When to Go". In 2012 Alonzo (Turf) Jones a.k.a. Retro, a turf dancer and skateboarder from California's Bay Area competed on the TV talent competition America's Got Talent in season 7.

== Foundation ==
The foundation of turf dance is based on a series of dances with different "turfs" in Oakland displayed. Some of these foundation dances are "two step," "brookfield," "auntie," "shaking," "the busta," "cliffhangers," "tsunamis" and "traces". Turf dance also includes "story telling" which is a style based on pantomime "life stories" or "everyday activities". Turfing incorporates other dance style concepts such as tutting, flexing, waving and animation. Turf dance is an improvisational, free-flowing form of dance that is based on the idea of pure cause and effect but focuses on storytelling, the creation of optical illusions, and the display of distinctive personal style. Dance elements include Boogaloo, popping, locking, and miming. Gliding is heavily used in turf dance because it enables the creation of optical illusions. "Going dumb," or completely letting one's emotions loose on the dance floor, is also a distinctive part of the tradition.
