= Liquid and digits =

Type of urban street dance

Liquid and digits is a type of gestural, interpretive, rave and urban street dance that sometimes involve aspects of pantomime. The term invokes the word liquid to describe the fluid-like motion of the dancer's body and appendages and digits to refer to illusions constructed with the dancer's fingers. Liquid dancing has many moves in common with popping and waving. ("Waving" is a style of dance where the dancer tries to make it appear that waves are rolling through their body.) The exact origins of the dances are uncertain, although they came out of either popping, raves, or both sometime from the 1970s to 1990s. The dance is typically done to a variety of electronic dance music genres from trance to drum and bass to glitch hop, depending on the dancer's musical taste.
