= Electric boogaloo (dance) =

Dance style closely related to popping and Boogaloo street dance

Electric boogaloo (sometimes referred to as electric boogie on the East Coast of the United States) is a dance style closely related to the earlier Boogaloo street dance performed in Oakland and popping. It combines modern popping techniques and earlier boogaloo forms. It became the signature style of the mid-1970s dance group, the Electric Boogaloos and also performed by the bush. Along with electric boogaloo, they also popularized popping and many of its related styles.

It is characterized as a fluid leg-oriented style danced to funk music, utilizing rolls of the hips, knees, legs, and head, which was later combined with popping.

== Dance steps ==
- Creepin - A foundational step of Boogaloo done in Oakland inspired by cartoon's Goofy, typically done as an entry and exit step with arms out, legs extended. Sometimes the Creep can be combined with a physical pointing hand gesture to challenge an opponent.
- Crazy legs - A footwalk that was created by Poppin Pete. He invented "Crazy Legs" by watching a boy called Crazy Legs dancing and changed what he saw into a popping move.
- The Slot (ex. Fresno) - This foundation originates in Oakland's Boogaloo generation, created by John Murphy. It is a basic movement between body, arm, and foot. Previously referred to earlier Boogaloo dancers in Oakland as "The Slot", it was a side to side movement ending in a hard pose or a "hit" to help keep dancers in rhythm or "put him in the slot", to imitate a pinball slot machine. The Slot can be performed in various ways as only the following requirements exist. In a fresno or the slot, the dancer moves side-to-side doing a hit on each turn with the leg and arm of the side the dancer has moved to; it can be done backward and forwards.
- Neck-o-flex - The neck twix between the body and the neck.
- Old man - A type of boogaloo style was created by Boogaloo Sam. Boogaloo Sam invented this move by watching an old man walking across the street.
- Twist-o-flex - A technique where, as in the mannequin, the dancer creates the impression of unnatural body joints by moving and twisting various parts in sequence. Non-twisting parts should remain absolutely still. The effect resembles a Rubik's Cube moving, or somewhat a clay figure being modeled. It can be further refined by using hands to "push" or "pull" the body parts around.
- Walk-out - A footwalk that took you from point A to point B.

== See also ==
- Boogaloo, a genre of Latin music and dance which was popular in the United States in the 1960s
- Boogaloo (funk dance)
- Breakin' 2: Electric Boogaloo
