= Robot (dance) =

Illusionary street dance style that attempts to imitate a dancing robot or mannequin

The robot, also called mannequin or dancing machine, is a street dance style—often confused with popping—that suggests the stilted movements of a dancing robot or mannequin. Roboting gained fame in the 1970s after Michael Jackson used the dance when he performed "Dancing Machine" with his brothers.

== Description ==
The robot became popular in the 1980s, but goes back to the 1970s, when it was used theatrically in miming. It is a dance in which the dancer moves their limbs in a way that imitates the movements of a robot. Movements of the robot are normally started and finished with a dimestop (a very abrupt stop), to give the impression of motors starting and stopping, but poppers have also been known to do the robot with a pop to the beat. As long as the illusion of being a robot is maintained, it is considered the robot.

Robot dancing is often considered a subsection of popping because poppers often include the robot in their routines, sometimes adding pops to the beat while maintaining the illusion of a robot. However, the robot also exists as its own dance and is sometimes considered a performance rather than a dance when the performer is imitating a robot without any music. When done without music, it is considered to be mime, instead of dance. Street theater often featured mimes who did a mechanical man or puppet style illusion, without music, including performer Robert Shields, who would later perform this style on a wider stage as part of Shields and Yarnell. In the late 1960s, the style was used while social dancing to funk or soul music. While not the first to imitate a robot as a mime, Charles "Robot" Washington and his partner "Robot Ann" were the first to socially couple dance the style to music at parties and clubs. It was at this point it became a party dance and later combined with other illusion styles to form today's popping style. It is commonly known as "Robotics". Roboting has also been likened to the jazz-era folk dance of puppeting (a style also appreciated in some colors of experimental ballet), whereby the dancer would emulate the mechanical movements of a simple musical box doll.

Two girls doing the robot dance in Japan, 2016

== Music ==
As with popping in general, the visual impact of the robot can be boosted by doing it in pace with music. The best effect is achieved with music that has very distinct beats such as electrofunk. It is nonetheless common to use music not particularly suited for the dance, but which has a "robot theme". In 1969 Jack Wild did the robot in the "Mechanical Boy" episode of H.R. Pufnstuf. The Jackson 5 first performed "Dancing Machine" on Soul Train on November 3, 1973, where Michael Jackson performed a robot dance during the song's musical break. The group again performed the routine on The Mike Douglas Show and the Sonny and Cher Comedy Hour in 1974.

== World record ==
On September 29, 2009, the Guinness World Record for the Largest Robot Dance was broken by Robogals at the University of Melbourne, Australia. The previous record of 276 was broken when a Guinness World Record recognised 318 people were recorded as dancing in unison in approved robot style.
