= Popping =

Street dance style

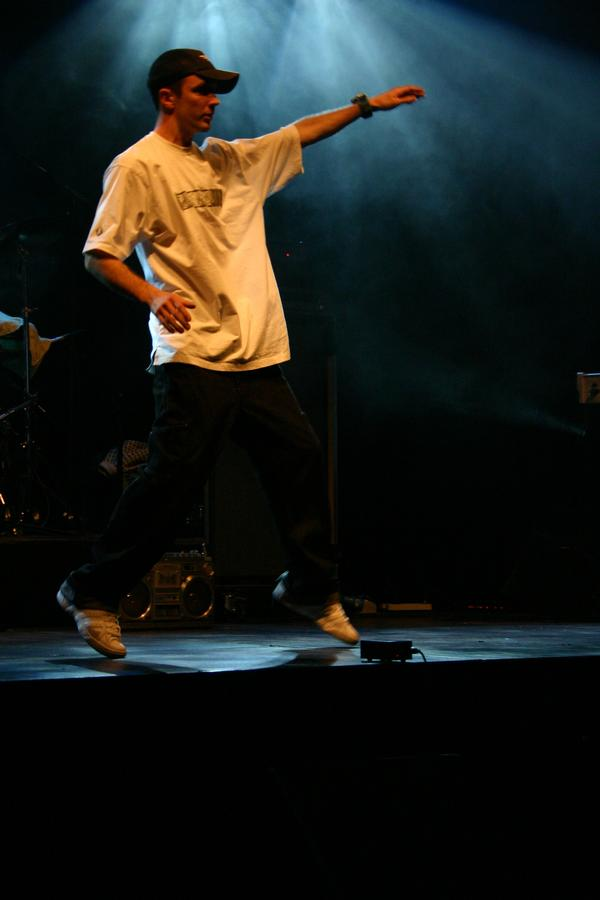
- A choreographed popping performance
- Genre: Street dance
- Year: Late 1970s

Popping is a street dance adapted out of the earlier boogaloo cultural movement in Oakland, California. As boogaloo spread, it would be referred to as "robottin'" in Richmond, California; Strutting movements in San Francisco and San Jose; and the Strikin' dances of the Oak Park community in Sacramento, and "Pop-Locking" of Los Angeles which were popular through the mid-1960s to the late 1970s.

Popping would be eventually adapted from earlier boogaloo (freestyle dance) movements from Oakland, California to Fresno, California, in the late 1970s by way of California high school gatherings at the West Coast Relays track meets. The dance is rooted in the rhythms of live funk music, and is based on the technique of boogaloo's posing approach, quickly contracting and relaxing muscles to cause a jerk, or can be a sudden stop in the dancer's body, referred to as a "pose", "pop" or a "hit". This is done continuously to the rhythm of a song, in combination with various movements and poses.

The dance was first televised and popularized by Boogaloo groups Granny & the Robotroids and the Black Messengers performing on national TV in 1976 (Robotroids), 1977 and 1978 (Black Messengers as Mechanical Device). Later, a dance group called the Electric Boogaloos, which mixed popping techniques with boogaloo foundation from the San Francisco Bay Area. Closely related dance styles and techniques are often integrated into popping to create a more varied performance. These dance styles include the robot, waving and tutting. However, popping is distinct from breaking and locking, with which it is often confused. A popping dancer is commonly referred to as a "popper".

Popping developed before hip hop and helped influence the tradition of styles of hip hop dancing. It is often performed in battles, in which participants try to outperform each other in front of a crowd, giving room for improvisation and freestyle moves that are seldom seen in shows and performances, such as interaction with other dancers and spectators. Popping, and related styles such as waving and tutting, have also been incorporated into the electronica dance scene to some extent, influencing new styles such as liquid and digits and turfing.

== Terminology ==
As stated earlier, popping has become the latest umbrella term for a group of closely related styles and techniques rooted in the boogaloo tradition that have often been combined, evolved or danced together with popping, some of which are seldom seen outside of popping contexts.

== Characteristics ==
Popping is centered around the technique of "popping", which means to quickly contract and relax muscles to create a jerking effect (a "pop" or "hit") in the body. It is also known as posing hard from the boogaloo tradition; this technique was innovated by the Oakland-based boogaloo group the Black Messengers. Popping can be concentrated to specific body parts, creating variants such as arm pops, leg pops, chest pops and neck pops.

== Music ==
With its roots in the late 1970s funk era, popping is commonly danced to funk and disco music. Popular artists include Zapp, Dayton, Dazz Band and Cameo. During the 1980s, many poppers also utilized electro music, with artists such as Kraftwerk, Yellow Magic Orchestra, Egyptian Lover and World Class Wrecking Crew. More mainstream hip hop music was also employed by poppers during the 1980s, including Afrika Bambaataa, Kurtis Blow, Whodini and Run-DMC. Today, it is common to see popping danced to more current music genres, such as modern hip hop (often abstract/instrumental hip hop) and various forms of electronic dance music, such as dubstep.

Poppers generally favor music with a straight and steady beat of 90–120 beats per minute, a 4/4 time signature, and a strong emphasis on the back beat, normally by a snare drum or a drum machine. The pops are generally performed on every beat or on the distinct back beats. The popper can also choose to follow the music more freely, such as by timing the pops to the rhythm of a melody or other rhythmic elements.

== Variations ==
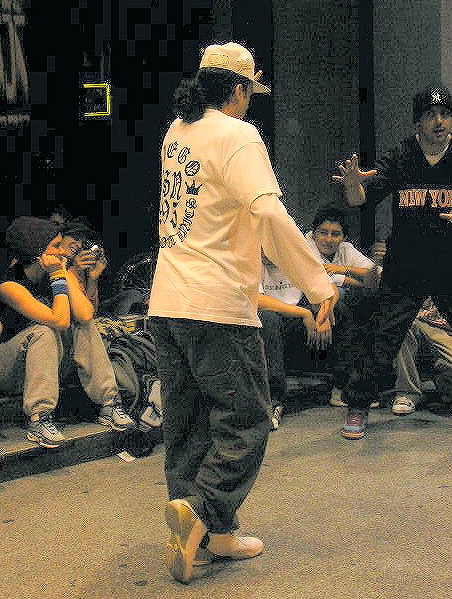
A street dancer doing the backslide or "moonwalk", a common move in the floating style often seen combined with popping

Animation
A style and a technique where the dancer imitates film characters being animated by stop motion. The technique of moving rigidly and jerky by tensing muscles and using techniques similar to strobing and the robot makes it appear as if the dancer has been animated frame by frame. Walt Disney was the first to use this term, referring to his character Steam Boat Willie’s motions as "the animation dance" in 1929. This style was heavily inspired by the dynamation films created by Ray Harryhausen, such as The Seventh Voyage of Sinbad (1958).

Boogaloo
Boogaloo or "bug'n" is an older umbrella name of funk dances originating in Oakland, California. It can be described as a free-form dance style with loose movements trying to give the impression of a body lacking bones, partly inspired by animated movies and cartoons. It utilizes circular rolls of various body parts, such as the hips, chest, shoulders, knees and head; this technique is also referred to as "wormin" and isolates sections of the body toward funk rhythms, especially sectioning through separating the rib cage from the hip. "Wormin" was innovated by Jerry Rentie of One Plus One., and the rolling of the chest or "wiggling" was innovated by Donald "Duck" Mathews. It also makes heavy use of angles and various steps and transitions to get from one spot to the next.

Tutting/King Tut
Inspired by the art of Ancient Egypt (the name derived from the Egyptian pharaoh Tutankhamun, colloquially known as "King Tut"), tutting exploits the body's ability to create geometric positions (such as boxes) and movements, predominantly with the use of right angles. It generally focuses on the arms and hands, and includes sub-styles such as finger tutting.

== Notable poppers ==
- Boogaloo Shrimp (aka Michael Chambers)
- Popin' Pete
- Nonstop
- Mr. Wiggles
- Suga Pop
- Salah
- Skeeter Rabbit
- Slim Boogie
- Mr. Animation
- Poppin John

== See also ==
- Hip-hop dance
- Locking (dance)
- Turfing
