= Emmett Kelly =

American clown (1898–1979)

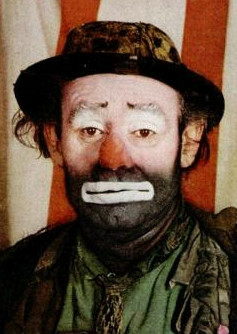
- Kelly ca. 1953
- Born: Emmett Leo Kelly; December 9, 1898; Sedan, Kansas, US
- Died: March 28, 1979 (aged 80); Sarasota, Florida, US
- Resting place: Rest Haven Memorial Park, Lafayette, Indiana
- Other name: Weary Willie
- Occupation: Circus clown
- Years active: 1910-1979
- Spouses: Eva Mae Moore (m. 1923; div. 1935); Elvira Gebhardt (m. 1955)
- Children: Emmett Leo Kelly Jr.; Patrick Kelly; Stasia Kelly; Monika Kelly

Emmett Leo Kelly (December 9, 1898 – March 28, 1979) was an American circus performer who created the clown character "Weary Willie", based on the hobos of the Great Depression in the 1930s.

== Early life ==
Emmett Leo Kelly was born in Sedan, Kansas, on December 9, 1898. His father, Thomas, was a section foreman for the Missouri Pacific Railroad. While he was still a child, the family moved to Southern Missouri where his father had purchased a farm in Texas County, near the community of Houston, Missouri. In the summer of 1909, he attended both the Mighty Haag and M.L. Clark and Son's circuses.

As a youth, he was enrolled by his mother, Mollie, in the Landon School of Cartooning, a correspondence school where he began developing his artistic skill.

In 1917, Kelly moved to Kansas City, hoping to get a job as a newspaper cartoonist. It was there that he created a cartoon of a tramp that he originally named "Old Dubey". While in Kansas City, Kelly began working for carnivals and circuses and trained as a trapeze artist.

In August 1920, Kelly returned to his adopted hometown of Houston, Missouri where he appeared as a "cartoonist and comedy specialist" at the town's annual "Old Settlers Reunion".

== Early circus career ==
Kelly's first professional appearance as a clown was with Howe's Great London Circus on July 14, 1921, in Mason City, Iowa. Although he originally performed as a white-face clown, it was during that tour that he first appeared as a hobo character. After only a few performances as a tramp, Kelly returned to more traditional makeup, but not before a photograph was made of the character which would later be identified as "Weary Willie." The photo appeared in the Howe's Great London Route Book of 1921 above a caption that read: "Emmett Kelly, The Novelty Clown, Cartoonist, Tramp".

At the end of the 1921 tour, the Howe's Great London Circus and Van Amburgh's Trained Wild Animal Show was acquired by the American Circus Corporation. In 1922 Kelly was assigned to perform his single trapeze act in the corporation's John Robinson Circus.

Kelly returned to John Robinson in 1923 and was part of a program that included eight members of the Moore family. The large troupe appeared in several displays including a double trapeze act featuring sisters Mitzi and Eva. Kelly married Eva in Charlottesville, Virginia, on July 21, 1923, and the pair began performing together on the trapeze.

The couple returned to the show in 1924, and as the season progressed, Emmett and Eva learned that they were expecting a child. On November 24, the last day of the John Robinson season, Emmett Kelly Jr. was born in Dyersburg, Tennessee.

On September 12, 1929, John Ringling purchased the American Circus Corporation. Included in the deal was the John Robinson show, along with the Al G. Barnes, Sparks, Sells-Floto and Hagenbeck-Wallace circuses.

As the economy suffered in 1930, disposable income dried up, and for many, circus tickets became a luxury. The John Robinson Circus, the oldest in the United States, was among the first to close, giving its final performance on September 5 at the Nebraska State Fair in Lincoln.

Although fewer shows toured in 1931, The Aerial Kellys were among several acts that moved from John Robinson to the Ringling-owned Sells-Floto circus. Despite the fact that cowboy movie star Tom Mix was heavily promoted as a feature, Sells-Floto struggled. While the Kellys still considered themselves trapeze performers, Emmett was hired as a white-face clown with the Ringling-owned Hagenbeck-Wallace circus in 1932.

A year later, the hobo character that had first been created on a drawing board in Kansas City came to life. Ragged homeless men were commonplace during the Depression, and on April 21, 1933, the tramp clown made his first appearance during a performance at the Chicago Coliseum.

In early 1934 a second child, Patrick, was born. At the end of the year, Hagenbeck-Wallace manager Jess Adkins, along with former Sells-Floto manager Zack Terrell, partnered to start their own show, the Cole Bros. and Clyde Beatty Combined Circus. Kelly was among those who made the jump from Hagenbeck-Wallace, although his wife Eva was not given a contract. Shortly after the season started, she asked for a divorce. Kelly later wrote that the sadness he experienced at the time worked its way into the character's persona.

In 1937, newspaper writer Hype Igho described the sad clown as "Weary Willie." Igho had written about the act by using a term that originated decades earlier as a generic description for a nameless hobo. Kelly later said that Igho encouraged him to use the name and overnight, the character that had once referred to as Old Dubey became Weary Willie.

During the winter of 1937–38, Kelly was hired to perform with the Bertram Mills Circus at the Olympia in London. It was at his European debut that he put his own spin on a routine that a veteran clown named Charlie "Shorty" Flem had performed years earlier at Madison Square Garden.

The act, which would become Kelly's signature routine, began with him sweeping the ring. A spotlight followed him, and as it danced about, he slapped, swept, and chased the pool of light with his broom. Once he completed the spotlight routine, Willie blew up a balloon until it popped, and then pantomiming his sorrow, he buried the remains in the sawdust.

== Broadway and Hollywood ==
When World War II broke out in September 1939, Kelly returned to the United States where he was cast in a new Broadway musical starring Jimmy Durante and Ray Bolger. The show, titled Keep Off the Grass, was set in New York's Central Park, where Weary Willie appeared as one of several tramps, including an up-and-comer named Jackie Gleason, who was also making his Broadway debut.

Despite the star power of Durante and Bolger, Keep Off the Grass did not receive good notices. The only positive review came from the Time critic who wrote: "...and there's a bum, Emmett Kelly, who would leisurely proceed to eat a ham sandwich out of a paper poke while a bunch of other bums sang a park bench song; then he would lazily brush his teeth with the dry stub of a toothbrush, which provides the one moment of an otherwise uninspired show."

Keep off the Grass closed after only 44 performances, and Kelly returned to the nightclub circuit as a cartoonist dressed as a tramp. Even though he would appear in rooms that were often noisy, Willie never uttered a word, but, as one newspaper noted, "with lightning speed he would knock out about eight cartoons in less time than you can write your name."

== Ringling Bros. and Barnum & Bailey ==
For a year and a half Emmett made his living performing in nightclubs and indoor circuses until early 1941, when he received offers from both Ringling Bros. and Barnum & Bailey and Cole Bros. After considering both opportunities, Kelly opted to go with Cole Bros., which promised a higher salary.

In the five years since Kelly had appeared under canvas in the United States, he honed his craft and matured as a performer to the point that the Cole Bros. publicity department touted him as "the world's funniest clown." The stories that were placed in newspapers in advance of the circus described, and occasionally embellished, details associated with his tour of the United Kingdom.

The positive reviews caught the attention of Ringling Bros. and Barnum & Bailey, and in 1942 he joined the circus for the first of fourteen seasons with the show. In 1944, the character that Kelly had created was cast as the star in the featured spectacle. Panto's Paradise was staged as a "dream of a hobo in fairyland."

== Hartford circus fire ==
Although "Panto's Paradise" was Willie's big number in 1944, his first appearance occurred earlier in the program when the Wallendas were performing on the high wire. During the act, Willie would stand under their rigging, holding a small handkerchief as if to catch them should they fall. The gag had been getting laughs all season, and on July 6, while the circus was in Hartford, Connecticut, there was no reason to believe that anything would be different.

"As I was putting the finishing touches on my face, I could hear the band playing the waltz music that was my cue to amble into the center ring. At that instant someone ran past the dressing tent yelling ‘fire.’ I was trying to run in my big flapping shoes and suddenly realized that I was carrying a bucket of wash water I had grabbed when I left the dressing tent."

Kelly said that when he saw the big top burning, he knew that he had to help the panicked crowd exit the tent. It was then that he spotted flames burning near one of the large generator wagons. As he tried to douse the small fire with his bucket of water, he nearly became a casualty himself. "One of the Caterpillar tractors came rumbling along to get that wagon – to hook on and pull it away from the crowd," he recalled. "It was almost on top of me before I realized what was happening, and as it swung around it did not miss running over me by more than an inch."

Kelly's actions that day were immortalized by audience member Ralph Emerson, who took a photograph of Kelly in his full clown make-up and costume, carrying a single bucket of water. The photograph was published in Life on July 17, 1944.

The fire and the loss of 168 lives had a profound impact on Kelly. That night, after the victims had been transported to a temporary morgue, he reflected on what had happened. "Leaving the showgrounds, I walked past the ruins of the big top and saw some charred shoes and part of a clown doll lying on what had been the hippodrome track. That moment was when the tensions of the past hours broke over me in a wave and I could not keep from crying any longer."

The fire investigation delayed the show's departure from Hartford for nine days, but on July 15 the trains were headed back to Sarasota, Florida, and within a month, the circus had resumed its tour, playing in stadiums and ballparks. Emmett was among those impressed by the resilience of the big show, telling a reporter "We must entertain. In war time it is more important than ever. It is going to be great in the open air."

== Return to Hollywood ==
In 1949, after a charity circus performance in Los Angeles, Emmett was approached by an agent representing David O. Selznick. On October 8, while Ringling Bros. and Barnum & Bailey was in Tucson, Arizona, Kelly signed an exclusive one-year contract.

At the age of 51, the idea of starting a new career in motion pictures appealed to Kelly, and when the circus closed in Miami, Florida on November 25, he immediately left for California and Hollywood.

In the months that followed various ideas were pitched, until finally he was given a script based on a radio mystery series titled The Fat Man. In the film, Kelly would be cast as the villain. Although the idea intrigued him, as he read the script, he became concerned. The storyline called for the character to murder three people, then take money that he had stolen from one of the victims and start a circus where he would hide behind his clown makeup. And they wanted Emmett to appear in the film as Willie.

The idea of turning his beloved character into a murderer was unacceptable. The producer and director of the film agreed that the killer should not depict the same character that Emmett had spent his career developing. In its review of the film, The New York Times, praised Kelly's acting ability and noted, "As the ex-convict clown, Mr. Kelly herein demonstrates that circus rings need not be his sole field."

Following the release of The Fat Man, Kelly's agent reached out to Cecil B. DeMille who was in Sarasota filming early scenes for The Greatest Show on Earth. The circus allowed Emmett to leave the tour for 15 weeks so that he could join James Stewart and Betty Hutton on the Paramount backlot. Unlike his featured role in The Fat Man, Kelly speaks only one word in the DeMille epic. In the middle of the train wreck scene, Hutton told Emmett to get the clowns ready for the parade, and Kelly responded, "Parade?" According to Emmett, it took two takes to get it right.

Willie appeared in several other scenes that were shot on the Hollywood soundstage, including a number with Hutton and Stewart where the three bounced on a trampoline. In the scene Willie unsuccessfully tried to eat a sandwich as Stewart and Hutton sang the song "Be a Jumping Jack."

Emmett said that his favorite scene in the film was the segment that showed him playing solitaire on top of a wagon as the circus paraded through the streets of Sarasota. As Willie placed his cards down, his game was interrupted by a sudden gust of wind. Emmett said the effect was accomplished by the blast of an air hose as he played cards against a yellow screen. The special effect was then matched against the parade sequence that had been filmed in February before the season started.

Although Kelly accompanied the Hollywood cast to Washington, D.C., and Philadelphia for the scenes filmed there, the only scenes where he appeared under canvas were during a clown walkaround, the Zoppe riding act, and the aerial ballet. In the big production number filmed on May 22, 1951, Willie strummed a ukulele as Dorothy Lamour sang "Lovely Luawana Lady". The rest of his scenes were filmed at Paramount in Hollywood.

== Author and later career ==
In 1954, Kelly met a 21-year-old acrobat named Evi Gebhardt who was part of an act known as The Four Whirlwinds. Their courtship coincided with the release of his autobiography, Clown, My Life in Tatters and Smiles, co-authored with Ringling press agent F. Beverly Kelley. The story, published by Prentice-Hall, started appearing in bookstores while the circus was at Madison Square Garden that spring. As part of the promotion, Kelly made numerous appearances at bookstores and on radio, and on March 26, 1954, he was one of the first guests to be interviewed on Edward R. Murrow’s new CBS television program Person to Person.

One of those who was captivated by Emmett's life story was actor Henry Fonda, who had read the book while he was filming Mister Roberts in the spring of 1954. By that summer, Fonda acquired the film rights and began making plans to produce the story, either as a television program or a full-length motion picture.

Because Emmett's entire life story could not be told in a half-hour, the program focused on his transition from trapeze artist to clown, with Fonda wearing Willie's makeup and actress Dorothy Malone playing Kelly's first wife, Eva. Clown appeared on the CBS television network on March 27, 1955, and was hosted by Ronald Reagan.

The program was filmed on a soundstage at Republic Studios and used the equipment of Herbert Weber's Circo Flamante. During the program, Weber performed on the wire along with the DeWayne teeterboard troupe, Hap Hadley's elephant, and Winston's seals. Faye and Rosie Alexander doubled for Emmett and Eva during the flying return sequence.

As part of the publicity blitz for Ringling's 1955 New York engagement, Emmett appeared on another CBS program less than a month later. On April 20, Weary Willie and the Four Whirlwinds appeared on I've Got a Secret. Emmett's secret was the fact that he was getting married the next day to one of the girls in the Whirlwinds’ tumbling act, Evi Gebhardt.

When, on November 6, Evi gave birth to their daughter Stasia, a news photographer named Frank Beatty snapped a picture of a grinning Weary Willie as he spoke by telephone to the new mother. At the same time Beatty was shooting his picture of Emmett, a separate photographer had been dispatched to Sarasota where a photo of Evi and Stasia was also recorded, capturing both sides of the touching telephone conversation.

After 14 years with Ringling Bros. and Barnum & Bailey. The year 1955 was Emmett's last season with the circus. Although he was already widely recognized, his family responsibilities, along with new opportunities, were the catalysts that propelled his career to new heights.

In the winter of 1956, Kelly was hired to play the role of Willie Voight in an upcoming television program titled The Captain from Kopenick. Under the terms of his 1956 circus contract, Kelly would appear with Ringling only during the indoor dates in New York and at the Boston Garden.

On March 11, 1956, the sad-faced Willie was the first guest on the hit television show What's My Line? Because the character was so well known, each of the panelists was required to put on a mask before Willie appeared on camera. The interview segment that followed was a classic as Emmett stayed in character throughout, never speaking and responding only with a grunt. After Arlene Francis peppered Willie with questions for five minutes, she correctly identified his occupation as a clown and said, while still blindfolded, "The only clown's name that comes to my mind is Emmett Kelly".

The circus was plagued with labor problems in 1956, and prior to its New York premiere, a picket line was set up outside of Madison Square Garden by both the Teamsters and the American Guild of Variety Artists. Many performers loyal to the circus were conflicted because of their membership in AGVA. Kelly, as well as clown Felix Adler and ringmaster Harold Ronk, chose not to cross the picket line, and their contracts were terminated.

Within weeks, Weary Willie was appearing in a 45-minute stage show at New York's Roxy Theatre. Circus preceded a feature film and included acrobats, animal acts, and trapeze artists, along with performers on ice skates.

== Brooklyn Dodgers ==
In 1957, attendance for the Brooklyn Dodgers was declining, and owner Walter O'Malley was considering moving the team to Los Angeles. In early January, O'Malley hired Kelly as the official mascot of the team, and in his role, Weary Willie would "characterize all of Brooklyn when the team loses, and a happy bum when the team wins."

Late in the 1957 season, on the same day that the Dodgers lost the opener during what would be the "Bums" final homestand ever in Brooklyn, Evi Kelly gave birth in New York to their second daughter, Monika.

== Hollywood, nightclubs and featured clown ==
When the baseball season ended and the announcement was made that the Dodgers would be moving to Los Angeles, Kelly was cast in the film Wind Across the Everglades, a movie that was written, produced, and directed by Budd Schulberg, the same filmmaker who had won Best Picture with On the Waterfront in 1954.

The story was set in the early 20th century and told the true tale of poachers who would hunt for egrets and other birds so that they could sell their plumes for women's hats. Emmett was part of an eclectic [one reviewer said "preposterous"] cast which included singer Burl Ives, stripper Gypsy Rose Lee, boxer Tony Galento, singer Chana Eden, Christopher Plummer, and Peter Falk. In the film, Emmett played the role of Bigamy Bob, a cutthroat who escaped to the Everglades to get away from his many wives.

With another film credit under his belt, Emmett reiterated that he had no intention of retiring his classic character and that he planned "to bring Willie to the public for as long as I can".

The opportunity to return to the circus ring presented itself in the spring of 1958, when amusement park owner Irving Rosenthal convinced George Hamid and Jerry Collins to combine forces and present the Clyde Beatty & Hamid-Morton Combined Circus under canvas. The show was set up at Rosenthal's Palisades Amusement Park in Fort Lee, New Jersey and competed directly against Ringling Bros. and Barnum & Bailey at Madison Square Garden.

With no contract that tied him to any individual show, when Beatty-Hamid-Morton closed at Palisades Park, Emmett was hired by the Cristiani Bros. Circus to appear at its big stands in Philadelphia and Chicago in 1958.

The success that Palisades Park in 1958 encouraged Irving Rosenthal to buy out the newly-titled Clyde Beatty-Cole Bros. for six weeks in 1959. For Emmett, it was a busy year. After spending five days in January with Cristiani Bros. in Miami, he traveled to both New York and Chicago in February where he made appearances at the big auto shows in those cities. In March, Emmett returned to Palisades Park for the 45-day Beatty-Cole engagement, which again was presented day-and-date against Ringling Bros. and Barnum & Bailey at Madison Square Garden.

The following year, Emmett was back at Palisades Park with the "Royal International Circus," produced by Hunt Bros., and when Clyde Beatty-Cole Bros. opened its 1961 season, he was a featured attraction for the first three dates of the season, opening indoors at Commack, Long Island, followed by the New Haven Arena, and then back under canvas at Palisades Park.

In 1958, CBS built a new 28-acre amusement park on the Santa Monica beach. Pacific Ocean Park was created to compete directly with Disneyland, and in the summer of 1959, Emmett Kelly was hired for 19 weeks to serve as "Vice President in Charge of Fun."

The idea of performing in one place for an extended period appealed to Emmett and Evi, and in 1962, Kelly began a long-term relationship with casino owner Bill Harrah. For the next 15 years, Weary Willie was a regular at the South Shore Room at Harrah's in Lake Tahoe, co-starring with celebrities including Sammy Davis Jr., Lawrence Welk, Jack Benny, Andy Williams, the Smothers Brothers, Ed Sullivan, and Carol Channing. At John Ascuaga’s Nugget in Reno, he and Red Skelton performed together and established a strong friendship.

In 1967, he starred in a musical motion picture titled The Clown and the Kids. The movie was filmed in Bulgaria.

As Emmett grew older, his acting ability, along with the complexity of his character, made him a favorite for producers looking to evoke emotion from their audience. In 1973, at the age of 74, Willie was cast in the Boston Opera production of The Bartered Bride. The producer, Sarah Caldwell, was renowned for creating variations of standard operas, and this was no exception.

The opera, which was punctuated by scenes of Soviet tanks entering Prague and images of Adolf Hitler, also included an important circus scene where Willie performed both the spotlight routine and made a solo appearance which involved a balloon, a dove, and a pistol. Emmett's association with the avant-garde opera generated headlines nationwide. The New York Times said, "Mr. Kelly, like any great performer, has the kind of tact not to seem intrusive even while clowning. His nibbling at a cabbage leaf while he listened to stuttering Vasek's lament was unforgettable."

Although Emmett Kelly had been a household name for decades, it was television that exposed Willie to millions of people who never would have attended the circus. Throughout the 1960s and 1970s, a new generation came to know the tramp character through those appearances – among them, a guest spot on Bette Midler’s first network television special which aired just before Christmas 1977. The NBC program was produced by Aaron Russo, one of Hollywood's biggest producers at the time. The program included the spotlight routine and a poignant segment where Midler sang the sentimental song "Hello in There" to Willie.

Although he never retired, he could now be very selective in his public appearances, and that flexibility allowed Emmett and Evi to become prominent citizens in Sarasota while at the same time embracing the area's circus heritage. When Karl Wallenda produced the first Showfolks Circus in 1967, Willie and the spotlight were a featured act. In the years that followed, Emmett became a sought-after speaker at circus symposia, and in 1976, he appeared in a one-man show at the new Van Wezel Performing Arts Hall, accompanied by the Sarasota Concert Band.

While Willie was still regularly seen on television commercials and special programs, his last appearances in the circus ring came in a pair of shows produced by Paul Kaye in 1974 at the Capital Centre arena in Landover, Maryland. The all-star production, Circus America, featured The Wallendas, Carol and Wayne Zacchini, Tarzan Zerbini, and The Nerveless Nocks, but the star of the show was Emmett Kelly.

After the Circus America date, Paul Kaye hired Emmett to appear in another show that nearly ended in tragedy. The circus was to be held in Hawaii at the Honolulu International Center. As the troupe was checking luggage at Los Angeles International Airport, a terrorist bomb went off in a nearby locker. "At first I thought it was a joke," Emmett told a reporter. "Then when I saw the smoke and flying glass, I got scared as hell." The explosion killed three people and injured 36 others. Despite the bombing, the performers eventually made their way to Honolulu. Not long after, investigators arrested a Yugoslavian immigrant who was later convicted of murder and sentenced to life in prison.

== Death ==
On December 9, 1978, Emmett Kelly celebrated his 80th birthday, and although he had been growing visibly weaker, he never stopped working. In February 1979, Emmett appeared in a segment on NBC's Today Show, and director Mario Pellegrini cast him in a film with Tony Bennett.

A Gift of Love was scheduled to begin production in Sarasota on April 2, 1979, and although the picture was later dedicated to Emmett, he did not appear in it. On March 28, 1979, four days before filming was scheduled to begin, the man who had described himself as "just a farm boy," who had become a world-wide icon, died of a heart attack in the front yard of his home.

As the news spread, tributes began rushing in. Among those sending condolences was comedienne Carol Burnett, a favorite of Emmett's with whom he had shared the stage on several occasions. "I had the amazing pleasure and privilege of working with Emmett Kelly," she said, "and I considered him to be a truly gentle clown."

His long-time friend Red Skelton was saddened. "Emmett was humanity himself," he said, adding, "You know it is funny such a beautiful leaf fell in the spring. I think we can look at it kind of like he is going out on tour. I guess the angels needed a laugh."

== Honors ==
On August 9, 1956 the Kelly family visited his adopted hometown of Houston, Missouri when the town renamed the open area where he gave his first performance at the "Old Settlers Reunion" in 1920 as "Emmett Kelly Park" in his honor. Nineteen years later Kelly returned to Houston for a final time when Governor Christopher Bond recognized Houston's former resident by declaring October 9, 1975 as "Emmett Kelly Day" in Missouri. Since then the annual "Emmett Kelly Clown Festival" has attracted clowns from across the region, including Kelly's grandson, Joey Kelly, who returned to perform as a special guest in 2007. Although the festival ended its original 21-year run in May 2008, it returned in April 2022 when Kelly's daughter, Stasia, was presented with a key to the city.

Kelly was inducted into the Circus Ring of Fame in Sarasota, Florida in 1988 and International Circus Hall of Fame in Peru, Indiana in 1994. On May 1, 1996, a bust of Kelly was dedicated in the "Hall of Famous Missourians" at the state capitol in Jefferson City, Missouri.

== Legacy ==
Kelly's son, Emmett Kelly Jr., performed a similar "Weary Willie" character and as a result the two were estranged for many years. Kelly Jr. died in 2006.

According to the documentary Halloween Unmasked, the choice for the mask of the film's fictional serial killer Michael Myers was down to two: a modified Captain Kirk mask and an Emmett Kelly mask. While the Emmett Kelly mask was unsettling and eerie, it did not quite evoke the creepy feeling they were seeking. The Kirk mask did, resulting in the crew selecting it for the film.

In the 2024 poker-themed video game Balatro, Kelly serves as the design inspiration for a Joker named Vagabond. This joker's ability is to spawn a Tarot Card powerup after playing a hand while having $4 or less.

== Gallery ==
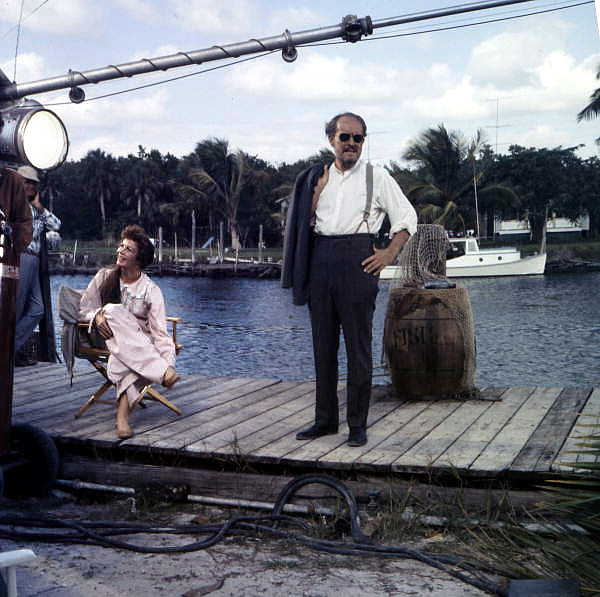
Kelly and Chana Eden in 1958 on set of Wind Across the Everglades

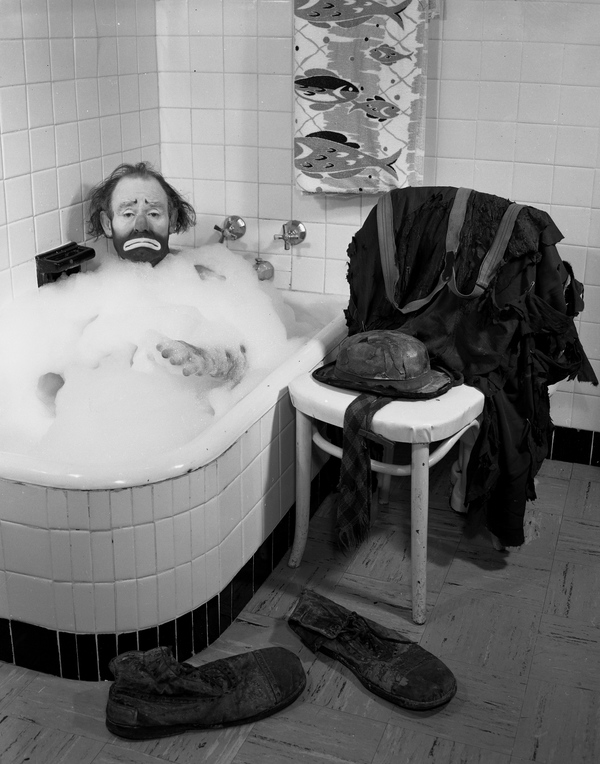
Kelly in a bubble bath (photo by Joseph Janney Steinmetz)

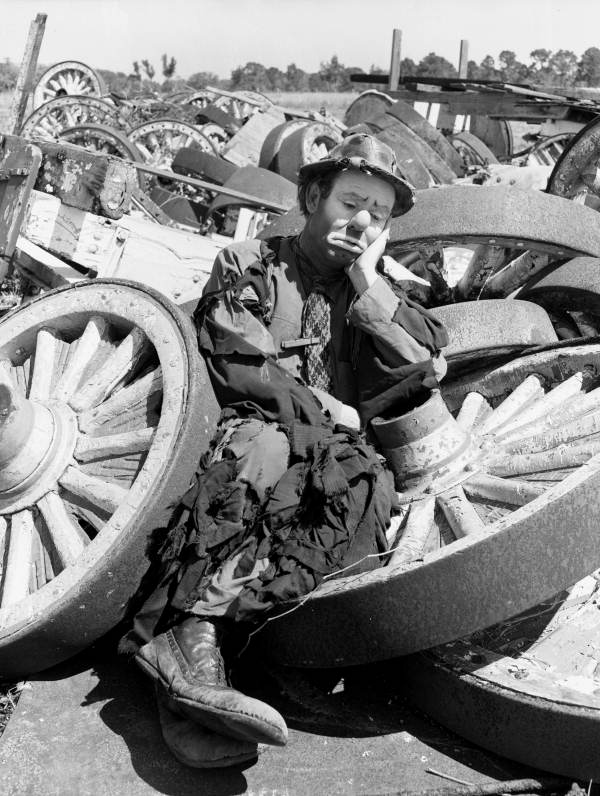
Emmett Kelly as Weary Willie

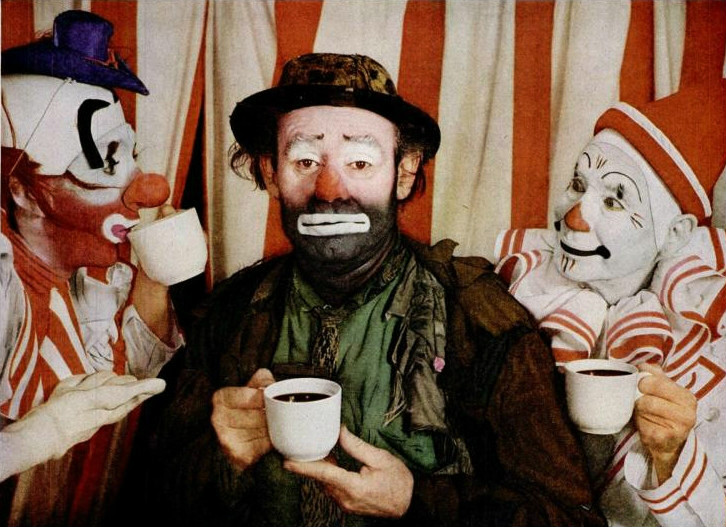
Emmett Kelly in his Weary Willie persona (center) with two Ringling Bros. whiteface clowns in a 1953 advertisement for the Pan-American Coffee Bureau

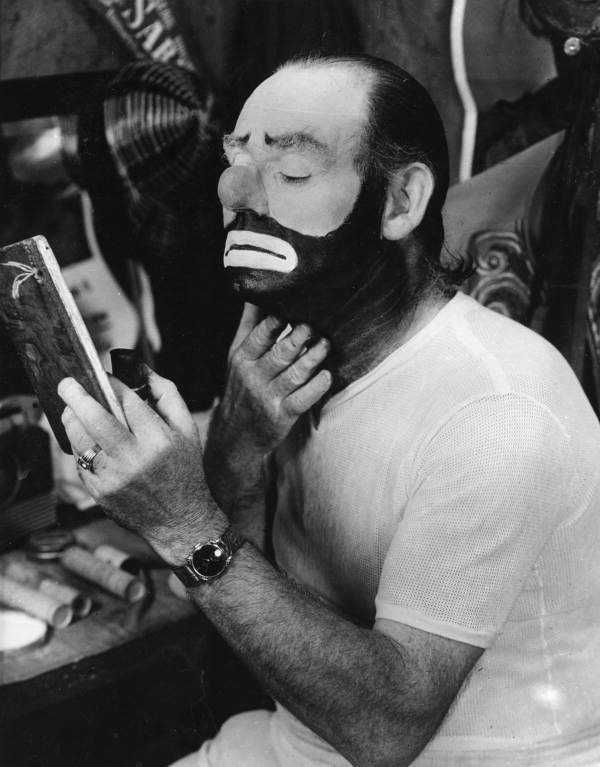
Emmett Kelly getting ready for the show – Sarasota, Florida

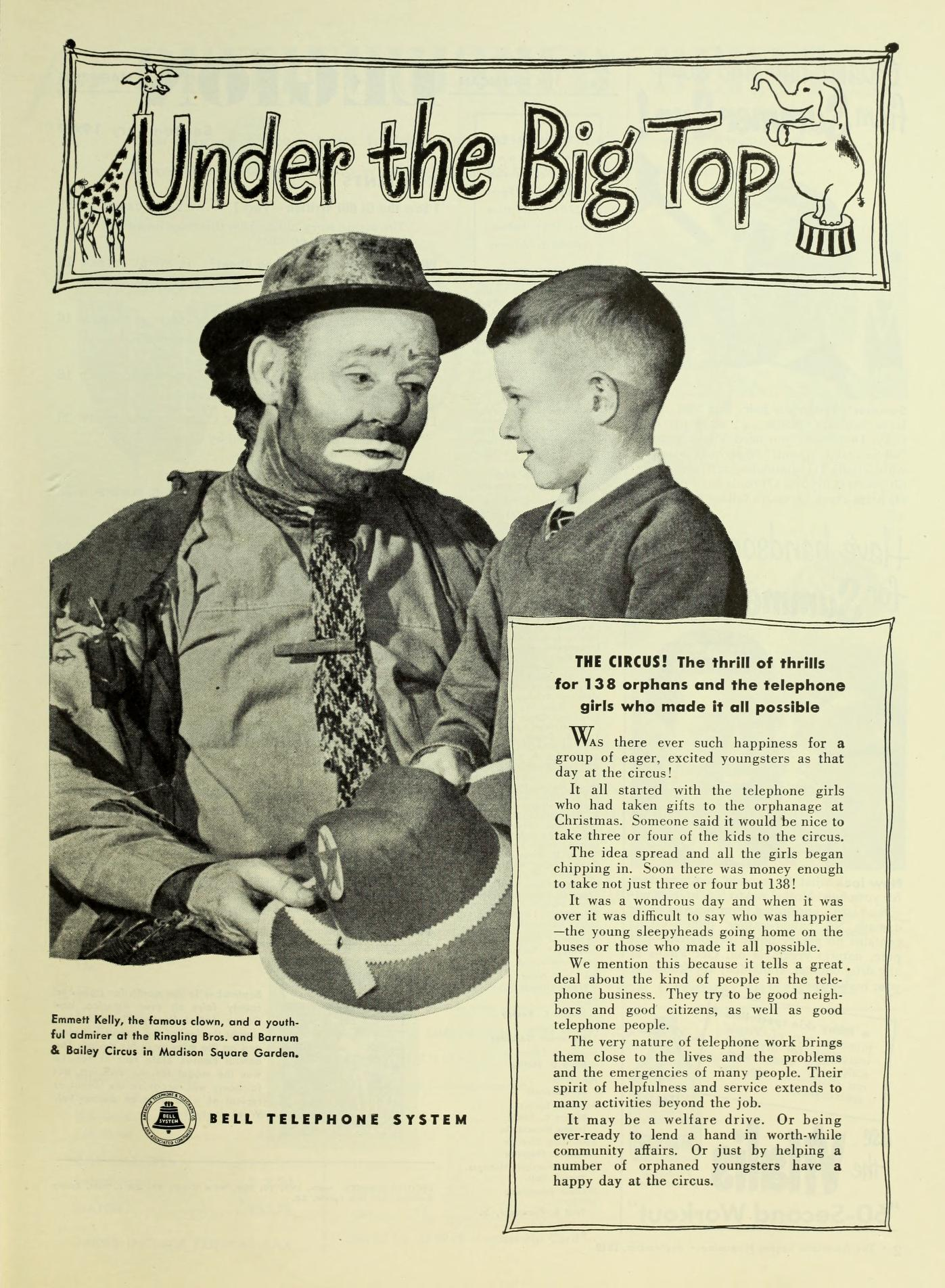
Emmett Kelly, Bell Telephone System advertisement 1949

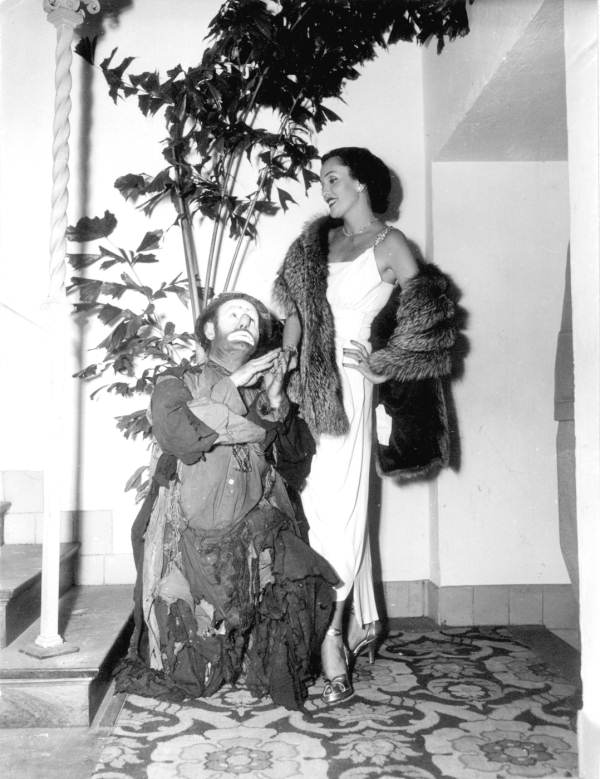
Kay Hernan and Emmett Kelly in Florida 1948

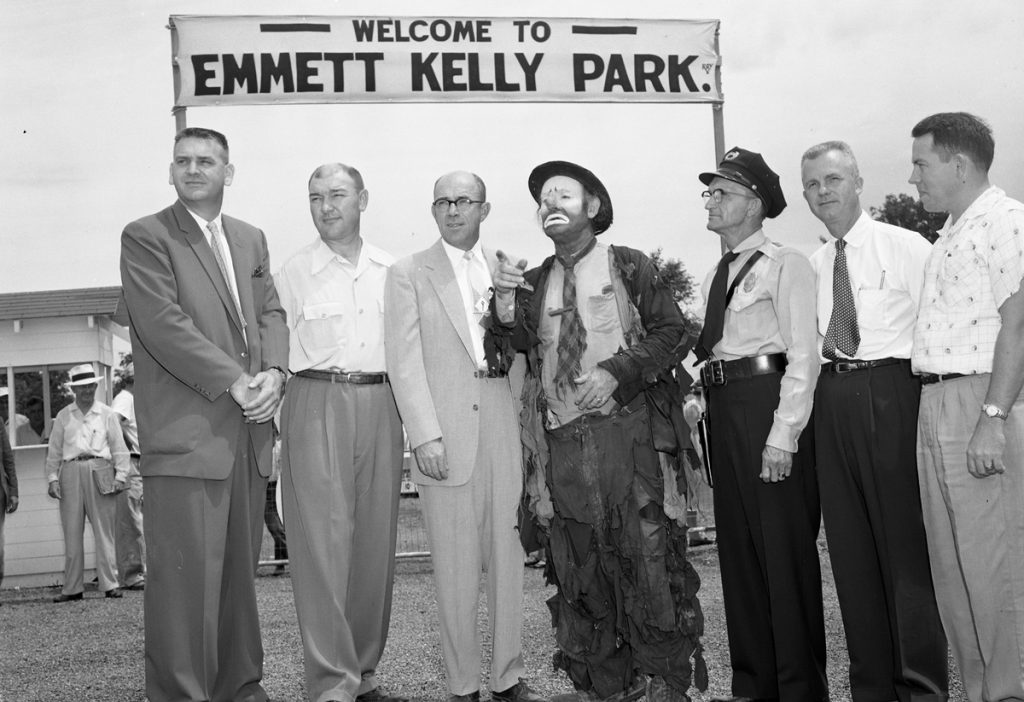
Houston, Missouri, Aug 9, 1956
