= Break (music) =

Instrumental or percussion section in a song

In popular music, a break is an instrumental or percussion section during a song derived from or related to stop-time – being a "break" from the main parts of the song or piece. A break is usually interpolated between sections of a song, to provide a sense of anticipation, signal the start of a new section, or create variety in the arrangement.

== Jazz ==
A solo break in jazz occurs when the rhythm section (piano, bass, drums) stops playing behind a soloist for a brief period, usually two or four bars leading into the soloist's first improvised solo chorus (at which point the rhythm section resumes playing). A notable recorded example is sax player Charlie Parker's solo break at the beginning of his solo on "A Night in Tunisia". While the solo break is a break for the rhythm section, for the soloist, it is a solo cadenza, where they are expected to improvise an interesting and engaging melodic line.

== DJing and dance music ==
In DJ parlance, in disco, hip-hop and electronic dance music, a break is where all the elements of a song (e.g., synth pads, basslines, vocals), except for percussion, disappear; as such, the break is also called a "percussion break".

This is distinguished from a breakdown, a section where the composition is deliberately deconstructed to minimal elements (usually the percussion or rhythm section with the vocal re-introduced over the minimal backing), all other parts having been gradually or suddenly cut out. The distinction between breaks and breakdowns may be described as, "Breaks are for the drummer; breakdowns are for electronic producers". In hip-hop music and electronica, a short break is also known as a "cut", and the reintroduction of the full bass line and drums is known as a "drop", which is sometimes accented by cutting off everything, even the percussion right before the full music is dropped back in.

== Hip-hop ==
Old-school hip-hop DJs have described the relationship between breaks, early hip-hop music, and disco. According to Afrika Bambaataa:

Now he took the music of like Mandrill, like "Fencewalk", certain disco records that had funky percussion breaks like the Incredible Bongo Band when they came out with "Apache" and he just kept that beat going. It might be that certain part of the record that everybody waits for—they just let their inner self go and get wild. The next thing you know the singer comes back in and you'd be mad.

Musicologist David Toop, based on interviews with DJ Grandmaster Flash, Kool DJ Herc, and others, has written:

Break-beat music and hip-hop culture were happening at the same time as the emergence of disco (in 1974 known as party music). Disco was also created by DJs in its initial phase, though these tended to be club jocks rather than mobile party jocks – records by Barry White, Eddie Kendricks and others became dancefloor hits in New York clubs like Tamberlane and Sanctuary and were crossed over onto radio by Frankie Crocker at station WBLS. There were many parallels in the techniques used by Kool DJ Herc and a pioneering disco DJ like Francis Grasso, who worked at Sanctuary, as they used similar mixtures and superimpositions of drumbeats, rock music, funk and African records For less creative disco DJs, however, the ideal was to slip-cute smoothly from the end of one record into the beginning of the next. They also created a context for breaks rather than foregrounding them, and the disco records which emerged out of the influence of this type of mixing tended to feature long introductions, anthemic choruses and extended vamp sections, all creating a tension which was released by the break. Break-beat music simply ate the cherry off the top of the cake and threw the rest away. In the words of DJ Grandmaster Flash, "Disco was brand new then and there were a few jocks that had monstrous sound systems but they wouldn't dare play this kind of music. They would never play a record where only two minutes of the song was all it was worth. They wouldn't buy those types of records. The type of mixing that was out then was blending from one record to the next or waiting for the record to go off and wait for the jock to put the needle back on."

DJ Kool Herc's innovative use of the break-beat came about through his observations of dancers and desire to give them what they wanted. In this case the who was b-boys (otherwise known as break-boys or breakdancers) and what they wanted was an opportunity to move explosively, express themselves, and peacock to women (Brester and Broughton 167).

== Break ==
A break may be described as when the song takes a "breather, drops down to some exciting percussion, and then comes storming back again" and compared to a false ending. Breaks usually occur two-thirds to three-quarters of the way through a song. According to Peter van der Merwe a break "occurs when the voice stops at the end of a phrase and is answered by a snatch of accompaniment", and originated from the bass runs of marches of the "Sousa school". In this case it would be a "break" from the vocal part. In bluegrass and other old-time music, a break is "when an instrument plays the melody to a song idiomatically, i.e. the back-up played on the banjo for a mandolin 'break' may differ from that played for a dobro 'break' in the same song".

According to David Toop, "the word break or breaking is a music and dance term, as well as a proverb, that goes back a long way. Some tunes, like 'Buck Dancer's Lament' from early in the nineteenth century, featured a two-bar silence in every eight bars for the break—a quick showcase of improvised dance steps. Others used the same device for a solo instrumental break; a well-known example being the four-bar break taken by Charlie Parker in Dizzy Gillespie's tune 'Night in Tunisia'."

However, in hip-hop today, the term break refers to any segment of music (usually four measures or less) that could be sampled and repeated. A break is any expanse of music that is thought of as a break by a producer. In the words of DJ Jazzy Jay: "Maybe those records [whose breaks are sampled] were ahead of their time. Maybe they were made specifically for the rap era; these people didn't know what they were making at that time. They thought, 'Oh, we want to make a jazz record'". Like the song Stereo World By Feeder and Upon This Rock by Newsboys are example that have a break and use this technique.

== Breakbeat (element of music) ==
A break beat is the sampling of breaks as (drum loop) beats, (originally found in soul or funk tracks) and their subsequent use as the rhythmic basis for hip-hop and rap. It was invented by DJ Kool Herc, a Jamaican who emigrated to New York. He is usually credited with being a pioneer of the technique of using two copies of one record so as to be able to mix between the same break, or, as Bronx DJ Afrika Bambaataa describes, "that certain part of the record that everybody waits for—they just let their inner self go and get wild", extending its length through repetition. However, it is likely that there were a number of like-minded DJs developing the technique at the same time; for example, Walter Gibbons was noted in first-hand accounts by his peers for cutting two copies of the same record in his discothèque gigs of the mid-1970s.

A particularly innovative style of street dance was created to accompany break beat-based music, and was hence referred to as "The Break", or breaking. In the 1980s, charismatic dancers like Crazy Legs, Frosty Freeze, and the Rock Steady Crew revived the breaking movement.

More recently, electronic artists have created "break beats" from other electronic music, resulting in a broad style classification itself called breakbeat. Hip-hop break beat compilations include Hardcore Break Beats and Break Beats, and Drum Drops. It was during the break beats of the song that break dancers and b-boys and girls would become the focus of attention and demonstrate their personal flair. DJ Kool Herc inspired local dancers to dance on the break beats, creating new sounds by combining the breakbeats from various songs.

== Notable examples ==
Musical ensembles which are notable for their use of breaks include the Meters, Creative Source, the J.B.'s, the Blackbyrds, and the Last Poets.

Notable breaks include:

- The Amen break from "Amen, Brother" (1969) by the Winstons The Amen break is quite often used as a second-hand sample from "Straight Outta Compton" by N.W.A, which sampled the original.
- "Apache" by the Incredible Bongo Band, sampled from the intro. Used by DJ Kool Herc, the Sugarhill Gang in "Apache", West Street Mob in "Break Dancin' – Electric Boogie".
- "Ashley's Roachclip" by Chuck Brown and the Soul Searchers. Used by Eric B & Rakim, PM Dawn, Milli Vanilli, LL Cool J and many others.
- "Funky Drummer" by James Brown, sampled roughly at 5:34. Used by Public Enemy, Run-D.M.C., LL Cool J, Ice Cube, etc.
- "Fencewalk" by Mandrill, used by DJ Kool Herc
- "Think (About It)" by Lyn Collins
- "The Bottle" by Gil Scott-Heron
- "Take Me to the Mardi Gras" by Bob James, cover of Paul Simon's "Take Me to the Mardi Gras", sampled from the intro. Used by the Crash Crew on "Breaking Bells (Take Me to the Mardi Gras)" and by Run DMC on "Peter Piper".
- "Sesame Street" by Blowfly, unique testimony of breakbeat science as the breakbeat is reconstructed from various places with solo drums in the song. Also known as "Helicopter" break after "The Helicopter Tune" by Deep Blue, which is the common second-hand source of the reconstructed sample.
- "Scorpio" by Dennis Coffey
- "Scratchin'" by Magic Disco Machine
- "Super Sporm" by Captain Sky
- "Move On Up" by Curtis Mayfield
- "It's a New Day" by Skull Snaps
- "Synthetic Substitution" by Melvin Bliss
- "Impeach the President" by the Honey Drippers
- "N.T." by Kool and the Gang
- "Tighten Up" by James Brown
- "Cold Sweat" by James Brown

== See also ==
- Breakbeat – music genre
- Breakdown – Part of a song
- Drum beat – Rhythmic pattern played on drums
- Drum solo – Single-drummer performance
- List of widely sampled drum breaks
- Ultimate Breaks and Beats
- Breakdancing – Style of street dance
- Bridge (music) – Contrasting section of music
- Get down – Action of historic African culture
- Riff – Repeated refrain in music
- Song structure – Arrangement of a song, part of the songwriting process
