= Uprock (song) =

Single by Rock Steady Crew

from the album Ready For Battle
- Released: 1984
- Genre: Old-school hip hop; electro
- Length: 5:17 (album version)
- Label: Virgin Records
- Songwriter(s): Budd "Blue Soldier" Dixon; Ruza "Kool Lady Blue" Blue; Stephen Eric Hague
- Producer(s): Blue Soldier; Stephen Hague

Rock Steady Crew singles chronology
"(Hey You) The Rock Steady Crew" (1983)	"Uprock" (1984)	"She's Fresh" (1984)

"Uprock" is a song by American hip hop group the Rock Steady Crew from their debut studio album Ready For Battle. It was released in 1984 through Charisma/Virgin Records as the album's second single. Written by Budd "Blue Soldier" Dixon, Ruza Blue and Stephen Hague, and produced by Dixon and Hague, the song refers to uprock style of dance. The single made it to the top ten in Australia and found minor success on German and UK charts, reaching peak positions #27 and #64 respectively.

== Video ==
The music video is filmed in New York City and consists of different scenes of Baby Love, Buck 4, Crazy Legs, Devious Doze, Kuriaki and Prince Ken Swift breaking in different New York environments.

== Track listing ==
All tracks are written by Budd "Blue Soldier" Dixon, Ruza "Kool Lady Blue" Blue and Stephen Hague

7" vinyl
No.	Title	Producer(s)	Length
1.	"Uprock"	Blue Soldier; Stephen Hague	3:41
2.	"Uprock" (Instrumental Version)	Blue Soldier; Stephen Hague	4:24

12" vinyl
No.	Title	Producer(s)	Length
1.	"Uprock" (Extended Version)	Blue Soldier; Stephen Hague	6:10
2.	"Uprock" (Instrumental Version)	Blue Soldier; Stephen Hague	4:30
3.	"Uprock" (7" Version)	Blue Soldier; Stephen Hague	3:35

== Charts ==
=== Weekly charts ===
Chart (1984)	Peak position
Australia (Kent Music Report)	9
Germany (GfK)	27
UK Singles (OCC)	64

=== Year-end charts ===
Chart (1984)	Position
Australia (Kent Music Report)	74
