= Ready for Battle =

Studio album by Rock Steady Crew
- Released: 1984
- Genre: Hip-hop; electro
- Label: Virgin
- Producer: Blue Soldier; Stephen Hague

Rock Steady Crew chronology
Ready for Battle (1984)	30 Years to the Day (2007)

Singles from Ready for Battle
- 1. "(Hey You) The Rock Steady Crew" Released: 1983; 2. "Uprock" Released: 1984; 3. "She's Fresh" Released: 1984

Professional ratings
Review scores
Source	Rating
AllMusic	3.5/5 stars

Ready for Battle is the debut studio album by American hip-hop group the Rock Steady Crew. It was released in 1984 via Virgin Records. The album was produced by Budd "Blue Soldier" Dixon and Stephen Hague. Ready for Battle peaked at No. 19 on the VG-lista Topp 40 Album chart and at No. 45 on the Sverigetopplistan Veckolista Album chart. It spawned three singles: "(Hey You) The Rock Steady Crew", "Uprock" and "She's Fresh".

== Track listing ==
All music is composed by Blue Soldier and Stephen Hague.

No.	Title	Writer(s)	Length
1.	"Uprock"	Budd Dixon; Ruza Blue; Stephen Hague	5:17
2.	"Me and Baby Brother"	Thomas Sylvester Allen; Harold Ray Brown; Morris Dewayne Dickerson; Lonnie Jordan; Charles Miller; Lee Oskar; Howard E. Scott	4:13
3.	"She's Fresh"	Dixon; Blue; Hague	4:03
4.	"B-Boys B-Girls"	Dixon; Blue; Hague	4:48
5.	"It's Just Begun"	Gerry Thomas; James Castor; Johnny Pruitt	4:38
6.	"(Hey You) The Rock Steady Crew"	Dixon; Blue; Hague	5:27
7.	"Digital Boogie"	Dixon; Blue; Hague	5:50

== Charts ==
Chart (1984)	Peak position
Australia (Kent Music Report)	34
Norwegian Albums (VG-lista)	19
Swedish Albums (Sverigetopplistan)	45
