= Structure the Spin Dr. =

American DJ

Structure The Spin Dr. is the stage name of DJ Jonathan DePrisco. He spent his early career as a resident DJ at large NYC nightclubs including Limelight, The Roxy. In 2009 Structure developed a reality television show entitled Party Hard about the culture of New York DJs, however the project was not picked up after the filming of the pilot.
