= McGlasson =

McGlasson is a surname. Notable people with the surname include:

- Carter "Fever One" McGlasson (born 1970), American breakdancer
- Ed McGlasson (born 1956), American football player
- Mike McGlasson (Born 1979), Professor at the University of Memphis

== See also ==
- 3300 McGlasson, main-belt asteroid
