= (Hey You) The Rock Steady Crew =

1983 single by Rock Steady Crew

Single by Rock Steady Crew

from the album Ready for Battle
- Released: September 13, 1983
- Length: 5:27; 3:47 (7-inch)
- Label: Atlantic
- Songwriters: Budd "Blue Soldier" Dixon; Ruza "Kool Lady Blue" Blue; Stephen Eric Hague
- Producers: Blue Soldier; Stephen Hague

Rock Steady Crew singles chronology
"(Hey You) The Rock Steady Crew" (1983)	"Uprock" (1984)

"(Hey You) The Rock Steady Crew" is a song by American hip-hop group the Rock Steady Crew from their debut studio album, Ready for Battle (1984). It was released in 1983 through Atlantic (in the United States), Virgin, and Charisma Records (outside the US) as the album's lead single and as the group's debut single. Written by Budd "Blue Soldier" Dixon, Ruza Blue and Stephen Hague, and produced by Dixon and Hague, the lead vocals were performed by 15 year old Daisy Castro, a.k.a. "Baby Love". The single peaked at number one on the Belgian and Dutch singles charts and reached the top 10 in several other European countries, including the United Kingdom.

== Charts ==
=== Weekly charts ===
Weekly chart performance for "(Hey You) The Rock Steady Crew"
Chart (1983–1984)	Peak position
Australia (Kent Music Report)	33
Austria (Ö3 Austria Top 40)	7
Belgium (Ultratop 50 Flanders)	1
Ireland (IRMA)	5
Netherlands (Dutch Top 40)	1
Netherlands (Single Top 100)	1
New Zealand (Recorded Music NZ)	5
Norway (VG-lista)	6
Sweden (Sverigetopplistan)	2
Switzerland (Schweizer Hitparade)	4
UK Singles (Official Charts)	6
West Germany (GfK)	6

=== Year-end charts ===
Year-end chart performance for "(Hey You) The Rock Steady Crew"
Chart (1983)	Position
Belgium (Ultratop)	33
Netherlands (Dutch Top 40)	7
Netherlands (Single Top 100)	15

Chart (1984)	Position
West Germany (GfK)	40

== Sales and certifications ==
Certifications for "(Hey You) The Rock Steady Crew"
Region	Certification	Certified units/sales
Netherlands (NVPI)	Gold	100,000^{^}
United Kingdom (BPI)	Silver	250,000^{^}
^{^} Shipments figures based on certification alone.

== See also ==
- List of number-one hits of 1983 (Flanders)
- List of Dutch Top 40 number-one singles of 1983
