= Massive Monkees =

American hip hop group

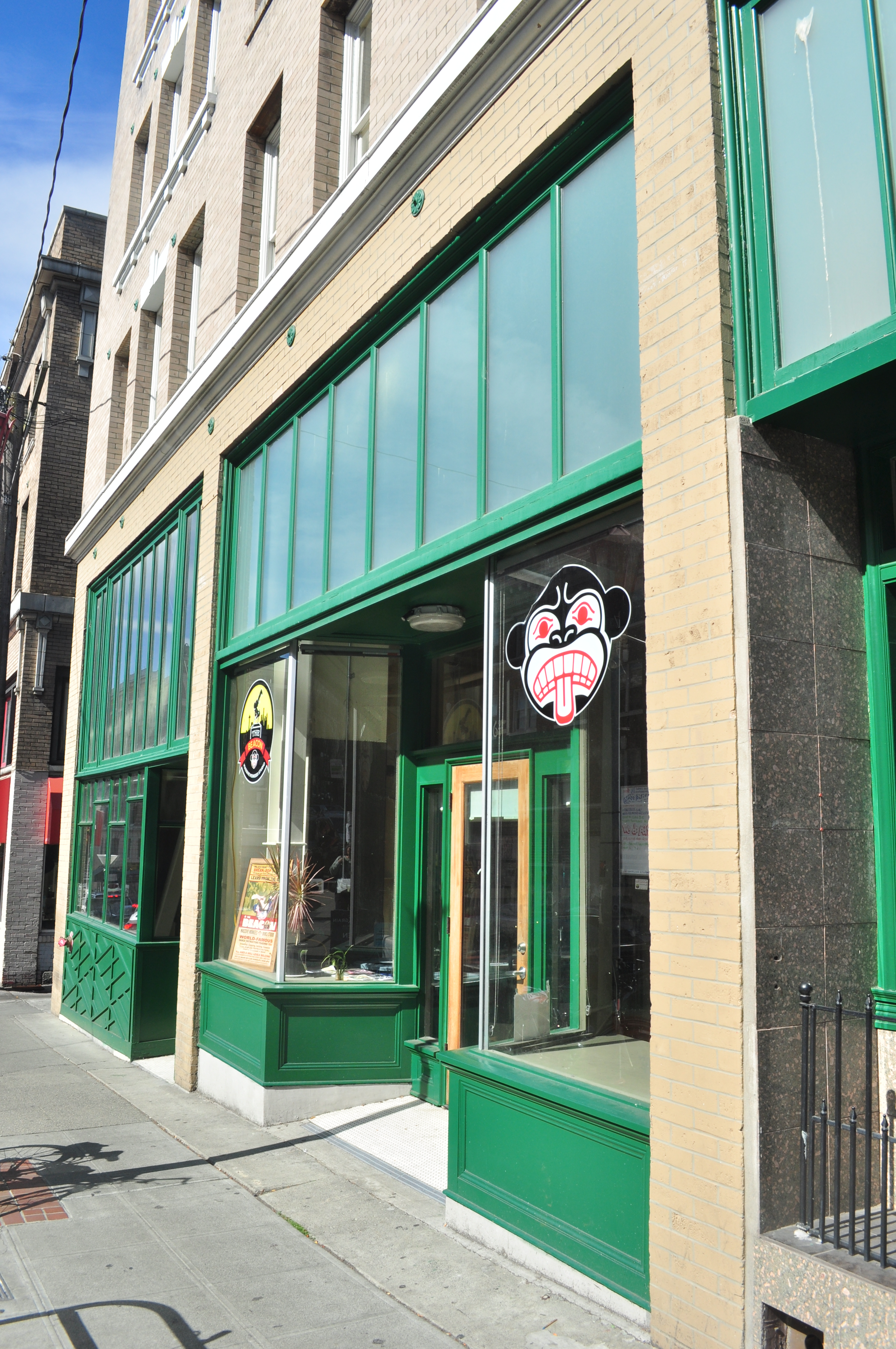
- Massive Monkees' studio "The Beacon" in the Milwaukee Hotel building on S. King Street in Seattle's International District.

Background information
- Origin: Seattle, Washington US
- Occupations: breaking, bboying, bgirling, popping, boogaloo, uprocking, DJs, Turntablism, MCs, Battle Rap, Freestyle rap, hiphop culture
- Years active: 1996-Present
- Members: Armagedden; (Galen 'Glen' Takamura); Anna Banana Freeze; (Fides Anna Mabanta); Benny Blanco; (Benito Ybarra); Cornbread206; (Marcus Rader); Dancin Domes; (Terrance Dionicio Guillermo); DJ BlesOne; (Kip Fox); Dial Tone; (Jose Antonio Orduna); DJ DV One; aka Toby Fresh; (Toby Campbell); Dubs; Fever One; (Carter McGlasson); Flow Funk; (Florentino Francisco); Geronimo; (Maurese Brownwolf); Granite Rok; (Gulliver 'Gully' Raza); Hocine; (Hocine Jouini); Hot Rod; (Rodericko Francisco); Iron Mike Brysen; aka The Chairman; aka JustB; (Brysen Angeles); Jeromeskee; (Jerome Aparis); Juggernot; (Deaunte Hall); Junior; (Filipe Orduna); JuseBoogy; (Marcus Garrison); Lil Lazy; (Samnith Ly); Lonestar; Lotuz; (Puteri Hetharia); Miguel; NamSteady; (Nam Ho); One Be Lo; Rhythm Rage; (Nollan Worrell); Salah; (Salah Benlemqawanssa); SeanSteady; Secret Skwerl; Tim the Pitt; aka The Pitt; aka Pitbull; (Timothy Soriano); Twixx; (JD Rainey); Guppy; (Jesus Rojas); Nova; (Noah Ranola); Gavitron; (Gavin); Dan The Man; (Daniel Haile); Kulani; (Kulani Chan)
- Past members: Peanut; (Phanna Nam); 1999 - 2008
- Website: Massive Monkees

Massive Monkees is a 30+ member b-boy & b-girl crew from Seattle, Washington that won the 2004 World B-Boy Championships in London and appeared on season four of MTV's America's Best Dance Crew. In 2012 they won the international b-boy competition R-16 Korea and thus became the first American crew to win in the history of the competition.

== History ==
Founded in the mid-'90s, the Massive Monkees have 25 active members including former Binary Star rapper One Be Lo, who performs as the MC at their shows. The crew was created through the merger of the Massive Crew and the Universal Style Monkees. Massive Monkees' style is viewed as that of fundamental B-boys/B-girls. Additionally, Massive Monkees performs at high schools to diffuse the notion that hip-hop and gangs go hand-in-hand.

Members of the crew have performed with and/or choreographed performances for artists such as LL Cool J, Public Enemy, Slick Rick, De La Soul, Nas, 50 Cent, Jay-Z, Ludacris, Jurassic 5, Atmosphere, Tyrese, Missy Elliott, Immortal Technique, Beyoncé, Macklemore and Alicia Keys. Members of Massive Monkees have been featured on MTV's Made, in a Kenneth Cole print advertising spread, in a promotional video for Xbox HD DVD, Showtime at the Apollo and KUBE93’s birthday party with Missy Elliott and Tyrese. The Massive Monkees were on the Vans Warped Tour, did an Xbox commercial, and helped with philanthropic efforts in Cambodia. Certain members of the Massive Monkees were featured in 5 viral videos produced by Caid Productions for the new "Coosh" headphones a subdivision of the disposable lighter and razor giant Bic. On April 26 of 2004, Seattle Mayor Greg Nickels proclaimed this day the official Massive Monkees holiday in Seattle. In 2007 they won the Mayor's Arts Award, presented by Greg Nickels.

Some members of the Massive Monkees were also a part of the Seattle SuperSonics NBA team's "Boom Squad". The Boom Squad performed at the SuperSonics home games until the team moved to Oklahoma City in 2008. They were recognized as top-notch NBA performers when they were invited to perform at the 2005 All-Star Game in Denver's Pepsi Center. Members of the crew worked on the 2008 documentary/instructional video titled The Way of the B-boy. They have also produced highlight DVDs called The 2-Oh-6 Step (Part 1 and 2), which have been sold in international markets. On April 10, 2013, Jay Park, member of associated Seattle-based b-boy crew, Art of Movement, released the music video for his single, "Joah", which features a short dance break at Massive Monkees Studio: The Beacon.

== Competitions ==
The Massive Monkees have competed in both national and international competitions. Their first major B-boy title was won at the 2000 B-boy Summit, when members Juseboogy and Twixx took the 2-man title. Since then they have won dozens of other awards including first place in the 4-on-4 category at the 2004 World B-Boy Championships that took place at London’s Wembley Arena. One of their best known battles is when they battled the Circle of Fire at the Showbox 2003 in a boxing ring. In 2009, they competed on the reality dance competition America's Best Dance Crew. They placed third in the competition after the runner-up Afroboriké and the winners We Are Heroes, and before that, in 2007 crew member TWIXX was selected to compete in the premier 1 on 1 b-boy battle, Red Bull BC-One. Recently, Massive Monkees won the international competition in the crew battle R16 Korea 2012.

=== America's Best Dance Crew ===
Massive Monkees were chosen to be one of the 9 crews fighting to become America's Best Dance Crew in the 4th season of the show. They also auditioned for the second season of ABDC, but did not make it on.

Week 1: Crews Choice Challenge: Massive Monkees went up against Artistry In Motion and Southern Movement and were picked first. Massive Monkees danced a mastermix of the song of their choice, "Kill Joy" by N.E.R.D.

Week 2: Beyoncé Challenge: For the second week of America's Best Dance Crew, the 8 remaining crews danced to Beyoncé's music. Massive Monkees had "Work It Out". Their challenge was to dance with hula-hoops.

Week 3: Martial Arts Challenge: For the third week of America's Best Dance Crew, the 7 remaining crews performed a type of Martial Arts into their routine. Massive Monkees were assigned Extreme Martial Arts with the song, "Bounce" by MSTRKRFT. Their challenge was to incorporate the 540 into their routine.

Week 4: Bollywood Challenge: In week 4 of America's Best Dance Crew, crews incorporated Bollywood within their hip-hop routine. Massive Monkees had to dance to Bhangra and "Bang" by Rye Rye featuring M.I.A.

Week 5: Dance Craze Challenge: For the fifth week of America's Best Dance Crew, the crews all were assigned a dance craze and had to use the trampoline in their performance. Massive Monkees had to do B Hamp's "Do The Ricky Bobby" on a trampoline.

Week 6: VMA Challenge: In this episode of America's Best Dance Crew, the final 4 crews danced to an iconic VMA performance. Massive Monkees were in the bottom 2. Their assigned VMA performance was "Tearin' Up My Heart" by *NSYNC, which impressed former N Sync member and judge, JC Chasez.

Week 7: Decades Of Dance and Last Chance Challenge: Massive Monkees were eliminated by We Are Heroes.

== Members ==
- Armagedden
- Anna Banana Freeze
- Benny Blanco
- Cornbread
- Dancin Domes
- DJ DV One
- Dubs
- Flow Funk
- Geronimo
- Granite Rok
- Brysen JustBe
- Jeromeskee
- JoRawk
- Juggernot
- Junior
- Mafi
- JuseBoogy
- Lil Lazy
- Lonestar
- Lotuz
- Miguel
- One Be Lo
- Peanut
- Rock'Hus
- Rodericko
- Rhythm Rage
- Salah
- Seansteady
- Secret Skwerl
- Tim the Pitt
- Twixx
