= Rock Steady Crew =

American breaking and hip-hop group

- Origin: The Bronx New York, Manhattan New York, U.S.
- Genres: East Coast hip hop; hip hop; Old-school hip hop; Turntablism; Boom bap; West Coast hip hop; Golden age hip hop; Battle rap; Freestyle rap
- Occupations: breaking, bboying, bgirling, graffiti artists, turntablists, popping, boogaloo, uprocking, rappers, singers, DJs, battle rap, freestyle rap, hiphop culture
- Instruments: Vocals, turntables,
- Works: Rock Steady Crew Discogs
- Years active: 1977–present
- Labels: Charisma Records (1984–1986); Virgin (1986–present); Truelements Music (2007)
- Members: Crazy Legs; ♦Current President; ♦Manhattan OG Founder; (Richard Colón); (aka Lil Crazy Legs); 1977–1984; 1984–present; (US); Ynot; ♦Current Sr. VP; (Anthony De Naro); (aka Tony Y-Not); 1991–present; Texas (US); Feenx; ♦Current Jr. VP; 1991–present; (US); JoJo; ♦OG Bronx Co-founder; (Santiago Torres); (aka Joe-Joe); 1977–1984; (US); B-Boy Fresh; ♦Manhattan OG Founder; 1977–1984; (US); Popmaster Fabel; ♦fmr. Sr. VP; 1991–present; (Jorge Pabon); (US); Q-Unique; 1991–present; (Anthony Quiles); (US); Rama Stunt; 1991–present; (US); Ali Dee; (Ali Dee Theodore); (aka Dee); 1991–present; New York City (US); Ray Roll; (Ray Cortez); (aka R. Roll, Roll); 1991–present; (US); Mr. Wiggles; (Steffan Clemente); 1991–present; South Bronx (US); Madchild; (Shane Bunting); 1991–present; (US); Mari; 1991–present; (US); Masami♀; (Masami Kimihara); 1991–present; (US); Fever One; (Carter McGlasson); 1991–present; New York City(US); Mega; 1991–present; (US); DJ Qbert; (Richard Quitevis); 1991–present; (US); Kool DJ Red Alert; (Frederick Crute); (US); Joe Fowler; 1991–present; (US); DJ Presto One; (Murray McMurray); 1991–present; (US); Killa Kela; (Lee Potter); (UK); DJ Cucumber Slice; (Robert Garcia); (aka Bobbito); 1991–present; (US); Jeromeskee; (Jerome Aparis): 1991–present; Seattle (US); Rahzel; (Rozell Manely Brown); 1991–present; (US); DJ Evil Dee; (Ewart Dewgrade); 1991–present; (US); Tony Touch; (Joseph Anthony Hernandez); 1991–present; (US); Russell Peters; (US); KaoticBlaze; (Margie Nuñez); 1991–present; (US); DJ JS-1; (aka JERMZ); 2002–present; 1991–1997; Queens (US); Suga Pop; (Steven Daniells-Silva); 1991–present; (US); D.J.P; (Danny Phillips); 2006–present; Springfield, MO (US); Bönz Malone; 1991–present; The Bronx (US); Al Skratch; (Danny McMillan); 1991–present; (US); Sweepy; (Hernando Molina); 1991–present; (US); Easy Roc; (Jason Geoffrey); (US); Flo Master Fields MC; (Jerry Randolph); (aka Flo Master, Flo, L.A, Legs Almighty); 1991– present; (US); Dizlam; (Isaiah Shaw); 1991– present; (US); Renegade; 1991–present; (US); Richie Rieotch; 1991–present; (US); Rock Steady Straus; 1991–present; (US); Nathan Cade; (female mc); 1991–present; (US); Crazy-A; Tokyo (Japan); Mr. Freeze; (Marc Lemberger); 1977–present; (US); East-3; 1991–present; Hawaii (US); Strategy; (US); SkillRoy; 1991–present; Hawaii (US); BOM 5; (Ray Abrahante); The Bronx(US); Honey Rockwell♀; (Ereina Valencia); 1991–present; Atlanta (US); DOZE; (Jeffrey Green); (aka Devious Doze, Doze Green); 1991–present; 1977–1984; (US); Funky Frank; 1991–present; (US); Rama Pratama; 1991–present; Malang (Indonesia); Bboy BailRok; (Bailey Muñoz); 1991–present; Las Vegas (US); Armani; 1991–present; (US); Abramz; 1991–present; (US); Floor Rock; 1991–present; (US); Ian Eastwood; 2022–present; (US); Club; (Lord TomTom Gaskin); 1991–present; (US); ATS; 1991–present; (US); Case One; 1991–present; (US); Muter; 1991–present; 1977–1984; (US); Quiet Riot; 1991–present; (US); DJ Charlie Rock; (Charlie Jimenez); (aka C Rock, Rock, da diesel); 1991–present; (US); DJ Eclipse; (Eric Winn); 1991–present; Queens (US); DJ DV One; (Toby Campbell)(aka Toby Fresh); 1991–present; Seattle (US); Mania; 1991–present; (US); Skeme Richards; 1991–present; (US); Joe Conzo Jr.; 1991–present; (US); Rakaa Iriescience; (Rakaa Taylor); 1991–present; Los Angeles (US); DStroy; 1991–present; (US); Rich Medin; 1991–present; (US); Leva57♀; (Carmen Claudia Sorbara); 1991–present; (Worldwide); Sab; 1991–present; (US); Shadoe; 1991–present; (US); YOUTEE; 1991–present; (Japan); Unico; 1991–present; (US); Velcro; 1991–present; (US); Tony-Rome; 1991–present; (US); Swoooshh; 1991–present; 1977–1984; (US); Whopa; 1991–present; 1977–1984; (US); Mix Master Mike; (inactive); 1991–present; (US); DJ Apollo; (inactive); 1991–; (US)
- Past members: Jimmy-Dee; ♦OG Bronx Founder; (Jamie White)(aka Price 32, Jimmy D); 1977–1984; (US); Jimmy Lee; ♦OG Bronx Founder; 1977–1984; (US); China Doll♀; ♦Fmr.VP RSC Girls; (Jessica Fuentes); 1977–1984; (US); Ken Swift; (Kenneth James Gabbert); 1977–2012; (US); Rhettmatic; (US); Alien Ness; (Luis Martinez); (US); Micro Mix; (Craig Hunter); (US); Frosty Freeze; (Wayne Frost)(Rip🪦1963-2008); 1979–1984; New York City(US); Easy Mike; 1977–1984; (US); Big Balls; 1977–1984; (US); Baby Love♀; (Daisy Castro); 1977–1984; (US); Buck 4; (Gabriel Marcano)(Rip🪦); 1977–1984; Puerto Rico/New York City(US); Kuriaki; (Lorenzo Soto)(Rip🪦1965-1991); 1978–1984; New York City(US); Kippy Dee; (Sean Christopher Rucker)(aka Rasean)(Rip🪦 1967-1990); 1979–1984; The Bronx(US); P-Body 170th; 1977–1984; (US); Robbie Rob; 1977–1984; (US); Chrome; 1977–1984; (US); Boo-Ble; 1977–1984; (US); True; (Rip🪦1967–2011); 1977–1984; (US); Ty Fly; 1977–1984; (US); Wandee♀; (Wanda Candalerio); (aka WandeePop); 1977–1984; (US); Rockafella♀; (Ana Garcia-Dionisio); (aka ); 1977–1984; (US); Spider Chino; 1977–1984; (US); A1; 1977–1984; (US); Normski; 1977–1984; (US); Rip7; 1977–1984; (US); Pauly; 1977–1984; (US); Lime-5; 1977–1984; (US); Rubberband; 1977–1984; (US); L-Mack; 1977–1984; (US); Doctor Ace; 1977–1984; (US); Slick Rick; 1977–1984; (US); Popeye; 1977–1984; (US); Trace 2; 1977–1984; (US); Trac 2; 1977–1984; (US); Rim 180th; 1977–1984; (US); Tito 183rd; 1977–1984; (US); Toxic; 1977–1984; (US); Ravi; 1977–1984; (US); Me 2; 1977–1984; (US); Green Eye Joe; 1977–1984; (US); Braces; 1977–1984; (US); C.N.; 1977–1984; (US); Les; 1977–1984; (US); Angel Roc; 1977–1984; (US); Bon 5; 1977–1984; (US); Lenny Len; 1977–1984; (US); Lucan Rock; (Rip🪦); 1977–1986; (US); Take One; (Rip🪦); 1977–1984; (US); Johnny J; 1979–1984; (US); JB Fresh; 1979–1984; (US); King Keith; 1979–1984; (US); Fast Feet; (Inactive); 1991–present; (US); The Next One; (Maurizio Cannavò); 1991–; (US); Tuf Tim Twist; 1991-2017; Runcorn (UK); Bgirl Bonita♀; (Bonita Lovett); 1991–2021; Arizona (US); EZMike; (Michael Zurflüh); 2012–2020; (Switzerland); Jazzy Jes♀; (Jessica Rieben); 2012–2020; (Switzerland)

Rock Steady Crew is an American breaking and hip hop group which has become a franchise for multiple groups in other locations. The group's 1983 international hit song "(Hey You) The Rock Steady Crew" (from the group's first studio album Ready for Battle) peaked at No. 6 on the UK Singles Chart, and reached the top 10 in many European countries. Members of Rock Steady Crew featured in the films Flashdance and Beat Street, which ignited international interest in the b-boy subculture.

== History ==
The 1977 original crew was called "Untouchable Four B.Boys". There were 4 members: Joe-Joe, Easy-Mike, Jimmy-Dee, and P.Body 170th.

The larger group known as Rock Steady Crew was initially formed in The Bronx, New York City in 1977 by b-boys Jimmy Dee and Jimmy Lee. The Manhattan branch was created by Crazy Legs and B-Boy Fresh in 1979. The New York Times called the Rock Steady Crew "the foremost breakdancing group in the world today."

== Notable members ==
- DJP
- Crazy Legs
- DJ Cucumber Slice
- DJ Qbert
- Fever One
- Madchild
- Mr. Wiggles
- Q-Unique
- Rahzel
- Tony Touch
- Russell Peters
- East-3
- SkillRoy
- Doze Green
- Buck 4 (Rip)
- Kuriaki (Rip)
- Ian Eastwood

=== Former members ===
- Micro Mix (a.k.a. Craig Hunter)
- Frosty Freeze
- Mix Master Mike
- Ken Swift
- Rhettmatic
- Daisy Castro (a.k.a. Baby Love) – lead vocals on "(Hey You) The Rock Steady Crew"

== Early Music Dealings ==
In the early part of the 1980s Rock Steady Crew's talent manager was Kool Lady Blue, also known as Ruza Blue, founder of Club Negril & Roxy NYC.

If you claim to be hip-hop, you better pay attention! Please read the interview with Kool Lady Blue. Kool Lady Blue is my first manager, and she is also the first person to establish a hip-hop residency in the downtown scene. The names and places are legendary. The story of how this all came about should be mandatory reading for anyone who would like to learn about how hip-hop culture made it to the downtown scene and throughout the rest of the world..please share your thoughts on what you learn on this post. #hiphop #rocksteadycrew #davidbowie #hiphophistory #knowledge

— Crazy Legs, current President, OG founder of the Manhattan branch of Rock Steady Crew

August 08, 2024

== Discography ==
=== Albums ===
- Ready for Battle (Virgin Records, 1984)
- 30 Years to the Day (Truelements Music, 2007)

=== Singles ===
Year	Song	UK	Certifications
1983	"(Hey You) The Rock Steady Crew"	6	BPI: Silver
1984	"Uprock"	64	
1984	"She's Fresh"	—	
2000	"Used to Wish I Could Break with Rock Steady"	—	
"—" denotes releases that did not chart.

== Appearances in feature films ==
- Wild Style (1982)
- Style Wars (1983)
- Flashdance (1983)
- Beat Street (1984)
- Moonwalker (1988)
- Streets Is Watching (1998)

== Awards and accolades ==
In 1992, Gregory Hines was the 1st to stand & clap at the mention of Rock Steady Crew's "So, What Happens Now?" the musical, soon the audience at the Kennedy Center Honors joined him. President George Bush, Gregory Peck and the Nicholas Brothers were all in attendance.

Rock Steady Crew were the first B-boys to perform at Carnegie Hall on Jan 19, 2001.

Mayor Michael R. Bloomberg in 2003, proclaimed July 26 to be "Rock Steady Crew Day" in New York City during Rock Steady Crew's 26th Anniversary Celebration at Pier 54.

Crazy Legs signed a deal with Fila Sportswear in 2004, the first B-boy to get a sneaker company to honor their crew; Rock Steady Crew got its own sneaker – the "Rock Steady Crew 77".

Also in 2004 Mr. Freeze accepted the Rock Steady Crew's Key to the City of Las Vegas on February 21, and it was proclaimed that day to be "Rock Steady Crew Day" in Las Vegas. It happens annually.

Rock Steady Crew was an honoree at the 2004 VH1 Hip Hop Honors Event.

In 2008 The Borough president of The Bronx presented Rock Steady Crew with a Citation of Merit.

== Books ==
- Richard "Crazy Legs" Colón (2026). Rock Steady for Life: Bringing Breakdancing to the World. Rizzoli. ISBN 978-0-8478-7708-9.

== Sources ==
- The Freshest Kids: A History of the B-Boy (DVD), Image Entertainment, 2002.
- Hip-Hop (Korean Comic) (Manhwa), IQ Jump Comics, 1998–2004.
