= Ken Swift =

Puerto Rican breakdancer

- Born: Kenneth James Gabbert
- Known for: B-boying
- Movement: Hip hop

Kenneth James Gabbert (born August 13, 1966), better known by his stage name Ken Swift, is a second generation b-boy, or breakdancer. He was a longtime member and key figure in the Rock Steady Crew, and its former Vice President. He is now President of the Breaklife and VII Gems Hip Hop movement in New York City. Ken Swift began b-boying in 1978, at the age of twelve, when he was inspired by dancers on the Upper West Side of Manhattan. Widely known in the Breaking world as "the Epitome of a B-Boy," he is widely considered by b-boys to be the individual who has had the greatest influence on breakdancing. Ken Swift is credited with the creation of many dance moves and terminology. His original footwork and "freeze style" became a foundational part of breaking, which were considered new concepts at the time.

Ken Swift has several film credits to his name, including Style Wars, the first hip hop documentary, and the first hip hop major motion picture, Wild Style. His most famous movie was 1983's hit Flashdance, where his two-minute dance with several members of the Rock Steady Crew launched the hip hop scene into international attention. Ken Swift also danced in the motion picture Beat Street. He has since appeared on numerous music videos and documentary films on hip hop and breaking.

== History ==
As a b-boy, Ken's original stage name was "Ken Rok". He used several other pseudonyms, including "Kid Zoom", "Ken Ski", and "Prince Ken Swift", before ultimately settling upon "Ken Swift". He started the Young City Boys in 1978 which included Doze Green, Dante, Deno Rock, Andy, Stevie D, and Disco C among many others. YCB member Ty Fly introduced Ken to Frosty Freeze from Rock City Crew in 1979 and in 1980 they decided together to join the Rock Steady Crew as co-Vice Presidents. The world renowned Rock Steady Crew (RSC) was the first group of b-boys to receive professional recognition from the media and their peers. The Village Voice published the article "Breaking is Hard To Do," that included Ken and RSC which influenced a greater audience to garner an interest in hip hop and b-boying. Along with several other members of RSC, Ken Swift performed regularly in local clubs at events such as Negril, Danceteria, the Kitchen, Studio 54 and the Roxy, and he participated in the world's very first International Hip Hop tour "New York City Rap". They also appeared in television and film including Style Wars (1982), Wild Style (1982), Flashdance (1983,) The David Letterman Show (1983), and Beat Street (1982).

As a recording artist with RSC Ken received gold and silver records for the single "Hey You, The Rock Steady Crew." (Virgin/Charisma, 1984) The album, Ready for Battle, which included two dance videos, reached out to a larger pop audience worldwide, brought about tours to Europe and Asia, bringing breaking to a world audience for the first time.

In 1996 Ken co-authored, co-directed, co-choreographed and performed Off-Broadway's first hip hop musical Jam On The Groove. One hundred performances led to a Drama Desk Award nomination for Best Choreography in the 1995–1996 seasons. For these achievements, Ken and Ghettoriginal Productions Dance Company received a Bessie Award for choreography. In 1999, hip hop Culture was inducted into the Rock & Roll Hall of Fame and Museum for which Ken was asked to produce an installation.

In August 1996, Ken Swift was on the cover of Rap Pages, making him the first b-boy ever to be on the cover of a major hip hop publication. The popular article, "Past, Present, Future: Ken Swift The Quintessential B-Boy" portrayed Ken Swift as a pioneer of b-boying and reaffirmed him as a fundamental figure in the hip hop community. In 1999 as part of the hip hop induction into the Rock and Roll Hall of Fame, Ken choreographed and performed in a world premiere dance piece for the ceremony entitled "Super Disco Breaks." Ken became a member of the 1999 U.S. Team "1st Platoon," which took first place out of six other countries in a dance competition known as "The Korea World Cup".

In 1996 Ken started a dance company called VII Gems, a company dedicated to the preservation of New York City's traditional dances, Breaking and Rocking. He directed and choreographed the first ever Rock Dance theater piece entitled "Rockin It" that toured 8 cities throughout the UK in May 2009 sponsored by the Breaking Convention, a Sadler Wells Project. The company is still active and consists of members whom average over 30 years of dance experience, authentic pioneer dancers from the early years of these dances. The company is involved in numerous dance classes, lectures, demonstrations, performances, panels, film screenings, competitions, and workshops throughout the world.

At a local Manhattan elementary school, P.S. 84, with a grant from the New York Historical Society, Ken organized a course for 7–11 year olds entitled "The History of Hip Hop Culture in New York: Focusing on Dance" in 2001 and in 2008 directed and wrote curriculum for BEAT BREAKERS, a non-profit organization that teaches Breaking Fundamentals in after school programs at multiple schools in The Bronx, NY. In 2004, Ken founded "The Ken Swift School of Hip Hop Fundamentals" at Breaklife Studios in Brooklyn, New York, to allow for an environment for others to learn the art and history of Hip Hop.

== Present day ==
As of today, Ken Swift is heralded as one of the greatest influences on hip hop culture, and a legend in the b-boying community. He travels regularly as a dance competition judge and conducts workshops. He has participated in and judged dance competitions throughout the world in countries such as France, Switzerland, Sweden, China, South Africa, Finland, Italy, the Netherlands, Portugal, Spain, Brazil, Venezuela, Norway, Germany, Canada, Japan, Belgium, Russia, Portugal, Australia, New Zealand, the United Kingdom and the throughout the U.S. Ken was a Scholar in Residence at New York University's Hip Hop Education Center from 2014 to 2015. He was appointed as an Eminent Artist in the Dance Department at University of California Riverside for the Spring of 2016 and Spring of 2017. Currently he is a professor of dance studies at UCLA since 2018 and is completing his first book entitled, The Art of Breaking. He is also a contributor to The Oxford Handbook of Hip Hop Dance Studies, which was published in December 2022.

== Influence and legacy ==
During the period in which hip hop and breaking were gaining national attention, Ken's original footwork and overall style became an integral part of b-boying and is recognized as a blueprint for the dance. As a dancer, he continues to innovate and improve upon original foundation moves; though his style was viewed as "new school" in the past, today, it is considered fundamental for breaking.

== Awards ==
In 1996 Ken and Ghettoriginal Productions Dance Company received a Bessie Award for choreography as well as Drama Desk Award nominations for Best Choreography in the 1995–1996 seasons.

Ken received the Louis Reyes Rivera Lifetime Achievement Award presented to him at Amherst College in 1993 and a Lifetime Achievement Award from The Mighty IV, a nationally renowned annual Breaking event in North California in 2004. In 2007, Ken received an Appreciation Award from Seoul Arts College as well as a Hall of Fame Living Legend Award from the Korean Tourism Agency, which declared him as an Honorary Ambassador of Korea and positive influence on youth cultures worldwide. In 2009, Ken was awarded a Zulu Nation Achievement Award at the "Take 1" event in Belgium, as well as an Appreciation Award from Encountras las Ruas at the Joinville Dance Festival in Brazil. Kens' travels brought him back to the United States in 2010. While judging at "The Ultimate Bboy Championship" in Las Vegas, Ken was presented with a Lifetime Achievement Award for his preservation and dedication to b-boy culture.

Also in 2010, Ken was acknowledged as an "American Master" by the National Endowment for the Art's and received an American Masterpieces in Dance Award to reconstruct his choreography with olive Dance Theatre in a show entitled "Swift Solos: The Re-Construction of Ken Swift's 20th Century Breakin'", which toured 5 cities in the United States throughout 2010. In 2011, Ken Swift was voted the 2nd Most Influential Dancer of the 20th Century by CNN's Icon Series; he was the only b-boy to receive this honor, which otherwise was primarily given to ballet dancers. In France in 2012, Afrika Bambaataa along with Le CACDU and Zulu Nation France, honored Ken with an Ambassador of Hip Hop Culture award on the 30th Anniversary of Hip Hop Culture. In June 2013, as part of Sadler Wells' "Breaking Convention Festival" at NY's Apollo Theater, Ken was honored for his contributions to the dance of Breaking which included an exclusive short dance piece entitled "Chill Town, New York". In 2014, Ken received an Award of Honor from Style Elements crew in San Francisco, an Award of Honor from Batalla de Fuego in Columbia, and an Award of Recognition from Cultural Corporation of San Pedro in Chile. In 2015, Ken received a Living Legend of Hip Hop Award from Hip Hop International at the World Championships in San Diego.

== Films ==
- Flashdance, Paramount Pictures
- Beat Street, Orion Pictures
- Wild Style, Charlie Ahearn
- Style Wars, Tony Silva/Henry Chalfant
- The Freshest Kids (Breakdance BBoy Breakin Hip Hop)
- Planet B-Boy, Benson Lee

== Television ==
- N.Y Edition Marc Wahlberg Show, NBC
- Good Morning America, ABC
- Late Night with David Letterman 1983
- The Grind, MTV
- Club Concert, PBS
- September Songs:The Music of Kurt Weill & Ghettoriginal, PBS
