= Beat Street =

1984 American drama dance film

- Theatrical release poster
- Directed by: Stan Lathan
- Written by: Andrew Davis; David Gilbert; Paul Golding; Steven Hager
- Story by: Richard Lee Sisco
- Produced by: Harry Belafonte; David V. Picker
- Starring: Rae Dawn Chong; Guy Davis; Jon Chardiet; Leon W. Grant; Saundra Santiago; Robert Taylor; Lee Chamberlin; Mary Alice; Shawn Elliot; Jim Borrelli; Dean Elliott; Franc. Reyes
- Cinematography: Tom Priestley Jr.
- Edited by: Dov Hoenig; Kevin Lee
- Music by: Arthur Baker
- Production company: Orion Pictures
- Distributed by: Orion Pictures
- Release date: June 8, 1984
- Running time: 105 minutes
- Country: United States
- Language: English
- Budget: $9.5 million
- Box office: $16.6 million

Beat Street is a 1984 American dance drama film featuring New York City hip hop culture of the early 1980s. Set in the South Bronx, the film follows the lives of a pair of brothers and their group of friends, all of whom are devoted to various elements of early hip hop culture, including breakdancing, DJing and graffiti.

== Plot ==
In the South Bronx, New York City, budding disc jockey and MC Kenny "Double K" Kirkland is hired as a featured DJ at a house party at an abandoned building, accompanied by his best friend Ramon Franco, a graffiti artist known by his tag "Ramo", and his friend/manager Chollie Wilson. Kenny's younger brother Lee crashes the party with his dance crew the Beat Street Breakers, who begin sparring with rival crew the Bronx Rockers. Although, the fight is quickly broken up by Henri, a recently discharged army veteran who's been squatting in the building's basement. The next day, Chollie informs Kenny of complimentary tickets to The Roxy, one of Manhattan's most popular nightclubs. Meanwhile, Ramon's father, Domingo, implores his son to get a job and marry Carmen Carraro, the young mother of his illegitimate baby.

While visiting The Roxy a few nights later, Kenny meets composer Tracy Carlson. During an ensuing breakdance battle between the Breakers and Bronx Rockers, Tracy notices Lee's performance, inviting him to audition for a dancing television show. Lee, Kenny and their crew visit a dance rehearsal at the City College of New York (CCNY), where she is contributing a dance composition to a television program, and Lee performs only to be rejected. Kenny accuses Tracy of being condescending towards Lee.

Later, Ramon visits with Carmen and their baby. After her mother accuses him of shirking his responsibility, Carmen begs him to take them away. Meanwhile, Tracy visits the Kirklands' apartment to apologize. She and Kenny bond over some of his musical mixes that he plays for her. Later, the pair visits the subway tunnels, where Ramon and Lee are spray-painting a wall. Ramon longingly watches a clean, white train pass, claiming it his dream canvas. Startled by rival graffiti artist Spit, a shadowy and taciturn hooded street punk who has been defacing Ramon's artwork and is tagging a freshly painted wall, the group departs.

Walking Tracy home, Kenny explains the death of his older brother Franklin, a gang member. The next day, Chollie invites him to play at the Burning Spear club, run by DJ Kool Herc. Accompanied by Tracy, Kenny impresses the crowd with his skills, and Kool Herc hires him to perform at the establishment the following weekend. The next day, Ramon asks Domingo if Carmen can live with them. Domingo declines, insisting that he marry Carmen and provide for his child.

Later, Chollie takes Kenny to the Roxy, where a talent scout is auditioning local performers, and invites the scout to see Kenny deejay at the Burning Spear. Afterward, Kenny visits CCNY to surprise Tracy and sees her intimately embracing her professor, Robert. Ramon tells his friends he plans to move Carmen and the baby into a vacant apartment upstairs, and eventually obtains employment at a hardware store. His friends help him furnish the apartment, surprising Carmen with a small housewarming party.

On Saturday night at the Burning Spear, Kenny impresses the talent scout, who invites him to perform at the Roxy on New Year's Eve. Meanwhile, Tracy permits Kenny to use the college's computerized studio, while she assists Robert at a nearby piano. Kenny accidentally deletes his work, and rejects Robert and Tracy's attempts to help him, telling her their relationship might not last.

Waiting for a train with Ramon, Kenny worries that he potentially offended Tracy, while Ramon laments that his job limits his opportunities to perfect and showcase his artistry. Suddenly, he notices an all-white train on the "A" line, deciding to paint it that night after work. Later that evening, Kenny helps Ramon paint the train, but Spit, lurking nearby, tags the train even before Ramon can complete the other side. In the ensuing scuffle in the subway tunnels, Spit sprays paint in Ramon's eyes and both tussle on the roadbed before rolling onto the electrified third rail, which fatally electrocutes both instantly.

After Ramon's funeral, Kenny contemplates forgoing the Roxy's New Year's Eve show, but Tracy and Chollie dissuade him. Kenny ultimately uses his big break to celebrate Ramon's life, starting with a rap performance while images of Ramon and his work appear on a screen behind him, impressing Domingo. Grandmaster Melle Mel & the Furious Five assist him along with a Bronx gospel choir, backed by the City College Dancers and a group of twenty-five breakdancers.

== Cast ==
- Rae Dawn Chong as Tracy Carlson
- Guy Davis as Kenny "Double K" Kirkland
- Jon Chardiet as Ramon "Ramo" Franco
- Leon W. Grant as Chollie Wilson
- Saundra Santiago as Carmen Carraro
- Robert Taylor as Lee Kirkland
- Mary Alice as Cora Kirkland
- Shawn Elliott as Domingo
- Bill Anagnos as "Spit"
- Jim Borelli as Monte
- Dean Elliot as Henri
- Jason Lopez as MERIT
- Tonya Pinkins as Angela
- Lee Chamberlin as Alicia
- Duane Jones as Robert
- Erik Abbey as B-Boy Supreme
- Afrika Bambaataa as Himself
- Soulsonic Force as Themselves
- Jazzy Jay as Himself
- Doug E. Fresh as Himself
- Bernard Fowler as Himself
- New York City Breakers as Beat Street Breakers
- Tony Lopez as Pex
- Rock Steady Crew as Bronx Rockers
- Kuriaki as Bronx Rocker
- Devious Doze as Bronx Rocker
- Crazy Legs as Bronx Rocker
- Prince Ken Swift as Bronx Rocker
- Buck Four as Bronx Rocker
- Baby Love as Bronx Rocker
- Clive "Kool Herc" Campbell as Himself
- Treacherous Three as Themselves
- Grandmaster Melle Mel & the Furious Five as Themselves
- Wanda Dee as Herself
- Brenda K. Starr as Herself
- The System as Themselves

Kadeem Hardison was credited as "High School Student" in the director's cut of the film. However, his scenes were all cut from the final theatrical version.

== Background ==
The movie was inspired by an original story, "The Perfect Beat", by journalist Steven Hager, who sold the idea to producer Harry Belafonte. Only a few character names from Hager's story made it into the final film. The 1983 film Wild Style was an obvious inspiration and model, in terms of story, style, characters, and themes. In addition, some of the plotline of the film was based on the New York City graffiti documentary, Style Wars, also released in 1983. Most visibly, the antagonist, Spit, in Beat Street was lifted from the real-life graffiti artist CAP MPC, who was portrayed in Style Wars.

== Filming locations ==
Beat Street was filmed in New York City in December 1983, in the boroughs of The Bronx, Manhattan, Brooklyn and Queens. Several scenes were shot inside the city's subway system, both onboard trains and in stations, notably Hoyt-Schermerhorn Streets, 57th Street-Sixth Avenue and Fresh Pond Road. Scenes were also filmed on the campus of the City College of New York, which includes the concert venue Aaron Davis Hall. Many of the internal dance sequences were filmed at the popular night club, the Roxy, located in the Chelsea section of Manhattan.

== Musical performances and soundtrack ==
There are several performances in the movie, notably from established early hip hop groups, Grandmaster Melle Mel & the Furious Five, Doug E. Fresh, Afrika Bambaataa & Soulsonic Force and the Treacherous Three. As a member of the Treacherous Three, Kool Moe Dee also appeared in the film.

The musical performance of Kool Moe Dee stands as one of the few media appearances he has ever made without his trademark sunglasses (a style he had not yet adopted at the time). In addition to these acts, Guy Davis, who played Kenny, is also a blues musician in real life.

Three female MCs appear in a party scene in Beat Street: Debbie D, Sha-Rock and Lisa Lee. They perform a limited and limiting performance as a group called "Us Girls" (see video). The first lyrics you hear are sung (vs. rapped). This moment tends to diminish the significance of women in early hip hop performance as if by 1984 female emcees were already exceptional to a musical genre that was still emerging and developing. The group sings in unison, "Us Girls / Can Boogie, too," then each emcee performs a short rhyme.

The film also includes other musical performances from Tina B and The System, both of whom appear on the soundtrack album. Though not featured on the album, there were also appearances by rapper Richard Lee Sisco and singers Bernard Fowler and Brenda K. Starr, known as the Queen of freestyle who later became a Latin artist.

At least three breakdancing battles between the New York City Breakers and the Rock Steady Crew were also included in the film. In addition, the Roxy audition scene features a pair of breakdancing boys known as the Fantastic Duo.

This was the first American film to feature more than one soundtrack album. Originally, Atlantic Records, which released the soundtrack albums, had three volumes planned, but only two of these were released. The second volume was never released on compact disc.

The trailer includes an alternate version of the title song performed by Kool Moe Dee, a version that was not featured in the movie or on the original soundtrack albums.

== Reception ==
Beat Street was screened out of competition at the 1984 Cannes Film Festival. It received mixed critical reviews and the film holds a 57% rating on Rotten Tomatoes based on seven reviews. Metacritic gave it a score of 68 out of 100, indicating "generally favorable" reviews.

Vincent Canby of The New York Times gave it a mixed review, concluding that " the film itself is best understood as a trailer for the soundtrack album".

== Legacy ==
Beat Street's impact was felt internationally as well as throughout the United States. In Germany, for example, movies such as Beat Street and Wild Style are credited with introducing the hip hop movement to the country. Because movies are so easily distributed over borders, part of the importance of this movie lay in its ability to influence both East Germany and West Germany, which at the time were still divided. Beat Street was of particular importance in socialist East Germany, since its release was intended to illustrate the evils of capitalism (poverty, racial segregation) for young audiences. However, because the film focused so heavily on the visual aspects of hip-hop culture, such as breaking and graffiti, these aspects were far more influential and inspired an emerging German hip-hop scene.

It was precisely these visual aspects that helped bring hip-hop culture to Germany, rather than simply a genre of music. Beat Street appeared in the German Democratic Republic at almost the same time as in the West. Dresden, the center of the Beat Street scene was geographically out of western media range, making it a perfect center to explore this genre of music. The hip hop scene for the entire public would meet at breakdancing competitions, emceeing competitions, and graffiti spraying. Puerto Rican and African American breakdancing, hip hop and Latin freestyle dance sounds, and inner-city American graffiti made up what Germans knew as hip hop culture. The aftermath of Beat Street propelled events such as competitions in emceeing, break dancing, and graffiti spraying throughout Germany.

== In popular culture ==
- AZ mentions the film in his song "The Come Up", in the line "Before Beat Street, streets was heavily in deep with the ryders."
- The Notorious B.I.G. in his song "Suicidal Thoughts" said, "Should I die on the train tracks like Ramo in Beat Street/People at my funeral frontin' like they miss me."
- Jay Electronica mentions the film in his song "Exhibit A (Transformations)" in the line "Who gone bring the game back/who gone spit that Ramo on the train tracks".
- Ras Kass in his song "Won't Catch Me Runnin'" said, "When my voice hits the mic, I electrocute Spit like Beat Street."
- Nas mentioned the song 'Doo Rags' from his in his highly acclaimed album - 'The Lost Tapes'
- Mr. Lif, on "Elektro", rapped the lines: "So I use the same flow to put niggas under in The Serpent and the Rainbow/Go back to Beat Street and resurrect Ramo knock the shit out of Spit verbal eclipse"
- In The Proud Family Movie, Oscar offhandedly mentions Beat Street.
- In 2022, author Steven Hager published the inside story of what went wrong with the film.

== See also ==
- Breakin'
- Breakin' 2: Electric Boogaloo
- Krush Groove
- Rappin'
- Style Wars
- Wild Style
- List of hood films
