= Emmett Kelly Jr. =

American clown (1924–2006)

- Born: Emmett Leo Kelly Jr. November 13, 1924; Dyersburg, Tennessee, US
- Died: November 29, 2006 (aged 82); Sierra Vista, Arizona, US
- Resting place: Southern Arizona Veterans Memorial Cemetery
- Other name: Weary Willie
- Occupation: Circus Clown
- Spouse: Dorothy Mae Coffee (1928–1989)
- Children: 5
- Parent(s): Emmett Kelly (1898–1979); Eva Mae Moore Lewis (1903–1991)

Emmett Leo Kelly Jr. (November 13, 1924 – November 29, 2006) was an American clown. He was the son of Emmett Kelly Sr., who was a legendary circus clown. Kelly Jr. copied his father's style.

== Early life ==
Kelly was born in Dyersburg, Tennessee on the day the John Robinson Circus, his father's employer, was doing its last show. Kelly Jr. spent his first few years traveling with his parents. When he reached school age he still traveled with his family during the summer and lived with his grandparents when school was in session. He finished school during World War II, and joined the Navy at age 18 and spent approximately three years in the Pacific participating in major operations in Iwo Jima and Okinawa. Despite being raised around the circus, he pursued a career in the railroad business after the war, becoming a switch tender and also a mechanic.

== Career ==
In 1960, Kelly Jr., who had never been encouraged by his father, appeared as his father's character "Weary Willie" at the Circus Festival in Peru, Indiana. He was represented by their manager, Leonard Green, for the next four years. He toured a daredevil auto show called "Austin's Motor Derby" during the night and would arrive just hours before the next show. In 1963, Kelly was the featured performer of the Hagen-Wallace Circus as they traveled nationwide. The elder Kelly was not happy with his son's decision to play an almost identical character, although the latter claimed his version of Weary Willie was less sad, and the two were estranged for years.

While traveling to a Kodak performance in San Diego, California, Kelly drove to Tombstone, Arizona on a sightseeing detour. He said he had four days to get to San Diego and he was well ahead of schedule so he wanted to see Tombstone. He fell in love with the town and decided to retire there. Kelly would snowbird each year in Tombstone until he moved there in 1980. It was then that he joined the Arizona Rangers and the Tombstone Company.

In 1972, Kelly, with help from his manager, established his own circus which toured nationally and was the only circus to perform at the White House, not just once but twice—once in 1972 and again in 1973 during the annual White House Easter Egg Roll. Throughout his life, Kelly donated his time to several charities including The Make A Wish Foundation, The American Cancer Society, Save The Children Foundation, and FACES—The National Association for the Craniofacially Handicapped and was honored by Presidents, First Ladies, Kings and Queens, and numerous heads of state. A weekend event in Tombstone, Arizona was named after him. Emmett Kelly Jr. Days, which is held in November, includes clown school and other events. It is done to raise funds for a scholarship for a Tombstone High School graduate. Kelly continued to perform until he retired from clowning on his 81st birthday in 2004.

On his last birthday he requested to retrieve his Ranger Badge. He died 16 days later. The badge was presented to his daughter by LTC Lathan Varnado, State Adjutant. In a gold framed case, Mrs. Kelly-Knapp was presented an Arizona Ranger Patch flanked on the left by a Ranger Badge and a Ranger Belt Buckle on the right. Also lying on the field of blue felt was a plaque inscribed "Emmett Kelly Jr., Arizona Rangers, Tombstone Company, 1982, Badge # 405."

Since he worked for the railroad, Kelly's hobbies outside of the circus included collecting model trains which later inspired him to create the Emmett Kelly Jr. Circus Train collection. He was also a race car enthusiast.

== Personal life ==
After his discharge from the military, he married and raised five children. He worked at a variety of jobs, in various locations, before settling down in Peru, Ind. He worked as a brakeman with the Chesapeake & Ohio Railroad, struggling on $134 every two weeks.

Kelly continued touring, despite his wife's pleas. Their marriage eventually ended in a divorce in the '60s. His wife said that his character Willie had taken over her husband. Not long after he went on the road with Willie, his son, Paul Anthony Kelly, lost an arm in a train accident. Kelly Jr. heard of the accident and came home, but after a brief visit departed, saying "Willie’s got itchy feet."

He married his second wife, Nancy Jean Hanns of Hartford City, Indiana, on July 10, 1978, while in Philadelphia. They exchanged their vows while both were seated on the back of an elephant. Nancy later became the ringmaster for Emmett's one-ring circus.

== Death ==
Kelly died November 29, 2006, in Sierra Vista, Arizona at the Sierra Vista Regional Health Center which is near his home in Tombstone, Arizona. His family, friends, and The Arizona Rangers were at his bedside when he died. He was 82. A US Navy veteran of World War II, Kelly was interred at the Southern Arizona Veterans' Memorial Cemetery in Sierra Vista, Cochise County, Arizona.

== Legacy ==
In 2023, the strained relationship that Emmett Kelly, Jr. had with his father, Emmett Kelly, was the subject of the award-winning short documentary Who Is Weary Willie? directed by Constanza H. Hevia and produced by filmmaker and scholar Daniel L. Bernardi.
