= Wind Across the Everglades =

1958 film by Nicholas Ray

- Directed by: Nicholas Ray
- Written by: Budd Schulberg
- Produced by: Stuart Schulberg
- Starring: Burl Ives; Christopher Plummer; Gypsy Rose Lee; Chana Eden; Mackinlay Kantor; Emmett Kelly
- Cinematography: Joseph C. Brun
- Edited by: Georges Klotz; Joseph Zigman
- Music by: Paul Sawtell; Bert Shefter
- Distributed by: Warner Bros. Pictures
- Release date: September 11, 1958
- Running time: 93 minutes
- Country: United States
- Language: English

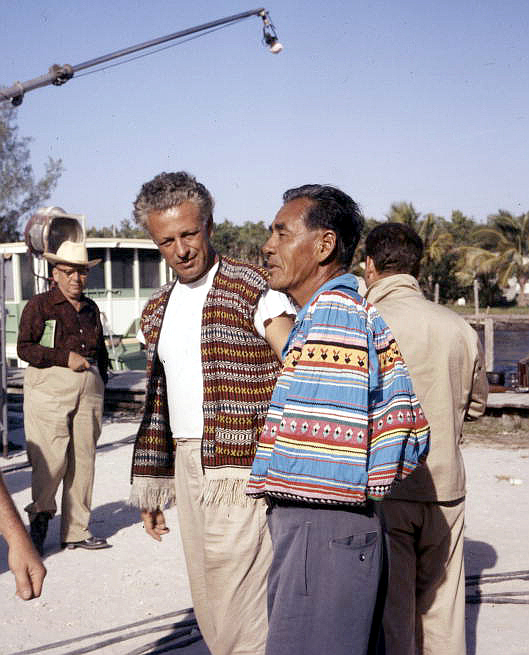
Director Nicholas Ray (left) with actor Cory Osceola during filming of Wind Across the Everglades

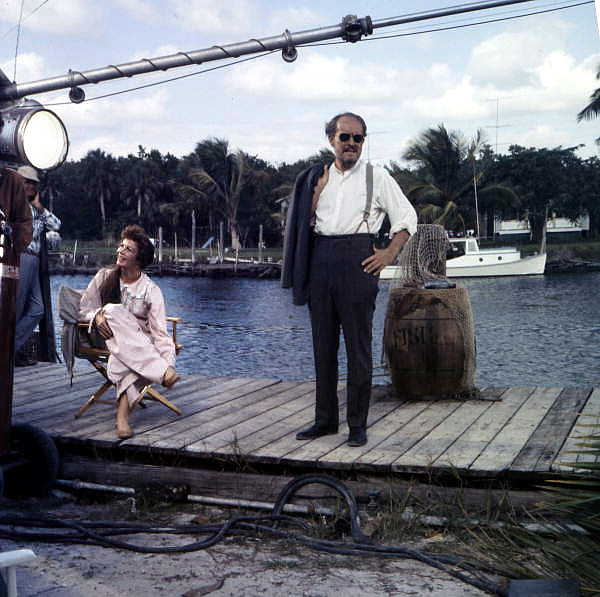
Chana Eden and Emmett Kelly on set

Wind Across the Everglades is a 1958 American drama film directed by Nicholas Ray. Ray was fired from the film before production was finished, and several scenes were completed by screenwriter Budd Schulberg, who also supervised the editing. Chris Fujiwara wrote on Turner Classic Movies that the film is "an acid test for auteurists, one of those special films that, while ignored or despised for the most part, are cherished and fiercely defended by those who love great American directors."

The film stars Burl Ives, features Christopher Plummer in his first lead role (and his second film role overall) and introduces Chana Eden, who plays the leading lady, and a young Peter Falk, who plays a minor role. Former stripper Gypsy Rose Lee and circus clown Emmett Kelly also are among those in an unusual cast.

It was filmed on location in Everglades National Park in Technicolor.

== Plot ==
In the early 20th century, rare birds across the Florida Everglades are killed by plume hunters, making the population an endangered species. In response, the Audubon Society appoints volunteers as game wardens to enforce conservation laws. Despite their efforts, two wardens are killed near Miami. Walt Murdock, a nature conservationist, arrives in town to teach nature studies at a local high school. Nearby a train, Murdock removes a plume from a wealthy matron's lavish hat, and argues unapologetically with her husband George Leggett. Murdock is arrested, but his sentence is commuted to service as a game warden.

During his first canoe trip across the Everglades, Murdock encounters Cottonmouth, the leader of a gang of bird poachers. Openly defiant of conservation laws, Cottonmouth and his men shoot at the birds near their nesting grounds. Murdock returns from his canoe trip and describes the beauty of nature he has witnessed to Aaron Nathanson, an immigrant storekeeper, and his daughter Naomi. Meanwhile, Cottonmouth is told by Perfesser, one of his men, that Murdock is not a pushover. Regardless, Cottonmouth instigates a scheme to have Murdock killed. Beef, another member of Cottonmouth's gang, meets and connects Murdock with Billy One-Arm, a native Seminole who tours Murdock through the swamp.

Billy One-Arm has been instructed to leave Murdock for dead, but Murdock wakes up during the night and finds him. Billy admires Murdock's inherent goodness and intervenes when Murdock attempts to touch a deadly manchineel tree sap. By the next morning, Cottonmouth suspects Billy has disobeyed orders. Billy instructs Murdock to flee and is brought before Cottonmouth, who sentences Billy to be poisoned by manchineel for his betrayal. Murdock finds Billy's corpse in the swamp, whereby Billy's wife takes Murdock home to be nursed back to health.

During the Fourth of July celebration, Murdock and Naomi have fallen in love. Later that day, Beef arrives on shore lying on a mattress, claiming he is suffering from a stiff neck. Suspicious of Beef, Murdock finds the mattress is filled with plume feathers. He marches into a commissionary meeting and accuses Leggett of accepting bribes to have plumage smuggled into town. Murdock's charges against Leggett are ignored, but nevertheless an arrest warrant for Cottonmouth is issued. Embittered, Murdock decides to quit but decides to travel to the swamp to arrest Cottonmouth.

During a night storm, Cottonmouth takes Murdock into his camp quarters and treats Murdock with hospitality to his liquor. There, Murdock and Cottonmouth exchange philosophical differences on their views of nature. Cottonmouth believes that as in nature, it's "eat or 'et" while Murdock stresses Cottonmouth's greed is impacting the ecosystem. Before long, Murdock partakes in the revelry with Cottonmouth and his men. The next morning, Murdock wakes up from a hangover and is challenged by Cottonmouth to take him into town alive without help so Cottonmouth can face his charges.

Deep in the swamplands, Murdock becomes exhausted and almost shoots Cottonmouth. Although they are lost, they stop to admire the beauty of the swamp. Cottonmouth reaches for his hat in the water, and is bitten by a cottonmouth snake. Resisting Murdock's plea to administer aid, Cottonmouth accepts his fate, as he wants to die from natural causes. As Cottonmouth calls for the swamp to take him, Murdock sails away.

== Cast ==
- Burl Ives as Cottonmouth
- Christopher Plummer as Walt Murdock
- Gypsy Rose Lee as Mrs. Bradford
- George Voskovec as Aaron Nathanson
- Tony Galento as Beef
- Howard I. Smith as George Liggett
- Emmett Kelly as Bigamy Bob
- Pat Henning as Sawdust
- Chana Eden as Naomi Nathanson
- Curt Conway as Perfessor
- Peter Falk as Writer
- Fred Grossinger as Slowboy
- Sammy Renick as Loser
- Toch Brown as One-note
- Frank Rothe as Howard Ross Morgan
- MacKinlay Kantor as Judge Harris
- Cory Osceola as Billy One-Arm

== Critical reputation ==
Due to Ray's having been fired from the production before the film was completed, Wind Across the Everglades holds a contentious place in film scholarship. In a short review of the film, critic Jonathan Rosenbaum described it as "a kind of litmus test for auteurists". After citing the film's editorial history, Rosenbaum goes on to say that "Ray's masterful use of color and mystical sense of equality between the antagonists (also evident in Rebel Without a Cause and Bitter Victory) are made all the more piquant here by his feeling for folklore and outlaw ethics as well as his cadenced mise en scene." While it was praised for its ahead-of-its-time ecological themes and authentic and unusual scenery, the film still suffered from "editorial hacking and post-production cheapness" leading to an overall effect of "one of those production disasters that bleeds brilliance in all directions."

== See also ==
- List of American films of 1958
