= Francis Beverly Kelley =

American author and press agent

Francis Beverly "Bev" Kelley (1905–1984) was an American author and press agent who worked with several circuses over his lifetime, including Ringling Bros. and Barnum & Bailey. He was married to Elizabeth Ruth Stevens. One of his earliest publications was The Land of Sawdust and Spangles -- a World in Miniature, published by National Geographic. He attended Ohio Wesleyan University, later becoming a trustee to that same school.

== Career ==
Over his lifetime, he published several pieces of writing, including the biography of the world's first sad clown, Emmet Kelly. He published both books and magazine articles, notably in National Geographic. In addition to working with circuses, he worked with Broadway, doing advance work for multiple travelling shows. He worked as publicity director for the National Foundation for Infantile Paralysis from 1942 to 1945. A most memorable pitchman stunt, he was hired to obtain several white circus horses and a calliope for President Harry S Truman's inauguration parade.

== Personal life ==
Kelley was born in Delaware, Ohio. He married Elizabeth Ruth Stevens on June 20th, 1930. In a 1980 interview, he said Fiddler on the Roof was his favorite musical.

He died of pneumonia on April 3, 1984, at the age of 78.
