= Bill Anagnos =

American stuntman and actor (1958–2019)

- Born: August 19, 1958; Rhinebeck, New York, U.S.
- Died: January 15, 2019 (aged 60); Red Hook, New York, U.S.
- Occupations: Stuntman, actor
- Years active: 1977–2019

William G. Anagnos (August 19, 1958 – January 15, 2019) was an American stuntman and actor.

== Filmography ==
Actor

Year	Title	Role	Notes
1979	The Warriors	Baseball Fury #11	
1980	Can't Stop the Music	Moped Rider	
1981	Rollover	Crowd Member	Uncredited
1982	A Stranger Is Watching	Hood in Bathroom	
1982	The Soldier	Truck Driver / Cowboy #1	
1984	Beat Street	Spit	
1984	Death Mask	Police Officer #1	
1989	Tap	Dancer	
1990	Loose Cannons	Israeli Agent	
1990	Street Hunter	Restaurant Bodyguard	
1992	Malcolm X	Black Legion Member #2	
1998	Soldier		Uncredited
2000	28 Days	NY Cabdriver	
2017	Brawl in Cell Block 99	Bus Driver	(final film role)
