= Do the Ricky Bobby =

Single by B Hamp

from the album B Dash
- Released: March 15, 2009
- Genre: Hip Hop
- Length: 4:09
- Label: Malaco Records, CKB Entertainment
- Songwriter: Brandon Hampton

"Do the Ricky Bobby" is a song by American hip hop recording artist Brandon "B Hamp" Hampton, released as his debut single on March 15, 2008. Hamp describes the inspiration for the song came from Will Ferrell's character in 2006 film Talladega Nights: The Ballad of Ricky Bobby.

The song achieved fame originally through a viral video on Hamp's YouTube channel, which featured him dancing to the track along with a small backup dance troupe, to what was to become known as the "Ricky Bobby" dance. The dance came to be widely emulated on YouTube.

The artist has since removed the amateur video from his channel, and has replaced it with a more professional production, part of which was shot at the Texas Motor Speedway.

The song was officially released in March 2009 under Malaco Records and CKB Entertainment.

== Ricky Bobby Dance ==
The original YouTube video featured B-Hamp dancing, with a small backup group, to the song. Based on the story of the character of Ricky Bobby from the film Talladega Nights: The Ballad of Ricky Bobby, the dance featured motifs based on the characterization of Ricky Bobby and various important points in the story narrative.

In the October 2008 Entertainment Weekly interview, B Hamp describes the dance motifs to include: Steering a race car one handed, Celebratory posing, and a wheelchairing motion. The wheelchair motion is in reference to the scene in the movie when Ricky Bobby has a nervous breakdown and delusively believes he has become paraplegic.

== Reception ==
B Hamp's original "Do The Ricky Bobby" YouTube video was a popular hit, and widely emulated. The artist has since removed the original amateur video and replaced it with a new production grade music video, which has garnered over 2.3 million views.

The song and video is said to have been most popular with the Southern states, including Texas, Oklahoma, Louisiana, Arkansas and Georgia.

The single stayed on the Billboard Hot 100 for 6 weeks, and peaked at number 67.
