= Chana Eden =

Israeli-American actress (1932–2019)

- חנה עדן
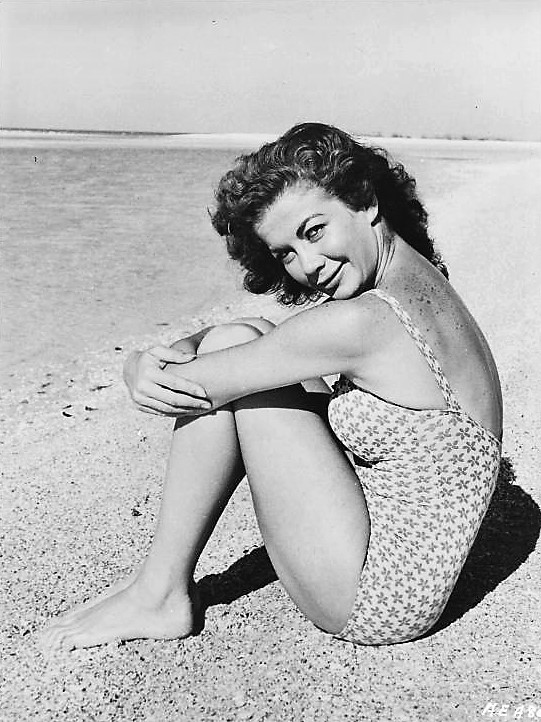
- Publicity photograph, c. 1958
- Born: Chana Mesyngier; 23 November 1932; Haifa, Mandatory Palestine
- Died: 30 March 2019 (aged 86); Rosh Pinna, Israel
- Occupations: Actress; singer
- Years active: 1958–1987
- Spouse: Roy Jordan(1956-1958) (divorced)

Chana Eden (Hebrew: חנה עדן, born Chana Mesyngier, Hebrew: חנה מסינגר); 23 November 1932 – 30 March 2019) was an Israeli-American actress and singer.

Her debut was in 1958, a film Wind Across the Everglades. She appeared in guest roles, in many US television series of the late 1950s and early 1960s. It was not until the 1980s that she returned to acting, on only two occasions.

== Biography ==
Chana Mesyngier was born in Haifa. Her parents were Rachel and Menachem Mesyngier, who was a pharmacist. She was educated at Haifa's French School Alliance. She studied dancing in an English ballet company. After her graduation from the French school, she enrolled and briefly attended classes at a commercial college. She enlisted in the Israeli Navy. She participated in the 1948 Palestine war.

She first arrived in the United States in 1953. She studied film directing and cutting in Hollywood. She took the surname Eden. She became a naturalized citizen of the United States in 1960 per the California, Southern District Court (Central) Naturalization Index.

== Career ==
Eden made her debut in Wind Across the Everglades (1958) and appeared in 30 television series. Eden appeared as an Argentine girl in an episode of The Rifleman in 1958. She played a young Shoshone woman in the Bonanza episode "The Last Hunt" (1959), the title character's wife in the Perry Mason Season 4, Episode 7 "The Case of the Clumsy Clown" (1960), and an Italian partisan named Elena in Season 1, Episode 4 "Ninety-Eight Cents Man" of The Gallant Men (1962).

Playing a Greek mail-order bride in a 1961 episode of Have Gun - Will Travel, Eden turns in a lively performance along with Charles Bronson, George Kennedy, and the series's star, Richard Boone. Her only recurring role in television was featured in two Adventures in Paradise episodes, "The Color of Venom" and "The Death-Divers" (both 1960).

== Performances ==
=== Filmography ===
- Wind Across the Everglades (1958)
- Snow White (1987)

=== Television ===
- The George Burns Show – episode: "The French Revue" (1958)
- Man with a Camera – episode: "Blind Spot" (1958)
- The Millionaire – episode: "The Eric Lodek Story" (1958)
- The Rifleman – episode: "The Gaucho" (1958)
- Behind Closed Doors – episode: "Mightier Than the Sword" (1959)
- Richard Diamond, Private Detective – episode: "Matador Murder" (1959)
- Bat Masterson – episode: "The Romany Knives" (1959)
- Westinghouse Desilu Playhouse – episode: "A Diamond for Carla" (1959)
- The Lineup – episode: "The Counterfeit Citizens" (1959)
- Bonanza – episode: "The Last Hunt" (1959)
- The Troubleshooters – episode: "The Big Blaze" (1960)
- Wanted Dead or Alive – episode: "Triple Vise" (1960)
- The Alaskans – episode: "Sign of the Kodiak" (1960)
- Perry Mason – episode: "The Case of the Clumsy Clown" (1960)
- The Aquanauts – episode: "Arms of Venus" (1960)
- Dante – episode: "The Jolly Roger Cocktail" (1960)
- Adventures in Paradise – episodes: "The Color of Venom" (1960), "The Death-Divers" (1960), and "Treasure Hunt" (1961)
- The Tab Hunter Show – episode: "Italian Riviera" (1961)
- The Islanders – episode: "The Pearls of Ratu" (1961)
- The Brothers Brannagan – episode: "Wheel of Fortune" (1961)
- Peter Gunn – episode: "Till Death Do Us Part" (1961)
- Have Gun – Will Travel – episode: "A Proof of Love" (1961)
- 77 Sunset Strip – episode: "The Reluctant Spy" (1962)
- The Gallant Men – episode: "The Ninety-Eight Cent Man" (1962)
- Naked City – episode: "The Virtues of Madame Douvay" (1962)
- Ensign O'Toole – episode: "Operation Intrigue" (1963)
- Kraft Suspense Theatre – episode: "The Long, Lost Life of Edward Smalley" (1963)
- Channing – episode: "The Trouble with Girls" (1964)
- Bob Hope Presents the Chrysler Theatre – episode: "The Sojourner" (1964)
- The Third Man – episode: "Judas Goat" (1964)
- Remembrance of Love (TV movie, 1982)
