= 30 Years to the Day =

Studio album by Rock Steady Crew and J.Period
- Released: 2007
- Genre: Hip hop
- Length: 79:12
- Label: Noiselands

30 Years to the Day is a 2007-released studio album by the American breakdancing and hip hop group Rock Steady Crew (as the group’s second studio album) and Brooklyn-based Mixtape DJ, remixer and hip-hop producer J.Period. The album is a 30-year commemorative compilation for the history of the group. It features various songs from old school artists such as Grandmaster Flash, Afrika Bambaataa, James Brown and Sugarhill Gang.

== Track listing ==
1. Crazy Legs Intro / Shaft in Africa
2. J. Period Intro
3. Scorpio
4. Theme from S.W.A.T. / Zulu War Chant
5. Heaven & Hell (Interlude)
6. Rapper's Delight
7. Funky Music Is the Thing
8. Think
9. Space Dust (Interlude)
10. It Takes Two
11. Apache
12. Set It Off
13. Know the Ledge
14. Treat 'Em Right
15. The Creator
16. You Must Learn (J. Period Break Remix)
17. Breaker's Revenge
18. Looking for the Perfect Beat
19. Planet Rock
20. Cavern / White Lines
21. Favorite Break (Interlude)
22. Mambo #5
23. Funky Nassau
24. Rock Creek Park
25. JS-1 Intro
26. JS Scratch Intro / Love 'n' Affection
27. Shifting Gears
28. Son of Scorpio / Stone Fox Chase
29. Theme from Planets / Pick Up the Pieces
30. Action
31. Catch a Groove
32. Satin Soul
33. I Like Funky Music
34. It's My Thing
35. Last Night Change It All
36. Let's Get Small / Get Up & Dance
37. Mardi Gras
38. Miss B'Way
39. I'm Gonna Get You
40. Greedy G
41. Back in Love Again
42. Daisy Lady
43. Theme from 2001
44. The Champ / Warm It Up Kane
45. Walk This Way / Art of Noise
46. Another One Bites the Dust / Boogie Down BX
47. Shack Up
48. Jam on the Groove
49. Hot Pants
50. I Know You Got Soul
51. Groove To Get Down
52. I Can't Stop / Tramp
53. Planetary Citizen
54. Joyous
55. Lovermaniacs (Sex) / Axel Foly Theme
56. Soul Makossa / Din Da Da
57. Runaway
58. Let's Dance / You and Love Are the Same
59. Once in a Lifetime
60. Gotta Get Out of Here
61. Favorite Break #2 (Interlude)
62. It's Just Begun
63. Keeping Rock Steady Alive
64. DV-One Intro
65. Rock Steady
66. Bustin' Loose
67. In E Gada Da Vida
68. Aquarius
69. Vitamin C
70. Blow Your Whistle
71. Blow Your Head
72. Clear
73. James Brown Tribute (Part 1)
74. James Brown Tribute (Part 2)
75. James Brown Tribute (Part 3)
76. James Brown Tribute (Part 4)
77. James Brown Tribute (Part 5)
78. James Brown Tribute (Part 6)
79. Crazy Legs Outro
80. Resurrection F. Mayda Del Valle (J. Period Remix)
