= Vašek =

Vašek (feminine: Vašková) is a Czech surname. It originated as a shortened form of the given name Václav. As a surname, it was first documented in 1378. Notable people with the surname include:

- Alena Vašková (born 1975), Czech tennis player
- Anton Vašek (1905–1946), Slovak Holocaust perpetrator
- Colton Vasek, American football player
- Petr Vašek (born 1979), Czech footballer
- Radomír Vašek (born 1972), Czech tennis player

== See also ==
- Vasek Pospisil (born 1990), Canadian tennis player
