= Fever One =

American breakdancer

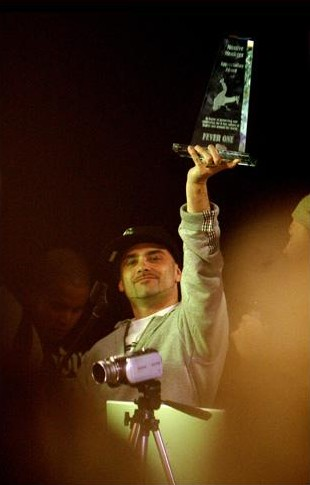
Fever One receiving Massive Monkees Day award in '07

Carter "Fever One" McGlasson is a breakdancer and DJ originally from Seattle, Washington who relocated to New York City in 1997, and eventually joined the world-famous Rock Steady Crew. He is most well known for his 'gunzblazin' style which he developed while studying with his mentors Icey Ice and Lil' Lep of the New York City Breakers.

== Biography ==
Inspired by a Poppin' Battle in Seattle's Central District, Fever One had become influenced by the spiritual aspect and competitiveness of the dance by the age of 10. Soon after, he identified with the aggressive dance, known as breakin' (the New York style of dancing). In 1982, he joined the Grand Master Breakers and performed for the Flash Children's Show on KING Broadcasting News in Seattle. In 1984 he won a battle to become a member of the professional crew The Seattle Circuit Breakers, sponsored by Adidas and Swatch. Between 1984 and 1986 he performed at the Seattle Car Show in the Kingdome, Children's Orthopedic Hospital Telethons, and Seattle Center's Bumbershoot Festival with Afrika Bambaataa and the Soul Sonic Force. During this time, he also participated in dance workshops at the Seattle Central Community College. In 1987, the world-famous Icey Ice of the New York City Breakers came to Seattle, giving Fever One the opportunity to dance with a renowned, professional b-boy (breaker) and to appear with DJ Mixmaster Ice of U.T.F.O.

In the early '90s Fever One taught hip-hop to children at local community facilities and held after school programs at middle schools. He joined a group of graffiti artists, b-boys, and DJs to create the DVS crew (Dropping Vicious Styles). Most performances during the early '90s were for Seattle youth and many performances were staged at the Langston Hughes Cultural Arts Center. During this time, he staged youth b-boy battles and worked with at-risk children, teaching them dancing, graffiti art, DJing and MCing. In the summer of 1995 he traveled to Europe where he performed with local dancers from France, Germany, and Switzerland, exchanging styles and performing on the street.

In the summer of 1997, he moved to the birthplace of hip-hop, the Bronx, so that he would be able to study and learn more about the history of hip-hop culture. He performed at the Centennial Anniversary of St. James Park in the Bronx and Funk Master Flex's Birthday Bash at the Palladium with KRS-One, danced on the DJ Honda video Check-the-Mic, and performed at the 23rd annual Zulu Nation Anniversary. He became a member of GhettOriginal Productions Dance Company and joined the cast of the "jubilantly hyperactive" and "astonishing" off-broadway show Jam on the Groove at Walt Disney World's Epcot Center. In 1998, he performed shows in Italy and Germany and choreographed routines for Invasion of the B-Girls in Seattle, a production designed to promote women's contributions to hip-hop culture.

Since then, Fever One has become a member of the world-famous Rock Steady Crew which has taken him to new heights in his career. Fever One was chosen as one of the representatives from three generations of b-boys to teach on "DMC B-Boy Foundations" instructional video. He has lectured about the history of hip-hop at Yale, Princeton, Rutgers, and the University of Washington where he was invited "to provide firsthand knowledge of the local scene and its history".. He has had the opportunity to perform in many prestigious venues: Lincoln Center with The Roots, Madison Square Garden where he choreographed for and performed with salsa singer Huey Dunnbar, Carnegie Hall with Wyclef Jean, and again at Madison Square Garden for the VH1 Fashion Awards with Cuba Gooding Jr. He has walked the runway for Enyce clothing during New York Fashion Week, appeared on VH1’s Holla’ Back TV show, judged the Freestyle Fridays on Black Entertainment Television’s 106th & Park; and appeared on BET’s hip-hop show, "The Basement". The Source, Jane, XXL, Stress and Blaze are just a few of the many magazines in which he has appeared. In the past few years, Fever One has appeared in a TV commercial for VH1’s "Movies That Rock", was featured in Tony Touch’s music video “The Greatest DJ” and Gangstarr's music video "Skills", appeared on the Lipton Brisk Flavor U.S. Tour, and was a member of the Rock Steady Crew’s Australia Tour which traveled to five major Australian cities. He was also a guest performer on ABC's Dancing With the Stars as part of the Rock Steady Crew. He co-starred in, co-wrote, and co-produced the 2008 Caid Productions' award winning documentary "Way Of The Bboy".

Currently, he resides in Seattle and continues to pass down the b-boy tradition through teaching classes, events, judging, and choreographing internationally. To this day, his 'gunzblazin' style continues to influence b-boys/b-girls around the world. A large part of his teaching time is spent working with Art Corps, Seattle's largest non-profit youth arts educator.

In addition to keeping the b-boy culture alive, he has re-ignited his passion for the turntables since moving back to his hometown. Fever One not only spins locally in Seattle, but in cities across the country and abroad. As a DJ, he has shared the stage with the likes of Slick Rick, Diamond D from DITC, Rakaa from Dilated Peoples, and Clipse and has played sets on East Village Radio, at Rock Steady Crew anniversary events, Massive Monkees anniversary events, and numerous other b-boy events, clubs, and lounges. He and co-host DJ Miguel Rockwell spin old school classics and new school heaters on their weekly internet radio show, TRUE RADIO.
