= Crazy Legs (dancer) =

American breakdancer (b. 1966)

- Born: Richard Colón; January 1, 1966 (age 60); The Bronx, New York, U.S.
- Known for: B-boying
- Movement: Hip-hop

Richard Colón (born January 1, 1966), better known by his stage name Crazy Legs, is an American b-boy who was featured in the earliest stories on hip hop dancing to appear in mainstream press, and as president of the Rock Steady Crew brought the form to London and Paris in 1983. Today he is also involved in community outreach, dance instruction, and dance theater productions. He has appearanced in fiction films and documentaries. Crazy Legs is current president of the Rock Steady Crew.

== Career ==
Richard "Crazy Legs" Colón grew up in the Inwood section of Manhattan, New York City, where he was introduced to "breaking" by his older brother when he was nine. He was an original member of the Rock Steady Crew after its foundation in 1979. Dance critic Sally Banes in an April 1981 piece on the form in the Village Voice quotes Crazy Legs listing the best dancers extant and documents his accidental invention of the "W" move, in which the dancer sits with his legs double-backed behind him. The next month saw The New York Times cover a three-day conference on "Bronx folk culture". "There is a system of apprentices: a 'Lil' Crazy Legs with Crazy Legs," the Times reported, "Dance steps are performed solo to an accompaniment called rapping - chanting voice and percussion."

His first film appearance was as himself in Charlie Ahearn's independent release Wild Style (1982), followed by his featuring in the early documentary on hip hop culture Style Wars (PBS, 1983). As a craze for all things hip hop took hold, the 16-year-old Crazy Legs, now President of the Rock Steady Crew, took hip hop dance to Paris and London as part of the New York City Rap Tour, with recording artists Afrika Bambaataa and Grandmixer D.ST, graffiti artists Fab 5 Freddie and Futura 2000, and the World Champion Fantastic Four Double Dutch Girls. Appearances in Hollywood films were another consequence: he was a street dancer and, as with Wild Style, played himself in the fiction film Beat Street (Orion, 1984).

In the 1983 film Flashdance, he was a body double for a difficult break dancing sequence.

In 1991 he danced in So! What Happens Now?, "probably the first hip-hop production on a mainstream dance stage in New York City," according to The New York Times, which reflected that the production proved "street dance is an art as demanding and inventive as mainstream dance forms like ballet and jazz." The following year came Concrete Jungle as part of a program at the Lincoln Center which the Times called "a turning point in the evolution of urban street dance," the piece itself being "extraordinarily affecting". The "jubilantly hyperactive" and "astonishing" Jam on the Groove debuted in 1995, and in 1999 Crazy Legs instructed dancers of the Urban Youth Theater for their show Minotaur.

Crazy Legs has hosted b-boy contests, appearances at live events, and staging of Rock Steady Crew Anniversaries. He provided voice-overs for the television comedy series Kung Faux. He is also a character in the video game Def Jam Fight For NY. In 2006 he was invited by the Smithsonian Institution to contribute to a collection for the National Museum of American History. Crazy Legs officially retired from competition as of July 28, 2012 after competing at the Rock Steady Crew's 35th Anniversary at The Altman Building in Manhattan, NY.

== Rock Steady Anniversary parties ==
As president of Rock Steady Crew, Crazy Legs and his Backspin Productions hosts and organizes the annual Rock Steady Anniversary, a community event that honors deceased members of the crew and celebrates hip hop culture. The parties feature DJs, breakdancing, MCs, and graffiti artists. The group also holds the annual Celebrity Basketball Tournament during the yearly anniversary celebrations to raise money for the Greenwich Village Youth Council in New York. In 2003, New York Mayor Michael Bloomberg proclaimed July 26 to be "Rock Steady Crew Day" in New York City during their 26th Anniversary Celebration at Pier 54. Sportswear company Fila debuted the "Rock Steady Crew 77" sneaker in April 2004.

== Awards ==
As part of the Rock Steady Crew, Crazy Legs won a 1992 Bessie Award for choreography. In 1994 he received the Hip Hop Pioneer Award from The Source. He was presented with the Source Youth Foundation Image Award in 2003. He has also earned the 2003 AARTS Award from the Bay Shore Schools Arts Education Fund and was honored as the National Godfather of the 2003 Jersey City Puerto Rican Day Parade. He was nominated for an MTV Award for Best Choreography for his work with Wyclef Jean. “Jam on the Groove” was nominated for best choreography at the Drama Desk Awards in 1996. His dance program at The POINT CDC for young people in South Bronx garnered him the “New Yorker of the Week” Award from New York 1 News.
