= Frosty Freeze =

American dancer (1963–2008)

- Born: Wayne Frost; December 4, 1963; New York City, New York
- Died: April 3, 2008 (aged 44); Manhattan, New York
- Known for: B-boying
- Movement: Hip hop

Wayne "Frosty Freeze" Frost (December 4, 1963 – April 3, 2008), also known as The Freeze To Please, was an American old school hip hop b-boy known as a member of the second generation of the hip hop/breakdancing group, Rock Steady Crew. His nickname was a play on words based on the well-known milkshake-serving restaurant of the same name.

He was known for his comedic, acrobatic, and inventive style. His trademark move is known as "dead man drop", a move that he created accidentally by attempting a poorly executed backflip and landing on his back.

His was featured in various films and documentaries such as Flashdance, Wild Style, Style Wars, and The Freshest Kids; he also appeared on the cover of The Village Voice in 1981. He was also featured in early hip hop music videos such as Afrika Bambaataa and The Soulsonic Force's "Planet Rock" and Malcolm McLaren's "Buffalo Gals".

In 2004, he and several other members of The Rock Steady Crew were honored at the VH-1 Hip Hop Honors.

Frosty Freeze lived in New York City. He regularly made appearances at many hip-hop events throughout the New York metropolitan area and elsewhere in the United States.

== Death ==
He became increasingly ill during early 2008 from an undisclosed long illness, went on life support on March 27, and died on April 3, 2008.
