= The Roxy (New York City) =

Defunct nightclub in Manhattan, New York

- (sometimes known as Roxy NYC)
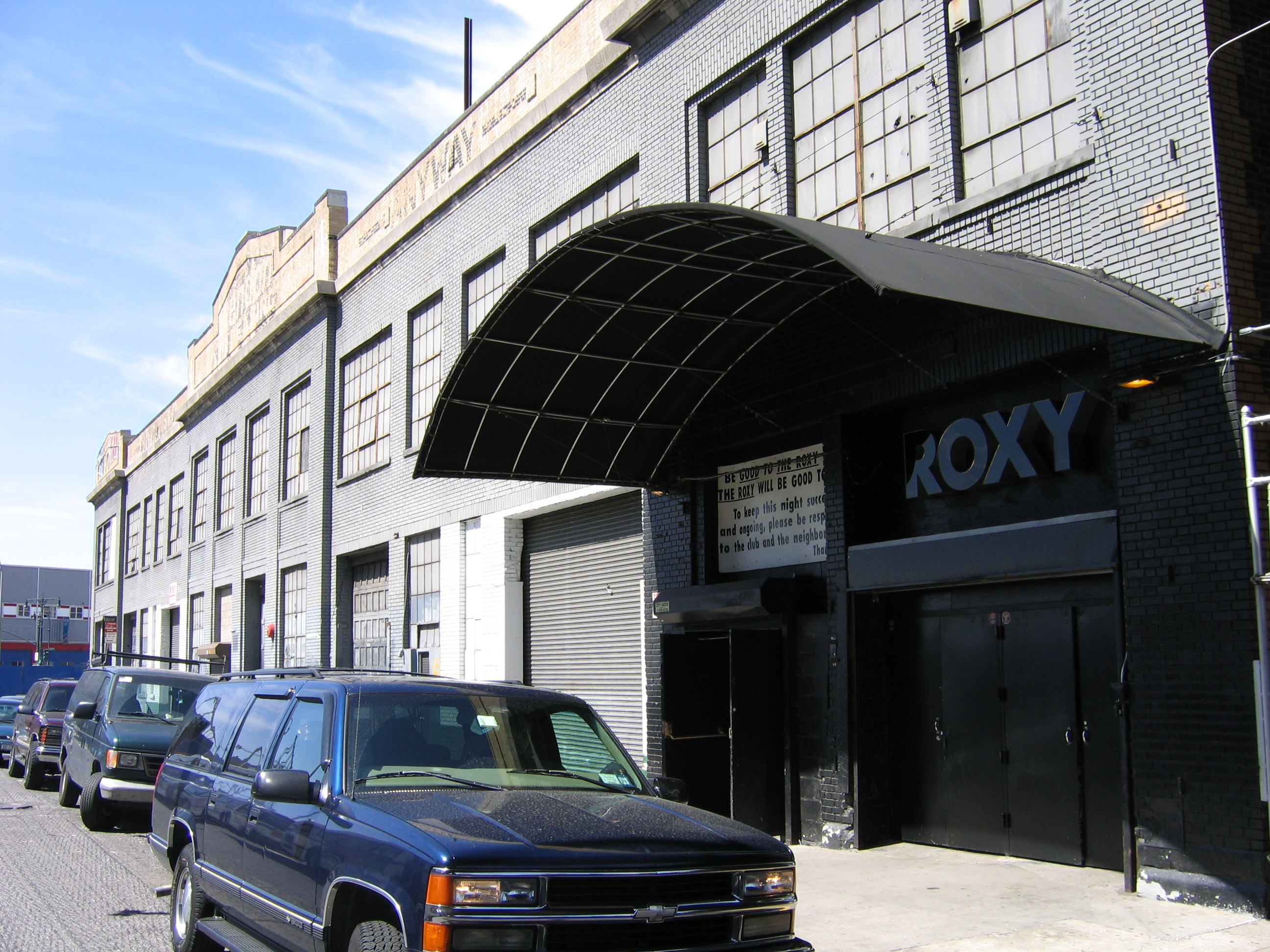
- Exterior of The Roxy (2005)
- Interactive map of The Roxy
- Address: 515 West 18th Street
- Location: New York City (Chelsea, Manhattan), New York, U.S.
- Coordinates: 40.745013°N 74.006959°W
- Owner: Richard Newhouse and Steven Greenberg (1978–1985) as Roxy's Roller Disco; Gene DiNino (1985–2007)
- Type: roller rink and nightclub

Construction
- Opened: 1978 (48 years ago)
- Closed: March 10, 2007 (19 years ago)

The Roxy (sometimes Roxy NYC) was a nightclub and former disco roller rink, located at 515 West 18th Street in Manhattan, a borough of New York City, United States.

Located in the Chelsea section of Manhattan, it began as a roller disco in 1978, founded by Steve Bauman, Richard Newhouse and Steve Greenberg. It was acquired in 1985 by Gene DiNino.

The Roxy closed permanently in March 2007.

== Operation ==
Beginning in the early 1980s, the owners began hosting private party nights. Referred to by many as the "Studio 54 of roller rinks", these parties thrived for several years. Then, as the popularity of skating began to fade, the space was revamped into a dance club in June 1982 by Ruza Blue whose idea it was to transform the roller rink into a dance club.

The Roxy hosted a party for the Olympic gold medal-winning USA Ice Hockey team in 1980.

Ruza Blue, nicknamed "Kool Lady Blue", produced the first multi-racial, multi-cultural hip-hop dance clubs in New York City. She was the founder of Club Negril (1981–82) and The Roxy where she showcased elements of hip hop, plus more for the first time downtown in a nightclub environment on a regular weekly basis; this was where true hip hop first gained recognition. Her clubs featured a mash up of all musical styles from early hip hop, electro, funk, soul, disco, rock, punk, dub and electronic dance music.

Jon Baker, the future founder of Gee Street Records, worked the door. Hip-hop pioneers, including Grand Mixer D.ST Jazzy Jay and Afrika Bambaataa began DJing there and Kool Lady Blue sponsored breaking or b-boy/b-girl competitions featuring the Rock Steady Crew, Graffiti Artist Murals, Emcees like Fab 5 Freddy hosting the nights and she even had the idea to book Double-dutch exhibitions by The Fantastic Four local American Double Dutch League champions and added Double Dutch to the hip-hop equation at Negril and The Roxy.

Musicians including Madonna, Run DMC, Kraftwerk, Shannon, Malcolm McLaren, New Edition, Kurtis Blow, The Beastie Boys, Yello, Dead or Alive, Cher, Bette Midler, Whitney Houston, Liza Minnelli, Chaka Khan, Donna Summer, Cyndi Lauper, Jorge Perez Evelyn,Grace Jones, Yoko Ono, LL Cool J, Lisa Marie Presley, Gloria Gaynor, and George Clinton and the P-Funk All-Stars all performed at the Roxy.

The site of many "dance floor tests" by recording artists, producers, and remixers, the club's notoriously discerning, racially mixed clientele and cross-cultural ethos was considered the ideal crowd to inspire on the dance floor. Their DJs first played the test record of EBN-OZN's white rap/spoken word "AEIOU Sometimes Y" in 1982, the first commercially released record made on a computer in the United States.

Kool Lady Blue's Friday nights at The Roxy played a huge role in the evolution of hip hop and electronic dance music and are integral to hip-hop history. She was also one of the first to promote hip-hop culture on to the world stage.

The Roxy hosted one of New York City's largest weekly gay dance nights, Roxy Saturdays, promoted by John Blair Promotions, which featured many famous DJs including Junior Vasquez, Manny Lehman, Hex Hector, Victor Calderone, David Guetta, Frankie Knuckles, Paul van Dyk, Offer Nissim, Hector Fonseca and Peter Rauhofer.

During the late 1980s, it was operated under the name 1018, and was closed down in 1989 by the New York City Office of Midtown Enforcement as a nuisance, based on allegations of underage drinking, drug sales, and violence.

== Closure ==
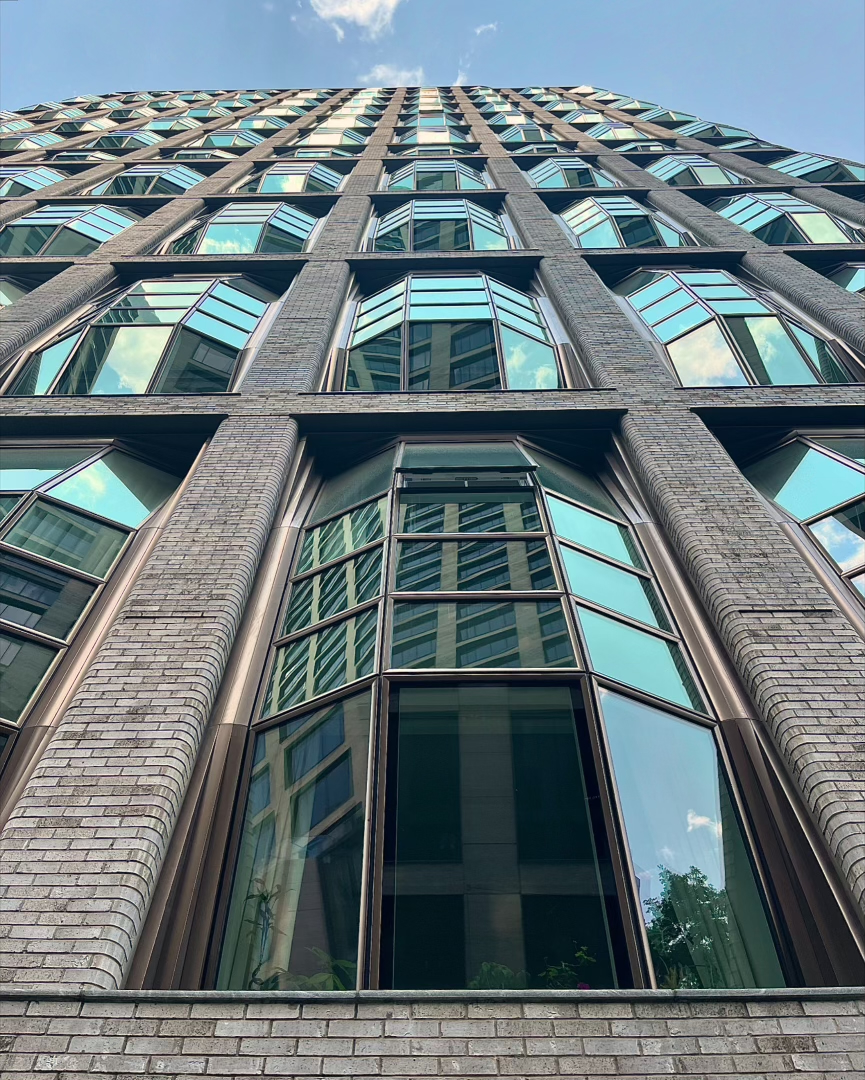
Lantern House that replaced The Roxy nightclub in New York City (2024).

The Roxy had stopped for several weeks in the fall of 2006, but resumed operation once again on December 2, 2006. The club closed permanently on March 10, 2007. A documentary film about the club's final party, entitled Roxy: The Last Dance, premiered in August 2008 on the LOGO cable television network.

There were plans for the club to be demolished in order to make room for new residential apartments. However, in July 2008, there was news that the Roxy would reopen under new management. The local community board that represents the interests of the residents near the club stated that the club could reopen if it served the community in the long run.

As of September 2017, the building was undergoing demolition to make way for high-end residential condominiums overlooking the adjacent High Line Park.

In September 2021, Lantern House luxury residential condominiums opened where The Roxy once stood.

== In popular culture ==
A performance at the club by Afrika Bambaattaa was captured in the 1984 dance drama film Beat Street.

== See also ==
- List of nightclubs in New York City
- Webster Hall
