= Rennie Harris =

American dancer

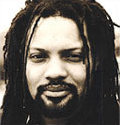
- Born: Lorenzo Harris; January 28, 1964; Philadelphia, Pennsylvania
- Occupations: Dancer, Choreographer, Director
- Years active: 1976 - Present

Lorenzo Harris (born January 28, 1964) is a dancer, choreographer, artistic director and professor of hip-hop dance. Harris formed the first and longest running hip-hop dance touring company, Rennie Harris Puremovement in 1992. In 2007, he conceived another touring company, RHAW or Rennie Harris Awe-Inspiring Works.

Harris has received numerous awards for his theatrical hip-hop dance performances or what he refers to as, "Hip-Hop concert dance". He is known for such works as Rome and Jewels, Facing Mekka, 100 NAKED LOCKS, Heaven, and a host of innovative repertory works, which have broken many stereotypes and expectations of hip-hop dance. After receiving an honorary doctorate from Bates College and an honorary doctorate from Columbia College, Harris' company was chosen as 1 of 4 US companies to serve as cultural ambassadors for President Obama's "Dance Motion USA." In 2012, it toured the Middle East, performing and giving hip hop workshops to Egyptians, Israelis and Palestinians.

== Early years ==
Growing up in North Philadelphia, Rennie was first inspired by Don Campbell’s group, The Campbell Lockers, after seeing them on the TV show Soul Train. He started dancing socially as a kid but when he was around 12 years old, he started a dance group called Cobra III with his brother and childhood friend, nicknamed “Brainy.” Cobra III entered and won a local church talent show, marking the beginning of Harris’ life commitment to dance.

== Career ==
Harris started his career by forming dance groups during his teens, such as the GQ group called, The Step Masters and a popping crew called, The Scanner Boys. These groups opened and performed with such acts as: Afrika Bambaataa, West Street Mob, Kool Moe Dee and the Treacherous Three, Super Nature, currently known as Salt-n-Pepa, Grandmaster Flash and the Furious Five, and Doug E Fresh, Double Trouble, Roxanne Shante, UTFO, Whodini, Newcleus, Run-DMC, Kurtis Blow, Madonna, Brandy, Aliah, Sugar Hill Gang, Sister Sledge, Gloria Gaynor, The Tramps, and Debarge, among others.

Harris worked for the TV dance shows, "Dancin' On Air", "Dance Party USA", and then was given his own show to host called, "One House Street." Harris finished his commercial career with a prolonged tour with Cathy Sledge of Sister Sledge, as a choreographer and dancer. Harris then returned to Philadelphia and The Scanner Boys to continue to innovate hip-hop dance. The Scanner Boys disbanded in 1992 with their last performance at the “Dancing in the Streets" festival held at 30th Street Station in Philadelphia.

=== Puremovement ===
Harris founded Rennie Harris Puremovement in 1991–92, the company was created to further his efforts to preserve and disseminate hip-hop culture. The company's mission is to re-educate about hip-hop and its culture through its artistic work, lecture demonstrations, and discussions. The company currently performs newer repertory works such as: "Something to Do with Love", "Get It," and "Love American Style," among a host of other works. The company has performed such evening length productions as: "Rome and Jewels", "Facing Mekka", and "Heaven", for which they have won numerous awards. 2012 marked the 20th Anniversary of Rennie Harris Puremovement during which the company toured excerpts of past works as well as newer works in commemoration.

=== Illadelph Legends of Hip-Hop Festival ===
Harris started Illadelph Legends of Hip-Hop Festival in 1998 to bring together the pioneers of the various forms of Street Dance. Focusing primarily on teaching technique, philosophy, history and aesthetic of street dance. Illadelph dance was the first of its kind and was the catalyst for many of the Street Dance intensives to date. Devoid of competition the festival is believed to be the first to only offer dance classes, panel discussions, and performances. Some of the seminal and legendary pioneers that taught at Illadelph were pioneers such as Don Campbell of The Campbell Lockers, Mr. Wiggles, Ken Swift, Crazy Legs, and international artists like Meech from France, Hiro from Japan, and Eva Shou from Denmark. The festival passes on the knowledge, tradition, and dance vocabulary of the various forms, such as Popping, Breaking, Locking, House dance, Waacking, and vogue. Illadelph Legends is the first Street Dance festival to specifically feature and promote technical classes and workshops on the history and theory with the pioneers and historians of street dance young and old.

== Scholarship ==
Rennie started teaching hip-hop at the age of 15 with the Smithsonian Institution and continues to teach at various universities across the world. While is company is touring Rennie teaches at the University of Colorado Boulder from August 26-December 18 and at the University of Texas Austin from January 15-May 15. In addition when traveling with his company he teaches workshops and lectures on the history of hip-hop and the various techniques of street dance that sprang from the culture. In 2010, Harris received an honorary Doctorate of Fine Arts from Bates College and a Doctorate in the Arts and Humanities from Columbia College for his work and commitment to Street and hip-hop dance. He has taught at Universities such as the University of Colorado Boulder, Stanford University, New York University, University of California, Los Angeles, Temple University, Villanova University, University of Pennsylvania, Drexel University, Ohio State University, University of Michigan, University of Hawaii, Harvard University, among many others. As a part of his efforts to educate the world about hip-hop, he passes on his historical knowledge of the dance through performances all over the world, including but not limited to: London, Italy, Japan, China, Switzerland, Germany, Scotland, West Africa, Finland, the Netherlands, France, Egypt, Israel, Jordan, New Zealand, Perth, Auckland, Brazil, Jamaica, Trinidad, and the Bahamas. In addition, he has performed in theaters such as the Brooklyn Academy of Music, Lincoln Center, Kimmel Center for the Performing Arts, Adrienne Arsht Center for the Performing Arts, Kennedy Center, Jacob's Pillow, Joyce Theater, Symphony Space, New Victory Theater, The Apollo Theatre in New York, Sadler's Wells Theatre (London), The Southbank Centre (London) and many other theaters and universities in the US and internationally.

== Choreographed works ==
- "Dear Frankie" Hubbard Street Dance Chicago (2023)
- "Lazarus" Alvin Ailey American Dance Theater (2018)
- (Vegas Contemporary Dance Company) (2011)
- "Home" (Alvin Ailey American Dance Theater) (2011)
- "Awake" (The Philadelphia Dance Company- Philadanco) (2011)
- "Another One Bites the Dust" (RHAW) (2011)
- “Voices” (Contact Theatre) (2010)
- "3 B-boys & a Girl" (RHAW) (2010)
- "Image" (RHAW) (2010)
- "A Man’s World" (RHAW) (2010)
- “Reign” (Lula Washington) (2009)
- "Lavender Lover" (University of Colorado Boulder) (2009)
- (Rutgers University) (2009)
- (Gus Giordano Jazz Company ) (2009)
- “Something to do with Love” (University of California, Irvine) (2008)
- “Endangered Species- solo by Desmond Richardson" (Complexions Contemporary Ballet) (2007)
- “Philadelphia Experience” (The Philadelphia Dance Company) (2007)
- “Jacobs Ladder” (Dayton Contemporary Dance Company) (2007)
- “Pure Dance” (RHPM) (2007)
- (William Penn Foundation) (2007)
- (Ford Foundation) (2007)
- "Ms. Spellings of Be" (2006)
- “Meditation of a Goddess” (Goddess) (2006)
- “PrinceScareKrow Road to the Emerald City” (Rennie Harris) (2006)
- “100NAKEDLOCKS” (RHPM) (2006)
- “Heaven” (RHPM) (2006)
- “Human” (University of the Arts) (2006)
- “Soul” (Sam Houston State University) (2006)
- (Expressions Dance Company) (2005)
- “Scourge” (Marc Bamuthi Joseph) (2005)
- (Colorado Ballet) (2004)
- "Love Stories" (Alvin Ailey American Dance Theater) (2004)
- "Facing Mekka" (RHPM) (2003)
- "Honoring the Source" (Legends of Hip-Hop) (2001)
- (Ballet Memphis) (2001)
- "Rome & Jewels" (RHPM) (2000)
- Pan Logo (1998)
- Mr. Campbell Lock (1998)
- Jazz, Tap, Hip-Hop (1997)
- "March of the Antmen" (1997)
- “Shut Up and Dance!” (Pennsylvania Ballet) (1997)
- Rennie Harris & Grisha Coleman Pure Movement & Hot Mouth Premiere “Every Good Boy Does Fine” Painted Bride Art Center (1997)
- "Hip-Hop and Holler!" (1997)
- (John Coltrane Project) (1996)
- Art Works in Different Place (1996)
- "Lorenzo’s Oil" (Philadelphia Museum of Art, John Cage Exhibit) (1995)
- "Fallen Crumbs from the Cake" (Pennsylvania Prison Society) (1995)
- "Students of the Asphalt Jungle" (Chuck Davis) (1995)
- The Rainbow Connection (1995)
- Patriots (1995)
- "State of Mind II" (Ivrim Festival) (1994)
- Prima Materia Phila, PA (1994)
- "Death Becomes Me" (1993)
- "3 Minutes with You" (1993)
- "P-Funk" (RHPM) (1993)
- "Peace Out to James" (1993)
- "Silent House" (1993)
- "Beautiful Human Lies" (1993)
- "State of Dazement" (1992)
- "Endangered Species" (Mime Now Festival) (1992)
- "Fresh Fruit" (1992)
- "Puremovement" (1991)
- "Hip-Hop to Be-Bop" (1987)
- "Private Dancer" (1986)
- "Nuclear War" (1986)
- "Africana" (1985)
- "Nuclear Wild Style" (1985)
- "Oriental Pop" (1983)
- "Planet Rock" (1982)
- "Step Master" (1978)
- "Cobra" (1977)

== Honors ==
- Samuel H. Scripps American Dance Festival Award for Lifetime Achievement in Choreography (2023)
- Dance Motion USA (2011)
- Creative Ambassador of Philadelphia PA (2011)
- Honorary Doctorate in Arts and Humanities, Bates College (2010)
- Recipient of the Guggenheim Fellowship (2010)
- Black Theater Alvin Ailey Award (2009)
- Rutgers University Honorary Committee “Launch Pad” (2009)
- Nominated for the Guggenheim Award (2009)
- National Endowment for the Arts (2009)
- New England Foundation for the Arts (2009)
- Dance Place Honors Rennie Harris (2008)
- William Shakespeare Award (2008)
- Master Choreography (2008)
- United States Artists Fellowship (2007)
- Governors Artist of the Year Award (2007)
- Philadelphia Rocky Award (Peer recognition) (2007)
- Kulu Mele “African-Rooted Dance, Arts and Culture” Award (2007)
- Ford Foundation-Future Aesthetics (2006)
- Ford Foundation-Artography Award (2006)
- Ford Foundation-Preservation (2005)
- Kennedy Center-Master of African-American Choreography (2005)
- Awarded Key to the City of Philadelphia (2005)
- Ford Foundation-Research & Preservation (2004)
- Pennsylvania Council on the Arts (2004)
- Awarded Key to the City of South Beach (2004)
- Alpert Awards in the Arts-Fellowship (2003)
- Philadelphia -Best of Philly (2003)
- Pennsylvania Council on the Arts (2003)
- William Penn Foundation (2003)
- Creative Capital (2003)
- Samuel Fels Foundation (2003)
- Stockton Rush Bartol (2003)
- Alvin Ailey Black Theater Award (2002)
- Alvin Ailey Black Theater Award (2001)
- Bessie Awards (2001)
- Laurence Olivier Award (nominee) UK (2001)
- Voted most influential Philadelphian in 100 years (2000)
- National Endowment for the Arts (2000)
- National Dance Project (2000)
- Cultural Fund (2000)
- Pew Charitable Trusts-Dance Advance (1999)
- Ethnic Dance Award (1997)
- Certificate of Achievement (1997)
- Pew Charitable Trusts-Dance Advance (1997)
- Pew Charitable Trusts-Fellowship (1996)
- City of Philadelphia Cultural Fund Grant (1996)
- Pew Charitable Trusts-Dance Advance (1995)
- Philadelphia Repertory Development Initiative Grant (1995)
- Philadelphia Repertory Development Initiative Grant (1993)
- Most Exciting Dancer/Choreographer (1993)
- City of Philadelphia (citation) (1988)
- Best Of Philadelphia (citation) (1984)
