= 1865 Philadelphia mayoral election =

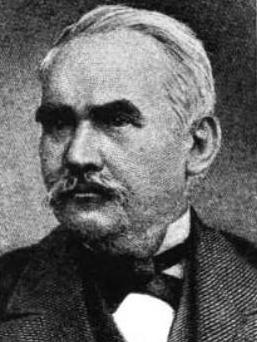

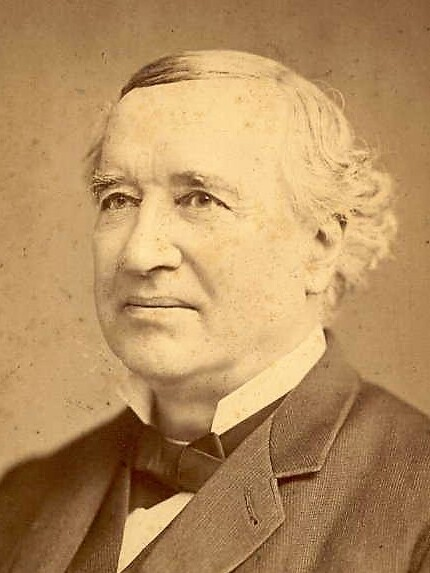
Nominee	Morton McMichael	Daniel M. Fox
Party	Republican	Democratic
Popular vote	45,098	39,668
Percentage	53.20%	46.80%
Mayor before election
Alexander Henry
Republican
Elected mayor
Morton McMichael
Republican

The 1865 Philadelphia mayoral election saw the election of Morton McMichael.

== Results ==
1865 Philadelphia mayoral election
Party	Candidate	Votes	%
Republican	Morton McMichael	45,098	53.20
Democratic	Daniel M. Fox	39,668	46.80
Turnout		84,766	
