= Daniel M. Fox =

American politician (1819-1890)

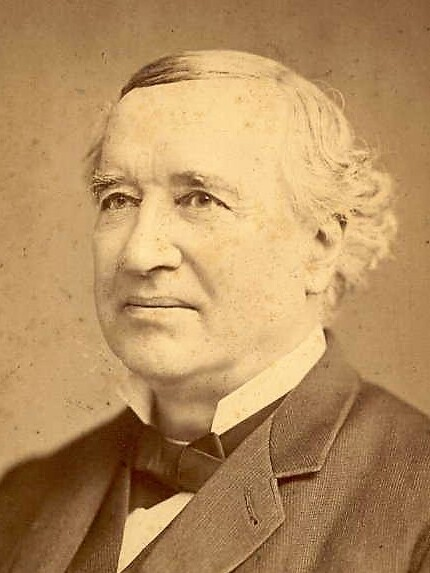

71st Mayor of Philadelphia, Pennsylvania
- In office January 1, 1869 – January 1, 1872
- Preceded by: Morton McMichael
- Succeeded by: William S. Stokley

Personal details
- Born: June 16, 1819 Philadelphia, Pennsylvania, U.S.
- Died: March 20, 1890 (aged 70) Atlantic City, New Jersey, U.S.
- Resting place: West Laurel Hill Cemetery, Bala Cynwyd, Pennsylvania
- Party: Democratic

Daniel M. Fox (June 16, 1819 – March 20, 1890) was an American politician who served as a Democratic Mayor of Philadelphia from 1869 to 1872.

== Early life ==
Fox was born June 16, 1819, in Philadelphia, Pennsylvania, to John and Margaret Fox. He was raised and educated in Northern Liberties Township. He worked as a store salesman and then in conveyancing, where he worked under a practitioner for five years before going into business for himself.

== Career ==
At twenty-one, he was elected a school director in Northern Liberties, including service as president of the board, and also represented the district in the board of health and was elected a director of Girard College by the Philadelphia City Council. He represented Philadelphia's 12th Ward in the Select Council for three years until 1861.

Fox ran unsuccessfully for mayor as the nominee of the Democratic Party in 1862 and 1865, losing to Republicans Alexander Henry and Morton McMichael, respectively. He won the mayoral election of 1868 against Hector Tyndale by a close margin, a matter that was resolved by the courts after the results were contested.

When he became mayor, he fired almost all of the city police officers since most were appointees of Republican politicians. During his tenure, improvements were made to sanitary conditions in the city and the Philadelphia Fire Department was established, a move that proved controversial with the displaced volunteer fire houses, a number of which displayed effigies of the mayor.

He opposed blacks riding in Philadelphia passenger railway cars, and in 1870, Federal troops were called in to prevent Fox from using police officers to prevent blacks from accessing polling locations. However, he did offer a reward of $1,000 for the suspected killers of Octavius Catto, but they were never captured.

After his term as mayor, Fox served as president of the Philadelphia Conveyancers' Association. He died on March 20, 1890, in Atlantic City, New Jersey, and was interred at West Laurel Hill Cemetery in Bala Cynwyd, Pennsylvania.

Political offices
| Preceded by Morton McMichael | Mayor of Philadelphia; 1869–1872 | Succeeded by William S. Stokley |
