= Reckless (Chris "The Glove" Taylor & David Storrs song) =

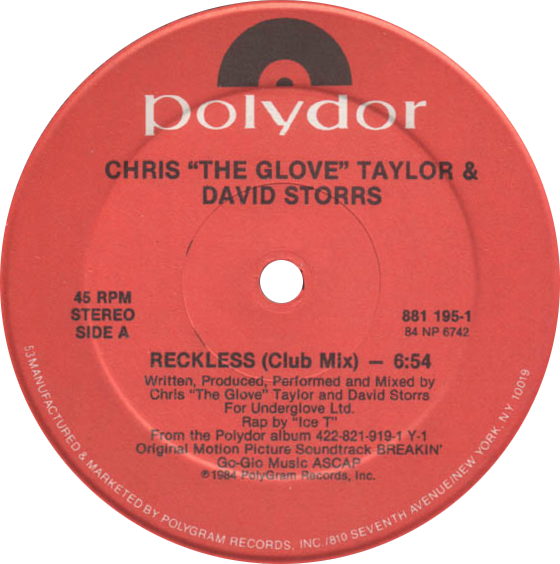
- Side A of US retail 12-inch single

Single by Chris "The Glove" Taylor & David Storrs, feat. Ice-T

from the album Breakin'
- A-side: "Reckless"
- Released: 1984
- Recorded: 1984
- Genre: Electro hop, rap, old school hip hop
- Length: 3:30 (original B-side); 6:54 (club mix)
- Label: Polydor Records; UMG/Taxidermi Records (re-release)
- Songwriter(s): Chris "The Glove" Taylor, David Storrs
- Producer(s): Chris "The Glove" Taylor, David Storrs

Chris "The Glove" Taylor & David Storrs, feat. Ice-T singles chronology
"Killers" (1984)	"Reckless" (1984)	"Ya Don't Quit" (1985)

"Reckless" is a song by Chris "The Glove" Taylor & David Storrs, featuring Ice-T. The song was released in 1984 on the soundtrack of Breakin'.

== Track listing ==
=== Side A ===
1. Reckless (Club Mix)

=== Side B ===
1. Tibetan Jam

== Personnel ==
- Tracy Lauren Marrow – vocals
- Chris "The Glove" Taylor – writer, producer, performer, mixing
- David Storrs – writer, producer, performer, mixing, recorder (credited as The Alien Wizard)

== Legacy ==
During an interview on the Friday Night with Jonathan Ross on 15 May 2009, rapper Eminem said "Reckless" was the first hip-hop record he had ever heard; it inspired him to rap.
