= Michael Chambers =

American dancer and actor (born 1967)

- Born: November 13, 1967 (age 58); Wilmington, California, U.S.
- Other name: Boogaloo Shrimp
- Occupations: Actor; dancer
- Years active: 1983–present
- Known for: Tony "Turbo" in Breakin' and Breakin' 2: Electric Boogaloo
- Website: http://www.boogalooshrimp.com

Michael "Boogaloo Shrimp" Chambers (born November 13, 1967) is an American dancer and actor, known for his role as "Turbo" in the 1984 film Breakin' and its sequel, Breakin' 2: Electric Boogaloo, in which he is credited as "Boogaloo Shrimp". Chambers, along with his Breakin' series co-star Adolfo "Shabba Doo" Quiñones and other dancers from the films, were prominently featured in the music videos for Lionel Richie's "All Night Long" (1983) and Chaka Khan's "I Feel for You" (1984).

== Early life ==
Chambers, born in Wilmington, California, is the youngest of four. In 1978, while at junior high, Chambers saw a member of the Samoan American dance group Blue City Strutters perform. The group would influence Chambers' style by performing King Tut and domino routines. Initially, he formulated his style of dance through his interest in fantasy and sci-fi television shows, including the work of Ray Harryhausen and others. He credits his older brother with introducing him to the "moonwalk".

While still a teenager, Chambers' older brother would take him to Redondo Beach, California, where he would perform for money. Chambers' sister gave him a jacket that read "Mike a.k.a. Boogaloo Shrimp", his street dancing name. Chambers would meet Bruno "Pop N Taco" Falcon and Timothy "Popin' Pete". Both would later be featured in the Breakin' series.

== Career ==
Chambers' early stints were through television commercials, followed by an appearance in the music video for Lionel Richie's "All Night Long". He made appearances in the videos for Chaka Khan's "I Feel For You", Richard Marx' "Children of the Night", Stacey Q's "Give You All My Love" and Paula Abdul's "Opposites Attract", where he played the character MC Skat Kat and was an assistant choreographer. In 1985, he co-starred in "Stop the Madness", an anti-drug music video sponsored by the Reagan administration. He also appeared in such films as Bill & Ted's Bogus Journey (1991)—as a dancing robot—Naked Gun 33 1/3: The Final Insult (1994) and Dudley Do-Right (1999). He also appeared as Urkel-Bot in two episodes of the television show Family Matters: "Robo-Nerd" and "Robo-Nerd II". Chambers auditioned for New Monkees and advanced to the final round of auditions, but was ultimately not chosen.

Chambers was the announcer on the children's show Fun House from 1990 to 1991. He also appeared in Sugar Ray's 1997 video for the song "Fly" and break danced in the video.

Chambers has been invited as a speaker several times to USC's Thorton School of Music. He has also spoken at Santa Monica College, the University of Redlands, and gave a surprise visit to Spelman College in Georgia, U.S.

In 2014, Chambers was in talks to do a second sequel to the Breakin' franchise. As of 2020, Chambers is set to release a website, as well as music and YouTube pages, featuring his original footage from his early career.

== Filmography ==
Film
Year	Title	Role	Notes
1983	Breakin' 'N' Enterin'	Self	as Michael 'Boogaloo Shrimp' Chambers
1984	Breakin'	Turbo / Tony	as Michael 'Boogaloo Shrimp' Chambers
1984	Breakin' 2: Electric Boogaloo	Turbo	as Michael 'Boogaloo Shrimp' Chambers
1991	Bill & Ted's Bogus Journey	Good Robot Bill	as Michael 'Shrimp' Chambers
1994	Naked Gun 33 1/3: The Final Insult	Dancer	
1999	Dudley Do-Right	Dancer	
2018	Groove Street	Shrimp	
Television
Year	Title	Role	Notes
1990-1991	Fun House	Announcer	
1991–1994	Family Matters	Urkelbot / Emile	4 episodes
Music videos
Year	Title	Role	Notes
1983	Lionel Richie: All Night Long (All Night)	Break Dancer	
1984	Chaka Khan: I Feel for You	Michael Chambers	
1986	Stop the Madness	Michael Chambers	
1989	Paula Abdul: Knocked Out - Version 2	Skeleton Dancer	Uncredited
1989	Opposites Attract	MC Skat Kat	Choreographer, uncredited
