= Stop the Madness =

1985 anti-drug music video

Single by Various artists
- B-side: "Stop the Madness (Dance Version)"
- Released: January 17, 1986
- Genre: Dance music
- Length: 4:51
- Label: MCA
- Songwriters: Michael Stokes, Sharon Barnes, Lathan Armour, Tim Reid
- Producer: Michael Stokes

"Stop the Madness" is an anti-drug music video uniquely endorsed and supported by United States President Ronald Reagan and the Reagan administration in 1985. The video includes Claudia Wells, New Edition, Toni Basil, La Toya Jackson, Whitney Houston, David Hasselhoff, Kareem Abdul-Jabbar, Kim Fields, Herb Alpert, Arnold Schwarzenegger, Darrell Creswell, Tim Feehan, Casey Kasem and Boogaloo Shrimp from the Breakin' franchise. Perhaps the main star of the video was Ronald Reagan's wife, Nancy Reagan, whose main cause as First Lady was speaking out against drugs, and forming the "Just Say No" anti-drug association. Mrs. Reagan appeared twice in Stop the Madness.

The video also featured Stacy Keach, an actor arrested and jailed for possession of cocaine in 1984 immediately before the release of the video to American high schools.

The video features an appearance from Los Angeles Raiders defensive end Lyle Alzado, who would later admit to taking steroids and human growth hormones since 1969 in a July 8, 1991 article he wrote for Sports Illustrated. Alzado would die from cancer (brain lymphoma) in 1992 at the age of 43.

The video was created by Tim Reid, who was then co-starring on CBS' Simon & Simon as Lieutenant Marcel Proust "Downtown" Brown when the video was being made. (The stars of Simon & Simon, Jameson Parker, and Gerald McRaney also make an appearance in the video.), and Brian Dyak, founding president and CEO of the Entertainment Industries Council, with Dyak serving as the video's executive producer. The song was written by Michael Stokes. It premiered on January 17, 1986, on NBC's Friday Night Videos and was in regular airing for over six months.

The song featured in the video was released as a single by MCA Records. The dance version of the song was well received in Europe and played in dance clubs internationally, sparking special anti-drug campaigns in Germany, Italy, and other countries.

== CBS public service announcements ==
After the success of the movement, the CBS television network, working with Brian Dyak and EIC, adopted the Stop the Madness name for a long-running series of public service announcements addressing forms of drug abuse, addictions, alcoholism, and other social issues of concern to the general public. Brian Dyak further initiated the first network television campaign on HIV and AIDS as related to intravenous drug use, also with CBS. The current stars of CBS always spoke directly to the viewer in short but effective spots that launched the first 15-second PSAs. The campaign ran until the mid-1990s, whereupon it was succeeded by specialty campaigns such as The Arts Enrich Us All and currently, CBS Cares.
