= 1868 Philadelphia mayoral election =

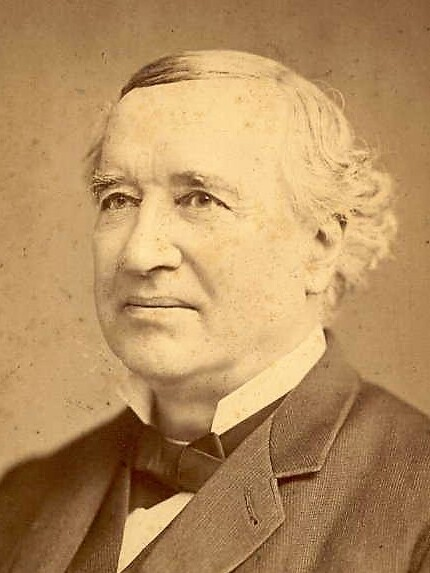

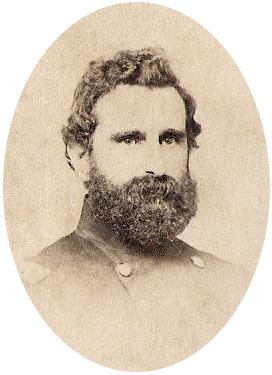
| Nominee | Daniel M. Fox | Hector Tyndale |
| Party | Democratic | Republican |
| Popular vote | 61,517 | 59,679 |
| Percentage | 50.76% | 49.24% |
Mayor before election
Morton McMichael
Republican
Elected mayor
Daniel M. Fox
Democratic

The 1868 Philadelphia mayoral election saw the election of Daniel M. Fox.

The margin of the election was close, and the results were contested and resolved in court.

== Results ==
1868 Philadelphia mayoral election
| Party | Candidate | Votes | % |
|---|---|---|---|
| Democratic | Daniel M. Fox | 61,517 | 50.76% |
| Republican | Hector Tyndale | 59,679 | 49.24% |
| Turnout | | 121,196 | |
