= Electric Boogaloo (song) =

1984 Ollie & Jerry song

Single by Ollie & Jerry

from the album Breakin' 2: Electric Boogaloo soundtrack
- Released: 1984
- Recorded: 1984
- Genre: Dance, pop
- Label: Polydor Records
- Songwriter(s): Ollie Brown, Jerry Knight
- Producer(s): Ollie Brown, Jerry Knight

Ollie & Jerry singles chronology
"Breakin'... There's No Stopping Us" (1984)	"Electric Boogaloo" (1984)

"Electric Boogaloo" is a dance-pop song by American music duo Ollie & Jerry. Released in late 1984 as the lead single from the soundtrack to the film Breakin' 2: Electric Boogaloo, the song reached number 45 on the R&B chart.

== Background ==
Detroit natives and prolific session musicians Ollie E. Brown and Jerry Knight first collaborated as the duo Ollie & Jerry on the soundtrack to the 1984 breakdancing-themed film Breakin'. The first track of that album, "Breakin'... There's No Stopping Us", was released as a single and reached number 9 on the Billboard Hot 100 in the summer of 1984.

Following the success of this record, Ollie & Jerry were asked to contribute music for the Breakin's sequel, Breakin' 2: Electric Boogaloo. The term "electric boogaloo" refers to a dance style of the same name. The duo recorded the track "Electric Boogaloo", which was released as a single.

Although the "Electric Boogaloo" single was less successful than its predecessor (not charting on Billboard''s Top 40), the Breakin' 2 soundtrack itself did reach number 25 on the Billboard R&B Albums chart and number 52 on the Billboard 200 albums chart.

== Personnel ==
- Ollie Brown - drums
- Jerry Knight - bass guitar

== Charts ==
Chart (1984)	Peak position
US Billboard R&B	45
