= The North American =

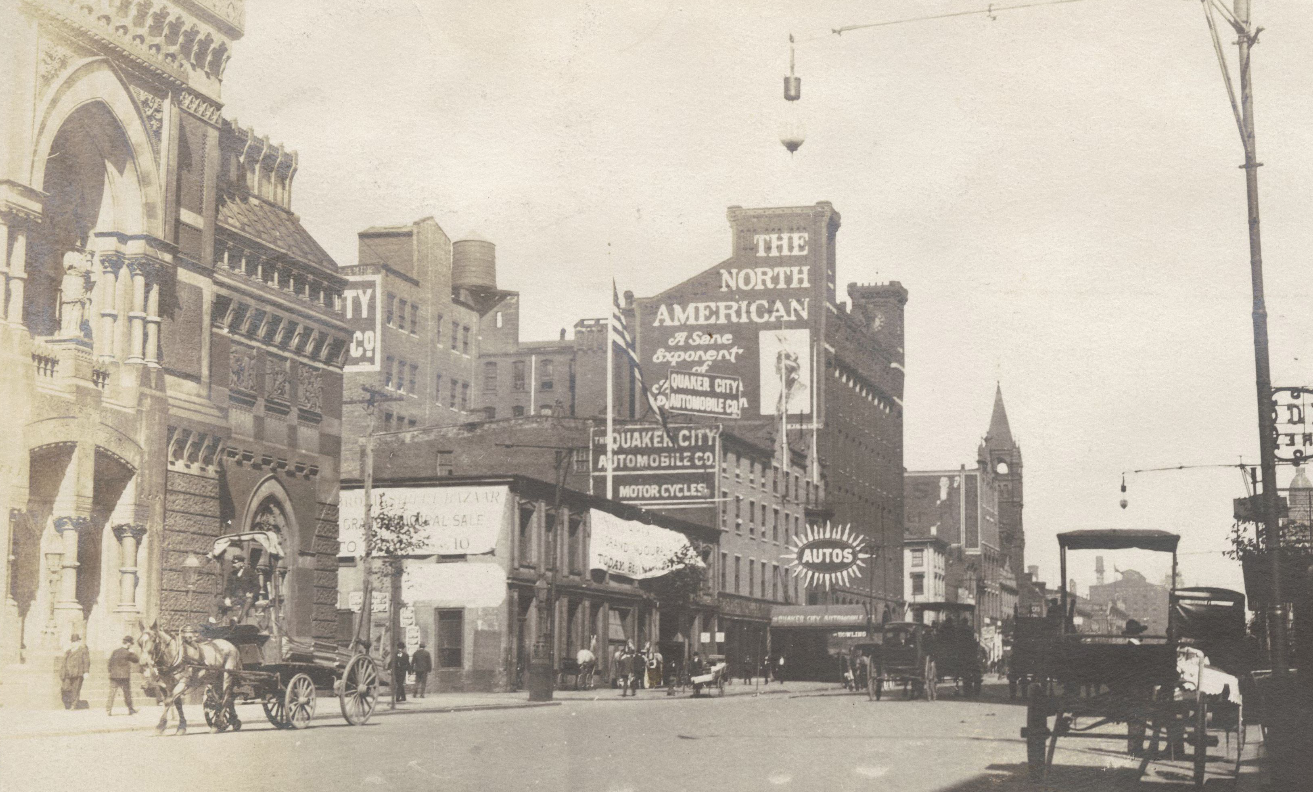
- Billboard advertising the North American near the intersection of Broad Street and Cherry Street
- Type: Daily newspaper
- Founded: March 26, 1839
- Ceased publication: May 1925
- Language: English
- Headquarters: Philadelphia, Pennsylvania, United States
- OCLC number: 11148690

The North American was an American newspaper published in Philadelphia, Pennsylvania. It was founded in 1839, though it could claim a lineage back to 1771, and published until 1925, when it was purchased by the owner of the rival Public Ledger.

== History ==
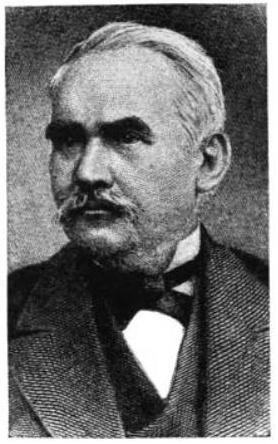
Morton McMichael, publisher of the North American from 1847 to 1879

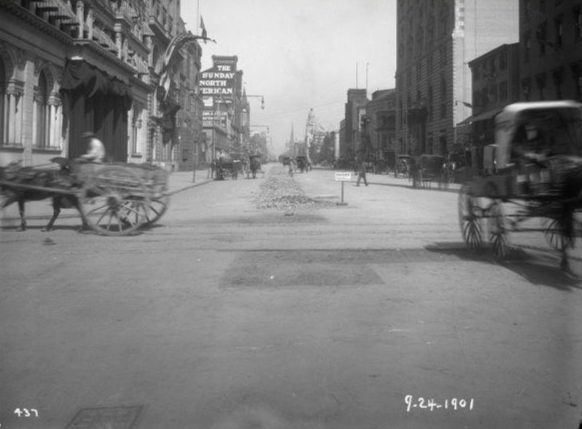
100 block of North Broad Street in Philadelphia, featuring an advertisement for The North American

The North American, a daily newspaper in Philadelphia, was first published on March 26, 1839, by S.C. Brace and T.R. Newbold. At the end of the year, the paper absorbed Zachariah Poulson's Poulson's American Daily Advertiser, the direct descendant of John Dunlap's Pennsylvania Packet, the country's first successful daily paper, and on January 1, 1840, publishing under a new name: The North American and Daily Advertiser. Later that year, the paper was acquired by C.G. Childs and J. Reese Fry, along with the Commercial Herald.

In October 1845, the paper was acquired by George R. Graham, well known as the publisher of Graham's Magazine, and Alexander Cummings, who went on to found the New York World. The "Daily Advertiser" suffix was also dropped.

Cummings soon departed over political differences, and Morton McMichael joined Graham as publisher in January 1847. At that point, it was an influential Whig newspaper. In July of that year, writer and playwright Robert Montgomery Bird was brought in as a one-third owner, and the paper was merged with the United States Gazette, another Whig paper in town and a descendant of the original Gazette of the United States first published in 1789. The paper was redubbed as the North American and United States Gazette.

Graham left the paper in 1848, and McMichael and Bird became the driving forces in making the paper a journalistic and financial success. After Bird died in 1854, McMichael continued as the sole owner until his death in 1879. The paper was a staunch supporter of Abraham Lincoln, as it developed to become a supporter of the Republican party.

The "United States Gazette" suffix was dropped from the paper's name in 1876. McMichael's two sons assumed control of the paper in his final years, his son Clayton assuming chief editorial duties.

In 1899, the paper was acquired by Thomas B. Wanamaker, son of John Wanamaker. In 1925, Cyrus Curtis, owner of the Public Ledger, acquired the North American from Thomas B. Wanamaker's estate as part of his bid to grow the Ledger by shutting down some of its competitors. The Ledger adopted the official title Public Ledger and North American (with the latter in small font, of course), until late 1927.

== See also ==
- North American Building
