= The Lockers =

1970s dance group

The Lockers (originally named The Campbell Lockers) was a dance group formed by Toni Basil and Don "Campbellock" Campbell in 1971. Active throughout the 1970s, they were pioneers of street dance. Campbell is the founder of the locking dance style, and originally, locking was called The Campbellock—a style that was based on the dance and song that Campbell created. Basil met Campbell at a club in 1971 and together they formed The Lockers as a dance group. Basil, who became Campbell's girlfriend, also served as The Lockers' manager, and was responsible for staging the act. All the dancers contributed steps and choreography with their unique and individual styles. By 1975 they were "dancing their way to stardom" on their own. Individual members' contributions (as soloist performers) to the dance style and group image coupled with their unique presentation in staging and concept broke down many barriers. It has been said on the reality dance competition So You Think You Can Dance that "The Lockers' emergence on the dance scene changed the face of dance not only for street dancers but for dance in general and has made street dance a true American art form."

== Performances ==
Some of the Lockers' television appearances included Saturday Night Live, Soul Train, Carol Burnett, The Tonight Show Starring Johnny Carson, the ABC sitcom What's Happening!! and The Midnight Special (Ohio Players performance). They performed live on stage at Radio City Music Hall, Carnegie Hall, Disneyland, The MGM Grand Las Vegas, Harrah's Reno, and Harrah's Lake Tahoe. The group was animated for their appearance in the 1982 film Hey Good Lookin' directed by Ralph Bakshi. They appeared in commercials for Schlitz Malt Liquor and Billy Preston's "Nothing From Nothing".

== Members ==
=== 1973–1976 lineup ===
- Don "Campbellock" Campbell (1951–2020), founding member
- Toni Basil (born 1943), founding member
- Fred Berry (1951–2003), founding member
- Greg "Campbellock Jr" Pope (1952–2010)
- Adolfo "Shabba Doo" Quiñones (1955–2020), founding member
- Bill "Slim the Robot" Williams (born 1952), founding member
- Leo "Fluky Luke" Williamson, founding member

In 1976, Berry and Basil left the group amicably. The group also featured actor Mykelti Williamson (born 1957) as an alternate member.

== Post-Lockers ==
After The Lockers disbanded, group members continued to find success individually. Both Don Campbell and Toni Basil have received the "Living Legend of Hip Hop" award from Hip Hop International.

Basil, who already had a successful career as a choreographer and actress prior to the Lockers, would go on to achieve pop music success with the Grammy-nominated single "Mickey."

Adolfo Quiñones starred as Ozone in the street dance films Breakin' and Breakin' 2: Electric Boogaloo. He also choreographed Madonna's "Who's That Girl" tour. His awards include the "Lifetime Achievement Award" for outstanding contributions to hip-hop from "The Carnival: Choreographer's Ball" and the Drama Critic's Circle Award for Best Choreography for the musical Standup Tragedy.

Fred Berry would later find greater fame in the role of Rerun on the ABC sitcom What's Happening!! One episode featured a performance by The Lockers (except for Basil). Berry also makes a cameo appearance in Basil's "Shoppin' from A to Z" video.

As of December 2011 Leo "Fluky Luke" Williamson was attending classes with Ultimate Medical Academy, Tampa, Florida.
