= Carol Lynn Townes =

American singer

Carol Lynn Townes is an American soul singer from Warrenton, North Carolina.

== Career ==
Hailing from a family of gospel singers, she made her debut singing gospel at age three. She moved to New York in the early 1970s, joining a male soul group called Fifth Avenue. The group consisted of prominent jingle singers. With Townes as lead singer, the group recorded the single, "Wheeler Dealer", for Buddha Records, and followed with an album on RCA Records in 1976. But it was not until nearly a decade later that Townes achieved commercial success.

Signed to Polydor as a solo artist, she recorded a cover version of Alton McClain & Destiny's "99 ½" for the Breakin' soundtrack in 1984. This became a top 10 dance club hit and made number 22 on the US Billboard R&B chart, and number 77 on the Billboard Hot 100. It peaked at number 47 in the UK Singles Chart in August 1984. She then recorded "Believe in the Beat" for the follow-up film, Breakin' 2: Electric Boogaloo, in which she appeared at the end, performing the song. This track reached number 56 in the UK and number 65 in Australia. This led to her own solo album, Satisfaction Guaranteed. She then recorded a second album, Try Me Out, released in 1988. This was followed by the 12-inch single "What I Wouldn't Do" on Easy Street in 1989, and a dance version of The Grass Roots' hit "Midnight Confessions" on Life Line in 1993.

== Discography ==
=== Albums ===
Year	Title	Label
1976	Carol Townes and Fifth Avenue	Sixth Avenue
1985	Satisfaction Guaranteed	Polydor
1988	Try Me Out	Polydor

=== Singles ===
Year	Title	Peak chart positions				
Year	Title	US	US R&B	US Dance	UK	AUS
1975	"Wheeler Dealer" (with Fifth Avenue)	—	—	—	—	—
1984	"99 ½"	77	22	9	47	—
1984	"Believe in the Beat"	109	65	25	56	65
1985	"I Freak for You"	106	—	28	—	—
1988	"You Keep Running Back"	—	—	—	—	—
1989	"What Wouldn't I Do"	—	—	—	—	—
1993	"Midnight Confession"	—	—	—	—	—
"—" denotes releases that did not chart or were not released in that territory.
