= Ollie & Jerry =

American dance-pop duo

- Origin: Los Angeles, California, U.S.
- Genres: Dance-pop; electro; synth-pop; R&B; Latin freestyle
- Years active: 1984–1985
- Labels: Polydor; PolyGram
- Past members: Ollie E. Brown; Jerry Knight

Ollie & Jerry was an American dance-pop duo active in the 1980s, consisting of drummer Ollie E. Brown and R&B singer/bassist Jerry Knight.

Despite releasing no studio albums under their own name, the duo is still widely known for its hit single "Breakin'... There's No Stopping Us", a dance-influenced track that became a top-10 hit in the United States and the United Kingdom, and it was featured as the theme song of the film Breakin' and released on its accompanying soundtrack. However, the group disbanded in mid-1985 after the release of their second single "Electric Boogaloo". As a result, "Electric Boogaloo" failed to repeat the success of "Breakin'..." and the duo is widely considered a one-hit wonder.

== History ==
Ollie Brown and Jerry Knight had previously worked together as session musicians, with Knight having also been a member of R&B group Raydio, to whose albums Brown had frequently contributed as a session drummer. The two formed Ollie & Jerry in Los Angeles in 1984, signing to Polydor Records. The duo recorded the song "Breakin'... There's No Stopping Us" as the title theme to the 1984 film Breakin', and released as the first single from the film's soundtrack album. The single became a hit, peaking at No. 5 on the UK Singles Chart and at No. 9 on the Billboard Hot 100 in 1984. The group then did some promotion for the song, performing on the syndicated television program Soul Train in the midst of the success of the song. The Breakin' soundtrack went on to peak at No. 8 on the US Billboard 200 albums chart.

The following year, the duo released the single "Electric Boogaloo", the title theme of the Breakin' sequel Breakin' 2: Electric Boogaloo. The single did fairly well on the UK Singles Chart, peaking at No. 57 on the chart. However, the song failed to chart on the Billboard Hot 100; it did, however, find some minor success on the Billboard Hot R&B/Hip-Hop Songs and Hot Dance Club Play charts, peaking at the positions of No. 45 and No. 43 respectively. After the song's release, the duo split in mid-1985.

== Discography ==
=== Singles ===
Year	Single	Peak chart positions							
Year	Single	US Hot 100	US R&B	US Dance	UK	NL	BEL	NZ	AUS
1984	"Breakin'... There's No Stopping Us"	9	3	1	5	27	25	7	25
1985	"Electric Boogaloo"	—	45	43	57	—	—	—	—
