= Louis Antoine Godey =

American editor and publisher (1804-1878)

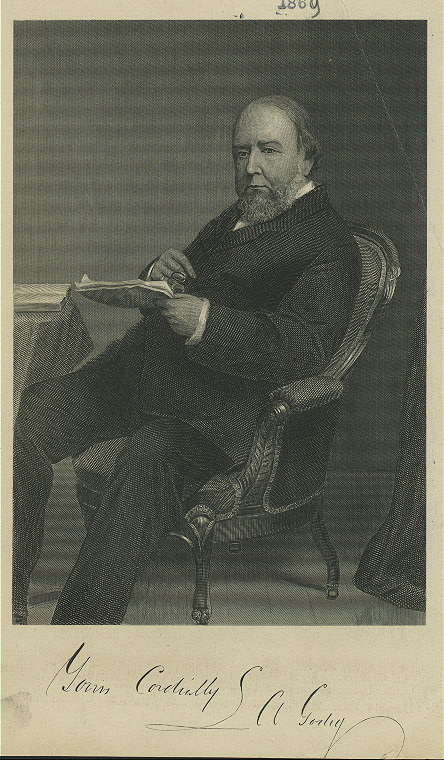
- Louis A. Godey by Frederick Gutekunst
- Born: June 6, 1804; New York, U.S.
- Died: November 29, 1878 (aged 74); Philadelphia, Pennsylvania, U.S.
- Resting place: Laurel Hill Cemetery, Philadelphia, Pennsylvania, U.S.
- Occupations: Newspaper editor, women's fashion magazine publisher

Louis Antoine Godey (June 6, 1804 – November 29, 1878) was an American editor and publisher. He was the founder of Godey's Lady's Book in 1837, the first successful American women's fashion magazine.

== Biography ==
Godey was born to Louis and Margaret Godey in New York City. His parents were immigrants from Sens, France, who fled during the French Revolution. His family was poor and he had no formal schooling, but he was self-educated. At age 15, he took a job as a newspaper boy in New York. Several years later, he moved to Philadelphia and became an editor for the Daily Chronicle. In 1830, he published the first edition of the Lady's Book, composed of reprinted articles and illustrations from British magazines. In 1837, Godey merged Lady's Book with Ladies' Magazine, the oldest publication of its type, published out of Boston. Godey married Maria Duke in 1833 and had five children.

In 1836, Godey's Publishing House was the first American publisher of the seafaring novels of Frederick Marryat. Godey also partnered with fellow publisher Morton McMichael and others to publish the Saturday News, a weekly magazine that focused on families.

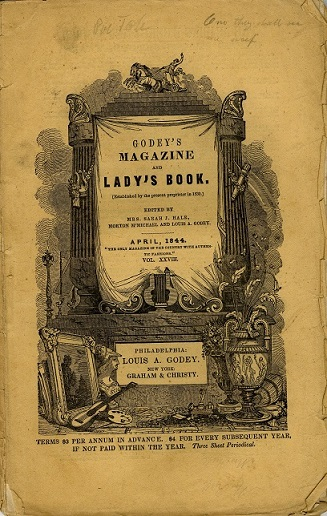
Godey's Lady's Book April 1844

Godey wanted to provide more content developed by American authors and hired Sarah Josepha Hale to be editor of Godey's Lady's Book in 1837. She remained the editor until her retirement in 1877. The magazine became extremely popular, becoming America's highest circulated magazine in the 1840s and reaching over 150,000 subscribers by 1858. Many famous authors were published in Godey's Lady's Book, including Nathaniel Hawthorne, Ralph Waldo Emerson, Edgar Allan Poe, Henry Wadsworth Longfellow, and Harriet Beecher Stowe.

Godey implemented a service where readers could order copies of engravings published in the magazine and other items. This was a precursor to mail order catalogs that became popular later in the 19th century. He also developed programs to offer "premiums" or gifts to those who subscribed or renewed their subscriptions. He also innovated and offered reduced subscription rates to groups that pooled their money and purchased multiple copies of the magazine. Godey copyrighted each issue of Godey's Lady's Book starting in 1845, making it one of the first magazines in America to do so.

Godey published two other magazines, The Young People’s Book (1841) and Lady’s Musical Library (1842), with less successful results.

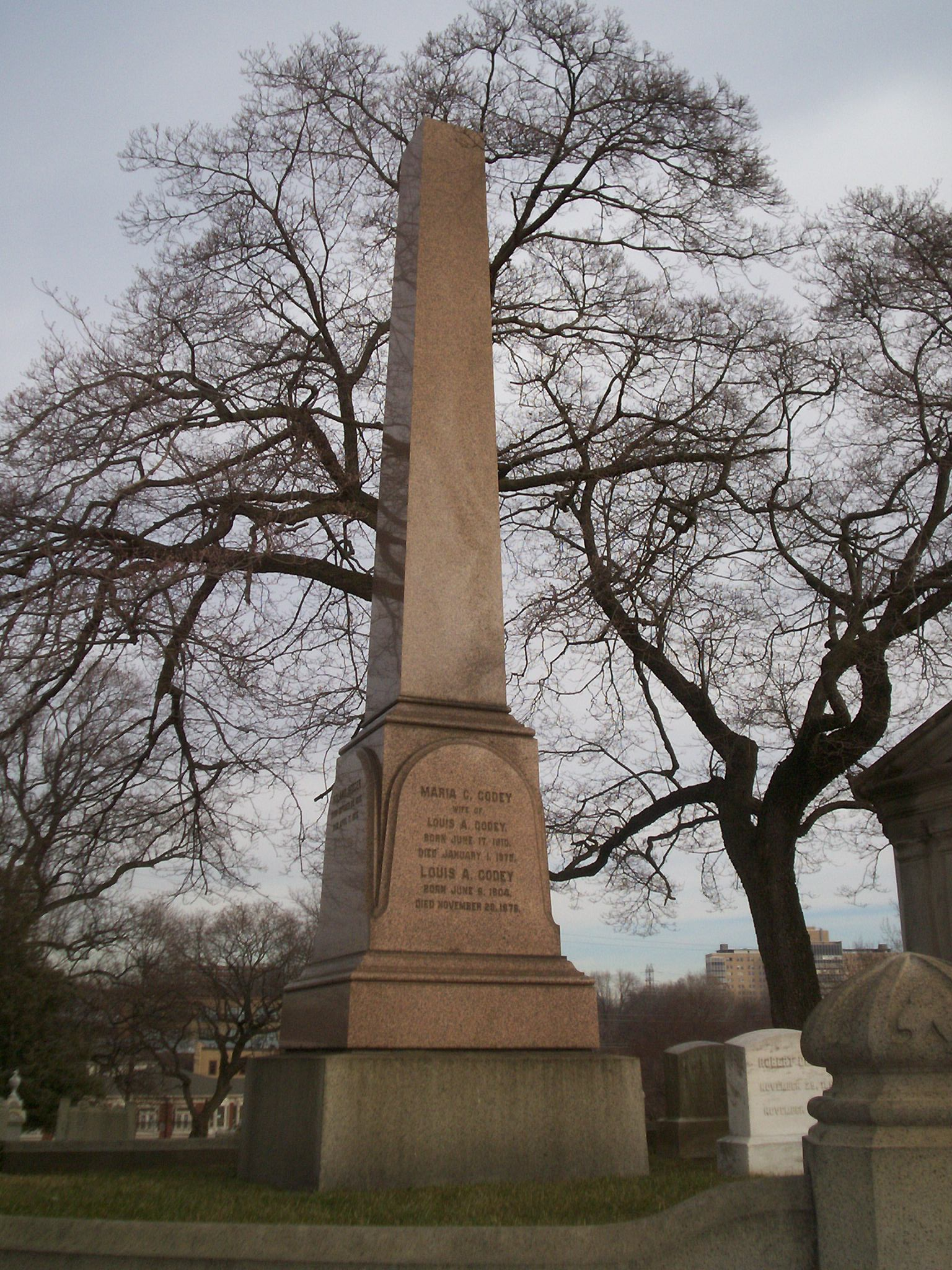
Memorial for Louis A. Godey and his wife at Laurel Hill Cemetery, Philadelphia.

In the 1870s, he retired to St. Augustine, Florida, but returned to Philadelphia where he died in 1878. At the time of his death, his fortune was estimated at $1 million, approximately $26 million today. He and his wife are buried at Laurel Hill Cemetery in Philadelphia.

== Sources ==
- Oberholtzer, Ellis Paxson (1906). The Literary History of Philadelphia. George W. Jacobs & Co.
