= Pennsylvania Prison Society =

Nonprofit organization in the United States

Coordinates: 39.9571°N 75.1625°W

The Pennsylvania Prison Society is an advocacy group that supports prisoners, formerly incarcerated individuals and their families. It is headquartered in Philadelphia, Pennsylvania.

== History ==
It was founded in 1787 as the Philadelphia Society for Alleviating the Miseries of Public Prisons, a name which it retained for 100 years. Among its founders were Dr. Benjamin Rush, John Swanwick, John Morrison, Thomas Morrison, Tench Coxe, Zachariah Poulson, Thomas Lloyd, Joseph Moore, William Roger, John Haighn, James Whitehall, Richard Wells, Thomas Wistar, Jacob Shoemaker, Isaac Parrish, William Lane, Thomas Rogers, Samuel Griffiths, Francis Baily, Joseph James, Charles Marshall, John Olden, Caleb Lownes, Thomas Parkinson, John Morris, John Baker, Dr. George Duffield, James Reynolds, Benjamin Wynkoop, George Krebs, Dr. William White, Dr. Henry Helmuth, Dr. John Jones, Dr. William Shippen, Dr. Gerardus Clarkson, Jonathan Penrose, and Lawrence Sickle. William White served as president of the organization for most of its early years.

In 1845, the Prison Society established the Journal of Prison Discipline and Philanthropy, which has been published since 1921 as The Prison Journal (ISSN 0032-8855 [print]).

The Society's main office is located at 230 S. Broad Street Suite 605, Philadelphia, Pennsylvania, 19102. In addition, there are 43 chapters of the Pennsylvania Prison Society running Official Visitor programs throughout the state.

== Structure and funding ==
The Pennsylvania Prison Society is a 501(c)(3) organization. In 2023, it reported total revenue of $1,322,862 and total assets of $3,671,440.
