= Fun House (American game show) =

Children's television game show, 1988–1991

- Created by: Bob Synes
- Presented by: J. D. Roth
- Announcer: John "Tiny" Hurley (Syndication); Michael "Boogaloo Shrimp" Chambers (FOX)
- Country of origin: United States
- Original language: English
- No. of seasons: 3
- No. of episodes: 375 (351 on syndication; 24 on Fox)

Production
- Production locations: Hollywood Center Studios; Hollywood, California
- Running time: approx. 22 minutes
- Production companies: Stone Television (1988–1990); Stone Stanley Productions (1990–1991); Lorimar-Telepictures (1988–1989); Lorimar Television (1989–1990); Telepictures Productions (1990–1991); Warner Bros. Television (1989–1991)

Original release
- Network: Syndication (1988–1990); Fox (1990–1991)
- Release: September 5, 1988 – April 13, 1991

Related
- Fun House

Fun House is an American children's television game show that aired from September 5, 1988 to April 13, 1991. The first two seasons aired in daily syndication, with the Fox network picking it up and renaming it Fox's Fun House for its third and final season.

The format of Fun House was similar to that of Nickelodeon game show Double Dare, which was being produced for syndication at the time and which became a primary competitor for ratings. Two teams of children answered questions and played messy games, competing for a chance to run an obstacle course and win cash and prizes. The course was modeled after the funhouse attractions seen in carnivals and amusement parks, from which the series took its title.

The show was hosted for its entire run by J. D. Roth. John "Tiny" Hurley was the original announcer and appeared on the first two seasons in syndication. Michael "Boogaloo Shrimp" Chambers, a famous breakdancer-turned-actor, replaced him when the show moved to Fox and took on the name "MC Mike". Identical twin sisters Jacqueline and Samantha Forrest ("Jackie" and "Sammi", respectively) served as the show's cheerleaders.

The show was created by Bob Synes, a veteran producer of game shows who previously worked on Let's Make a Deal and had created several other programs of his own, with Synes and Scott A. Stone serving as executive producers.

Fun House was initially a co-production of Stone Television and Lorimar-Telepictures, the latter of which took on the role of distributor. From the second season onward, Lorimar Television became the co-producer and Warner Bros. Domestic Television Distribution the syndicator. After Bob Synes died in 1990, Scott Stone replaced him with David G. Stanley and his production company then took on the name of Stone Stanley Productions, a name which it kept until the company dissolved.

British Knights sponsored the show during its first two seasons, replaced by LA Gear for the third. Everyone appearing onstage wore a pair of the sponsoring company's shoes.

A year after the show premiered, a spinoff series called College Mad House was created. Premiering in 1989 (the same year as the British version that outlasted the American one by 8 years) and running in weekly syndication for one season, it was hosted by Greg Kinnear and featured teams of college students from various universities around the United States competing against each other.

Stunt props from the show were used in a 1989 episode of Perfect Strangers titled "Games People Play".

== Gameplay ==
Two new teams, consisting of one boy and girl apiece, competed on each episode. One team wore gold uniforms and was cheered by Jackie, while the other wore red and was supported by Sammi.

=== Stunt rounds ===
Three stunts/games were played on each episode. Contestants had to undertake challenges such as answering questions, finding requested items, and assembling devices, and frequently ended up covered in disgusting materials such as slime or garbage. Some stunts were races against time or to be the first to complete an objective, while in others each team took turns; in those instances, Roth tossed a giant coin to determine which team would start.

Each stunt awarded 25 points to the winner; if a stunt ended in a tie, both teams scored. One stunt was played with the boys, one with the girls, and the last with both teammates working together. After each stunt, play moved back to the podium where Roth would ask a multiple-choice trivia question to the teammates who had not participated or, in the case of the team stunt, to one designated member from each team. The first contestant to buzz in and answer correctly scored 25 points; during the third season, that team also earned the right to hit their opponents in the face with a pie.

=== Grand Prix race ===
The Grand Prix race was played as the fourth and final round and involved both teams racing two laps around a track that circled the studio, trading lanes after the first lap.

Two different formats were commonly used. One involved both teammates performing tasks based on the theme of the day's race, such as riding in a comically oversized vehicle while being pushed by the other teammate, and requiring the teammates to switch roles after the first lap. The other was a foot race, with each teammate taking one lap.

Small challenges were usually set up around the track that each team had to complete during the run, such as gathering and carrying items, running through tires, or squirting targets with a seltzer bottle. Roth signaled the start and finish of the race with the green and checkered flags used in motor racing, respectively.

In addition to completing the objectives during the race, the teams had a chance to increase their score by collecting tokens from stations alongside the track. One white token and one blue token were available at each station, worth 10 and 25 points respectively. During season two, a station called the Token Bank was added to each lane for the second lap, containing pre-packaged bundles of tokens worth up to 200 points; a team could take one bundle during this lap.

Each team was given a bag to hold collected tokens, which had to be worn around the neck of the running/riding member and passed off after the first lap. Any tokens that fell on the floor became invalid and could not be picked up. In order for tokens to count toward a team's score, they had to be either in the bag or aboard the vehicle (when applicable) before the end of the race.

The team that won the race received 25 points, with a tie resulting both teams receiving the points. The tokens were counted starting with the trailing team. The team with the most points after the count stopped won the game and the right to enter the Fun House, with the other team receiving consolation gifts.

=== The Fun House ===
The Fun House was a large playing area that contained several rooms and obstacles for the team members to traverse, in the same manner as in the amusement park attraction of the same name. A total of 16 oversized price tags were scattered throughout the rooms. Six were red, representing different prizes, and could be hidden or visible; the other 10 were green, awarding cash amounts from $50 to $300, and were always visible. Any room containing a prize tag was marked with a placard indicating the prize.

The team had two minutes to collect as many tags as possible, but only one member could be in the Fun House at any given time. After collecting three tags, he/she returned to the entrance and his/her teammate started into the Fun House. The round continued until time ran out or all 16 tags had been collected, whichever occurred first. If an obstacle malfunctioned and made progress difficult or impossible, the team was granted extra time (usually 20–30 seconds) at the end of the run.

When the show moved to Fox for season three, a large alarm clock called the Glop Clock was hidden in the Fun House. Finding it awarded a 15-second bonus, to be used once the original two minutes were up.

Both teammates won all cash and prizes collected by either of them, including any that a runner was holding if time ran out while he/she was inside the Fun House. In addition, one tag was designated as the day's "Power Prize" and secretly revealed as such to the audience and home viewers before the round began. If either teammate picked up this tag, both of them won a bonus vacation trip.

Prize totals on the show were usually much higher than were available on other children's game shows of the time such as Double Dare or Finders Keepers, the latter of which was also produced by Nickelodeon, also launched in syndication in 1988, and taped in the same studio complex as Fun House. A team on either of those two shows could usually walk away with approximately $2,000–$3,000 in cash and prizes. Fun House, on the other hand, offered significantly higher stakes; the prizes in the Fun House had a combined value that approached and usually exceeded $10,000, and it was not entirely uncommon to see a team walk away with over $3,000, $4,000, or even higher winnings.

== College Mad House ==
College Mad House was a spinoff of Fun House that featured two teams of young adults representing various colleges and universities, with the content intended for a more mature audience. The show was aired on weekends in syndication and was hosted by Greg Kinnear, with Beau Weaver as the announcer.

As before, two teams competed. This time, there were four members of the team instead of two. Like on Fun House, there was an equal distribution of males and females.

This version featured much more risqué content and stunts than the children's version, often involving crude college gross-out humor and games that required lewd bodily movements among the contestants.

Stunts were reworked to accommodate the larger teams. The first stunt featured the men, the second featured the women, and the third featured all eight contestants. Scoring remained the same.

The fourth round was the "College Mad House Finals", a ninety-second speed round of general knowledge questions. The two teams would stand in line behind the podium and each member of the team had a pie. Buzzing in with a correct answer won the team 25 points and the contestant got to hit the opponent with his/her pie. After two contestants played, they moved to the end of the line and the next two moved up to face each other. Play continued in this manner until time ran out, and the team in the lead won the game. The losing team receives $500 for their university and a parting gift. If the teams were tied, one more question was played with the next two contestants in line. The tiebreaker was an all-or-nothing question, as buzzing in with a wrong answer resulted in an automatic loss. This game mechanic, minus the pies, was later used on the Stone-Stanley game show Shop 'Til You Drop, which premiered a year after the show went off the air.

The winning team then got to run through the Mad House, which was laid out in the same manner as the Fun House, except with rooms that were more centered on college life than children. One at a time, the winning team would run through the Mad House trying to collect as many of the prize tags and cash tags as possible. A contestant was not limited as to how many tags they could grab, but after thirty seconds elapsed that contestant had to freeze wherever they were, and the next contestant in line was sent into the Mad House. Play continued until all four team members had taken their turn or until all of the tags had been found. There was no Power Prize in the Mad House; instead, the bonus vacation was awarded if the team managed to "clean house" by getting all of the tags before the last teammate into the Mad House ran out of time.

The members of the losing team were also allowed into the Mad House, and used various methods in an attempt to slow down the winning team so that they would not have a clean house.

== Merchandise ==
=== Board game ===
Fun House
- Players: 2 to 3
- Setup time: < 3 minutes
- Playing time: < 60 minutes
- Chance: Mild (mostly skill)
- Age range: 3 and up
- Skills: Reading; Counting; Answering questions

Fun House was a board game loosely based on the American children's game show of the same name. It was released in 1988. The game utilized dice, markers, and a board game that plays like a real fun house. It was given as a consolation prize on the show.

=== Travel game ===
Tiger Electronics (1989)

A Klix Pocket Travel Game was released in 1989.

=== Video and computer games ===
Hi Tech Expressions (1989, 1991)

Games released from the Commodore 64 & MS-DOS were released in 1989, while a version for the NES was released in 1991.

=== Exercise videos ===
Warner Home Video (1990)

In 1990, two exercise videos were released under the Fun House Fitness collection hosted by Jane Fonda and J. D. Roth respectively. The first one was called The Swamp Stomp for kids ages 3–7, while the second and final line of exercise videos was called The Fun House Funk for kids ages 7 and up. It was re-issued as part of the Jane Fonda Collection DVD compilation in 2005.
