= 1860 Philadelphia mayoral election =

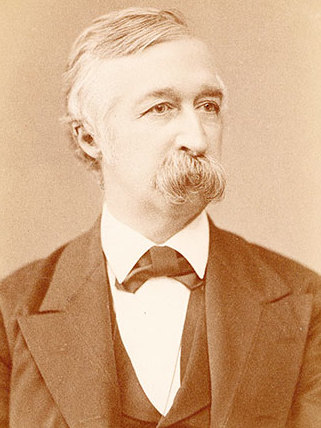

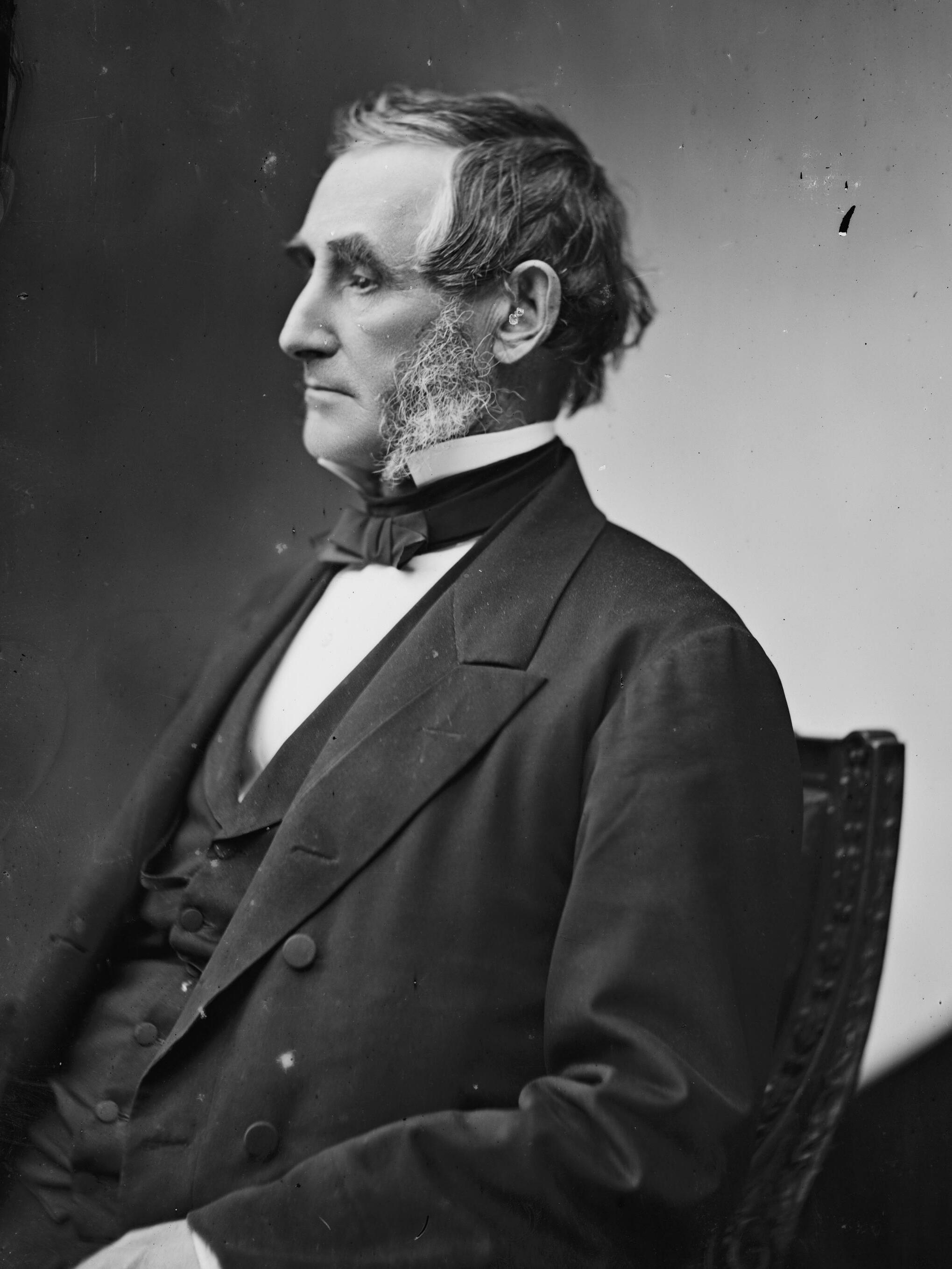
Nominee	Alexander Henry	John Robbins
Party	Republican	Democratic
Popular vote	36,658	35,776
Percentage	50.61%	49.39%
Mayor before election
Alexander Henry
People's Party
Elected mayor
Alexander Henry
Republican

The 1860 Philadelphia mayoral election saw the reelection of Alexander Henry.

This was the first Philadelphia mayoral election won by the then-young Republican Party under its current name. Prior to this election, the party was known as the People's Party in Pennsylvania.

== Results ==
1860 Philadelphia mayoral election
Party	Candidate	Votes	%
Republican	Alexander Henry (incumbent)	36,658	50.61%
Democratic	John Robbins	35,776	49.39%
Turnout		72,434	
