= Shabba Doo =

American actor and dancer (1955–2020)

- Shabba Doo circa 1984
- Born: Adolfo Quiñones; May 11, 1955; Chicago, Illinois, U.S.
- Died: December 29, 2020 (aged 65); Los Angeles, California, U.S.
- Other name: Adolfo "Shabba Doo" Quiñones
- Occupations: Actor; dancer; choreographer
- Years active: 1975–2020
- Known for: Orlando "Ozone" – Breakin', Breakin' 2: Electric Boogaloo
- Spouses: Gwendolyn Powell (m. 1976; div. 1982) Lela Rochon (m. 1982; div. 1987)
- Children: 2

Adolfo Quiñones (May 11, 1955 – December 29, 2020), known professionally as Shabba Doo, was an American actor, break dancer, and choreographer. Of African American and Puerto Rican descent, Quiñones was born and raised in Chicago, Illinois. In the 1970s his family moved to Los Angeles, where he became interested in dancing and began performing in nightclubs. He adopted the pseudonym Shabba Doo and joined the dance group The Lockers, who were responsible for popularizing the locking style of street dance.

In 1984, Quiñones played one of the lead characters in the breakdancing-themed musical film Breakin',. The film was successful at the box-office, grossing $38,682,707 domestically, and spawned a sequel Breakin' 2: Electric Boogaloo. Quiñones continued acting in films and television.

Throughout his career, Quiñones performed and choreographed dance for musical acts such as Lionel Richie, Madonna, Luther Vandross, Three Six Mafia, and Chaka Khan.

== Early life and education ==
Quiñones was born and raised in Chicago, Illinois, United States; His father, Adolfo, had been born in Puerto Rico and became a salesman and a laborer. His mother, a Black American Ruth (McDaniel) Quiñones, was an accountant whose family had moved from Mississippi to Chicago during the Great Migration. His mother raised him as a single parent from the age of three. He had a younger sister, Fawn Quiñones, who was also a dancer, and frequently featured on the musical variety television program Soul Train. Quiñones was raised in the Cabrini–Green housing complex in the city's Near North Side. For high school, Quiñones attended Cooley Vocational High School and Robert A. Waller High School (now known as Lincoln Park High School). In the 1970s, his family moved to the Los Angeles area. He began dancing in clubs around Crenshaw Boulevard and at venues like Radiotron, near MacArthur Park. Break-dance culture was growing at these establishments, and he dueled nightly in them with rivals on the dance floor. He started calling himself Sir Lance-a-Lock, which then became Shabba-Dabba-Do-Bop, which was finally shortened to Shabba-Doo.

== Career ==
As a member of The Original Lockers along with Don "Campbellock" Campbell, Fred "Rerun" Berry and Toni Basil, Quiñones became one of the innovators of the dance style commonly known as locking.

In 1980. Quiñones acted on stage in David Winters's rock musical Goosebumps.

In May 1984, Joel Silberg's breakdancing-themed musical film Breakin' opened in cinemas, where Quiñones was cast as a lead playing Ozone. The film opened at number one in the box office, earning $6,047,686. and eventually grossed $38,682,707 in the domestic box office, making it the eighteenth highest-grossing film of 1984.

In December, 1984, Breakin' 2: Electric Boogaloo premiered, directed by Sam Firstenberg with Quiñones returning as Ozone. The film grossed $15.1 million in the United States and Canada.

Also in 1984, he danced in Chaka Khan's music video "I feel for you"

In 1987, Quiñones was a primary dancer and main choreographer for singer Madonna's Who's That Girl? Tour in 1987. He would later choreograph for other singers, such as Lionel Richie and Michael Jackson.

In 1989, Quiñones appeared in the film Tango & Cash.

In 1990, Quiñones acted in Deadly Dancer and Lambada.

Quiñones also appeared in Rave - Dancing to a Different Beat, which he also directed. He made guest appearances on TV shows including The Super Mario Bros. Super Show!, Married... with Children, Miami Vice, What's Happening!!, Saturday Night Live and Lawrence Leung's Choose Your Own Adventure. Quiñones was writing A Breakin’ Uprising.

He served as choreographer for Jamie Kennedy's MTV sitcom, Blowin' Up. He choreographed Three Six Mafia's performance at the 78th Academy Awards; the group won the Oscar for best original song for "It's Hard out Here for a Pimp".

== Personal life and death ==
Quiñones was married twice and had two children. His first marriage was to Gwendolyn Powell from 1976 until 1982. After divorcing Powell, Quiñones married actress Lela Rochon in 1982. Quiñones and Rochon were married until 1987. He died at his home from arteriosclerotic cardiovascular disease on December 29, 2020, at age 65.

== Filmography ==
Film
Year	Title	Role	Notes
1978	Disco Fever	Dancer at Jet	
1980	Xanadu	Xanadu Dancer	Uncredited
1984	Breakin'	Orlando "Ozone" Barco	
1984	Breakin' 2: Electric Boogaloo	Orlando "Ozone" Barco	
1989	Tango & Cash	Dancer	
1990	Lambada	Ramone	
1993	Rave, Dancing to a Different Beat	Unknown	Director & co-writer
1995	Steel Frontier	Deacon	
Television
Year	Title	Role	Notes
1976	What's Happening!!	Rocket Dancer	Episode: "My Three Tons"
1980	The Big Show	Himself	1 episode
1985	Miami Vice	Pepe	Episode: "The Maze"
1985	Kids Incorporated	The Genie	Episode: "A Lad and His Lamp"
1989	The Super Mario Bros. Super Show!	Himself	Episode: "Dance"
1990	Married... with Children	Cecil	Episode: "Rock and Roll Girl"
1991	The Sitter	Nick	TV movie

== See also ==
- List of dancers
