= 1862 Philadelphia mayoral election =

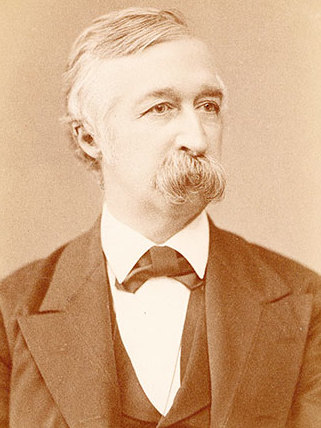

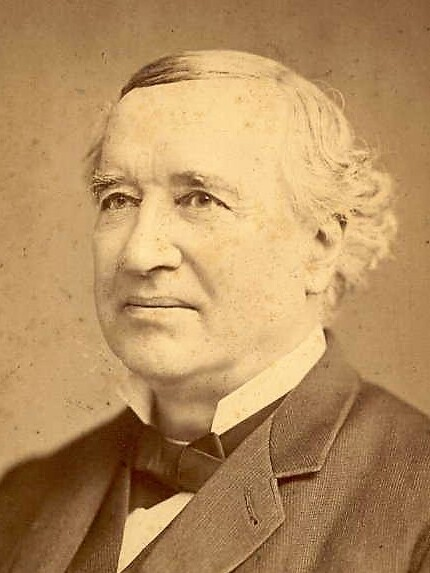
Nominee	Alexander Henry	Daniel M. Fox
Party	Republican	Democratic
Popular vote	37,219	31,558
Percentage	54.12%	45.88%
Mayor before election
Alexander Henry
Republican
Elected mayor
Alexander Henry
Republican

The 1862 Philadelphia mayoral election saw the reelection of Alexander Henry to a third consecutive term. It was the first Philadelphia mayoral election to a three-year term, as previous elections since 1854 had been for two-year terms.

== Results ==
1862 Philadelphia mayoral election
Party	Candidate	Votes	%
Republican	Alexander Henry (incumbent)	37,219	54.12
Democratic	Daniel M. Fox	31,558	45.88
Turnout		78,777	
