= 1858 Philadelphia mayoral election =

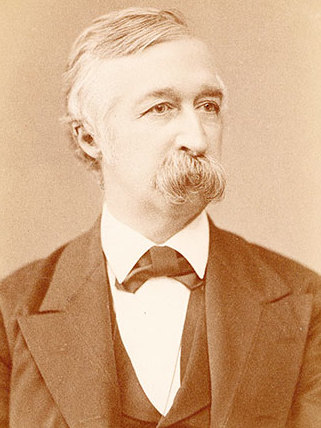

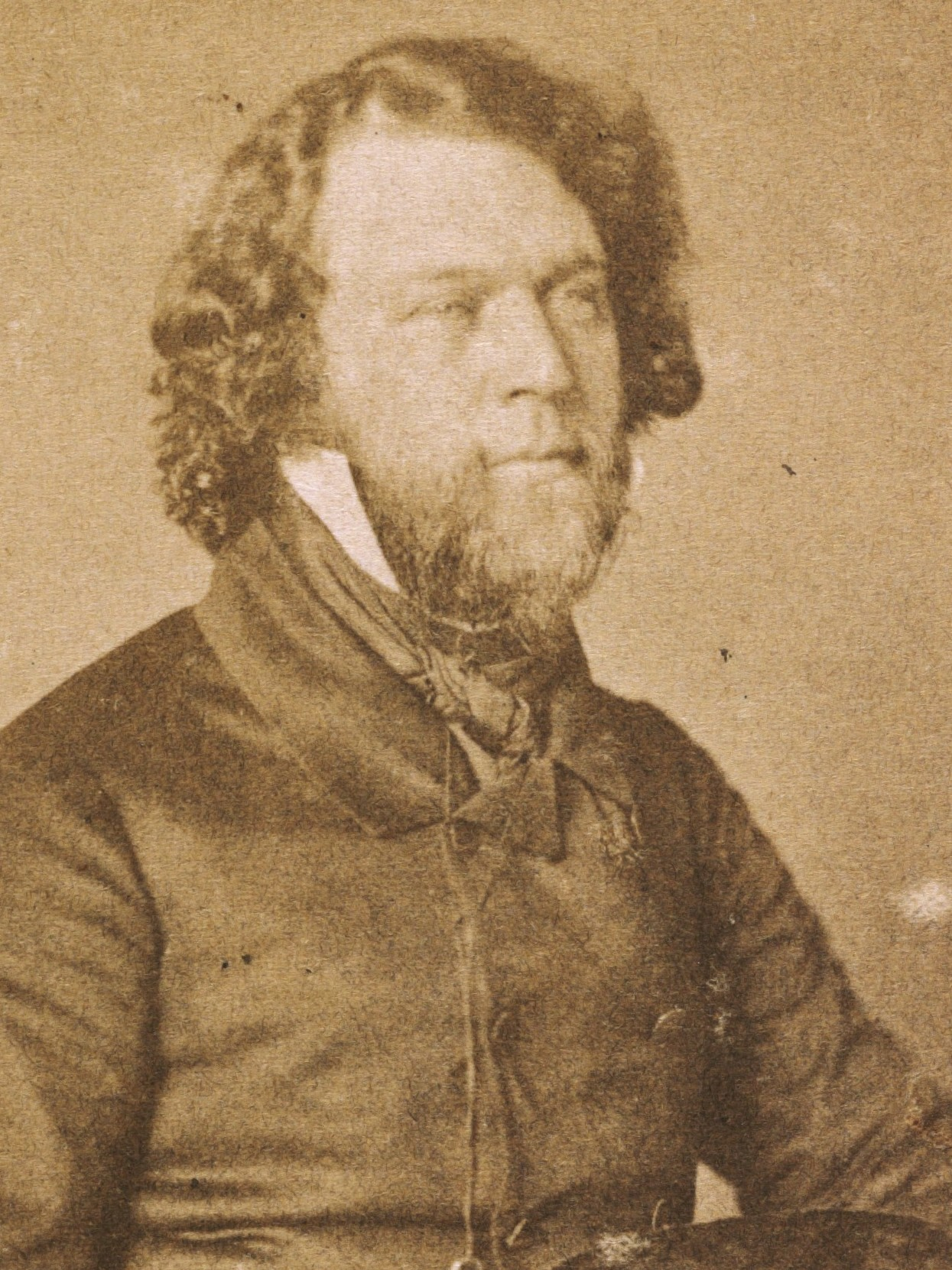
Nominee	Alexander Henry	Richard Vaux
Party	People's	Democratic
Popular vote	33,771	29,068
Percentage	53.74%	46.26%
Mayor before election
Richard Vaux
Democratic
Elected mayor
Alexander Henry
Republican

The 1858 Philadelphia mayoral election saw the election of Alexander Henry, who unseated incumbent mayor Richard Vaux.

== General election ==
=== Results ===
1858 Philadelphia mayoral election
Party	Candidate	Votes	%
People's	Alexander Henry	33,771	53.74
Democratic	Richard Vaux (incumbent)	29,068	46.26
Total votes		62,839	100.00
