= Pennsylvania Packet =

Historic newspaper of the United States

Pennsylvania Packet and the General Advertiser
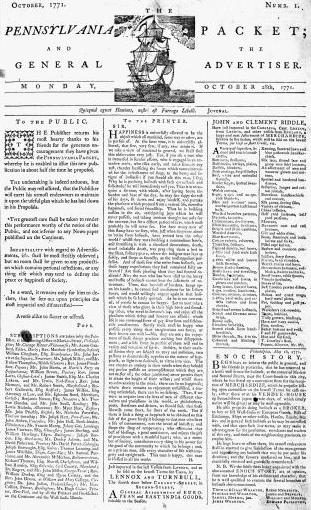
- October 28, 1771 edition
- Owner(s): John Dunlap (founded 1771), David C. Claypoole (until 1800); Zachariah Poulson (1800–1839)
- Founded: 1771
- Ceased publication: merged into The North American (1840)
- Headquarters: Philadelphia; Lancaster (1777–1778)

The Pennsylvania Packet and the General Advertiser was an American newspaper that was founded in 1771. In 1784, it became the first successful daily newspaper published in the United States.

== History and notable features ==
The paper was founded by John Dunlap as a weekly paper in late 1771. It was based in Philadelphia, except during the British occupation of the city between 1777 and 1778, when Dunlap published the paper in Lancaster. David C. Claypoole eventually became a partner with Dunlap. As of September 21, 1784, the paper was issued as the Pennsylvania Packet, and Daily Advertiser, reflecting the paper's move to daily publication.

This newspaper subsequently underwent additional name changes, dropping the Pennsylvania Packet prefix in 1791 and becoming Dunlap's American Daily Advertiser (1791–1793), Dunlap and Claypoole's American Daily Advertiser (1793–1795), and Claypoole's American Daily Advertiser (1796-1800).

On September 21, 1796, it became the first to publish George Washington's Farewell Address.

In 1800, Zachariah Poulson purchased the paper and renamed it Poulson's American Daily Advertiser.

In 1825, the Marquis De Lafayette granted an interview to "Poulson's Advertiser" during his famous visit to the United States.

Poulson ran the paper for almost forty years; at the end of 1839, he sold the publication to the owners of the recently founded North American. The North American featured the 1771 founding of the Packet as its heritage.

To the extent it can honestly be traced past this point, the final successor of the Packet can be said to be The Philadelphia Inquirer.

== See also ==
- Early American publishers and printers
- Newspapers of colonial America
