= Lambada (film) =

- Theatrical release poster
- Directed by: Joel Silberg
- Written by: Joel Silberg; Sheldon Renan
- Produced by: Peter Shepherd; Yoram Globus
- Starring: J. Eddie Peck; Melora Hardin; Shabba-Doo; Ricky Paull Goldin; Basil Hoffman; Dennis Burkley
- Cinematography: Roberto D'Ettorre Piazzoli
- Edited by: Marcus Manton; Andy Horvitch
- Music by: Greg DeBelles
- Production company: Cannon Pictures
- Distributed by: Warner Bros.
- Release date: March 16, 1990
- Running time: 104 minutes
- Country: United States
- Language: English
- Budget: $900,000
- Box office: $4,263,112

Lambada is a 1990 American drama film starring J. Eddie Peck, Melora Hardin, Adolfo "Shabba-Doo" Quiñones, Ricky Paull Goldin, Dennis Burkley, and Keene Curtis. Directed and written by Joel Silberg and choreographed by Shabba-Doo, the film combines a dramatic narrative with vibrant dance sequences centered around the lambada—a provocative and trendy dance style of the time.

Quickly produced and finished shooting just eight days prior to release, Lambada released on the same day as its rival film The Forbidden Dance. Lambada failed to win over critics or audiences, though it was generally considered "the better of the two."

== Plot ==
By day, Kevin Laird is a respected schoolteacher in Beverly Hills. By night, he slips away to a gritty warehouse in East Los Angeles, where local barrio kids gather to dance the lambada.

Kevin dazzles the crowd with his moves and earns the teens' trust—then uses that trust to teach them math and literacy in an improvised backroom classroom. But his carefully balanced double life begins to unravel when one of his students, Sandy, spots him at the club. The next day in class, she fantasizes about a passionate dance and kiss with him, blurring the lines between admiration and obsession. When jealousy takes over, Sandy reveals Kevin's secret, setting off a chain of events that jeopardizes both his career and his carefully constructed world.

== Cast ==
- J. Eddie Peck – Kevin Laird/Blade/Carlos Gutierrez
- Melora Hardin – Sandy Thomas
- Adolfo "Shabba-Doo" Quiñones – Ramone
- Leticia Vasquez – Pink Toes
- Dennis Burkley – Uncle Big
- Rita Bland – Lesley
- Jimmy Locust – Ricochet
- Kayla Blake – Bookworm (as Elsie Sniffen)
- Richard Giorla – Double J
- Debra Hopkins – Muriel (as Debra Spagnoli)
- Eddie Garcia – Chili
- Kristina Starman – Linda Laird
- Keene Curtis – Principal Singleton
- Basil Hoffman – Supt. Leland
- Ricky Paull Goldin – Dean
- Eric Taslitz – Egghead
- Thalmus Rasulala – Wesley Wilson
- Gina Ravera – Funk Queen

== Release and reception ==
Lambada opened on March 16, 1990, at #8, and earned $2,031,181 to 1,117 theaters. It quickly fell from the box office with a scant $4,263,112, after receiving mixed reviews. It holds a 47% on Rotten Tomatoes. Kevin Thomas, in his review (of this film and The Forbidden Dance) for the Los Angeles Times, noted that both of them 'revive the spirit of Sam Katzman, who turned out similar quickies in the ‘50s to cash in on rock ‘n' roll and the Twist'; he singled out Lambada as the 'slicker but more impersonally directed' of the two. The two films also shared a review from Jon Pareles of The New York Times, who described Lambada as the 'glossier [and more] music-video-ready' of the two. Owen Gleiberman paired the two films again in his review for Entertainment Weekly, where he described them as having 'all the allure of a frozen burrito'. In yet another paired review of both films for The Washington Post, Rita Kempley dismissed them as 'pandering and exploitative'; she described Lambada as being 'far lighter on its feet with a flashier look and a professional cast'.

On their syndicated television program, where Lambada was reviewed separately, Gene Siskel and Roger Ebert had an intense disagreement regarding the film. While noting Silberg's limitations as a director, Siskel praised the performances of the lead performers, and described it as 'an instant guilty pleasure [...] a film I'm almost embarrassed to admit held my attention [...] because I'm prepared to defend it now against Roger's sure attacks'. Ebert, who remarked that Siskel 'should be embarrassed' by his opinion of the film, viewed its dance sequences as 'badly lit, badly photographed, badly choreographed' and attacked the camera angles and story-line; he noted that he was 'stunned that anyone would make this picture'.

== Home video ==
Lambada was released on DVD on April 15, 2003.

== Soundtrack ==
1. "Set The Night On Fire" – Sweet Obsession
2. "This Moment In Time" – Absolute
3. "Perfect" – Dina D!
4. "Tease Me, Please Me" – Tony Terry
5. "Lambada Dancing" – Kathy Sledge
6. "Gotta Lambada" – Absolute
7. "I Like The Rhythm" (Sandy's Fantasy Theme) – Carrie Lucas
8. "Rock Lambada" – Johnny Thomas Jr.
9. "Wes Groove" – Billy Wolfer
10. "Sata" – Brenda K. Starr
11. "Give It Up" – Judette Warren
12. "In The Heat Of The Night" – Soul II Soul
