= Chris Taylor (music producer) =

American music producer (born 1962)

The Glove
- Also known as: DJ Glove; ChrisGlove
- Born: Christopher Taylor; May 22, 1962 (age 64); Los Angeles, California, U.S.
- Genre: Hip hop
- Occupations: Rapper; record producer; DJ
- Years active: 1981–present
- Labels: Ruthless; Death Row; Aftermath; Polydor; Interscope
- Member of: Po' Broke & Lonely?

Chris Taylor (born May 22, 1962), also known by his monikers The Glove, DJ Glove, and ChrisGlove, is best known as a DJ and producer on the West Coast hip hop scene in the 1980s and 1990s. Taylor is known for his appearance in the film Breakin' alongside Ice-T. Taylor is credited on "Phone Tap" (The Firm) as producer. Other production credits include "Reckless" (Ice T & Dave Storrs), "Tebitan Jam" (Chris "the Glove" Taylor), "Go Off" (Ice T & Dave Storrs), and "Itchiban Scratch" (Chris "the Glove" Taylor). Taylor produced "Stranded on Death Row" and "Doggy Dogg World" on the genre-defining albums The Chronic and Doggystyle, and also claims to have written/produced the tracks for "Xxplosive" (Dr. Dre) and "Hello" (NWA), though uncredited. Other sources name Taylor as an engineer, mixer and musician on The Chronic.

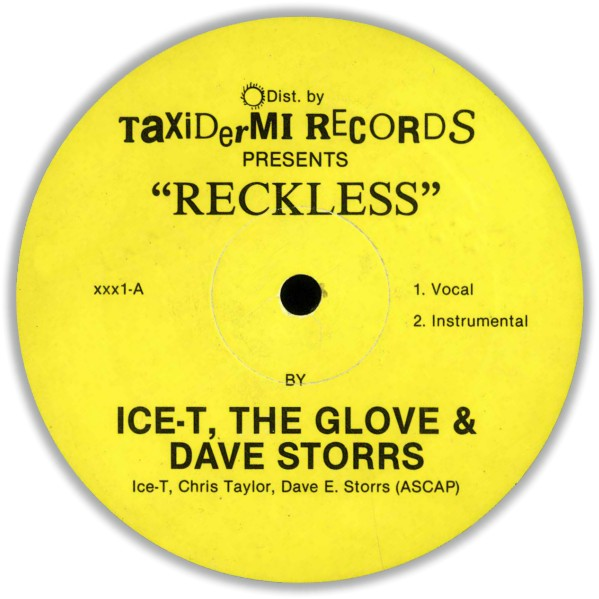
Taylor collaborated with Ice-T to record several electro-influenced records, including the 1984 single "Reckless".

== Career ==
Taylor began his career as a Los Angeles DJ. His first single "Scratch Dance", on Carbon Copy Records, was an all-DJ record which Grandmaster Flash later called "the West Coast version of Wheels of Steel.

He appeared in the 1984 film Breakin and produced the song "Reckless" for its soundtrack. Taylor appeared as the DJ for Chaka Khan for her music video for "I Feel for You".

Taylor also has producer credits with The Firm, "Phone Tap", Welcome to the Aftermath, Focus, and is the founding member of Po' Broke & Lonely?, an R&B act signed to Ruthless Records. He has been the music supervisor on BET reality series Tiny and Toya, Frankie & Neffie, Monica: Still Standing, Hell Date, Played by Fame.

== Later career ==
Taylor is still producing music, contributing to Fatlip's (of The Pharcyde) album on the lead single, “Dust in the Wind” featuring Krayzie Bone. The single, released on February 18, 2022, is part of the album titled Sccit & Siavash The Grouch Present… Fatlip - Torpor.
