= Hector Tyndale =

American military officer (1821–1880)

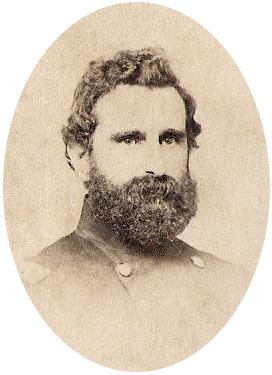
- Born: March 24, 1821; Philadelphia, Pennsylvania, U.S.
- Died: March 19, 1880 (aged 58); Philadelphia, Pennsylvania, U.S.
- Burial place: Laurel Hill Cemetery, Philadelphia, Pennsylvania, U.S.
- Relatives: Sharon Tyndale (brother)
- Military career
- Allegiance: United States of America; Union
- Branch: United States Army; Union army
- Service years: 1861–1864
- Rank: Brigadier General; Brevet Major General
- Unit: XII Corps
- Commands: 28th Pennsylvania Volunteer Infantry
- Conflicts: American Civil War; Second Battle of Bull Run; Battle of Antietam (WIA); Battle of Wauhatchie; Battle of Missionary Ridge
- Other work: Glass and Ceramics Importer

Hector Tyndale (a.k.a. George Hector Tyndale) was an American military officer who served in the Union army during the American Civil War. He fought at the Second Battle of Bull Run and the Battle of Antietam. He was wounded twice during the Battle of Antietam and thought dead from a head wound. After his recovery, he returned to active duty and fought in the Battle of Wauhatchie and the Battle of Missionary Ridge. He was brevetted to Brigadier General for his actions at Antietam and to Major General at the end of the war for gallantry and meritorious service. He was a successful businessman who owned and operated a glass and china importation firm in Philadelphia.

== Early life ==
Tyndale was born on March 24, 1821, in Philadelphia to Robinson and Sarah Thorn Tyndale. His father was an Irish emigrant and a prominent Philadelphia businessman engaged in the importation of china and glassware. Tyndale was accepted to attend the United States Military Academy but declined at the request of his mother.

== Career ==
He served as a corporal in the artillery corps of the Washington Grays and was promoted to captain. He served in the police force during the Philadelphia nativist riots. He served in an expedition for the 1st Cavalry Regiment under Edwin Vose Sumner in the Northwest Territory.

Tyndale entered into the family business in partnership with his brother-in-law. Tyndale made several trips to personally inspect European factories. He became an expert in pottery and porcelain manufacturing and maintained an extensive personal collection.

In 1856, Tyndale became involved in politics as a member of the Free Soil Party and then as a member of the first Republican committee in Philadelphia. Although he did not support John Brown's raid on Harper's Ferry, he agreed to escort the widow of John Brown to pay a last visit to her husband and recover his body after execution. It was believed Mrs. Brown's life was in danger because of her husband's recent actions. Southern newspapers reported that Brown's body had been replaced in his coffin by an African-American corpse as an insult. Tyndale refused to accept the body until the coffin was opened and the body identified as Brown's before accepting it on Mrs. Brown's behalf.

=== Civil War ===
Tyndale was travelling on business in Europe when the Civil War began. He returned to the U.S. and volunteered for the Union Army. He was appointed major in the 28th Pennsylvania Volunteer Infantry on June 28, 1861, under John W. Geary. His regiment was sent to garrison duty at Harpers Ferry. He served under Nathaniel P. Banks in the Shenandoah Valley and John Pope at Chantilly, Virginia. On April 25, 1862, he was promoted to lieutenant colonel and fought at the Second Battle of Bull Run. On September 17, 1862, as lieutenant colonel, Tyndale was the senior officer in his brigade and assumed command of the 1st Brigade, 2nd Division, XII Corps during the Battle of Antietam. Tyndale led his brigade as part of George S. Greene's attack against the Dunker Church. He was grazed by a bullet in his hip and had three horses shot out from under him. He was wounded a second time in the head and assumed dead. His body was taken from the field and he regained consciousness in a field hospital. He returned home to recuperate and was promoted to brigadier general of Volunteers on November 29, 1862, for his actions at Antietam.

In June 1863, he returned to active duty and was assigned to lead a brigade under General Erasmus D. Keyes. He led a brigade under Carl Schurz and took part in the pursuit of Robert E. Lee's retreat from Gettysburg. Later that Fall, Joseph Hooker was assigned to lead reinforcements to the Union Army at Chattanooga. Hooker took with him the XI and XII Corps to which Tyndale's brigade was part of. Tyndale led his brigade at the Battle of Wauhatchie, leading a bayonet charge and turning the enemy's flank. He also took part, albeit in a minor role, in the Battle of Missionary Ridge. On August 26, 1864, Tyndale resigned from the army due to the lingering effects of his head wound. He was brevetted to major general on March 13, 1865, for gallantry and meritorious service during the war.

Command History

- 1st Brigade, 2nd Division, XII Corps (17 Sept 1862)
- 1st Brigade, 3rd Division, XI Corps (13 July – 19 Sept 1863)
- 1st Brigade, 3rd Division, XI Corps (12 Oct 1863 – 15 Feb 1865)
- 3rd Division, XI Corps (15 Feb – 16 Apr 1864)
- 3rd Brigade, 1st Division, XX Corps (16 Apr – 3 May 1864)

=== Post war ===
After the war, Tyndale returned to his business in Philadelphia. He unsuccessfully ran for mayor in 1868. A relative, Professor John Tyndall of England, lectured in the U.S. and devoted the proceeds to fund the promotion of science education and named Tyndale as one of the trustees. Eventually the fund became a scholarship at the University of Pennsylvania and was known as the Hector Tyndale scholarship for physics. In 1869, he was elected as a member to the American Philosophical Society. In 1873, he was elected to the office of Sheriff in Philadelphia.

In 1876 Tyndale's prominence in the porcelain business caused his selection as one of the judges for the Centennial Exhibition.

He was close friends with Walt Whitman and was consulted by Whitman on how to improve the third edition of Leaves of Grass.

Tyndale died on March 19, 1880, and was interred at Laurel Hill Cemetery.

== Personal life ==
He was married to Julia Nowlen in 1842 and together they had a daughter in 1848. His brother was Sharon Tyndale who served as Illinois Secretary of State.
