= Don Campbell (dancer) =

American dancer and choreographer (1951–2020)

- Born: January 8, 1951; Saint Louis, Missouri
- Died: March 30, 2020 (aged 69)
- Other names: Campbellock
- Style: Locking
- Website: https://campbellock.dance/

Don "Campbellock" Campbell (January 8, 1951 – March 30, 2020) was an American dancer and choreographer who was best known for having invented the "locking" dance, and for his work with The Lockers. Born in Saint Louis, Missouri in January 1951, Campbell discovered dance while studying commercial art at Los Angeles Trade–Technical College.

== Early career ==
In 1971, Campbell joined the cast of Soul Train once the program arrived in Los Angeles. He was a featured dancer until 1973, when he was removed from the program for requesting that performers be paid. He then recruited other dancers who had been removed for the same reason, and with them founded the Lockers.

Campbell recorded a song in 1972 titled, "The Campbellock", to go with his new high-flying, groundbreaking dance. He also established his own dance ensemble, The Campbellock Dancers. They later changed their name to The Lockers. Campbell's then girlfriend Toni Basil, former student Fred Berry, Adolfo "Shabadoo" Quinones were onetime members of the group.

The Lockers appeared with some of the greatest entertainers of all time: Frank Sinatra, Bob Hope, Sammy Davis Jr., Dean Martin, Carol Burnett, Doris Day, Dinah Shore, Merv Griffin, Bill Cosby, Roger Miller, Johnny Carson, Dick Van Dyke, Aretha Franklin, John Denver, Roberta Flack, Michael Landon, Richard Pryor, Bette Midler, Donny and Marie Osmond, Howard Cosell, and Cheech & Chong.

The Lockers also appeared on television shows including The Carol Burnett Show (as The Campbellock Dancers), The Tonight Show Starring Johnny Carson (first as The Campbellock Dancers, then as The Lockers), What's Happening (as "The Rockets"), ABC in Concert, The Grammys, The Oscars, and Saturday Night Live (as the first non-musical group to perform on the show). Campbell and his various troupes went on to amass over 80 credits to their name before retiring the act in the early 1980s.

== Cultural impact ==
Some of the most popular videos of years past have featured Campbell's signature steps, predominantly by artists such as The Backstreet Boys, NSYNC, Britney Spears, Christina Aguilera, Wyclef Jean, Snoop Dogg, Jermaine Dupri, Busta Rhymes, Aaliyah, and Mýa. Janet Jackson produced videos to help promote her Rhythm Nation album, which featured Campbell's original steps. Michael Jackson used his Locking style extensively in his choreography for all of his tours and videos.

== Later years ==
Campbell's later life saw him working as an instructor and ambassador, using a documented video biography, and combining it with revolutionary hands-on teaching. He took his approach around the world to such countries as Japan, Canada, Portugal, the United Kingdom, The Netherlands, and Germany.

With the expansion of hip-hop culture worldwide, Campbell made his presence felt attending many prominent events, including Rennie Harris Puremovement Presents Illdelphi Legends and The Legends of HipHop, The Back to Mecca Conferences, The Bboy Summits, The American Street Dance Championships, The 1st Annual HipHop Dance Awards, The Bboy Pro-Am, The Zulu Nation Anniversary, The USA/World HipHop Dance Championships, and Up Jump The Boogie.

Campbell was honored at the first ever Hip-Hop Conference, which was held at the Rock and Roll Hall of Fame. Artifacts such as Campbell's outfits worn during his career were on display inside the Hall, as part of an exhibit designed to help promote awareness about Hip-Hop culture.

The media renewed interest in Campbell over the years. Articles have appeared in publications Like: WAV/Kotori Magazine (2005), Elemental Magazine (05/04), V Magazine (09/02), RapPages (04/99 and 12/98), Insomniac (1/99), Vibe (9/98), New York Press (9/98) LA Times (3/94), as well as, 360HipHop.com (07/00) and Charged.com (09/98). Don also headlines a chapter on early LA Hip-Hop in the coffee table book "Vibe's History of Hip-Hop"

Latterly, as well as making teaching, judging, and speaking engagements, Campbell was also working on a number of projects with his son Dennis which included an illustrated book of his dance teachings, an autobiography, a DVD, and a feature film based on his life.

He died in Santa Clarita, California in March 2020 at the age of 69.

== See also ==
- List of dancers
