= Breakin' 2: Electric Boogaloo =

1984 film by Sam Firstenberg

- Theatrical release poster
- Directed by: Sam Firstenberg
- Written by: Charles Parker; Allen DeBevoise; Jan Ventura; Julie Reichert
- Produced by: Yoram Globus; Menahem Golan
- Starring: Lucinda Dickey; Adolfo "Shabba Doo" Quiñones; Michael "Boogaloo Shrimp" Chambers; Susie Bono
- Cinematography: Hanania Baer
- Edited by: Sally Allen; Bert Glatstein; Bob Jenkis; Marcus Manton; Barry Zetlin
- Music by: Michael Linn
- Production company: The Cannon Group
- Distributed by: Tri-Star Pictures
- Release date: December 19, 1984
- Running time: 94 minutes
- Country: United States
- Language: English
- Budget: $3 million
- Box office: $15.1 million (US/Canada)

Breakin' 2: Electric Boogaloo is a 1984 American breakdancing musical film directed by Sam Firstenberg that is a sequel to Breakin', released seven months earlier the same year by the same producers, The Cannon Group. In markets where the earlier film was titled Breakdance, the sequel was released as Breakdance 2: Electric Boogaloo. Another sequel, Rappin' (also known as Breakdance 3), was produced but with an unconnected plot and different lead characters; only Ice-T appears in all three films.

The subtitle "Electric Boogaloo" has entered the popular-culture lexicon as a snowclone nickname to denote an archetypal sequel.

== Plot ==
The three main dancers from Breakin', Kelly "Special K" Bennett, Orlando "Ozone" Barco and Tony "Turbo" Ainley, struggle to stop the demolition of a community recreation center by a developer who wants to build a shopping mall.

== Cast ==
- Lucinda Dickey as Kelly "Special K" Bennett
- Adolfo "Shabba Doo" Quiñones as Orlando "Ozone" Barco
- Michael "Boogaloo Shrimp" Chambers as Tony "Turbo" Ainley
- Susie Coelho (listed as Susie Bono) as Rhonda
- Harry Caesar as Byron
- Sabrina Garcia as Lucia
- Peter MacLean as Mr. Douglas
- Lu Leonard as Head Nurse
- Ken Offson as Randall
- John Christy Ewing as Mr. Bennett, Kelly's Father
- Jo de Winter as Mrs. Bennett, Kelly's Mother
- Herb Mitchell as Stanley
- Sandy Lipton as Mrs. Snyder
- Vidal Rodriguez as Coco
- Ice-T as Rapper "Ice-T"
- Cooley Jackson/Jaxson as Featured Street Dancer TKO
- John LaMotta as a Policeman
- Steve "Sugarfoot" Notario as Strobe
- Kimberly McCullough as Kimberly
- Martika (listed as Marta Marrero) as Kid
- Tyler Birch

== Reception ==
As with its predecessor, Breakin' 2: Electric Boogaloo received mostly negative critical reviews. New York Press film critic Armond White considered it to be "superb" and Roger Ebert awarded the film a three out of four star rating. On review aggregator site Rotten Tomatoes, the film has a 29% positive rating based on seven reviews.

=== Box office ===
The film grossed $2,921,030 in its first five days starting December 21, 1984, playing at 717 theaters in the United States and Canada. It grossed a total of $15.1 million, less than half that of its predecessor but more than three times its budget.

== Soundtrack ==
As with Breakin', much of the film's soundtrack was provided by the duo of Ollie & Jerry. The title track, "Electric Boogaloo", reached #45 on the Billboard R&B chart.

1. "Electric Boogaloo" – Ollie & Jerry
2. "Radiotron" – Firefox
3. "Din Daa Daa" – George Kranz
4. "When I.C.U." – Ollie & Jerry
5. "Gotta Have the Money" – Steve Donn
6. "Believe in the Beat" – Carol Lynn Townes
7. "Set It Out" – Midway
8. "I Don't Wanna Come Down" – Mark Scott
9. "Stylin' Profilin'" – Firefox
10. "Oye Mamacita" – Rags & Riches

=== Charts ===
Chart performance for Breakin' 2: Electric Boogaloo
Chart (1985)	Peak position
Australian Albums (Kent Music Report)	51
UK Albums (Official Charts)	34
US Billboard 200	52
US Top R&B/Hip-Hop Albums (Billboard)	25

== Home video ==
On April 15, 2003, MGM Home Entertainment released Breakin' 2: Electric Boogaloo on DVD format. On April 21, 2015, Shout! Factory released the film, along with Breakin', as a double feature Blu-ray.

== Legacy ==
The subtitle "Electric Boogaloo", originally a reference to a funk-oriented dance style of the same name, entered the popular-culture lexicon as a snowclone used to denote an archetypal sequel. The usual connotation is that of a ridiculous sequel title or of a title of a follow-up to an obscure or eclectic film or other work. While most instances are imaginary, some are real; in 1993, Toronto band Dig Circus rereleased their 1992 album Shekkie with extra tracks as Shekkie II: Electric Boogaloo. The rock band Five Iron Frenzy titled their fourth album Five Iron Frenzy 2: Electric Boogaloo and the mathgrind band The Tony Danza Tapdance Extravaganza titled their sophomore album Danza II: Electric Boogaloo. The band Minus the Bear features the song "Get Me Naked 2: Electric Boogaloo" on the album Highly Refined Pirates. The sitcom It's Always Sunny in Philadelphia's season 11 episode "Chardee MacDennis 2: Electric Boogaloo" is a follow-up to the season 7 episode "Chardee MacDennis: The Game of Games". Other news articles and media have used the "Electric Boogaloo" subtitle, and it has also become an Internet meme. A documentary about the Cannon Group was released in 2014 titled Electric Boogaloo: The Wild, Untold Story of Cannon Films, in which Breakin' and Breakin' 2: Electric Boogaloo were featured. In the film Kicking and Screaming, Grover's promiscuous partners after a breakup with a girl named Jane are collectively called "Jane 2: Electric Boogaloo." The third volume of the Pokémon graphic novel series Pokémon: The Electric Tale of Pikachu by Toshihiro Ono is known in English as Pokémon: Electric Pikachu Boogaloo.

As early as 2012, right-wing activists in the United States began using the term "boogaloo" (or simply "boog") as a dog whistle to describe a rebellion against the American government, implying a desire for a "sequel" to the first American Revolution, which came to widespread attention in late 2019. Those subscribing to this ideology are part of the boogaloo movement, who are often called "boogaloo boys".
