= Alexander Henry (Philadelphia) =

Mayor of Philadelphia from 1858 to 1865

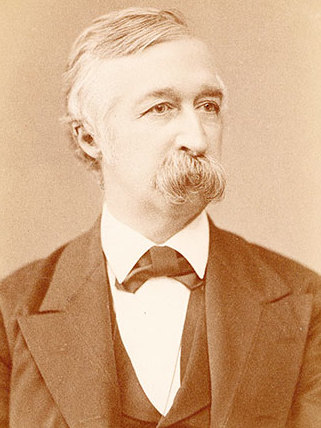

Mayor of Philadelphia
- In office 1858–1865
- Preceded by: Richard Vaux
- Succeeded by: Morton McMichael

Personal details
- Born: April 14, 1823 Philadelphia, Pennsylvania, US
- Died: December 6, 1883 (aged 60) Philadelphia, Pennsylvania, US
- Resting place: Laurel Hill Cemetery

Alexander Henry (April 14, 1823 – December 6, 1883) was an American politician who served three terms as mayor of Philadelphia, Pennsylvania from 1858 to 1865. He was elected as a member of the People's Party but served his second and third terms as a member of the Republican Party. He implemented major increases and improvements to the Philadelphia Police Department. During the American Civil War, he was a staunch supporter of the Union but worked to suppress violence against Confederate sympathizers in the city and helped organize civilians to assist in constructing earthworks to defend the city during the 1863 Gettysburg campaign.

== Biography ==
Henry was born on April 14, 1823, in Philadelphia, one of five children to John Snowden Henry and Elizabeth (Bayard) Henry. His father died when Henry was 12 years old. He was educated at the Germantown Academy and graduated with high honors from Princeton University in 1840. He studied law, passed his bar exam in 1844, and established a prosperous legal firm. He served as inspector of the Custom House from 1845 to 1846, as Secretary to the board of directors at Girard College and as Secretary of the House of Refuge. He married Elizabeth S. Henry (née Paul).

He became active in local politics, was a member of the Whig party and represented the Seventh Ward on the City Council from 1856 to 1857.

In the 1858 Philadelphia mayoral election, Henry defeated the incumbent Richard Vaux and was elected as a member of the People's Party. Henry took office on May 11. Among his platforms was strong support for the city's proposed system of public transportation, including streetcars. The Act of Consolidation, 1854, resulted in a disjointed and disorganized police force. He implemented changes to the organization of the Philadelphia police force which required testing applicants rather than the political appointment process that was used previously. He increased the size of the police force, implemented a beat patrolling system and initiated the first detective department in the Philadelphia Police Department history. Henry switched to the Republican Party and won reelection in the 1860 Philadelphia mayoral election against John Robbins Jr.

He was a staunch supporter of the Union and hosted President Abraham Lincoln in Philadelphia on his way to his inauguration. While he did not tolerate any sympathies for the Confederacy, he also fought to prevent violence in the city against Confederate sympathizers. On April 15, 1861, at the beginning of the Civil War, when news of the Confederate attack on Fort Sumter arrived in Philadelphia, Union supporters lashed out against Southern sympathizers. A mob of several hundred people threatened the Palmetto Flag, a secessionist newspaper, until Henry appeared in the newspaper building window with an American flag and convinced the crowd to disperse. Crowds continued for the next few days to roam throughout the city demanding that businesses and schools display a show of patriotism. Suspected Southern sympathizers had their houses mobbed and attacked until they relented and displayed a show of patriotism or took refuge. Henry responded to the growing crisis, and led efforts, along with the city police, to turn away the rioters and quell the unrest. Henry won reelection for a third term in the 1862 Philadelphia mayoral election against Daniel M. Fox.

During the Gettysburg Campaign in June 1863, he called out the home guard under Brigadier General A. J. Pleasonton to help defend the city and encouraged citizens to help strengthen the line of earthworks and small forts ringing the main approaches to Philadelphia. Henry, along with Maj. Gen. Napoleon J. T. Dana, organized a work party of 700 men for this effort.

In late 1865, Henry chose not to run for another term and left office on January 1, 1866. He served as a trustee of the University of Pennsylvania from 1864 to 1883, as an inspector of the Eastern State Penitentiary and was a bank director for several years. He also was a leading member of the board of directors that planned the 1876 Centennial Exposition. He retired to a stately home in the East Falls neighborhood in Philadelphia.

Henry died on December 6, 1883, in Philadelphia at age 60 from pneumonia after an extended visit to Europe and was interred in Laurel Hill Cemetery.

== Legacy ==
Henry Avenue in the Roxborough neighborhood of Philadelphia was named in his honor.

The house at 3460 West School House Lane in the East Falls neighborhood of Philadelphia where Henry lived from 1867 to 1888 is known today as the Alexander Henry House. In 2022, the Philadelphia Historic Commission added the Alexander Henry Carriage House and Stable to the Philadelphia Register of Historic Places.

== Sources ==
- Campbell, Sir John H., History of the Friendly Sons of St. Patrick and of the Hibernian Society for the Relief of Immigrants from Ireland. Philadelphia: Hibernian Society, 1892.
- Weigley, Russell F. (1982). "The Border City in Civil War, 1854–1865". In Weigley, Russell F.; Wainwright, Nicholas B.; Wolf, Edwin II (eds.). Philadelphia: A 300 Year History. New York: W. W. Norton. ISBN 978-0-393-01610-9.

Political offices
Preceded by Richard Vaux	Mayor of Philadelphia; 1858–1865	Succeeded by Morton McMichael
