= Morton McMichael =

American newspaper publisher and politician (1807-1879)

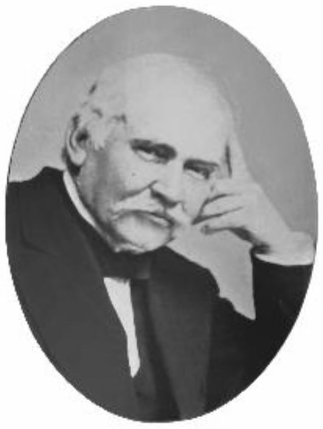

Mayor of Philadelphia
- In office January 1, 1866 – January 1, 1869
- Preceded by: Alexander Henry
- Succeeded by: Daniel M. Fox

Personal details
- Born: October 2, 1807 Bordentown, New Jersey, U.S.
- Died: January 6, 1879 (aged 71) Philadelphia, Pennsylvania, U.S.
- Resting place: Laurel Hill Cemetery
- Party: Jacksonian Democrat; Democrat; Whig; Republican
- Spouse: Mary Estell
- Education: University of Pennsylvania
- Profession: Newspaper publisher

Morton McMichael (October 2, 1807 – January 6, 1879) was an American newspaper editor, publisher, civic leader and mayor of Philadelphia, Pennsylvania from 1866 to 1869.

He worked as the editor of The Saturday Evening Post and Godey's Lady's Book and as editor-in-chief of the Saturday Courier. He co-founded the Saturday Gazette and was publisher of The North American. He chaired the Executive Consolidation Committee that developed the Act of Consolidation of 1854 to expand the borders of the city of Philadelphia and include all of Philadelphia County. He served as president of the Fairmount Park Commission.

McMichael Park, Morton McMichael Elementary School and the McMichael Room in the Philadelphia Union League are all named in his honor.

== Early life ==
McMichael was born on October 2, 1807, in Burlington County, New Jersey, to John and Hannah McMichael. His father was a soldier during the War of 1812 and worked with Joseph Bonaparte, the older brother of Napoleon Bonaparte and former King of Spain.

His family moved to Philadelphia when he was young and he attended the University of Pennsylvania. He read law under David Paul Brown and William M. Meredith and was admitted to the Philadelphia bar in 1827, but never practiced law.

== Newspaper career ==
McMichael became an editor of The Saturday Evening Post in 1826. From 1831 to 1836 he was editor-in-chief of the Saturday Courier. In 1836 he founded the Saturday News along with Louis A. Godey and Joseph C. Neal. He worked as the editor of Godey's Lady's Book from 1842 to 1844. He published the Saturday Gazette with Joseph C. Neal from 1844 to 1847. At the age of 39, he partnered with George Rex Graham for the publication of The North American. McMichael led the merger of the United States Gazette into the North American which also brought Robert Montgomery Bird into the organization as editor. Graham left the paper in 1848 and McMichael and Bird built the North American into a success.

The paper grew to prominence and McMichael became sole publisher in 1854 when co-owner Robert Montgomery Bird died. He remained publisher until his own death in 1879, though his sons took over active operations in his final years.

== Political career ==
McMichael served in a number of political positions throughout his life. He began his service as a police magistrate and then as an Alderman in the Spring Garden neighborhood of Philadelphia. As an Alderman, he also served as Justice of the peace for the County of Philadelphia.

During the 1837 anti-abolition riots in Philadelphia, McMichael helped break up a mob and prevent the burning of an African-American orphanage.

McMichael began his political career in 1838 as a Jacksonian Democrat but drifted away from that ideology and became a Democrat, a Whig in 1843 and a Republican in 1857. McMichael was attracted to the Republicans' strong stance on high tariffs and less so on their abolitionist beliefs.

In 1843 he was elected Sheriff of Philadelphia County, serving until 1846. McMichael served his three-year term as Sheriff during the Philadelphia nativist riots and helped prevent further violence.

In 1854, McMichael chaired the Executive Consolidation Committee, which developed the Consolidation Act of 1854 that merged the city of Philadelphia with many of the surrounding districts into a single political entity. His newspaper also argued for a new street numbering system to replace the city’s confusing address system, which often numbered houses in the order they were built rather than by location and resulted in fractional house numbers along streets.

Thoroughout the American Civil War, He saw the succession of the South as treason and that slavery was incompatible with re-consolidation of the Union and Confederacy. After the assassination of Lincoln, he became a strong advocate for Republicanism and anti-slavery.

In 1865, McMichael defeated Democrat Daniel M. Fox by 5,000 votes and was elected as the Mayor of Philadelphia. While he was mayor, the Fairmount Park Commission was established. McMichael served on the board and, once his term ended in 1869, was appointed as president of the commission, serving until his death.

He was offered a position as minister to Great Britain by President Ulysses S. Grant but declined.

In 1873 he was appointed a delegate at large to the fourth Constitutional convention of Pennsylvania. This resulted in the establishment of the Pennsylvania Constitution of 1874.

== Personal life ==
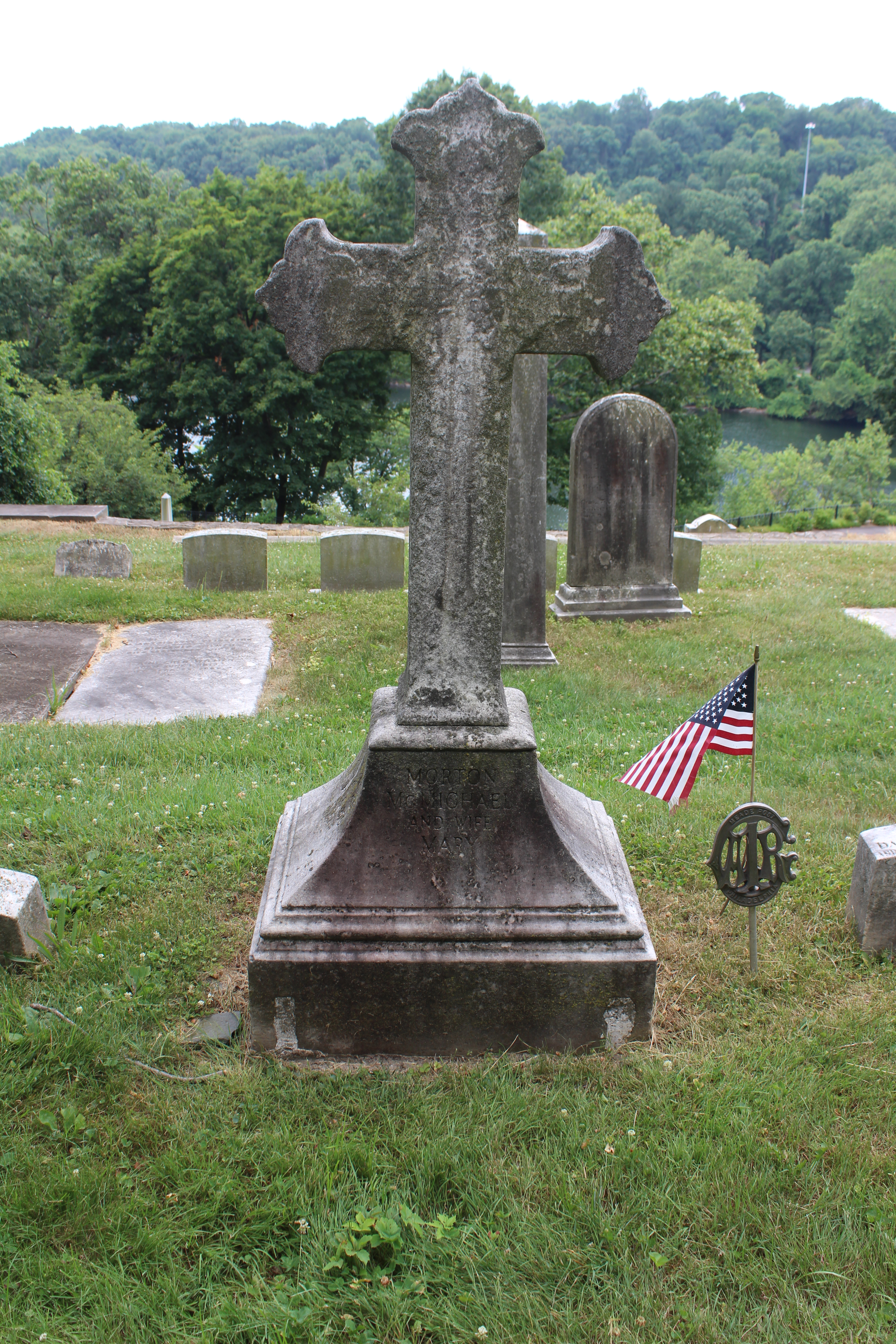
Morton McMichael tombstone in Laurel Hill Cemetery

McMichael married Mary Estell (1822-1877) and had four children:

- Morton McMichael Jr. served as Lt. Colonel under General John Reynolds during the American Civil War. He served as a senior staff member in the Army of The Potomac under Reynolds at the Battle of Gettysburg, where Gen. Reynolds was killed in action during siege. McMichael Jr. became a prominent banker after the war, serving as President of the First National Bank, and of The Penn Club from 1888 to 1904.
- William McMichael served during the American Civil War. He was captured at the Battle of Shiloh and endured four months as a prisoner of war before being exchanged. He rose to the rank of Brevet Colonel and served as adjutant-general under Gen. Henry Halleck. After the war, he embarked on a legal career. He served as Minister to Santo Domingo, Asst. Attorney General, US Attorney for the Eastern District of Pennsylvania, and as a member of the Board of Indian Commissioners. He was also President of the Law Academy of Philadelphia.
- Clayton McMichael also served in the Union Army, fought at Gettysburg, and rose to the rank of brevet Major and serving as aide-de-camp to Gen. David Birney and Gen. Winfield Scott Hancock. He later replaced his father as Editor of The North American. He also served as a US Marshall for the District of Columbia and as Philadelphia City Treasurer.
- Charles McMichael, was a lawyer and served as a Judge in the Philadelphia Court of Common Pleas.

He was elected as a member of the American Philosophical Society in 1867. He served as president of the Union League after Horace Binney.

McMichael died on January 6, 1879, as a result of inflammatory rheumatism and was interred at Laurel Hill Cemetery.

== Legacy ==
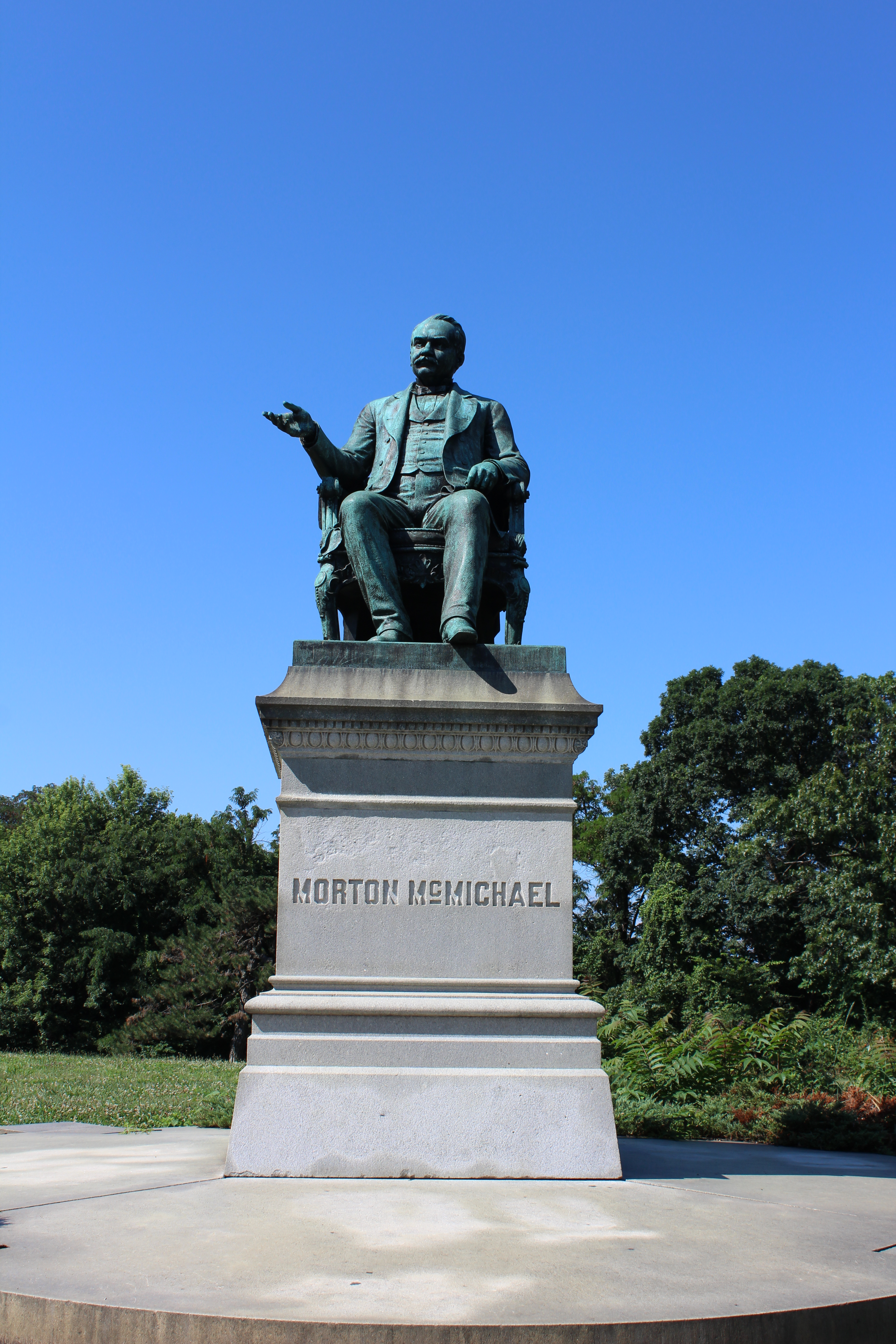
Morton McMichael Statue in Fairmount Park

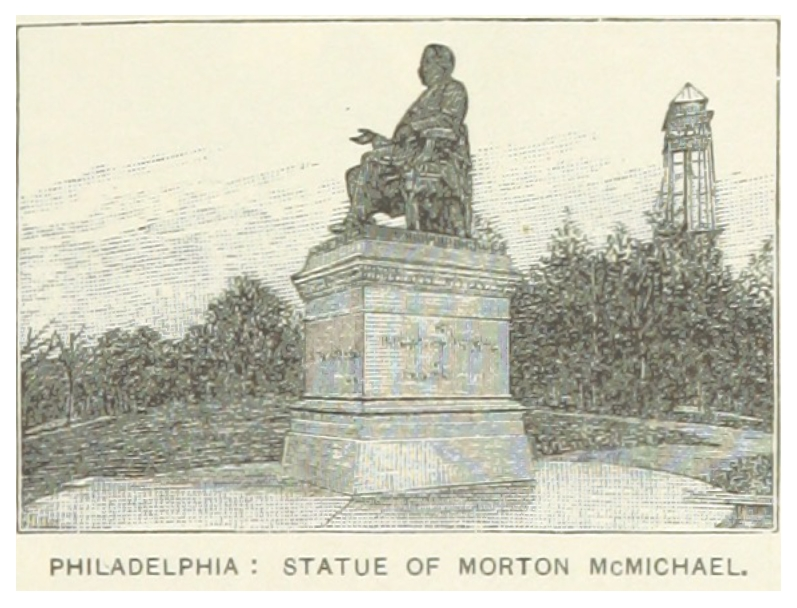
Sketch of Morton McMichael statue

A statue of McMichael, unveiled in 1882, sits in Philadelphia's Fairmount Park at Sedgely Drive and Lemon Hill Drive.

Several things in Philadelphia were named in his honor, including:

- McMichael Park in the East Falls neighborhood of Philadelphia
- The Morton McMichael Elementary School in the Philadelphia public school system
- The McMichael Room in the Union League building

Political offices
Preceded by Alexander Henry	Mayor of Philadelphia; 1866–1869	Succeeded by Daniel M. Fox
