= Locking (dance) =

Type of dance step

Locking is a style of funk dance. The name is based on the concept of locking movements, which means freezing from a fast movement and "locking" in a certain position, holding that position for a short while and then continuing at the same speed as before. It relies on fast and distinct arm and hand movements combined with more relaxed hips and legs. The movements are generally large and exaggerated, and often very rhythmic and tightly synced with the music. Locking is performance oriented, often interacting with the audience by smiling or giving them a high five, and some moves are quite comical.

Locking was originally danced to traditional funk music, such as that produced or performed by James Brown. Funk music is still commonly favored by locking dancers and used by many competitions such as the locking divisions of Juste Debout and Summer Dance Forever. Locking movements create a strong contrast towards the many fast moves that are otherwise performed quite continuously, combined with mime style performance and acting and other dancers. Locking includes many acrobatics and physically demanding moves, such as landing on one's knees and the split. These moves often require knee protection.

== History ==
The beginning of locking can be traced to Don Campbell. In the late 1960s he put together several fad dances adding moves of his own (known as the "Lock") when performing. The original lock was created by accident: Campbell couldn't do a move called the "Robot Shuffle" and stopped at a particular point whilst moving his arms, creating a 'locking' effect. He wasn't able to perform it fluently, for he couldn't remember which step to take next. (Even the acting towards the audience was spontaneous: when people started laughing at Don because of his unfamiliar moves, he responded by pointing at them.) These halts soon became popular as Don added them into his performances. The resulting dance was called Campbellocking, which was later shortened to Locking due to a legal issue with the record company that produced Don's song "The Campbellock". In the early 1970s this set off a movement of locking dance groups, notably Campbell's group The Lockers. Other lockers Jimmy "Scoo B Doo" Foster, Greggory "Campbellock Jr." Pope, Tony "GoGo" Lewis, Fred "Mr Penguin" Berry (a.k.a. Rerun), Leo "Fluky Luke" Williamson, Damita Jo Freeman and others also helped set the foundation for the locking dance and clothes style.

Clothes style can consist of loud striped socks, pegged pants that stop at the knees, bright colorful satin shirts with big collars, big colorful bow ties, gigantic Apple Boy hats, and white gloves.

== Moves ==
Locking may be done in solo or with two or more dancers doing steps or handshakes together. A locker may smile while performing to emphasize the comical nature of the dance; other times, a serious demeanor will be maintained to place emphasis on technique. Other important stylistic features are waving of arms, pointing, walking stationary and grabbing and rotating the cap or hat. Don Campbell created the original freezes, incorporating his unique rhythm and adding gestures such as points and handclaps. Other dancers also adapted this style while creating other steps and moves.

Locking is by nature an improvisational dance but also consists of a set of signature moves of locking pioneers, However, many lockers alter or blend these with other moves or create their own variations. In general, lockers will often put a small pause and move up on the second and fourth beats to emphasize the locking.

Alpha
Created by Alpha Anderson. One leg is kicked forward from a crouching position while the upper body is leaned backwards. The upper body can be supported by both hands or no hands at all.
Break down/Rocksteady
In the squatting position, shift the pelvis to the side, then back to the center. Stand up, then return to the squatting position again and repeat the movement for the other side.
Jazz split
A semi-split done with one leg bent, enabling the dancer to get up again in one swift movement
Whichaway
Altering twirl kicks to the sides first, starting with one leg and using the momentum to "kick" the other out like a pendulum. The upper body remains stationary with the arms out front.
Kick
A single powerful and high leg kick while standing on the other
Knee Drop
A drop to the knees with the knees pointing inwards(into a W shape leg position)
Leo Walk
A funky two step where the first step is an exaggerated step in a particular direction. The other foot is then slid across the floor to meet the first.
Lock/Double Lock
Bending slightly forward with arms forming a circle downward, as if lifting a heavy object

Up Lock (Muscle man)

A macho man pose, where the arms are drawn above the shoulder. The pose is generally held for a moment or two.
Pacing
A quick jab to the side. The wrist should be loose while the arm is tight. The arm is lowered in between jabs.
Pimp Walk
A two-step involving a small kick of one leg before bringing the other foot beside it. As the other foot reaches the first one, there is a knee split into a "v" shape without stepping again.
Stop and Go
Created by Jimmy "Scoo B Doo" Foster; starting with a muscle man lock, step back with one foot and punch, do a quarter turn in the direction of the back foot breakdown once, and then return reach-around to the same position
Stomp the cockroach
A ground technique that involves going on one knee and smacking the ground with your hand, indicating you are stomping something beneath you
Scoo B Doo
Created by Jimmy "Scoo B Doo" Foster; doing a muscle man lock then doing two separate kicks while pacing with one hand in time with the kicks
Scoo B Doo walk
Created by Jimmy "Scoo B Doo" Foster; Walking forward, lifting leg up and bending your back towards the knee
Scoobot
Created by Jimmy "Scoo B Doo" Foster; One arm and leg out then switching to the other leg. Leg out and arms crossed then wrist twirl and clap behind
Scoobot hop
Slightly varied from scoobot with legs hopping towards the sides then the front
Floor Sweep
Using your hand to swiftly move left to right on the floor, as if using a cloth to wipe.
The Skeeter Rabbit
Created by Anthony “Tony Go Go” Lewis for James “Skeeter Rabbit” Higgins; a kick and shuffle hop sequence, ending with a Scoo B Doo a kick-step. Tony Go Go was attempting the Scoo B Doo on uneven grounds in his Mother’s backyard and stumbled onto the kick and shuffle sequence by accident as he was caught off balance, hence creating the original 6-count sequence that is known today as the Skeeter Rabbit. He would go on to introduce that move to fellow Go Go Brothers crew mate, James Higgins, and it would eventually become his signature move, hence adopting the alias, “Skeeter Rabbit”.
Funky Guitar
Hands positioned as if holding a guitar, and start walking backwards
Point
A quick, extended pointing gesture coming from opposite shoulder, usually held for a few seconds for emphasis
Wrist Twirl
Twirling wrists while moving arms up
The Seek
Doing a breakdown whilst rolling your arms in front of you and then lifting a hand up over your eyes as if you are looking/seeking for something
Hitch Hike
Arms up and then crossed in front of you, and then three hitchhiker thumbs up to the right and then the left

== See also ==
- Popping
- Vogue (dance)
- Waacking
- Hip-hop dance
