= Zachariah Poulson =

American journalist

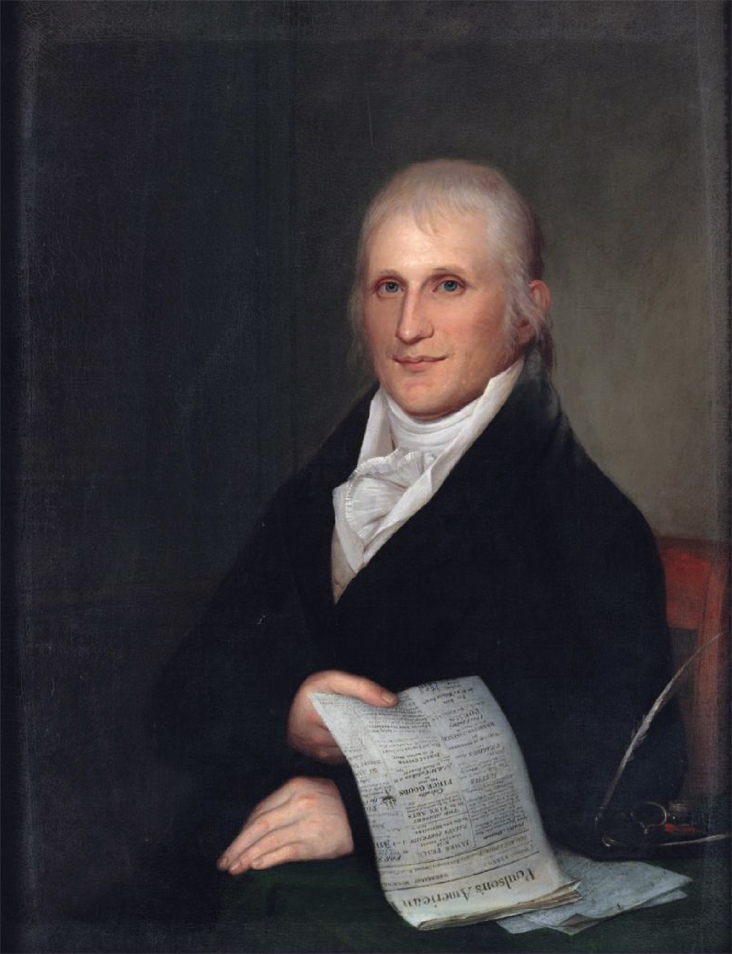
Zachariah Poulson. (by James Peale) The newspaper contains an advertisement that reads "James Peale / No. 69 / Lombard Street / Paints Portraits / In Oils And Miniature / Oct. 29, 1808." Adjacent to this advertisement is one for the museum run by James' brother, Charles Willson Peale.

Zachariah Poulson (1761—1844) was an American editor and publisher.

Poulson was born in Philadelphia in 1761. In 1800, he purchased Claypoole's American Daily Advertiser, the successor to America's first daily newspaper, the Pennsylvania Packet. He was state printer for some years, and the publisher of Poulson's Town and Country Almanac, 1789-1801. He also published Proud's History of Pennsylvania, 1797-98. He was a member of several literary and charitable associations, and connected with the Library Company of Philadelphia for 58 years.

== Printed works ==
- Ninian Magruder. An inaugural dissertation on the small-pox (1792)
- Samuel Cooper. A dissertation on the properties and effects of the datura stramonium, or common thorn-apple (1797)
