= Breakin' =

1984 film by Joel Silberg

- Theatrical release poster
- Directed by: Joel Silberg
- Screenplay by: Charles Parker; Allen DeBevoise
- Story by: Charles Parker; Allen DeBevoise; Gerald Scaife
- Produced by: Allen DeBevoise; David Zito
- Starring: Lucinda Dickey; Shabba Doo; Boogaloo Shrimp; Ben Lokey; Phineas Newborn III; Christopher McDonald
- Cinematography: Hanania Baer
- Edited by: Larry Bock; Gib Jaffe; Vincent Sklena
- Music by: Michael Boyd; Gary Remal
- Production companies: Cannon Films; Golan-Globus
- Distributed by: MGM/UA Entertainment Company
- Release date: May 4, 1984
- Running time: 87 minutes
- Country: United States
- Language: English
- Budget: $1.2 million
- Box office: $38.7 million

Breakin' (also known as Breakdance in the United Kingdom and Break Street '84 in other regions) is a 1984 American breakdancing-themed musical film directed by Joel Silberg and written by Charles Parker and Allen DeBevoise based on a story by Parker, DeBevoise and Gerald Scaife about dancer Alysha Williams.

The film's setting was inspired by a 1983 documentary titled Breakin' 'n' Enterin', set in the multi-racial hip hop club Radio-Tron, based out of MacArthur Park in Los Angeles. Many of the artists and dancers from that documentary, including Ice-T (who makes his film debut as a club MC), and Michael "Boogaloo Shrimp" Chambers, went straight from Breakin' 'n' Enterin' to star in Breakin'.

The film's soundtrack featured the hits "Breakin'... There's No Stopping Us" by Ollie & Jerry, "Freakshow on the Dance Floor" by The Bar-Kays and the UK Top 20 hit "Body Work" by Hot Streak.

Breakin' was one of the final Cannon film productions released by MGM/UA. After release, MGM and Cannon dissolved their distribution deal, reportedly over the potentially X-rated content in John Derek's film Bolero and MGM's then-policy of not theatrically releasing X-rated material, forcing Cannon to become an in-house distribution company once again.

Breakin' was released to theaters on May 4, 1984, and despite receiving negative reviews from critics, it was a box office success. A theatrical sequel entitled Breakin' 2: Electric Boogaloo was released later in the same year.

== Plot ==
Protagonist Kelly "Special K" Bennett is a young dancer training under instructor Franco in Venice, California. Through her friend Adam, Kelly meets two street dancers, Ozone and Turbo on the boardwalk at Venice Beach. Kelly is enamored with their dancing, and all three become friends. This leads to their becoming their own dance troupe.

Franco tells Kelly that breakdancing is low-class and not a real art. He is disrespectful to Ozone and Turbo, and makes inappropriate advances on Kelly. She quits training with Franco. Later, Kelly attends a dance audition and is shut down by harsh directors.

Kelly then wanders to a breakdancing event where she finds Ozone and Turbo in the midst of a dance battle that they eventually lose against rivals "Electro Rock." Adam convinces Ozone and Turbo to teach Kelly how to breakdance. After training for a while, the three defeat Electro Rock. Kelly convinces the troupe to enroll in a dance competition. Kelly's agent friend, James, sees what the group can do and agrees to back them.

The competition requirements are traditional, socially respected styles of dance. The troupe walks before the judges in tuxedos, top hats and white gloves to give the impression of traditional dancers. Just before the audition starts, they rip off the sleeves of their shirts and show their true style. The judges are initially shocked and disapproving, yet within two minutes of their audition, the judges recognize the troupe's talent and allow them to continue. The troupe earns a standing ovation from the judges and win the competition. The troupe's popularity skyrockets, and all three members continue dancing professionally and in the community.

In a mid-credits scene, Special K, Ozone, and Turbo meet James some time after the competition, who informs them about a new phenomenon known as "the electric boogaloo."

== Cast ==
- Lucinda Dickey as Kelly "Special K" Bennett
- Adolfo "Shabba Doo" Quiñones as Orlando "Ozone" Barco
- Michael "Boogaloo Shrimp" Chambers as Tony "Turbo" Ainley
- Ice T as Rap Talker
- Chris "The Glove" Taylor as Club Radiotron DJ
- Ben Lokey as Franco
- Christopher McDonald as James Wilcox
- Phineas Newborn III as Adam
- Vidal "Lil Coco" Rodriguez as "Hot Tot"
- Bruno "Pop N' Taco" Falcon as Electro Rock 1
- Timothy "Popin' Pete" Solomon as Electro Rock 2
- Ana "Lollipop" Sanchez as Electro Rock 3
- Cooley Jaxson as Himself, A Dancer
- Peter Bromilow as Judge
- Michel Qissi as Background Dancing Spectator (uncredited)
- Jean-Claude Van Damme as Spectator In First Dance Sequence (uncredited)
- Richie Cerrone as "Lil R" Background Dancer (uncredited)

== Production ==
According to the 2014 documentary Electric Boogaloo: The Wild, Untold Story of Cannon Films, Menahem Golan of Cannon Films was inspired to create the film after his daughter saw a breakdancer perform in Venice Beach, California. Golan pressured the production crew to complete the film before Orion Pictures released its breakdancing film Beat Street.

== Music ==
=== Soundtrack ===
The film's soundtrack was released by Polydor Records in 1984. The album contains the first album performance by rapper Ice-T, produced by DJ Chris "The Glove" Taylor and David Storrs.

==== Track listing ====
Side one
No.	Title	Writer(s)	Artist	Length
1.	"Breakin'... There's No Stopping Us"	Ollie E. Brown, Jerry Knight	Ollie & Jerry	4:34
2.	"Freakshow on the Dance Floor"	The Bar-Kays, Allen A. Jones	The Bar-Kays	4:42
3.	"Body Work"	Curtis Hudson	Hot Streak	4:22
4.	"99 ½"	John Fottman, Maxi Anderson	Carol Lynn Townes	4:02
5.	"Showdown"	Ollie E. Brown, Joe Curiale	Ollie & Jerry	3:57

Side two
No.	Title	Writer(s)	Artist	Length
1.	"Heart of the Beat"	Dan Hartman, Charlie Midnight	3V	4:18
2.	"Street People"	Ollie E. Brown, Jerry Knight	Fire Fox	3:23
3.	"Cut It"	Paul Fishman	Re-Flex	3:11
4.	"Ain't Nobody"	Hawk Wolinski	Rufus and Chaka Khan	4:45
5.	"Reckless" (Rap by Ice-T)	Chris "The Glove" Taylor, David Storrs	Chris "The Glove" Taylor & David Storrs	3:57

The soundtrack album does not include several previously released songs that are heard in the film, such as "Boogie Down" by Al Jarreau, "Tour de France" by Kraftwerk, "Beat Box" by Art of Noise and "Tibetan Jam" by Chris "The Glove" Taylor.

==== Weekly charts ====
Weekly chart performance for Breakin'
Chart (1984)	Peak position
Australian Albums (Kent Music Report)	6
Austrian Albums (Ö3 Austria)	15
Canada Top Albums/CDs (RPM)	27
Dutch Albums (Album Top 100)	32
European Albums (Eurotipsheet)	8
Finnish Albums (Suomen virallinen lista)	25
German Albums (Offizielle Top 100)	24
New Zealand Albums (RMNZ)	17
Swedish Albums (Sverigetopplistan)	18
Swiss Albums (Schweizer Hitparade)	25
UK Albums (Official Charts)	6
US Billboard 200	8
US Top R&B/Hip-Hop Albums (Billboard)	2

==== Year-end charts ====
Year-end chart performance for Breakin'
Chart (1984)	Position
Australian Albums (Kent Music Report)	64
UK Albums (Gallup)	51
US Billboard 200	78
US Soundtrack Albums (Billboard)	6
US Top R&B/Hip-Hop Albums (Billboard)	33

== Release ==
=== Home media ===
On August 5, 2003, MGM Home Entertainment released Breakin' on DVD. On April 21, 2015, Shout! Factory released Breakin', along with its sequel, Breakin' 2: Electric Boogaloo, as a double feature Blu-ray.

== Reception ==
=== Box office ===
Breakin' opened in 1,069 venues on May 4, 1984 and outgrossed Sixteen Candles, which had more screens (1,240), earning $6,047,686. By the end of its run, the film grossed $38,682,707 at the domestic box office, making it the 18th-top-grossing film of 1984.

=== Critical response ===
Roger Ebert awarded the film 1.5 stars out of 4, calling it "a stiff and awkward story, interrupted by dance sequences of astonishing grace and power." Ebert praised the dancing and the chemistry of the stars but panned the screenplay and supporting characters.

Breakin' currently holds a 33% rating on Rotten Tomatoes based on nine reviews.

== In popular culture ==
Several months before the film's release, Shabba Doo, Boogaloo Shrimp, Pop n' Taco, Popin' Pete, DJ Chris "The Glove" Taylor and Lollipop were all featured in the music video for Chaka Khan's remake of the 1979 Prince song "I Feel for You".

Ice-T, who had small roles in both Breakin' and its sequel Breakin' 2: Electric Boogaloo and was featured on the soundtrack to both films, considers the film and his own performance in it to be "wack".

In 2019, the documentary Boogaloo Shrimp by Taylor Golonka was released on Amazon Prime. It focuses on the life of Michael Chambers, who plays Turbo in Breakin'.
