= Red Bull BC One Middle East Africa Finals =

This page provides the summary of RBBC1 Middle East Africa Qualifier/Finals.

Since 2012, Red Bull BC One has held a qualifier for the World Final in the Middle East Africa Region. The winner advances to the Red Bull BC One World Final.

== Winners ==
Year	Location	Winner	Crew
2015	Cairo, Egypt	(Morocco) Lil Zoo	Lhiba King Zoo
2014	Algiers, Algeria	(South Africa) Benny	Hand Break Turn
2013	Amman, Jordan	(Morocco) Lil Zoo	Lhiba King Zoo
2012	Marrakesh, Morocco	(Morocco) Lil Zoo	Lhiba King Zoo

== 2015 ==
=== RBBC1 Middle East Africa 2015 results ===
Location: Cairo, Egypt

Round of 16
(Jordan) Isheh	L
(Egypt) Klash	W
(United Arab Emirates) Solrac	L
(South Africa) The Curse	W
(Egypt) Manchester	L
(Morocco) Cri6	W
(South Africa) Toufeeq	L
(Algeria) Ammaro	W
(Bahrain) Huey Flava	W
(Egypt) Mohammed	L
(Kuwait) CSick	L
(South Africa) Benny	W
(Oman) Engine	W
(Tunisia) Carbon	L
(Lebanon) Abi	L
(Morocco) Lil Zoo	W

Quarter-finals
(Egypt) Klash	W
(South Africa) The Curse	L
(Morocco) Cri6	L
(Algeria) Ammaro	W
(Bahrain) Huey Flava	L
(South Africa) Benny	W
(Oman) Engine	L
(Morocco) Lil Zoo	W

Semi-finals
(Egypt) Klash	W
(Algeria) Ammaro	L
(South Africa) Benny	L
(Morocco) Lil Zoo	W

Final
(Morocco) Lil Zoo	W
(Egypt) Klash	L
Third place

== 2014 ==
=== RBBC1 Middle East Africa 2014 results ===
Location: Algiers, Algeria

Round of 16
(Morocco) Wolf	W
(Kuwait) Csick	L
(Algeria) Barra
(Bahrain) Twist	L
(Tunisia) Cranky	W
(Qatar) Salah	L
(South Africa) Benny	W
(Jordan) Somar	L
(South Africa) Toufeeq	W
(Lebanon) Ralph	L
(Egypt) Klash	W
(Saudi Arabia) Willy	L
(Algeria) D12	W
(Senegal) Abdallah	L
(Morocco) Yoriyas	W
(Oman) Engine	L

Quarter-finals
(Morocco) Wolf	W
(Algeria) Barra	L
(Tunisia) Cranky	L
(South Africa) Benny	W
(South Africa) Toufeeq	W
(Egypt) Klash	L
(Algeria) D12	W
(Morocco) Yoriyas	L

Semi-finals
(Morocco) Wolf	L
(South Africa) Benny	W
(South Africa) Toufeeq	W
(Algeria) D12	L

Final
(South Africa) Benny	W
(South Africa) Toufeeq	L
Third place

== 2013 ==
=== RBBC1 Middle East Africa 2013 results ===
Location: Amman, Jordan

Round of 16
(Morocco) Lil Zoo	W
(Qatar) Lil Salah	L
(Algeria) Iladis
(Lebanon) Ralph	W
(Morocco) Yoriyas	W
(Egypt) Charley Breaka	L
(Jordan) Isheh	W
(Kuwait) Hush	L
(Bahrain) Huey Flava	L
(South Africa) Benny	W
(Algeria) Omar	L
(Saudi Arabia) Willy	W
(Algeria) Chakal	W
(Oman) Engine	L
(Tunisia) Carbon	W
(Senegal) Binou	L

Quarter-finals
(Morocco) Lil Zoo	W
(Lebanon) Ralph	L
(Morocco) Yoriyas	W
(Jordan) Isheh	L
(South Africa) Benny	W
(Saudi Arabia) Willy	L
(Algeria) Chakal	W
(Tunisia) Carbon	L

Semi-finals
(Morocco) Lil Zoo	W
(Morocco) Yoriyas	L
(South Africa) Benny	W
(Algeria) Chakal	L

Final
(Morocco) Lil Zoo	W
(South Africa) Benny	L
Third place

== 2012 ==
=== RBBC1 Middle East Africa 2012 results ===
Location: Marrakesh, Morocco

Round of 16
(Kuwait) Zerock	W
(Tunisia) Tabouch	L
(Saudi Arabia) Lazy	L
(Morocco) Lil Zoo	W
(Qatar) Hamza	W
(Ivory Coast) Thumy	L
(Lebanon) Ralph	W
(Ghana) Bright	L
(Morocco) Yoriyas	W
(Bahrain) Zilla	L
(Algeria) Chakal	W
(Egypt) Klash	L
(Algeria) Abdallah	L
(South Africa) The Curse	W
(Qatar) Lil Salah	L
(Oman) Dark	W

Quarter-finals
(Kuwait) Zerock	L
(Morocco) Lil Zoo	W
(Qatar) Hamza	L
(Lebanon) Ralph	W
(Morocco) Yoriyas	L
(Algeria) Chakal	W
(South Africa) The Curse	L
(Oman) Dark	W

Semi-finals
(Morocco) Lil Zoo	W
(Lebanon) Ralph	L
(Algeria) Chakal	W
(Oman) Dark	L

Final
(Morocco) Lil Zoo	W
(Algeria) Chakal	L
Third place
