= National Foundation of Museums of Morocco =

Moroccan cultural foundation

National Foundation of Museums
- Abbreviation: FNM
- Formation: 2011; 15 years ago
- Type: Non-profit institution
- Headquarters: Rabat
- Region served: Morocco
- President: Mehdi Qotbi
- Website: fnm.ma

The National Foundation of Museums (FNM) is a Moroccan institution established in 2011 to manage, preserve, and promote the country’s museum heritage. Endowed with legal personality and financial autonomy, it is responsible for the administration of state-owned museums and the implementation of museum policy in Morocco.

== Missions ==
The National Foundation of Museums was created by Law No. 01-09 and promulgated by Dahir No. 1-10-21 of 14 Joumada I 1432 (18 April 2011). It is responsible for the management, preservation, and promotion of museum heritage, as well as expanding public access to museums. In this capacity, it is tasked with:

- conducting inventories and ensuring the archiving, conservation, and protection of museum heritage under its authority;
- contributing to the enrichment of museum collections;
- promoting professionalization within the museum sector;
- developing research in museology;
- contributing to training and continuing education in museum management;
- encouraging and facilitating public access to museums;
- establishing partnerships with individuals and organizations holding collections or heritage objects;
- contributing to the recovery of artworks illicitly exported, stolen, or transferred.

To carry out these missions, the Foundation has defined a strategic plan structured around several priorities:

- modernization of museums and their administrative and financial management;
- development of a national museum policy;
- implementation of museum creation and renovation programs;
- strengthening the role of museums in cultural, social, and economic development.

== Museums under the FNM ==
As of February 2014, fourteen museums were placed under the responsibility of the Foundation:

- the Archaeological Museum of Tétouan;
- the Ethnographic Museum Bab Okla of Tétouan;
- the Kasbah Museum (contemporary art space) in Tangier;
- the National Museum of Saharan Arts of Laâyoune;
- the Batha Museum in Fes;
- the Dar Jamaï Museum in Meknes;
- the Borj Belkari Museum in Meknes;
- the Dar El Bacha Museum in Marrakech;
- the Oudayas Museum in Rabat;
- the Archaeological Museum of Rabat;
- the Mohammed VI Museum of Modern and Contemporary Art;
- the Ethnographic Museum of Chefchaouen;
- the Dar Si Saïd Museum in Marrakech.
- the National Museum of Ceramics in Safi.

== Partnerships ==
=== National ===
The Foundation has established partnerships with several Moroccan institutions, including the Ministry of Youth, Culture and Communication, Royal Air Maroc, the National Tourism Office, the National Institute of Archaeology and Heritage (INSAP), the National Library of the Kingdom of Morocco (BNRM), and the Fondation mémoires pour l'avenir.

=== International ===
The Foundation has developed partnerships with several international institutions, including the Louvre Museum, the Museum of European and Mediterranean Civilisations (Mucem), and the Arab World Institute (IMA).

These collaborations have led to international exhibitions such as Splendors of Volubilis (2014), Morocco of a Thousand Colors at the Arab World Institute, and Medieval Morocco: An Empire from Africa to Spain at the Louvre.

Prospective cooperation has also been mentioned with American institutions such as the Smithsonian Institution, the Solomon R. Guggenheim Museum, and the Metropolitan Museum of Art.

== See also ==
- National Photography Museum (Morocco)
