= World BBoy Series =

Breakdancing championship

The Undisputed World B-Boy Series is a b-boy or breaking championship series established in 2013 that connects the renowned solo international b-boy competitions worldwide.

The Undisputed Masters. After the series has been concluded, mostly at the end the year, the champions of each competition meet in a masters event called "Undisputed Masters" and compete to establish who is the "Undisputed" champion.

The Undisputed Ranking is a ranking accumulating the top 16 results of each championship in the World B-Boy Series. The overall ranking leader if not a champion, is also invited to the Undisputed Masters. The ranking is also used to reward wildcards for competitors to compete in the Undisputed Masters.

== History ==
In 2007 Johnjay Chon and Charlie Shin creators of R-16 Korea took the initiative to organise annual conferences inviting stakeholders of the Breaking community. At these conferences top competitors, judges and promoters discussed topics such as the future of competition Breaking. In 2012 at the Red Bull BC One World Final in Rio de Janeiro the concept to unify the major world Breaking championships through an events series was initiated. In 2013 after a two-day conference in Berlin a group of promoters, high level competitors and competition judges created the Undisputed World B-Boy Series and the Undisputed Masters. The first Undisputed World B-Boy Series kicked off in March 2014 at Battle Pro in Paris. The events in the first Undisputed World B-Boy series were; R-16 Korea, Battle of the Year, Red Bull BC One, The Notorious IBE, UK B-Boy Championships, Freestyle Session and Outbreak Europe. The first Undisputed Masters took place on December 14, 2014, in London.

== Events in Undisputed World B-Boy Series ==
| Country | Name | City | Since | Event number |
|---|---|---|---|---|
| (France) | Chelles Battle Pro | Paris Marseille Toulouse Lille | 2014 | 1, 9, 17, 27, 36, 45 |
| (Slovakia) | Outbreak Europe | Banská Bystrica | 2014 | 3, 10, 20, 30, 39, 48 |
| (Netherlands) | The Notorious IBE | Heerlen | 2014 | 4, 11, 21, 31, 40, 49 |
| (France) | Battle of the Year | Braunschweig Essen Montpellier | 2014 | 5, 14, 23, 34, 43, 52 |
| (United Kingdom) | UK B-Boy Championships | London Birmingham | 2014 | 6, 18, 28, 47 |
| (United States) | Silverback Open Championships | Philadelphia | 2015 | 13, 22, 33, 42 |
| (Belgium) | Unbreakable | Antwerp | 2016 | 19, 29, 38, 50 |
| (Taiwan) | Taipei B-Boy City | Taipei | 2016 | 26, 35, 44, 54 |
| (United States) | Freestyle Session | Los Angeles San Diego | 2014 | 7, 15, 24, 32 |
| (China) | Green Panda Festival | Beijing Chongqing | 2018 | 41, 51 |
| (Czech Republic) | The Legits Blast Winter | Prague | 2018 | 37, 46 |
| (Sweden) | Nordic Qualifier | Malmö | 2019 | 53 |
| (South Korea) | R-16 Korea | South Korea | 2014 | 2, 12 |
| United Nations | Red Bull BC One | Paris Rome Nagoya | 2014 | 8, 16, 25 |

== Undisputed Masters winners 2014–2020 ==
| Edition | Location | Name winner | City |
|---|---|---|---|
| Undisputed Masters I (2014) | London, England | (France) Lilou | Lyon |
| Undisputed Masters II (2015) | Marseille, France | (United States) Victor | Kissimmee |
| Undisputed Masters III (2016) | Prague, Czech Republic | (United States) Thesis | Phoenix |
| Undisputed Masters IV (2017) | San Diego, United States | (United States) Victor | Kissimmee |
| Undisputed Masters V (2018) | Marrakesh, Morocco | (Canada) Phil Wizard | Vancouver |
| Undisputed Masters VI (2019) | Malmö, Sweden | (Denmark) Zoopreme | Copenhagen |
| Undisputed Masters VII (2020) | Cancelled due to COVID-19 | | |

== Past World B-Boy Series events ==
| # | Event | Location | Date | Winner (victories) |
Season 2019
| 54 | (Taiwan) Taipei BBoy City | Hualien City | 8 December 2019 | (Canada) Illz (1) |
| 53 | (Sweden) Nordic Qualifier | Malmö | 2 November 2019 | (Russia) Grom (1) |
| 52 | (France) Battle of the Year | Montpellier | 25 October 2019 | (United States) Zeku (1) |
| 51 | (China) Green Panda Festival | Beijing | 21 September 2019 | (Russia) Alkolil (2) |
| 50 | (Belgium) Unbreakable | Antwerp | 20 September 2019 | (Denmark) Zoopreme (1) |
| 49 | (Netherlands) The Notorious IBE | Heerlen | 11 August 2019 | (Canada) Phil Wizard (2) |
| 48 | (Slovakia) Outbreak Europe | Banská Bystrica | 27 July 2019 | (United States) Victor (8) |
| 47 | (United Kingdom) UK B-Boy Championships | London | 14 April 2019 | (United Kingdom) Kid Karam (1) |
| 46 | (Czech Republic) The Legits Blast Winter | Prague | 10 March 2019 | (United States) Victor (7) |
| 45 | (France) Paris Battle Pro | Paris | 24 February 2019 | (Venezuela) Lil G (2) |
Season 2018
| 44 | (Taiwan) Taipei BBoy City | Taipei | 1 December 2018 | (Greece) Onel (2) |
| 43 | (France) Battle of the Year | Montpellier | 16 November 2018 | (France) Dany (1) |
| 42 | (United States) Silverback Open | Philadelphia | 28 October 2018 | (United States) Victor (6) |
| 41 | (China) Green Panda | Beijing | 3 October 2018 | (Venezuela) Lil G (1) |
| 40 | (Netherlands) The Notorious IBE | Heerlen | 12 August 2018 | (Canada) Phil Wizard (1) |
| 39 | (Slovakia) Outbreak Europe | Banská Bystrica | 28 July 2018 | (Russia) Cheerito (1) |
| 38 | (Belgium) Unbreakable | Antwerp | 21 April 2018 | (United States) Stripes (1) |
| 37 | (Czech Republic) The Legits Blast Winter | Prague | 11 March 2018 | (Poland) Greku (1) |
| 36 | (France) Lille Battle Pro | Lille | 25 February 2018 | (Japan) Issei (5) |
Season 2017
| 35 | (Taiwan) Taipei BBoy City | Taipei | 2 December 2017 | (South Korea) Vero (1) |
| 34 | (Germany) Battle of the Year | Essen | 22 October 2017 | (Greece) Onel (1) |
| 33 | (United States) Silverback Open | Philadelphia | 7 October 2017 | (Japan) Issei (4) |
| 32 | (United States) Freestyle Session | San Diego | 27 August 2017 | (United States) Thesis (2) |
| 31 | (Netherlands) The Notorious IBE | Heerlen | 10 August 2017 | (Ukraine) Kuzya (3) |
| 30 | (Slovakia) Outbreak Europe | Banská Bystrica | 29 July 2017 | (United States) Victor (5) |
| 29 | (Belgium) Unbreakable | Antwerp | 30 April 2017 | (South Korea) Kill (1) |
| 28 | (United Kingdom) UK B-Boy Championships | London | 8 April 2017 | (United Kingdom) Sunni (3) |
| 27 | (France) Toulouse Battle Pro | Toulouse | 3 March 2017 | (Ukraine) Lussy Sky (1) |
Season 2016
| 26 | (Taiwan) Taipei BBoy City | Taipei | 17 December 2016 | (Japan) Issei (2) |
| 25 | (Japan) Red Bull BC One | Nagoya | 3 December 2016 | (Japan) Issei (3) |
| 24 | (United States) Freestyle Session | Los Angeles | 12 November 2016 | (United States) El Niño (3) |
| 23 | (Germany) Battle of the Year | Brunswick | | (Portugal) Bruce Almighty (1) |
| 22 | (United States) Silverback Open | Philadelphia | | (United States) Thesis (1) |
| 21 | (Netherlands) The Notorious IBE | Heerlen | | (United States) Victor (4) |
| 20 | (Slovakia) Outbreak Europe | Banská Bystrica | | (Ukraine) Kuzya (2) |
| 19 | (Belgium) Unbreakable | Antwerp | | (Ukraine) Kuzya (1) |
| 18 | (United Kingdom) UK B-Boy Championships | London | | (United Kingdom) Sunni (2) |
| 17 | (France) Marseilles Battle Pro | Marseille | | (France) Soso (1) |
Season 2015
| 16 | (Italy) Red Bull BC One | Rome | 14 November 2015 | (United States) Victor (3) |
| 15 | (United States) Freestyle Session | Los Angeles | 8 November 2015 | (United States) Victor (2) |
| 14 | (Germany) Battle of the Year | Brunswick | | (Netherlands) Menno (4) |
| 13 | (United States) Silverback Open | Philadelphia | | (United States) Victor (1) |
| 12 | (South Korea) R16 | Seoul | 12 September 2015 | (Netherlands) Menno (3) |
| 11 | (Netherlands) The Notorious IBE | Heerlen | | (United Kingdom) Sunni (1) |
| 10 | (Slovakia) Outbreak Europe | Banská Bystrica | | (United States) El Niño (2) |
| 9 | (France) Chelles Battle Pro | Chelles | | (France) Mounir |
Season 2014
| 8 | (France) Red Bull BC One | Paris | 29 November 2014 | (Netherlands) Menno (2) |
| 7 | (United States) Freestyle Session | Los Angeles | 8 to 9 November 2014 | (United States) El Niño (1) |
| 6 | (United Kingdom) UK B-Boy Championships | London | 25 to 26 October 2014 | (France) Lilou (1) |
| 5 | (Germany) Battle of the Year | Brunswick | 17 October 2014 | (Russia) Alkolil (1) |
| 4 | (Netherlands) The Notorious IBE | Heerlen | 8 to 10 August 2014 | (France) Tonio (1) |
| 3 | (Slovakia) Outbreak Europe | Banská Bystrica | 25 to 27 July 2014 | (Poland) Kleju (1) |
| 2 | (South Korea) R16 | Seoul | 4 to 6 July 2014 | (Japan) Issei (1) |
| 1 | (France) Chelles Battle Pro | Chelles | 28 February 2014 | (Netherlands) Menno (1) |

== Ranking & Winners ==
The championships on the Undisputed World B-Boy Series use a ranking system to rank its top 16 participants. Competitors are not limited to the number of events he or she can participate in.

=== Points for ranking ===
| Result | Points for ranking |
|---|---|
| Winner | 14 |
| Runner-up | 10 |
| Top 4 | 8 |
| Top 8 | 6 |
| Top 16 | 4 |

=== Ranking winners ===
| Year | Breaker | Points |
|---|---|---|
| 2019 | (Canada) Phil Wizard | 30 |
| 2018 | (Ukraine) Kuzya | 30 |
| 2017 | (Ukraine) Lussy Sky | 38 |
| 2016 | (United Kingdom) Sunni | 42 |
| 2015 | (United States) Victor | 54 |
| 2014 | (United States) Gravity | 38 |

== World BBoy Series 2019 / Undisputed Masters VI ==
To qualify for the Undisputed Masters VI, Breakers had to win 1 of 10 World B-Boy Series championships or win the Undisputed Ranking. Additional wildcards were rewarded to competitors based on their position on the Undisputed Ranking.

The Undisputed Masters VI was held in Malmö, Sweden on December 14, 2019.

| | Name | Qualification |
|---|---|---|
| 1 | (Venezuela) Lil G | Battle Pro Winner |
| 2 | (United States) Victor | Legits Winter Blast |
| 3 | (United States) Victor | Outbreak Europe Winner |
| 4 | (Canada) Phil Wizard | The Notorious IBE Winner |
| 5 | (United Kingdom) Kid Karam | UK BBoy Champs Winner |
| 6 | (Denmark) Zoopreme | Unbreakable Winner |
| 7 | (United States) Zeku | Battle of the Year Winner |
| 8 | (Russia) Alkolil | Green Panda Festival Winner |
| 9 | (Russia) Grom | Nordic Qualifier Winner |
| 10 | (Canada) Illz | Taipei BBoy City Winner |

Victor (United States) was unable to attend. 2 Wildcards were rewarded to: Nord Diamond (Russia) and Tawfiq (Netherlands) .

Judges:

- Roxrite ( (United States) )
- Narumi ( (Japan) )
- Lilou ( (France) )
- Jam One ( (Sweden) )
- Hong 10 ( (South Korea) )

Host & DJ:

- MC Mario Bee ( (Netherlands) )
- DJ Bles One ( (United States) )

=== Group phase ===
| | BBoy | Rounds Won | Votes |
|---|---|---|---|
| 1 | (Denmark) **Zoopreme** | 5 | 20 |
| 2 | (Canada) **Philwizard** | 4 | 22 |
| 3 | (Russia) **Alkolil** | 4 | 21 |
| 4 | (United States) **Zeku** | 4 | 16 |
| 5 | (Canada) **Illz** | 3 | 19 |
| 6 | (Russia) **Nord Diamond** | 3 | 19 |
| 7 | (Netherlands) **Tawfiq** | 3 | 11 |
| 8 | (United Kingdom) **Kid Karam** | 2 | 12 |
| 9 | (Venezuela) **Lil G** | 2 | 10 |
| 10 | (Russia) **Grom** | 0 | 4 |

=== Knockout stage ===
Individuals in bold won their respective battles.

Semi-finals
(Denmark) **Zoopreme** | **W**
(United States) Zeku | L
(Canada) Philwizzard | L
(Russia) **Alkolil** | **W**

Final
(Denmark) **Zoopreme** | **W**
(Russia) Alkolil | L

== World BBoy Series 2018 / Undisputed Masters V ==
To qualify for the Undisputed Masters, Breakers had to win 1 of the 9 World B-Boy Series championships. Additional wildcards were rewarded to competitors based on their position on the Undisputed Ranking.

The Undisputed Masters V was held in Marrakesh, Morocco on January 19, 2019.

| | Name | Qualification |
|---|---|---|
| 1 | (France) Dany Dann | Battle of the Year Winner |
| 2 | (Greece) Onel | Taipei BBoy City Winner |
| 3 | (Poland) Greku | The Legits Winter Blast Winner |
| 4 | (Canada) Phil Wizard | The Notorious IBE Winner |
| 5 | (Russia) Cheerito | Outbreak Winner |
| 6 | (Japan) Issei | Lille Battle Pro Winner |
| 7 | (Ukraine) Kuzya | Undisputed Ranking Winner |
| 8 | (Russia) Nord Diamond | Wildcard |
| 9 | (Morocco) Cri6 | Wildcard |

Stripes (United States) – winner of Unbreakable was unable to compete due to injury. He was replaced by Nord Diamond (Russia) .

Victor (United States) – winner Unbreakable Silverback Open Championship was unable to attend. He was replaced by Cri6 (Morocco) , winner of the local Moroccan Undisputed wild card battle.

Judges:

- Lagaet ( (Portugal) )
- Freeze ( (Sweden) )
- Mounir ( (France) )
- Lil Zoo ( (Morocco) )
- Movie1 ( (Spain) )

Host & DJ:

- Mario Bee ( (Netherlands) )
- Renegade ( (United Kingdom) )

=== Group phase ===
Group 1

| | BBoy | Wins | Rounds | Votes |
|---|---|---|---|---|
| 1 | (Canada) **Phil Wizard** | **2** | **5** | **20** |
| 2 | (Japan) **Issei** | **1** | **4** | **20** |
| 3 | (Morocco) Cri6 | 0 | 0 | 5 |

Group 2

| | Breaker | Wins | Rounds | Votes |
|---|---|---|---|---|
| 1 | (Russia) **Cheerito** | **2** | **4** | **20** |
| 2 | (Poland) Greku | 1 | 4 | 18 |
| 3 | (France) Dany Dann | 0 | 1 | 7 |

Group 3

| | Breaker | Wins | Rounds | Votes |
|---|---|---|---|---|
| C1 | (Ukraine) **Kuzya** | **2** | **6** | **22** |
| C2 | (Russia) Nord Diamond | 1 | 2 | 16 |
| C3 | (Greece) Onel | 0 | 1 | 7 |

Group winners Phil Wizard, Cheerito, Kuzya and best runner-up Issei qualified for Knock Out stage.

=== Knockout stage ===
Individuals in bold won their respective battles.

Semi-finals
(Canada) **Phil Wizard** | **W**
(Russia) Cheerito | L
(Japan) Issei | L
(Ukraine) **Kuzya** | **W**

Final
(Canada) **Phil Wizard** | **W**
(Ukraine) Kuzya | L

== World BBoy Series 2017 / Undisputed Masters IV ==
To qualify for the Undisputed Masters, Breakers had to win 1 of the 9 World B-Boy Series championships. Additional wildcards were rewarded to Breakers based on their position on the Undisputed Ranking.

The Undisputed Masters IV was held in San Diego, California on January 27 and 28 of 2018.

| | Name | Qualification |
|---|---|---|
| 1 | (Ukraine) Lussy Sky | Battle Pro Winner |
| 2 | (Ukraine) Kuzya | IBE Winner |
| 3 | (United Kingdom) Spin | Wildcard |
| 4 | (Mexico) Dr. Hill | Wildcard |
| 5 | (United States) Victor | Outbreak Winner |
| 6 | (Greece) Onel | BOTY Winner |
| 7 | (South Korea) Vero | TBC Winner |
| 8 | (Japan) Issei | Silverback Open Winner |
| 9 | (United States) Thesis | Freestyle Sessions Winner |

Sunni (United Kingdom) – winner of UK Champs was unable to obtain a US Visa. He was replaced by Spin (United Kingdom) .

Kill – winner Unbreakable was unable to attend due to military service in Korea. He was replaced by Dr. Hill (Mexico) .

Judges:

- Storm ( (Germany) )
- Flo Master ( (United States) )
- Roxrite ( (United States) )
- Moy ( (United States) )
- Bojin ( (Taiwan) )

Host & DJ:

- Ivan the urban actionfigure ( (United States) )
- Lean Rock ( (United States) )

=== Group phase ===
Group A

| Seed | Breaker | Wins | Rounds | Votes |
|---|---|---|---|---|
| A1 | (United States) **Thesis** | **2** | **5** | **22** |
| A2 | (South Korea) **Vero** | **1** | **4** | **18** |
| A3 | (Greece) Onel | 0 | 0 | 5 |

Group B

| Seed | Breaker | Wins | Rounds | Votes |
|---|---|---|---|---|
| B1 | (United States) **Victor** | **2** | **5** | **24** |
| B2 | (Mexico) Dr. Hill | 1 | 3 | 14 |
| B3 | (Ukraine) Lussy Sky | 0 | 1 | 7 |

Group C

| Seed | Breaker | Wins | Rounds | Votes |
|---|---|---|---|---|
| C1 | (Japan) **Issei** | **2** | **6** | **28** |
| C2 | (Ukraine) Kuzya | 1 | 2 | 12 |
| C3 | (United Kingdom) Spin | 0 | 1 | 5 |

Group winners Thesis, Victor, Issei and best runner-up Vero qualified for Knock Out stage.

=== Knockout stage ===
Individuals in bold won their respective battles.

Semi-finals
(United States) Thesis | L
(South Korea) **Vero** | **W**
(United States) **Victor** | **W**
(Japan) Issei | L

Final
(South Korea) Vero | L
(United States) **Victor** | **W**

== World BBoy Series 2016 / Undisputed Masters III ==
To qualify for the Undisputed Masters, Breakers had to win 1 of the 10 World B-Boy Series championships. Additional wildcards were rewarded to Breakers based on their position on the Undisputed Ranking.

The 2016 Undisputed Masters III event was held in Prague, Czech Republic.

| Rank | Name | Qualification |
|---|---|---|
| 1 | (Japan) Issei | Red Bull BC One and Taipei Bboy City Winner |
| 2 | (United Kingdom) Sunni | UK Championships Winner and Ranking Winner |
| 3 | (Ukraine) Kuzya | Unbreakable and Outbreak Europe Winner |
| 4 | (Portugal) Bruce Almighty | Battle of the Year Winner |
| 5 | (United States) Victor | IBE Winner |
| 6 | (Poland) Kleju | Wildcard |
| 7 | (United States) El Niño | Freestyle Session Winner |
| 8 | (United States) Thesis | Silverback Open Winner |
| 9 | (France) Soso | Marseille Battle Pro Winner |
| 10 | (Netherlands) Kid Colombia | Wildcard |

Sunni ( (United Kingdom) ) was unable to compete due to injury days before the event, he was replaced by Kid Colombia ( (Netherlands) ) on the day of the Undisputed Masters III. Taisuke ( (Japan) ) was unable to compete he was replaced by Kleju ( (Poland) ).

Judges:

- Moy ( (United States) )
- Storm ( (Germany) )
- Renegade ( (United Kingdom) )
- Freeze ( (Sweden) )
- Mounir ( (France) )

Host & DJ:

- MC Mario Bee ( (Netherlands) )
- MC Pablo ( (Slovenia) )
- DJ Lean Rock ( (United States) )

=== Group phase ===
| Pos | Breaker | Wins | Rounds |
|---|---|---|---|
| 1 | (Poland) **Kleju** | **3** | **9** |
| 2 | (Japan) **Issei** | **3** | **9** |
| 3 | (United States) **Thesis** | **3** | **7** |
| 4 | (Portugal) **Bruce Almighty** | **2** | **5** |
| 5 | (Ukraine) Kuzya | 1 | 5 |
| 6 | (United States) Victor | 1 | 4 |
| 7 | (United States) El Niño | 1 | 4 |
| 8 | (United Kingdom) Sunni | 1 | 3 |
| 9 | (Netherlands) Kid Colombia | 0 | 0 |
| 10 | (France) Soso | 0 | 0 |

=== Knockout stage ===
Individuals in bold won their respective battles.

Semi-finals
(United States) **Thesis** | **2**
(Poland) Kleju | 0
(Japan) **Issei** | **2**
(Portugal) Bruce Almighty | 0

Final
(United States) **Thesis** | **2**
(Japan) Issei | 1

== World BBoy Series 2015 / Undisputed Masters II ==
To qualify for the Undisputed Masters, Breakers had to win 1 of the 8 World B-Boy Series championships or win the Undisputed Ranking. Additional wildcards were rewarded to competitors based on their position on the Undisputed Ranking.

The Undisputed Masters II took place in Marseille, France on Saturday, December 12, 2015.

| Name | Qualification |
|---|---|
| (United States) Victor | Silverback Open Championships, Freestyle Session, and Red Bull BC One winner |
| (Netherlands) Menno | R-16 Korea and Battle of the Year winner |
| (France) Mounir | Chelles Battle Pro winner |
| (Poland) Kleju | Wildcard |
| (Russia) Alkolil | Wildcard |
| (Canada) Fleau | Wildcard |
| (Poland) Thomaz | Wildcard |
| (Netherlands) Kid Colombia | Wildcard |

WildcardsIssei ( (Japan) ) the Undisputed Ranking winner was unavailable to compete. El Niño ( (United States) ) winner of Outbreak Europe and Kareem ( (United States) ) invited through a wildcard both got injured prior to the competition. Sunni ( (United Kingdom) ), the Notorious IBE winner, was also ruled out due to an injury one day before the event. Wildcards based on ranking positions were rewarded to; Kid Colombia( (Netherlands) ), Thomasz( (Poland) ), Fleau( (Canada) ), Alkolil( (Russia) ), Kleju( (Poland) ),

Judges:

- Cros 1 ( (United States) )
- Lilou ( (France) )
- Kareem ( (United States) )
- Storm ( (Germany) )
- Focus ( (Finland) )

Host & DJ:

- MC Mario Bee ( (Netherlands) )
- DJ Renegade ( (United Kingdom) )

=== Group phase ===
Group A

| Seed | Breaker | Wins | Rounds | Votes |
|---|---|---|---|---|
| A4 | (Netherlands) **Kid Colombia** | **2** | **6** | **28** |
| A3 | (Russia) **Alkolil** | **2** | **6** | **27** |
| A1 | (Netherlands) Menno | 2 | 6 | 25 |
| A2 | (Poland) Thomaz | 0 | 0 | 10 |

Group B

| Seed | Bboy | Wins | Rounds | Votes |
|---|---|---|---|---|
| B1 | (United States) **Victor** | **2** | **6** | **31** |
| B2 | (Poland) **Kleju** | **2** | **6** | **26** |
| B4 | (France) Mounir | 1 | 4 | 23 |
| B3 | (Canada) Fleau | 1 | 2 | 10 |

=== Knockout stage ===
Individuals in bold won their respective battles.

Semi-finals
(Netherlands) Kid Colombia | L
(Poland) **Kleju** | **W**
(United States) **Victor** | **W**
(Russia) Alkolil | L

Final
(United States) **Victor** | **W**
(Poland) Kleju | L

== World BBoy Series 2014 / Undisputed Masters I ==
To qualify for the Undisputed Masters, Breakers had to win 1 of the 9 World B-Boy Series championships or win the Undisputed Ranking. Additional wildcards were rewarded to competitors based on their position on the Undisputed Ranking.

The 2014 Undisputed Masters I was held in London, England on Sunday, December 14, 2014.

| Name | Qualification |
|---|---|
| (Netherlands) Menno | Chelles Battle Pro and Red Bull BC One winner |
| (Japan) Issei | R16 Korea winner |
| (Poland) Kleju | Outbreak Europe winner |
| (Russia) Alcolil | Battle of the Year winner |
| (France) Lilou | UK Championships winner |
| (United States) El Niño | Freestyle Session winner |
| (United States) Gravity | Undisputed Ranking winner |
| (United Kingdom) Spin | Wildcard |

Tonio ( (France) ) winner of The Notorious IBE had to withdraw due to visa complications, he was replaced by Spin ( (United Kingdom) ).

Judges:

- Storm ( (Germany) )
- Niek ( (Netherlands) )
- Renegade ( (United Kingdom) )
- Lamine ( (France) )
- Roxrite ( (United States) )

Host & DJ:

- MC Mario Bee ( (Netherlands) )
- DJ Lean Rock ( (United States) )

=== Group phase ===
Group A

| Seed | Bboy | Wins | Rounds |
|---|---|---|---|
| A2 | (Netherlands) **Menno** | **3** | **9** |
| A4 | (United States) **Niño** | **2** | **5** |
| A1 | (Poland) Kleju | 1 | 3 |
| A3 | (United Kingdom) Spin | 0 | 1 |

Group B

| Seed | Bboy | Wins | Rounds |
|---|---|---|---|
| B3 | (France) **Lilou** | **2** | **6** |
| B2 | (Russia) **Alkolil** | **2** | **6** |
| B1 | (United States) Gravity | 1 | 4 |
| B4 | (Japan) Issei | 1 | 2 |

=== Knockout stage ===
Individuals in bold won their respective battles.

Semi-finals
(France) **Lilou** | **W**
(United States) El Niño | L
(Netherlands) **Menno** | **W**
(Russia) Alkolil | L

Final
(France) **Lilou** | **W**
(Netherlands) Menno | L

== Partnerships & Brand Involvements ==
Dance Federations:

- UDEF, Urban Dance & Educational Foundation, Philadelphia, USA.
- CTDSF Chinese Taipei Dance Sport Federation
- WDSF, World Dance Sport Federation
- Belgian Dance Sport Federation
- USA Dance

Cities and cultural funding organisations:

- Sweden, City of Malmö
- Czech Republic: US Embassy, Visegrand Fond
- Taipei: New Taipei City,
- The Netherlands: City of Heerlen, Province of Limburg, Fonds voor Cultuurparticipatie, Fonds Podiumkunsten
- Belgium: City of Antwerp, Danssport Vlaanderen, Topsport Vlaanderen
- Slovakia: City and region of Banská Bystrica
- Morocco: French Institute Marrakesh, Royal Federation of Sports, Aerobic, Fitness and Dance Morocco
- Germany: Goethe Institut, French Institute, US Embassy, British Council, Stiftung Braunschweiger Kulturbesitz, Lotto Sportstiftung, Kulturstiftung des Bundes
- Korea: Korea Tourism Board
- United States: Pennsylvania Department of Community & Economic Development, Silverback Educational Foundation for the Arts, Dance & Athletics, The Mural Arts of Philadelphia, Multicultural Community Family Services

Brand involvement:

- Red Bull, Monster Energy, Relentless, Puma, Jack & Jones, JBL, New Era, Jägermeister, G-Shock, Snipes, Sony Ericcson, New Yorker, Korea Tourism Organisation, Bank SinoPac, Rabobank

Media Partners:

- New Dance Media Amsterdam, Stance TV Los Angeles, The Legits Studios Slovakia, Red Bull Media House, BBoy Network USA
