= L'Uzine =

L’Uzine لوزين
- Location: 19 Blvd. Mouatamid Ibnou Abbad, Richbond, Aïn Sebaâ, Casablanca, Morocco
- Coordinates: 33.6048°N 7.5467°W
- Website: luzine.ma

L’Uzine (Arabic: لوزين, French: L’Uzine, "the factory") is an art and culture space in the industrial zone of Aïn Sebaâ in Casablanca, Morocco. The Touria and Abdelaziz Tazi Foundation founded L'Uzine in 2014. Activities hosted at L'Uzine have included concerts, art exhibitions, film screenings, workshops, seminars and debates, and dance and theatrical performances.

== Activities ==
Chbe3 Fen f’ Ramdan (شبع فن فرمضان) is an annual art and culture program that takes place during Ramadan.

Cypher is a breakdancing competition organized by Yoriyas.
