= Chelles Battle Pro =

Annual competition series in France

Chelles Battle Pro was created in 2001 and it is held every year in Chelles, France. There are two competitions. One is a kids competition for solo b-boys and b-girls who are 12 years old or younger. The other competition is a knock-out tournament for eight b-boy crews. Some crews have to qualify at their country's local tournament; others are invited straight to the finale.

In 2014, Chelles Battle Pro is partnering up with Undisputed to create The Undisputed World BBoy Series, the world's first B-Boying series connecting different events around the globe, one of which is Battle Pro. The winner of Battle Pro 1 vs 1 joins the other champions from other international events in the series to meet in the Undisputed Masters event and battle to establish who is the supreme champion, who is “Undisputed”.

== Winners ==
Year	Crew Winner	Runner-up	Undisputed Winner
2021	(Japan) Body Carnival	(France) Last Squad	(Japan) Sho
2019	(United States) (South Korea) (France) (Brazil) (Morocco) Red Bull BC One All-Stars	(Russia) OBC	(Venezuela) Lil G
2018	(South Korea) Gamblerz	(France) Arabiq Flavour	(Japan) Issei
2017	(France) Vagabonds	(United Nations) Red Bull BC One All-Stars	(Ukraine) Lussy Sky
2016	(Portugal) Momentum Crew	(France) Arabiq Flavour	(France) Soso
2015	(France) Infamous	(Ukraine) EastSide Bboys	(France) Mounir
2014	(France) Team Rhône Alpes	(South Korea) Gamblerz	(Netherlands) Menno
2013	(South Korea) Jinjo Crew	(France) Ici C'est Paris	
2012	(South Korea) Fusion MC	(United States) Havikoro	
2011	(France) Pockemon	(Russia) Top 9	
2010	(France) Vagabonds	(Russia) Predatorz	
2009	(United States) Bboyworld Team	(France) Sans Limite	
2008	Ukraine Dream Team	(United States) Powerful Impact	
2007	(United States) Bboyworld Team	(France) Sans Limite	
2006	(United States) Flexible Flav	(France) Vagabonds	
2005	(France) Pockemon	(France) Allience	

== 2018 Results ==
=== 2018 Crew Battle 8 on 8 Results ===
Location: Lille, France

Crews in bold won their respective battles.

Quarter-finals
(Japan) **Body Carnival**	**W**
(Belgium) Funky Belgianz	L
(South Korea) **Gamblerz**	**W**
(Ukraine) East Side Bboys	L
(Russia) **Predatorz**	**W**
(Netherlands) HFC	L
(France) **Arabiq Flavour**	**W**
(Brazil) Mega Breaks	L

Semi-finals
(Japan) Body Carnival	L
(South Korea) **Gamblerz**	**W**
(Russia) Predatoz	L
(France) **Arabiq Flavor**	**W**

Final
(South Korea) **Gamblerz**	**W**
(France) Arabiq Flavor	L

== 2017 Results ==
=== 2017 Crew Battle 8 on 8 Results ===
Location: Toulouse, France

Crews in bold won their respective battles.

Quarter-finals
(France) **Vagabonds**	**W**
(Greece) Dead Prezz	L
(Brazil) **MOS Crew**	**W**
(South Korea) Soul Burnz	L
(United Nations) **Red Bull BC One All-Star**	**W**
(Germany) Too Much Underground	L
(Taiwan) Dream Runnerz	L
(Russia) **OBC**	**W**

Semi-finals
(France) **Vagabonds**	**W**
(Brazil) MOS Crew	L
(United Nations) **Red Bull BC One All-Star**	**W**
(Russia) OBC	L

Final
(France) **Vagabonds**	**W**
(United Nations) Red Bull BC One All-Star	L

=== 2017 Undisputed Battle 1 on 1 Results ===
Location: Toulouse, France

Individuals in bold won their respective battles.

Round of 16
(Ukraine) **Lussy Sky**	**W**
(Greece) Onel	L
(Netherlands) **Justeen**	**W**
(South Korea) Lunatic	L
(Mexico) **Hill**	**W**
(China) Sniper	L
(United Kingdom) **Kid Karam**	**W**
(Moldova) Sofiane	L
(Russia) **Deny Rock**	**W**
(Morocco) Simo	L
(Germany) **Double D**	**W**
(South Korea) Eagle One	L
(France) **Tonio**	**W**
(Austria) Miracle Smile	L
(Brazil) **Leony**	**W**
(Switzerland) Wen	L

Quarter-finals
(Ukraine) **Lussy Sky**	**W**
(Netherlands) Justeen	L
(Mexico) **Hill**	**W**
(United Kingdom) Kid Karam	L
(Russia) **Deny Rock**	**W**
(Germany) Double D	L
(France) **Tonio**	**W**
(Brazil) Leony	L

Semi-finals
(Ukraine) **Lussy Sky**	**W**
(Mexico) Hill	L
(Russia) **Deny Rock**	**W**
(France) Tonio	L

Final
(Ukraine) **Lussy Sky**	**W**
(Russia) Deny Rock	L
Third place

== 2016 Results ==
=== 2016 Crew Battle 8 on 8 Results ===
Location: Marseille, France

Crews in bold won their respective battles.

Quarter-finals
(Portugal) **Momentum**	**W**
(Taiwan) Future Crew	L
(Japan) **Body Carnival**	**W**
(Russia) UFO Techniques	L
(France) **Arabiq Flavor**	**W**
(Brazil) Still Contact Break	L
(Algeria) AWA Crew	L
(South Korea) **MB Crew**	**W**

Semi-finals
(Portugal) **Momentum**	**W**
(Japan) Body Carnival	L
(France) **Arabiq Flavor**	**W**
(South Korea) MB Crew	L

Final
(Portugal) **Momentum**	**W**
(France) Arabiq Flavor	L

=== 2016 Undisputed Battle 1 on 1 Results ===
Location: Marseille, France

Individuals in bold won their respective battles.

Round of 16
(France) **Soso**	**W**
(Switzerland) Yu Seng	L
(United Kingdom) **Sunni**	**W**
(Italy) Yaio	L
(France) **Lil Kev**	**W**
(France) Mokhtar	L
(Russia) **Beetle**	**W**
(Venezuela) Salo	L
(Germany) **Flexholik**	**W**
(Ukraine) Gimnast	L
(France) **Pac Pac**	**W**
(Norway) Daniel	L
(Ukraine) **Tip Top T**	**W**
(France) Arthur	L
(Spain) **Xak**	**W**
(Portugal) Bruce Almighty	L

Quarter-finals
(France) **Soso**	**W**
(United Kingdom) Sunni	L
(France) **Lil Kev**	**W**
(Russia) Beetle	L
(Germany) **Flexholik**	**W**
(France) Pac Pac	L
(Ukraine) **Tip Top T**	**W**
(Spain) Xak	L

Semi-finals
(France) **Soso**	**W**
(France) Lil Kev	L
(Germany) **Flexholik**	**W**
(Ukraine) Tip Top T	L

Final
(France) **Soso**	**W**
(Germany) Flexholik	L
Third place

== 2015 Results ==
=== 2015 Crew Battle 8 on 8 Results ===
Location: Chelles, France

Crews in bold won their respective battles.

Quarter-finals
(France) **Infamous**	**W**
(Greece) Black Out	L
(Taiwan) HRC	L
(Brazil) **DF Zulu Breakers**	**W**
(Ukraine) **EastSide Bboys**	**W**
(Belarus) Tigerz Crew	L
(Germany) Gorilla Legion	L
(South Korea) **Fusion MC**	**W**

Semi-finals
(France) **Infamous**	**W**
(Brazil) DF Zulu Breakers	L
(Ukraine) **EastSide Bboys**	**W**
(South Korea) Fusion MC	L

Final
(France) **Infamous**	**W**
(Ukraine) EastSide Bboys	L

=== 2015 Undisputed Battle 1 on 1 Results ===
B-boys in bold won their respective battles.

Quarter-finals
(France) **Mounir**	**W**
(Spain) V.O.	L
(Belarus) Taz	L
(Ukraine) **Cherep**	**W**
(Netherlands) **Jazzy**	**W**
(Taiwan) Chenchen	L
(South Korea) TKO	L
(Italy) **Kacyo**	**W**

Semi-finals
(France) **Mounir**	**W**
(Ukraine) Cherep	L
(Netherlands) **Jazzy**	**W**
(Italy) Kacyo	L

Final
(France) **Mounir**	**W**
(Netherlands) Jazzy	L

== 2014 Results ==
=== 2014 Crew Battle 8 on 8 Results ===
Location: Chelles, France

Crews in bold won their respective battles.

Quarter-finals
(France) **Team Rhône Alpes**	**W**
(Ukraine) EastSide Bboys	L
(United States) Team USA	L
(Brazil) **DF Zulu Breakers**	**W**
(Taiwan) **The Future Crew**	**W**
(United Nations) Team Worldwide	L
(Netherlands) The Ruggeds	L
(South Korea) **Gamblerz**	**W**

Semi-finals
(France) **Team Rhône Alpes**	**W**
(Brazil) DF Zulu Breakers	L
(Taiwan) The Future Crew	L
(South Korea) **Gamblerz**	**W**

Final
(France) **Team Rhône Alpes**	**W**
(South Korea) Gamblerz	L

=== 2014 Undisputed Battle 1 on 1 Results ===
Location: Chelles, France

Individuals in bold won their respective battles.

Round of 16
(Netherlands) **Menno**	**W**
(South Africa) Benny	L
(Morocco) **Cri6**	**W**
(Russia) Liquid Man	L
(Ukraine) **Kolobok**	**W**
(Brazil) Luan	L
(Spain) **Chey**	**W**
(Taiwan) Azone	L
(South Korea) **Zoot**	**W**
(Moldova) Toleek	L
(Japan) **Kazuki Rock**	**W**
(France) Willy	L
(United States) **Kareem**	**W**
(Germany) Omar	L
(Venezuela) **Lil G**	**W**
(Belgium) Admiracles	L

Quarter-finals
(Netherlands) **Menno**	**W**
(Morocco) Cri6	L
(Ukraine) **Kolobok**	**W**
(Spain) Chey	L
(South Korea) **Zoot**	**W**
(Japan) Kazuki Rock	L
(United States) **Kareem**	**W**
(Venezuela) Lil G	L

Semi-finals
(Netherlands) **Menno**	**W**
(Ukraine) Kolobok	L
(South Korea) Zoot	L
(United States) **Kareem**	**W**

Final
(Netherlands) **Menno**	**W**
(United States) Kareem	L
Third place

Due to flight complications, C-Lil ( (Laos) ) was not able to attend and was replaced by Cri6 ( (Morocco) ). Menno ( (Netherlands) ) earned the first bid to the Undisputed World BBoy Series at the end of the 2014 year by winning Chelles Pro.

== 2013 Results ==
=== 2013 Crew Battle 8 on 8 Results ===
Location: Chelles, France

Crews in bold won their respective battles.

Quarter-finals
(South Korea) **Jinjo**	**W**
(Russia) Mafia 13/BMT	L
DreamTeam Venezuela	L
(Russia) / (Ukraine) **Top EastSide Dogz**	**W**
(Portugal) **Momentum**	**W**
(United States) BboyWorld Team	L
(Taiwan) Double Kill	L
(France) **Ici C'est Paris**	**W**

Semi-finals
(South Korea) **Jinjo**	**W**
(Russia) / (Ukraine) Top EastSide Dogz	L
(Portugal) Momentum	L
(France) **Ici C'est Paris**	**W**

Final
(South Korea) **Jinjo**	**W**
(France) Ici C'est Paris	L

== 2012 Results ==
=== 2012 Crew Battle 8 on 8 Results ===
Location: Chelles, France

Crews in bold won their respective battles.

Quarter-finals
(South Korea) **Fusion MC**	**W**
(Spain) Universo Bboy	L
(Germany) Dream Team	L
(Japan) **Body Carnival**	**W**
(United States) **Havikoro**	**W**
(European Union) All School Team	L
(France) **BBF Team**	**W**
(Ukraine) South Front	L

Semi-finals
(South Korea) **Fusion MC**	**W**
(Japan) Body Carnival	L
(United States) **Havikoro**	**W**
(France) BBF Team	L

Final
(South Korea) **Fusion MC**	**W**
(United States) Havikoro	L
