= Museum of History and Civilizations =

Coordinates: 34°00′49″N 6°49′53″W

- ⵜⴰⵙⵏⵏⵉⵖⵜ ⵏ ⵓⵎⵣⵔⵓⵢ ⴷ ⵜⵖⵔⵎⵉⵡⵉⵏ
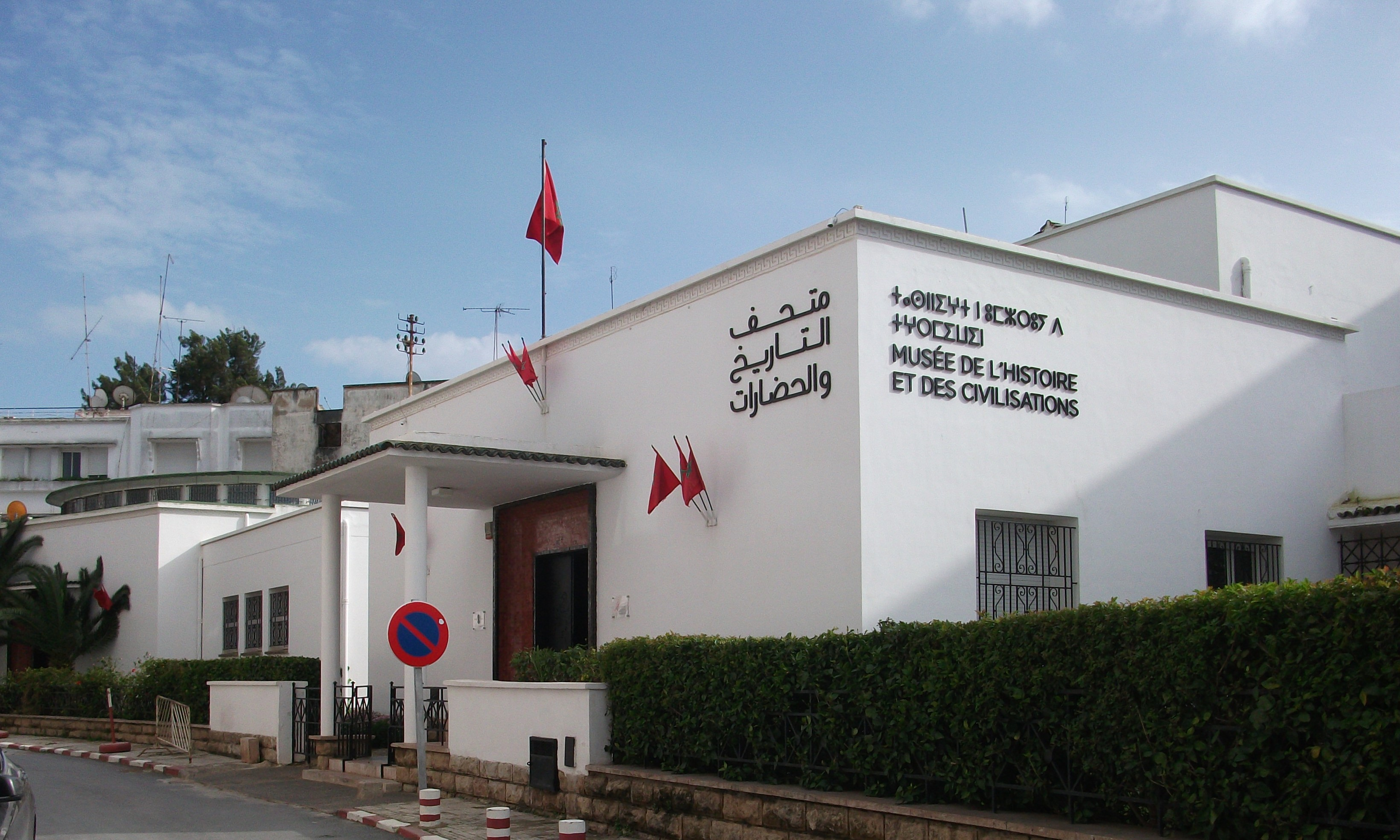
- Museum of History, Rabat
- Established: 1932; 94 years ago
- Location: Av. Moulay Abdelaziz; Rabat, Morocco
- Type: Archaeological museum
- Key holdings: Bust of Juba II; Bust of Cato; Roman-Amazigh sculptures & artefacts
- Collections: Prehistoric; Roman; Islamic
- Collection size: ~550

The Museum of History and Civilizations (Arabic: متحف التاريخ والحضارات, romanized: Matḥaf al-Tārīkh wa-al-Haḍārāt, French: Musée de l'histoire et des civilisations) is a national archaeological museum in Rabat, capital of Morocco. Open since 1932, its known for holding the most extensive collection of archaeological artefacts found in the kingdom, most notably a bust of the famous Amazigh king Juba II.

The museum's collections range from prehistory to the Islamic eras, connected through a Roman period evidenced by ancient marble and bronze sculptures found in Morocco.

== History ==
Originally the Rabat Archaeological Museum, the core structure was built in the 1920s under the French protectorate to house the Service des Antiquités du Protectorat, a colonial government institution. In 1930, the decision to transform the building into a nationwide archaeological museum would see a major transfer of artefacts to Rabat, many of which had been largely uncovered in Volubilis and Chellah, following systemic excavations initiated in 1915 by Marshal Lyautey. Subsequently, new showrooms were built around the administrative nucleus to organize collections. By 1957, the building sat in its final architectural form.

Since 2014, the museum has been under the care and protection of the National Foundation of Museums. After a year-long period of closure prompted by renovations, the museum was reopened to the public under its current name in April 12, 2017. The budget of the restoration project was 5.5 million Moroccan dirhams.

== Mission ==
Beyond the preservation of rare ancient art, the museum brings into light far earlier periods of Moroccan history that are less familiar (and often misunderstood) to much of the general public. The museum encourages in particular Moroccans to visit, as explained by museum curator Fatima-Zahra Chbiri at the 2017 reopening:

"I especially invite the Moroccan public to visit the new museum. The patrimony exhibited here is largely unknown, particularly among Moroccan [citizens]."

== Collections ==
The museum can be organised into three eras, displayed across three rooms, a patio, and a garden. All artefacts were exclusively discovered at archaeological sites in Morocco.

=== Prehistory ===
Attest to the first human settlements in Morocco, dating from 3,000 BCE to the Neolithic period.

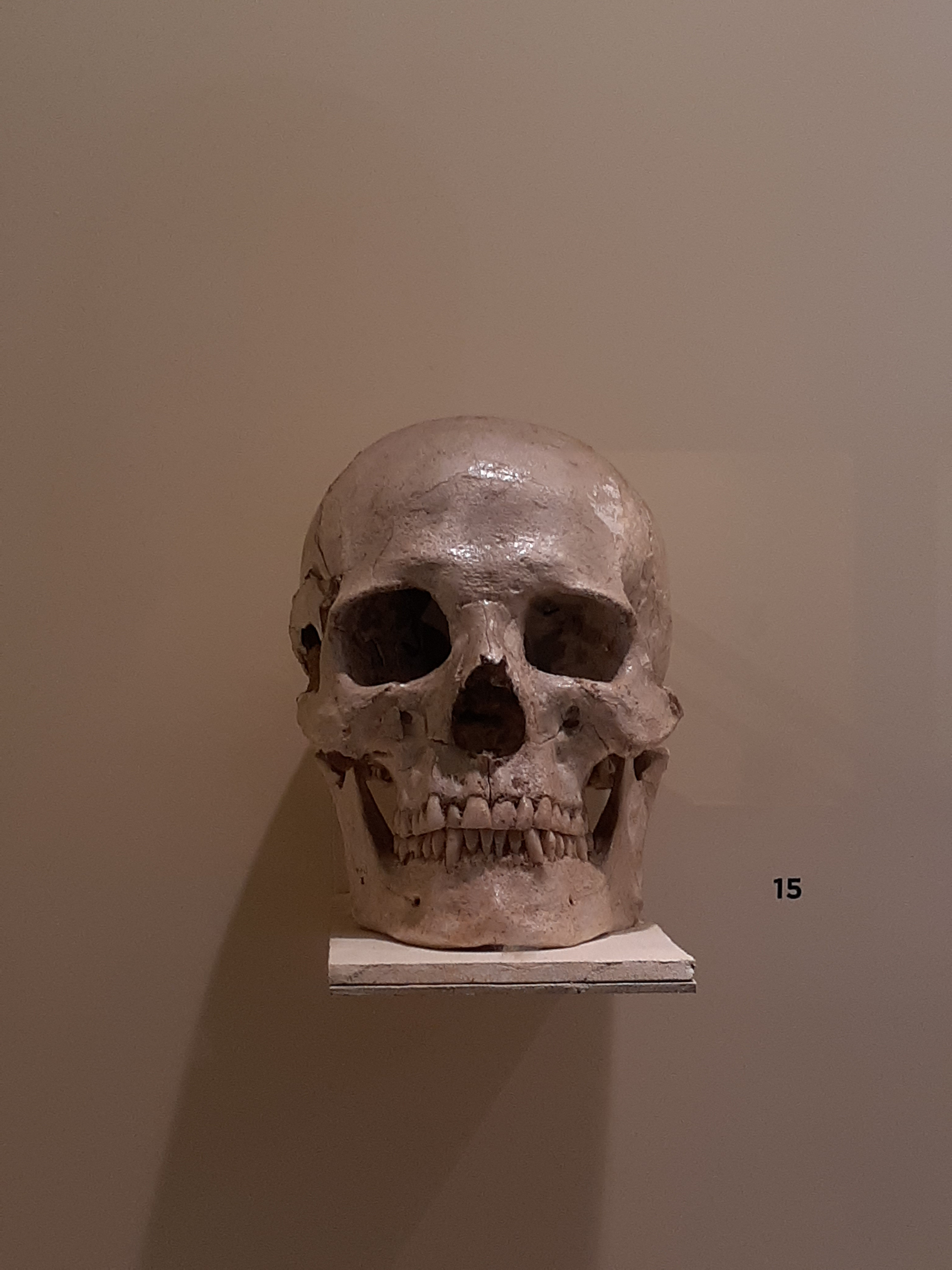
human skull

=== Antiquity (chronological) ===
- Phoenician period: Early Mediterranean trade and religious influence.
- Mauretanian period: Indigenous North African kingdom; cultural and political peak during Juba II and Cleopatra Selene II.
- Roman period: Mauretania as part of the Roman Empire (Province of Mauretania Tingitana).

The Roman period is the largest section of the museum, to which two areas are dedicated:

=== Hall of Marbles ===
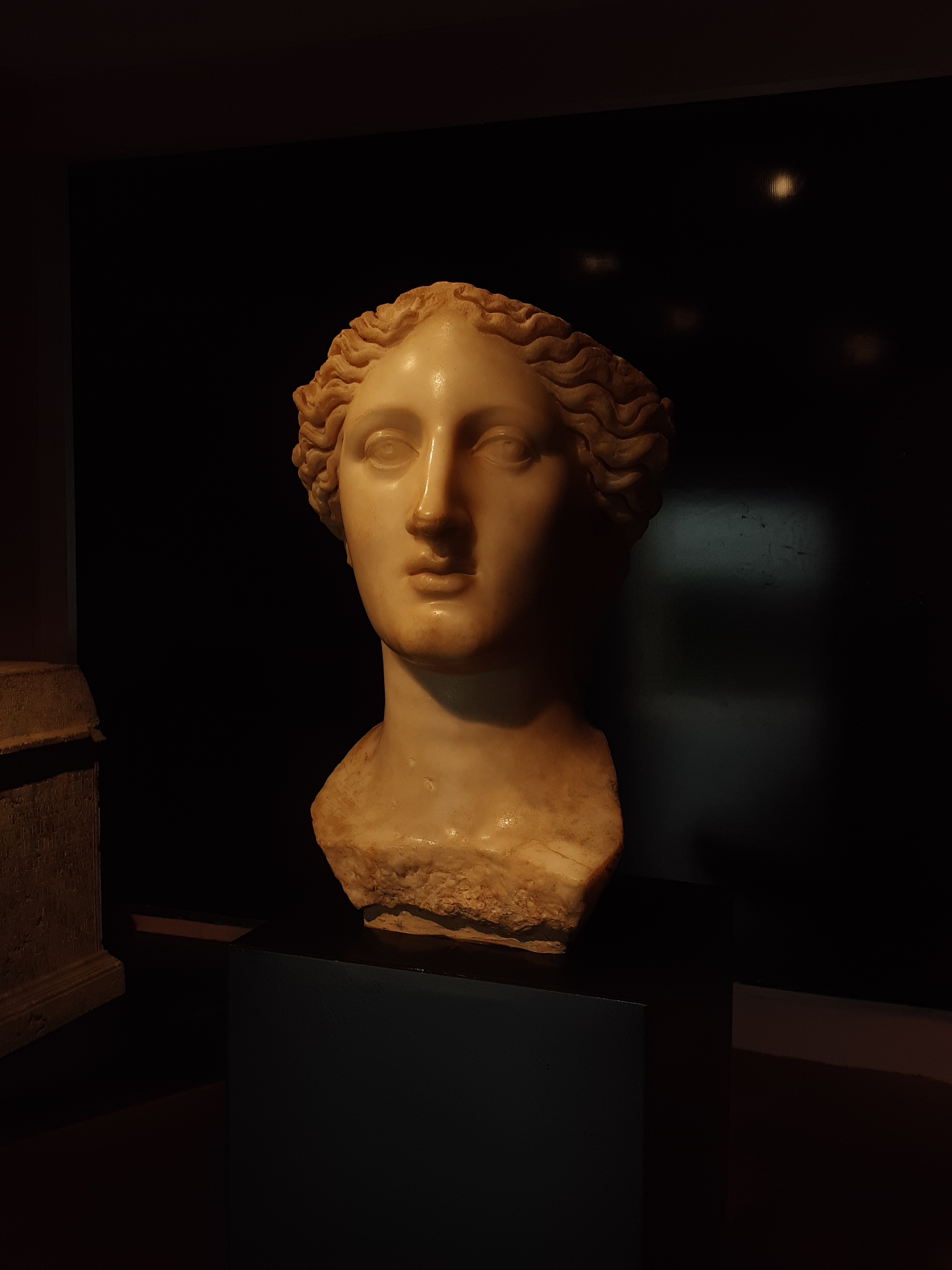
Marble sculpture of a female (possibly Venus), 25 BC-40 CE

White marble sculptures in display, originally found across Iulia Valentia Banasa, Tamoussida, and Chellah.

=== Hall of Bronzes ===
The oval showroom is entirely composed of bronzes excavated at Volubilis. Themes include Greco-Roman religion (figurines of Venus, Juno, Eros, etc.), busts of historical and political figures (famously Juba II, Cato), full-size statues (Ephebos), and public life (constitutions).

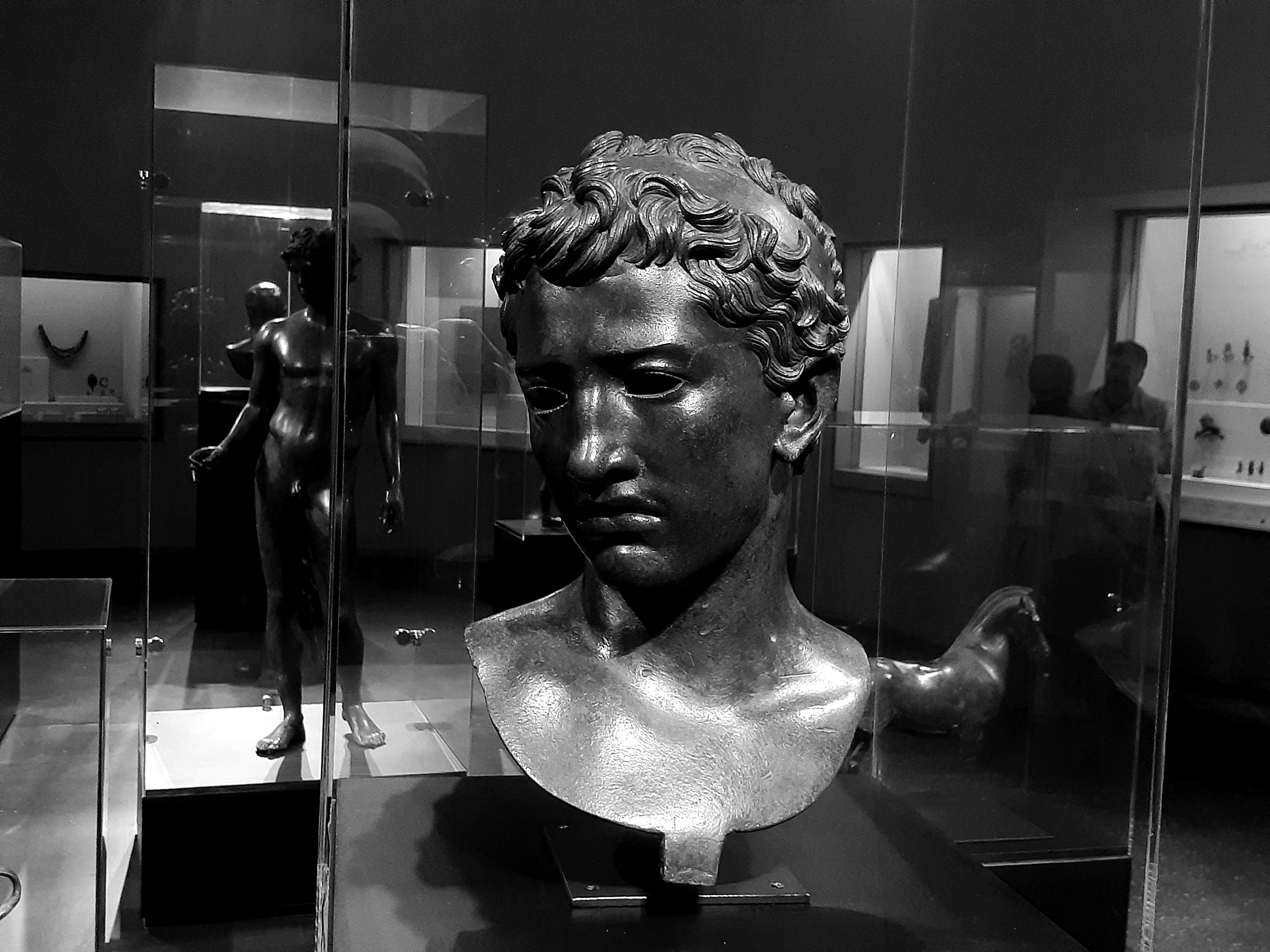
Bust of Juba II, 20 BCE

=== Islamic period ===
Presented in a dedicated pavilion, this section focuses on Islamic civilisation in Morocco, from the Almoravid dynasty to the Alaouites. Islamic coinage, Cuerda seca (dry cord), architectural elements, etc.

=== Rock Inscriptions ===
Displayed around a patio, this section includes Libyco-Berber inscriptions, the earliest written forms used by indigenous North Africans. Alongside them are Latin inscriptions and, additionally, Islamic inscriptions from Marrakesh.

== Gallery ==
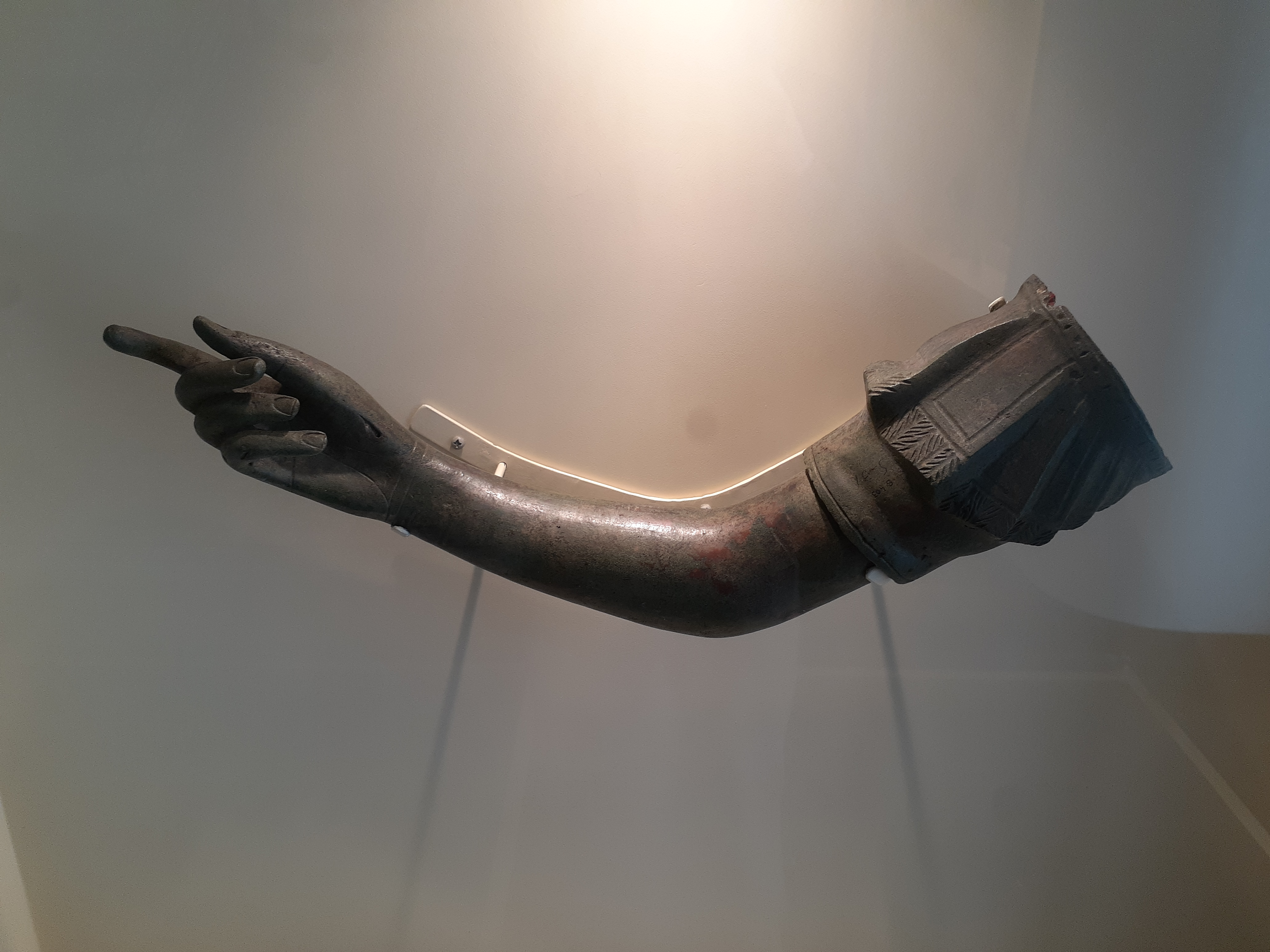
Bronze Arm

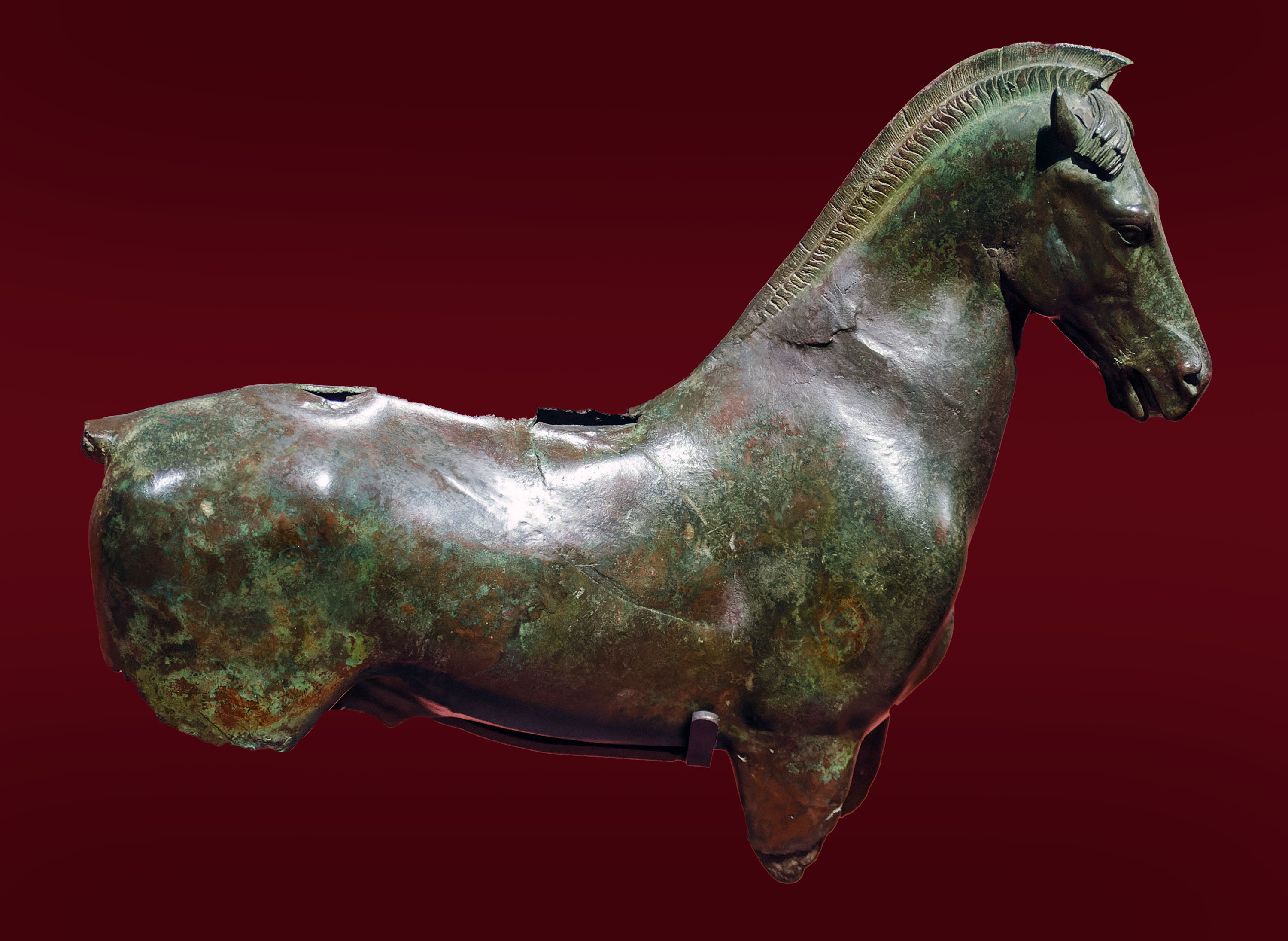
Bronze horse found in Volubilis

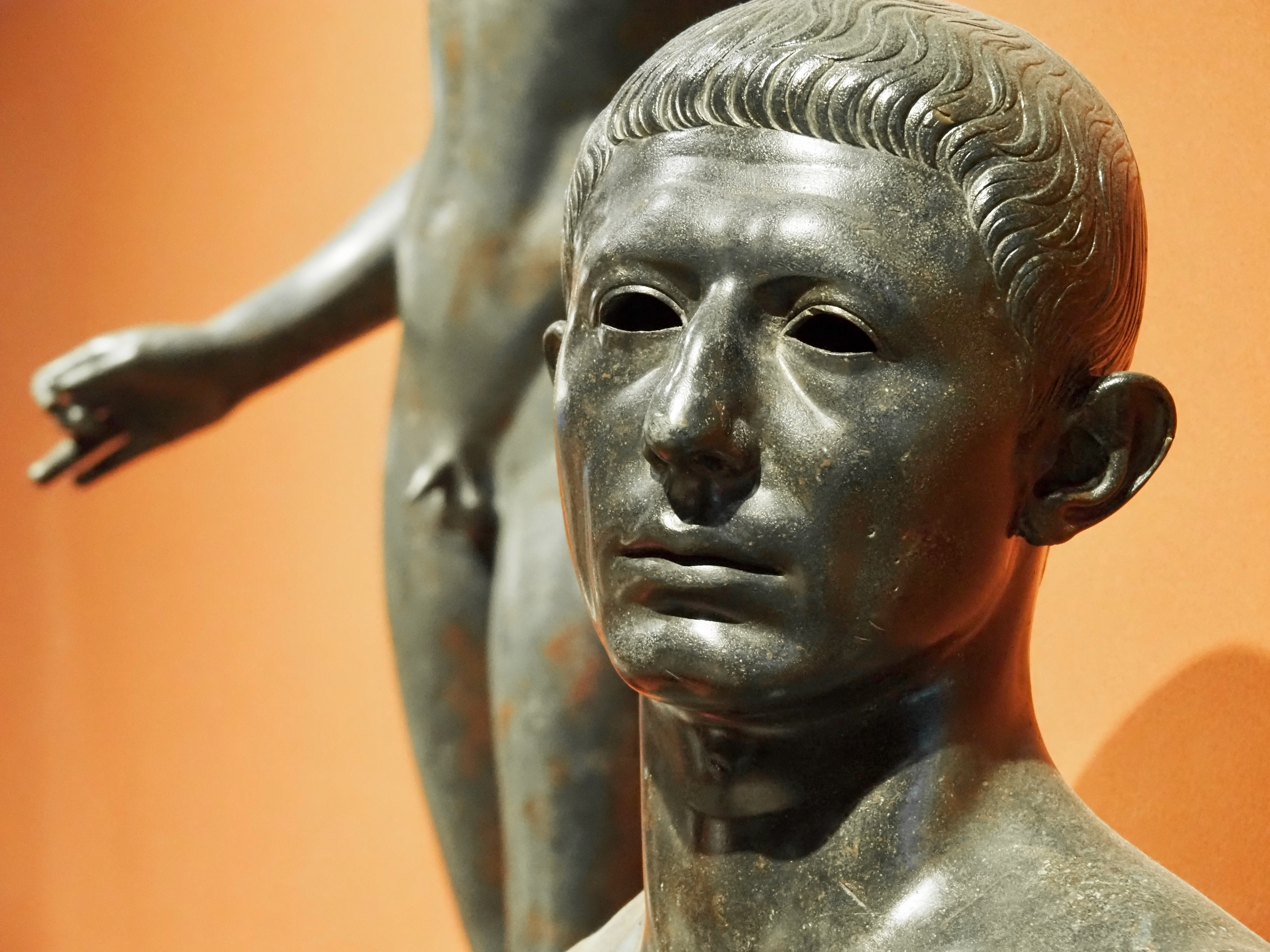
Cato the Younger

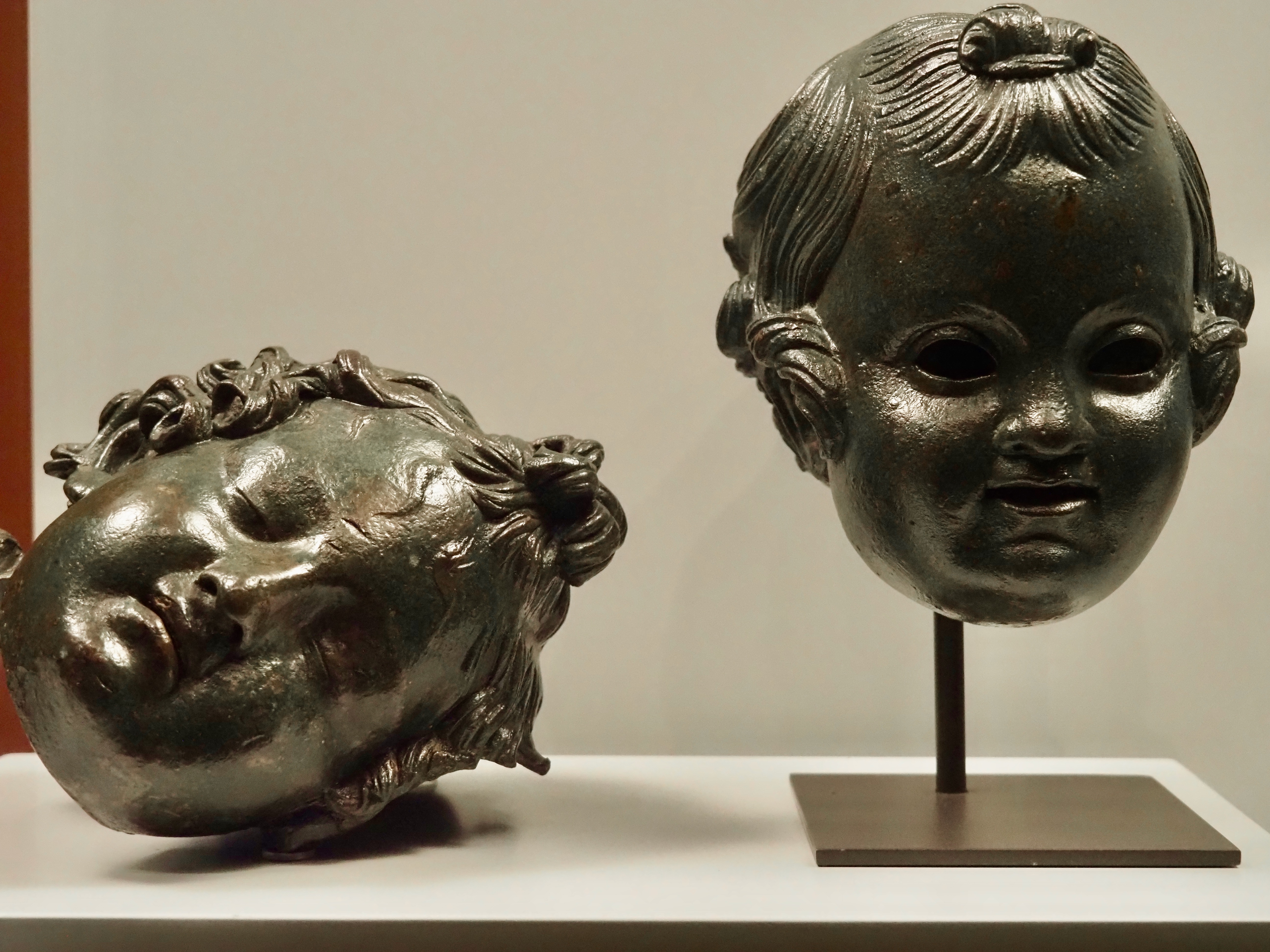
Eros // Cupid

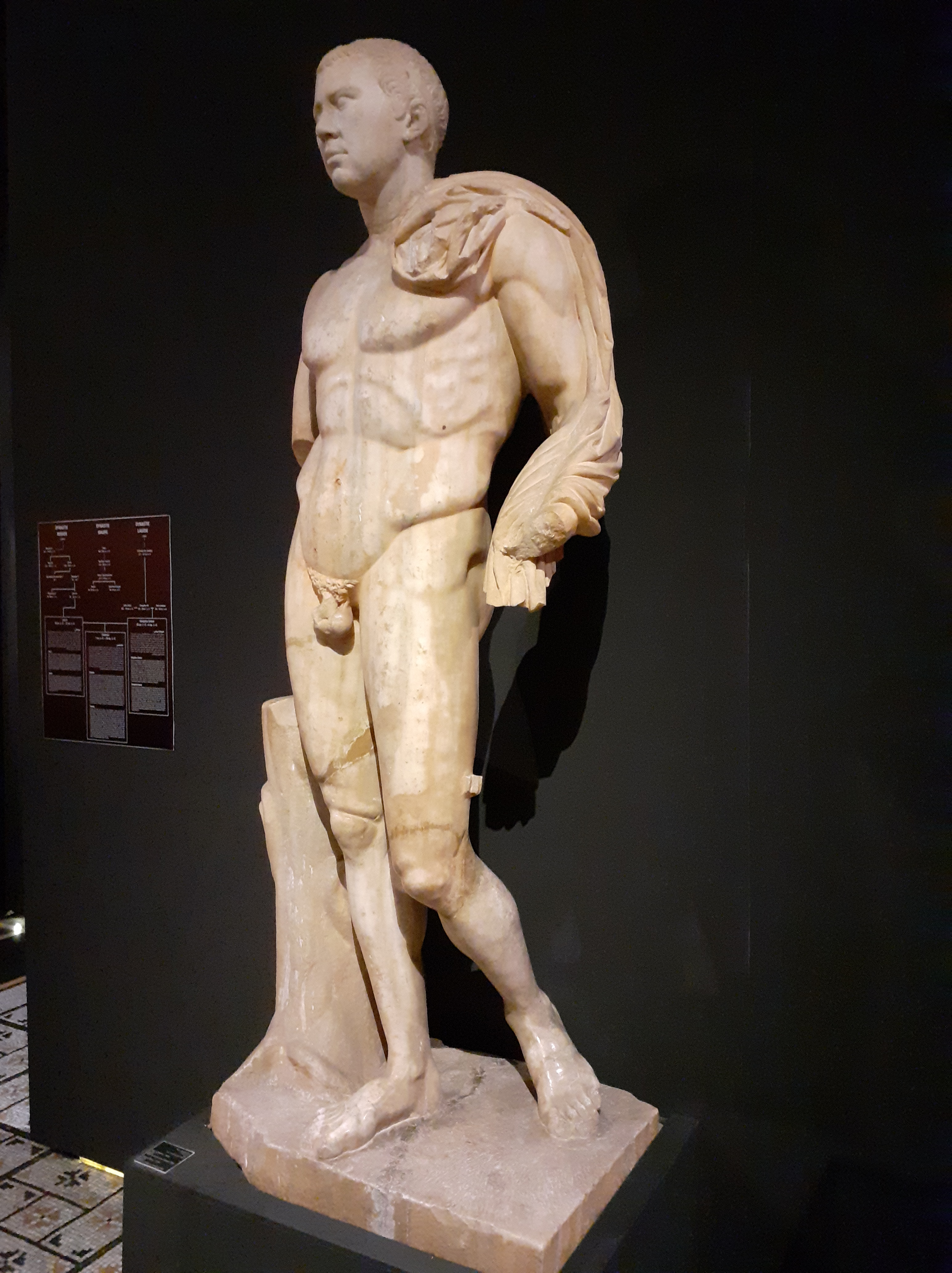
Ptolemy of Mauretania

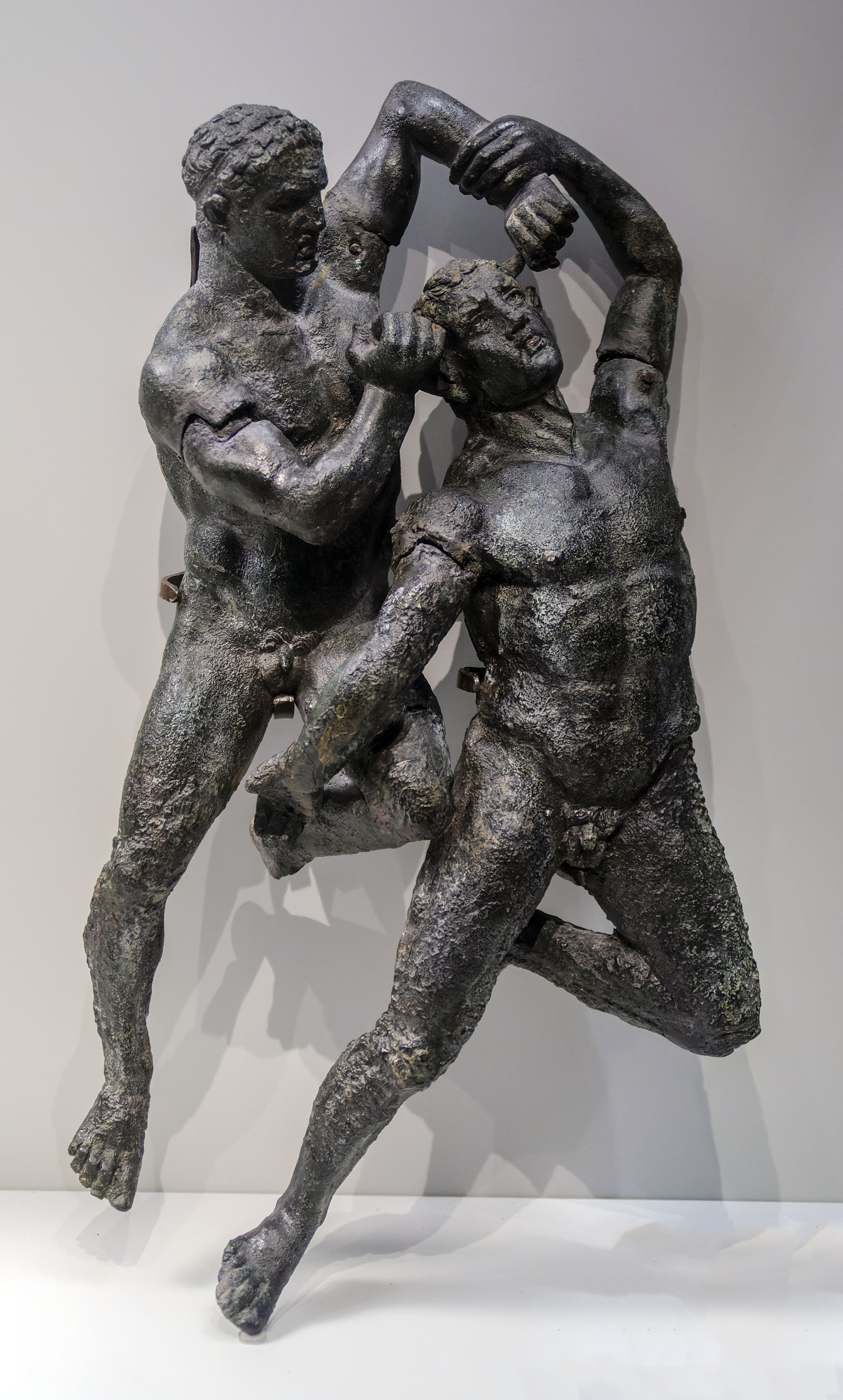
Theseus & the Minotaur.

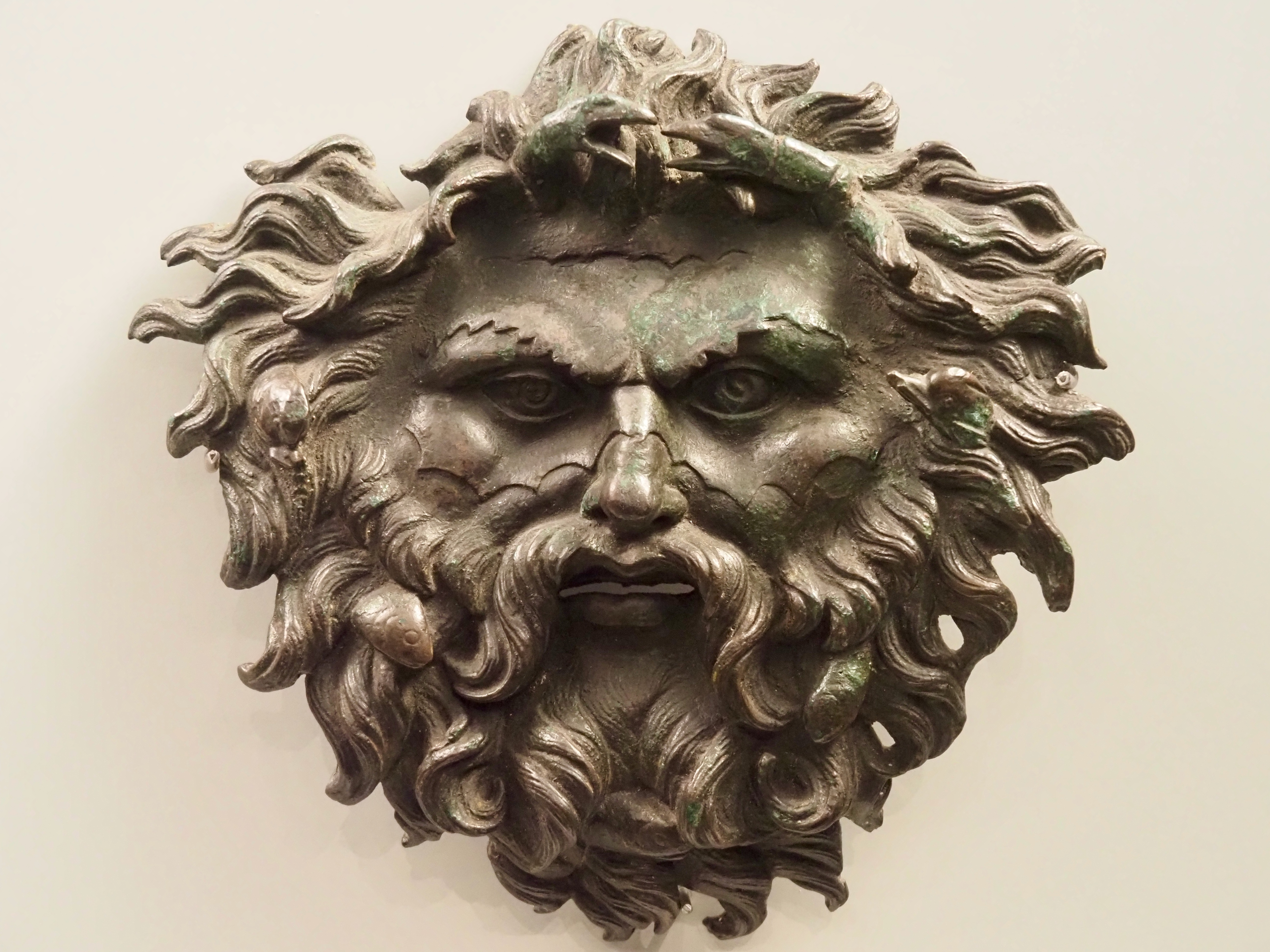
Neptune

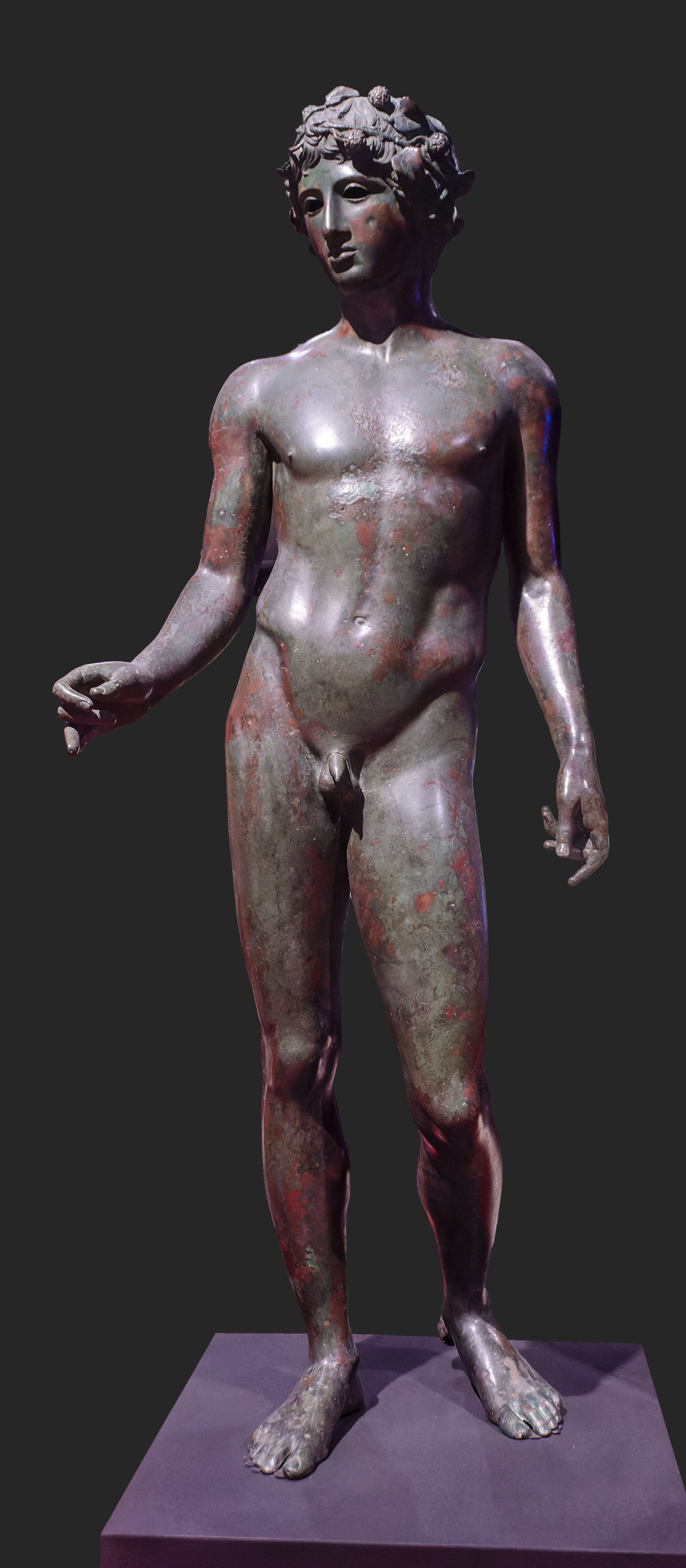
Ephebos

== See also ==
- Marrakech Museum
- Museum of Contemporary Art (Tangier)
- Joudia Hassar-Benslimane
