= Joudia Hassar-Benslimane =

Moroccan archaeologist (1943–2018)

Director of the National Institute of Archaeology and Heritage
- In office 1986–2005

Conservator of the Museum of History and Civilizations
- In office 1973–1986

Personal details
- Born: 1943
- Died: 22 May 2018 (aged 74–75)
- Spouse: Housni Benslimane
- Occupation: Archaeologist; Academic
- Known for: Islamic archaeology, founder and director of INSAP

Joudia Hassar-Benslimane (1943 (Note: her birth year is mentioned in multiple sources as 1943. Only on the commemorative plaque at the Archaeological Museum of Rabat is her birth year stated as 1953 (see photo)) – 22 May 2018) was a Moroccan historian and archeologist who specialized in Islamic archaeology, history and architecture. She was one of the first Moroccan female experts in archaeology, and made important contributions to advancing archeological research in Morocco, over her 30 years of career. She is generally considered as one of the most important figures in Moroccan archaeology.

== Biography ==
Joudia Hassar was born in 1943 to an old family of Salé, Morocco.

She married the Moroccan Gendarmerie officer and sports official Housni Benslimane.

== Career ==
Hassar-Benslimane joined the Moroccan Ministry of Culture in 1972, and was affiliated to the Archeological Museum of Rabat. Within a year, she became its director, as well as the director of the service of archeology within the ministry. She was involved in excavations focusing particularly on Islamic archaeology. Her first excavations were at the pre-urban site of Belyounech, near Ceuta. She then participated in the excavations at the first dynastic necropolis of the Merinids, at Tafertast, whose location she was the first to identify in Gharb region. She took part in excavations at Tinmal Mosque and elsewhere. Her book "Le passé de la ville de Salé dans tous ses états: histoire, archéologie, archives" ("Salé's past in all its states: history, archeology, archives"), became a reference in its area of expertise.

Hassar-Benslimane invested much effort in training the next generation of Moroccan archeologists, and in preserving the cultural heritage of the country. She was a professor of archeology and art history at Mohammed V University in Rabat, from 1978 to 1983; and was instrumental in founding the National Institute of Archaeology and Heritage (INSAP), and became its first director in 1986. The role of the institute includes the education and training of archeology students and research and excavation of sites in Morocco, in collaboration with the international community.

In 1986, she published an article on the archaeology of Sijilmassa, highlighting the importance of the site. In 1987, she received a doctorate in archaeology from Sorbonne Paris IV University. Her thesis about the city of Salé, under the supervision of Janine Sourdel-Thomine, was titled "Recherches sur la ville de Salé et problèmes d'archéologie marocaine" (research on the city of Salé and the problems of Moroccan archaeology).

In 1992, she founded the Société marocaine d’archéologie et du patrimoine (SMAP), an association officially presided by Princess Lalla Hasna of Morocco, and directed by Hassar-Benslimane as its president delegate until 2015. Among other initiatives, the association contributed to the excavation and preservation of the archaeological sites of Lixus and Kheddis. Additionally, through the association, she oversaw the publication of the archaeological journal Le Jardin des Hespérides from February 2004 until February 2015, when she retired.

According to Moroccan archeologist Abdeljalil Bouzouggar, current director of INSAP, Hassar helped emancipate Moroccan archaeology from colonialist hypotheses and interpretations which dominated during the French and Spanish protectorates, and led to the creation of a "Moroccan school of archeology". Furthermore, the number of archeological programs in Morocco went from 4 in 1975, to around 40 when she retired from her position as director of INSAP in 2005, overseeing the training of more than 200 young specialists in various areas of archeology up to that point.

== Death ==
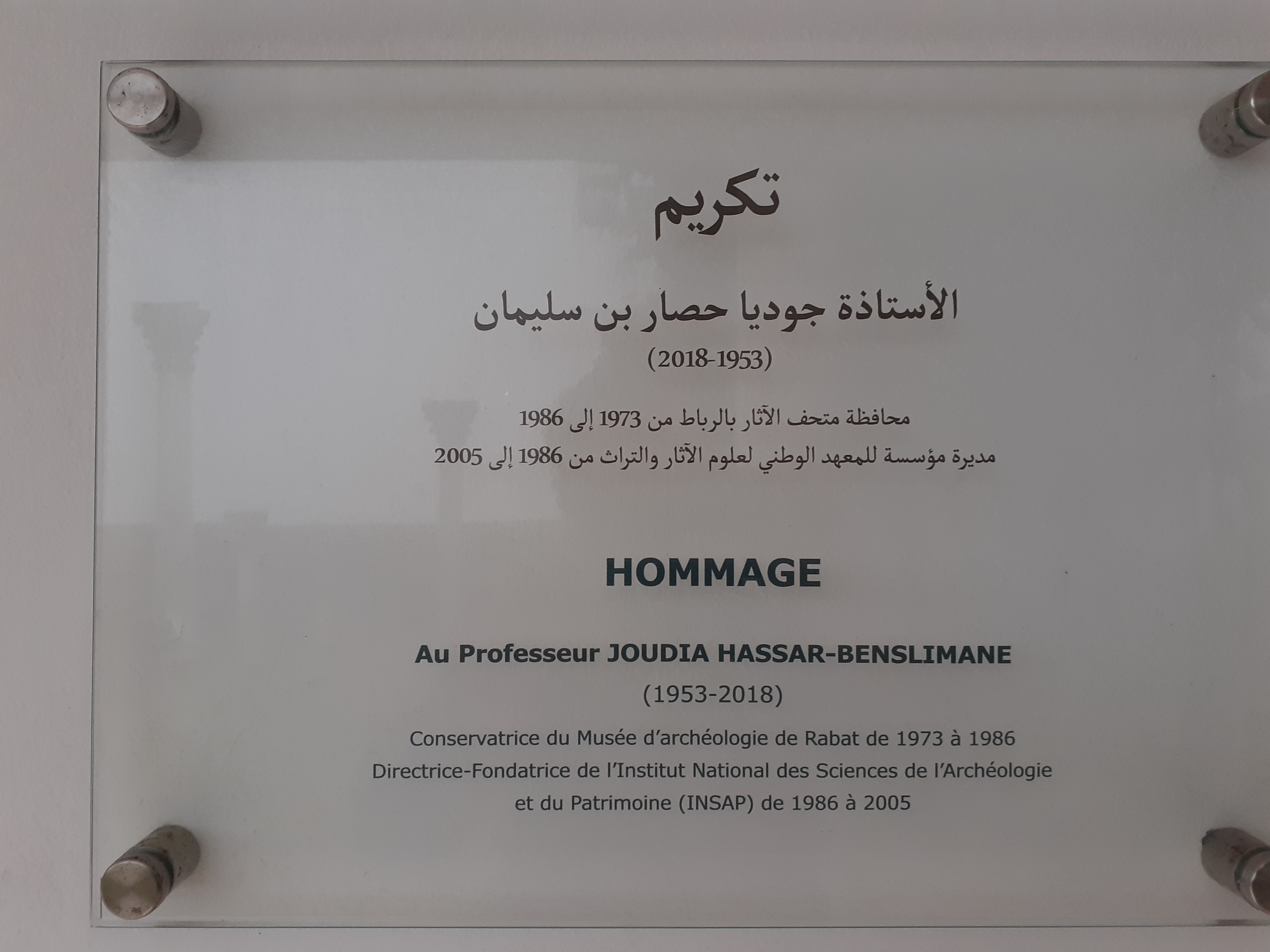
Commemorative plaque in honor of Joudia Hassar Benslimane at the Museum of History and Civilizations

Hassar-Benslimane died on Tuesday 22 May 2018, at 3 AM, after a long illness. She was buried in Hay Riad cemetery in Rabat. On 13 August 2018, the Moroccan Foundation for Museums unveiled a commemorative plaque in honor of Joudia Hassar at the Museum of History and Civilizations in Rabat, and named one of its halls after her.

== Publications ==
Some of Joudia Hassar-Benslimane's notable works include:

- Salé : étude architecturale de trois maisons traditionnelles, 1979
- Archives familiales et architecture privée à Salé, Bulletin Archéologique du Comité des Travaux Historiques et Scientifiques. Fascicule B, Afrique du Nord. 1984.
- Tinmel : l'épopée Almohade, 1992
- Le passé de la ville de Salé dans tous ses États. Histoire, archéologie, archives, Paris : Maisonneuve et Larose, 1992.
- L'archéologie islamique au Maroc et son apport à l'Histoire, Bulletins de l'Académie Royale de Belgique, 1993, pp. 457-468
- Maroc, terre de lumière. Morocco, land of light, Joudia Hassar-Benslimane, Philippe Ploquin, and Françoise Peuriot. 1999
- La recherche archéologique au Maroc durant deux décennies, Actes des 1ères Journées Nationales d’Archéologie et du Patrimoine. Volume 1 : Préhistoire : Rabat, 1-4 juillet 1998. 2001.

== See also ==
- Archaeological Museum of Rabat
- National Institute of Archaeology and Heritage
