= National Photography Museum (Morocco) =

- المتحف الوطني للفوتوغرافيا
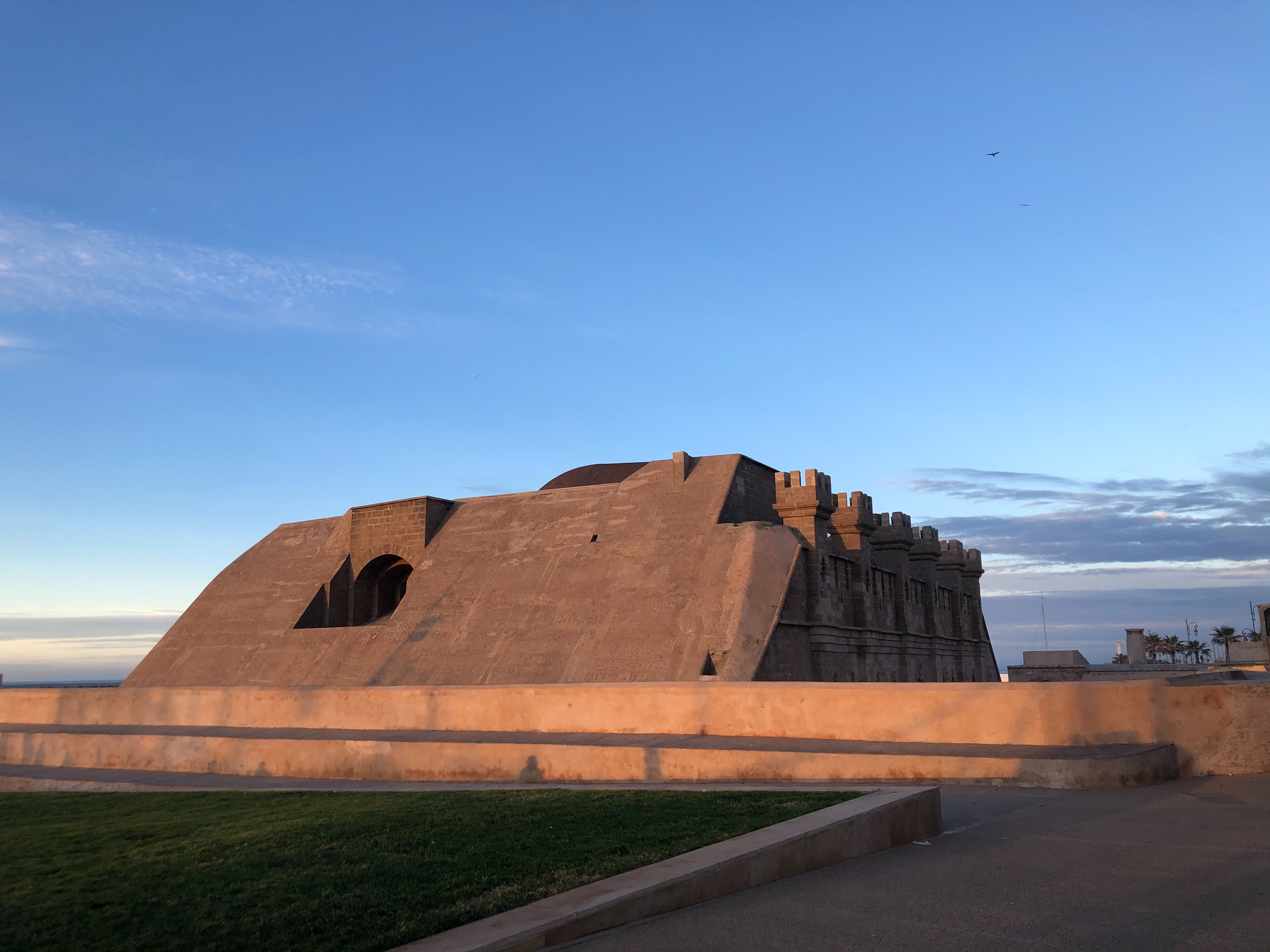
- The exterior of the former Burj Kebir Fortress repurposed to house the National Photography Museum.
- Established: 14 January 2020
- Location: Rabat, Morocco
- Coordinates: 34.025130°N 6.850930°W
- Type: photography museum

The National Photography Museum (Arabic: المتحف الوطني للفوتوغرافيا) is a Moroccan art museum dedicated to photography located in Rabat, Morocco, within the repurposed 19th-century Burj Kebir Fortress in the Ocean neighborhood. This museum was initiated by the National Foundation of Museums of Morocco (FNM) and inaugurated on January 14, 2020.

== Location ==
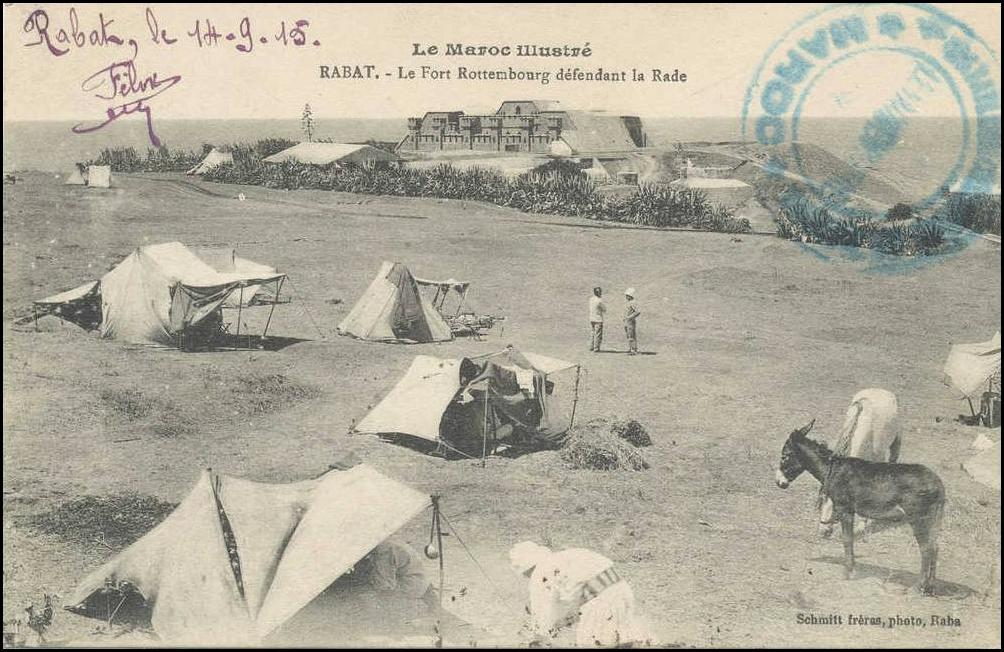
The Burj Kebir Fortress in 1915.

The National Photography Museum is located within the remains of the Burj Kebir Fortress, also known as Fort Rottembourg. The fort was constructed from 1888 to 1894 under the reign of Sultan Hassan I. Rottembourg refers to Walter Rottemburg, the German engineer who oversaw the fort's construction. The fort initially received a gift of 20 cannons from Hamburg, of which two still exist on site.

== Opening ==
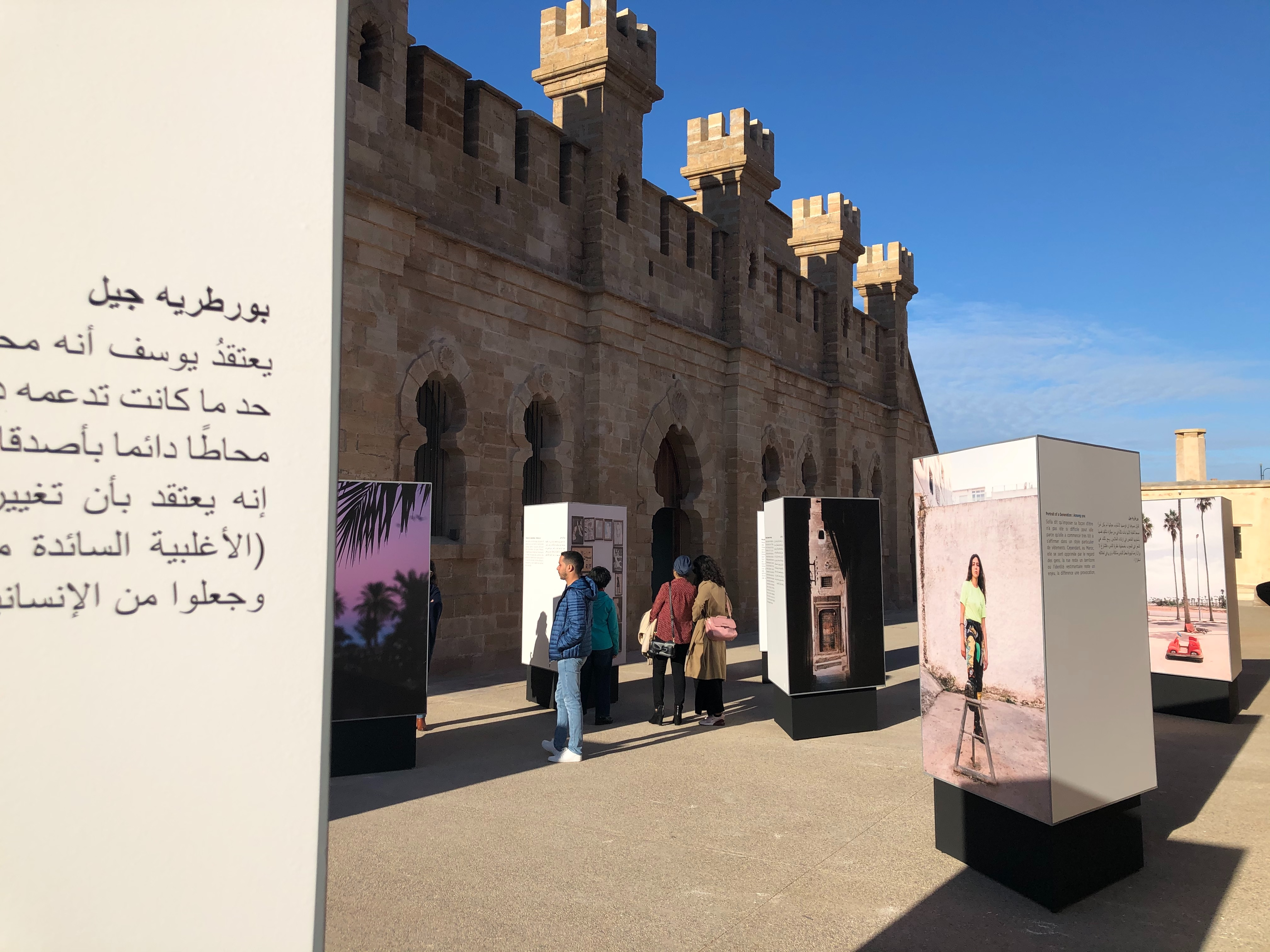
Visitors observe the works by the Moroccan photographer M’hammed Kilito Portrait of a Generation, on display in the open air in front of the Burj Kebir Fortress.

The National Photography Museum was inaugurated January 14, 2020. Mehdi Qutbi, president of the National Museums Foundation of Morocco, which created the museum, said in a statement to the press: "In this space, Fort Rottembourg, situated next to a low-income neighborhood, we attempt to deliver a message that says that culture must be accessible to every Moroccan."

He also said that the museum's inauguration corresponded with the directives of King Muhammad VI, regarding the democratization of culture.

== Exhibitions ==
The Moroccan photographer Yoriyas organized the museum's inaugural exhibition. Sourtna (صورتنا, our image) presented some of Morocco's photographers "of today and of tomorrow." In a statement to the press, Yoriyas said: "I'm convinced that visual development plays a part in the socio-economic development of a country. For me, this here means that Morocco is capable of representing itself in images, that we are capable of producing images, of defending them, of sharing them, of showing them and of seeing them."

This exhibition featured works by Zakaria Ait Wakrim, Abderrahman Amazzal, Hamza Ben Rachad, Walid Bendra, Déborah Benzaquen, Lhoucine Boubelrhiti, Mourad Fedouache, M'hammed Kilito, Ismail Zaidy (L4artiste), Mehdy Mariouch, Amine Oulmakki, Ali ElMadani (Rwinalife), Fatimazohra Serri, Style Beldi, Yassine Toumi, and Yoriyas.

The next exhibition was titled A bonne distance(s) (From good distance(s)), documenting the COVID-19 pandemic from New York to Moulay Bousselham, and Rio de Janeiro to Gaza. These images had been taken by Agence France Presse photoreporters.

In August 2021, the museum hosted the exhibition “Views on the young Moroccan photographic scene”. The photographs on display were acquired following the call for competition launched in June 2020 by the FNM, in partnership with the Ministry of Culture, Youth and Sports.

In March 2022, an exhibition with works by 24 women photographers opened at the National Museum of Photography, showing different artistic and thematic approaches, ranging from inquiries on the body to multiple sociological and anthropological themes. Featured artists included Amina Benbouchta, Lalla Essaydi, Lamia Naji, Yasmina Bouziane, Deborah Benzaqen, Yasmina Alaoui, Rita Alaoui, Safae Mazirh, Aassmaa Akhannouch, Hasnae El Ouarga, Yasmine Hatimi, Imane Djamil, Btihal Remli, Madiha Sebbani, Khadija El Abyad, Fatimazohra Serri, Ines Bouallou, Soumaya Azahaf, Salima Hamrini, Hind Moumou, Nawar Nasseh, Fatima Zohra Lahouitar and Jalila Moustakbal.

== See also ==
- House of Photography of Marrakech
- Category:Moroccan photographers
