= Lhiba Kingzoo =

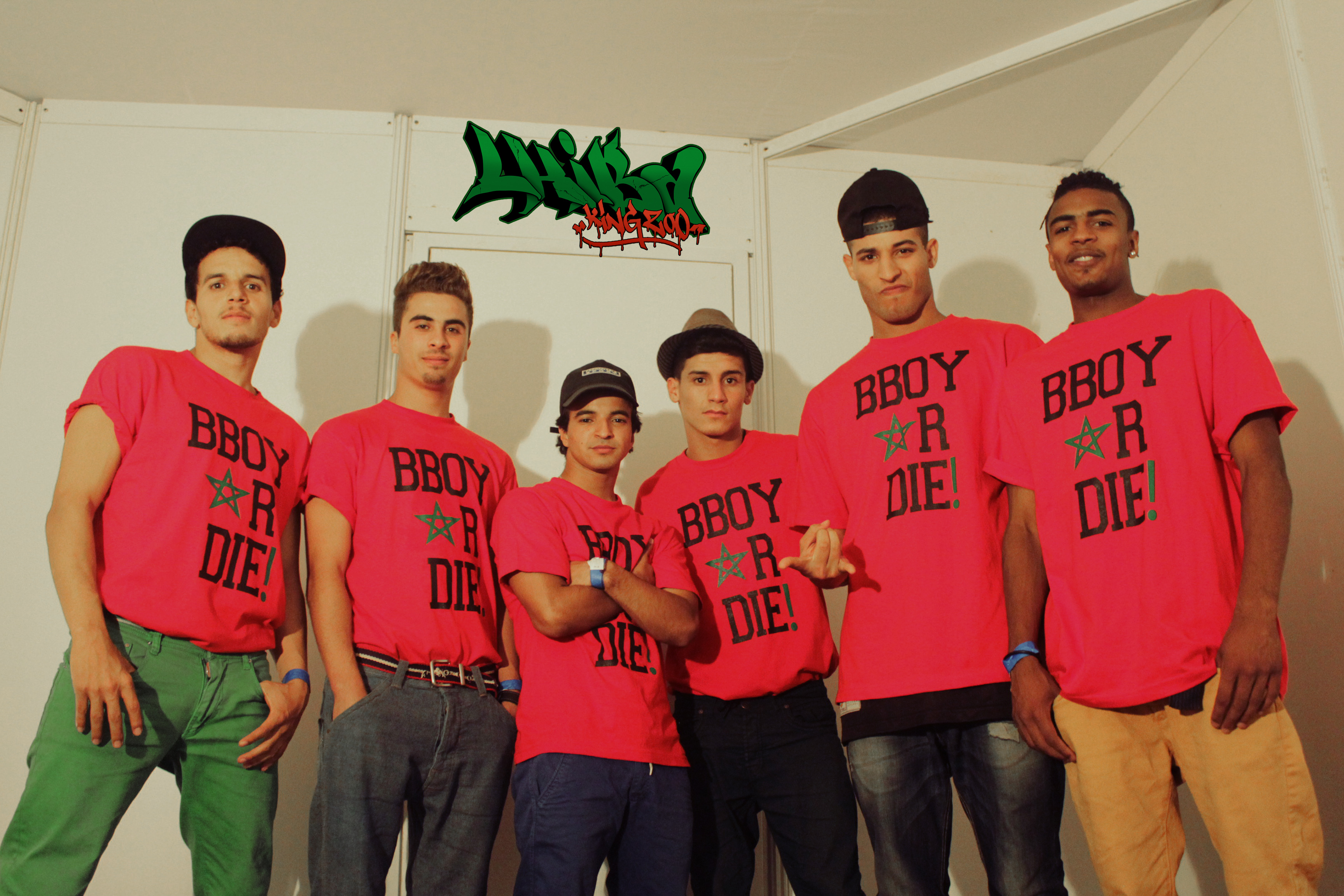
The crew of Lhiba Kingzoo.

Lhiba Kingzoo is a break dance crew formed in Casablanca in 2005. Its founder and current leader is Yassine Alaoui Ismaili, also known as Yoriyas.

== Biography ==
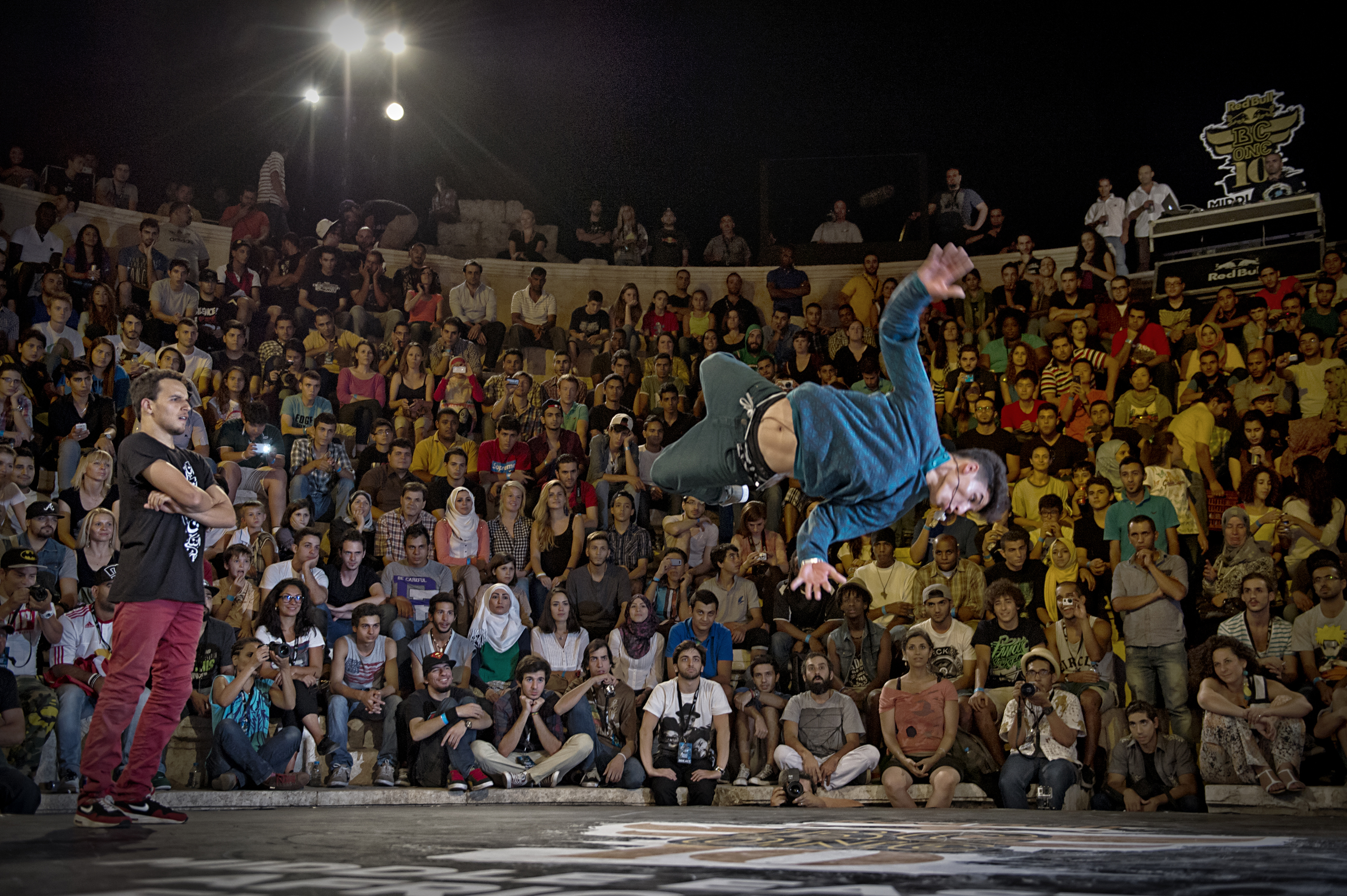
Semifinal of Red Bull Bc One Africa Middle East 2013: Yoriyas vs. Lilzoo, both members of Lhiba Kingzoo

Lhiba Kingzoo was established in Casablanca in 2005. In short time, it achieved major success in Morocco as well as in Africa.

In 2010, the crew was world runner up in Denmark. On September 4, 2011, for the first time, an African dance crew won an international crew battle in Europe—the International Funky Afternoon vol 2 held in Rome.

From 2005 to 2014, the crew participated in numerous international events such as:

- Battle of the Year in France
- Floor Wars in Denmark
- Fever Seoul in South Korea
- North Sea Jam in the Netherlands
- Break Cologne in Germany
- Redbull BC One
- Break To Be Free in Tunisia
- Underground Base in Turkey

Thanks to its success, the crew became a common fixture at Redbull BC One, one of the biggest break dance events. The crew has collaborated with artist of international fame such as Jay Park, Busta Rhymes, and Jennifer Lopez.

The group was invited to perform for the Prince Hassan of Morocco at the royal palace in Skhirat. The group was also invited to represent Morocco in the Jeux de la Francophonie held in Nice, France in 2013.

In September of the same year, two member of the crew—Yoriyas and Lil Zoo—found themselves competing against each other in the semifinal of Redbull BC One Africa Middle East held in Jordan. Yoriyas was unable to finish the competition due to a recent injury on his left leg. Lilzoo thus met B-Boy Benny (South Africa) in the final, and Lilzoo ultimately won the competition for the second consecutive year.

== Crew ==
- Yoriyas (Yassine Alaoui Ismaili) Founder, leader and manager of the group.
- Lilzoo (Fouad Ambelj) - 12th place ranked globally
- Khaire (Khaireddine Safwane)
- Zolax (Abdrazzake Barina)
- Mickye (Mouad Aissi)
- Cri6 (Youness El Mouaffaq) - 40th place ranked globally
- Wolf
- Hatouta

== Fever Seoul Top 6 ==
Fever Seoul Top 6 are the best B-boys in the world as selected by Jay Park to compete against the best South Korean crew and to shoot a video in Seoul. The competition was organized by the city of Seoul.

- 6 Aranha Brazil (Tsunami All Stars crew)
- 5 Drama Italy
- 4 Redo Netherlands
- 3 Victor Kim United States (Quest Crew: American best dance crew )
- 2 Yoriyas Morocco (Lhiba Kingzoo crew)
- 1 Atomic Goofball United States (Lionz of Zion crew)+

== In Italy ==
INTERNATIONAL FUNKY AFTERNOON Vol.2
	Crew	Versus	Crew
Round of 32	Lhiba kingzoo Morocco	VS	Urban Force Italy
Round of 16	Abstract Crew Italy	VS	Lhiba kingzoo Morocco
Quarter Finals	Lhiba kingzoo Morocco	VS	Upper Underground Tunisia
Semifinals	Lhiba kingzoo Morocco	VS	Last Alive Italy
Final	Warsaw Flava Poland	VS	Lhiba kingzoo Morocco
Champion: "Lhiba kingzoo"

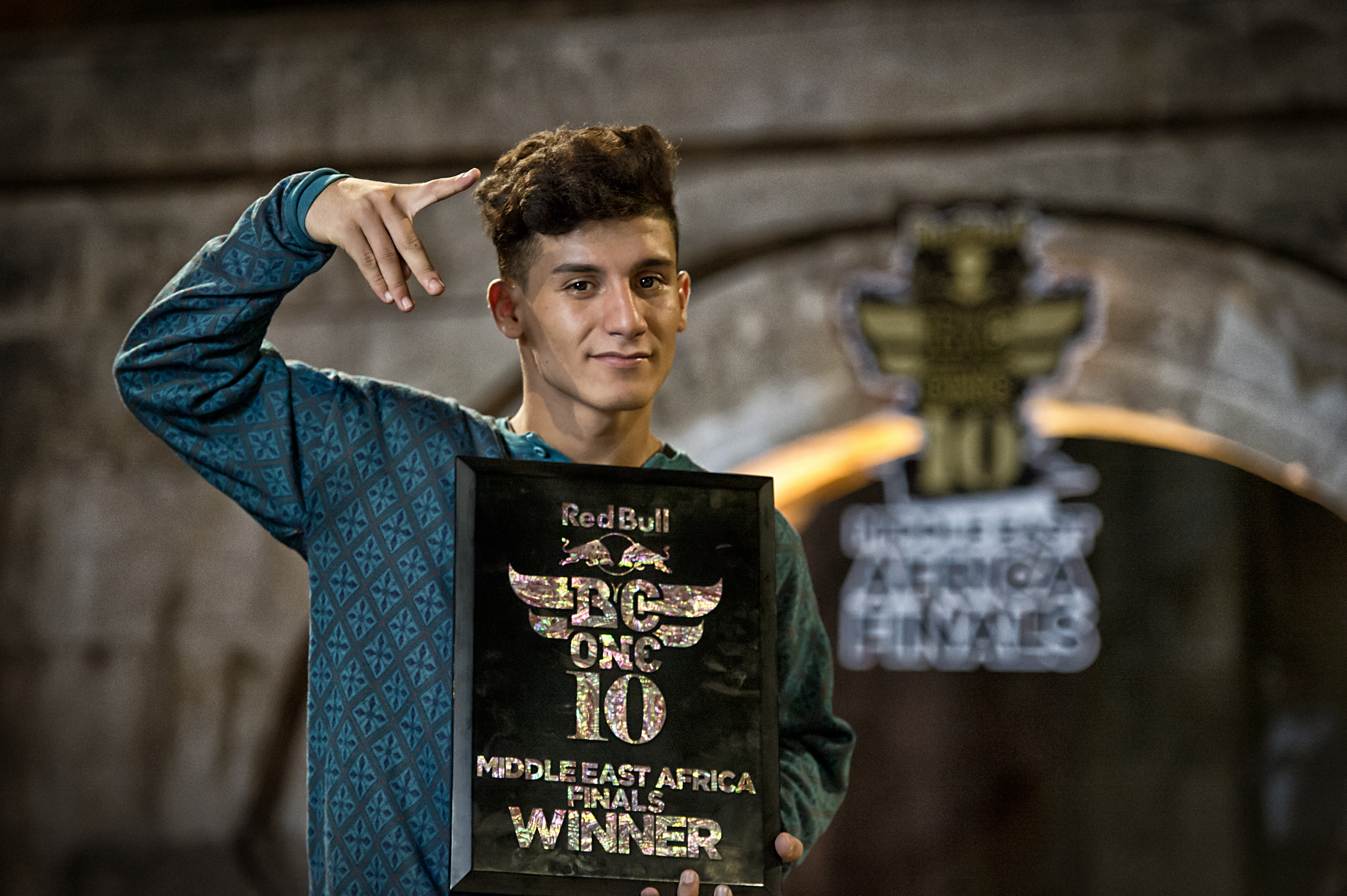
Red Bull BC One Africa Middle East 2013 champion Lil Zoo
