= Housni Benslimane =

Moroccan general

Housni Benslimane حسني بن سليمان
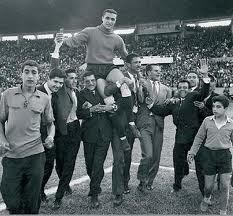
- Benslimane as AS FAR goalkeeper carried by his teammates after the Moroccan Throne Cup final

Commander of the Royal Moroccan Gendarmerie
- In office 1970s – 4 December 2017
- Preceded by: Bouazza Boulhimez
- Succeeded by: Mohamed Harmou

President of the Moroccan Olympic Committee
- In office 1994–2017
- Preceded by: Hassan Sefrioui
- Succeeded by: Faïçal Laraïchi

President of the Royal Moroccan Football Federation
- In office 1995 – 16 April 2009
- Preceded by: Houssaine Zemmouri
- Succeeded by: Ali Fassi Fihri

Director of the Moroccan General Directorate for National Security
- In office 1967–1972
- Preceded by: Mohamed Oufkir
- Succeeded by: Ahmed Dlimi

Personal details
- Born: 14 December 1935 (age 90) El Jadida, Morocco
- Spouse: Joudia Hassar-Benslimane
- Occupation: Army officer Football/sports administrator Footballer

Military service
- Allegiance: Morocco
- Branch/service: Royal Moroccan Armed Forces
- Years of service: 1947–2018
- Rank: General
- Unit: Royal Moroccan Gendarmerie
- Battles/wars: Western Sahara War
Association football career
- Position: Goalkeeper
Senior career*
Years	Team	Apps	(Gls)
1958–1961	AS FAR		
- * Club domestic league appearances and goals

General Housni Benslimane (Arabic: حسني بن سليمان; born 14 December 1935, El Jadida) is a senior Moroccan Gendarmerie officer who has served as the Commander-in-Chief of this unit. He also presides over the Moroccan Olympic Committee and was president of the Moroccan FA between 1994 and 2009.

Housni Benslimane played football for Moroccan club AS FAR serving as goalkeeper between 1958 and 1961.

== Family ==
Housni Benslimane is also the nephew of Abdelkrim al-Khatib, uncle of Ismail Alaoui, the former president of the Party of Progress and Socialism. His wife is Moroccan archaeologist Joudia Hassar-Benslimane. His eldest son Mohamed Benslimane is married to Zineb Alaoui, daughter of Prince Moulay Abdallah and sister of Moulay Hicham Alaoui.

== See also ==
- Abdelaziz Bennani
