= National Institute of Archaeology and Heritage =

Organization in Rabat, Morocco

Coordinates: 33.9774°N 6.8718°W

- Institut National des Sciences de l'Archéologie et du Patrimoine
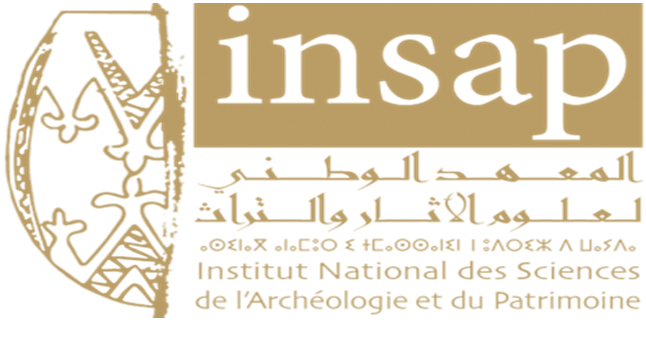
- Logo of the National Institute of Archaeology and Heritage
- Type: Public higher education and research institute
- Established: 31 January 1985
- Parent institution: Ministry of Youth, Culture and Communication
- Director: Abdeljalil Bouzouggar
- Location: Rabat, Morocco
- Website: insap.ac.ma

The National Institute of Archaeology and Heritage (French: Institut National des Sciences de l'Archéologie et du Patrimoine; INSAP; Arabic: المعهد الوطني لعلوم الآثار والتراث) is an institute affiliated with the Moroccan Ministry of Youth, Culture and Communication. It specializes in research and the training of professionals in the fields of archaeology and cultural heritage.

Although the institute is a higher education institution, it is not part of the Moroccan university system according to the decree reorganizing the institution, published in issue no. 5994 of the Official Bulletin of the Kingdom of Morocco on 10 November 2011.

== History ==
The institute was founded in 1985, in part through the efforts of Moroccan archaeologist and conservator Joudia Hassar-Benslimane, who became its first director.

It is currently headed by Moroccan archaeologist Abdeljalil Bouzouggar (since July 2022).

== Administration ==
The institute is headed by a Director General appointed by the government authority responsible for culture. The Director General is assisted by two directors proposed to the governmental department in charge of culture. One is responsible for academic affairs and research, while the other oversees training and internships. The institute also has a Secretary-General and an Institute Council composed of elected faculty members, administrative and technical staff, students, and personalities from outside the institute.

== Activities ==
The National Institute of Archaeology and Heritage is entrusted with a number of functions, primarily the provision of training in the fields of archaeology, anthropology, heritage studies, and related disciplines. The institute also organizes conferences, seminars, and studies within its areas of specialization, and awards diplomas and certificates to successful students.

== Academic programs and departments ==
Studies at the institute are organized into four academic cycles: the Fundamental Cycle Diploma, the Master's, the Specialized Master's, and the Doctorate.

The institute's academic departments include Prehistoric Archaeology, Pre-Islamic Archaeology, Islamic Archaeology, anthropology and museum studies, as well as Historic Monuments, Archaeological Sites, and Archaeometric Dating.

== Directors ==
- Joudia Hassar-Benslimane (1986-2005)
- Aomar Akerraz (November 2005 - May 2008 by interim, then director from May 2008 to 2018)
- Abdelouahed Bennacer (2018-2022)
- Abdeljalil Bouzouggar (2022-)
