= Cri6 =

Moroccan breakdancer (born 1994)

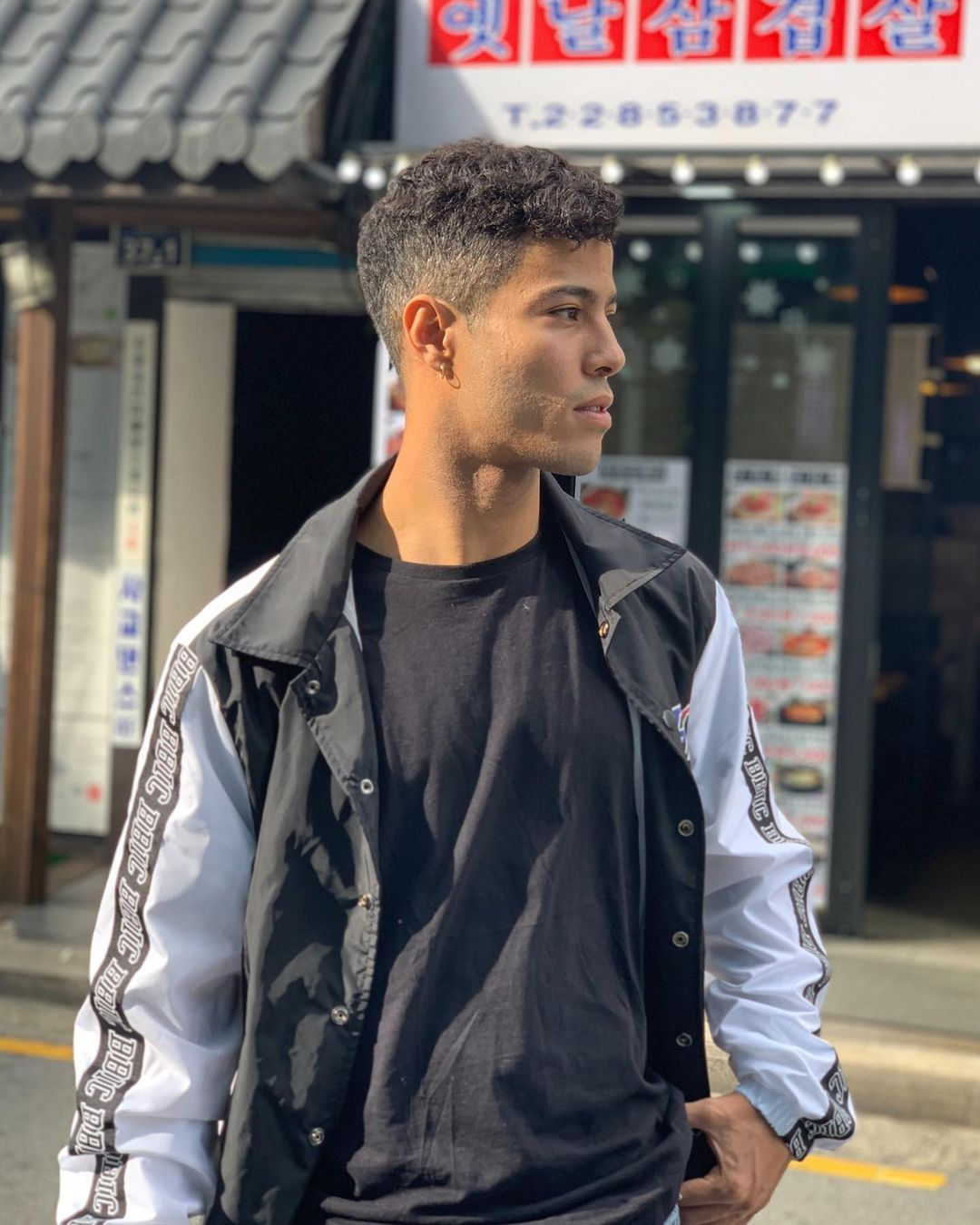
- Cri6 in Seoul, South Korea (2019)

Personal information
- Full name: Youness El Mouaffaq
- Nickname: Bboy Cri6
- Nationality: Moroccan
- Born: 1994 (age 31–32) Fez, Morocco
- Years active: 2006 ~ Present

Sport
- Country: Morocco
- Sport: Dancesport
- Event: Breakdancing
Medal record
Hip-hop dance
Representing Morocco
Jeux de la Francophonie
Silver medal – second place	2017 Abidjan	Hip-hop dance

Youness El Mouaffaq (born 1994), better known by his stage name Cri6, is a London-based Moroccan competitive b-boy. As of July 2017, he has won a silver medal in the Hip-hop dance category at the VIII Jeux de la Francophonie in Abidjan, Ivory Coast, competing together with the Moroccan national team 04 Lkarwa.

== Career ==
Youness El Mouaffaq was born in Fez, Morocco. He performed in some of the international dance competitions included Red Bull BC One World Final, World BBoy Series, The Notorious IBE, BBIC Korea, B.I.S China.

Youness El Mouaffaq, competing as Bboy Cri6, has been rising as a top competitor on the scene for the past few years. He's a member of El Mouwahidine and Lhiba Kingzoo with fellow Moroccan B-Boys, Lil Zoo and The Wolfer.

At the 2017 Jeux de la Francophonie in Abidjan, Ivory Coast, the Canal aux Bois stage hosted the final phase of Hip-hop dance competition. Youness El Mouaffaq won the silver medal in the Hip-hop dance category, competing together with the Moroccan national team 04 Lkarwa and succeeded in hoisting the flag of Morocco in the skies of Abidjan and thus offering the country a silver medal at the VIII Jeux de la Francophonie.

Youness El Mouaffaq ranked 18th place globally at WDSF World Breaking Championship that took a place in Nanjing, China on June 23, 2019.

He also participated in numerous international events such as:

- 30.11.2019 Hustle & Freeze Vol.14 China
- 23.06.2019 WDSF World Breaking Championship China
- 15.03.2019 Circle Industry Austria
- 13.10.2018 DPC Jam Switzerland
- 27.09.2018 Red Bull BC One World Final Switzerland
- 21.04.2018 JBL Unbreakable World Final Belgium
- 17.12.2016 Risk Battle 2017 Austria
- 22.10.2016 D.Point.C Jam Switzerland.

== Awards ==
- 1st Place The Notorious IBE 3 vs 3, Netherlands – 2019
- 1st Circle Industry Finals, Austria – 2019
- 1st Place Best Moroccan B-boy – 2019
- 1st Place Battle of East, Estonia – 2018
- 2nd Place DPC JAM, Switzerland – 2018
- 2nd Place Les Jeux de la Francophonie, Ivory Coast – 2017
- 1st Place Show and Prove, UK – 2016
- 2nd Place Pasha 2312 All styles, Austria – 2016
- 1st Place Red Bull BC One, Morocco Cypher – 2015
