= The Notorious IBE =

Dutch hip-hop and urban dance festival

The Notorious IBE is an international hip hop dance festival in Heerlen, The Netherlands. Between 1998 and 2005 the festival took place at Nighttown in Rotterdam, the Netherlands. In 2008 the festival moved to the city of Heerlen in the southern province of Limburg (Netherlands).
