= Yoriyas =

Moroccan street photographer and breakdancer

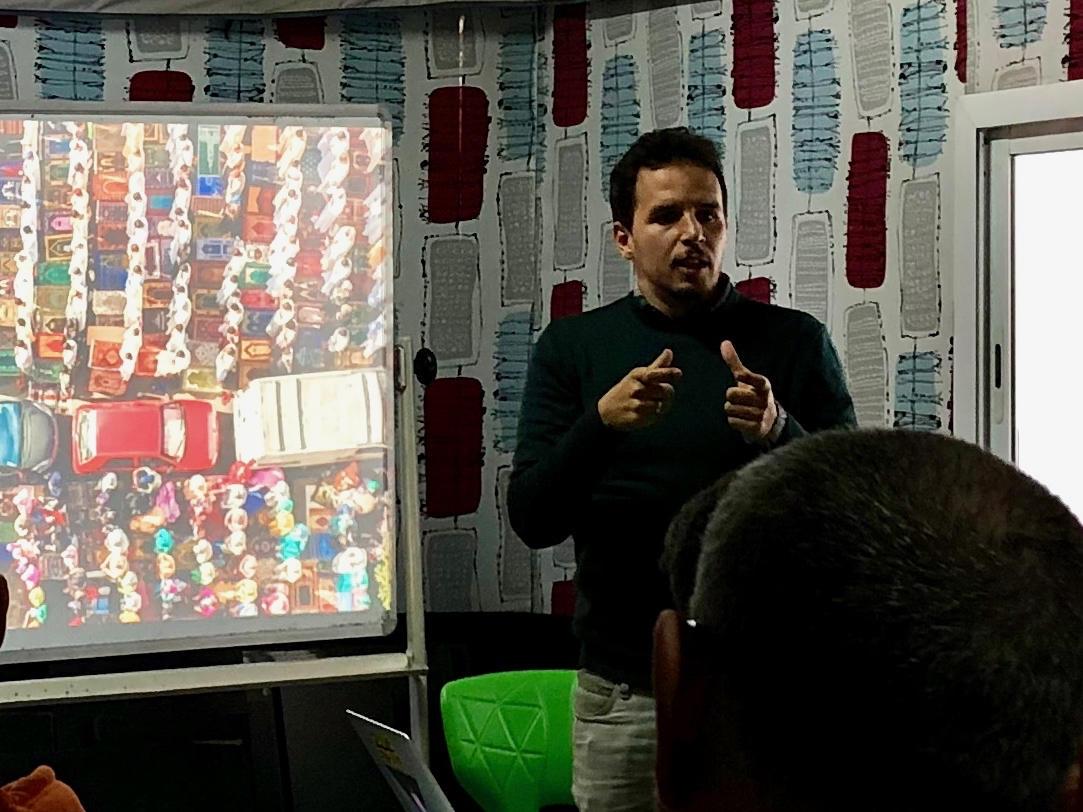
- Yoriyas presenting at the American Language Center in Casablanca in 2019.
- Born: Yassine Alaoui Ismaili; 1984
- Awards: Prize of Arab World Institute for Contemporary Arab Creation; 2019 First prize in World Street Photography, Hamburg; 2016

Yassine Alaoui Ismaili (ياسين العلوي الإسماعيلي), known as Yoriyas, is a Moroccan street photographer and breakdancer based in Casablanca, Morocco.

== Photography projects ==
He started with photography in 2007, when his dance crew, Lhiba Kingzoo, was invited to perform in Salzburg, Austria. He bought a simple camera from a flea market to share photos of the trip with family.

From the Street to the Olympics chronicles breakdancing in Senegal, Morocco, Algeria, France, the Netherlands, and Germany.

Casablanca Not The Movie presents images of life in Casablanca, Morocco. These images counter Orientalist images of the city based on the 1942 American film Casablanca.

In 2020, Yoriyas organized Sourtna (صورتنا our image), the inaugural exhibition at the Moroccan National Photography Museum in Rabat.
