= International B-Boy Championships =

International breakdancing competition

B-boying or Breaking, also called Breakdancing, is a style of street dance that originated among African-American and Puerto Rican youths in New York City during the early 1970s. The dance spread worldwide due to popularity in the media, especially in regions such as South Korea, United Kingdom, Germany, France, Russia, and Japan. Now, b-boying has gained much popularity around the world with countless competitions crowning the best bboy crews and solo bboys. Many consider Battle of the Year, The Notorious IBE, UK B-Boy Championships and R-16 Korea to be the 4 major international bboy competitions which determine the best bboy crew in the world. Along with crew battles, solo, or 1 on 1 battles, have also gained much popularity around the world. UK B-Boy Championships, Battle of the Year and R-16 Korea are also well known for their 1 on 1 b-boy championships. However, Red Bull BC One is argued to be the most coveted competition to crown the best solo b-boy due to their audience and popularity worldwide.

== International Solo B-boy Champions list ==
In 2014 the most renowned international solo Breaking competitions joined together in the creation of the Undisputed World BBoy Series and a masters event called Undisputed Masters to determine the supreme individual Breaking champion. The events included in the Undipsuted World B-Boy Series are UK B-Boy Championships, Battle of the Year, R-16 Korea, Notorious IBE, Silverback Open Championships, Freestyle Session, Chelles Battle Pro, Outbreak Europe, Taipei BBoy City, Green Panda Festival and Legits Blast Winter. Former events for Undisputed include Red Bull BC One.

| Year | Red Bull BC One | UK BBoy Champs | Battle of the Year | R16 | IBE | Battle Pro | Outbreak | Freestyle Session | Silverback | Unbreakable^{2} | Taipei Bboy City | Legits Blast Winter | Green Panda | Nordic Qualifier | Undisputed |
|---|---|---|---|---|---|---|---|---|---|---|---|---|---|---|---|
| 2019 | (Netherlands) Menno | (United Kingdom) Kid Karam | (United States) Zeku | (Japan) Shade | (Canada) Phil Wizard | (Venezuela) Lil G | (United States) Victor | not held | not held | (Denmark) Zoopreme | (Canada) Illz | (United States) Victor | (Russia) Alkolil | (Russia) Grom | (Denmark) Zoopreme |
| 2018 | (Morocco) Lil Zoo | not held | (France) Dany | not held | (Canada) Phil Wizard | (Japan) Issei | (Russia) Cheerito | not held | (United States) Victor | (United States) Stripes | (Greece) Onel | (Poland) Greku | (Venezuela) Lil G | | (Canada) Phil Wizard |
| 2017 | (Netherlands) Menno | (United Kingdom) Sunni | (Greece) Onel | not held | (Ukraine) Kuzya | (Ukraine) Lussy Sky | (United States) Victor | (United States) Thesis | (Japan) Issei | (South Korea) Kill | (South Korea) Vero | not held | (United States) Thesis | | (United States) Victor |
| 2016 | (Japan) Issei | (United Kingdom) Sunni | (Portugal) Bruce Almighty | (Japan) Issei | (United States) Victor | (France) Soso | (Ukraine) Kuzya | (United States) El Niño | (United States) Thesis | (Ukraine) Kuzya | (Japan) Issei | not held | not held | | (United States) Thesis |
| 2015 | (United States) Victor | not held | (Netherlands) Menno | (Netherlands) Menno | (United Kingdom) Sunni | (France) Mounir | (United States) El Niño | (United States) Victor | (United States) Victor | (United Kingdom) Sunni | not held | not held | not held | | (United States) Victor |
| 2014 | (Netherlands) Menno | (Algeria) Lilou | (Russia) Alkolil | (Japan) Issei | (France) Tonio | (Netherlands) Menno | (Poland) Kleju | (United States) El Niño | (United States) Thesis ^{1} | (Portugal) Bruce Almighty | not held | not held | not held | | (Algeria) Lilou |
| 2013 | (South Korea) Hong10 | (Netherlands) Menno | (Netherlands) Menno | (Japan) Issei | (Japan) Issei | | | | | (Netherlands) Menno | | | | | |
| 2012 | (France) Mounir | (United States) Kareem | (Netherlands) Niek | (Japan) Issei | (Germany) Killa Sebi | | | | | (Netherlands) Menno | | | | | |
| 2011 | (United States) Roxrite | (United States) Morris | (Netherlands) Niek | (Japan) Taisuke | (Netherlands) Niek | | | | | (Brazil) Neguin | | | | | |
| 2010 | (Brazil) Neguin | (Russia) Flying Buddha | (United States) Thesis | (Netherlands) Niek | (Mexico) Hill | | | | | (United States) Thesis | | | | | |
| 2009 | (France) Lilou | (United States) Morris | (France) Lilou | (United States) Roxrite | | | | | | | | | | | |
| 2008 | (South Korea) Wing | (Russia) Kosto | | | (Netherlands) Wilson | | | | | | | | | | |
| 2007 | (United States) Ronnie | (Netherlands) Menno | | | | | | | | | | | | | |
| 2006 | (South Korea) Hong10 | (United Kingdom) Mouse | | | | | | | | | | | | | |
| 2005 | (France) Lilou | (United States) Roxrite | | | (Netherlands) Menno | | | | | | | | | | |
| 2004 | (United States) Omar | (South Korea) Physicx | | | (France) Abd-L | | | | | | | | | | |
| 2003 | | (United States) Ruen | | | (Germany) Airdit | | | | | | | | | | |
| 2002 | | (Belgium) Super G | | | | | | | | | | | | | |
| 2001 | | (Denmark) Sonic | | | | | | | | | | | | | |
| 2000 | | | | | | | | | | | | | | | |
| 1999 | | (United Kingdom) Tim Twist | | | | | | | | | | | | | |
| 1998 | | (United Kingdom) Evo | | | | | | | | | | | | | |
| 1997 | | (United Kingdom) Evo | | | | | | | | | | | | | |
| 1996 | | (United Kingdom) Evo | | | | | | | | | | | | | |

=== Success by country ===
Note: The following table only takes into consideration Red Bull BC One, Battle of the Year, UK B-Boy Championships and R-16 Korea as well as other Undisputed events.

| Country | RBBC1 | UK B-Boy | BOTY | R-16 | Other Undisputed events | Total Championships |
|---|---|---|---|---|---|---|
| United States | 4 | 5 | 2 | 1 | 13 | 25 |
| South Korea | 3 | 1 | 1 | 6 | 2 | 13 |
| Netherlands | 3 | 2 | 4 | 1 | 1 | 11 |
| Japan | 2 | 0 | 0 | 6 | 3 | 11 |
| United Kingdom | 0 | 8 | 0 | 0 | 1 | 9 |
| France | 2 | 0 | 2 | 0 | 3 | 7 |
| Russia | 0 | 2 | 1 | 0 | 2 | 5 |
| Ukraine | 0 | 0 | 0 | 0 | 4 | 4 |
| Cameroon | 0 | 0 | 0 | 0 | 1 | 1 |
| Canada | 0 | 0 | 0 | 0 | 3 | 3 |
| Algeria | 1 | 1 | 0 | 0 | 0 | 2 |
| Denmark | 0 | 1 | 0 | 0 | 1 | 2 |
| Greece | 0 | 0 | 1 | 0 | 1 | 2 |
| Poland | 0 | 0 | 0 | 0 | 2 | 2 |
| Venezuela | 0 | 0 | 0 | 0 | 2 | 2 |
| Belgium | 0 | 1 | 0 | 0 | 0 | 1 |
| Brazil | 1 | 0 | 0 | 0 | 0 | 1 |
| Morocco | 1 | 0 | 0 | 0 | 0 | 1 |
| Portugal | 0 | 0 | 1 | 0 | 0 | 1 |
| Philippines | 1 | 0 | 0 | 0 | 0 | 0 |

== Undisputed ==
The World B-Boy Series is the world's first B-Boying competition connecting eight different events around the world. Since 2014, the 8 solo B-Boy champions of these international events will meet in a new masters event called Undisputed and battle to establish who is the supreme champion, who is "Undisputed".

=== Undisputed Champions list ===
| Year | Masters event | Location | Name | Crew | City |
|---|---|---|---|---|---|
| 2019 | Undisputed V | Marrakesh, Morocco | (Canada) Phil Wizard | Wizards/United Rivals/7 Commandoz | Vancouver |
| 2018 | Undisputed IV | San Diego, United States | (United States) Victor | MF Kidz/Squadron | Kissimmee |
| 2017 | Undisputed III | Prague, Czech Republic | (United States) Thesis | Knuckleheads Cali | Phoenix |
| 2015 | Undisputed II | Marseille, France | (United States) Victor | MF Kidz/Squadron | Kissimmee |
| 2014 | Undisputed I | London, United Kingdom | (Algeria) Lilou | Pockemon | Lyon |

== World BBoy Series 2015 ==
Events participating in the 2015 World BBoy Series.

- Freestyle Session / Pro Breaking Tour, United States
- Battle of the Year, Braunschweig, Germany
- R-16 Korea, South Korea
- Silverback Open Championships / Pro Breaking Tour, Philadelphia, United States
- The Notorious IBE, Netherlands
- Outbreak Europe, Slovakia
- Chelles Battle Pro, Chelles, France
- Red Bull BC One World Finals, Rome, Italy

To qualify to Undisputed, b-boys had to win 1 of the 8 World B-Boy Series events. In the event that one b-boy won multiple championships, the next highest ranked b-boy would qualify.

- (United States) Victor Silverback Open Championships, Freestyle Session and Red Bull BC One winner
- (Netherlands) Menno R-16 Korea and Battle of the Year winner
- (France) Mounir Chelles Battle Pro winner
- (Poland) Kleju qualified as third highest rank among non-winners
- (Russia) Alkolil replaced Issei as fourth highest rank among non-winners
- (Canada) Fleau replaced El Niño as fifth highest rank among non-winners
- (Poland) Thomaz replaced Kareem as sixth highest rank among non-winners
- (Netherlands) Kid Colombia replaced Sunni

Issei ( (Japan) ) had originally qualified as highest rank among non-winners but was unavailable for competition. El Niño ( (United States) ) and Kareem ( (United States) ) had both qualified to Undisputed by winning Outbreak Europe and being second highest rank among non-winners respectively. However, both got injured prior to the competition. Sunni ( (United Kingdom) ), the Notorious IBE winner, was also ruled out due to an injury.

== World BBoy Series 2014 ==
Events participating in the 2014 World BBoy Series.

- The UK B-Boy Championships, UK
- Freestyle Session / Pro Breaking Tour, United States
- Battle of the Year, Germany
- R-16 Korea, South Korea
- The Notorious IBE, The Netherlands
- Outbreak Europe, Slovakia
- Chelles Battle Pro, France
- Red Bull BC One World Finals, France

Bboys who competed for Undisputed

- (Netherlands) Menno Chelles Battle Pro and RedBull BC One winner
- (Japan) Issei R16 Korea winner
- (Poland) Kleju Outbreak Europe winner
- (Russia) Alkolil Battle of the Year winner
- (France) Lilou UK Championships winner
- (United States) El Niño Freestyle Session winner
- (United States) Gravity qualified as highest rank among non-winners
- (United Kingdom) Spin replaced Tonio as second highest rank among non-winners

Tonio ( (France) ) had originally qualified to Undisputed by winning The Notorious IBE earlier in the year. However, due to visa complications, Tonio had to withdraw from the competition. As a result, Spin will be replacing Tonio for being the second ranked among non-winners.
