= Break'n Reality =

2012 documentary by Maximilian Haidbauer

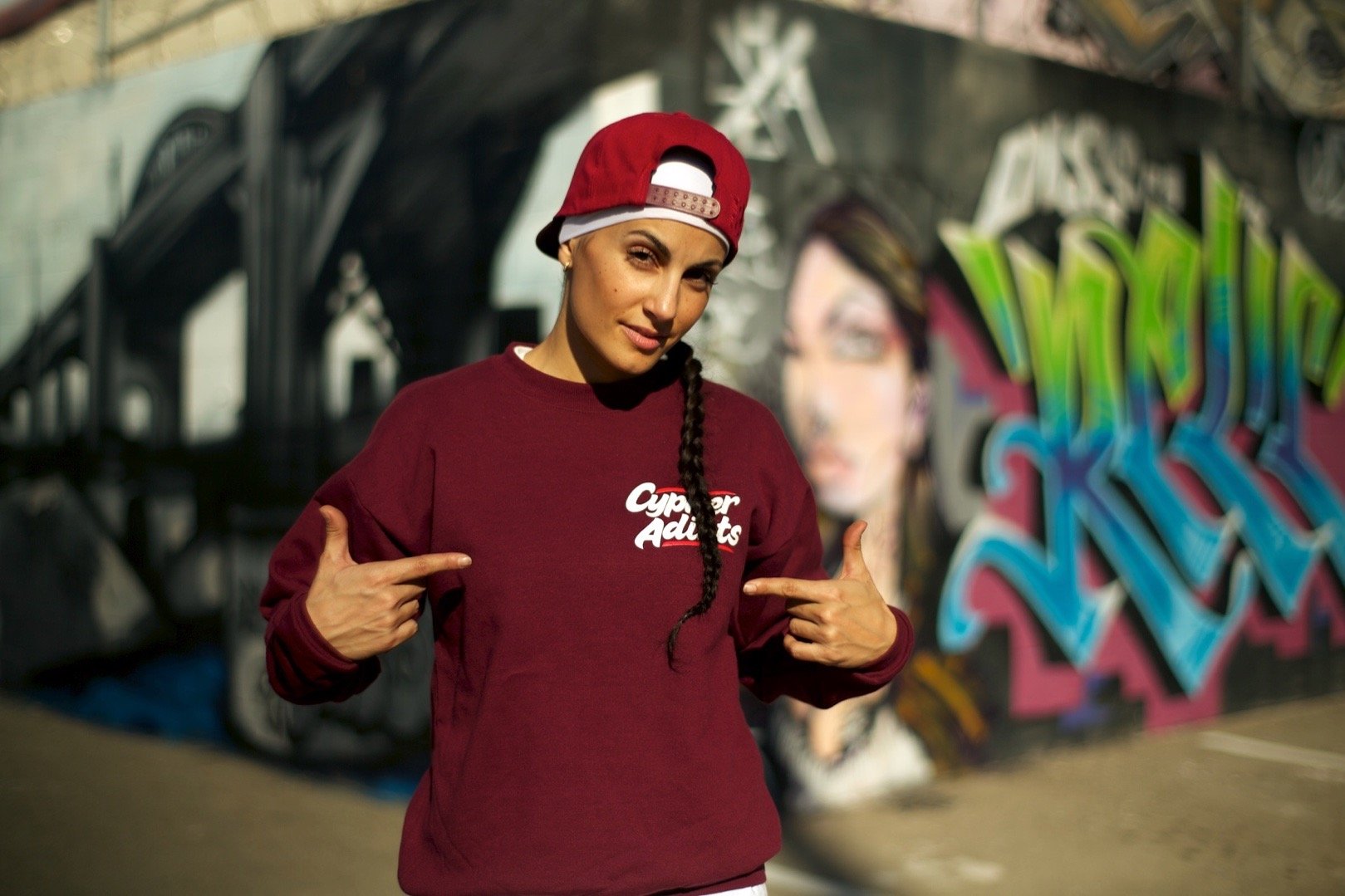
- B-Girls Jeskilz 2012
- Written by: Maximilian Haidbauer
- Directed by: Maximilian Haidbauer
- Starring: Roxrite, Lilou, Neguin, Kid David, Jeskilz, Ronnie
- Music by: Title music and narration by Rakaa
- Country of origin: Austria
- Original language: English

Production
- Producers: Abigail Shafran Mac Carthy, Maximilian Haidbauer, Doug Weitzbuch, Gabor Harrach
- Cinematography: Torsten Lapp, Maximilian Haidbauer
- Editors: Christian Vasallo, Philipp Kleibel
- Running time: 24 minutes

Original release
- Release: August 2012

Break'n Reality (2012–2014) is a documentary series, produced & directed by Maximilian Haidbauer. The show dives deep into the culture of Break Dance, also called B-Boying and follows some of the most respected dancers around the world as they compete for the world championship title. Season one titled" 3 B-Boys, 1 year, One Passion" featuring B-Boy Roxrite, B-Boy Lilou and B-Boy Neguin released August 2012. Season two titled "Making a living and keep'n it real " released in summer of 2014. The original theme song was recorded and performed by hip hop legend Rakaa / Dilated Peoples who also narrated the show.

== Synopsis ==
=== Season one ===
Today B-boying is an international art form. Every year, 16 of the world’s best B-boys compete in the Red Bull BC One to determine the world champion. The first season features three B-Boys: Roxrite, Lilou and Neguin, the defending world champion. The show follows their professional and personal lives as they each try to make their way to the BC one, and claim the title of world champion.

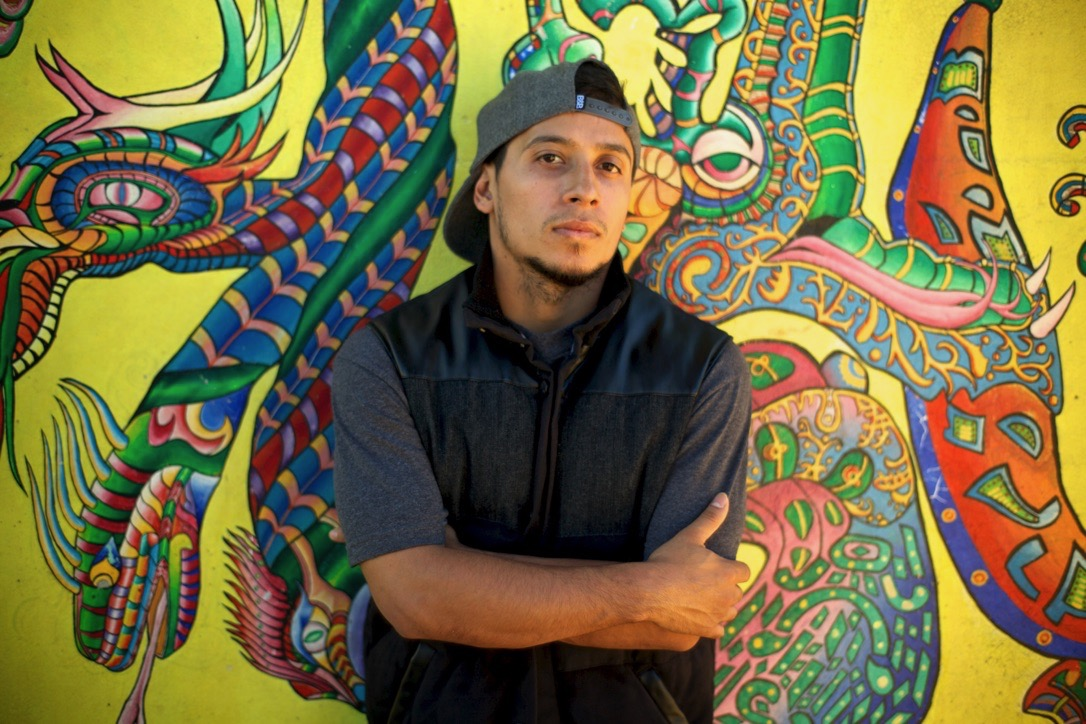
B-Boy Roxrite in San Diego

- Roxrite is an aging B-boyer in the history of the dance. He has won over 70 titles, as he approaches 30 he is worried about his legacy and the future of B-boying. The show will follow him as he travels around the country judging events and doing breakdance workshops, all the while trying to open up a B-boy school in his home town of San Diego.

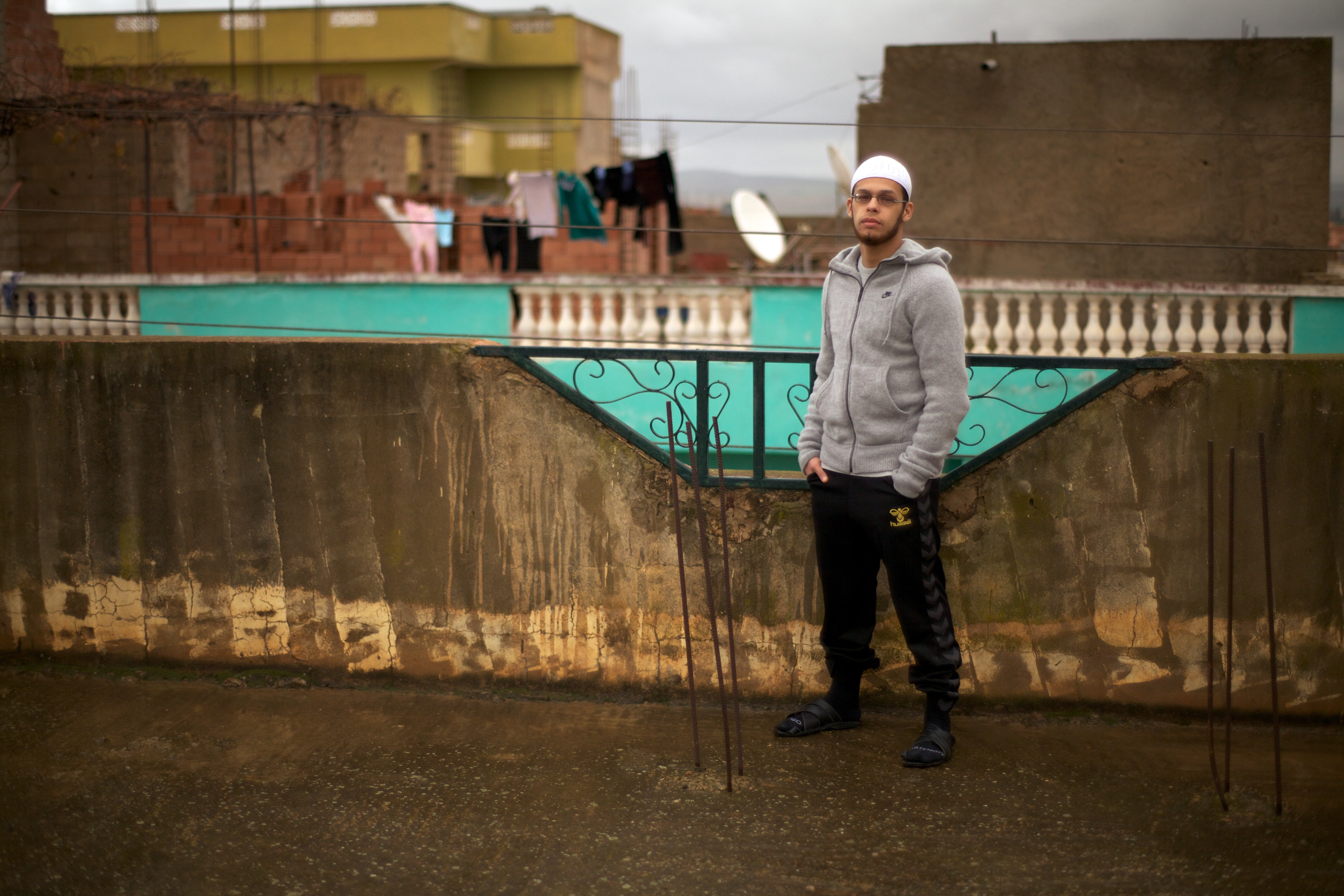
B-Boy Lilou in Tlemcen/Algeria

- Lilou is from Lyon France, he is somewhat of a provacteur, and when competing Lilou often wears a shirt that reads "I’m Muslim, Don’t Panic".“ But at his heart, this two time world champion is a family man.
- Neguin is a native Brazilian, currently living in New York City. He began studying Capoeira as a child, and his acrobatic breakdancing style is greatly influenced by the Brazilian martial art.

=== Season two ===
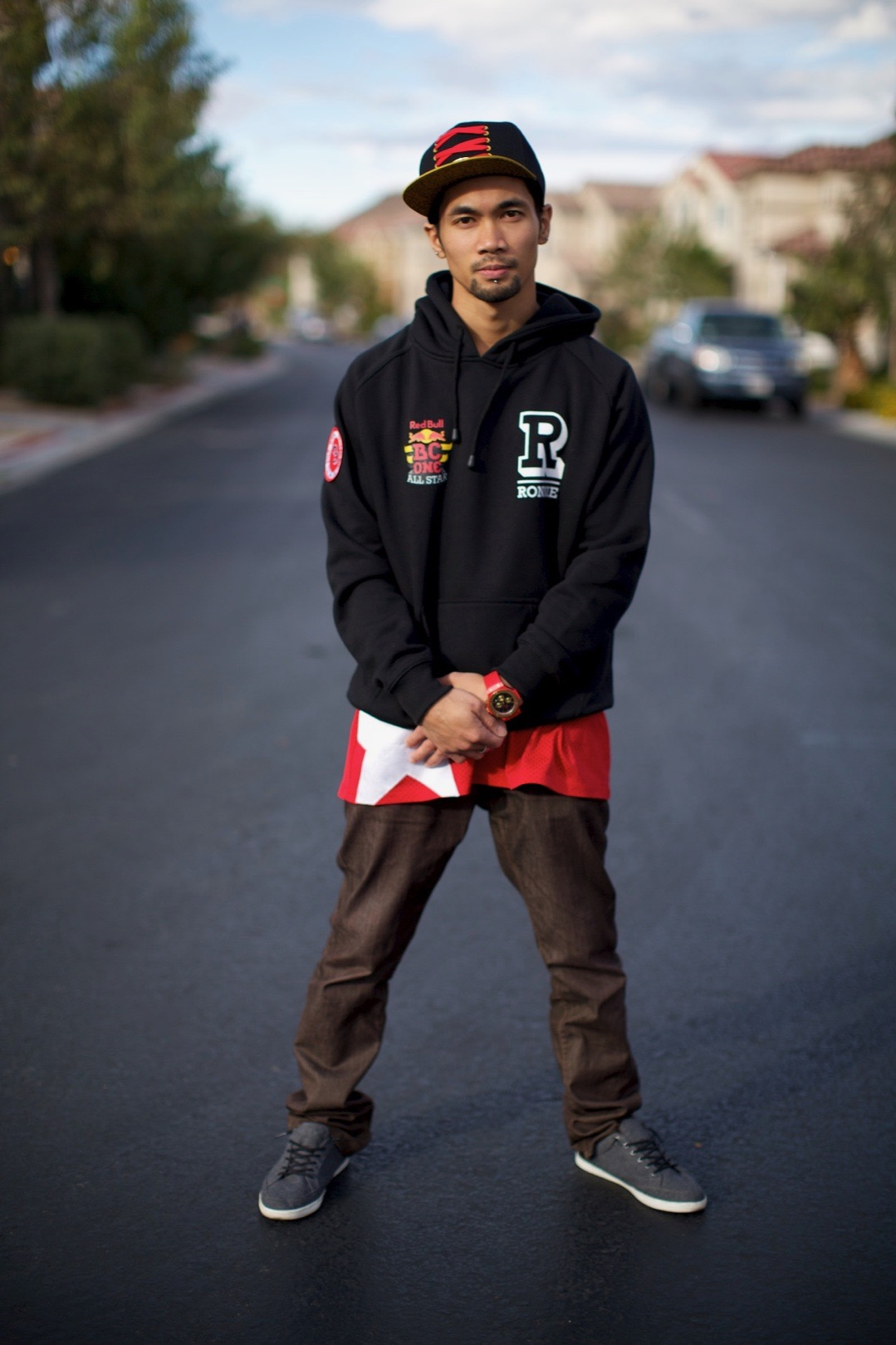
B-Boy Ronnie

This season, ‘Break’n Reality’ profiles four dancers as they tell the story of the culture of breaking, and the business that supports it.

- Kid David is from Hollywood, California, trying to win his first world title.
- Jeskilz is a French-Algerian B-Girl, dancing in LA and trying creating a new event. While recovering from surgery and training.
- Roxrite is a Mexican-American B-Boy dancer and reigning world champion who is preparing to defend his title in Rio. He must balance both his professional and personal life, winning the title and preparing for his wedding day.
- Ronnie is the winner of America’s Best Dance Crew and current member of the show Jabbawockeez.

This culminates in the world finals in Seoul, Korea, for the 10-year anniversary.

== Reception ==
Break'n Reality Season One received a bronze gold medal at the New York Festivals.
