= Silverback Open Championships =

International breakdancing competition

The Silverback Open Championships has been an international prize money breaking competition (b-boying and b-girling), with five editions held to date in Philadelphia, Pennsylvania, 2014 through 2018. Funded by Silverback Bboy Events, which supports the competitive breaking community philanthropically and through sponsorships, the Silverback Open Championships has been regarded as one of the premier International B-Boy Championships held every year it has been featured, with the most recent edition including 850 competitors from 50 countries. Silverback Open prize money pools have exceeded $100,000, and the event has attracted an international social media following accumulating millions of views. The Silverback Open event has been part of the Urban Dance & Educational Foundation's Pro Breaking Tour and Undisputed's World B-boy Series. The event has featured of many of the best and most well-known b-boys and b-girls around the world and has received praise throughout the breaking community for the high level of competition and for providing a warm welcome to guests and competitors alike.

== Silverback Open Championships 1-on-1 B-Boy results ==
Year	Winner	Crew	Runner-up	Crew
2018	(United States) Victor	MF Kidz/Squadron	(United States) Stripes	Flipside Kingz
2017	(Japan) Issei	Foundnation	(Russia) Alkolil	Original Breakers Circle
2016	(United States) Thesis	Knuckleheads Cali/Massive Monkees	(Japan) Issei	Foundnation
2015	(United States) Victor	MF Kidz/Squadron	(Japan) Issei	Foundnation
2014	(United States) Thesis	Knuckleheads Cali/Massive Monkees	(Netherlands) Niek	The Ruggeds

== Silverback Open Championships 3 vs 3 results ==
Year	Winner	Runner-up
2018	(South Korea) Hong 10, (Netherlands) Menno, (South Korea) Vero	(Ukraine) Lussy Sky, (Russia) Beetle, (Japan) Shigekix
2017	(South Korea) 7 Commandoz	(Russia) Robin, Alkolil, Bumblebee
2016	(Ukraine) Kuzya, (United Kingdom) Sunni, (South Korea) Pocket	(United States) Super Cr3w
2015	(South Korea) 7 Commandoz	(Poland) Polskee Flavour
2014	(United States) Squadron	(United States) Lionz of Zion

== Silverback Open Championships 1-on-1 B-Girl results ==
Year	Winner	Crew	Runner-up	Crew
2018	(United States) Logistx	Underground Flow	(Germany) Jilou	Jimakeno
2017	(Japan) Ami	Good Foot	(Japan) Ayumi	Body Carnival
2016	(Japan) Narumi	Body Carnival	(Finland) AT	Flow Mo Crew
2015	(Japan) Narumi	Body Carnival	(United States) Macca	360 Flava
2014	(United States) AB Girl	Domestic Apes	(United States) Macca	360 Flava

== 2018 ==
=== 2018 1-on-1 Solo Battle result ===
Round of 32
(Japan) Issei	7
(China) Quick	0
(France) Khalifa	2
(Canada) Phil Wizard	5
(Ukraine) Lussy Sky	6
(Canada) Fleau	1
(United States) Zeku	3
(Belarus) Wild Jerry	4
(United States) Icey Ives	1
(South Korea) Hong10	6
(United States) Morris	0
(Japan) Shigekix	7
(United States) Heat Rock	1
(United States) Stripes	6
(South Korea) Vero	3
(United States) Gravity	4
(Japan) Wingzero	4
(Netherlands) Menno	3
(France) Khalil	6
(Russia) Bumblebee	1
(Ukraine) Kuzya	4
(South Korea) Pocket	3
(United States) El Niño	6
(United States) Tata	1
(United States) Victor	5
(Russia) Beetle	2
(France) Lil Kev	3
(United Kingdom) Kid Karam	4
(Mexico) Dr. Hill	0
(Japan) Kazuki Rock	7
(United States) Thesis	5
(Venezuela) Lil G	2

Round of 16
(Japan) Issei	7|5
(Canada) Phil Wizard	0|2
(Ukraine) Lussy Sky	3|3
(Belarus) Wild Jerry	4|4
(Japan) Shigekix	5|4
(South Korea) Hong10	2|3
(United States) Gravity	2|2
(United States) Stripes	5|5
(Japan) Wingzero	1|3
(France) Khalil	6|4
(Ukraine) Kuzya	0|1
(United States) El Niño	7|6
(United States) Victor	6|7
(United Kingdom) Kid Karam	1|0
(United States) Thesis	2|0
(Japan) Kazuki Rock	5|7

Quarter-finals
(Japan) Issei	7|7
(Belarus) Wild Jerry	0|0
(Japan) Shigekix	3|1
(United States) Stripes	4|6
(France) Khalil	5|6
(United States) El Niño	2|1
(Japan) Kazuki Rock	0|1
(United States) Victor	7|6

Semi-finals
(United States) Stripes	4|0|5
(Japan) Issei	3|7|2
(United States) Victor	3|7|7
(France) Khalil	4|0|0

Final
(United States) Victor	6|4|5
(United States) Stripes	1|3|2

=== 2018 3 vs 3 Crew Battle result ===
Round of 16
(United Nations) Lussy Sky, (Russia) Beetle, (Japan) Shigekix	W
(United States) Monster Energy Breakers	L
(France) Lil Kev, (Ukraine) Kuzya, (Portugal) Lagaet	L
(Russia) (Mexico) Born to Burn	W
(United States) Knuckleheads Cali	W
(France) (Belgium) Funky Mindz	L
(United States) Monster Energy	L
(United Nations) Red Bull BC One All Stars	W
(United Nations) Plan B (Hong10, Menno, Vero)	W
(Germany) Gorilla Legion	L
(United States) Monster Force	W
(Japan) Body Carnival	L
(Russia) Predatorz	L
(Japan) Foundnation	W
(United States) Squadron	W
(United States) Flipside Technique	L

Quarter-finals
(United Nations) Lussy Sky, (Russia) Beetle, (Japan) Shigekix	W
(Mexico) Born to Burn	L
(United States) Knuckleheads Cali	W
(United Nations) Red Bull BC One All Stars	L
(United Nations) Plan B (Hong10, Menno, Vero)	W
(United States) Monster Force	L
(United States) Squadron	W
(Japan) Foundnation	L

Semi-finals
(United States) Knuckleheads Cali	L
(United Nations) Lussy Sky, (Russia) Beetle, (Japan) Shigekix	W
(United Nations) Plan B (Hong10, Menno, Vero)	W
(United States) Squadron	L

Final
(United Nations) 'Plan B' (Hong10, Menno, Vero)	W
(United Nations) Lussy Sky, (Russia) Beetle, (Japan) Shigekix	L

Winning b-boys: (South Korea) Vero, (Netherlands) Menno, and (South Korea) Hong 10.

== 2017 ==
=== 2017 1-on-1 Solo Battle result ===
Round of 32
(Japan) Issei	6
(United States) Tata	1
(Ukraine) Lussy Sky	3
(Taiwan) Harricane	4
(Netherlands) Kid Colombia	4
(Venezuela) Lil G	3
(Slovakia) Tomi	0
(South Korea) Vero	7
(Russia) Robin	1
(United States) Gravity	6
(France) Junior	1
(United States) Zeku	6
(France) Danny Dann	0
(Japan) Shigekix	7
(United States) MN Joe	2
(Netherlands) Menno	5
(United States) Roxrite	4
(Poland) Thomaz	3
(Russia) Alkolil	6
(United States) Ronnie	1
(Belgium) T-Rock	6
(Ukraine) Kuzya	1
(United States) El Niño	5
(Russia) Nord Diamond	2
(Japan) Taisuke	7
(Russia) Flying Buddha	0
(Netherlands) Xisco	2
(Finland) Focus	5
(United States) Omen	0
(Poland) Kleju	7
(United States) Victor	7
(Russia) Gun	0

Round of 16
(Japan) Issei	6*|7
(Taiwan) Harricane	0*|0
(Netherlands) Kid Colombia	3|3
(South Korea) Vero	4|4
(United States) Gravity	7|5
(United States) Zeku	0|2
(Japan) Shigekix	1|0
(Netherlands) Menno	6|7
(United States) Roxrite	0|0
(Russia) Alkolil	7|7
(Belgium) T-Rock	2|1
(United States) El Niño	5|6
(Japan) Taisuke	6|4
(Finland) Focus	1|3
(Poland) Kleju	3|1
(United States) Victor	4|6

Quarter-finals
(Japan) Issei	7|4
(South Korea) Vero	0|3
(United States) Gravity	1|1
(Netherlands) Menno	6|6
(Russia) Alkolil	5|7
(United States) El Niño	2|0
(Japan) Taisuke	1|6|0
(United States) Victor	6|1|7

Semi-finals
(Japan) Issei	7|5
(Netherlands) Menno	0|2
(Russia) Alkolil	6|7
(United States) Victor	1|0

Final
(Japan) Issei	0|6|7|6|4
(Russia) Alkolil	7|1|0|1|3

=== 2017 3 vs 3 Crew Battle result ===
Round of 16
(United States) Monster Energy	W
(France) Vagabonds	L
(United States) Super Cr3w	L
(United States) RAD Force	W
(Russia) Bumblebee Alkolil Robin	W
(Russia) Illusion of Exist	L
(China) Bboy World Asia	W
(Netherlands) Hustle Kidz	L
(European Union) Navi Solution	L
(South Korea) 7 Commandoz	W
(United States) Monster Bboys	W
(Japan) Foundnation	L
(Canada) United Rivals	W
(Poland) Polskee Flavor	L
(Japan) The Flooriorz	L
(United States) Havi Flava Renegade	W

Quarter-finals
(United States) Monster Energy	W
(United States) RAD Force	L
(Russia) Bumblebee Alkolil Robin	W
(China) Bboy World Asia	L
(South Korea) 7 Commandoz	W
(United States) Monster Bboys	L
(Canada) United Rivals	W
(United States) Havi Flava Renegade	L

Semi-finals
(United States) Monster Energy	L
(Russia) Bumblebee Alkolil Robin	W
(South Korea) 7 Commandoz	W
(Canada) United Rivals	L

Final
(South Korea) 7 Commandoz	W
(Russia) Bumblebee Alkolil Robin	L

Winning b-boys: (South Korea) Wing, (South Korea) Skim, and (South Korea) Hong 10.

== 2016 ==
The Silverback Open Championships ’16 took place on October 8 and 9 2016 at the YSC Sports complex outside of Philadelphia as part of the 2016 Pro Breaking Tour's Champions Series. The event was organized by Silverback Bboy Events and paid $100,000 in cash prize money, plus trips for several winners to the Freestyle Session World Finals in Los Angeles, as well as a trip to compete at Undisputed in Prague, Czech Republic for the 1-on-1 Open winner. A panel of seven judged the 1-on-1 Open, the 3-on-3 Open and the 1-on-1 Bgirl with two alternates in case a judge happened to be in the same crew as a competitor. The preliminary battles expanded the judging panel to five judges for each cypher.

=== 2016 1-on-1 Solo Battle result ===
Round of 32
(Japan) Issei	6
(South Korea) Pocket	1
(United States) Thriller	1
(Russia) Cheerito	6
(United States) Roxrite	5
(South Korea) Dol	2
(South Korea) Skim	3
(Finland) Focus	4
(Morocco) Lil Zoo	2
(Japan) Taisuke	5
(United Kingdom) Terra	0
(United States) El Niño	7
(Israel) Tricky	3*|2
(Venezuela) Lil G	3*|5
(United States) MN Joe	0
(United States) Remind	7
(United States) Thesis	6
(Netherlands) Niek	1
(United States) Victor	3*|6
(United States) Benstacks	3*|1
(United States) Gravity	6
(South Korea) Hong 10	1
(United Kingdom) Sunni	6
(Russia) Bootuz	1
(Netherlands) Kid Colombia	4
(Poland) Kleju	3
(United States) Kareem	3
(Ukraine) Robin	4
(United States) Morris	2
(Russia) Alkolil	5
(South Korea) Wing	6
(Ukraine) Lussy Sky	1

Round of 16
(Japan) Issei	7
(Russia) Cheerito	0
(United States) Roxrite	4
(Finland) Focus	3
(Japan) Taisuke	0
(United States) El Niño	7
(Venezuela) Lil G	0
(United States) Remind	7
(United States) Thesis	4
(United States) Victor	3
(United States) Gravity	6
(United Kingdom) Sunni	1
(Netherlands) Kid Colombia	1
(Ukraine) Robin	6
(Russia) Alkolil	7
(South Korea) Wing	0

Quarter-finals
(Japan) Issei	7|4
(United States) Roxrite	0|3
(United States) El Niño	1|7|7
(United States) Remind	6|0|0
(United States) Thesis	6|1|7
(United States) Gravity	1|6|0
(Ukraine) Robin	5|5
(Russia) Alkolil	2|2

Semi-finals
(Japan) Issei	6|1|4
(United States) El Niño	1|6|3
(United States) Thesis	5|7
(Ukraine) Robin	2|0

Final
(United States) Thesis	6|5|1
(Japan) Issei	1|2|6

=== 2016 3 vs 3 Crew Battle result ===
Round of 16
(Ukraine) Kuzya, (United Kingdom) Sunni, (South Korea) Pocket	W
(Finland) Flow Mo Crew	L
(Japan) Foundnation	L
(Ukraine) Eastside Bboys	W
(United States) Knuckleheads Cali	W
(Japan) Body Carnival	L
(United States) Style Elements	W
(United States) MF Kingz	L
(United States) Floor Renegades	L
(Ukraine) Navi Crew	W
(United States) Team Monster	W
(United Kingdom) Terra, (Netherlands) Niek, (France) Lilou	L
(United States) Super Cr3w	W
(United States) Rock Force	L
(South Korea) 7 Commandoz	W
(United Nations) Cheerito, Gun, Nasty Ray	L

Quarter-finals
(Ukraine) Kuzya, (United Kingdom) Sunni, (South Korea) Pocket	W
(Ukraine) Eastside Bboys	L
(United States) Knuckleheads Cali	L
(United States) Style Elements	W
(Ukraine) Navi Crew	L
(United States) Team Monster	W
(United States) Super Cr3w	W
(South Korea) 7 Commandoz	L

Semi-finals
(Ukraine) Kuzya, (United Kingdom) Sunni, (South Korea) Pocket	W
(United States) Style Elements	L
(United States) Team Monster	L
(United States) Super Cr3w	W

Final
(Ukraine) Kuzya, (United Kingdom) Sunni, (South Korea) Pocket.	W
(United States) Super Cr3w	L

Winning b-boys: (Ukraine) Kuzya, (United Kingdom) Sunni, and (South Korea) Pocket.

== 2015 ==
The Silverback Open Championships 2015 took place on October 10 and 11 2015 at the YSC Sports complex outside of Philadelphia as part of the 2015 Pro Breaking Tours Champions Series. The event was organized by Silverback Bboy Events and paid $90,150 in cash prize money, plus trips for several winners to the Freestyle Session World Finals in Los Angeles, as well as a trip to compete at Undisputed in Marseille, France for the 1-on-1 Open winner. The 1-on-1 Open and 1-on-1 B-girl winners also received a Mackie Freeplay Portable PA Speaker with the optional lithium-ion battery allowing for 10 hours of continuous music. A panel of seven judged the 1-on-1 Open, the 3-on-3 Open and the 1-on-1 B-girl with two alternates in case a judge happens to be in the same crew as a competitor. The preliminary battles expanded the judging panel to five judges for each cypher.

=== 2015 1-on-1 Solo Battle result ===
Round of 32
(United States) El Niño	1
(Netherlands) Xisco	6
(South Korea) Pocket	3
(Netherlands) Kid Columbia	4
(United States) Morris	2
(United States) Victor	5
(Russia) Cheerito	7
(Canada) Illz	0
(South Korea) Wing	6*
(United States) Scumbag Jose	0*
(Netherlands) Menno	6*
(United States) Luigi	0*
(United States) Moy	1
(Japan) Shigekix	6
(South Korea) Hong 10	5*
(United States) Ronnie	0*
(United States) Kareem	5
(Russia) Gun	2
(South Korea) Skim	2
(United States) Zeku	5
(United States) Ben Stacks	0*
(South Korea) Kill	6*
(Ukraine) Robin	1*
(Japan) Issei	5*
(United States) Gravity	6*
(United States) Ken Furry	0*
(United States) Nasty Ray	5
(Poland) Yarko	2
(Kazakhstan) Killa Kolya	1
(United Kingdom) Sunni	6
(Poland) Thomaz	4
(Russia) Alkolil	3

Round of 16
(Netherlands) Xisco	6|3|1
(Netherlands) Kid Columbia	1|4|6
(United States) Victor	1|4*|6*
(Russia) Cheerito	6|1*|0*
(South Korea) Wing	5*|7
(Netherlands) Menno	1*|0
(Japan) Shigekix	4*|0*|0
(South Korea) Hong 10	1*|6*|7
(United States) Kareem	7|7
(United States) Zeku	0|0
(South Korea) Kill	2|0*
(Japan) Issei	5|6*
(United States) Gravity	2*|1
(United States) Nasty Ray	4*|6
(United Kingdom) Sunni	6|6
(Poland) Thomaz	1|1

Quarter-finals
(Netherlands) Kid Columbia	1*|3
(United States) Victor	4*|3|5*
(South Korea) Wing	1*|4|1*
(South Korea) Hong 10	5*|3|5*
(United States) Kareem	2|1
(Japan) Issei	5|6
(United States) Nasty Ray	3|3
(United Kingdom) Sunni	4|4

Semi-finals
(United States) Victor	6|4*
(South Korea) Hong 10	1|1*
(Japan) Issei	5*|6
(United Kingdom) Sunni	1*|1

Final
(United States) Victor	3|4|6*
(Japan) Issei	4|3|0*

Victor ( (United States) ) earned the fifth bid to Undisputed at the end of the 2015 year by winning Silverback Open Championships 2015.

=== 2015 3 vs 3 Crew Battle result ===
Round of 16
(United States) Knuckleheads Cali	L
(Japan) Body Carnival	W
(Russia) Alkolil, Cheerito & Jamal	L
(United States) Flipside Havik	W
(South Korea) 7 Commandoz	W
(Ukraine) Top Eastside	L
(United States) Skillz Methodz	W
(United States) Squadron	L
(United States) Beast Coast	L
(Poland) Polskee Flavor	W
(United States) Super Cr3w	L
(Netherlands) The Ruggeds	W
(United States) Rock Force	W
(Japan) Foundnation	L
(United States) MF Kidz	L
(Netherlands) Hustle Kidz	W

Quarter-finals
(Japan) Body Carnival	W
(United States) Flipside Havik	L
(South Korea) 7 Commandoz	W
(United States) Skillz Methodz	L
(Poland) Polskee Flavor	W
(Netherlands) The Ruggeds	L
(United States) Rock Force	W
(Netherlands) Hustle Kidz	L

Semi-finals
(Japan) Body Carnival	L
(South Korea) 7 Commandoz	W
(Poland) Polskee Flavor	W
(United States) Rock Force	L

Final
(South Korea) 7 Commandoz	W
(Poland) Polskee Flavor	L

7 Commandoz participating b-boys: (South Korea) Hong 10, (South Korea) Wing, and (South Korea) Skim.

== 2014 ==
The Silverback Open Championships ’14 took place on October 11 and 12 2014 at the YSC Sports complex outside of Philadelphia as part of the 2014 Pro Breaking Tours Champions Series. The event was organized by organized by Silverback Bboy Events and paid $58,400 in cash prize money, a $10,000 Breitling watch, plus trips for several winners to the Freestyle Session World Final's in San Diego. A panel of seven judged the Open 1-on-1, the Open 3-on-3 and the B-girl 1-v-1.

=== 2014 1-on-1 Solo Battle result ===
Round of 32
(United States) Gravity	W
(United States) Shorty Brick	L
(Ukraine) Pluto	W
(United States) Lancer	L
(United States) Moy	W
(United States) Mig187	L
(United States) Morris	W
(United States) Jeremy	L
(Australia) Blond	W
(United States) Fantum	L
(Netherlands) Menno	L
(United States) Victor	W
(United States) Scumbag Jose	L
(United States) Thesis	W
(United States) El Niño	W
(Ukraine) Intact	L
(United States) Bebo	L
(United States) Ronnie	W
(United States) Flexum	L
(South Korea) Wing	W
(United States) Tata	W
(United States) MN Joe	L
(Netherlands) Niek	W
(United States) Wealthy	L
(United States) Kareem	W
(United States) Stripes	L
(United States) Nasty Ray	W
(United States) Prada G	L
(United States) Ronnie Ruen	W
(United States) Palmer	L
(Japan) Issei	W
(United States) Knuckles	L

Round of 16
(United States) Gravity	W
(Ukraine) Pluto	L
(United States) Moy	W
(United States) Morris	L
(Australia) Blond	W
(United States) Victor	L
(United States) Thesis	W
(United States) El Niño	L
(United States) Ronnie	L
(South Korea) Wing	W
(United States) Tata	L
(Netherlands) Niek	W
(United States) Kareem	W
(United States) Nasty Ray	L
(United States) Ronnie Ruen	W
(Japan) Issei	L

Quarter-finals
(United States) Gravity	L
(United States) Moy	W
(Australia) Blond	L
(United States) Thesis	W
(South Korea) Wing	L
(Netherlands) Niek	W
(United States) Kareem	W
(United States) Ronnie Ruen	L

Semi-finals
(United States) Moy	L
(United States) Thesis	W
(Netherlands) Niek	W
(United States) Kareem	L

Final
(United States) Thesis	W
(Netherlands) Niek	L

=== 2014 3 vs 3 Crew Battle result ===
Round of 16
(United States) Squadron	W
(United States) Brickheadz/Phase II	L
(United States) Killa Ground Flow	W
(United States) Fallen Kings	L
(Ukraine) Ruffneck Attack	W
(United States) Raw Phlow	L
(United States) Havikoro	W
(United States) Street Masters	L
(United States) United Outkast	L
(United States) Lionz of Zion	W
(United States) Floor Obsession	L
(United States) Last Samurai	W
(United States) Beast Coast	W
(United States) Mighty Zulu Kingz	L
(United States) Flava Fenz	L
(United States) Super Cr3w	W

Quarter-finals
(United States) Squadron	W
(United States) Killa Ground Flow	L
(Ukraine) Ruffneck Attack	W
(United States) Havikoro	L
(United States) Lionz of Zion	W
(United States) Last Samurai	L
(United States) Beast Coast	W
(United States) Super Cr3w	L

Semi-finals
(United States) Squadron	W
(Ukraine) Ruffneck Attack	L
(United States) Lionz of Zion	W
(United States) Beast Coast	L

Final
(United States) Squadron	W
(United States) Lionz of Zion	L

Squadron participating b-boys: (United States) Nasty Ray, (United States) Moy, and (United States) Prada G.
