= Roxrite =

American b-boy

B-boy RoxRite
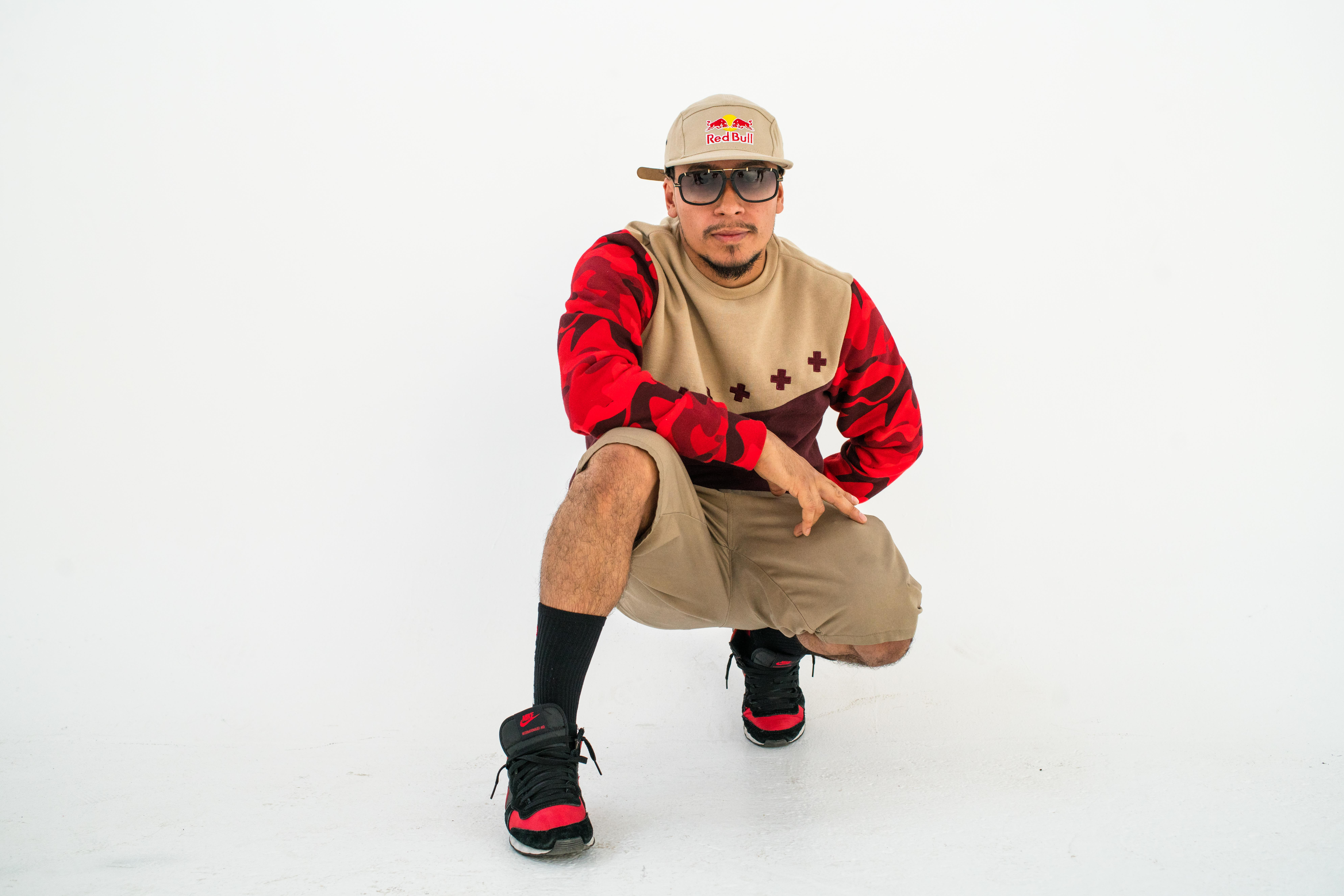
- Born: Omar Delgado Macias; April 6, 1982 (age 42); Guadalajara, Jalisco, Mexico
- Known for: Breakdancing
- Awards: Spy Award; 2012 RSC 35th Anniversary; B-Boy of the Year; 2011 World of Dance

Omar "RoxRite" Delgado Macias (born April 6, 1982) is a competitive b-boy from Windsor, California. As of March 2018, he has won 100 titles including the UK B-Boy Championships (2005), R16 (2009), Red Bull BC One (2011) and Freestyle Session (2009, 2013, and 2014). (Note: He won Freestyle Session 2013 with his crew Squadron.)

== Life ==
RoxRite was born in Guadalajara, Mexico and raised in Windsor, California. His family moved to the United States when he was six years old, but he wasn't introduced to breaking until he was 12. Although he was born in Mexico, RoxRite represents the U.S. in competition because the U.S. is where he was raised and where he learned breaking. He won his first international b-boy title in France in 2003.

His style of b-boying led to the name 'Roxrite,' a term referring to how he always rocked right (i.e. danced the right way). Roxrite is one of three dancers from the US to have claimed the Red Bull BC One title.

RoxRite appeared in a documentary about breaking called Turn It Loose (2010) and in two seasons of the Red Bull-produced online reality series Break'n Reality (2012 and 2014). In 2013, he was on the selection committee for the B-Boy Scholarship Fund sponsored by TheBBoySpot.com. In 2015, he co-directed an online series with b-boy Ali "Lilou" Ramdani called Crew Code. He is a member of four b-boy crews: Renegades, Squadron, Break Disciples, and Red Bull BC One All-Stars.

External videos
- "RoxRite’s Journey to 100 Wins" by Red Bull BC One.

== Titles ==
Win#	Date	Event	Location	Battle Type
1	July 1998	Hip Hop on Stage 4	Windsor, CA, USA	2v2
2	July 1998	Escape	Santa Rosa, CA, USA	1v1
3	August 1998	BBoy Throw Down	Madera, CA, USA	1v1
4	August 1998	Hip Hop Olympics	Sacramento, CA, USA	1v1
5	October 1998	Wild Style Battle	Sacramento, CA, USA	3v3
6	February 1999	It's a Love Thang	Santa Rosa, CA, USA	crew
7	March 1999	Battle of the Illest	Windsor, CA, USA	2v2
8	July 1999	BBoy Battle Royal	Sacramento, CA, USA	1v1
9	January 2000	Local Spotlight	Santa Rosa, CA, USA	crew
10	June 2000	Mighty 4	Palo Alto, CA, USA	crew
11	July 2000	Showdown	San Francisco, CA, USA	crew
12	September 2000	Hard Lino 3	Calgary, Alberta, CA	crew
13	November 2000	Mighty 4 Appreciation Day	Palo Alto, CA, USA	1v1
14	November 2000	BBoy Battle	Petaluma, CA, USA	1v1
15	April 2001	King of the Mountain 2	San Jose, CA, USA	1v1
16	August 2001	Hip Hop Nation Dance Battle	San Francisco, CA, USA	crew
17	September 2001	Breakers at War	San Francisco, CA, USA	1v1
18	January 2002	Freestyle Session 7	Los Angeles, CA, USA	crew
19	October 2002	Battle Kings	San Francisco, CA, USA	crew
20	December 2002	Street Legends	Sacramento, CA, USA	1v1
21	March 2003	Breaking 4 Peace	San Francisco, CA, USA	2v2
22	March 2003	Octagon	San Jose, CA, USA	1v1
23	April 2003	BBoy Masters Pro-Am	San Francisco, CA, USA	1v1
24	June 2003	King of the Mountain 3	San Jose, CA, USA	2v2
25	July 2003	Mighty 4 Footwork Battle	San Jose, CA, USA	1v1
26	October 2003	BBoy Masters Pro-Am	Toulouse, FR	1v1
27	October 2003	Beat Box	Modesto, CA, USA	2v2
28	January 2004	Of Mind Body and Soul	Salt Lake City, UT, USA	crew
29	March 2004	A New Hope	San Jose, CA, USA	crew
30	April 2004	Toe 2 Toe	Greensville, N.C., USA	2v2
31	July 2004	Battle Ave.	Fairfield, CA, USA	1v1
32	October 2004	Spinfactor California	Vallejo, CA, USA	2v2
33	November 2004	Pandora's Box	San Jose, CA, USA	1v1
34	December 2004	Euro Pro Am	Toulouse, France	crew
35	February 2005	Ashes 2 Ashes	Portland, OR, USA	1v1
36	April 2005	Surface Scuffin	Oakland, CA, USA	1v1
37	October 2005	U.K. Championships 2005	United Kingdom	1v1
38	December 2005	Olympic Masters	Toulouse, France	crew
39	April 2006	Massive Monkee Day	Showbox, Seattle, WA, USA	3v3
40	May 2006	Ashes 2 Ashes: King of the HIll	Portland, OR, USA	1v1
41	July 2006	2 Man Platoon	San Francisco, CA, USA	2v2
42	July 2006	Breakdown 16	San Francisco, CA, USA	1v1
43	July 2006	Diamond Studded Bullets	Oakland, CA, USA	crew
44	July 2006	Hip Hop International World Battle	Los Angeles, CA, USA	2v2
45	August 2006	Outbreak 3	Miami, FL, USA	2v2
46	September 2006	B1 Championships	Osaka, JP	2v2
47	January 2007	Style Wars	Santa Fe, NM, USA	2v2
48	February 2007	Out for Fame Bay	Oakland, CA, USA	crew
49	March 2007	Chelles Battle Pro	Chelles, FR	crew
50	April 2007	2 Man Platoon Championships	San Francisco, CA, USA	2v2
51	April 2007	Euro Battle 2007	Porto, PT	crew
52	October 2007	B1 One Championships	Osaka, JP	2v2
53	October 2007	Skillz in the City of Holy Faith	Santa Fe, NM, USA	crew
54	January 2008	Wreck Room 6	Columbus, Ohio, USA	crew
55	April 2008	Euro Battle 2008	Porto, PT	crew
56	May 2008	Battle Time 2	Bayside, CA, USA	2v2
57	June 2008	All Nation NY Heat	Brooklyn, NY, USA	1v1
58	August 2008	Sirqix 3	Tampa Bay, FL, USA	crew
59	September 2008	Falling with Style 4	Minnesota	crew
60	November 2008	Claws Out 3	Los Angeles, CA, USA	crew
61	November 2008	Abnormal Abilities	San Francisco, CA, USA	2v2
62	March 2009	2 on 2	Los Angeles, CA, USA	2v2
63	August 2009	Freestyle Session	Los Angeles, CA, USA	crew
64	September 2009	R16	Seoul, SK	1v1
65	November 2009	Claws Out 4	Los Angeles, CA, USA	crew
66	January 2010	Havikoro 10 Year Anniversary	Houston, TX, USA	2v2
67	February 2010	Unbreakable	Richmond, VA, USA	crew
68	March 2010	Bashville Stampede	Nashville TN, USA	3v3
69	March 2010	Cypher City Footwork Battle	San Diego, CA, USA	1v1
70	May 2010	Warsaw Challenge	Warsaw, PL	crew
71	July 2010	Poland Battle	Poland	3v3
72	July 2010	Dance Camp Battle	Czech Republic	crew
73	September 2010	All the Way Live	Fremont, CA, USA	crew
74	December 2010	Outbreak 5	Orlando, FL, USA	2v2
75	March 2011	Circles	Madison, VA, USA	crew
76	June 2011	Sirqix 6	Tampa Bay, FL, USA	2v2
77	November 2011	Red Bull BC One	Moscow, RU	1v1
78	February 2012	The Bug Out	San Diego, CA, USA	1v1
79	March 2012	Adidas Original	Warsaw, PL	1v1
80	February 2013	BBoyz in the Hood	Tustin, CA, USA	2v2
81	May 2013	Circle Industry 3	Salzburg, AT	2v2
82	May 2013	Checkmate	Salzburg, AT	crew
83	June 2013	Freestyle Session Qualifier	Orlando, FL, USA	3v3
84	December 2013	Freestyle Session World Finals	Tokyo, JP	1v1
85	January 2014	Bedlam Jam	Los Angeles, CA, USA	crew
86	November 2014	Freestyle Session World Finals	San Diego, CA, USA	2v2
87	December 2014	2 Birds 1 Stone	San Jose, CA, USA	2v2
88	July 2015	Outbreak World Finals	Banska Bastrica, SL	2v2
89	September 2015	Renegades 32 Year Anniversary	San Francisco, CA, USA	3v3
90	March 2016	1 Round Killer	St. Louis, MO, USA	1v1
91	April 2016	UK BBoy Championships World Finals	London, UK	crew
92	June 2017	United Styles	Boston, MA, USA	4v4
93	July 2017	Style Elements Anniversary	San Jose, CA, USA	3v3
94	July 2017	The Get Down	San Diego, CA, USA	2v2
95	September 2017	Break 2 Beat 10 Year Anniversary	Germany	3v3
96	November 2017	Sopitas Con Huevo 11 year anniversary	Tijuana, MX	2v2
97	January 2018	Fatal Sting	San Diego, CA, USA	2v2 (Bonnie & Clyde)
98	January 2018	The King of What?	Baltimore, MD, USA	1v1
99	January 2018	Undisputed World Finals	San Diego, CA, USA	3v3
100	March 2018	Circle Industry	Salzburg, AUT	crew
