= Freestyle Session =

Freestyle Session is a b-boy competition held every year which crowns the best crew in the world. It is sanctioned by the Urban Dance & Educational Foundation and part of the Pro Breaking Tour and Undisputed's World BBoy Series. Originally held only in the United States, Freestyle Session is now being recognized worldwide. Most years have featured a 3 on 3 battle, but formats have varied over the years, from a 2 on 2 to a 10 on 10 full crew battle. Freestyle Session is most well known as a b-boy event, but has also featured b-girl, youth breaking, popping, and open styles competitions, among others

In 2013, Freestyle Session set off to raise the bar of International Competition with a series of events from local preliminaries to Regional Qualifiers and ultimately the Freestyle Session World Finals to find out who is the best crew in the World. Since 2014, Freestyle Session partnered up with The World BBoy Series and helped create Undisputed, an event to crown the solo world bboy champion.

== Freestyle Session Championship results ==
Year	Edition	First place	Second place	Third/Fourth place
2026	29	(Japan) Foundnation	(Japan) Body Carnival	(Japan) Nine States B-Boys / (South Korea) (Japan) FlowXL
2025	28	(United States) (Japan) Gun Smoke by Nature	(United States) BreakinMIA	(Canada) Corrupt Path / (Russia) Bumblebee & Grom
2024	27	(Japan) XII After Ours	(Ukraine) Green Panda	(Italy) Flexible Flav / (Japan) Foundnation
2023	26	(United States) BreakinMIA	(Canada) (United Kingdom) (Morocco) Red Bull BC One All-Stars 2	(United States) Rock Force / (Netherlands) (United States) Red Bull BC One All-Stars 1
2022	25	(Netherlands) (United States) Ruggeds/Squadron	(United Nations) Red Bull BC One All-Stars	(South Korea) FlowXL Kings / (United States) Vicious by Nature
2021	23	(United States) Rock Force	(United States) Breakmatic	(United States) (Ukraine) (Canada) (Brazil) Red Bull BC One Squad / (United States) BreakinMIA
2019	22	(United States) (Venezuela) (Netherlands) Red Bull BC One All-Stars	(United States) Renegade Lords	(Belgium) Belgian With Attitude / (United States) Rock Force
2018	21	(South Korea) Red Bull BC One All-Stars	(Russia) Bring It Back Squad	(Japan) Found Carnival / (United States) Monster RAD
2017	20	(United States) (South Korea) (France) Monster Bboys	(United States) The Squadron	(Portugal) Momentum / Team Ukraine
2016	19	(Japan) Foundnation	(Poland) Polskee Flavour	(Canada) United Rivals / (Russia) Predatorz
2015	18	(South Korea) (Canada) 7 Commandoz	(Japan) Found Carnival	(United States) Last Rock Coast / (Japan) Gun Smoke Breakers
2014	17	(United States) The Squadron	(Russia) Top 9	(United States) Concrete Docious FX / (Ukraine) Ruffneck Crew
2013	16	(United States) The Squadron	(Poland) Polskee Flavour	(Japan) Body Carnival / (Japan) The Flooriorz
2012	15	(United States) Skill Brat Renegades	(Russia) Top 9	(United States) Dynasty Descendants / (United States) Lionz of Zion
2011	14	(South Korea) Jinjo	(United States) Renegades	(United States) Skillz Method II / (United States) Havikoro
2010	13	(United States) Killafornia	(United States) Massive Monkees	(United States) SD Syndicate / (United States) Dynamic Rockers
2009	12	(United States) The Squadron	(United States) Monsta Squad	(Netherlands) Hustle Kidz / (United States) Mighty Zulu Kingz
2008	11	(United States) Natural Flava	(Japan) Foundnation	(United States) Killafornia / (United States) Mighty Zulu Kingz
2007	10	(United States) Mighty Zulu Kingz	(South Korea) Gamblerz	(South Korea) Drifterz / (United States) Furious Soldier
2006	8	(United States) Killafornia	(United States) Massive Monkees	
2005	Special Edition Korea	(France) Pockemon	(United States) Massive Monkees	(South Korea) Project Soul / (United States) Havikoro
2004	7	(United States) Killafornia	(United States) Skill Methods/Ground Zero	
2003	Special Edition Bumbershoot	(United States) Skill Brat Kings	(United States) Massive Monkees	
2001	6	(United States) Cali Texas	(United States) Massive Monkees	
1999	5	(United States) Rock Force/Rythm Bugz	(United States) Havikoro	
1999	4	(United States) Beans and Rice	(United States) Battle Utensils	
1999	FSS SF	(United States) Stylelements	(United States) Soul Control	
1998	3	(United Nations) Flying Tortillas	(United States) Soul Control	
1998	2	(United States) Unknown Bboys		Exhibition Battle - (United States) Soul Control vs (Japan) Kaiten Club
1997	1	(United States) Soul Control/Abstrakt Flavor/Foot Soldiers		3 Way Tie for First as it did not complete

== Freestyle Session Solo Champions results ==
From 2014, the winner of Freestyle Session Solo qualifies to Undisputed.

Year	Winner	Crew
2017	(United States) Thesis	Knuckleheads Cali/Massive Monkees/Fresh Descendants/TheM Team/Last Samurai/The Legendary P-Boys
2016	(United States) El Niño	Squadron/Floorlords
2015	(United States) Victor	MF Kidz/Squadron
2014	(United States) El Niño	Squadron/Floorlords

== 2019 ==
Location: San Diego

Round of 32
(United Nations) BC One All-Stars	W
(United States) "Windbreakers"	L
(Colorado) Pelisgrosos	L
(Japan) Body Carnival	W
(United States) Motion Disorderz	W
(Hong Kong) Crossover Crew	L
(United Nations) NarekTheShow, MicShaggy, Jerry	L
(United States) Rock Force	W
(United States) HZK Floor Gangz	L
(United Nations) Nothing 2 Lose	W
(Australia) RAW Minds	L
(United States) Monster	W
(Mexico) Hoolukunz Rhythm Invade	L
(Russia) 3:16	W
(United Kingdom) Smac 19	L
(United States) 808 Breakers	W
(Kazakhstan) CrazyStan	W
(United States) Break Syndicate	L
(United States) Monster MZK	W
(United States) Knucklehead Zoo	L
Belgium With Attitude	W
(South Korea) Drifterz	L
(China) Juice Crew	W
(United States) Underground Flow	L
(Hong Kong) Boogie Renaissance	W
(Russia) Illusion of Exist	L
(Canada) United Rivals	L
(Germany) German Ingenuity	W
(Japan) Ariya	L
(United States) Renegade Lords	W
(Russia) Bring It Back	W
(United States) Florida H-Town	L

Round of 16
(Kazakhstan) CrazyStan	W
(Hong Kong) Boogie Renaissance	L
(Germany) German Ingenuiety	L
(United States) Renegade Lords	W
(United States) Motion Disorderz	L
(United States) Rock Force	W
(United States) 808 Breakers	L
(United Nations) Nothing 2 Lose	W
(China) Juice Crew	L
(United States) Monster	W
(Japan) Body Carnival	W
(Russia) Bring it Back	L
(United States) Monster MZK	L
Belgium With Attitude	W
(Russia) 3:16	L
(United Nations) BC One All-Stars	W

Quarter-finals
Belgium With Atittude	W
(Japan) Body Carnival	L
(Kazakhstan) CrazyStan	L
(United Nations) BC One All-Stars	W
(United States) Rock Force	W
(United States) Monster	L
(United Nations) Nothing 2 Lose	L
(United States) Renegade Lords	W

Semi-finals
(United Nations) BC One All-Stars	W
(United States) Rock Force	L
Belgium With Attitude	L
(United States) Renegade Lords'	W

Final
(United Nations) BC One All-Stars	W
(United States) Renegade Lords	L

== 2018 ==
Location: Los Angeles

Date: November 10–11, 2018

Individuals in bold won their respective battles.

Round of 32
(South Korea) **BC One All-Stars**	**W**
(Mexico) Kadetes Del Toke	L
(United States) Monster Bboys	L
(Japan) **Foundnation**	**W**
(Israel) **Unstoppabullz**	**W**
(Belgium) Team Shmetta	L
(United States) Box Won & Breeze	L
(United States) **Rock Force**	**W**
(United States) Kid Cruz & Ali	L
(Japan) **Body Carnival**	**W**
(France) Total Feeling	L
(United States) **Knuckleheads Cali**	**W**
(Mexico) Unik Breakers	L
(United States) **Rock Force Crew**	**W**
(United States) Killafornia	L
(Japan) **Found Carnival**	**W**
(United States) **Squadron**	**W**
(Norway) Exaggerate & Tunde	L
(United States) **Monster RAD**	**W**
(Singapore) Checkered Minds	L
(Japan) **Style Vale Tudo**	**W**
(United States) Pnut & Phil	L
(Brazil) **Funk Fockers**	**W**
(China) STO Crew	L
(United States) **Backyard Funk**	**W**
(Taiwan) Reformerz	L
(China) Bomb Jam	L
(Russia) **Illusion of Exist / OBC**	**W**
(Australia) Skill@Will	L
(United States) **Renegade Rockers**	**W**
(Russia) **Bring It Back**	**W**
(Hong Kong) Boogie Renaissance	L

Round of 16
(South Korea) **BC One All-Stars**	**W**
(Japan) Foundnation	L
(Israel) Unstoppabullz	L
(United States) **Rock Force**	**W**
(Japan) Body Carnival	L
(United States) **Knuckleheads Cali**	**W**
(United States) Rock Force Crew	L
(Japan) **Found Carnival**	**W**
(United States) Squadron	L
(United States) **Monster RAD**	**W**
(Japan) **Style Vale Tudo**	**W**
(Brazil) Funk Fockers	L
(United States) Backyard Funk	L
(Russia) **Illusion of Exist / OBC**	**W**
(United States) Renegade Rockers	L
(Russia) **Bring It Back**	**W**

Quarter-finals
(South Korea) **BC One All-Stars**	**W**
(United States) Rock Force	L
(United States) Knuckleheads Cali	L
(Japan) **Found Carnival**	**W**
(United States) **Monster RAD**	**W**
(Japan) Style Vale Tudo	L
(Russia) Illusion of Exist / OBC	L
(Russia) **Bring It Back**	**W**

Semi-finals
(South Korea) **BC One All-Stars**	**W**
(Japan) Found Carnival	L
(United States) Monster RAD	L
(Russia) **Bring It Back**	**W**

Final
(South Korea) **BC One All-Stars**	**W**
(Russia) Bring It Back	L

== 2017 ==
Location: San Diego

Date: August 26–27, 2017

Individuals in bold won their respective battles.

Round of 16
(United States) **Thesis**	**W**
(United States) Omen	L
(United States) **Saewl**	W
(Canada) Phil	L
(Japan) Shigekix	L
(United States) **Moy**	**W**
(United States) Nico	L
(United States) **Ronnie**	**W**
(United States) **El Niño**	**W**
(United States) Frankie	L
(Norway) Exaggerate	L
(United States) **Buckshot**	**W**
(United States) Lil Rock	L
(United States) **Remind**	**W**
(United States) Zeku	L
(United States) **Gravity**	**W**

Quarter-finals
(United States) **Thesis**	**W**
(United States) Saewl	L
(United States) **Moy**	**W**
(United States) Ronnie	L
(United States) **El Niño**	**W**
(United States) Buckshot	L
(United States) **Remind**	**W**
(United States) Gravity	L

Semi-finals
(United States) **Thesis**	**W**
(United States) Moy	L
(United States) **El Niño**	**W**
(United States) Remind	L

Final
(United States) **Thesis**	**W**
(United States) El Niño	L
Third place

=== 20th Anniversary: The Return of the Crew Battle ===
Location: Los Angeles

Date: November 11–12, 2017

Individuals in bold won their respective battles.

Round of 32
(United States) **Concrete All Stars**	**W**
(China) Skechers All Stars	L
(United Nations) Floorgangz	L
(Japan) **Waseda Breakers**	**W**
(United States) **808 Breakers**	**W**
(Japan) Good Foot	L
(Netherlands) Fresh All Stars	L
(United Nations) **Monster Bboys**	**W**
(Israel) Unstoppabbullz	L
(United States) **Knuckleheads Cali**	**W**
(United Nations) Ill Abilities	L
(Portugal) **Momentum**	**W**
(Taiwan) Top Coalition	L
(Netherlands) **The Ruggeds**	**W**
(Mexico) Kadetes del Toke	L
(Canada) **Supernaturalz**	**W**
(United States) **Killafornia Monsta**	**W**
(Japan) GunSmokeBreakers	L
(Finland) **Flow Mo**	**W**
West Japan Hero	L
(Japan) **Body Carnival**	**W**
(United States) 13.28.11	L
**Team Ukraine**	**W**
(United States) Hazardous Being	L
(Japan) **Foundnation**	**W**
(United States) Elusive Fenz	L
(Belarus) Lil Killaz	L
(United Nations) **Mighty Zulu Kingz**	**W**
(Germany) The Saxonz	L
(Japan) **Flooriorz**	**W**
(United States) **Squadron**	**W**
(Singapore) Lion City Bboys	L

Round of 16
(United States) **Concrete All Stars**	**W**
(Japan) Waseda Breakers	L
(United States) 808 Breakers	L
(United Nations) **Monsters Bboys**	**W**
(United States) Knuckleheads Cali	L
(Portugal) **Momentum**	**W**
(Netherlands) The Ruggeds	L
(Canada) **Supernaturalz**	**W**
(United States) **Killafornia Monsta**	**W**
(Finland) Flow Mo	L
(Japan) Body Carnival	L
**Team Ukraine**	**W**
(Japan) **Foundnation**	**W**
(United Nations) Mighty Zulu Kingz	L
(Japan) Flooriorz	L
(United States) **Squadron**	**W**

Quarter-finals
(United States) Concrete All Stars	L
(United Nations) **Monster Bboys**	**W**
(Portugal) **Momentum**	**W**
(Canada) Supernaturalz	L
(United States) Killafornia Monsta	L
**Team Ukraine**	**W**
(Japan) Foundnation	L
(United States) **Squadron**	**W**

Semi-finals
(United Nations) **Monster Bboys**	**W**
(Portugal) Momentum	L
Team Ukraine	L
(United States) **Squadron**	**W**

Final
(United Nations) **Monster Bboys**	**W**
(United States) Squadron	L

Winning Bboys: (United States) Moy, (United States) Zeku, (United States) Gravity, (United States) Jeremy, (United States) Tata (United States) Kareem (United States) Jeffro, (United States) Boxwon, (South Korea) Pocket, and (France) Benji.

== 2016 ==
Location: Los Angeles, California

Date: November 12, 2016

Individuals in bold won their respective battles.

Round of 16
(United States) **El Niño**	**W**
(Canada) Phil	L
(Venezuela) **Lil G**	W
(United States) Victor	L
(Poland) Kleju	L
(South Korea) **Pocket**	**W**
(United States) Thesis	L
(South Korea) **Dol**	**W**
(Japan) **Issei**	**W**
(Italy) Paco	L
(United States) Zeku	L
(United States) **Kareem**	**W**
(Ukraine) Robin	L
(United States) **Nasty Ray**	**W**
(United States) MN Joe	L
(United States) **Gravity**	**W**

Quarter-finals
(United States) **El Niño**	**W**
(Venezuela) Lil G	L
(South Korea) **Pocket**	**W**
(South Korea) Dol	L
(Japan) **Issei**	**W**
(United States) Kareem	L
(United States) **Nasty Ray**	**W**
(United States) Gravity	L

Semi-finals
(United States) **El Niño**	**W**
(South Korea) Pocket	L
(Japan) **Issei**	**W**
(United States) Nasty Ray	L

Final
(United States) **El Niño**	**W**
(Japan) Issei	L
Third place

== 2015 ==
Location: Los Angeles, California

Date: November 8, 2015

Individuals in bold won their respective battles.

Round of 16
(United States) **Victor**	**W**
(Ukraine) Robin	L
(United States) **El Niño**	**W**
(Poland) Yarko	L
(United States) **Moy**	**W**
(Japan) Issei	L
(United States) **Gravity**	**W**
(United Kingdom) Sunni	L
(Netherlands) Kid Colombia	L
(Poland) **Kleju**	**W**
(Brazil) Yuri Domingos	L
(Canada) **Fleau**	**W**
(United States) **Morris**	**W**
(Russia) Cheerito	L
(United States) **Lancer**	**W**
(Poland) Thomaz	L

Quarterfinals
(United States) **Victor**	**W**
(United States) El Niño	L
(United States) **Moy**	**W**
(United States) Gravity	L
(Poland) **Kleju**	**W**
(Canada) Flaeu	L
(United States) **Morris**	**W**
(United States) Lancer	L

Semifinals
(United States) **Victor**	**W**
(United States) Moy	L
(Poland) **Kleju**	**W**
(United States) Morris	L

Finals
(United States) **Victor**	**W**
(Poland) Kleju	L

After winning Freestyle Session, the second to last event of the World BBoy Series, Victor ( (United States) ) earned a double pass to Undisputed.

== 2014 ==
Starting in 2014, Freestyle Session began hosting solo or 1-on-1 b-boy battles. This was a result of partnering up with The World BBoy Series and Undisputed, an event to crown the solo world bboy champion. By winning Freestyle Session, El Niño ( (United States) ) earned the seventh bid to the Undisputed World BBoy Series at the end of the 2014 year.

Location: San Diego, California

Date: November 8, 2014

Individuals in bold won their respective battles.

Round of 16
(United States) **El Niño**	**W**
(Italy) Kaneki	L
(United States) Ronnie Ruen	L
(Netherlands) **Tawfiq**	**W**
(Poland) Kleju	L
(Canada) **Illz**	**W**
(United States) Nasty Ray	L
(Japan) **Nori**	**W**
(Netherlands) **Niek**	**W**
(United States) Wealthy	L
(United States) Bebo	L
(United States) **Moy**	**W**
(China) Lazy	L
(United States) **Morris**	**W**
(United States) Palmer	L
(United States) **Gravity**	**W**

Quarter-finals
(United States) **El Niño**	**W**
(Netherlands) Tawfiq	L
(Canada) **Illz**	**W**
(Japan) Nori	L
(Netherlands) **Niek**	**W**
(United States) Moy	L
(United States) Morris	L
(United States) **Gravity**	**W**

Semi-finals
(United States) **El Niño**	**W**
(Canada) Illz	L
(Netherlands) Niek	L
(United States) **Gravity**	**W**

Final
(United States) **El Niño**	**W**
(United States) Gravity	L
Third place
