= Outbreak Europe =

Annual breakdancing competition in Slovakia

- Status: active
- Genre: Breaking competition
- Begins: July 23, 2026
- Ends: July 26, 2026
- Frequency: Annually
- Venue: Europa Shopping Center, Ministry of Fun, Main Square, Urban Spot
- Location: Banská Bystrica
- Country: Slovakia
- Years active: 2010 - present
- Founders: David “B-Boy Mex One” Alvarado, Unique Styles Crew, The Bboy Spot Europe, The Legits
- Participants: 2000
- Attendance: 94 countries
- Major events: 2 vs 2 Breaking; 1 vs 1 Breaking; 1 vs 1 B-Girl; 1 vs 1 Footwork; 1 vs 1 Powermove; 1 vs 1 Toprock; 1 vs 1 Kid (16 yo and younger); Rep Your Country; Cypher Cat; The Legits Blast Concert & parties; Youth is the Future Camp

Outbreak Europe is an annual international breaking competition organized annually within THE LEGITS BLAST festival by a streetwear and video production company The Legits taking place in Banská Bystrica, Slovakia during last week of July. This 4-day event is notable for its uniqueness in featuring all 4 hip hop elements which are breaking, DJing, MCing and graffiti writing.

== Winners ==
Year	2vs2 Breaking	1vs1 Breaking	1vs1 B-Girl	Kid	Cypher King(s) & Queen(s) & Cats	Rep Your Country	1vs1 Footwork	1vs1 Power Move	1vs1 Toprock
2026	(France) Damani & Killian	(Ukraine) Raptor	(Japan) Hiyo	(China) Xueyu	(United States) Roxrite	Netherlands	(Romania) Beat - The Young Hustler	(Israel) Fly	(Argentina) Frozen
2025	(Japan) Shigekix & Ra1on	(Japan) Hiro10	(Lithuania) Nicka	(Taiwan) Saturn	(Brazil) Perninha	Japan	(France) Shynoh	(Taiwan) Saturn	(Palestine) Peaky Rock
2024	(Japan) Body Carnival YG	(Taiwan) Quake	(Lithuania) Nicka	(Poland) Littleman	(Ukraine) Ruffneck Attack	France	(Japan) Ayu	(Peru) Alexis	(Brazil) Fly Jan
2023	(Austria) Lil Zoo & (Ukraine) Kuzya	(China) Lithe-ing	(Lithuania) Nicka	(China) Jason	(France) Peaky Rock	Ukraine	(France) Chaubernard	(Venezuela) Lion	
2022	(Austria) Lil Zoo & (Canada) Phil Wizard	(France) Lagaet	(China) 671	(Italy) Danger	(Brazil) Allef	Ukraine	(Canada) Onton See		
2021	(Belgium) Robb & Jordi	(Russia) Nord Diamond	(Lithuania) Nicka	(Belarus) Point	(Ukraine) Tazzmanio & (Romania) Noris	Belgium			
2020*	(Australia) Willastr8 & (United States) Thesis	(Spain) JohnnyFox	(Japan) Ayumi	(Russia) Miracle	-	Russia			
2019	(United States) Stripes & (Canada) Vicious	(United States) Victor	(France) San Andrea	(Russia) Grom & Angry Boy	(France) From Down Town	Russia			
2018	(Ukraine) Intact & Den	(Russia) Cheerito	(Ukraine) Kate	(Ukraine) Raptor & (France) Malik	(France) From Down Town	France			
2017	(United States) Thesis & (Japan) Ayumi	(United States) Victor	(Ukraine) Kate	(Russia) Grom & Shasty Rock	(Ukraine) South Front	Ukraine			
2016	(Ukraine) Intact & Pluto	(Ukraine) Kuzya	(Poland) Paulina	(Japan) Shigekix	(United Kingdom) SMAC 19	France			
2015	(Netherlands) Menno & (United States) Roxrite	(United States) El Niño	(United States) Sunny	(Bulgaria) Untied	(Ukraine) Den	Poland			
2014	(Canada) Vicious & Fleau	(Poland) Kleju	(Poland) Paulina	(Ukraine) Nick	(Russia) Kosto	Poland			
2013	(Poland) Greku & Kleju	-	(Ukraine) Kate	-	(United States) Ladie One	Ukraine			
2012	(Russia) Vlad & (Lithuania) Rukus	-	(Japan) Eri	-	(Ukraine) Ruffneck Attack	Ukraine			
2011	(Brazil) Neguin & Blanka	-	(Spain) Movie One	-	(Ukraine) Slef	-			
2010	(Ukraine) Intact & Pluto	-	(Russia) Nadia	-	(Poland) Mefo	-			

== History ==
Outbreak Europe started in 2010 as the first official European qualifier for the Outbreak Hip Hop Festival - World Finals that was established by David “B-Boy Mex One” Alvarado of Unique Styles Crew in 2003 in Florida, USA. After the last edition of the Outbreak World Finals in Orlando, FL USA in 2013, the World Finals were moved indefinitely to Outbreak Europe, as the European qualifier became the eventual world championship event.

=== 2010 ===
First edition took place on July 1 – 4, 2010. Attendance at the event was 700 dancers and 200 visitors from 31 countries.

Judges:

- (United States) Roxrite (The Squadron Crew)
- (United States) Kid David (Renegades Crew)
- (United States) Keebz (Mind 180 Crew)

MCs:

- (Netherlands) Mario Bee
- (Slovakia) Lil Pablo

DJs:

- (United States) Lean Rock (The Squadron Crew)
- (United Kingdom) Renegade (Soul Mavericks Crew)
- (Slovenia) Woo-D (Horse Power Crew)
- (Slovakia) Piggo (StreetCom Crew)

Funk bands:

- (Slovakia) COMP&NEROS

=== 2011 ===
Second edition moved to a new place within the city and was held on June 30 - July 3, 2011. Attendance at the event increased to 1050 dancers and visitors from 36 countries.

Judges:

- (France) Lamine (Vegabonds Crew)
- (United States) El Niño (The Squadron Crew)
- (United States) Nasty Ray (The Squadron Crew)

MCs:

- (Netherlands) Mario Bee
- (Slovakia) Lil Pablo
- (United States) Mex One

DJs:

- (United States) Lean Rock (The Squadron Crew)
- (United Kingdom) Renegade (Soul Mavericks Crew)
- (Slovenia) Woo-D (Horse Power Crew)
- (Slovakia) Piggo (StreetCom Crew)

Funk bands:

- (Slovakia) COMP&NEROS

=== 2012 ===
Third volume of Outbreak Europe took place on July 27 – 29, 2012. It was a special edition because Outbreak World Finals moved from USA to Slovakia. For the first time, bboys and bgirls could win Outbreak World Finals title directly at the event in Banská Bystrica. This year also featured new unique world championship in category country vs country called Rep Your Country. Attendance was 1200 people and number of attending countries increased to 53 countries.

Judges:

- (United States) Ken Swift (7 Gems Crew)
- (Sweden) Freeze (Ghost Crew)
- (United States) Roxrite (The Squadron Crew)

MCs:

- (Netherlands) Mario Bee
- (Slovakia) Lil Pablo
- (United States) Mex One

DJs:

- (United States) Lean Rock (The Squadron Crew)
- (United Kingdom) Renegade (Soul Mavericks Crew)
- (Slovenia) Woo-D (Horse Power Crew)
- (Ukraine) Scream (South Bboys Front Crew)
- (Slovakia) Piggo (StreetCom Crew)

Funk bands:

- (Czech Republic) Champion Sound
- (Slovakia) COMP&NEROS

Graffiti writers:

- (United States) Spen One (Unique Styles Crew)
- (Slovakia) Point 3 Crew
- (Slovakia) Vaik (OSA Crew)
- (Slovakia) Ceil (OSA Crew)

=== 2013 ===
Fourth annual was held on July 26 – 28, 2013. After special World Finals edition in 2012, bboys and bgirls battled to qualify and get to Outbreak World Finals in USA again. Attendance increased to 1350 dancers and visitors from 61 countries.

Judges:

- (United States) Alien Ness (Zulu Kings Crew)
- (Finland) Focus (Flow Mo Crew)
- (United States) Jeskilz (Cypher Adikts Crew)

MCs:

- (Netherlands) Mario Bee
- (Slovakia) Lil Pablo
- (United States) Mex One

DJs:

- (United States) Lean Rock (The Squadron Crew)
- (United Kingdom) Renegade (Soul Mavericks Crew)
- (Ukraine) Scream (South Bboys Front Crew)
- (Russia) Smirnoff
- (United States) Ervin Arana (Cypher Adikts Crew)
- (Poland) Plash (SSS Crew)

Funk bands:

- (Czech Republic) Champion Sound
- (Slovakia) COMP&NEROS

Graffiti writers:

- (Slovakia) Point 3 Crew

=== 2014 ===
Fifth edition was a celebration of Outbreak Europe 5th anniversary and took place on July 25 – 27, 2014. It was an essential edition because European qualification became officially the World championship. This year was accompanied by new major event The Legits Blast Concert and Undisputed 1 vs 1 Battle qualification. The Legits Blast brought to Outbreak Europe live concert of legendary hip hop trio The Lords of the Underground from Newark, USA and concert of Slovak hip hop and funk band Krok Spet. Winner of Undisputed 1 vs 1 Battle advanced to Undisputed World Bboy Series championship. Attendees number reached 1750 people from 64 countries.

Judges:

- (United States) Poe One
- (South Korea) Hong 10
- (Brazil) Neguin

MCs:

- (Netherlands) Mario Bee
- (Slovakia) Lil Pablo
- (United States) Niko
- (Slovakia) Osťo

DJs:

- (United Kingdom) Renegade (Soul Mavericks Crew)
- (Ukraine) Scream (South Bboys Front Crew)
- (Poland) Plash (SSS Crew)
- (Russia) Smirnoff
- (United States) Fleg
- (United States) Felix
- (Spain) Skizo
- (Greece) Rawkuts

Concert:

- (United States) The Lords of the Underground
- (Slovakia) Krok Spet
- (Slovakia) Separ
- (Slovakia) Zverina
- (Czech Republic) Champion Sound
- (Poland) Flue

Graffiti writers:

- (Slovakia) Vaik (OSA Crew)
- (Slovakia) Ceil (OSA Crew)

=== 2015 ===
Sixth edition took place on July 24 – 26, 2015. The Legits Blast brought to Outbreak Europe live concert of another American legendary hip hop trio M.O.P., and famous slovak trio Kontrafakt. Attendees number reached 2700 people from 70 countries.

Judges:

- (United States) Kid David (Renegades Crew)
- (Netherlands) Menno (Def Dogz Crew)
- (Finland) Ata (Ghost Crew)
- (United States) Lego (Flipside Kingz Crew)
- (United States) Roxrite (The Squadron Crew)

MCs:

- (Netherlands) Mario Bee
- (Slovakia) Lil Pablo
- (Slovakia) Osťo

DJs:

- (United States) Lean Rock (The Squadron Crew)
- (United States) Fleg
- (United Kingdom) Renegade (Soul Mavericks Crew)
- (Ukraine) Scream (South Bboys Front Crew)
- (Poland) Plash (SSS Crew)
- (Russia) Smirnoff
- (United States) Felix

Concert:

- (United States) M.O.P.
- (Slovakia) Kontrafakt
- (Slovakia) Krok Spet
- (Slovakia) Špeker a Boco
- (Poland) Flue

Graffiti writers:

- (Slovakia) Vaik (OSA Crew)
- (Slovakia) Ceil (OSA Crew)

=== 2016 ===
Seventh edition took place on July 29 – 31, 2016. The Legits Blast brought to Outbreak Europe live concert of The Beatnuts, and famous slovak Hip Hop artists Majk Spirit, H16, Moja Reč, Strapo, Boy Wonder and others. Attendees number reached 3200 people from 71 countries. In 2016 334 bboys, 114 bgirls and 225 2on2 participants entered the competition, making Outbreak Europe the largest bboy event in the world.

Judges:

- (United States) Abstrak
- (United States) Nasty Ray
- (Finland) Bgirl AT
- (Canada) Dyzee
- (United States) Lil John

MCs:

- (Netherlands) Mario Bee
- (Slovakia) Lil Pablo
- (Slovakia) Osťo

DJs:

- (United States) Lean Rock (The Squadron Crew)
- (United States) Fleg
- (United States) Ervin Arana
- (United Kingdom) Renegade (Soul Mavericks Crew)
- (Ukraine) Scream (South Bboys Front Crew)
- (Poland) Plash (SSS Crew)
- (Russia) Smirnoff
- (United States) Felix
- (Slovakia) Shimo

Concert:

- (United States) The Beatnuts
- (United States) Sol
- (Slovakia) Majk Spirit + H16
- (Slovakia) Strapo
- (Slovakia) Moja Reč
- (Slovakia) Boy Wonder
- (Slovakia) Krok Spet
- (Slovakia) Špeker a Boco
- (Poland) Flue

Graffiti writers:

- (Slovakia) Vaik (OSA Crew)
- (Slovakia) Ceil (OSA Crew)
- (Slovakia) Ewil One (Point 3 Crew)

=== 2017 ===
Eight edition took place on July 28 – 30, 2017.

Judges:

- (United States) Poe One
- (Russia) Yan
- (United States) Casper
- (United States) Reveal
- (United Kingdom) Renegade

MCs:

- (United States) Ivan Urban Action Figure
- (Slovakia) Lil Pablo
- (Slovakia) Osťo

DJs:

- (United States) Lean Rock (The Squadron Crew)
- (United States) Fleg
- (United States) Ervin Arana
- (United Kingdom) Renegade (Soul Mavericks Crew)
- (Ukraine) Scream (South Bboys Front Crew)
- (Poland) Plash (SSS Crew)
- (Russia) Smirnoff

Concert:

- (United States) Onyx
- (United States) R.A. The Rugged Man
- (Slovakia) Rytmus + Opostaris Live Band
- (Czech Republic) PSH
- (Slovakia) Vec + Tono S. + Škrupo + Joe Trendy
- (Slovakia) Supa & Jožis Engerer
- (Poland) Flue Funk Band
- (Slovakia) PJ & Funkdat

Graffiti writers:

- (Slovakia) Vaik (OSA Crew)
- (Slovakia) Ceil (OSA Crew)
- (Slovakia) Ewil One (Point 3 Crew)

=== 2018 ===
9th edition took place on July 27 – 29, 2018.

Judges:

- (United States) Float
- (South Korea) Wing
- (United States) Poe One
- (United States) Felix
- (Finland) Hatsolo
- (United Kingdom) Renegade

MCs:

- (United States) Ivan Urban Action Figure
- (Slovakia) Lil Pablo
- (Portugal) Max
- (Slovakia) Johnny Mečoch

DJs:

- (United States) Lean Rock (The Squadron Crew)
- (United States) Fleg
- (United States) Ervin Arana
- (United Kingdom) Renegade (Soul Mavericks Crew)
- (Ukraine) Scream (South Bboys Front Crew)
- (Poland) Plash (SSS Crew)
- (Russia) Smirnoff
- (United States) Felix
- (Slovakia) BJ Piggo

Concert:

- (United States) Das Efx
- (Slovakia) Strapo & DJ Spinhandz
- (Slovakia) Nerieš
- (Slovakia) Majself
- (Slovakia) PJ & Funkdat

Graffiti writers:

- (Slovakia) Vaik (OSA Crew)
- (Slovakia) Ceil (OSA Crew)
- (Slovakia) Ewil One (Point 3 Crew)

== Outbreak Europe ==
=== 2014 ===
Individuals in bold won their respective battles.

Round of 16
(Poland) **Kleju**	**W**
(France) Tonio	L
(Brazil) **Tyson**	**W**
(United States) Tony Tbags	L
(Russia) **Kosto**	**W**
(Ukraine) Kapon	L
(Russia) **Alkolil**	**W**
(United Kingdom) Spin	L
(Poland) **Greku**	**W**
(Ukraine) Chereb	L
(Kazakhstan) **Killa Kolya**	**W**
(Ukraine) Sapa	L
(Slovakia) **Twister**	**W**
(Russia) Milky Rock	L
(Ukraine) **Kuzya**	**W**
(Mexico) Freeman	L

Quarter-finals
(Poland) **Kleju**	**W**
(Brazil) Tyson	L
(Russia) **Kosto**	**W**
(Russia) Alkolil	L
(Poland) Greku	L
(Kazakhstan) **Killa Kolya**	**W**
(Slovakia) Twister	L
(Ukraine) **Kuzya**	**W**

Semi-finals
(Poland) **Kleju**	**W**
(Russia) Kosto	L
(Kazakhstan) **Killa Kolya**	**W**
(Ukraine) Kuzya	L

Final
(Poland) **Kleju**	**W**
(Kazakhstan) Killa Kolya	L
Third place

=== 2015 ===
Individuals in bold won their respective battles.

Round of 16
(United States) **El Niño**	**W**
(Spain) Husky Husk	L
(Brazil) **Klesio**	**W**
(Italy) Kanedsi	L
(Slovakia) **Twister**	**W**
(Brazil) Yuri Dominggos	L
(Brazil) **Perna**	**W**
(Russia) Vint	L
(United States) **Fantum**	**W**
(Greece) Onel	L
(Poland) **Kleju**	**W**
(Israel) Tricky	L
(United Kingdom) **LB**	**W**
(Mexico) Hill	L
(Israel) **Hulk**	**W**
(Germany) Conni	L

Quarter-finals
(United States) **El Niño**	**W**
(Brazil) Klesio	L
(Slovakia) **Twister**	**W**
(Brazil) Perna	L
(United States) **Fantum**	**W**
(Poland) Kleju	L
(United Kingdom) **LB**	**W**
(Israel) Hulk	L

Semi-finals
(United States) **El Niño**	**W**
(Slovakia) Twister	L
(United States) **Fantum**	**W**
(United Kingdom) LB	L

Final
(United States) **El Niño**	**W**
(United States) Fantum	L
Third place

=== 2016 ===
Individuals in bold won their respective battles.

Round of 16
(Ukraine) **Kuzya**	**W**
(Japan) Shigekix	L
(Poland) **Kleju**	**W**
(Venezuela) Mini Joe	L
(Poland) **Thomaz**	**W**
(Brazil) Klesio	L
(Israel) **Hulk**	**W**
(Slovakia) Twister	L
(United Kingdom) **Sunni**	**W**
(Ukraine) Sapa	L
(South Korea) **Milhouse**	**W**
(Poland) Yarko	L
(Netherlands) **Niek**	**W**
(Belgium) T-Rock	L
(Venezuela) **Lil G**	**W**
(Germany) Noindex	L

Quarter-finals
(Ukraine) **Kuzya**	**W**
(Poland) Kleju	L
(Poland) **Thomaz**	**W**
(Israel) Hulk	L
(United Kingdom) **Sunni**	**W**
(South Korea) Milhouse	L
(Netherlands) **Niek**	**W**
(Venezuela) Lil G	L

Semi-finals
(Ukraine) **Kuzya**	**W**
(Poland) Thomaz	L
(United Kingdom) **Sunni**	**W**
(Netherlands) Niek	L

Final
(Ukraine) **Kuzya**	**W**
(United Kingdom) Sunni	L
Third place

=== 2017 ===
Individuals in bold won their respective battles.

Round of 16
(United States) **Victor**	**W**
(Poland) Kido	L
(Slovakia) **Twister**	**W**
(Belgium) T-Rock	L
(Poland) **Thomaz**	**W**
(Japan) Shigekix	L
(Morocco) **The Wolfer**	**W**
(United Kingdom) Spin	L
(Ukraine) **Uzee Rock**	**W**
(United States) Roxrite	L
(Ukraine) **Lussy Sky**	**W**
(Belgium) Admiracles	L
(Ukraine) **Kuzya**	**W**
(Russia) Snake	L
(United Kingdom) **LB**	**W**
(Russia) Grin	L

Quarter-finals
(United States) **Victor**	**W**
(Slovakia) Twister	L
(Poland) **Thomaz**	**W**
(Morocco) The Wolfer	L
(Ukraine) **Uzee Rock**	**W**
(Ukraine) Lussy Sky	L
(Ukraine) **Kuzya**	**W**
(United Kingdom) LB	L

Semi-finals
(United States) **Victor**	**W**
(Poland) Thomaz	L
(Ukraine) **Uzee Rock**	**W**
(Ukraine) Kuzya	L

Final
(United States) **Victor**	**W**
(Ukraine) Uzee Rock	L
Third place

=== 2018 ===
Individuals in bold won their respective battles. Undisputed #39.

Round of 16
(United Kingdom) **Kid Karam**	**W**
(Russia) Gun	L
(Japan) **Ayumi**	**W**
(Russia) Beetle	L
(France) **Dany**	**W**
(Russia) Nord Diamond	L
(Ukraine) **Kuzya**	**W**
(France) Kae	L
(United Kingdom) **LB**	**W**
(United Kingdom) Sheku	L
(Canada) **Illz**	**W**
(Venezuela) Lil G	L
(Canada) **Phil Wizzard**	**W**
(Russia) Gieras	L
(Russia) **Cheerito**	**W**
(Venezuela) Mini Joe	L

Quarter-finals
(United Kingdom) **Kid Karam**	**W**
(Japan) Ayumi	L
(Ukraine) **Kuzya**	**W**
(France) Dany	L
(Canada) **Illz**	**W**
(United Kingdom) LB	L
(Russia) **Cheerito**	**W**
(Canada) Phill Wizard	L

Semi-finals
(Ukraine) **Kuzya**	**W**
(United Kingdom) Kid Karam	L
(Russia) **Cheerito**	**W**
(Canada) Illz	L

Final
(Russia) **Cheerito**	**W**
(Ukraine) Kuzya	L
Third place

=== 2023 ===
==== B-Boys ====
Round of 32
(Latvia) Prorock^{1}	1
(Venezuela) **Lion**^{2}	**2**
(Chile) **Matita**^{1}	**2**
(United States) Bowzee^{2}	1
(United States) **Nelzwhon**^{1}	**3**
(Italy) Bad Matty^{2}	0
(Spain) Lil Dani^{1}	0
(China) **Lithe-ing**^{2}	**3**
(Venezuela) **Mighty Jake**^{2}	**3**
(China) X-Rain^{1}	0
(Belgium) Cis^{1}	0
(France) **Nasty**^{2}	**3**
(France) Shaymin^{2}	0
(Belgium) **Mighty Jimm**^{1}	**3**
(Ukraine) **Raptor**^{1}	**2**
(Spain) JohnnyFox^{2}	1
(South Korea) **Millie**^{1}	**3**
(Venezuela) Lil G^{2}	0
(China) **Monkey Z**^{2}	**3**
(Belgium) XL^{1}	0
(France) Link le Neil^{2}	0
(Japan) **Isaki**^{1}	**3**
(Brazil) **Samuka**^{1}	**3**
(Norway) Daniel^{2}	0
(Poland) **Gieras**^{2}	**2**
(Italy) Kent^{1}	1
(Venezuela) **Mini Joe**^{2}	**2**
(Portugal) Found Kid^{1}	1
(United Kingdom) **Sheku**^{1}	**2**
(Belgium) Tiro^{2}	1
(Colombia) Ricky Rulez^{2}	0
(Italy) **Amaro**^{1}	**3**

Round of 16
(Venezuela) Lion^{1}	**3**|2|1
(Chile) **Matita**^{2}	2|**3**|**4**
(United States) Nelzwhon^{1}	1|2
(China) **Lithe-ing**^{2}	**4**|**3**
(Venezuela) Mighty Jake^{1}	2|0
(France) **Nasty**^{2}	**3**|**5**
(Belgium) **Mighty Jimm**^{1}	**3**|**5**
(Ukraine) Raptor^{2}	2|0
(South Korea) Millie^{1}	0|2
(China) **Monkey Z**^{2}	**5**|**3**
(Japan) Isaki^{2}	**3**|2|0
(Brazil) **Samuka**^{1}	2|**3**|**5**
(Poland) Gieras^{2}	0*|0
(Venezuela) **Mini Joe**^{1}	**4***|**5**
(United Kingdom) **Sheku**^{1}	**4**|**4**
(Italy) Amaro^{2}	1|1

Quarter-finals
(Chile) Matita^{1}	2|0
(China) **Lithe-ing**^{2}	**3**|**5**
(France) Nasty^{2}	**3**|1|0
(Belgium) **Mighty Jimm**^{1}	2|**4**|**5**
(China) Monkey Z^{2}	1|**3**|1
(Brazil) **Samuka**^{1}	**4**|2|**4**
(Venezuela) **Mini Joe**^{2}	**4**|**5**
(United Kingdom) Sheku^{1}	1|0

Semi-finals
(China) **Lithe-ing**^{2}	**4**|**3**
(Belgium) Mighty Jimm^{1}	1|2
(Brazil) **Samuka**^{2}	0|**5**|**5**
(Venezuela) Mini Joe^{1}	**5**|0|0

Final
(China) **Lithe-ing**^{2}	**4**|**5**|**4**
(Brazil) Samuka^{1}	1|0|1

- ^{1} means they went first in the battle, ^{2} means they went second in the battle
- Kid David was unable to submit his vote for round 1 of Gieras vs Mini Joe due to technical difficulties.

==== B-Girls ====
Round of 32
(Poland) Mery Berry^{1}	0
(Poland) **Paulina**^{2}	**3**
(Estonia) Karina^{2}	1
(France) **Syssy**^{1}	**2**
(Germany) **Jilou**^{1}	**3**
(France) Carlota^{2}	0
(Portugal) **Vanessa**^{1}	**3**
(Japan) Narumi^{2}	0
(France) Mia^{2}	1
(Ukraine) **Killa Kim**^{1}	**2**
(France) Chris^{2}	1
(Canada) **Emmaaaa**^{1}	**2**
(Spain) Furia^{1}	0
(United States) **Logistx**^{2}	**3**
(Canada) **Konatsu**^{2}	**2**
(Italy) Elettra^{1}	1
(France) O.D.D^{1}	0
(China) **Plus One**^{2}	**3**
(Germany) Alicia^{2}	1
(Ecuador) **Isis**^{1}	**2**
(China) Ziyan^{1}	1
(France) **Sarah Bee**^{2}	**2**
(China) **Yingzi**^{2}	**3**
(Bulgaria) Firebird^{1}	0
(Italy) **Alessandrina**^{1}	**3**
(Colombia) Luma^{2}	0
(Czech Republic) Miimo^{2}	1
(Spain) **Bpanther**^{1}	**2**
(Poland) Julianna^{1}	0
(Belgium) **Camine**^{2}	**3**
(Italy) Agne^{2}	0
(Lithuania) **Nicka**^{1}	**3**

Round of 16
(Poland) Paulina^{1}	0|2
(France) **Syssy**^{2}	**5**|**3**
(Germany) Jilou^{1}	1|**4**|1
(Portugal) **Vanessa**^{2}	**4**|1|**4**
(Ukraine) Killa Kim^{1}	2|0
(Canada) **Emmaaaa**^{2}	**3**|**5**
(United States) **Logistx**^{1}	0|**3**|**4**
(Canada) Konatsu^{2}	**5**|2|1
(China) Plus One^{1}	1|1
(Ecuador) **Isis**^{2}	**4**|**4**
(France) Sarah Bee^{2}	0|2
(China) **Yingzi**^{1}	**5**|**3**
(Italy) **Alessandrina**^{2}	**4**|**5**
(Spain) Bpanther^{1}	1|0
(Belgium) Camine^{1}	0|0
(Lithuania) **Nicka**^{2}	**5**|**5**

Quarter-finals
(France) **Syssy**^{1}	**5**|**3**
(Portugal) Vanessa^{2}	0|2
(Canada) **Emmaaaa**^{1}	0|**5**|**3**
(United States) Logistx^{2}	**5**|0|2
(Ecuador) Isis^{1}	1|1
(China) **Yingzi**^{2}	**4**|**4**
(Italy) Alessandrina^{2}	**3**|0|0
(Lithuania) **Nicka**^{1}	2|**5**|**5**

Semi-finals
(France) **Syssy**^{1}	2|**5**|**4**
(Canada) Emmaaaa^{2}	**3**|0|1
(China) Yingzi^{2}	**3**|1|1
(Lithuania) **Nicka**^{1}	2|**4**|**4**

Final
(France) Syssy^{2}	1|1|2
(Lithuania) **Nicka**^{1}	**4**|**4**|**3**

- ^{1} means they went first in the battle, ^{2} means they went second in the battle

=== 2024 ===
==== B-Boys ====
Round of 32
(United Kingdom) Sheku^{1}	1
(Brazil) **Allef~**^{2}	**4**
(Romania) Beat the YH^{1}	0
(Canada) **Illz**^{2}	**5**
(Italy) Amaro^{1}	1
(France) **Damani**^{2}	**4**
(France) Moons^{2}	1
(Poland) **Madmax**^{1}	**4**
(France) Yann^{1}	1
(Ukraine) **Raptor**^{2}	**4**
(Mexico) Niñonino^{1}	0
(France) **Killian**^{2}	**5**
(Venezuela) **Alvin**^{1}	**5**
(Spain) Johnny Fox^{2}	0
(South Korea) **FE**^{1}	**5**
(Venezuela) Sheka^{2}	0
(South Korea) Jazzbear^{1}	0
(Venezuela) **Lion**^{2}	**5**
(Belgium) **Djibril**^{2}	**3**
(Brazil) Bart^{1}	2
(United States) **Mace**^{1}	**5**
(Ukraine) Play Rock^{2}	0
**Alkolil**^{1}	**5**
(Brazil) Gaspar7^{2}	0
(Japan) **Toa**^{1}	**3**
(France) Shaymin^{2}	2
(United States) D-tex^{2}	0
(Taiwan) **Quake**^{1}	**5**
(Brazil) Luan San^{1}	1
(South Korea) **Millie**^{2}	**4**
(France) **Marlone**^{1}	**5**
(Belgium) Lucky^{2}	0

Round of 16
(Brazil) **Allef~**^{2}	**6**|1|**5**
(Canada) Illz^{1}	1|**6**|2
(France) Damani^{1}	1|3
(Poland) **Madmax**^{2}	**6**|**4**
(Ukraine) **Raptor**^{1}	**7**|**6**
(France) Killian^{2}	0|1
(Venezuela) Alvin^{1}	**4**|0|0
(South Korea) **FE**^{2}	3|**7**|**7**
(Venezuela) Lion^{1}	**4**|0|0
(Belgium) **Djibril**^{2}	3|**7**|**7**
(Ukraine) Play Rock^{1}	**7**|1|1
**Alkolil**^{2}	0|**6**|**6**
(Japan) Toa^{2}	0|0
(Taiwan) **Quake**^{1}	**7**|**7**
(South Korea) Millie^{1}	2|0
(France) **Marlone**^{2}	**5**|**7**

Quarter-finals
(Brazil) Allef~^{2}	3|0
(Poland) **Madmax**^{1}	**4**|**7**
(Ukraine) **Raptor**^{2}	2|**5**|**7**
(South Korea) FE^{1}	**5**|2|0
(Belgium) Djibril^{2}	0|1
**Alkolil**^{1}	**7**|**6**
(Taiwan) **Quake**^{1}	**7**|**7**
(France) Marlone^{2}	0'|0

Semi-finals
(Poland) Madmax^{1}	**5**|1|2
(Ukraine) **Raptor**^{2}	2|**6**|**5**
Alkolil^{2}	0|3
(Taiwan) **Quake**^{1}	**7**|**4**

Final
(Ukraine) Raptor^{2}	1|**6**|1
(Taiwan) **Quake**^{1}	**6**|1|**6**

Mace got injured, so Play Rock got brought back into the competition.

- ^{1} means they went first in the battle, ^{2} means they went second in the battle

==== B-Girls ====
Round of 32
(France) **Mia**^{1}	**5**
(Poland) EmKa^{2}	0
(United States) La Vix^{1}	1
(France) **San Andrea**^{2}	**4**
(Italy) **Agne**^{2}	**3**
(Colombia) Celestia^{1}	2
(Netherlands) **India**^{1}	**5**
(Japan) NaNaKa^{2}	0
(Ukraine) **Riva**^{1}	**4**
(France) Ninah^{2}	1
(Italy) **Alessandrina**^{1}	**5**
(Germany) Sona^{2}	0
(France) Campanita^{1}	0
(Brazil) **Maia**^{2}	**5**
(Poland) Pralka^{2}	0
(France) **Syssy**^{1}	**5**
(Romania) **Carla**^{2}	**5**
(Argentina) Anita^{1}	0
(France) **Kimie**^{2}	**4**
(Taiwan) Jia Li^{1}	1
(Germany) **Jilou**^{1}	**4**
(Italy) Cami^{2}	1
(Brazil) Pekena^{1}	0
(Japan) **Ayane**^{2}	**5**
(Japan) ERi^{1}	0
**(Canada) Emmaaaa**^{2}	**5**
(Brazil) Matea^{1}	0
(Mexico) **Swami**^{2}	**5**
(Germany) **Pauline**^{1}	**4**
(France) Alyssa^{2}	1
(Lithuania) **Nicka**^{1}	**5**
(Germany) Alicia^{2}	0

Round of 16
(France) Mia^{2}	**4**|1|0
(France) **San Andrea**^{1}	3|**6**|**7**
(Italy) Agne	0|0
(Netherlands) **India**	**7**|**7**
(Ukraine) Riva^{1}	3|3
(Italy) **Alessandrina**^{2}	**4**|**4**
(Brazil) Maia^{1}	0|1
(France) **Syssy**^{2}	**7**|**6**
(Romania) Carla^{1}	1|3
(France) **Kimie**^{2}	**6**|**4**
(Germany) Jilou^{1}	2|0
(Japan) **Ayane**^{2}	**5**|**7**
(Canada) Emaaaa^{1}	**6**|1|2
(Mexico) **Swami**^{2}	1|**6**|**5**
(Germany) Pauline^{1}	0|0
(Lithuania) **Nicka**^{2}	**7**|**7**

Quarter-finals
(France) San Andrea^{2}	0|1
(Netherlands) **India**^{1}	**7**|**6**
(Italy) Alessandrina^{1}	0|2
(France) **Syssy**^{2}	**7**|**5**
(France) **Kimie**^{2}	3|**7**|**7**
(Japan) Ayane^{1}	**4**|0|0
(Mexico) Swami^{2}	0|0
(Lithuania) **Nicka**^{1}	**7**|**7**

Semi-finals
(Netherlands) **India**^{1}	**7**|0|**4**
(France) Syssy^{2}	0|**7**|3
(France) Kimie^{2}	0|0
(Lithuania) **Nicka**^{1}	**7**|**7**

Final
(Netherlands) India^{2}	2|1|1
(Lithuania) **Nicka**^{1}	**5**|**6**|**6**

- ^{1} means they went first in the battle, ^{2} means they went second in the battle

=== 2025 ===
==== B-Boys ====
Round of 32
(Japan) OUKI^{1}	1
(Brazil) **Allef~**^{2}	**4**
(United States) **Mace**^{2}	**4**
(Taiwan) Jasper^{1}	1
Beetle^{1}	2
(Japan) **ISAKI**^{2}	**3**
**ZipRock**^{2}	**4**
(Japan) Ryoga^{1}	1
(France) **Killian**^{1}	**3**
(Japan) Nicolas^{2}	2
(United Kingdom) Sunni^{1}	2
**Cyga**^{2}	**3**
(Ukraine) **Tabrin**^{1}	**4**
(Germany) Shiny^{2}	1
(Greece) Onel^{2}	2
(Taiwan) **Quake**^{1}	**3**
(Venezuela) Lion^{2}	0
(Ukraine) **Gimnast**^{1}	**5**
(Spain) **Johnny Fox**^{1}	**5**
(Sweden) Andy^{2}	0
(Colombia) **Jeian**^{1}	**4**
(Belgium) Djibril^{2}	1
(Japan) **Hiro10**^{1}	**5**
(South Korea) Millie Mil^{2}	0
**Grom**^{1}	**5**
(Belgium) Emilio^{2}	0
(France) Louis^{2}	0
(Slovenia) **Twister**^{1}	**5**
(Italy) **Amaro**^{1}	**3**
(France) Ceebri^{2}	2
(Japan) Yu-Ki^{2}	0
(France) **Marlone**^{1}	**5**

Round of 16
(Brazil) Allef~^{1}	**5**|1|3
(United States) **Mace**^{2}	2|**6**|**4**
(Japan) ISAKI^{2}	**6**|2|1
**ZipRock**^{1}	1|**5**|**6**
(France) **Killian**^{1}	**7**|3|**7**
Cyga^{2}	0|**4**|0
(Ukraine) Tabrin^{1}	1|**6**|3
(Taiwan) **Quake**^{2}	**6**|1|**4**
(Ukraine) **Gimnast**^{1}	**4**|**5**
(Spain) Johnny Fox^{2}	3|2
(Belgium) Jeian^{1}	0|0
(Japan) **Hiro10**^{2}	**7**|**7**
**Grom**^{2}	**4**|**7**
(Slovakia) Twister^{1}	3|0
(Italy) Amaro^{2}	1|2
(France) **Marlone**^{1}	**6**|**5**

Quarter-finals
(United States) Mace^{2}	1|1
**ZipRock**^{1}	**6**|**6**
(France) Killian^{2}	3|3
(Taiwan) **Quake**^{1}	**4**|**4**
(Ukraine) Gimnast^{1}	1|0
(Japan) **Hiro10**^{2}	**6**|**7**
**Grom**^{2}	**5**|**6**
(France) Marlone^{1}	2|1

Semi-finals
**ZipRock**^{1}	**4**|**5**
(Taiwan) Quake^{2}	3|2
(Japan) **Hiro10**^{1}	**4**|1|**4**
Grom^{2}	3|**6**|3

Final
ZipRock^{1}	0|**7**|3
(Japan) **Hiro10**^{2}	**7**|0|**4**

- ^{1} means they went first in the battle, ^{2} means they went second in the battle

==== B-Girls ====
Round of 32
(South Korea) **Starry**^{1}	**3**
(Japan) Ram^{2}	2
(France) **Kimie**^{2}	**5**
(Poland) EmKa^{1}	0
(Italy) Alesandrina^{2}	0
(France) **Syssy**^{1}	**5**
(Italy) **Spidergirl**^{1}	**4**
(France) Karla^{2}	1
(Ukraine) **Stefani**^{1}	**5**
Kristina^{2}	0
Posya Rock^{2}	2
**Tata**^{1}	**3**
**Nika**^{2}	**4**
(Italy) Chimpa^{1}	1
(Japan) **Ayane**^{2}	**4**
(Belgium) Badli^{1}	1
Kotya^{1}	1
(France) **Chris**^{2}	**4**
(Japan) **Yuina**^{1}	**5**
(Ukraine) Sonya^{2}	0
(United States) La Vix^{2}	2
(Mexico) **Swami**^{1}	**3**
(Ukraine) **Kate**^{1}	**5**
(Latvia) Izanami^{2}	0
(China) **Hami**^{1}	**3**
(Poland) Mery Berry^{2}	2
(Romania) Carla^{2}	1
(Japan) **Yuika**^{1}	**4**
(France) Mia^{2}	2
(Turkey) **Jazzy**^{1}	**3**
Masha Uragan^{1}	0
(Lithuania) **Nicka**^{2}	**5**

Round of 16
(South Korea) Starry^{2}	0|2
(France) **Kimie**^{1}	**7**|**5**
(France) **Syssy**^{2}	**7**|**6**
(Italy) Spidergirl^{1}	0|1
(Ukraine) **Stefani**^{1}	**4**|1|**4**
Tata^{2}	3|**6**|3
Nika^{1}	2|3
(Japan) **Ayane**^{2}	**5**|**4**
(France) Chris^{2}	2|**6**|1
(Japan) **Yuina**^{1}	**5**|1|**6**
(Mexico) Swami^{2}	0|2
(Ukraine) **Kate**^{1}	**7**|**5**
(China) **Hami**^{1}	**5**|1|**4**
(Japan) Yuika^{2}	2|**6**|3
(Turkey) Jazzy^{1}	0|0
(Lithuania) **Nicka**^{2}	**7**|**7**

Quarter-finals
(France) **Kimie**^{1}	**5**|0|**4**
(France) Syssy^{2}	2|**7**|3
(Ukraine) Stefani^{1}	1|2
(Japan) **Ayane**^{2}	**6**|**5**
(Japan) Yuina^{2}	1|**5**|1
(Ukraine) **Kate**^{1}	**6**|2|**6**
(China) Hami^{2}	2|0
(Lithuania) **Nicka**^{1}	**5**|**7**

Semi-finals
(France) **Kimie**^{1}	**5**|**7**
(Japan) Ayane^{2}	2|0
(Ukraine) Kate^{2}	1|0
(Lithuania) **Nicka**^{1}	**6**|**7**

Final
(France) Kimie^{1}	3|2|2
(Lithuania) **Nicka**^{2}	**4**|**5**|**5**

- ^{1} means they went first in the battle, ^{2} means they went second in the battle

=== 2026 ===
==== B-Boys ====
Round of 32
(China) **Z**^{2}	**4**
(Italy) Mowgly^{1}	1
(Netherlands) Federico^{2}	0
(Belgium) **Djibril**^{1}	**5**
(Japan) **So-Ta**^{1}	**5**
(United Kingdom) Bez^{2}	0
(Venezuela) **Mini Joe**^{1}	**5**
(Romania) Armand The Young Hustler^{2}	0
(Kazakhstan) **Dias**^{2}	**4**
(Poland) Nike1do^{1}	1
(Belgium) **Cis**^{2}	**3**
(Venezuela) Mighty Jake^{1}	2
(Kazakhstan) **Kalmius**^{1}	**3**
(Poland) Monster^{2}	2
(Poland) **Jee Ess**^{2}	**5**
(United States) Gravity^{1}	0
(Japan) Jun^{1}	1
(Italy) **Blaze**^{2}	**4**
(Ukraine) **Raptor**^{2}	**4**
(Norway) RythymBox^{1}	1
(Taiwan) Saturn^{2}	1
(Australia) **J-Attack**^{1}	**4**
(Denmark) Seier^{2}	0
(China) **Davy**^{1}	**5**
(France) R-One^{2}	0
(Italy) **Pesto**^{1}	**5**
**Nord Diamond**^{1}	**5**
(China) Irving^{2}	0
(Brazil) Mauricio^{2}	1
**Miracle**^{1}	**4**
(Belgium) **Fabab**^{2}	**4**
(Netherlands) CYZ^{1}	1

Round of 16
(China) Z^{1}	1|0
(Belgium) **Djibril**^{2}	**6**|**7**
(Japan) **So-Ta**^{2}	**5**|**4**
(Venezuela) Mini Joe^{1}	2|3
(Kazakhstan) **Dias**^{2}	**6**|**7**
(Belgium) Cis^{1}	1|0
(Kazakhstan) Kalmius^{1}	**6**|1|3
(Poland) **Jee Ess**^{2}	1|**6**|**4**
(Italy) Blaze^{1}	2|2
(Ukraine) **Raptor**^{2}	**5**|**5**
(Australia) **J-Attack**^{2}	**4**|**6**
(China) Davy^{1}	3|1
(Italy) Pesto^{1}	1|0
**Nord Diamond**^{2}	**6**|**7**
**Miracle**^{1}	**6**|**5**
(Belgium) Fabab^{2}	1|2

Quarter-finals
(Belgium) Djibril^{2}	**7**|3|2
(Japan) **So-Ta**^{1}	0|**4**|**5**
(Kazakhstan) **Dias**^{2}	**7**|**4**
(Poland) Jee Ess^{1}	0|3
(Ukraine) **Raptor**^{2}	**7**|**6**
(Australia) J-Attack^{1}	0|1
**Nord Diamond**^{1}	**5**|3|**6**
Miracle^{2}	2|**4**|1

Semi-finals
(Japan) So-Ta^{1}	0|1
(Kazakhstan) **Dias**^{2}	**7**|**6**
(Ukraine) **Raptor**^{2}	**7**|**7**
Nord Diamond^{1}	0|0

Final
(Kazakhstan) Dias^{2}	1|3|**7**
(Ukraine) **Raptor**^{1}	**6**|**4**|0

- ^{1} means they went first in the battle, ^{2} means they went second in the battle

Judge Votes
Battle	(Austria) The Wolfer	(United States) Poe One	(United States) Machine	(France) San Andrea	(Canada) Vicious	(Japan) Yasmin	(South Korea) Born	(Ukraine) Kuzya	Total Score
(China) **Z** vs (Italy) Mowgly	(Italy) Mowgly	(China) **Z**	(China) **Z**	(China) **Z**	(China) **Z**	N/A	N/A	N/A	**4**-1
(Netherlands) Federico vs **(Belgium) Djibril**	**(Belgium) Djibril**	**(Belgium) Djibril**	**(Belgium) Djibril**	**(Belgium) Djibril**	**(Belgium) Djibril**	N/A	N/A	N/A	0-**5**
**(Japan) So-Ta** vs **(United Kingdom)** Bez	**(Japan) So-Ta**	**(Japan) So-Ta**	**(Japan) So-Ta**	**(Japan) So-Ta**	**(Japan) So-Ta**	N/A	N/A	N/A	**5**-0
**(Venezuela) Mini Joe** vs **(Romania)** Armand The Young Hustler	**(Venezuela) Mini Joe**	**(Venezuela) Mini Joe**	**(Venezuela) Mini Joe**	**(Venezuela) Mini Joe**	**(Venezuela) Mini Joe**	N/A	N/A	N/A	**5**-0
**(Kazakhstan) Dias** vs **(Poland)** Nike1do	**(Kazakhstan) Dias**	**(Kazakhstan) Dias**	**(Poland)** Nike1do	**(Kazakhstan) Dias**	**(Kazakhstan) Dias**	N/A	N/A	N/A	**4**-1
**(Belgium) Cis** vs **(Venezuela)** Mighty Jake	**(Belgium) Cis**	**(Belgium) Cis**	**(Venezuela)** Mighty Jake	**(Belgium) Cis**	**(Venezuela)** Mighty Jake	N/A	N/A	N/A	**3**-2
**(Kazakhstan) Kalmius** vs **(Poland)** Monster	**(Kazakhstan) Kalmius**	**(Kazakhstan) Kalmius**	**(Poland)** Monster	**(Poland)** Monster	**(Kazakhstan) Kalmius**	N/A	N/A	N/A	**3**-2
**(Poland) Jee Ess** vs **(United States)** Gravity	**(Poland) Jee Ess**	**(Poland) Jee Ess**	**(Poland) Jee Ess**	**(Poland) Jee Ess**	**(Poland) Jee Ess**	N/A	N/A	N/A	**5**-0
**(Japan)** Jun vs **(Italy) Blaze**	**(Italy) Blaze**	**(Italy) Blaze**	**(Italy) Blaze**	**(Japan)** Jun	**(Italy) Blaze**	N/A	N/A	N/A	1-**4**
**(Ukraine) Raptor** vs **(Norway)** RythymBox	**(Ukraine) Raptor**	**(Ukraine) Raptor**	**(Ukraine) Raptor**	**(Ukraine) Raptor**	**(Norway)** RythymBox	N/A	N/A	N/A	**4**-1
**(Taiwan)** Saturn vs **(Australia) J-Attack**	**(Australia) J-Attack**	**(Taiwan)** Saturn	**(Australia) J-Attack**	**(Australia) J-Attack**	**(Australia) J-Attack**	N/A	N/A	N/A	1-**4**
**(Denmark)** Seier vs **(China) Davy**	**(China) Davy**	**(China) Davy**	**(China) Davy**	**(China) Davy**	**(China) Davy**	N/A	N/A	N/A	0-**5**
**(France)** R-One vs **(Italy) Pesto**	**(Italy) Pesto**	**(Italy) Pesto**	**(Italy) Pesto**	**(Italy) Pesto**	**(Italy) Pesto**	N/A	N/A	N/A	0-**5**
**Nord Diamond** vs **(China)** Irving	**Nord Diamond**	**Nord Diamond**	**Nord Diamond**	**Nord Diamond**	**Nord Diamond**	N/A	N/A	N/A	**5**-0
(Brazil) Mauricio vs **Miracle**	**Miracle**	**Miracle**	(Brazil) Mauricio	**Miracle**	**Miracle**	N/A	N/A	N/A	1-**4**
**(Belgium) Fabab** vs **(Netherlands)** CYZ	**(Belgium) Fabab**	**(Netherlands)** CYZ	**(Belgium) Fabab**	**(Belgium) Fabab**	**(Belgium) Fabab**	N/A	N/A	N/A	**4**-1
(China) Z vs **(Belgium) Djibril**	N/A	**(Belgium) Djibril**/ **(Belgium) Djibril**	**(Belgium) Djibril**/ **(Belgium) Djibril**	(China) Z/ **(Belgium) Djibril**	**(Belgium) Djibril**/ **(Belgium) Djibril**	**(Belgium) Djibril**/ **(Belgium) Djibril**	**(Belgium) Djibril**/ **(Belgium) Djibril**	**(Belgium) Djibril**/ **(Belgium) Djibril**	1-**6**/0-**7**
**(Japan) So-Ta** vs (Venezuela) Mini Joe	N/A	(Venezuela) Mini Joe/ (Venezuela) Mini Joe	**(Japan) So-Ta**/ (Venezuela) Mini Joe	**(Japan) So-Ta**/ **(Japan) So-Ta**	**(Japan) So-Ta**/ (Venezuela) Mini Joe	**(Japan) So-Ta**/ **(Japan) So-Ta**	**(Japan) So-Ta**/ **(Japan) So-Ta**	(Venezuela) Mini Joe/ **(Japan) So-Ta**	**5**-2/**4**-3
**(Kazakhstan) Dias** vs (Belgium) Cis	N/A	**(Kazakhstan) Dias**/ **(Kazakhstan) Dias**	(Belgium) Cis/ **(Kazakhstan) Dias**	**(Kazakhstan) Dias**/ **(Kazakhstan) Dias**	**(Kazakhstan) Dias**/ **(Kazakhstan) Dias**	**(Kazakhstan) Dias**/ **(Kazakhstan) Dias**	**(Kazakhstan) Dias**/ **(Kazakhstan) Dias**	**(Kazakhstan) Dias**/ **(Kazakhstan) Dias**	**6**-1/**7**-0
(Kazakhstan) Kalmius vs **(Poland) Jee Ess**	N/A	**(Kazakhstan) Kalmius**/ (Kazakhstan) Kalmius/ (Kazakhstan) Kalmius	**(Kazakhstan) Kalmius**/ **(Poland) Jee Ess**/ (Kazakhstan) Kalmius	(Poland) Jee Ess/ **(Poland) Jee Ess**/ **(Poland) Jee Ess**	**(Kazakhstan) Kalmius**/ **(Poland) Jee Ess**/ (Kazakhstan) Kalmius	**(Kazakhstan) Kalmius**/ **(Poland) Jee Ess**/ **(Poland) Jee Ess**	**(Kazakhstan) Kalmius**/ **(Poland) Jee Ess**/ **(Poland) Jee Ess**	**(Kazakhstan) Kalmius**/ **(Poland) Jee Ess**/ **(Poland) Jee Ess**	**6**-1/1-**6**/3-**4**
(Italy) Blaze vs **(Ukraine) Raptor**	N/A	**(Ukraine) Raptor**/ **(Ukraine) Raptor**	(Italy) Blaze/ (Italy) Blaze	**(Ukraine) Raptor**/ **(Ukraine) Raptor**	(Italy) Blaze/ **(Ukraine) Raptor**	**(Ukraine) Raptor**/ **(Ukraine) Raptor**	**(Ukraine) Raptor**/ (Italy) Blaze	**(Ukraine) Raptor**/ **(Ukraine) Raptor**	2-**5**/2-**5**
**(Australia) J-Attack** vs (China) Davy	N/A	(China) Davy/ **(Australia) J-Attack**	(China) Davy/ (China) Davy	(China) Davy/ **(Australia) J-Attack**	**(Australia) J-Attack**/ **(Australia) J-Attack**	**(Australia) J-Attack**/ **(Australia) J-Attack**	**(Australia) J-Attack**/ **(Australia) J-Attack**	**(Australia) J-Attack**/ **(Australia) J-Attack**	**4**-3/**6**-1
(Italy) Pesto vs **Nord Diamond**	N/A	**Nord Diamond**/ **Nord Diamond**	**Nord Diamond**/ **Nord Diamond**	**Nord Diamond**/ **Nord Diamond**	**Nord Diamond**/ **Nord Diamond**	**Nord Diamond**/ **Nord Diamond**	(Italy) Pesto/ **Nord Diamond**	**Nord Diamond**/ **Nord Diamond**	1-**6**/0-**7**
**Miracle** vs (Belgium) Fabab	N/A	**Miracle**/**Miracle**	**Miracle**/**Miracle**	**Miracle**/**Miracle**	**Miracle**/**Miracle**	**Miracle**/ (Belgium) Fabab	**Miracle**/**Miracle**	(Belgium) Fabab/ (Belgium) Fabab	**6**-1/**5**-2
(Belgium) Djibril vs **(Japan) So-Ta**	N/A	**(Belgium) Djibril**/ **(Japan) So-Ta**/ **(Japan) So-Ta**	**(Belgium) Djibril**/ **(Japan) So-Ta**/ **(Japan) So-Ta**	**(Belgium) Djibril**/ **(Japan) So-Ta**/ **(Japan) So-Ta**	**(Belgium) Djibril**/ **(Japan) So-Ta**/ (Belgium) Djibril	**(Belgium) Djibril**/ (Belgium) Djibril/ **(Japan) So-Ta**	**(Belgium) Djibril**/ (Belgium) Djibril/ (Belgium) Djibri	**(Belgium) Djibril**/ (Belgium) Djibril/ **(Japan) So-Ta**	**7**-0/3-**4**/2-**5**
**(Kazakhstan) Dias** vs (Poland) Jee Ess	N/A	**(Kazakhstan) Dias**/ **(Kazakhstan) Dias**	**(Kazakhstan) Dias**/ (Poland) Jee Ess	**(Kazakhstan) Dias**/ **(Kazakhstan) Dias**	**(Kazakhstan) Dias**/ **(Kazakhstan) Dias**	**(Kazakhstan) Dias**/ (Poland) Jee Ess	**(Kazakhstan) Dias**/ (Poland) Jee Ess	**(Kazakhstan) Dias**/ **(Kazakhstan) Dias**	**7**-0/**4**-3
**(Ukraine) Raptor** vs (Australia) J-Attack	N/A	**(Ukraine) Raptor**/ **(Ukraine) Raptor**	**(Ukraine) Raptor**/ **(Ukraine) Raptor**	**(Ukraine) Raptor**/ **(Ukraine) Raptor**	**(Ukraine) Raptor**/ **(Ukraine) Raptor**	**(Ukraine) Raptor**/ (Australia) J-Attack	**(Ukraine) Raptor**/ **(Ukraine) Raptor**	**(Ukraine) Raptor**/ **(Ukraine) Raptor**	**7**-0/**6**-1
**Nord Diamond** vs Miracle	N/A	Miracle/ **Miracle**/ **Nord Diamond**	**Nord Diamond**/ **Miracle**/ **Nord Diamond**	**Nord Diamond**/ Nord Diamond/ **Nord Diamond**	Miracle/ **Miracle**/ **Nord Diamond**	**Nord Diamond**/ Nord Diamond/ **Nord Diamond**	**Nord Diamond**/ Nord Diamond/ Miracle	**Nord Diamond**/ **Miracle**/ **Nord Diamond**	**5**-2/3-**4**/**6**-1
(Japan) So-Ta vs **(Kazakhstan) Dias**	N/A	**(Kazakhstan) Dias**/ **(Kazakhstan) Dias**	**(Kazakhstan) Dias**/ **(Kazakhstan) Dias**	**(Kazakhstan) Dias**/ **(Kazakhstan) Dias**	**(Kazakhstan) Dias**/ **(Kazakhstan) Dias**	**(Kazakhstan) Dias**/ **(Kazakhstan) Dias**	**(Kazakhstan) Dias**/ (Japan) So-Ta	**(Kazakhstan) Dias**/ **(Kazakhstan) Dias**	0-**7**/1-**6**
**(Ukraine) Raptor** vs Nord Diamond	N/A	**(Ukraine) Raptor**/ **(Ukraine) Raptor**	**(Ukraine) Raptor**/ **(Ukraine) Raptor**	**(Ukraine) Raptor**/ **(Ukraine) Raptor**	**(Ukraine) Raptor**/ **(Ukraine) Raptor**	**(Ukraine) Raptor**/ **(Ukraine) Raptor**	**(Ukraine) Raptor**/ **(Ukraine) Raptor**	**(Ukraine) Raptor**/ **(Ukraine) Raptor**	**7**-0/**7**-0
(Kazakhstan) Dias vs **(Ukraine) Raptor**	N/A	**(Ukraine) Raptor**/ **(Ukraine) Raptor**/ **(Kazakhstan) Dias**	**(Ukraine) Raptor**/ **(Ukraine) Raptor**/ **(Kazakhstan) Dias**	**(Ukraine) Raptor**/ **(Ukraine) Raptor**/ **(Kazakhstan) Dias**	(Kazakhstan) Dias/ **(Ukraine) Raptor**/ **(Kazakhstan) Dias**	**(Ukraine) Raptor**/ (Kazakhstan) Dias/ **(Kazakhstan) Dias**	**(Ukraine) Raptor**/ (Kazakhstan) Dias/ **(Kazakhstan) Dias**	**(Ukraine) Raptor**/ (Kazakhstan) Dias/ **(Kazakhstan) Dias**	1-**6**/3-**4**/**7**-0

==== B-Girls ====
Round of 32
(Japan) **Hiyo**^{1}	**5**
(Greece) Lito^{2}	0
(Japan) **Kaede**^{1}	**3**
(France) Chithdara^{2}	2
(Poland) **Paulina**^{1}	**4**
(Slovakia) Eli^{2}	1
(Turkey) **Jazzy**^{1}	**4**
(Switzerland) Jin^{2}	1
(Romania) **Carla**^{2}	**4**
(Norway) Strawberry^{1}	1
(Japan) Nina^{1}	0
(Mexico) **Monse**^{2}	**5**
(Brazil) **Mini Japa**^{1}	**4**
(Ukraine) Vika Wins^{2}	1
(Japan) **Ayane**^{2}	**5**
(Poland) EmKa^{1}	0
(Ukraine) Riva^{2}	2
(Poland) **Julianna**^{1}	**3**
(Poland) Mery Berry^{2}	0
(Italy) **Anti**^{1}	**5**
**Mila**^{2}	**5**
(Kazakhstan) Sayora^{1}	0
Aksi^{2}	0
(Netherlands) **India**^{1}	**5**
(South Korea) Jayon^{1}	2
(Ukraine) **Nika Star**^{2}	**3**
(Netherlands) Nora-Leah^{1}	0
(Italy) **Alessandrina**^{2}	**5**
(Taiwan) **Elsa**^{2}	**4**
(Ukraine) Sonya^{1}	1
(Japan) **Cocoa**^{2}	**5**
(Argentina) Fluxa^{1}	0

Round of 16
(Japan) **Hiyo**^{2}	**5**|**5**
(Japan) Kaede^{1}	2|2
(Poland) Paulina^{1}	1|1
(Turkey) **Jazzy**^{2}	**6**|**6**
(Romania) **Carla**^{2}	3|**6**|**6**
(Mexico) Monse^{1}	**4**|1|1
(Brazil) Mini Japa^{2}	3|0
(Japan) **Ayane**^{1}	**4**|**7**
(Poland) Julianna^{1}	0|1
(Italy) **Anti**^{2}	**7**|**6**
Mila^{2}	1|1
(Netherlands) **India**^{1}	**6**|**6**
(Ukraine) Nika Star^{1}	0|0
(Italy) **Alessandrina**^{2}	**7**|**7**
(Taiwan) Elsa^{2}	**4**|0|0
(Japan) **Cocoa**^{1}	3|**7**|**7**

Quarter-finals
(Japan) **Hiyo**^{2}	**4**|**5**
(Turkey) Jazzy^{1}	3|2
(Romania) Carla^{2}	0|1
(Japan) **Ayane**^{1}	**7**|**6**
(Italy) Anti^{1}	2|3
(Netherlands) **India**^{2}	**5**|**4**
(Italy) **Alessandrina**^{1}	**6**|**5**
(Japan) Cocoa^{2}	1|2

Semi-finals
(Japan) **Hiyo**^{1}	0|**5**|**6**
(Japan) Ayane^{2}	**7**|2|1
(Netherlands) **India**^{1}	**6**|**6**
(Italy) Alessandrina^{2}	1|1

Final
(Japan) **Hiyo**^{1}	**4**|**4**|2
(Netherlands) India^{2}	3|3|**5**

- ^{1} means they went first in the battle, ^{2} means they went second in the battle
