= B-boy Lilou =

Algerian-French b-boy breakdancer

Ali "Lilou" Ramdani
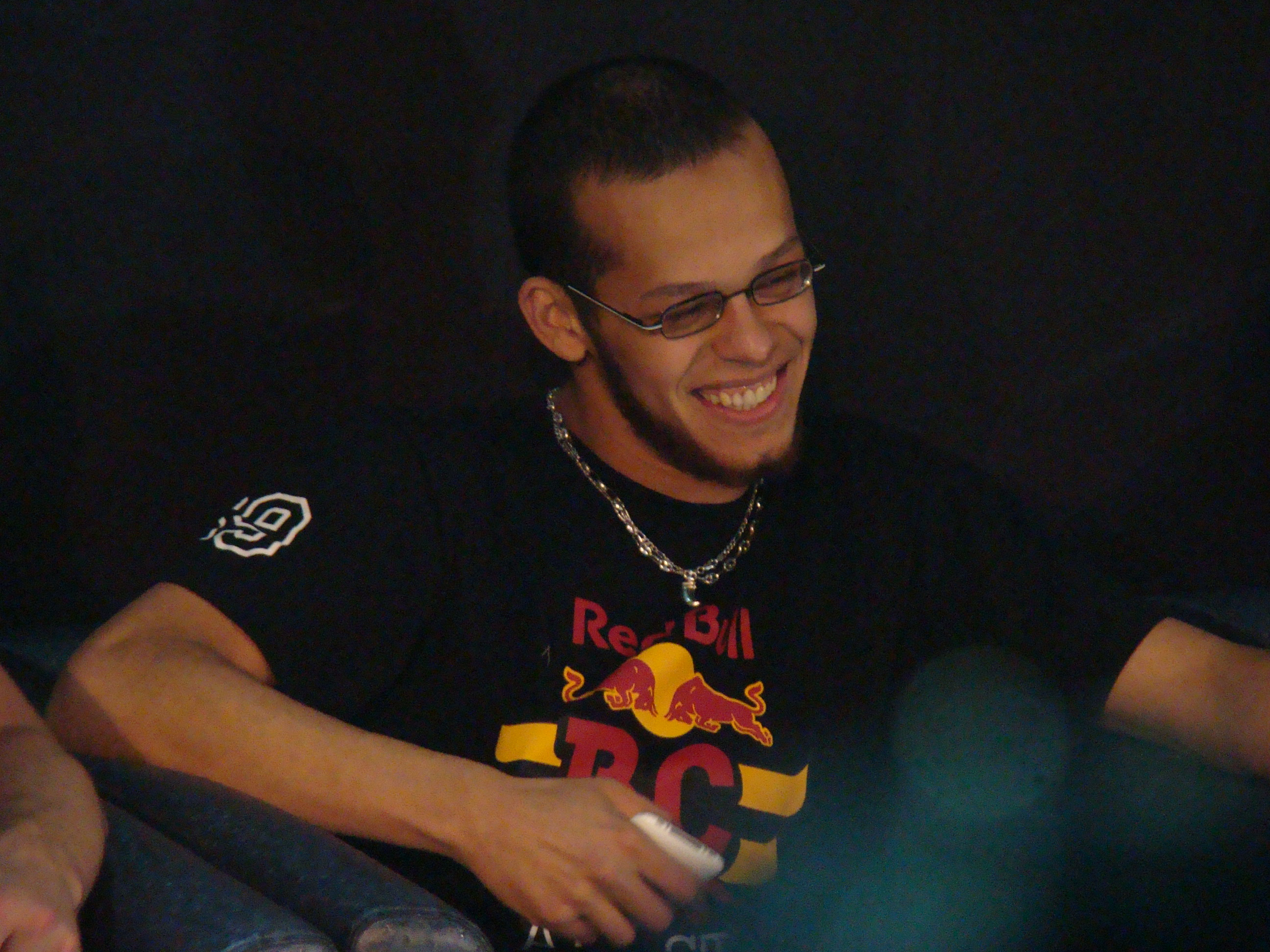
- B-boy Lilou sitting on the judging panel for the Red Bull BC One Baltic tournament in Riga, Latvia on May 14, 2011
- Born: Ali Ramdani; 18 April 1984 (age 41)
- Other names: Lilou
- Occupation: B-boy
- Known for: Being one of the only four b-boys to have won Red Bull BC One twice. Winner of the first edition of Undisputed.

Ali Ramdani (born 18 April 1984), better known by his stage name Lilou, is an Algerian-French b-boy breakdancer. He is part of the French crew Pockemon Crew and the all-star team LEGION X. Since the beginning of his career in 1999, he has won many international prizes, both with his crew and as a solo dancer. He has had a black belt in Kung Fu since he was sixteen. He practices Islam and can speak Algerian Arabic, French and English.

Lilou was the winner of the b-boy competition Red Bull BC One in 2005 and 2009. He is one of the only four competitors to have won the Red Bull BC One twice, the other three being Hong 10, Victor and Menno. He also won Battle of the Year in 2003 with Pockemon Crew. In 2005, Lilou won the Chief Rocka award at the UK Bboy Championships. The following year, he was part of the Pockemon team that won the Crews competition at the UK Bboy Championships. In 2006, Lilou was featured in the game B-Boy, released by FreeStyleGames. In 2008, Lilou took part in Chemical Brothers' music video "Midnight Madness". He also appears in the film StreetDance 2. In 2012, he joined Madonna's MDNA Tour as a dancer and choreographer. In 2014, he became the winner of Undisputed. In doing so, he became the world champion b-boy in 2014. He lists Michael Jackson, Zinedine Zidane, Muhammad Ali, and Jamiroquai as influences.
