= R-16 Korea National Championships =

South Korean breakdancing competition

This page provides the summary of the R-16 Korean National Championships held in Seoul, Korea. Winner advances to R-16 Korea World B-Boy Masters Championship.

== Winners ==
Year	Location	Winner
2015	Uijeongbu, South Korea	(South Korea) Fusion MC
2014	Seoul, South Korea	(South Korea) Gamblerz
2013	Seoul, South Korea	(South Korea) Morning of Owl
2012	Seoul, South Korea	(South Korea) Jinjo
2011	Seoul, South Korea	(South Korea) Jinjo
2010	Seoul, South Korea	(South Korea) Jinjo
2009	Incheon, South Korea	(South Korea) Rivers
2008	Suwon, South Korea	(South Korea) Gamblerz
2007	Seoul, South Korea	(South Korea) Rivers

== Format ==
Prior preliminary battles are held to determine crew seeding and which crews advance to the quarter-finals.

== Previous Results ==
=== 2015 Korea National Championships ===
Location: Uijeongbu, Korea

In 2015, a new format for R16 was created. Crew battles now only consisted of 4 b-boys. The winning crew joined the solo b-boy champion and two wild card b-boys for the world championships. Crews in bold won their respective battles.

Quarter-finals
(South Korea) **The Goonies**	**W**
(South Korea) Visual Shock	L
(South Korea) T.I.P.	L
(South Korea) **Drifterz**	**W**
(South Korea) **Rivers**	**W**
(South Korea) Chrome Hearts	L
(South Korea) Gamblerz	L
(South Korea) **Fusion MC**	**W**

Semi-finals
(South Korea) The Goonies	L
(South Korea) **Drifterz**	**W**
(South Korea) Rivers	L
(South Korea) **Fusion MC**	**W**

Final
(South Korea) **Fusion MC**	**W**
(South Korea) Drifterz	L

=== 2014 Korea National Championships ===
Location: Seoul, Korea

Crews in bold won their respective battles. Much anticipated Morning of Owl had some key injuries to their bboys and decided not to compete in 2014. As a result, Jinjo Crew also decided not to compete because they were anticipating to battle with and beat Morning of Owl.

Quarter-finals
(South Korea) **Gamblerz**	**W**
(South Korea) Giga Drill	L
(South Korea) Last for One	L
(South Korea) **The Goonies**	**W**
(South Korea) **TG Breakers**	**W**
(South Korea) Drifterz	L
(South Korea) Visual Shock	L
(South Korea) **Fusion MC**	**W**

Semi-finals
(South Korea) **Gamblerz**	**W**
(South Korea) The Goonies	L
(South Korea) TG Breakers	L
(South Korea) **Fusion MC**	**W**

Final
(South Korea) **Gamblerz**	**W**
(South Korea) Fusion MC	L

=== 2013 Korea National Championships ===
Location: Seoul, Korea

Crews in bold won their respective battles. Funky Soul Brothers, Universal Crew and Fusion MC did not qualify to the quarter-finals.

Quarter-finals
(South Korea) **Morning of Owl**	**W**
(South Korea) TG Breakers	L
(South Korea) Break Vision	L
(South Korea) **Triple J**	**W**
(South Korea) **Drifterz**	**W**
(South Korea) MB Crew	L
(South Korea) Platon Crew	L
(South Korea) **Intense Child Clan**	**W**

Semi-finals
(South Korea) **Morning of Owl**	**W**
(South Korea) Triple J	L
(South Korea) **Drifterz**	**W**
(South Korea) Intense Child Clan	L

Final
(South Korea) **Morning of Owl**	**W**
(South Korea) Drifterz	L

=== 2012 Korea National Championships ===
Location: Seoul, Korea

Crews in bold won their respective battles.

Quarter-finals
(South Korea) **Jinjo**	**W**
(South Korea) Morning of Owl	L
(South Korea) TG Breakers	L
(South Korea) **T.I.P.**	**W**
(South Korea) **Gamblerz**	**W**
(South Korea) Last For One	L
(South Korea) Korean Assassins	L
(South Korea) **Fusion MC**	**W**

Semi-finals
(South Korea) **Jinjo**	**W**
(South Korea) T.I.P.	L
(South Korea) **Gamblerz**	**W**
(South Korea) Fusion MC	L

Final
(South Korea) **Jinjo**	**W**
(South Korea) Gamblerz	L
