= BOTY Korea =

Breakdancing competition

This page provides the summary of BOTY Korea, a breakdancing competition, held in Korea. Winner advances to BOTY International also known as Battle of the Year.

== Winners ==
Crew in Bold went on and won BOTY International.

Year	Location	Winner
2015	Korea	(South Korea) MB Crew
2014	Korea	(South Korea) Fusion MC
2013	Korea	(South Korea) **Fusion MC**
2012	Korea	(South Korea) Morning of Owl
2011	Korea	(South Korea) Maximum Crew
2010	Korea	(South Korea) **Jinjo**
2009	Korea	(South Korea) **Gamblerz**
2008	Korea	(South Korea) T.I.P. Crew
2007	Korea	(South Korea) **Extreme Crew**
2006	Korea	(South Korea) Drifterz
2005	Korea	(South Korea) **Last For One**
2004	Korea	(South Korea) **Gamblerz**
2003	Korea	(South Korea) Gamblerz
2002	Korea	(South Korea) **Expression**
2001	Korea	(South Korea) Visual Shock

== Format ==
Prior showcases are held to determine crew seeding and which crews advance to the battle rounds.

== 2013 BOTY Korea Preliminaries ==
MC:

- MC Go

Judges:

- Dyzee (SuperNaturalz)
- Wing (Jinjo)
- The End (Gamblerz)

Crews in bold won their respective battles. Brother From Whole and Universal Crew did not qualify for the battle rounds.

Semi-finals
(South Korea) **Fusion MC**	**W**
(South Korea) It's Our Feeling	L
(South Korea) **Last For One**	**W**
(South Korea) Drifterz	L

Final
(South Korea) **Fusion MC**	**W**
(South Korea) Last For One	L

Fusion MC won BOTY Korea 2013 and represented Korea at BOTY International held in Germany.

== 2012 BOTY Korea Preliminaries ==
Crews in bold won their respective battles. MB Crew did not qualify for the battle rounds.

Semi-finals
(South Korea) **Morning of Owl**	**W**
(South Korea) Korean Assassins	L
(South Korea) **Fusion MC**	**W**
(South Korea) Last For One	L

Final
(South Korea) **Morning of Owl**	**W**
(South Korea) Fusion MC	L

Morning of Owl won BOTY Korea 2012 and represented Korea at BOTY International.

== 2011 BOTY Korea Preliminaries ==
Crews in bold won their respective battles. MB Crew and Fresh Family did not qualify for the battle rounds.

Semi-finals
(South Korea) **Maximum Crew**	**W**
(South Korea) TG&Cay Breakers	L
(South Korea) **Fusion MC**	**W**
(South Korea) Drifterz	L

Final
(South Korea) **Maximum Crew**	**W**
(South Korea) Fusion MC	L

Maximum Crew won BOTY Korea 2011 and represented Korea at BOTY International.
