= UK B-Boy Championships =

British annual hip-hop dance competition

The UK B-Boy Championships is a hip-hop dance competition held annually in the United Kingdom. UK B-Boy Championships, alongside Battle of the Year and R-16 Korea, is regarded to be one of the main International B-Boy Championships held every year. There are national qualifiers worldwide where dancers compete for the opportunity to represent their country at the international final held in London. The event features solo breakers, poppers, hip-hop dancers and b-boy crews from across the globe. It also host DJs and graffiti artists from other countries.

The Championships brings together dancers from around the globe—including the US, Japan, Korea, Russia, China, Holland and Scandinavia—who have won the preliminary tournaments. After a five-month search, staging eight international eliminations, the winners all converge at the Brixton Academy every year to take part in the international final. Since 2014, UK B-Boy Championships partnered up with the World B-Boy Series and helped create Undisputed, an event to crown the solo world B-Boy champion. In 2015, the UK B-Boy Championships were not held.

== Past UK B-Boy Championship results ==
Year	First place	Second place	Third place
2019	(Italy) The Italians	(United Kingdom) SMAC 19	(United Kingdom) Soul Mavericks / (Germany) The Tribe
2018	Competition was not held		
2017	(United States) Monster B-Boys	(United Kingdom) Soul Mavericks	(Japan) Ariya / (Italy) The Italians
2016	(South Korea) (Japan) (France) (Brazil) (United States) Red Bull BC One All-Stars	(Russia) Dream Team	(United Kingdom) Soul Mavericks / (Japan) Foundnation
2015	Competition was not held		
2014	(Netherlands) The Ruggeds	(Spain) Arcopom	(United Kingdom) Soul Mavericks / (France) Pockemon
2013	(South Korea) Morning of Owl	(Japan) Floorriorz	(Ukraine) Originals / (Netherlands) The Ruggeds
2012	(South Korea) Jinjo	(United Kingdom) Soul Mavericks	(Japan) Foundnation / (United States) Havikoro
2011	(France) Vagabonds	(South Korea) Jinjo	(Japan) Foundnation / (United Kingdom) Soul Mavericks
2010	(France) Vagabonds	(Russia) Top 9	(United Kingdom) Soul Mavericks / (United States) Dynamic Rockers
2009	(United States) Skill Methodz/Endangered Species	(Russia) Top 9	(South Korea) Jinjo / (Ukraine) Eastside Ruffneck
2008	(Russia) Top 9	(South Korea) T.I.P. Crew	(United States) Killafornia / (Japan) Foundnation
2007	(South Korea) T.I.P. Crew	(Russia) Top 9	(France) Pockemon / (Ukraine) Eastside B-Boys
2006	(France) Pockemon	(South Korea) Drifterz	(Japan) Skill Energy X-Men / (United States) Massive Monkeys
2005	(South Korea) Project Soul	(France) Pockemon	(United States) Rock Steady Crew / (Japan) Mortal Kombat
2004	(South Korea) Project Soul	(United States) Massive Monkeys	(Japan) Air Real / (Canada) T. Dot Essentials
2003	(United States) Skill Methodz/Havikoro	(South Korea) Project Korea	Japan All-Stars / (United States) Ground Zero Crew
2002	(South Korea) Project Korea	(France) Vagabonds	(United States) USA All-Stars / (United Kingdom) UK All-Stars
2001	(United States) USA All-Stars	(France) French All-Stars	(Hungary) Suicidal Lifestyle / (Japan) Yamato
2000	(Hungary) Suicidal Lifestyle	(Spain) Addictos	(United States) (United Kingdom) Rock Steady Crew / (France) Connexion
1999	(Canada) Bag Of Trix	(Japan) (Switzerland) Spartanic Rockers	
1998	(Japan) Spartanic Rockers	(United States) Style Elements	
1997	(United Kingdom) Second To None	(Germany) Southside Rockers	
1996	(United Kingdom) Second To None		

== Past Solo B-Boy Champions results ==
Year	Winner	Crew
2019	(United Kingdom) Kid Karam	SMAC 19
2017	(United Kingdom) Sunni	Soul Mavericks
2016	(United Kingdom) Sunni	Soul Mavericks
2014	(France) Lilou	Pockemon
2013	(Netherlands) Menno	Def Dogz/Hustle Kidz/Mighty Zulu Kingz
2012	(United States) Kareem	Rock Force Crew/Fallen Kings
2011	(United States) Morris	Fallen Kings
2010	(Russia) Flying Buddha	Top9/Mighty Zulu Kingz
2009	(United States) Morris	Fallen Kings
2008	(Russia) Kosto	Top9
2007	(Netherlands) Menno	Def Dogz/Hustle Kidz/Mighty Zulu Kingz
2006	(United Kingdom) Mouse	Soul Mavericks
2005	(United States) Roxrite	Renegades/Break Disciples/Squadron
2004	(South Korea) Physicx	Rivers
2003	(United States) Ruen	Killafornia / Style Elements
2002	(Belgium) Super G	The Dynamics
2001	(Denmark) Sonic	Natural Effects
1999	(United Kingdom) Tim Twist	Rock Steady UK
1998	(United Kingdom) Evo	Floor Freaks/Street Machine Manchester.
1997	(United Kingdom) Evo	Floor Freaks/Street Machine Manchester.
1996	(United Kingdom) Evo	Floor Freaks/Street machine Manchester.

== Past Seven2Smoke results ==
Year	Winner	Crew
2013	(United States) Gravity	5 Crew Dynasty
2012	(Japan) Issei	Found Nation
2011	(France) Wallee	Original South kingz
2010	(United States) Gravity	5 Crew Dynasty
2009	(United Kingdom) Sunni	Soul Mavericks
2008	(Finland) Thumba	Sticky Ruckus
2007	(South Korea) Eyez	T.I.P. Crew

== 2017 World Finals results ==
=== 2019 B-Boy Crew Championships ===
Crews in bold won their respective battles.

Quarter-finals
(United Kingdom) **Soul Mavericks**	**W**
(Japan) Gun Smoke Breakers	L
(Italy) Ormus	L
(United Kingdom) **SMAC 19**	**W**
(Italy) **The Italians**	**W**
(Italy) Ill Eagles	L
(United Kingdom) Battalions	L
(Germany) **The Tribe**	**W**

Semi-finals
(United Kingdom) Soul Mavericks	L
(United Kingdom) **SMAC 19**	**W**
(Italy) **The Italians**	**W**
(Germany) The Tribe	L

Final
(United Kingdom) SMAC 19	L
(Italy) **The Italians**	**W**

=== 2017 B-Boy Crew Championships ===
Crews in bold won their respective battles.

Quarter-finals
(United States) **Monster B-Boys**	**W**
(Netherlands) HFC	L
(United Kingdom) Everyone Else	L
(Italy) **The Italians**	**W**
(United Kingdom) **Soul Mavericks**	**W**
(Switzerland) Skilluminated	L
(Belgium) Freestyle Idiot	L
(Japan) **Ariya**	**W**

Semi-finals
(United States) **Monster B-Boys**	**W**
(Italy) The Italians	L
(United Kingdom) **Soul Mavericks**	**W**
(Japan) Ariya	L

Final
(United States) **Monster B-Boys**	**W**
(United Kingdom) Soul Mavericks	L

=== 2017 Undisputed Solo B-Boy Battle ===
Individuals in bold won their respective battles.

Round of 16
(United Kingdom) **Sunni**	**W**
(United Kingdom) Echo	L
(Italy) Kacyo	L
(Switzerland) **Moa**	**W**
(France) **Fever**	**W**
(Taiwan) Lil Hong	L
(United Kingdom) Infante	L
(Italy) **Kaneki**	**W**
(United Kingdom) **Kid Karam**	**W**
(Belgium) T-Rock	L
(Netherlands) **Stepper**	**W**
(Switzerland) Wen	L
(Italy) Mowgly	L
(United Kingdom) **Spin**	**W**
(Japan) **Hayato1**	**W**
(Greece) Onel	L

Quarter-finals
(United Kingdom) **Sunni**	**W**
(Switzerland) Moa	L
(France) **Fever**	**W**
(Italy) Kaneki	L
(United Kingdom) **Kid Karam**	**W**
(Netherlands) Stepper	L
(United Kingdom) **Spin**	**W**
(Japan) Hayato1	L

Semi-finals
(United Kingdom) **Sunni**	**W**
(France) Fever	L
(United Kingdom) **Kid Karam**	**W**
(United Kingdom) Spin	L

Final
(United Kingdom) **Sunni**	**W**
(United Kingdom) Kid Karam	L
Third place

== 2016 World Finals results ==
=== 2016 B-Boy Crew Championships ===
Crews in bold won their respective battles.

Quarter-finals
(United Nations) **Red Bull BC One All-Stars**	**W**
(Belgium) Team Shmetta	L
(United Kingdom) Gully Squad	L
(Japan) **Foundnation**	**W**
(Russia) **Dream Team**	**W**
(Italy) De Klan	L
(Kazakhstan) 23 Style	L
(United Kingdom) **Soul Mavericks**	**W**

Semi-finals
(United Nations) **Red Bull BC One All-Stars**	**W**
(Japan) Foundnation	L
(Russia) **Dream Team**	**W**
(United Kingdom) Soul Mavericks	L

Final
(United Nations) **Red Bull BC One All-Stars**	**W**
(Russia) Dream Team	L

=== 2016 Undisputed Solo B-Boy Battle ===
Individuals in bold won their respective battles.

Round of 16
(Russia) **Jamal**	**W**
(Italy) Kacyo	L
(Taiwan) Chen Chen	L
(Portugal) **Lagaet**	**W**
(United Kingdom) **Sunni**	**W**
(Russia) Aduh	L
(Belgium) Admir	L
(Kazakhstan) **Create**	**W**
(United States) **Roxrite**	**W**
(Kazakhstan) Volt	L
(France) **Dany**	**W**
(Greece) Onel	L
(Germany) Conni	L
(Taiwan) **Taower**	**W**
(Japan) **Taisuke**	**W**
(Belgium) T-Rock	L

Quarter-finals
(Russia) **Jamal**	**W**
(Portugal) Lagaet	L
(United Kingdom) **Sunni**	**W**
(Kazakhstan) Create	L
(United States) **Roxrite**	**W**
(France) Dany	L
(Taiwan) Taower	L
(Japan) **Taisuke**	**W**

Semi-finals
(Russia) Jamal	L
(United Kingdom) **Sunni**	**W**
(United States) Roxrite	'L
(Japan) **Taisuke**	**W**

Final
(United Kingdom) **Sunni**	**W**
(Japan) Taisuke	L
Third place

== 2014 World Finals results ==
=== 2014 B-Boy Crew Championships ===
Location: Birmingham, England

Crews in bold won their respective battles.

Quarter-finals
(Spain) **Arcopom**	**W**
(Japan) Gun Smoke Breakers	L
(United Nations) Supreme Queenz	L
(France) **Pockemon**	**W**
(United Kingdom) **Soul Mavericks**	**W**
(United Kingdom) Bunch of Guys	L
(Belgium) Killa Tactics	L
(Netherlands) **The Ruggeds**	**W**

Semi-finals
(Spain) **Arcopom**	**W**
(France) Pockemon	L
(United Kingdom) Soul Mavericks	L
(Netherlands) **The Ruggeds**	**W**

Final
(Netherlands) **The Ruggeds**	**W**
(Spain) Arcopom	L

=== 2014 Undisputed Solo B-Boy Battle ===
Location: Birmingham, England

Date: 25 & 26 October 2014

Individuals in bold won their respective battles.

Round of 16
(Algeria) **Lilou**	**W**
(Italy) Kaneki	L
(South Africa) The Curse	L
(Mexico) **Dr. Hill**	**W**
(South Korea) **Neepy**	**W**
(United Kingdom) Victor J	L
(Colombia) **Arex**	**W**
(Japan) Yosh	L
(Japan) **Katsuya**	**W**
(Algeria) Amaro	L
(United Kingdom) **Spin**	**W**
(United States) Omen	L
(Italy) Boogie	L
(United Kingdom) **Sunni**	**W**
(United States) **Kareem**	**W**
(Japan) Ayumi	L

Quarter-finals
(Algeria) **Lilou**	**W**
(Mexico) Dr. Hill	L
(South Korea) Neepy	L
(Colombia) **Arex**	**W**
(United Kingdom) **Spin**	**W**
(Japan) Katsuya	L
(United Kingdom) Sunni	L
(United States) **Kareem**	**W**

Semi-finals
(Algeria) **Lilou**	**W**
(Colombia) Arex	L
(United Kingdom) **Spin**	**W**
(United States) Kareem	L

Final
(Algeria) **Lilou**	**W**
(United Kingdom) Spin	L
Third place

Lilou ( (Algeria) ) earned the sixth bid to the Undisputed World BBoy Series at the end of the 2014 year by winning UK Bboy Championships.

== 2013 World Finals results ==
=== 2013 B-Boy Crew Championships ===
Location: Birmingham, England

Crew Championships Bracket

Crews in bold won their respective battles.

Quarter-finals
(United States) 5 Crew Dynasty	L
(Ukraine) **Originals**	**W**
(United Kingdom) Smack 19	L
(South Korea) **Morning of Owl**	**W**
(Netherlands) **The Ruggeds**	**W**
(United States) Massive Monkeys	L
(United Kingdom) Rain Crew	L
(Japan) **Flooriorz**	**W**

Semi-finals
(Ukraine) Originals	L
(South Korea) **Morning of Owl**	**W**
(Netherlands) The Ruggeds	L
(Japan) **Flooriorz**	**W**

Final
(South Korea) **Morning of Owl**	**W**
(Japan) Flooriorz	L

Solo Bboy Bracket

Individuals in bold won their respective battles.

Round of 16
(Netherlands) **Menno**	**W**
(Finland) Heavy Haiku	L
(United Kingdom) **Sunni**	**W**
(Ukraine) Apache	L
(Japan) Ryuichu	L
(Czech Republic) **Honza**	**W**
(United States) **Gravity**	**W**
(Switzerland) Wen	L
(Ukraine) **Pluto**	**W**
(United Arab Emirates) Hamza	L
(Ukraine) **Lussy Sky**	**W**
(United States) Thesis	L
(Japan) **Taisuke**	**W**
(Ukraine) Tazzmanio	L
(United States) **Nasty Ray**	**W**
(Japan) Katsuya	L

Quarter-finals
(Netherlands) **Menno**	**W**
(United Kingdom) Sunni	L
(Czech Republic) Honza	L
(United States) **Gravity**	**W**
(Ukraine) **Pluto**	**W**
(Ukraine) Lussy Sky	L
(Japan) **Taisuke**	**W**
(United States) Nasty Ray	L

Semi-finals
(Netherlands) **Menno**	**W**
(United States) Gravity	L
(Ukraine) Pluto	L
(Japan) **Taisuke**	**W**

Final
(Netherlands) **Menno**	**W**
(Japan) Taisuke	L
Third place

== 2012 World Finals results ==
Location: Birmingham, England

Crew Championships Bracket

Crews in bold won their respective battles.

Quarter-finals
(South Korea) **Jinjo**	**W**
(Greece) Dead Prezz	L
(Belgium) Team Shmetta	L
(Japan) **Found Nation**	**W**
(United Kingdom) Soul Meezy	L
(United States) Havikoro	**W**
(Spain) Arcopom	L
(United Kingdom) **Soul Mavericks**	**W**

Semi-finals
(South Korea) **Jinjo**	**W**
(Japan) Found Nation	L
(United States) Havikoro	L
(United Kingdom) **Soul Mavericks**	**W**

Final
(South Korea) **Jinjo**	**W**
(United Kingdom) Soul Mavericks	L

Solo B-Boy Battle Bracket

Individuals in bold won their respective battles.

Round of 16
(United States) **Kareem**	**W**
(China) Yu Seng	L
(United Kingdom) **Sunni**	**W**
(Finland) Hoo Hoo	L
(United States) **Moy**	**W**
(Netherlands) Tawfiq	L
(United Kingdom) **Spin**	**W**
(France) Darwin	L
(France) Chakal	L
(United States) **Vicious Victor**	**W**
(United States) **Morris**	**W**
(Belgium) Sambo	L
(Mexico) **Hill**	**W**
(France) Yuya	L
(United Kingdom) Roxy	L
(Netherlands) **Niek**	**W**

Quarter-finals
(United States) **Kareem**	**W**
(United Kingdom) Sunni	L
(United States) **Moy**	**W**
(United Kingdom) Spin	L
(United States) Vicious Victor	L
(United States) **Morris**	**W**
(Mexico) Hill	L
(Netherlands) **Niek**	**W**

Semi-finals
(United States) **Kareem**	**W**
(United States) Moy	L
(United States) Morris	L
(Netherlands) **Niek**	**W**

Final
(United States) **Kareem**	**W**
(Netherlands) Niek	L
Third place

== 2011 World Finals result ==
Crew Championships Bracket

Crews in bold won their respective battles. PM Conspiracy, or Powermove Conspiracy, was composed of several bboys from around the world.

Quarter-finals
(France) **Vegabonds**	**W**
(Netherlands) Ruggeds	L
(Russia) PM Conspiracy	L
(Japan) **Found Nation**	**W**
(South Korea) **Jinjo**	**W**
(France) La Smala	L
(United States) Dynamic Rockers	L
(United Kingdom) **Soul Mavericks**	**W**

Semi-finals
(France) **Vegabonds**	**W**
(Japan) Found Nation	L
(South Korea) **Jinjo**	**W**
(United Kingdom) Soul Mavericks	L

Final
(France) **Vegabonds**	**W**
(South Korea) Jinjo	L
