= Froz =

Russian-Italian breakdancer (b. 1985)

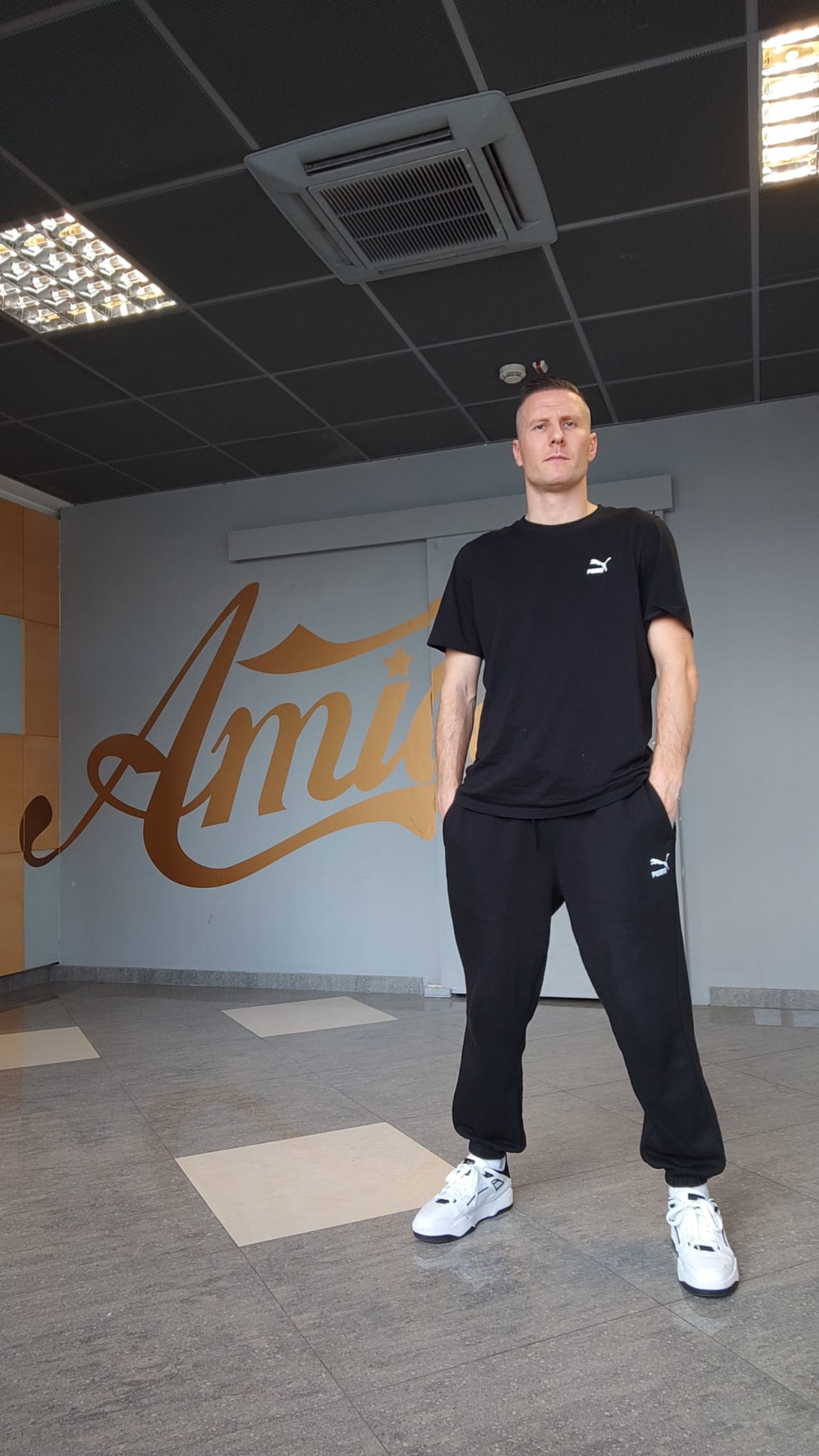
- B-boy Froz in the Amici TV studio (late 2022)
- Born: Roman Gorskiy; August 25, 1985 (age 40); Moscow, Russia
- Occupation: Dancer
- Years active: 2001–present
- Known for: Winning the Red Bull BC One Western European Finals 2013
- Website: Official profile on the website of the Bandits Crew

Roman Gorskiy (born August 25, 1985), known as Froz, is a competitive breakdancer born in Russia and raised in Italy.

== Biography ==
Roman Gorskiy was born in Moscow, Russia, on August 25, 1985. His father was coach of the Russian national women's tennis team, and due to his work issues the family moved to Conversano, Italy, in 1993. Roman Gorskiy practised basketball, tennis and karate. In 2001, after he watched the music video for Freestyler, he started training to breakdance. In 2003, he created a website about breakdancing, with tutorials and resources. In 2004, he moved to Milan and joined the breakdancing crew Bandits; the team won several national contests and he performed in ads, music videos and TV shows, and at international events.

In 2012 and 2013, he won the Italian Red Bull BC One championship, then won the Western European Finals in Naples. Eventually, he competed at the world championship in Seoul, Korea.

In 2015 he raced with b-boy Bad Matty at the second season of the Italian edition of the talent show Tú sí que vales.

In 2015, he provided live commentary for the broadcast of the Red Bull BC One, held in Rome, for Radio 105 and in 2016 he was a judge at Red Bull BC One Italy.

In 2018, with the Bandits crew, Gorskly represented Italy in the Battle Of the Year International in France.

He was a choreographer, visiting teacher and judge on the Italian television talent show Amici di Maria De Filippi.

In 2018, in Milan, Gorskly contributed to found the first professional breakdance academy in Italy.

The grandson of a Red Army soldier, Gorskly is openly sympathetic toward communism. He is an admirer of the Italian communist leader Enrico Berlinguer, and has competed wearing a red jacket with the СССР logo or a T-shirt with the symbol of the Italian partisans.
