= Battle of the Year (film) =

- Theatrical release poster
- Directed by: Benson Lee
- Screenplay by: Brin Hill; Chris Parker
- Based on: Planet B-Boy by Benson Lee
- Produced by: Beau Flynn; Tripp Vinson; Amy Lo
- Starring: Josh Holloway; Laz Alonso; Josh Peck; Caity Lotz; Chris Brown
- Cinematography: Michael Barrett
- Edited by: Peter S. Elliot
- Music by: Christopher Lennertz
- Production companies: Screen Gems; Contrafilm
- Distributed by: Sony Pictures Releasing
- Release date: September 20, 2013 (United States)
- Running time: 109 minutes
- Country: United States
- Language: English
- Budget: $20 million
- Box office: $16.5 million

Battle of the Year is a 2013 American dance film directed by Benson Lee. The film stars Josh Holloway, Chris Brown, Laz Alonso, Caity Lotz, and Josh Peck. It is based upon Lee's award-winning 2007 documentary Planet B-Boy, about the b-boying competition Battle of the Year. The feature film includes cinematography by Vasco Nunes, Lee's director of photography on the original documentary.

The film was released theatrically on September 20, 2013 by Sony Pictures Releasing to both a critical and commercial failure.

== Plot ==
Dante Graham enlists Jason Blake to coach the United States' b-boy team to compete in the Battle of the Year, as the US has not won in 15 years. Blake puts together a team of the best b-boys across America à la Dream Team.

After overcoming their differences and learning to work as a team, the Dream Team makes it to the semi-finals, beats the reigning champion French team and finds themselves against the favorites, the Koreans. Ultimately, they lose by one point. Blake resolves to resume training as soon as possible to win next year.

== Cast ==
- Josh Holloway as Jason Blake
- Chris Brown as "Rooster"
- Josh Peck as Franklyn
- Laz Alonso as Dante Graham
- Caity Lotz as Stacy
- Jon "Do Knock" Cruz as "Do Knock"
- Ivan "Flipz" Velez as "Flipz"
- Richard Carmelo Soto as "Abbstarr"
- Terrence J as himself
- Sway Calloway as himself
- Anis Cheurfa as Anis
- Weronika Rosati as Jolene
- Alex Martin as "Punk"
- Dominic Sandoval as "Grifter"
- Steve Terada as "Sight"
- Victor Kim as "Aces"
- Jesse "Casper" Brown as "Rebel"
- David "Kid David" Shreibman as "Kid"
- Luis "Luigi" Rosado as "Bambino"
- Sawandi Wilson as "Sniper"

== Development ==
Film company Screen Gems first began planning for a feature film adaptation of Lee's documentary Planet B-Boy in 2009 after discovering that while interest in breakdancing had declined in the United States, it still enjoyed popularity in other countries. Chris Brown and Josh Holloway were announced as being attached to the project in October 2011. Filming began in late 2011 in Los Angeles, with more filming taking place in Montpellier, France.

== Marketing ==
The first trailer for Battle of the Year was released in July 2013, with Adam Chitwood, Associate Editor of Collider stating that "if B-boy competitions are your thing I assume you'll have some interest in Battle of the Year." Screen Crush commented that the 3D aspect "could be a lot of fun with a film like this" but questioned whether the film would stand out against "an A-list title".

== Reception ==
=== Home media ===
Battle of the Year was released on Blu-ray Disc and DVD on December 10, 2013.

=== Critical response ===
Battle of the Year was widely panned by critics. On the review aggregator website Rotten Tomatoes, 6% of 51 critics' reviews are positive, with an average rating of 3.5/10. The website's consensus reads: "With a hopelessly hokey plot and unintentionally hilarious dialogue, Battle of the Year is flimsy even by the standards of the dance movie genre." Metacritic, which uses a weighted average, assigned the film a score of 29 out of 100, based on 21 critics, indicating "generally unfavorable" reviews.

=== Box office ===
The film was a box-office bomb, as it grossed only $16.5 million, failing to recoup its budget of $20 million.

=== Awards and nominations ===
Year	Award	Category	Nominee	Result
2014	34th Golden Raspberry Awards	Worst Supporting Actor	Chris Brown	Nominated
