= Dance Dynamite World Grand Prix =

B-boying rally in Nagoya City, Aichi Prefecture

Dance Dynamite World Grand Prix (DDWGP) is Japan's first world b-boying rally, held since autumn 2007 at a specially-constructed venue at "Oasis 21" in Nagoya City, Aichi Prefecture.

The rally was conceived to bring together b-boy champions from around the world in a competition for the global champion title. In 2008 the company ho-yu Ltd. joined as a sponsor, and the contest has since then been named the "hoyu Dance Dynamite World Grand Prix".

Before the world rally contest is held, a "General B-boy Battle" and "Kids' Street Dance Contest" take place. The winner of the "General B-boy Battle" enters the world contest.

== History ==
=== Year 2007 ===
The first rally was held on October 6, 2007. Contestant crews included Mind 180 from the United States, Wanted from France, Gambler from South Korea, and Mortal Combat from Japan.

=== Year 2008 ===
The 2008 contest was held on October 4, 2008. Crews included Massive Monkees from the United States, Wanted from France, and T.I.P. Crew from South Korea. The winner of the general B-boy battle was selected to represent Japan.

== Rizoruto ==
=== 2007 ===
Winner: Wanted (France)

2nd place: Mind 180 (U.S.A)

3rd place: Gambler (Korea)

=== 2008 ===
Winner: T.I.P. Crew (Korea)

2nd place: Wanted (France)

3rd place: Mortal Combat (Japan)

=== Attendance ===
Official figures gave an attendance of 52,300 people for the 2007 contest and 61,200 in 2008.

== Judge ==
The judging panel comprises international breakdancers, including:

- Y-Not (USA/Rock Steady Crew)
- Machine (Japan/Angel Dust Breakers)
- Lee Woo Sung (South Korea/Expression Crew)
- Lamine (France/Vagabonds Crew)
- Takeo Miyata (Japan/Spartanic Rockers)

The kids' contest is judged by:

- De La Yasu (Miami Face)
- Katsu (Mash Brush)
- Honey Waxx Aya (Jelly Belly)
- Takeo Miyata (Spartanic Rockers)
- Engin#9 (New York City Breakers/Nagoya Electric Complex)

== Media coverage ==
Coverage of the 2007 contest was broadcast locally in Nagoya by the Tokai TV station. 90 minutes of primetime coverage of the 2008 contest appeared on Mie TV.
