= Red Bull BC One Western European Finals =

This page provides the summary of RBBC1 Western European Qualifier/Finals.

Since 2012, Red Bull BC One has held a qualifier for the World Final in the Western European Region. The winner advances to the Red Bull BC One World Final.

== Winners ==
Year	Location	Winner	Crew
2015	Madrid, Spain	(Portugal) Bruce Almighty	Momentum Crew
2014	Helsinki, Finland	(France) Tonio	Inesteam
2013	Naples, Italy	(Italy) Froz	Bandits Crew
2012	Rotterdam, Netherlands	(France) Mounir	Vagabonds
2011	Barcelona, Spain	(Portugal) Lagaet	Momentum Crew

== 2015 ==
=== RBBC1 Western European 2015 results ===
Location: Madrid, Spain

Round of 16
(Switzerland) Moa	L
(France) Fenixou	W
(Spain) Xak	W
(Belgium) Simon	L
(Finland) Hoo Hoo	L
(Netherlands) Shane	W
(Austria) Valo	L
(Portugal) Bruce Almighty	W
(Sweden) Rubbish	L
(France) Nasso	W
(Netherlands) Dietje	L
(United Kingdom) Spin	W
(Norway) Daniel	W
(Netherlands) Kid Colombia	L
(Italy) Daga	L
(France) Khalil	W

Quarter-finals
(France) Fenixou	L
(Spain) Xak	W
(Netherlands) Shane	L
(Portugal) Bruce Almighty	W
(France) Nasso	W
(United Kingdom) Spin	L
(Norway) Daniel	W
(France) Khalil	L

Semi-finals
(Spain) Xak	L
(Portugal) Bruce Almighty	W
(France) Nasso	W
(Norway) Daniel	L

Final
(Portugal) Bruce Almighty	W
(France) Nasso	L
Third place

== 2014 ==
=== RBBC1 Western European 2014 results ===
Location: Helsinki, Finland

Round of 16
(Spain) Xak	L
(Portugal) Lagaet	W
(Denmark) Zoopreme	L
(Finland) Hatsolo	W
(Italy) Kacyo	L
(Netherlands) Kid Colombia	W
(Netherlands) Shane	L
(France) Tonio	W
(Belgium) Lawson	L
(France) Dany	W
(Netherlands) Skychief	W
(Austria) Harlekin	L
(Norway) Daniel	L
(United Kingdom) Spin	W
(Switzerland) Artur	W
(France) Noé	L

Quarter-finals
(Portugal) Lagaet	W
(Finland) Hatsolo	L
(Netherlands) Kid Colombia	L
(France) Tonio	W
(France) Dany	L
(Netherlands) Skychief	W
(United Kingdom) Spin	L
(Switzerland) Artur	W

Semi-finals
(Portugal) Lagaet	L
(France) Tonio	W
(Netherlands) Skychief	W
(Switzerland) Artur	L

Final
(France) Tonio	W
(Netherlands) Skychief	L
Third place

== 2013 ==
=== RBBC1 Western European 2013 results ===
Location: Naples, Italy

Round of 16
(Netherlands) Niek	L
(Spain) Chey	W
(France) Chakal	L
(Italy) Froz	W
(France) Tim	L
(Switzerland) Yu-Seng	W
(Netherlands) Skychief	W
(Italy) Alex	L
(France) Franklyn	L
(Belgium) Titris	W
(Portugal) Lagaet	W
(Austria) Valo	L
(Netherlands) Menno	W
(United Kingdom) LB	L
(Finland) Focus	W
(Greece) Dope Kid	L

Quarter-finals
(Spain) Chey	L
(Italy) Froz	W
(Switzerland) Yu-Seng	L
(Netherlands) Skychief	W
(Belgium) Titris	L
(Portugal) Lagaet	W
(Netherlands) Menno	L
(Finland) Focus	W

Semi-finals
(Italy) Froz	W
(Netherlands) Skychief	L
(Portugal) Lagaet	L
(Finland) Focus	W

Final
(Italy) Froz	W
(Finland) Focus	L
Third place

== 2012 ==
=== RBBC1 Western European 2012 results ===
Location: Rotterdam, Netherlands

Round of 16
(Portugal) Lagaet	W
(Austria) Cherry	L
(Germany) Petair	L
(Spain) Chey	W
(France) Khalil	W
(Switzerland) Yu-Seng	L
(Netherlands) Xisco	L
(Italy) Froz	W
(France) Mounir	W
(Portugal) Bruce Almighty	L
(France) Abd-L	L
(Belgium) Lawson	W
(United Kingdom) Reckless-Lee	W
(Germany) Rawmantic	L
(Netherlands) Menno	W
(Finland) Hatsolo	L

Quarter-finals
(Portugal) Lagaet	W
(Spain) Chey	L
(France) Khalil	W
(Italy) Froz	L
(France) Mounir	W
(Belgium) Lawson	L
(United Kingdom) Reckless-Lee	L
(Netherlands) Menno	W

Semi-finals
(Portugal) Lagaet	L
(France) Khalil	W
(France) Mounir	W
(Netherlands) Menno	L

Final
(France) Mounir	W
(France) Khalil	L
Third place

== 2011 ==
=== RBBC1 Western European 2011 results ===
Location: Barcelona, Spain

Round of 16
(Netherlands) Menno	W
(Portugal) Bruce Almighty	L
(France) Soso	W
(Spain) Chey	L
(Netherlands) Hurricane Ray	W
(Poland) Armstrong	L
(Netherlands) Xisco	W
(Germany) Airdit	L
(France) Khalil	W
(Netherlands) Kido	L
(United Kingdom) Sunni	W
(Belgium) Lawson	L
(Spain) Grazy	L
(France) Niggaz	W
(Switzerland) EzMike	L
(Portugal) Lagaet	W

Quarter-finals
(Netherlands) Menno	W
(France) Soso	L
(Netherlands) Hurricane Ray	W
(Netherlands) Xisco	L
(France) Khalil	W
(United Kingdom) Sunni	L
(France) Niggaz	L
(Portugal) Lagaet	W

Semi-finals
(Netherlands) Menno	W
(Netherlands) Hurricane Ray	L
(France) Khalil	L
(Portugal) Lagaet	W

Final
(Portugal) Lagaet	W
(Netherlands) Menno	L
Third place
