= Sue Son =

South Korean violinist (born 1985)

Sue Son 손수경
- Birth name: Son Sue-Kyung
- Born: 27 January 1985 (age 40); Seoul, South Korea
- Genres: Classical, classical crossover, rock, EDM
- Occupation: Musician
- Instrument: Violin
- Years active: 2011–present
- Labels: Universal Music, Daeum Entertainment
- Website: www.daeument.com

Son Sue-Kyung (Korean: 손수경; born 27 January 1985), better known by her stage name Sue Son, is a South Korean classical and crossover violinist, raised in the United Kingdom and based in Seoul. She studied at London's Royal College of Music and debuted in South Korea with her album I Am in August 2012 on Universal Music.

She first became known after appearing as a contestant on Britain's Got Talent in 2009, placing in the semi-finals.

== Biography ==
=== Background ===
Born in Seoul, Son Sue-Kyung began playing violin at the age of six, in order to be different from her piano playing elder sister, Hee Kyung. She moved to Colchester, England with her family at age 9, during the third year of elementary school, and went on to study, at the prestigious, Purcell School and London's Royal College of Music, but left as she found it too traditional, preferring to explore other styles of music.

She transferred to the Guildhall School of Music & Drama due to her wish to combine her violin work with DJ music, graduating in 2009.

=== Professional career ===
Sue Son first came to public attention after auditioning for the third series of UK talent show Britain's Got Talent, helmed by Simon Cowell. She performed as a duo called Addicted with keyboardist and former friend Janine Khalil, but were initially rejected. Invited back to perform solo, she gave a performance of Vivaldi's Summer on electric violin, impressing judges Piers Morgan and Amanda Holden as well as Simon Cowell himself, who described her performance as "phenomenal."

Appearances on popular British national TV shows GMTV and This Morning followed. At the semi-finals Son performed Explosive by Bond and met her idol, Vanessa Mae, subsequently being eliminated then.

Son then made a number of TV appearances in South Korea, including on Arirang's Heart to Heart talk show, KBS show Every Morning and on 15 August 2009, on SBS's popular TV Show Star King alongside Jo Kwon of 2AM.

Son was then chosen as an ambassador for the Seoul Tourism Organization, performing at the Annual Association Congress 2010 at London's Riverbank and at the Seoul MICE Industry Networking Concert 'Seoul on the Move' in Bangkok, Thailand. She would go on to perform again for the Seoul Tourism Organization in Las Vegas for 'Seoul Style' in October 2012.

After a year of performing at various events around the UK, Son then returned to the South Korea permanently to work on her debut material. In July 2011 her first single I Wish topped the country's crossover charts. She also became a frequent guest on Mnet's music show, Yoon Do-hyun's Must.

On 23 July 2011, Sue Son appeared on stage as a special guest of YB at their show at the Olympic Hall. She would go on to perform throughout their tour of 13 cities in South Korea.

Son performed live at the opening of the Mnet Asian Music Awards, MAMA 2011 on 29 November at Singapore Indoor Stadium. Her performance of It Burns was a collaboration with Dynamic Duo, Simon-D and YB.

Son has appeared twice on popular MBC TV show I Am a Singer, on 17 July 2011 with YB performing a cover of 크게 라디오를 켜고 by Sinawe, and August 2012 with opera singer KAI.

Sue Son's debut album I Am Son Sue Kyung was released on 29 August 2012, featuring a range of classical, rock and pop music. Guest artists included Son Seung Yeon, Hip-Hop act Dynamic Duo and Hip-Hop trio Phantom.

In November 2012 Sue Son's collaboration on the song Still You with Yoon Do-hyun of popular South Korean rock group YB was released as a video and single.

Sue Son made her acting debut as Sara Han in the 2015 film Seoul Searching.

== Discography ==
=== Singles ===
- I Wish (2011)

=== Albums ===
- I AM (2012)
