= Planet B-Boy =

- Promotional movie poster
- Directed by: Benson Lee
- Produced by: Benson Lee; Amy Lo
- Starring: Gamblerz; Ichigeki; Knucklehead Zoo; Last For One; Phase T Ken Swift; Storm; Thomas Hergenröther; Trac 2
- Cinematography: Vasco Nunes
- Edited by: Benson Lee; Jeff Marcello
- Music by: Woody Pak; IAMISEE
- Distributed by: Elephant Eye Films
- Release date: April 26, 2007 (Tribeca Film Festival)
- Running time: 101 minutes
- Country: United States
- Language: English
- Box office: $300,447

Planet B-Boy is a 2007 documentary film that focuses on the 2005 Battle of the Year while also describing B-boy culture and history as a global phenomenon. This documentary was directed by Canadian-American Korean filmmaker Benson Lee, shot by Portuguese-American filmmaker Vasco Nunes, and released in theaters in the United States on March 21, 2008. It was released on DVD on November 11, 2008.

== Content ==
Planet B-Boy features extensive footage of the dancers in competition as well as street performances and various rehearsals by the different crews from around the world. The narrative of the film centers on five particular crews (representing France, Japan, South Korea, and the United States) in their quest to win the Battle of the Year, and it includes multiple interviews with the B-Boys and their families. The film also includes interviews with German B-Boy and promoter Thomas Hergenröther (who founded the Battle of the Year competition) and legendary B-Boy Ken Swift of the Rock Steady Crew.

This film has been shown at numerous festivals around the world after originally making its debut on April 26, 2007, at the Tribeca Film Festival. Planet B-Boy has received many strong reviews and currently has a 91% rating at Rotten Tomatoes - with the consensus that "Lee's dazzling documentary makes a compelling argument for breakdancing as an art form". In March 2008 it was revealed that director Benson Lee was working on a feature adaptation of Planet B-Boy, starring Chris Brown and featuring many American b-boys such as Kid David from Renegades and Casper from Boogie Brats.

== Reception ==
On review aggregator website Rotten Tomatoes, the film holds an approval rating of 83% based on 41 reviews, with an average rating of 6.8/10.

== Awards and Selections ==
- Best Documentary Feature Award – 26th San Francisco International Asian American Film Festival
- Audience Award – 26th San Francisco International Asian American Film Festival
- Moviesquad DOC U! Award – 2007 International Documentary Film Festival Amsterdam
- Official Selection – 2007 Tribeca Film Festival
- Official Selection – 2007 Sydney Film Festival
- Official Selection – Edinburgh International Film Festival 2007
- Official Selection – 33rd Deauville American Film Festival
- Official Selection – 2008 Constellation Change Film Festival
- Official Selection – 2008 Philadelphia Asian American Film Festival
