= Vasco Nunes =

Portuguese cinematographer, producer and film director

- Born: Vasco Alves Henriques Lucas Nunes; December 13, 1974; Lisbon, Portugal
- Died: March 11, 2016 (aged 41); Los Angeles, California, US
- Occupations: Cinematographer, director, producer, editor
- Years active: 1999–2016

Vasco Alves Henriques Lucas Nunes (December 13, 1974 – March 11, 2016) was a Portuguese cinematographer, producer, and film director. In 2003, he graduated from the AFI Conservatory with a master's in cinematography, yet had begun working in the film and television industry in the early 1990s.

His work is part of the permanent collection of the Museum of Modern Art in New York City, and has garnered international cinematography awards, two Grand Jury Prizes at Sundance, a Peabody Award, a Golden Eagle Award for Investigative Journalism from CINE, an International Documentary Film Festival Amsterdam Special Jury Prize, and film selections at major film festivals, as well as executed major advertising campaigns and music projects.

== Filmography ==
- CNN & Universal - Marah Strauch's Sunshine Superman as director of photography and consulting producer (2014)
- Rooth Tang's Sway in Paris, France. (DP) (2014)
- Sony's Battle of the Year: The Dream Team in 3d (2nd Unit DP) (2013)
- MSNBC's Mind Over Mania (executive producer, cinematographer) (2012) (Winner of Golden Eagle from CINE organization for Investigative Journalism)
- Beautiful Faces (cinematographer) (2011)
- Oprah Builds a Network (cinematographer) (2012)
- Rampart (operator, H2O DP 2nd Unit) (2012)
- We Live in Public (co-producer / cinematographer) (2009) (Sundance Grand Jury Prize 2009, Karlovy-Vary Special Jury Prize)
- Anvil! The Story of Anvil (additional cinematographer) (2008) (Paramount Vantage)
- Lyle Lovett: It's Not Big It's Large (director / producer / cinematographer) (2007) (Feature DVD)
- American Teen Movie (cinematographer) (2007)
- Planet B-Boy (cinematographer) (2007) (IDFA Special Jury Prize)
- Nimrod Nation (cinematographer) (2007) (Sundance Channel Doc Series - winner of Peabody Award 2008)
- Join Us (producer) (2007) (several special jury prizes)
- Recycle (director / producer / cinematographer) (2004) (winner of Sustainability Award by Media That Matters Film Festival)
- DiG! (producer / cinematographer) (2004) (Sundance Grand Jury Prize 2004)
- Jari (producer / cinematographer) (1999)

For a detailed CV of his work: https://silo.tips/download/director-of-photography-long-form-resume

== Personal life and death ==
Vasco Nunes lived with passion in Los Angeles California, constantly pursuing his career in film, documentaries, and commercials. He was an energetic personality with a wide circle of friends who joined him on bike rides, watching world soccer matches, attending art and cultural events, and home dinner events. His family remains in Portugal, where his mother is a teacher and fine artist, his sister is an entrepreneur, artist, holistic therapist and involved in the airline industry, his father has also died five years after Vasco (11/06/2021), he was an economist, and his nephews pursue their education, the oldest finish electrotechnical engineering and telecommunications and is working in Barcelona.

Nunes was - for a few years - romantically involved with filmmaker Ondi Timoner, with whom he shares in the creation and production of various documentaries through their former company held together; Interloper Films. The relationship ended up in ongoing and unresolved court battles related to the care of their son after the couple decided to separate in 2006.

In 2016 Nunes was killed in a motorcycle accident while riding in Los Angeles. His funeral and memorial took place in Los Angeles, and his ashes were taken back to Portugal with his sister and his brother-in-law.
