= Seoul Searching =

- Film poster
- Directed by: Benson Lee
- Written by: Benson Lee
- Produced by: Andrea Chung (producer) (produced by); Benson Lee (produced by); Brigette Noh (co-producer)
- Starring: Justin Chon; Jessika Van; Teo Yoo; Esteban Ahn; Rosalina Leigh; Kang Byul; Albert Kong; Cha In-pyo
- Cinematography: Daniel Katz
- Edited by: Steven M. Choe; Benson Lee
- Music by: Woody Pak
- Production companies: Bowery Hills Entertainment; Mondo Paradiso Films
- Distributed by: Netflix
- Release dates: January 2015 (Sundance); December 2017 (Netflix)
- Running time: 105 minutes
- Countries: United States; South Korea; China
- Languages: English; German; Korean; Spanish
- Budget: $2.1 million

Seoul Searching is a 2016 American comedy-drama set in Seoul, Korea written and directed by Benson Lee and starring Justin Chon, Jessika Van, Cha In-pyo and Teo Yoo.

== Premise ==
A group of overseas high school students of Korean descent from North America and Europe land in Seoul in 1986. They arrive for a government-sponsored cultural immersion summer camp, where they are taught about Korea, and its language, history, customs and culture. Many of them have not visited South Korea before or do not speak Korean. The plot follows their experiences, through which they learn to communicate with the culture around them and each other, find friendship and love, and absorb some of their ancestral roots.

== Cast ==
- Justin Chon as Sid Park
- Jessika Van as Grace Park
- Cha In-pyo as Mr. Kim
- Teo Yoo as Klaus Kim
- Esteban Ahn as Sergio Kim
- Rosalina Leigh as Kris Schultz
- Albert Kong as Mike Song
- Han Hee-jun as Chow
- Crystal Kay as Jamie
- Nekhebet Kum Juch as Jackie Im
- Uatchet Jin Juch as Judy Im
- Sue Son as Sara Han
- Gwi-hwa Choi as Mr. Chae
- Kang Byul as Sue-jin Song
- Kim Wan-sun as Kim Wan-sun Wannabe
- Park Hyung-soo as Gangster

== Release ==
The film made its worldwide premiere at the Sundance Film Festival in January 2015.

The film was then released in theaters in New York City on June 17, 2016. It was also released in theaters in Los Angeles on June 24, 2016. The film was also shown at the Regal Medlock Crossing 18 in Johns Creek, Georgia from August 5 to August 11 of 2016.

Netflix acquired the streaming rights of the movie in Winter 2016 and released it December 2017 worldwide. It has been dubbed and/or subtitled in over 15 languages.

== Reception ==
Since its release in December 2017 on Netflix, the film has topped over 30 the "Best of Netflix" lists and in 2021 alone it topped the "Best of Netflix" lists in over 10 publications including: PopSugar, OprahDaily.comOprah Magazine, Town & Country, Seventeen, Teen Vogue

The film has a 75% rating on Rotten Tomatoes. Nick Allen of RogerEbert.com awarded the film three stars. Stephanie Merry of The Washington Post gave it two stars out of four. Timothy Tau of IndieWire graded the film an A−.

The New York Times gave it a "NYT Critics Pick" in 2016.

Justin Chang of Variety gave the film a positive review and wrote, "A unique portrait of the Korean immigrant experience distinguishes writer-director Benson Lee's messy but endearing '80s-set comedy."

Josh Terry of Deseret News gave it a negative review and wrote, "In better hands, Seoul Searching might have been a nice balance of ’80s nostalgia and sincere coming of age. Unfortunately, what we have here is a missed opportunity."

Justin Lowe of The Hollywood Reporter gave it a positive review and wrote, "Lee’s most accessible film yet looks poised to capitalize on enduring 80s nostalgia and a refreshingly appealing premise that could see the film crossing over from niche bookings to much broader appeal."

The movie was the first mainstream feature to highlight the Korean adoptee experience and diaspora in America. The film became a flagship movie for Korean adoptees which director Benson Lee said he included as they were part of the diaspora Korean adoptees experienced in their respective countries.
