= K-Pop: The Debut =

- Directed by: Benson Lee
- Screenplay by: Elyse Hollander; Eileen Shim
- Story by: Elyse Hollander
- Based on: "So You Wanna Be a K-Pop Star?" by Alina Simone
- Produced by: Scott Braun; James H. Shin; Arthur Spector; Bryan Oh; Joshua Davis
- Starring: Ji-young Yoo; Eric Nam; Tony Revolori
- Production companies: Hybe America; Epic Magazine Productions
- Distributed by: Paramount Pictures
- Release date: February 26, 2027
- Countries: South Korea; United States
- Language: English

K-Pop: The Debut is an upcoming coming-of-age musical drama film directed by Benson Lee from a screenplay by Elyse Hollander and Eileen Shim. The film stars Ji-young Yoo, Eric Nam, and Tony Revolori and is set to be released by Paramount Pictures on February 26, 2027.

== Premise ==
Lizzy Lee, a young Korean-American woman who, tired of spending her life following the path her family chose for her, secretly decides to pursue her dream after landing a spot in a competition show to form the next K-pop girl group in Seoul.

== Cast ==
- Ji-young Yoo as Lizzy Lee
- Eric Nam as Kevin Park
- Tony Revolori
- Yoo Ji-tae
- Kang So-ra
- Renata Vaca as Jojo
- Silia Kapsis
- Sung Joon as Tony
- Lee Hyung-chul
- Shana Kim as Maya
- Aliyah Turner as Aliyah
- Gia Kim
- Jubi Park
- Ahin Lee as Yumi

The members of ILLIT make a cameo appearance in the film.

== Production ==
In August 2018, it was announced that Fox 2000 Pictures was developing a film centered on K-pop with Scooter Braun and Epic Magazine attached to produce. Elyse Hollander wrote the screenplay for the film, adapting "So You Wanna Be a K-Pop Star?" by Alina Simone. In August 2020, Benson Lee was set to direct the film, now under 20th Century Studios after the acquisition of 21st Century Fox by Disney.

In July 2025, it was reported that Paramount Pictures acquired the film in turnaround. The final draft of the script was written by Eileen Shim after Lee and Adele Lim had made some revisions. Ji-young Yoo and Eric Nam were also announced to star in the film, with filming expected to "be the first major American studio film shot entirely in South Korea." In September 2025, the rest of the cast was officially announced. The film title was revealed at the 2026 CinemaCon where it was announced that Katseye would also appear in the film. Illit's involvement in the film was revealed during a surprise clip premiere during the second day of concerts at KCON LA 2026, with Nam and Yoo also making an on-stage appearance to promote the film before Illit performed.

Principal photography began in September 2025, in Seoul.

== Release ==
K-Pop: The Debut is set to be released in the United States on February 26, 2027. It was previously set to release on February 12, 2027.
