= BOTY Japan =

Japanese breakdancing competition

This page provides the summary of BOTY Japan held in Japan. Winner advances to BOTY International also known as Battle of the Year.

== Winners ==
| Year | Location | Winner |
|---|---|---|
| 2024 | Competition was not held | |
| 2023 | Japan | (Japan) Found Nation |
| 2022 | Japan | (Japan) MORTAL COMBAT |
| 2021 | Competition was not held | |
| 2020 | Competition was not held | |
| 2019 | Japan | (Japan) Body Carnival |
| 2018 | Japan | (Japan) Foundnation |
| 2017 | Japan | (Japan) Mortal Combat |
| 2016 | Japan | (Japan) Body Carnival |
| 2015 | Japan | (Japan) Flooriorz |
| 2014 | Japan | (Japan) Body Carnival |
| 2013 | Japan | (Japan) Flooriorz |
| 2012 | Japan | (Japan) Flooriorz |
| 2011 | Japan | (Japan) Nine States B-Boyz |
| 2010 | Japan | (Japan) Mortal Combat |
| 2009 | Japan | (Japan) All Area |
| 2008 | Japan | (Japan) Kaiten Ninja |
| 2007 | Japan | (Japan) Turn Phrase Crew |
| 2006 | Japan | (Japan) Mortal Combat |
| 2005 | Japan | (Japan) Ichigeki |
| 2004 | Japan | (Japan) Mortal Combat |
| 2003 | Japan | (Japan) Fireworks |
| 2002 | Japan | (Japan) Ichigeki |
| 2001 | Japan | (Japan) Team Ohh |
| 2000 | Japan | (Japan) Waseda Breakers |

Between 2007 and 2009 BOTY Asia regional preliminary sent the top 3 finishers to the BOTY International.

== 2013 BOTY Japan Preliminaries ==
BOTY Japan 2013 included an additional semi finals placer to add additional battles to the tournament. Six crews qualified after the showcase stage of the competition consisting of the two highest scoring crews automatically qualified for the semi-finals and four crews competing for the two remaining places against them.

Semi final placers
1 | (Japan) Body Carnival | W
4 | (Japan) K.A.K.B | L
3 | (Japan) Mortal Combat | W
2 | (Japan) 8 North Gate | L

(see table below)

Semi finals
1 | (Japan) Flooriorz | W
4 | (Japan) Mortal Combat | L
3 | (Japan) Found Nation | L
2 | (Japan) Body Carnival | W

Finals
(Japan) Flooriorz | W
(Japan) Body Carnival | L

Flooriorz won BOTY Japan 2013 and represented Japan at BOTY International held in Germany.
