= Benson Lee =

American filmmaker (born 1969)

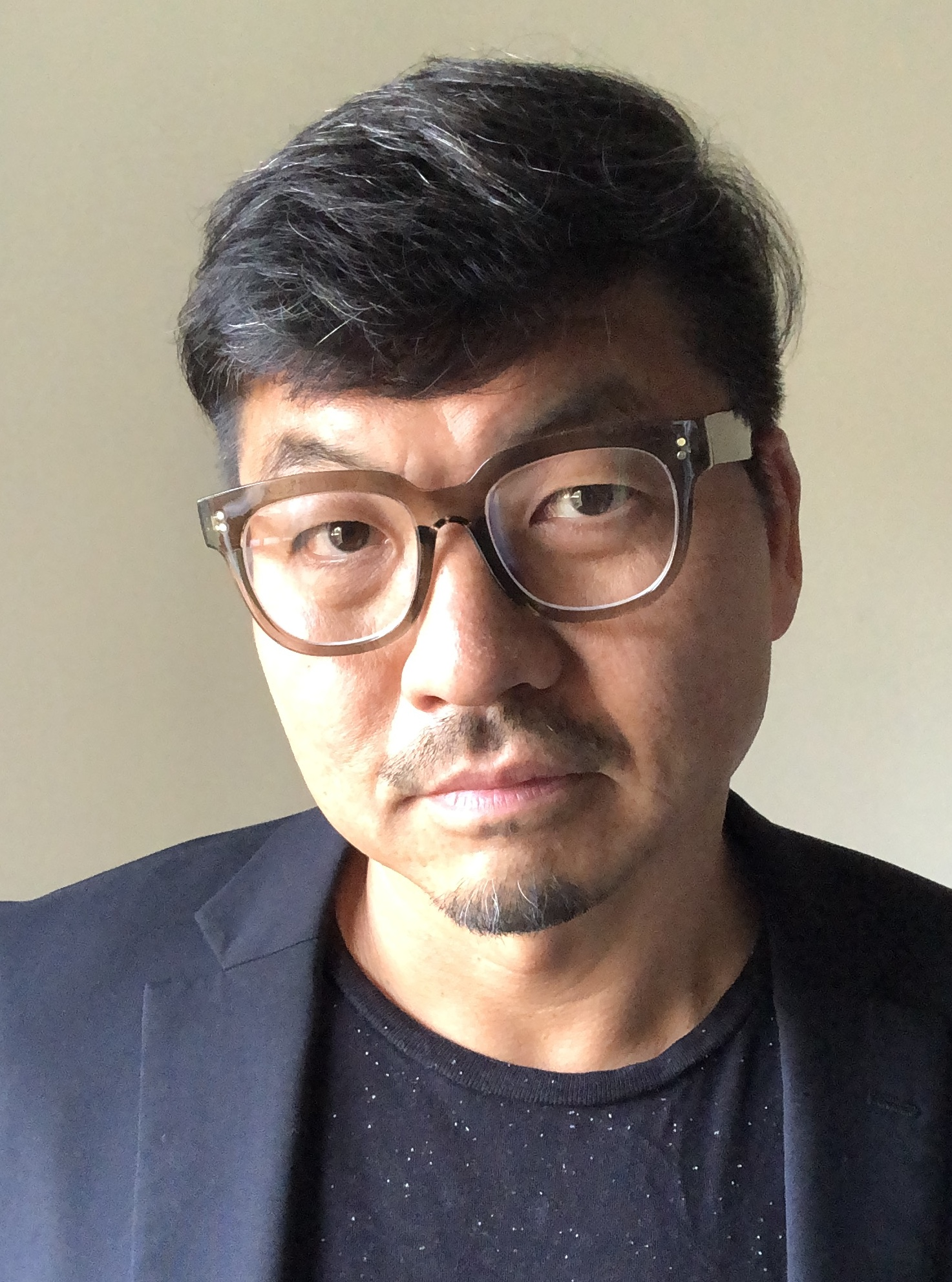
- Born: November 3, 1969 (age 57)
- Occupations: Producer, director, screenwriter

Benson Lee (born November 3, 1969) is an American filmmaker who has worked in drama, documentary, and commercial production for over twenty years.

== Education ==
Lee attended or graduated from the University of Hawaii, New York University and the Fashion Institute of Technology.

== Career ==
=== Documentaries ===
His first documentary, Planet B-Boy, was one of the top-grossing theatrical documentaries of 2008 in the US. His work has aired on HBO, MTV, the Sundance Channel, and has been theatrically distributed to over 30 countries worldwide.

=== Narrative films ===
In 1998, with his first feature film Miss Monday, Lee became the first Korean-American filmmaker to be accepted to the Dramatic Competition of the Sundance Film Festival where his film was awarded a Special Grand Jury Prize for Best Actor.

In 2011, Lee directed the 3D Hollywood adaptation of Planet B-Boy titled Battle of the Year for Sony Pictures / Screen Gems, which stars Josh Holloway, Laz Alonso, and Chris Brown. The film was released September 20, 2013.

In 2015, Lee completed the film Seoul Searching, an 80s Teen Comedy about a group of diverse Korean high school teens from around the globe, coming together in 1986 to experience the most important summer of their lives. They meet at a special summer camp in Seoul where they were sent by their parents to learn what it means to be Korean; a side to them they know little about. Although the intentions of the camp were honorable, the activities of the teens were not. The film made its premiere as an official selection of the 2015 Sundance Film Festival, and also stars Justin Chon and Jessika Van.

As of September 2025, Lee is set to direct K-Pop Superstar produced by Paramount Pictures and Hybe America. The project is anticipated to be the first production by a major U.S. studio filmed entirely in South Korea. Its expected release date is February 12, 2027.

== Filmography ==
- Miss Monday (1998)
- Black Picket Fence (2002)
- Planet B-Boy (2007)
- Battle of the Year (2013)
- Seoul Searching (2015)
- Waikiki the Movie (2020)
- K-Pop: The Debut (2027)
