= Jinjo Crew =

Jinjo Crew (Korean: 진조 크루; Hanja: 𨳌𤍒), is a South Korean b-boy crew formed in 2001. Jin (오를 진 𨳌) and Jo (불사를 조 𤍒) means 'Rising Fire (불살라 오르다) '. Jinjo Crew is famous for winning the world's top 5 major tournaments, including UK B-Boy Championships (2012), Freestyle Session (2011), Battle Of The Year (2010, 2018, 2021), R-16 Korea (2010, 2011, 2012), Red Bull BC One (2008).

== Members ==
Member	Name	Date of birth	More
Skim 스킴	Kim Heon-jun 김헌준	August 21, 1985 (age 40)	Leader
Wing 윙	Kim Heon-woo 김헌우	September 11, 1987 (age 38)	
Stony 스토니	Kang Seok-il 강석일	July 1, 1984 (age 41)	
Fleta 플레타	Lee Seung-jin 이승진	May 5, 1985 (age 40)	
Vero 베로	Jang Ji-gwang 장지광	December 28, 1986 (age 38)	
Octopus 옥토퍼스	Hwang Myeong-chan 황명찬	July 30, 1988 (age 37)	
Mold 몰드 FORMER MEMBER after imprisonment for sexual abuse	Lee Tae-gyu 이태규	August 26, 1989 (age 36)	
Big Shot 빅샷	Cho Min-geun 조민근	February 15, 1991 (age 34)	
Lilky 릴키	Park Joon-young 박준영	February 5, 1993 (age 32)	
Water1 워터원	Kim Su-il 김수일	April 15, 1996 (age 29)	
Teenie 티니	Kim Joo-yeon 김주연	September 9, 1996 (age 29)	B-girl
Kongpatra 콩파트라	Kang Jong-hyo 강종효	November 3, 1996 (age 28)	
Bekka 베카	Myeong No-hun 명노헌	January 11, 1998 (age 27)	
Javelin 자벨린	Oh Myung-kyo 오명교	July 16, 1998 (age 27)	
Ogong 오공	Kim Jeong-uk 김정욱	October 1, 2002 (age 23)	

== Noticeable Former members ==
Former Member	Name	Date of birth	Departure Year	Current Crew
FE 에프이	Oh Cheol-je 오철제	June 24, 1986 (age 39)	2019	Flow XL
Soma 소마	Kim Woo-jung 김우중	December 1, 1991 (age 33)	2022	
Kazino 카지노	Lee Jin-ho 이진호	February 8, 1995 (age 30)	2022	
Meadow 메도우	Lee Cho-won 이초원	April 25, 1992 (age 33)	2022	
