= T.I.P. Crew =

South Korean breakdancing group

- Born: Teamwork Is Perfect
- Origin: Republic of Korea
- Genres: Bboy, Breakdancing
- Occupations: Breakdance, bboy, dancing, choreography
- Years active: 1996–present
- Members: Virus; Snake; Random; Clip; Frog; Sway; Ant; Ronin; Icon5; Snipa; Thomaz Chee; Rough; King; Nemo; Jasper; Chill One; Cube; Slee; Terror; W.E.B; Read Rock; Chew; Ara; Ab; Distract; Differ
- Website: http://www.tipcrew.com/

T.I.P. Crew is a bboy crew from South Korea. T.I.P. stands for Teamwork is Perfect. Founded in 1996 by Virus (Hwang Dae Gyun; 황대균), T.I.P is the first b-boy crew in Korea. The crew has won numerous awards around the world and are still ongoing to this day. They have also appeared in music videos, movies, TV shows and commercial films.

In May 2010, 3 members of T.I.P. were arrested for feigning mental illnesses to be exempt from the South Korean compulsory military service in which able-bodied men between the ages of 18 and 35 must serve in the military for a minimum of 2 years. The arrested crew members are Bboy Virus, Bboy Differ, and Bboy Random.

From 2015 till current. Under T.I.P. Crew. Introduction of T.I.P Company The Incredible Project, Honor Breakers & Thomaz Chee's dancers, singers & Entertainment Company.

Currently still penetrating the market in Korea, Australia, Japan, Taiwan & Malaysia.

== 2007 UK B-boy Championship Winners ==
In 2007, T.I.P. were the winners of the UK B-boy Championships which was held in London. The UK B-Boy Championships are viewed as one of the world’s five major break dancing contests. The others are:

- Battle of the Year
- Red Bull BC One
- Notorious IBE
- R-16 Korea
- Freestyle Session.

== 2008 Bboy Unit World Championship ==
In September 2007, T.I.P. won the country's preliminary round for 2008's Bboy Unit World Championship. They made it up to the finals but then lost against Russian crew TOP 9.

== Sponsorships ==
- 2011 ENERGY K
- 2011 KAYE
- 2010 SOUL Korea "NEWERA"
- 2010 LG CYON "LG Cyon Bboy Championship"
- 2009 빙그레 더위사냥 "전속 모델, CF, 방송"
  (pingkure deowisanyeong "Jeonsuk Meodel, CF, bangsung"
- 2007 LG CYON

== Press ==
=== 2012 ===
- 2012 서울종합예술직업학교 무용예술학부 스트릿댄스 학과 전임교수 "박재민"
  (Seoul jeonghabye suljikeop hakgyeo muyeongye sulhakbeo suturitdaensu hakgwa jeonimkyeosu "Pak Jae Min")
- 2012 한국예술종합전문학교 실용무용학부 전임교수 "나경식"
  (Hangukye suljeong habjeonmunhakgyeo shilyeong muyeonghakbu jeonimgyeosu "Na Kyung Shik")

=== 2009 ===
- 2009 GQ Magazine
- 2009 Japan SDM Magazine 일본 스트릿 댄스 잡지 T.I.P CREW 인터뷰
  (Japan SDM Magazine ilbun suturit daensu chabji T.I.P. CREW intobyeo)

=== 2007 ===
- 2007 대한민국 제1회 B-BOY 문화상시상식 한국비보이 문화관광부 문화부 장관상
  (Daehanmin-guk je-1-hoe B-BOY munhwa sangsisangsik Han-guk biboi munhwabu janggwansang)
- 2007년 대한민국 최고의 B-BOY 팀으로 선정
  (2007nyeon Daehanmin-guk Choegoui B-BOY timeuro seonjeong)
- 2007 (전)사단법인 한국 비보이 협회 부회장 "황대균"
  ((Jeon) Sadanbeopin Hanguk biboi hyeophoe buhoejang "Hwang Daegyun")
  - 2007 서울종합예술직업학교 무용예술학부 스트릿댄스 학과 전임교수 "황대균"
    (Seoul jonghab yesul jikeob hakgyo muyong yesul hakbu seuteurit daenseu hakgwa jeonim gyeosu "Hwang Daegyun")
- 2007 “Samsung 황대균 초청강의 주제 “ 도전 ”
  (Samsung Hwang Daegyun chocheong gangui juje "Dojeon")
- 2007 Film Magazine

=== 2006 ===
- 2006 Korea in Monton "The Code" 대한민국 6대 문화상품 선정
  (Korea on Monton "The Code" daehanminguk 6dae munhwasangpeum seunjeong)

=== 2003 ===
- 2003 Cosmopolitan Magazine

== Awards ==
- BOTY International 2001: Best Showcase (Known as Visual Shock)
- BOTY Korea 2002: Semi-finalist
- BOTY Korea 2003: Semi-finalist
- BOTY Korea 2004: Finalist
- BOTY Korea 2005: Semi-finalist
- BOTY Korea 2007: Finalist, Best Showcase
- BOTY Korea 2008 : Winner
- BOTY Asia 2008: Winner
- BOTY International 2008: Runner-Up
- 2007 Bboy Unit vol.9 Korea : Semi-Finalist
- 2007 Sony Ericsson UK B-Boy Championships
  - Winner of Korea eliminations
  - Winner of World Crew Champions final
  - Differ won Break DJ Leacy Chief Rocker Award
  - Eyes won IBE SEVEN TO SMOKE
- 2008 Bboy Unit vol. 10 Korea: Winner
- 2008 Dance Dynamite World Grand Prix Japan Winner
- 2009 Cyon Bboy Championship winner

== Filmography \ Discography ==
=== 2011 ===
- 2011 Hype Nation 3D “박재민출연”
  (Hype Nation 3D "Park Jae Min cheulyeong")
- 2011 블라인드 "Beat Box WEB 고영빈 출연"
  (Beurraindu "Beat Box WEB Geoyeong Bin cheulyeong")

=== 2010 ===
- 2010 Shrek Forever After 3D "마녀들의 댄스장면"
  (Shrek Forever After 3D "manyeongdeulwi daesujangmyeon")

=== 2008 ===
- 2008 Legend of the Dancing Ninja -춤추는 닌자 전설- (2010개봉)
  (Legend of the Dancing Ninja – Cheumjeuneun ninja jeonsul – (2010jaebeung))

=== 2007 ===
- 2007 JUMP "跳出去" (2009.12.3 중국, 홍콩 개봉)
  (JUMP "跳出去" (2009.12.3 jeungguk, Heungkung jaebeung))

=== 2006 ===
- 2006 B Breakers (2006.10 부천국제판타스틱영화제 상영)
  (B Breakers (2006.10 beucheunguk jepantasu tikyeonghwaje sangyeong))

=== 2011 ===
- 2011 KBS2 “공주의 남자” (2011.방영) 박재민출연
  (KBS2 "geong jeuwi namja" (2011. bangyeong) Park Jae Min cheulyeong)
- 2011 KBS Drama :드림하이" (2011.방영) 대역 & 출연 T.I.P CREW
  (KBS Drama : Deurimhai (2011. bangyeong) daeyeong & cheulyeong T.I.P. CREW)
- 2011 KBS Drama :사랑을 믿어요” (2011.방영)
  (KBS Drama :Sarangeul mideoyo (2011. bangyeong))

=== 2010 ===
- 2010 SBS Drama :공부의 신" (2010.방영)
  (SBS Drama : geongbuwi shin (2010. bangyeong))

=== 2006 ===
- 2006 M.NET “Break” (2006년 방영)
  (M.NET "BREAK" (2006nyeon bangyeong))

=== 2012 ===
- 2012 Break the Floor 프랑스 칸에서 열리는 세계대회
  (Break The Floor peulangsu kanyeseo yeollinun sekyedaehwi)

=== 2010 ===
- 2010 6.25 60주년 "평화의몸짓" 댄스대회
  (6.25 60cheunyeon "pyeonghwawimeumjitch" daensudaehwi)

=== 2009 ===
- 2009 Red Bull BC ONE 2009 USA 한국대표 "김기헌"
  (Red Bull BC ONE 2009 United States hangukdaepeup "Kim Ki Heon")
- 2009 IBE – International Bboy Event – IBE 2009 한국대표 "김기헌,나경식"
  (IBE – International Bboy Event – IBE 2009 hangukdaepeup "Kim Ki Heon, Na Kyung Shik")
- 2009 Hoyu "Dance Dynamite World Grand Prix" (Winner)
  - 일본에서 열리는 세계대회 디펜딩 챔피언으로써 한국대표 출전
    (ilbeunyeseo yeollinun sekyedaehwi dipeonding chaempioneureusseo hangukdaepeup cheuljeon)
- 2009 WBC – World Bboy Classic 한국대표 "김기헌" (Winner)
  (WBC – World Bboy Classic hangukdaepeup "Kim Ki Heon" (Winner))
- 2009 LG CYON B-boy Championship 2009 (Winner)

=== 2008 ===
- 2008 Battle of the Year (2nd Place) 독일에서 열리는 세계대회 한국대표 출전
  (Battle of the Year (2nd Place) deukilyeseo yeollineun sekyedaehwi hangukdaepeup cheuljeon)
- 2008 UK B-boy Championship (2ND PLACE )
  - 영국에서 열리는 세계대회 Defending Champion 한국대표 출전
    (yeonggukeseo yeollineun sekyedaehwi Defending Champion hangukdaepeup cheuljeon)
- 2008 Hoyu "Dance Dynamite World Grand Prix" (Winner)
  - 일본에서 열리는 세계대회한국대표 출전
    (ilbeuneseo yeollineun sekyedaehwi hangukdaepeup cheuljeon)
- 2008 IBE – International Bboy Event 2008 한국대표 "김기헌"
  (IBE – International Bboy Event 2008 hangukdaepeup "Kim Ki Heon")
- 2008 Battle of the Year Asia (Winner) 태국에서 열리는 BOTY Asia 한국대표 출전
  (Battle of the Year Asia (Winner) taegukeseo yeollineun BOTY Asia hangukdaepeup cheuljeon)
- 2008 Battle of the Year Korea (Winner)

=== 2007 ===
- 2007 B-boy Unit International 한국예선 (Winner)
  (B-boy Unit International hangukyeseon (Winner))
- 2007 Battle of the Year Korea 한국최고의 퍼포먼스상 "Best Show"수상
  (Battle of the Year Korea hangukchoigeowi peopeumeunseusang "Best Show"seusang)
- 2007 UK B-boy Championship (Winner) 한국단일팀 최초우승
  (UK B-boy Championship (Winner) hangukdaniltim chwijeuseung)
- 2007 UK B-boy Championship Korea 2007 (Winner)

=== 2005 ===
- 2005 Time to Battle & Super Jam (Winner)
  - 스웨덴에서 열리는 대회 한국대표 출전 초청 심사위원
    (suwedeneseo yeollineun daehwi hangukdaepeup cheuljeon cheujeong shimsawiweon)
- 2005 Wild One's Way 3 vs 3 (Winner) 일본에서 열리는 대회 한국대표출전
  (Wild One's Way 3 vs 3 (Winner) ilbeuneseo yeollineun daehwi hangukdaepeup cheuljeon)

=== 2003 ===
- 2003 Battle De Massy (Winner) 프랑스에서 열리는 세계대회 한국최초 출전
  (Battle De Massy (Winner) peurangsueseo yeollineun sekyedaehwi hangukchoijeu cheuljeon)
- 2003 PUMA Korea B-boy Unit Vol.5"(WINNER)

=== 2002 ===
- 2002 UK B-boy Championship (Winner) 영국에서 열리는 세계대회 한국최초 출전
  (UK B-boy Championship (Winner) yeonggukeseo yeollineun sekyedaehwi hangukchoijeu cheuljeon)
- 2002 Korea Hip Hop Award (B-boy 부문) (Winner)
  (Korea Hip Hop Award (B-boy beumeun) (Winner))

=== 2001 ===
- 2001 Street Jam -Top of the Top(B-boy 부문) (Winner)
  (Street Jam -Top of the Top(B-boy beumeun) (Winner))
- 2001 PUMA Korea B-boy Unit Vol.2 (Winner)

=== 2009 ===
- 2009 미나 "DODO"

=== 2007 ===
- 2007 초신성 "초신성"

=== 2006 ===
- 2006 Anystar With 이준기,이효리
- 2006 빅뱅 "Good Bye Baby"
- 2006 A-BRIDGE "Dream it"

=== 2005 ===
- 2005 Baechigi "반갑습니다"
- 2005 SG워너비 "광 Remix"

=== 2003 ===
- 2003 이효리 "Hey Girl"

== Performance & Events ==
=== 2012 ===
- 2012 뮤지컬 "젊음의 행진"
  (myujikeul "jeolmeumwi haengjin")
- 2012 어린이 뮤지컬 "파워레인져 미라클 포스"
  (eolini myujikeul "paweoreainjyeo mirateul peuseu")

=== 2011 ===
- 2011 베트남가수 "홍옥화 단독콘서트" (안무감독 & 출연)
  (beteunamjaseu "heungukhwa dandeukkeunseteu" (anmeugamdeuk & cheulyeon))
- 2011 김연우콘서트 전국투어 (안무감독 & 출연)
  (Kim Yeon Woo keunseteu jeongukteueo (anmeugamdeuk & cheulyeon))
- 2011 광저우 모터쇼 "기아"
  (Gwang Je Woo meoteusyeo "kia")
- 2011 아동권리주간기념 자선행사 공연
  (Ah Dong Kwon lijeukanginyeom jaseonhaengsa gongyeon)
- 2011 "롯데월드 할로윈파티" 가든스테이지 공연
  ("reutdeuldeu halleuwonpati" kadeunseuteiji gongyeon)
- 2011 "진주 드라마어워드" 오프닝공연
  ("jincheu deuramaeoweodeo" eopeuninggongyeon)
- 2011 빅마마콘서트
  (pikmamakeunseteu)
- 2011 그린콘서트 2년연속 게스트
  (Kerinkeunseteu 2nyeonyeonsuk keseuteu)

=== 2010 ===
- 2010 Monster Jam 1 vs 1 B-boy Championship 2010
- 2010 박효신 The Last Gift Concert 안무감독, 출연
  (Park Hyo Shin The Last Gift Concert anmeugamdeuk, cheulyeon)
- 2010 2PM Concert "장우영" 파트 안무감독, 출연
  (2PM Concert "Jang Woo Young" patei anmeugamdeuk, cheulyeon)
- 2010 박용하 Concert 안무감독, 출연
  (Park Yeong Ha Concert anmeugamdeuk, cheulyeon)

=== 2009 ===
- 2009 박효신 2009 Gift Live Tour Concert 안무 감독, 출연
  (Park Hyo Shin 2009 Gift Love Tour Concert anmeugamdeuk, cheulyeon)
- 2009 Monster Jam 1 vs 1 B-boy Championship 2009
- 2009 Pussycat Dolls Live in Seoul 오프닝 무대 공연
  (Pussycat Dolls Live in Seoul eopeuning meudae geongyeon)

=== 2008 ===
- 2008 MC THE MAX & T.I.P Concert -Play Boy- T.I.P & MC THE MAX 합동콘서트
  (MC THE MAX & T.I.P Concert -Play Boy- T.I.P & MC THE MAX hapdeonggeunseteu)
- 2008 T.I.P 12th Anniversary Party" T.I.P 12주년 기념 파티
  (T.I.P 12th Anniversary Party" T.I.P 12jeunyeon kinyeon patio)
- 2008 T.I.P Concert Vol.1 -B-boy Academy- 전석매진
  (T.I.P Concert Vol.1 -B-boy Academy- jeonseokmaejin)

=== 2007 ===
- 2007 W'soul – Walkerhill 뮤지컬 Mr.춘향전 인간문화재 정재만 선생님 & T.I.P Crew 공연
  (W'soul – Walkerhill myeujikeul Mr. Cheun Hyang Jeon inkanmeunhwajae Jeong Jae Min seonsaengnim & T.I.P Crew geongyeon)
- 2007 B-boy Academy 경주세계문화엑스포 월드 B-BOY 페스티벌
  (B-boy Academy Kyung Joo sekyemeunhwaeksupeu eoldeu B-BOY peoseutibeul)
  - T.I.P 오리지널 작품 제작&공연
    (T.I.P eorijineul chakpeum jechak&geongyeon)
- 2007 MC THE MAX & T.I.P Concert -Play Boy- T.I.P & MC THE MAX 합동콘서트
  (MC THE MAX & T.I.P Concert -Play Boy- T.I.P & MC THE MAX hapdeonggeonseteu)

=== 2006 ===
- 2006 Monster Battle 한국최초 1 vs 1 World B-boy Battle 주최
  (Monster Battle hanggukchoijeu 1 vs 1 World B-boy Battle jeuchoi)
- 2006 THE CODE 안무감독, 출연
  (THE CODE anmeugamdeuk)

== Broadcasting ==
=== 2012 ===
- 2012 KBS 불후의 명곡 2 전설을 노래하다 – "성훈" with T.I.P CREW 출연
  (KBS beulheuwi myeonggeok 2 jeonseoleul neoraehada – "Seong Heon" with T.I.P CREW cheulyeon)
- 2012 CHANNEL A 이제 만나러 갑니다 "박재민 출연"
  ([CHANNEL A ije mannareo gamnida "Park Jae Min cheulyeon")
- 2012 SBS 김용만의 세대공감 1억 퀴즈쇼
  (SBS kimyeongmanwi sedaegeongkam 1eok kwijeusyeo)
- 2012 SBS 김병만의 정글의 법칙 시즌2 “Beat Box WEB 고영빈” 출연
  (SBS Kim Byeong Manwi jeongkulwi peubjik sijeun 2 "Beat Box WEB Go Yeong Bin" cheulyeon)
- 2012 JTBC 이수근 김병만의 상류사회 “Beat Box WEB 고영빈” 출연
  (JTBC Lee Su Geun Kim Byeung Manwi sangryeosahwi "Beat Box WEB geoyeungbin" cheulyeon)
- 2012 K-POP Star T.I.P CREW "박정은" 출연
  (K-POP Star T.I.P CREW "Park Jeon Eun" cheulyeon)

=== 2011 ===
- 2011 SBS 스타킹 "숙명가야금 연주단편"
  (SBS Seutaking "Seuk Myeong kayageum yeonjoodanpyeon")

=== 2010 ===
- 2010 MBC 섹션TV 연예통신 "리포터 박재민"
- 2010 SBS 출발 드림팀! 2기 "박재민&비보이편"
- 2010 M.NET Street Dance Battle

=== 2009 ===
- 2009 SBS 제2회 물 환경 대상 시상식 게스트 물 환경 퍼포먼스
- 2009 SBS 강호동의 스타킹 추석특집 이집션 비보이
- 2009 Japan Nagoya TV Show "Super Champr" 초청 배틀 우승
- 2009 SBS 강호동의 스타킹 100회 특집 안무감독 & 출연

=== 2008 ===
- 2008 MBC 게임 MSL the Final 허택용 vs 김택용 오프닝쇼

=== 2007 ===
- 2007 SBS 강호동의 스타킹 42회우승 43회 출연 왕중왕전출연
- 2007 KBS 한중 가요제 – 파핀 현준 & T.I.P 중국 한중 가요제 파핀현준 안무/댄서
- 2007 SBS 드라마 어워드 전야제 "불새" 오프닝 안무/연출/출연

=== 2006 ===
- 2006 M.NET B-BOY 드라마 Break 주조연 출연
- 2006 SBS 희망 TV 장애인 돕기 B-BOY 배틀/우승
- 2006 이재원 전 HOT멤버 이재원의 솔로 안무/댄서

=== 2000 ===
- 2000 M.NET 힙합 더바이브고정 B-BOY /배틀 게스트
