= Battle of the Year =

International breakdancing competition

Battle of the Year, commonly referred to as BOTY, is an annual international breakdancing competition that began in 1990. It has been regarded as the premier b-boying competition in the world and has been referred to as the "World Cup of B-Boying". Regional qualifying tournaments, also known as preliminaries, are held worldwide culminating in the BOTY International, the world finals event which is currently held at Sud de France Arena in Montpellier, France.

For the first twenty-three editions, Battle of the Year was a crew competition; in 2013, a one-on-one competition was added. Since 2014, the one-on-one portion of Battle of the Year is one of ten tournaments that are a part of the World BBoy Series.

The competition spawned the 2007 documentary Planet B-Boy as well as a 2013 eponymously named feature film Battle of the Year, both directed by Benson Lee. It has also gained attention for positive promotion of hip-hop culture and social unity.

== Past Battle of the Year results ==
In 2006, 2 semifinal battles were implemented, with the winner of each battle advancing to the finals. The losers of the semifinal battles do not battle each other; therefore, there is no longer a fourth-place award.

Year	First place	Second place	Losing Semifinalists	Best show
2025	(Netherlands) The Ruggeds	(Japan) Foundnation	(Japan) Body Carnival / (China) Quite Boom	(Japan) Body Carnival
2023	(Russia) Predatorz	(South Korea) Flow XL	(Netherlands) The Ruggeds / (Japan) Foundnation	(Japan) Foundnation
2022	(Netherlands) The Ruggeds	(Japan) Flooriorz	(United States) Rock Force Crew / (Japan) Mortal Combat	(Netherlands) The Ruggeds
2021	(South Korea) Jinjo Crew	(Netherlands) The Ruggeds	(United States) Squadron / (Japan) Flooriorz	(South Korea) Jinjo Crew
2019	(France) Last Squad	(South Korea) Artistreet	(Japan) Body Carnival / (Venezuela) Team Vinotinto	(South Korea) Artistreet
2018	(South Korea) Jinjo Crew	(Japan) Foundnation	(Taiwan) Top Coalition / (France) Vagabonds	(South Korea) Jinjo Crew
2017	(Japan) Flooriorz	(France) Vagabonds	(Belarus) Kienjuice / (Japan) Mortal Combat	(Japan) Flooriorz
2016	(Japan) Flooriorz	(France) Melting Force	(Japan) Body Carnival / (Belarus) Kienjuice	(France) Melting Force
2015	(Japan) Flooriorz	(Belarus) Kienjuice	(Taiwan) U-Taipei / (Spain) Doble K.O.	(Spain) Doble K.O.
2014	(Russia) Predatorz	(South Korea) Fusion MC	(Japan) Body Carnival / (Vietnam) S.I.N.E. Crew	(South Korea) Fusion MC
2013	(South Korea) Fusion MC	(Netherlands) The Ruggeds	(Germany) B-Town All Stars / (Japan) Flooriorz	(Japan) Flooriorz
2012	(France) Vagabonds	(Japan) Flooriorz	(France) Pockémon / (South Korea) Morning of Owl	(France) Vagabonds
2011	(France) Vagabonds	(United States) Battle Born	(Japan) Nine State B-boyz / (Taiwan) TPEC	(France) Vagabonds
2010	(South Korea) Jinjo Crew	(Japan) Mortal Combat	(South Korea) Gamblerz / (France) La Smala	(Japan) Mortal Combat
2009	(South Korea) Gamblerz	(Russia) Top 9	(Japan) All Area Crew / (France) Phase-T	(Japan) All Area Crew
2008	(Russia) Top 9	(South Korea) T.I.P. Crew	(Taiwan) Formosa / (France) Smokémon	(Russia) Top 9
2007	(South Korea) Extreme Crew	(Japan) Turn Phrase Crew	(France) Legiteam Obstruxion / (Germany) Funk Fellaz	(Japan) Turn Phrase Crew
2006	(France) Vagabonds	(South Korea) Last For One	(South Korea) Drifterz / (Germany) B-Town Allstars	(France) Vagabonds

Until 2006, one battle was held solely for first place and one battle was held solely for third place.

Year	First place	Second place	Third place ^{1}	Fourth place	Best show
2005	(South Korea) Last For One	(Japan) Ichigeki	(South Korea) Gamblerz	(France) Phase-T	(Japan) Ichigeki
2004	(South Korea) Gamblerz	(France) Fantastik Armada	(Germany) Stuttguard	(Italy) Break the Funk	(Italy) Break the Funk
2003	(France) Pockémon	(South Korea) Expression Crew	(South Korea) Gamblerz	(Japan) Fire Works	(Japan) Fire Works
2002	(South Korea) Expression Crew	(France) Vagabonds	(Switzerland) Deep Trip	(Russia) Top 9	(France) Vagabonds
2001	(France) Wanted	(Japan) Team Ohh	(United States) HaviKoro	(South Korea) Visual Shock	(South Korea) Visual Shock
2000	(Germany) Flying Steps	(Japan) Waseda Breakers	(Switzerland) Scrambling Feet	(South Africa) South African Allstars	(Japan) Waseda Breakers
1999	(Hungary) Suicidal Lifestyle	(United States) Rock Force	(Canada) Bag of Trix	(France) The Family	(Switzerland) (Japan) Spartanic Rockers
1998	(United States) Rock Force	(France) The Family	(United States) Phase 2	(Hungary) Suicidal Lifestyle	Spartanic Japan
1997	(United States) Style Elements	(Germany) South Side Rockers	(South Africa) Black Noise	(Hungary) Suicidal Lifestyle	(Germany) South Side Rockers
1996	(Switzerland) Toys in Effect	(Hungary) Enemy Squad	(Germany) Wedding B-Boys & Flying Steps	(Italy) Passo Sul Tempo	None awarded
1995	(France) (Italy) The Family	(Hungary) Enemy Squad	(Denmark) Out of Control	(Germany) Flying Steps	None awarded
1994	(Germany) Vlinke Vuesse	(Hungary) Enemy Squad	(United Kingdom) Always Rockin Tuff	(Switzerland) Crazy Force Crew	None awarded
1993	(United Kingdom) Always Rockin Tuff	(Germany) Fresh Force	(Hungary) Enemy Squad	(Germany) TDB	None awarded
1992	(Germany) Battle Squad	(United Kingdom) Second 2 None	(Hungary) Enemy Squad	(Germany) TDB	None awarded
1991	(Germany) Battle Squad	(Germany) TDB	(Hungary) Enemy Squad	(Germany) Fresh Force	None awarded
1990	(Germany) (United Kingdom) TDB	(Switzerland) Crazy Force Crew	(Germany) City Rockers	(China) Robot Force	

== Past Battle of the Year Solo Champions results ==
Year	Winner	Crew	Runner-up	Crew
2023	(Canada) Phil Wizard	United Rivals / 7 Commandoz	(Canada) Onton	Supernaturalz / United Rivals
2019	(United States) Zeku	Future Force Crew / Monster B-Boys	(France) Pac Pac	Bad Trip Crew / Tekken Crew
2018	(France) Dany	Vagabonds	(Russia) Beetle	Navi
2017	(Greece) Onel	Black Out Crew	(Italy) Mowgly	Marittima Funk
2016	(Portugal) Bruce Almighty	Momentum Crew	(France) Nasso	Melting Force/Arabiq Flavor
2015	(Netherlands) Menno	Hustle Kids/Def Dogs/RBBC1AS	(Russia) Alkolil	Original Breakers Circle
2014	(Russia) Alkolil	Original Breakers Circle	(Poland) Kleju	Funky Masons/Polskee Flavour
2013	(Netherlands) Menno	Hustle Kids/Def Dogs/RBBC1AS	(United States) Thesis	Knuckleheads Cali/Massive Monkees
2012	(Netherlands) Niek	The Ruggeds	(Mexico) Hill	Unik Breakers
2011	(Netherlands) Niek	The Ruggeds	(United States) Vicious Victor	MF Kidz/Squadron
2010	(United States) Thesis	Knuckleheads Cali/Massive Monkees	(Russia) Alkolil	Original Breakers Circle
2009	(France) Lilou	Pockemon/RBBC1AS	(United States) Morris	Fallen Kings/Rock Force

== Past Battle of the Year Bgirl Champions* ==
Year	Winners	Crew
2023	(Japan) Ayumi and (Algeria) (France) Sarah Bee	Body Carnival / Zamounda crew
2019	(Chile) Lil Mami	Hardcore Detroit/Venus Fly
2018	(Japan) Ayane	KAKB
2017	(Japan) Yasmin and Miju	KAKB/Sparky Jewel
2016	(Japan) Ayu and Ami	Good Foot crew
2015	(Japan) Ayane and Noa	KAKB
2014	(Japan) Shie-chan and Nagi	Air Real/Qween of Qweenz
2013	(Japan) Kanami and Myw	KANAMYM
2012	(Japan) Nao and Nagi	Qween of Qweenz
2011	(Japan) Eri Fenesis and Yurie	Qween of Qweenz
2010	(Japan) Ayumi and Micchan	Body Carnival
2009	(Japan) Shie-chan and Narumi	Air Real/Body Carnival/Qween of Qweenz

- The event was called We B Girlz until 2015.

The event is a 2 on 2 battle, but was a solo battle in 2018 and 2019.

== 2023 season ==
=== 2023 International 1 on 1 Battle results ===
Round of 16
(Japan) KidQuick	2
(Belgium) Sambo	1
(Japan) JonLemon	W
?	L
(Japan) m0nm0i	3
(Japan) Ichigo	0
(Japan) BustaBash	1
(Canada) Onton	2
(Russia) Nord Diamond	3
(Japan) Kossy	0
(Japan) OUKI	0
(Canada) Phil Wizard	3
(Japan) Taichi	3
(Japan) Dblue	0
(Japan) Ryo-G	0
(Japan) 革命前夜	3

Quarter-finals
(Japan) KidQuick	2
(Japan) JonLemon	1
(Japan) m0nm0i	1
(Canada) Onton	2
(Russia) Nord Diamond	0
(Canada) Phil Wizard	3
(Japan) Taichi	2
(Japan) 革命前夜	1

Semi-finals
(Japan) KidQuick	1
(Canada) Onton	2
(Canada) Phil Wizard	3
(Japan) Taichi	0

Final
(Canada) Onton	L
(Canada) Phil Wizard	W
Third place

== 2019 season ==
=== 2019 International 1 on 1 Battle results ===
Round of 16
(Ukraine) Pluto	5|5
(Italy) Rico	0|0
(Argentina) Primo	1|0
(France) PacPac	4|5
(Venezuela) Alvin	3|3
(South Africa) Man Like B	2|2
(Canada) Jayson	5|4
(Mexico) D-Tex	0|1
(Israel) Tricky	5|4
(Greece) Onel	0|1
(Senegal) Poxy	0|0
(United States) Zeku	5|5
(Spain) Karajos	0|2
(South Korea) Shinobi	5|3
(China) Davy	3|4
(Chile) Pancho	2|1

Quarter-finals
(Ukraine) Pluto	0|0
(France) Pac Pac	5|5
(Venezuela) Alvin	2|2
(Canada) Jayson	3|3
(Israel) Tricky	1|3|0
(United States) Zeku	4|2|5
(South Korea) Shinobi	0|1
(China) Davy	5|4

Semi-finals
(France) Pac Pac	3|2|5
(Canada) Jayson	2|3|0
(United States) Zeku	3|5
(China) Davy	2|0

Final
(France) PacPac	L
(United States) Zeku	W
Third place

== 2016 season ==
=== 2016 World Finals results ===
First Round
6	(China) STO	L
5	(Belarus) Kienjuice	W
4	(Taiwan) Taoyuan City Top Coalition	L
3	(Japan) Body Carnival	W

Semifinals
1	(France) Melting Force	W
5	(Belarus) Kienjuice	L
2	(Japan) The Flooriorz	W
3	(Japan) Body Carnival	L

Finals
1	(France) Melting Force	L
2	(Japan) Flooriorz	W

Best Show: (France) Melting Force

=== 2016 International 1 on 1 Battle results ===
Round of 16
(Portugal) Bruce Almighty	W
(Belarus) Inside	L
(Brazil) Fernandinho	W
(Italy) Elia	L
(Israel) Poter	W
(Netherlands) Kid Colombia	L
(Japan) Ayumi	W
(Greece) Zoob	L
(France) Nasso	W
(Germany) Aleks	L
(Morocco) Lil Zoo	W
(Belgium) Admiracles	L
(Japan) Taisuke	W
(United Kingdom) Spin	L
(France) Pac Pac	W
(New Zealand) Akorn	L

Quarter-finals
(Portugal) Bruce Almighty	W
(Brazil) Fernandinho	L
(Israel) Poter	W
(Japan) Ayumi	L
(France) Nasso	W
(Morocco) Lil Zoo	L
(Japan) Taisuke	W
(France) Pac Pac	L

Semi-finals
(Portugal) Bruce Almighty	W
(Israel) Poter	L
(France) Nasso	W
(Japan) Taisuke	L

Final
(Portugal) Bruce Almighty	W
(France) Nasso	L
Third place

Bruce Almighty ( (Portugal) ) earned a bid to the Undisputed World BBoy Series in Prague at the end of the 2016 year by winning BOTY Solo.

== 2015 season ==
=== 2015 World Finals results ===
First Round
4	(South Korea) MB Crew	L
5	(Belarus) Kienjuice	W
3	(Taiwan) U-Taipei	W
6	(Brazil) MOS Crew	L

Semifinals
1	(Spain) Doble KO	L
5	(Belarus) Kienjuice	W
2	(Japan) The Flooriorz	W
3	(Taiwan) U-Taipei	L

Finals
5	(Belarus) Kienjuice	L
2	(Japan) The Flooriorz	W

Best Show: (Spain) Doble KO

=== 2015 International 1 on 1 Battle results ===
Round of 16
(Netherlands) Menno	W
(Brazil) Rafastil	L
(Japan) Shigekix	W
(Belgium) Lawson	L
(United Kingdom) Sunni	W
(Italy) Kacyo	L
(United States) El Niño	W
(Taiwan) Taower	L
(Russia) Alkolil	W
(New Zealand) Akorn	L
(United States) Victor	W
(Portugal) Lagaet	L
(Canada) Fleau	W
(Greece) Onel	L
(Israel) Poter	W
(France) Dany	L

Quarter-finals
(Netherlands) Menno	W
(Japan) Shigekix	L
(United Kingdom) Sunni	W
(United States) El Niño	L
(Russia) Alkolil	W
(United States) Victor	L
(Canada) Fleau	W
(Israel) Poter	L

Semi-finals
(Netherlands) Menno	W
(United Kingdom) Sunni	L
(Russia) Alkolil	W
(Canada) Fleau	L

Final
(Netherlands) Menno	W
(Russia) Alkolil	L
Third place

Menno ( (Netherlands) ) earned a bid to the Undisputed World BBoy Series at the end of the 2015 year by winning BOTY Solo.

== 2014 season ==
=== 2014 World Finals results ===
First Round
4	(France) Infamous	L
5	(Japan) Body Carnival	W
3	(Netherlands) Ruggeds	L
6	(Vietnam) S.I.N.E. Crew	W

Semifinals
1	(South Korea) Fusion MC	W
5	(Japan) Body Carnival	L
2	(Russia) Predatorz	W
6	(Vietnam) S.I.N.E. Crew	L

Finals
1	(South Korea) Fusion MC	L
2	(Russia) Predatorz	W

Best Show: (South Korea) Fusion MC

=== Crew List for 2014 World Finals ===
Crew	Qualification
(South Korea) Fusion MC	Winner, BOTY Korea 2014
(Greece) Black Out Crew	Winner, BOTY BALKAN 2014
(Japan) Body Carnival	Winner, BOTY Japan 2014
(Italy) Last Alive	Winner, BOTY Italy 2014
(Nigeria) 619 Fellerz	Winner, BOTY Nigeria 2014
(Brazil) Street Son Crew	Winner, BOTY Brazil 2014
(United Kingdom) Soul Mavericks	Winner, BOTY UK 2014
(Russia) Predatorz	Winner, BOTY Rusia 2014
(Senegal) Crazy Elements	Winner, BOTY West Africa 2014
(France) Infamous	Winner, BOTY France 2014
(Taiwan) Ten Years in a Moment	Winner, BOTY Taiwan 2014
(Mexico) Gravedad Zero	Winner, BOTY Central America 2014
(Vietnam) S.I.N.E Crew	Winner, BOTY SEA 2014
(Germany) The Saxonz	Winner, BOTY Germany 2014
(Netherlands) The Ruggeds	Winner, BOTY BeNeLux 2014
(Israel) Unstopabullz	Winner, BOTY Israel 2014

=== 2014 International 1 on 1 Battle results ===
Round of 16
(United States) Gravity	W
(New Zealand) Hugga	L
(Russia) Alkolil	W
(Italy) Kacyo	L
(Japan) Kazuki Roc	W
(Russia) Ziprock	L
(Netherlands) Kid Columbia	W
(Brazil) Rafastil	L
(France) Noe	L
(Belgium) TRock	W
(South Africa) Benny	W
(Greece) Onel	L
(Poland) Kleju	W
(Venezuela) Mini Joe	L
(Morocco) Lil Zoo	W
(France) Khalil	L

Quarter-finals
(United States) Gravity	L
(Russia) Alkolil	W
(Japan) Kazuki Roc	W
(Netherlands) Kid Columbia	L
(Belgium) TRock	L
(South Africa) Benny	W
(Poland) Kleju	W
(Morocco) Lil Zoo	L

Semi-finals
(Russia) Alkolil	W
(Japan) Kazuki Roc	L
(South Africa) Benny	L
(Poland) Kleju	W

Final
(Russia) Alkolil	W
(Poland) Kleju	L
Third place

Alkolil ( (Russia) ) earned a bid to the Undisputed World BBoy Series at the end of the 2014 year by winning BOTY Solo.

== 2013 season ==
=== 2013 World Finals results ===
Like in 2012, Battle of the Year 2013 included an additional semifinals placer to add additional battles to the tournament. Six crews qualified after the showcase stage of the competition consisting of the two highest scoring crews automatically qualified for the semifinals and four crews competing for the two remaining places against them.

Semi final placers
3	(South Korea) Fusion MC	W
6	(Venezuela) Vino Tinto	L
4	(Netherlands) The Ruggeds	W
5	(Taiwan) KGB TC United	L

Semifinals
1	(Germany) B-Town All Stars	L
(South Korea) Fusion MC	W
2	(Japan) The Floorriorz	L
(Netherlands) The Ruggeds	W

Finals
(South Korea) Fusion MC	W
(Netherlands) The Ruggeds	L

Best Show: (Japan) The Floorriorz

=== Crew List for 2013 World Finals ===
Crew	Qualification
(Greece) WaveOmatic	Winner, BOTY Balkans 2013
(Italy) De Klan	Winner, BOTY Italy 2013
(Taiwan) KGB TC Unity	Winner, BOTY Taiwan 2013
(Japan) The Floorriorz	Winner, BOTY Japan 2013
(Israel) Unstopabullz	Winner, BOTY Israel 2013
(Belarus) Hunters Crew	Winner, BOTY Central Europe 2013
(Nigeria) Space Unlimited	Winner, BOTY Nigeria 2013
(Germany) B-Town Allstars	Winner, BOTY Germany 2013
(United Kingdom) Soul Mavericks	Winner, BOTY UK 2013
(Vietnam) S.I.N.E Crew	Winner, BOTY SEA 2013
(France) Melting Force	Winner, BOTY France 2013
(United States) Knuckle Head Zoo	Winner, BOTY USA 2013
(South Korea) Fusion MC	Winner, BOTY Korea 2013
(Venezuela) Vinotinto	Winner, BOTY Central America 2013
(Netherlands) The Ruggeds	Winner, BOTY BENELUX 2013

=== 2013 International 1 on 1 Battle results ===
Round of 16
(South Korea) Pocket	W
(Italy) Mat	L
(Japan) Issei	W
(Israel) Hulk	L
(France) Tonio	L
(Netherlands) Menno	W
(Japan) Nori	W
(Morocco) Lil Zoo	L
(Bulgaria) Slav	L
(United States) Thesis	W
(South Korea) Wing	W
(Russia) Bootuz	L
(Venezuela) Lil G	W
(Belgium) Titris	L
(Austria) Cherry	L
(Ukraine) Robin	W

Quarter-finals
(South Korea) Pocket	L
(Japan) Issei	W
(Netherlands) Menno	W
(Japan) Nori	L
(United States) Thesis	W
(South Korea) Wing	L
(Venezuela) Lil G	W
(Ukraine) Robin	L

Semi-finals
(Japan) Issei	L
(Netherlands) Menno	W
(United States) Thesis	W
(Venezuela) Lil G	L

Final
(Netherlands) Menno	W
(United States) Thesis	L
Third place

== 2012 season ==
=== 2012 World Finals results ===
Battle of the Year 2012 included an additional semifinals placer to add additional battles to the tournament. In 2012 six crews qualified after the showcase stage of the competition consisting of the two highest scoring crews automatically qualified for the semifinals and four crews competing for the two remaining places against them.

Semi final placers
3	(South Korea) Morning of Owl	W
6	(Taiwan) Formosa	L
4	(Italy) De Klan	L
5	(France) Pockemon Crew	W

Semifinals
1	(Japan) Floorriorz	W
(South Korea) Morning of Owl	L
2	(France) Vagabond Crew	W
(France) Pockemon Crew	L

Finals
(Japan) Floorriorz	L
(France) Vagabond Crew	W

Best Show: (France) Vagabond Crew

=== Crew List for 2012 World Finals ===
Crew	Qualification
(France) Vagabonds	Champion, BOTY International 2011
(Greece) Dead Prezz	Winner, BOTY Balkans 2012
(Austria) Prodigy	Winner, BOTY Central Europe 2012
(Spain) Supremos	Winner, BOTY Iberica 2012
(France) Pockemon	Winner, BOTY France 2012
(Japan) Flooriorz	Winner, BOTY Japan 2012
(Israel) Kosher Flava	Winner, BOTY Israel 2012
(Belarus) Hunters Crew	Winner, BOTY Belarus 2012
(Tunisia) Upper Underground	Winner, BOTY North Africa 2012
(Germany) Reckless Gang	Winner, BOTY Germany 2012
(Italy) De Klan	Winner, BOTY Italy 2012
(Taiwan) Formosa Crew	Winner, BOTY Taiwan 2012
(Singapore) Radical Force	Winner, BOTY SEA 2012
(Nigeria) Space Unlimited	Winner, BOTY Nigeria 2012
(Belgium) Team Shmetta	Winner, BOTY BeNeLux 2012
(South Africa) Unity Crew	Winner, BOTY South Africa 2012
(Morocco) Lhiba KingZoo	Winner, BOTY West Africa 2012
(South Korea) Morning of Owl	Winner, BOTY Korea 2012

kamikaz crew Algeria

== 2011 season ==
=== 2011 World Finals results ===
Semifinals
1	(United States) Battle Born	W
4	(Japan) Nine States B-boyz	L
3	(France) Vagabonds	W
2	(Taiwan) TPEC	L

Finals
(United States) Battle Born	L
(France) Vagabonds	W

Best Show: (France) Vagabonds

=== Crew List for 2011 World Finals ===
Crew	Qualification
(South Korea) Jinjo Crew	Champions, BOTY International 2010
(United States) Battleborn	Winner, BOTY USA 2011
(Poland) CT Group	Winner, BOTY Scandinavia 2011
(France) Vagabonds	Winner, BOTY France 2011
(Japan) Nine States B-Boyz	Winner, BOTY Japan 2011
(Taiwan) TPEC	Winner, BOTY Taiwan 2011
(Israel) Kosher Flava	Winner, BOTY Israel 2011
(Kazakhstan) Simple System	Winner, BOTY Kazakhstan 2011
(Guatemala) Guatemaya Crew	Winner, BOTY Central America 2011
(South Korea) Maximum Crew	Winner, BOTY Korea 2011
(United States) Battle Born	Winner, BOTY USA 2011
(Brazil) Amazon B-Boys	Winner, BOTY Brazil 2011
(Switzerland) Ruff'n'X	Winner, BOTY Switzerland 2011
(Algeria) Fusion Force Crew	Winner, BOTY North Africa 2011
(Tunisia) Flavaz Army	Winner, BOTY West Africa 2011
(Germany) Reckless Bunch	Winner, BOTY Germany 2011
(Thailand) OnePiece UD Town	Winner, BOTY SEA 2011
(Belgium) Hoochen Crew	Winner, BOTY Benelux 2011
(Italy) De Klan	Winner, BOTY Italy 2011
(United Arab Emirates) Slam Fam & Over Boys	Winner, BOTY Middle East 2011
(Russia) BMT & Mafia 13	Winner, BOTY Russia 2011

== 2010 season ==
=== 2010 World Finals results ===
Semifinals
1	(South Korea) Jinjo	W
4	(South Korea) Gamblerz	L
3	(Japan) Mortal Combat	W
2	(France) La Smala	L

Finals
(South Korea) Jinjo	W
(Japan) Mortal Combat	L

Best Show: (Japan) Mortal Combat

=== Crew List for 2010 World Finals ===
Crew	Qualification
(South Korea) Gamblerz	Champion, BOTY International 2009
(South Korea) Jinjo	Winner, BOTY Korea 2010
(Japan) Mortal Combat	Winner, BOTY Japan 2010
(Taiwan) Top Coalition	Winner, BOTY Taiwan 2010
(France) La Smala	Winner, BOTY France 2010
(Vietnam) Big Toe (S.I.N.E)	Winner, BOTY SEA 2010
(Italy) De Klan	Winner, BOTY Italy 2010
(Switzerland) 2DR Squad	Winner, BOTY Switzerland 2010
(Russia) Predatorz	Winner, BOTY Russia 2010
(Belgium) / (Netherlands) Team Shmetta	Winner, BOTY Benelux 2010
(Austria) PRODIGY	Winner, BOTY South East Europe 2010
(Brazil) Bio All Stars	Winner, BOTY Brazil 2010
(Kazakhstan) Simple System	Winner, BOTY Kazakhstan 2010
(Greece) Dead Prezz	Winner, BOTY Balkans 2010
(Germany) Flowjob	Winner, BOTY Germany 2010
(Guatemala) Chapin Crew	Winner, BOTY Guatemala 2010
(Israel) Unstopabullz	Winner, BOTY Israel 2010
(Algeria) Kamikaz Crew	Winner, BOTY Algeria 2010
(Morocco) La Halla King Zoo	Winner, BOTY Morocco 2010

== 2009 season ==
For the first time in the Competition's history, a 1 on 1 Tournament was held for b-boys who weren't competing as a part of a crew. The first 1 on 1 Battle of the Year final saw Lilou of Algeria defeat Morris representing the U.S..

=== 2009 World Finals results ===
Semifinals
1	(South Korea) Gamblerz	W
4	(France) Phase-T	L
3	(Japan) All Area	L
2	(Russia) Top 9	W

Finals
(South Korea) Gamblerz	W
(Russia) Top 9	L

Best Show: (Japan) All Area

=== Crew List for 2009 World Finals ===
Crew	Qualification
(Russia) Top-9	Champion, BOTY International 2008
(United Kingdom) Soul Mavericks	Winner, BOTY UK 2009
(France) Phase T	Winner, BOTY France 2009
(Austria) Prodigy Crew	Winner, BOTY SEE 2009
(Greece) Breakers Without Fear	Winner, BOTY Balkans 2009
(Belarus) Belarusian B-Boys	Winner, BOTY CIS 2009
(Belgium) Team Shmetta	Winner, BOTY Benelux 2009
(South Korea) Gamblerz	2nd place, BOTY Asia 2009
(Taiwan) Formosa	3rd place, BOTY Asia 2009
(Japan) All Area	Winner, BOTY Asia 2009
(Suriname) Myztikal	Winner, BOTY Caricom 2009
(Israel) Unstopabullz	Winner, BOTY Israel 2009
(Sweden) Octagon	Winner, BOTY Scandinavia 2009
(Italy) De Klan	Winner BOTY Italy 2009
(Germany) Funk Fellaz	Winner BOTY Germany 2009
(South Africa) Ubuntu B Boyz	Winner BOTY Africa 2009
(United States) Knuckle Head Zoo	Invited Directly
(Switzerland) Ghost Rockz	Winner BOTY Switzerland 2009
(Brazil) Amazon B Boyz	Winner BOTY Brazil 2009

== 2008 season ==
=== 2008 World Finals results ===
Semifinals
1	(South Korea) T.I.P.	W
4	(Taiwan) Formosa	L
3	(Russia) Top 9	W
2	(France) Smokémon	L

Finals
(South Korea) T.I.P.	L
(Russia) Top 9	W

Best Show: (Russia) Top 9

=== Crew List for 2008 World Finals ===
This list is in chronological order by date qualified.

Crew	Qualification
(South Korea) Extreme Crew	Champion, BOTY International 2007
(United Kingdom) Bad Taste Cru	Winner, BOTY UK 2008
(Netherlands) Groove Kingz	Winner, BOTY Benelux 2008
(France) Smokemon	Winner, BOTY France 2008
(Greece) Dead Prezz	Winner, BOTY Balkans 2008
(Poland) Crazy Twisting Tribal Team	Winner, BOTY South East Europe 2008
(Russia) Top 9	Winner, BOTY Russia 2008
(Morocco) La Halla King Zoo	Winner, BOTY West Africa 2008
(South Korea) T.I.P.	Winner, BOTY Asia 2008
(Taiwan) Formosa	2nd place, BOTY Asia 2008
(Japan) Kaiten Ninja	3rd place, BOTY Asia 2008
(Canada) Now or Never	Winner, BOTY Canada 2008
(Israel) Unstopabulls	Winner, BOTY Israel 2008
(Switzerland) Ghost Rockz	Winner, BOTY Switzerland 2008
(Brazil) Tsunami Allstars	Winner, BOTY Brazil 2008
(Germany) TNT Crew	Winner, BOTY Germany 2008
(Sweden) Octagon	Winner, BOTY Scandinavia 2008
(Spain) Fallen Angels Crew	Winner, BOTY Iberica 2008
(United States) Furious Soldiers	Winner, BOTY USA 2008

== 2007 season ==
=== 2007 World Finals results ===
Semifinals
1	(France) Legiteam Obstruktion	L
4	(South Korea) Extreme Crew	W
3	(Japan) Turn Phrase Crew	W
2	(Germany) Funk Fellaz	L

Finals
(South Korea) Extreme Crew	W
(Japan) Turn Phrase Crew	L

Best Show: (Japan) Turn Phrase Crew

=== Crew List for 2007 World Finals ===
This list is in chronological order by date qualified. Preliminaries that have not occurred yet have a colored background.

Crew	Qualification
(Belgium) Hoochen	Winner, BOTY Benelux 2007
(Hungary) Sick 7	Winner, BOTY South East Europe 2007
(Bulgaria) Plastic Def Squad	Winner, BOTY Balkans 2007
(France) Legiteam Obstruktion	Winner, BOTY France 2007
(Italy) Rapid Soul Moves	Winner, BOTY Italy 2007
(Spain) Fallen Angels Crew	Winner, BOTY Iberica 2007
(South Korea) Extreme (Obo Wang) Crew	Winner, BOTY Asia 2007
(Japan) Turn Phrase Crew	2nd place, BOTY Asia 2007
(Thailand) Ground Scatter Crew	3rd place, BOTY Asia 2007
(Israel) Breakerholics	Winner, BOTY Israel 2007
(Sweden) Ultimate Desperados	Winner, BOTY Scandinavia 2007
(Germany) Funk Fellaz	Winner, BOTY Germany 2007
(Switzerland) Ruff'n'X Crew	Winner, BOTY Switzerland 2007
(Brazil) DF Zulu Breakers	Winner, BOTY Brazil 2007
(France) Vagabonds (withdrew)	Champion, BOTY International 2006
(South Africa) Last Minute Crew (withdrew)	Winner, BOTY South Africa 2007

== 2006 season ==
=== 2006 World Finals results ===
Semifinals
1	(France) Vagabonds	W
4	(South Korea) Drifterz	L
3	(South Korea) Last For One	W
2	(Germany) B-Town Allstars	L

Finals
(France) Vagabonds	W
(South Korea) Last For One	L

Best Show: (France) Vagabonds

=== Crew List for 2006 World Finals ===
Crew	Qualification
(South Korea) Last For One	Champion, BOTY International 2005
(France) Vagabonds	Winner, BOTY Asia 2006
(Bulgaria) Electric Force Crew	Winner, BOTY Balkans 2006
(Sweden) Octagon	Winner, BOTY Scandinavia 2006
(Russia) Top 9	Winner, BOTY Russia 2006
(Austria) Moving Shadows	Winner, BOTY South East Europe 2006
(Italy) Ormus Force	Winner, BOTY Italy 2006
(Latvia) Camelot	Winner, BOTY North East Europe 2006
(Japan) Mortal Combat	Winner, BOTY Japan 2006
(Spain) Fallen Angels	Winner, BOTY Iberica 2006
(Israel) Lions of Zion	Winner, BOTY Israel 2006
(China) STO	Winner, BOTY China 2006
(United States) Knuckle Head Zoo	Winner, BOTY USA 2006
(Thailand) Ground Scatter Crew	Winner, BOTY South East Asia 2006
(South Africa) Ubuntu	Winner, BOTY South Africa 2006
(Taiwan) HRC	Winner, BOTY Taiwan 2006
(Germany) B-Town Allstars	Winner, BOTY Germany 2006
(Switzerland) Ruff'n'X Crew	Winner, BOTY Switzerland 2006
(South Korea) Drifterz Crew	Winner, BOTY Korea 2006
(Netherlands) Floor Burning	Winner, BOTY Benelux 2006

== Series Format ==
=== World Finals Format ===
The format comprises firstly a showcase round in which all crews perform a routine of no more than six minutes in length demonstrating their ability in the different styles of breakdance. Judges rank all competing crews by evaluating certain criteria based on the shows.

Following the showcase round, the top four crews are selected to take part in a crew-vs-crew battle playoff. In the semifinals, the top-ranked crew battles the 4th-ranked crew and the 2nd-ranked crew battles the 3rd-ranked crew. The winner of each semifinal then battle each other for the championship.

An award, "Best Show", is also given to the crew that had the best-scoring showcase.

=== Scoring Criteria ===
Judges evaluate the showcase round on two main elements, artistry and technicality, each of which includes several criteria. The artistry element includes theme, music, synchronicity, and choreography, among others. The technicality element includes toprock, uprock, footwork, and power moves, among others.

=== Qualification and Preliminaries ===
The champion of the world finals is always invited directly to the following year's world finals to defend their title. All other crews qualify via preliminary tournaments, although historically there have been a few instances of directly-invited crews (usually when there is no preliminary in that crew's region).

Qualification is moving towards a two-step system consisting of individual country preliminaries followed by regional preliminaries. Historically, each country had an individual preliminary and sent one crew to the world finals; however, countries have become more and more regionalized over the years. For example, starting in 2007, there is a new BOTY Asia regional preliminary that will send the top 3 finishers to the world finals; in 2006 and years prior, Asia region countries such as South Korea, Japan, China, and Taiwan had their own preliminaries and sent one crew each to the world finals.

The following is a chart showing the regions and countries in the region, as well as number of crews sent to the world finals, for the 2007 season.

Region	Crews Sent	Member Countries
BOTY Asia	3	China, Indonesia, Japan, South Korea, Laos, Malaysia, Philippines, Singapore, Taiwan, Thailand, Vietnam,India*
BOTY Balkans	1	Albania, Bosnia and Herzegovina, Bulgaria, Cyprus, Greece, North Macedonia, Montenegro, Romania, Serbia, Turkey
BOTY Benelux	1	Belgium, Luxembourg, Netherlands
BOTY Iberica	1	Portugal, Spain
BOTY North East Europe*	0	Belarus, Estonia, Latvia, Lithuania,
BOTY Scandinavia	1	Denmark, Finland, Norway, Sweden; also, BOTY North East Europe member countries are invited to participate*
BOTY South East Europe	1	Austria, Bosnia, Croatia, Hungary, Slovenia, Czech Republic, Poland, Slovakia

* Winner of BOTY India will participate in BOTY Asia from 2011
* BOTY North East Europe regional preliminary was canceled. On July 10, 2007, it was announced that BOTY North East Europe member countries would be allowed to enter BOTY Scandinavia.
** On September 7, 2007, the BOTY USA 2007 qualifier was announced; however, it was canceled less than one month later.

=== World Finals Format History ===
Prior to 2006, the current championship playoff system was not used. Instead, there were only two battles: two crews would compete for first place, while two other crews would compete for third place. While a "Best Show" award was still granted based on showcase performance, the judges would also rank the crews as to who they thought should participate in the championship battle. This resulted in frequently-occurring situations where the crew that received the "Best Show" award was not even able to compete for the championship, as they were picked for the third place battle instead of the championship battle. Examples include three "Best Show" winners in the final five years under the old format: Break the Funk (2004), Fire Works (2003), and Visual Shock (2001). The change to the playoff system also brought the world finals format into line with some of the qualifier formats, such as the BOTY Korea Preliminary, which has been using the four-crew playoff system for years.

Starting in 2004, a strict 6-minute time limit per crew on the showcase was enforced for the world finals, with scoring penalties assessed for going over time. This was enacted so that the world finals event would finish in a shorter time period. The 6-minute limit was quickly adopted at preliminaries.

In 1990, when the event was known as the International Breakdance Cup, there were only shows and no battles. From 1991-1996, there were battles resulting in a crowned champion, but no "Best Show" award was given.

== Media ==
An official DVD documenting the event is usually released a few months after the tournament. It has consistently been a best seller on breaking and hip-hop media retail web sites.

Several documentaries have been produced based on the competition, including the 2007 feature-length documentary Planet B-Boy. The film premiered at the 2007 TriBeCa Film Festival and was released on DVD on November 11, 2008.

A movie based on this competition, called Battle of the Year, was released on September 20, 2013. The film was directed by Benson Lee, who produced Planet B-Boy, and featured famous artist Chris Brown in the primary role.

On occasion with the annual competition, a CD/LP titled "The Official Battle Of The Year Motion Soundtrack" is released since 1998. It features some of the leading B-Boy Funk artists such as Mr. Confuse, Cosmic EFI, DJ Nas'D, Esone, Def Cut, Cutmaster GB, and DJ Phantom. The cover artwork is drawn by graffiti artist Mode 2.
