= Morning of Owl =

- Origin: Suwon, South Korea
- Genres: Bboy, breakdancing
- Years active: 2002–present
- Members: Do Young; Mori
- Website: morningofowl.wixsite.com/moomoo

Morning of Owl was a b-boy crew founded in 2002 from Suwon, South Korea. They have won multiple b-boy competitions in Korea and abroad. They've been involved in the b-boying community with their creative shows, as well as in the battle scene. They are known for expressing originality and creativity in their dance. Morning of Owl has performed multiple shows throughout Korea as well as in the UK.

In 2012, Morning of Owl won Battle of the Year Korea and placed in the top 4 in the Battle of the Year World Finals.

In 2013, Morning of Owl won R-16 Korea; R-16 World B-Boy Masters Championship; Break the Floor as Project Soul in Cannes, France; Block Party Battle in France; Rochefort Battle in France; DLK Inspiration Jam Battle, Sweden; United Syles World Finals, Switzerland; Rockin Sensation, Korea; Dance live Korea Battle Side; Gangjin Bboy Masters Championship as well as UK B-Boy Championships. By winning R-16 and UK B-Boy Championships, two of the three major International B-Boy Championships, Morning of Owl arguably became the best bboy crew in the world and were ranked #1 by Bboyrankingz.com.

In 2018, Morning of Owl appeared and competed on the second season of World of Dance. They were eliminated in the Duels, losing to Ashley & Zack.

== Name ==
In a 2012 interview with allthatbreak, Seung-Ju Lee, the crew manager of Morning of Owl, explained the meaning behind the group's name:

"Our team name is "Morning of Owl." The meaning behind it is that owls stay up at night and therefore have the tranquility and the ability to see things that the public don't get to see. We wanted to get the kind of inspiration that other people can't see and deliver that inspiration on stage when the morning comes around."

— Seung-Ju Lee

== Members ==
The following are listed alphabetically

=== Current ===
- Sez (Inactive; manager) (Note: Seung-Ju Lee no longer performs with Morning of Owl on scene. However, he decided to become the manager of the crew and help with choreography and behind-the-scene activities.)

=== Former ===
- Birdie
- Chibi
- Cho
- Code
- Gon
- Issue
- Kick-ass
- M.K.
- Owl'd
- Pocket
- Rocket
- Sknuf
- Newday
- Zebra
- Jones
