= Last For One =

Korean dance crew

Last For One is a b-boy crew that formed in 1997. With their win in the 2005 Battle of the Year (BOTY), they have been recognized worldwide and as a contributor to the Korean Wave. Their fans call them the "Dancing Taeguk Warriors". They were heavily featured in the film Planet B-Boy, which documents the 2005 BOTY. While most of the members were poor and some lived in extreme poverty in the southern part of South Korea, they had traveled to the capital of Seoul to compete in the BOTY. B-boy Joe currently heads the main wing while B-boy Lee (Jusung) and B-girl Zinny (Zaina Freeman) are regional members and compete in U.S. or international based events.

== Members ==
- B-boy Beat Joe (Cho Sung Gook, born 1983)
- B-boy Taiyou (Suh Ju Hyun, born 1983)
- B-boy Style-m (Lee Yong Joo, born 1983)
- B-boy Fresh (Park Kyung Hoon, born 1983)
- B-boy Min (Jun Hyo Min, born 1985)
- B-boy Stone (Choi Min Suk, born 1984)
- B-boy Baebaeng (Bae Byung Yup, born 1985)
- B-boy Zero-Nine (Shin Young Suk, born 1985)
- B-boy Finger (Yoo Dae Hyuk, born 1986)
- B-boy Ssack (Kim Jin Ook)
- Popping Woogu (Lee Woo Jin, born 1983)

=== New generation ===
- B-boy T.K.O (also R&F member)
- B-boy Style Top (also Sof Thumbz)
- B-boy Super B (also Soul Hunters)
- B-boy Ghost (also Funky Steam)
- B-boy Sleepwalker (also Soul Hunters)
- B-boy Lee (also Last For One USA and Giga Drill)
- B-boy Leety (also R&F)
- B-girl Zinny (also Krazy Bratz)
- B-boy T (also Ground Scratch)
- B-boy Ssin (also Feel the force)
- B-boy Lip
- B-boy Gaspar
- B-boy Super B

== History and awards ==
- 1998 – Seoul Maroni Performance Battle Competition 1st place
- 1998 – National Dance Competition 2nd place
- 1999 – Junju Dance Competition 1st place (Three consecutive wins from 1999–2001)
- 2000 – Junju Battle Competition 1st place
- 2001 – Seoul Hip Hop Festival 1st place
- 2001 – jTV Dance Dance Program 3 wins
- 2001 – Snickers TV ad
- 2001 – Junju Street Dance Party 2:2 1st place
- 2002 – Junju Dance Festival Grand Award
- 2002 – Chungju 3:3 B-boy Battle 1st place
- 2002 – Chunnam Dance Battle 1st place
- 2002 – Seoul Streetmaster Championship – Performance 1st place, Battle 2nd place
- 2002 – Seoul Underground B-boy Master 1st place
- 2002 – Chunnam Dance Festival 1st place
- 2003 – Seoul Street Jam Vol. 2 Top of the Top 1st place
- 2003 – Seoul B-boy Unit Vol. 5 3rd place
- 2003 – Daejun 2:2 B-boy Dance Battle 1st place
- 2003 – Nambu representative of Seoul High Festival
- 2003 – Seoul Infinity Battle Master Competition 1st place
- 2003 – Chunnam Kwangju 3:3 B-boy Battle Competition 1st place
- 2003 – Seoul Battle of the Year Korea 03 Semifinals
- 2003 – Seoul Levi's Battle Master 1st place
- 2003 – Osaka, Japan Battle of Hirapa 1st place
- 2004 – Levi's endorsement performance
- 2004 – Seoul B-boy Party 2:2 Battle Semifinals
- 2004 – Seoul B-boy Challenge Vol. 4 Semifinals
- 2004 – Fukuoka, Japan B-boy Break Title Solo Battle Vol. 6 1st place
- 2004 – Seoul's 2nd Levi's B-boy Master 1st place
- 2004 – MTV TV endorsement
- 2004 – Chinese College Hip Hop Competition Judge
- 2005 – Seoul Match One's Skill 1:1 Battle Showcase
- 2005 – Spain 3:3 B-boy Battle Competition Judge
- 2005 – "Spain Underground Republic 3" Europe B-boy Battle 3:3 1st place
- 2005 – Battle of the Year Korea 1st place
- 2005 – Battle of the Year Win
- 2005 – Chocoba TV ad
- 2005 – e. Comfortable Life TV ad
- 2006 – Battle of the Year 2nd place

== See also ==
- List of dancers
