= R-16 Korea =

R16 Korea
- R16 Korea logo.
- Awarded for: B-boy tournament + Hip-hop and Street Art festival
- Country: South Korea
- Presented by: Cartel Creative, Korea Tourism Organization, Ministry of Culture, Sports and Tourism
- First award: May 31, 2007
- Website: http://www.r16korea.com/en/

R16 Korea is an annual international b-boy tournament and urban arts cultural festival sponsored primarily by the Korea Tourism Organization and the South Korean Ministry of Culture, Sports and Tourism. The main event features sixteen B-Boy crews representing fifteen countries competing in a two-day tournament for world championship titles in two categories: best crew performance and best crew battle.

The festival features graffiti artists, street wear designers, musical performers and dancers who specialize in hip-hop, popping, locking and other urban arts subcultures from South Korea and other countries.

== History ==
Created and Organized by Korea Tourism Organization produced by Cartel Creative Inc., R16 is a celebration of the creative energy behind urban youth culture. Based on a theme of "Respect" (which is what the "R" in R16 refers to), the tournament and festivals were first held in 2007 in the city of Seoul.

The 2008 event took place in the city of Suwon The 2009 event host is the Metropolitan City of Incheon and the 2010 event was brought back to Seoul City. The event will continue annually, as the Hip Hop culture has recognized South Korean b-boys as a special part of its history. Korean-American b-boy, singer, and rapper, Jay Park, has been the official ambassador of R16 from 2011 until 2013. Since 2014, R-16 Korea partnered up with the World BBoy Series and helped create Undisputed, an event to crown the solo world b-boy champion.

In 2016, the funding from the Korean government was cancelled and the competition was not held in 2017 and 2018. In 2019 edition, Korean-sport brand FILA bought the naming rights for the competition, and the competition has therefore been named the 2019 FILA Respect Culture for sponsorship reasons.

== Winners ==
Year	Location	1st place	2nd place	Best Showcase	Solo Winner
2019	Taipei, Taiwan	Mortal Combat	Manila Soul	not held	Shade
2018	Competition was not held				
2017	Competition was not held				
2016	Taipei, Taiwan	Dream Runnerz	Boyz in the Hood	not held	Issei
2015	Seoul, South Korea	Russia	USA	Korea	Menno
2014	Seoul, South Korea	Gamblerz	Predatorz	Predatorz	Issei
2013	Seoul, South Korea	Morning of Owl	Body Carnival	Body Carnival	Issei
2012	Seoul, South Korea	Massive Monkees	Simple System	Jinjo Crew	Issei
2011	Seoul, South Korea	Jinjo Crew	Vagabonds	Jinjo Crew	Taisuke
2010	Seoul, South Korea	Jinjo Crew	Phase-T	Jinjo Crew	Niek
2009	Incheon, South Korea	All Area Crew	Top 9 Crew	All Area Crew	Roxrite
2008	Suwon, South Korea	Gamblerz	Top 9 Crew	Top 9 Crew	
2007	Seoul, South Korea	Rivers Crew	Flow Mo Crew	Mortal Combat	
