= Gamblerz =

South Korean b-boy group

Gamblerz (Korean: 갬블러 크루), formerly known as Gambler, is a South Korean b-boy crew formed in 2002. They are best known for winning first place at Battle of the Year 2004 and 2009, the R-16 Korea Sparkling in 2008 and 2014, CYON Bboy Championships 2010, and Bucheon Bboy International Championship in 2016 along with many other major competitions across the world. Many of their b-boys have competed in individual tournaments as well, such as Red Bull BC One.

The original members of Gamblerz, known in 2002 simply as Gambler, were B-boy Darkness, Music, Bruce Lee, Still, and Sebin. B-boy So (King So) and The End (KYS) were regional members.

According to former crew leader B-boy Darkness, when B-boy Music, the founding member of Gamblerz, left the crew on a hiatus, Darkness changed the crew name from Gambler to Gamblerz. However, after B-boy Music, along with B-boy Sebin and B-boy Laser, returned from the hiatus, Darkness, Music, Laser, and Sebin left Gamblerz to form a separate crew under the original crew name of Gambler. The present day Gamblerz is now led by B-boy Sick. In 2016, the crew ran tests to have a new member and for the first time in Korea, a foreigner was accepted. The Brazilian Victor Carvalho, now better known as Victorious.

== Members ==
Member:	Date of birth:	Also Known As:
Park Ji-Hoon	06.05.1984	Still
Lee Jun-Hak	22.03.1984	Soul Soy
Shin Kyu-Sang	15.01.1985	Bruce Lee
So Jae-Hwan	25.10.1983	King So / So
Kim Yeon-Soo	02.01.1987	The End / KYS
Chung Hyun-Sik	27.02.1981	Sick
Hong Sung-Sik	07.05.1984	Noodle
Hong Sung-Jin	19.02.1986	Pop
Park Sun-Hak	08.01.1984	Ssun
Cho Jae-Yung	22.05.1986	Blast
Lim Suk-Yong	15.03.1988	Zesty
Back Seung-Wan	08.06.1988	Furious
Cho Dong-Wook	25.05.1988	Rush
Jang Soo-Yong	02.09.1984	Hound
Kim Ki-Su	23.02.1987	Rocket
Park In-Soo	11.11.1992	Kill
Seo Hey-Mi	07.06.1985	Juice Baby
Kim Eung-Hyuk	07.02.1997	Leap
Nahyo M-Kam	12.04.1993	Slice
Kyeong Nyun	12.24.1993	Bean
Sakeong Hyun	09.02.1994	Irak
Yeri Kim	03.23.2000	Yell
