= Red Bull BC One India Cypher =

BBoy world championship

The Red Bull BC One India Cypher is the India chapter of the Red Bull BC One annual international breakdancing (B-Boy) competition sponsored by Red Bull. The Cypher serves as a national qualifier for the Red Bull BC One Asia Pacific Finals and the World Final.

B-Boy Flying Machine won the inaugural edition of the Red Bull BC One India Cypher in 2015. Flying Machine has since won the competition five times, the most of any B-Boy.

== Winners ==
=== B-Boy ===
Year	Name	Crew	Runner-up	Crew
2024	Flying Machine	BeastMode Crew	Benman	
2023	Ginni	Smokin Skillz Crew	Flexagon	Flying Machine Crew
2022	Flying Machine	BeastMode Crew	Antique	Raw Breakers Crew
2021	Wildchild	BeastMode Crew	Flying Machine	BeastMode Crew
2019	Tornado	Flying Machine Crew	Wildchild	BeastMode Crew
2018	Flying Machine	BeastMode Crew	Wildchild	BeastMode Crew
2017	Flying Machine	BeastMode Crew	Shawn	Black Ice Crew
2016	Abdul	Roc Fresh Crew	Nevermind	The Highest Examples
2015	Flying Machine	BeastMode Crew	Nevermind	The Highest Examples

==== B-Girl ====
Year	Name	Crew	Runner-up	Crew
2024	Glib	The Caper Beats Crew	Bar-B	3-D Crew
2023	Glib	The Caper Beats Crew	Bar-B	3-D Crew
2022	Bar-B	3-D Crew	Glib	The Caper Beats Crew
2021	Jo	Black Ice Crew	Pace	
2019	Jo	Black Ice Crew	Flowraw	Smokin Skillz Crew

== 2015 ==
=== RBBC1 India Cypher 2015 Results ===
Following an intensive round of qualifiers, 16 of the country's best B-Boys battled it out at the Red Bull BC One India Cypher for the chance to represent India at the Red Bull BC One Asia Pacific Finals in Seoul, South Korea on 17 October. The Red Bull BC One World Final held in Rome, Italy on 14 November 2015.
Date: June 13, 2015
Location: Mumbai, India

DJ: DJ Light
Judges: Hong 10, Taisuke, RoxRite

Round of 16
(India) Unwind	L
(India) AK	W
(India) Funky Monkey	W
(India) Rocone	L
(India) Gani	L
(India) Shawn	W
(India) Flexx	L
(India) Flying Machine	W
(India) Mugen	L
(India) Wildchild	W
(India) Godhand	L
(India) Beat	W
(India) Sagar	L
(India) Nevermind	W
(India) Rawdr	L
(India) Likith	W

Quarterfinals
(India) Funky Monkey	W
(India) AK	L
(India) Shawn	L
(India) Flying Machine	W
(India) Beat	L
(India) Wildchild	W
(India) Likith	L
(India) Nevermind	W

Semifinals
(India) Flying Machine	W
(India) Funky Monkey	L
(India) Nevermind	W
(India) Wildchild	L

Finals
(India) Flying Machine	W
(India) NeverMind	L
