= Red Bull BC One Asia Pacific Finals =

This page provides the summary of RBBC1 Asia Pacific Qualifier/Finals.

Since 2012, Red Bull BC One has held a qualifier for the World Final in the Asia Pacific Region. The winner advances to the Red Bull BC One World Final.

== Winners ==
Year	Location	Winner	Crew	Runner-up	Crew
2015	Seoul, South Korea	(South Korea) Leon	Fusion MC	(Japan) Issei	Foundnation
2014	Taipei, Taiwan	(Australia) Blond	SKB	(Japan) Taisuke	Flooriorz
2013	Fukuoka, Japan	(Japan) Nori	Flooriorz	(South Korea) Vero	Jinjo
2012	Auckland, New Zealand	(South Korea) Shorty Force	One Way Crew/Korean Assassins	(South Korea) Differ	T.I.P.
2011	Taipei, Taiwan	(Japan) Taisuke	Flooriorz	(South Korea) Blue	Extreme

== 2015 ==
=== RBBC1 Asia Pacific 2015 results ===
Location: Seoul, South Korea

Round of 16
(China) Keven	L
(Japan) Issei	W
(Singapore) Sean	W
(Taiwan) Saru	L
(Malaysia) Lego Sam	L
(Australia) Blond	W
(India) Flying Machine	L
(South Korea) Octopus	W
(New Zealand) Akorn	L
(Japan) Just Fit	W
(Philippines) Haslah	L
(South Korea) Leon	W
(Hong Kong) Drunk	L
(Japan) Nori	W
(Taiwan) Gred	L
(South Korea) Vero	W

Quarterfinals
(Japan) Issei	W
(Singapore) Sean	L
(Australia) Blond	L
(South Korea) Octopus	W
(Japan) Just Fit	L
(South Korea) Leon	W
(Japan) Nori	L
(South Korea) Vero	W

Semifinals
(Japan) Issei	W
(South Korea) Octopus	L
(South Korea) Leon	W
(South Korea) Vero	L

Finals
(South Korea) Leon	W
(Japan) Issei	L

== 2014 ==
=== RBBC1 Asia Pacific 2014 results ===
Location: Taipei, Taiwan

Round of 16
(South Korea) Zooty	L
(China) Lil Chao	W
(Laos) C-Lil	W
(China) Astro	L
(South Korea) Skim	W'
(Taiwan) Boris	L
(Japan) Taisuke	W
(New Zealand) Akorn	L
(South Korea) Octopus	W
(Taiwan) Sin	L
(Japan) Nori	W
(Taiwan) Chen Chen	L
(Australia) Blond	W
(Singapore) Sean	L
(Japan) Just Fit	W
(Malaysia) Khenobu	L

Quarter-finals
(China) Lil Chao	W
(Laos) C-Lil	L
(South Korea) Skim	L
(Japan) Taisuke	W
(South Korea) Octopus	L
(Japan) Nori	W
(Australia) Blond	W
(Japan) Just Fit	L

Semi-finals
(China) Lil Chao	L
(Japan) Taisuke	W
(Japan) Nori	L
(Australia) Blond	W

Final
(Australia) Blond	W
(Japan) Taisuke	L
Third place

== 2013 ==
=== 2013 Main Event Competitor List ===
Name	Crew	Qualification
(Malaysia) Khenobu	Giller Battle	Winner of RBBC1 Malaysia Cypher 2013
(Japan) Nori	Flooriorz	Winner of RBBC1 Japan Cypher 2013
(China) Drunk	M.I.N.D Studio	Winner of RBBC1 Hong Kong Cypher 2013
(Taiwan) Free Nai	Top Coalition	Winner of RBBC1 Taiwan Cypher 2013
(South Korea) Shorty Force	One Way Crew, Korean Assassins	Winner of RBBC1 Busan Cypher 2013
(Singapore) Leonard	Underone	Winner of RBBC1 Singapore Cypher 2013
(South Korea) Vero	Jinjo	Winner of RBBC1 Seoul Cypher 2013
(New Zealand) Akorn	Common Ground	Winner of RBBC1 New Zealand Cypher 2013
(South Korea) Kill	Gamblerz Crew/C.A.Y. Crew	Runner-up of RBBC1 Busan Cypher 2013
(Japan) Issei	Foundnation	Runner-up of RBBC1 Japan Cypher 2013
(Taiwan) Chuan	Revolution Crew	Runner-up of RBBC1 Taiwan Cypher 2013
(Philippines) Allen Anas	Breakism	Winner of The Grind 1 on 1 Breakin Battle 2013
(Australia) Sette	Wicked Force/ Delinkwentz	Wildcard Selection
(Thailand) Cheno	99 Flava, Ground Scatter Breaker	Wildcard Selection
(Japan) Taisuke	Flooriorz	Wildcard Selection
(Vietnam) Slowz	S.I.N.E	Wildcard Selection

=== RBBC1 Asia Pacific 2013 results ===
Location: Fukuoka, Japan

Round of 16
(Philippines) Allen Anas	L
(South Korea) Kill	W
(Malaysia) Khenobu	L
(Japan) Nori	W
(China) Drunk	L
(Taiwan) Free Nai	W
(Japan) Taisuke	W
(Singapore) Leonard	L
(South Korea) Vero	W
(Australia) Sette	L
(Japan) Issei	W
(Taiwan) Chuan	L
(New Zealand) Akorn	L
(Thailand) Cheno	W
(Vietnam) Slowz	L
(South Korea) Shorty Force	W

Quarter-finals
(South Korea) Kill	L
(Japan) Nori	W
(Taiwan) Free Nai	L
(Japan) Taisuke	W
(South Korea) Vero	W
(Japan) Issei	L
(Thailand) Cheno	L
(South Korea) Shorty Force	W

Semi-finals
(Japan) Nori	W
(Japan) Taisuke	L
(South Korea) Vero	W
(South Korea) Shorty Force	L

Final
(Japan) Nori	W
(South Korea) Vero	L
Third place

== 2012 ==
=== RBBC1 Asia Pacific 2012 results ===
Location: Auckland, New Zealand

Round of 16
(Malaysia) Juicy	L
(Japan) Babylon	W
(New Zealand) Grub D	L
(Taiwan) Dragon Lee	W
(Laos) C-Lil	L
(South Korea) Shorty Force	W
(Indonesia) Wildson	L
(Japan) Tomokazu	W
(Vietnam) 3T	L
(Australia) Monsta	W
(China) Monkey J	L
(South Korea) Fe	W
(Singapore) Gerald	L
(Taiwan) Taower	W
(New Zealand) Akorn	L
(South Korea) Differ	W

Quarter-finals
(Japan) Babylon	W
(Taiwan) Dragon Lee	L
(South Korea) Shorty Force	W
(Japan) Tomokazu	L
(Australia) Monsta	L
(South Korea) Fe	W
(Taiwan) Taower	L
(South Korea) Differ	W

Semi-finals
(Japan) Babylon	L
(South Korea) Shorty Force	W
(South Korea) Fe	L
(South Korea) Differ	W

Final
(South Korea) Shorty Force	W
(South Korea) Differ	L
Third place

== 2011 ==
=== RBBC1 Asia Pacific 2011 results ===
Location: Tapei, Taiwan

Round of 16
(South Korea) Nauty One	W
(Malaysia) Zen	L
(Taiwan) Lil Dragon	W
(Thailand) Pri One	L
(South Korea) Blue	W'
(Taiwan) Hertz	L
(Japan) Yooshi	W
(Australia) Edit	L
(China) Monkey J	L
(Japan) Taisuke	W
(Japan) Nori	W
(Laos) C-Lil	L
(South Korea) Vero	W
(Taiwan) Lil Han	L
(Vietnam) 3T	W
(New Zealand) Grub D	L

Quarter-finals
(South Korea) Nauty One	W
(Taiwan) Lil Dragon	L
(South Korea) Blue	W
(Japan) Yooshi	L
(Japan) Taisuke	W
(Japan) Nori	L
(Vietnam) 3T	L
(South Korea) Vero	W

Semi-finals
(South Korea) Nauty One	L
(South Korea) Blue	W
(Japan) Taisuke	W
(South Korea) Vero	L

Final
(Japan) Taisuke	W
(South Korea) Blue	L
Third place

== Most Individual Battle Wins ==
Bboy	Wins	Titles	Appearances
(Japan) Taisuke	9	1	3
(Japan) Nori	8	1	4
(South Korea) Vero	8	0	3
(South Korea) Shorty Force	6	1	2
(Australia) Blond	5	1	2
(South Korea) Leon	4	1	1
(Japan) Issei	4	0	2
(South Korea) Differ	3	0	1

== Previous Participants by Country ==
Bboy in Bold denotes former Red Bull BC One Asia Pacific Winner.

Australia

- (Australia) **Blond** (2014-2015)
- (Australia) Edit (2011)
- (Australia) Monsta (2012)
- (Australia) Sette (2013)

China

- (China) Drunk (2013, 2015)
- (China) Kevin (2015)
- (China) Lil Chao (2014)
- (China) Monkey J (2011-2012)

India

- (India) Flying Machine (2015)

Indonesia

- (Indonesia) Wildson (2012)

Japan

- (Japan) Babylon (2012)
- (Japan) Issei (2013, 2015)
- (Japan) Just Fit (2014-2015)
- (Japan) **Nori** (2011, 2013–2015)
- (Japan) **Taisuke** (2011, 2013–2014)
- (Japan) Tomokazu (2012)
- (Japan) Yooshi (2011)

Korea

- (South Korea) Blue (2011)
- (South Korea) Differ (2012)
- (South Korea) Fe (2012)
- (South Korea) Kill (2013)
- (South Korea) **Leon** (2015)
- (South Korea) Nauty One (2011)
- (South Korea) Octopus (2014-2015)
- (South Korea) **Shorty Force** (2012-2013)
- (South Korea) Skim (2014)
- (South Korea) Vero (2011, 2013, 2015)
- (South Korea) Zooty (2014)

Laos

- (Laos) C-Lil (2011-2012,2014)

Malaysia

- (Malaysia) Khenobu (2013-2014)
- (Malaysia) Juicy (2012)
- (Malaysia) Lego Sam (2015)
- (Malaysia) Zen (2011)

New Zealand

- (New Zealand) Akorn (2012-2015)
- (New Zealand) Grub D (2011-2012)

Philippines

- (Philippines) Allen Anas (2013)
- (Philippines) Haslah (2015)

Singapore

- (Singapore) Gerard (2012)
- (Singapore) Lenard (2013)
- (Singapore) Sean (2014-2015)

Taiwan

- (Taiwan) Boris (2014)
- (Taiwan) Chen Chen (2014)
- (Taiwan) Chuan (2013)
- (Taiwan) Dragon Lee (2012)
- (Taiwan) Free Nai (2013)
- (Taiwan) Gred (2015)
- (Taiwan) Hertz (2011)
- (Taiwan) Lil Dragon (2011)
- (Taiwan) Lil Han (2011)
- (Taiwan) Taower (2012)
- (Taiwan) Saru (2015)
- (Taiwan) Sin (2014)

Thailand

- (Thailand) Cheno (2013)
- (Thailand) Pri One (2011)

Vietnam

- (Vietnam) Slowz (2013)
- (Vietnam) 3T (2011, 2012)
