= Red Bull BC One North American Finals =

This page provides the summary of RBBC1 North America Qualifier/Finals.

Since 2012, Red Bull BC One has held a qualifier for the World Final in the North America Region. The winner advances to the Red Bull BC One World Final.

== Winners ==
Year	Location	Winner	Crew	Runner-up	Crew
2015	Orlando, United States	(United States) Victor	MF Kidz/Squadron	(United States) Ben	Knuckleheadzoo
2014	Las Vegas, United States	(United States) Victor	MF Kidz/Squadron	(United States) Gravity	5 Crew Dynasty
2013	Houston, United States	(United States) Gravity	5 Crew Dynasty	(United States) Ben	Knuckleheadzoo
2012	Chicago, United States	(United States) DOMkey	Lionz of Zion	(United States) ViLLN	Underground Flow
2011	Chicago, United States	(United States) El Niño	Floor Lords	(United States) Victor	MF Kidz

== 2015 ==
=== RBBC1 North American 2015 results ===
Location: Orlando, United States

Round of 16
(United States) Zeku	L
(United States) Moy	W
(United States) Rion	W
(United States) Icey Ives	L
(United States) Napalm	W
(United States) Kid Cruz	L
(United States) Victor	W
(United States) DQ	L
(United States) Keebz	W
(United States) Joshskittle	L
(United States) Starvin' Sa-Ewl	W
(United States) Mighty Wealthy	L
(United States) Insight	L
(United States) Frankie	W
(United States) Ben	W
(Canada) Illz	L

Quarter-finals
(United States) Moy	W
(United States) Rion	L
(United States) Napalm	L
(United States) Victor	W
(United States) Keebz	L
(United States) Starvin' Sa-Ewl	W
(United States) Frankie	L
(United States) Ben	W

Semi-finals
(United States) Moy	L
(United States) Victor	W
(United States) Starvin' Sa-Ewl	L
(United States) Ben	W

Final
(United States) Victor	W
(United States) Ben	L
Third place

== 2014 ==
=== RBBC1 North American 2014 results ===
Location: Las Vegas, United States

Round of 16
(United States) Victor	3
(United States) Jayd illa	0
(United States) MN Joe	1
(United States) Tung Fu	2
(United States) Morris	2
(United States) Rion	1
(United States) Tata	2*
(Canada) Vicious	0*
(United States) Toyz aRe Us	3
(United States) Tony Tbags	0
(United States) Gravity	3
(United States) Maynard	0
(United States) Isaiah	2
(United States) El Niño	1
(Canada) Fleau	3
(United States) Icey Ives	0

Quarter-finals
(United States) Victor	2
(United States) Tung Fu	1
(United States) Morris	2
(United States) Tata	1
(United States) Toyz aRe Us	1
(United States) Gravity	2
(United States) Isaiah	0
(Canada) Fleau	3

Semi-finals
(United States) Victor	3
(United States) Morris	0
(United States) Gravity	2
(Canada) Fleau	1

Final
(United States) Victor	2
(United States) Gravity	1
Third place

== 2013 ==
=== RBBC1 North American 2013 results ===
Location: Houston, United States

Round of 16
(United States) Gravity	W
(United States) Lancer	L
(United States) VicNice	L
(United States) Jeremy	W
(United States) Lil Rock	1
(United States) Knuckles	2
(United States) Flexum	W
(United States) Keebz	L
(United States) NastyRay	L
(United States) Ben	W
(United States) Saewl	W
(Canada) Vicious	L
(United States) Kareem	W
(United States) Whorak	L
(United States) Dang	L
(United States) Mijo	W

Quarter-finals
(United States) Gravity	3
(United States) Jeremy	0
(United States) Knuckles	0
(United States) Flexum	3
(United States) Ben	2
(United States) Saewl	1
(United States) Kareem	2
(United States) Mijo	1

Semi-finals
(United States) Gravity	3
(United States) Flexum	0
(United States) Ben	2
(United States) Kareem	1

Final
(United States) Gravity	3
(United States) Ben	0
Third place

== 2012 ==
=== RBBC1 North American 2012 results ===
Location: Chicago, United States

Round of 16
(United States) Bebo	2
(United States) Omen	1
(United States) Ruen	1
(United States) MN Joe	2
(Canada) Fleau	0
(United States) Prada G	3
(United States) DOMkey	3
(United States) Tata	0
(United States) Nasty Nate	0
(United States) MIG187	3
(United States) Stripes	2*
(United States) Kid Cruz	0*
(United States) Ken Fury	1
(United States) ViLLN	2
(United States) Evol	2
(United States) Mijo	1

Quarter-finals
(United States) Bebo	2
(United States) MN Joe	1
(United States) Prada G	0
(United States) DOMkey	3
(United States) MIG187	0
(United States) Stripes	3
(United States) ViLLN	2
(United States) Evol	1

Semi-finals
(United States) Bebo	1
(United States) DOMkey	2
(United States) Stripes	0
(United States) ViLLN	3

Final
(United States) DOMkey	3
(United States) ViLLN	0
Third place

== 2011 ==
=== RBBC1 USA Qualifier 2011 results ===
note: Prior to 2012, Red Bull BC One held a USA qualifier specifically for boys from America.

Location: Chicago, United States

Round of 16
(United States) El Niño	5
(United States) Kid Glyde	0
(United States) Evol	1*
(United States) ATN	3*
(United States) Mijo	1*
(United States) Nasty Ray	3*
(United States) Toyz aRe Us	5
(United States) Palmer	0
(United States) Gravity	2
(United States) Vicious Victor	3
(United States) Keebz	4
(Canada) Puzzles	1
(United States) Kareem	4*
(United States) Morris	0*
(United States) Frankie	0
(United States) Minnesota Joe	5

Quarter-finals
(United States) El Niño	5
(United States) ATN	0
(United States) Nasty Ray	1*
(United States) Toyz aRe Us	3*
(United States) Vicious Victor	3
(United States) Keebz	2
(United States) Kareem	3*
(United States) Minnesota Joe	1*

Semi-finals
(United States) El Niño	3*
(United States) Toyz aRe Us	1*
(United States) Vicious Victor	3
(United States) Kareem	2

Final
(United States) El Niño	5
(United States) Vicious Victor	0
Third place
