= Red Bull BC One USA Qualifier =

This page provides the summary of RBBC1 USA Qualifier.

In 2007 and 2011, Red Bull BC One held a qualifier for the World Final in USA. The winner advances to the Red Bull BC One World Final.

== Winners ==
Year	Location	Winner	Crew
2011	Chicago, United States	(United States) El Niño	Floorlords/Flava Squad/Squadron
2007	Hollywood, United States	(United States) Spee-D	Unique Styles

Starting in 2012, Red Bull BC One USA Qualifier was replaced by RBBC1 North American Finals to include boys from Canada as well.

== 2011 ==
=== RBBC1 USA Qualifier 2011 results ===
Location: Chicago, United States

Round of 16
(United States) El Niño	W
(United States) Kid Glyde	L
(United States) Evol	L
(United States) ATN	W
(United States) Mijo	L
(United States) Nasty Ray	W
(United States) Toyz aRe Us	W
(United States) Palmer	L
(United States) Gravity	L
(United States) Vicious Victor	W
(United States) Keebz	W
(United States) Puzzles	L
(United States) Kareem	W
(United States) Morris	L
(United States) Frankie	L
(United States) Minnesota Joe	W

Quarter-finals
(United States) El Niño	W
(United States) ATN	L
(United States) Nasty Ray	L
(United States) Toyz aRe Us	W
(United States) Vicious Victor	W
(United States) Keebz	L
(United States) Kareem	W
(United States) Minnesota Joe	L

Semi-finals
(United States) El Niño	W
(United States) Toyz aRe Us	L
(United States) Vicious Victor	W
(United States) Kareem	L

Final
(United States) El Niño	W
(United States) Vicious Victor	L
Third place
